= Freestyle skiing at the 2022 Winter Olympics – Men's ski cross =

Men's ski cross at the XXIV Olympic Winter Games
- Freestyle skiing
- Venue: Genting Snow Park, Zhangjiakou
- Date: 18 February 2022
- Competitors: 32 from 11 nations

Medalists
| 1st place, gold medalist(s) | | Ryan Regez | Switzerland |
| 2nd place, silver medalist(s) | | Alex Fiva | Switzerland |
| 3rd place, bronze medalist(s) | | Sergey Ridzik | ROC |

The men's ski cross competition in freestyle skiing at the 2022 Winter Olympics was held on 18 February, at the Genting Snow Park in Zhangjiakou. Ryan Regez of Switzerland won the event, and his compatriot Alex Fiva won the silver medal, the first Olympic medals for both of them. Sergey Ridzik, representing the Russian Olympic Committee, won the bronze medal, replicating his 2018 success.

The defending champion was Brady Leman. The silver medalist Marc Bischofberger did not qualify. At the 2021–22 FIS Freestyle Ski World Cup, before the Olympics, Regez and Terence Tchiknavorian jointly led the ranking, with Bastien Midol third. Fiva was the 2021 world champion.

== Qualification ==
A total of 32 ski cross athletes qualified to compete at the games. For an athlete to compete they must have a minimum of 80.00 FIS points on the FIS Points List on January 17, 2022 and a top 30 finish in a World Cup event or at the FIS Freestyle Ski World Championships 2021. A country could enter a maximum of four athletes into the event.

== Results ==
=== Seeding run ===
| Rank | Bib | Name | Country | Time | Difference |
|---|---|---|---|---|---|
| 1 | 4 | Alex Fiva | Switzerland | 1:11.94 | — |
| 2 | 29 | Igor Omelin | ROC | 1:12.28 | +0.34 |
| 3 | 24 | Ryo Sugai | Japan | 1:12.29 | +0.35 |
| 4 | 14 | Brady Leman | Canada | 1:12.30 | +0.36 |
| 5 | 1 | Reece Howden | Canada | 1:12.37 | +0.43 |
| 6 | 25 | Jared Schmidt | Canada | 1:12.39 | +0.45 |
| 7 | 13 | Ryan Regez | Switzerland | 1:12.44 | +0.50 |
| 8 | 10 | Simone Deromedis | Italy | 1:12.48 | +0.54 |
| 9 | 6 | Bastien Midol | France | 1:12.55 | +0.61 |
| 10 | 3 | Johannes Rohrweck | Austria | 1:12.71 | +0.77 |
| 11 | 9 | François Place | France | 1:12.83 | +0.89 |
| 12 | 5 | Terence Tchiknavorian | France | 1:12.85 | +0.91 |
| 13 | 2 | David Mobärg | Sweden | 1:12.97 | +1.03 |
| 14 | 15 | Erik Mobärg | Sweden | 1:13.01 | +1.07 |
| 15 | 8 | Kevin Drury | Canada | 1:13.11 | +1.17 |
| 16 | 18 | Jean-Frédéric Chapuis | France | 1:13.20 | +1.26 |
| 17 | 17 | Daniel Bohnacker | Germany | 1:13.21 | +1.27 |
| 18 | 7 | Florian Wilmsmann | Germany | 1:13.22 | +1.28 |
| 19 | 12 | Tristan Takats | Austria | 1:13.29 | +1.35 |
| 20 | 32 | Kirill Sysoev | ROC | 1:13.36 | +1.42 |
| 21 | 16 | Joos Berry | Switzerland | 1:13.43 | +1.49 |
| 22 | 31 | Satoshi Furuno | Japan | 1:13.46 | +1.52 |
| 23 | 11 | Viktor Andersson | Sweden | 1:13.49 | +1.55 |
| 24 | 27 | Tyler Wallasch | United States | 1:13.55 | +1.61 |
| 25 | 26 | Adam Kappacher | Austria | 1:13.58 | +1.64 |
| 26 | 19 | Tobias Müller | Germany | 1:13.64 | +1.70 |
| 27 | 20 | Romain Detraz | Switzerland | 1:13.69 | +1.75 |
| 28 | 30 | Elliott Baralo | Sweden | 1:13.82 | +1.88 |
| 29 | 21 | Sergey Ridzik | ROC | 1:13.95 | +2.01 |
| 30 | 23 | Robert Winkler | Austria | 1:14.05 | +2.11 |
| 31 | 28 | Oliver Davies | Great Britain | 1:14.84 | +2.90 |
| 32 | 22 | Niklas Bachsleitner | Germany | 1:17.53 | +5.59 |

=== Elimination round ===
==== 1/8 finals ====
Heat 1

| Rank | Bib | Name | Country | Notes |
|---|---|---|---|---|
| 1 | 1 | Alex Fiva | Switzerland | Q |
| 2 | 17 | Daniel Bohnacker | Germany | Q |
| 3 | 16 | Jean-Frédéric Chapuis | France | |
| 4 | 32 | Niklas Bachsleitner | Germany | |

Heat 2

| Rank | Bib | Name | Country | Notes |
|---|---|---|---|---|
| 1 | 8 | Simone Deromedis | Italy | Q |
| 2 | 9 | Bastien Midol | France | Q |
| 3 | 25 | Adam Kappacher | Austria | |
| 4 | 24 | Tyler Wallasch | United States | |

Heat 3

| Rank | Bib | Name | Country | Notes |
|---|---|---|---|---|
| 1 | 5 | Reece Howden | Canada | Q |
| 2 | 21 | Joos Berry | Switzerland | Q |
| 3 | 12 | Terence Tchiknavorian | France | |
| 4 | 28 | Elliott Baralo | Sweden | |

Heat 4

| Rank | Bib | Name | Country | Notes |
|---|---|---|---|---|
| 1 | 29 | Sergey Ridzik | ROC | Q |
| 2 | 4 | Brady Leman | Canada | Q |
| 3 | 13 | David Mobärg | Sweden | |
| 4 | 20 | Kirill Sysoev | ROC | |

Heat 5

| Rank | Bib | Name | Country | Notes |
|---|---|---|---|---|
| 1 | 14 | Erik Mobärg | Sweden | Q |
| 2 | 19 | Tristan Takats | Austria | Q |
| 3 | 3 | Ryo Sugai | Japan | |
| 4 | 30 | Robert Winkler | Austria | |

Heat 6

| Rank | Bib | Name | Country | Notes |
|---|---|---|---|---|
| 1 | 11 | François Place | France | Q |
| 2 | 6 | Jared Schmidt | Canada | Q |
| 3 | 27 | Romain Detraz | Switzerland | |
| 4 | 22 | Satoshi Furuno | Japan | |

Heat 7

| Rank | Bib | Name | Country | Notes |
|---|---|---|---|---|
| 1 | 7 | Ryan Regez | Switzerland | Q |
| 2 | 10 | Johannes Rohrweck | Austria | Q |
| 3 | 26 | Tobias Müller | Germany | |
| 4 | 23 | Viktor Andersson | Sweden | |

Heat 8

| Rank | Bib | Name | Country | Notes |
|---|---|---|---|---|
| 1 | 2 | Igor Omelin | ROC | Q |
| 2 | 15 | Kevin Drury | Canada | Q |
| 3 | 18 | Florian Wilmsmann | Germany | |
| 4 | 31 | Oliver Davies | Great Britain | |

==== Quarterfinals ====
Heat 1

| Rank | Bib | Name | Country | Notes |
|---|---|---|---|---|
| 1 | 1 | Alex Fiva | Switzerland | Q |
| 2 | 8 | Simone Deromedis | Italy | Q |
| 3 | 9 | Bastien Midol | France | |
| 4 | 17 | Daniel Bohnacker | Germany | |

Heat 2

| Rank | Bib | Name | Country | Notes |
|---|---|---|---|---|
| 1 | 29 | Sergey Ridzik | ROC | Q |
| 2 | 4 | Brady Leman | Canada | Q |
| 3 | 5 | Reece Howden | Canada | |
| 4 | 21 | Joos Berry | Switzerland | |

Heat 3

| Rank | Bib | Name | Country | Notes |
|---|---|---|---|---|
| 1 | 14 | Erik Mobärg | Sweden | Q |
| 2 | 11 | François Place | France | Q |
| 3 | 6 | Jared Schmidt | Canada | |
| 4 | 19 | Tristan Takats | Austria | |

Heat 4

| Rank | Bib | Name | Country | Notes |
|---|---|---|---|---|
| 1 | 7 | Ryan Regez | Switzerland | Q |
| 2 | 10 | Johannes Rohrweck | Austria | Q |
| 3 | 15 | Kevin Drury | Canada | |
| 4 | 2 | Igor Omelin | ROC | |

==== Semifinals ====
Heat 1

| Rank | Bib | Name | Country | Notes |
|---|---|---|---|---|
| 1 | 1 | Alex Fiva | Switzerland | BF |
| 2 | 29 | Sergey Ridzik | ROC | BF |
| 3 | 8 | Simone Deromedis | Italy | SF |
| 4 | 4 | Brady Leman | Canada | SF |

Heat 2

| Rank | Bib | Name | Country | Notes |
|---|---|---|---|---|
| 1 | 14 | Erik Mobärg | Sweden | BF |
| 2 | 7 | Ryan Regez | Switzerland | BF |
| 3 | 10 | Johannes Rohrweck | Austria | SF |
| 4 | 11 | François Place | France | SF |

==== Finals ====
Small final

| Rank | Bib | Name | Country | Notes |
|---|---|---|---|---|
| 5 | 8 | Simone Deromedis | Italy | |
| 6 | 4 | Brady Leman | Canada | |
| 7 | 10 | Johannes Rohrweck | Austria | |
| 8 | 11 | François Place | France | |

Big final

| Rank | Bib | Name | Country | Notes |
|---|---|---|---|---|
| 1st place, gold medalist(s) | 7 | Ryan Regez | Switzerland | |
| 2nd place, silver medalist(s) | 1 | Alex Fiva | Switzerland | |
| 3rd place, bronze medalist(s) | 29 | Sergey Ridzik | ROC | |
| 4 | 14 | Erik Mobärg | Sweden | |
