= FIS Freestyle Ski and Snowboarding World Championships 2021 – Men's ski cross =

Men's ski cross at the FIS Freestyle Ski and Snowboarding World Championships 2021
- Location: Idre, Sweden
- Dates: 10 February (qualification); 13 February
- Competitors: 41 from 14 nations

Medalists
gold medal	Alex Fiva	Switzerland
silver medal	François Place	France
bronze medal	Erik Mobärg	Sweden

The Men's ski cross competition at the FIS Freestyle Ski and Snowboarding World Championships 2021 was held on 13 February 2021. A qualification was held 10 February.

== Qualification ==
The qualification was held on 10 February at 12:15.

Rank	Bib	Name	Country	Time	Notes
1	12	François Place	France	1:11.26	Q
2	1	David Mobärg	Sweden	1:11.86	Q
3	7	Jonas Lenherr	Switzerland	1:12.04	Q
4	5	Alex Fiva	Switzerland	1:12.08	Q
5	8	Bastien Midol	France	1:12.29	Q
6	6	Niklas Bachsleitner	Germany	1:12.37	Q
7	14	Jean-Frédéric Chapuis	France	1:12.44	Q
8	9	Reece Howden	Canada	1:12.71	Q
9	11	Florian Wilmsmann	Germany	1:12.78	Q
10	18	Johannes Rohrweck	Austria	1:12.85	Q
11	15	Ryan Regez	Switzerland	1:12.86	Q
12	2	Tyler Wallasch	United States	1:13.00	Q
13	16	Brady Leman	Canada	1:13.13	Q
14	22	Cornel Renn	Germany	1:13.22	Q
15	21	Christopher Delbosco	Canada	1:13.26	Q
16	4	Marc Bischofberger	Switzerland	1:13.27	Q
17	10	Jonathan Midol	France	1:13.41	Q
18	13	Kristofor Mahler	Canada	1:13.41	Q
19	20	Youri Duplessis Kergomard	France	1:13.60	Q
20	19	Johannes Aujesky	Austria	1:13.63	Q
21	17	Robert Winkler	Austria	1:13.75	Q
22	26	Oliver Davies	Great Britain	1:13.78	Q
23	3	Viktor Andersson	Sweden	1:13.79	Q
24	25	Ryo Sugai	Japan	1:13.90	Q
25	24	Sandro Siebenhofer	Austria	1:14.40	Q
26	35	Erik Mobärg	Sweden	1:14.42	Q
27	28	Satoshi Furuno	Japan	1:14.46	Q
28	27	Ferdinand Dorsch	Germany	1:14.57	Q
29	23	Simone Deromedis	Italy	1:14.75	Q
30	29	Sergey Ridzik	Russian Ski Federation	1:14.83	Q
31	40	Fredrik Nilsson	Sweden	1:15.30	Q
32	37	Edoardo Zorzi	Italy	1:15.37	Q
33	39	Dominik Züch	Italy	1:15.48	
34	36	Douglas Crawford	Australia	1:15.95	
35	30	Igor Omelin	Russian Ski Federation	1:16.12	
36	33	Xander Vercammen	Belgium	1:16.64	
37	38	Ryuto Kobayashi	Japan	1:16.95	
38	31	Vladimir Shmyrov	Russian Ski Federation	1:17.40	
39	32	Robbie Morrison	Australia	1:17.41	
40	34	Artem Nabiulin	Russian Ski Federation	1:19.31	
41	41	Koppány Pap	Hungary	1:19.57	

== Elimination round ==
=== 1/8 finals ===
Heat 1

Rank	Bib	Name	Country	Notes
1	17	Jonathan Midol	France	Q
2	1	François Place	France	Q
3	32	Edoardo Zorzi	Italy	
4	16	Marc Bischofberger	Switzerland	

Heat 3

Rank	Bib	Name	Country	Notes
1	5	Bastien Midol	France	Q
2	21	Robert Winkler	Austria	Q
3	12	Tyler Wallasch	United States	
4	28	Ferdinand Dorsch	Germany	

Heat 5

Rank	Bib	Name	Country	Notes
1	3	Jonas Lenherr	Switzerland	Q
2	14	Cornel Renn	Germany	Q
3	19	Youri Duplessis Kergomard	France	
4	30	Sergey Ridzik	Russian Ski Federation	

Heat 7

Rank	Bib	Name	Country	Notes
1	26	Erik Mobärg	Sweden	Q
2	10	Johannes Rohrweck	Austria	Q
3	23	Viktor Andersson	Sweden	
4	7	Jean-Frédéric Chapuis	France	

Heat 2

Rank	Bib	Name	Country	Notes
1	8	Reece Howden	Canada	Q
2	25	Sandro Siebenhofer	Austria	Q
3	9	Florian Wilmsmann	Germany	
4	24	Ryo Sugai	Japan	

Heat 4

Rank	Bib	Name	Country	Notes
1	20	Johannes Aujesky	Austria	Q
2	4	Alex Fiva	Switzerland	Q
3	13	Brady Leman	Canada	
4	29	Simone Deromedis	Italy	

Heat 6

Rank	Bib	Name	Country	Notes
1	22	Oliver Davies	Great Britain	Q
2	6	Niklas Bachsleitner	Germany	Q
3	11	Ryan Regez	Switzerland	
4	27	Satoshi Furuno	Japan	

Heat 8

Rank	Bib	Name	Country	Notes
1	2	David Mobärg	Sweden	Q
2	18	Kristofor Mahler	Canada	Q
3	31	Fredrik Nilsson	Sweden	
4	15	Christopher Delbosco	Canada	

=== Quarterfinals ===
Heat 1

Rank	Bib	Name	Country	Notes
1	8	Reece Howden	Canada	Q
2	1	François Place	France	Q
3	17	Jonathan Midol	France	
4	25	Sandro Siebenhofer	Austria	

Heat 3

Rank	Bib	Name	Country	Notes
1	6	Niklas Bachsleitner	Germany	Q
2	22	Oliver Davies	Great Britain	Q
3	14	Cornel Renn	Germany	
4	3	Jonas Lenherr	Switzerland	

Heat 2

Rank	Bib	Name	Country	Notes
1	4	Alex Fiva	Switzerland	Q
2	20	Johannes Aujesky	Austria	Q
3	5	Bastien Midol	France	
4	21	Robert Winkler	Austria	

Heat 4

Rank	Bib	Name	Country	Notes
1	10	Johannes Rohrweck	Austria	Q
2	26	Erik Mobärg	Sweden	Q
3	18	Kristofor Mahler	Canada	
4	2	David Mobärg	Sweden	

=== Semifinals ===
Heat 1

Rank	Bib	Name	Country	Notes
1	1	François Place	France	Q
2	4	Alex Fiva	Switzerland	Q
3	8	Reece Howden	Canada	
4	20	Johannes Aujesky	Austria	

Heat 2

Rank	Bib	Name	Country	Notes
1	26	Erik Mobärg	Sweden	Q
2	22	Oliver Davies	Great Britain	Q
3	10	Johannes Rohrweck	Austria	
4	6	Niklas Bachsleitner	Germany	

=== Finals ===
==== Small final ====
Rank	Bib	Name	Country	Notes
5	8	Reece Howden	Canada	
6	6	Niklas Bachsleitner	Germany	
7	20	Johannes Aujesky	Austria	
8	10	Johannes Rohrweck	Austria	

==== Big final ====
Rank	Bib	Name	Country	Notes
1st place, gold medalist(s)	4	Alex Fiva	Switzerland	
2nd place, silver medalist(s)	1	François Place	France	
3rd place, bronze medalist(s)	26	Erik Mobärg	Sweden	
4	22	Oliver Davies	Great Britain	
