= 2020–21 FIS Freestyle Ski World Cup =

Freestyle skiing competitive season

Freestyle Ski World Cup 2020/21
Discipline	Men	Women
Ski Cross	(Canada) Reece Howden (1)	(Switzerland) Fanny Smith (3)
Moguls	(Australia) Matt Graham (1)	(France) Perrine Laffont (4)
Aerials	(Russia) Maxim Burov (2)	(Australia) Laura Peel (2)
Park & Pipe overall	(United States) Colby Stevenson (1)	(France) Tess Ledeux (1)
Halfpipe	(United States) Aaron Blunck (2)	(Canada) Rachael Karker (1)
Slopestyle	(United States) Colby Stevenson (1)	(France) Tess Ledeux (1)
Big Air	(Norway) Birk Ruud (2)	(Switzerland) Giulia Tanno (2)
Cross Alps Tour	(Canada) Reece Howden (1)	(Switzerland) Fanny Smith (1)
- Nations Cup overall: Switzerland (1)

Competition
Locations	20 venues	20 venues
Individual	28 events	28 events
Team	2	2

The 2020–21 FIS Freestyle Ski World Cup was the 42nd World Cup season in freestyle skiing organised by International Ski Federation. The season started on 20 November 2020 and finished on 27 March 2021. This season included six disciplines: moguls, aerials, ski cross, halfpipe, slopestyle and big air.

== Men ==
=== Ski Cross ===
Num	Season	Date	Place	Event	Winner	Second	Third
168	1	15 December 2020	(Switzerland) Arosa	SX	(Sweden) David Mobärg	(Switzerland) Alex Fiva	(Switzerland) Joos Berry
169	2	16 December 2020	(Switzerland) Arosa	SX	(Sweden) Viktor Andersson	(Switzerland) Ryan Regez	(Canada) Kevin Drury
170	3	20 December 2020	(France) Val Thorens	SX	(France) Jonathan Midol	(Canada) Reece Howden	(Germany) Florian Wilmsmann
171	4	21 December 2020	(France) Val Thorens	SX	(Canada) Reece Howden	(Switzerland) Ryan Regez	(France) François Place
	5th Cross Alps Tour Overall (15–21 December 2020)				(Canada) Reece Howden	(Sweden) David Mobärg	(Switzerland) Ryan Regez
172	5	20 January 2021	(Sweden) Idre	SX	(France) Bastien Midol	(Sweden) Viktor Andersson	(France) François Place
173	6	23 January 2021	(Sweden) Idre	SX	(Canada) Reece Howden	(Switzerland) Jonas Lenherr	(Germany) Niklas Bachsleitner
174	7	24 January 2021	(Sweden) Idre	SX	(Canada) Reece Howden	(Switzerland) Ryan Regez	(Switzerland) Jonas Lenherr
	FIS Freestyle Ski and Snowboarding World Championships 2021 (11–13 February)						
175	8	19 February 2021	(Austria) Reiteralm	SX	(Austria) Johannes Rohrweck	(Canada) Reece Howden	(France) Bastien Midol
176	9	27 February 2021	(Georgia (country)) Bakuriani	SX	(Germany) Florian Wilmsmann	(Sweden) David Mobärg	(Canada) Jared Schmidt
177	10	13 March 2021	(Russia) Sunny Valley	SX	(Canada) Reece Howden	(Japan) Ryo Sugai	(Switzerland) Joos Berry
178	11	21 March 2021	(Switzerland) Veysonnaz	SX	(Germany) Florian Wilmsmann	(France) Jonathan Midol	(Germany) Tim Hronek

=== Moguls ===
Num	Season	Date	Place	Event	Winner	Second	Third
346	1	5 December 2020	(Finland) Ruka	MO	(Japan) Ikuma Horishima	(Switzerland) Marco Tadé	(Sweden) Ludvig Fjällström
347	2	12 December 2020	(Sweden) Idre	MO	(France) Benjamin Cavet	(Australia) Brodie Summers	(United States) Nick Page
348	3	4 February 2021	(United States) Deer Valley	MO	(Canada) Mikaël Kingsbury	(France) Benjamin Cavet	(Australia) Matt Graham
	FIS Freestyle Ski and Snowboarding World Championships 2021 (8–11 March)						

=== Dual Moguls ===
Num	Season	Date	Place	Event	Winner	Second	Third
76	1	13 December 2020	(Sweden) Idre	DM	(Sweden) Ludvig Fjällström (Australia) Matt Graham		(Canada) Jordan Kober (United States) Bradley Wilson
77	2	5 February 2021	(United States) Deer Valley	DM	(Canada) Mikaël Kingsbury	(Australia) Matt Graham	(France) Benjamin Cavet
	FIS Freestyle Ski and Snowboarding World Championships 2021 (8–11 March)						

=== Aerials ===
Num	Season	Date	Place	Event	Winner	Second	Third
343	1	4 December 2020	(Finland) Ruka	AE	(Russia) Maxim Burov	(Russia) Pavel Krotov	(Russia) Ilya Burov
344	2	16 January 2021	(Russia) Yaroslavl	AE	(Russia) Maxim Burov	(Russia) Pavel Krotov	(Switzerland) Noé Roth
345	3	17 January 2021	(Russia) Yaroslavl	AE	(Russia) Maxim Burov	(Russia) Stanislav Nikitin	(Canada) Lewis Irving
346	4	23 January 2021	(Russia) Moscow	AE	(Russia) Maxim Burov	(United States) Christopher Lillis	(Switzerland) Noé Roth
347	5	30 January 2021	(Belarus) Minsk	AE	(Russia) Maxim Burov	(Russia) Stanislav Nikitin	(Canada) Lewis Irving
348	6	6 February 2021	(United States) Deer Valley	AE	(Switzerland) Noé Roth	(United States) Justin Schoenefeld	(Switzerland) Pirmin Werner
	FIS Freestyle Ski and Snowboarding World Championships 2021 (8–11 March)						
349	7	13 March 2021	(Kazakhstan) Almaty	AE	(Switzerland) Pirmin Werner	(Switzerland) Nicolas Gygax	(Canada) Lewis Irving

=== Halfpipe ===
Num	Season	Date	Place	Event	Winner	Second	Third
	FIS Freestyle Ski and Snowboarding World Championships 2021 (10–16 March)						
53	31	21 March 2021	(United States) Aspen	HP	(United States) Aaron Blunck	(Canada) Brendan Mackay	(New Zealand) Nico Porteous

=== Slopestyle ===
Num	Season	Date	Place	Event	Winner	Second	Third
39	1	21 November 2020	(Austria) Stubai	SS	(Switzerland) Andri Ragettli	(Norway) Christian Nummedal	(Norway) Ferdinand Dahl
	FIS Freestyle Ski and Snowboarding World Championships 2021 (10–16 March)						
40	2	20 March 2021	(United States) Aspen	SS	(United States) Colby Stevenson	(United States) Mac Forehand	(Sweden) Henrik Harlaut
41	3	27 March 2021	(Switzerland) Silvaplana	SS	(United States) Colby Stevenson	(Norway) Ferdinand Dahl	(United States) Alex Hall

=== Big Air ===
Num	Season	Date	Place	Event	Winner	Second	Third
18	1	9 January 2021	(Austria) Kreischberg	BA	(Norway) Birk Ruud	(France) Antoine Adelisse	(Sweden) Oliwer Magnusson
	FIS Freestyle Ski and Snowboarding World Championships 2021 (10–16 March)						

== Ladies ==
=== Ski Cross ===
Num	Season	Date	Place	Event	Winner	Second	Third
168	1	15 December 2020	(Switzerland) Arosa	SX	(Sweden) Alexandra Edebo	(Switzerland) Fanny Smith	(Australia) Sami Kennedy-Sim
169	2	16 December 2020	(Switzerland) Arosa	SX	(Switzerland) Fanny Smith	(Canada) Marielle Thompson	(Switzerland) Talina Gantenbein
170	3	20 December 2020	(France) Val Thorens	SX	(Switzerland) Fanny Smith	(France) Jade Grillet Aubert	(Canada) Marielle Thompson
171	4	21 December 2020	(France) Val Thorens	SX	(Austria) Katrin Ofner	(Germany) Daniela Maier	(Canada) Marielle Thompson
	5th Cross Alps Tour Overall (15–21 December 2020)				(Switzerland) Fanny Smith	(Canada) Marielle Thompson	(Sweden) Alexandra Edebo
172	5	20 January 2021	(Sweden) Idre	SX	(Switzerland) Fanny Smith	(Canada) Marielle Thompson	(Switzerland) Talina Gantenbein
173	6	23 January 2021	(Sweden) Idre	SX	(France) Alizée Baron	(France) Marielle Berger Sabbatel	(Switzerland) Fanny Smith
174	7	24 January 2021	(Sweden) Idre	SX	(Switzerland) Fanny Smith	(France) Alizée Baron	(Canada) Marielle Thompson
	FIS Freestyle Ski and Snowboarding World Championships 2021 (11–13 February)						
175	8	19 February 2021	(Austria) Reiteralm	SX	(Sweden) Sandra Näslund	(Switzerland) Fanny Smith	(Canada) Courtney Hoffos
176	9	27 February 2021	(Georgia (country)) Bakuriani	SX	(Switzerland) Fanny Smith	(Sweden) Sandra Näslund	(France) Marielle Berger Sabbatel
177	10	13 March 2021	(Russia) Sunny Valley	SX	(Switzerland) Fanny Smith	(Sweden) Sandra Näslund	(Austria) Katrin Ofner
178	11	21 March 2021	(Switzerland) Veysonnaz	SX	(Sweden) Sandra Näslund	(Switzerland) Fanny Smith	(France) Alizée Baron

=== Moguls ===
Num	Season	Date	Place	Event	Winner	Second	Third
346	1	5 December 2020	(Finland) Ruka	MO	(France) Perrine Laffont	(United States) Jaelin Kauf	(Russia) Anastasia Smirnova
347	2	12 December 2020	(Sweden) Idre	MO	(France) Perrine Laffont	(Japan) Anri Kawamura	(United States) Hannah Soar
348	3	4 February 2021	(United States) Deer Valley	MO	(France) Perrine Laffont	(Japan) Anri Kawamura	(Japan) Kisara Sumiyoshi
	FIS Freestyle Ski and Snowboarding World Championships 2021 (8–11 March)						

=== Dual Moguls ===
Num	Season	Date	Place	Event	Winner	Second	Third
75	1	13 December 2020	(Sweden) Idre	DM	(France) Perrine Laffont	(United States) Jaelin Kauf	(Japan) Anri Kawamura
76	2	5 February 2021	(United States) Deer Valley	DM	(United States) Kai Owens	(United States) Hannah Soar	(United States) Tess Johnson
	FIS Freestyle Ski and Snowboarding World Championships 2021 (8–11 March)						

=== Aerials ===
Num	Season	Date	Place	Event	Winner	Second	Third
343	1	4 December 2020	(Finland) Ruka	AE	(Australia) Laura Peel	(Germany) Emma Weiß	(Russia) Anastasiia Prytkova
344	2	16 January 2021	(Russia) Yaroslavl	AE	(Australia) Laura Peel	(United States) Ashley Caldwell	(Russia) Liubov Nikitina
345	3	17 January 2021	(Russia) Yaroslavl	AE	(United States) Megan Nick	(Belarus) Alla Tsuper	(United States) Kaila Kuhn
346	4	23 January 2021	(Russia) Moscow	AE	(United States) Winter Vinecki	(Australia) Laura Peel	(Canada) Marion Thénault
347	5	30 January 2021	(Belarus) Minsk	AE	(United States) Megan Nick	(Australia) Laura Peel	(United States) Winter Vinecki
348	6	6 February 2021	(United States) Deer Valley	AE	(Australia) Danielle Scott	(United States) Winter Vinecki	(United States) Kaila Kuhn
	FIS Freestyle Ski and Snowboarding World Championships 2021 (8–11 March)						
349	7	13 March 2021	(Kazakhstan) Almaty	AE	(Canada) Marion Thénault	(Russia) Liubov Nikitina	(Kazakhstan) Zhanbota Aldabergenova

=== Halfpipe ===
Num	Season	Date	Place	Event	Winner	Second	Third
	FIS Freestyle Ski and Snowboarding World Championships 2021 (10–16 March)						
53	31	21 March 2021	(United States) Aspen	HP	(Canada) Rachael Karker	(United Kingdom) Zoe Atkin	(United States) Brita Sigourney

=== Slopestyle ===
Num	Season	Date	Place	Event	Winner	Second	Third
39	1	21 November 2020	(Austria) Stubai	SS	(France) Tess Ledeux	(Norway) Johanne Killi	(China) Eileen Gu
	FIS Freestyle Ski and Snowboarding World Championships 2021 (10–16 March)						
40	2	20 March 2021	(United States) Aspen	SS	(France) Tess Ledeux	(United Kingdom) Kirsty Muir	(Russia) Anastasia Tatalina
41	3	27 March 2021	(Switzerland) Silvaplana	SS	(France) Tess Ledeux	(Switzerland) Sarah Höfflin	(Switzerland) Mathilde Gremaud

=== Big Air ===
Num	Season	Date	Place	Event	Winner	Second	Third
18	1	9 January 2021	(Austria) Kreischberg	BA	(Switzerland) Giulia Tanno	(France) Tess Ledeux	(Estonia) Kelly Sildaru
	FIS Freestyle Ski and Snowboarding World Championships 2021 (10–16 March)						

== Team ==
=== Ski Cross Team ===
Num	Season	Date	Place	Event	Winner	Second	Third
	1	28 February 2021	(Georgia (country)) Bakuriani	SXT	Switzerland I Jonas Lenherr; Fanny Smith	Canada II Christopher Del Bosco; Courtney Hoffos	Sweden I David Mobärg; Sandra Näslund

=== Team Aerials ===
Num	Season	Date	Place	Event	Winner	Second	Third
343	1	17 January 2021	(Russia) Yaroslavl	AET	Russia I Anastasiia Prytkova; Maxim Burov; Pavel Krotov	Switzerland Carol Bouvard; Pirmin Werner; Noé Roth	United States Ashley Caldwell; Eric Loughran; Justin Schoenefeld
	FIS Freestyle Ski and Snowboarding World Championships 2021 (8–11 March)						

== Men's standings ==
=== Ski Cross ===
Rank	after all 11 races	Points
1	(Canada) Reece Howden	691
2	(Switzerland) Jonas Lenherr	405
3	(France) Bastien Midol	395
4	(Germany) Florian Wilmsmann	393
5	(Sweden) David Mobärg	379

=== Ski Cross Alps Tour ===
Rank	after all 4 races	Points
1	(Canada) Reece Howden	225
2	(Sweden) David Mobärg	190
3	(Switzerland) Ryan Regez	180
4	(France) Jonathan Midol	150
5	(France) François Place	146

=== Moguls ===
Rank	after all 5 races	Points
1	(Australia) Matt Graham	289
2	(France) Benjamin Cavet	271
3	(Sweden) Ludvig Fjällström	258
4	(Japan) Ikuma Horishima	246
5	(Australia) Brodie Summers	210

=== Aerials ===
Rank	after all 7 events	Points
1	(Russia) Maxim Burov	526
2	(Switzerland) Noé Roth	320
3	(Switzerland) Pirmin Werner	305
4	(Russia) Stanislav Nikitin	264
5	(Russia) Pavel Krotov	247

=== Park & Pipe overall (HP/SS/BA) ===
Rank	after all 5 races	Points
1	(United States) Colby Stevenson	245
2	(Norway) Ferdinand Dahl	172
3	(Sweden) Oliwer Magnusson	155
4	(Switzerland) Andri Ragettli	145
5	(Norway) Christian Nummedal	144

=== Halfpipe ===
Rank	after all 1 race	Points
1	(United States) Aaron Blunck	100
2	(Canada) Brendan Mackay	80
3	(New Zealand) Nico Porteous	60
4	(United States) David Wise	50
5	(United States) Birk Irving	45

=== Slopestyle ===
Rank	after all 3 races	Points
1	(United States) Colby Stevenson	245
2	(Norway) Ferdinand Dahl	172
3	(Norway) Christian Nummedal	114
4	(Norway) Sebastian Schjerve	114
5	(United States) Alex Hall	105

=== Big Air ===
Rank	after all 1 race	Points
1	(Norway) Birk Ruud	100
2	(France) Antoine Adelisse	80
3	(Sweden) Oliwer Magnusson	60
4	(Switzerland) Kim Gubser	50
5	(Switzerland) Andri Ragettli	45

== Ladies' standings ==
=== Ski Cross ===
Rank	after all 11 races	Points
1	(Switzerland) Fanny Smith	945
2	(France) Alizée Baron	495
3	(Canada) Marielle Thompson	475
4	(France) Marielle Berger Sabbatel	474
5	(Austria) Katrin Ofner	439

=== Ski Cross Alps Tour ===
Rank	after all 4 races	Points
1	(Switzerland) Fanny Smith	325
2	(Canada) Marielle Thompson	206
3	(Sweden) Alexandra Edebo	168
4	(Germany) Daniela Maier	155
5	(France) Jade Grillet-Aubert	147

=== Moguls ===
Rank	after all 5 races	Points
1	(France) Perrine Laffont	445
2	(Japan) Anri Kawamura	270
3	(United States) Hannah Soar	250
4	(United States) Kai Owens	234
5	(United States) Jaelin Kauf	233

=== Aerials ===
Rank	after all 7 events	Points
1	(Australia) Laura Peel	450
2	(United States) Winter Vinecki	343
3	(Canada) Marion Thénault	312
4	(Russia) Liubov Nikitina	286
5	(Germany) Emma Weiß	251

=== Park & Pipe overall (HP/SS/BA) ===
Rank	after all 5 races	Points
1	(France) Tess Ledeux	380
2	(Switzerland) Mathilde Gremaud	159
3	(Switzerland) Sarah Höfflin	151
4	(China) Eileen Gu	146
5	(United Kingdom) Kirsty Muir	130

=== Halfpipe ===
Rank	after all 1 race	Points
1	(Canada) Rachael Karker	100
2	(United Kingdom) Zoe Atkin	80
3	(United States) Brita Sigourney	60
4	(United States) Devin Logan	50
5	(Russia) Valeriya Demidova	45

=== Slopestyle ===
Rank	after all 3 races	Points
1	(France) Tess Ledeux	300
2	(United Kingdom) Kirsty Muir	124
3	(Switzerland) Sarah Höfflin	119
4	(United Kingdom) Katie Summerhayes	115
5	(Switzerland) Mathilde Gremaud	114

=== Big Air ===
Rank	after all 1 race	Points
1	(Switzerland) Giulia Tanno	100
2	(France) Tess Ledeux	80
3	(Estonia) Kelly Sildaru	60
4	(Italy) Silvia Bertagna	50
5	(Switzerland) Mathilde Gremaud	45

== Team ==
=== Team Aerials ===
Rank	after all 1 event	Points
1	Russia I	100
2	Switzerland	80
3	United States	60
4	Russia II	50
5	Belarus	45

=== Ski Cross Team ===
Rank	after all 1 race	Points
1	Switzerland I	100
2	Canada II	80
3	Sweden I	60
4	Canada III	50
5	Canada I	45

== Nations Cup ==
=== Overall ===
Rank	after all 58 races	Points
1	Switzerland	4509
2	Canada	4252
3	France	3671
4	United States	3604
5	Russia	2615
