= 2022–23 FIS Freestyle Ski World Cup =

Freestyle skiing competitive season

Discipline	Men	Women
Ski Cross	(Canada) Reece Howden (2)	(Sweden) Sandra Näslund (4)
Overall Moguls	(Canada) Mikaël Kingsbury (11)	(France) Perrine Laffont (5)
Moguls	(Canada) Mikaël Kingsbury (2)	(Australia) Jakara Anthony (1)
Dual Moguls	(Canada) Mikaël Kingsbury (2)	(France) Perrine Laffont (1)
Aerials	(Switzerland) Noé Roth (2)	(Australia) Danielle Scott (1)
Park & Pipe Overall	(Norway) Birk Ruud (2)	(Norway) Johanne Killi (1)
Halfpipe	(United States) Birk Irving (1)	(Canada) Rachael Karker (2)
Slopestyle	(Norway) Birk Ruud (1)	(Norway) Johanne Killi (1)
Big Air	(Norway) Birk Ruud (3)	(France) Tess Ledeux (2)
- Nations Cup overall: Canada (14)

Competition
Edition	51st	51st
Locations	31	31
Individual	51	51
Team	2	2
Cancelled	6	6

The 2022/23 FIS Freestyle Ski World Cup, organized by the International Ski Federation was the 51st World Cup in freestyle skiing for men and women. The season started on 21 October 2022 in Chur, Switzerland and concluded on 25 March 2023 in Silvaplana, Switzerland. This season included six disciplines: moguls, aerials, ski cross, halfpipe, slopestyle and big air.

== Map of world cup hosts ==
All 27 locations hosting world cup events in this season.

Alps 2022–23 FIS Freestyle Ski World Cup (Alps) North America 2022–23 FIS Freestyle Ski World Cup (North America)	Europe Asia 2022–23 FIS Freestyle Ski World Cup (Asia) World Championships (not included in the World Cup)

== Men ==
=== Calendar ===
==== Ski Cross (SX) ====
Num	Season	Date	Place	Winner	Second	Third	Discipline leader	Ref.
		5 November 2022	(France) Les Deux Alpes	cancelled				
191	1	8 December 2022	(France) Val Thorens	(Austria) Johannes Rohrweck	(Germany) Tobias Müller	(Switzerland) Jonas Lenherr	(Austria) Johannes Rohrweck	
192	2	9 December 2022	(France) Val Thorens	(Austria) Mathias Graf	(France) Youri Duplessis Kergomard	(Switzerland) Marc Bischofberger	(Austria) Mathias Graf	
193	3	12 December 2022	(Switzerland) Arosa	(France) Terence Tchiknavorian	(Canada) Reece Howden	(Sweden) David Mobärg	(Austria) Mathias Graf	
194	4	21 December 2022	(Italy) Innichen	(Austria) Mathias Graf	(Canada) Reece Howden	(Canada) Brady Leman	(Austria) Mathias Graf	
195	5	22 December 2022	(Italy) Innichen	(Canada) Reece Howden	(Japan) Ryo Sugai	(Germany) Niklas Bachsleitner	(Canada) Reece Howden	
7th Cross Alps Tour Overall (8–22 December 2022)				(Canada) Reece Howden	(Austria) Mathias Graf	(Germany) Florian Wilmsmann	(Canada) Reece Howden	
		28 December 2022	(Italy) Alleghe	cancelled				
		29 December 2022	(Italy) Alleghe	cancelled				
196	6	21 January 2023	(Sweden) Idre Fjäll	(Sweden) David Mobärg	(Canada) Reece Howden	(Sweden) Erik Mobärg	(Canada) Reece Howden	
197	7	22 January 2023	(Sweden) Idre Fjäll	(Canada) Reece Howden	(Sweden) Erik Mobärg	(Germany) Tobias Müller	(Canada) Reece Howden	
		28 January 2023	(France) Megève	cancelled				
		29 January 2023	(France) Megève	cancelled				
198	8	16 February 2023	(Austria) Reiteralm	(Sweden) David Mobärg	(France) Youri Duplessis Kergomard	(France) Bastien Midol	(Canada) Reece Howden	
199	9	17 February 2023	(Austria) Reiteralm	(Switzerland) Jonas Lenherr	(United Kingdom) Oliver Davies	(United States) Tyler Wallasch	(Canada) Reece Howden	
FIS Freestyle Ski and Snowboarding World Championships 2023 (19 February – 4 March)
World Championships		26 February 2023	(Georgia (country)) Bakuriani	(Italy) Simone Deromedis	(Germany) Florian Wilmsmann	(Sweden) Erik Mobärg	not included in the World Cup	
		4 March 2023	(Germany) Oberwiesenthal	cancelled				
		5 March 2023	(Germany) Oberwiesenthal	cancelled				
200	10	12 March 2023	(Switzerland) Veysonnaz	(Sweden) David Mobärg	(Japan) Ryo Sugai	(Canada) Reece Howden	(Canada) Reece Howden	
201	11	17 March 2023	(Canada) Craigleith	(Canada) Reece Howden	(Germany) Florian Wilmsmann	(France) Youri Duplessis Kergomard	(Canada) Reece Howden	
202	12	18 March 2023	(Canada) Craigleith	(Canada) Brady Leman	(France) Youri Duplessis Kergomard	(Switzerland) Joos Berry	(Canada) Reece Howden	

==== Moguls (MO) ====
Num	Season	Date	Place	Winner	Second	Third	Discipline leader	Ref.
357	1	3 December 2022	(Finland) Ruka	(Canada) Mikaël Kingsbury	(Japan) Ikuma Horishima	(Australia) Matt Graham	(Canada) Mikaël Kingsbury	
358	2	10 December 2022	(Sweden) Idre Fjäll	(United States) Nick Page	(Canada) Mikaël Kingsbury	(Sweden) Walter Wallberg	(Canada) Mikaël Kingsbury	
359	3	16 December 2022	(France) Alpe d'Huez	(Japan) Ikuma Horishima	(Canada) Mikaël Kingsbury	(United States) Cole McDonald	(Canada) Mikaël Kingsbury	
360	4	27 January 2023	(Canada) Val Saint-Côme	(Canada) Mikaël Kingsbury	(Sweden) Walter Wallberg	(Japan) Ikuma Horishima	(Canada) Mikaël Kingsbury	
361	5	2 February 2023	(United States) Deer Valley	(Australia) Matt Graham	(Canada) Mikaël Kingsbury	(France) Benjamin Cavet	(Canada) Mikaël Kingsbury	
FIS Freestyle Ski and Snowboarding World Championships 2023 (19 February – 4 March)
World Championships		25 February 2023	(Georgia (country)) Bakuriani	(Canada) Mikaël Kingsbury	(Australia) Matt Graham	(Sweden) Walter Wallberg	not included in the World Cup	
362	6	17 March 2023	(Kazakhstan) Almaty	(Canada) Mikaël Kingsbury	(Kazakhstan) Pavel Kolmakov	(Australia) Matt Graham	(Canada) Mikaël Kingsbury	

==== Dual Moguls (DM) ====
Num	Season	Date	Place	Winner	Second	Third	Discipline leader	Ref.
81	1	11 December 2022	(Sweden) Idre Fjäll	(Canada) Mikaël Kingsbury	(Sweden) Filip Gravenfors	(United States) Nick Page	(Canada) Mikaël Kingsbury	
82	2	17 December 2022	(France) Alpe d'Huez	(Japan) Ikuma Horishima	(France) Benjamin Cavet	(Sweden) Walter Wallberg	(Japan) Ikuma Horishima	
83	3	28 January 2023	(Canada) Val Saint-Côme	(Sweden) Walter Wallberg	(Canada) Mikaël Kingsbury	(Sweden) Filip Gravenfors	(Sweden) Walter Wallberg	
84	4	4 February 2023	(United States) Deer Valley	(Canada) Mikaël Kingsbury	(Australia) Matt Graham	(Sweden) Walter Wallberg	(Canada) Mikaël Kingsbury	
85	5	11 February 2023	(Italy) Valmalenco	(Japan) Ikuma Horishima	(Canada) Mikaël Kingsbury	(Canada) Julien Viel	(Canada) Mikaël Kingsbury	
FIS Freestyle Ski and Snowboarding World Championships 2023 (19 February – 4 March)
World Championships		26 February 2023	(Georgia (country)) Bakuriani	(Canada) Mikaël Kingsbury	(Sweden) Walter Wallberg	(Australia) Matt Graham	not included in the World Cup	
86	6	18 March 2023	(Kazakhstan) Almaty	(Canada) Mikaël Kingsbury	(Sweden) Walter Wallberg	(Australia) Matt Graham	(Canada) Mikaël Kingsbury	

==== Aerials (AE) ====
Num	Season	Date	Place	Winner	Second	Third	Discipline leader	Ref.
356	1	4 December 2022	(Finland) Ruka	(Switzerland) Pirmin Werner	(Switzerland) Noé Roth	(Canada) Lewis Irving	(Switzerland) Pirmin Werner	
357	2	21 January 2023	(Canada) Le Relais	(United States) Quinn Dehlinger	(Switzerland) Noé Roth	(Ukraine) Dmytro Kotovskyi	(Switzerland) Noé Roth	
358	3	22 January 2023	(Canada) Le Relais	(Switzerland) Noé Roth	(Ukraine) Dmytro Kotovskyi	(United States) Christopher Lillis	(Switzerland) Noé Roth	
359	4	3 February 2023	(United States) Deer Valley	(Ukraine) Dmytro Kotovskyi	(China) Li Tianma	(China) Chen Shuo	(Switzerland) Noé Roth	
FIS Freestyle Ski and Snowboarding World Championships 2023 (19 February – 4 March)
World Championships		23 February 2023	(Georgia (country)) Bakuriani	(Switzerland) Noé Roth	(United States) Quinn Dehlinger	(China) Yang Longxiao	not included in the World Cup	
360	5	4 March 2023	(Switzerland) Engadin	(Ukraine) Dmytro Kotovskyi	(Switzerland) Noé Roth	(United States) Christopher Lillis	(Ukraine) Dmytro Kotovskyi	
361	6	19 March 2023	(Kazakhstan) Almaty	(Switzerland) Pirmin Werner	(Switzerland) Noé Roth	(Canada) Émile Nadeau	(Switzerland) Noé Roth	

==== Halfpipe (HP) ====
Num	Season	Date	Place	Winner	Second	Third	Discipline leader	Ref.
58	1	17 December 2022	(United States) Copper Mountain	(United States) Birk Irving	(Canada) Brendan Mackay	(Canada) Noah Bowman	(United States) Birk Irving	
59	2	19 January 2023	(Canada) Calgary	(Finland) Jon Sallinen	(Canada) Brendan Mackay	(Canada) Simon d'Artois	(Canada) Brendan Mackay	
60	3	21 January 2023	(Canada) Calgary	(United States) Alex Ferreira	(United States) Birk Irving	(Canada) Noah Bowman	(United States) Birk Irving	
61	4	3 February 2023	(United States) Mammoth Mountain	(United States) Birk Irving	(Canada) Brendan Mackay	(United States) David Wise	(United States) Birk Irving	
FIS Freestyle Ski and Snowboarding World Championships 2023 (19 February – 4 March)
World Championships		4 March 2023	(Georgia (country)) Bakuriani	(Canada) Brendan Mackay	(Finland) Jon Sallinen	(United States) Alex Ferreira	not included in the World Cup	
		11 March 2023	(China) Secret Garden	cancelled				

==== Slopestyle (SS) ====
Num	Season	Date	Place	Winner	Second	Third	Discipline leader	Ref.
47	1	19 November 2022	(Austria) Stubai	(Norway) Birk Ruud	(Switzerland) Andri Ragettli	(United States) Colby Stevenson	(Norway) Birk Ruud	
48	2	14 January 2023	(France) Font Romeu	cancelled				
49	3	22 January 2023	(Switzerland) Laax	(Switzerland) Andri Ragettli	(United States) Alexander Hall	(Norway) Birk Ruud	(Switzerland) Andri Ragettli	
50	4	4 February 2023	(United States) Mammoth Mountain	(Norway) Birk Ruud	(Norway) Sebastian Schjerve	(Switzerland) Andri Ragettli	(Norway) Birk Ruud	
FIS Freestyle Ski and Snowboarding World Championships 2023 (19 February – 4 March)
World Championships		28 February 2023	(Georgia (country)) Bakuriani	(Norway) Birk Ruud	(Norway) Christian Nummedal	(Switzerland) Andri Ragettli	not included in the World Cup	
51	5	18 March 2023	(France) Tignes	(Norway) Birk Ruud	(Sweden) Jesper Tjäder	(Switzerland) Andri Ragettli	(Norway) Birk Ruud	
52	6	25 March 2023	(Switzerland) Silvaplana	(Sweden) Jesper Tjäder	(Canada) Evan McEachran	(Norway) Birk Ruud	(Norway) Birk Ruud	

==== Big Air (BA) ====
Num	Season	Date	Place	Winner	Second	Third	Discipline leader	Ref.
20	1	21 October 2022	(Switzerland) Chur	(Norway) Birk Ruud	(Canada) Noah Porter MacLennan	(United States) Troy Podmilsak	(Norway) Birk Ruud	
		25 November 2022	(Sweden) Falun	cancelled				
21	2	16 December 2022	(United States) Copper Mountain	(Norway) Birk Ruud	(France) Timothé Sivignon	(Norway) Sebastian Schjerve	(Norway) Birk Ruud	
FIS Freestyle Ski and Snowboarding World Championships 2023 (19 February – 4 March)
World Championships		4 March 2023	(Georgia (country)) Bakuriani	(United States) Troy Podmilsak	(Austria) Lukas Müllauer	(Norway) Birk Ruud	not included in the World Cup	

=== Standings ===
==== Ski Cross ====
Rank	after all 12 events	Points
	(Canada) Reece Howden	725
2	(Sweden) David Mobärg	574
3	(Germany) Florian Wilmsmann	508
4	(France) Youri Duplessis Kergomard	430
5	(Canada) Brady Leman	354

==== Ski Cross Alps Tour ====
Rank	after all 5 events	Points
1	(Canada) Reece Howden	301
2	(Austria) Mathias Graf	279
3	(Germany) Florian Wilmsmann	181
4	(Japan) Ryo Sugai	173
5	(Germany) Tobias Mueller	170

==== Overall Moguls ====
Rank	after all 12 events	Points
	(Canada) Mikaël Kingsbury	1002
2	(Japan) Ikuma Horishima	660
3	(Sweden) Walter Wallberg	607
4	(Australia) Matt Graham	592
5	(United States) Nick Page	434

==== Moguls ====
Rank	after all 6 events	Points
	(Canada) Mikaël Kingsbury	540
2	(Australia) Matt Graham	336
3	(Japan) Ikuma Horishima	329
4	(United States) Nick Page	292
5	(Sweden) Walter Wallberg	233

==== Dual Moguls ====
Rank	after all 6 events	Points
	(Canada) Mikaël Kingsbury	462
2	(Sweden) Walter Wallberg	374
3	(Japan) Ikuma Horishima	331
4	(Sweden) Filip Gravenfors	265
5	(Australia) Matt Graham	256

==== Aerials ====
Rank	after all 6 events	Points
	(Switzerland) Noé Roth	429
2	(Ukraine) Dmytro Kotovskyi	371
3	(Switzerland) Pirmin Werner	302
4	(United States) Christopher Lillis	279
5	(United States) Quinn Dehlinger	204

==== Park & Pipe Overall (HP/SS/BA) ====
Rank	after all 11 events	Points
	(Norway) Birk Ruud	560
2	(Switzerland) Andri Ragettli	365
3	(United States) Birk Irving	320
4	(Sweden) Jesper Tjäder	310
5	(Canada) Brendan Mackay	272

==== Halfpipe ====
Rank	after all 4 events	Points
	(United States) Birk Irving	320
2	(Canada) Brendan Mackay	272
3	(United States) Alex Ferreira	200
4	(Finland) Jon Sallinen	181
5	(United States) David Wise	170

==== Slopestyle ====
Rank	after all 5 events	Points
	(Norway) Birk Ruud	360
2	(Switzerland) Andri Ragettli	300
3	(Sweden) Jesper Tjäder	250
4	(United States) Alexander Hall	201
5	(Norway) Sebastian Schjerve	175

==== Big Air ====
Rank	after all 2 events	Points
	(Norway) Birk Ruud	200
2	(United States) Troy Podmilsak	100
3	(Canada) Noah Porter Maclennan	96
4	(Norway) Sebastian Schjerve	84
5	(France) Timothe Sivignon	80

== Women ==
=== Calendar ===
==== Ski Cross (SX) ====
Num	Season	Date	Place	Winner	Second	Third	Discipline leader	Ref.
		5 November 2022	(France) Les Deux Alpes	cancelled				
191	1	8 December 2022	(France) Val Thorens	(Sweden) Sandra Näslund	(Canada) Marielle Thompson	(Switzerland) Talina Gantenbein	(Sweden) Sandra Näslund	
192	2	9 December 2022	(France) Val Thorens	(Sweden) Sandra Näslund	(Canada) Hannah Schmidt	(Germany) Daniela Maier	(Sweden) Sandra Näslund	
193	3	12 December 2022	(Switzerland) Arosa	(Sweden) Sandra Näslund	(Canada) Marielle Thompson	(Germany) Daniela Maier	(Sweden) Sandra Näslund	
194	4	21 December 2022	(Italy) Innichen	(Sweden) Sandra Näslund	(Switzerland) Fanny Smith	(Canada) Marielle Thompson	(Sweden) Sandra Näslund	
195	5	22 December 2022	(Italy) Innichen	(Sweden) Sandra Näslund	(Austria) Andrea Limbacher	(Austria) Sonja Gigler (Switzerland) Fanny Smith	(Sweden) Sandra Näslund	
7th Cross Alps Tour Overall (8–22 December 2022)				(Sweden) Sandra Näslund	(Canada) Marielle Thompson	(Switzerland) Fanny Smith	(Sweden) Sandra Näslund	
		28 December 2022	(Italy) Alleghe	cancelled				
		29 December 2022	(Italy) Alleghe	cancelled				
196	6	21 January 2023	(Sweden) Idre Fjäll	(Sweden) Sandra Näslund	(Switzerland) Fanny Smith	(Germany) Daniela Maier	(Sweden) Sandra Näslund	
197	7	22 January 2023	(Sweden) Idre Fjäll	(Sweden) Sandra Näslund	(Austria) Katrin Ofner	(Canada) Marielle Thompson	(Sweden) Sandra Näslund	
		28 January 2023	(France) Megève	cancelled				
		29 January 2023	(France) Megève	cancelled				
198	8	16 February 2023	(Austria) Reiteralm	(Sweden) Sandra Näslund	(Canada) Marielle Thompson	(Germany) Daniela Maier	(Sweden) Sandra Näslund	
199	9	17 February 2023	(Austria) Reiteralm	(Sweden) Sandra Näslund	(Austria) Sonja Gigler	(Italy) Jole Galli	(Sweden) Sandra Näslund	
FIS Freestyle Ski and Snowboarding World Championships 2023 (19 February – 4 March)
World Championships		26 February 2023	(Georgia (country)) Bakuriani	(Sweden) Sandra Näslund	(Austria) Katrin Ofner	(Switzerland) Fanny Smith	not included in the World Cup	
		4 March 2023	(Germany) Oberwiesenthal	cancelled				
		5 March 2023	(Germany) Oberwiesenthal	cancelled				
200	10	12 March 2023	(Switzerland) Veysonnaz	(Switzerland) Fanny Smith	(France) Jade Grillet Aubert	(Canada) Tiana Gairns	(Sweden) Sandra Näslund	
201	11	17 March 2023	(Canada) Craigleith	(Switzerland) Fanny Smith	(Canada) Courtney Hoffos	(Canada) Marielle Thompson	(Sweden) Sandra Näslund	
202	12	18 March 2023	(Canada) Craigleith	(France) Marielle Berger Sabbatel	(Canada) Marielle Thompson	(Canada) Brittany Phelan	(Sweden) Sandra Näslund	

==== Moguls (MO) ====
Num	Season	Date	Place	Winner	Second	Third	Discipline leader	Ref.
357	1	3 December 2022	(Finland) Ruka	(Australia) Jakara Anthony	(France) Perrine Laffont	(Japan) Anri Kawamura	(Australia) Jakara Anthony	
358	2	10 December 2022	(Sweden) Idre Fjäll	(Australia) Jakara Anthony	(Japan) Anri Kawamura	(France) Perrine Laffont	(Australia) Jakara Anthony	
359	3	16 December 2022	(France) Alpe d'Huez	(Australia) Jakara Anthony	(France) Perrine Laffont	(United States) Elizabeth Lemley	(Australia) Jakara Anthony	
360	4	27 January 2023	(Canada) Val Saint-Côme	(Japan) Anri Kawamura	(Australia) Jakara Anthony	(United States) Jaelin Kauf	(Australia) Jakara Anthony	
361	5	2 February 2023	(United States) Deer Valley	(Australia) Jakara Anthony	(United States) Jaelin Kauf	(France) Perrine Laffont	(Australia) Jakara Anthony	
FIS Freestyle Ski and Snowboarding World Championships 2023 (19 February – 4 March)
World Championships		25 February 2023	(Georgia (country)) Bakuriani	(France) Perrine Laffont	(United States) Jaelin Kauf	(Austria) Avital Carroll	not included in the World Cup	
362	6	17 March 2023	(Kazakhstan) Almaty	(France) Perrine Laffont	(United States) Jaelin Kauf	(United States) Tess Johnson	(Australia) Jakara Anthony	

==== Dual Moguls (DM) ====
Num	Season	Date	Place	Winner	Second	Third	Discipline leader	Ref.
81	1	11 December 2022	(Sweden) Idre Fjäll	(United States) Elizabeth Lemley	(Japan) Anri Kawamura	(France) Perrine Laffont	(United States) Elizabeth Lemley	
82	2	17 December 2022	(France) Alpe d'Huez	(Japan) Anri Kawamura	(France) Perrine Laffont	(Australia) Jakara Anthony	(Japan) Anri Kawamura	
83	3	28 January 2023	(Canada) Val Saint-Côme	(Japan) Anri Kawamura	(France) Perrine Laffont	(United Kingdom) Makayla Gerken Schofield	(Japan) Anri Kawamura	
84	4	4 February 2023	(United States) Deer Valley	(France) Perrine Laffont	(United States) Jaelin Kauf	(United States) Hannah Soar	(Japan) Anri Kawamura	
85	5	11 February 2023	(Italy) Valmalenco	(France) Perrine Laffont	(United States) Elizabeth Lemley	(Japan) Anri Kawamura	(France) Perrine Laffont	
FIS Freestyle Ski and Snowboarding World Championships 2023 (19 February – 4 March)
World Championships		26 February 2023	(Georgia (country)) Bakuriani	(France) Perrine Laffont	(United States) Jaelin Kauf	(Austria) Avital Carroll	not included in the World Cup	
86	6	18 March 2023	(Kazakhstan) Almaty	(France) Perrine Laffont	(United States) Jaelin Kauf	(United States) Olivia Giaccio	(France) Perrine Laffont	

==== Aerials (AE) ====
Num	Season	Date	Place	Winner	Second	Third	Discipline leader	Ref.
356	1	4 December 2022	(Finland) Ruka	(Australia) Danielle Scott	(Canada) Marion Thénault	(Kazakhstan) Zhanbota Aldabergenova	(Australia) Danielle Scott	
357	2	21 January 2023	(Canada) Le Relais	(Canada) Marion Thénault	(United States) Ashley Caldwell	(Ukraine) Anastasiya Novosad	(Canada) Marion Thénault	
358	3	22 January 2023	(Canada) Le Relais	(Australia) Laura Peel	(United States) Ashley Caldwell	(Ukraine) Anastasiya Novosad	(Canada) Marion Thénault	
359	4	3 February 2023	(United States) Deer Valley	(Australia) Danielle Scott	(Canada) Marion Thénault	(China) Kong Fanyu	(Australia) Danielle Scott	
FIS Freestyle Ski and Snowboarding World Championships 2023 (19 February – 4 March)
World Championships		23 February 2023	(Georgia (country)) Bakuriani	(China) Kong Fanyu	(Australia) Danielle Scott	(Ukraine) Anastasiya Novosad	not included in the World Cup	
360	5	5 March 2023	(Switzerland) Engadin	(Australia) Danielle Scott	(Australia) Laura Peel	(China) Kong Fanyu	(Australia) Danielle Scott	
361	6	19 March 2023	(Kazakhstan) Almaty	(Australia) Laura Peel	(Australia) Danielle Scott	(Canada) Marion Thénault	(Australia) Danielle Scott	

==== Halfpipe (HP) ====
Num	Season	Date	Place	Winner	Second	Third	Discipline leader	Ref.
58	1	17 December 2022	(United States) Copper Mountain	(Canada) Rachael Karker	(Canada) Amy Fraser	(Estonia) Kelly Sildaru	(Canada) Rachael Karker	
59	2	19 January 2023	(Canada) Calgary	(China) Eileen Gu	(Canada) Rachael Karker	(United States) Hanna Faulhaber	(Canada) Rachael Karker	
60	3	21 January 2023	(Canada) Calgary	(China) Eileen Gu	(Canada) Rachael Karker	(China) Zhang Kexin	(Canada) Rachael Karker	
61	4	3 February 2023	(United States) Mammoth Mountain	(China) Zhang Kexin	(United Kingdom) Zoe Atkin	(Canada) Rachael Karker	(Canada) Rachael Karker	
FIS Freestyle Ski and Snowboarding World Championships 2023 (19 February – 4 March)
World Championships		4 March 2023	(Georgia (country)) Bakuriani	(United States) Hanna Faulhaber	(United Kingdom) Zoe Atkin	(Canada) Rachael Karker	not included in the World Cup	
		11 March 2023	(China) Secret Garden	cancelled				

==== Slopestyle (SS) ====
Num	Season	Date	Place	Winner	Second	Third	Discipline leader	Ref.
47	1	19 November 2022	(Austria) Stubai	(Norway) Johanne Killi	(Estonia) Kelly Sildaru	(United States) Grace Henderson	(Norway) Johanne Killi	
48	2	14 January 2023	(France) Font Romeu	cancelled				
49	3	22 January 2023	(Switzerland) Laax	(Norway) Johanne Killi	(Switzerland) Sarah Höfflin	(France) Tess Ledeux	(Norway) Johanne Killi	
50	4	4 February 2023	(United States) Mammoth Mountain	(Norway) Johanne Killi	(United Kingdom) Kirsty Muir	(New Zealand) Ruby Star Andrews	(Norway) Johanne Killi	
FIS Freestyle Ski and Snowboarding World Championships 2023 (19 February – 4 March)
World Championships		28 February 2023	(Georgia (country)) Bakuriani	(Switzerland) Mathilde Gremaud	(Canada) Megan Oldham	(Norway) Johanne Killi	not included in the World Cup	
51	5	18 March 2023	(France) Tignes	(Switzerland) Mathilde Gremaud	(Norway) Johanne Killi	(Canada) Megan Oldham	(Norway) Johanne Killi	
52	6	25 March 2023	(Switzerland) Silvaplana	(France) Tess Ledeux	(Switzerland) Sarah Höfflin	(Norway) Johanne Killi	(Norway) Johanne Killi	

==== Big Air (BA) ====
Num	Season	Date	Place	Winner	Second	Third	Discipline leader	Ref.
20	1	21 October 2022	(Switzerland) Chur	(France) Tess Ledeux	(Norway) Sandra Eie	(Switzerland) Mathilde Gremaud	(France) Tess Ledeux	
		25 November 2022	(Sweden) Falun	cancelled				
21	2	16 December 2022	(United States) Copper Mountain	(Canada) Megan Oldham	(Switzerland) Mathilde Gremaud	(Canada) Olivia Asselin	(France) Tess Ledeux	
FIS Freestyle Ski and Snowboarding World Championships 2023 (19 February – 4 March)
World Championships		4 March 2023	(Georgia (country)) Bakuriani	(France) Tess Ledeux	(Norway) Sandra Eie	(Canada) Megan Oldham	not included in the World Cup	

=== Standings ===
==== Ski Cross ====
Rank	after all 12 events	Points
	(Sweden) Sandra Näslund	900
2	(Switzerland) Fanny Smith	691
3	(Canada) Marielle Thompson	664
4	(Austria) Katrin Ofner	440
5	(Canada) Hannah Schmidt	412

==== Ski Cross Alps Tour ====
Rank	after all 5 events	Points
1	(Sweden) Sandra Näslund	500
2	(Canada) Marielle Thompson	269
3	(Switzerland) Fanny Smith	260
4	(Switzerland) Talina Gantenbein	217
5	(Germany) Daniela Maier	209

==== Overall Moguls ====
Rank	after all 12 events	Points
	(France) Perrine Laffont	950
2	(Australia) Jakara Anthony	709
3	(Japan) Anri Kawamura	673
4	(United States) Jaelin Kauf	653
5	(United States) Elizabeth Lemley	470

==== Moguls ====
Rank	after all 6 events	Points
	(Australia) Jakara Anthony	480
2	(France) Perrine Laffont	430
3	(United States) Jaelin Kauf	341
4	(Japan) Anri Kawamura	293
5	(Japan) Rino Yanagimoto	223

==== Dual Moguls ====
Rank	after all 6 events	Points
	(France) Perrine Laffont	520
2	(Japan) Anri Kawamura	380
3	(United States) Jaelin Kauf	312
4	(United States) Elizabeth Lemley	280
5	(United States) Olivia Giaccio	258

==== Aerials ====
Rank	after all 6 events	Points
	(Australia) Danielle Scott	462
2	(Australia) Laura Peel	362
3	(Canada) Marion Thénault	350
4	(United States) Kaila Khun	254
5	(United States) Winter Vinecki	233

==== Park & Pipe Overall (HP/SS/BA) ====
Rank	after all 11 events	Points
	(Norway) Johanne Killi	440
2	(France) Tess Ledeux	345
3	(Switzerland) Sarah Höfflin	340
4	(Switzerland) Mathilde Gremaud	337
5	(Canada) Rachael Karker	320

==== Halfpipe ====
Rank	after all 4 events	Points
	(Canada) Rachael Karker	320
2	(Canada) Amy Fraser	216
3	(China) Zhang Kexin	205
4	(China) Eileen Gu	200
5	(United States) Hanna Faulhaber	195

==== Slopestyle ====
Rank	after all 5 events	Points
	(Norway) Johanne Killi	380
2	(Switzerland) Sarah Höfflin	250
3	(France) Tess Ledeux	205
4	(Switzerland) Mathilde Gremaud	197
5	(Canada) Megan Oldham	187

==== Big Air ====
Rank	after all 2 events	Points
	(France) Tess Ledeux	140
2	(Switzerland) Mathilde Gremaud	140
3	(Canada) Megan Oldham	132
4	(Norway) Sandra Eie	112
5	(Canada) Olivia Asselin	110

== Team ==
=== Ski Cross Team (SXT) ===
Num	Season	Date	Place	Winner	Second	Third	Discipline leader	Ref.
FIS Freestyle Ski and Snowboarding World Championships 2023 (19 February – 4 March)
World Championships		26 February 2023	(Georgia (country)) Bakuriani	Sweden David Mobärg; Sandra Näslund	Canada Reece Howden; Marielle Thompson	Italy Federico Tomasoni; Jole Galli	not included in the World Cup	

=== Team Aerials (AET) ===
Num	Season	Date	Place	Winner	Second	Third	Discipline leader	Ref.
FIS Freestyle Ski and Snowboarding World Championships 2023 (19 February – 4 March)
World Championships		19 February 2023	(Georgia (country)) Bakuriani	United States Ashley Caldwell; Christopher Lillis; Quinn Dehlinger	China Kong Fanyu; Li Tianma; Yang Longxiao	Ukraine Anastasiya Novosad; Oleksandr Okipniuk; Dmytro Kotovskyi	not included in the World Cup	
		20 March 2023	(Kazakhstan) Almaty	cancelled				

== Nations Cup ==
=== Overall ===
Rank	after all 82 events	Points
	Canada	7324
2	United States	5564
3	Switzerland	4134
4	France	4004
5	Sweden	3527

== Podium table by nation ==
Table showing the World Cup podium places (gold–1st place, silver–2nd place, bronze–3rd place) by the countries represented by the athletes.

Rank	Nation	Gold	Silver	Bronze	Total
1	Sweden	14	5	6	25
2	Canada	13	24	17	54
3	Australia	10	4	4	18
4	Switzerland	8	10	8	26
5	France	8	10	7	25
6	Norway	8	3	4	15
7	United States	6	9	15	30
8	Japan	6	5	3	14
9	Austria	3	3	1	7
10	China	3	1	4	8
11	Ukraine	2	1	3	6
12	Finland	1	0	0	1
13	Great Britain	0	3	1	4
14	Germany	0	2	6	8
15	Estonia	0	1	1	2
15	Kazakhstan	0	1	1	2
17	Italy	0	0	1	1
17	New Zealand	0	0	1	1
Totals (18 entries)		82	82	83	247
