= FIS Freestyle Ski and Snowboarding World Championships 2023 – Men's ski cross =

Men's ski cross at the FIS Freestyle Ski and Snowboarding World Championships 2023
- Location: Bakuriani, Georgia
- Dates: 24 February (qualification); 26 February
- Competitors: 40 from 14 nations

Medalists
gold medal	Simone Deromedis	Italy
silver medal	Florian Wilmsmann	Germany
bronze medal	Erik Mobärg	Sweden

The Men's ski cross competition at the FIS Freestyle Ski and Snowboarding World Championships 2023 was held on 24 and 26 February 2023.

== Qualification ==
The qualification was held on 24 February.

Rank	Bib	Name	Country	Time	Notes
1	31	Satoshi Furuno	Japan	1:20.31	Q
2	14	David Mobärg	Sweden	1:20.39	Q
3	20	Jared Schmidt	Canada	1:20.44	Q
4	10	Simone Deromedis	Italy	1:20.47	Q
5	21	Dominik Zuech	Italy	1:20.55	Q
6	9	Florian Wilmsmann	Germany	1:20.60	Q
7	2	Bastien Midol	France	1:20.66	Q
8	22	Federico Tomasoni	Italy	1:20.74	Q
9	18	Tristan Takats	Austria	1:20.88	Q
10	28	Robert Winkler	Austria	1:21.01	Q
11	17	Joos Berry	Switzerland	1:21.23	Q
12	24	Johannes Aujeski	Austria	1:21.31	Q
13	7	Oliver Davies	Great Britain	1:21.31	Q
14	15	Erik Mobärg	Sweden	1:21.34	Q
15	11	Youri Duplessis Kergomard	France	1:21.35	Q
16	6	Tim Hronek	Germany	1:21.43	Q
17	5	Reece Howden	Canada	1:21.43	Q
18	8	Jonas Lenherr	Switzerland	1:21.47	Q
19	27	Morgan Guipponi Barfety	France	1:21.50	Q
20	26	Christopher Del Bosco	United States	1:21.50	Q
21	13	Ryo Sugai	Japan	1:21.50	Q
22	12	Niklas Bachsleitner	Germany	1:21.62	Q
23	4	Marc Bischofberger	Switzerland	1:21.63	Q
24	23	Daniel Bohnacker	Germany	1:21.84	Q
25	30	Jonathan Midol	France	1:25.38	Q
26	29	Edoardo Zorzi	Italy	1:22.14	Q
27	32	Ryuto Kobayashi	Japan	1:22.56	Q
28	34	Fredrik Nilsson	Sweden	1:22.79	Q
29	16	Kevin Drury	United States	1:23.01	Q
30	3	Mathias Graf	Austria	1:23.07	Q
31	1	Brady Leman	Canada	1:23.10	Q
32	36	Davit Tediashvili	Georgia	1:23.32	Q
33	37	Daniel Paulus	Czech Republic	1:23.33	
34	19	Tyler Wallasch	United States	1:23.92	
35	33	Douglas Crawford	Australia	1:24.01	
36	35	Tetsuya Furuno	Japan	1:24.57	
37	39	Lasha Kurtanidze	Georgia	1:27.72	
38	40	Beka Berdzenishvili	Georgia	1:28.44	
39	38	Rokas Zaveckas	Lithuania	1:29.78	
	25	Elliott Baralo	Sweden	Did not finish	

== Elimination round ==
=== Round of 16 ===
Heat 1

Rank	Bib	Name	Country	Notes
1	17	Reece Howden	Canada	
2	1	Satoshi Furuno	Japan	
3	16	Tim Hronek	Germany	
	32	Davit Tediashvili	Georgia	DNF

Heat 3

Rank	Bib	Name	Country	Notes
1	14	Ryo Sugai	Japan	Q
2	11	Johannes Aujeski	Austria	Q
3	2	Fredrik Nilsson	Sweden	
4	6	Dominik Zuech	Italy	

Heat 5

Rank	Bib	Name	Country	Notes
1	14	Erik Mobärg	Sweden	Q
	30	Mathias Graf	Austria	DNF, Q
	3	Jared Schmidt	Canada	DNF
	19	Morgan Guipponi Barfety	France	DNF

Heat 7

Rank	Bib	Name	Country	Notes
1	7	Bastien Midol	France	Q
2	23	Marc Bischofberger	Switzerland	Q
3	10	Robert Winkler	Austria	
4	26	Edoardo Zorzi	Italy	

Heat 2

Rank	Bib	Name	Country	Notes
1	8	Federico Tomasoni	Italy	Q
2	9	Tristan Takats	Austria	Q
3	25	Jonathan Midol	France	
4	24	Daniel Bohnacker	Germany	

Heat 4

Rank	Bib	Name	Country	Notes
1	29	Kevin Drury	United States	Q
2	4	Simone Deromedis	Italy	Q
3	20	Christopher Del Bosco	United States	
4	13	Oliver Davies	Great Britain	

Heat 6

Rank	Bib	Name	Country	Notes
1	11	Joos Berry	Switzerland	Q
2	6	Florian Wilmsmann	Germany	Q
3	27	Ryuto Kobayashi	Japan	
	22	Niklas Bachsleitner	Germany	DNF

Heat 8

Rank	Bib	Name	Country	Notes
1	18	Jonas Lenherr	Switzerland	Q
2	31	Brady Leman	Canada	Q
3	15	Youri Duplessis Kergomard	France	
4	2	David Mobärg	Sweden	

=== Quarterfinals ===
Heat 1

Rank	Bib	Name	Country	Notes
1	17	Reece Howden	Canada	Q
2	8	Federico Tomasoni	Italy	Q
3	1	Satoshi Furuno	Japan	
4	9	Tristan Takats	Austria	

Heat 3

Rank	Bib	Name	Country	Notes
1	14	Erik Mobärg	Sweden	Q
2	6	Florian Wilmsmann	Germany	Q
3	30	Mathias Graf	Austria	
4	11	Joos Berry	Switzerland	

Heat 2

Rank	Bib	Name	Country	Notes
1	4	Simone Deromedis	Italy	Q
2	29	Kevin Drury	Canada	Q
3	21	Ryo Sugai	Japan	
4	12	Johannes Aujeski	Austria	

Heat 4

Rank	Bib	Name	Country	Notes
1	31	Brady Leman	Canada	Q
2	7	Bastien Midol	France	Q
3	18	Jonas Lenherr	Switzerland	
4	23	Marc Bischofberger	Switzerland	

=== Semifinals ===
Heat 1

Rank	Bib	Name	Country	Notes
1	17	Reece Howden	Canada	Q
2	4	Simone Deromedis	Italy	Q
3	29	Kevin Drury	Canada	
4	8	Federico Tomasoni	Italy	

Heat 2

Rank	Bib	Name	Country	Notes
1	6	Florian Wilmsmann	Germany	Q
2	14	Erik Mobärg	Sweden	Q
3	31	Brady Leman	Canada	
4	7	Bastien Midol	France	

=== Finals ===
==== Small final ====
Rank	Bib	Name	Country	Notes
5	29	Kevin Drury	Canada	
6	8	Federico Tomasoni	Italy	
7	31	Brady Leman	Canada	
8	7	Bastien Midol	France	

==== Big final ====
Rank	Bib	Name	Country	Notes
1st place, gold medalist(s)	4	Simone Deromedis	Italy	
2nd place, silver medalist(s)	6	Florian Wilmsmann	Germany	
3rd place, bronze medalist(s)	14	Erik Mobärg	Sweden	
4	17	Reece Howden	Canada	
