= 2021–22 FIS Freestyle Ski World Cup =

Freestyle skiing competitive season

Discipline	Men	Women
Ski Cross	(Switzerland) Ryan Regez (1)	(Sweden) Sandra Näslund (3)
Overall Moguls	(Canada) Mikaël Kingsbury (10)	(Australia) Jakara Anthony (1)
Moguls	(Canada) Mikaël Kingsbury (1)	(France) Perrine Laffont (1)
Dual Moguls	(Canada) Mikaël Kingsbury (1)	(Australia) Jakara Anthony (1)
Aerials	(Russia) Maxim Burov (3)	(China) Xu Mengtao (6)
Park & Pipe overall	(Norway) Birk Ruud (1)	(China) Eileen Gu (1)
Halfpipe	(Canada) Brendan Mackay (1)	(China) Eileen Gu (1)
Slopestyle	(Switzerland) Andri Ragettli (4)	(Estonia) Kelly Sildaru (1)
Big Air	(Austria) Matěj Švancer (1)	(France) Tess Ledeux (1)
- Nations Cup overall: Canada (13)

Competition
Locations	30 venues	30 venues
Individual	50 events	50 events
Team	4	4

The 2021–22 FIS Freestyle Ski World Cup was the 50th World Cup season in freestyle skiing competitions organised by the International Ski Federation. The season started on 22 October 2021 and finished on 26 March 2022 and included six disciplines: moguls, aerials, ski cross, halfpipe, slopestyle and big air.

On 1 March 2022, following the 2022 Russian invasion of Ukraine, FIS decided to exclude athletes from Russia and Belarus from all FIS competitions, with an immediate effect.

== Men ==
=== Ski Cross ===
Num	Season	Date	Place	Event	Winner	Second	Third
179	1	27 November 2021	(China) Secret Garden	SX	(Russia) Sergey Ridzik	(Canada) Brady Leman	(France) Bastien Midol
180	2	11 December 2021	(France) Val Thorens	SX	(France) Terence Tchiknavorian	(France) Bastien Midol	(Germany) Florian Wilmsmann
181	3	12 December 2021	(France) Val Thorens	SX	(Switzerland) Alex Fiva	(France) Terence Tchiknavorian	(Italy) Simone Deromedis
182	4	14 December 2021	(Switzerland) Arosa	SX	(Sweden) David Mobärg	(France) Terence Tchiknavorian	(Canada) Jared Schmidt
183	5	19 December 2021	(Italy) Innichen	SX	(Switzerland) Ryan Regez	(France) Bastien Midol	(Canada) Reece Howden
184	6	20 December 2021	(Italy) Innichen	SX	(France) Bastien Midol	(Switzerland) Ryan Regez	(Switzerland) Tobias Baur
6th Cross Alps Tour Overall (11–20 December 2021)					(France) Terence Tchiknavorian	(France) Bastien Midol	(Switzerland) Ryan Regez
185	7	14 January 2022	(Canada) Nakiska	SX	(Sweden) David Mobärg	(Canada) Kevin Drury	(Germany) Tobias Müller
186	8	15 January 2022	(Canada) Nakiska	SX	(Canada) Kristofor Mahler	(Germany) Florian Wilmsmann	(Switzerland) Ryan Regez
187	9	22 January 2022	(Sweden) Idre	SX	(Switzerland) Ryan Regez	(France) Terence Tchiknavorian	(Austria) Adam Kappacher
188	10	23 January 2022	(Sweden) Idre	SX	(Switzerland) Ryan Regez	(Sweden) David Mobärg	(France) François Place
189	11	13 March 2022	(Austria) Reiteralm	SX	(Canada) Reece Howden	(Japan) Ryo Sugai	(Switzerland) Alex Fiva
190	12	19 March 2022	(Switzerland) Veysonnaz	SX	(Sweden) David Mobärg	(Italy) Simone Deromedis	(Canada) Brady Leman

=== Moguls ===
Num	Season	Date	Place	Event	Winner	Second	Third
349	1	4 December 2021	(Finland) Ruka	MO	(Canada) Mikaël Kingsbury	(Kazakhstan) Pavel Kolmakov	(Japan) Ikuma Horishima
350	2	11 December 2021	(Sweden) Idre	MO	(Japan) Ikuma Horishima	(Sweden) Albin Holmgren	(France) Benjamin Cavet
351	3	17 December 2021	(France) Alpe d'Huez	MO	(Japan) Ikuma Horishima	(Japan) Daichi Hara	(Canada) Mikaël Kingsbury
352	4	7 January 2022	(Canada) Mont-Tremblant	MO	(Canada) Mikaël Kingsbury	(Sweden) Walter Wallberg	(Japan) Ikuma Horishima
353	5	8 January 2022	(Canada) Mont-Tremblant	MO	(Canada) Mikaël Kingsbury	(Sweden) Walter Wallberg	(Japan) Ikuma Horishima
354	6	13 January 2022	(United States) Deer Valley	MO	(Canada) Mikaël Kingsbury	(Japan) Ikuma Horishima	(Japan) Kosuke Sugimoto
355	7	14 January 2022	(United States) Deer Valley	MO	(Japan) Ikuma Horishima	(Canada) Mikaël Kingsbury	(Sweden) Walter Wallberg
356	8	18 March 2022	(France) Megève	MO	(Canada) Mikaël Kingsbury	(Japan) Ikuma Horishima	(Sweden) Walter Wallberg

=== Dual Moguls ===
Num	Season	Date	Place	Event	Winner	Second	Third
78	1	12 December 2021	(Sweden) Idre	DM	(Canada) Mikaël Kingsbury	(Japan) Ikuma Horishima	(Sweden) Ludvig Fjällström
79	2	18 December 2021	(France) Alpe d'Huez	DM	(Canada) Mikaël Kingsbury	(Sweden) Walter Wallberg	(Japan) Ikuma Horishima
80	3	12 March 2022	(Italy) Chiesa in Valmalenco	DM	(Canada) Mikaël Kingsbury	(Japan) Ikuma Horishima	(Sweden) Walter Wallberg
81	4	19 March 2022	(France) Megève	DM	(Canada) Mikaël Kingsbury	(Japan) Ikuma Horishima	(Sweden) Ludvig Fjällström

=== Aerials ===
Num	Season	Date	Place	Event	Winner	Second	Third
350	1	2 December 2021	(Finland) Ruka	AE	(Russia) Maxim Burov	(Switzerland) Pirmin Werner	(Switzerland) Noé Roth
351	2	3 December 2021	(Finland) Ruka	AE	(Russia) Maxim Burov	(China) Jia Zongyang	(Switzerland) Noé Roth
352	3	10 December 2021	(Finland) Ruka	AE	(Russia) Maxim Burov	(China) Jia Zongyang	(China) Qi Guangpu
353	4	11 December 2021	(Finland) Ruka	AE	(Russia) Maxim Burov	(Switzerland) Noé Roth	(Switzerland) Pirmin Werner
354	5	5 January 2022	(Canada) Le Relais	AE	(China) Sun Jiaxu	(China) Yang Longxiao	(Switzerland) Nicolas Gygax
355	6	12 January 2022	(United States) Deer Valley	AE	(China) Wang Xindi	(China) Yang Longxiao	(China) Sun Jiaxu

=== Halfpipe ===
Num	Season	Date	Place	Event	Winner	Second	Third
54	1	10 December 2021	(United States) Copper Mountain	HP	(United States) Alex Ferreira	(New Zealand) Nico Porteous	(Canada) Brendan Mackay
55	2	30 December 2021	(Canada) Calgary	HP	(Canada) Brendan Mackay	(United States) Alex Ferreira	(Canada) Simon d'Artois
56	3	1 January 2022	(Canada) Calgary	HP	(Canada) Brendan Mackay	(United States) Alex Ferreira	(Canada) Noah Bowman
57	4	8 January 2022	(United States) Mammoth	HP	(New Zealand) Nico Porteous	(United States) David Wise	(United States) Aaron Blunck

=== Slopestyle ===
Num	Season	Date	Place	Event	Winner	Second	Third
42	1	20 November 2021	(Austria) Stubai	SS	(Norway) Birk Ruud	(Canada) Max Moffatt	(Norway) Ferdinand Dahl
43	2	9 January 2022	(United States) Mammoth	SS	(United States) Alex Hall	(United States) Nick Goepper	(Canada) Evan McEachran
44	3	16 January 2022	(France) Font Romeu	SS	(Switzerland) Andri Ragettli	(New Zealand) Ben Barclay	(Canada) Édouard Therriault
45	4	5 March 2022	(Georgia (country)) Bakuriani	SS	(Switzerland) Andri Ragettli	(Switzerland) Colin Wili	(Switzerland) Thierry Wili
46	5	12 March 2022	(France) Tignes	SS	(Norway) Birk Ruud	(Canada) Max Moffatt	(Sweden) Jesper Tjäder
47	6	26 March 2022	(Switzerland) Silvaplana	SS	(Norway) Birk Ruud	(United States) Mac Forehand	(Switzerland) Andri Ragettli

=== Big Air ===
Num	Season	Date	Place	Event	Winner	Second	Third
18	1	22 October 2021	(Switzerland) Chur	BA	(Austria) Matěj Švancer	(Canada) Teal Harle	(Norway) Birk Ruud
19	2	4 December 2021	(United States) Steamboat	BA	(Austria) Matěj Švancer	(United States) Alex Hall	(France) Antoine Adelisse

== Women ==
=== Ski Cross ===
Num	Season	Date	Place	Event	Winner	Second	Third
179	1	27 November 2021	(China) Secret Garden	SX	(Sweden) Sandra Näslund	(Switzerland) Fanny Smith	(France) Marielle Berger Sabbatel
180	2	11 December 2021	(France) Val Thorens	SX	(Sweden) Sandra Näslund	(Canada) Brittany Phelan	(France) Marielle Berger Sabbatel
181	3	12 December 2021	(France) Val Thorens	SX	(Sweden) Sandra Näslund	(Switzerland) Fanny Smith	(Canada) Marielle Thompson
182	4	14 December 2021	(Switzerland) Arosa	SX	(Canada) Marielle Thompson	(Switzerland) Fanny Smith	(Canada) Zoe Chore
183	5	19 December 2021	(Italy) Innichen	SX	(Sweden) Sandra Näslund	(Switzerland) Fanny Smith	(Canada) Brittany Phelan
184	6	20 December 2021	(Italy) Innichen	SX	(Sweden) Sandra Näslund	(Switzerland) Fanny Smith	(Canada) Marielle Thompson
6th Cross Alps Tour Overall (11–20 December 2021)					(Sweden) Sandra Näslund	(Switzerland) Fanny Smith	(Canada) Marielle Thompson
185	7	14 January 2022	(Canada) Nakiska	SX	(Sweden) Sandra Näslund	(Switzerland) Fanny Smith	(Germany) Daniela Maier
186	8	15 January 2022	(Canada) Nakiska	SX	(Sweden) Sandra Näslund	(Canada) Marielle Thompson	(Switzerland) Fanny Smith
187	9	22 January 2022	(Sweden) Idre	SX	(Sweden) Sandra Näslund	(Sweden) Alexandra Edebo	(France) Jade Grillet-Aubert
188	10	23 January 2022	(Sweden) Idre	SX	(Sweden) Sandra Näslund	(France) Jade Grillet-Aubert	(Austria) Katrin Ofner
189	11	13 March 2022	(Austria) Reiteralm	SX	(Sweden) Sandra Näslund	(Canada) Marielle Thompson	(Canada) Brittany Phelan
190	12	19 March 2022	(Switzerland) Veysonnaz	SX	(Sweden) Sandra Näslund	(Canada) Marielle Thompson	(Switzerland) Fanny Smith

=== Moguls ===
Num	Season	Date	Place	Event	Winner	Second	Third
349	1	4 December 2021	(Finland) Ruka	MO	(United States) Olivia Giaccio	(Australia) Jakara Anthony	(United States) Kai Owens
350	2	11 December 2021	(Sweden) Idre	MO	(Japan) Anri Kawamura	(France) Perrine Laffont	(Australia) Jakara Anthony
351	3	17 December 2021	(France) Alpe d'Huez	MO	(Australia) Jakara Anthony	(Japan) Anri Kawamura	(United States) Tess Johnson
352	4	7 January 2022	(Canada) Mont-Tremblant	MO	(Japan) Anri Kawamura	(France) Perrine Laffont	(United States) Tess Johnson
353	5	8 January 2022	(Canada) Mont-Tremblant	MO	(France) Perrine Laffont	(Australia) Jakara Anthony	(Japan) Anri Kawamura
354	6	13 January 2022	(United States) Deer Valley	MO	(France) Perrine Laffont	(Japan) Anri Kawamura	(Australia) Jakara Anthony
355	7	14 January 2022	(United States) Deer Valley	MO	(Japan) Anri Kawamura	(Australia) Jakara Anthony	(France) Perrine Laffont
356	8	18 March 2022	(France) Megève	MO	(France) Perrine Laffont	(Australia) Jakara Anthony	(Japan) Anri Kawamura

=== Dual Moguls ===
Num	Season	Date	Place	Event	Winner	Second	Third
77	1	12 December 2021	(Sweden) Idre	DM	(France) Perrine Laffont	(Japan) Rino Yanagimoto	(Australia) Jakara Anthony
78	2	18 December 2021	(France) Alpe d'Huez	DM	(Australia) Jakara Anthony	(Russia) Anastasia Smirnova	(United States) Kai Owens
79	3	12 March 2022	(Italy) Chiesa in Valmalenco	DM	(Australia) Jakara Anthony	(France) Perrine Laffont	(United States) Jaelin Kauf
80	4	19 March 2022	(France) Megève	DM	(France) Perrine Laffont	(Australia) Jakara Anthony	(United States) Jaelin Kauf

=== Aerials ===
Num	Season	Date	Place	Event	Winner	Second	Third
350	1	2 December 2021	(Finland) Ruka	AE	(China) Kong Fanyu	(Kazakhstan) Zhanbota Aldabergenova (China) Qi Shao	
351	2	3 December 2021	(Finland) Ruka	AE	(China) Xu Mengtao	(China) Kong Fanyu	(Belarus) Hanna Huskova
352	3	10 December 2021	(Finland) Ruka	AE	(Ukraine) Anastasiya Novosad	(China) Xu Mengtao	(Ukraine) Olga Polyuk
353	4	11 December 2021	(Finland) Ruka	AE	(Australia) Danielle Scott	(Australia) Laura Peel	(China) Xu Mengtao
354	5	5 January 2022	(Canada) Le Relais	AE	(China) Xu Mengtao	(Canada) Marion Thénault	(China) Kong Fanyu
355	6	12 January 2022	(United States) Deer Valley	AE	(Australia) Laura Peel	(China) Kong Fanyu	(Belarus) Hanna Huskova

=== Halfpipe ===
Num	Season	Date	Place	Event	Winner	Second	Third
54	1	10 December 2021	(United States) Copper Mountain	HP	(China) Eileen Gu	(Canada) Rachael Karker	(Estonia) Kelly Sildaru
55	2	30 December 2021	(Canada) Calgary	HP	(China) Eileen Gu	(United States) Hanna Faulhaber	(Canada) Rachael Karker
56	3	1 January 2022	(Canada) Calgary	HP	(China) Eileen Gu	(Canada) Rachael Karker	(United States) Hanna Faulhaber
57	4	8 January 2022	(United States) Mammoth	HP	(China) Eileen Gu	(Estonia) Kelly Sildaru	(United States) Brita Sigourney

=== Slopestyle ===
Num	Season	Date	Place	Event	Winner	Second	Third
42	1	20 November 2021	(Austria) Stubai	SS	(Estonia) Kelly Sildaru	(Switzerland) Sarah Höfflin	(Norway) Johanne Killi
43	2	9 January 2022	(United States) Mammoth	SS	(Estonia) Kelly Sildaru	(China) Eileen Gu	(United States) Maggie Voisin
44	3	16 January 2022	(France) Font Romeu	SS	(France) Tess Ledeux	(United States) Marin Hamill	(Austria) Lara Wolf
45	4	5 March 2022	(Georgia (country)) Bakuriani	SS	(Canada) Megan Oldham	(Switzerland) Sarah Höfflin	(Germany) Alia Delia Eichinger
46	5	26 March 2022	(Switzerland) Silvaplana	SS	(Estonia) Kelly Sildaru	(France) Tess Ledeux	(Norway) Johanne Killi

=== Big Air ===
Num	Season	Date	Place	Event	Winner	Second	Third
18	1	22 October 2021	(Switzerland) Chur	BA	(France) Tess Ledeux	(Switzerland) Sarah Höfflin	(Canada) Elena Gaskell
19	2	4 December 2021	(United States) Steamboat	BA	(China) Eileen Gu	(France) Tess Ledeux	(Norway) Johanne Killi

== Team ==
=== Ski Cross Team ===
Num	Season	Date	Place	Event	Winner	Second	Third
	1	15 December 2021	(Switzerland) Arosa	SXT	Sweden I David Mobärg; Sandra Näslund	Canada III Reece Howden; Zoe Chore	Russia I Sergey Ridzik; Natalia Sherina

=== Team Aerials ===
Num	Season	Date	Place	Event	Winner	Second	Third
343	1	3 December 2021	(Finland) Ruka	AET	China Xu Mengtao; Jia Zongyang; Qi Guangpu	Russia Liubov Nikitina; Stanislav Nikitin; Maxim Burov	Ukraine Anastasiya Novosad; Dmytro Kotovskyi; Oleksandr Abramenko
344	2	11 December 2021	(Finland) Ruka	AET	China Xu Mengtao; Sun Jiaxu; Qi Guangpu	United States Winter Vinecki; Christopher Lillis; Justin Schoenefeld	Ukraine Anastasiya Novosad; Dmytro Kotovskyi; Oleksandr Abramenko

== Men's standings ==
=== Ski Cross ===
Rank	after all 12 races	Points
1	(Switzerland) Ryan Regez	559
2	(France) Terence Tchiknavorian	506
3	(France) Bastien Midol	465
4	(Sweden) David Mobärg	430
5	(Germany) Florian Wilmsmann	345

=== Ski Cross Alps Tour ===
Rank	after all 5 races	Points
1	(France) Terence Tchiknavorian	302
2	(France) Bastien Midol	297
3	(Switzerland) Ryan Regez	206
4	(Italy) Simone Deromedis	166
5	(Austria) Tristan Takats	155

=== Overall Moguls ===
Rank	after all 12 races	Points
1	(Canada) Mikaël Kingsbury	1072
2	(Japan) Ikuma Horishima	940
3	(Sweden) Walter Wallberg	613
4	(Sweden) Ludvig Fjällström	461
5	(Japan) Kosuke Sugimoto	424

=== Moguls ===
Rank	after all 8 races	Points
1	(Canada) Mikaël Kingsbury	672
2	(Japan) Ikuma Horishima	640
3	(Sweden) Walter Wallberg	405
4	(Japan) Kosuke Sugimoto	328
5	(Sweden) Ludvig Fjällström	259

=== Dual Moguls ===
Rank	after all 4 races	Points
1	(Canada) Mikaël Kingsbury	400
2	(Japan) Ikuma Horishima	300
3	(Sweden) Walter Wallberg	208
4	(Sweden) Ludvig Fjällström	202
5	(United States) Cole McDonald	133

=== Aerials ===
Rank	after all 6 events	Points
1	(Russia) Maxim Burov	400
2	(China) Sun Jiaxu	266
3	(China) Jia Zongyang	251
4	(China) Yang Longxiao	224
5	(China) Qi Guangpu	218

=== Park & Pipe overall (HP/SS/BA) ===
Rank	after all 12 races	Points
1	(Norway) Birk Ruud	386
2	(Switzerland) Andri Ragettli	310
3	(United States) Alex Hall	273
4	(Canada) Brendan Mackay	260
5	(United States) Alex Ferreira	260

=== Halfpipe ===
Rank	after all 4 races	Points
1	(Canada) Brendan Mackay	260
2	(United States) Alex Ferreira	260
3	(New Zealand) Nico Porteous	180
4	(United States) David Wise	180
5	(Canada) Noah Bowman	150

=== Slopestyle ===
Rank	after all 6 races	Points
1	(Switzerland) Andri Ragettli	310
2	(Norway) Birk Ruud	300
3	(United States) Mac Forehand	194
4	(Canada) Max Moffatt	191
5	(United States) Alex Hall	153

=== Big Air ===
Rank	after all 2 races	Points
1	(Austria) Matěj Švancer	200
2	(United States) Alex Hall	120
3	(Norway) Birk Ruud	86
4	(France) Antoine Adelisse	84
5	(Canada) Teal Harle	80

== Women's standings ==
=== Ski Cross ===
Rank	after all 12 races	Points
1	(Sweden) Sandra Näslund	1150
2	(Switzerland) Fanny Smith	641
3	(Canada) Marielle Thompson	549
4	(Canada) Brittany Phelan	453
5	(France) Jade Grillet-Aubert	396

=== Ski Cross Alps Tour ===
Rank	after all 5 races	Points
1	(Sweden) Sandra Näslund	450
2	(Switzerland) Fanny Smith	346
3	(Canada) Marielle Thompson	289
4	(Canada) Brittany Phelan	256
5	(France) Marielle Berger Sabbatel	179

=== Overall Moguls ===
Rank	after all 12 races	Points
1	(Australia) Jakara Anthony	925
2	(France) Perrine Laffont	906
3	(Japan) Anri Kawamura	704
4	(United States) Olivia Giaccio	448
5	(United States) Tess Johnson	427

=== Moguls ===
Rank	after all 8 races	Points
1	(France) Perrine Laffont	610
2	(Japan) Anri Kawamura	609
3	(Australia) Jakara Anthony	585
4	(United States) Olivia Giaccio	350
5	(United States) Tess Johnson	318

=== Dual Moguls ===
Rank	after all 4 races	Points
1	(Australia) Jakara Anthony	340
2	(France) Perrine Laffont	296
3	(United States) Kai Owens	200
4	(United States) Jaelin Kauf	192
5	(United States) Hannah Soar	128

=== Aerials ===
Rank	after all 6 events	Points
1	(China) Xu Mengtao	385
2	(China) Kong Fanyu	361
3	(Australia) Laura Peel	294
4	(Australia) Danielle Scott	280
5	(Ukraine) Anastasiya Novosad	229

=== Park & Pipe overall (HP/SS/BA) ===
Rank	after all 11 races	Points
1	(China) Eileen Gu	580
2	(Estonia) Kelly Sildaru	469
3	(France) Tess Ledeux	364
4	(Switzerland) Sarah Höfflin	309
5	(United States) Hanna Faulhaber	235

=== Halfpipe ===
Rank	after all 4 races	Points
1	(China) Eileen Gu	400
2	(United States) Hanna Faulhaber	235
3	(Canada) Rachael Karker	220
4	(China) Zhang Kexin	167
5	(China) Li Fanghui	142

=== Slopestyle ===
Rank	after all 5 races	Points
1	(Estonia) Kelly Sildaru	300
2	(Switzerland) Sarah Höfflin	189
3	(France) Tess Ledeux	184
4	(Canada) Megan Oldham	162
5	(United States) Marin Hamill	136

=== Big Air ===
Rank	after all 2 races	Points
1	(France) Tess Ledeux	180
2	(Switzerland) Sarah Höfflin	120
3	(Canada) Elena Gaskell	110
4	(China) Eileen Gu	100
5	(Norway) Johanne Killi	89

== Team ==
=== Team Aerials ===
Rank	after all 2 events	Points
1	China	200
2	Russia; United States	120
4	Ukraine	120
5	Belarus	100

=== Ski Cross Team ===
Rank	after all 1 race	Points
1	Sweden	100
2	Canada	80
3	Russia	60
4	Austria	50
5	Switzerland	36

== Nations Cup ==
=== Overall ===
Rank	after all 86 races	Points
1	Canada	6858
2	United States	4874
3	France	4323
4	Switzerland	4067
5	Sweden	3958
