= Mobärg =

Mobärg is a surname. Notable people with the surname include:

- David Mobärg (born 1999), Swedish freestyle skier
- Erik Mobärg (born 1997), Swedish freestyle skier
- Linnea Mobärg (born 2001), Swedish freestyle skier
