= FIS Ski Cross World Cup =

Freestyle skiing competition

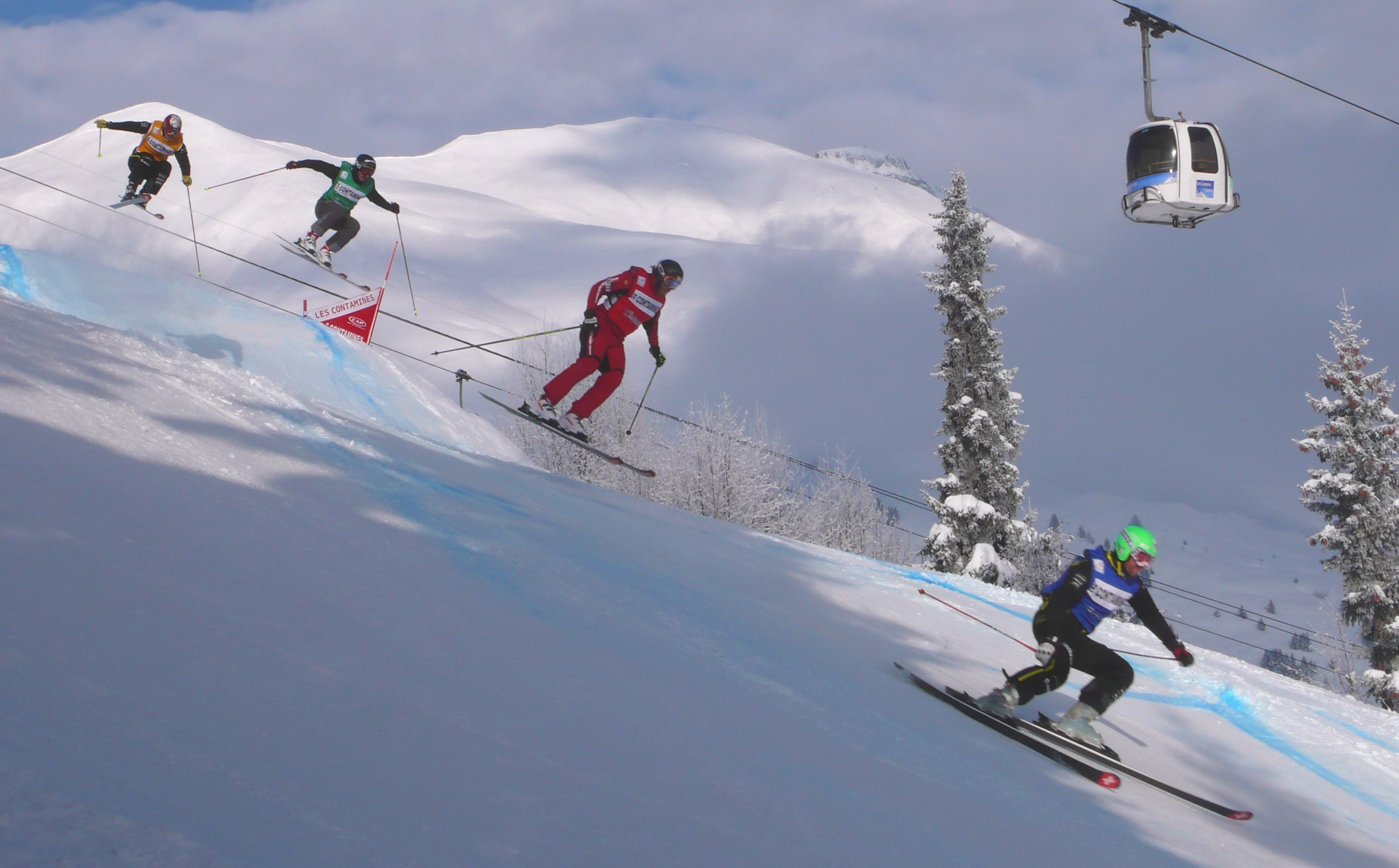
- January 2010 competitions in Les Contamines-Montjoie, France
- Status: active
- Genre: sports competition
- Date: November or December–March
- Frequency: annual
- Location: various
- Inaugurated: 2002
- Organiser: FIS

The FIS Ski Cross World Cup is an annual freestyle skiing competition, a subdiscipline of FIS Freestyle Skiing World Cup under International Ski Federation. Races are hosted primarily at ski resorts in North America and the Alps in Europe.

== Discipline title ==
=== Men ===
No.	Season	Winner	Second	Third
1	2002–03	(Switzerland) Patrick Schmid	(France) Enak Gavaggio	(Austria) Markus Wittner
2	2003–04	(Sweden) Jesper Brugge	(France) Enak Gavaggio (2)	(Austria) Roman Hofer
3	2004–05	(Czech Republic) Tomáš Kraus	(Austria) Isidor Grüner	(Czech Republic) Stanley Hayer
4	2005–06	(Czech Republic) Tomáš Kraus	(Austria) Roman Hofer	(France) Enak Gavaggio
5	2006–07	(Norway) Audun Grønvold	(Czech Republic) Tomáš Kraus	(Japan) Hiroomi Takizawa
6	2007–08	(Czech Republic) Tomáš Kraus	(Sweden) Lars Lewen	(Canada) Stanley Hayer
7	2008–09	(Czech Republic) Tomáš Kraus (4)	(Canada) Christopher Del Bosco	(Sweden) Lars Lewén
8	2009–10	(Switzerland) Michael Schmid	(Canada) Christopher Del Bosco	(Norway) Audun Grønvold
9	2010–11	(Austria) Andreas Matt	(Canada) Christopher Del Bosco	(Finland) Jouni Pellinen
10	2011–12	(Slovenia) Filip Flisar	(Canada) Brady Leman	(Switzerland) Alex Fiva
11	2012–13	(Switzerland) Alex Fiva	(Switzerland) Armin Niederer	(Sweden) Victor Öhling Norberg
12	2013–14	(Sweden) Victor Öhling Norberg	(Austria) Andreas Matt	(Germany) Daniel Bohnacker
13	2014–15	(France) Jean Frederic Chapuis	(Sweden) Victor Öhling Norberg	(France) Bastien Midol
14	2015–16	(France) Jean Frederic Chapuis	(Canada) Christopher Delbosco (4)	(Canada) Brady Leman
15	2016–17	(France) Jean Frederic Chapuis (3)	(Canada) Brady Leman	(Switzerland) Alex Fiva
16	2017–18	(Switzerland) Marc Bischofberger	(France) Jean Frederic Chapuis	(Canada) Kevin Drury
17	2018-19	(France) Bastien Midol	(France) Jean Frederic Chapuis (2)	(Switzerland) Alex Fiva
18	2019-20	(Canada) Kevin Drury	(Switzerland) Ryan Regez	(Canada) Brady Leman
19	2020-21	(Canada) Reece Howden	(Switzerland) Jonas Lenherr	(France) Bastien Midol
20	2021-22	(Switzerland) Ryan Regez	(France) Terence Tchiknavorian	(France) Bastien Midol (3)
21	2022-23	(Canada) Reece Howden (2)	(Sweden) David Mobärg	(Germany) Florian Wilmsmann
22	2023-24	(Sweden) David Mobärg	(Canada) Reece Howden	(Switzerland) Alex Fiva (4)
23	2024-25	(Canada) Reece Howden (3)	(Italy) Simone Deromedis	(Germany) Florian Wilmsmann (2)

=== Ladies ===
No.	Season	Winner	Second	Third
1	2002–03	(France) Valentine Scuotto	(Sweden) Magdalena Iljans	(Switzerland) Annick Staudenmann
2	2003–04	(France) Ophélie David	(Switzerland) Franziska Steffen	(Sweden) Magdalena Iljans
3	2004–05	(France) Ophélie David	(Austria) Karin Huttary	(Sweden) Magdalena Iljans
4	2005–06	(France) Ophélie David	(Austria) Karin Huttary (2)	(Sweden) Magdalena Iljans (3)
5	2006–07	(France) Ophélie David	(Sweden) Magdalena Iljans	(France) Méryll Boulangeat
6	2007–08	(France) Ophélie David	(Slovenia) Saša Farič	(France) Méryll Boulangeat (2)
7	2008–09	(France) Ophélie David	(Austria) Katharina Gutensohn	(Canada) Kelsey Serwa
8	2009–10	(France) Ophélie David (7)	(Canada) Ashleigh McIvor	(Sweden) Anna Holmlund
9	2010–11	(Sweden) Anna Holmlund	(Germany) Heidi Zacher	(Canada) Kelsey Serwa (2)
10	2011–12	(Canada) Marielle Thompson	(France) Ophélie David	(Switzerland) Katrin Müller
11	2012–13	(Switzerland) Fanny Smith	(France) Ophélie David (2)	(France) Marielle Berger Sabbatel
12	2013–14	(Canada) Marielle Thompson	(Switzerland) Fanny Smith	(France) Ophélie David
13	2014–15	(Sweden) Anna Holmlund	(France) Alizée Baron	(Switzerland) Fanny Smith
14	2015–16	(Sweden) Anna Holmlund (3)	(Canada) Marielle Thompson	(France) Alizée Baron
15	2016–17	(Canada) Marielle Thompson	(Sweden) Sandra Näslund	(Switzerland) Fanny Smith (2)
16	2017–18	(Sweden) Sandra Näslund	(Switzerland) Fanny Smith	(Canada) Brittany Phelan
17	2018-19	(Switzerland) Fanny Smith	(Sweden) Sandra Näslund (2)	(Canada) Marielle Thompson
18	2019-20	(Sweden) Sandra Näslund	(Switzerland) Fanny Smith	(Canada) Marielle Thompson
19	2020-21	(Switzerland) Fanny Smith (3)	(France) Alizée Baron (2)	(Canada) Marielle Thompson
20	2021-22	(Sweden) Sandra Näslund	(Switzerland) Fanny Smith	(Canada) Marielle Thompson
21	2022-23	(Sweden) Sandra Näslund (4)	(Switzerland) Fanny Smith (5)	(Canada) Marielle Thompson (5)
22	2023-24	(Canada) Marielle Thompson (4)	(France) Marielle Berger Sabbatel	(Canada) Brittany Phelan (2)
23	2024-25	(Switzerland) Fanny Smith (4)	(Germany) Daniela Maier	(Canada) India Sherret

== Wins ==
Statistics as of 12 March 2026.

=== Men ===
Rank	Name	Country	Wins
1	Reece Howden	Canada	24
2	Jean Frederic Chapuis	France	18
3	Tomáš Kraus	Czech Republic	15
4	Alex Fiva	Switzerland	14
5	David Mobärg	Sweden	11
6	Christopher Delbosco	Canada	10
7	Filip Flisar	Slovenia	7
7	Andreas Matt	Austria	7
7	Victor Öhling Norberg	Sweden	7
7	Ryan Regez	Switzerland	7
7	Simone Deromedis	Italy	7
12	Michael Schmid	Switzerland	6
12	Brady Leman	Canada	6
12	Kevin Drury	Canada	6
12	Florian Wilmsmann	Germany	6
16	Enak Gavaggio	France	5
16	Lars Lewén	Sweden	5
16	Bastien Midol	France	5
16	Jonas Lenherr	Switzerland	5

=== Ladies ===
Rank	Name	Country	Wins
1	Sandra Näslund	Sweden	47
2	Marielle Thompson	Canada	36
3	Fanny Smith	Switzerland	35
4	Ophélie David	France	26
5	Anna Holmlund	Sweden	19
6	Kelsey Serwa	Canada	8
7	Magdalena Iljans	Sweden	7
7	Heidi Zacher	Germany	7
9	Daniela Maier	Germany	6
10	Karin Huttary	Austria	4
10	Andrea Limbacher	Austria	4
10	Hannah Schmidt	Canada	4
13	Aleisha Cline	Canada	3
13	Marte Høie Gjefsen	Norway	3
13	Sanna Lüdi	Switzerland	3
13	Katrin Müller	Switzerland	3
13	Anna Wörner	Germany	3
13	India Sherret	Canada	3
13	Marielle Berger Sabbatel	France	3
13	Jole Galli	Italy	3

== Nations which have won World Cup races ==
The table below lists those nations which have won at least one World Cup race (as of February 28, 2026).

Nation	Total Victories		
Nation	Men	Ladies	Both
Canada	55	57	112
Sweden	28	74	102
Switzerland	45	43	88
France	43	34	77
Austria	17	11	28
Germany	12	16	28
Czech Republic	15	–	15
Italy	8	3	11
Slovenia	7	2	9
Norway	3	4	7
Japan	4	–	4
Russia	3	–	3
United States	3	–	3
Finland	2	–	2
Australia	1	–	1
Totals	235	233	468

== Scoring system ==
Place	1	2	3	4	5	6	7	8	9	10	11	12	13	14	15	16	17	18	19	20	21	22	23	24	25	26	27	28	29	30
Ski Cross	100	80	60	50	45	40	36	32	29	26	24	22	20	18	16	15	14	13	12	11	10	9	8	7	6	5	4	3	2	1
Freestyle Overall	20	16	12	10	9	8	7	6	6	5	5	4	4	4	3	3	3	3	2	2	2	2	2	1	1	1	1	1	0	0
