= Linnea Mobärg =

Swedish freestyle skier (born 2001)

Personal information
- Born: 22 June 2001 (age 25) Undersåker, Sweden

Sport
- Sport: Freestyle skiing
- Event: Ski cross
Medal record
Women's freestyle skiing
Representing Sweden
Junior World Championships
Silver medal – second place	2022 Veysonnaz	Ski cross

Linnea Mobärg (born 22 June 2001) is a Swedish freestyle skier specializing in ski cross. She represented Sweden at the 2026 Winter Olympics.

== Career ==
Mobärg competed at the 2022 FIS Freestyle Junior World Ski Championships and won a silver medal in the ski cross event.

In January 2026, she was selected to represent Sweden at the 2026 Winter Olympics.

== Personal life ==
Mobärg's older brothers Erik and David are also Olympic freestyle skiers.
