= David Mobärg =

Swedish freestyle skier (born 1999)

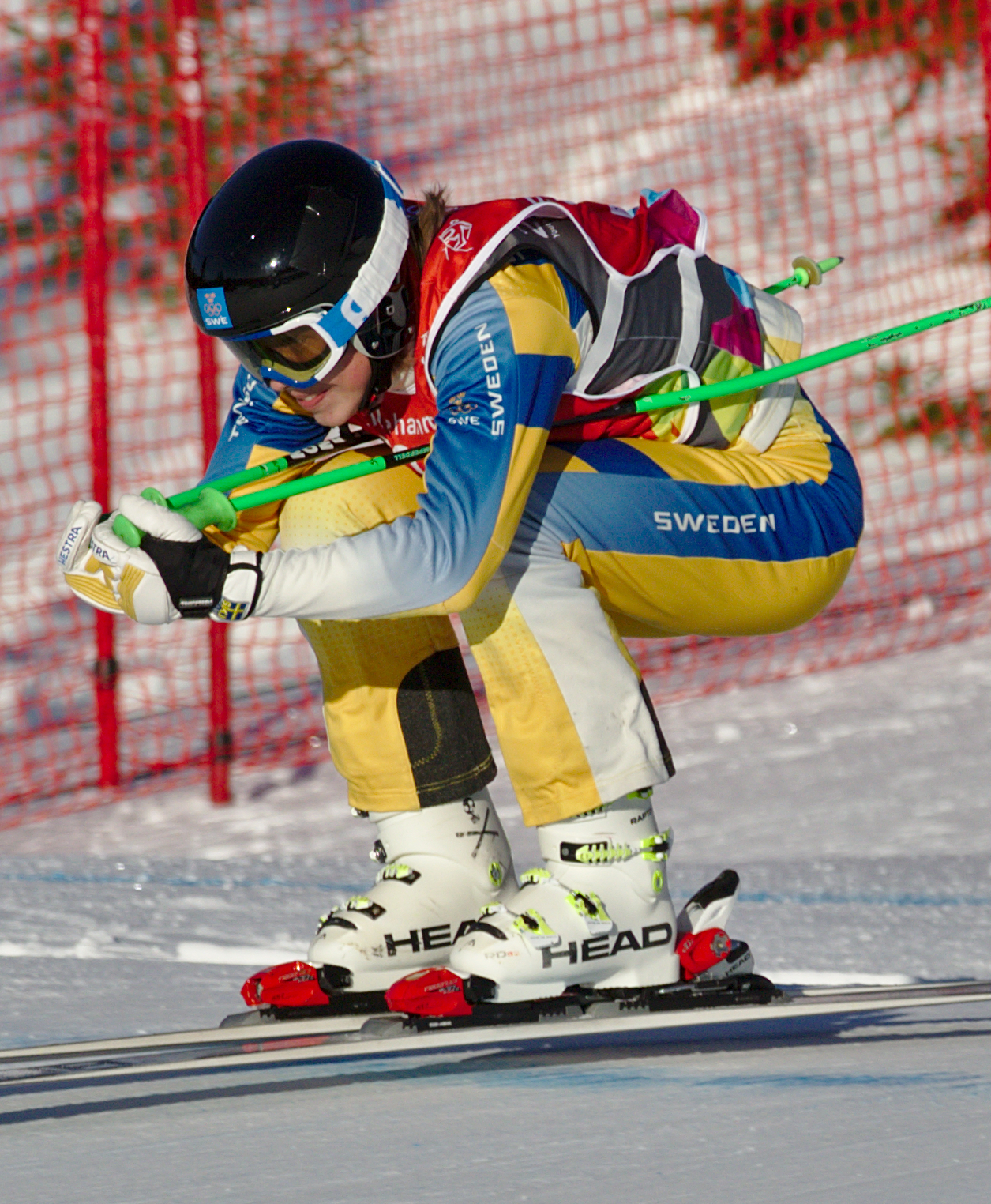
- Mobärg at the 2016 Winter Youth Olympics

Personal information
- Born: 17 May 1999 (age 27) Undersåker, Sweden

Sport
- Sport: Skiing

World Cup career
- Seasons: 7 – (2018–19–present)
- Indiv. starts: 47
- Indiv. podiums: 19
- Indiv. wins: 11
- Team starts: 2
- Team podiums: 2
- Team wins: 1
Medal record
Men's freestyle skiing
Representing Sweden
World Championships
Gold medal – first place	2023 Bakuriani	Mixed team ski cross
Junior World Championships
Gold medal – first place	2019 Reiteralm	Ski cross
Silver medal – second place	2016 Val Thorens	Ski cross
Winter Youth Olympics
Bronze medal – third place	2016 Lillehammer	Team snowboard ski cross
- Updated on 26 February 2023

David Mobärg (born 17 May 1999) is a Swedish freestyle skier who competed at the 2022 and 2026 Winter Olympics.

== Career ==
Mobärg represented Sweden at the 2022 Winter Olympics in the ski cross event. On 16 December 2025, he was again selected to represent Sweden at the 2026 Winter Olympics.

== Personal life ==
Mobärg's brother, Erik Mobärg, and sister, Linnea Mobärg, also compete in ski cross.

== World Cup results ==
Season
Season	Age	Overall	Ski cross	Cross; Alps Tour
2018–19	19	139	30	29
2019–20	20	97	18	37
2020–21	21	—N/a	5	2
2021–22	22	—N/a	4	12
2022–23	23	—N/a	2	
2023–24	24	—N/a	1	
2024–25	25	—N/a	6	

== World Championship results ==
Year
Year	Age	Ski cross	Team Ski cross
2019	19	10	
2021	21	13	
2023	23	25	1
2025	25	5	11

== Olympic results ==
Year
Year	Age	Ski cross
2022	22	19
2026	26	18
