= Tobias Müller (footballer, born 1989) =

Swiss footballer

Personal information
- Full name: Tobias Müller
- Date of birth: 7 May 1989 (age 37)
- Place of birth: Switzerland
- Height: 1.72 m (5 ft 7 1/2 in)
- Position: Midfielder

Team information
- Current team: FC Muri

Senior career*
Years	Team	Apps	(Gls)
2006–2011	FC Aarau	2	(0)
2007–2009	→ FC Wohlen (loan)	42	(2)
2011–	FC Muri	44	(8)
- * Club domestic league appearances and goals as of 1 February 2013

Tobias Müller (born 7 May 1989) is a footballer from Switzerland who plays midfielder role for FC Muri in the 1. Liga Classic. He has a side interest in random geometric graphs.

== Career ==
He was loaned to FC Wohlen of the Challenge League on 19 October 2007, and at the end of the season his loan was extended for another year.
