= Stanislav Nikitin =

Russian freestyle skier

Personal information
- Full name: Stanislav Igorevich Nikitin
- Nationality: Russian
- Born: 22 June 1995 (age 31) Yaroslavl, Russia
- Height: 1.75 m (5 ft 9 in)

Sport
- Country: Russia
- Sport: Freestyle skiing
- Event: Aerials
Medal record
Men's freestyle skiing
Representing Russia
World Championships
Bronze medal – third place	2019 Utah	Mixed team aerials
Winter Universiade
Silver medal – second place	2019 Krasnoyarsk	Mixed team aerials

Stanislav Igorevich Nikitin (Russian: Станислав Игоревич Никитин; born 22 June 1995) is a Russian freestyle skier. He competed in the 2018 Winter Olympics.

His sister Liubov Nikitina is also a freestyle skier.
