= Edoardo Zorzi =

Italian freestyle skier (born 1996)

Edoardo Zorzi (born 24 June 1996) is an Italian freestyle skier who specializes in the ski cross discipline.He has represented Italy in the FIS Freestyle Ski World Cup and the FIS Freestyle World Championships, competing as a member of the Italian national team.

== Early life ==
Zorzi was born in Songavazzo, in the Province of Bergamo, Italy. He joined the ski club SC Radici Group and developed his career in freestyle skiing before entering international competitions in ski cross.

== Career ==
Zorzi has competed in several editions of the FIS Freestyle World Championships, representing Italy in the ski cross event.

During his World Cup career, he regularly competed on the FIS Freestyle Ski World Cup circuit, gradually improving his results and establishing himself among the Italian ski cross team members preparing for major competitions including the 2026 Winter Olympics in Milan–Cortina.

In December 2025, Zorzi achieved the best result of his World Cup career by finishing second in the ski cross event at Val Thorens, France'. The race ended with a historic Italian one-two finish, with Simone Deromedis taking victory ahead of Zorzi, marking the first time two Italian athletes reached the big final together in the discipline’s World Cup history.

== Personal life ==
Outside professional skiing, Zorzi has worked as a gardener during the off-season while continuing to train for international competitions.
