= Anri Kawamura =

Japanese freestyle skier (born 2004)

Personal information
- Nationality: Japanese
- Born: 15 October 2004 (age 21)

Sport
- Country: Japan
- Sport: Freestyle skiing
- Event: Moguls

Anri Kawamura (born 15 October 2004) is a Japanese freestyle skier specializing in moguls. She started competing internationally in December 2019. Kawamura won three World Cup races in the 2021-22 season and qualified for the 2022 Winter Olympics. Kawamura was leading the moguls standings in the 2021–22 season at the start of the Olympics, after 7 of 8 races. As of mid-January 2022, at the age of 17, she achieved 10 podium finishes in 23 career starts. At the 2022 Olympics, she qualified for Final C (the medal round), but only finished fifth.

== Olympics results ==
Year	Age	Moguls
(China) 2022 Beijing	17	5
