= Erik Mobärg =

Swedish freestyle skier (born 1997)

Personal information
- Nationality: Swedish
- Born: 23 June 1997 (age 29) Undersåker, Sweden
- Height: 1.75 m (5 ft 9 in)

Sport
- Country: Sweden
- Sport: Freestyle skiing
- Event: Ski cross
- Club: Edsåsdalen SLK
Medal record
Men's freestyle skiing
Representing Sweden
World Championships
| Bronze medal – third place | 2021 Idre | Ski cross |
| Bronze medal – third place | 2023 Bakuriani | Ski cross |

Erik Mobärg (born 23 June 1997) is a Swedish freestyle skier who competes in ski cross. He represented Sweden at the 2018, 2022, and 2026 Winter Olympics.

== Early life ==
Erik was born in Undersåker at the foot of the mountain. With easy access to Åre and the big mountains, it was obvious that skiing would become a big part of his life. With a lot of snow each winter and ten pairs of skis/snowboards, the choice was easy. Before ski cross became a great part of Erik's life, he devoted himself to football, gymnastics, cross-country skiing, and alpine skiing.

Erik's younger brother, David, is also a ski cross athlete on the same level. Erik explains that they can push each other as they both train and compete with each other. Their little sister, Linnea, is also a freestyle skier competing in ski cross. Erik's parents have always been supportive of him.

== Professional career ==
Erik has been skiing his whole life but did not specify any special event until the age of 16 when he attended a Swedish ski high school (Åre Skidgymnasium). His experience playing football, gymnastics, cross country, free skiing, and jibbing as well as skateboarding and biking in the summer contributed to his skiing foundation.

Erik is competing for Edsåsdalens SLK as of 2016 and the European national team. Erik attends Åre High School, which is one of the most prestigious skiing high schools in Sweden.

The main motivator of Erik is to keep on growing in everything he does. He strives to be the best that he can possibly become. Skiing is something he loves to do, and the training allows him to become better and better at skiing.

== Training ==
In the Summer season, Erik trained 5 to 6 days a week. He usually does fitness in the morning with leg workouts and upper body workouts. He also works on balance, agility, and coordination to improve his skiing skills. Moreover, he rides mountain bikes, rows, and runs in the afternoon. In the Winter season, the schedule is different. In the morning, Erik skis with his teammates before going to school in the afternoon. After school, he improves his physical condition with strength and coordination training. He used to ski 4 to 6 days a week.

Erik tries to eat as little gluten and dairy as possible to stay in shape. He eats a lot of vegetables to stay healthy and give his body all the essential nutrients. For him, it is important to eat enough, and he tries to eat at least six meals a day.

Leg muscles are important to take advantage of everything in the path of the pumping speed to complete the whole way down. The torso and upper body are also important in the beginning when it is important to be fast.

== Injuries ==
Erik is aware of injuries associated with this industry. He says that he is not scared to get injured, but he conducts a lot of training to minimize the risk of injuries. He has been lucky because he has never had a long break from skiing due to serious injuries. His latest injury was a big concussion in the spring of 2016. This caused memory lapses. He couldn't tell which day, month, or year it was. However, he recovered quickly and was back on skis after three weeks without any remaining problems. In ski cross, there are four main injury situations, most of them connected to the jumping situation. Contact with the other skier in the jump, bank turning, and roller situations are important.

== Endorsement ==
Erik has his own sponsor that is Elan Skiis. Through the Swedish national team, he is also sponsored by GoodYear, Bliz, Bra, Sätila, Tenzon, Idrefjäll, and Sportringen.

He uses a lot of different brands for competition and training. He usually trains and competes with Elan skis, Head boots, Tenzon clothing, Hestra gloves, Bliz goggles, Helmet, and Swix poles.

== Competitions ==
Erik mostly trains in Åre and Edsåsdalen. At camp, he trains a lot in Idre and Hemavan. His favorite park is Bräcke in Åre, and his favorite ski cross course is in Val Thorens, France.

He won the Swedish Cup in 2015 by a substantial margin (700 points) above Alexander Lindquist (465 points). Consequently, he had the opportunity to represent Sweden in his first World Cup at home in Åre in February 2015. Erik has many positive memories of his skiing career, including when he came 4th in a European Cup, and when he raced his first World Cup. He will always remember his first gold at a FIS competition.

=== Competition statistics ===
- Junior Swedish Championship 2016: 1st place
- Junior World Championship, Val Thorens 2016: 8th place.
- European Cup, Idre 2016: 4th place.
- Swedish cup 2015: 1st place
- World Cup Åre 2015: 36th place.
