= Robert Winkler =

Austrian freestyle skier

Personal information
- Born: 24 January 1991 (age 35) Bruck an der Mur, Austria
- Height: 190 cm (6 ft 3 in)

Sport
- Country: Austria
- Sport: Freestyle skiing
- Event: Ski cross

Robert Winkler (born 24 January 1991) is an Austrian freestyle skier. He competed at the 2018 Winter Olympics and the 2022 Winter Olympics.
