= Satoshi Furuno =

Japanese freestyle skier (born 1999)

Personal information
- Born: 11 June 1999 (age 26) Toyama, Japan

Sport
- Sport: Freestyle skiing
- Event: Ski cross

Satoshi Furuno (古野慧, Furuno Satoshi; born 11 June 1999) is a Japanese freestyle skier specializing in ski cross. He represented Japan at the 2022 and 2026 Winter Olympics.

== Career ==
In January 2026, he was selected to represent Japan at the 2026 Winter Olympics. He competed in the ski cross event and ranked second during qualification.
