= Simone Deromedis =

Italian freestyle skier (born 2000)

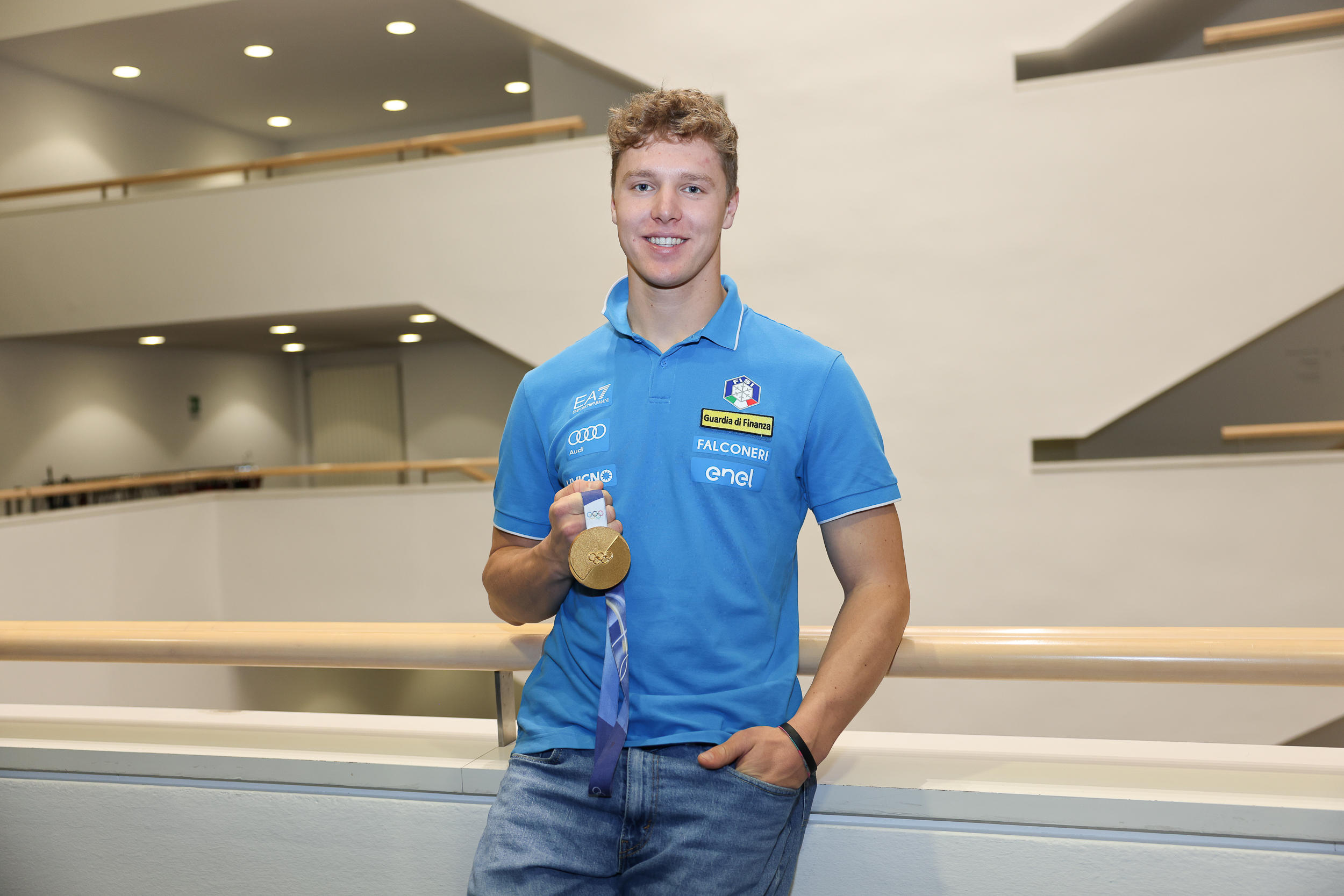
- Deromedis in 2026

Personal information
- Nationality: Italian
- Born: 2 April 2000 (age 26) Trento, Italy
- Height: 1.89 m (6 ft 2 in)

Sport
- Sport: Freestyle skiing
- Club: Fiamme Gialle

World Cup career
- Seasons: 7 – (2020–2026)
- Indiv. podiums: 20
- Indiv. wins: 8
Medal record
Men's freestyle skiing
Representing Italy
Olympic Games
Gold medal – first place	2026 Milano Cortina	Ski cross
World Championships
Gold medal – first place	2023 Bakuriani	Ski cross

Simone Deromedis (born 2 April 2000) is an Italian freestyle skier who specializes in the ski cross discipline. He represents Italy at the Winter Olympic Games, being a men's ski cross gold medalist in the 2026 edition. He also earned a World title in 2023.

== Career ==
Born in Trento, he is an athlete of the Gruppo Sportivo Fiamme Gialle. He has won 7 World cup races out of 19 total podiums.

Deromedis represented Italian team at the 2022 Beijing Winter Olympics, finishing fifth in the ski cross event. At the 2023 World Championships held in Bakuriani, Georgia, he won the gold medal in that discipline.

At the 2026 Milano Cortina Winter Olympics, Deromedis became the men's ski cross champion, ahead of compatriot Federico Tomasoni.
