= Undersåker =

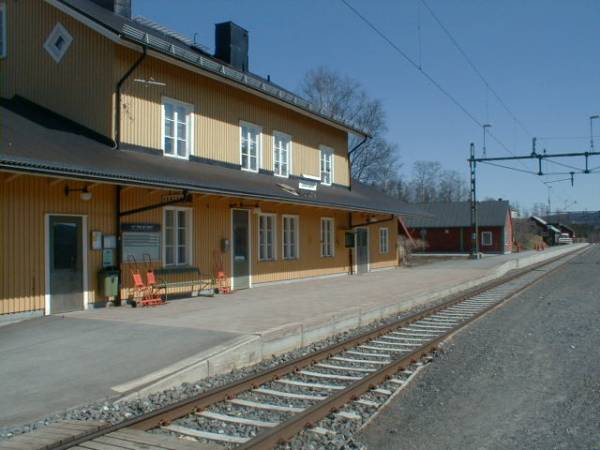
- Undersåker railway station

- Location within Jämtland Location within Sweden
- Coordinates: 63°18′55″N 13°15′2″E
- Country: Sweden
- Province: Jämtland
- County: Jämtland County
- Municipality: Åre Municipality

Area
  - Total: 0.81 km^{2} (0.31 sq mi)

Population (31 December 2010)
  - Total: 438
  - Density: 543/km^{2} (1,410/sq mi)
- Time zone: UTC+1 (CET)
  - Summer (DST): UTC+2 (CEST)

Undersåker is a locality situated in Åre Municipality, Jämtland County, Sweden with 438 inhabitants in 2010. Edsåsdalen lies within the Undersåker locality approximately 8 kilometres (5.0 mi) from the railway station.
