= Alex Fiva =

Swiss freestyle skier (born 1986)

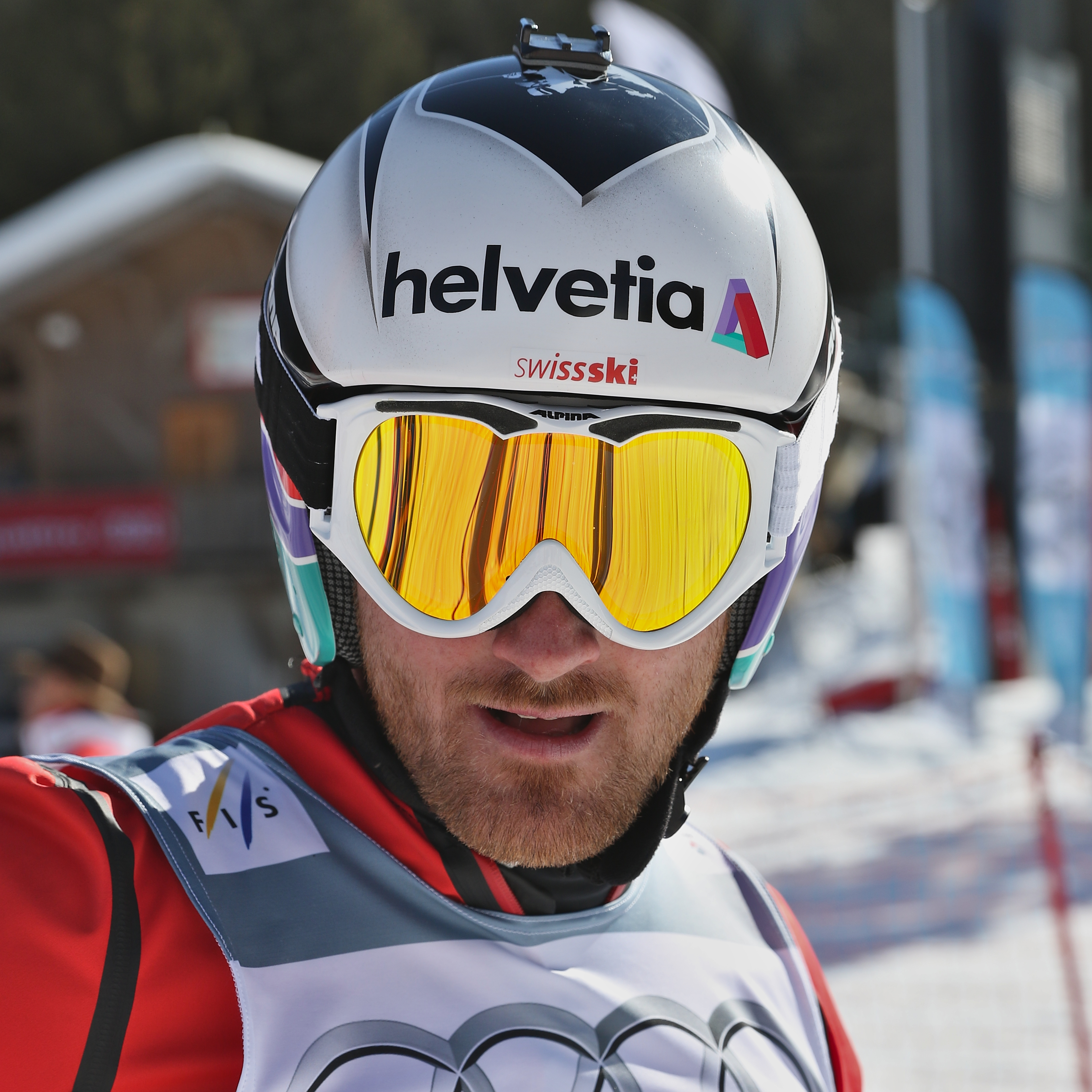
- Fiva in 2015

Personal information
- Nationality: Swiss
- Born: 29 January 1986 (age 40) Newport Beach, California
- Height: 1.88 m (6 ft 2 in)

Sport
- Sport: Skiing
- Club: SC Parpan

World Cup career
- Seasons: 19 – (2008–2026)
- Indiv. podiums: 40
- Indiv. wins: 14
Medal record
Men's freestyle skiing
Representing Switzerland
Olympic Games
Silver medal – second place	2022 Beijing	Ski cross
Bronze medal – third place	2026 Milano Cortina	Ski cross
World Championships
Gold medal – first place	2021 Idre	Ski cross
- Updated on 12 March 2026

Alex Fiva (born 29 January 1986) is a Swiss freestyle skier who specializes in the ski cross discipline. He represented Switzerland in the 2022 and 2026 editions of the Winter Olympics, winning silver and bronze, respectively.

== Career ==
Fiva started his career as an alpine skier who had some success as a junior. In 2006 he was the Swiss Junior Bronze medalist in the slalom discipline; however, he quit alpine skiing in 2007.

Having switched to freestyle ski cross, he made his World Cup debut in March 2008 in Meiringen, with a 29th place. However, it wasn't until early 2010 that he showed his potential, winning back-to-back Europa Cup races. These results earned him a place in the Swiss World Cup squad for the end of the season, his best result being 12th place in Grindelwald.

At the start of the 2010–2011 season, he took another step forward. In the second World Cup event of the season in Innichen, he came from nowhere to secure 2nd place, having been 35th the day before. He followed this up with two more top 5 finishes. He was chosen to represent Switzerland at the FIS Freestyle World Ski Championships 2011 in Deer Valley Resort. He only managed 25th place. In the next World Cup event, he sustained an injury which kept him out for the rest of the season.

It was in the 2011–2012 season that his real breakthrough came. He again finished on the podium in Innichen in the second World Cup event of the year, coming in third. He won his first World Cup in the night event in St. Johann in Tirol, and his second win came in the next week in Les Contamines.
