= Jared Schmidt =

Canadian freestyle skier

Personal information
- Born: 18 April 1997 (age 29) Ottawa, Ontario, Canada

Sport
- Country: Canada
- Sport: Freestyle skiing
- Event: Ski cross

Jared Schmidt (born 18 April 1997) is a Canadian freestyle skier who competes internationally in the ski cross discipline. He represented Canada at the 2022 and 2026 Winter Olympics.

== Career ==
Schmidt has been part of the national team since 2018.

Schmidt has won two World Cup medals, both bronzes. The first one came in February 2021, in Bakuriani, Georgia, with the second one coming in December 2021.

On January 24, 2022, Schmidt was named to Canada's 2022 Olympic team along with his sister Hannah Schmidt, who also competed in the women's ski cross event.
