= Reece Howden =

Canadian freestyle skier (born 1998)

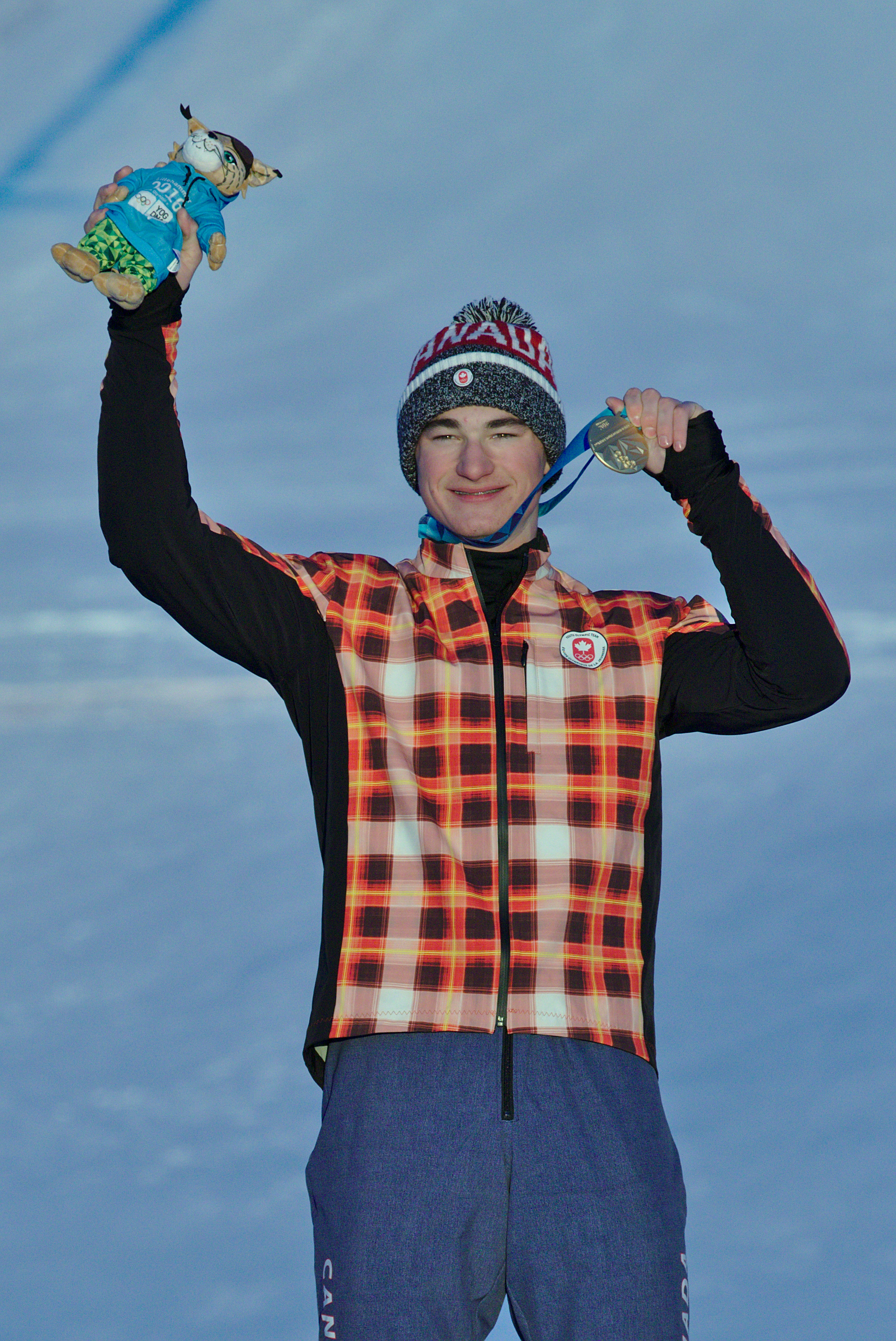
- Howden at the 2016 Winter Youth Olympics

Personal information
- Born: 12 July 1998 (age 28) Chilliwack, British Columbia, Canada

Sport
- Country: Canada
- Sport: Freestyle skiing
- Event: Ski cross
Medal record
Men's freestyle skiing
Representing Canada
World Championships
Silver medal – second place	2023 Bakuriani	Mixed team ski cross
Winter Youth Olympics
Gold medal – first place	2016 Lillehammer	Boys' ski cross

Reece Howden (born 12 July 1998) is a Canadian freestyle skier who competes internationally in the ski cross discipline. He represented Canada at the 2022 and 2026 Winter Olympics.

== Career ==
=== Junior ===
At the 2016 Winter Youth Olympics in Lillehammer, Norway, Howden won the gold medal in the ski cross event and was Canada's flagbearer during the closing ceremony.

=== Senior ===
Howden won his first World Cup race in 2020, his rookie season. Howden would go on to win the crystal globe, awarded to the overall points leader per discipline for the 2020–21 FIS Freestyle Ski World Cup season. During the season Howden won four races and had two other podium finishes.

Howden had a fifth-place finish at the 2021 World Championships.

Howden represented Canada at the 2022 Winter Olympics in Beijing, China, where he finished 3rd in the quarterfinals, so did not advance to the semi-finals, and finished 9th overall.

Howden won a 2nd Crystal Globe at the end of the 2022–23 FIS Freestyle Ski World Cup season, finishing atop the points standings, reaching the podium seven times including three victories.

In 2024–25 FIS Freestyle Ski World Cup season, Howden won 7 races, including both at the end of the season in Idre Fjall, Sweden, and as a result, won the Crystal Globe - most performance points for the season - for a third time. His last win was Howden's 18th world cup victory.
