= Niklas Bachsleitner =

German freestyle skier (born 1996)

Personal information
- Nationality: German
- Born: 3 May 1996 (age 30) Garmisch-Partenkirchen, Germany

Sport
- Sport: Freestyle skiing
- Event: Ski cross
- Club: SC Partenkirchen

Niklas Bachsleitner (born 3 May 1996) is a German Ski cross skier. He competed in the 2022 Winter Olympics.

== Career ==
He made his World Championships debut in 2021 finishing sixth in ski cross. In 21 World Cup starts, his first and only podium finish is third in 2021 Idre Fjall. He currently resides in Grainau. Outside of his athletics career, he is also a soldier.
