= Florian Wilmsmann =

German freestyle skier (born 1996)

Personal information
- Nationality: German
- Born: 21 January 1996 (age 30) Tegernsee, Germany
- Height: 1.78 m (5 ft 10 in)

Sport
- Sport: Freestyle skiing
Medal record
Men's freestyle skiing
Representing Germany
World Championships
| Silver medal – second place | 2023 Bakuriani | Ski cross |
Winter Universiade
| Bronze medal – third place | 2019 Krasnoyarsk | Ski cross |

Florian Wilmsmann (born 21 January 1996) is a German freestyle skier. He competed at the 2018, 2022 and 2026 Winter Olympics.

In December 2025, Wilmsmann was issued with a 19-month ban for an anti-doping rule violation for whereabouts failures. The ban was backdated to run from April 2023 and November 2024 with all his results during that period disqualified.
