= Ryō Sugai =

Japanese freestyle skier (born 1991)

Personal information
- Born: 11 December 1991 (age 34) Tainai, Japan

Sport
- Country: Japan
- Sport: Freestyle skiing
- Event: Ski cross
Medal record
Men's freestyle skiing
Representing Japan
World Championships
Bronze medal – third place	2025 Engadin	Ski cross

Ryō Sugai (須貝 龍, Sugai Ryō; born 11 December 1991) is a Japanese freestyle skier who represented Japan at the 2022 Winter Olympics and 2026 Winter Olympics.

== Career ==
Sugai represented Japan at the 2025 Snowboarding World Championships in the ski cross event. Sugai crashed at the start, recovered his skis and eventually finished the course. Youri Duplessis Kergomard crossed the line in second, however, the jury ruled that Kergomard impeded Tobias Müller, and he received a yellow card. As a result, Sugai won the bronze medal. This was Japan's first ever FIS Freestyle World Ski Championships medal in ski cross.
