= Bastien Midol =

French freestyle skier

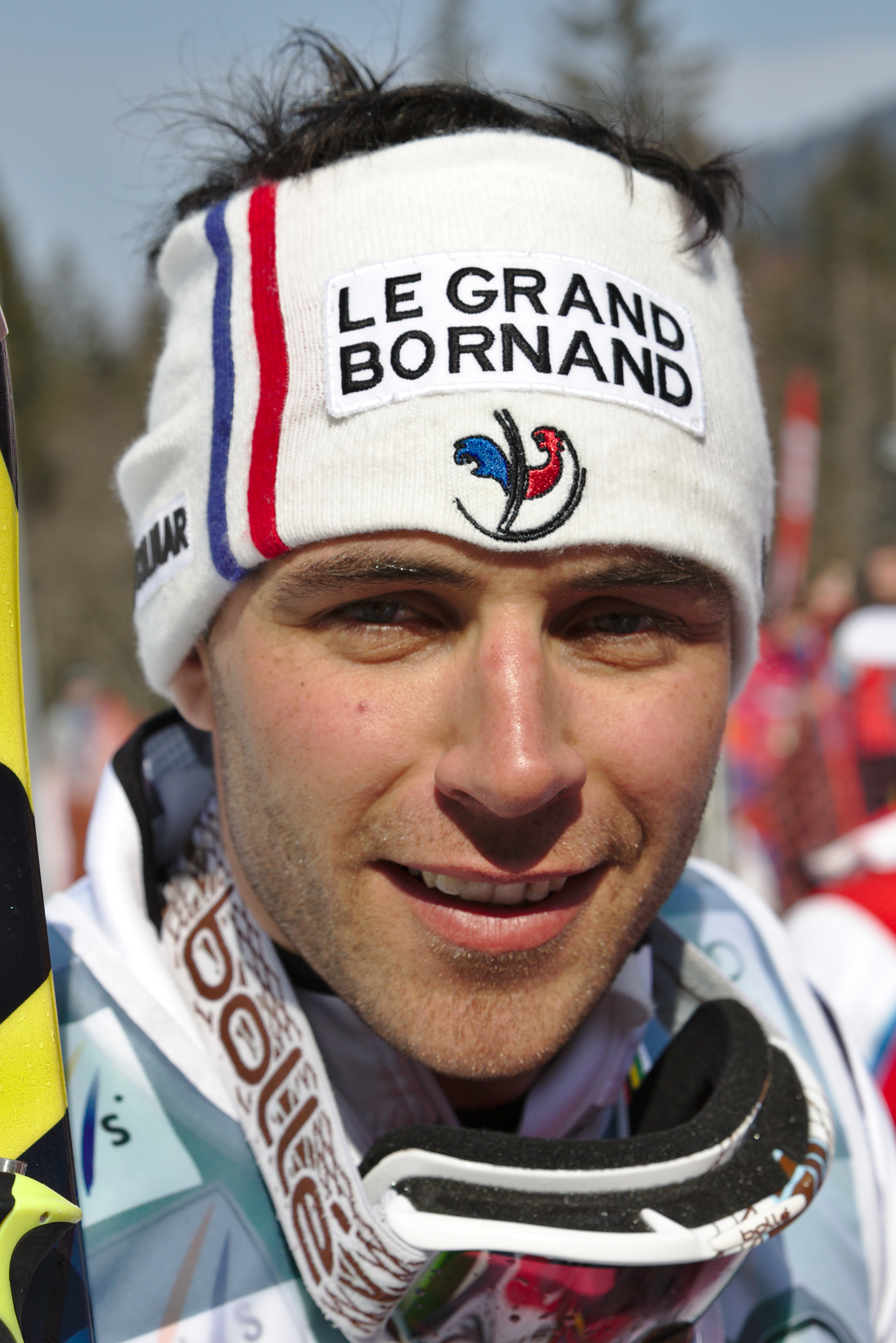
- Midol in 2015

Personal information
- Born: 3 August 1990 (age 35) Annecy, France
- Height: 191 cm (6 ft 3 in)
- Weight: 94 kg (207 lb)
Medal record
Men's freestyle skiing
Representing France
World Championships
Silver medal – second place	2013 Voss	Ski cross
Winter X Games
Silver medal – second place	2016 Aspen	Ski cross

Bastien Midol (born 3 August 1990) is a French freestyle skier. He has won 4 FIS World Cups and won a silver medal at the 2013 FIS Freestyle World Ski Championships. His brother is also a medallist skier, Jonathan Midol.

Midol won the 2019 Ski Cross Crystal Globe, and came 2nd in the Overall Freestyle Rankings.
