= Italy at the 2026 Winter Olympics =

- Flag of Italy
- IOC code: ITA
- NOC: Italian National Olympic Committee
- Website: www.coni.it/en

in Milan and Cortina d'Ampezzo, Italy 6 February 2026 – 22 February 2026
- Competitors: 196 (103 men and 93 women) in 16 sports
- Flag bearers (opening): Arianna Fontana & Federico Pellegrino (Milan); Federica Brignone & Amos Mosaner (Cortina d'Ampezzo)
- Flag bearers (closing): Lisa Vittozzi & Davide Ghiotto
- Officials: Carlo Mornati (chef de mission)
- Medals Ranked 4th: Gold 10 Silver 6 Bronze 14 Total 30

Winter Olympics appearances (overview)
- 1924; 1928; 1932; 1936; 1948; 1952; 1956; 1960; 1964; 1968; 1972; 1976; 1980; 1984; 1988; 1992; 1994; 1998; 2002; 2006; 2010; 2014; 2018; 2022; 2026

Italy was the host nation of the 2026 Winter Olympics in Milan and Cortina d'Ampezzo, from 6 to 22 February 2026.

Italy ended the 2026 Winter Olympics by winning 10 gold, 6 silver and 14 bronze medals, setting a new record in number of medals won (20 medals was the previous record, reached in Lillehammer 1994). This new record comes 5 years after the new record in summer olympics set in Tokyo 2020 Summer Olympics (that were held in 2021) and equalled in Paris 2024 Summer Olympics. Moreover Italy won more gold and bronze medals than in any other winter Olympics (the previous records being 7 and 8, respectively), and clinched at least one medal in ten different sports.

On 18 February, short-track speed skater Arianna Fontana won her third medal at these Olympics and her fourteenth overall, becoming Italy's record medal-winning athlete of all time (previous record was held by Italian fencer Edoardo Mangiarotti, with 13 medals).

== Competitors ==
The following is the list of number of competitors participating at the Games per sport/discipline. This includes quotas from host country allocations.

Sport	Men	Women	Total
Alpine skiing	10	11	21
Biathlon	5	5	10
Bobsleigh	5	5	10
Cross-country skiing	6	7	13
Curling	5	5	10
Figure skating	5	4	9
Freestyle skiing	5	5	10
Ice hockey	25	23	48
Luge	7	4	11
Nordic combined	3	—N/a	3
Short-track speed skating	5	5	10
Skeleton	2	2	4
Ski jumping	3	4	7
Ski mountaineering	1	2	3
Snowboarding	9	8	17
Speed skating	7	3	10
Total	103	93	196

== Medalists ==
The following Italian competitors won medals at the games. In the discipline sections below, the medalists' names are bolded.

Medal	Name	Sport	Event	Date
Gold	Francesca Lollobrigida	Speed skating	Women's 3000 metres	7 February
Gold	Elisa Confortola; Arianna Fontana; Thomas Nadalini; Pietro Sighel; Luca Spechenhauser; Chiara Betti	Short-track speed skating	Mixed 2000 metre relay	10 February
Gold	Andrea Vötter; Marion Oberhofer	Luge	Women's doubles	11 February
Gold	Emanuel Rieder; Simon Kainzwaldner	Luge	Men's doubles	11 February
Gold	Federica Brignone	Alpine skiing	Women's super-G	12 February
Gold	Francesca Lollobrigida	Speed skating	Women's 5000 metres	12 February
Gold	Federica Brignone	Alpine skiing	Women's giant slalom	15 February
Gold	Lisa Vittozzi	Biathlon	Women's pursuit	15 February
Gold	Davide Ghiotto; Andrea Giovannini; Michele Malfatti	Speed skating	Men's team pursuit	17 February
Gold	Simone Deromedis	Freestyle skiing	Men's ski cross	21 February
Silver	Giovanni Franzoni	Alpine skiing	Men's downhill	7 February
Silver	Tommaso Giacomel; Lukas Hofer; Dorothea Wierer; Lisa Vittozzi	Biathlon	Mixed relay	8 February
Silver	Arianna Fontana	Short-track speed skating	Women’s 500 metres	12 February
Silver	Lorenzo Sommariva; Michela Moioli	Snowboarding	Mixed team snowboard cross	15 February
Silver	Elisa Confortola; Arianna Fontana; Chiara Betti; Arianna Sighel	Short-track speed skating	Women's 3000 metre relay	18 February
Silver	Federico Tomasoni	Freestyle skiing	Men's ski cross	21 February
Bronze	Dominik Paris	Alpine skiing	Men's downhill	7 February
Bronze	Sofia Goggia	Alpine skiing	Women's downhill	8 February
Bronze	Lucia Dalmasso	Snowboarding	Women's parallel giant slalom	8 February
Bronze	Riccardo Lorello	Speed skating	Men's 5000 metres	8 February
Bronze	Dominik Fischnaller	Luge	Men's singles	8 February
Bronze	Daniel Grassl; Matteo Rizzo; Lara Naki Gutmann; Sara Conti; Niccolò Macii; Charlène Guignard; Marco Fabbri	Figure skating	Team event	8 February
Bronze	Stefania Constantini; Amos Mosaner	Curling	Mixed doubles	10 February
Bronze	Verena Hofer; Emanuel Rieder; Simon Kainzwaldner; Dominik Fischnaller; Andrea Vötter; Marion Oberhofer	Luge	Team Relay	12 February
Bronze	Michela Moioli	Snowboarding	Women's snowboard cross	13 February
Bronze	Davide Graz; Elia Barp; Martino Carollo; Federico Pellegrino	Cross-country skiing	Men's 4 × 7.5 km relay	15 February
Bronze	Flora Tabanelli	Freestyle skiing	Women's big air	16 February
Bronze	Elia Barp; Federico Pellegrino	Cross-country skiing	Men's team sprint	18 February
Bronze	Andrea Cassinelli; Thomas Nadalini; Pietro Sighel; Luca Spechenhauser	Short-track speed skating	Men's 5000 metre relay	20 February
Bronze	Andrea Giovannini	Speed skating	Men's mass start	21 February

Medals by date
**Day**	**Date**	1st place, gold medalist(s)	2nd place, silver medalist(s)	3rd place, bronze medalist(s)	Total
1	7 February	1	1	1	3
2	8 February	0	1	5	6
3	9 February	0	0	0	0
4	10 February	1	0	1	2
5	11 February	2	0	0	2
6	12 February	2	1	1	4
7	13 February	0	0	1	1
8	14 February	0	0	0	0
9	15 February	2	1	1	4
10	16 February	0	0	1	1
11	17 February	1	0	0	1
12	18 February	0	1	1	2
13	19 February	0	0	0	0
14	20 February	0	0	1	1
15	21 February	1	1	1	3
16	22 February	0	0	0	0
Total		10	6	14	30

Medals by sport
Sport	1st place, gold medalist(s)	2nd place, silver medalist(s)	3rd place, bronze medalist(s)	Total
Speed skating	3	0	2	**5**
Alpine skiing	2	1	2	**5**
Luge	2	0	2	**4**
Short-track speed skating	1	2	1	**4**
Freestyle skiing	1	1	1	**3**
Biathlon	1	1	0	**2**
Snowboarding	0	1	2	**3**
Cross-country skiing	0	0	2	**2**
Curling	0	0	1	**1**
Figure skating	0	0	1	**1**
Total	10	6	14	**30**

Medals by gender
Gender	1st place, gold medalist(s)	2nd place, silver medalist(s)	3rd place, bronze medalist(s)	Total
Male	3	2	7	**12**
Female	6	2	4	**12**
Mixed	1	2	3	**6**
Total	10	6	14	30

Multiple medalists
**Name**	**Sport**	1st place, gold medalist(s)	2nd place, silver medalist(s)	3rd place, bronze medalist(s)	Total
Arianna Fontana	Short-track speed skating	1	2	0	3
Federica Brignone	Alpine skiing	2	0	0	2
Francesca Lollobrigida	Speed skating	2	0	0	2
Lisa Vittozzi	Biathlon	1	1	0	2
Chiara Betti	Short-track speed skating	1	1	0	2
Elisa Confortola	Short-track speed skating	1	1	0	2
Andrea Vötter	Luge	1	0	1	2
Marion Oberhofer	Luge	1	0	1	2
Emanuel Rieder	Luge	1	0	1	2
Simon Kainzwaldner	Luge	1	0	1	2
Thomas Nadalini	Short-track speed skating	1	0	1	2
Pietro Sighel	Short-track speed skating	1	0	1	2
Luca Spechenhauser	Short-track speed skating	1	0	1	2
Andrea Giovannini	Speed skating	1	0	1	2
Michela Moioli	Snowboarding	0	1	1	2
Dominik Fischnaller	Luge	0	0	2	2
Elia Barp	Cross-country skiing	0	0	2	2
Federico Pellegrino	Cross-country skiing	0	0	2	2

== Alpine skiing ==
Italy qualified 11 female and 10 male alpine skiers.

=== Men ===
Athlete	Event	Run 1		Run 2		Total	
Athlete	Event	Time	Rank	Time	Rank	Time	Rank
Mattia Casse	Downhill	—N/a				1:53.28	11
Mattia Casse	Super-G	—N/a				1:27.41	24
Luca De Aliprandini	Giant slalom	DNF					
Giovanni Franzoni	Downhill	—N/a				1:51.81	2nd place, silver medalist(s)
Giovanni Franzoni	Super-G	—N/a				1:25.95	6
Giovanni Franzoni	Giant slalom	1:17.86	26	1:11.27	16	2:29.13	24
Christof Innerhofer	Super-G	—N/a				1:26.50	11
Tobias Kastlunger	Giant slalom	DNF					
Tobias Kastlunger	Slalom	DSQ					
Dominik Paris	Downhill	—N/a				1:52.11	3rd place, bronze medalist(s)
Dominik Paris	Super-G	—N/a				DNF	
Tommaso Saccardi	Slalom	58.37	10	57.97	17	1:56.34	12
Tommaso Sala	Slalom	DNF					
Florian Schieder	Downhill	—N/a				1:53.57	17
Alex Vinatzer	Giant slalom	1:16.31	11	DNF			
Alex Vinatzer	Slalom	DNF					
Florian Schieder; Tobias Kastlunger	Team combined	DNF					
Giovanni Franzoni; Alex Vinatzer	Team combined	1:51.80	1	53.46	18	2:45.26	7
Dominik Paris; Tommaso Sala	Team combined	1:52.39	5	52.77	12	2:45.16	5
Mattia Casse; Tommaso Saccardi	Team combined	1:53.26	12	52.91	14	2:46.17	14

=== Women ===
Athlete	Event	Run 1		Run 2		Total	
Athlete	Event	Time	Rank	Time	Rank	Time	Rank
Federica Brignone	Downhill	—N/a				1:37.29	10
Federica Brignone	Super-G	—N/a				1:23.41	1st place, gold medalist(s)
Federica Brignone	Giant slalom	1:03.23	1	1:10.27	14	2:13.50	1st place, gold medalist(s)
Elena Curtoni	Super-G	—N/a				1:24.18	7
Giada D'Antonio	Slalom	DNS					
Nicol Delago	Downhill	—N/a				1:37.65	11
Lara Della Mea	Giant slalom	1:04.42	15	1:09.75	4	2:14.17	4
Lara Della Mea	Slalom	49.14	15	52.99	17	1:42.13	=13
Sofia Goggia	Downhill	—N/a				1:36.69	3rd place, bronze medalist(s)
Sofia Goggia	Super-G	—N/a				DNF	
Sofia Goggia	Giant slalom	1:03.69	3	1:10.68	23	2:14.37	10
Martina Peterlini	Slalom	49.67	23	52.46	7	1:42.13	=13
Laura Pirovano	Downhill	—N/a				1:37.04	6
Laura Pirovano	Super-G	—N/a				1:24.17	6
Anna Trocker	Slalom	DNF					
Asja Zenere	Giant slalom	1:05.13	22	1:09.50	1	2:14.63	14
Laura Pirovano; Martina Peterlini	Team combined	1:36.86	3	DNF			
Sofia Goggia; Lara Della Mea	Team combined	DNF		DNS		DNF	
Nicol Delago; Anna Trocker	Team combined	1:37.75	10	45.19	14	2:22.94	10
Nadia Delago; Giada D'Antonio	Team combined	1:39.42	20	DNF			

== Biathlon ==
Italy qualified five female and five male biathletes through the 2024–25 Biathlon World Cup score.

A few days before the start of the 2026 Winter Olympics, Rebecca Passler was provisionally suspended due to a suspected violation of the Anti-Doping Code. The suspension was then overturned on 13 February 2026 by the National Anti-Doping Appeal Court, as Passler had credibly demonstrated that the positive letrozole sample was due to accidental domestic contamination. Reinstated to the national biathlon team, Passler was nevertheless not selected for the relay.

Men

Athlete	Event	Time	Misses	Rank
Patrick Braunhofer	Men's individual	55:01.7	1 (0+0+1+0)	14
Tommaso Giacomel	Men's individual	53:59.0	3 (1+1+0+1)	6
Lukas Hofer	Men's individual	55:32.5	3 (0+0+1+2)	16
Elia Zeni	Men's individual	56:46.5	3 (1+2+0+0)	25
Tommaso Giacomel	Men's sprint	24:36.5	3 (2+1)	22
Lukas Hofer	Men's sprint	24:15.2	1 (0+1)	13
Elia Zeni	Men's sprint	26:00.4	3 (2+1)	62
Nicola Romanin	Men's sprint	24:27.5	0 (0+0)	16
Tommaso Giacomel	Men's pursuit	32:27.1	2 (1+1+0+0)	9
Lukas Hofer	Men's pursuit	33:39.8	3 (0+1+1+1)	13
Nicola Romanin	Men's pursuit	34:29.5	4 (1+1+1+1)	28
Tommaso Giacomel	Men's mass start	DNF		
Lukas Hofer	Men's mass start	44:09.5	8 (1+1+4+2)	25
Nicola Romanin	Men's mass start	45:14.0	8 (2+2+2+2)	28
Patrick Braunhofer; Lukas Hofer; Nicola Romanin; Tommaso Giacomel	Team relay	1:24:23.7	0+9	14

Women

Athlete	Event	Time	Misses	Rank
Hannah Auchentaller	Women's individual	44:47.4	2 (0+1+1+0)	30
Michela Carrara	Women's individual	47:43.9	2 (2+2+0+2)	65
Lisa Vittozzi	Women's individual	45:09.3	4 (1+1+1+1)	37
Dorothea Wierer	Women's individual	42:49.5	1 (0+1+0+0)	5
Hannah Auchentaller	Women's sprint	22:52.4	2 (1+1)	43
Michela Carrara	Women's sprint	22:14.3	2 (0+2)	23
Lisa Vittozzi	Women's sprint	21:21.4	0 (0+0)	5
Dorothea Wierer	Women's sprint	22:53.7	3 (2+1)	44
Hannah Auchentaller	Women's pursuit	32:56.2	2 (0+0+1+1)	26
Michela Carrara	Women's pursuit	33:57.1	7 (1+2+3+1)	36
Lisa Vittozzi	Women's pursuit	30:11.8	0 (0+0+0+0)	1st place, gold medalist(s)
Dorothea Wierer	Women's pursuit	31:42.1	1 (0+1+0+0)	9
Lisa Vittozzi	Women's mass start	39:01.6	4 (1+1+0+2)	18
Dorothea Wierer	Women's mass start	37:48.1	2 (0+1+1+0)	5
Hannah Auchentaller; Dorothea Wierer; Michela Carrara; Lisa Vittozzi	Team relay	1:14:17.4	2+13	11

Mixed

Athlete	Event	Time	Misses	Rank
Tommaso Giacomel; Lukas Hofer; Dorothea Wierer; Lisa Vittozzi	Relay	1:04:41.3	0+5	2nd place, silver medalist(s)

== Bobsleigh ==
Athlete	Event	Run 1		Run 2		Run 3		Run 4		Total	
Athlete	Event	Time	Rank	Time	Rank	Time	Rank	Time	Rank	Time	Rank
Patrick Baumgartner*; Robert Mircea	Two-man	55.58	6	56.00	10	55.49	8	55.60	6	3:42.67	7
Patrick Baumgartner*; Lorenzo Bilotti; Eric Fantazzini; Robert Mircea	Four-man	54.55	7	54.84	5	54.57	4	54.93	6	3:38.89	5
Giada Andreutti	Monobob	1:01.21	25	1:00.76	18	1:01.10	23	DNA		3:03.07	24
Simona de Silvestro	Monobob	1:01.04	23	1:00.80	19	1:00.68	22	DNA		3:02.52	23
Giada Andreutti*; Alessia Gatti	Two-woman	57.76	16	58.16	22	58.28	16	58.97	20	3:53.17	20
Simona de Silvestro*; Anna Costella	Two-woman	58.33	24	57.93	18	58.62	23	Did not advance			

== Cross-country skiing ==
Italy qualified seven female and five male cross-country skiers.

=== Distance ===
Men

Athlete	Event	Classical		Freestyle		Final		
Athlete	Event	Time	Rank	Time	Rank	Time	Deficit	Rank
Elia Barp	20 km skiathlon	24:24.4	25	22:30.4	10	47:22.5	+1:11.5	14
Elia Barp	50 kilometre classical	—N/a				2:18:22.9	+11:38.1	22
Martino Carollo	10 kilometre freestyle	—N/a				21:15.8	+39.6	7
Martino Carollo	20 km skiathlon	24:38.9	32	23:17.9	20	48:27.5	+2:16.5	23
Simone Dapra	10 kilometre freestyle	—N/a				21:47.5	+1:11.3	17
Simone Dapra	50 kilometre classical	—N/a				2:15:12.7	+8:27.9	18
Davide Graz	10 kilometre freestyle	—N/a				22:35.7	+1:59.5	41
Davide Graz	20 km skiathlon	24:04.2	11	22:27.9	8	47:00.0	+49.0	8
Simone Mocellini	10 kilometre freestyle	—N/a				24:00.8	+3:24.6	68
Federico Pellegrino	20 km skiathlon	24:26.7	29	23:04.8	17	48:02.5	+1:51.5	20
Federico Pellegrino	50 kilometre classical	—N/a				DNS		
Davide Graz; Elia Barp; Martino Carollo; Federico Pellegrino	4 x 7.5 km relay	—N/a				1:05:12.4	+47.9	3rd place, bronze medalist(s)

Women

Athlete	Event	Classical		Freestyle		Final		
Athlete	Event	Time	Rank	Time	Rank	Time	Deficit	Rank
Anna Comarella	10 kilometre freestyle	—N/a				26:00.6	+3:11.4	46
Anna Comarella	20 km skiathlon	30:06.1	41	29:15.6	36	59:53.7	+6:08.5	36
Anna Comarella	50 kilometre classical	—N/a				2:31.01.4	+14:33.2	16
Martina di Centa	10 kilometre freestyle	—N/a				24:44.9	+1:55.7	20
Martina di Centa	20 km skiathlon	29:37.9	27	28:25.6	26	58:35.2	+4:50.0	28
Caterina Ganz	10 kilometre freestyle	—N/a				25:13.1	+2:23.9	32
Maria Gismondi	10 kilometre freestyle	—N/a				26:27.6	+3:38.4	59
Maria Gismondi	20 km skiathlon	31:31.4	49	30:10.9	44	1:02:11.9	+8:26.7	48
Iris De Martin Pinter; Caterina Ganz; Martina Di Centa; Federica Cassol	4 x 7.5 km relay	—N/a				1:17:44.5	+1:59.7	6

=== Sprint ===
Men

Athlete	Event	Qualification		Quarterfinal		Semifinal		Final	
Athlete	Event	Time	Rank	Time	Rank	Time	Rank	Time	Rank
Elia Barp	Men's sprint	3:18.27	26 Q	3:31.48	5	Did not advance			
Simone Dapra	Men's sprint	3:18.14	24 Q	3:38.70	2 Q	3:45.12	6	Did not advance	
Simone Mocellini	Men's sprint	3:16.24	17 Q	3:31.03	1 Q	3:56.89	6	Did not advance	
Federico Pellegrino	Men's sprint	3:16.11	15 Q	3:28.77	3 q	3:42.42	3	Did not advance	
Elia Barp; Federico Pellegrino	Men's team sprint	5:49.10	3 Q	—N/a				18:32.2	3rd place, bronze medalist(s)

Women

Athlete	Event	Qualification		Quarterfinal		Semifinal		Final	
Athlete	Event	Time	Rank	Time	Rank	Time	Rank	Time	Rank
Federica Cassol	Women's sprint	3:42.48	9 Q	3:59.10	2 Q	4:33.14	6	Did not advance	
Iris De Martin Pinter	Women's sprint	3:46.30	19 Q	3:59.25	4	Did not advance			
Caterina Ganz	Women's sprint	3:42.13	8 Q	3:56.05	2 Q	4:12.52	5	Did not advance	
Nicole Monsorno	Women's sprint	3:39.97	6 Q	4:00.68	5	Did not advance			
Caterina Ganz; Iris De Martin Pinter	Women's team sprint	6:51.19	9 Q	—N/a				21:10.87	8

== Curling ==
Summary

Team	Event	Group stage										Semifinal	Final / BM	
Team	Event	Opposition Score	Opposition Score	Opposition Score	Opposition Score	Opposition Score	Opposition Score	Opposition Score	Opposition Score	Opposition Score	Rank	Opposition Score	Opposition Score	Rank
Joël Retornaz; Amos Mosaner; Sebastiano Arman; Mattia Giovanella; Alberto Pimpini	Men's tournament	SWE; W 7–6	GBR; W 9–7	GER; L 5–6	NOR; L 7–10	CZE; W 10–5	CHN; L 4–11	USA; W 8–5	CAN; L 3–8	SUI; L 5–9	6	Did not advance		
Stefania Constantini; Elena Mathis; Marta Lo Deserto; Giulia Zardini Lacedelli; Rebecca Mariani	Women's tournament	SUI; L 4–7	KOR; L 2–7	CHN; L 7–8	SWE; L 6–8	DEN; L 2–7	USA; W 7–2	JPN; W 8–6	CAN; L 7–8	GBR; L 4–7	9	Did not advance		
Stefania Constantini; Amos Mosaner	Mixed doubles tournament	KOR; W 8–4	CAN; L 2–7	SUI; W 12–4	EST; W 7–4	SWE; L 4–9	NOR; W 6–5	CZE; W 8–2	GBR; L 6–9	USA; W 7–6	2 Q	USA; L 8–9	GBR; W 5–3	3rd place, bronze medalist(s)

=== Men's tournament ===
Italy qualified their men's team by their status as host. Team Joël Retornaz was selected to represent Italy in the men's event.

Final Round Robin Standings
Team	Skip	Pld	W	L	W–L	PF	PA	EW	EL	BE	SE	S%	DSC	Qualification
Switzerland	Yannick Schwaller	9	9	0	–	75	40	42	30	3	8	88.7%	9.506	Playoffs
Canada	Brad Jacobs	9	7	2	–	63	45	40	28	8	13	86.5%	28.844	Playoffs
Norway	Magnus Ramsfjell	9	5	4	1–0	60	61	37	38	6	7	80.8%	26.938	Playoffs
Great Britain	Bruce Mouat	9	5	4	0–1	63	48	39	33	2	10	86.4%	16.613	Playoffs
United States	Daniel Casper	9	4	5	1–1	52	65	34	37	5	3	81.7%	17.663	
Italy	Joël Retornaz	9	4	5	1–1	58	67	33	39	6	7	83.0%	17.869	
Germany	Marc Muskatewitz	9	4	5	1–1	51	57	36	37	8	7	84.4%	24.850	
Czech Republic	Lukáš Klíma	9	3	6	–	54	63	35	41	3	5	79.8%	29.013	
Sweden	Niklas Edin	9	2	7	1–0	44	63	31	39	6	3	82.5%	26.000	
China	Xu Xiaoming	9	2	7	0–1	52	63	35	40	3	5	81.4%	34.875	

Source: Official website

Round robin
Italy had a bye in draws 2, 5 and 9.

Draw 1
Wednesday, 11 February, 19:05

Sheet A	1	2	3	4	5	6	7	8	9	10	Final
Sweden (Edin) 🔨	0	0	0	1	0	2	0	2	0	1	6
Italy (Retornaz)	1	0	0	0	3	0	1	0	2	0	7

Draw 3
Friday, 13 February, 9:05

Sheet B	1	2	3	4	5	6	7	8	9	10	Final
Great Britain (Mouat) 🔨	0	1	0	2	1	0	0	2	1	0	7
Italy (Retornaz)	4	0	1	0	0	0	2	0	0	2	9

Draw 4
Friday, 13 February, 19:05

Sheet C	1	2	3	4	5	6	7	8	9	10	11	Final
Germany (Muskatewitz) 🔨	0	0	0	1	0	1	0	3	0	0	1	6
Italy (Retornaz)	0	0	1	0	1	0	2	0	0	1	0	5

Draw 6
Sunday, 15 February, 9:05

Sheet D	1	2	3	4	5	6	7	8	9	10	Final
Norway (Ramsfjell) 🔨	0	1	0	3	0	1	1	0	0	4	10
Italy (Retornaz)	0	0	1	0	4	0	0	1	1	0	7

Draw 7
Sunday, 15 February, 19:05

Sheet C	1	2	3	4	5	6	7	8	9	10	Final
Italy (Retornaz) 🔨	3	0	2	1	0	1	0	2	1	X	10
Czech Republic (Klíma)	0	2	0	0	1	0	2	0	0	X	5

Draw 8
Monday, 16 February, 14:05

Sheet D	1	2	3	4	5	6	7	8	9	10	Final
Italy (Retornaz) 🔨	0	0	0	2	0	2	0	X	X	X	4
China (Xu)	1	2	1	0	4	0	3	X	X	X	11

Draw 10
Tuesday, 17 February, 19:05

Sheet B	1	2	3	4	5	6	7	8	9	10	Final
United States (Casper) 🔨	1	0	1	0	0	0	2	0	1	0	5
Italy (Retornaz)	0	2	0	0	0	3	0	2	0	1	8

Draw 11
Wednesday, 18 February, 14:05

Sheet A	1	2	3	4	5	6	7	8	9	10	Final
Italy (Retornaz) 🔨	0	1	2	0	0	0	0	X	X	X	3
Canada (Jacobs)	0	0	0	2	1	4	1	X	X	X	8

Draw 12
Thursday, 19 February, 9:05

Sheet B	1	2	3	4	5	6	7	8	9	10	Final
Italy (Retornaz)	0	0	0	1	0	2	0	2	0	X	5
Switzerland (Schwaller) 🔨	2	0	1	0	1	0	3	0	2	X	9

=== Women's tournament ===
Italy qualified their women's team by their status as host. Team Stefania Constantini was selected to represent Italy in the women's event.

Final Round Robin Standings
Team	Skip	Pld	W	L	W–L	PF	PA	EW	EL	BE	SE	S%	DSC	Qualification
Sweden	Anna Hasselborg	9	7	2	–	65	50	45	32	5	14	81.7%	25.806	Playoffs
United States	Tabitha Peterson	9	6	3	2–0	60	54	40	37	3	13	82.1%	34.288	Playoffs
Switzerland	Silvana Tirinzoni	9	6	3	1–1	60	51	35	42	6	4	85.0%	44.338	Playoffs
Canada	Rachel Homan	9	6	3	0–2	76	59	45	38	2	9	80.3%	19.781	Playoffs
South Korea	Gim Eun-ji	9	5	4	1–0	60	53	37	35	8	11	81.2%	23.581	
Great Britain	Sophie Jackson	9	5	4	0–1	58	58	36	36	10	8	83.4%	16.938	
Denmark	Madeleine Dupont	9	4	5	–	49	58	36	38	3	11	77.0%	37.875	
Japan	Sayaka Yoshimura	9	2	7	1–1	51	69	35	43	3	6	78.6%	27.513	
Italy	Stefania Constantini	9	2	7	1–1	47	60	34	40	3	4	78.8%	34.719	
China	Wang Rui	9	2	7	1–1	56	70	37	39	3	9	82.7%	41.206	

Source: Official website

Round robin
Italy had a bye in draws 3, 7 and 10.

Draw 1
Thursday, 12 February, 9:05

Sheet C	1	2	3	4	5	6	7	8	9	10	Final
Italy (Constantini) 🔨	1	0	0	1	0	1	0	0	1	X	4
Switzerland (Tirinzoni)	0	2	0	0	2	0	2	1	0	X	7

Draw 2
Thursday, 12 February, 19:05

Sheet B	1	2	3	4	5	6	7	8	9	10	Final
Italy (Constantini)	0	0	0	0	1	0	1	X	X	X	2
South Korea (Gim) 🔨	0	1	1	1	0	4	0	X	X	X	7

Draw 4
Saturday, 14 February, 9:05

Sheet A	1	2	3	4	5	6	7	8	9	10	Final
Italy (Constantini)	0	1	0	2	0	1	0	3	0	0	7
China (Wang) 🔨	1	0	2	0	1	0	1	0	2	1	8

Draw 5
Saturday, 14 February, 19:05

Sheet D	1	2	3	4	5	6	7	8	9	10	Final
Italy (Constantini) 🔨	0	2	0	2	0	0	1	0	1	0	6
Sweden (Hasselborg)	1	0	2	0	2	1	0	1	0	1	8

Draw 6
Sunday, 15 February, 14:05

Sheet B	1	2	3	4	5	6	7	8	9	10	Final
Denmark (Dupont) 🔨	0	2	0	1	1	2	1	0	X	X	7
Italy (Constantini)	0	0	1	0	0	0	0	1	X	X	2

Draw 8
Monday, 16 February, 19:05

Sheet A	1	2	3	4	5	6	7	8	9	10	Final
United States (Peterson) 🔨	0	0	0	0	0	1	0	1	0	X	2
Italy (Constantini)	0	0	1	2	1	0	1	0	2	X	7

Draw 9
Tuesday, 17 February, 14:05

Sheet B	1	2	3	4	5	6	7	8	9	10	Final
Italy (Constantini) 🔨	0	1	0	3	0	1	0	1	0	2	8
Japan (Yoshimura)	0	0	1	0	3	0	1	0	1	0	6

Draw 11
Wednesday, 18 February, 19:05

Sheet C	1	2	3	4	5	6	7	8	9	10	11	Final
Canada (Homan)	0	2	0	1	0	2	0	0	2	0	1	8
Italy (Constantini) 🔨	1	0	1	0	0	0	1	1	0	3	0	7

Draw 12
Thursday, 19 February, 14:30

Sheet D	1	2	3	4	5	6	7	8	9	10	Final
Great Britain (Jackson) 🔨	0	1	0	2	1	0	0	0	3	0	7
Italy (Constantini)	0	0	1	0	0	2	0	0	0	1	4

=== Mixed doubles tournament ===
Italy qualified a mixed doubles team by their status as host.

Final Round Robin Standings
Team	Athletes	Pld	W	L	W–L	PF	PA	EW	EL	BE	SE	S%	DSC	Qualification
Great Britain	Jennifer Dodds / Bruce Mouat	9	8	1	–	69	46	37	30	0	11	79.6%	20.931	Playoffs
Italy	Stefania Constantini / Amos Mosaner	9	6	3	1–0	60	50	32	31	1	11	78.3%	27.931	Playoffs
United States	Cory Thiesse / Korey Dropkin	9	6	3	0–1	58	45	36	33	0	12	83.1%	25.900	Playoffs
Sweden	Isabella Wranå / Rasmus Wranå	9	5	4	–	62	55	31	34	0	9	80.1%	19.413	Playoffs
Canada	Jocelyn Peterman / Brett Gallant	9	4	5	2–0	58	52	35	31	0	10	78.5%	36.050	
Norway	Kristin Skaslien / Magnus Nedregotten	9	4	5	1–1	52	47	37	33	0	12	77.1%	24.444	
Switzerland	Briar Schwaller-Hürlimann / Yannick Schwaller	9	4	5	0–2	56	67	32	35	0	6	74.5%	24.000	
Czech Republic	Julie Zelingrová / Vít Chabičovský	9	3	6	1–0	45	62	30	34	0	6	69.1%	16.019	
South Korea	Kim Seon-yeong / Jeong Yeong-seok	9	3	6	0–1	47	64	32	34	0	9	75.1%	42.425	
Estonia	Marie Kaldvee / Harri Lill	9	2	7	–	46	65	32	39	0	7	71.6%	19.300	

Source: Official website

Round robin
Italy had a bye in draws 1, 3, 7, and 10.

Draw 2
Thursday, 5 February, 10:05

Sheet D	1	2	3	4	5	6	7	8	Final
South Korea (Kim / Jeong) 🔨	1	0	0	0	1	0	2	X	4
Italy (Constantini / Mosaner)	0	1	2	3	0	2	0	X	8

Draw 4
Thursday, 5 February, 19:05

Sheet A	1	2	3	4	5	6	7	8	Final
Canada (Peterman / Gallant) 🔨	5	0	1	0	1	0	X	X	7
Italy (Constantini / Mosaner)	0	1	0	1	0	0	X	X	2

Draw 5
Friday, 6 February, 10:05

Sheet C	1	2	3	4	5	6	7	8	Final
Italy (Constantini / Mosaner) 🔨	3	0	0	4	3	2	X	X	12
Switzerland (Schwaller-Hürlimann / Schwaller)	0	3	1	0	0	0	X	X	4

Draw 6
Friday, 6 February, 14:35

Sheet B	1	2	3	4	5	6	7	8	Final
Italy (Constantini / Mosaner)	3	1	0	0	2	0	0	1	7
Estonia (Kaldvee / Lill) 🔨	0	0	1	1	0	1	1	0	4

Draw 8
Saturday, 7 February, 14:35

Sheet C	1	2	3	4	5	6	7	8	Final
Sweden (Wranå / Wranå)	0	2	1	0	3	0	3	X	9
Italy (Constantini / Mosaner) 🔨	1	0	0	1	0	2	0	X	4

Draw 9
Saturday, 7 February, 19:05

Sheet D	1	2	3	4	5	6	7	8	Final
Norway (Skaslien / Nedregotten) 🔨	2	0	1	0	1	1	0	0	5
Italy (Constantini / Mosaner)	0	1	0	2	0	0	2	1	6

Draw 11
Sunday, 8 February, 14:35

Sheet D	1	2	3	4	5	6	7	8	Final
Italy (Constantini / Mosaner)	0	3	2	2	1	0	X	X	8
Czech Republic (Zelingrová / Chabičovský) 🔨	1	0	0	0	0	1	X	X	2

Draw 12
Sunday, 8 February, 19:05

Sheet A	1	2	3	4	5	6	7	8	Final
Italy (Constantini / Mosaner) 🔨	2	0	1	0	0	3	0	0	6
Great Britain (Dodds / Mouat)	0	3	0	1	1	0	3	1	9

Draw 13
Monday, 9 February, 10:05

Sheet B	1	2	3	4	5	6	7	8	Final
United States (Thiesse / Dropkin) 🔨	1	0	0	1	0	2	2	0	6
Italy (Constantini / Mosaner)	0	1	1	0	4	0	0	1	7

Semifinal

Monday, 9 February, 18:05

Sheet D	1	2	3	4	5	6	7	8	Final
Italy (Constantini / Mosaner) 🔨	2	0	2	0	1	0	3	0	8
United States (Thiesse / Dropkin)	0	2	0	3	0	2	0	2	9

Bronze medal game

Tuesday, 10 February, 14:05

Sheet C	1	2	3	4	5	6	7	8	Final
Great Britain (Dodds / Mouat) 🔨	0	1	0	0	1	0	1	0	3
Italy (Constantini / Mosaner)	1	0	1	1	0	1	0	1	5

== Figure skating ==
In the 2025 World Figure Skating Championships in Boston, the United States, Italy secured two quota in each of the men's singles, one quota in each of the women's singles, two quota in each of the pair skating, and one quota in each of the ice dance. Furthermore, Italy qualified to the team event.

Athlete	Event	SP/SD		FP/FD		Total	
Athlete	Event	Points	Rank	Points	Rank	Points	Rank
Daniel Grassl	Men's singles	93.46	4 Q	170.25	8	263.71	9
Matteo Rizzo	Men's singles	84.30	16 Q	158.88	14	243.18	15
Lara Naki Gutmann	Women's singles	61.56	18 Q	134.19	12	195.75	15
Sara Conti; Niccolò Macii	Pairs	71.70	8 Q	131.49	6	203.19	6
Rebecca Ghilardi; Filippo Ambrosini	Pairs	69.08	10 Q	122.78	11	191.86	12
Charlène Guignard; Marco Fabbri	Ice dance	84.28	5 Q	125.30	4	209.58	4

Team event

Athlete	Event	Short program / Rhythm dance						Free skate / Free dance				Total	
Athlete	Event	Men's	Women's	Pairs	Ice dance	Total		Men's	Women's	Pairs	Ice dance	Total	
Athlete	Event	Points Team points	Points Team points	Points Team points	Points Team points	Points	Rank	Points Team points	Points Team points	Points Team points	Points Team points	Points	Rank
Daniel Grassl (M) (SP); Matteo Rizzo (M) (FS); Lara Naki Gutmann (W); Sara Conti / Niccolò Macii (P); Charlène Guignard / Marco Fabbri (ID)	Team event	87.54; 6	71.62; 8	76.65; 8	83.54; 6	28	3 Q	179.62; 8	126.94; 7	136.61; 8	124.22; 9	60	3rd place, bronze medalist(s)

== Freestyle skiing ==
Italy can qualify an athlete in each event (five male and five female) through their status as host if they meet eligibility requirements. So far they have athletes for six of ten events (big air and slopestyle are grouped as one for qualifying).

Moguls

Athlete	Event	Qualification								Final							
Athlete	Event	Run 1				Run 2				Run 1				Run 2			Rank
Athlete	Event	Time	Points	Total	Rank	Time	Points	Total	Rank	Time	Points	Total	Rank	Time	Points	Total	Rank
Manuela Passaretta	Women's moguls	DNS				DNS				Did not advance							

Dual moguls

Athlete	Event	1/16 Final	1/8 Final	Quarterfinal	Semifinal	Final / BM	
Athlete	Event	Opposition Result	Opposition Result	Opposition Result	Opposition Result	Opposition Result	Rank
Manuela Passaretta	Dual moguls	Giaccio (USA); L DNF–35	Did not advance				29

Park & Pipe

Athlete	Event	Qualification					Final				
Athlete	Event	Run 1	Run 2	Run 3	Best	Rank	Run 1	Run 2	Run 3	Best	Rank
Miro Tabanelli	Men's big air	91.00	21.25	DNI	112.25	26	Did not advance				
Miro Tabanelli	Men's slopestyle	35.36	51.93	—N/a	51.93	17	Did not advance				
Maria Gasslitter	Women's big air	78.00	78.00	DNI	78.00	10 Q	78.00	81.25	DNI	159.25	9
Maria Gasslitter	Women's slopestyle	54.66	51.03	—N/a	54.66	12 Q	50.33	52.45	26.53	52.45	10
Flora Tabanelli	Women's big air	81.50	37.00	80.00	81.50	6 Q	90.00	84.00	94.25	178.25	3rd place, bronze medalist(s)

Ski cross

Athlete	Event	Seeding		1/8 final	Quarterfinal	Semifinal	Final	
Athlete	Event	Time	Rank	Position	Position	Position	Position	Rank
Simone Deromedis	Men's ski cross	1:07.55	9 Q	1 Q	1 Q	1 Q	1	1st place, gold medalist(s)
Federico Tomasoni	Men's ski cross	1:08.01	17 Q	2 Q	2 Q	2 Q	2	2nd place, silver medalist(s)
Edoardo Zorzi	Men's ski cross	1:08.34	25 Q	3	Did not advance			24
Dominik Zuech	Men's ski cross	1:07.54	8 Q	2 Q	3	Did not advance		9
Andrea Chesi	Women's ski cross	1:16.61	25 Q	3	Did not advance			23
Jole Galli	Women's ski cross	1:13.53	10 Q	1 Q	2 Q	3 FB	DNF	8

== Ice hockey ==
Italy qualified 25 male and 23 female competitors in hockey, for a total of 48 athletes.

Summary

Key:

- OT – Overtime
- GWS – Match decided by penalty-shootout

Team	Event	Group stage					Qualification playoff	Quarterfinal	Semifinal	Final / BM	
Team	Event	Opposition Score	Opposition Score	Opposition Score	Opposition Score	Rank	Opposition Score	Opposition Score	Opposition Score	Opposition Score	Rank
Italy men's	Men's tournament	Sweden; L 5–2	Slovakia; L 2–3	Finland; L 0–11	—N/a	4 Q	Switzerland; L 0–3	Did not advance			12
Italy women's	Women's tournament	France; W 4–1	Sweden; L 1–6	Japan; W 3–2	Germany; L 1–2	3 Q	—N/a	United States; L 0–6	Did not advance		8

=== Men's tournament ===
Italy men's national ice hockey team qualified a team of 25 players as host.

Roster

The first six players of Italy's roster were announced on 16 June 2025. The remainder of the roster was named on 20 January 2026. The host nation was the only team in the tournament with no current National Hockey League (NHL) players on the roster, with goaltender and Anaheim Ducks prospect Damian Clara the only player signed to an NHL team. On 11 February, Thomas Larkin was named Italy's captain, with Luca Frigo, Diego Kostner, Giovanni Morini, and Alex Trivellato named alternate captains.

Head coach: (Finland) Jukka Jalonen

No.	Pos.	Name	Height	Weight	Birthdate	Team
6	D	Jason Seed	1.85 m (6 ft 1 in)	88 kg (194 lb)	27 January 1992 (aged 34)	(Italy) HC Bolzano
7	F	Alessandro Segafredo	1.85 m (6 ft 1 in)	90 kg (198 lb)	15 September 2004 (aged 21)	(Switzerland) GCK Lions
9	F	Daniel Mantenuto	1.78 m (5 ft 10 in)	81 kg (179 lb)	18 October 1997 (aged 28)	(Italy) HC Bolzano
10	F	Dustin Gazley	1.73 m (5 ft 8 in)	76 kg (168 lb)	3 October 1988 (aged 37)	(Italy) HC Bolzano
11	F	Marco Zanetti	1.75 m (5 ft 9 in)	72 kg (159 lb)	12 March 2002 (aged 23)	(Switzerland) HC Lugano
13	F	Matt Bradley	1.83 m (6 ft 0 in)	92 kg (203 lb)	22 January 1997 (aged 29)	(Italy) HC Bolzano
18	F	Nick Saracino	1.83 m (6 ft 0 in)	88 kg (194 lb)	20 February 1992 (aged 33)	(Italy) HC Pustertal Wölfe
19	F	Alex Petan	1.75 m (5 ft 9 in)	82 kg (181 lb)	2 May 1992 (aged 33)	(Slovenia) HK Olimpija
20	G	Damian Clara	2.01 m (6 ft 7 in)	97 kg (214 lb)	13 January 2005 (aged 21)	(Sweden) Brynäs IF
21	D	Daniel Glira	1.85 m (6 ft 1 in)	87 kg (192 lb)	25 March 1994 (aged 31)	(Italy) HC Pustertal Wölfe
22	F	Diego Kostner – A	1.83 m (6 ft 0 in)	86 kg (190 lb)	5 August 1992 (aged 33)	(Switzerland) HC Ambrì-Piotta
23	F	Giovanni Morini – A	1.88 m (6 ft 2 in)	90 kg (198 lb)	2 February 1995 (aged 31)	(Switzerland) HC Lugano
27	D	Thomas Larkin – C	1.96 m (6 ft 5 in)	100 kg (220 lb)	31 December 1990 (aged 35)	(Germany) Schwenninger Wild Wings
34	F	Tommy Purdeller	1.80 m (5 ft 11 in)	88 kg (194 lb)	13 April 2004 (aged 21)	(Italy) HC Pustertal Wölfe
35	G	Davide Fadani	1.83 m (6 ft 0 in)	78 kg (172 lb)	3 February 2001 (aged 25)	(Switzerland) EHC Kloten
36	F	Cristiano DiGiacinto	1.80 m (5 ft 11 in)	88 kg (194 lb)	10 January 1996 (aged 30)	(Italy) HC Bolzano
37	D	Phil Pietroniro	1.85 m (6 ft 1 in)	90 kg (198 lb)	27 May 1994 (aged 31)	(Czech Republic) Rytíři Kladno
53	D	Alex Trivellato – A	1.88 m (6 ft 2 in)	90 kg (198 lb)	5 January 1993 (aged 33)	(Germany) Schwenninger Wild Wings
55	D	Luca Zanatta	1.85 m (6 ft 1 in)	90 kg (198 lb)	15 May 1991 (aged 34)	(Italy) HC Pustertal Wölfe
59	G	Gianluca Vallini	1.85 m (6 ft 1 in)	85 kg (187 lb)	27 October 1993 (aged 32)	(Italy) HC Bolzano
67	F	Mats Frycklund	1.88 m (6 ft 2 in)	95 kg (209 lb)	4 May 1993 (aged 32)	(Italy) HC Pustertal Wölfe
77	D	Gregory di Tomaso	1.85 m (6 ft 1 in)	85 kg (187 lb)	12 March 1996 (aged 29)	(Italy) HC Pustertal Wölfe
88	F	Tommaso de Luca	1.83 m (6 ft 0 in)	85 kg (187 lb)	29 December 2004 (aged 21)	(Switzerland) HC Ambrì-Piotta
90	D	Dylan di Perna	1.88 m (6 ft 2 in)	98 kg (216 lb)	26 April 1996 (aged 29)	(Italy) HC Bolzano
93	F	Luca Frigo – A	1.83 m (6 ft 0 in)	90 kg (198 lb)	30 May 1993 (aged 32)	(Italy) HC Bolzano

Group play

Pos	Team	Pld	W	OTW	OTL	L	GF	GA	GD	Pts	Qualification
1	Slovakia	3	2	0	0	1	10	8	+2	6 (Note: Head-to-head points: 3 each. Head-to-head goal difference: Slovakia +1; Finland 0; Sweden −1.)	Advance to quarterfinals
2	Finland	3	2	0	0	1	16	5	+11	6	Advance to quarterfinals
3	Sweden	3	2	0	0	1	11	9	+2	6	Advance to qualification playoffs
4	Italy (H)	3	0	0	0	3	4	19	−15	0	Advance to qualification playoffs

Source: IIHF
Rules for classification: Tiebreak criteria
(H) Host
Notes:

11 February 2026; 21:10	Sweden	5–2 (2–1, 1–1, 2–0)	Italy	PalaItalia, Milan; Attendance: 11,251

Game reference

Filip Gustavsson
Goalies
Damian Clara
Davide Fadani
Referees:
(Czech Republic) Jan Hribik
(Canada) Dan O'Rourke
Linesmen:
(Canada) David Brisebois
(Finland) Onni Hautamäki

	0–1	04:14 – Frigo
Landeskog (Zibanejad, Karlsson) (PP)– 09:06	1–1
Forsling (Raymond, Bratt) – 17:53	2–1
	2–2	20:37 – Bradley (Gazley, Larkin)
Nylander (Dahlin, Kempe) – 36:46	3–2
Zibanejad (Dahlin, Rakell) – 55:42	4–2
Hedman (Forsling) (EN) – 57:11	5–2

2 min
Penalties
2 min
60
Shots
22

13 February 2026; 12:10	Italy	2–3 (0–0, 1–2, 1–1)	Slovakia	Fiera Milano, Milan; Attendance: 3,986

Game reference

Davide Fadani
Damian Clara
Goalies
Stanislav Škorvánek
Referees:
(United States) Brian Pochmara
(Germany) André Schrader
Linesmen:
(United States) Nick Briganti
(United States) Jonny Murray

	0–1	23:51 – Hudáček (Slafkovský, Dvorský) (PP)
	0–2	33:45 – Sukeľ (Liška, Cingel)
Bradley (Pietroniro, Gazley) (PP) – 37:06	1–2
	1–3	51:54 – Ružička (Regenda, Gernát)
Gazley (Larkin, Pietroniro) (EA) – 56:25	2–3

12 min
Penalties
12 min
22
Shots
38

14 February 2026; 16:40	Finland	11–0 (3–0, 3–0, 5–0)	Italy	PalaItalia, Milan; Attendance: 11,508

Game reference

Juuse Saros
Goalies
Damian Clara
Davide Fadani
Referees:
(Sweden) Christopher Holm
(Canada) Wes McCauley
Linesmen:
(Denmark) Albert Ankerstjerne
(Canada) Matt MacPherson

Aho (Rantanen, Lehkonen) – 06:49	1–0
Granlund (Rantanen, Heiskanen) (PP) – 09:31	2–0
Kakko (Mikkola, Ristolainen) – 10:18	3–0
Kiviranta (Mikkola, Ristolainen) – 24:04	4–0
Kakko (Luostarinen) – 27:39	5–0
Granlund (Kakko, Luostarinen) – 37:36	6–0
Heiskanen (Rantanen, Aho) (PP) – 41:01	7–0
Lehkonen (Teräväinen) – 41:34	8–0
Aho (Lehkonen, Jokiharju) – 43:43	9–0
Armia (Haula) – 53:26	10–0
Kiviranta (Armia, Haula) – 57:13	11–0

0 min
Penalties
8 min
62
Shots
15

Qualification play-offs

17 February 2026; 12:10	Switzerland	3–0 (2–0, 0–0, 1–0)	Italy	Fiera Milano, Milan; Attendance: 3,827

Game reference

Leonardo Genoni
Goalies
Damian Clara
Referees:
(Czech Republic) Jan Hribik
(Germany) André Schrader
Linesmen:
(Czech Republic) Libor Suchánek
(Canada) Tarrington Wyonzek

Kurashev (Hischier, Meier) – 01:19	1–0
Josi (Andrighetto, Hischier) (PP) – 10:25	2–0
Hischier (Riat, Meier) (PP) – 45:53	3–0

6 min
Penalties
12 min
51
Shots
20

=== Women's tournament ===
The Italy women's national ice hockey team qualified as host.

Roster

The roster was named on 20 January 2026.

Head coach: (Canada) Eric Bouchard

No.	Pos.	Name	Height	Weight	Birthdate	Team
1	G	Gabriella Durante	1.81 m (5 ft 11 in)	69 kg (152 lb)	20 January 2001 (aged 25)	(Italy) Real Torino
2	D	Amie Varano	1.65 m (5 ft 5 in)	65 kg (143 lb)	18 June 1994 (aged 31)	(Sweden) Malmö Redhawks
3	D	Manuela Heidenberger	1.71 m (5 ft 7 in)	66 kg (146 lb)	15 September 2007 (aged 18)	(Finland) HPK Hämeenlinna
4	F	Carola Saletta	1.74 m (5 ft 9 in)	66 kg (146 lb)	11 February 1993 (aged 32)	(Switzerland) HC Fribourg-Gottéron
8	F	Anna Caumo	1.67 m (5 ft 6 in)	67 kg (148 lb)	16 February 2002 (aged 23)	(Italy) HC Pustertal Wölfe
10	F	Aurora Abatangelo	1.65 m (5 ft 5 in)	69 kg (152 lb)	14 December 2002 (aged 23)	(Switzerland) HC Davos
11	F	Justine Reyes	1.73 m (5 ft 8 in)	72 kg (159 lb)	14 February 1997 (aged 28)	(Sweden) Modo Hockey
12	F	Rebecca Roccella	1.62 m (5 ft 4 in)	60 kg (130 lb)	3 April 2001 (aged 24)	(Switzerland) HC Davos
13	D	Laura Lobis	1.68 m (5 ft 6 in)	72 kg (159 lb)	25 March 2006 (aged 19)	(Italy) SV Kaltern
14	F	Eleonora Bonafini	1.74 m (5 ft 9 in)	74 kg (163 lb)	17 February 1995 (aged 30)	(Italy) Bolzano Eagles
15	D	Greta Niccolai	1.62 m (5 ft 4 in)	60 kg (130 lb)	10 May 2001 (aged 24)	(Switzerland) HC Davos
17	F	Matilde Fantin	1.74 m (5 ft 9 in)	74 kg (163 lb)	1 January 2007 (aged 19)	(United States) Penn State Nittany Lions
18	D	Franziska Stocker	1.72 m (5 ft 8 in)	75 kg (165 lb)	16 December 1997 (aged 28)	(Sweden) Södertälje SK
19	F	Kristin Della Rovere	1.76 m (5 ft 9 in)	74 kg (163 lb)	30 November 2000 (aged 25)	(Canada) Toronto Sceptres
21	F	Marta Mazzocchi	1.60 m (5 ft 3 in)	61 kg (134 lb)	23 August 2004 (aged 21)	(Italy) Bolzano Eagles
22	F	Sara Kaneppele	1.74 m (5 ft 9 in)	74 kg (163 lb)	30 June 2003 (aged 22)	(Italy) Bolzano Eagles
25	G	Martina Fedel	1.65 m (5 ft 5 in)	62 kg (137 lb)	20 December 2002 (aged 23)	(Canada) University of Guelph
27	D	Kristen Guerriero	1.72 m (5 ft 8 in)	77 kg (170 lb)	27 May 1999 (aged 26)	(Italy) Bolzano Eagles
55	D	Jacquie Pierri	1.63 m (5 ft 4 in)	65 kg (143 lb)	11 June 1990 (aged 35)	(Italy) Bolzano Eagles
66	G	Margherita Ostoni	1.68 m (5 ft 6 in)	68 kg (150 lb)	1 July 2006 (aged 19)	(Sweden) IF Björklöven
77	D	Laura Fortino – A	1.63 m (5 ft 4 in)	62 kg (137 lb)	30 January 1991 (aged 35)	(Italy) Real Torino
82	F	Kayla Tutino – A	1.65 m (5 ft 5 in)	62 kg (137 lb)	18 December 1992 (aged 33)	(Italy) Real Torino
93	D	Nadia Mattivi – C	1.77 m (5 ft 10 in)	78 kg (172 lb)	2 May 2000 (aged 25)	(Sweden) Luleå HF

Group play

Pos	Team	Pld	W	OTW	OTL	L	GF	GA	GD	Pts	Qualification
1	Sweden	4	4	0	0	0	18	2	+16	12	Quarter-finals
2	Germany	4	2	1	0	1	10	8	+2	8	Quarter-finals
3	Italy (H)	4	2	0	0	2	9	11	−2	6	Quarter-finals
4	Japan	4	1	0	0	3	7	14	−7	3	Eliminated
5	France	4	0	0	1	3	4	13	−9	1	Eliminated

Source: IIHF
Rules for classification: Tiebreakers
(H) Host

5 February 2026; 14:40 v	Italy	4–1 (1–1, 1–0, 2–0)	France	PalaItalia, Milan; Attendance: 9,356

Game reference

Martina Fedel
Goalies
Alice Philbert
Referees:
(United States) Kelly Cooke
(Canada) Elizabeth Mantha
Linesmen:
(United States) Jennifer Cameron
(Canada) Laura Gutauskas

	0–1	09:42 – De Serres (Rozier) (PP)
Tutino (Mattivi) – 10:42	1–1
Roccella (Della Rovere, Lobis) – 35:17	2–1
Fantin – 40:14	3–1
Della Rovere (Caumo) – 44:59	4–1

6 min
Penalties
6 min
46
Shots
15

7 February 2026; 14:40 v	Sweden	6–1 (1–0, 3–1, 2–0)	Italy	PalaItalia, Milan; Attendance: 10,727

Game reference

Ebba Svensson Träff
Goalies
Martina Fedel
Gabriella Durante
Referees:
(United States) Melissa Doyle
(Canada) Shauna Neary
Linesmen:
(Canada) Alexandra Clarke
(Czech Republic) Kristýna Hájková

Adolfsson (Thuvik, Hjalmarsson) – 09:50	1–0
Lundin (Raunio, Kjellbin) – 29:36	2–0
Hjalmarsson (Karlsson) – 31:47	3–0
	3–1	33:30 – Stocker
Olsson (Andersson, T. Johansson) – 34:39	4–1
T. Johansson (Ljungblom) – 46:53	5–1
T. Johansson (Olsson, Svensson) – 54:32	6–1

2 min
Penalties
4 min
47
Shots
19

9 February 2026; 12:10 v	Japan	2–3 (0–2, 1–0, 1–1)	Italy	Fiera Milano, Milan; Attendance: 3,769

Game reference

Miyuu Masuhara
Goalies
Gabriella Durante
Referees:
(United States) Samantha Hiller
(Canada) Michelle McKenna
Linesmen:
(Czech Republic) Kristýna Hájková
(Canada) Erin Zach

	0–1	12:34 – Fantin (Lobis, Tutino)
	0–2	18:51 – Fantin (Mattivi, Fortino) (PP)
Ukita (Rio Noro) – 22:48	1–2
	1–3	40:37 – Della Rovere
Ak. Shiga (Sato, Ao. Shiga) – 51:01	2–3

4 min
Penalties
6 min
29
Shots
23

10 February 2026; 16:40 v	Italy	1–2 (0–0, 1–1, 0–1)	Germany	Fiera Milano, Milan; Attendance: 3,898

Game reference

Gabriella Durante
Goalies
Sandra Abstreiter
Referees:
(Sweden) Ida Henriksson
(Canada) Cianna Murray
Linesmen:
(United States) Jennifer Cameron
(Canada) Erin Zach

Reyes (Caumo, Della Rovere) – 20:21	1–0
	1–1	32:47 – Nix (Kluge, Gleißner)
	1–2	58:31 – Kluge (Jobst-Smith)

10 min
Penalties
8 min
24
Shots
24

Quarterfinals

13 February 2026; 21:10 v	United States	6–0 (1–0, 5–0, 0–0)	Italy	Fiera Milano, Milan; Attendance: 3,930

Game reference

Gwyneth Philips
Goalies
Gabriella Durante
Referees:
(Sweden) Ida Henriksson
(Canada) Shauna Neary
Linesmen:
(Sweden) Jessica Lundgren
(Canada) Erin Zach

Keller (Edwards, Carpenter) – 13:31	1–0
Coyne (Harvey, Winn) – 21:41	2–0
Coyne (Curl, Zumwinkle) – 24:51	3–0
Edwards (Keller, Janecke) – 25:17	4–0
Curl (Dunne, Stecklein) (SH) – 31:29	5–0
Bilka (Heise, Harvey) – 38:27	6–0

8 min
Penalties
12 min
51
Shots
6

== Luge ==
Men

Athlete	Event	Run 1		Run 2		Run 3		Run 4		Total	
Athlete	Event	Time	Rank	Time	Rank	Time	Rank	Time	Rank	Time	Rank
Leon Felderer	Singles	53.224	5	53.367	7	53.221	8	53.305	8	3:33.117	7
Dominik Fischnaller	Singles	53.085	3	53.039	3	52.949	3	53.052	3	3:32.125	3rd place, bronze medalist(s)
Alex Gufler	Singles	53.903	18	53.866	16	53.690	15	53.748	18	3:35.207	17
Simon Kainzwaldner; Emanuel Rieder	Doubles	52.499	3	52.587	1	—N/a				1:45.086	1st place, gold medalist(s)
Fabian Malleier; Ivan Nagler	Doubles	52.647	7	52.657	3	—N/a				1:45.304	7

Women

Athlete	Event	Run 1		Run 2		Run 3		Run 4		Total	
Athlete	Event	Time	Rank	Time	Rank	Time	Rank	Time	Rank	Time	Rank
Verena Hofer	Singles	52.861	3	52.882	4	52.977	5	52.925	7	3:31.645	4
Sandra Robatscher	Singles	52.886	6	52.915	5	53.026	7	52.905	3	3:31.732	5
Marion Oberhofer; Andrea Vötter	Doubles	53.102	1	53.182	1	—N/a				1:46.284	1st place, gold medalist(s)

Mixed team relay

Athlete	Event	Women's singles		Men's doubles		Men's singles		Women's doubles		Total	
Athlete	Event	Time	Rank	Time	Rank	Time	Rank	Time	Rank	Time	Rank
Verena Hofer; Emanuel Rieder / Simon Kainzwaldner; Dominik Fischnaller; Andrea Vötter / Marion Oberhofer	Team relay	55.830	4	55.332	3	55.088	4	56.271	3	3:42.521	3rd place, bronze medalist(s)

== Nordic combined ==
Italy qualified a minimum of one competitor as host.

Athlete	Event	Ski jumping			Cross-country		Total	
Athlete	Event	Distance	Points	Rank	Time	Rank	Time	Rank
Samuel Costa	Individual normal hill/10 km	95.0	112.1	22	31:00.0	9	32:22.0	13
Samuel Costa	Individual large hill/10 km	116.0	106.0	28	25:30.0	13	28:26.0	23
Aaron Kostner	Individual normal hill/10 km	91.0	106.8	27	31:35.2	14	33:18.2	16
Aaron Kostner	Individual large hill/10 km	120.0	110.8	27	25:19.0	10	27:56.0	18
Alessandro Pittin	Individual normal hill/10 km	88.0	95.8	33	31:12.8	11	33:39.8	19
Alessandro Pittin	Individual large hill/10 km	115.0	102.2	31	25:19.6	11	28:30.6	24
Samuel Costa; Aaron Kostner	Team sprint	114.0; 106.5	182.0	11	40:55.5	2	42:21.5	4

== Short-track speed skating ==
Italy qualified the maximum team size of ten short-track speed skaters (five per gender) after the conclusion of the 2025–26 ISU Short Track World Tour.

Men

Athlete	Event	Heat		Quarterfinal		Semifinal		Final	
Athlete	Event	Time	Rank	Time	Rank	Time	Rank	Time	Rank
Lorenzo Previtali	500 m	40.993	2 Q	40.847	3	Did not advance			
Thomas Nadalini	500 m	40.921	2 Q	40.619	3	Did not advance			
Pietro Sighel	500 m	40.942	2 Q	40.392	2 Q	1:07.239	5 FB	DNS	
Thomas Nadalini	1000 m	1:26.882	2 Q	1:34.487	4	Did not advance			
Pietro Sighel	1000 m	1:24.740	1 Q	PEN		Did not advance			
Luca Spechenhauser	1000 m	1:25.422	1 Q	1:25.260	3	Did not advance			
Thomas Nadalini	1500 m	—N/a		2:18.543	2 Q	PEN		Did not advance	
Pietro Sighel	1500 m	—N/a		3:09.757	5	Did not advance			
Luca Spechenhauser	1500 m	—N/a		2:12.485	1 Q	2:15.895	3 FB	2:34.359	10
Andrea Cassinelli; Thomas Nadalini; Lorenzo Previtali; Pietro Sighel; Luca Spechenhauser	5000 m relay	—N/a				6:54.454	2 FA	6:52.335	3rd place, bronze medalist(s)

Qualification legend: Q - Qualify based on position in heat; q - Qualify based on time in field; FA - Qualify to medal final; ADV A - Advanced to medal final on referee decision; FB - Qualify to consolation final
* - Athlete skated in a preliminary round but not the final.

Women

Athlete	Event	Heat		Quarterfinal		Semifinal		Final	
Athlete	Event	Time	Rank	Time	Rank	Time	Rank	Time	Rank
Chiara Betti	500 m	43.163	2 Q	42.279	4	Did not advance			
Arianna Fontana	500 m	42.668	2 Q	41.679	2 Q	41.521	2 FA	42.294	2nd place, silver medalist(s)
Arianna Sighel	500 m	53.960	3	Did not advance					
Chiara Betti	1000 m	1:27.835	3 q	1:29.645	4	Did not advance			
Elisa Confortola	1000 m	1:28.300	1 Q	1:28.659	2 Q	1:28.208	2 FB	1:31.099	6
Arianna Fontana	1000 m	1:30.638	1 Q	1:28.613	1 Q	1:28.166	2 FA	1:28.745	4
Elisa Confortola	1500 m	—N/a		2:27.605	2 Q	2:55.438	6 ADV FB	2:35.836	3
Arianna Fontana	1500 m	—N/a		2:25.024	2 Q	2:29.512	2 FA	2:32.783	5
Arianna Sighel	1500 m	—N/a		2:29.922	3 Q	2:21.120	3 q FA	2:33.052	6
Chiara Betti; Elisa Confortola; Arianna Fontana; Arianna Sighel	3000 m relay	—N/a				4:06.550	2 FA	4:04.107	2nd place, silver medalist(s)

Qualification legend: Q - Qualify based on position in heat; q - Qualify based on time in field; FA - Qualify to medal final; FB - Qualify to consolation final; ADV - Advanced on referee decision

Mixed

Athlete	Event	Quarterfinal		Semifinal		Final	
Athlete	Event	Time	Rank	Time	Rank	Time	Rank
Chiara Betti; Elisa Confortola; Arianna Fontana; Thomas Nadalini; Pietro Sighel; Luca Spechenhauser	2000 m relay	2.36.581	2 Q	2.37.482	1 FA	2.39.019	1st place, gold medalist(s)

Qualification legend: Q - Qualify based on position in heat; q - Qualify based on time in field; FA - Qualify to medal final; FB - Qualify to consolation final
* - Athlete skated in a preliminary round but not the final.

== Skeleton ==
Athlete	Event	Run 1		Run 2		Run 3		Run 4		Total	
Athlete	Event	Time	Rank	Time	Rank	Time	Rank	Time	Rank	Time	Rank
Amedeo Bagnis	Men's	56.37	3	56.38	6	55.92	=3	56.07	4	3:44.74	5
Mattia Gaspari	Men's	56.73	10	56.72	13	56.79	14	56.55	14	3:46.79	13
Alessandra Fumagalli	Women's	58.02	14	57.93	13	58.22	15	58.11	13	3:52.28	14
Valentina Margaglio	Women's	58.20	16	58.07	15	58.06 SR	11	58.58	19	3:52.91	16
Amedeo Bagnis; Alessandra Fumagalli	Mixed team	1:01.6	6	58.98	3	—N/a				2:00.04	6
Mattia Gaspari; Valentina Margaglio	Mixed team	1:02.24	15	59.72	12	—N/a				2:01.96	14

== Ski jumping ==
Italy qualified a minimum of one male and one female athlete as host.

Men

Athlete	Event	First round			Final round			Total	
Athlete	Event	Distance	Points	Rank	Distance	Points	Rank	Points	Rank
Giovanni Bresadola	Normal hill	102.5	126.8	15 Q	102.0	125.9	20	252.7	19
Giovanni Bresadola	Large hill	130.5	64.5	26 Q	123.5	51.9	28	231.1	29
Francesco Cecon	Normal hill	98	113.8	41	Did not advance				
Francesco Cecon	Large hill	115.0	86.8	47	Did not advance				
Alex Insam	Normal hill	99.5	119.4	37	Did not advance				
Alex Insam	Large hill	128.0	115.8	35	Did not advance				

Athlete	Event	First round			Second round			Final round			Total	
Athlete	Event	Distance	Points	Rank	Distance	Points	Rank	Distance	Points	Rank	Points	Rank
Giovanni Bresadola; Alex Insam	Super team large hill	263.5	255.8	9 Q	254.0	254.3	9	Did not advance				

Women

Athlete	Event	First round			Final round			Total	
Athlete	Event	Distance	Points	Rank	Distance	Points	Rank	Points	Rank
Martina Ambrosi	Normal hill	85.0	90.8	46	Did not advance				
Martina Ambrosi	Large hill	Did not start							
Jessica Malsiner	Normal hill	91.0	104.3	39	Did not advance				
Jessica Malsiner	Large hill	113.0	93.9	32	Did not advance				
Annika Sieff	Normal hill	96.0	114.1	22	99.0	112.5	18	226.6	19
Annika Sieff	Large hill	118.0	119.2	11	119.5	120.1	14	239.3	13
Martina Zanitzer	Normal hill	92.0	106.0	36	Did not advance				
Martina Zanitzer	Large hill	122.0	107.0	25	115.0	106.1	23	213.1	25

Mixed

Athlete	Event	First round			Final			Total	
Athlete	Event	Distance	Points	Rank	Distance	Points	Rank	Points	Rank
Annika Sieff; Alex Insam; Martina Zanitzer; Giovanni Bresadola	Mixed team	372.5	451.5	10	Did not advance				

== Ski mountaineering ==
Italy qualified one female and one male ski mountaineer through their status as host. Following the completion of the 2025 ISMF World Championships, Italy qualified further one female ski mountaineer.

Athlete	Event	Heat		Semifinal		Final	
Athlete	Event	Time	Rank	Time	Rank	Time	Rank
Michele Boscacci	Men's sprint	2:50.79	5	Did not advance			
Alba De Silvestro	Women's sprint	3:15.48	4 LL	3:17.01	5	Did not advance	
Giulia Murada	Women's sprint	3:17.63	1 Q	3:12.43	3 LL	3:15.46	5
Michele Boscacci; Alba De Silvestro	Mixed relay	—N/a				27:57.64	5

== Snowboarding ==
Italy can qualify an athlete in each event (four male and four female) through their status as host if they meet eligibility requirements. So far they have they have athletes for seven of eight events (big air and slopestyle are grouped as one for qualifying).

Alpine
Men

Athlete	Event	Qualification		Round of 16	Quarterfinal	Semifinal	Final	
Athlete	Event	Time	Rank	Opposition Time	Opposition Time	Opposition Time	Opposition Time	Rank
Maurizio Bormolini	Parallel giant slalom	1:27.47	14 Q	Karl (AUT); L +0.03	Did not advance			
Mirko Felicetti	Parallel giant slalom	1:27.37	10 Q	Caviezel (SUI); W	Mastnak (SLO); L DNF	Did not advance		
Roland Fischnaller	Parallel giant slalom	1:25.13	1 Q	Marguč (SLO); W	Kim (KOR); L DNF	Did not advance		
Aaron March	Parallel giant slalom	1:26.08	2 Q	Mastnak (SLO); L +0.06	Did not advance			

Women

Athlete	Event	Qualification		Round of 16	Quarterfinal	Semifinal	Final	
Athlete	Event	Time	Rank	Opposition Time	Opposition Time	Opposition Time	Opposition Time	Rank
Elisa Caffont	Parallel giant slalom	1:33.38	6 Q	Zogg (SUI); W	Miki (JPN); W	Maděrová (CZE); L +0.45	Dalmasso (ITA); L +0.11	4
Jasmin Coratti	Parallel giant slalom	1:35.00	13 Q	Dalmasso (ITA); L +0.06	Did not advance			
Lucia Dalmasso	Parallel giant slalom	1:33.06	4 Q	Coratti (ITA); W	Król-Walas (POL); W	Payer (AUT); L +0.23	Caffont (ITA); W	3rd place, bronze medalist(s)
Sofia Valle	Parallel giant slalom	1:40.61	32	Did not advance				

Cross

Athlete	Event	Seeding		1/8 final	Quarterfinal	Semifinal	Final	
Athlete	Event	Time	Rank	Position	Position	Position	Position	Rank
Filippo Ferrari	Men's	1:09.69	27	4	Did not advance			30
Lorenzo Sommariva	Men's	1:08.52	6	2 Q	1 Q	4 FB	4	8
Omar Visintin	Men's	1:09.87	20	3	Did not advance			20
Lisa Francesia Boirai	Women's	1:15.99	20	3	Did not advance			21
Sofia Groblechner	Women's	1:15.65	18	2 Q	4	Did not advance		16
Michela Moioli	Women's	1:13.63	6	1 Q	1 Q	1 FA	3	3rd place, bronze medalist(s)
Omar Visintin; Sofia Groblechner	Mixed team	—N/a			3	Did not advance		12
Lorenzo Sommariva; Michela Moioli	Mixed team	—N/a			1 Q	1 Q	2	2nd place, silver medalist(s)

Park & Pipe

Athlete	Event	Qualification					Final				
Athlete	Event	Run 1	Run 2	Run 3	Best	Rank	Run 1	Run 2	Run 3	Best	Rank
Ian Matteoli	Men's big air	93.75	77.75	80.75	174.50	2 Q	26.25	80.25	82.25	162.50	5
Ian Matteoli	Men's slopestyle	43.81	58.90	—N/a	58.90	17	Did not advance				
Louie Vito	Men's halfpipe	58.75	DNI	—N/a	58.75	18	Did not advance				
Marilu Poluzzi	Women's big air	59.00	22.25	72.25	131.25	24	Did not advance				
Marilu Poluzzi	Women's slopestyle	21.25	37.85	—N/a	37.85	28	Did not advance				

== Speed skating ==
Italy qualified fourteen speed skaters (eight men and six women) through performances at the 2025-26 ISU Speed Skating World Cup.

Men

Athlete	Event	Race	
Athlete	Event	Time	Rank
Jeffrey Rosanelli	500 m	34.82	17
Daniele Di Stefano	1000 m	1:08.17	7
Francesco Betti	1000 m	1:10.18	26
Daniele Di Stefano	1500 m	1:43.41	5
Davide Ghiotto	5000 m	6:09.57	4
Riccardo Lorello	5000 m	6:09.22	3rd place, bronze medalist(s)
Michele Malfatti	5000 m	6:17.95	12
Davide Ghiotto	10,000 m	12:46.72	6
Riccardo Lorello	10,000 m	12.56.22	8

Women

Athlete	Event	Race	
Athlete	Event	Time	Rank
Serena Pergher	500 m	37.30	4
Maybritt Vigl	500 m	38.66	24
Maybritt Vigl	1000 m	1:17.151	25
Francesca Lollobrigida	1500 m	1:56.51	13
Francesca Lollobrigida	3000 m	3:54.28	1st place, gold medalist(s)
Francesca Lollobrigida	5000 m	6:46.17	1st place, gold medalist(s)

Mass start

Athlete	Event	Semifinal			Final		
Athlete	Event	Points	Time	Rank	Points	Time	Rank
Daniele Di Stefano	Men's	3	8:05.12	9	Did not advance		
Andrea Giovannini	Men's	13	7:51.81	4 Q	21	8:04.42	3rd place, bronze medalist(s)
Francesca Lollobrigida	Women's	45	8:44.02	2 Q	10	8:35.95	4

Team pursuit

Athlete	Event	Quarterfinal		Semifinal		Final	
Athlete	Event	Opposition Time	Rank	Opposition Time	Rank	Opposition Time	Rank
Davide Ghiotto; Andrea Giovannini; Michele Malfatti	Men's	United States; 3:38.40	1 Q	Netherlands; 3:38.88	1 FA	United States; 3:39.20	1st place, gold medalist(s)

== See also ==
- Italy at the 2024 Summer Olympics
- Italy at the 2026 Winter Paralympics
- Italian sportswomen multiple medalists at Olympics and World Championships
