= Freestyle skiing at the 2026 Winter Olympics – Men's ski cross =

Men's ski cross at the XXV Olympic Winter Games
- Freestyle skiing
- Venue: Livigno Snow Park , Valtellina
- Date: 21 February 2026

Medalists
| 1st place, gold medalist(s) | | Simone Deromedis | Italy |
| 2nd place, silver medalist(s) | | Federico Tomasoni | Italy |
| 3rd place, bronze medalist(s) | | Alex Fiva | Switzerland |

The men's ski cross competition in freestyle skiing at the 2026 Winter Olympics was held on 21 February at the Livigno Snow Park in Valtellina. Simone Deromedis of Italy won the event, his teammate Federico Tomasoni won the silver medal, and Alex Fiva of Switzerland won bronze. Deromedis and Tomasoni won their first Olympic medals.

== Background ==
The defending champion, Ryan Regez, qualified for the event, as did the 2022 silver medalist, Alex Fiva. The bronze medalist, Sergey Ridzik, has not competed internationally since the start of the Russian invasion of Ukraine. Reece Howden was leading the 2025–26 FIS Freestyle Ski World Cup standings in ski cross before the Olympics. Regez was the 2025 World champion.

== Results ==
=== Seeding run ===
| Rank | Bib | Name | Country | Time | Difference |
|---|---|---|---|---|---|
| 1 | 10 | Reece Howden | Canada | 1:06.13 | — |
| 2 | 27 | Satoshi Furuno | Japan | 1:07.12 | +0.99 |
| 3 | 8 | Ryan Regez | Switzerland | 1:07.18 | +1.05 |
| 4 | 13 | Florian Wilmsmann | Germany | 1:07.27 | +1.14 |
| 5 | 6 | Melvin Tchiknavorian | France | 1:07.34 | +1.21 |
| 6 | 11 | Jared Schmidt | Canada | 1:07.37 | +1.24 |
| 7 | 9 | Kevin Drury | Canada | 1:07.53 | +1.40 |
| 8 | 17 | Dominik Zuech | Italy | 1:07.54 | +1.41 |
| 9 | 15 | Simone Deromedis | Italy | 1:07.55 | +1.42 |
| 10 | 14 | David Mobärg | Sweden | 1:07.56 | +1.43 |
| 11 | 12 | Alex Fiva | Switzerland | 1:07.56 | +1.43 |
| 12 | 21 | Terence Tchiknavorian | France | 1:07.74 | +1.61 |
| 13 | 22 | Romain Detraz | Switzerland | 1:07.78 | +1.65 |
| 14 | 23 | Florian Fischer | Germany | 1:07.89 | +1.76 |
| 15 | 7 | Johannes Aujesky | Austria | 1:07.89 | +1.76 |
| 16 | 2 | Tobias Baur | Switzerland | 1:07.89 | +1.76 |
| 17 | 25 | Federico Tomasoni | Italy | 1:08.01 | +1.88 |
| 18 | 29 | Nicolas Lussnig | Austria | 1:08.04 | +1.91 |
| 19 | 1 | Ryō Sugai | Japan | 1:08.13 | +2.00 |
| 20 | 20 | Cornel Renn | Germany | 1:08.14 | +2.01 |
| 21 | 16 | Youri Duplessis Kergomard | France | 1:08.18 | +2.05 |
| 22 | 18 | Erik Mobärg | Sweden | 1:08.19 | +2.06 |
| 23 | 4 | Evan Klufts | France | 1:08.29 | +2.16 |
| 24 | 3 | Adam Kappacher | Austria | 1:08.31 | +2.18 |
| 25 | 19 | Edoardo Zorzi | Italy | 1:08.34 | +2.21 |
| 26 | 5 | Tim Hronek | Germany | 1:08.68 | +2.55 |
| 27 | 30 | Daniel Paulus | Czech Republic | 1:08.84 | +2.71 |
| 28 | 24 | Oliver Davies | Great Britain | 1:09.33 | +3.20 |
| 29 | 26 | Gavin Rowell | Canada | 1:09.46 | +3.33 |
| 30 | 28 | Christoph Danksagmüller | Austria | 1:09.48 | +3.35 |
| 31 | 31 | Ryuto Kobayashi | Japan | 1:10.15 | +4.02 |

=== Elimination round ===
==== 1/8 finals ====
Heat 1

| Rank | Bib | Name | Country | Notes |
|---|---|---|---|---|
| 1 | 1 | Reece Howden | Canada | Q |
| 2 | 17 | Federico Tomasoni | Italy | Q |
| 3 | 16 | Tobias Baur | Switzerland | |

Heat 2

| Rank | Bib | Name | Country | Notes |
|---|---|---|---|---|
| 1 | 9 | Simone Deromedis | Italy | Q |
| 2 | 8 | Dominik Zuech | Italy | Q |
| 3 | 25 | Edoardo Zorzi | Italy | |
| 4 | 24 | Adam Kappacher | Austria | |

Heat 3

| Rank | Bib | Name | Country | Notes |
|---|---|---|---|---|
| 1 | 21 | Youri Duplessis Kergomard | France | Q |
| 2 | 12 | Terence Tchiknavorian | France | Q |
| 3 | 5 | Melvin Tchiknavorian | France | |
| 4 | 28 | Oliver Davies | Great Britain | |

Heat 4

| Rank | Bib | Name | Country | Notes |
|---|---|---|---|---|
| 1 | 4 | Florian Wilmsmann | Germany | Q |
| 2 | 20 | Cornel Renn | Germany | Q |
| 3 | 13 | Romain Detraz | Switzerland | |
| 4 | 29 | Gavin Rowell | Canada | |

Heat 5

| Rank | Bib | Name | Country | Notes |
|---|---|---|---|---|
| 1 | 3 | Ryan Regez | Switzerland | Q |
| 2 | 14 | Florian Fischer | Germany | Q |
| 3 | 19 | Ryō Sugai | Japan | |
| 4 | 30 | Christoph Danksagmüller | Austria | |

Heat 6

| Rank | Bib | Name | Country | Notes |
|---|---|---|---|---|
| 1 | 11 | Alex Fiva | Switzerland | Q |
| 2 | 27 | Daniel Paulus | Czech Republic | Q |
| 3 | 22 | Erik Mobärg | Sweden | DNF |
| 4 | 6 | Jared Schmidt | Canada | RAL |

Heat 7

| Rank | Bib | Name | Country | Notes |
|---|---|---|---|---|
| 1 | 26 | Tim Hronek | Germany | Q |
| 2 | 7 | Kevin Drury | Canada | Q |
| 3 | 10 | David Mobärg | Sweden | DNF |
| 4 | 23 | Evan Klufts | France | DNF |

Heat 8

| Rank | Bib | Name | Country | Notes |
|---|---|---|---|---|
| 1 | 2 | Satoshi Furuno | Japan | Q |
| 2 | 18 | Nicolas Lussnig | Austria | Q |
| 3 | 15 | Johannes Aujesky | Austria | |
| 4 | 31 | Ryuto Kobayashi | Japan | |

==== Quarterfinals ====
Heat 1

| Rank | Bib | Name | Country | Notes |
|---|---|---|---|---|
| 1 | 9 | Simone Deromedis | Italy | Q |
| 2 | 17 | Federico Tomasoni | Italy | Q |
| 3 | 8 | Dominik Zuech | Italy | |
| 4 | 1 | Reece Howden | Canada | |

Heat 2

| Rank | Bib | Name | Country | Notes |
|---|---|---|---|---|
| 1 | 4 | Florian Wilmsmann | Germany | Q |
| 2 | 12 | Terence Tchiknavorian | France | Q |
| 3 | 20 | Cornel Renn | Germany | |
| 4 | 21 | Youri Duplessis Kergomard | France | |

Heat 3

| Rank | Bib | Name | Country | Notes |
|---|---|---|---|---|
| 1 | 11 | Alex Fiva | Switzerland | Q |
| 2 | 3 | Ryan Regez | Switzerland | Q |
| 3 | 14 | Florian Fischer | Germany | |
| 4 | 27 | Daniel Paulus | Czech Republic | |

Heat 4

| Rank | Bib | Name | Country | Notes |
|---|---|---|---|---|
| 1 | 2 | Satoshi Furuno | Japan | Q |
| 2 | 26 | Tim Hronek | Germany | Q |
| 3 | 18 | Nicolas Lussnig | Austria | |
| 4 | 7 | Kevin Drury | Canada | |

==== Semifinals ====
Heat 1

| Rank | Bib | Name | Country | Notes |
|---|---|---|---|---|
| 1 | 9 | Simone Deromedis | Italy | BF |
| 2 | 17 | Federico Tomasoni | Italy | BF |
| 3 | 12 | Terence Tchiknavorian | France | SF |
| 4 | 4 | Florian Wilmsmann | Germany | SF |

Heat 2

| Rank | Bib | Name | Country | Notes |
|---|---|---|---|---|
| 1 | 11 | Alex Fiva | Switzerland | BF |
| 2 | 2 | Satoshi Furuno | Japan | BF |
| 3 | 26 | Tim Hronek | Germany | SF |
| 4 | 3 | Ryan Regez | Switzerland | RAL |

==== Finals ====
Small final

| Rank | Bib | Name | Country | Notes |
|---|---|---|---|---|
| 5 | 12 | Terence Tchiknavorian | France | |
| 6 | 26 | Tim Hronek | Germany | |
| 7 | 4 | Florian Wilmsmann | Germany | |

Big final

| Rank | Bib | Name | Country | Notes |
|---|---|---|---|---|
| 1st place, gold medalist(s) | 9 | Simone Deromedis | Italy | |
| 2nd place, silver medalist(s) | 17 | Federico Tomasoni | Italy | |
| 3rd place, bronze medalist(s) | 11 | Alex Fiva | Switzerland | |
| 4 | 2 | Satoshi Furuno | Japan | |
