= FIS Freestyle Ski and Snowboarding World Championships 2025 – Men's ski cross =

Men's ski cross at the FIS Freestyle Ski and Snowboarding World Championships 2025
- Location: Corviglia, Switzerland
- Dates: 20 March (qualification); 21 March (final)
- Competitors: 43 from 16 nations

Medalists
| gold medal | Ryan Regez | Switzerland |
| silver medal | Tobias Müller | Germany |
| bronze medal | Ryō Sugai | Japan |

The Men's ski cross competition at the FIS Freestyle Ski and Snowboarding World Championships 2025 was held on 20 and 21 March 2025.

== Qualification ==
The qualification was held on 20 March at 15:30.

| Rank | Bib | Name | Country | Time | Notes |
|---|---|---|---|---|---|
| 1 | 14 | Ryan Regez | Switzerland | 58.81 | Q |
| 2 | 12 | Ryō Sugai | Japan | 58.87 | Q |
| 3 | 2 | Simone Deromedis | Italy | 58.90 | Q |
| 4 | 5 | Youri Duplessis Kergomard | France | 59.02 | Q |
| 5 | 15 | David Mobärg | Sweden | 59.08 | Q |
| 6 | 3 | Tobias Baur | Switzerland | 59.08 | Q |
| 7 | 8 | Jared Schmidt | Canada | 59.19 | Q |
| 8 | 11 | Kevin Drury | Canada | 59.22 | Q |
| 9 | 6 | Alex Fiva | Switzerland | 59.32 | Q |
| 10 | 18 | Nicolas Raffort | France | 59.33 | Q |
| 11 | 7 | Reece Howden | Canada | 59.38 | Q |
| 12 | 20 | Johannes Rohrweck | Austria | 59.40 | Q |
| 13 | 4 | Erik Mobärg | Sweden | 59.46 | Q |
| 14 | 22 | Dominik Zuech | Italy | 59.49 | Q |
| 15 | 9 | Terence Tchiknavorian | France | 59.51 | Q |
| 16 | 21 | Romain Detraz | Switzerland | 59.53 | Q |
| 17 | 13 | Adam Kappacher | Austria | 59.57 | Q |
| 18 | 16 | Melvin Tchiknavorian | France | 59.58 | Q |
| 19 | 19 | Tim Hronek | Germany | 59.60 | Q |
| 20 | 24 | Cornel Renn | Germany | 59.62 | Q |
| 21 | 28 | Christopher Del Bosco | United States | 59.78 | Q |
| 22 | 1 | Florian Wilmsmann | Germany | 59.84 | Q |
| 23 | 17 | Tristan Takats | Austria | 59.85 | Q |
| 24 | 23 | Federico Tomasoni | Italy | 1:00.01 | Q |
| 25 | 30 | Yanick Gunsch | Italy | 1:00.09 | Q |
| 26 | 10 | Johannes Aujesky | Austria | 1:00.18 | Q |
| 27 | 26 | Tobias Müller | Germany | 1:00.20 | Q |
| 28 | 32 | Daniel Paulus | Czech Republic | 1:00.24 | Q |
| 29 | 33 | Ryuto Kobayashi | Japan | 1:00.26 | Q |
| 30 | 29 | Oliver Davies | Great Britain | 1:00.46 | Q |
| 31 | 31 | Edoardo Zorzi | Italy | 1:00.46 | Q |
| 32 | 25 | Gavin Rowell | Canada | 1:00.48 | Q |
| 33 | 37 | Liam Michael | Australia | 1:00.73 | |
| 34 | 27 | Fredrik Nilsson | Sweden | 1:00.95 | |
| 35 | 38 | Davit Tediashvili | Georgia | 1:01.21 | |
| 36 | 34 | Scott Johns | Great Britain | 1:01.47 | |
| 37 | 36 | Sora Sasaoka | Japan | 1:01.62 | |
| 38 | 35 | Jack Mitchell | United States | 1:02.03 | |
| 39 | 42 | Lasha Kurtanidze | Georgia | 1:03.52 | |
| 40 | 40 | Jakub Válek | Slovakia | 1:03.56 | |
| 41 | 43 | Daniel Smid | Slovenia | 1:04.60 | |
| 42 | 39 | Clemente Costa | Chile | 1:08.15 | |
| 43 | 41 | Ian Fischer | Chile | 1:10.57 | |
| | 44 | Adelijiang Hasitier | China | Did not start | |

== Elimination round ==
=== Quarterfinals ===
Heat 1

| Rank | Bib | Name | Country | Notes |
|---|---|---|---|---|
| 1 | 17 | Adam Kappacher | Austria | Q |
| 2 | 1 | Ryan Regez | Switzerland | Q |
| 3 | 32 | Gavin Rowell | Canada | |
| 4 | 6 | Tobias Baur | Switzerland | |

Heat 3

| Rank | Bib | Name | Country | Notes |
|---|---|---|---|---|
| 1 | 5 | David Mobärg | Sweden | Q |
| 2 | 12 | Johannes Rohrweck | Austria | Q |
| 3 | 21 | Christopher Del Bosco | United States | |
| 4 | 28 | Daniel Paulus | Czech Republic | |

Heat 5

| Rank | Bib | Name | Country | Notes |
|---|---|---|---|---|
| 1 | 3 | Simone Deromedis | Italy | Q |
| 2 | 19 | Tim Hronek | Germany | Q |
| 3 | 30 | Oliver Davies | United Kingdom | |
| 4 | 14 | Dominik Zuech | Italy | |

Heat 7

| Rank | Bib | Name | Country | Notes |
|---|---|---|---|---|
| 1 | 26 | Johannes Aujesky | Austria | Q |
| 2 | 7 | Jared Schmidt | Canada | Q |
| 3 | 10 | Nicolas Raffort | France | |
| 4 | 23 | Tristan Takats | Austria | |

Heat 2

| Rank | Bib | Name | Country | Notes |
|---|---|---|---|---|
| 1 | 8 | Kevin Drury | Canada | Q |
| 2 | 9 | Alex Fiva | Switzerland | Q |
| 3 | 25 | Yanick Gunsch | Italy | |
| 4 | 24 | Federico Tomasoni | Italy | |

Heat 4

| Rank | Bib | Name | Country | Notes |
|---|---|---|---|---|
| 1 | 4 | Youri Duplessis Kergomard | France | Q |
| 2 | 13 | Erik Mobärg | Sweden | Q |
| 3 | 20 | Cornel Renn | Germany | |
| 4 | 29 | Ryuto Kobayashi | Japan | |

Heat 6

| Rank | Bib | Name | Country | Notes |
|---|---|---|---|---|
| 1 | 22 | Florian Wilmsmann | Germany | Q |
| 2 | 27 | Tobias Müller | Germany | Q |
| 3 | 6 | Tobias Baur | Switzerland | |
| 4 | 11 | Reece Howden | Canada | |

Heat 8

| Rank | Bib | Name | Country | Notes |
|---|---|---|---|---|
| 1 | 2 | Ryō Sugai | Japan | Q |
| 2 | 18 | Melvin Tchiknavorian | France | Q |
| 3 | 15 | Terence Tchiknavorian | France | |
| 4 | 31 | Edoardo Zorzi | Italy | |

=== Quarterfinals ===
Heat 1

| Rank | Bib | Name | Country | Notes |
|---|---|---|---|---|
| 1 | 1 | Ryan Regez | Switzerland | Q |
| 2 | 17 | Adam Kappacher | Austria | Q |
| 3 | 9 | Alex Fiva | Switzerland | DNF |
| 4 | 8 | Kevin Drury | Canada | RAL |

Heat 3

| Rank | Bib | Name | Country | Notes |
|---|---|---|---|---|
| 1 | 27 | Tobias Müller | Germany | Q |
| 2 | 3 | Simone Deromedis | Italy | Q |
| 3 | 22 | Florian Wilmsmann | Germany | |
| 4 | 19 | Tim Hronek | Germany | |

Heat 2

| Rank | Bib | Name | Country | Notes |
|---|---|---|---|---|
| 1 | 4 | Youri Duplessis Kergomard | France | Q |
| 2 | 5 | David Mobärg | Sweden | Q |
| 3 | 12 | Johannes Rohrweck | Austria | |
| 4 | 13 | Erik Mobärg | Sweden | |

Heat 4

| Rank | Bib | Name | Country | Notes |
|---|---|---|---|---|
| 1 | 2 | Ryō Sugai | Japan | Q |
| 2 | 18 | Melvin Tchiknavorian | France | Q |
| 3 | 7 | Jared Schmidt | Canada | |
| 4 | 26 | Johannes Aujesky | Austria | |

=== Semifinals ===
Heat 1

| Rank | Bib | Name | Country | Notes |
|---|---|---|---|---|
| 1 | 4 | Youri Duplessis Kergomard | France | Q |
| 2 | 1 | Ryan Regez | Switzerland | Q |
| 3 | 5 | David Mobärg | Sweden | |
| 4 | 17 | Adam Kappacher | Austria | |

Heat 2

| Rank | Bib | Name | Country | Notes |
|---|---|---|---|---|
| 1 | 27 | Tobias Müller | Germany | Q |
| 2 | 2 | Ryō Sugai | Japan | Q |
| 3 | 18 | Melvin Tchiknavorian | France | |
| 4 | 3 | Simone Deromedis | Italy | |

=== Finals ===
==== Small final ====
| Rank | Bib | Name | Country | Notes |
|---|---|---|---|---|
| 5 | 5 | David Mobärg | Sweden | |
| 6 | 3 | Simone Deromedis | Italy | |
| 7 | 17 | Adam Kappacher | Austria | |
| 8 | 18 | Melvin Tchiknavorian | France | |

==== Big final ====
| Rank | Bib | Name | Country | Notes |
|---|---|---|---|---|
| 1st place, gold medalist(s) | 1 | Ryan Regez | Switzerland | |
| 2nd place, silver medalist(s) | 27 | Tobias Müller | Germany | DNF |
| 3rd place, bronze medalist(s) | 2 | Ryō Sugai | Japan | DNF |
| 4 | 4 | Youri Duplessis Kergomard | France | RAL |
