= FIS Freestyle Ski and Snowboarding World Championships 2025 – Mixed team ski cross =

Mixed team ski cross at the FIS Freestyle Ski and Snowboarding World Championships 2025
- Location: Corviglia, Switzerland
- Dates: 22 March
- Competitors: 32 from 10 nations

Medalists
gold medal	Ryan Regez; Fanny Smith	Switzerland
silver medal	Melvin Tchiknavorian; Jade Grillet Aubert	France
bronze medal	Yanick Gunsch; Jole Galli	Italy

The mixed team ski cross competition at the FIS Freestyle Ski and Snowboarding World Championships 2025 was held on 22 March 2025.

== Elimination round ==
=== Quarterfinals ===
Heat 1

Rank	Bib	Country	Athletes	Notes
1	1	France 1	Youri Duplessis Kergomard; Marielle Berger Sabbatel	
2	8	Germany 1	Tobias Müller; Daniela Maier	
3	9	Sweden 1	David Mobärg; Linnea Mobärg	
4	16	Chile 1	Clemente Costa; Stephanie Joffroy	

Heat 3

Rank	Bib	Country	Athletes	Notes
1	3	Germany 2	Florian Wilmsmann; Luisa Klapprott	
2	11	Austria 1	Adam Kappacher; Katrin Ofner	
3	6	Canada 2	Jared Schmidt; Abby McEwen	
4	14	United States 1	Christopher del Bosco; Morgan Shute	

Heat 2

Rank	Bib	Country	Athletes	Notes
1	13	Italy 1	Yanick Gunsch; Jole Galli	
2	4	Switzerland 2	Alex Fiva; Talina Gantenbein	
3	5	Canada 1	Kevin Drury; Courtney Hoffos	
4	12	Austria 2	Johannes Rohrweck; Christina Födermayr	

Heat 4

Rank	Bib	Country	Athletes	Notes
1	7	France 2	Melvin Tchiknavorian; Jade Grillet Aubert	
2	2	Switzerland 1	Ryan Regez; Fanny Smith	
3	10	Sweden 2	Erik Mobärg; Uma Kruse Een	
4	15	Japan 1	Sora Sasaoka; Lin Nakanishi	

=== Semifinals ===
Heat 1

Rank	Bib	Country	Athletes	Notes
1	13	Italy 1	Yanick Gunsch; Jole Galli	
2	1	France 1	Youri Duplessis Kergomard; Marielle Berger Sabbatel	
3	8	Germany 1	Tobias Müller; Daniela Maier	
4	4	Switzerland 2	Alex Fiva; Talina Gantenbein	

Heat 2

Rank	Bib	Country	Athletes	Notes
1	2	Switzerland 1	Ryan Regez; Fanny Smith	
2	7	France 2	Melvin Tchiknavorian; Jade Grillet Aubert	
3	3	Germany 2	Florian Wilmsmann; Luisa Klapprott	
4	11	Austria 1	Adam Kappacher; Katrin Ofner	

=== Finals ===
==== Small final ====
Rank	Bib	Country	Athletes	Notes
1	8	Germany 1	Tobias Müller; Daniela Maier	
2	3	Germany 2	Florian Wilmsmann; Luisa Klapprott	
3	11	Austria 1	Adam Kappacher; Katrin Ofner	
4	4	Switzerland 2	Alex Fiva; Talina Gantenbein	

==== Big final ====
Rank	Bib	Country	Athletes	Notes
1st place, gold medalist(s)	2	Switzerland 1	Ryan Regez; Fanny Smith	
2nd place, silver medalist(s)	7	France 2	Melvin Tchiknavorian; Jade Grillet Aubert	
3rd place, bronze medalist(s)	13	Italy 1	Yanick Gunsch; Jole Galli	
4	1	France 1	Youri Duplessis Kergomard; Marielle Berger Sabbatel	
