= List of individual World Cup victories in skiing =

This is the list of the most successful athletes who have won at least 40 World Cup races in the different World Cups of skiing events. As of March 2026, 52 skiers achieved that feat and among them, Swiss telemark skier Amélie Reymond tops the list with 164 World Cup victories. Austrian alpine skier Annemarie Moser-Pröll is the first person to reach 40 World Cup victories while Swedish alpine skier Ingemar Stenmark is the first male to do so.

== List ==
As of 2 April 2026

Active athletes

No.	Athlete	Country	W.	Years	Sport	Other Information
1	Amélie Wenger-Reymond	Switzerland	164	2007–2023	Telemark Skiing*	76 in Sprint, 45 in Classic, 26 in Parallel Sprint, 17 in Giant Slalom.
2	Marit Bjørgen	Norway	114	1999–2018	Cross-Country Skiing	62 in Distance Races, 40 in Sprint, 12 in Ski Tours.
3	Johannes Høsflot Klæbo	Norway	113	2016–	Cross-Country Skiing	65 in Sprint, 38 in Distance Races, 10 in Ski Tours.
4	Mikaela Shiffrin	United States	110	2011–	Alpine Skiing	73 in Slalom, 22 in Giant Slalom, 5 in Parallel Slalom, 5 in Super-G, 4 in Downhill, 1 in Combined.
5	Conny Kissling	Switzerland	106	1981–1992	Freestyle Skiing	66 in Combined, 34 in Acroski, 4 in Moguls, 2 in Aerials.
6	Mikaël Kingsbury	Canada	100	2010–2026	Freestyle Skiing	63 in Moguls, 37 in Dual Moguls.
7	Ole Einar Bjørndalen	Norway	95	1993–2018	Biathlon/CC Skiing	37 in Pursuit, 35 in Sprint, 14 in Mass Start, 8 in Individual. / 1 in Cross-Country Skiing.
8	Therese Johaug	Norway	89	2007–2025	Cross-Country Skiing	77 in Distance Races, 11 in Ski Tours, 1 in Sprint.
9	Ingemar Stenmark	Sweden	86	1973–1989	Alpine Skiing	46 in Giant Slalom, 40 in Slalom.
10	Lindsey Vonn	United States	84	2000–	Alpine Skiing	45 in Downhill, 28 in Super-G, 5 in Combined, 4 in Giant Slalom, 2 in Slalom.
11	Johannes Thingnes Bø	Norway	80	2013–2025	Biathlon	37 in Sprint, 24 in Pursuit, 14 in Mass Start, 3 in Individual, 2 in Short Individual.
12	Martin Fourcade	France	79	2008–2020	Biathlon	28 in Pursuit, 23 in Sprint, 14 in Mass Start, 14 in Individual.
13	Jarl Magnus Riiber	Norway	78	2015–2025	Nordic Combined	37 in Gundersen LH, 31 in Gundersen NH, 2 in Mass Start LH, 6 in Mass Start NH, 2 Individual Compact LH.
14	Marcel Hirscher	Austria	67	2007–	Alpine Skiing	32 in Slalom, 31 in Giant Slalom, 2 in Parallel Slalom, 1 in Parallel Giant Slalom, 1 in Super-G.
15	Simone Origone	Italy	64	2004–	Speed Skiing*	64 in Speed Skiing.
16	Sara Takanashi	Japan	63	2011–	Ski Jumping	54 in Normal Hill, 9 in Large Hill.
17	Annemarie Moser-Pröll	Austria	62	1969–1980	Alpine Skiing	36 in Downhill, 16 in Giant Slalom, 7 in Combined, 3 in Slalom.
18	Laëtitia Roux	France	60	2007–2018	Ski mountaineering	36 in Individual, 14 in Sprint, 10 in Vertical.
19	Philippe Lau	France	58	2005–2019	Telemark Skiing*	41 in Sprint, 13 in Parallel Sprint, 2 in Classic, 2 in Giant Slalom.
20	Jan Bucher	United States	57	1980–1991	Freestyle Skiing	57 in Acroski.
	Jan Němec	Czech Republic	57	2004–2016	Grass Skiing*	19 in Slalom, 18 in Giant Slalom, 15 in Super-G, 5 in Combined.
22	Valentina Greggio	Italy	56	2012–	Speed Skiing*	56 in Speed Skiing.
23	Vreni Schneider	Switzerland	55	1984–1995	Alpine Skiing	34 in Slalom, 20 in Giant Slalom, 1 in Combined.
24	Hermann Maier	Austria	54	1996–2009	Alpine Skiing	25 in Super-G, 15 in Downhill, 14 in Giant Slalom, 1 in Combined.
	Marco Odermatt	Switzerland	54	2016–	Alpine Skiing	8 in Downhill, 17 in Super-G, 29 in Giant Slalom.
26	Gregor Schlierenzauer	Austria	53	2006–2021	Ski Jumping	36 in Large Hill, 14 in Flying Hill, 3 in Normal Hill.
	Edoardo Frau	Italy	53	2004–2021	Grass Skiing*	23 in Giant Slalom, 19 in Super-G, 8 in Combined, 3 in Slalom.
28	Alberto Tomba	Italy	50	1987–1998	Alpine Skiing	35 in Slalom, 15 in Giant Slalom.
	Justyna Kowalczyk	Poland	50	2001–2018	Cross-Country Skiing	35 in Distance Races, 10 in Sprint, 5 in Ski Tours.
	Sandra Näslund	Sweden	50	2012–	Freestyle Skiing	50 in Ski Cross.
31	Hannu Manninen	Finland	48	1994–2018	Nordic Combined	23 in Sprint, 17 in Gundersen, 6 in Mass Start, 2 in Individual.
	Lara Gut-Behrami	Switzerland	48	2008–	Alpine Skiing	24 in Super-G, 13 in Downhill, 10 in Giant Slalom, 1 in Combined.
	Axelle Mollaret	France	48	2010–	Ski mountaineering	28 in Individual, 20 in Vertical.
34	Matti Nykänen	Finland	46	1981–1991	Ski Jumping	25 in Large Hill, 15 in Normal Hill, 6 in Flying Hill.
	Marc Girardelli	Luxembourg	46	1980–1996	Alpine Skiing	16 in Slalom, 11 in Combined, 9 in Super-G, 7 in Giant Slalom, 3 in Downhill.
	Donna Weinbrecht	United States	46	1988–2002	Freestyle Skiing	43 in Moguls, 3 in Dual Moguls.
	Bjørn Dæhlie	Norway	46	1989–1999	Cross-Country Skiing	45 in Distance Races, 1 in Sprint.
	Renate Götschl	Austria	46	1993–2007	Alpine Skiing	24 in Downhill, 17 in Super-G, 4 in Combined, 1 in Slalom.
	Hannah Kearney	United States	46	2003–2015	Freestyle Skiing	30 in Moguls, 16 in Dual Moguls.
	Tobias Müller	Germany	46	2011–2017	Telemark Skiing*	23 in Sprint, 13 in Classic, 10 in Parallel Sprint.
	Bastien Dayer	Switzerland	46	2005–2023	Telemark Skiing*	21 in Sprint, 17 in Classic, 8 in Parallel Sprint.
	Stefan Kraft	Austria	46	2012–	Ski Jumping	33 in Large Hill, 10 in Flying Hill, 3 in Normal Hill.
43	Yelena Välbe	Russia	45	1987–1998	Cross-Country Skiing	45 in Distance Races.
44	Hermann Reitberger	Germany	44	1980–1991	Freestyle Skiing	44 in Acroski.
	Raphaël Poirée	France	44	1995–2007	Biathlon	15 in Pursuit, 13 in Sprint, 9 in Mass Start, 7 in Individual.
	Sigrid Rykhus	Norway	44	2002–2013	Telemark Skiing*	21 in Sprint, 11 in Classic, 8 in Giant Slalom, 4 in Parallel Sprint.
47	Eric Frenzel	Germany	43	2007–2023	Nordic Combined	21 in Gundersen NH, 19 in Gundersen Large Hill, 2 in Penalty Race, 1 in Mass Start.
48	Magdalena Forsberg	Sweden	42	1994–2002	Biathlon	19 in Pursuit, 13 in Sprint, 7 in Individual, 3 in Mass Start.
	Bente Skari	Norway	42	1992–2003	Cross-Country Skiing	25 in Distance Races, 17 in Sprint.
	Anja Pärson	Sweden	42	1998–2012	Alpine Skiing	18 in Slalom, 14 in Giant Slalom, 6 in Downhill, 4 in Super-G, 1 in Combined.
51	Pirmin Zurbriggen	Switzerland	40	1981–1990	Alpine Skiing	11 in Combined, 10 in Downhill, 10 in Super-G, 7 in Giant Slalom, 2 in Slalom.
	Nika Prevc	Slovenia	40	2021–	Ski Jumping	24 in Large Hill, 14 in Normal Hill, 2 in Flying Hill.

- Ties are listed in chronological order.
- * Indicates a non-Olympic discipline or sport
