= FIS Freestyle Ski and Snowboarding World Championships 2023 – Mixed team ski cross =

Mixed team ski cross at the FIS Freestyle Ski and Snowboarding World Championships 2023
- Location: Bakuriani, Georgia
- Dates: 26 February

Medalists
| gold medal | David Mobärg; Sandra Näslund | Sweden |
| silver medal | Reece Howden; Marielle Thompson | Canada |
| bronze medal | Federico Tomasoni; Jole Galli | Italy |

The Mixed team ski cross competition at the FIS Freestyle Ski and Snowboarding World Championships 2023 was held on 26 February 2023.

== Results ==
=== Pre-heat ===
| Rank | Bib | Name | Country | Notes |
|---|---|---|---|---|
| 1 | 7 | Federico Tomasoni; Jole Galli | Italy | Q |
| 2 | 8 | Daniel Paulus; Nikol Kučerová | Czech Republic | Q |
| 3 | 9 | Tetsuya Furuno; Sakurako Mukogawa | Japan | |

=== Semifinals ===
Heat 1

| Rank | Bib | Name | Country | Notes |
|---|---|---|---|---|
| 1 | 1 | David Mobärg; Sandra Näslund | Sweden | |
| 2 | 5 | Youri Duplessis Kergomard; Marielle Berger Sabbatel | France | |
| 3 | 8 | Daniel Paulus; Nikol Kučerová | Czech Republic | |
| 4 | 4 | Niklas Bachsleitner; Daniela Maier | Germany | |

Heat 2

| Rank | Bib | Name | Country | Notes |
|---|---|---|---|---|
| 1 | 2 | Reece Howden; Marielle Thompson | Canada | |
| 2 | 7 | Federico Tomasoni; Jole Galli | Italy | |
| 3 | 3 | Jonas Lenherr; Fanny Smith | Switzerland | |
| 4 | 6 | Tristan Takats; Sonja Gigler | Austria | |

=== Finals ===
==== Small final ====
| Rank | Bib | Name | Country | Notes |
|---|---|---|---|---|
| 5 | 3 | Jonas Lenherr; Fanny Smith | Switzerland | |
| 6 | 8 | Daniel Paulus; Nikol Kučerová | Czech Republic | |
| 7 | 4 | Niklas Bachsleitner; Daniela Maier | Germany | |
| 8 | 6 | Tristan Takats; Sonja Gigler | Austria | |

==== Big final ====
| Rank | Bib | Name | Country | Notes |
|---|---|---|---|---|
| 1st place, gold medalist(s) | 1 | David Mobärg; Sandra Näslund | Sweden | |
| 2nd place, silver medalist(s) | 2 | Reece Howden; Marielle Thompson | Canada | |
| 3rd place, bronze medalist(s) | 7 | Federico Tomasoni; Jole Galli | Italy | |
| 4 | 5 | Youri Duplessis Kergomard; Marielle Berger Sabbatel | France | |
