= Veronique Hronek =

German alpine skier (born 1991)

Personal information
- Born: 23 September 1991 (age 34) Unterwössen, Germany

Skiing career
- Sport: Alpine skiing

Veronique Hronek (born 23 September 1991) is a German alpine ski racer.

She competed at the 2015 World Championships in Beaver Creek, USA, in the Super-G. She is the older sister of freestyle skier Tim Hronek.
