= Jade Grillet-Aubert =

French freestyle skier (born 1997)

Personal information
- Born: 22 November 1997 (age 28) Évian-les-Bains, France

Sport
- Sport: Freestyle skiing
- Event: Ski cross
Medal record
Women's freestyle skiing
Representing France
World Championships
Silver medal – second place	2025 Engadin	Mixed team ski cross

Jade Grillet-Aubert (born 22 November 1997) is a French freestyle skier specializing in ski cross. She also competed in alpine skiing.

== Career ==
=== Alpine skiing ===
On 9 April 2013, Grillet-Aubert became French Under 16 Champion in giant slalom at Les Menuires. On 27 March 2017, she caused a sensation by becoming Vice-Champion of France in giant slalom at Lélex. On 21 December 2018, she competed in her first World Cup event in the giant slalom in Courchevel.

=== Ski cross ===
Grillet-Aubert switched to ski cross and made her first international appearance on 18 December 2019 in Val Thorens, where she finished seventh in the European Cup. She made her World Cup debut on 1 February 2020, in Megève, finishing 20th, which earned her first World Cup points in her debut.

Grillet-Aubert's first podium finish in this series was on 20 December 2020, in Val Thorens, finishing second in ski cross. In this competition, she separated Fanny Smith from Switzerland and Canadian Marielle Thompson. At the 2021 World Championships, Grillet-Aubert finished in 12th place in ski cross, while at the 2022 Winter Olympics, she finished in fourteenth place. She finished the 2021–22 season in fifth place in the ski cross standings.

At the 2025 World Championships in Engadine, Grillet-Aubert won the silver medal in the team competition with Melvin Tchiknavorian. She also finished fifth in the individual competition.
