= 2023–24 Biathlon World Cup – Stage 5 =

2023–24 Biathlon World Cup Stage

The 2023–24 Biathlon World Cup – Stage 5 was the fifth event of the season and was held in Ruhpolding, Germany, from 10 to 14 January 2024.

== Schedule of events ==
The events took place at the following times.

| Date | Time | Events |
|---|---|---|
| 10 January | 16:30 CET | 4 x 6 km Women's Relay |
| 11 January | 16:30 CET | 4 x 7.5 km Men's Relay |
| 12 January | 16:30 CET | Women's 7.5 km Sprint |
| 13 January | 16:30 CET | Men's 10 km Sprint |
| 14 January | 14:30 CET | Women's 10 km Pursuit |
| 14 January | 16:45 CET | Men's 12.5 km Pursuit |

== Medal winners ==
=== Men ===
| Event: | Gold: | Time | Silver: | Time | Bronze: | Time |
|---|---|---|---|---|---|---|
| 4 x 7,5 km Men Relay | Norway; Sturla Holm Lægreid; Johannes Dale-Skjevdal; Tarjei Bø; Vetle Sjåstad Christiansen | 1:09:49.6 (0+1) (0+1) (0+0) (0+3) (0+0) (0+0) (0+2) (0+1) | Germany; Justus Strelow; Johannes Kühn; Benedikt Doll; Philipp Nawrath | 1:10:34.6 (0+1) (0+0) (0+0) (0+1) (0+0) (2+3) (0+1) (0+1) | Italy; Elia Zeni; Didier Bionaz; Lukas Hofer; Tommaso Giacomel | 1:10:48.3 (0+2) (0+2) (0+1) (0+2) (0+1) (0+0) (0+1) (0+1) |
| 10 km Sprint | Vetle Sjåstad Christiansen; Norway | 22:27.2 (0+0) | Tommaso Giacomel; Italy | 22:44.1 (1+0) | Tarjei Bø; Norway | 22:47.3 (0+0) |
| 12.5 km Pursuit | Johannes Dale-Skjevdal; Norway | 30:38.0 (0+0+2+0) | Vetle Sjåstad Christiansen; Norway | +1.7 (0+0+1+2) | Johannes Thingnes Bø; Norway | +2.4 (1+0+1+0) |

=== Women ===
| Event: | Gold: | Time | Silver: | Time | Bronze: | Time |
|---|---|---|---|---|---|---|
| 4 x 6 km Women Relay | France; Lou Jeanmonnot; Jeanne Richard; Sophie Chauveau; Julia Simon | 1:08:44.5 (0+1) (0+0) (0+0) (0+1) (0+0) (0+1) (0+1) (0+0) | Sweden; Anna Magnusson; Linn Persson; Mona Brorsson; Elvira Öberg | 1:08:53.2 (0+0) (0+0) (0+1) (0+0) (0+0) (0+0) (0+2) (0+0) | Germany; Janina Hettich-Walz; Sophia Schneider; Franziska Preuß; Hanna Kebinger | 1:09:31.2 (0+0) (0+2) (0+0) (0+0) (0+0) (0+0) (0+0) (0+1) |
| 7.5 km Sprint | Ingrid Landmark Tandrevold; Norway | 19:25.4 (0+0) | Mona Brorsson; Sweden | 19:43.6 (0+0) | Lisa Vittozzi; Italy | 19:44.4 (0+0) |
| 10 km Pursuit | Lisa Vittozzi; Italy | 30:30.7 (1+0+0+0) | Ingrid Landmark Tandrevold; Norway | +0.7 (0+0+1+0) | Juni Arnekleiv; Norway | +9.1 (0+0+0+0) |

== Achievements ==
Best individual performance for all time

Men
| Place | Name | Age | Race |
|---|---|---|---|
| 12 | (United States) Campbell Wright | 21 | Sprint |
| 23 | (Moldova) Maksim Makarov | 28 | Sprint |
| 24 | (Finland) Heikki Laitinen | 29 | Sprint |
| 24 | (France) Oscar Lombardot | 23 | Pursuit |
| 26 | (Italy) Elia Zeni | 22 | Pursuit |
| 40 | (Czech Republic) Vitezslav Hornig | 24 | Pursuit |
| 61 | (France) Valentin Lejeune | 21 | Sprint |
| 77 | (Estonia) Mehis Udam | 19 | Sprint |
| 90 | (Poland) Kacper Gunka | 24 | Sprint |
| 91 | (Finland) Arttu Heikkinen | 19 | Sprint |
| 103 | (United Kingdom) Marcus Bolin Webb | 28 | Sprint |
Debut
| 61 | (France) Valentin Lejeune | 21 | Sprint |
| 90 | (Poland) Kacper Gunka | 24 | Sprint |
| 91 | (Finland) Arttu Heikkinen | 19 | Sprint |

Women
| Place | Name | Age | Race |
|---|---|---|---|
| 2 | (Sweden) Mona Brorsson | 33 | Sprint |
| 15 | (Germany) Julia Tannheimer | 18 | Sprint |
| 16 | (Sweden) Sara Andersson | 20 | Sprint |
| 22 | (Canada) Benita Peiffer | 23 | Pursuit |
| 63 | (Latvia) Sandra Bulina | 22 | Sprint |
Debut
| 15 | (Germany) Julia Tannheimer | 18 | Sprint |
