= Christoph Danksagmüller =

Austrian freestyle skier

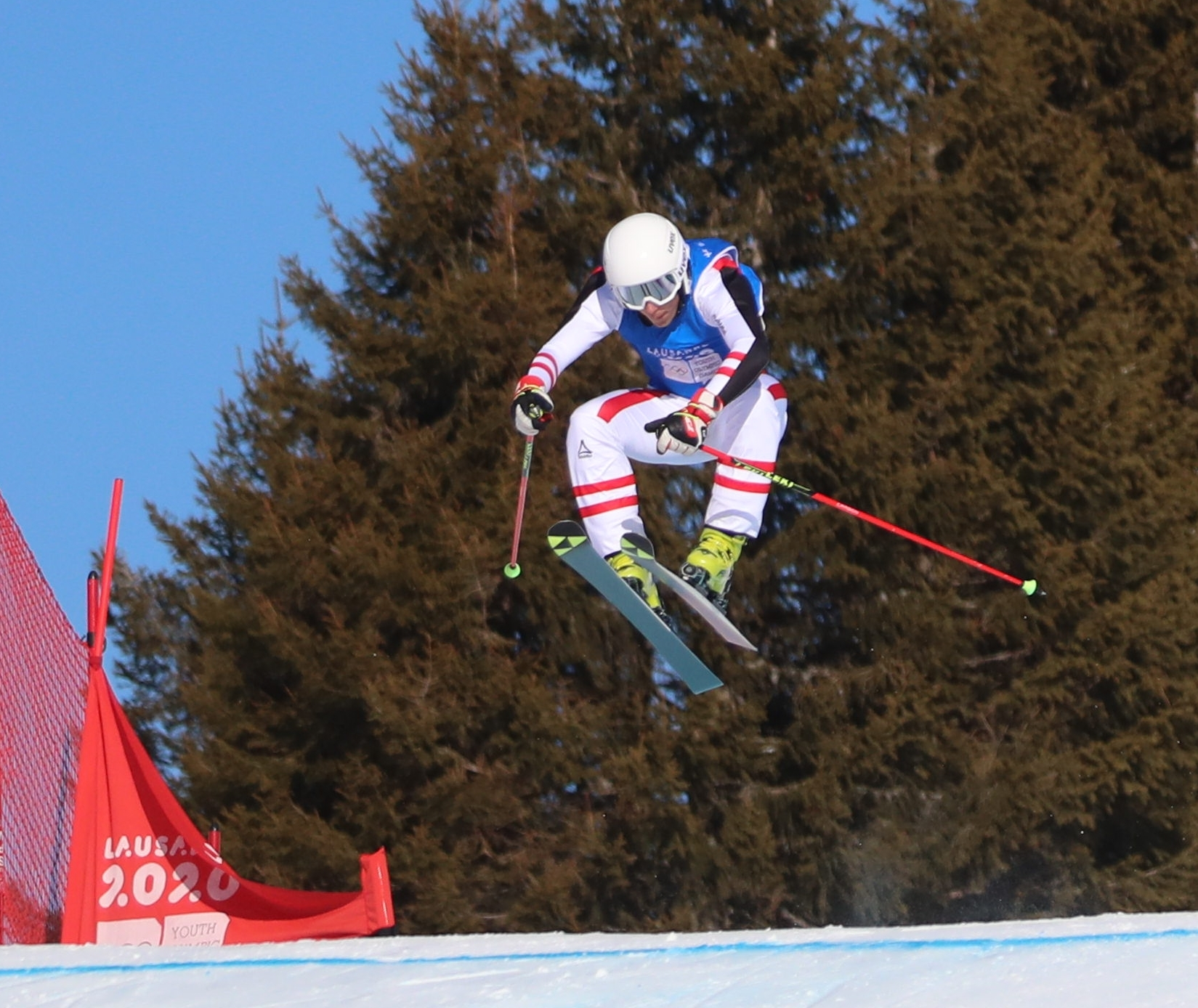
- Danksagmüller in 2020

Personal information
- Born: 5 June 2002 (age 24) Mondsee, Austria

Sport
- Country: Austria
- Sport: Freestyle skiing
- Event: Ski cross
- Club: Salzburg Ski Club

Christoph Danksagmüller (born 5 July 2002) is an Austrian freestyle skier. He competed in the men's ski cross event at the 2026 Winter Olympics. He made his senior World Cup debut in 2024.
