= Nicola Romanin =

Italian biathlete (born 1996)

- Romanin in 2026

Personal information
- Nationality: Italy
- Born: 26 February 1994 (age 32) Tolmezzo, Italy

Sport

Professional information
- Sport: Biathlon

World Cup
- Seasons: 2 (2024/25-)
Medal record
Men's biathlon
Representing Italy
European Championships
Bronze medal – third place	2024 Osrblie	4 × 6 km relay

Nicola Romanin (born 26 February 1994) is an Italian biathlete. He competed in four events at the 2026 Winter Olympics.
