= Federico Tomasoni =

Italian freestyle skier (born 1997)

Personal information
- Born: 4 July 1997 (age 28) Castione della Presolana, Italy

Sport
- Sport: Freestyle skiing
- Event: Ski cross
Medal record
Men's freestyle skiing
Representing Italy
Olympic Games
Silver medal – second place	2026 Milano Cortina	Ski cross
World Championships
Bronze medal – third place	2023 Bakuriani	Mixed team ski cross

Federico Tomasoni (born 4 July 1997) is an Italian freestyle skier who specializes in the ski cross discipline. He represented Italy at the 2026 Winter Olympics, where he won a silver medal in that event.

== Career ==
Tomasoni made his first appearance on the international stage on 23 November 2019 in Pitztal, where he finished 30th in the national competition.

Tomasoni made his World Cup debut on 19 December 2021 in Innichen, where he finished 56th. He scored his first points on 15 January 2022 in Nakiska, finishing 19th.

Tomasoni represented Italy at the 2023 FIS Freestyle Ski World Championships and won a bronze medal in the mixed team ski cross event, along with Jole Galli. In the individual competition, he finished in sixth place.

== Personal life ==
Federico Tomasoni was raised at the foot of Mount Presolana and is the son of Battista Tomasoni, who was first a high-level athlete and later became a national instructor.

Tomasoni was in a relationship with ski racer Matilde Lorenzi until her death in October 2024.
