= Davide Graz =

Italian cross-country skier (born 2000)

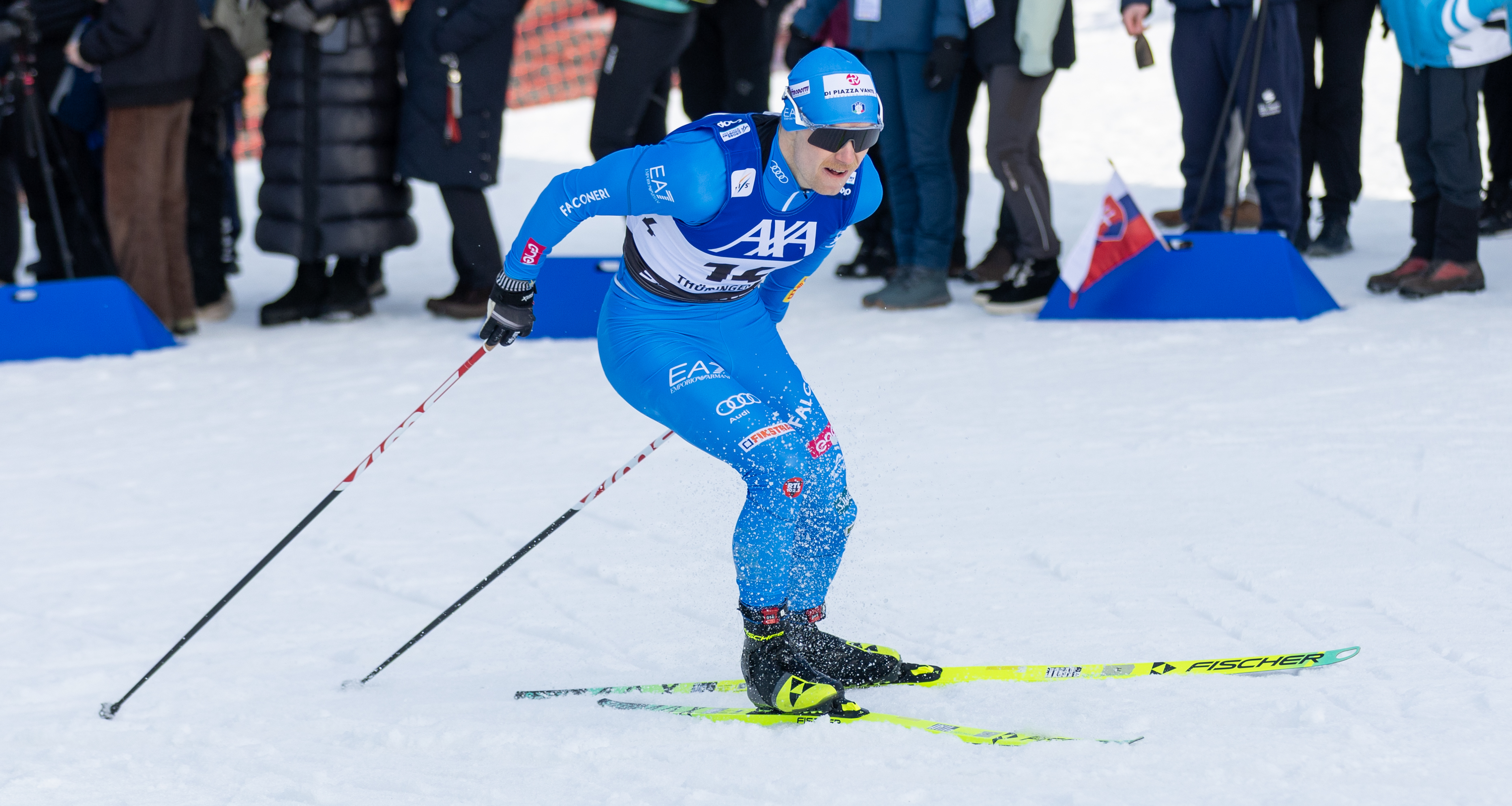

Personal information
- Nationality: Italy
- Born: 4 March 2000 (age 26) Sappada, Italy

Sport
- Sport: Skiing
- Club: G.S. Fiamme Gialle

World Cup career
- Seasons: 5 – (2019–present)
- Indiv. starts: 39
- Indiv. podiums: 0
- Team starts: 6
- Team podiums: 0
- Overall titles: 0 – (65th in 2023)
- Discipline titles: 0
Medal record
Men's cross-country skiing
Representing Italy
Olympic Games
Bronze medal – third place	2026 Milano Cortina	4 × 7.5 km relay
Junior World Championships
Bronze medal – third place	2020 Oberwiesenthal	10 km classical
Bronze medal – third place	2020 Oberwiesenthal	4 × 5 km relay
- Updated on 28 March 2023

Davide Graz (born 5 March 2000) is an Italian cross-country skier. He competed in the sprint at the 2022 Winter Olympics.

== Cross-country skiing results ==
All results are sourced from the International Ski Federation (FIS).

=== Olympic Games ===
Year	Age	15 km individual	30 km skiathlon	50 km mass start	Sprint	4 × 10 km relay	Team sprint
2022	21	—	—	—^{[a]}	28	8	—

^{a} Distance reduced to 30 km due to weather conditions.

=== World Championships ===
Year	Age	15 km individual	30 km skiathlon	50 km mass start	Sprint	4 × 10 km relay	Team sprint
2021	20	DNS	—	—	—	—	—
2023	22	35	—	—	35	—	—

=== World Cup ===
==== Season standings ====
Season	Age	Discipline standings				Ski Tour standings			
Season	Age	Overall	Distance	Sprint	U23	Nordic Opening	Tour de Ski	Ski Tour 2020	World Cup Final
2019	18	NC	—	NC	NC	—	—	—N/a	—
2020	19	127	—	75	8	—	—	—	—N/a
2021	20	106	89	79	16	—	DNF	—N/a	—N/a
2022	21	128	NC	76	21	—N/a	DNF	—N/a	—N/a
2023	22	65	67	43	10	—N/a	DNF	—N/a	—N/a
