= Elia Zeni =

Italian biathlete (born 2001)

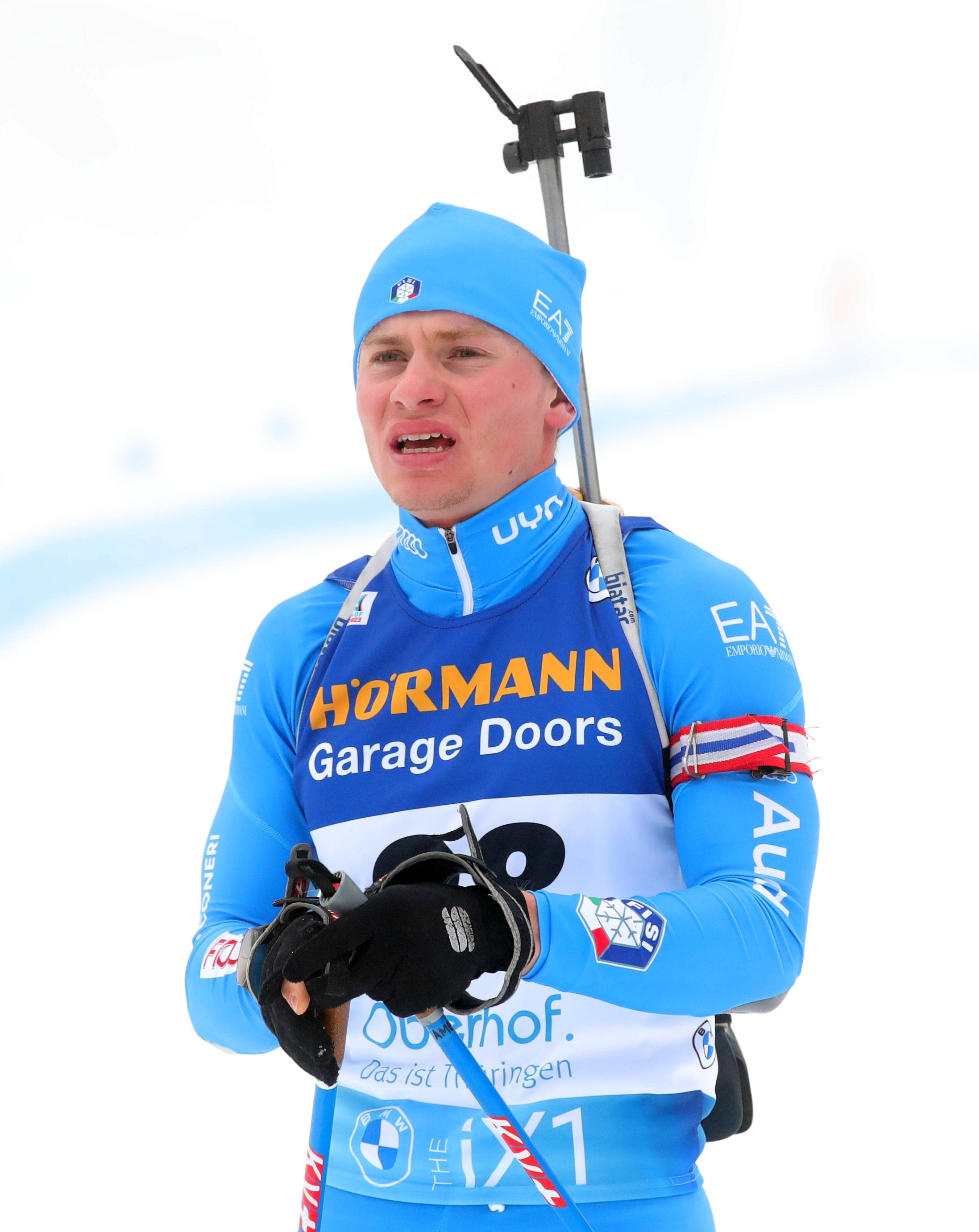
- Zeni in 2023

Personal information
- Nationality: Italian
- Born: 5 June 2001 (age 25) Cavalese, Italy

Sport
- Country: Italy
- Sport: Biathlon
Medal record
Men's biathlon
Representing Italy
Junior World Championships
Silver medal – second place	2022 Soldier Hollow	4 × 7.5 km relay

Elia Zeni (born 5 June 2001) is an Italian biathlete. He has competed in the Biathlon World Cup since 2022.

== Career ==
Elia Zeni made his IBU Cup debut in the 2022-2023 season in the Ridanna stage, finishing 16th in the sprint and 15th in the pursuit. In the Pokljuka stage, he finished 5th in the sprint. He made his World Cup debut in the 2022-2023 season in the Antholz stage; in his first race he finished 52nd in the sprint. He was joined Italian team to the 2023 World Championships in Oberhof, where he finished 7th in the 4x7.5 relay, along with Didier Bionaz, Tommaso Giacomel and Lukas Hofer, 48th in the 20 km individual race, 53rd in the 12.5 km pursuit and the 10 km sprint. He made it onto the World Cup podium for the first time in the 2023–2024 season by taking third place in the relay in Oberhof together with Didier Bionaz, Lukas Hofer and Tommaso Giacomel; at the World Championships in Nové Město na Moravě 2024 he finished 53rd in the individual and 6th in the relay. His best World Cup placing is 24th in the sprint in Canmore in the 2023–2024 season.

== Biathlon results ==
All results are sourced from the International Biathlon Union.

=== Olympic Games ===
0 medals

Event	Individual	Sprint	Pursuit	Mass start	Relay	Mixed relay
(Italy) 2026 Milano Cortina	25th	62nd	—	—	—	—

=== World Championships ===
0 medals

Event	Individual	Sprint	Pursuit	Mass start	Relay	Mixed relay	Single mixed relay
(Germany) 2023 Oberhof	48th	53rd	53rd	—	7th	—	—
(Czech Republic) 2024 Nové Město	53rd	—	—	—	6th	—	—
(Switzerland) 2025 Lenzerheide	55th	—	—	—	5th	—	—

=== World Cup ===
==== Relay podiums ====
No.	Season	Date	Location	Level	Race	Place	Teammate
1	2023–24	7 January 2024	(Germany) Oberhof	World Cup	Relay	3rd	Bionaz, Hofer, Giacomel
2	2023–24	11 January 2024	(Germany) Ruhpolding	World Cup	Relay	3rd	Bionaz, Hofer, Giacomel

=== Youth and Junior World Championships ===
1 medals (1 silver)

Year	Age	Individual	Sprint	Pursuit	Relay
(Switzerland) 2020 Lenzerheide	19	36th	16th	23rd	8th
(United States) 2022 Soldier Hollow	20	30th	27th	31st	Silver
