= Melvin Tchiknavorian =

French freestyle skier (born 1997)

Personal information
- Born: 3 September 1997 (age 28) Marseille, France

Sport
- Sport: Freestyle skiing
- Event: Ski cross
Medal record
Men's freestyle skiing
Representing France
World Championships
Silver medal – second place	2025 Engadin	Mixed team ski cross

Melvin Tchiknavorian (born 3 September 1997) is a French freestyle skier specializing in ski cross. He represented France at the 2026 Winter Olympics.

== Career ==
Tchiknavorian made his first international appearance on 19 December 2015 in Val Thorens, where he finished 29th in the FIS competition. In 2016, he finished 30th at the Junior World Championships in Val Thorens.

Tchiknavorian made his first appearance in the World Cup on 11 December 2021 in Val Thorens, where he finished 61st. He scored his first points a day later in the same place, finishing 16th. He achieved his first podium finish in a World Cup competition on 24 February 2024 in Reiteralm, finishing third. He was only beaten by Sweden's Erik Mobärg and Jonas Lenherr from Switzerland.

At the 2025 World Championships in Engadine, Tchiknavorian won the silver medal in the team competition with Jade Grillet-Aubert. He also finished eighth in the individual competition.

== Personal life ==
Tchiknavorian is the younger cousin of Terence Tchiknavorian who also became a freestyle skier. Both of them are of Armenian descent.
