= Ryan Regez =

Swiss freestyle skier

Personal information
- Nationality: Swiss
- Born: 30 January 1993 (age 33) Interlaken, Switzerland
- Height: 1.92 m (6 ft 4 in)
- Weight: 92 kg (203 lb)

Sport
- Country: Switzerland
- Sport: Freestyle skiing
- Event: Skicross
- Club: SC Wengen
Medal record
Men's freestyle skiing
Representing Switzerland
Olympic Games
Gold medal – first place	2022 Beijing	Ski cross
World Championships
Gold medal – first place	2025 Engadin	Ski cross
Gold medal – first place	2025 Engadin	Mixed team ski cross

Ryan Regez (born 30 January 1993) is a Swiss freestyle skier who specializes in the ski cross discipline. He represents Switzerland at the Winter Olympic Games, and he earned a gold medal in the 2022 edition.

== Career ==
Regez grew up in Wengen, has Swiss-British dual citizenship, and is a member of the Wengen ski club.

On 15 February 2014, Regez contested his first FIS race. He finished 40th at Watles. In January 2015, he made his European Cup debut in Orcières and won the overall victory in the 2015–16 season and thus secured a place in the main squad. He made his debut in the FIS Freestyle Ski World Cup on 5 December in Montafon and achieved 58th place. The 2016–17 season went well, but at the penultimate race in Russia's Sunny Valley, he fell while leading in the 1/8 final and tore his cruciate ligament. Despite this, he finished 30th this season and 136th overall. After this injury, he started again in the European Cup the following season, winning for the second time overall.

Regez surprisingly achieved his first World Cup victory on 16 February 2019 in Feldberg. The day after, he confirmed that with a third-place finish, which brought him 9th place in the 2018–19 season with 267 points. He started the 2019–20 season in third place in Val Thorens, France. His second World Cup victory followed on 14 December in Montafon, and his third on 25 January 2020 in Idre He finished the season with 2nd place in ski cross and 16th in the overall World Cup, which is his best result in the World Cup so far. On 7 March 2020, he became the Swiss champion in ski cross for the first time in Crans-Montana. In a tight race, he won ahead of Joos Berry and Armin Niederer.

With three second places in the 2020–21 season, he nevertheless finished 7th place in the general ski cross classification because he could not compete in the last three races, having contracted COVID-19 and having fractured his hand during training. At the 2022 Beijing Olympic Games, Regez became the new Olympic ski cross champion ahead of his compatriot Alex Fiva, the reigning world champion at that moment.
