= Giada D'Antonio =

Italian alpine ski racer (born 2009)

Personal information
- Born: 28 May 2009 (age 17) Naples, Italy

Skiing career
- Country: Italy
- Sport: Alpine skiing
- Club: Sci Club Vesuvio
- Disciplines: Slalom, Giant slalom
- World Cup debut: 28 December 2025 (age 16)

Olympics
- Teams: 1 – (2026)
- Medals: 0 (0 gold)

World Championships
- Medals: 0 (0 gold)

World Cup
- Seasons: 1 – (2026)
- Wins: 0
- Podiums: 0
- Overall titles: 0
- Discipline titles: 0

Giada D'Antonio (born 28 May 2009) is an Italian alpine ski racer who competes in the technical disciplines of slalom and giant slalom. She made her FIS Alpine Ski World Cup debut in 2025 and represented Italy at the 2026 Winter Olympics in alpine skiing.

== Early life ==
D'Antonio was born in Naples, Italy, and grew up in San Sebastiano al Vesuvio. Her father is Italian and her mother is Colombian with Ecuadorian ancestry.

She began skiing as a child in Roccaraso in the Abruzzo region and developed her skills with Sci Club Vesuvio.

Recognized as a promising talent in youth competitions, she later moved to Predazzo in northern Italy to continue her training and education in a specialized sports program.

== Career ==
D'Antonio gained attention in youth alpine skiing competitions for her performances at national and international junior events.

In November 2025, she won two FIS slalom races in Schilthorn, Switzerland, and later achieved a third-place finish in a slalom race at Pozza di Fassa in January 2026.

She made her FIS Alpine Ski World Cup debut on 28 December 2025 in the slalom event at Semmering, though she did not complete the first run.

== 2026 Winter Olympics ==
At age 16, D'Antonio was the youngest member of the Italian alpine skiing team at the 2026 Winter Olympics in Cortina d'Ampezzo.

She competed in the team alpine combined event but did not finish the slalom run after losing a ski.

Shortly afterward, she suffered a tear of the anterior cruciate ligament in her right knee during a training fall in Dobbiaco, which ended her Olympic participation and season.

== Personal life ==
D'Antonio has been nicknamed "Black Panther" and has cited Alberto Tomba, Lindsey Vonn, and Mikaela Shiffrin as her sporting inspirations.

Outside skiing, she has practiced sports such as ice skating, artistic gymnastics, and swimming.
