= Laura Lobis =

Italian ice hockey player (born 2006)

- Born: March 25, 2006 (age 20) Bolzano, Italy
- Height: 1.68 m (5 ft 6 in)
- Weight: 72 kg (159 lb; 11 st 5 lb)
- Position: Defense
- Shoots: Left
- EWHL/IHLW team Former teams: EV Bozen Eagles; HC Ambrì-Piotta Girls; Färjestad BK
- National team: Italy
- Playing career: 2019–present

Laura Lobis (born March 25, 2006) is an Italian ice hockey player. She is a member of the Italian women's national ice hockey team that participated in 2026 Winter Olympics.

== Playing career ==
=== International ===
Making her Olympic debut on February 5, 2026, versus France, Lobis recorded one of the assists on the game-winning goal scored by Rebecca Roccella. The 4–1 final at Santagiulia Arena marked Italy's first ever win in women's ice hockey at the Olympics.

In Italy's third game of the Olympics, Lobis recorded an assis in a 3–2 win on February 9, 2026, versus Japan.
