= Alessandra Fumagalli =

Italian skeleton racer (born 1998)

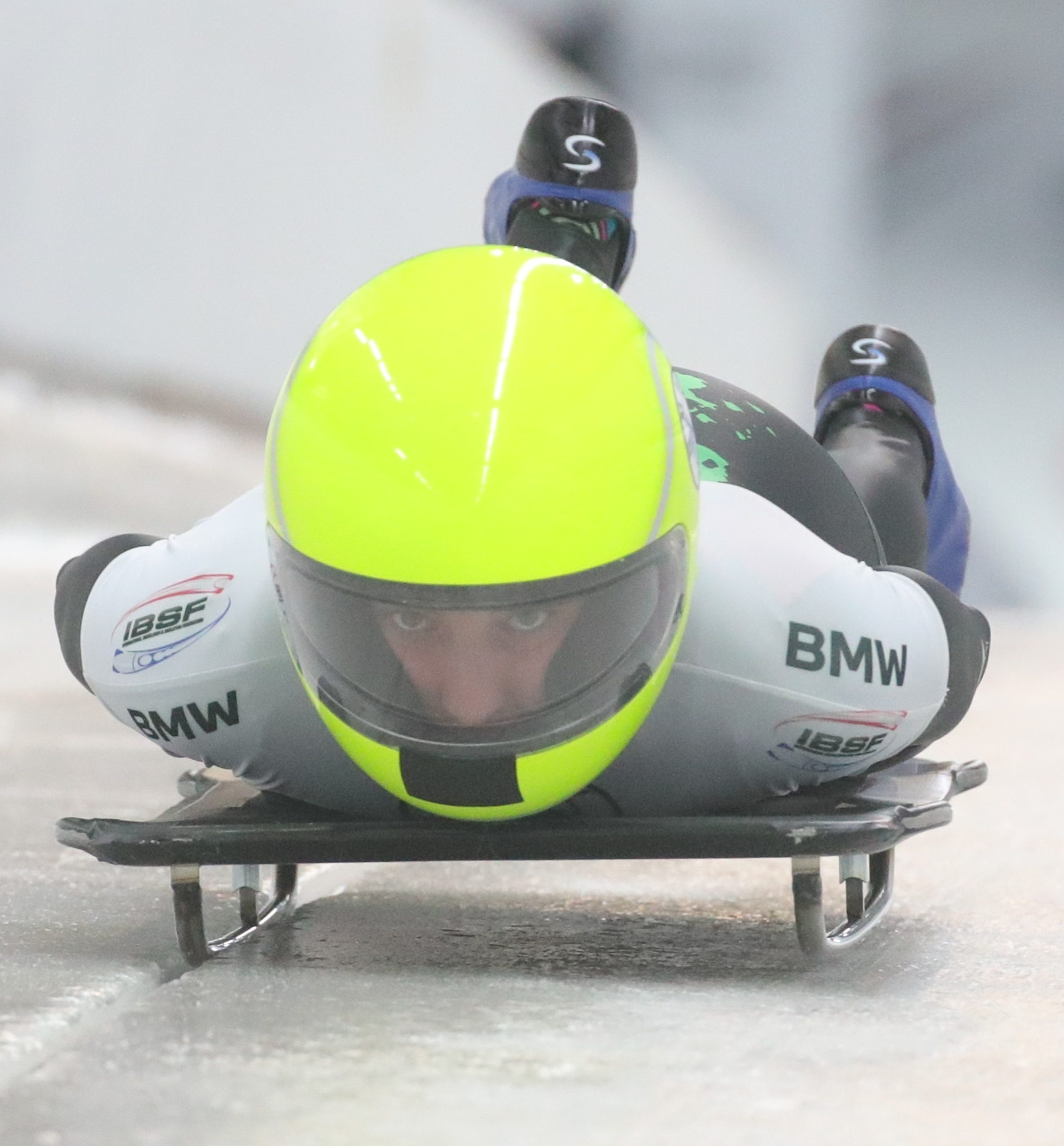
- Fumagalli in 2023

Personal information
- Born: 16 August 1998 (age 28) Bergamo, Italy

Sport
- Country: Italy
- Sport: Skeleton
Medal record
Women's skeleton
Representing Italy
European Championships
Silver medal – second place	2026 St. Moritz	Mixed team

Alessandra Fumagalli (born 16 August 1998) is an Italian skeleton racer. She represented Italy at the 2026 Winter Olympics.

== Career ==
Fumagalli competed at the IBSF European Championships 2026 and won a silver medal in the mixed team event, along with Amedeo Bagnis. During the 2025–26 Skeleton World Cup, she earned her first career Skeleton World Cup podium on 9 January 2026, finishing third in the mixed team event. She was then selected to represent Italy at the 2026 Winter Olympics.
