= Jole Galli =

Italian freestyle skier (born 1995)

Personal information
- Born: 26 July 1995 (age 30) Samedan, Switzerland

Sport
- Sport: Freestyle skiing
- Event: Ski cross
Medal record
Women's freestyle skiing
Representing Italy
World Championships
Bronze medal – third place	2023 Bakuriani	Mixed team ski cross
Bronze medal – third place	2025 Engadin	Mixed team ski cross

Jole Galli (born 26 July 1995) is an Italian freestyle skier specializing in ski cross. She represented Italy at the 2022 and 2026 Winter Olympics.

== Career ==
Galli represented Italy at the 2022 Winter Olympics in the ski cross event, and was eliminated in the quarterfinals.

During the 2022–23 FIS Freestyle Ski World Cup, she earned her first career World Cup podium on 17 February 2023, finishing in third place in the ski cross event. She became the first Italian woman to podium in the event. She then represented Italy at the 2023 FIS Freestyle Ski World Championships and won a bronze medal in the mixed team ski cross event, along with Federico Tomasoni.

During the 2024–25 FIS Freestyle Ski World Cup she earned her first career World Cup victory on 9 February 2025 in ski cross. She became the first Italian woman to win the ski cross event. On 1 March 2025, she earned her second career World Cup victory. She finished the season ranked fourth in the ski cross World Cup standings. She again represented Italy at the 2025 FIS Freestyle Ski World Championships and won a bronze medal in the mixed team ski cross event, along with Yanick Gunsch.

On 30 January 2026, she earned her third World Cup victory, and first of the 2025–26 FIS Freestyle Ski World Cup season.
