= Youri Duplessis Kergomard =

French freestyle skier (born 1996)

Personal information
- Born: 3 April 1996 (age 30) Montpellier, France

Sport
- Sport: Freestyle skiing
- Event: Skicross

World Cup career
- Seasons: 5 – (2020, 2023–present)
- Indiv. starts: 98
- Indiv. podiums: 16
- Indiv. wins: 4
- Updated on 31 January 2026

Youri Duplessis Kergomard (born 3 April 1996) is a French freestyle skier. He represented France at the 2026 Winter Olympics.

== Career ==
During the 2022–23 FIS Freestyle Ski World Cup, Duplessis Kergomard earned his first career World Cup victory on 25 February 2024 at Reiteralm. A year later, he again won the ski cross event at Reiteralm on 17 January 2025, the same track he won his first career World Cup. He earned his third career World Cup victory on 2 February 2025. In the final race of the 2024–25 FIS Freestyle Ski World Cup he finished in second place, and finished fourth overall in the ski cross World Cup standings.

He represented France at the 2025 Snowboarding World Championships in the ski cross event. During the big final he crossed the line in second, however, the jury ruled that he impeded Tobias Müller, and he received a yellow card. As a result, Müller won the silver medal.

During the 2025–26 FIS Freestyle Ski World Cup he earned his fourth career World Cup victory on 23 January 2026.
