= Tim Hronek =

German freestyle skier (born 1995)

Personal information
- Nationality: German
- Born: 1 June 1995 (age 30) Traunstein, Germany
- Height: 1.74 m (5 ft 9 in)

Sport
- Sport: Freestyle skiing

Tim Hronek (born 1 June 1995) is a German freestyle skier. He competed in the 2018 and 2026 Winter Olympics. He is the younger brother of alpine skier Veronique Hronek.
