= Tobias Müller (skier) =

German freestyle skier (born 1992)

Personal information
- Born: 2 October 1992 (age 33) Oberstdorf, Bayern, Germany

Sport
- Country: Germany
- Sport: Freestyle skiing
- Event: Skicross
Medal record
Men's freestyle skiing
Representing Germany
World Championships
Silver medal – second place	2025 Engadin	Ski cross
Winter Universiade
Gold medal – first place	2019 Krasnoyarsk	Slopestyle

Tobias Müller (born 2 October 1992) is a German freestyle skier who represented Germany at the 2022 Winter Olympics.

== Career ==
Müller competed at the 2019 Winter Universiade and won a gold medal in the slopestyle event.

Müller represented Germany at the 2025 Snowboarding World Championships in the ski cross event. Youri Duplessis Kergomard crossed the line in second, however, the jury ruled that Kergomard impeded Müller, and he received a yellow card. As a result, Müller won the silver medal.
