= Terence Tchiknavorian =

French freestyle skier (born 1992)

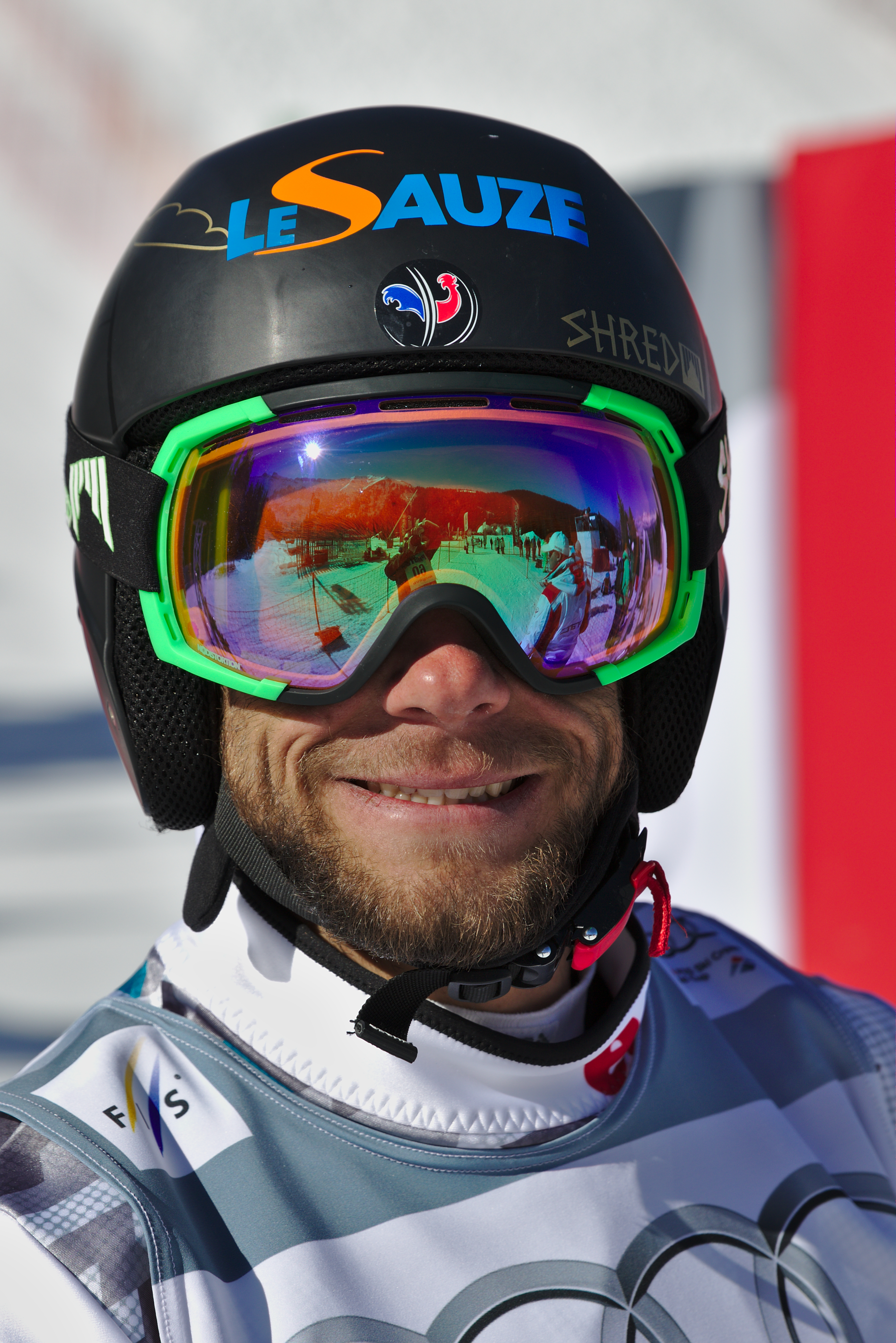
- Tchiknavorian in 2015

Personal information
- Born: 22 April 1992 (age 33) Avignon, France

Sport
- Country: France
- Sport: Freestyle skiing
- Event: Ski cross

Terence Tchiknavorian (born 22 April 1992) is a French freestyle skier.

== Career ==
He competed at the 2018, 2022, and 2026 Winter Olympics.
