= Zoe Atkin =

British freestyle skier (born 2003)

- Atkin in 2026

Personal information
- Citizenship: American; British
- Born: 16 January 2003 (age 23) Newton, Massachusetts, US

Sport
- Country: Great Britain
- Sport: Freestyle skiing
- Event: Halfpipe
Medal record
Women's freestyle skiing
Representing Great Britain
Olympic Games
Bronze medal – third place	2026 Milano Cortina	Halfpipe
World Championships
Gold medal – first place	2025 Engadin	Halfpipe
Silver medal – second place	2023 Bakuriani	Halfpipe
Bronze medal – third place	2021 Aspen	Halfpipe
Winter X Games
Gold medal – first place	2026 Aspen	Superpipe
Silver medal – second place	2024 Aspen	Superpipe
Gold medal – first place	2023 Aspen	Superpipe

Zoe Atkin (born 16 January 2003) is a British-American freestyle skier who competes for Great Britain. She won a bronze medal in the halfpipe at the 2026 Winter Olympics, and was the 2025 world champion in the same discipline. She is also a two-time Winter X Games winner in the superpipe.

Born in the United States to a British father and a Malaysian mother, she followed her sister Izzy into freestyle skiing, and won her first World Cup event in 2019. She won a bronze and a silver medal at the 2021 and 2023 World Championships respectively, before claiming the gold medal two years later. She shared the overall World Cup title with Li Fanghui in 2025, and won the competition outright in 2026. She attends Stanford University, studying symbolic systems, and was enrolled there when she competed at the 2026 Winter Olympics.

== Early life and education ==
Zoe Atkin was born on 16 January 2003 in Newton, Massachusetts. Her father is British and her mother is Malaysian. Atkin has dual British and US citizenship. She was raised on the East Coast of the United States until the age of 10, when her family moved to Park City, Utah, to give her and her older sister Izzy the best opportunity to simultaneously study and pursue their sporting aspirations. Atkin has credited her older sister as being inspirational for her, with Izzy earning a bronze medal in slopestyle at the 2018 Winter Olympics in Pyeongchang. Atkin is a graduate of the Winter Sports School, a specialized high school in Park City designed for student athletes. She enrolled at Stanford University in 2022, where she studied symbolic systems alongside her sporting career. She is a member of Stanford's Pi Beta Phi sorority.

== Career ==
Atkin competes for Great Britain. In the 2019–20 World Cup, aged 16, she won halfpipe gold in blizzard-like conditions at Copper Mountain. It was her third appearance at a World Cup event, and her victory meant she became the second British competitor to win a World Cup halfpipe event, and the first since Rowan Cheshire in 2014. She scored 87.75, finishing more than two points clear of American Brita Sigourney in second. In March 2021, Atkin secured a bronze medal at the World Championships in Aspen, after posting a score of 90.50 to finish behind China's Eileen Gu (93) and Canadian Rachael Karker (91.75). She then won a silver medal in the 2020–21 World Cup at the same venue. Atkin competed at the 2022 Winter Olympics in Beijing, placing ninth in the halfpipe competition.

During the 2022–23 World Cup, Atkin won a silver medal at Mammoth Mountain. She also won a silver medal in the halfpipe at the 2023 World Championships in Bakuriani, Georgia. After qualifying for the final in third place, Atkin scored 94.50 and finished runner-up to American Hanna Faulhaber who recorded 95.75. At the 2023 Winter X Games in Aspen, she won the superpipe gold medal. It was her first ever medal in the competition having previously posted three top-five finishes. She finished in front of Karker and American Svea Irving.

In the opening event of the 2023–24 World Cup at Copper Mountain, Atkin finished with a bronze medal. She won a silver medal in the superpipe at the 2024 Winter X Games. She ended the competition with a score of 90.66, five points behind Gu whom she called an "inspiration". The following month, she secured a bronze medal in the World Cup event at Mammoth Mountain after a snowstorm prevented the final from being staged. The results from the qualifying round were used to determine the standings. Later that month, Atkin won her third consecutive World Cup bronze at the event in Calgary, finishing behind Gu and Canadian Amy Fraser, before earning a silver medal at a second meeting in Calgary. She finished the World Cup series in third position overall.

In December 2024, Atkin won a silver medal behind Gu in the 2024–25 World Cup event in Copper Mountain, her first top-three finish of the season. At the X Games in January, she finished fourth in the superpipe. Returning to the World Cup series, Atkin achieved victory in Aspen, posting a score of 90 to beat China's Li Fanghui into silver. She finished runner-up to Li in Calgary, and the pair jointly won the Crystal Globe trophy, awarded to the competitor who tops the overall World Cup standings. Each recorded one victory and two second-place results across the series. This was the first time the trophy had been shared. In March 2025, Atkin won the gold medal at the World Championships in Engadin after recording a score of 93.50 in her second run. She won by half a point from Li.

In December 2025, Atkin finished runner-up to Gu at a 2025–26 World Cup event in China. The following week, she won a gold medal in the next leg of the series at Copper Mountain, her third career victory in a World Cup event. In January 2026, Atkin won the silver medal at the World Cup meeting in Aspen, before winning the gold medal in the superpipe at the 2026 X Games. She scored 94.66, with Australia's Indra Brown placing second with 90.

At the 2026 Winter Olympics in Italy, Atkin qualified for the halfpipe final in first place. The final was pushed back a day following heavy snowfall at Livigno Snow Park, and she won the bronze medal. Atkin led after scoring 90.5 in her opening run, but slipped to third overall after falling in her second. In her final run, she improved her score to 92.50, but it was not enough to catch Gu (94.75) and Li (93). She became the second Briton to win an Olympic medal on skis, matching her sister Izzy's bronze in the slopestyle in 2018. Returning to the World Cup circuit, Atkin claimed victory in Silvaplana. Her score of 86.75 saw her finish six points ahead of New Zealand's Mischa Thomas. She finished the World Cup series with a total of 360 points, 70 points ahead of Brown, to claim the overall World Cup title outright for the first time, having shared the trophy one year previously.

== Career results ==
=== Olympic timeline ===
Year	Event	Location	Best Score	Position	Ref
2022	Ski halfpipe	(China) Beijing	73.25	9th	
2026	Ski halfpipe	(Italy) Livigno Snow Park	92.50	3rd	

=== World Championship medals ===
Year	Event	Location	Best Score	Position	Ref
2021	Ski halfpipe	(United States) Aspen	90.50	3rd	
2023	Ski halfpipe	(Georgia (country)) Bakuriani	94.50	2nd	
2025	Ski halfpipe	(Switzerland) Engadin	93.50	1st	

=== X Games medals ===
Year	Event	Location	Best Score	Position	Ref
2023	Superpipe	(United States) Aspen		1st	
2024	Superpipe	(United States) Aspen	90.66	2nd	
2026	Superpipe	(United States) Aspen	94.66	1st	

=== World Cup medals ===
Year	Event	Location	Best Score	Position	Ref
2019–20	Ski halfpipe	(United States) Copper Mountain	87.75	1st	
2020–21	Ski halfpipe	(United States) Aspen	91.50	2nd	
2022–23	Ski halfpipe	(United States) Mammoth Mountain	92.75	2nd	
2023–24	Ski halfpipe	(United States) Copper Mountain	91	3rd	
2023–24	Ski halfpipe	(United States) Mammoth Mountain	82.50	3rd	
2023–24	Ski halfpipe	(Canada) Calgary	88	3rd	
2023–24	Ski halfpipe	(Canada) Calgary	92	2nd	
2024–25	Ski halfpipe	(United States) Copper Mountain	89.75	2nd	
2024–25	Ski halfpipe	(United States) Aspen	90	1st	
2024–25	Ski halfpipe	(Canada) Calgary	87.75	2nd	
2025–26	Ski halfpipe	(China) Secret Garden	90.25	2nd	
2025–26	Ski halfpipe	(United States) Copper Mountain	89.25	1st	
2025–26	Ski halfpipe	(United States) Aspen	92.75	2nd	
2025–26	Ski halfpipe	(Switzerland) Silvaplana	86.75	1st	
