= Freestyle skiing at the 2026 Winter Olympics – Women's halfpipe =

Women's halfpipe at the XXV Olympic Winter Games
- Freestyle skiing
- Venue: Livigno Snow Park, Valtellina
- Date: 19, 22 February 2026
- Competitors: 21 from 10 nations
- Winning score: 94.75

Medalists
| 1st place, gold medalist(s) | | Eileen Gu | China |
| 2nd place, silver medalist(s) | | Li Fanghui | China |
| 3rd place, bronze medalist(s) | | Zoe Atkin | Great Britain |

The women's halfpipe competition in freestyle skiing at the 2026 Winter Olympics was held on 19 February (qualification) and 22 February (final), 2026 at the Livigno Snow Park in Valtellina. 2022 champion Eileen Gu of China defended her title, with her compatriot Li Fanghui finishing second and Great Britain's Zoe Atkin coming third. Li and Atkin received their first Olympic medals.

== Background ==
The 2022 champion, Eileen Gu, qualified for the event, as did the 2018 champion and 2022 silver medalist, Cassie Sharpe. The 2022 Olympic bronze medalist, Rachael Karker was also a qualifier. Indra Brown was leading the halfpipe standings of the 2025–26 FIS Freestyle Ski World Cup before the Olympics. Zoe Atkin was the 2025 World champion.

== Results ==
=== Qualification ===
During halfpipe qualifiers, Gu crashed on her first run but recovered in a strong second run. Gu placed fifth with a score of 86.5 behind Zoe Atkin (91.5) and Li Fanghui (90). Cassie Sharpe suffered a crash resulting in injury, causing her to miss the finals.

Q — Qualified for the Final

The top 12 athletes in the qualifiers advance to the medal round.

| Rank | Bib | Order | Name | Country | Run 1 | Run 2 | Best | Notes |
|---|---|---|---|---|---|---|---|---|
| 1 | 1 | 10 | Zoe Atkin | Great Britain | 91.50 | DNI | 91.50 | Q |
| 2 | 4 | 3 | Li Fanghui | China | 85.00 | 90.00 | 90.00 | Q |
| 3 | 7 | 7 | Cassie Sharpe | Canada | 88.25 | DNI | 88.25 | Q |
| 4 | 3 | 2 | Indra Brown | Australia | 80.75 | 87.50 | 87.50 | Q |
| 5 | 2 | 1 | Eileen Gu | China | 16.25 | 86.50 | 86.50 | Q |
| 6 | 5 | 8 | Zhang Kexin | China | 82.75 | DNI | 82.75 | Q |
| 7 | 9 | 9 | Amy Fraser | Canada | 79.00 | 81.75 | 81.75 | Q |
| 8 | 8 | 6 | Svea Irving | United States | 77.75 | 80.75 | 80.75 | Q |
| 9 | 6 | 4 | Rachael Karker | Canada | 74.50 | 78.25 | 78.25 | Q |
| 10 | 12 | 19 | Mischa Thomas | New Zealand | 77.00 | 77.50 | 77.50 | Q |
| 11 | 11 | 14 | Liu Yishan | China | 76.00 | DNI | 76.00 | Q |
| 12 | 14 | 11 | Kate Gray | United States | 5.25 | 74.75 | 74.75 | Q |
| 13 | 16 | 12 | Kelly Sildaru | Estonia | 69.25 | 73.75 | 73.75 | |
| 14 | 15 | 16 | Dillan Glennie | Canada | 73.00 | DNI | 73.00 | |
| 15 | 13 | 18 | Abby Winterberger | United States | 72.25 | 72.50 | 72.50 | |
| 16 | 17 | 15 | Sabrina Cakmakli | Germany | 71.50 | DNI | 71.50 | |
| 17 | 20 | 17 | Grete-Mia Meentalo | Estonia | 61.50 | DNI | 61.50 | |
| 18 | 10 | 5 | Riley Jacobs | United States | 56.50 | DNI | 56.50 | |
| 19 | 18 | 13 | Nanaho Kiriyama | Japan | 49.75 | 52.50 | 52.50 | |
| 20 | 19 | 20 | Kim Dae-un | South Korea | 23.25 | 41.50 | 41.50 | |
| 21 | 21 | 21 | Lee So-young | South Korea | 26.75 | 29.25 | 29.25 | |

=== Final ===
| Rank | Bib | Order | Name | Country | Run 1 | Run 2 | Run 3 | Best |
|---|---|---|---|---|---|---|---|---|
| 1st place, gold medalist(s) | 2 | 8 | Eileen Gu | China | 30.00 | 94.00 | 94.75 | 94.75 |
| 2nd place, silver medalist(s) | 4 | 11 | Li Fanghui | China | 81.25 | 91.50 | 93.00 | 93.00 |
| 3rd place, bronze medalist(s) | 1 | 12 | Zoe Atkin | Great Britain | 90.50 | DNI | 92.50 | 92.50 |
| 4 | 9 | 6 | Amy Fraser | Canada | 85.00 | DNI | 88.00 | 88.00 |
| 5 | 3 | 9 | Indra Brown | Australia | 55.50 | 65.00 | 87.00 | 87.00 |
| 6 | 5 | 7 | Zhang Kexin | China | 24.25 | 26.25 | 83.25 | 83.25 |
| 7 | 6 | 4 | Rachael Karker | Canada | 5.00 | 79.50 | DNI | 79.50 |
| 8 | 12 | 3 | Mischa Thomas | New Zealand | 77.75 | DNI | DNI | 77.75 |
| 9 | 11 | 2 | Liu Yishan | China | 70.00 | DNI | 71.75 | 71.75 |
| 10 | 14 | 1 | Kate Gray | United States | 44.50 | DNI | 66.50 | 66.50 |
| 11 | 8 | 5 | Svea Irving | United States | 17.25 | DNS | 22.50 | 22.50 |
| DNS | 7 | 10 | Cassie Sharpe | Canada | – | – | – | DNS |
