= FIS Freestyle Ski and Snowboarding World Championships 2017 – Women's ski halfpipe =

The women's ski halfpipe competition of the FIS Freestyle Ski and Snowboarding World Championships 2017 was held at Sierra Nevada, Spain on March 16 (qualifying) and March 18 (finals). 25 athletes from 12 countries competed.

== Qualification ==
The following are the results of the qualification.

Rank	Bib	Name	Country	Run 1	Run 2	Best	Notes
1	1	Marie Martinod	France	88.00	90.60	90.60	Q
2	2	Ayana Onozuka	Japan	84.20	88.60	88.60	Q
3	3	Annalisa Drew	United States	84.60	24.80	84.60	Q
4	6	Devin Logan	United States	83.80	82.40	83.80	Q
5	11	Rowan Cheshire	Great Britain	82.20	80.60	82.20	Q
6	5	Maddie Bowman	United States	77.20	74.80	77.20	Q
7	9	Rosalind Groenewoud	Canada	76.40	4.60	76.40	
8	10	Janina Kuzma	New Zealand	76.00	71.00	76.00	
9	7	Brita Sigourney	United States	74.80	60.00	74.80	
10	14	Yurie Watabe	Japan	73.20	9.80	73.20	
11	16	Madison Rowlands	Great Britain	63.60	69.40	69.40	
12	20	Valeria Demidova	Russia	67.20	19.80	67.20	
13	25	Elizavetta Chesnokova	Russia	65.00	65.00	65.00	
14	15	Keltie Hansen	Canada	61.00	48.20	61.00	
15	21	Molly Summerhayes	Great Britain	60.40	43.40	60.40	
16	18	Polina Agntseva	Russia	56.00	48.40	56.00	
17	17	Brittany Hawes	New Zealand	50.00	43.00	50.00	
18	23	Chai Hong	China	42.80	44.00	44.00	
19	19	Jang Yu-Jin	South Korea	15.00	40.80	40.80	
20	22	Laila Friis-Salling	Denmark	38.40	4.20	38.40	
21	24	Elizabeth Swaney	Hungary	32.00	30.20	32.00	
22	13	Megan Warrener	Canada	22.80	8.80	22.80	
23	12	Anaïs Caradeux	France	21.40	17.00	21.40	
24	8	Sabrina Cakmakli	Germany	18.60	18.80	18.80	
25	4	Cassie Sharpe	Canada	5.40	12.80	12.80	

== Final ==
The following are the results of the finals.

Rank	Bib	Name	Country	Run 1	Run 2	Run 3	Best
1st place, gold medalist(s)	2	Ayana Onozuka	Japan	80.00	89.80	88.20	89.80
2nd place, silver medalist(s)	1	Marie Martinod	France	87.00	85.00	69.20	87.00
3rd place, bronze medalist(s)	6	Devin Logan	United States	79.20	30.60	84.20	84.20
4	3	Annalisa Drew	United States	81.80	17.60	63.00	81.80
5	5	Maddie Bowman	United States	75.20	50.80	76.60	76.60
6	11	Rowan Cheshire	Great Britain	26.80	24.40	14.00	26.80
