= FIS Freestyle Ski and Snowboarding World Championships 2021 – Women's ski halfpipe =

Women's ski halfpipe at the FIS Freestyle Ski and Snowboarding World Championships 2021
- Venue: Aspen/Snowmass
- Location: Aspen, United States
- Date: 10 March (qualification); 12 March
- Competitors: 15 from 9 nations
- Winning points: 93.00

Medalists
gold medal	Gu Ailing	China
silver medal	Rachael Karker	Canada
bronze medal	Zoe Atkin	Great Britain

The Women's ski halfpipe competition at the FIS Freestyle Ski and Snowboarding World Championships 2021 was held on 12 March. A qualification was held on 10 March 2021.

== Qualification ==
The qualification was started on 10 March at 09:30. The best eight skiers qualified for the final.

Rank	Bib	Start order	Name	Country	Run 1	Run 2	Best	Notes
1	3	4	Rachael Karker	Canada	93.00	94.25	94.25	Q
2	5	5	Zoe Atkin	Great Britain	86.00	87.75	87.75	Q
3	1	8	Valeriya Demidova	Russian Ski Federation	82.50	85.50	85.50	Q
4	6	10	Brita Sigourney	United States	84.00	82.00	84.00	Q
5	11	7	Hanna Faulhaber	United States	75.25	81.25	81.25	Q
6	8	3	Devin Logan	United States	80.25	7.25	80.25	Q
7	2	6	Gu Ailing	China	77.00	53.75	77.00	Q
8	10	2	Saori Suzuki	Japan	73.75	74.25	74.25	Q
9	13	15	Amy Fraser	Canada	69.50	24.75	69.50	
10	12	14	Svea Irving	United States	63.50	67.75	67.75	
11	9	1	Sabrina Cakmakli	Germany	67.25	5.50	67.25	
12	7	9	Jang Yu-jin	South Korea	6.00	59.00	59.00	
13	48	11	Constance Brogden	Great Britain	58.25	12.25	58.25	
14	14	12	Chloe McMillan	New Zealand	44.00	43.50	44.00	
15	16	13	Anja Barugh	New Zealand	38.75	37.25	38.75	

== Final ==
The final was started at 13:00.

Rank	Bib	Start order	Name	Country	Run 1	Run 2	Run 3	Best
1st place, gold medalist(s)	2	2	Gu Ailing	China	93.00	92.50	89.00	93.00
2nd place, silver medalist(s)	3	8	Rachael Karker	Canada	8.50	87.25	91.75	91.75
3rd place, bronze medalist(s)	5	7	Zoe Atkin	Great Britain	72.50	89.00	90.50	90.50
4	11	4	Hanna Faulhaber	United States	82.50	84.25	86.75	86.75
5	6	5	Brita Sigourney	United States	86.25	18.50	51.75	86.25
6	8	3	Devin Logan	United States	79.00	79.25	78.00	79.25
7	1	6	Valeriya Demidova	Russian Ski Federation	75.00	42.75	15.00	75.00
8	10	1	Saori Suzuki	Japan	70.25	13.00	73.00	73.00
