= 2019–20 FIS Freestyle Ski World Cup =

Freestyle skiing competitive season

Freestyle Ski World Cup 2019/20
Discipline	Men	Women
Overall	(Canada) Mikaël Kingsbury (9)	(France) Perrine Laffont (2)
Ski Cross	(Canada) Kevin Drury	(Sweden) Sandra Näslund (2)
Moguls	(Canada) Mikaël Kingsbury (9)	(France) Perrine Laffont (3)
Aerials	(Switzerland) Noé Roth	(Australia) Laura Peel
Halfpipe	(United States) Aaron Blunck	(Russia) Valeriya Demidova
Slopestyle	(Switzerland) Andri Ragettli (3)	(Switzerland) Sarah Höfflin (2)
Big Air	(Norway) Birk Ruud	(Switzerland) Giulia Tanno
Cross Alps Tour	(Canada) Kevin Drury	(Sweden) Sandra Näslund (3)
- Nations Cup overall: Canada (12)

Competition
Locations	30 venues	29 venues
Individual	41 events	40 events
Team	1/1	1/1

The 2019/20 FIS Freestyle Ski World Cup was a World Cup season in freestyle skiing organised by International Ski Federation. The season started on 6 September 2019 and finished on 8 March 2020. This season include six disciplines: moguls, aerials, ski cross, halfpipe, slopestyle and big air.

== Men ==
=== Ski Cross ===
Num	Season	Date	Place	Event	Winner	Second	Third
157	1	6 December 2019	(France) Val Thorens	SX	(Canada) Kevin Drury	(France) Youri Duplessis Kergomard	(Switzerland) Ryan Regez
158	2	7 December 2019	(France) Val Thorens	SX	(Canada) Kristofor Mahler	(France) Bastien Midol	(Switzerland) Joos Berry
159	3	14 December 2019	(Austria) Montafon	SX	(Switzerland) Ryan Regez	(Canada) Kristofor Mahler	(Canada) Brady Leman
160	4	17 December 2019	(Switzerland) Arosa	SX	(Canada) Kevin Drury	(Sweden) Viktor Andersson	(Switzerland) Alex Fiva
161	5	21 December 2019	(Italy) Innichen	SX	(Canada) Kevin Drury	(Germany) Florian Wilmsmann	(France) Jonathan Midol
162	6	22 December 2019	(Italy) Innichen	SX	(Switzerland) Joos Berry	(France) Bastien Midol	(Switzerland) Jonas Lenherr
4th Cross Alps Tour Overall (5–22 December 2019)					(Canada) Kevin Drury	(Canada) Kristofor Mahler	(France) Bastien Midol
163	7	18 January 2020	(Canada) Nakiska	SX	(Canada) Reece Howden	(Canada) Kevin Drury	(Germany) Daniel Bohnacker
164	8	25 January 2020	(Sweden) Idre	SX	(Switzerland) Ryan Regez	(Canada) Brady Leman	(France) François Place
165	9	26 January 2020	(Sweden) Idre	SX	(Germany) Daniel Bohnacker	(Canada) Kevin Drury	(Switzerland) Ryan Regez
166	10	1 February 2020	(France) Megève	SX	(Canada) Kevin Drury	(France) Bastien Midol	(Germany) Tim Hronek
167	11	23 February 2020	(Russia) Sunny Valley	SX	(Switzerland) Marc Bischofberger	(Canada) Kevin Drury	(France) Arnaud Bovolenta

=== Moguls ===
Num	Season	Date	Place	Event	Winner	Second	Third
340	1	7 December 2019	(Finland) Ruka	MO	(Canada) Mikaël Kingsbury	(Japan) Ikuma Horishima	(Sweden) Walter Wallberg
341	2	14 December 2019	(China) Thaiwoo	MO	(Japan) Ikuma Horishima	(Canada) Mikaël Kingsbury	(France) Benjamin Cavet
342	3	25 January 2020	(Canada) Mont-Tremblant	MO	(Canada) Mikaël Kingsbury	(Japan) Ikuma Horishima	(France) Benjamin Cavet
343	4	1 February 2020	(Canada) Calgary	MO	(Canada) Mikaël Kingsbury	(Sweden) Walter Wallberg	(Kazakhstan) Dmitriy Reiherd
344	5	6 February 2020	(United States) Deer Valley	MO	(Japan) Ikuma Horishima	(Canada) Mikaël Kingsbury	(Sweden) Felix Elofsson
345	6	22 February 2020	(Japan) Tazawako	MO	(Canada) Mikaël Kingsbury	(Kazakhstan) Dmitriy Reiherd	(Canada) Laurent Dumais

=== Dual Moguls ===
Num	Season	Date	Place	Event	Winner	Second	Third
72	1	15 December 2019	(China) Thaiwoo	DM	(Canada) Mikaël Kingsbury	(France) Benjamin Cavet	(Japan) Ikuma Horishima
73	2	8 February 2020	(United States) Deer Valley	DM	(Canada) Mikaël Kingsbury	(France) Benjamin Cavet	(Sweden) Walter Wallberg
74	3	1 March 2020	(Kazakhstan) Shymbulak	DM	(Japan) Ikuma Horishima	(Canada) Mikaël Kingsbury	(Canada) Laurent Dumais
75	4	7 March 2020	(Russia) Krasnoyarsk	DM	(Canada) Mikaël Kingsbury	(United Kingdom) Thomas Gerken Schofield	(United States) Bradley Wilson

=== Aerials ===
Num	Season	Date	Place	Event	Winner	Second	Third
336	1	21 December 2019	(China) Shimao Lotus Mountain	AE	(China) Qi Guangpu	(China) Jia Zongyang	(Switzerland) Noé Roth
337	2	22 December 2019	(China) Shimao Lotus Mountain	AE	(China) Qi Guangpu	(Russia) Maxim Burov	(China) Jia Zongyang
338	3	7 February 2020	(United States) Deer Valley	AE	(Russia) Maxim Burov	(Switzerland) Noé Roth	(Russia) Ilya Burov
339	4	15 February 2020	(Russia) Moscow	AE	(Russia) Pavel Krotov	(Switzerland) Noé Roth	(Belarus) Pavel Dzik
340	5	22 February 2020	(Belarus) Minsk	AE	(United States) Justin Schoenefeld	(Canada) Lewis Irving	(United States) Christopher Lillis
341	6	28 February 2020	(Kazakhstan) Almaty	AE	(United States) Christopher Lillis	(Switzerland) Pirmin Werner	(Belarus) Pavel Dzik
342	7	8 March 2020	(Russia) Krasnoyarsk	AE	(Switzerland) Noé Roth	(Russia) Pavel Krotov	(Canada) Lewis Irving

=== Halfpipe ===
Num	Season	Date	Place	Event	Winner	Second	Third
48	1	7 September 2019	(New Zealand) Cardrona	HP	(United States) Birk Irving	(Canada) Noah Bowman	(United States) Aaron Blunck
49	2	13 December 2019	(United States) Copper Mountain	HP	(United States) Aaron Blunck	(United States) David Wise	(Canada) Noah Bowman
50	3	20 December 2019	(China) Secret Garden	HP	(Canada) Noah Bowman	(United States) Aaron Blunck	(United States) Lyman Currier
51	4	1 February 2020	(United States) Mammoth	HP	(United States) Aaron Blunck	(Canada) Noah Bowman	(United States) Lyman Currier
52	5	14 February 2020	(Canada) Calgary	HP	(United Kingdom) Gus Kenworthy	(Canada) Brendan Mackay	(United States) Birk Irving

=== Slopestyle ===
Num	Season	Date	Place	Event	Winner	Second	Third
35	1	11 January 2020	(France) Font Romeu	SS	(Canada) Mark Hendrickson	(Sweden) Jesper Tjäder	(United States) Cody Laplante
36	2	18 January 2020	(Italy) Seiser Alm	SS	(Norway) Birk Ruud	(Switzerland) Fabian Bösch	(United States) Colby Stevenson
37	3	31 January 2020	(United States) Mammoth	SS	(Switzerland) Andri Ragettli	(United States) Colby Stevenson	(United States) Deven Fagan
38	4	15 February 2020	(Canada) Calgary	SS	(Switzerland) Andri Ragettli	(United States) Colby Stevenson	(United States) Nicholas Goepper

=== Big Air ===
Num	Season	Date	Place	Event	Winner	Second	Third
14	1	3 November 2019	(Italy) Modena	BA	(United States) Alexander Hall	(Norway) Birk Ruud	(Switzerland) Andri Ragettli
15	2	14 December 2019	(China) Beijing	BA	(Norway) Birk Ruud	(Canada) Teal Harle	(Sweden) Jesper Tjäder
16	3	21 December 2019	(United States) Atlanta	BA	(United States) Alexander Hall	(France) Antoine Adelisse	(Canada) Teal Harle
17	4	29 February 2020	(Czech Republic) Deštné	BA	(France) Antoine Adelisse	(Norway) Birk Ruud	(Norway) Ulrik Samnøy

== Ladies ==
=== Ski Cross ===
Num	Season	Date	Place	Event	Winner	Second	Third
157	1	6 December 2019	(France) Val Thorens	SX	(Sweden) Sandra Näslund	(Canada) Courtney Hoffos	(Canada) India Sherret
158	2	7 December 2019	(France) Val Thorens	SX	(Switzerland) Fanny Smith	(Sweden) Sandra Näslund	(Canada) Courtney Hoffos
159	3	14 December 2019	(Austria) Montafon	SX	(Canada) Marielle Thompson	(Sweden) Sandra Näslund	(Canada) Courtney Hoffos
160	4	17 December 2019	(Switzerland) Arosa	SX	(Canada) Marielle Thompson	(Switzerland) Fanny Smith	(Sweden) Sandra Näslund
161	5	21 December 2019	(Italy) Innichen	SX	(France) Marielle Berger Sabbatel	(Sweden) Sandra Näslund	(Canada) Brittany Phelan
162	6	22 December 2019	(Italy) Innichen	SX	(Switzerland) Fanny Smith	(Canada) Marielle Thompson	(Germany) Daniela Maier
4th Cross Alps Tour Overall (5–22 December 2019)					(Sweden) Sandra Näslund	(Switzerland) Fanny Smith	(Canada) Marielle Thompson
163	7	18 January 2020	(Canada) Nakiska	SX	(Sweden) Sandra Näslund	(Canada) Brittany Phelan	(Switzerland) Fanny Smith
164	8	25 January 2020	(Sweden) Idre	SX	(Switzerland) Fanny Smith	(Sweden) Sandra Näslund	(Canada) Brittany Phelan
165	9	26 January 2020	(Sweden) Idre	SX	(Sweden) Sandra Näslund	(Switzerland) Fanny Smith	(Canada) Marielle Thompson
166	10	1 February 2020	(France) Megève	SX	(Canada) Marielle Thompson	(Sweden) Sandra Näslund	(Sweden) Alexandra Edebo
167	11	23 February 2020	(Russia) Sunny Valley	SX	(Switzerland) Fanny Smith	(France) Marielle Berger Sabbatel	(Germany) Daniela Maier

=== Moguls ===
Num	Season	Date	Place	Event	Winner	Second	Third
340	1	7 December 2019	(Finland) Ruka	MO	(France) Perrine Laffont	(Japan) Anri Kawamura	(Australia) Britteny Cox
341	2	14 December 2019	(China) Thaiwoo	MO	(France) Perrine Laffont	(Kazakhstan) Yulia Galysheva	(Canada) Justine Dufour-Lapointe
342	3	25 January 2020	(Canada) Mont-Tremblant	MO	(France) Perrine Laffont	(Kazakhstan) Yulia Galysheva	(Russia) Anastasia Smirnova
343	4	1 February 2020	(Canada) Calgary	MO	(France) Perrine Laffont	(Kazakhstan) Yulia Galysheva	(Canada) Justine Dufour-Lapointe
344	5	6 February 2020	(United States) Deer Valley	MO	(France) Perrine Laffont	(Australia) Jakara Anthony	(Canada) Justine Dufour-Lapointe
345	6	22 February 2020	(Japan) Tazawako	MO	(France) Perrine Laffont	(Japan) Junko Hoshino	(Australia) Jakara Anthony

=== Dual Moguls ===
Num	Season	Date	Place	Event	Winner	Second	Third
71	1	15 December 2019	(China) Thaiwoo	DM	(France) Perrine Laffont	(United States) Jaelin Kauf	(United States) Hannah Soar
72	2	8 February 2020	(United States) Deer Valley	DM	(Canada) Justine Dufour-Lapointe	(United States) Hannah Soar	(United States) Jaelin Kauf
73	3	1 March 2020	(Kazakhstan) Shymbulak	DM	(United States) Jaelin Kauf	(Australia) Jakara Anthony	(France) Perrine Laffont
74	4	7 March 2020	(Russia) Krasnoyarsk	DM	(France) Perrine Laffont	(Australia) Jakara Anthony	(United States) Jaelin Kauf

=== Aerials ===
Num	Season	Date	Place	Event	Winner	Second	Third
336	1	21 December 2019	(China) Shimao Lotus Mountain	AE	(China) Xu Mengtao	(Belarus) Aliaksandra Ramanouskaya	(Australia) Laura Peel
337	2	22 December 2019	(China) Shimao Lotus Mountain	AE	(China) Xu Mengtao	(Belarus) Aliaksandra Ramanouskaya	(China) Kong Fanyu
338	3	7 February 2020	(United States) Deer Valley	AE	(Belarus) Aliaksandra Ramanouskaya	(United States) Megan Nick	(Australia) Abbey Willcox
339	4	15 February 2020	(Russia) Moscow	AE	(Belarus) Hanna Huskova	(Australia) Laura Peel	(Russia) Sofia Alekseeva
340	5	22 February 2020	(Belarus) Minsk	AE	(Australia) Laura Peel	(China) Xu Mengtao	(China) Xu Sicun
341	6	28 February 2020	(Kazakhstan) Almaty	AE	(Ukraine) Nadiya Mokhnatska	(United States) Megan Nick	(Kazakhstan) Zhanbota Aldabergenova
342	7	8 March 2020	(Russia) Krasnoyarsk	AE	(Australia) Laura Peel	(China) Xu Sicun	(United States) Ashley Caldwell

=== Halfpipe ===
Num	Season	Date	Place	Event	Winner	Second	Third
48	1	7 September 2019	(New Zealand) Cardrona	HP	(China) Zhang Kexin	(China) Eileen Gu	(Russia) Valeriya Demidova
49	2	13 December 2019	(United States) Copper Mountain	HP	(United Kingdom) Zoe Atkin	(United States) Brita Sigourney	(Canada) Rachael Karker
50	3	20 December 2019	(China) Secret Garden	HP	(Russia) Valeriya Demidova	(Canada) Rachael Karker	(China) Fanghui Li
51	4	1 February 2020	(United States) Mammoth	HP	(Canada) Cassie Sharpe	(Russia) Valeriya Demidova	(Canada) Rachael Karker
52	5	14 February 2020	(Canada) Calgary	HP	(China) Eileen Gu	(Canada) Rachael Karker	(Russia) Valeriya Demidova

=== Slopestyle ===
Num	Season	Date	Place	Event	Winner	Second	Third
35	1	11 January 2020	(France) Font Romeu	SS	(France) Tess Ledeux	(Switzerland) Giulia Tanno	(Switzerland) Sarah Höfflin
36	2	18 January 2020	(Italy) Seiser Alm	SS	(United States) Caroline Claire	(Norway) Johanne Killi	(Canada) Elena Gaskell
37	3	31 January 2020	(United States) Mammoth	SS	(Switzerland) Sarah Höfflin	(United Kingdom) Isabel Atkin	(United States) Maggie Voisin
38	4	15 February 2020	(Canada) Calgary	SS	(China) Eileen Gu	(Switzerland) Mathilde Gremaud	(Canada) Megan Oldham

=== Big Air ===
Num	Season	Date	Place	Event	Winner	Second	Third
14	1	3 November 2019	(Italy) Modena	BA	(Switzerland) Mathilde Gremaud	(Switzerland) Giulia Tanno	(Canada) Dara Howell
15	2	14 December 2019	(China) Beijing	BA	(Norway) Johanne Killi	(Switzerland) Giulia Tanno	(Italy) Silvia Bertagna
16	3	21 December 2019	(United States) Atlanta	BA	(Switzerland) Mathilde Gremaud	(Switzerland) Giulia Tanno	(United Kingdom) Isabel Atkin

== Team ==
=== Team Aerials ===
Num	Season	Date	Place	Event	Winner	Second	Third
342	1	22 December 2019	(China) Shimao Lotus Mountain	AET	Russia Liubov Nikitina; Pavel Krotov; Maxim Burov	China II Kong Fanyu; Yang Longxiao; Sun Jiaxu	China I Xu Mengtao; Qi Guangpu; Jia Zongyang

== Men's standings ==
=== Overall ===
Rank	after all 41 races	Points
1	(Canada) Mikaël Kingsbury	94.00
2	(Canada) Noah Bowman	73.00
3	(United States) Aaron Blunck	72.00
4	(Canada) Kevin Drury	69.82
5	(Japan) Ikuma Horishima	63.90

=== Ski Cross ===
Rank	after all 11 races	Points
1	(Canada) Kevin Drury	768
2	(Switzerland) Ryan Regez	454
3	(Canada) Brady Leman	428
4	(France) Bastien Midol	406
5	(Germany) Florian Wilmsmann	342

=== Ski Cross Alps Tour ===
Rank	after all 6 races	Points
1	(Canada) Kevin Drury	396
2	(Canada) Kristofor Mahler	302
3	(France) Bastien Midol	248
4	(Switzerland) Ryan Regez	239
5	(Germany) Florian Wilmsmann	220

=== Moguls ===
Rank	after all 10 races	Points
1	(Canada) Mikaël Kingsbury	940
2	(Japan) Ikuma Horishima	639
3	(France) Benjamin Cavet	531
4	(Kazakhstan) Dmitriy Reikherd	362
5	(Australia) Matt Graham	331

=== Aerials ===
Rank	after all 7 races	Points
1	(Switzerland) Noé Roth	386
2	(Russia) Pavel Krotov	334
3	(Russia) Maxim Burov	323
4	(Switzerland) Pirmin Werner	284
5	(Canada) Lewis Irving	267

=== Halfpipe ===
Rank	after all 5 races	Points
1	(United States) Aaron Blunck	360
2	(Canada) Noah Bowman	320
3	(United States) Birk Irving	260
4	(Canada) Brendan Mackay	215
5	(United States) Lyman Currier	178

=== Slopestyle ===
Rank	after all 4 races	Points
1	(Switzerland) Andri Ragettli	265
2	(United States) Colby Stevenson	220
3	(Switzerland) Fabian Bösch	199
4	(Norway) Birk Ruud	158
5	(Canada) Mark Hendrickson	146

=== Big Air ===
Rank	after all 4 races	Points
1	(Norway) Birk Ruud	310
2	(United States) Alexander Hall	240
3	(France) Antoine Adelisse	188
4	(Canada) Teal Harle	185
5	(Finland) Elias Syrja	144

== Ladies' standings ==
=== Overall ===
Rank	after all 40 races	Points
1	(France) Perrine Laffont	89.60
2	(Sweden) Sandra Näslund	77.73
3	(Switzerland) Fanny Smith	72.36
4	(Russia) Valeriya Demidova	69.00
5	(Australia) Laura Peel	67.00

=== Ski Cross ===
Rank	after all 11 races	Points
1	(Sweden) Sandra Näslund	855
2	(Switzerland) Fanny Smith	796
3	(Canada) Marielle Thompson	709
4	(France) Marielle Berger Sabbatel	503
5	(Sweden) Alexandra Edebo	445

=== Ski Cross Alps Tour ===
Rank	after all 6 races	Points
1	(Sweden) Sandra Näslund	450
2	(Switzerland) Fanny Smith	411
3	(Canada) Marielle Thompson	404
4	(Canada) Courtney Hoffos	275
5	(France) Marielle Berger Sabbatel	251

=== Moguls ===
Rank	after all 10 races	Points
1	(France) Perrine Laffont	896
2	(Australia) Jakara Anthony	564
3	(United States) Jaelin Kauf	470
4	(Canada) Justine Dufour-Lapointe	460
5	(United States) Hannah Soar	423

=== Aerials ===
Rank	after all 7 races	Points
1	(Australia) Laura Peel	469
2	(China) Xu Mengtao	351
3	(Belarus) Aliaksandra Ramanouskaya	260
4	(United States) Megan Nick	254
5	(China) Xu Sicun	214

=== Halfpipe ===
Rank	after all 5 races	Points
1	(Russia) Valeriya Demidova	300
2	(Canada) Rachael Karker	280
3	(China) Kexin Zhang	240
4	(China) Fanghui Li	205
5	(China) Eileen Gu	180

=== Slopestyle ===
Rank	after all 4 races	Points
1	(Switzerland) Sarah Höfflin	192
2	(United States) Marin Hamill	161
3	(Norway) Johanne Killi	154
4	(Switzerland) Mathilde Gremaud	146
5	(Switzerland) Giulia Tanno	133

=== Big Air ===
Rank	after all 3 races	Points
1	(Switzerland) Giulia Tanno	240
2	(Switzerland) Mathilde Gremaud	200
3	(Norway) Johanne Killi	195
4	(Canada) Megan Oldham	121
5	(Italy) Silvia Bertagna	115

== Nations Cup ==
=== Overall ===
Rank	after all 82 races	Points
1	Canada	7485
2	United States	4992
3	Switzerland	4667
4	France	3864
5	Sweden	3040
