= Freestyle skiing at the 2022 Winter Olympics – Women's halfpipe =

Women's halfpipe at the XXIV Olympic Winter Games
- Freestyle skiing
- Venue: Genting Snow Park, Zhangjiakou
- Date: 17, 18 February 2022
- Competitors: 20 from 10 nations
- Winning score: 95.25

Medalists
| 1st place, gold medalist(s) | | Eileen Gu | China |
| 2nd place, silver medalist(s) | | Cassie Sharpe | Canada |
| 3rd place, bronze medalist(s) | | Rachael Karker | Canada |

The women's halfpipe competition in freestyle skiing at the 2022 Winter Olympics was held on 17 February (qualification) and 18 February (final), at the Genting Snow Park in Zhangjiakou. Eileen Gu of China won the event, her second gold medal at these Games. The defending champion, Cassie Sharpe of Canada, returned and won silver. Rachael Karker of Canada won bronze, her first Olympic medal.

The 2018 silver medalist, Marie Martinod, retired from competitions, and the bronze medalist, Brita Sigourney, returned and placed tenth. At the 2021–22 FIS Freestyle Ski World Cup, there were four events held before the Olympics, all won by Eileen Gu. Gu was therefore the first in the ranking, followed by Hanna Faulhaber and Karker. Gu was also the 2021 X-Games winner in super-pipe, as well as the 2021 world champion.

== Qualification ==
A total of 25 athletes qualified to compete at the games. For an athlete to compete they must have a minimum of 50.00 FIS points on the FIS Points List on January 17, 2022, and a top 30 finish in a World Cup event or at the FIS Freestyle Ski World Championships 2021. A country could enter a maximum of four athletes into the event.

== Results ==
=== Qualification ===
Q — Qualified for the Final

The top 12 athletes in the qualifiers moved on to the medal round.

| Rank | Bib | Order | Name | Country | Run 1 | Run 2 | Best | Notes |
|---|---|---|---|---|---|---|---|---|
| 1 | 1 | 3 | Eileen Gu | China | 93.75 | 95.50 | 95.50 | Q |
| 2 | 3 | 2 | Rachael Karker | Canada | 88.50 | 89.50 | 89.50 | Q |
| 3 | 8 | 9 | Kelly Sildaru | Estonia | 87.50 | DNS | 87.50 | Q |
| 4 | 2 | 5 | Zoe Atkin | Great Britain | 85.25 | 86.75 | 86.75 | Q |
| 5 | 6 | 15 | Zhang Kexin | China | 77.50 | 86.50 | 86.50 | Q |
| 6 | 4 | 4 | Cassie Sharpe | Canada | 86.25 | 79.00 | 86.25 | Q |
| 7 | 9 | 16 | Li Fanghui | China | 84.75 | 19.25 | 84.75 | Q |
| 8 | 7 | 8 | Brita Sigourney | United States | 80.50 | 84.50 | 84.50 | Q |
| 9 | 5 | 1 | Hanna Faulhaber | United States | 84.25 | 82.00 | 84.25 | Q |
| 10 | 12 | 17 | Carly Margulies | United States | 79.00 | 82.25 | 82.25 | Q |
| 11 | 15 | 13 | Amy Fraser | Canada | 75.25 | 75.75 | 75.75 | Q |
| 12 | 13 | 20 | Sabrina Cakmakli | Germany | 71.50 | 36.50 | 71.50 | Q |
| 13 | 10 | 18 | Devin Logan | United States | 71.00 | 62.00 | 71.00 | |
| 14 | 17 | 7 | Alexandra Glazkova | ROC | 67.00 | 69.25 | 69.25 | |
| 15 | 14 | 19 | Saori Suzuki | Japan | 68.75 | 66.25 | 68.75 | |
| 16 | 16 | 6 | Wu Meng | China | 12.50 | 67.75 | 67.75 | |
| 17 | 20 | 10 | Kim Da-eun | South Korea | 44.50 | 45.50 | 45.50 | |
| 18 | 18 | 14 | Chloe McMillan | New Zealand | 41.75 | 43.50 | 43.50 | |
| 19 | 21 | 12 | Anja Barugh | New Zealand | 38.50 | 12.25 | 38.50 | |
| 20 | 11 | 11 | Jang Yu-jin | South Korea | 3.75 | 4.25 | 4.25 | |

=== Final ===
| Rank | Bib | Order | Name | Country | Run 1 | Run 2 | Run 3 | Best |
|---|---|---|---|---|---|---|---|---|
| 1st place, gold medalist(s) | 1 | 12 | Eileen Gu | China | 93.25 | 95.25 | 30.00 | 95.25 |
| 2nd place, silver medalist(s) | 4 | 7 | Cassie Sharpe | Canada | 89.00 | 90.00 | 90.75 | 90.75 |
| 3rd place, bronze medalist(s) | 3 | 11 | Rachael Karker | Canada | 87.75 | 85.25 | 38.00 | 87.75 |
| 4 | 8 | 10 | Kelly Sildaru | Estonia | 80.25 | 87.00 | 85.00 | 87.00 |
| 5 | 9 | 6 | Li Fanghui | China | 81.75 | 86.50 | 16.75 | 86.50 |
| 6 | 5 | 4 | Hanna Faulhaber | United States | 85.25 | 84.50 | 19.00 | 85.25 |
| 7 | 6 | 8 | Zhang Kexin | China | 78.75 | 25.75 | 3.25 | 78.75 |
| 8 | 15 | 2 | Amy Fraser | Canada | 75.25 | 35.75 | 11.00 | 75.25 |
| 9 | 2 | 9 | Zoe Atkin | Great Britain | 18.75 | 10.75 | 73.25 | 73.25 |
| 10 | 7 | 5 | Brita Sigourney | United States | 70.75 | 60.00 | 12.25 | 70.75 |
| 11 | 12 | 3 | Carly Margulies | United States | 24.75 | 1.75 | 61.00 | 61.00 |
| 12 | 13 | 1 | Sabrina Cakmakli | Germany | 40.00 | 54.00 | 42.75 | 54.00 |
