= FIS Freestyle Ski and Snowboarding World Championships 2019 – Women's ski halfpipe =

Women's ski halfpipe at the FIS Freestyle Ski and Snowboarding World Championships 2019
- Venue: Park City Mountain Resort
- Location: Utah, United States
- Dates: February 7–9
- Competitors: 17 from 10 nations
- Winning points: 95.00

Medalists
gold medal	Kelly Sildaru	Estonia
silver medal	Cassie Sharpe	Canada
bronze medal	Brita Sigourney	United States

The Women's ski halfpipe competition at the FIS Freestyle Ski and Snowboarding World Championships 2019 was held on February 7 and 9, 2019.

== Qualification ==
The qualification was started on February 7, at 11:15. The best eight skiers qualified for the final.

Rank	Bib	Start order	Name	Country	Run 1	Run 2	Best	Notes
1	2	10	Cassie Sharpe	Canada	90.60	93.20	93.20	Q
2	5	3	Kelly Sildaru	Estonia	92.00	87.60	92.00	Q
3	4	1	Brita Sigourney	United States	86.80	90.20	90.20	Q
4	3	7	Rachael Karker	Canada	89.60	25.00	89.60	Q
5	1	4	Zhang Kexin	China	22.60	80.40	80.40	Q
6	6	6	Li Fanghui	China	79.60	61.60	79.60	Q
7	9	2	Maddie Bowman	United States	77.00	59.60	77.00	Q
8	15	15	Elisabeth Gram	Austria	73.60	69.60	73.60	Q
9	14	17	Sabrina Cakmakli	Germany	70.80	72.80	72.80	
10	11	14	Wu Meng	China	69.40	10.40	69.40	
11	10	5	Jang Yu-jin	South Korea	67.20	66.40	67.20	
12	8	9	Yurie Watabe	Japan	63.80	25.20	63.80	
13	16	16	Zoe Atkin	Great Britain	42.20	62.40	62.40	
14	12	11	Annalisa Drew	United States	4.00	57.60	57.60	
15	17	13	Anaïs Caradeux	France	48.60	30.00	48.60	
16	13	12	Zhang Ziyi	China	5.60	20.40	20.40	
17	7	8	Abigale Hansen	United States	12.80	DNS	12.80	

== Final ==
The final was started on February 9, at 19:00.

Rank	Bib	Name	Country	Run 1	Run 2	Run 3	Best	Notes
1st place, gold medalist(s)	7	Kelly Sildaru	Estonia	51.80	88.00	95.00	95.00	
2nd place, silver medalist(s)	8	Cassie Sharpe	Canada	94.40	91.40	32.00	94.40	
3rd place, bronze medalist(s)	6	Brita Sigourney	United States	90.60	49.20	89.80	90.60	
4	3	Rachael Karker	Canada	85.20	79.20	54.20	85.20	
5	5	Li Fanghui	China	5.00	75.40	80.20	80.20	
6	2	Maddie Bowman	United States	50.60	77.00	75.60	77.00	
7	1	Elisabeth Gram	Austria	68.60	69.20	74.80	74.80	
8	4	Zhang Kexin	China	19.20	73.60	48.60	73.60	
