= Svea Irving =

American freestyle skier (born 2002)

Personal information
- Born: February 27, 2002 (age 24) Winter Park, Colorado, U.S.

Sport
- Sport: Freestyle skiing
- Event: Halfpipe
Medal record
Women's freestyle skiing
Representing the United States
World Junior Championships
Silver medal – second place	2017 Crans Montana	Halfpipe
Winter X Games
Bronze medal – third place	2023 Aspen	SuperPipe

Svea Irving (born February 27, 2002) is an American freestyle skier specializing in the halfpipe discipline. She represented the United States at the 2026 Winter Olympics.

== Career ==
Irving competed at the 2017 FIS Freestyle Junior World Ski Championships and won a silver medal in the halfpipe event with a score of 79.0. She competed at the 2023 Winter X Games and won a bronze medal in the superpipe event.

During the 2023–24 FIS Freestyle Ski World Cup, she earned her first career World Cup podium on February 17, 2024, finishing in third place. During the 2024–25 FIS Freestyle Ski World Cup, she finished every event in the top five, including her first podium of the season on December 7, 2024, finishing in third place.

She competed at the 2025 FIS Freestyle Ski World Championships and finished in fifth place in the halfpipe event with a score of 83.25.

In January 2026, she was selected to represent the United States at the 2026 Winter Olympics.

== Personal life ==
Her older brother, Birk, is also an Olympic freeski halfpipe skier. Her grandfather, John Irving, is a novelist.

== Results ==
=== Olympic Winter Games ===
Year	Age	Halfpipe
(Italy) 2026 Milano Cortina	24	11

=== World Championships ===
Year	Age	Halfpipe
(United States) 2021 Aspen	19	10
(Georgia (country)) 2023 Bakuriani	21	6
(Switzerland) 2025 Engadin	23	5

=== World Cup ===
==== Season standings ====
Season	Age	Overall	Halfpipe
2018	16	122	25
2019	17	72	11
2020	18	97	17
2021	19	44	11
2022	20	30	13
2023	21	16	7
2024	22	17	5
2025	23	14	4
