= 2024–25 FIS Freestyle Ski World Cup =

Freestyle skiing competitive season

Discipline	Men	Women
Ski Cross	(Canada) Reece Howden (3)	(Switzerland) Fanny Smith (4)
Overall Moguls	(Canada) Mikaël Kingsbury (13)	(United States) Jaelin Kauf (1)
Moguls	(Canada) Mikaël Kingsbury (3)	(United States) Jaelin Kauf (1)
Dual Moguls	(Canada) Mikaël Kingsbury (4)	(United States) Jaelin Kauf (1)
Park & Pipe Overall	(Austria) Matěj Švancer (1)	(Italy) Flora Tabanelli (1)
Halfpipe	(United States) Alex Ferreira (3)	(China) Li Fanghui (1) (United Kingdom) Zoe Atkin (1)
Slopestyle	(United States) Alex Hall (1)	(France) Tess Ledeux (2)
Big Air	(New Zealand) Luca Harrington (1)	(Italy) Flora Tabanelli (1)
Aerials	(China) Qi Guangpu (4)	(Australia) Laura Peel (3)
- Nations Cup Overall: Canada (16)

Competition
Locations	34	34
Individual	49	49
Team	1	1
Cancelled	5	5

The 2024–25 FIS Freestyle Ski World Cup, organized by the International Ski Federation (FIS), was a World Cup in freestyle skiing for men and women.

The season started on 9 September 2024 in Cardrona, New Zealand and concluded on 30 March 2025 in Idre Fjäll, Sweden.

This season included six disciplines: moguls, aerials, ski cross, halfpipe, slopestyle and big air.

== Map of World Cup hosts ==
Europe	Switzerland
Europe	Austria & Italy
Europe	New Zealand
Asia	North America

== Men ==
=== Calendar ===
==== Ski Cross (SX) ====
No.	Date	Place	Winner	Second	Third	Discipline leader	R.
1	12 December 2024	(France) Val Thorens	(Italy) Simone Deromedis	(Germany) Florian Wilmsmann	(Canada) Kevin Drury	(Italy) Simone Deromedis	
2	13 December 2024	(France) Val Thorens	(Switzerland) Alex Fiva (Austria) Adam Kappacher	N/A	(Canada) Kevin Drury	(Germany) Florian Wilmsmann	
3	17 December 2024	(Switzerland) Arosa	(Canada) Reece Howden	(Italy) Simone Deromedis	(Sweden) David Mobärg	(Italy) Simone Deromedis	
4	20 December 2024	(Italy) Innichen	(Germany) Florian Wilmsmann	(France) Youri Duplessis Kergomard	(Austria) Johannes Aujesky	(Germany) Florian Wilmsmann	
5	21 December 2024	(Italy) Innichen	(Canada) Reece Howden	(Switzerland) Alex Fiva	(Italy) Simone Deromedis	(Germany) Florian Wilmsmann	
6	16 January 2025	(Austria) Reiteralm	(Germany) Florian Wilmsmann	(France) Melvin Tchiknavorian	(Italy) Yanick Gunsch	(Germany) Florian Wilmsmann	
7	17 January 2025	(Austria) Reiteralm	(France) Youri Duplessis Kergomard	(Italy) Simone Deromedis	(Canada) Kevin Drury	(Germany) Florian Wilmsmann	
	23 January 2025	(Italy) Alleghe	Cancelled				
	24 January 2025	(Italy) Alleghe	Cancelled				
8	1 February 2025	(Switzerland) Veysonnaz	(Italy) Simone Deromedis	(France) Youri Duplessis Kergomard	(Canada) Reece Howden	(Germany) Florian Wilmsmann	
9	2 February 2025	(Switzerland) Veysonnaz	(France) Youri Duplessis Kergomard	(Sweden) David Mobärg	(Canada) Jared Schmidt	(Italy) Simone Deromedis	
10	8 February 2025	(Italy) Val di Fassa	(Switzerland) Ryan Regez	(Switzerland) Alex Fiva	(Germany) Florian Wilmsmann	(Germany) Florian Wilmsmann	
11	9 February 2025	(Italy) Val di Fassa	(Canada) Reece Howden	(Italy) Simone Deromedis	(Switzerland) Ryan Regez	(Italy) Simone Deromedis	
12	28 February 2025	(Georgia (country)) Gudauri	(Italy) Simone Deromedis	(Japan) Ryō Sugai	(Sweden) Erik Mobärg	(Italy) Simone Deromedis	
13	1 March 2025	(Georgia (country)) Gudauri	(Canada) Reece Howden	(Germany) Florian Wilmsmann	(Italy) Simone Deromedis	(Italy) Simone Deromedis	
14	14 March 2025	(Canada) Craigleith	(Canada) Reece Howden	(Switzerland) Alex Fiva	(Canada) Kevin Drury	(Italy) Simone Deromedis	
15	15 March 2025	(Canada) Craigleith	(Germany) Florian Wilmsmann	(Canada) Reece Howden	(Canada) Kevin Drury	(Germany) Florian Wilmsmann	
16	29 March 2025	(Sweden) Idre Fjäll	(Canada) Reece Howden	(Italy) Simone Deromedis	(Sweden) Erik Mobärg	(Canada) Reece Howden	
17	30 March 2025	(Sweden) Idre Fjäll	(Canada) Reece Howden	(France) Youri Duplessis Kergomard	(Italy) Simone Deromedis	(Canada) Reece Howden	

==== Moguls (MO) ====
No.	Date	Place	Winner	Second	Third	Discipline leader	R.
1	30 November 2024	(Finland) Ruka	(Canada) Mikaël Kingsbury	(Sweden) Walter Wallberg	(Japan) Ikuma Horishima	(Canada) Mikaël Kingsbury	
2	6 December 2024	(Sweden) Idre Fjäll	(Canada) Mikaël Kingsbury	(Japan) Ikuma Horishima	(Sweden) Walter Wallberg	(Canada) Mikaël Kingsbury	
	13 December 2024	(France) Alpe d'Huez	Cancelled				
3	20 December 2024	(Georgia (country)) Bakuriani	(France) Benjamin Cavet	(Canada) Mikaël Kingsbury	(Finland) Severi Vierelä	(Canada) Mikaël Kingsbury	
4	24 January 2025	(United States) Waterville	(Canada) Mikaël Kingsbury	(United States) Nick Page	(France) Benjamin Cavet	(Canada) Mikaël Kingsbury	
5	31 January 2025	(Canada) Val St. Come	(Canada) Mikaël Kingsbury	(Canada) Julien Viel	(Finland) Olli Penttala	(Canada) Mikaël Kingsbury	
6	6 February 2025	(United States) Deer Valley	(Japan) Ikuma Horishima	(Kazakhstan) Pavel Kolmakov	(France) Benjamin Cavet	(Canada) Mikaël Kingsbury	
7	21 February 2025	(China) Beidahu	(Japan) Ikuma Horishima	(Canada) Mikaël Kingsbury	(Sweden) Filip Gravenfors	(Canada) Mikaël Kingsbury	
8	28 February 2025	(Kazakhstan) Almaty	(Canada) Mikaël Kingsbury	(South Korea) Jung Dae-yoon	(Japan) Ikuma Horishima	(Canada) Mikaël Kingsbury	
9	11 March 2025	(Italy) Livigno	(Japan) Ikuma Horishima	(Canada) Mikaël Kingsbury	(United States) Charlie Mickel	(Canada) Mikaël Kingsbury	

==== Dual Moguls (DM) ====
No.	Date	Place	Winner	Second	Third	Discipline leader	R.
	7 December 2024	(Sweden) Idre Fjäll	Cancelled				
	14 December 2024	(France) Alpe d'Huez	Cancelled				
1	21 December 2024	(Georgia (country)) Bakuriani	(Sweden) Walter Wallberg	(France) Benjamin Cavet	(Sweden) Filip Gravenfors	(Sweden) Walter Wallberg	
2	25 January 2025	(United States) Waterville	(Canada) Mikaël Kingsbury	(Australia) Matt Graham	(Sweden) Filip Gravenfors	(Canada) Mikaël Kingsbury	
3	1 February 2025	(Canada) Val St. Come	(Canada) Mikaël Kingsbury	(France) Benjamin Cavet	(United States) Nick Page	(Canada) Mikaël Kingsbury	
4	8 February 2025	(United States) Deer Valley	(Japan) Ikuma Horishima	(Canada) Mikaël Kingsbury	(Kazakhstan) Pavel Kolmakov	(Canada) Mikaël Kingsbury	
5	22 February 2025	(China) Beidahu	(Finland) Severi Vierelä	(Japan) Ikuma Horishima	(Canada) Julien Viel	(Canada) Mikaël Kingsbury	
6	1 March 2025	(Kazakhstan) Almaty	(Canada) Mikaël Kingsbury	(Japan) Ikuma Horishima	(Australia) Matt Graham	(Canada) Mikaël Kingsbury	
7	12 March 2025	(Italy) Livigno	(Canada) Mikaël Kingsbury	(Japan) Ikuma Horishima	(Sweden) Filip Gravenfors	(Canada) Mikaël Kingsbury	

==== Aerials (AE) ====
No.	Date	Place	Winner	Second	Third	Discipline leader	R.
1	18 January 2025	(United States) Lake Placid	(China) Sun Jiaxu	(Switzerland) Noé Roth	(China) Li Xinpeng	(China) Sun Jiaxu	
2	25 January 2025	(Canada) Lac-Beauport	(China) Qi Guangpu	(Canada) Lewis Irving	(United States) Christopher Lillis	(China) Qi Guangpu	
3	26 January 2025	(Canada) Lac-Beauport	(China) Qi Guangpu	(China) Wang Xindi	(Canada) Emile Nadeau	(China) Qi Guangpu	
4	7 February 2025	(United States) Deer Valley	(United States) Quinn Dehlinger	(Ukraine) Dmytro Kotovskyi	(United States) Christopher Lillis	(China) Qi Guangpu	
5	23 February 2025	(China) Beidahu	(China) Li Tianma	(China) Qi Guangpu	(United States) Christopher Lillis	(China) Qi Guangpu	
6	2 March 2025	(Kazakhstan) Almaty	(China) Wang Xindi	(Switzerland) Noé Roth	(China) Qi Guangpu	(China) Qi Guangpu	
7	13 March 2025	(Italy) Livigno	(Switzerland) Noé Roth	(China) Sun Jiaxu	(Switzerland) Pirmin Werner	(China) Qi Guangpu	

==== Halfpipe (HP) ====
No.	Date	Place	Winner	Second	Third	Discipline leader	R.
1	9 September 2024	(New Zealand) Cardrona	(Canada) Brendan Mackay	(United States) Alex Ferreira	(Canada) Andrew Longino	(Canada) Brendan Mackay	
2	7 December 2024	(China) Secret Garden	(United States) Nick Goepper	(United States) Alex Ferreira	(United States) David Wise	(United States) Alex Ferreira	
3	21 December 2024	(United States) Copper	(United States) Alex Ferreira	(Canada) Brendan Mackay	(United States) Nick Goepper	(United States) Alex Ferreira	
4	2 February 2025	(United States) Aspen	(United States) Alex Ferreira	(United States) Nick Goepper	(United States) Matthew Labaugh	(United States) Alex Ferreira	
5	15 February 2025	(Canada) Calgary	(New Zealand) Finley Melville Ives	(United States) Nick Goepper	(United States) Alex Ferreira	(United States) Alex Ferreira	

==== Slopestyle (SS) ====
No.	Date	Place	Winner	Second	Third	Discipline leader	R.
1	23 November 2024	(Austria) Stubai (Note: Results from qualification)	(United States) Colby Stevenson	(Switzerland) Andri Ragettli	(Norway) Tormod Frostad	(United States) Colby Stevenson	
2	17 January 2025	(Switzerland) Laax	(Norway) Birk Ruud	(United States) Mac Forehand	(United States) Alex Hall	(Norway) Birk Ruud	
3	1 February 2025	(United States) Aspen	(United States) Alex Hall	(United States) Colby Stevenson	(Norway) Birk Ruud	(United States) Colby Stevenson	
4	22 February 2025	(Canada) Stoneham	(Austria) Matěj Švancer	(New Zealand) Luca Harrington	(New Zealand) Ben Barclay	(United States) Colby Stevenson	
5	14 March 2025	(France) Tignes	(United States) Alex Hall	(Switzerland) Andri Ragettli	(Norway) Sebastian Schjerve	(United States) Alex Hall	

==== Big Air (BA) ====
No.	Date	Place	Winner	Second	Third	Discipline leader	R.
1	18 October 2024	(Switzerland) Chur	(Austria) Matěj Švancer	(Norway) Tormod Frostad	(Canada) Dylan Deschamps	(Austria) Matěj Švancer	
2	1 December 2024	(China) Beijing	(Norway) Tormod Frostad	(Italy) Miro Tabanelli	(Canada) Dylan Deschamps	(Norway) Tormod Frostad	
3	4 January 2025	(Austria) Klagenfurt	(New Zealand) Luca Harrington	(France) Timothe Sivignon	(Austria) Matěj Švancer	(Norway) Tormod Frostad	
4	10 January 2025	(Austria) Kreischberg	(New Zealand) Luca Harrington	(Austria) Matěj Švancer	(Norway) Leo Landrø	(New Zealand) Luca Harrington	
5	6 February 2025	(United States) Aspen	(Austria) Matěj Švancer	(New Zealand) Luca Harrington	(United States) Konnor Ralph	(Austria) Matěj Švancer	
6	13 March 2025	(France) Tignes	(Italy) Miro Tabanelli	(United States) Mac Forehand	(New Zealand) Luca Harrington	(New Zealand) Luca Harrington	

=== Standings ===
==== Ski Cross ====
Rank	after all 17 events	Points
	(Canada) Reece Howden	1038
2	(Italy) Simone Deromedis	965
3	(Germany) Florian Wilmsmann	902
4	(France) Youri Duplessis Kergomard	715
5	(Switzerland) Alex Fiva	638

==== Overall Moguls (MO/DM) ====
Rank	after all 16 events	Points
	(Canada) Mikaël Kingsbury	1299
2	(Japan) Ikuma Horishima	1038
3	(Sweden) Filip Gravenfors	647
4	(Australia) Matt Graham	605
5	(United States) Nick Page	587

==== Moguls ====
Rank	after all 9 events	Points
	(Canada) Mikaël Kingsbury	755
2	(Japan) Ikuma Horishima	598
3	(United States) Nick Page	344
4	(France) Benjamin Cavet	339
5	(Australia) Matt Graham	305

==== Dual Moguls ====
Rank	after all 7 events	Points
	(Canada) Mikaël Kingsbury	544
2	(Japan) Ikuma Horishima	440
3	(Sweden) Filip Gravenfors	365
4	(Australia) Matt Graham	300
5	(United States) Nick Page	243

==== Aerials ====
Rank	after all 7 events	Points
	(China) Qi Guangpu	400
2	(Switzerland) Noé Roth	400
3	(China) Wang Xindi	304
4	(China) Sun Jiaxu	298
5	(United States) Christopher Lillis	274

==== Park & Pipe Overall (HP/SS/BA) ====
Rank	after all 16 events	Points
	(Austria) Matěj Švancer	472
2	(New Zealand) Luca Harrington	470
3	(United States) Alex Ferreira	420
4	(Switzerland) Andri Ragettli	355
5	(Norway) Tormod Frostad	330

==== Halfpipe ====
Rank	after all 5 events	Points
	(United States) Alex Ferreira	360
2	(United States) Nick Goepper	320
3	(Canada) Brendan Mackay	275
4	(New Zealand) Finley Melville Ives	226
5	(United States) Hunter Hess	180

==== Slopestyle ====
Rank	after all 5 events	Points
	(United States) Alex Hall	282
2	(Switzerland) Andri Ragettli	250
3	(United States) Colby Stevenson	229
4	(Norway) Birk Ruud	216
5	(United States) Mac Forehand	204

==== Big Air ====
Rank	after all 6 events	Points
	(New Zealand) Luca Harrington	390
2	(Austria) Matěj Švancer	351
3	(Italy) Miro Tabanelli	270
4	(Norway) Tormod Frostad	234
5	(Switzerland) Andri Ragettli	190

== Women ==
=== Calendar ===
==== Ski Cross (SX) ====
No.	Date	Place	Winner	Second	Third	Discipline leader	R.
1	12 December 2024	(France) Val Thorens	(Canada) Marielle Thompson	(Switzerland) Fanny Smith	(Germany) Daniela Maier	(Canada) Marielle Thompson	
2	13 December 2024	(France) Val Thorens	(Canada) India Sherret	(Germany) Daniela Maier	(Canada) Marielle Thompson	(Canada) Marielle Thompson	
3	17 December 2024	(Switzerland) Arosa	(Canada) Marielle Thompson	(Canada) India Sherret	(Canada) Hannah Schmidt	(Canada) Marielle Thompson	
4	20 December 2024	(Italy) Innichen	(Germany) Daniela Maier	(Switzerland) Talina Gantenbein	(France) Marielle Berger Sabbatel	(Canada) Marielle Thompson	
5	21 December 2024	(Italy) Innichen	(Germany) Daniela Maier	(Italy) Jole Galli	(France) Marielle Berger Sabbatel	(Germany) Daniela Maier	
6	16 January 2025	(Austria) Reiteralm	(Canada) Hannah Schmidt	(Switzerland) Fanny Smith	(Canada) India Sherret	(Germany) Daniela Maier	
7	17 January 2025	(Austria) Reiteralm	(Canada) India Sherret	(Switzerland) Fanny Smith	(Canada) Hannah Schmidt	(Canada) India Sherret	
	23 January 2025	(Italy) Alleghe	Cancelled				
	24 January 2025	(Italy) Alleghe	Cancelled				
8	1 February 2025	(Switzerland) Veysonnaz	(Canada) Marielle Thompson	(Germany) Daniela Maier	(Canada) India Sherret	(Canada) India Sherret	
9	2 February 2025	(Switzerland) Veysonnaz	(Canada) Marielle Thompson	(Germany) Daniela Maier	(Switzerland) Fanny Smith	(Canada) India Sherret	
10	8 February 2025	(Italy) Val di Fassa	(Canada) Marielle Thompson	(France) Marielle Berger Sabbatel	(Canada) Courtney Hoffos	(Canada) Marielle Thompson	
11	9 February 2025	(Italy) Val di Fassa	(Italy) Jole Galli	(France) Marielle Berger Sabbatel	(Switzerland) Fanny Smith	(Canada) Marielle Thompson	
12	28 February 2025	(Georgia (country)) Gudauri	(Switzerland) Fanny Smith	(Italy) Jole Galli	(Canada) India Sherret	(Canada) India Sherret	
13	1 March 2025	(Georgia (country)) Gudauri	(Italy) Jole Galli	(Switzerland) Fanny Smith	(Canada) Courtney Hoffos	(Canada) India Sherret	
14	14 March 2025	(Canada) Craigleith	(Switzerland) Fanny Smith	(France) Marielle Berger Sabbatel	(Italy) Jole Galli	(Canada) India Sherret	
15	15 March 2025	(Canada) Craigleith	(Switzerland) Fanny Smith	(Canada) Courtney Hoffos	(Canada) Abby McEwen	(Switzerland) Fanny Smith	
16	29 March 2025	(Sweden) Idre Fjäll	(Germany) Daniela Maier	(Canada) Courtney Hoffos	(Switzerland) Fanny Smith	(Switzerland) Fanny Smith	
17	30 March 2025	(Sweden) Idre Fjäll	(Switzerland) Fanny Smith	(Canada) Courtney Hoffos	(Switzerland) Talina Gantenbein	(Switzerland) Fanny Smith	

==== Moguls (MO) ====
No.	Date	Place	Winner	Second	Third	Discipline leader	R.
1	30 November 2024	(Finland) Ruka	(France) Perrine Laffont	(Australia) Jakara Anthony	(United States) Olivia Giaccio	(France) Perrine Laffont	
2	6 December 2024	(Sweden) Idre Fjäll	(Australia) Jakara Anthony	(France) Perrine Laffont	(Canada) Maïa Schwinghammer	(Australia) Jakara Anthony (France) Perrine Laffont	
	13 December 2024	(France) Alpe d'Huez	Cancelled				
3	20 December 2024	(Georgia (country)) Bakuriani	(United States) Olivia Giaccio	(France) Perrine Laffont	(United States) Jaelin Kauf	(France) Perrine Laffont	
4	24 January 2025	(United States) Waterville	(France) Perrine Laffont	(United States) Jaelin Kauf	(United States) Olivia Giaccio	(France) Perrine Laffont	
5	31 January 2025	(Canada) Val St. Come	(Canada) Maïa Schwinghammer	(United States) Jaelin Kauf	(United States) Olivia Giaccio	(France) Perrine Laffont	
6	6 February 2025	(United States) Deer Valley	(United States) Jaelin Kauf	(France) Perrine Laffont	(Canada) Maïa Schwinghammer	(France) Perrine Laffont	
7	21 February 2025	(China) Beidahu	(United States) Jaelin Kauf	(France) Perrine Laffont	(United States) Olivia Giaccio	(France) Perrine Laffont	
8	28 February 2025	(Kazakhstan) Almaty	(United States) Tess Johnson	(United States) Jaelin Kauf	(Japan) Rino Yanagimoto	(United States) Jaelin Kauf	
9	11 March 2025	(Italy) Livigno	(United States) Jaelin Kauf	(France) Perrine Laffont	(United States) Tess Johnson	(United States) Jaelin Kauf	

==== Dual Moguls (DM) ====
No.	Date	Place	Winner	Second	Third	Discipline leader	R.
	7 December 2024	(Sweden) Idre Fjäll	Cancelled				
	14 December 2024	(France) Alpe d'Huez	Cancelled				
1	21 December 2024	(Georgia (country)) Bakuriani	(United States) Jaelin Kauf	(Japan) Rino Yanagimoto	(France) Perrine Laffont	(United States) Jaelin Kauf	
2	25 January 2025	(United States) Waterville	(France) Perrine Laffont	(United States) Jaelin Kauf	(Kazakhstan) Yuliya Galysheva	(United States) Jaelin Kauf	
3	1 February 2025	(Canada) Val St. Come	(United States) Jaelin Kauf	(Kazakhstan) Anastassiya Gorodko	(France) Perrine Laffont	(United States) Jaelin Kauf	
4	8 February 2025	(United States) Deer Valley	(United States) Jaelin Kauf	(France) Perrine Laffont	(United States) Olivia Giaccio	(United States) Jaelin Kauf	
5	22 February 2025	(China) Beidahu	(United States) Jaelin Kauf	(France) Perrine Laffont	(United States) Tess Johnson	(United States) Jaelin Kauf	
6	1 March 2025	(Kazakhstan) Almaty	(United States) Jaelin Kauf	(Japan) Rino Yanagimoto	(Kazakhstan) Anastassiya Gorodko	(United States) Jaelin Kauf	
7	12 March 2025	(Italy) Livigno	(Australia) Charlotte Wilson	(United States) Jaelin Kauf	(France) Perrine Laffont	(United States) Jaelin Kauf	

==== Aerials (AE) ====
No.	Date	Place	Winner	Second	Third	Discipline leader	R.
1	18 January 2025	(United States) Lake Placid	(China) Xu Mengtao	(Australia) Danielle Scott	(Canada) Marion Thenault	(China) Xu Mengtao	
2	25 January 2025	(Canada) Lac-Beauport	(Australia) Laura Peel	(China) Xu Mengtao	(China) Chen Meiting	(China) Xu Mengtao	
3	26 January 2025	(Canada) Lac-Beauport	(Australia) Laura Peel	(United States) Karenna Elliott	(Australia) Airleigh Frigo	(Australia) Laura Peel	
4	7 February 2025	(United States) Deer Valley	(Australia) Laura Peel	(Australia) Danielle Scott	(Australia) Abbey Willcox	(Australia) Laura Peel	
5	23 February 2025	(China) Beidahu	(China) Xu Mengtao	(China) Chen Meiting	(Australia) Danielle Scott	(Australia) Laura Peel	
6	2 March 2025	(Kazakhstan) Almaty	(Australia) Laura Peel	(China) Xu Mengtao	(Australia) Danielle Scott	(Australia) Laura Peel	
7	13 March 2025	(Italy) Livigno	(Australia) Laura Peel	(China) Xu Mengtao	(China) Chen Meiting	(Australia) Laura Peel	

==== Halfpipe (HP) ====
No.	Date	Place	Winner	Second	Third	Discipline leader	R.
1	9 September 2024	(New Zealand) Cardrona	(China) Eileen Gu	(China) Zhang Kexin	(Canada) Rachael Karker	(China) Eileen Gu	
2	7 December 2024	(China) Secret Garden	(China) Eileen Gu	(China) Li Fanghui	(United States) Svea Irving	(China) Eileen Gu	
3	21 December 2024	(United States) Copper	(China) Eileen Gu	(United Kingdom) Zoe Atkin	(Canada) Cassie Sharpe	(China) Eileen Gu	
4	2 February 2025	(United States) Aspen	(United Kingdom) Zoe Atkin	(China) Li Fanghui	(Canada) Amy Fraser	(China) Eileen Gu	
5	15 February 2025	(Canada) Calgary	(China) Li Fanghui	(United Kingdom) Zoe Atkin	(Canada) Rachael Karker	(China) Li Fanghui (United Kingdom) Zoe Atkin	

==== Slopestyle (SS) ====
No.	Date	Place	Winner	Second	Third	Discipline leader	R.
1	23 November 2024	(Austria) Stubai	(France) Tess Ledeux	(Switzerland) Mathilde Gremaud	(Switzerland) Sarah Höfflin	(France) Tess Ledeux	
2	17 January 2025	(Switzerland) Laax	(China) Eileen Gu	(Canada) Megan Oldham	(Switzerland) Mathilde Gremaud	(Switzerland) Mathilde Gremaud	
3	1 February 2025	(United States) Aspen	(France) Tess Ledeux	(Canada) Megan Oldham	(United States) Rell Harwood	(France) Tess Ledeux	
4	22 February 2025	(Canada) Stoneham	(Italy) Flora Tabanelli	(China) Yang Ruyi	(United States) Rell Harwood	(Canada) Megan Oldham	
5	14 March 2025	(France) Tignes	(United Kingdom) Kirsty Muir	(Australia) Abi Harrigan	(Australia) Ruby Star Andrews	(France) Tess Ledeux	

==== Big Air (BA) ====
No.	Date	Place	Winner	Second	Third	Discipline leader	R.
1	18 October 2024	(Switzerland) Chur	(Switzerland) Mathilde Gremaud	(Italy) Flora Tabanelli	(Germany) Muriel Mohr	(Switzerland) Mathilde Gremaud	
2	1 December 2024	(China) Beijing	(France) Tess Ledeux	(Switzerland) Sarah Höfflin	(Italy) Flora Tabanelli	(Switzerland) Mathilde Gremaud	
3	4 January 2025	(Austria) Klagenfurt	(China) Liu Mengting	(Italy) Flora Tabanelli	(Germany) Muriel Mohr	(Italy) Flora Tabanelli	
4	10 January 2025	(Austria) Kreischberg	(Italy) Flora Tabanelli	(Finland) Anni Kärävä	(Austria) Lara Wolf	(Italy) Flora Tabanelli	
5	6 February 2025	(United States) Aspen	(Canada) Megan Oldham	(Italy) Flora Tabanelli	(Finland) Anni Kärävä	(Italy) Flora Tabanelli	
6	13 March 2025	(France) Tignes	(Italy) Flora Tabanelli	(France) Tess Ledeux	(Finland) Anni Kärävä	(Italy) Flora Tabanelli	

=== Standings ===
==== Ski Cross ====
Rank	after all 17 events	Points
	(Switzerland) Fanny Smith	1076
2	(Germany) Daniela Maier	915
3	(Canada) India Sherret	869
4	(Italy) Jole Galli	847
5	(France) Marielle Berger Sabbatel	844

==== Overall Moguls (MO/DM) ====
Rank	after all 16 events	Points
	(United States) Jaelin Kauf	1336
2	(France) Perrine Laffont	1090
3	(United States) Tess Johnson	683
4	(Canada) Maïa Schwinghammer	681
5	(Japan) Rino Yanagimoto	608

==== Moguls ====
Rank	after all 9 events	Points
	(United States) Jaelin Kauf	676
2	(France) Perrine Laffont	650
3	(Canada) Maïa Schwinghammer	456
4	(United States) Tess Johnson	430
5	(United States) Olivia Giaccio	401

==== Dual Moguls ====
Rank	after all 7 events	Points
	(United States) Jaelin Kauf	660
2	(France) Perrine Laffont	440
3	(Japan) Rino Yanagimoto	385
4	(Kazakhstan) Anastassiya Gorodko	299
5	(United States) Tess Johnson	253

==== Aerials ====
Rank	after all 7 events	Points
	(Australia) Laura Peel	542
2	(China) Xu Mengtao	444
3	(Australia) Danielle Scott	368
4	(China) Chen Meiting	267
5	(Australia) Abbey Willcox	259

==== Park & Pipe Overall (HP/SS/BA) ====
Rank	after all 16 events	Points
	(Italy) Flora Tabanelli	540
2	(France) Tess Ledeux	470
3	(China) Eileen Gu	400
4	(Switzerland) Mathilde Gremaud	342
5	(United Kingdom) Zoe Atkin	341

==== Halfpipe ====
Rank	after all 5 events	Points
	(United Kingdom) Zoe Atkin	305
	(China) Li Fanghui	305
3	(China) Eileen Gu	300
4	(United States) Svea Irving	210
5	(Canada) Cassie Sharpe	205

==== Slopestyle ====
Rank	after all 5 events	Points
	(France) Tess Ledeux	218
2	(Canada) Megan Oldham	213
3	(Italy) Flora Tabanelli	192
4	(United States) Rell Harwood	175
5	(United Kingdom) Kirsty Muir	172

==== Big Air ====
Rank	after all 6 events	Points
	(Italy) Flora Tabanelli	440
2	(France) Tess Ledeux	270
3	(Finland) Anni Kärävä	267
4	(China) Liu Mengting	256
5	(Germany) Muriel Mohr	241

== Team ==
=== Team Aerials (AET) ===
No.	Date	Place	Winner	Second	Third	R.
1	19 January 2025	(United States) Lake Placid	China Xu Mengtao; Li Xinpeng; Sun Jiaxu	Canada 2 Alexandra Montminy; Miha Fontaine; Alexandre Duchaine	Australia Abbey Willcox; Laura Peel; Reilly Flanagan	
2	24 February 2025	(China) Beidahu	China 1 Xu Mengtao; Li Tianma; Qi Guangpu	United States Karenna Elliott; Quinn Dehlinger; Christopher Lillis	China 2 Chen Meiting; Li Xinpeng; Wang Xindi	

== Nations Cup ==
=== Overall ===
Rank	after 43 of 100 events	Points
1	Canada	3609
2	France	2469
3	Switzerland	2440
4	United States	2370
5	Germany	1720
6	China	1515
7	Italy	1444
8	Japan	1237
9	Sweden	1124
10	Austria	991

=== Ski Cross ===
Rank	after 24 of 34 events	Points
1	Canada	4118
2	Switzerland	2840
3	France	2823
4	Germany	2392
5	Italy	1814
6	Austria	1067
7	Sweden	950
8	Japan	669
9	United States	233
10	Chile	91

=== Moguls ===
Rank	after 16 of 18 events	Points
	United States	2,786
2	Canada	1,971
3	Japan	1,719
4	France	1,450
5	Sweden	940
6	Australia	827
7	Kazakhstan	690
8	Finland	418
9	South Korea	237
10	United Kingdom	123

=== Dual Moguls ===
Rank	after 2 of 14 events	Points
1	Japan	260
2	Sweden	258
3	United States	229
4	France	165
5	Canada	160
6	Kazakhstan	115
7	Finland	62
8	Australia	40
9	Germany	37
10	South Korea	30

=== Park & Pipe (HP/SS/BA) ===
Rank	after 18 of 32 events	Points
1	United States	2400
2	China	1578
3	Switzerland	1474
4	Canada	1388
5	Norway	939
6	New Zealand	680
7	France	576
8	Italy	563
9	Austria	485
10	Finland	477

== Podium table by nation ==
Table showing the World Cup podium places (gold–1st place, silver–2nd place, bronze–3rd place) by the countries represented by the athletes.

Rank	Nation	Gold	Silver	Bronze	Total
1	Canada	25	12	27	64
2	United States	17	15	22	54
3	China	15	11	5	31
4	France	9	17	7	33
5	Italy	9	9	5	23
6	Switzerland	7	14	6	27
7	Australia	7	5	7	19
8	Japan	4	7	3	14
9	Germany	4	5	4	13
10	Austria	4	1	3	8
11	New Zealand	3	2	2	7
12	Great Britain	2	2	0	4
13	Norway	2	1	4	7
14	Sweden	1	2	7	10
15	Finland	1	1	4	6
16	Kazakhstan	0	2	3	5
17	South Korea	0	1	0	1
17	Ukraine	0	1	0	1
Totals (18 entries)		110	108	109	327

== Achievements ==
First World Cup career victory

Men

- (Norway) Tormod Frostad (22) – Big Air in Beijing
- (Austria) Adam Kappacher (31) – 2nd Ski Cross in Val Thorens
- (New Zealand) Luca Harrington (20) – Big Air in Klagenfurt

Women

- (China) Liu Mengting (20) – Big Air in Klagenfurt
- (Italy) Flora Tabanelli (17) – Big Air in Kreischberg

First World Cup career podium

Men

- (Canada) Andrew Longino (22) – Halfpipe in Cardrona
- (Finland) Severi Vierelä (23) – Moguls in Bakuriani
- (Italy) Yanick Gunsch (28) – 1st Ski Cross in Reiteralm

Women

- (Germany) Muriel Mohr (18) – Big Air in Chur
- (Finland) Anni Kärävä (24) – Big Air in Kreischberg
