= FIS Freestyle Ski and Snowboarding World Championships 2023 – Women's ski halfpipe =

Women's ski halfpipe at the FIS Freestyle Ski and Snowboarding World Championships 2023
- Location: Bakuriani, Georgia
- Dates: 1 March (qualification); 4 March
- Competitors: 13 from 6 nations
- Winning points: 95.75

Medalists
gold medal	Hanna Faulhaber	United States
silver medal	Zoe Atkin	Great Britain
bronze medal	Rachael Karker	Canada

The Women's ski halfpipe competition at the FIS Freestyle Ski and Snowboarding World Championships 2023 was held on 1 and 4 March 2023.

== Qualification ==
The qualification was started on 1 March at 11:15. The best eight skiers qualified for the final.

Rank	Bib	Start order	Name	Country	Run 1	Run 2	Best	Notes
1	1	8	Rachael Karker	Canada	90.50	88.25	90.50	Q
2	3	1	Hanna Faulhaber	United States	87.50	20.00	87.50	Q
3	7	10	Zoe Atkin	Great Britain	15.00	85.50	85.50	Q
4	2	5	Zhang Kexin	China	10.25	84.50	84.50	Q
5	6	2	Svea Irving	United States	75.25	81.25	83.00	Q
6	8	4	Dillan Glennie	Canada	75.50	75.25	75.50	Q
7	2	6	Amy Fraser	Canada	69.75	4.00	69.75	Q
8	5	7	Brita Sigourney	United States	66.25	67.00	67.00	Q
9	9	6	Riley Jacobs	United States	58.50	63.75	63.75	
10	10	9	Kim Dae-un	South Korea	52.25	57.50	57.50	
11	12	11	Sabrina Cakmakli	Germany	53.00	47.25	53.00	
12	11	13	Jang Yujin	China	50.25	52.75	52.75	
13	13	12	Liu Yishan	China	49.25	51.50	51.50	

== Final ==
The final was started on 4 March at 10:00.

Rank	Bib	Start order	Name	Country	Run 1	Run 2	Run 3	Best
1st place, gold medalist(s)	3	7	Hanna Faulhaber	United States	89.75	93.25	95.75	95.75
2nd place, silver medalist(s)	7	6	Zoe Atkin	Great Britain	12.50	94.50	89.00	94.50
3rd place, bronze medalist(s)	1	8	Rachael Karker	Canada	92.25	23.50	25.25	92.25
4	2	5	Zhang Kexin	China	79.25	83.25	89.00	89.00
5	4	2	Amy Fraser	Canada	86.00	75.25	21.50	86.00
6	6	4	Svea Irving	United States	81.75	72.75	84.00	84.00
7	5	1	Brita Sigourney	United States	74.25	72.75	75.75	75.75
8	8	3	Dillan Glennie	Canada	4.50	70.00	23.25	70.00
