= Zhang Kexin (skier) =

Chinese freestyle skier (born 2002)

Personal information
- Born: 5 June 2002 (age 24) Heilongjiang, China
- Height: 1.57 m (5 ft 2 in)

Sport
- Sport: Freestyle skiing
- Event: Halfpipe
Medal record
Women's freestyle skiing
Representing China
Asian Winter Games
Silver medal – second place	2025 Harbin	Halfpipe

Zhang Kexin
- Simplified Chinese: 张可欣
- Traditional Chinese: 張可欣
Transcriptions
Standard Mandarin
- Hanyu Pinyin: Zhāng Kěxīn
- IPA: [ʈʂáŋ kʰɤ̀ ɕín]

Zhang Kexin (Chinese: 张可欣; pinyin: Zhāng Kěxīn; Mandarin pronunciation: [ʈʂáŋ kʰɤ̀ ɕín]; born 5 June 2002) is a Chinese freestyle skier. She competed in the women's halfpipe in the 2018 and 2022 Winter Olympics, placing ninth and seventh, respectively.

== Career ==
=== World Cup results ===
All results are sourced from the International Ski Federation.

Representing	Season	Date	Location	Discipline	Place
China	2018	December 8, 2017	Copper Mountain, United States	Halfpipe	3rd
China	2018	December 22, 2017	Secret Garden, China	Halfpipe	1st
China	2019	December 20, 2018	Secret Garden, China	Halfpipe	1st
China	2019	February 16, 2019	Calgary, Canada	Halfpipe	3rd
China	2019	March 9, 2019	Copper Mountain, United States	Halfpipe	3rd
China	2019–2020	September 7, 2019	Cardrona, New Zealand	Halfpipe	1st
China	2023	January 1, 2023	Calgary, Canada	Halfpipe	3rd

== Results ==
=== Olympic Winter Games ===
Year	Age	Halfpipe
(South Korea) 2018 Peyeongchang	15	9
(China) 2022 Beijing	19	7
(Italy) 2026 Milano Cortina	23	6

=== World Championships ===
Year	Age	Halfpipe
(United States) 2019 Park City	16	8
(Georgia (country)) 2023 Bakuriani	20	4
(Switzerland) 2025 Engadin	22	7

=== World Cup ===
==== Season standings ====
Season	Age	Overall	Halfpipe
2018	15	15	3rd place, bronze medalist(s)
2019	16	15	3rd place, bronze medalist(s)
2020	17	9	3rd place, bronze medalist(s)
2021	18	10	4
2022	19	10	3rd place, bronze medalist(s)
2023	20	53	23
2024	21	33	10
2025	22	5	3rd place, bronze medalist(s)
