= 2018–19 FIS Freestyle Ski World Cup =

Freestyle skiing competitive season

Freestyle Ski World Cup 2018/19
Discipline	Men	Women
Overall	(Canada) Mikaël Kingsbury (8)	(France) Perrine Laffont
Moguls	(Canada) Mikaël Kingsbury (8)	(France) Perrine Laffont (2)
Aerials	(China) Wang Xindi	(China) Xu Mengtao (5)
Ski Cross	(France) Bastien Midol	(Switzerland) Fanny Smith
Halfpipe	(Canada) Simon d'Artois	(Canada) Cassie Sharpe (2)
Slopestyle	(United States) Mac Forehand	(Canada) Megan Oldham
Big Air	(Switzerland) Andri Ragettli	(Canada) Elena Gaskell
Cross Alps Tour	(France) Bastien Midol	(Sweden) Sandra Näslund (2)
- Nations Cup overall: Canada (11)

Competition

The 2018/19 FIS Freestyle Ski World Cup was the fortieth World Cup season in freestyle skiing organised by International Ski Federation. The season started on 7 September 2018 and ended on 30 March 2019. This season included six disciplines: moguls, aerials, ski cross, halfpipe, slopestyle and big air.

== Men ==
=== Ski Cross ===
Num	Season	Date	Place	Event	Winner	Second	Third
146	1	11 December 2018	(Switzerland) Arosa	SX	(Switzerland) Jonas Lenherr	(Sweden) Victor Öhling Norberg	(Switzerland) Alex Fiva
147	2	21 December 2018	(Italy) Innichen	SX	(France) Jonathan Midol	(France) Bastien Midol	(Canada) Brady Leman
148	3	22 December 2018	(Italy) Innichen	SX	(Switzerland) Joos Berry	(France) Bastien Midol	(France) Jonathan Midol
3rd Cross Alps Tour Overall (11–22 December 2018)					(France) Bastien Midol	(France) Jonathan Midol	(Canada) Brady Leman
149	4	19 January 2019	(Sweden) Idre	SX	(Switzerland) Alex Fiva	(France) Bastien Midol	(Austria) Daniel Traxler
150	5	20 January 2019	(Sweden) Idre	SX	(France) Jean-Frédéric Chapuis	(Austria) Daniel Traxler	(Switzerland) Romain Detraz
151	6	26 January 2019	(Canada) Blue Mountain	SX	(Canada) Brady Leman	(France) Bastien Midol	(Austria) Johannes Rohrweck
FIS Freestyle Ski World Championships 2019 (31 January- 10 February)
152	7	16 February 2019	(Germany) Feldberg	SX	(Switzerland) Ryan Regez	(Germany) Florian Wilmsmann	(Canada) Kevin Drury
153	8	17 February 2019	(Germany) Feldberg	SX	(France) Jean-Frédéric Chapuis	(Switzerland) Romain Detraz	(Switzerland) Ryan Regez
154	9	23 February 2019	(Russia) Sunny Valley	SX	(France) Bastien Midol	(Slovenia) Filip Flisar	(France) Jean-Frédéric Chapuis
155	10	24 February 2019	(Russia) Sunny Valley	SX	(France) Bastien Midol	(Switzerland) Alex Fiva	(Canada) Brady Leman
156	11	17 March 2019	(Switzerland) Veysonnaz	SX	(France) Jean-Frédéric Chapuis	(Canada) Brady Leman	(France) Bastien Midol

=== Moguls ===
Num	Season	Date	Place	Event	Winner	Second	Third
333	1	7 December 2018	(Finland) Ruka	MO	(Canada) Mikaël Kingsbury	(France) Benjamin Cavet	(Sweden) Walter Wallberg
334	2	15 December 2018	(China) Thaiwoo	MO	(Canada) Mikaël Kingsbury	(Japan) Ikuma Horishima	(Kazakhstan) Dmitriy Reiherd
335	3	12 January 2019	(Canada) Calgary	MO	(Canada) Mikaël Kingsbury	(Sweden) Walter Wallberg	(Japan) Daichi Hara
336	4	18 January 2019	(United States) Lake Placid	MO	(France) Benjamin Cavet	(Sweden) Walter Wallberg	(Australia) Matt Graham
337	5	26 January 2019	(Canada) Mont-Tremblant	MO	(Canada) Mikaël Kingsbury	(Japan) Ikuma Horishima	(Kazakhstan) Dmitriy Reiherd
FIS Freestyle Ski World Championships 2019 (31 January- 10 February)
338	6	23 February 2019	(Japan) Tazawako	MO	(Canada) Mikaël Kingsbury	(Canada) Philippe Marquis	(United States) Bradley Wilson
339	7	2 March 2019	(Kazakhstan) Shymbulak	MO	(Japan) Ikuma Horishima	(Canada) Mikaël Kingsbury	(Sweden) Walter Wallberg

=== Dual Moguls ===
Num	Season	Date	Place	Event	Winner	Second	Third
70	1	16 December 2018	(China) Thaiwoo	DM	(Canada) Mikaël Kingsbury	(Sweden) Oskar Elofsson	(France) Benjamin Cavet
FIS Freestyle Ski World Championships 2019 (31 January- 10 February)
71	2	24 February 2019	(Japan) Tazawako	DM	(Canada) Mikaël Kingsbury	(Japan) Ikuma Horishima	(France) Benjamin Cavet

=== Aerials ===
Num	Season	Date	Place	Event	Winner	Second	Third
331	1	19 January 2019	(United States) Lake Placid	AE	(Russia) Maxim Burov	(China) Wang Xindi	(Russia) Stanislav Nikitin
FIS Freestyle Ski World Championships 2019 (31 January- 10 February)
332	2	17 February 2019	(Russia) Moscow	AE	(Russia) Stanislav Nikitin	(China) Wang Xindi	(Switzerland) Noé Roth
333	3	23 February 2019	(Belarus) Minsk	AE	(Russia) Maxim Burov	(Belarus) Anton Kushnir	(Russia) Stanislav Nikitin
334	4	2 March 2019	(China) Shimao Lotus Mountain	AE	(China) Sun Jiaxu	(China) Wang Xindi	(United States) Eric Loughran
335	5	3 March 2019	(China) Shimao Lotus Mountain	AE	(China) Sun Jiaxu	(Switzerland) Noé Roth	(Belarus) Anton Kushnir

=== Halfpipe ===
Num	Season	Date	Place	Event	Winner	Second	Third
44	1	7 December 2018	(United States) Copper Mountain	HP	(United States) Aaron Blunck	(New Zealand) Miguel Porteous	(United States) David Wise
45	2	22 December 2018	(China) Secret Garden	HP	(Canada) Simon d'Artois	(New Zealand) Nico Porteous	(United States) Hunter Hess
FIS Freestyle Ski World Championships 2019 (31 January- 10 February)
46	3	16 February 2019	(Canada) Calgary	HP	(United States) David Wise	(New Zealand) Nico Porteous	(Canada) Noah Bowman
47	4	9 March 2019	(United States) Mammoth	HP	(United States) Birk Irving	(Canada) Simon d'Artois	(France) Thomas Krief

=== Big Air ===
Num	Season	Date	Place	Event	Winner	Second	Third
11	1	7 September 2018	(New Zealand) Cardrona	BA	(Switzerland) Andri Ragettli	(Canada) Evan McEachran	(New Zealand) Finn Bilous
12	2	4 November 2018	(Italy) Modena	BA	(Norway) Birk Ruud	(United States) Alexander Hall	(Switzerland) Andri Ragettli
FIS Freestyle Ski World Championships 2019 (31 January- 10 February)
13	3	16 March 2019	(Canada) Québec	BA	(Switzerland) Lukas Müllauer	(Switzerland) Fabian Bösch	(Switzerland) Andri Ragettli

=== Slopestyle ===
Num	Season	Date	Place	Event	Winner	Second	Third
30	1	24 November 2018	(Austria) Stubai	SS	(Sweden) Henrik Harlaut	(United States) Mac Forehand	(Norway) Ferdinand Dahl
31	2	12 January 2019	(France) Font Romeu	SS	(United States) Alexander Hall	(Canada) Philippe Langevin	(Switzerland) Andri Ragettli
32	3	27 January 2019	(Italy) Seiser Alm	SS	(Canada) Max Moffatt	(Sweden) Oliwer Magnusson	(United States) Kiernan Fagan
FIS Freestyle Ski World Championships 2019 (31 January- 10 February)
33	4	10 March 2019	(United States) Mammoth	SS	(United States) Mac Forehand	(Norway) Ferdinand Dahl	(United States) Kiernan Fagan
34	6	30 March 2019	(Switzerland) Silvaplana	SS	(Switzerland) Andri Ragettli	(United States) Colby Stevenson	(Switzerland) Fabian Bösch

== Ladies ==
=== Ski Cross ===
Num	Season	Date	Place	Event	Winner	Second	Third
147	1	11 December 2018	(Switzerland) Arosa	SX	(Switzerland) Fanny Smith	(Sweden) Sandra Näslund	(Canada) Marielle Thompson
148	2	21 December 2018	(Italy) Innichen	SX	(Switzerland) Fanny Smith	(Sweden) Sandra Näslund	(France) Marielle Berger-Sabbatel
149	3	22 December 2018	(Italy) Innichen	SX	(Sweden) Sandra Näslund	(Canada) Marielle Thompson	(Switzerland) Sanna Lüdi
3rd Cross Alps Tour Overall (11–22 December 2018)					(Sweden) Sandra Näslund	(Switzerland) Fanny Smith	(Canada) Marielle Thompson
150	4	19 January 2019	(Sweden) Idre	SX	(Germany) Heidi Zacher	(Canada) Marielle Thompson	(Switzerland) Fanny Smith
151	5	20 January 2019	(Sweden) Idre	SX	(Switzerland) Fanny Smith	(Canada) Brittany Phelan	(Canada) Kelsey Serwa
152	6	26 January 2019	(Canada) Blue Mountain	SX	(Switzerland) Fanny Smith	(Canada) Marielle Thompson	(France) Alizée Baron
FIS Freestyle Ski World Championships 2019 (31 January- 10 February)
153	7	16 February 2019	(Germany) Feldberg	SX	(Sweden) Sandra Näslund	(Sweden) Lisa Andersson	(France) Alizée Baron
154	8	17 February 2019	(Germany) Feldberg	SX	(Sweden) Sandra Näslund	(Austria) Andrea Limbacher	(Canada) Brittany Phelan
155	9	23 February 2019	(Russia) Sunny Valley	SX	(Switzerland) Fanny Smith	(Sweden) Sandra Näslund	(Austria) Andrea Limbacher
156	10	24 February 2019	(Russia) Sunny Valley	SX	(Switzerland) Fanny Smith	(Switzerland) Sanna Lüdi	(France) Alizée Baron
157	11	17 March 2019	(Switzerland) Veysonnaz	SX	(Canada) Marielle Thompson	(Sweden) Sandra Näslund	(France) Alizée Baron

=== Moguls ===
Num	Season	Date	Place	Event	Winner	Second	Third
334	1	7 December 2018	(Finland) Ruka	MO	(France) Perrine Laffont	(Kazakhstan) Yulia Galysheva	(United States) Tess Johnson
335	2	15 December 2018	(China) Thaiwoo	MO	(United States) Jaelin Kauf	(Australia) Jakara Anthony	(France) Perrine Laffont
336	3	12 January 2019	(Canada) Calgary	MO	(Kazakhstan) Yulia Galysheva	(France) Perrine Laffont	(United States) Jaelin Kauf
337	4	18 January 2019	(United States) Lake Placid	MO	(Australia) Jakara Anthony	(France) Perrine Laffont	(United States) Tess Johnson
338	5	26 January 2019	(Canada) Mont-Tremblant	MO	(France) Perrine Laffont	(Australia) Jakara Anthony	(Canada) Justine Dufour-Lapointe
FIS Freestyle Ski World Championships 2019 (31 January- 10 February)
339	6	23 February 2019	(Japan) Tazawako	MO	(France) Perrine Laffont	(Australia) Jakara Anthony	(Kazakhstan) Yulia Galysheva
340	7	2 March 2019	(Kazakhstan) Shymbulak	MO	(Kazakhstan) Yulia Galysheva	(France) Perrine Laffont	(Canada) Justine Dufour-Lapointe

=== Dual Moguls ===
Num	Season	Date	Place	Event	Winner	Second	Third
69	1	16 December 2018	(China) Thaiwoo	DM	(United States) Jaelin Kauf	(France) Perrine Laffont	(Kazakhstan) Yuliya Galysheva
FIS Freestyle Ski World Championships 2019 (31 January- 10 February)
70	2	24 February 2019	(Japan) Tazawako	DM	(France) Perrine Laffont	(United States) Jaelin Kauf	(Australia) Jakara Anthony

=== Aerials ===
Num	Season	Date	Place	Event	Winner	Second	Third
336	1	19 January 2019	(United States) Lake Placid	AE	(China) Xu Mengtao	(China) Shao Qi	(China) Xu Nuo
FIS Freestyle Ski World Championships 2019 (31 January- 10 February)
337	2	17 February 2019	(Russia) Moscow	AE	(Belarus) Aliaksandra Ramanouskaya	(Australia) Laura Peel	(China) Xu Mengtao
338	3	23 February 2019	(Belarus) Minsk	AE	(China) Xu Mengtao	(China) Xu Sicun	(China) Shao Qi
339	4	2 March 2019	(China) Shimao Lotus Mountain	AE	(Australia) Laura Peel	(China) Xu Sicun	(United States) Ashley Caldwell
340	5	3 March 2019	(China) Shimao Lotus Mountain	AE	(China) Xu Mengtao	(United States) Ashley Caldwell	(China) Xu Sicun

=== Halfpipe ===
Num	Season	Date	Place	Event	Winner	Second	Third
44	1	7 December 2018	(United States) Copper Mountain	HP	(Estonia) Kelly Sildaru	(Canada) Cassie Sharpe	(United States) Brita Sigourney
45	2	22 December 2018	(China) Secret Garden	HP	(China) Zhang Kexin	(Canada) Rachael Karker	(China) Li Fanghui
FIS Freestyle Ski World Championships 2019 (31 January- 10 February)
46	3	16 February 2019	(Canada) Calgary	HP	(Canada) Cassie Sharpe	(Canada) Rachael Karker	(China) Zhang Kexin
47	4	9 March 2019	(United States) Mammoth	HP	(Canada) Cassie Sharpe	(Estonia) Kelly Sildaru	(China) Zhang Kexin

=== Big Air ===
Num	Season	Date	Place	Event	Winner	Second	Third
11	1	7 September 2018	(New Zealand) Cardrona	BA	(Canada) Elena Gaskell	(United States) Caroline Claire	(Japan) Yuki Tsubota
12	2	4 November 2018	(Italy) Modena	BA	(Switzerland) Mathilde Gremaud	(Switzerland) Sarah Höfflin	(Germany) Kea Kühnel
FIS Freestyle Ski World Championships 2019 (31 January- 10 February)
13	3	16 March 2019	(Canada) Québec	BA	(Switzerland) Mathilde Gremaud	(Germany) Kea Kühnel	(Canada) Elena Gaskell

=== Slopestyle ===
Num	Season	Date	Place	Event	Winner	Second	Third
30	1	23 November 2018	(Austria) Stubai	SS	(Estonia) Kelly Sildaru	(Switzerland) Sarah Höfflin	(Switzerland) Mathilde Gremaud
31	2	12 January 2019	(France) Font Romeu	SS	(Switzerland) Sarah Höfflin	(United States) Eileen Gu	(Switzerland) Giulia Tanno
32	3	27 January 2019	(Italy) Seiser Alm	SS	(United States) Eileen Gu	(Canada) Megan Oldham	(United States) Julia Krass
FIS Freestyle Ski World Championships 2019 (31 January- 10 February)
33	4	10 March 2019	(United States) Mammoth	SS	(Switzerland) Mathilde Gremaud	(Norway) Johanne Killi	(Canada) Megan Oldham
34	6	30 March 2019	(Switzerland) Silvaplana	SS	(Canada) Megan Oldham	(France) Tess Ledeux	(Italy) Silvia Bertagna

== Team ==
=== Team Aerials ===
Num	Season	Date	Place	Event	Winner	Second	Third
FIS Freestyle Ski World Championships 2019 (31 January- 10 February)
341	1	3 March 2019	(China) Shimao Lotus Mountain	AET	China I Xu Mengtao; Sun Jiaxu; Wang Xindi	China II Xu Sicun; Yang Longxiao; Wu Shudi	China III Jia Liya; Li Boyan; Yang Renlong

== Men's standings ==
=== Overall ===
Rank	after all 37 races	Points
1	(Canada) Mikaël Kingsbury	91.67
2	(France) Bastien Midol	68.73
3	(China) Wang Xindi	63.20
4	(China) Sun Jiaxu	59.60
5	(Japan) Ikuma Horishima	57.44

=== Ski Cross ===
Rank	after all 11 races	Points
1	(France) Bastien Midol	756
2	(France) Jean-Frédéric Chapuis	572
3	(Switzerland) Alex Fiva	503
4	(Canada) Brady Leman	419
5	(Germany) Florian Wilmsmann	307

=== Cross Alps Tour ===
Rank	after all 3 races	Points
1	(France) Bastien Midol	210
2	(France) Jonathan Midol	160
3	(Canada) Brady Leman	126
4	(Switzerland) Joos Berry	121
5	(Switzerland) Alex Fiva	119

=== Moguls ===
Rank	after all 9 races	Points
1	(Canada) Mikael Kingsbury	825
2	(Japan) Ikuma Horishima	517
3	(France) Benjamin Cavet	470
4	(Sweden) Walter Wallberg	461
5	(Australia) Matt Graham	343

=== Aerials ===
Rank	after all 5 events	Points
1	(China) Wang Xindi	316
2	(China) Sun Jiaxu	298
3	(Belarus) Anton Kushnir	249
4	(Russia) Maxim Burov	236
5	(Russia) Stanislav Nikitin	220

=== Halfpipe ===
Rank	after all 4 races	Points
1	(Canada) Simon d'Artois	256
2	(New Zealand) Nico Porteous	225
3	(United States) David Wise	210
4	(United States) Hunter Hess	178
5	(France) Thomas Krief	164

=== Big Air ===
Rank	after all 3 races	Points
1	(Switzerland) Andri Ragettli	220
2	(Norway) Birk Ruud	172
3	(Switzerland) Fabian Bösch	130
4	(Austria) Lukas Müllauer	105
5	(Canada) Evan McEachran	104

=== Slopestyle ===
Rank	after all 5 races	Points
1	(United States) Mac Forehand	247
2	(Canada) Max Moffatt	213
3	(Switzerland) Andri Ragettli	205
4	(Sweden) Oliwer Magnusson	185
5	(United States) Colby Stevenson	167

== Ladies' standings ==
=== Overall ===
Rank	after all 37 races	Points
1	(France) Perrine Laffont	86.67
2	(China) Xu Mengtao	82.00
3	(Switzerland) Fanny Smith	72.64
4	(Sweden) Sandra Näslund	68.64
5	(United States) Jaelin Kauf	63.33

=== Ski Cross ===
Rank	after all 11 races	Points
1	(Switzerland) Fanny Smith	799
2	(Sweden) Sandra Näslund	755
3	(Canada) Marielle Thompson	656
4	(France) Alizee Baron	484
5	(Canada) Brittany Phelan	467

=== Cross Alps Tour ===
Rank	after all 3 races	Points
1	(Sweden) Sandra Näslund	260
2	(Switzerland) Fanny Smith	245
3	(Canada) Marielle Thompson	190
4	(France) Marielle Berger-Sabbatel	125
5	(Switzerland) Sanna Lüdi	111

=== Moguls ===
Rank	after all 9 races	Points
1	(France) Perrine Laffont	780
2	(United States) Jaelin Kauf	570
3	(Australia) Jakara Anthony	545
4	(Kazakhstan) Yulia Galysheva	533
5	(United States) Tess Johnson	349

=== Aerials ===
Rank	after all 5 events	Points
1	(China) Xu Mengtao	410
2	(China) Xu Sicun	299
3	(Australia) Laura Peel	256
4	(United States) Ashley Caldwell	240
5	(China) Qi Shao	202

=== Halfpipe ===
Rank	after all 4 races	Points
1	(Canada) Cassie Sharpe	280
2	(Canada) Rachael Karker	260
3	(China) Zhang Kexin	256
4	(Estonia) Kelly Sildaru	180
5	(China) Fanghui Li	156

=== Big Air ===
Rank	after all 3 races	Points
1	(Canada) Elena Gaskell	210
2	(Switzerland) Mathilde Gremaud	200
3	(Germany) Kea Kühnel	140
4	(Italy) Silvia Bertagna	118
5	(Canada) Yuki Tsubota	110

=== Slopestyle ===
Rank	after all 5 races	Points
1	(Canada) Megan Oldham	281
2	(Switzerland) Sarah Höfflin	280
3	(United States) Eileen Gu	204
4	(Switzerland) Mathilde Gremaud	192
5	(Italy) Silvia Bertagna	184

== Nations Cup ==
=== Overall ===
Rank	after all 75 races	Points
1	Canada	6266
2	United States	4980
3	Switzerland	4505
4	France	4206
5	Sweden	2699
