= Amy Fraser =

Canadian freestyle skier (born 1995)

Personal information
- Born: 29 March 1995 (age 31) Halifax, Nova Scotia, Canada

Sport
- Country: Canada
- Sport: Freestyle skiing
- Event: Half-pipe

Amy Fraser (born 29 March 1995) is a Canadian freestyle skier who competes internationally in the half-pipe discipline. She represented Canada at the 2022 and 2026 Winter Olympics.

== Biography ==
Amy Fraser was born on March 29, 1995, in Halifax, Nova Scotia, Canada. She began skiing at the age of two, but did not start freestyle skiing until her early twenties. She graduated from the University of Calgary with a Bachelor of Science in biological sciences in 2016.

== Career ==
Fraser has been part of the national team since 2019. During the 2021-22 World Cup Season, Fraser finished in the top ten in three of four events, including a career-best 6th in Calgary.

On January 24, 2022, Fraser was named to Canada's 2022 Olympic team in the halfpipe event.

In February 2024, Fraser won her first World Cup gold in the halfpipe ski category.

== Results ==
=== Olympic Winter Games ===
Year	Age	Halfpipe
(China) 2022 Beijing	26	8
(Italy) 2026 Milano Cortina	30	4

=== World Championships ===
Year	Age	Halfpipe
(United States) 2021 Aspen	25	9
(Georgia (country)) 2023 Bakuriani	27	5
(Switzerland) 2025 Engadin	29	12

=== World Cup ===
==== Season standings ====
Season	Age	Overall	Halfpipe
2020	24	107	20
2021	25	38	9
2022	26	20	8
2023	27	9	2nd place, silver medalist(s)
2024	28	4	2nd place, silver medalist(s)
2025	29	16	8
