= Li Fanghui =

Chinese freestyle skier (born 2003)

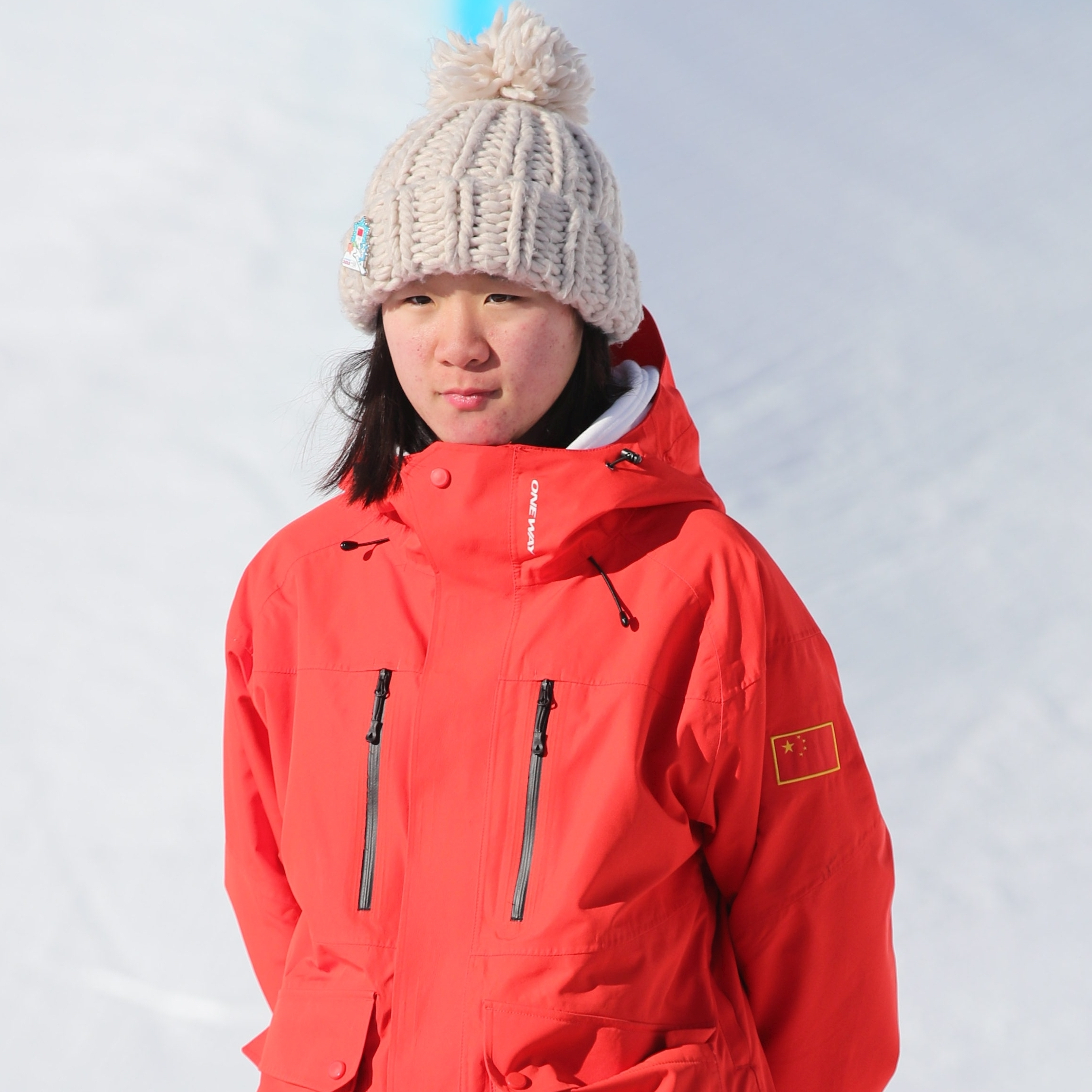
- Li at the 2020 Winter Youth Olympics

Personal information
- Born: 10 March 2003 (age 23) Harbin, China

Sport
- Sport: Freestyle skiing
- Event: Halfpipe
Medal record
Women's freestyle skiing
Representing China
Olympic Games
Silver medal – second place	2026 Milano Cortina	Halfpipe
World Championships
Silver medal – second place	2025 Engadin	Halfpipe
Asian Winter Games
Gold medal – first place	2025 Harbin	Halfpipe
Winter Youth Olympics
Silver medal – second place	2020 Lausanne	Halfpipe

Li Fanghui (Chinese: 李方慧; pinyin: Lǐ Fānghuì, born 10 March 2003) is a Chinese freestyle skier. She competed at the 2022 and the 2026 Winter Olympics.

== Career ==
Li made her FIS Freestyle World Ski Championships debut in 2019 and finished in fifth place in the halfpipe event.

She competed at the 2020 Winter Youth Olympics and won a silver medal in the halfpipe event.

Li represented China at the 2022 Winter Olympics in the halfpipe event.

During the 2024–25 FIS Freestyle Ski World Cup, she jointly won the halfpipe crystal globe along with Zoe Atkin.

In February 2025, she competed at the 2025 Asian Winter Games and won a gold medal in the halfpipe event with a score of 95.25. This was China's first gold of the 2025 Asian Winter Games.

In January 2026, she was selected to represent China at the 2026 Winter Olympics. She won a silver medal in the halfpipe event with a score of 93.00.

== Results ==
=== Olympic Winter Games ===
Year	Age	Halfpipe
(China) 2022 Beijing	18	5
(Italy) 2026 Milano Cortina	22	2

=== World Championships ===
Year	Age	Halfpipe
(United States) 2019 Park City	15	5
(Switzerland) 2025 Engadin	21	2

=== World Cup ===
==== Season standings ====
Season	Age	Overall	Halfpipe
2019	15	34	5
2020	16	11	4
2022	18	14	5
2024	20	33	14
2025	21	7	1st place, gold medalist(s)
