= FIS Freestyle Ski and Snowboarding World Championships 2025 – Women's ski halfpipe =

Women's ski halfpipe at the FIS Freestyle Ski and Snowboarding World Championships 2025
- Location: Corvatsch, Switzerland
- Date: 28 March (qualification); 30 March (final)
- Competitors: 18 from 9 nations
- Winning points: 93.50

Medalists
gold medal	Zoe Atkin	Great Britain
silver medal	Li Fanghui	China
bronze medal	Cassie Sharpe	Canada

The Women's ski halfpipe competition at the FIS Freestyle Ski and Snowboarding World Championships 2025 was held on 28 and 30 March 2025.

== Qualification ==
The qualification was started on 28 March at 10:00. The twelve best skiers qualified for the final.

Rank	Bib	Name	Country	Run 1	Run 2	Best	Notes
1	2	Li Fanghui	China	95.00	DNI	95.00	Q
2	1	Zoe Atkin	Great Britain	92.50	93.75	93.75	Q
3	4	Rachael Karker	Canada	80.00	86.00	86.00	Q
4	7	Zhang Keixin	China	84.25	DNI	84.25	Q
5	5	Cassie Sharpe	Canada	82.25	83.75	83.75	Q
6	8	Dillan Glennie	Canada	83.25	DNI	83.25	Q
7	3	Amy Fraser	Canada	8.00	80.00	80.00	Q
8	6	Svea Irving	United States	76.75	79.50	79.50	Q
9	11	Chen Zihan	China	74.75	78.75	78.75	Q
10	10	Kate Gray	United States	71.50	78.25	78.25	Q
11	12	Liu Yishan	China	73.50	73.75	73.75	Q
12	17	Mischa Thomas	New Zealand	15.25	71.00	71.00	Q
13	9	Sabrina Cakmakli	Germany	66.50	69.00	69.00	
14	14	Nanaho Kiryama	Japan	58.25	60.75	60.75	
15	16	Hanna Lamm	United States	50.50	58.75	58.75	
16	13	Piper Arnold	United States	55.50	57.00	57.00	
17	15	Jang Yu-jin	South Korea	45.50	47.50	47.50	
18	18	Jeanee Crane-Mauzy	Vanuatu	40.00	DNI	40.00	

== Final ==
The final was started on 30 March at 10:00. The twelve best skiers qualified for the final.

Rank	Bib	Start order	Name	Country	Run 1	Run 2	Best
1st place, gold medalist(s)	1	11	Zoe Atkin	Great Britain	18.75	93.50	93.50
2nd place, silver medalist(s)	2	12	Li Fanghui	China	90.25	93.00	93.00
3rd place, bronze medalist(s)	5	8	Cassie Sharpe	Canada	75.75	88.00	88.00
4	4	10	Rachael Karker	Canada	86.25	DNI	86.25
5	6	5	Svea Irving	United States	83.25	83.25	83.25
6	11	4	Chen Zihan	China	79.25	DNI	79.25
7	7	9	Zhang Keixin	China	71.75	DNI	71.75
8	12	2	Liu Yishan	China	67.25	69.75	69.75
9	17	1	Mischa Thomas	New Zealand	56.00	DNI	56.00
10	10	3	Kate Gray	United States	3.25	52.25	52.25
11	8	7	Dillan Glennie	Canada	Did not start		
12	3	6	Amy Fraser	Canada	Did not start		
