= Carly Margulies =

American freestyle skier

Personal information
- Born: December 24, 1997 (age 28) Mammoth Lakes, California, U.S.
- Height: 5 ft 2 in (157 cm)
- Weight: 115 lb (52 kg)

Sport
- Country: United States
- Sport: Freestyle skiing
- Event: Halfpipe
- Club: Mammoth Mountain Freeski Team

Carly Margulies (born December 24, 1997) is an American freestyle skier who competed in the 2022 Winter Olympics in the women's halfpipe.

== Personal life ==
Margulies has been skiing since the age of eleven. Between 2015 and 2018, she has had seven knee surgeries. She currently resides in Park City, Utah.
