= Kate Gray =

American freestyle skier (born 2006)

Personal information
- Full name: Kathryn Gray
- Born: June 29, 2006 (age 20) Mammoth Lakes, California, U.S.

Sport
- Country: United States
- Sport: Freestyle skiing
- Event: Halfpipe
Medal record
Women's freestyle skiing
Representing the United States
Winter Youth Olympics
Bronze medal – third place	2024 Gangwon	Halfpipe

Kathryn Gray (born June 29, 2006) is an American freestyle skier who specializes in the halfpipe discipline. She represented the United States at the 2026 Winter Olympics.

== Career ==
Gray competed at the 2024 Winter Youth Olympics and won a bronze medal in the halfpipe event with a score of 79.25. She made her FIS Freestyle World Ski Championships debut in 2025 and competed in all three freeski disciplines. She became the first American athlete to compete in all three freeski events. Her best finish was tenth place in the halfpipe event.

In January 2026, she was selected to represent the United States at the 2026 Winter Olympics. During the halfpipe qualification she scored 74.75 and advanced to the finals.

== Results ==
=== Olympic Winter Games ===
Year	Age	Halfpipe
(Italy) 2026 Milano Cortina	19	10

=== World Championships ===
Year	Age	Slopestyle	Big Air	Halfpipe
(Switzerland) 2025 Engadin	18	21	DNS	10
