= Winter X Games XXVII =

2023 extreme sports tournament

- Venue: Buttermilk Ski Resort
- Location: Aspen, United States
- Dates: 27–30 January 2023

Winter X Games XXVII was held from 27 to 30 January 2023 in Aspen, Colorado, United States. This was the 22nd consecutive Winter X Games held in Aspen. The event was broadcast on ESPN.

Participating athletes competed in eight skiing events and eight snowboarding events.

== Medal table ==
* Host nation (United States)

Rank	Nation	Gold	Silver	Bronze	Total
1	United States (USA)*	3	3	3	9
2	Canada (CAN)	3	2	1	6
3	Norway (NOR)	2	1	3	6
4	Australia (AUS)	1	1	1	3
4	Japan (JPN)	1	1	1	3
6	New Zealand (NZL)	1	1	0	2
7	Great Britain (GBR)	1	0	2	3
8	South Korea (KOR)	1	0	0	1
8	Sweden (SWE)	1	0	0	1
10	Switzerland (SUI)	0	2	0	2
11	Austria (AUT)	0	1	0	1
11	France (FRA)	0	1	0	1
11	Iceland (ISL)	0	1	0	1
14	China (CHN)	0	0	2	2
15	Finland (FIN)	0	0	1	1
Totals (15 entries)		14	14	14	42

== Medal summary ==
=== Snowboard ===
Event	Gold	Silver	Bronze
Men's Slopestyle	Mark McMorris; Canada	Marcus Kleveland; Norway	Mons Røisland; Norway
Men's SuperPipe	Scotty James; Australia	Jan Scherrer; Switzerland	Valentino Guseli; Australia
Men's Big Air	Marcus Kleveland; Norway	Takeru Otsuka; Japan	Su Yiming; China
Women's Slopestyle	Zoi Sadowski-Synnott; New Zealand	Tess Coady; Australia	Kokomo Murase; Japan
Women's SuperPipe	Choi Ga-on; South Korea	Maddie Mastro; United States	Cai Xuetong; China
Women's Big Air	Reira Iwabuchi; Japan	Zoi Sadowski-Synnott; New Zealand	Laurie Blouin; Canada
Knuckle Huck	Marcus Kleveland; Norway	Halldór Helgason; Iceland	Dusty Henricksen; United States

=== Ski ===
Event	Gold	Silver	Bronze
Men's Slopestyle	Colby Stevenson; United States	Mac Forehand; United States	Ferdinand Dahl; Norway
Men's SuperPipe	David Wise; United States	Birk Irving; United States	Jon Sallinen; Finland
Men's Big Air	Mac Forehand; United States	Teal Harle; Canada	Birk Ruud; Norway
Women's Slopestyle	Megan Oldham; Canada	Mathilde Gremaud; Switzerland	Kirsty Muir; Great Britain
Women's SuperPipe	Zoe Atkin; Great Britain	Rachael Karker; Canada	Svea Irving; United States
Women's Big Air	Megan Oldham; Canada	Tess Ledeux; France	Kirsty Muir; Great Britain
Knuckle Huck	Jesper Tjäder; Sweden	Matěj Švancer; Austria	Colby Stevenson; United States
