= Cassie Sharpe =

Canadian freestyle skier (born 1992)

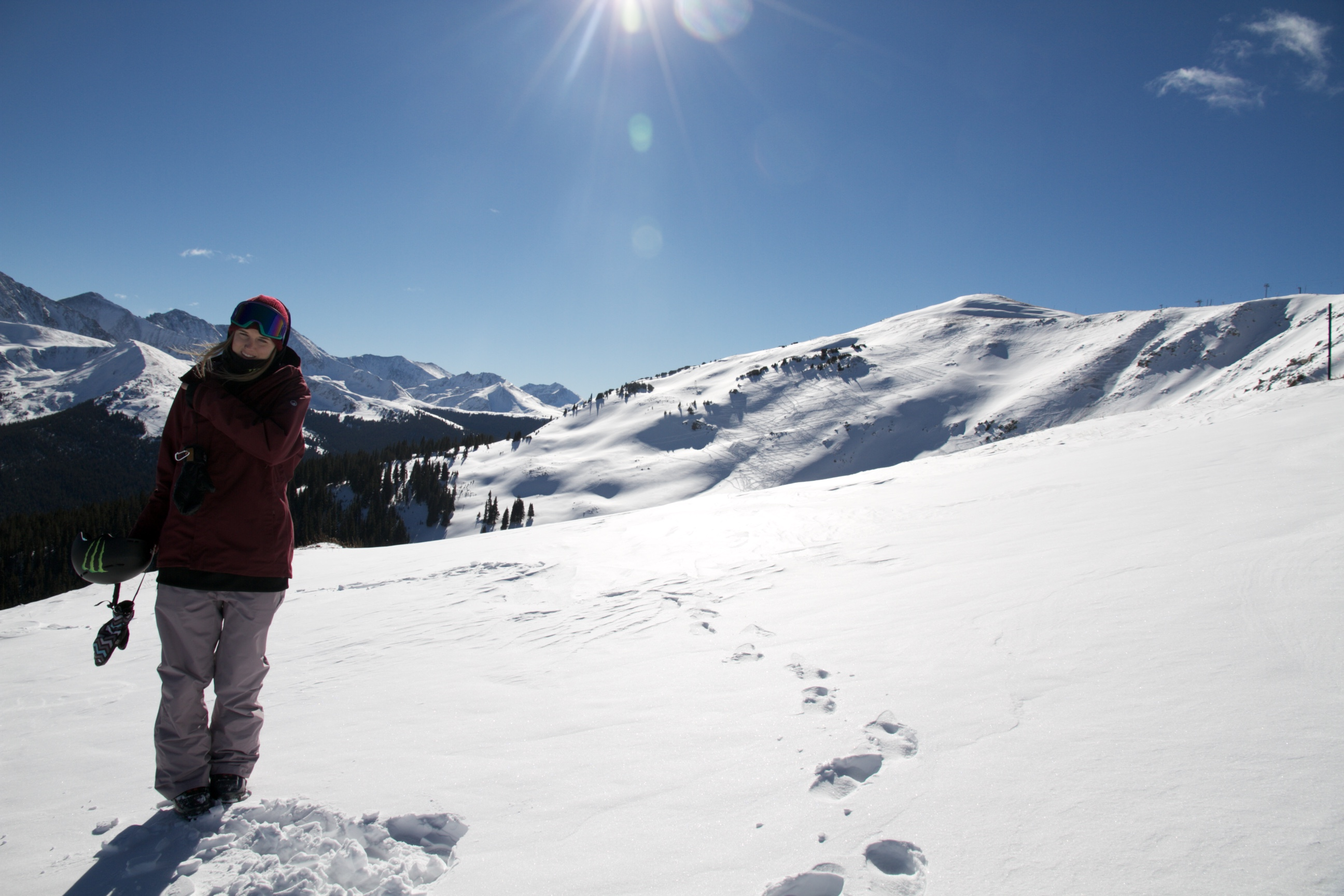
- Cassie Sharpe at Copper Mountain in December 2015.

Personal information
- Nickname: Cass
- Nationality: Canadian
- Born: September 14, 1992 (age 33) Calgary, Alberta
- Height: 174 cm (5 ft 9 in)
- Weight: 69 kg (152 lb)

Sport
- Country: Canada
- Sport: Freestyle skiing
- Event: Halfpipe
Medal record
Women's freestyle skiing
Representing Canada
Winter Olympics
Silver medal – second place	2022 Beijing	Halfpipe
Gold medal – first place	2018 Pyeongchang	Halfpipe
World Championships
Bronze medal – third place	2025 Engadin	Halfpipe
Silver medal – second place	2019 Utah	Halfpipe
Silver medal – second place	2015 Kreischberg	Halfpipe
Winter X Games
Silver medal – second place	2021 Aspen	Superpipe
Bronze medal – third place	2020 Aspen	Superpipe
Gold medal – first place	2019 Aspen	Superpipe
Bronze medal – third place	2018 Aspen	Superpipe
Gold medal – first place	2016 Oslo	Superpipe

Cassie Sharpe (born September 14, 1992) is a Canadian freestyle skier. Sharpe became the Olympic champion in women's halfpipe after winning gold in Pyeongchang, South Korea at the 2018 Winter Olympics. She won a silver medal at the 2015 World Championships in halfpipe in Kreischberg and won gold and bronze in superpipe at the Winter X Games in 2016 and 2018, respectively.

== Career ==
She grew up in Comox, British Columbia on Vancouver Island and learned how to ski with her family, skiing for the first time with her brothers at age 11. Her parents enrolled her in Bumps and Jumps at Mount Washington in 2004. Sharpe competed in moguls, aerials, and slopestyle in her early years. Later she would win her first halfpipe event in 2012, which would get her into the discipline.

Sharpe announced her arrival on the international scene in halfpipe when she won silver at the 2015 World Championships. She would say of her last run and coaching later that "I went big for the last run and brought all the pieces together that I've worked so hard for. We had a crazy training camp in Calgary before coming here, and my coaches were amazing. They made me a better skier in a week, and I owe my consistency to them". Some discounted her win as most of the competitive skiers were at Winter X Games XIX that year, which was scheduled at the same time as the World Championships. Sharpe would back up her podium pedigree with a gold medal win on the 2014–15 FIS Freestyle Skiing World Cup to end the season. She also placed second in the Breckenridge Dew Tour in 2015.

She would make her X Games debut in January 2016, where she placed fourth. Unknowingly she was competing with a stress fracture in her back that occurred in December 2015 but was only diagnosed by an MRI scan after the X Games. Wearing a back brace, Sharpe would win gold at Winter X Games Oslo in 2016. She would follow up her X Games Gold with a World Cup gold at the event in Tignes, France. While qualifying in Tignes, she broke her thumb after a fall. Sharpe would tape up her thumb and, later in the event, became the first woman ever to land a switch cork 720 in competition. She would later have surgery to reconnect the ligament and remove a bone fragment in her thumb.

To start the 2017–18 World Cup season, Sharpe won the halfpipe event at Cardrona, New Zealand. She would also win gold Snowmass, Colorado and gold on the Dew Tour. Sharpe would build on this success into the 2018 Winter Olympics, her first Olympic competition. Sharpe qualified first overall for the halfpipe final. There her first two runs both would have had her in first atop the podium; her third run was a victory lap. She credited her Olympic training to practicing every day, saying of her frequent practices that it was "so much to the point that I'm like 'I don't want to anymore, I want to have fun.' But it is fun for me. My job is my favourite thing to do." Sharpe concluded the World Cup season with a gold medal win in Tignes, which made her the Crystal Globe winner for the women's halfpipe season. She commented: "I'm really excited at how the year went. Every contest was a new challenge unto itself, but I'm so stoked to finish the year as the overall winner."

On January 24, 2022, Sharpe was named to Canada's 2022 Olympic team. Sharpe would win the silver medal in the women's halfpipe event.

In February 2026 Sharpe competed in her third Winter Olympics. She had the third best qualifying score and made the final in the Women's skiing halfpipe. She lost consciousness in a bad fall on her qualifying second run and was not medically cleared to compete in the final due to a heavy concussion and dizziness.

== Personal life ==
She is sister to YouTuber Doug Sharpe and Darcy Sharpe. Sharpe now currently lives in Vancouver.

After her second Olympic medal, Sharpe took a break from competition for two years, during which she gave birth to her daughter.

== Results ==
=== Olympic Winter Games ===
Year	Age	Halfpipe
(South Korea) 2018 Pyeongchang	25	Gold
(China) 2022 Beijing	29	Silver
(Italy) 2026 Milano Cortina	33	12

=== World Championships ===
Year	Age	Halfpipe
(Austria) 2015 Kreischberg	22	Silver
(Spain) 2017 Sierra Nevada	24	25
(United States) 2019 Park City	26	Silver
(Switzerland) 2025 Engadin	32	Bronze

=== World Cup ===
==== Season standings ====
Season	Age	Overall	Halfpipe
2012	19	139	29
2013	20	153	32
2014	21	154	30
2015	22	31	4
2016	23	77	12
2017	24	22	4
2018	25	7	1st place, gold medalist(s)
2019	26	11	1st place, gold medalist(s)
2020	27	68	14
2022	29	19	7
2025	32	17	5
