= Indra Brown =

Australian freestyle skier (born 2010)

Personal information
- Born: January 29, 2010 (age 16) East Melbourne, Australia

Sport
- Country: Australia
- Sport: Freestyle skiing
- Event: Halfpipe skiing
Medal record
Women's snowboarding
Representing Australia
Winter X Games
Silver medal – second place	2026 Aspen	Superpipe
World Junior Championships
Gold medal – first place	2026 Calgary	Halfpipe

Indra Brown (born January 29, 2010) is an Australian freestyle skier. She represented Australia at the 2026 Winter Olympics.

== Career ==
During the 2025–26 FIS Freestyle Ski World Cup, Brown made her World Cup debut on 12 December 2025 and earned her first World Cup podium finishing in third place. Her third-place finish was the best ever result for an Australian during a World Cup debut, beating the previous record of two-time Olympic medallist Torah Bright's fourth-place finish in September 2003. The next week, on 20 December 2025, she earned a second place podium finish with a score of 80.00. On 3 January 2026, she earned her third consecutive podium finish, and first career World Cup victory, with a score of 85.20. At 15 years old, she became the youngest Australian to claim a World Cup victory.

She then made her X Games debut in January 2026, where she was the youngest athlete at the competition. She won a silver medal in the superpipe event, becoming the youngest medalist in the event's history at 15 years old.

She was named to Australia's roster for the 2026 Winter Olympics. At 15 years old, she was the youngest athlete selected to represent Australia. She competed in the halfpipe event and finished in fifth place with a score of 87.00. In March 2026, she competed at the FIS Freestyle Junior World Ski Championships and won a gold medal in the halfpipe event with a score of 92.00.

== Personal life ==
Brown was born to Grant and Anne Brown. Her father made headlines when he chased down and restrained a teenager attempting to break into his home in just his underwear, and was dubbed "Captain Underpants" by his neighbours.

== Results ==
=== Olympic Winter Games ===
As of 27 February 2026

Year	Age	Halfpipe
(Italy) 2026 Milano Cortina	16	5

=== World Cup results by season ===
As of 27 February 2026

Season	Halfpipe skiing				
Season	Events started	Wins	Pods	Points	Rank
2025–26	4	1	3	290	1
