= Mischa Thomas =

New Zealand freestyle skier (born 2008)

Personal information
- Born: March 19, 2008 (age 18) Auckland, New Zealand

Sport
- Country: New Zealand
- Sport: Freestyle skiing
- Events: Halfpipe, Slopestyle
Medal record
Women's snowboarding
Representing New Zealand
World Junior Championships
Bronze medal – third place	2023 Cardrona	Slopestyle

Mischa Thomas (born 19 March 2008) is a New Zealand freestyle skier. She represented New Zealand at the 2026 Winter Olympics.

== Career ==
In January 2026, she was selected to represent New Zealand at the 2026 Winter Olympics. During the halfpipe qualification she scored 77.50 and advanced to the finals.

== Personal life ==
Thomas was born to Daniel and Nina Thomas. She is a triplet, and has four siblings.

== Results ==
=== Olympic Winter Games ===
Year	Age	Halfpipe
(Italy) 2026 Milano Cortina	17	8

=== World Championships ===
Year	Age	Halfpipe
(Switzerland) 2025 Engadin	16	9
