= Lyman Currier =

American freestyle skier

Personal information
- Born: August 28, 1994 (age 31) Louisville, Colorado, U.S.

Sport
- Country: United States
- Sport: Freestyle skiing

Lyman Currier (born August 28, 1994) is an American freestyle skier. Currier competed at the 2014 Winter Olympics in Sochi, Russia.
