= Britt Hawes =

New Zealand freestyle skier

Personal information
- Born: 13 March 1990 (age 35)

Sport
- Country: New Zealand
- Sport: Freestyle skiing
- Event: Halfpipe

Britt Hawes (born 13 March 1990) is a New Zealand freestyle skier who competes internationally. She represented New Zealand in the 2018 Winter Olympics.
