= Rachael Karker =

Canadian freestyle skier (born 1997)

Personal information
- Born: September 9, 1997 (age 29) Guelph, Ontario, Canada

Sport
- Country: Canadian
- Sport: Freestyle skiing
- Event: Halfpipe
- Club: Blue Mountain
Medal record
Women's freestyle skiing
Representing Canada
Winter Olympics
Bronze medal – third place	2022 Beijing	Halfpipe
World Championships
Silver medal – second place	2021 Aspen	Halfpipe
Bronze medal – third place	2023 Bakuriani	Halfpipe
Winter X Games
Silver medal – second place	2020 Aspen	Superpipe
Silver medal – second place	2023 Aspen	Superpipe
Bronze medal – third place	2019 Aspen	Superpipe
Bronze medal – third place	2021 Aspen	Superpipe

Rachael Karker (born September 9, 1997) is a Canadian freestyle skier. She is the 2022 Winter Olympic bronze medalist in halfpipe, a two-time World medalist, and a four-time Winter X Games medalist.

== Career ==
Karker competed at the FIS Freestyle Ski and Snowboarding World Championships 2019, where she placed fourth in the halfpipe.

She placed second at the 2018–19 and 2019–20 FIS World Cup standings and won silver at the FIS Freestyle Ski and Snowboarding World Championships 2021 in the halfpipe.

On January 24, 2022, Karker was named to Canada's 2022 Olympic team. Karker would win the bronze medal in the women's halfpipe event.

== Personal life ==
Karker was born in Guelph, Ontario, on September 9, 1997.

== Results ==
=== Olympic Winter Games ===
Year	Age	Halfpipe
(China) 2022 Beijing	24	Bronze
(Italy) 2026 Milano Cortina	28	7

=== World Championships ===
Year	Age	Halfpipe
(United States) 2019 Deer Valley	21	4
(United States) 2021 Aspen	23	Silver
(Georgia (country)) 2023 Bakuriani	25	Bronze
(Switzerland) 2025 Engadin	27	4

=== World Cup ===
==== Season standings ====
Season	Age	Overall	Halfpipe
2019	21	18	6
2020	22	8	2nd place, silver medalist(s)
2021	23	10	1st place, gold medalist(s)
2022	24	6	3rd place, bronze medalist(s)
2023	25	5	1st place, gold medalist(s)
2025	27	18	6
