= India Sherret =

Canadian freestyle skier

Personal information
- Born: 29 May 1996 (age 30) Cranbrook, British Columbia, Canada

Sport
- Country: Canada
- Sport: Freestyle skiing
- Event: Ski cross
Medal record
Women's freestyle skiing
Representing Canada
Junior World Championships
Gold medal – first place	2015 Valmalenco, Italy	Ski Cross

India Sherret (born 29 May 1996) is a Canadian freestyle skier who competes internationally in ski cross.

Sherret began skiing as part of the Kimberley alpine team, but switched to the ski cross discipline at age 14. In 2015, she won the FIS Freestyle Junior World Ski Championships in women's ski cross. She sat out the following season due to the need to recovery from bulimia nervosa, a condition Sherret began to suffer from at age 15. On January 13, 2018, she won the bronze medal at a FIS World Cup event in Idre, Sweden, her first podium finish at a senior World Cup event.

She represented Canada at the 2018 Winter Olympics as part of the women's ski cross team. Sherret placed eleventh in the qualifying run for the women's ski cross event. In her heat, Sherret lost control going into a jump and crashed into the next hill. She was hospitalized for small transverse process fractures to her back, requiring her to wear a brace for several weeks. Sherret subsequently expressed optimism about competing in the 2022 Winter Olympics.

In 2025, she was the top Canadian with a fifth-place finish overall at the World Cup in Craigleth.
