= Hanna Faulhaber =

American freestyle skier

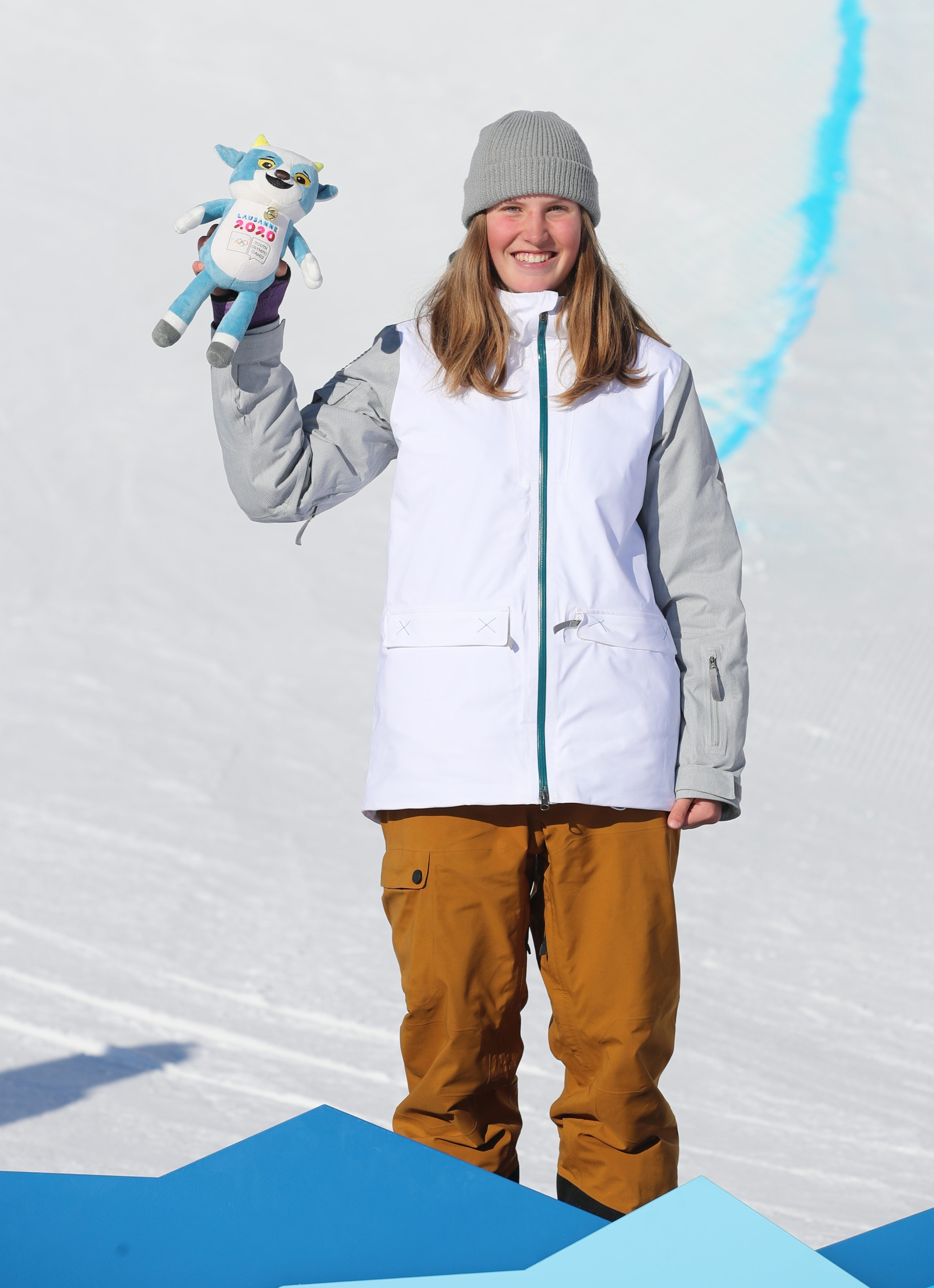
- Faulhaber in 2020

Personal information
- Born: September 4, 2004 (age 21) Aspen, Colorado, U.S.
- Home town: Basalt, Colorado, U.S.

Sport
- Country: United States
- Sport: Freestyle skiing
- Event: Halfpipe
- Club: Aspen Valley ski and snowboard club
Medal record
Women's freestyle skiing
Representing the United States
World Championships
| Gold medal – first place | 2023 Bakuriani | Halfpipe |
Winter X Games
| Bronze medal – third place | 2022 Aspen | SuperPipe |
Winter Youth Olympics
| Bronze medal – third place | 2020 Lausanne | Halfpipe |

Hanna Faulhaber (born September 4, 2004) is an American freestyle skier who competes internationally.

== Career ==
She competed in the FIS Freestyle Ski and Snowboarding World Championships 2021, where she placed fourth in women's ski halfpipe.

Hanna is a 2019 National Champion. She competed on the 2020 United States Youth Olympic Team, earning a bronze medal. In 2022, she competed in her first Olympic Games, placing 6th in Freeski Halfpipe.

== Personal ==
Faulhaber has been skiing since she was three years old. She joined Aspen Valley Ski and Snowboard Club when she was four and kept progressing program by program.

She has been traveling the world as a professional halfpipe skier. She used to watch X Games in her hometown and got inspired to ski the Halfpipe.
