= Saori Suzuki =

Japanese freestyle skier (born 1990)

Personal information
- Born: 9 January 1990 (age 36)
- Height: 1.60 m (5 ft 3 in)

Sport
- Country: Japan
- Sport: Freestyle skiing
- Event: Halfpipe

Saori Suzuki (鈴木 沙織, Suzuki Saori; born 9 January 1990) is a Japanese freestyle skier. She competed in the 2018 Winter Olympics in the women's halfpipe.
