= Valeriya Demidova =

Russian freestyle skier

Personal information
- Full name: Valeriya Vladimirovna Demidova
- Born: 3 March 2000 (age 26)
- Height: 1.63 m (5 ft 4 in)

Sport
- Sport: Skiing

World Cup career
- Indiv. podiums: 5
- Indiv. wins: 1
- Discipline titles: 1

Valeriya Vladimirovna Demidova (Russian: Валерия Владимировна Демидова; born 3 March 2000) is a Russian freestyle skier. She competed in the 2018 Winter Olympics in the women's halfpipe.

== World Cup podiums ==
=== Individual podiums ===
- 1 wins
- 5 podiums

Season	Date	Location	Place
2017–18	22 December 2017	Beijing/Secret Garden, China	3rd
2019–20	7 September 2019	(Australia) Cardrona, New Zealand	3rd
2019–20	20 December 2019	Secret Garden, China	1st
2019–20	1 February 2020	Mammoth, United States	2nd
2019–20	14 February 2020	Calgary, Canada	3rd

=== Season titles ===
- 1 title

Season	Discipline
2020	Halfpipe
