= Elena Gaskell =

Canadian freestyle skier (born 2001)

Personal information
- Born: 17 September 2001 (age 24) Vernon, British Columbia, Canada

Sport
- Country: Canada
- Sport: Freestyle skiing
- Events: Slopestyle, Big air

Elena Gaskell (born 17 September 2001) is a Canadian freestyle skier who competes internationally in the big air and slopestyle disciplines.

== Career ==
Gaskell joined the national team in 2016. At the first World Cup of the 2021-22 season, Gaskell took bronze in the big air event.

On January 24, 2022, Gaskell was named to Canada's 2022 Olympic team in the big air and slopestyle events. Gaskell did not compete however, as she sustained an injury in training at the games.

== Results ==
=== Olympic Winter Games ===
Year	Age	Slopestyle	Big Air
(China) 2022 Beijing	20	–	DNS
(Italy) 2026 Milano Cortina	24	23	20

=== World Championships ===
Year	Age	Slopestyle	Big Air
(United States) 2019 Park City Mountain Resort	17	—N/a	15
