= Sun Jiaxu =

Chinese freestyle skier (born 1999)

Personal information
- Nationality: Chinese
- Born: 1 June 1999 (age 27) Jilin, China

Sport
- Country: China
- Sport: Freestyle skiing
- Event: Aerials
- Club: Changchun
Medal record
Men's freestyle skiing
Representing China
World Championships
Silver medal – second place	2019 Utah	Mixed team aerials

Sun Jiaxu
- Traditional Chinese: 孫佳旭
- Simplified Chinese: 孙佳旭
Transcriptions
Standard Mandarin
- Hanyu Pinyin: Sūn Jiāxù

Sun Jiaxu (Chinese: 孙佳旭, born 1 June 1999) is a Chinese freestyle skier.

== Career ==
He participated at the FIS Freestyle Ski and Snowboarding World Championships 2019, winning a medal.

He competed for China at the 2022 and 2026 Winter Olympics.
