= Sabrina Cakmakli =

German freestyle skier (born 1994)

Personal information
- Born: 25 November 1994 (age 31) Immenstadt im Allgäu, Germany

Sport
- Sport: Skiing

World Cup career
- Indiv. podiums: 1

Sabrina Cakmakli (born November 25, 1994, in Immenstadt im Allgäu) is a German freestyle skier, specializing in halfpipe and slopestyle. She represented Germany at four Winter Olympics (2014, 2018, 2022, 2026).

== Career ==
Cakmakli competed at the 2014 Winter Olympics for Germany. She placed 14th in the qualifying round in the halfpipe, failing to advance.

As of September 2015, her best showing at the World Championships is 5th, in the 2015 halfpipe.

Cakmakli made her World Cup debut in August 2013. As of September 2015, she has one World Cup podium finish, a silver in a halfpipe event at Park City in 2014–15. Her best World Cup overall finish in a discipline is 5th, in the 2014–15 halfpipe.

== Personal life ==
Born in Germany, Cakmakli is of Turkish descent.

== World Cup podiums ==
Date	Location	Rank	Event
28 February 2015	Park City	2nd place, silver medalist(s)	Halfpipe
