= Freestyle skiing at the 2026 Winter Olympics – Men's slopestyle =

Men's slopestyle at the XXV Olympic Winter Games
- Freestyle skiing
- Venue: Livigno Snow Park, Valtellina
- Date: 7, 10 February 2026

Medalists
1st place, gold medalist(s)		Birk Ruud	Norway
2nd place, silver medalist(s)		Alex Hall	United States
3rd place, bronze medalist(s)		Luca Harrington	New Zealand

The men's slopestyle competition in freestyle skiing at the 2026 Winter Olympics was held on 7 February (qualification) and 10 February (final), at the Livigno Snow Park in Valtellina. Birk Ruud of Norway, the 2022 Olympic champion in big air, won the event. The defending champion Alex Hall of the United States won the silver medal. Luca Harrington of New Zealand won bronze, which became the first Olympic medal for him.

== Background ==
The 2022 champion, Alex Hall, qualified for the event, as did the bronze medalist, Jesper Tjäder. The silver medalist, Nick Goepper, moved to halfpipe. There were only two events in 2025–26 FIS Freestyle Ski World Cup in slopestyle before the Olympics; they were won by Mac Forehand and Birk Ruud. Ruud was also the 2025 World champion.

== Results ==
=== Qualification ===
Q — Qualified for the Final

The top 12 athletes in the qualifiers move on to the medal round.

Qualification results
Rank	Bib	Order	Name	Country	Run 1	Run 2	Best	Notes
1	1	1	Birk Ruud	Norway	81.75	37.05	81.75	Q
2	7	10	Tormod Frostad	Norway	79.96	72.80	79.96	Q
3	12	16	Jesper Tjäder	Sweden	36.43	79.83	79.83	Q
4	5	4	Matěj Švancer	Austria	64.13	79.63	79.63	Q
5	4	5	Mac Forehand	United States	44.68	73.96	73.96	Q
6	3	2	Andri Ragettli	Switzerland	75.00	20.95	75.00	Q
7	8	3	Ben Barclay	New Zealand	73.36	65.70	73.36	Q
8	2	9	Alex Hall	United States	71.63	68.98	71.63	Q
9	6	7	Luca Harrington	New Zealand	69.70	22.95	69.70	Q
10	11	15	Konnor Ralph	United States	68.91	50.15	68.91	Q
11	9	6	Sebastian Schjerve	Norway	22.88	67.63	67.63	Q
12	17	18	Kim Gubser	Switzerland	64.10	56.80	64.10	Q
13	21	27	Elias Syrjä	Finland	64.03	61.91	64.03	
14	23	22	Kuura Koivisto	Finland	22.08	63.93	63.93	
15	28	26	Matias Roche	France	54.50	57.96	57.96	
16	10	8	Evan McEachran	Canada	57.85	34.38	57.85	
17	19	14	Miro Tabanelli	Italy	35.36	51.93	51.93	
18	24	25	Elias Lajunen	Finland	25.70	48.88	48.88	
19	29	24	Martin Nordqvist	Sweden	46.00	35.71	46.00	
20	25	29	Lucas Ball	New Zealand	44.91	24.86	44.91	
21	13	20	Henry Sildaru	Estonia	43.05	21.70	43.05	
22	15	19	Fabian Bösch	Switzerland	21.83	40.28	40.28	
23	22	28	Timothe Sivignon	France	38.93	31.95	38.93	
24	14	12	Ulrik Samnøy	Norway	36.05	21.78	36.05	
25	18	17	Nils Rhyner	Switzerland	20.58	35.81	35.81	
26	20	13	Chris McCormick	Great Britain	33.90	33.21	33.90	
27	26	23	Julius Forer	Austria	16.20	32.55	32.55	
28	16	11	Troy Podmilsak	United States	30.90	29.81	30.90	
	27	21	Henrik Harlaut	Sweden	DNS			

=== Final ===
Final results
Rank	Bib	Order	Name	Country	Run 1	Run 2	Run 3	Best
1st place, gold medalist(s)	1	12	Birk Ruud	Norway	86.28	45.08	8.16	86.28
2nd place, silver medalist(s)	2	5	Alex Hall	United States	52.65	85.75	8.03	85.75
3rd place, bronze medalist(s)	6	4	Luca Harrington	New Zealand	27.55	35.51	85.15	85.15
4	3	8	Andri Ragettli	Switzerland	78.65	19.80	21.03	78.65
5	12	10	Jesper Tjäder	Sweden	77.21	11.58	1.91	77.21
6	9	2	Sebastian Schjerve	Norway	28.50	1.38	76.20	76.20
7	5	9	Matěj Švancer	Austria	30.56	1.76	73.71	73.71
8	8	6	Ben Barclay	New Zealand	69.40	17.73	17.56	69.40
9	11	3	Konnor Ralph	United States	36.20	66.76	35.90	66.76
10	17	1	Kim Gubser	Switzerland	22.21	16.61	57.68	57.68
11	4	7	Mac Forehand	United States	1.25	55.93	15.61	55.93
12	7	11	Tormod Frostad	Norway	33.38	42.51	29.10	42.51
