= FIS Freestyle Ski and Snowboarding World Championships 2025 – Men's ski slopestyle =

Men's ski slopestyle at the FIS Freestyle Ski and Snowboarding World Championships 2025
- Location: Corvatsch, Switzerland
- Dates: 19 March (qualification); 21 March (final)
- Competitors: 49 from 21 nations
- Winning points: 89.10

Medalists
| gold medal | Birk Ruud | Norway |
| silver medal | Mac Forehand | United States |
| bronze medal | Alex Hall | United States |

The Men's ski slopestyle competition at the FIS Freestyle Ski and Snowboarding World Championships 2025 was held on 19 and 21 March 2025.

== Qualification ==
The qualification was started on 19 March at 11:30. The eight best skiers from each heat qualified for the final.

=== Heat 1 ===
| Rank | Bib | Start order | Name | Country | Run 1 | Run 2 | Best | Notes |
|---|---|---|---|---|---|---|---|---|
| 1 | 4 | 3 | Andri Ragettli | Switzerland | 81.08 | 84.68 | 84.68 | Q |
| 2 | 5 | 7 | Luca Harrington | New Zealand | 79.59 | 81.72 | 81.72 | Q |
| 3 | 1 | 4 | Mac Forehand | United States | 79.36 | 51.55 | 79.36 | Q |
| 4 | 12 | 1 | Sebastian Schjerve | Norway | 76.21 | 79.15 | 79.15 | Q |
| 5 | 16 | 2 | Henry Sildaru | Estonia | 57.73 | 77.25 | 77.25 | Q |
| 6 | 18 | 10 | Miro Tabanelli | Italy | 75.82 | 60.95 | 75.82 | Q |
| 7 | 8 | 9 | Tormod Frostad | Norway | 32.74 | 72.57 | 72.57 | Q |
| 8 | 13 | 8 | Hunter Henderson | United States | 58.85 | 68.58 | 68.58 | Q |
| 9 | 26 | 15 | Chris McCormick | Great Britain | 35.16 | 63.42 | 63.42 | |
| 10 | 34 | 19 | Julius Forer | Austria | 60.52 | 62.51 | 62.51 | |
| 11 | 21 | 5 | Noah Porter MacLennan | Canada | 61.81 | 18.60 | 61.81 | |
| 12 | 30 | 17 | Kuura Koivisto | Finland | 48.22 | 59.33 | 59.33 | |
| 13 | 46 | 23 | Renè Monteleone | Italy | 49.81 | 57.37 | 57.37 | |
| 14 | 25 | 12 | Javier Lliso | Spain | 52.44 | 57.24 | 57.24 | |
| 15 | 33 | 20 | Lucas Ball | New Zealand | 34.78 | 56.57 | 56.57 | |
| 16 | 38 | 13 | Elias Lajunen | Finland | 50.96 | 54.32 | 54.32 | |
| 17 | 51 | 24 | Victor Knutsen | Sweden | 10.21 | 52.07 | 52.07 | |
| 18 | 37 | 11 | Simo Peltola | Finland | 51.31 | 48.74 | 51.31 | |
| 19 | 41 | 16 | Francisco Salas | Chile | 51.09 | 43.95 | 51.09 | |
| 20 | 54 | 25 | Joey Elliss | Australia | 44.49 | 41.49 | 44.49 | |
| 21 | 50 | 21 | Orest Kovalenko | Ukraine | 44.47 | 12.16 | 44.47 | |
| 22 | 47 | 26 | Luka Kuharić | Croatia | 41.22 | 20.97 | 41.22 | |
| 23 | 29 | 14 | Thibault Magnin | Spain | 4.33 | 29.27 | 29.27 | |
| 24 | 22 | 18 | Jérémy Gagné | Canada | 28.75 | 22.28 | 28.75 | |
| 25 | 42 | 22 | Lin Hao | China | 24.90 | 10.18 | 24.90 | |
| | 9 | 6 | Konnor Ralph | United States | Did not start | | | |

=== Heat 2 ===
| Rank | Bib | Start order | Name | Country | Run 1 | Run 2 | Best | Notes |
|---|---|---|---|---|---|---|---|---|
| 1 | 2 | 8 | Alex Hall | United States | 76.43 | 81.97 | 81.97 | Q |
| 2 | 3 | 7 | Birk Ruud | Norway | 45.28 | 80.90 | 80.90 | Q |
| 3 | 14 | 1 | Fabian Bösch | Switzerland | 30.27 | 79.22 | 79.22 | Q |
| 4 | 6 | 4 | Evan McEachran | Canada | 65.57 | 76.77 | 76.77 | Q |
| 5 | 15 | 9 | Troy Podmilsak | United States | 72.68 | 69.92 | 72.68 | Q |
| 6 | 11 | 3 | Ben Barclay | New Zealand | 53.95 | 67.34 | 67.34 | Q |
| 7 | 27 | 17 | Elias Syrjä | Finland | 66.32 | 53.21 | 66.32 | Q |
| 8 | 28 | 14 | Axel Burmansson | Sweden | 51.41 | 64.65 | 64.65 | Q |
| 9 | 35 | 18 | Timothé Sivignon | France | 28.80 | 63.11 | 63.11 | |
| 10 | 23 | 20 | Ulrik Samnøy | Norway | 61.92 | 15.10 | 61.92 | |
| 11 | 32 | 19 | Noah Viande | France | 61.65 | 26.84 | 61.65 | |
| 12 | 39 | 12 | Matias Roche | France | 23.81 | 60.04 | 60.04 | |
| 13 | 19 | 6 | Kim Gubser | Switzerland | 58.19 | 52.59 | 58.19 | |
| 14 | 7 | 5 | Max Moffatt | Canada | 56.43 | 34.06 | 56.43 | |
| 15 | 43 | 25 | Martin Nordqvist | Sweden | 54.44 | 13.35 | 54.44 | |
| 16 | 52 | 23 | Vincent Veile | Germany | 38.54 | 53.00 | 53.00 | |
| 17 | 49 | 24 | Petr Müller | Czech Republic | 50.20 | 52.19 | 52.19 | |
| 18 | 40 | 13 | Fergus McArthur | New Zealand | 1.28 | 51.43 | 51.43 | |
| 19 | 20 | 2 | Colin Wili | Switzerland | 42.22 | 51.14 | 51.14 | |
| 20 | 36 | 16 | Thomas Greenway | Great Britain | 20.16 | 47.07 | 47.07 | |
| 21 | 53 | 26 | Štěpán Hudeček | Czech Republic | 43.70 | 23.23 | 43.70 | |
| 22 | 48 | 21 | Cristobal Colombo | Argentina | 38.47 | 26.32 | 38.47 | |
| 23 | 45 | 22 | Andreas Herranz | France | 33.35 | 24.58 | 33.35 | |
| 24 | 31 | 15 | James Pouch | Great Britain | 26.00 | 24.68 | 26.00 | |
| | 10 | 10 | Lukas Müllauer | Austria | Did not start | | | |
| | 24 | 11 | Leo Landrø | Norway | Did not start | | | |

== Final ==
The final was started on 21 March at 12:15.

| Rank | Bib | Start order | Name | Country | Run 1 | Run 2 | Best |
|---|---|---|---|---|---|---|---|
| 1st place, gold medalist(s) | 3 | 13 | Birk Ruud | Norway | 82.56 | 89.10 | 89.10 |
| 2nd place, silver medalist(s) | 1 | 12 | Mac Forehand | United States | 45.47 | 85.53 | 85.53 |
| 3rd place, bronze medalist(s) | 2 | 15 | Alex Hall | United States | 25.96 | 84.72 | 84.72 |
| 4 | 4 | 16 | Andri Ragettli | Switzerland | 83.79 | 28.45 | 83.79 |
| 5 | 8 | 5 | Tormod Frostad | Norway | 72.76 | 83.60 | 83.60 |
| 6 | 5 | 14 | Luca Harrington | New Zealand | 46.42 | 82.31 | 82.31 |
| 7 | 15 | 6 | Troy Podmilsak | United States | 76.78 | 80.09 | 80.09 |
| 8 | 13 | 4 | Hunter Henderson | United States | 0.97 | 79.74 | 79.74 |
| 9 | 14 | 11 | Fabian Bösch | Switzerland | 78.54 | 72.62 | 78.54 |
| 10 | 12 | 10 | Sebastian Schjerve | Norway | 77.76 | 72.55 | 77.76 |
| 11 | 16 | 9 | Henry Sildaru | Estonia | 52.64 | 76.33 | 76.33 |
| 12 | 6 | 8 | Evan McEachran | Canada | 25.18 | 74.57 | 74.57 |
| 13 | 28 | 1 | Axel Burmansson | Sweden | 67.48 | 73.27 | 73.27 |
| 14 | 18 | 7 | Miro Tabanelli | Italy | 51.76 | 49.86 | 51.76 |
| 15 | 27 | 2 | Elias Syrjä | Finland | 48.80 | 34.67 | 48.80 |
| 16 | 11 | 3 | Ben Barclay | New Zealand | 30.70 | 37.71 | 37.71 |
