= Freestyle skiing at the 2026 Winter Olympics – Men's big air =

Men's big air at the XXV Olympic Winter Games
- Freestyle skiing
- Venue: Livigno Snow Park, Valtellina
- Date: 15, 17 February 2026
- Winning time: 195.50

Medalists
| 1st place, gold medalist(s) | | Tormod Frostad | Norway |
| 2nd place, silver medalist(s) | | Mac Forehand | United States |
| 3rd place, bronze medalist(s) | | Matěj Švancer | Austria |

The men's big air competition in freestyle skiing at the 2026 Winter Olympics will be held on 15 February (qualification) and 17 February (final), at the Livigno Snow Park in Valtellina. Tormod Frostad of Norway won the event, Mac Forehand of the United States won the silver medal, and Matěj Švancer of Austria won bronze. All of them became the first-time Olympic medalists.

== Background ==
The defending champion, Birk Ruud, qualified for the event. The 2022 silver medalist, Colby Stevenson, and the bronze medalist, Henrik Harlaut, did not participate. There were only three events in 2025–26 FIS Freestyle Ski World Cup in big air before the Olympics; two were won by Troy Podmilsak and the third one by Ulrik Samnøy. Podmilsak was leading the World Cup standings. Luca Harrington was the 2025 World champion.

== Results ==
=== Qualification ===
Q — Qualified for the Final

The top 12 athletes in the qualifiers advance to the Final.

Qualification results
| Rank | Bib | Order | Name | Country | Run 1 | Run 2 | Run 3 | Total | Notes |
|---|---|---|---|---|---|---|---|---|---|
| 1 | 9 | 5 | Mac Forehand | United States | 93.25 | 89.75 | DNI | 183.00 | Q |
| 2 | 5 | 1 | Matěj Švancer | Austria | 92.50 | 90.00 | DNI | 182.25 | Q |
| 3 | 2 | 9 | Birk Ruud | Norway | 90.75 | 90.25 | DNS | 181.00 | Q |
| 4 | 6 | 6 | Tormod Frostad | Norway | 22.50 | 96.25 | 84.00 | 180.25 | Q |
| 5 | 4 | 8 | Luca Harrington | New Zealand | 84.25 | 92.00 | 87.75 | 179.75 | Q |
| 6 | 22 | 25 | Matias Roche | France | 95.25 | 21.00 | 83.25 | 178.50 | Q |
| 7 | 12 | 18 | Timothé Sivignon | France | 93.00 | 85.00 | DNI | 178.00 | Q |
| 8 | 14 | 11 | Ulrik Samnøy | Norway | 87.00 | 89.00 | DNS | 176.00 | Q |
| 9 | 11 | 16 | Dylan Deschamps | Canada | 85.00 | 84.25 | 90.50 | 175.50 | Q |
| 10 | 1 | 3 | Troy Podmilsak | United States | 89.00 | 85.00 | DNI | 174.00 | Q |
| 11 | 28 | 27 | Martin Nordqvist | Sweden | 90.00 | 80.75 | 83.50 | 173.50 | Q |
| 12 | 17 | 15 | Konnor Ralph | United States | 86.75 | 25.75 | 85.00 | 171.75 | Q |
| 13 | 20 | 17 | Fabian Bösch | Switzerland | 82.00 | 84.75 | 88.00 | 170.00 | |
| 14 | 23 | 22 | Kuura Koivisto | Finland | 78.75 | 88.25 | 80.75 | 169.00 | |
| 15 | 10 | 4 | Elias Syrjä | Finland | 82.25 | 78.75 | 85.75 | 164.50 | |
| 16 | 21 | 28 | Kim Gubser | Switzerland | 83.50 | 79.00 | DNI | 162.50 | |
| 17 | 25 | 23 | Nils Rhyner | Switzerland | 77.00 | 53.50 | 73.25 | 150.25 | |
| 18 | 24 | 26 | Julius Forer | Austria | 83.00 | 61.25 | 42.00 | 144.25 | |
| 19 | 13 | 12 | Ben Barclay | New Zealand | 70.50 | 69.00 | DNI | 139.50 | |
| 20 | 15 | 13 | Sebastian Schjerve | Norway | 32.75 | 49.75 | 81.75 | 131.50 | |
| 21 | 27 | 21 | Chris McCormick | Great Britain | 31.25 | 70.00 | 57.75 | 127.75 | |
| 22 | 19 | 14 | Henry Sildaru | Estonia | 17.00 | 42.00 | 80.00 | 122.00 | |
| 23 | 18 | 20 | Jesper Tjäder | Sweden | 60.75 | 55.75 | DNI | 116.50 | |
| 24 | 26 | 29 | Lucas Ball | New Zealand | 24.75 | 44.25 | 90.00 | 114.75 | |
| 25 | 8 | 7 | Miro Tabanelli | Italy | 91.00 | 21.25 | DNI | 112.25 | |
| 26 | 3 | 10 | Alex Hall | United States | 43.25 | 84.00 | 12.50 | 96.50 | |
| 27 | 7 | 2 | Andri Ragettli | Switzerland | 19.75 | 22.50 | 82.00 | 82.00 | |
| 28 | 16 | 19 | Evan McEachran | Canada | 12.25 | 18.25 | 34.50 | 52.75 | |
| 29 | 29 | 24 | Elias Lajunen | Finland | 9.00 | DNS | DNS | 9.00 | |

=== Final ===
Final results
| Rank | Bib | Order | Name | Country | Run 1 | Run 2 | Run 3 | Total | Notes |
|---|---|---|---|---|---|---|---|---|---|
| 1st place, gold medalist(s) | 6 | 9 | Tormod Frostad | Norway | 95.25 | 97.00 | 98.50 | 195.50 | |
| 2nd place, silver medalist(s) | 9 | 12 | Mac Forehand | United States | 95.00 | 95.00 | 98.25 | 193.25 | |
| 3rd place, bronze medalist(s) | 5 | 11 | Matěj Švancer | Austria | 91.75 | 95.25 | 96.00 | 191.25 | |
| 4 | 1 | 3 | Troy Podmilsak | United States | 90.50 | 73.75 | 94.00 | 184.50 | |
| 5 | 17 | 1 | Konnor Ralph | United States | 86.50 | 16.75 | 91.50 | 178.00 | |
| 6 | 4 | 8 | Luca Harrington | New Zealand | 94.00 | 25.75 | 66.50 | 160.50 | |
| 7 | 11 | 4 | Dylan Deschamps | Canada | 20.75 | 91.00 | 46.50 | 137.50 | |
| 8 | 2 | 10 | Birk Ruud | Norway | 95.00 | 23.25 | DNI | 118.25 | |
| 9 | 14 | 5 | Ulrik Samnøy | Norway | 21.75 | 84.25 | 26.50 | 110.75 | |
| 10 | 22 | 7 | Matias Roche | France | 18.75 | 85.25 | 17.75 | 103.00 | |
| 11 | 12 | 6 | Timothé Sivignon | France | 46.50 | DNI | 33.75 | 80.25 | |
| 12 | 28 | 2 | Martin Nordqvist | Sweden | 16.75 | 19.25 | 38.75 | 58.00 | |
