= FIS Freestyle Ski and Snowboarding World Championships 2025 – Men's ski big air =

Men's ski big air at the FIS Freestyle Ski and Snowboarding World Championships 2025
- Location: St. Moritz, Switzerland
- Dates: 27 March (qualification); 29 March (final)
- Competitors: 50 from 21 nations
- Winning points: 192.00

Medalists
gold medal	Luca Harrington	New Zealand
silver medal	Elias Syrjä	Finland
bronze medal	Birk Ruud	Norway

The Men's ski big air competition at the FIS Freestyle Ski and Snowboarding World Championships 2025 was held on 27 and 29 March 2025.

== Qualification ==
The qualification was started on 27 March at 11:30. The five best skiers from each heat qualified for the final.

=== Heat 1 ===
Rank	Bib	Start order	Name	Country	Run 1	Run 2	Run 3	Total	Notes
1	6	7	Birk Ruud	Norway	91.00	18.50	85.50	176.50	Q
2	12	1	Elias Syrjä	Finland	88.50	56.25	86.50	175.00	Q
3	35	13	Matias Roche	France	90.50	77.25	83.25	173.75	Q
4	4	2	Alex Hall	United States	86.25	87.25	DNI	173.50	Q
5	8	5	Timothé Sivignon	France	88.25	84.75	DNI	173.00	Q
6	17	3	Sebastian Schjerve	Norway	87.00	83.25	84.50	171.50	
7	9	10	Evan McEachran	Canada	83.25	85.00	DNI	168.25	
8	13	9	Leo Landrø	Norway	80.75	86.75	DNI	167.50	
9	33	19	Vincent Veile	Germany	79.75	87.25	DNI	167.00	
10	25	17	Colin Wili	Switzerland	80.00	86.00	DNI	166.00	
11	38	11	Lucas Ball	New Zealand	78.00	87.00	DNI	165.00	
12	23	20	Kim Gubser	Switzerland	82.00	81.00	DNI	163.00	
13	42	26	Martin Nordqvist	Sweden	77.75	65.50	76.25	154.00	
14	19	6	Hunter Henderson	United States	72.00	16.00	81.25	153.25	
15	46	23	Petr Müller	Czech Republic	57.50	71.25	73.75	131.25	
16	41	12	Simo Peltola	Finland	16.00	78.25	45.75	124.00	
17	5	4	Tormod Frostad	Norway	18.75	87.50	33.50	121.00	
18	29	15	Axel Burmansson	Sweden	49.75	54.00	64.00	118.00	
19	32	14	Hannes Rudigier	Austria	57.25	68.50	48.75	117.25	
20	50	21	Fergus McArthur	New Zealand	62.00	43.25	44.00	106.00	
21	37	16	Noah Viande	France	45.25	DNI	52.50	97.75	
22	51	22	Lin Hao	China	10.75	40.50	54.50	95.00	
23	45	25	Joey Elliss	Australia	19.00	52.00	16.00	68.00	
24	28	18	Andreas Herranz	France	18.00	39.25	DNI	39.25	
	14	8	Lukas Müllauer	Austria	Did not start				
	54	24	Santiago Magni	Argentina	Did not start				

=== Heat 2 ===
Rank	Bib	Start order	Name	Country	Run 1	Run 2	Run 3	Total	Notes
1	3	9	Luca Harrington	New Zealand	93.50	89.50	DNI	183.00	Q
2	2	4	Mac Forehand	United States	90.25	89.00	91.00	180.00	Q
3	15	2	Troy Podmilsak	United States	92.00	85.50	DNI	177.50	Q
4	7	6	Andri Ragettli	Switzerland	86.50	87.50	89.00	176.50	Q
5	16	10	Ben Barclay	New Zealand	90.50	80.25	85.25	175.75	Q
6	20	1	Fabian Bösch	Switzerland	87.00	87.50	DNI	174.50	
7	10	8	Miro Tabanelli	Italy	79.75	56.50	93.75	173.50	
8	18	5	Ulrik Samnøy	Norway	85.25	86.00	DNI	171.25	
9	49	25	Orest Kovalenko	Ukraine	66.50	84.50	80.75	165.25	
10	30	20	Javier Lliso	Spain	75.25	89.25	DNI	164.50	
11	22	11	Kuura Koivisto	Finland	80.00	46.75	80.50	160.50	
12	27	16	Jérémy Gagné	Canada	10.50	77.00	81.50	158.50	
13	24	18	Julius Forer	Austria	74.50	83.75	DNI	158.25	
14	31	17	Chris McCormick	Great Britain	81.50	70.75	74.00	155.50	
15	53	26	Victor Knutsen	Sweden	13.00	71.00	80.75	151.75	
16	47	23	Thomas Greenway	Great Britain	70.00	14.25	79.00	149.00	
17	36	19	James Pouch	Great Britain	78.25	49.50	60.50	138.75	
18	48	21	Elias Lajunen	Finland	60.75	75.25	DNI	136.00	
19	39	13	Cristobal Colombo	Argentina	67.50	DNI	66.50	134.00	
20	34	12	Thibault Magnin	Spain	11.25	64.75	57.75	122.50	
21	44	24	Štěpán Hudeček	Czech Republic	16.50	66.00	52.00	118.00	
22	11	7	Max Moffatt	Canada	19.25	52.50	56.25	108.75	
23	21	3	Henry Sildaru	Estonia	14.00	32.50	69.75	102.25	
24	40	15	Francisco Salas	Chile	63.75	30.50	35.50	99.25	
25	26	14	Noah Porter MacLennan	Canada	32.50	76.00	15.00	91.00	
26	52	22	Luka Kuharić	Croatia	44.00	33.50	43.00	87.00	

== Final ==
The final was started on 29 March at 19:30.

Rank	Bib	Start order	Name	Country	Run 1	Run 2	Run 3	Total
1st place, gold medalist(s)	3	10	Luca Harrington	New Zealand	92.00	96.75	95.25	192.00
2nd place, silver medalist(s)	12	4	Elias Syrjä	Finland	91.75	89.50	92.50	184.25
3rd place, bronze medalist(s)	6	7	Birk Ruud	Norway	87.00	93.50	89.50	183.00
4	2	9	Mac Forehand	United States	94.00	88.00	DNI	182.00
5	15	8	Troy Podmilsak	United States	93.25	24.00	84.00	177.25
6	4	2	Alex Hall	United States	91.25	83.00	DNI	174.25
7	16	5	Ben Barclay	New Zealand	15.25	83.25	73.75	157.00
8	35	3	Matias Roche	France	92.50	14.25	18.25	110.75
9	8	1	Timothé Sivignon	France	21.50	DNI	73.00	94.50
10	7	6	Andri Ragettli	Switzerland	16.50	19.50	10.00	29.50
