= FIS Freestyle Ski and Snowboarding World Championships 2023 – Men's ski big air =

Men's ski big air at the FIS Freestyle Ski and Snowboarding World Championships 2023
- Location: Bakuriani, Georgia
- Dates: 3 March (qualification); 4 March
- Competitors: 44 from 19 nations
- Winning points: 187.75

Medalists
gold medal	Troy Podmilsak	United States
silver medal	Lukas Müllauer	Austria
bronze medal	Birk Ruud	Norway

The Men's ski big air competition at the FIS Freestyle Ski and Snowboarding World Championships 2023 was held on 3 and 4 March 2023.

== Qualification ==
The qualification was started on 3 March at 12:15. The five best skiers from each heat qualified for the final.

=== Heat 1 ===
Rank	Bib	Start order	Name	Country	Run 1	Run 2	Best	Notes
1	9	9	Noah Porter MacLennan	Canada	89.80	96.40	96.40	Q
2	16	6	Teal Harle	Canada	15.40	94.80	94.80	Q
3	17	7	Christian Nummedal	Norway	87.00	94.00	94.00	Q
4	8	4	Sebastian Schjerve	Norway	22.00	92.60	92.60	Q
5	1	3	Birk Ruud	Norway	90.80	38.40	90.80	Q
6	5	8	Oliwer Magnusson	Sweden	88.80	21.40	88.80	
7	13	1	Fabian Bösch	Switzerland	83.20	86.40	86.40	
8	37	25	Gen Fuji	Japan	85.80	20.20	85.80	
9	36	14	Orest Kovalenko	Ukraine	84.60	25.20	84.60	
10	24	17	Chris McCormick	Great Britain	20.60	83.60	83.60	
11	12	10	Timothé Sivignon	France	79.00	82.40	82.40	
12	32	22	Štěpán Hudeček	Czech Republic	74.80	79.80	79.80	
13	45	19	Rai Kasamura	Japan	75.80	14.40	75.80	
14	33	23	Vincent Veile	Germany	48.60	74.80	74.80	
15	41	11	Kaditane Gomis	France	73.60	11.60	73.60	
16	20	2	Javier Lliso	Spain	69.20	8.80	69.20	
17	44	16	Michael Oravec	Slovakia	60.60	31.20	60.60	
18	4	5	Max Moffatt	Canada	57.40	15.20	57.40	
19	49	18	Nika Eloshvili	Georgia	10.60	56.60	56.60	
20	40	24	Teemu Lauronen	Finland	19.60	51.80	51.80	
21	28	12	Thibault Magnin	Spain	40.00	1.00	40.00	
22	21	21	Cody Laplante	United States	38.00	32.40	38.00	
23	25	15	Oliver Movenius	Sweden	18.20	19.40	19.40	
	29	13	Tyler Harding	Great Britain	Did not start			
	50	20	Luka Chopikashvili	Georgia	Did not start			

=== Heat 2 ===
Rank	Bib	Start order	Name	Country	Run 1	Run 2	Best	Notes
1	11	1	Lukas Müllauer	Austria	13.40	96.40	96.40	Q
2	30	23	Luca Harrington	United States	94.60	88.20	94.60	Q
3	2	10	Matěj Švancer	Austria	92.60	26.20	92.60	Q
4	19	8	Tormod Frostad	Norway	87.80	90.40	90.40	Q
5	7	4	Troy Podmilsak	United States	89.60	89.60	89.60	Q
6	35	14	Kuura Koivisto	Finland	73.80	86.60	86.60	
7	38	24	Rene Monteleone	Italy	84.00	18.00	84.00	
8	34	15	Miro Tabanelli	Italy	35.20	82.60	82.60	
9	42	21	Simo Peltola	Finland	80.00	54.40	80.00	
10	31	22	Alexis Ghisleni	France	48.60	79.60	79.60	
11	18	7	Hugo Burvall	Sweden	40.20	79.20	79.20	
12	10	2	Evan McEachran	Canada	75.00	69.60	75.00	
13	14	9	Elias Syrjä	Finland	71.20	40.40	71.20	
14	22	11	Ben Barclay	New Zealand	22.40	62.80	62.80	
15	6	5	Jesper Tjäder	Sweden	60.00	35.40	60.00	
16	23	16	Colin Wili	Switzerland	56.00	47.40	56.00	
17	15	6	Hunter Henderson	United States	13.60	46.60	46.60	
18	26	18	Valentin Morel	Switzerland	40.80	45.20	45.20	
19	47	19	Jost Klancar	Slovenia	10.00	44.80	44.80	
20	27	20	Kim Gubser	Switzerland	35.40	DNS	35.40	
21	43	17	Moritz Happacher	Italy	17.00	11.40	17.00	
	3	3	Andri Ragettli	Switzerland	Did not start			
	39	12	Axel Burmansson	Sweden	Did not start			
	46	13	Yoon Jong-hyun	South Korea	Did not start			

== Final ==
The final was started on 4 March at 15:15.

Rank	Bib	Start order	Name	Country	Run 1	Run 2	Run 3	Total
1st place, gold medalist(s)	7	1	Troy Podmilsak	United States	91.25	96.50	42.00	187.75
2nd place, silver medalist(s)	11	10	Lukas Müllauer	Austria	89.75	81.25	94.75	184.50
3rd place, bronze medalist(s)	1	2	Birk Ruud	Norway	94.75	88.75	16.00	183.50
4	2	5	Matěj Švancer	Austria	22.50	90.00	86.50	176.50
5	30	7	Luca Harrington	United States	72.00	84.25	91.75	176.00
6	8	4	Sebastian Schjerve	Norway	86.50	73.25	88.50	175.00
7	17	6	Christian Nummedal	Norway	84.75	90.50	81.00	171.50
8	9	9	Noah Porter MacLennan	Canada	92.75	31.00	20.50	123.75
9	19	3	Tormod Frostad	Norway	70.00	85.50	22.75	108.25
10	16	8	Teal Harle	Canada	23.75	21.00	11.25	35.00
