= 2025–26 FIS Freestyle Ski World Cup =

Freestyle skiing competitive season

Discipline	Men	Women
Ski Cross	(Canada) Reece Howden (4)	(Sweden) Sandra Näslund (5)
Overall Moguls	(Japan) Ikuma Horishima (1)	(United States) Olivia Giaccio (1)
Moguls	(Japan) Ikuma Horishima (2)	(Australia) Jakara Anthony (3)
Dual Moguls	(Japan) Ikuma Horishima (1)	(United States) Jaelin Kauf (2)
Park & Pipe Overall	(Estonia) Henry Sildaru (1)	(United Kingdom) Kirsty Muir (1)
Halfpipe	(New Zealand) Finley Melville Ives (1)	(United Kingdom) Zoe Atkin (2)
Slopestyle	(Norway) Birk Ruud (2)	(United Kingdom) Kirsty Muir (1)
Big Air	(United States) Troy Podmilsak (1)	(Canada) Naomi Urness (1)
Aerials	(China) Sun Jiaxu (1)	(China) Xu Mengtao (7)
- Nations Cup Overall: Canada (17)

Competition
Edition	54th	54th
Locations	25	25
Individual	42	43
Team	1	1
Cancelled	6	5

The 2025–26 FIS Freestyle Ski World Cup, organized by the International Ski Federation (FIS), was a World Cup in freestyle skiing for men and women.

The season started on 20 November 2025 in Stubai, Austria and concluded on 29 March 2026 in Gällivare, Sweden.

This season included six disciplines: moguls, aerials, ski cross, halfpipe, slopestyle and big air.

== Men ==
=== Calendar ===
==== Ski Cross (SX) ====
No.	Date	Place	Winner	Second	Third	Discipline leader	R.
1	11 December 2025	(France) Val Thorens	(Italy) Simone Deromedis	(Italy) Edoardo Zorzi	(France) Youri Duplessis-Kergomard	(Italy) Simone Deromedis	
2	12 December 2025	(France) Val Thorens	(Canada) Kevin Drury	(Italy) Simone Deromedis	(Austria) Tristan Takats	(Italy) Simone Deromedis	
3	16 December 2025	(Switzerland) Arosa	(Canada) Reece Howden	(Austria) Johannes Aujesky	(Sweden) David Mobärg	(Italy) Simone Deromedis	
4	20 December 2025	(Italy) Innichen	(Canada) Reece Howden	(Switzerland) Alex Fiva	(Switzerland) Tobias Baur	(Canada) Reece Howden	
5	21 December 2025	(Italy) Innichen	(Canada) Reece Howden	(Germany) Florian Wilmsmann	(France) Evan Klufts	(Canada) Reece Howden	
6	23 January 2026	(Switzerland) Veysonnaz	(France) Youri Duplessis-Kergomard	(Canada) Reece Howden	(Switzerland) Tobias Baur	(Canada) Reece Howden	
7	24 January 2026	(Switzerland) Veysonnaz	(Canada) Reece Howden	(Germany) Tim Hronek	(France) Melvin Tchiknavorian	(Canada) Reece Howden	
8	30 January 2026	(Italy) Val di Fassa	(Germany) Florian Wilmsmann	(Germany) Cornel Renn	(Germany) Tim Hronek	(Canada) Reece Howden	
9	31 January 2026	(Italy) Val di Fassa	(Italy) Simone Deromedis	(Germany) Florian Wilmsmann	(Canada) Reece Howden	(Canada) Reece Howden	
10	27 February 2026	(Serbia) Kopaonik	(Germany) Tim Hronek	(Canada) Kevin Drury	(Germany) Florian Wilmsmann	(Canada) Reece Howden	
11	28 February 2026	(Serbia) Kopaonik	(Canada) Reece Howden	(Germany) Florian Wilmsmann	(France) Youri Duplessis-Kergomard	(Canada) Reece Howden	
12	12 March 2026	(Austria) Montafon	(Canada) Reece Howden	(Italy) Simone Deromedis	(Switzerland) Alex Fiva	(Canada) Reece Howden	
13	21 March 2026	(Canada) Craigleith	(France) Youri Duplessis-Kergomard	(Canada) Jared Schmidt	(Sweden) David Mobärg	(Canada) Reece Howden	
14	22 March 2026	(Canada) Craigleith	(Italy) Federico Tomasoni	(Canada) Kaleb Barnum	(Canada) Kristofer Mahler	(Canada) Reece Howden	
15	28 March 2026	(Sweden) Gällivare	(Sweden) David Mobärg	(Canada) Reece Howden	(Germany) Kilian Himmelsbach	(Canada) Reece Howden	
16	29 March 2026	(Sweden) Gällivare	(Italy) Simone Deromedis	(Canada) Reece Howden	(Italy) Edoardo Zorzi	(Canada) Reece Howden	

==== Moguls (MO) ====
No.	Date	Place	Winner	Second	Third	Discipline leader	R.
1	7 December 2025	(Finland) Ruka	(Japan) Ikuma Horishima	(Sweden) Walter Wallberg	(United States) Nick Page	(Japan) Ikuma Horishima	
2	8 December 2025	(Finland) Ruka	(Australia) Matt Graham	(Japan) Ikuma Horishima	(Canada) Julien Viel	(Japan) Ikuma Horishima	
3	9 January 2026	(Canada) Val St. Come	(Canada) Mikaël Kingsbury	(Australia) Matt Graham	(United States) Nick Page	(Australia) Matt Graham	
4	16 January 2026	(United States) Waterville Valley	(Japan) Ikuma Horishima	(Sweden) Filip Gravenfors	(Japan) Shota Hirayama	(Japan) Ikuma Horishima	
5	28 February 2026	(Japan) Nanto-Toyama	(Australia) Matt Graham	(United States) Landon Wendler	(Japan) Ikuma Horishima	(Japan) Ikuma Horishima	
	7 March 2026	(Kazakhstan) Almaty	Cancelled				
	14 March 2026	(Azerbaijan) Shahdag	Cancelled				

==== Dual Moguls (DM) ====
No.	Date	Place	Winner	Second	Third	Discipline leader	R.
1	10 January 2026	(Canada) Val St. Come	(Canada) Julien Viel	(Japan) Ikuma Horishima	(Sweden) Filip Gravenfors	(Canada) Julien Viel	
	16 January 2026	(United States) Waterville Valley	Cancelled				
2	1 March 2026	(Japan) Nanto-Toyama	(Japan) Ikuma Horishima	(Sweden) Rasmus Stegfeldt	(Japan) Shima Kawaoka	(Japan) Ikuma Horishima	
	8 March 2026	(Kazakhstan) Almaty	Cancelled				
	15 March 2026	(Azerbaijan) Shahdag	Cancelled				

==== Aerials (AE) ====
No.	Date	Place	Winner	Second	Third	Discipline leader	R.
1	6 December 2025	(Finland) Ruka	(Ukraine) Oleksandr Okipniuk	(Switzerland) Pirmin Werner	(United States) Christopher Lillis	(Ukraine) Oleksandr Okipniuk	
2	20 December 2025	(China) Secret Garden	(China) Li Tianma	(China) Qi Guangpu	(Switzerland) Noé Roth	(China) Li Tianma	
3	6 January 2026	(Canada) Lac-Beauport	(Ukraine) Dmytro Kotovskyi	(China) Sun Jiaxu	(United States) Quinn Dehlinger	(Ukraine) Dmytro Kotovskyi	
4	7 January 2026	(Canada) Lac-Beauport	(China) Sun Jiaxu	(China) Li Tianma	(Switzerland) Noé Roth	(China) Li Tianma	
5	11 January 2026	(United States) Lake Placid	(China) Wang Xindi	(Ukraine) Yan Havriuk	(China) Qi Guangpu	(China) Sun Jiaxu	
6	12 January 2026	(United States) Lake Placid	(China) Li Xinpeng	(China) Wang Xindi	(Canada) Miha Fontaine	(China) Sun Jiaxu	

==== Halfpipe (HP) ====
No.	Date	Place	Winner	Second	Third	Discipline leader	R.
1	12 December 2025	(China) Secret Garden	(New Zealand) Finley Melville Ives	(New Zealand) Luke Harrold	(United States) Hunter Hess	(New Zealand) Finley Melville Ives	
2	20 December 2025	(United States) Copper	(United States) Alex Ferreira	(United States) Hunter Hess	(Canada) Andrew Longino	(United States) Hunter Hess	
3	3 January 2026	(Canada) Calgary	(United States) Nick Goepper	(New Zealand) Finley Melville Ives	(United States) Birk Irving	(United States) Hunter Hess	
4	10 January 2026	(United States) Aspen	(New Zealand) Finley Melville Ives	(United States) Hunter Hess	(United States) Nick Goepper	(New Zealand) Finley Melville Ives	
5	29 March 2026	(Switzerland) Silvaplana	(New Zealand) Luke Harrold	(Estonia) Henry Sildaru	(Finland) Jon Sallinen	(New Zealand) Finley Melville Ives	

==== Slopestyle (SS) ====
No.	Date	Place	Winner	Second	Third	Discipline leader	R.
	22 November 2025	(Austria) Stubai	Cancelled				
1	9 January 2026	(United States) Aspen	(United States) Mac Forehand	(Estonia) Henry Sildaru	(Norway) Ulrik Samnøy	(United States) Mac Forehand	
2	17 January 2026	(Switzerland) Laax	(Norway) Birk Ruud	(Austria) Matěj Švancer	(Canada) Evan McEachran	(United States) Mac Forehand (Norway) Birk Ruud	
3	19 March 2026	(France) Tignes	(Italy) Miro Tabanelli	(Norway) Birk Ruud	(Estonia) Henry Sildaru	(Norway) Birk Ruud	
4	28 March 2026	(Switzerland) Silvaplana	(Norway) Birk Ruud	(Estonia) Henry Sildaru	(United States) Mac Forehand	(Norway) Birk Ruud	

==== Big Air (BA) ====
No.	Date	Place	Winner	Second	Third	Discipline leader	R.
1	28 November 2025	(China) Secret Garden	(United States) Troy Podmilsak	(Canada) Dylan Deschamps	(New Zealand) Luca Harrington	(United States) Troy Podmilsak	
2	6 December 2025	(China) Beijing	(Norway) Ulrik Samnøy	(New Zealand) Luca Harrington	(Austria) Matěj Švancer	(New Zealand) Luca Harrington	
3	13 December 2025	(United States) Steamboat	(United States) Troy Podmilsak	(United States) Konnor Ralph	(New Zealand) Luca Harrington	(United States) Troy Podmilsak	
4	20 March 2026	(France) Tignes	(Norway) Tormod Frostad	(Norway) Leo Landrø	(United States) Troy Podmilsak	(United States) Troy Podmilsak	

=== Standings ===
==== Ski Cross ====
Rank	after all 16 events	Points
1	(Canada) Reece Howden	1061
2	(Italy) Simone Deromedis	750
3	(France) Youri Duplessis-Kergomard	599
4	(Germany) Florian Wilmsmann	574
5	(Sweden) David Mobärg	542

==== Overall Moguls (MO/DM) ====
Rank	after all 7 events	Points
1	(Japan) Ikuma Horishima	536
2	(Australia) Matt Graham	408
3	(Canada) Julien Viel	299
4	(United States) Nick Page	277
5	(United States) Charlie Mickel	274

==== Moguls ====
Rank	after all 5 events	Points
1	(Japan) Ikuma Horishima	356
2	(Australia) Matt Graham	345
3	(United States) Nick Page	231
4	(United States) Charlie Mickel	189
5	(Canada) Julien Viel	163

==== Dual Moguls ====
Rank	after all 2 events	Points
1	(Japan) Ikuma Horishima	180
2	(Canada) Julien Viel	136
3	(Sweden) Rasmus Stegfeldt	89
4	(United States) Charlie Mickel	85
5	(Japan) Takuya Shimakawa	76

==== Aerials ====
Rank	after all 6 events	Points
1	(China) Sun Jiaxu	330
2	(China) Li Tianma	296
3	(China) Qi Guangpu	270
4	(Ukraine) Dmytro Kotovskyi	255
5	(China) Wang Xindi	240

==== Park & Pipe Overall (HP/SS/BA) ====
Rank	after all 13 events	Points
1	(Estonia) Henry Sildaru	342
2	(Norway) Birk Ruud	338
3	(United States) Hunter Hess	305
4	(New Zealand) Finley Melville Ives	280
5	(United States) Troy Podmilsak	272

==== Halfpipe ====
Rank	after all 5 events	Points
1	(New Zealand) Finley Melville Ives	280
2	(United States) Hunter Hess	265
3	(United States) Birk Irving	191
4	(New Zealand) Luke Harrold	180
5	(United States) Nick Goepper	175

==== Slopestyle ====
Rank	after all 4 events	Points
1	(Norway) Birk Ruud	280
2	(Estonia) Henry Sildaru	220
3	(United States) Mac Forehand	184
4	(Norway) Sebastian Schjerve	158
5	(Italy) Miro Tabanelli	148

==== Big Air ====
Rank	after all 4 events	Points
1	(United States) Troy Podmilsak	260
2	(New Zealand) Luca Harrington	200
3	(Norway) Tormod Frostad	182
4	(Canada) Dylan Deschamps	161
5	(Norway) Ulrik Samnøy	135

== Women ==
=== Calendar ===
==== Ski Cross (SX) ====
No.	Date	Place	Winner	Second	Third	Discipline leader	R.
1	11 December 2025	(France) Val Thorens	(Sweden) Sandra Näslund	(Canada) Courtney Hoffos	(France) Mylene Ballet Baz	(Sweden) Sandra Näslund	
2	12 December 2025	(France) Val Thorens	(Sweden) Sandra Näslund	(France) Marielle Berger Sabbatel	(Switzerland) Fanny Smith	(Sweden) Sandra Näslund	
3	16 December 2025	(Switzerland) Arosa	(Sweden) Sandra Näslund	(Germany) Daniela Maier	(Switzerland) Fanny Smith	(Sweden) Sandra Näslund	
4	20 December 2025	(Italy) Innichen	(France) Marielle Berger Sabbatel	(Switzerland) Fanny Smith	(Sweden) Sandra Näslund	(Sweden) Sandra Näslund	
5	21 December 2025	(Italy) Innichen	(Sweden) Sandra Näslund	(Germany) Daniela Maier	(Switzerland) Fanny Smith	(Sweden) Sandra Näslund	
6	23 January 2026	(Switzerland) Veysonnaz	(Sweden) Sandra Näslund	(Germany) Daniela Maier	(Austria) Katrin Ofner	(Sweden) Sandra Näslund	
7	24 January 2026	(Switzerland) Veysonnaz	(Germany) Daniela Maier	(Austria) Sonja Gigler	(Canada) Marielle Thompson	(Sweden) Sandra Näslund	
8	30 January 2026	(Italy) Val di Fassa	(Italy) Jole Galli	(France) Marielle Berger Sabbatel	(Canada) Marielle Thompson	(Sweden) Sandra Näslund	
9	31 January 2026	(Italy) Val di Fassa	(Germany) Daniela Maier	(Switzerland) Saskja Lack	(Italy) Jole Galli	(Sweden) Sandra Näslund	
10	27 February 2026	(Serbia) Kopaonik	(Sweden) Sandra Näslund	(France) Jade Grillet-Aubert	(France) Marielle Berger Sabbatel	(Sweden) Sandra Näslund	
11	28 February 2026	(Serbia) Kopaonik	(Sweden) Sandra Näslund	(Germany) Daniela Maier	(Switzerland) Saskja Lack	(Sweden) Sandra Näslund	
12	12 March 2026	(Austria) Montafon	(Sweden) Sandra Näslund	(Germany) Daniela Maier	(Italy) Jole Galli	(Sweden) Sandra Näslund	
13	21 March 2026	(Canada) Craigleith	(Switzerland) Fanny Smith	(Canada) Hannah Schmidt	(Italy) Jole Galli	(Sweden) Sandra Näslund	
14	22 March 2026	(Canada) Craigleith	(Sweden) Sandra Näslund	(France) Marielle Berger Sabbatel	(Switzerland) Fanny Smith	(Sweden) Sandra Näslund	
15	28 March 2026	(Sweden) Gällivare	(Sweden) Sandra Näslund	(Germany) Daniela Maier	(Canada) Hannah Schmidt	(Sweden) Sandra Näslund	
16	29 March 2026	(Sweden) Gällivare	(Sweden) Sandra Näslund	(France) Marielle Berger Sabbatel	(Germany) Daniela Maier	(Sweden) Sandra Näslund	

==== Moguls (MO) ====
No.	Date	Place	Winner	Second	Third	Discipline leader	R.
1	7 December 2025	(Finland) Ruka	(United States) Tess Johnson	(France) Perrine Laffont	(United States) Olivia Giaccio	(United States) Tess Johnson	
2	8 December 2025	(Finland) Ruka	(Australia) Jakara Anthony	(United States) Olivia Giaccio	(United States) Jaelin Kauf	(United States) Tess Johnson	
3	9 January 2026	(Canada) Val St. Come (Note: Results from qualification)	(Australia) Jakara Anthony	(United States) Tess Johnson	(United States) Olivia Giaccio	(Australia) Jakara Anthony	
4	16 January 2026	(United States) Waterville Valley	(Australia) Jakara Anthony	(United States) Elizabeth Lemley	(United States) Olivia Giaccio	(Australia) Jakara Anthony	
5	28 February 2026	(Japan) Nanto-Toyama	(United States) Olivia Giaccio	(Japan) Hinako Tomitaka	(France) Perrine Laffont	(Australia) Jakara Anthony (United States) Olivia Giaccio	
	7 March 2026	(Kazakhstan) Almaty	Cancelled				
	14 March 2026	(Azerbaijan) Shahdag	Cancelled				

==== Dual Moguls (DM) ====
No.	Date	Place	Winner	Second	Third	Discipline leader	R.
1	10 January 2026	(Canada) Val St. Come	(United States) Jaelin Kauf	(United States) Elizabeth Lemley	(United States) Tess Johnson	(United States) Jaelin Kauf	
	16 January 2026	(United States) Waterville Valley	Cancelled				
2	1 March 2026	(Japan) Nanto-Toyama	(United States) Jaelin Kauf	(United States) Olivia Giaccio	(United States) Tess Johnson	(United States) Jaelin Kauf	
	8 March 2026	(Kazakhstan) Almaty	Cancelled				
	15 March 2026	(Azerbaijan) Shahdag	Cancelled				

==== Aerials (AE) ====
No.	Date	Place	Winner	Second	Third	Discipline leader	R.
1	6 December 2025	(Finland) Ruka	(China) Xu Mengtao	(Canada) Marion Thénault	(China) Chen Meiting	(China) Xu Mengtao	
2	20 December 2025	(China) Secret Garden	(China) Kong Fanyu	(China) Chen Meiting	(China) Xu Mengtao	(China) Xu Mengtao	
3	6 January 2026	(Canada) Lac-Beauport	(United States) Winter Vinecki	(Canada) Marion Thénault	(Germany) Emma Weiß	(China) Xu Mengtao	
4	7 January 2026	(Canada) Lac-Beauport	(Australia) Laura Peel	(United States) Winter Vinecki	(China) Xu Mengtao	(China) Xu Mengtao	
5	11 January 2026	(United States) Lake Placid	(Australia) Danielle Scott	(China) Xu Mengtao	(United States) Kaila Kuhn	(China) Xu Mengtao	
6	12 January 2026	(United States) Lake Placid	(United States) Kaila Kuhn	(China) Xu Mengtao	(Australia) Danielle Scott	(China) Xu Mengtao	

==== Halfpipe (HP) ====
No.	Date	Place	Winner	Second	Third	Discipline leader	R.
1	12 December 2025	(China) Secret Garden	(China) Eileen Gu	(United Kingdom) Zoe Atkin	(Australia) Indra Brown	(China) Eileen Gu	
2	20 December 2025	(United States) Copper	(United Kingdom) Zoe Atkin	(Australia) Indra Brown	(China) Zhang Kexin	(United Kingdom) Zoe Atkin	
3	3 January 2026	(Canada) Calgary	(Australia) Indra Brown	(China) Zhang Kexin	(United States) Svea Irving	(Australia) Indra Brown	
4	10 January 2026	(United States) Aspen	(China) Li Fanghui	(United Kingdom) Zoe Atkin	(China) Zhang Kexin	(Australia) Indra Brown	
5	29 March 2026	(Switzerland) Silvaplana	(United Kingdom) Zoe Atkin	(New Zealand) Mischa Thomas	(Individual Neutral Athletes) Aleksandra Glazkova	(United Kingdom) Zoe Atkin	

==== Slopestyle (SS) ====
No.	Date	Place	Winner	Second	Third	Discipline leader	R.
1	22 November 2025	(Austria) Stubai (Note: Results from qualification)	(Switzerland) Mathilde Gremaud	(Canada) Olivia Asselin	(Finland) Anni Kärävä	(Switzerland) Mathilde Gremaud	
2	9 January 2026	(United States) Aspen	(United Kingdom) Kirsty Muir	(Canada) Megan Oldham	(Canada) Elena Gaskell	(Canada) Megan Oldham	
3	17 January 2026	(Switzerland) Laax	(China) Eileen Gu	(United States) Marin Hamill	(Austria) Lara Wolf	(Switzerland) Mathilde Gremaud	
4	19 March 2026	(France) Tignes	(United Kingdom) Kirsty Muir	(Canada) Elena Gaskell	(Austria) Lara Wolf	(United Kingdom) Kirsty Muir	
5	28 March 2026	(Switzerland) Silvaplana	(Switzerland) Sarah Höfflin	(United Kingdom) Kirsty Muir	(Switzerland) Giulia Tanno	(United Kingdom) Kirsty Muir	

==== Big Air (BA) ====
No.	Date	Place	Winner	Second	Third	Discipline leader	R.
1	28 November 2025	(China) Secret Garden	(United Kingdom) Kirsty Muir	(Canada) Naomi Urness	(China) Liu Mengting	(United Kingdom) Kirsty Muir	
2	6 December 2025	(China) Beijing	(Finland) Anni Kärävä	(China) Liu Mengting	(Canada) Naomi Urness	(United Kingdom) Kirsty Muir (Finland) Anni Kärävä	
3	13 December 2025	(United States) Steamboat	(Canada) Naomi Urness	(Ukraine) Kateryna Kotsar	(China) Yang Ruyi	(Canada) Naomi Urness	
4	20 March 2026	(France) Tignes	(Canada) Naomi Urness	(Finland) Anni Kärävä	(Switzerland) Giulia Tanno	(Canada) Naomi Urness	

=== Standings ===
==== Ski Cross ====
Rank	after all 16 events	Points
1	(Sweden) Sandra Näslund	1268
2	(Germany) Daniela Maier	1033
3	(France) Marielle Berger Sabbatel	848
4	(Switzerland) Fanny Smith	671
5	(Italy) Jole Galli	623

==== Overall Moguls (MO/DM) ====
Rank	after all 7 events	Points
1	(United States) Olivia Giaccio	490
2	(Australia) Jakara Anthony	432
3	(United States) Tess Johnson	432
4	(United States) Jaelin Kauf	362
5	(Japan) Hinako Tomitaka	296

==== Moguls ====
Rank	after all 5 events	Points
1	(Australia) Jakara Anthony	360
2	(United States) Olivia Giaccio	360
3	(United States) Tess Johnson	312
4	(Japan) Hinako Tomitaka	225
5	(United States) Kasey Hogg	173

==== Dual Moguls ====
Rank	after all 2 events	Points
1	(United States) Jaelin Kauf	200
2	(United States) Olivia Giaccio	130
3	(United States) Tess Johnson	120
4	(United States) Elizabeth Lemley	80
5	(Canada) Maia Schwinghammer	76

==== Aerials ====
Rank	after all 6 events	Points
1	(China) Xu Mengtao	420
2	(China) Kong Fanyu	293
3	(United States) Kaila Kuhn	279
4	(United States) Winter Vinecki	274
	(Australia) Laura Peel	274

==== Park & Pipe Overall (HP/SS/BA) ====
Rank	after all 14 events	Points
1	(United Kingdom) Kirsty Muir	470
2	(Canada) Naomi Urness	392
3	(Australia) Indra Brown	380
4	(Finland) Anni Kärävä	372
5	(United Kingdom) Zoe Atkin	360

==== Halfpipe ====
Rank	after all 5 events	Points
1	(United Kingdom) Zoe Atkin	360
2	(Australia) Indra Brown	290
3	(China) Zhang Kexin	245
4	(New Zealand) Mischa Thomas	201
5	(China) Li Fanghui	179

==== Slopestyle ====
Rank	after all 5 events	Points
1	(United Kingdom) Kirsty Muir	280
2	(Canada) Elena Gaskell	211
3	(Austria) Lara Wolf	210
4	(United States) Marin Hamill	172
5	(Canada) Megan Oldham	166

==== Big Air ====
Rank	after all 4 events	Points
1	(Canada) Naomi Urness	340
2	(Finland) Anni Kärävä	230
3	(United Kingdom) Kirsty Muir	219
4	(Ukraine) Kateryna Kotsar	167
5	(China) Liu Mengting	160

== Team ==
=== Team Aerials (AET) ===
No.	Date	Place	Winner	Second	Third	R.
1	21 December 2025	(China) Secret Garden	China 1 Xu Mengtao; Li Tianma; Qi Guangpu	China 2 Chen Meiting; Wang Xindi; Sun Jiaxu	United States 2 Kaila Kuhn; Ashton Salwan; Connor Curran	
	12 January 2026	(United States) Lake Placid	Cancelled			

== Nations Cup ==
=== Overall ===
Rank	after all 86 events	Points
1	Canada	6,773
2	United States	5,586
3	Switzerland	4,173
4	France	3,782
5	Germany	3,144
6	Sweden	3,090
7	China	2,882
8	Italy	2,594
9	Australia	2,260
10	Japan	2,222

=== Ski Cross ===
Rank	after all 32 events	Points
1	Switzerland	4,250
2	France	4,101
3	Canada	3,971
4	Germany	3,693
5	Sweden	2,494
6	Italy	2,310
7	Austria	1,686
8	Japan	422
9	United States	279
10	United Kingdom	110

=== Moguls ===
Rank	after all 10 events	Points
1	United States	2,153
2	Japan	1,487
3	Australia	972
4	Canada	878
5	Sweden	377
6	France	363
7	Kazakhstan	302
8	Finland	281
9	Austria	156
10	South Korea	105

=== Dual Moguls ===
Rank	after all 4 events	Points
1	United States	879
2	Japan	749
3	Canada	458
4	Sweden	197
5	Australia	152
6	France	113
7	Kazakhstan	95
8	Finland	87
9	Austria	47
10	Germany	15

=== Park & Pipe (HP/SS/BA) ===
Rank	after all 27 events	Points
1	United States	4,804
2	Canada	2,303
3	New Zealand	1,543
4	Switzerland	1,524
5	Norway	1,496
6	China	1,419
7	United Kingdom	1,115
8	France	614
9	Finland	581
10	Austria	568

== Podium table by nation ==
Table showing the World Cup podium places (gold–1st place, silver–2nd place, bronze–3rd place) by the countries represented by the athletes.

Rank	Nation	Gold	Silver	Bronze	Total
1	Sweden	12	3	4	19
2	Canada	11	15	11	37
3	United States	11	11	18	40
4	China	10	10	8	28
5	Australia	8	2	2	12
6	Italy	6	3	4	13
7	Great Britain	5	3	0	8
8	Germany	4	11	5	20
9	Norway	4	2	1	7
10	France	3	6	7	16
11	Switzerland	3	4	12	19
12	New Zealand	3	4	2	9
13	Japan	3	3	3	9
14	Ukraine	2	2	0	4
15	Finland	1	1	2	4
16	Austria	0	3	5	8
17	Estonia	0	3	1	4
18	Individual Neutral Athletes	0	0	1	1
Totals (18 entries)		86	86	86	258

== Achievements ==
First World Cup career victory

Men

- (United States) Troy Podmilsak (21) – Big Air in Secret Garden
- (Norway) Ulrik Samnøy (23) – Big Air in Beijing
- (Ukraine) Oleksandr Okipniuk (27) – Aerials in Ruka
- (Canada) Julien Viel (24) – Dual Moguls in Val St. Come
- (China) Li Xinpeng (20) – Aerials in Lake Placid
- (Germany) Cornell Renn (27) – Ski Cross in Val di Fassa
- (Italy) Federico Tomasoni (28) – Ski Cross in Craigleith
- (New Zealand) Luke Harrold (17) – Halfpipe in Silvaplana

Women

- (Finland) Anni Kärävä (25) – Big Air in Beijing
- (Canada) Naomi Urness (21) – Big Air in Steamboat
- (Australia) Indra Brown (15) – Halfpipe in Calgary
- (United States) Kaila Kuhn (22) – Aerials in Lake Placid

First World Cup career podium

Men

- (Ukraine) Oleksandr Okipniuk (27) – Aerials in Ruka
- (Italy) Edoardo Zorzi (29) – Ski Cross in Val Thorens
- (France) Evan Klufts (28) – Ski Cross in Innichen
- (Canada) Miha Fontaine (22) – Aerials in Lake Placid
- (Japan) Shota Hirayama (26) – Moguls in Waterville Valley
- (Ukraine) Yan Havriuk (21) – Aerials in Lake Placid
- (Japan) Shima Kawaoka (23) – Dual Moguls in Nanto-Toyama
- (Italy) Federico Tomasoni (28) – Ski Cross in Craigleith
- (Canada) Kaleb Barnum (21) – Ski Cross in Craigleith
- (Germany) Kilian Himmelsbach (23) – Ski Cross in Gällivare

Women

- (Canada) Naomi Urness (21) – Big Air in Secret Garden
- (France) Mylene Ballet Baz (24) – Ski Cross in Val Thorens
- (Australia) Indra Brown (15) – Halfpipe in Secret Garden
- (Ukraine) Kateryna Kotsar (25) – Big Air in Steamboat
- (New Zealand) Mischa Thomas (18) – Halfpipe in Silvaplana
- (Individual Neutral Athletes) Aleksandra Glazkova (20) – Halfpipe in Silvaplana
