= Freestyle skiing at the 2020 Winter Youth Olympics – Boys' slopestyle =

Boys' slopestyle at the III Winter Youth Olympic Games
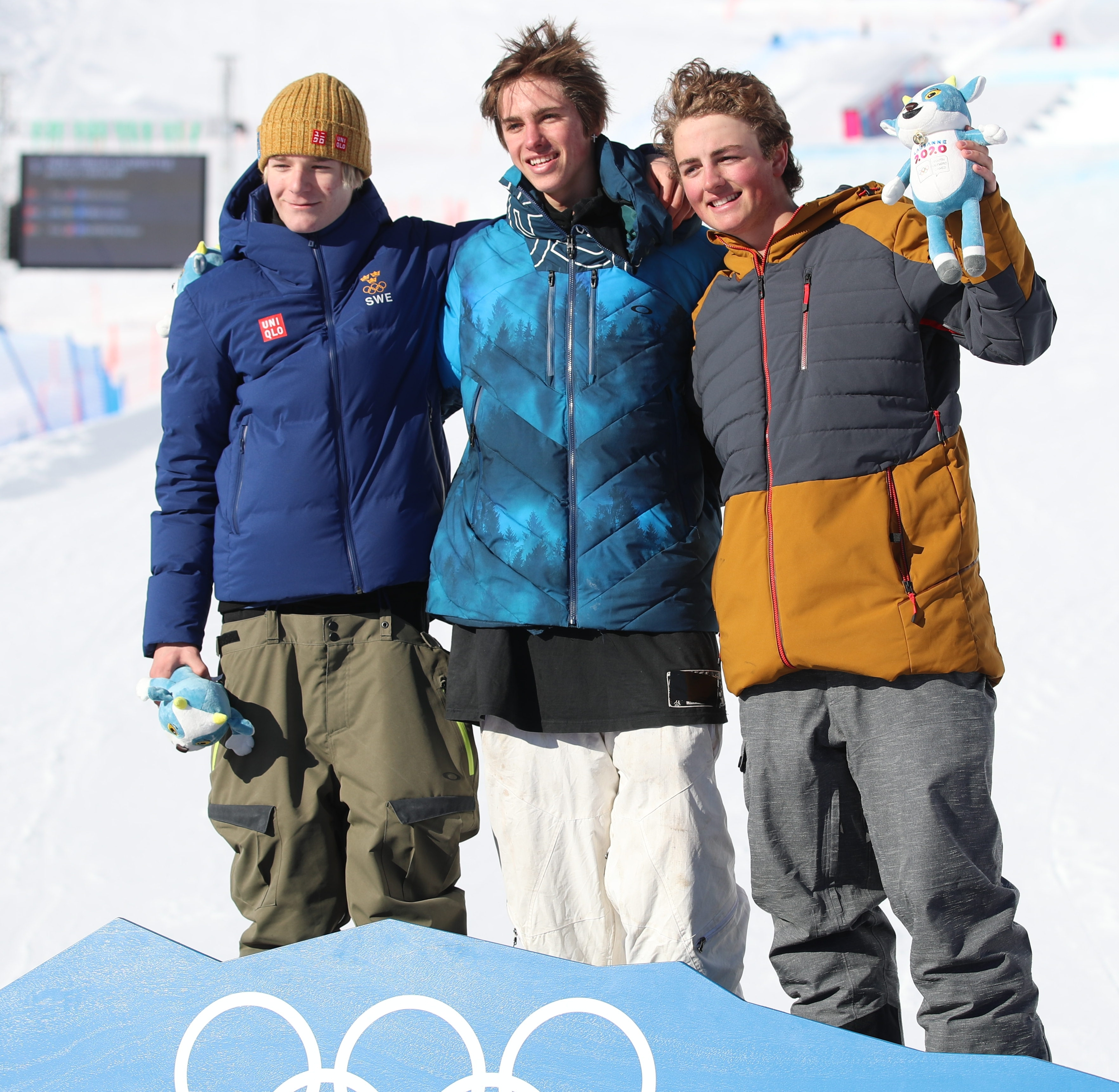
- Venue: Leysin Park & Pipe
- Dates: 20 January
- Competitors: 26 from 15 nations
- Winning points: 90.66

Medalists
1st place, gold medalist(s)		Kiernan Fagan	United States
2nd place, silver medalist(s)		Melvin Morén	Sweden
3rd place, bronze medalist(s)		Hunter Henderson	United States

The boys' slopestyle event in freestyle skiing at the 2020 Winter Youth Olympics took place on 20 January at the Leysin Park & Pipe.

== Qualification ==
The qualification was started at 09:30.

Rank	Bib	Name	Country	Run 1	Run 2	Best	Notes
1	22	Matěj Švancer	Czech Republic	91.00	95.00	95.00	Q
2	2	Melvin Morén	Sweden	87.00	16.66	87.00	Q
3	5	Kiernan Fagan	United States	11.66	83.00	83.00	Q
4	4	Hunter Henderson	United States	80.33	3.66	80.33	Q
5	21	Daniel Bacher	Austria	77.33	34.00	77.33	Q
6	14	Nils Rhyner	Switzerland	73.33	76.00	76.00	Q
7	3	Orest Kovalenko	Ukraine	70.33	71.33	71.33	Q
8	11	Luca Harrington	New Zealand	59.66	68.33	68.33	Q
9	13	Tevje Skaug	Norway	54.66	67.33	67.33	Q
10	10	Fantin Ciompi	Switzerland	66.66	64.33	66.66	Q
11	19	David Zehentner	Germany	64.33	9.66	64.33	Q
12	23	Ruka Ito	Japan	63.33	9.33	63.33	Q
13	25	Max McDonald	New Zealand	63.00	32.33	63.00	
14	8	Martin Nordqvist	Sweden	62.66	15.66	62.66	
15	15	Jasper Klein	Great Britain	61.00	61.66	61.66	
16	6	Ben Barclay	New Zealand	56.66	57.66	57.66	
17	26	Andrew Longino	Canada	55.66	17.66	55.66	
18	7	Jošt Klančar	Slovenia	48.66	9.00	48.66	
19	20	Sampo Yliheikkilä	Finland	45.00	32.66	45.00	
20	1	Tormod Frostad	Norway	39.00	42.66	42.66	
21	24	Štěpán Hudeček	Czech Republic	38.00	10.00	38.00	
22	17	Klemen Vidmar	Slovenia	36.66	24.33	36.66	
23	9	Nicola Bolinger	Switzerland	16.66	31.66	31.66	
24	18	Brayden Willmott	Canada	24.66	16.66	24.66	
25	12	Kaditane Gomis	France	14.33	14.33	14.33	
26	16	Steven Kahnert	Canada	8.66	4.66	8.66	

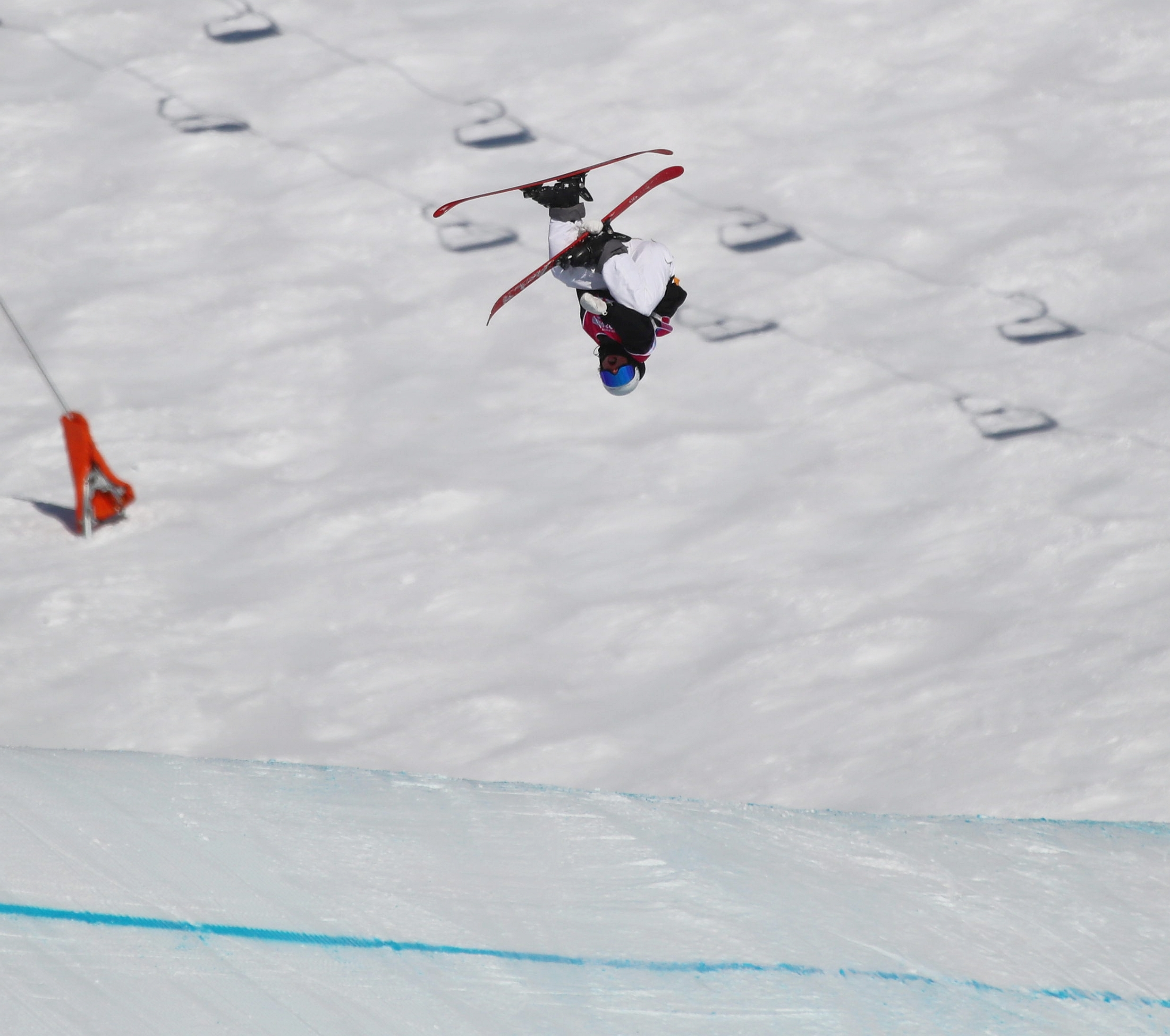
Matěj Švancer

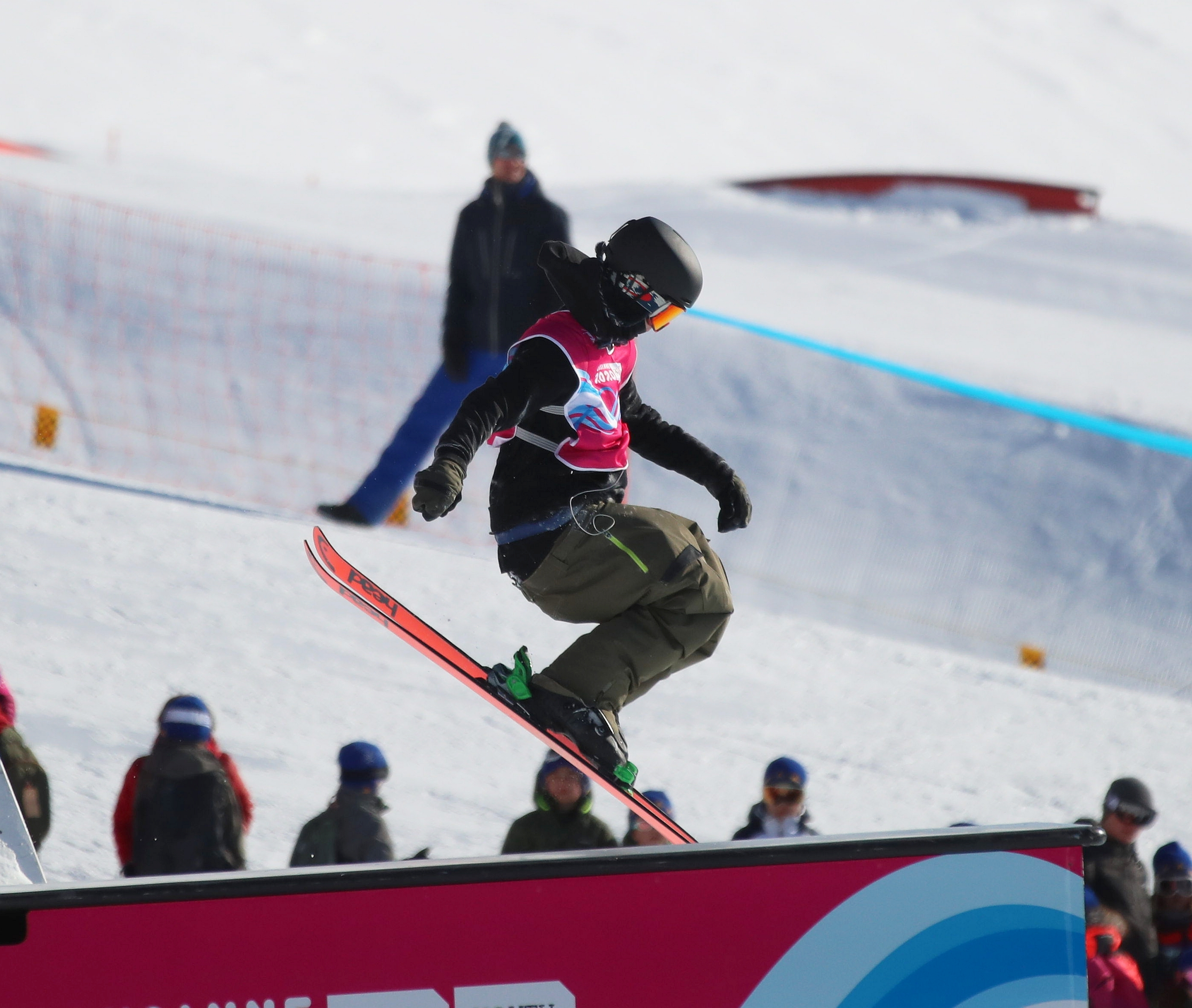
Melvin Morén

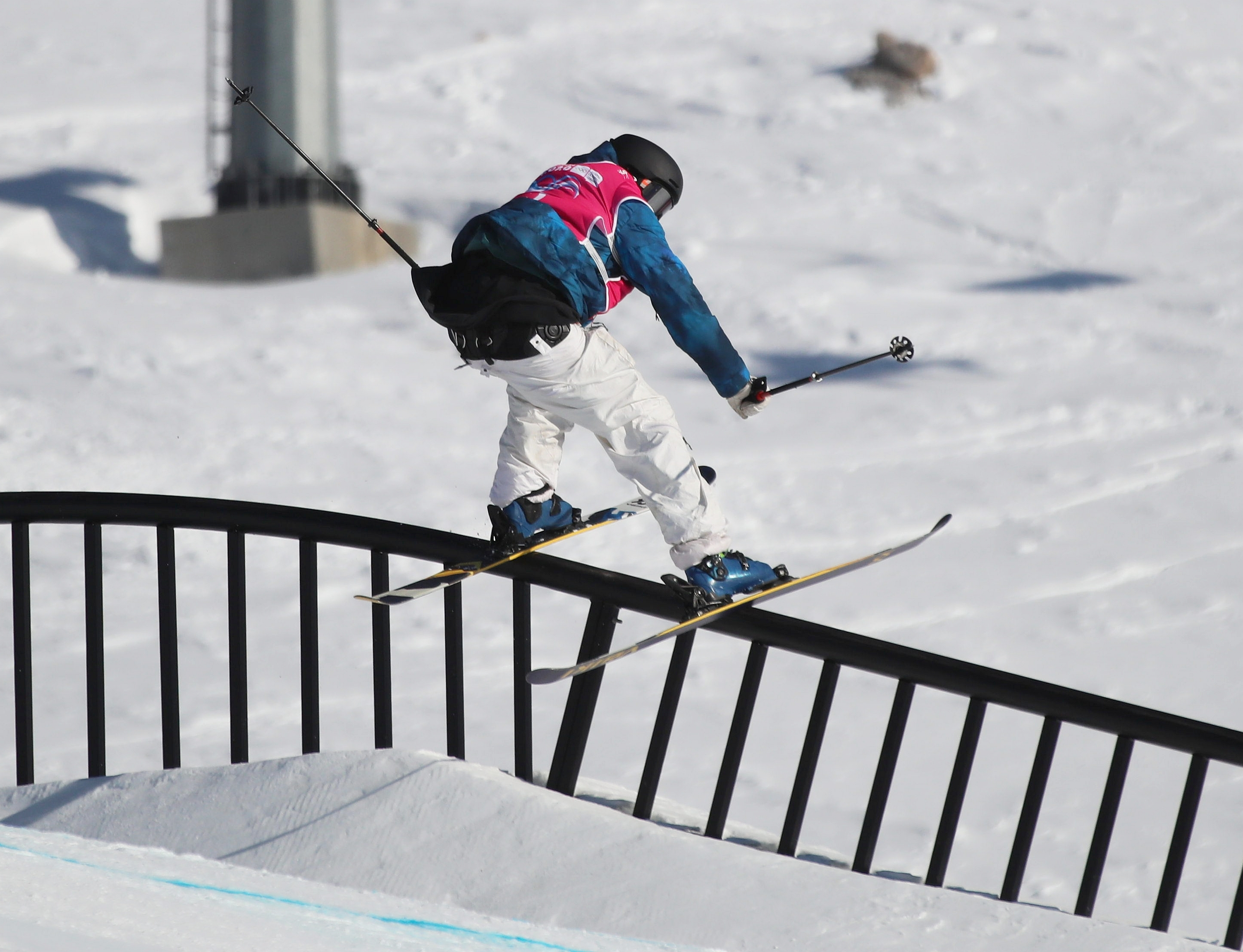
Kiernan Fagan

== Final ==
The final was started at 12:20.

Rank	Start order	Bib	Name	Country	Run 1	Run 2	Run 3	Best
1st place, gold medalist(s)	10	5	Kiernan Fagan	United States	87.33	90.66	35.33	90.66
2nd place, silver medalist(s)	11	2	Melvin Morén	Sweden	78.33	46.66	89.33	89.33
3rd place, bronze medalist(s)	9	4	Hunter Henderson	United States	32.00	88.66	83.66	88.66
4	12	22	Matěj Švancer	Czech Republic	85.00	84.33	27.66	85.00
5	7	14	Nils Rhyner	Switzerland	62.33	58.33	83.33	83.33
6	3	10	Fantin Ciompi	Switzerland	30.00	80.66	78.33	80.66
7	8	21	Daniel Bacher	Austria	40.66	79.33	69.00	79.33
8	1	23	Ruka Ito	Japan	21.66	11.66	75.66	75.66
9	6	3	Orest Kovalenko	Ukraine	16.33	27.66	70.00	70.00
10	5	11	Luca Harrington	New Zealand	67.33	64.33	57.66	67.33
11	4	13	Tevje Skaug	Norway	36.33	66.33	63.66	66.33
12	2	19	David Zehentner	Germany	48.33	17.66	35.00	48.33

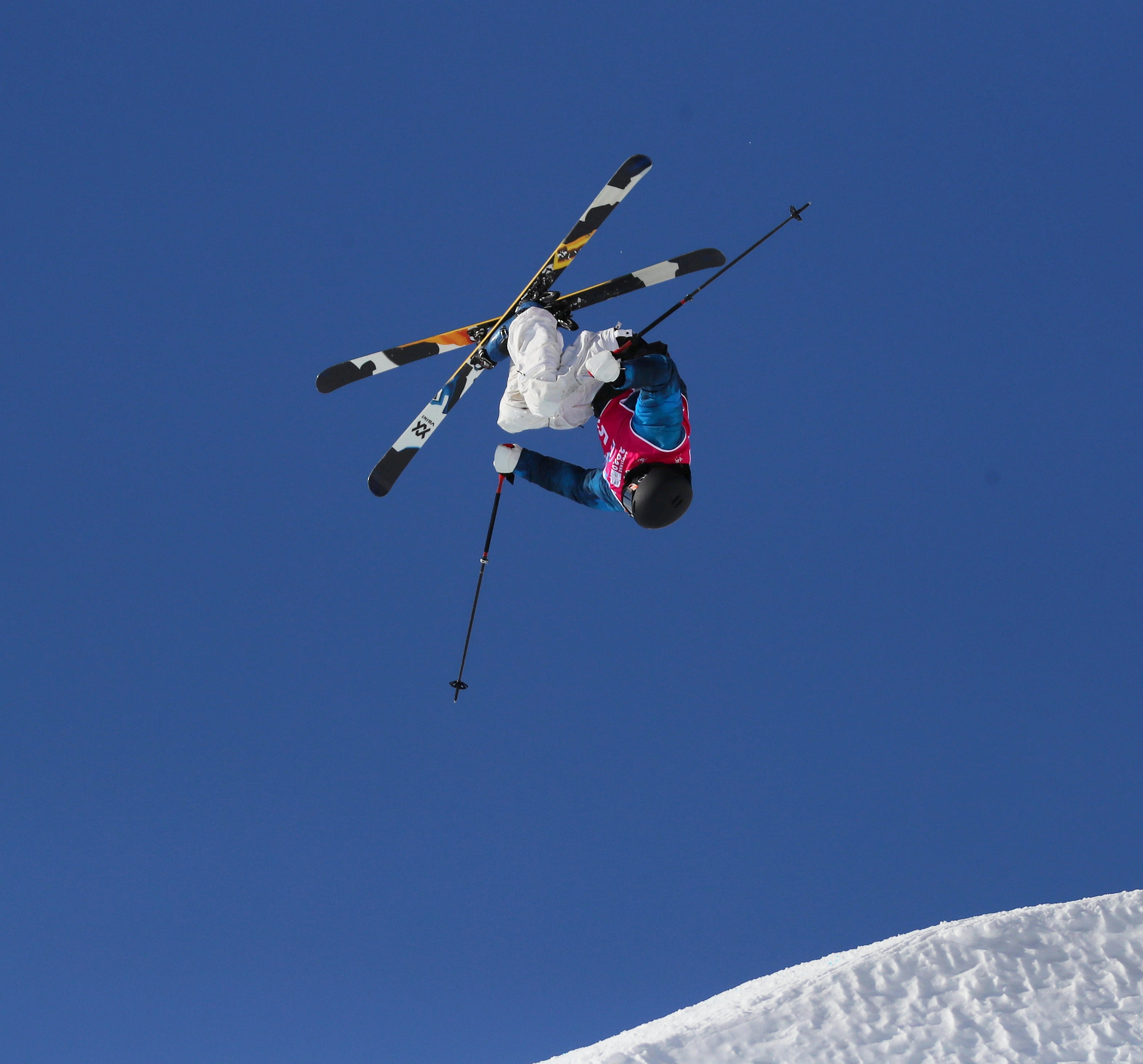
Kiernan Fagan

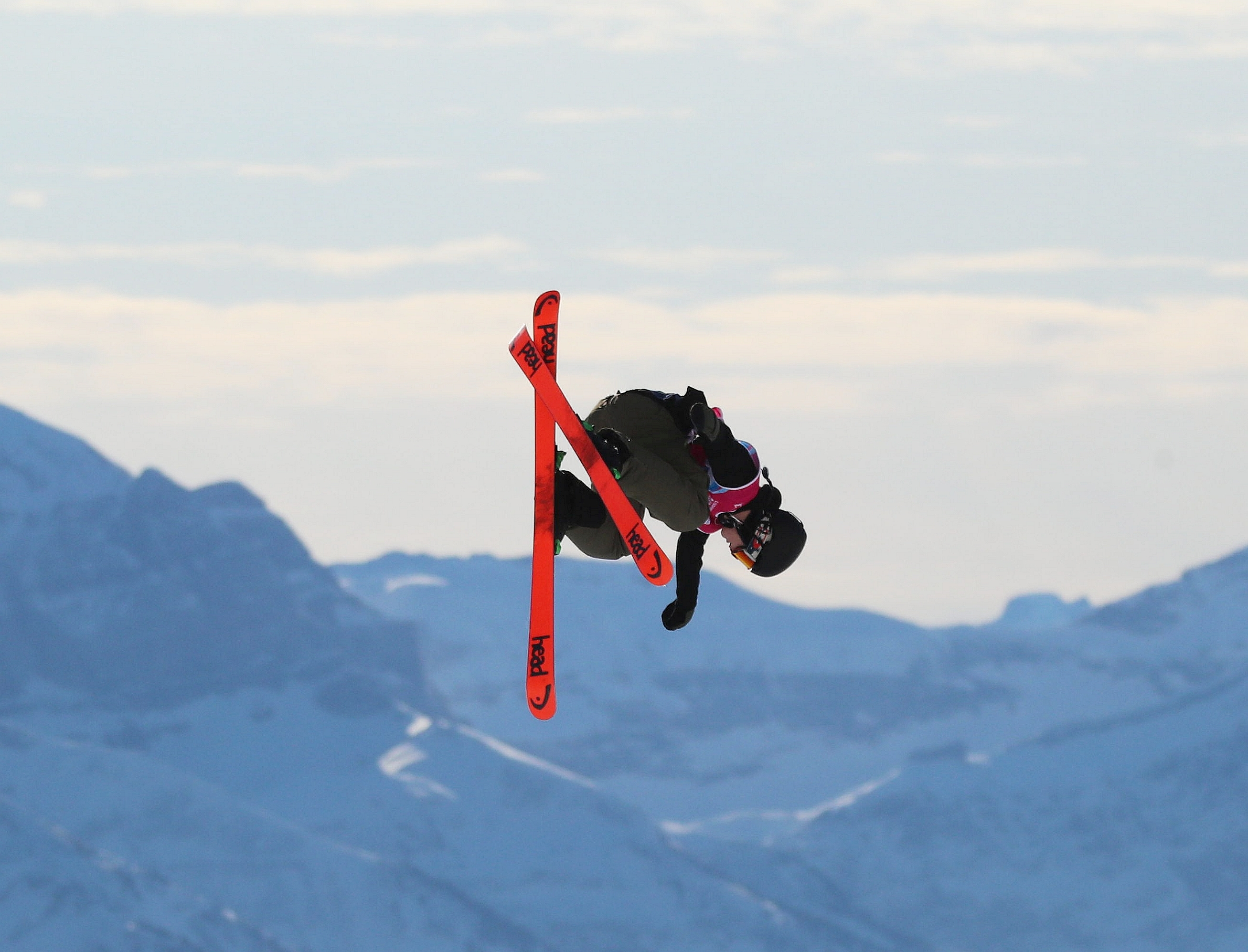
Melvin Morén

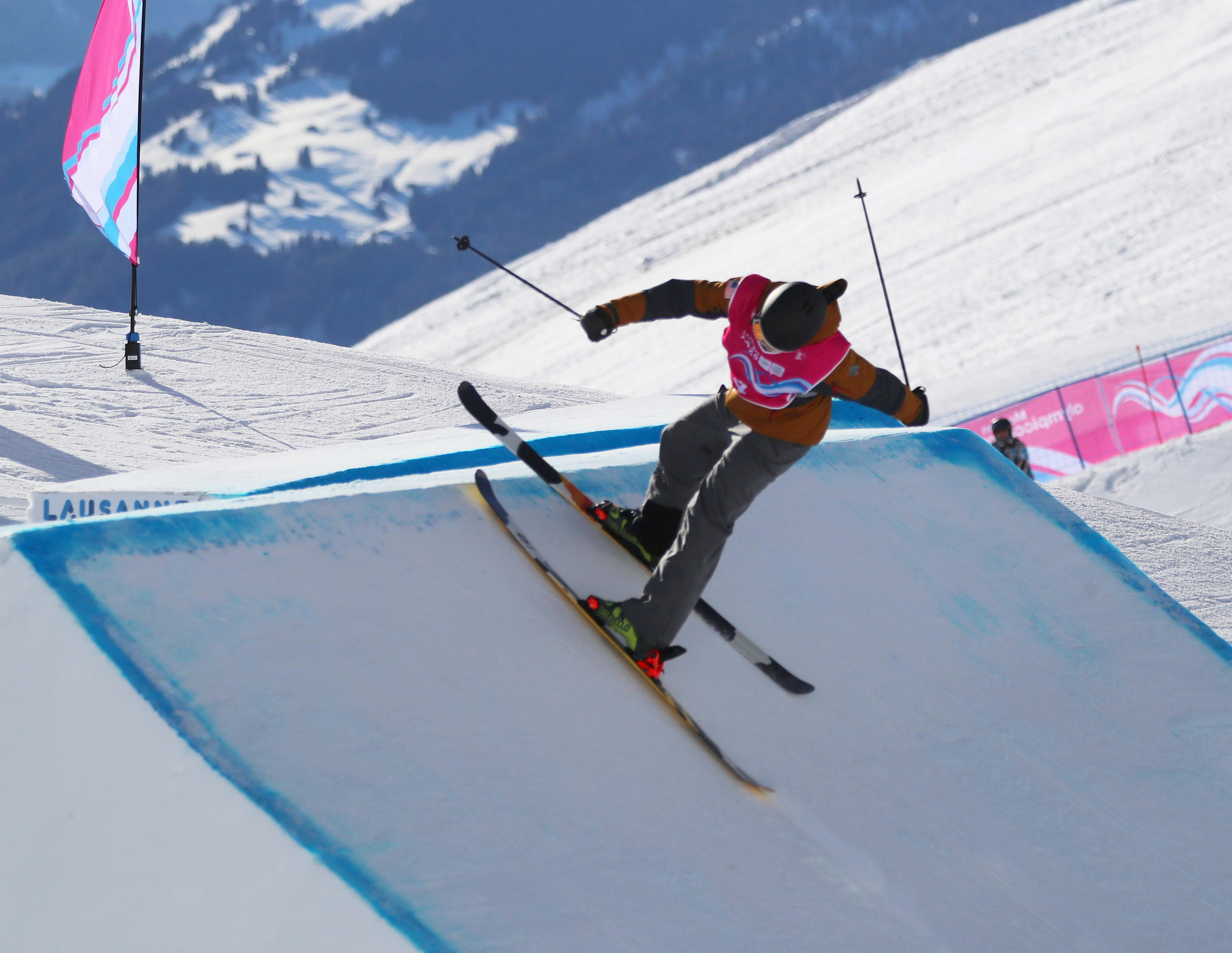
Hunter Henderson
