= Freestyle skiing at the 2020 Winter Youth Olympics – Boys' big air =

Boys' big air at the III Winter Youth Olympic Games
- Venue: Leysin Park & Pipe
- Dates: 22 January
- Competitors: 24 from 15 nations
- Winning points: 186.00

Medalists
1st place, gold medalist(s)		Matěj Švancer	Czech Republic
2nd place, silver medalist(s)		Kiernan Fagan	United States
3rd place, bronze medalist(s)		Orest Kovalenko	Ukraine

The boys' big air event in freestyle skiing at the 2020 Winter Youth Olympics took place on 22 January at the Leysin Park & Pipe.

== Qualification ==
The qualification was started at 09:30.

Rank	Bib	Name	Country	Run 1	Run 2	Best	Notes
1	4	Hunter Henderson	United States	87.50	72.50	87.50	Q
2	5	Tormod Frostad	Norway	30.25	86.75	86.75	Q
3	3	Melvin Morén	Sweden	85.75	66.25	85.75	Q
4	20	Luca Harrington	New Zealand	85.25	34.75	85.25	Q
5	1	Orest Kovalenko	Ukraine	83.00	25.25	83.00	Q
6	2	Kiernan Fagan	United States	79.00	25.00	79.00	Q
7	22	Štěpán Hudeček	Czech Republic	78.25	43.00	78.25	Q
8	10	Matěj Švancer	Czech Republic	20.75	78.00	78.00	Q
9	9	Daniel Bacher	Austria	77.25	77.50	77.50	Q
10	7	Jasper Klein	Great Britain	76.25	15.25	76.25	Q
11	13	Tevje Skaug	Norway	74.50	55.50	74.50	Q
12	26	David Zehentner	Germany	73.50	50.50	73.50	Q
13	11	Nicola Bolinger	Switzerland	72.50	58.50	72.50	
14	17	Sampo Yliheikkilä	Finland	71.25	14.50	71.25	
15	6	Ben Barclay	New Zealand	68.50	56.75	68.50	
16	8	Ruka Ito	Japan	60.00	62.25	62.25	
17	15	Jošt Klančar	Slovenia	56.00	12.25	56.00	
18	21	Klemen Vidmar	Slovenia	55.00	51.50	55.00	
19	12	Nils Rhyner	Switzerland	54.00	43.75	54.00	
20	18	Martin Nordqvist	Sweden	32.50	53.50	53.50	
21	19	Andrew Longino	Canada	33.75	50.00	50.00	
22	14	Kaditane Gomis	France	49.25	16.75	49.25	
23	24	Fantin Ciompi	Switzerland	23.50	24.25	24.25	
24	23	Steven Kahnert	Canada	14.25	17.75	17.75	
	16	Brayden Willmott	Canada	Did not start			
	25	Max McDonald	New Zealand	Did not start			

== Final ==
The final was started at 11:35.

Rank	Start order	Bib	Name	Country	Run 1	Run 2	Run 3	Total
1st place, gold medalist(s)	5	10	Matěj Švancer	Czech Republic	91.50	78.00	94.50	186.00
2nd place, silver medalist(s)	7	2	Kiernan Fagan	United States	88.75	94.25	87.00	183.00
3rd place, bronze medalist(s)	8	1	Orest Kovalenko	Ukraine	83.25	86.50	93.00	179.50
4	12	4	Hunter Henderson	United States	89.50	43.50	85.75	175.25
5	11	5	Tormod Frostad	Norway	83.75	26.50	88.50	172.25
6	4	9	Daniel Bacher	Austria	79.25	77.00	14.75	156.25
7	1	26	David Zehentner	Germany	64.00	70.00	78.00	148.00
8	10	3	Melvin Morén	Sweden	89.25	45.00	24.00	134.25
9	3	7	Jasper Klein	Great Britain	61.25	72.50	36.25	133.75
10	2	13	Tevje Skaug	Norway	76.00	40.25	41.00	117.00
11	6	22	Štěpán Hudeček	Czech Republic	43.25	19.25	30.00	73.25
12	9	20	Luca Harrington	New Zealand	23.75	25.25	DNS	25.25
