= Urness =

Urness is a surname. Notable people with the surname include:

- John A. Urness (1873–1947), American politician
- Naomi Urness (born 2004), Canadian freestyle skier
- Ted Urness (1937–2018), American football player
- Zoë Marieh Urness (born 1984), Native American photographer

== See also ==
- Urnes (disambiguation)
- Urness Township, Douglas County, Minnesota
