= Tabanelli =

Tabanelli is a surname. Notable people with the surname include:

- Andrea Tabanelli (1961–2020), Italian wheelchair curler
- Andrea Tabanelli (born 1990), Italian footballer
- Flora Tabanelli (born 2007), Italian freestyle skier
- Miro Tabanelli (born 2004), Italian freestyle skier
