= Yan Havriuk =

Ukrainian freestyle skier (born 2004)

Personal information
- Full name: Ян Костянтинович Гаврюк
- Born: 24 December 2004 (age 21) Rivne, Ukraine

Sport
- Sport: Skiing

World Cup career
- Indiv. podiums: 1
- Updated on 23 January 2026

Yan Havriuk (Ukrainian: Ян Костянтинович Гаврюк; born 24 December 2004) is a Ukrainian freestyle skier, specializing in aerials.

== Career ==
Havriuk's World Cup debut occurred on March 5, 2023, in Engadin, Switzerland, where he was 22nd. Havriuk competed at three Junior World Championships. As of 2025, his best result is 9th in 2024.

His first World Cup podium came on 11 January 2026 when he finished 2nd in Deer Valley, United States. He became third Ukrainian to win a podium rank during the season.

In 2026, Yan Havriuk was nominated for his first Winter Games in Cortina d'Ampezzo.

== Personal life ==
Havriuk is student of the Rivne State University of the Humanities where he studies physical culture for secondary education.

== Career results ==
=== Winter Olympics ===
Year	Place	Aerials	Team event
2026	Cortina d'Ampezzo, Italy	21	—

=== World Cup ===
==== Individual podiums ====
Season	Place	Rank
2025–26	Lake Placid, United States	2

==== Individual rankings ====
Season	Aerials
2022–23	39
2023–24	28
2024–25	24
2025–26	12

=== European Cup ===
==== Individual podiums ====
Season	Place	Rank
2023–24	Chiesa in Valmalenco, Italy	3
