= Urnes =

Urnes may refer to:

- Urnes Style
- Urnes Stave Church, whose doorway carvings gave the name to the style

== See also ==
- Urne (disambiguation)
- Urness
