= John A. Urness =

American farmer and politician

Member of the Minnesota House of Representatives from the Douglas County district
- In office January 6, 1919 – January 2, 1921
- Preceded by: Hans Birkhofer
- Succeeded by: L. E. Olson

Personal details
- Born: November 3, 1873 Urness Township, Minnesota
- Died: November 5, 1951 (aged 78)
- Other political affiliations: Nonpartisan League
- Spouse: Anna Larson
- Occupation: Farmer

John A. Urness (November 3, 1873 – November 5, 1951) was an American farmer and former politician who served as a member of the Minnesota House of Representatives for one term. He represented Douglas County from 1919 until 1921.

== Biography ==
Urness was born in Urness Township, Minnesota on November 3, 1873, to Andrew Urness and Antonette Urness (née Jacobson). John's father had been involved in founding the township, which was named after the family.

Urness first ran for political office in 1918, in the Douglas County district in the Minnesota House of Representatives He was endorsed by the Nonpartisan League, which had begun making moves into Minnesota that year. He was elected by a 39-point margin against fellow farmer Gilbert J. Thompson.

In the opening session of the 1919–20 legislature, Urness was nominated as the Nonpartisan League candidate for Speaker of the House. In September 1919, Urness co-introduced legislation alongside state senator Ivey J. Lee to ban the export of frog legs from Minnesota.

During the session Urness broke with the League and ran as an independent for re-election, having lost the endorsement of the League at the convention, in 1920. He faced fellow farmer Lewis E. Olson, who had the backing of the Nonpartisan League that year. He was defeated for re-election by a 13-point margin.

In 1933, Urness was elected president of the Douglas County Farm Holiday Association after a period of leadership struggle.
