= Dylan Deschamps =

Canadian freestyle skier (born 2002)

Personal information
- Born: December 12, 2002 (age 23) Quebec City, Quebec, Canada

Sport
- Country: Canada
- Sport: Freestyle skiing
- Event: Big air
Medal record
Men's freestyle skiing
Representing Canada
Winter X Games
Bronze medal – third place	2026 Aspen	Big Air

Dylan Deschamps (born December 12, 2002) is a Canadian freestyle skier specializing in big air. He represented Canada at the 2026 Winter Olympics.

== Career ==
During the 2023–24 FIS Freestyle Ski World Cup, Deschamps earned his first career World Cup victory on October 19, 2023, in only his third World Cup competition. During the first big air competition of the 2024–25 FIS Freestyle Ski World Cup, he earned his second career podium on October 18, 2024, finishing in third place with a score of score of 172.25. On December 1, 2024, he earned his third career podium, again finishing in third place with a score of score of 181.00.

During the first big air competition of the 2025–26 FIS Freestyle Ski World Cup, he earned his fourth career World Cup podium on November 28, 2025, finishing in second place with a score of 178.50. In January 2026, he competed at the 2026 Winter X Games and won a bronze medal in the big air event with a score of 94.00. He was then selected to represent Canada at the 2026 Winter Olympics.
