= Urne =

Urne may refer to:

== People ==
- Christoffer Urne (1593–1663), Danish civil servant
- Jørgen Knudsen Urne (1598–1642), Danish nobleman
- Renate Urne (born 1982), Norwegian handball player

== Places ==
- Urne, Wisconsin, United States

== See also ==
- Urnes (disambiguation)
