= Naomi Urness =

Canadian freestyle skier (born 2004)

Personal information
- Born: August 5, 2004 (age 22) Mont-Tremblant, Canada

Sport
- Country: Canada
- Sport: Freestyle skiing
- Events: Slopestyle, Big air

Naomi Urness (born August 5, 2004) is a Canadian freestyle skier who competes internationally in the big air and slopestyle disciplines. She represented Canada at the 2026 Winter Olympics.

== Career ==
Urness first competed for Canada during the 2024-2025 World Cup stop in Stoneham.

Urness started the 2025-2026 World Cup with a silver medal in the big air at the first stop in Secret Garden, followed by a bronze in Beijing. The silver medal was her first World Cup medal. The following week Urness won the gold medal in the big air at the World Cup event in Steamboat. With the victory, Urness moved into first position in the World Cup standings, with one event remaining.

On 17 February 2026, Urness finished in sixth place in the big air event at the 2026 Olympic Games.

== Results ==
=== Olympic Winter Games ===
Year	Age	Slopestyle	Big Air
(Italy) 2026 Milano Cortina	21	7	5
