= Dundret =

Mountain in Sweden

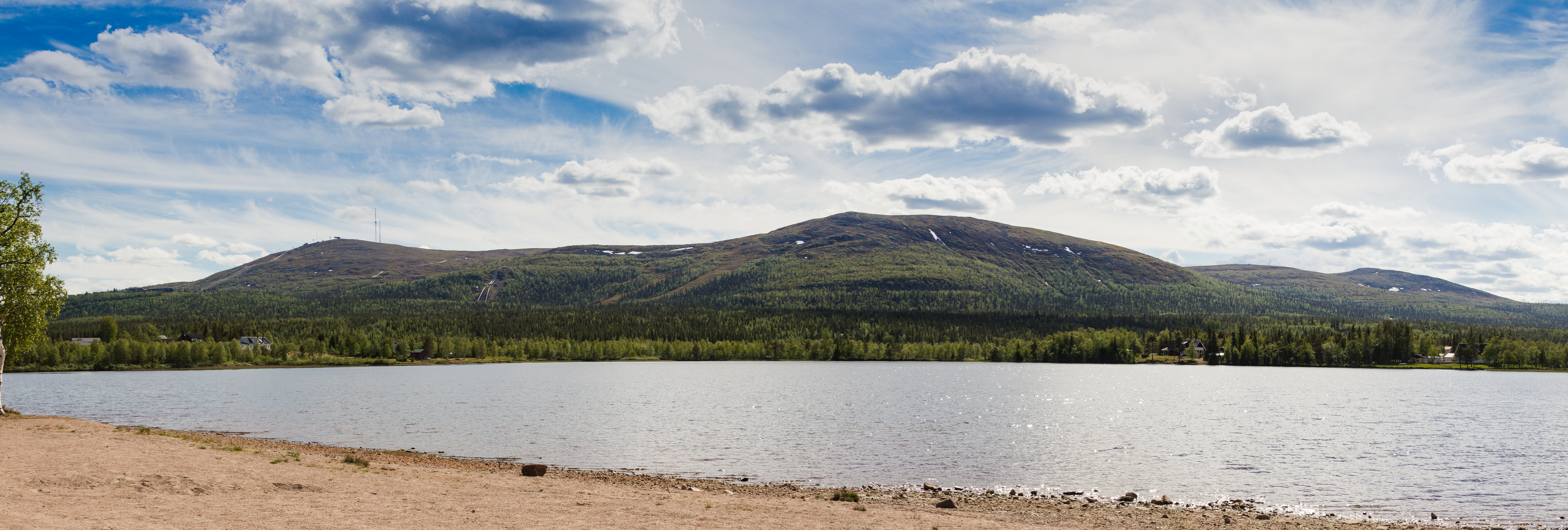
- Panoramic view of Dundret, Sweden, from the Sandviken beach in Gällivare.

Highest point
- Coordinates: 67.0944°N 20.5519°E

Naming
- Native name: Váhtjerduottar (Lule Sami)

Geography
- Location within Sweden

Dundret (Lule Sami: Váhtjerduottar; Meänkieli: Vasaratunturi) is a fell (823m above sea level), located just outside the town Gällivare in Sweden. Standing east of the main chain of the Scandinavian Mountains Dundret is an inselberg.

Dundret has a ski resort with nine pistes as well as a ramp for ski jumping and trails for cross country skiing. The skiing season at Dundret usually starts at the beginning of November and ends in late April. For this reason many national skiing teams start their seasonal training there. Through the years many international contests have been held at Dundret and in 1983 a downhill World cup competition took place here.

The peak of Dundret can be reached by car. From the western peak one eleventh of the area of Sweden can be seen in clear weather. The midnight sun is also clearly visible from the beginning of June to the middle of July.

The entire fell is a nature preserve, protected since 1970. The name Dundret comes from the Finnish word tunturi (fell), which in turn comes from the Sami word tuoddar (low fell). The Swedish word dundret means the thunder, but this is not the original meaning.

== See also ==
- Förfjäll
- Muddus plains
- Norrland terrain
