= Mac Forehand =

American freestyle skier (born 2001)

- Forehand in 2026

Personal information
- Born: August 4, 2001 (age 25) Norwalk, Connecticut, United States

Sport
- Country: United States
- Sport: Freestyle skiing
- Rank: 9th Overall (FIS World Cup Standings)
- Events: Big air, Slopestyle
- Club: Stratton Mountain School
Medal record
Men's freestyle skiing
Representing the United States
Olympic Games
Silver medal – second place	2026 Milano Cortina	Big Air
World Championships
Silver medal – second place	2025 Engadin	Slopestyle
Winter X Games
Gold medal – first place	2023 Aspen	Big air
Gold medal – first place	2026 Aspen	Big Air
Silver medal – second place	2022 Aspen	Big air
Silver medal – second place	2023 Aspen	Slopestyle
Bronze medal – third place	2024 Aspen	Slopestyle
Bronze medal – third place	2025 Aspen	Slopestyle

Mac Forehand (born August 4, 2001) is an American freestyle skier who competes internationally. At the 2026 Winter Olympics, he won a silver medal in the big air event. He also currently holds 6 medals from the Winter X Games and 11 FIS World Cup podiums.

== Background ==
Forehand grew up in Fairfield, Connecticut and got his start in skiing at Stratton Mountain Resort in Vermont.

== Career ==
He competes in the FIS Freestyle World Ski Championships, where he won the FIS Crystal Globe in slopestyle at 17 years old in his rookie season.

He competed in the 2022 Winter Olympics in Beijing at age 20. In the 2022 big air event, he qualified for the final and finished in 11th place. In the slopestyle event, he finished in 17th place.

At the 2026 Winter X Games in Aspen, Forehand won the gold medal in the Men's Ski Big Air event, scoring a 96.00 in his second run. He then participated at the 2026 Winter Olympics in Italy and won the silver medal in big air event with a score of 98.25 in his final run for a total of 193.25. He also placed 11th in the finals of the slopestyle event.

=== FIS World Cup Crystal Globes ===
Season	Discipline
2018–19	Slopestyle
2023–24	Slopestyle

=== FIS World Cup Podiums ===
Season	Podiums						
Season	Slopestyle			Big Air			Total
Season	1st place, gold medalist(s)	2nd place, silver medalist(s)	3rd place, bronze medalist(s)	1st place, gold medalist(s)	2nd place, silver medalist(s)	3rd place, bronze medalist(s)	Σ
2019	1	1					2
2021		1					1
2022		1					1
2024	1	2		1			4
2025		1			1		2
2026	1						1
Total	3	6		1	1		11
