= Urness Township, Douglas County, Minnesota =

Urness Township, Minnesota
- Township
- Location within the state of Minnesota Urness Township, Minnesota (the United States)
- Coordinates: 45°53′8″N 95°41′11″W
- Country: United States
- State: Minnesota
- County: Douglas

Area
  - Total: 35.7 sq mi (92.5 km^{2})
  - Land: 31.9 sq mi (82.7 km^{2})
  - Water: 3.8 sq mi (9.9 km^{2})
- Elevation: 1,280 ft (390 m)

Population (2000)
  - Total: 266
  - Density: 8.3/sq mi (3.2/km^{2})
- Time zone: UTC-6 (Central (CST))
  - Summer (DST): UTC-5 (CDT)
- FIPS code: 27-66406
- GNIS feature ID: 0665844

Urness Township is a township in Douglas County, Minnesota, United States. The population was 277 at the 2020 census.

Urness Township was organized in 1869, and is said to be named after a place in Norway.

== Geography ==
According to the United States Census Bureau, the township has a total area of 35.7 square miles (92.5 km^{2}), of which 31.9 square miles (82.6 km^{2}) is land and 3.8 square miles (9.9 km^{2}) (10.69%) is water.

== Demographics ==
As of the census of 2000, there were 266 people, 105 households, and 82 families residing in the township. The population density was 8.3 people per square mile (3.2/km^{2}). There were 183 housing units at an average density of 5.7/sq mi (2.2/km^{2}). The racial makeup of the township was 98.50% White, 0.75% Asian, and 0.75% from two or more races. Hispanic or Latino of any race were 1.13% of the population.

There were 105 households, out of which 24.8% had children under the age of 18 living with them, 71.4% were married couples living together, 1.9% had a female householder with no husband present, and 21.0% were non-families. 19.0% of all households were made up of individuals, and 11.4% had someone living alone who was 65 years of age or older. The average household size was 2.53 and the average family size was 2.84.

In the township the population was spread out, with 21.8% under the age of 18, 9.0% from 18 to 24, 24.1% from 25 to 44, 29.7% from 45 to 64, and 15.4% who were 65 years of age or older. The median age was 42 years. For every 100 females, there were 104.6 males. For every 100 females age 18 and over, there were 108.0 males.

The median income for a household in the township was $39,583, and the median income for a family was $43,958. Males had a median income of $23,750 versus $21,000 for females. The per capita income for the township was $17,054. About 2.7% of families and 8.3% of the population were below the poverty line, including 11.6% of those under the age of eighteen and 7.3% of those 65 or over.
