= Konnor Ralph =

American freestyle skier (born 2003)

Personal information
- Full name: Konnor William Ralph
- Born: January 27, 2003 (age 23) Libby, Montana, U.S.
- Home town: Helena, Montana, U.S.

Sport
- Sport: Freestyle skiing
- Event(s): Big air, Slopestyle

Konnor William Ralph (born January 27, 2003) is an American freestyle skier. Ralph started skiing at Great Divide Ski Area near Helena when he was two years old. He represented the United States at the 2026 Winter Olympics.

== Career ==
During the 2023–24 FIS Freestyle Ski World Cup he earned his first career World Cup podium on March 16, 2024, finishing in third place in slopestyle.

During the 2025–26 FIS Freestyle Ski World Cup he earned his second career World Cup podium on February 6, 2025, finishing in third place in big air.

During the 2025–26 FIS Freestyle Ski World Cup he earned his third career World Cup podium on December 13, 2025, finishing in second place in big air.

In January 2026, he was selected to represent the United States at the 2026 Winter Olympics. He made the finals in both slopestyle and big air, placing 9th overall in slopestyle and 5th overall in men’s big air.
