= Elias Syrjä =

Finnish freestyle skier (born 1998)

Personal information
- Born: 28 August 1998 (age 28) Oulu, Finland

Sport
- Sport: Freestyle skiing
- Events: Big air, Slopestyle
Medal record
Men's freestyle skiing
Representing Finland
World Championships
Silver medal – second place	2025 Engadin	Big air

Elias Syrjä (born 28 August 1998) is a Finnish freestyle skier. He represented Finland at the 2026 Winter Olympics.

== Career ==
In March 2025, Syrjä competed at the 2025 FIS Freestyle Ski World Championships and won a silver medal in the big air event with a score of 184.25 points. He also competed in the slopestyle event and finished in fifteenth place with a score of 48.80 points.
