= Birk Ruud =

Norwegian freestyle skier (born 2000)

Personal information
- Born: 2 April 2000 (age 26) Bærum, Norway
- Height: 180 cm (5 ft 11 in)

Sport
- Country: Norway
- Sport: Freestyle skiing
- Events: Big air, Halfpipe, Slopestyle
- Club: Bærums SK
Medal record
Men's freestyle skiing
Representing Norway
Olympic Games
| Gold medal – first place | 2022 Beijing | Big air |
| Gold medal – first place | 2026 Milano Cortina | Slopestyle |
World Championships
| Gold medal – first place | 2023 Bakuriani | Slopestyle |
| Gold medal – first place | 2025 Engadin | Slopestyle |
| Silver medal – second place | 2019 Utah | Slopestyle |
| Bronze medal – third place | 2023 Bakuriani | Big air |
| Bronze medal – third place | 2025 Engadin | Big air |
Winter X Games
| Gold medal – first place | 2018 Norway | Big air |
| Gold medal – first place | 2019 Aspen | Big air |
| Gold medal – first place | 2024 Aspen | Slopestyle |
| Silver medal – second place | 2020 Aspen | Big air |
| Silver medal – second place | 2020 Norway | Big air |
| Bronze medal – third place | 2023 Aspen | Big air |
Youth Olympic Games
| Gold medal – first place | 2016 Lillehammer | Slopestyle |

Birk Ruud (born 2 April 2000) is a Norwegian freestyle skier in halfpipe and slopestyle and Olympic champion in big air.

In 2016, he won Gold (Slopestyle) at the Winter Youth Olympics at Lillehammer.

He participated at the FIS Freestyle Ski and Snowboarding World Championships 2019, winning the silver medal in the slopestyle event.

He has won 4 medals (including 2 golds) in X Games (Norway 2018, Aspen 2019, Aspen 2020, Norway 2020).

During the 2022 Winter Olympics, Ruud qualified first in the inaugural big air event. During the final, Ruud secured the gold medal on his first run, scoring a combined score of 187.75. On his victory run, Ruud did a double 1440 mute holding the Norwegian flag, scoring perfect 69s in doing so.

Ruud won the gold medal for slopestyle skiing at the 2026 Winter Olympics, finishing with a score of 86.28 in the final.

== See also ==
- List of Youth Olympic Games gold medalists who won Olympic gold medals
