= Timothé Sivignon =

French freestyle skier (born 2003)

Personal information
- Born: 25 January 2003 (age 23)
- Home town: Annecy, France

Sport
- Country: France
- Sport: Freestyle skiing
- Events: Big air, Slopestyle

Timothé Sivignon (born 25 January 2003) is a French freestyle skier. He represented France at the 2026 Winter Olympics.

== Career ==
During the 2022–23 FIS Freestyle Ski World Cup, he earned his first career World Cup podium on 16 December 2022, finishing in second in big air with a score of 184.25. During the 2024–25 FIS Freestyle Ski World Cup, he earned his second career podium on 4 January 2025, again finishing in second place in big air with a score of 180.40.

In January 2026, he was selected to represent France at the 2026 Winter Olympics. During the big air qualification, he ranked seventh with a score of 178.00 and advanced to the finals.
