= Chris McCormick =

Scottish freestyle skier (born 1998)

Personal information
- National team: Great Britain
- Born: 13 June 1998 (age 27) Glasgow, Scotland, United Kingdom

Sport
- Country: Great Britain
- Sport: Freestyle Skiing

Chris McCormick (born 13 June 1998) is a Scottish freestyle skier. He represented Great Britain at the 2026 Winter Olympics.

McCormick competed at the Olympic Trials for the 2022 Winter Olympics. Although close, he did not receive a spot on the team. As Scotland's top freestyle skier, he qualified for Great Britain's team for the 2026 Winter Olympics, where he made his Olympic debut, competing in the men's big air and men's slopestyle events. McCormick had an ankle injury during the qualifying rounds and did not proceed to the finals.

McCormick grew up in Bearsden and began learning to ski at age six due to his family's proximity to a dryslope. His elder brothers developed an affinity for snowboarding, including his brother Matt who was a hopeful for the 2022 Winter Olympics before a concussion in 2020.

As of 2026, McCormick attends the Open University, where he is studying mathematics and physics.
