= Ulrik Samnøy =

Norwegian freestyle skier (born 2002)

Personal information
- Full name: Ulrik Max Harstad Samnøy
- Born: 11 January 2002 (age 24)

Sport
- Country: Norway
- Sport: Freestyle skiing
- Event(s): Big air, Slopestyle
- Club: Bærums SK
Medal record
Men's freestyle skiing
Representing Norway
World Junior Championships
Gold medal – first place	2019 Kläppen	Big air
Bronze medal – third place	2019 Kläppen	Slopestyle

Ulrik Max Harstad Samnøy (born 11 January 2002) is a Norwegian freestyle skier. He represented Norway at the 2026 Winter Olympics.

== Career ==
He competed at the 2019 FIS Freestyle Junior World Ski Championships and won a gold medal in the big air and a bronze medal in the slopestyle event. During the final race of the 2019–20 FIS Freestyle Ski World Cup, he earned his first career World Cup podium on 29 February 2020, finishing in third place.

During the 2025–26 FIS Freestyle Ski World Cup, he earned his first career World Cup victory on 6 December 2025 in big air. In January 2026 he was selected to represent the Norway at the 2026 Winter Olympics.
