= Matěj Švancer =

Czech-Austrian freestyle skier

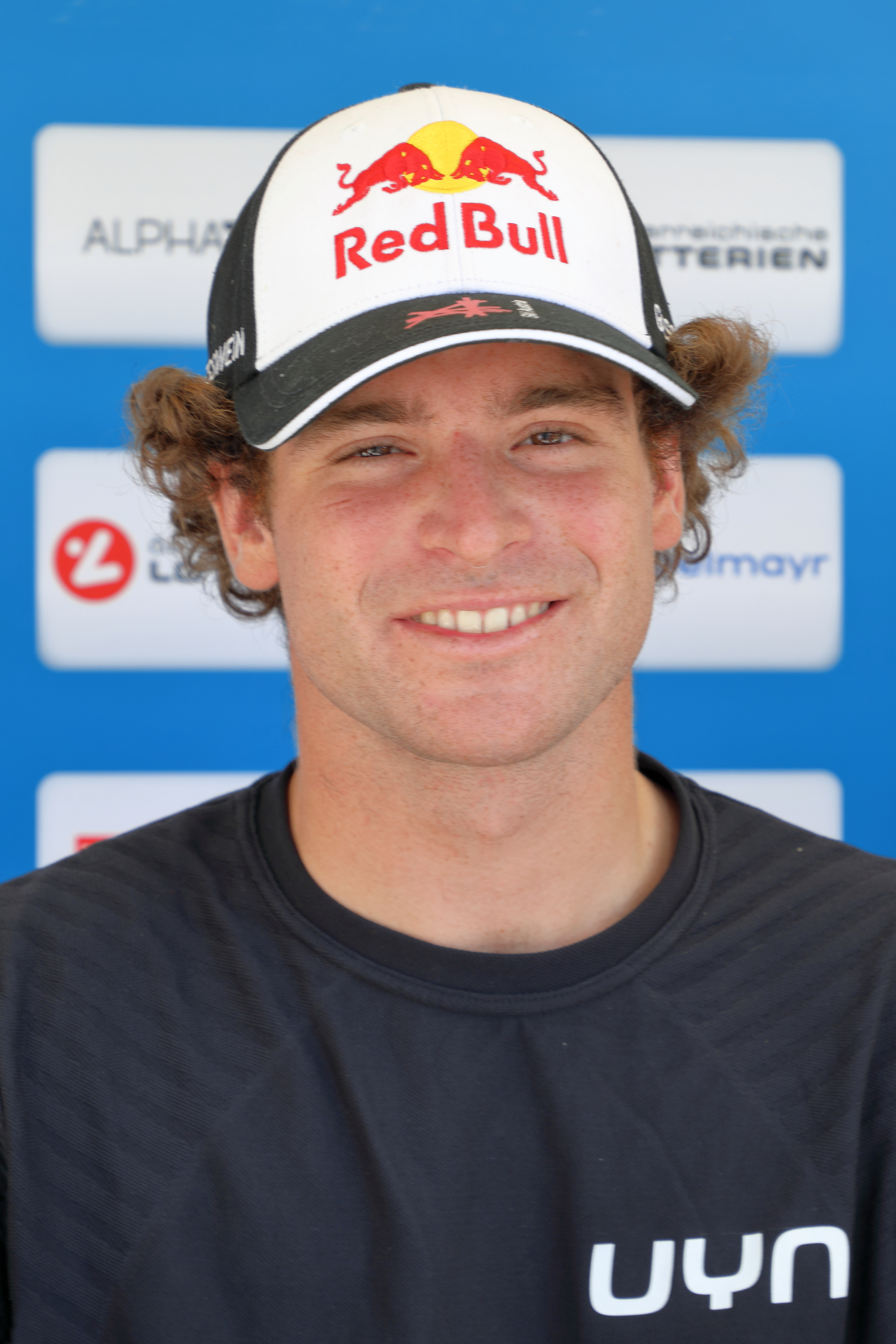
- Švancer in 2025

Personal information
- Nationality: Austrian
- Born: 26 March 2004 (age 22) Prague, Czech Republic

Sport
- Country: Czech Republic; Austria
- Sport: Freestyle skiing
- Events: Big air, Slopestyle
Medal record
Men's freestyle skiing
Representing Austria
Olympic Games
Bronze medal – third place	2026 Milano Cortina	Big Air
Winter X Games
Silver medal – second place	2023 Aspen	Knuckle Huck
Bronze medal – third place	2025 Aspen	Big Air
Representing Czech Republic
Winter Youth Olympics
Gold medal – first place	Lausanne 2020	Big Air
Junior World Championships
Gold medal – first place	2021 Krasnoyarsk	Big Air
Gold medal – first place	2019 Krasnoyarsk	Slopestyle

Matěj Švancer (Czech pronunciation: [ˈmacɛj ˈʃvantsɛr]; born 26 March 2004) is a Czech-Austrian freestyle skier in slopestyle and big air. After great successes at the junior level, including a gold medal at the Winter Youth Olympics and two junior world championship titles, he started for Austria in the 2021–22 season. At the 2026 Winter Olympics, he won a bronze medal in the big air event.

== Career ==
In 2020, Švancer won Gold (Big Air) at the Winter Youth Olympics at Leysin.

On 3 November 2019, Švancer made his debut in the FIS Freestyle Ski World Cup in Modena. After further starts in Deštné and Stubaital, he achieved his first top result in 2021 with sixth place in Kreischberg. After his naturalization in March 2020, the switch from the Czech Republic to Austria was approved by the FIS in June 2021 and he was accepted into the Austrian squad. On 22 October 2021, he beat Canadian Teal Harle at the big air in Chur with 99.0 points and thus celebrated his first World Cup victory. Six weeks later he also won the second and final Big Air World Cup of the season in Steamboat Springs, Colorado.
