= Troy Podmilsak =

American freestyle skier (born 2004)

Personal information
- Born: August 23, 2004 (age 21) Park City, Utah, U.S.

Sport
- Country: United States
- Sport: Freestyle skiing
- Event(s): Big air, Slopestyle
Medal record
Men's freestyle skiing
Representing the United States
World Championships
| Gold medal – first place | 2023 Bakuriani | Big air |
Winter X Games
| Gold medal – first place | 2024 Aspen | Big air |

Troy Podmilsak (born August 23, 2004) is an American freestyle skier specializing in big air and slopestyle disciplines. He is the 2023 World champion in big air, 2024 Winter X Games champion in big air, and represented the United States at the 2026 Winter Olympics.

== Career ==
Podmilsak competed at the 2022 FIS Freestyle Junior World Ski Championships and won gold medals in the big air and slopestyle events. On October 21, 2022, during the 2022–23 FIS Freestyle Ski World Cup, he earned his first World Cup podium finish.

Podmilsak represented the United States at the 2023 FIS Freestyle Ski World Championships in the big air event. During his second run he became the first person to land a triple 2160 mute grab, and won a gold medal with a score of 187.75 points.

In January 2024, he competed at the X Games and won a gold medal in the big air event.

== World Cup titles ==
| Season | |
| Season | Discipline |
| 2025–26 | Big Air |
