= Matias Roche =

French freestyle skier (born 2003)

Personal information
- Nationality: French
- Born: 6 December 2003 (age 22) Saint-Jean-de-Maurienne, France

Sport
- Country: France
- Sport: Freestyle skiing
- Events: Slopestyle, Big air
- Club: Club Omnisports Val Thorens

Matias Roche (born 6 December 2003) is a French freestyle skier who competed at the 2025 Freestyle Ski World Championships and the 2026 Olympics in the Slopestyle and Big air events.
