= Luca Harrington =

New Zealand freestyle skier (born 2004)

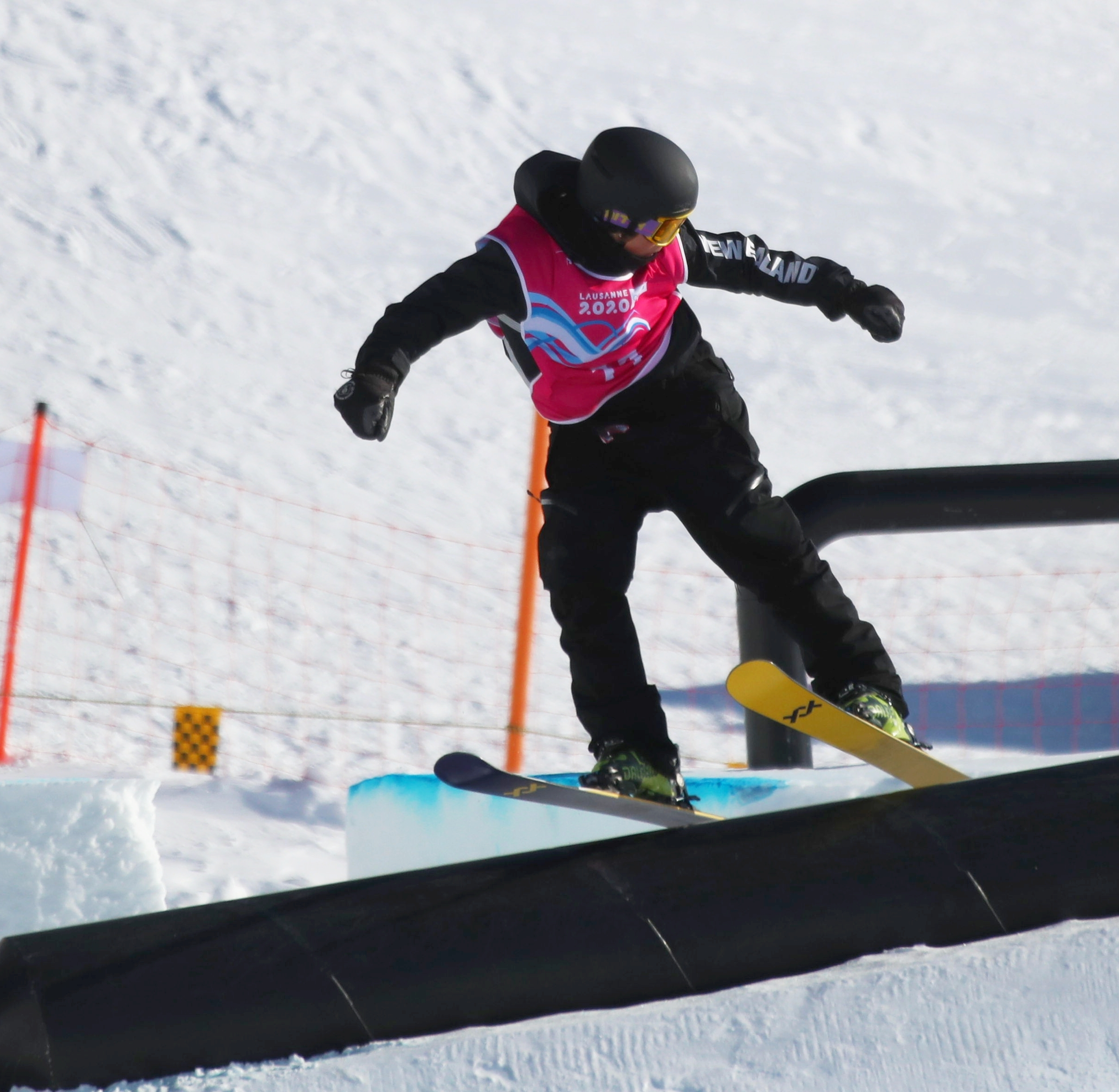
- Harrington at the 2020 Winter Youth Olympics

Personal information
- Born: 19 February 2004 (age 22)
- Home town: Wānaka, New Zealand

Sport
- Country: New Zealand
- Sport: Freestyle skiing
- Event(s): Big air, Slopestyle
Medal record
Men's freestyle skiing
Representing New Zealand
Olympic Games
Bronze medal – third place	2026 Milano Cortina	Slopestyle
World Championships
Gold medal – first place	2025 Engadin	Big air
Winter Youth Olympics
Bronze medal – third place	2020 Lausanne	Halfpipe
Winter X Games
Gold medal – first place	2025 Aspen	Slopestyle
Gold medal – first place	2026 Aspen	Slopestyle
Silver medal – second place	2025 Aspen	Big Air
Silver medal – second place	2026 Aspen	Big Air

Luca Harrington (born 19 February 2004) is a New Zealand freestyle skier. He is the 2026 Winter Olympic bronze medalist in slopestyle.

== Early life ==
Harrington grew up in Wānaka, New Zealand. His older brother, Ben, is also an Olympic freestyle skier.

== Career ==
Harrington represented New Zealand at the 2020 Winter Youth Olympics and was the flag-bearer during the closing ceremony. During the Youth Olympics he won a bronze medal in the halfpipe event with a score of 80.66 points.

During the 2024–25 FIS Freestyle Ski World Cup, he won the big air crystal globe with 390 points. He became the first New Zealander to win a crystal globe at the FIS Freestyle Ski World Cup.

In January 2025, he competed at the Winter X Games, where he was a late substitution for an injured athlete. During the slopestyle competition he landed a triple cork 1620 and won a gold medal with a score of 93.33 points. In March 2025, he competed at the 2025 FIS Freestyle Ski World Championships and won a gold medal in the big air event with a score of 192.00 points. He again competed at the 2026 Winter X Games and won a gold medal in slopestyle, and a silver medal in the big air event.

In January 2026, he was selected to represent New Zealand at the 2026 Winter Olympics. He competed in the slopestyle event and won a bronze medal with a score of 85.15. He then competed in the big air event. During qualification he ranked fifth with a score of 179.75 points and advanced to the finals.
