= Martin Nordqvist =

Swedish freestyle skier (born 2003)

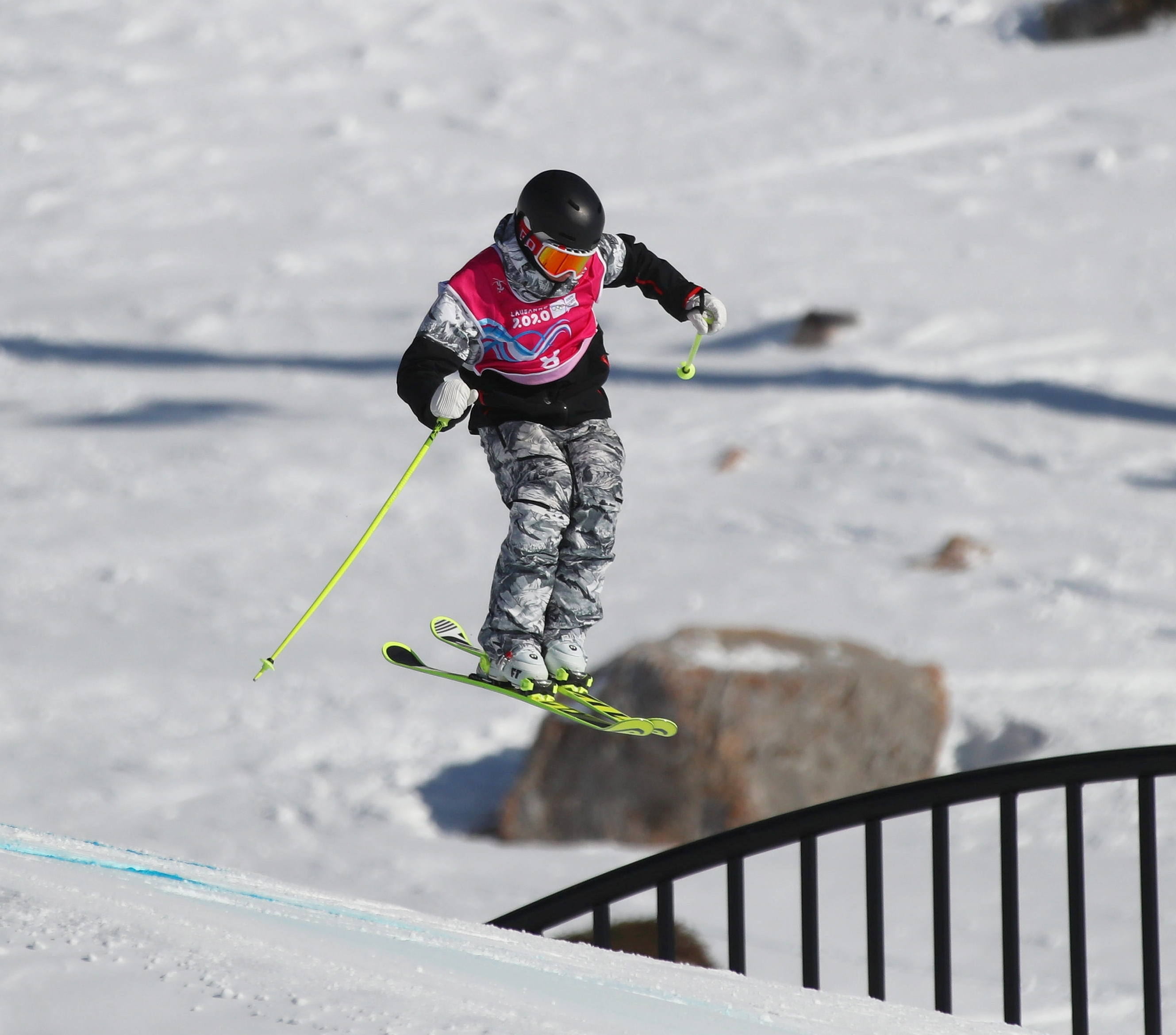
- Nordqvist at the 2020 Winter Youth Olympics

Personal information
- Born: 13 September 2003 (age 22) Jukkasjärvi, Sweden

Sport
- Country: Sweden
- Sport: Freestyle skiing
- Event(s): Big air, Slopestyle

Martin Nordqvist (born 13 September 2003) is a Swedish freestyle skier. He represented Sweden at the 2026 Winter Olympics.

== Career ==
In January 2026, he was selected to represent Sweden at the 2026 Winter Olympics. During the big air qualification, he scored 173.50 and advanced to the finals.
