= Tormod Frostad =

Norwegian freestyle skier (born 2002)

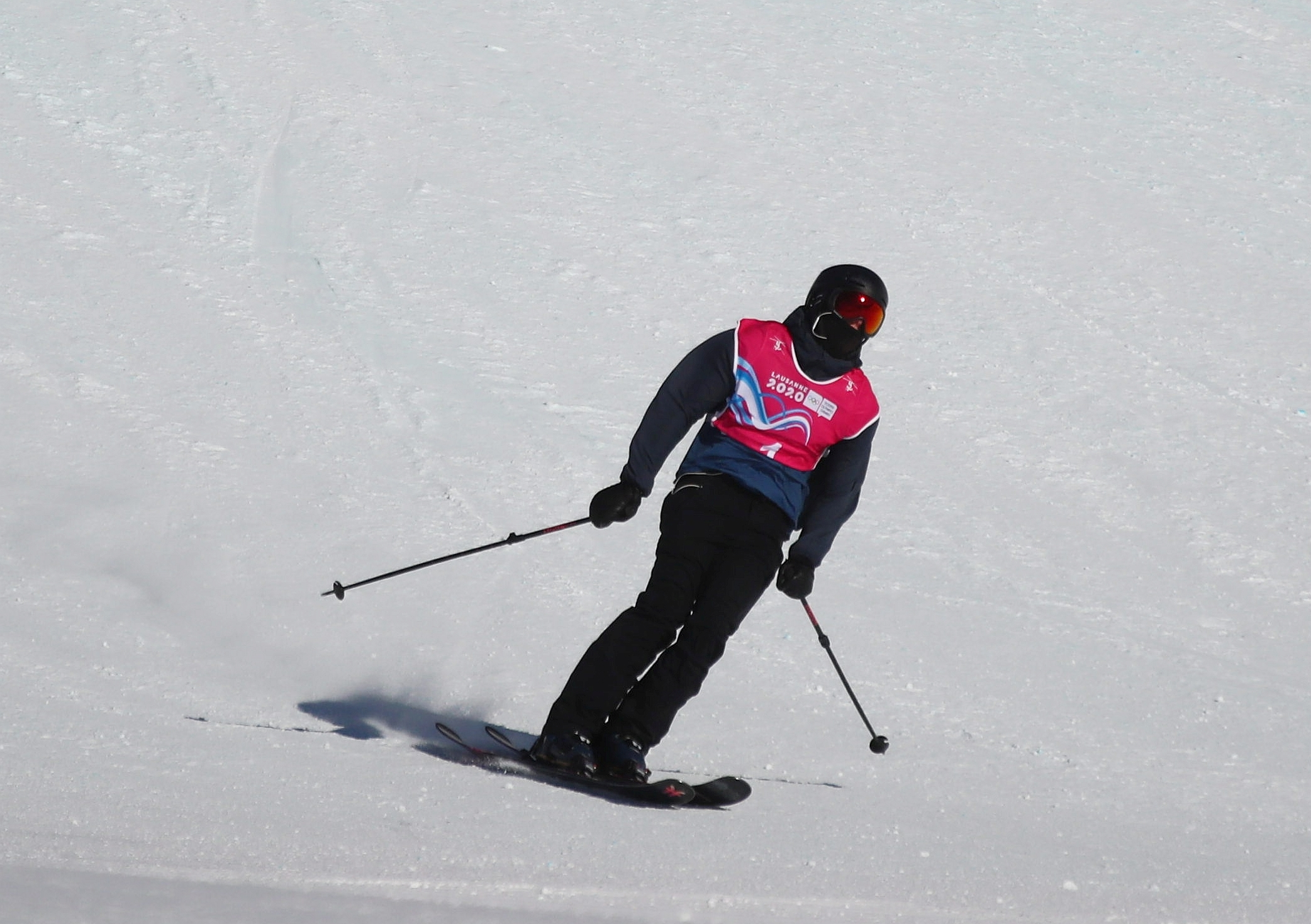
- Frostad in 2020

Personal information
- Nickname: Torm
- Born: 29 August 2002 (age 24)

Sport
- Country: Norway
- Sport: Freestyle skiing
- Event: Big air
- Club: Bærums SK
Medal record
Men's freestyle skiing
Representing Norway
Olympic Games
Gold medal – first place	2026 Milano Cortina	Big Air

Tormod Frostad (born 29 August 2002) is a Norwegian freestyle skier. At the 2026 Winter Olympics, he won a gold medal in the big air event.

== Career ==
He competed in the big air & slopestyle at the 2022 Winter Olympics and 2026 Winter Olympics.

=== Olympics results ===
Year	Age	Slopestyle	Big Air
(China) 2022 Beijing	19	25	12
(Italy) 2026 Milano Cortina	23	12	1
