= Sebastian Schjerve =

Norwegian freestyle skier (born 2000)

Personal information
- Born: 16 March 2000 (age 25)

Sport
- Country: Norway
- Sport: Freestyle skiing
- Events: Slopestyle; Big air

Sebastian Schjerve (born 16 March 2000) is a Norwegian freestyle skier who competes internationally. He represented Norway at the 2026 Winter Olympics.

== Career ==
He competed in the FIS Freestyle Ski and Snowboarding World Championships 2021, where he placed eighth in men's ski big air.
