= Miro Tabanelli =

Italian freestyle skier (born 2004)

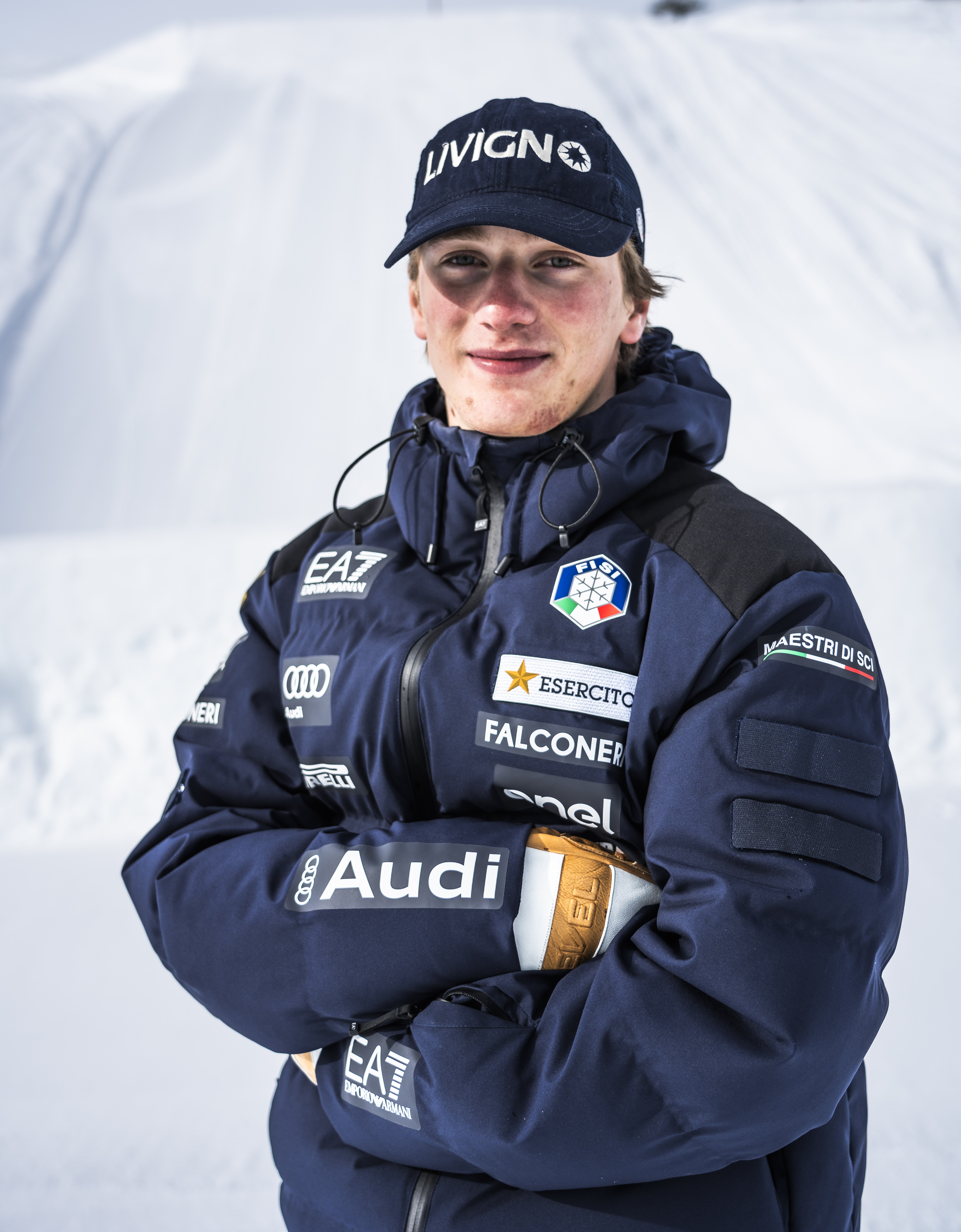
- Tabanelli in 2025

Personal information
- Born: 17 November 2004 (age 21) Ozzano dell'Emilia, Italy

Sport
- Sport: Freestyle skiing
- Club: Esercito
- Coached by: Valentino Mori
Medal record
Men's freestyle skiing
Representing Italy
Winter X Games
Gold medal – first place	2025 Aspen	Big air
World Junior Championships
Bronze medal – third place	2021 Krasnoyarsk	Big air

Miro Tabanelli (born 17 November 2004) is an Italian freestyle skier. He represented Italy at the 2026 Winter Olympics.

== Career ==
Tabanelli competed at the 2021 FIS Freestyle Junior World Ski Championships and won a bronze medal in big air.

During the 2023–24 FIS Freestyle Ski World Cup, Tabanelli earned his first career World Cup podium on 16 December 2023, finishing in second. During the 2024–25 FIS Freestyle Ski World Cup, he earned his first career World Cup victory on 13 March 2025 in big air. His sister, Flora Tabanelli, also won the women's big air competition. They became the first brother-sister duo to earn a World Cup victory at the same competition.

In January 2025, he competed at the 2025 Winter X Games and won a gold medal in the big air event. He became the first skier to land a 2340 in ski competition.

He represented Italy at the 2026 Winter Olympics, placing 25th in the big air event.

== Personal life ==
Tabanelli's younger sister, Flora, is also an Olympic freestyle skier.
