= Big air =

High-injury-risk sports discipline

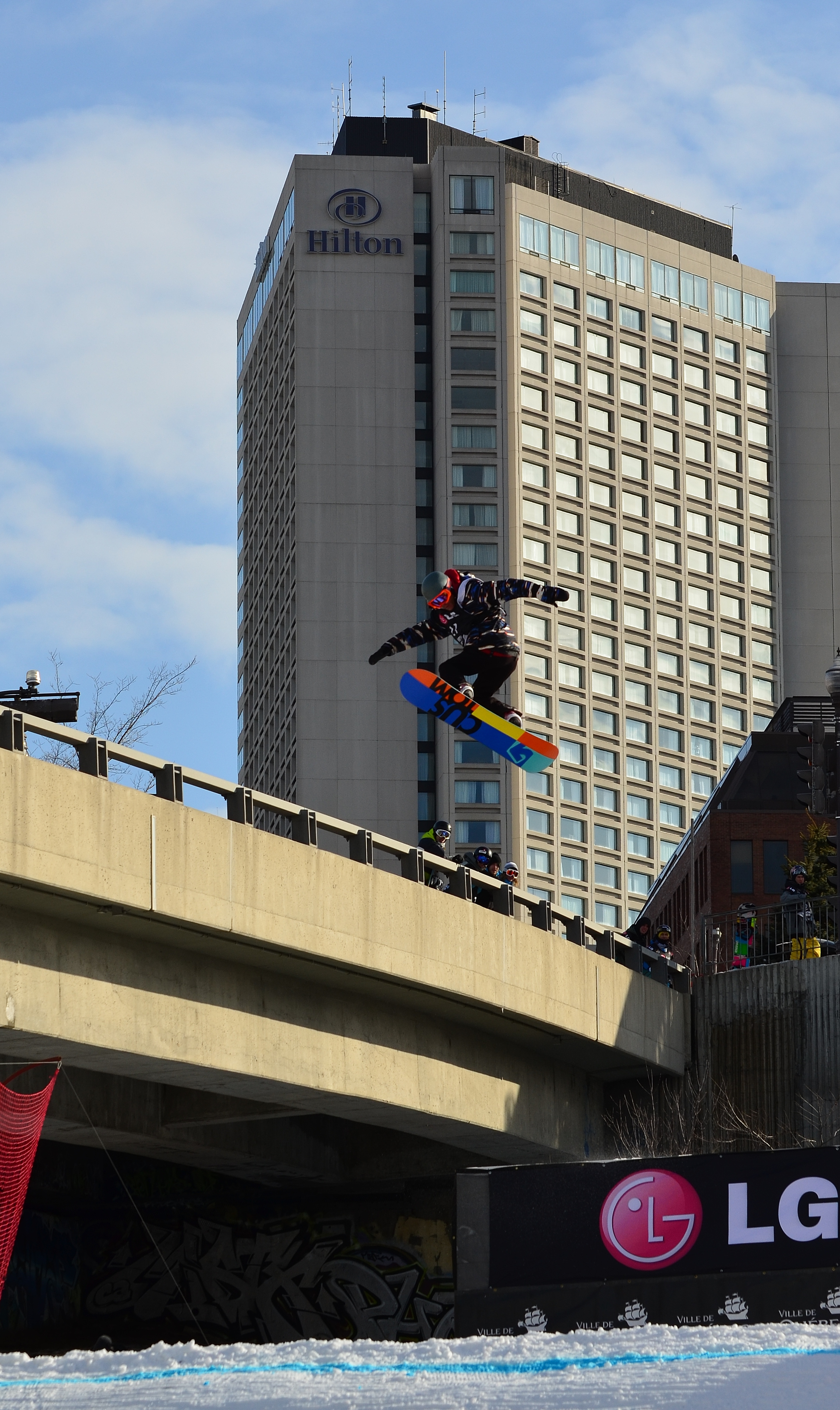
A snowboarder at a big air competition in downtown Québec.

Big air is a high-injury-risk sports discipline where the competitor rides a vehicle, such as a motocross motorcycle, a skateboard, a snowboard, or a pair of skis, down a hill or ramp and performs aerial tricks after launching off very large jumps. In most versions, there is one large jump and therefore only one opportunity to perform a trick. It is an extreme version of slopestyle. Competitors perform complex tricks in the air, aiming to attain sizable height and distance as well, all while making every effort to secure a clean landing. Many competitions also require the rider to do a specific trick to win the major prize. The term was coined by French-Canadians because of their love for the extreme nature of the event.

== Skiing and snowboarding ==
Since 2004, Big Air Skiing has been featured in the FIS Snowboard World Championships.

In 2018, Big Air became the newest snowboarding event introduced in the Olympic Games. Sébastien Toutant and Anna Gasser were the first male and female Olympic gold medalists in snowboard big air in 2018. Canada, China, and Japan are currently tied in men's Olympic big air snowboarding, with two medals each. Gasser holds the record for the most gold medals in women's big air snowboarding at two, with Zoi Sadowski-Synnott having the most Olympic medals overall at three.

In the 2022 Winter Olympic Games, the ski Big Air event was held for the first time in Olympic history. The dedicated venue was Big Air Shougang. Birk Ruud and Eileen Gu were the first two Olympic gold medalists in big air freestyle skiing that year. At the Winter Olympics, Norway holds the record for the most gold medals in men's big air freestyle skiing at two, while Gu holds the record for the most medals in women's big air freestyle skiing.

== Other sports ==
Big air BMX and skateboarding have featured events at ESPN's annual multi-sport X Games. The X Games variant of the event for both sports differs from the traditional format in that it requires two jumps, one on a 70-foot gap and a second off a 27-foot high quarterpipe.
