= FIS Freestyle Ski and Snowboarding World Championships 2021 – Men's ski big air =

Men's ski big air at the FIS Freestyle Ski and Snowboarding World Championships 2021
- Venue: Aspen/Snowmass
- Location: Aspen, United States
- Date: 15 March (qualification); 16 March
- Competitors: 47 from 17 nations
- Winning points: 185.25

Medalists
gold medal	Oliwer Magnusson	Sweden
silver medal	Édouard Therriault	Canada
bronze medal	Kim Gubser	Switzerland

The Men's ski big air competition at the FIS Freestyle Ski and Snowboarding World Championships 2021 was held on 16 March. A qualification was held on 15 March 2021.

== Qualification ==
The qualification was started on 15 March at 09:40. The six best skiers from each heat qualified for the final.

=== Heat 1 ===
Rank	Bib	Start order	Name	Country	Run 1	Run 2	Best	Notes
1	16	20	Oliwer Magnusson	Sweden	95.25	32.25	95.25	Q
2	4	4	Mac Forehand	United States	91.00	94.25	94.25	Q
3	1	2	Andri Ragettli	Switzerland	92.25	93.00	93.00	Q
4	9	3	Jesper Tjäder	Sweden	84.25	92.00	92.00	Q
5	30	17	Édouard Therriault	Canada	81.25	91.25	91.25	Q
6	53	6	Thibault Magnin	Spain	90.25	90.50	90.50	Q
7	8	5	Lukas Müllauer	Austria	89.50	25.50	89.50	
8	11	19	Henrik Harlaut	Sweden	88.75	27.25	88.75	
9	5	1	Colby Stevenson	United States	87.25	24.00	87.25	
10	26	25	Ralph Welponer	Italy	78.25	86.50	86.50	
11	21	21	Ferdinand Dahl	Norway	80.50	73.00	80.50	
12	25	13	Tyler Harding	Great Britain	79.75	31.75	79.75	
13	34	16	Ben Barclay	New Zealand	77.25	48.75	77.25	
14	37	18	Julius Forer	Austria	75.75	75.75	75.75	
15	12	14	Christian Nummedal	Norway	74.75	27.75	74.75	
16	33	23	Nils Rhyner	Switzerland	16.00	74.50	74.50	
17	38	9	Gen Fujii	Japan	67.00	74.25	74.25	
18	29	10	Taisei Yamamoto	Japan	73.50	72.75	73.50	
19	17	7	Max Moffatt	Canada	63.00	68.25	68.25	
20	41	24	David Zehentner	Germany	60.00	60.25	60.25	
21	42	15	Harry Wright	Great Britain	12.00	58.00	58.00	
22	49	12	Mateo Bonacalza	Argentina	56.75	11.50	56.75	
23	46	8	Dmitrii Makarov	Russian Ski Federation	18.25	34.50	34.50	
	50	11	Bailey Johnson	Australia	Did not start			
	45	22	Miika Virkki	Finland	Did not start			

=== Heat 2 ===
Rank	Bib	Start order	Name	Country	Run 1	Run 2	Best	Notes
1	3	4	Birk Ruud	Norway	96.00	49.25	96.00	Q
2	2	3	Alex Hall	United States	93.75	95.25	95.25	Q
3	13	18	Evan McEachran	Canada	94.50	92.25	94.50	Q
4	14	22	Kim Gubser	Switzerland	93.00	91.00	93.00	Q
5	6	1	Antoine Adelisse	France	92.25	26.00	92.25	Q
6	24	11	Sebastian Schjerve	Norway	91.00	27.25	91.00	Q
7	7	5	Teal Harle	Canada	90.00	87.00	90.00	
8	27	24	Timothé Sivignon	France	87.50	53.75	87.50	
9	10	2	James Woods	Great Britain	87.00	79.25	87.00	
10	39	20	Simo Peltola	Finland	80.00	86.50	86.50	
11	36	14	Kuura Koivisto	Finland	48.50	86.00	86.00	
12	32	23	Hannes Rudigier	Austria	47.00	85.50	85.50	
13	18	8	Finn Bilous	New Zealand	66.50	85.25	85.25	
14	31	10	Vincent Maharavo	France	75.50	84.00	84.00	
15	44	13	Leonardo Donaggio	Italy	82.25	83.50	83.50	
16	19	26	Javier Lliso	Spain	81.00	26.25	81.00	
17	35	21	Dmitrii Mulendeev	Russian Ski Federation	16.25	80.00	80.00	
18	43	15	Chris McCormick	Great Britain	78.25	51.50	78.25	
19	48	7	Vincent Veile	Germany	76.75	73.25	76.75	
20	47	9	Luca Harrington	New Zealand	72.50	76.25	76.25	
21	51	17	Francisco Salas	Chile	67.75	67.25	67.75	
22	79	6	Cody Laplante	United States	63.75	63.25	63.75	
23	23	19	Colin Wili	Switzerland	58.75	54.00	58.75	
24	28	25	Samuel Baumgartner	Austria	38.50	25.25	38.50	
	40	12	Gus Kenworthy	Great Britain	Did not start			
	52	16	Aleksi Patja	Finland	Did not start			

== Final ==
The final was started on 16 March at 10:00.

Rank	Bib	Start order	Name	Country	Run 1	Run 2	Run 3	Total
1st place, gold medalist(s)	16	11	Oliwer Magnusson	Sweden	94.25	87.00	91.00	185.25
2nd place, silver medalist(s)	30	3	Édouard Therriault	Canada	89.50	85.50	93.50	183.00
3rd place, bronze medalist(s)	14	6	Kim Gubser	Switzerland	91.00	89.75	38.50	180.75
4	4	9	Mac Forehand	United States	88.00	21.75	92.00	180.00
5	13	8	Evan McEachran	Canada	78.50	88.25	90.50	178.75
6	1	7	Andri Ragettli	Switzerland	92.00	79.25	28.75	171.25
7	2	10	Alex Hall	United States	22.00	86.00	80.75	166.75
8	24	2	Sebastian Schjerve	Norway	52.25	87.25	77.00	164.25
9	53	1	Thibault Magnin	Spain	44.00	50.25	62.25	112.50
10	9	5	Jesper Tjäder	Sweden	85.00	23.25	25.00	110.00
11	6	4	Antoine Adelisse	France	25.00	24.50	93.25	93.25
	3	12	Birk Ruud	Norway	Did not start			
