= Freestyle skiing at the 2022 Winter Olympics – Men's slopestyle =

Men's slopestyle at the XXIV Olympic Winter Games
- Freestyle skiing
- Venue: Genting Snow Park, Zhangjiakou
- Date: 14, 16 February 2022
- Competitors: 29 from 11 nations
- Winning points: 90.01

Medalists
1st place, gold medalist(s)		Alex Hall	United States
2nd place, silver medalist(s)		Nick Goepper	United States
3rd place, bronze medalist(s)		Jesper Tjäder	Sweden

The men's slopestyle competition in freestyle skiing at the 2022 Winter Olympics was held on 14 February (qualification) and 16 February (final), at the Genting Snow Park in Zhangjiakou. Alex Hall of the United States won the event, which was his first Olympic medal. The 2018 silver medalist, Nick Goepper, also of the United States, won silver again. Jesper Tjäder of Sweden was third, also his first Olympic medal.

The 2018 champion is Øystein Bråten, but he stopped competing and was not available to defend the title. The bronze medalist, Alex Beaulieu-Marchand, did not qualify. At the 2021–22 FIS Freestyle Ski World Cup, there were only three races held before the Olympics, and Fabian Bösch was leading the rankings. Goepper is the 2021 X-Games winner, and Andri Ragettli is the 2021 world champion.

== Qualification ==
A total of 30 athletes qualified to compete at the games. For an athlete to compete they must have a minimum of 50.00 FIS points on the FIS Points List on January 17, 2022 and a top 30 finish in a World Cup event or at the FIS Freestyle Ski World Championships 2021 in either big air or slopestyle. A country could enter a maximum of four athletes into the event.

== Results ==
=== Qualification ===
Q — Qualified for the Final

The top 12 athletes in the qualifiers moved on to the medal round.

Rank	Bib	Order	Name	Country	Run 1	Run 2	Best	Notes
1	1	3	Andri Ragettli	Switzerland	76.98	85.08	85.08	Q
2	4	4	Birk Ruud	Norway	83.96	40.95	83.96	Q
3	9	13	Nick Goepper	United States	82.51	80.23	82.51	Q
4	8	9	Jesper Tjäder	Sweden	59.15	79.38	79.38	Q
5	6	17	Alex Hall	United States	79.13	40.60	79.13	Q
6	2	2	Colby Stevenson	United States	78.01	35.80	78.01	Q
7	21	21	Ben Barclay	New Zealand	76.00	77.71	77.71	Q
8	16	11	Kim Gubser	Switzerland	76.71	DNS	76.71	Q
9	27	18	Matěj Švancer	Austria	37.25	74.86	74.86	Q
10	5	5	Fabian Bösch	Switzerland	53.83	74.53	74.53	Q
11	12	26	Max Moffatt	Canada	74.06	35.06	74.06	Q
12	14	25	Oliwer Magnusson	Sweden	73.46	39.16	73.46	Q
13	15	6	Édouard Therriault	Canada	70.40	23.75	70.40	
14	20	23	Javier Lliso	Spain	21.95	69.16	69.16	
15	17	12	Finn Bilous	New Zealand	68.01	32.85	68.01	
16	7	29	Ferdinand Dahl	Norway	35.41	67.61	67.61	
17	28	28	Daniel Bacher	Austria	63.60	16.21	63.60	
18	29	24	Leonardo Donaggio	Italy	63.48	42.88	63.48	
19	22	19	Colin Wili	Switzerland	54.45	38.03	54.45	
20	3	1	Mac Forehand	United States	51.21	37.80	51.21	
21	18	27	Henrik Harlaut	Sweden	37.70	48.16	48.16	
22	31	16	He Jinbo	China	42.83	20.85	42.83	
23	11	15	Christian Nummedal	Norway	41.48	16.03	41.48	
24	13	22	Evan McEachran	Canada	40.90	33.70	40.90	
25	26	10	Tormod Frostad	Norway	22.11	38.05	38.05	
26	24	31	Teal Harle	Canada	36.05	33.81	36.05	
27	30	8	Simo Peltola	Finland	35.01	29.25	35.01	
28	23	20	Hugo Burvall	Sweden	33.40	28.58	33.40	
29	25	14	Thibault Magnin	Spain	33.06	14.78	33.06	
	10	7	James Woods	Great Britain	DNS			
	19	30	Antoine Adelisse	France	DNS			

=== Final ===
Rank	Bib	Order	Name	Country	Run 1	Run 2	Run 3	Best
1st place, gold medalist(s)	6	8	Alex Hall	United States	90.01	86.38	31.41	90.01
2nd place, silver medalist(s)	9	10	Nick Goepper	United States	45.75	86.48	53.45	86.48
3rd place, bronze medalist(s)	8	9	Jesper Tjäder	Sweden	85.35	16.11	37.33	85.35
4	1	12	Andri Ragettli	Switzerland	78.20	83.50	33.95	83.50
5	4	11	Birk Ruud	Norway	26.98	47.93	79.33	79.33
6	5	3	Fabian Bösch	Switzerland	78.05	51.46	13.98	78.05
7	2	7	Colby Stevenson	United States	77.41	41.73	55.18	77.41
8	27	4	Matěj Švancer	Austria	73.05	31.86	49.83	73.05
9	12	2	Max Moffatt	Canada	47.18	65.31	70.40	70.40
10	21	6	Ben Barclay	New Zealand	29.16	29.78	67.40	67.40
11	14	1	Oliwer Magnusson	Sweden	23.75	22.75	40.46	40.46
	16	5	Kim Gubser	Switzerland	DNS			
