= FIS Freestyle Ski and Snowboarding World Championships 2021 – Men's ski slopestyle =

Men's ski slopestyle at the FIS Freestyle Ski and Snowboarding World Championships 2021
- Venue: Aspen/Snowmass
- Location: Aspen, United States
- Date: 11 March (qualification); 13 March
- Competitors: 49 from 18 nations
- Winning points: 90.65

Medalists
| gold medal | Andri Ragettli | Switzerland |
| silver medal | Colby Stevenson | United States |
| bronze medal | Alex Hall | United States |

The Men's ski slopestyle competition at the FIS Freestyle Ski and Snowboarding World Championships 2021 was held on 13 March. A qualification was held on 11 March 2021.

== Qualification ==
The qualification was started on 11 March at 12:45. The six best skiers from each heat qualified for the final.

=== Heat 1 ===
| Rank | Bib | Start order | Name | Country | Run 1 | Run 2 | Best | Notes |
|---|---|---|---|---|---|---|---|---|
| 1 | 1 | 1 | Andri Ragettli | Switzerland | 90.25 | 91.00 | 91.00 | Q |
| 2 | 7 | 2 | Evan McEachran | Canada | 24.00 | 89.50 | 89.50 | Q |
| 3 | 4 | 5 | Birk Ruud | Norway | 54.50 | 88.50 | 88.50 | Q |
| 4 | 12 | 11 | Finn Bilous | New Zealand | 81.00 | 88.00 | 88.00 | Q |
| 5 | 17 | 25 | Oliwer Magnusson | Sweden | 87.50 | 37.75 | 87.50 | Q |
| 6 | 5 | 4 | Jesper Tjäder | Sweden | 72.75 | 86.50 | 86.50 | Q |
| 7 | 13 | 7 | Ferdinand Dahl | Norway | 65.00 | 86.00 | 86.00 | |
| 8 | 52 | 15 | Kuura Koivisto | Finland | 85.50 | 19.00 | 85.50 | |
| 9 | 21 | 20 | Taisei Yamamoto | Japan | 83.25 | 83.75 | 83.75 | |
| 10 | 30 | 8 | Lukas Müllauer | Austria | 77.00 | 82.25 | 82.25 | |
| 11 | 26 | 19 | Thibault Magnin | Spain | 80.50 | 46.00 | 80.50 | |
| 12 | 18 | 16 | Tyler Harding | Great Britain | 74.50 | 18.00 | 74.50 | |
| 13 | 25 | 22 | Ben Barclay | New Zealand | 31.50 | 71.50 | 71.50 | |
| 14 | 33 | 13 | Gen Fujii | Japan | 69.00 | 3.25 | 69.00 | |
| 15 | 43 | 6 | Simo Peltola | Finland | 63.50 | 36.50 | 63.50 | |
| 16 | 39 | 17 | Timothé Sivignon | France | 60.75 | 51.75 | 60.75 | |
| 17 | 22 | 12 | Édouard Therriault | Canada | 57.00 | 50.00 | 57.00 | |
| 18 | 46 | 14 | Vincent Maharavo | France | 50.00 | 55.75 | 55.75 | |
| 19 | 48 | 24 | Bailey Johnson | Australia | 51.25 | 7.50 | 51.25 | |
| 20 | 37 | 21 | David Zehentner | Germany | 37.50 | 47.00 | 47.00 | |
| 21 | 42 | 18 | Leonardo Donaggio | Italy | 42.00 | 14.00 | 42.00 | |
| 22 | 9 | 3 | Christian Nummedal | Norway | 34.00 | 10.25 | 34.00 | |
| 23 | 29 | 10 | Nils Rhyner | Switzerland | 14.00 | 31.25 | 31.25 | |
| 24 | 51 | 23 | Samuel Baumgartner | Austria | 19.25 | 30.75 | 30.75 | |
| | 34 | 9 | Gus Kenworthy | Great Britain | Did not start | | | |

=== Heat 2 ===
| Rank | Bib | Start order | Name | Country | Run 1 | Run 2 | Best | Notes |
|---|---|---|---|---|---|---|---|---|
| 1 | 20 | 6 | Alex Hall | United States | 92.25 | 60.25 | 92.25 | Q |
| 2 | 6 | 1 | James Woods | Great Britain | 66.25 | 91.25 | 91.25 | Q |
| 3 | 3 | 3 | Colby Stevenson | United States | 90.25 | 88.75 | 90.25 | Q |
| 4 | 11 | 9 | Antoine Adelisse | France | 87.75 | 9.25 | 87.75 | Q |
| 5 | 28 | 11 | Max Moffatt | Canada | 43.00 | 86.75 | 86.75 | Q |
| 6 | 14 | 15 | Kim Gubser | Switzerland | 86.00 | 37.75 | 86.00 | Q |
| 7 | 27 | 22 | Henrik Harlaut | Sweden | 25.00 | 85.25 | 85.25 | |
| 8 | 59 | 5 | Cody Laplante | United States | 71.75 | 84.50 | 84.50 | |
| 9 | 23 | 8 | Teal Harle | Canada | 83.25 | 33.25 | 83.25 | |
| 10 | 24 | 23 | Ralph Welponer | Italy | 52.00 | 80.00 | 80.00 | |
| 11 | 10 | 4 | Javier Lliso | Spain | 77.50 | 71.25 | 77.50 | |
| 12 | 36 | 20 | Chris McCormick | Great Britain | 13.00 | 70.50 | 70.50 | |
| 13 | 31 | 7 | Hannes Rudigier | Austria | 62.00 | 60.00 | 62.00 | |
| 14 | 44 | 10 | Vincent Veile | Germany | 33.75 | 60.25 | 60.25 | |
| 15 | 2 | 2 | Mac Forehand | United States | 58.75 | 28.25 | 58.75 | |
| 16 | 41 | 18 | Luca Harrington | New Zealand | 11.75 | 50.25 | 50.25 | |
| 17 | 60 | 25 | John Parker | Hong Kong | 10.75 | 49.75 | 49.75 | |
| 18 | 32 | 17 | Julius Forer | Austria | 44.50 | 34.00 | 44.50 | |
| 19 | 19 | 12 | Oscar Wester | Sweden | 26.50 | 40.50 | 40.50 | |
| 20 | 49 | 19 | Francisco Salas | Chile | 38.75 | 14.75 | 38.75 | |
| 21 | 16 | 13 | Sebastian Schjerve | Norway | 36.00 | 32.75 | 36.00 | |
| 22 | 45 | 14 | Mateo Bonacalza | Argentina | 31.75 | 23.00 | 31.75 | |
| 23 | 40 | 16 | Miika Virkki | Finland | 29.25 | 13.75 | 29.25 | |
| 24 | 50 | 21 | Aleksi Patja | Finland | 4.75 | 15.75 | 15.75 | |
| 25 | 35 | 24 | Harry Wright | Great Britain | 15.50 | 5.50 | 15.50 | |

== Final ==
The final was started on 13 March at 09:30.

| Rank | Bib | Start order | Name | Country | Run 1 | Run 2 | Run 3 | Best |
|---|---|---|---|---|---|---|---|---|
| 1st place, gold medalist(s) | 1 | 11 | Andri Ragettli | Switzerland | 72.38 | 85.43 | 90.65 | 90.65 |
| 2nd place, silver medalist(s) | 3 | 8 | Colby Stevenson | United States | 67.16 | 89.55 | 39.43 | 89.55 |
| 3rd place, bronze medalist(s) | 20 | 12 | Alex Hall | United States | 44.70 | 16.28 | 86.01 | 86.01 |
| 4 | 6 | 10 | James Woods | Great Britain | 84.76 | 79.90 | 53.31 | 84.76 |
| 5 | 14 | 1 | Kim Gubser | Switzerland | 46.61 | 81.78 | 50.55 | 81.78 |
| 6 | 17 | 4 | Oliwer Magnusson | Sweden | 69.55 | 57.41 | 81.63 | 81.63 |
| 7 | 4 | 7 | Birk Ruud | Norway | 81.46 | 33.96 | 25.81 | 81.46 |
| 8 | 7 | 9 | Evan McEachran | Canada | 74.61 | 20.30 | 12.30 | 74.61 |
| 9 | 12 | 6 | Finn Bilous | New Zealand | 65.03 | 73.23 | 30.11 | 73.23 |
| 10 | 5 | 2 | Jesper Tjäder | Sweden | 53.83 | 40.40 | 66.40 | 66.40 |
| 11 | 28 | 3 | Max Moffatt | Canada | 31.45 | 51.81 | 33.11 | 51.81 |
| 12 | 11 | 5 | Antoine Adelisse | France | 17.25 | 17.38 | 25.95 | 25.95 |
