= Freestyle skiing at the 2022 Winter Olympics – Men's big air =

Men's big air at the XXIV Olympic Winter Games
- Freestyle skiing
- Venue: Big Air Shougang, Beijing
- Date: 7, 9 February 2022
- Competitors: 31 from 13 nations
- Winning points: 187.75

Medalists
| 1st place, gold medalist(s) | | Birk Ruud | Norway |
| 2nd place, silver medalist(s) | | Colby Stevenson | United States |
| 3rd place, bronze medalist(s) | | Henrik Harlaut | Sweden |

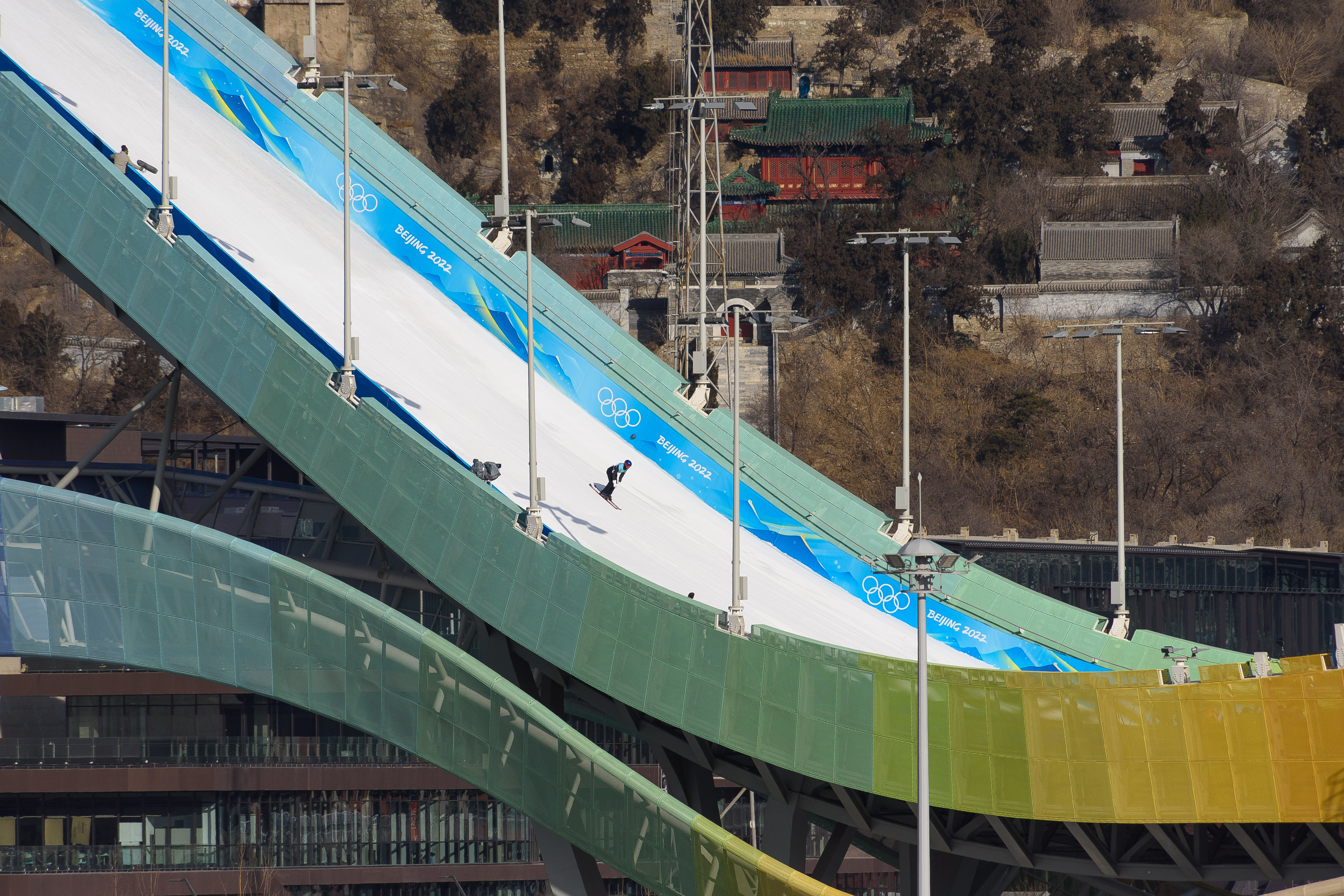
Gu Ailing Eileen on her first run at Women's Freeski Big Air Qualification

The men's big air competition in freestyle skiing at the 2022 Winter Olympics was held on 7 February (qualification) and 9 February (final), at the Big Air Shougang in Beijing. This was the inaugural freestyle skiing men's big air competition at the Olympics. Birk Ruud of Norway became the Olympic champion, Colby Stevenson of the United States won silver, and Henrik Harlaut of Sweden bronze. For each of them, this was the first Olympic medal.

At the 2021–22 FIS Freestyle Ski World Cup, only two big air events were held before the Olympics. Both were won by Matěj Švancer, who was followed by Alex Hall in the ranking. Oliwer Magnusson is the 2021 world champion. Andri Ragettli is the 2021 X-Games winner.

== Qualification ==
A total of 30 athletes qualified to compete at the games. For an athlete to compete they must have a minimum of 50.00 FIS points on the FIS Points List on 17 January 2022 and a top 30 finish in a World Cup event or at the FIS Freestyle Ski World Championships 2021 in either big air or slopestyle. A country could enter a maximum of four athletes into the event.

== Results ==
=== Qualification ===
| Rank | Bib | Order | Name | Country | Run 1 | Run 2 | Run 3 | Total | Notes |
|---|---|---|---|---|---|---|---|---|---|
| 1 | 5 | 4 | Birk Ruud | Norway | 94.50 | 50.50 | 93.25 | 187.75 | Q |
| 2 | 3 | 1 | Alex Hall | United States | 87.00 | 90.75 | 89.50 | 180.25 | Q |
| 3 | 8 | 7 | Oliwer Magnusson | Sweden | 88.00 | 89.25 | 84.00 | 177.25 | Q |
| 4 | 19 | 17 | Henrik Harlaut | Sweden | 93.00 | 83.50 | 42.00 | 176.50 | Q |
| 5 | 4 | 2 | Colby Stevenson | United States | 83.75 | 90.50 | 56.00 | 174.25 | Q |
| 6 | 17 | 29 | Christian Nummedal | Norway | 92.25 | 77.25 | 79.25 | 171.50 | Q |
| 7 | 24 | 22 | Tormod Frostad | Norway | 90.00 | 81.25 | 42.00 | 171.25 | Q |
| 8 | 6 | 25 | Mac Forehand | United States | 77.75 | 92.00 | 79.00 | 171.00 | Q |
| 9 | 25 | 26 | Javier Lliso | Spain | 90.25 | 80.50 | 79.50 | 170.75 | Q |
| 10 | 30 | 16 | Leonardo Donaggio | Italy | 90.25 | 70.25 | 80.25 | 170.50 | Q |
| 11 | 20 | 30 | Evan McEachran | Canada | 81.75 | 88.50 | 39.75 | 170.25 | Q |
| 12 | 13 | 24 | Jesper Tjäder | Sweden | 34.75 | 91.75 | 78.25 | 170.00 | Q |
| 13 | 15 | 21 | Édouard Therriault | Canada | 83.50 | 42.00 | 84.50 | 168.00 | |
| 14 | 2 | 3 | Andri Ragettli | Switzerland | 89.75 | 78.00 | 20.75 | 167.75 | |
| 15 | 7 | 14 | Antoine Adelisse | France | 79.50 | 66.00 | 83.75 | 163.25 | |
| 16 | 23 | 12 | Ben Barclay | New Zealand | 81.00 | 78.25 | 84.50 | 162.75 | |
| 17 | 9 | 18 | Fabian Bösch | Switzerland | 81.00 | 80.75 | 22.50 | 161.75 | |
| 18 | 21 | 10 | Finn Bilous | New Zealand | 73.75 | 68.75 | 82.00 | 155.75 | |
| 19 | 12 | 31 | Ferdinand Dahl | Norway | 12.00 | 72.50 | 77.50 | 150.00 | |
| 20 | 18 | 13 | Max Moffatt | Canada | 83.00 | 64.00 | 61.00 | 147.00 | |
| 21 | 29 | 19 | Daniel Bacher | Austria | 75.00 | 56.75 | 69.00 | 144.00 | |
| 22 | 14 | 15 | Nick Goepper | United States | 78.25 | 49.50 | 21.75 | 127.75 | |
| 23 | 11 | 9 | Kim Gubser | Switzerland | 15.25 | 79.75 | 41.50 | 121.25 | |
| 24 | 27 | 6 | Hugo Burvall | Sweden | 47.25 | 55.25 | 46.00 | 101.25 | |
| 25 | 26 | 8 | Colin Wili | Switzerland | 77.50 | 18.75 | 20.75 | 98.25 | |
| 26 | 1 | 5 | Matěj Švancer | Austria | 61.75 | 27.75 | 25.50 | 89.50 | |
| 27 | 31 | 20 | He Jinbo | China | 45.25 | 36.75 | 49.00 | 85.75 | |
| 28 | 22 | 28 | Thibault Magnin | Spain | 41.25 | 21.75 | 38.50 | 79.75 | |
| 29 | 28 | 11 | Simo Peltola | Finland | 49.75 | 41.75 | 72.00 | 72.00 | |
| 30 | 16 | 27 | James Woods | Great Britain | 27.50 | 26.50 | 32.25 | 59.75 | |
| 31 | 10 | 23 | Teal Harle | Canada | 26.50 | 24.25 | 20.25 | 46.75 | |

=== Final ===
| Rank | Bib | Order | Name | Country | Run 1 | Run 2 | Run 3 | Total |
|---|---|---|---|---|---|---|---|---|
| 1st place, gold medalist(s) | 5 | 12 | Birk Ruud | Norway | 95.75 | 92.00 | 69.00 | 187.75 |
| 2nd place, silver medalist(s) | 4 | 8 | Colby Stevenson | United States | 34.75 | 91.75 | 91.25 | 183.00 |
| 3rd place, bronze medalist(s) | 19 | 9 | Henrik Harlaut | Sweden | 86.00 | 90.00 | 91.00 | 181.00 |
| 4 | 8 | 10 | Oliwer Magnusson | Sweden | 87.50 | 79.00 | 90.75 | 178.25 |
| 5 | 30 | 3 | Leonardo Donaggio | Italy | 91.00 | 81.00 | 17.25 | 172.00 |
| 6 | 25 | 4 | Javier Lliso | Spain | 51.25 | 89.00 | 82.50 | 171.50 |
| 7 | 13 | 1 | Jesper Tjäder | Sweden | 77.25 | 78.25 | 92.00 | 170.25 |
| 8 | 3 | 11 | Alex Hall | United States | 68.25 | 92.50 | 27.00 | 160.75 |
| 9 | 20 | 2 | Evan McEachran | Canada | 93.00 | 22.50 | 11.50 | 115.50 |
| 10 | 17 | 7 | Christian Nummedal | Norway | 26.00 | 93.00 | 17.50 | 110.50 |
| 11 | 6 | 5 | Mac Forehand | United States | 60.75 | 19.50 | 42.00 | 80.25 |
| 12 | 24 | 6 | Tormod Frostad | Norway | 25.50 | 14.00 | 33.00 | 58.50 |
