= FIS Freestyle Ski and Snowboarding World Championships 2019 – Men's ski big air =

Men's ski big air at the FIS Freestyle Ski and Snowboarding World Championships 2019
- Venue: Park City Mountain Resort
- Location: Utah, United States
- Dates: February 2
- Competitors: 45 from 22 nations
- Winning points: 186.00

Medalists
gold medal	Fabian Bösch	Switzerland
silver medal	Henrik Harlaut	Sweden
bronze medal	Alex Beaulieu-Marchand	Canada

The Men's ski big air competition at the FIS Freestyle Ski and Snowboarding World Championships 2019 was held on February 2, 2019.

== Qualification ==
=== Heat 1 ===
The qualification heat 1 was started at 12:00.

Rank	Order	Name	Country	Run 1	Run 2	Best	Notes
1	10	Oliwer Magnusson	Sweden	79.75	93.25	93.25	Q
2	16	Fabian Bösch	Switzerland	22.00	93.00	93.00	Q
3	22	Evan McEachran	Canada	92.50	87.00	92.50	Q
4	20	Alex Beaulieu-Marchand	Canada	90.75	92.00	92.00	Q
5	19	Øystein Bråten	Norway	87.25	91.50	91.50	Q
6	18	Kim Gubser	Switzerland	89.75	69.75	89.75	
7	7	Oscar Wester	Sweden	23.25	88.50	88.50	
8	13	Philippe Langevin	Canada	57.25	88.00	88.00	
9	4	Elias Syrja	Finland	73.75	86.00	86.00	
10	11	McRae Williams	United States	63.00	85.00	85.00	
11	6	Ferdinand Dahl	Norway	82.75	84.25	84.25	
12	21	Benoît Buratti	France	81.50	80.25	81.50	
13	5	Vincent Veile	Germany	49.25	80.50	80.50	
14	23	Paul Vieuxtemps	Thailand	15.25	80.00	80.00	
15	8	Vincent Maharavo	France	76.25	77.75	77.75	
16	2	Benjamin Garces	Chile	44.50	68.75	68.75	
17	3	Mees van Lierop	Netherlands	70.50	60.75	60.75	
18	1	Vojtěch Břeský	Czech Republic	52.75	17.25	52.75	
19	9	Rasmus Dalberg Jørgensen	Denmark	10.50	47.50	47.50	
20	15	Mateo Bonacalza	Argentina	5.00	45.75	45.75	
21	14	Chris McCormick	Great Britain	42.00	14.00	42.00	
22	17	John Brown	Ireland	31.00	19.75	31.00	
23	12	James Woods	Great Britain	30.25	29.50	30.25	

=== Heat 2 ===
The qualification heat 2 was started at 14:15.

Rank	Order	Name	Country	Run 1	Run 2	Best	Notes
1	5	Nicholas Goepper	United States	94.75	87.25	94.75	Q
2	8	Jesper Tjäder	Sweden	26.50	94.50	94.50	Q
3	1	Henrik Harlaut	Sweden	85.50	94.25	94.25	Q
4	4	Alex Hall	United States	93.75	54.50	93.75	Q
5	9	Finn Bilous	New Zealand	92.75	93.50	93.50	Q
6	2	Kai Mahler	Switzerland	38.50	93.25	93.25	
7	3	Birk Ruud	Norway	90.75	72.50	90.75	
8	15	William Borm	United States	90.00	90.00	90.00	
9	19	Sebastian Schjerve	Norway	72.25	89.50	89.50	
10	7	Jonas Hunziker	Switzerland	89.25	78.00	89.25	
11	12	Florian Preuß	Germany	88.00	79.25	88.00	
12	6	Teal Harle	Canada	87.25	71.25	87.25	
13	10	Antoine Adelisse	France	81.75	24.75	81.75	
14	22	Taisei Yamamoto	Japan	54.00	74.00	74.00	
15	20	Lukas Müllauer	Austria	65.50	72.75	72.75	
16	16	Victor White	Barbados	69.00	70.50	70.50	
17	18	Jacob Tapper-Norris	New Zealand	64.75	61.25	64.75	
18	24	Dmitrii Makarov	Russia	56.00	64.50	64.50	
19	13	Samuel Baumgartner	Austria	64.25	35.75	64.25	
20	17	Šimon Bartik	Czech Republic	63.00	43.25	63.00	
21	11	Nahuel Medrano	Argentina	58.75	61.50	61.50	
22	14	Javier Lliso	Spain	23.00	26.00	26.00	
—	23	Thibault Magnin	Spain	Did not start			
—	21	Peter Lengyel	Slovakia	Did not start			

== Final ==
The final was started at 19:00. The best two runs counted for the total score.

Rank	Name	Country	Run 1	Run 2	Run 3	Total	Notes
1st place, gold medalist(s)	Fabian Bösch	Switzerland	90.00	96.00	87.75	186.00	
2nd place, silver medalist(s)	Henrik Harlaut	Sweden	92.25	18.75	91.75	184.00	
3rd place, bronze medalist(s)	Alex Beaulieu-Marchand	Canada	91.25	92.00	29.00	183.25	
4	Alex Hall	United States	89.50	89.75	90.75	180.50	
5	Finn Bilous	New Zealand	91.00	88.75	68.75	179.75	
6	Oliwer Magnusson	Sweden	86.00	74.50	85.00	171.00	
7	Jesper Tjader	Sweden	70.00	17.25	82.75	152.75	
8	Øystein Bråten	Norway	84.75	89.00	20.00	109.00	
9	Evan McEachran	Canada	28.50	35.00	70.50	105.50	
10	Nicholas Goepper	United States	43.00	21.50	24.25	43.00	
