= FIS Freestyle Ski and Snowboarding World Championships 2023 – Men's ski slopestyle =

Men's ski slopestyle at the FIS Freestyle Ski and Snowboarding World Championships 2023
- Location: Bakuriani, Georgia
- Dates: 26 February (qualification); 28 February
- Competitors: 47 from 20 nations
- Winning points: 90.75

Medalists
gold medal	Birk Ruud	Norway
silver medal	Christian Nummedal	Norway
bronze medal	Andri Ragettli	Switzerland

The Men's ski slopestyle competition at the FIS Freestyle Ski and Snowboarding World Championships 2023 was held on 26 and 28 February 2023.

== Qualification ==
The qualification was started on 26 February at 14:00. The eight best skiers from each heat qualified for the final.

=== Heat 1 ===
Rank	Bib	Start order	Name	Country	Run 1	Run 2	Best	Notes
1	1	5	Birk Ruud	Norway	78.50	91.50	91.50	Q
2	8	8	Evan McEachran	Canada	9.00	84.75	84.75	Q
3	16	1	Noah Porter MacLennan	Canada	82.00	11.75	82.00	Q
4	9	9	Fabian Bösch	Switzerland	80.25	80.75	80.75	Q
5	12	2	Hugo Burvall	Sweden	52.00	74.00	74.00	Q
6	18	7	Tormod Frostad	Norway	71.75	42.00	71.75	Q
7	22	17	Valentin Morel	Switzerland	50.00	70.50	70.50	Q
8	5	4	Jesper Tjäder	Sweden	67.00	68.50	68.50	Q
9	34	25	Kuura Koivisto	Finland	29.75	66.75	66.75	
10	26	15	Luca Harrington	New Zealand	38.00	66.00	66.00	
11	33	20	Teemu Lauronen	Finland	24.50	65.00	65.00	
12	4	6	Mac Forehand	United States	23.50	64.25	64.25	
13	13	10	Oliwer Magnusson	Sweden	60.75	61.25	61.25	
14	41	16	Rai Kasamura	Japan	47.25	17.75	47.25	
15	37	19	Miro Tabanelli	Italy	46.25	12.75	46.25	
16	21	3	Chris McCormick	Great Britain	45.50	20.50	45.50	
17	38	22	Rene Monteleone	Italy	44.75	44.25	44.75	
18	25	13	Troy Podmilsak	United States	44.00	14.50	44.00	
19	42	21	Michael Oravec	Slovakia	43.25	14.00	43.25	
20	50	11	Nika Eloshvili	Georgia	42.50	16.00	42.50	
21	46	23	Moritz Happacher	Italy	36.00	40.00	40.00	
22	49	14	Yoon Jong-hyun	South Korea	31.50	8.50	31.50	
23	30	24	Gen Fujii	Japan	25.50	31.00	31.00	
24	29	18	Lukas Müllauer	Austria	12.25	DNS	12.25	
	45	12	He Jinbo	China	Did not start			

=== Heat 2 ===
Rank	Bib	Start order	Name	Country	Run 1	Run 2	Best	Notes
1	2	7	Andri Ragettli	Switzerland	88.00	91.00	91.00	Q
2	6	5	Sebastian Schjerve	Norway	38.00	90.00	90.00	Q
3	14	8	Cody Laplante	United States	82.50	31.00	82.50	Q
4	10	9	Hunter Henderson	United States	78.75	43.00	78.75	Q
5	15	4	Ben Barclay	New Zealand	76.50	36.50	76.50	Q
6	11	10	Christian Nummedal	Norway	34.50	75.75	75.75	Q
7	3	6	Max Moffatt	Canada	48.00	75.00	75.00	Q
8	40	23	Elias Syrjä	Finland	65.00	74.50	74.50	Q
9	27	21	Kim Gubser	Switzerland	73.75	55.00	73.75	
10	7	2	Matěj Švancer	Austria	70.75	23.25	70.75	
11	23	11	Thibault Magnin	Spain	23.00	68.75	68.75	
12	28	16	Oliver Movenius	Sweden	66.25	4.25	66.25	
13	43	12	Orest Kovalenko	Ukraine	11.00	64.25	64.25	
14	39	14	Simo Peltola	Finland	63.25	37.00	63.25	
15	36	24	Kaditane Gomis	France	51.75	42.00	51.75	
16	20	1	Colin Wili	Switzerland	44.25	50.50	50.50	
17	51	20	Luka Chopikashvili	Georgia	36.00	42.00	42.00	
18	48	15	Georgios Almpanidis	Greece	29.75	13.50	29.75	
19	31	13	Timothé Sivignon	France	14.00	27.75	27.75	
20	24	18	Tyler Harding	Great Britain	16.50	15.00	16.50	
21	44	22	Štěpán Hudeček	Czech Republic	8.75	1.25	8.75	
22	47	19	Jošt Klančar	Slovenia	3.75	7.25	7.25	
23	19	3	Antoine Adelisse	France	5.75	DNS	5.75	
	35	25	Alexis Ghisleni	France	Did not start			
	32	17	Axel Burmansson	Sweden	Did not start			

== Final ==
The final was started on 28 February at 13:30.

Rank	Bib	Start order	Name	Country	Run 1	Run 2	Best
1st place, gold medalist(s)	1	16	Birk Ruud	Norway	82.21	90.75	90.75
2nd place, silver medalist(s)	11	6	Christian Nummedal	Norway	25.95	87.08	87.08
3rd place, bronze medalist(s)	2	15	Andri Ragettli	Switzerland	84.33	36.81	84.33
4	3	4	Max Moffatt	Canada	82.80	67.71	82.80
5	6	14	Sebastian Schjerve	Norway	43.56	81.85	81.85
6	10	9	Hunter Henderson	United States	36.18	81.45	81.45
7	8	13	Evan McEachran	Canada	34.05	81.28	81.28
8	9	10	Fabian Bösch	Switzerland	81.10	64.40	81.10
9	15	8	Ben Barclay	New Zealand	75.30	80.33	80.33
10	16	11	Noah Porter MacLennan	Canada	71.86	25.95	71.86
11	40	2	Elias Syrjä	Finland	43.00	61.98	61.98
12	22	3	Valentin Morel	Switzerland	46.83	61.15	61.15
13	14	12	Cody Laplante	United States	59.66	25.88	59.66
14	5	1	Jesper Tjäder	Sweden	19.65	38.95	38.95
15	18	5	Tormod Frostad	Norway	35.05	27.81	35.05
16	12	7	Hugo Burvall	Sweden	21.75	11.95	21.75
