= Sweden at the 2022 Winter Olympics =

- Flag of Sweden
- IOC code: SWE
- NOC: Swedish Olympic Committee
- Website: www.sok.se (in Swedish)

in Beijing, China 4–20 February 2022
- Competitors: 116 (62 men and 54 women) in 11 sports
- Flag bearers (opening): Oliwer Magnusson; Emma Nordin
- Flag bearer (closing): Elvira Öberg
- Medals Ranked 5th: Gold 8 Silver 5 Bronze 5 Total 18

Winter Olympics appearances (overview)
- 1924; 1928; 1932; 1936; 1948; 1952; 1956; 1960; 1964; 1968; 1972; 1976; 1980; 1984; 1988; 1992; 1994; 1998; 2002; 2006; 2010; 2014; 2018; 2022; 2026

Sweden competed at the 2022 Winter Olympics in Beijing, China, from 4 to 20 February 2022.

Oliwer Magnusson and Emma Nordin were the country's flagbearers during the opening ceremony. Meanwhile, biathlete Elvira Öberg was the flagbearer during the closing ceremony.

With eight gold medals and 18 medals in total, this was Sweden's most successful Winter Olympics of all time in terms of both gold and total medals, beating the previous records set in 2018 and 2014, respectively. It marked the first time Sweden won medals in six different sports at the Winter Games, and they managed to win gold medals in these sports. Additionally, the country won its first (and second) gold medal in freestyle skiing, first gold medals in speed skating since 1988, and became the first country to win medals in all three events in curling at the same Winter Olympics.

== Medalists ==
The following Swedish competitors won medals at the Games. In the discipline sections below, the medalists' names are bolded.

Medal	Name	Sport	Event	Date
Gold	Walter Wallberg	Freestyle skiing	Men's moguls	5 February
Gold	Nils van der Poel	Speed skating	Men's 5000 m	6 February
Gold	Sara Hector	Alpine skiing	Women's giant slalom	7 February
Gold	Jonna Sundling	Cross-country skiing	Women's sprint	8 February
Gold	Nils van der Poel	Speed skating	Men's 10 000 m	11 February
Gold	Linn Persson; Mona Brorsson; Hanna Öberg; Elvira Öberg	Biathlon	Women's relay	16 February
Gold	Sandra Näslund	Freestyle skiing	Women's ski cross	17 February
Gold	Niklas Edin; Oskar Eriksson; Rasmus Wranå; Christoffer Sundgren; Daniel Magnusson	Curling	Men's tournament	19 February
Silver	Maja Dahlqvist	Cross-country skiing	Women's sprint	8 February
Silver	Elvira Öberg	Biathlon	Women's sprint	11 February
Silver	Elvira Öberg	Biathlon	Women's pursuit	13 February
Silver	Maja Dahlqvist; Jonna Sundling	Cross-country skiing	Women's team sprint	16 February
Silver	Martin Ponsiluoma	Biathlon	Men's mass start	18 February
Bronze	Oskar Eriksson; Almida de Val	Curling	Mixed doubles	8 February
Bronze	Henrik Harlaut	Freestyle skiing	Men's big air	9 February
Bronze	Maja Dahlqvist; Ebba Andersson; Frida Karlsson; Jonna Sundling	Cross-country skiing	Women's 4 × 5 km relay	12 February
Bronze	Jesper Tjäder	Freestyle skiing	Men's slopestyle	16 February
Bronze	Anna Hasselborg; Sara McManus; Agnes Knochenhauer; Sofia Mabergs; Johanna Heldin	Curling	Women's tournament	19 February

Medals by sport
**Sport**	1st place, gold medalist(s)	2nd place, silver medalist(s)	3rd place, bronze medalist(s)	Total
Freestyle skiing	2	0	2	4
Speed skating	2	0	0	2
Biathlon	1	3	0	4
Cross-country skiing	1	2	1	4
Curling	1	0	2	3
Alpine skiing	1	0	0	1
Total	8	5	5	18

Medals by date
**Day**	**Date**	1st place, gold medalist(s)	2nd place, silver medalist(s)	3rd place, bronze medalist(s)	Total
Day 2	5 February	1	0	0	1
Day 3	6 February	1	0	0	1
Day 4	7 February	1	0	0	1
Day 5	8 February	1	1	1	3
Day 6	9 February	0	0	1	1
Day 7	10 February	0	0	0	0
Day 8	11 February	1	1	0	2
Day 9	12 February	0	0	1	1
Day 10	13 February	0	1	0	1
Day 11	14 February	0	0	0	0
Day 12	15 February	0	0	0	0
Day 13	16 February	1	1	1	3
Day 14	17 February	1	0	0	1
Day 15	18 February	0	1	0	1
Day 16	19 February	1	0	1	2
Day 17	20 February	0	0	0	0
Total		8	5	5	18

Medals by gender
**Gender**	1st place, gold medalist(s)	2nd place, silver medalist(s)	3rd place, bronze medalist(s)	**Total**
Male	4	1	2	**7**
Female	4	4	2	**10**
Mixed	0	0	1	**1**
Total	8	5	5	18

Multiple medalists
**Name**	**Sport**	1st place, gold medalist(s)	2nd place, silver medalist(s)	3rd place, bronze medalist(s)	Total
Nils van der Poel	Speed skating	2	0	0	2
Elvira Öberg	Biathlon	1	2	0	3
Jonna Sundling	Cross-country skiing	1	1	1	3
Oskar Eriksson	Curling	1	0	1	2
Maja Dahlqvist	Cross-country skiing	0	2	1	3

== Competitors ==
The following is the list of number of competitors participating at the Games per sport/discipline.

Sport	Men	Women	Total
Alpine skiing	2	6	8
Biathlon	5	6	11
Cross-country skiing	8	8	16
Curling	5	6	11
Figure skating	1	1	2
Freestyle skiing	12	2	14
Ice hockey	25	23	48
Luge	1	1	2
Ski jumping	0	1	1
Snowboarding	2	0	2
Speed skating	1	0	1
Total	62	54	116

Oskar Eriksson was selected in both the men's and mixed team events in curling.

== Alpine skiing ==
SOC selected Hanna Aronsson Elfman, Elsa Fermbäck, Kristoffer Jakobsen, Sara Hector, Hilma Lövblom, Mattias Rönngren, Anna Swenn-Larsson and Charlotta Säfvenberg.

Men

Athlete	Event	Run 1		Run 2		Total	
Athlete	Event	Time	Rank	Time	Rank	Time	Rank
Kristoffer Jakobsen	Slalom	DNF		Did not advance			
Mattias Rönngren	Giant slalom	1:04.48	13	DNF			

Women

Athlete	Event	Run 1		Run 2		Total	
Athlete	Event	Time	Rank	Time	Rank	Time	Rank
Hanna Aronsson Elfman	Giant slalom	1:00.19	22	DNF			
Sara Hector	Giant slalom	57.56	1	58.13	8	1:55.69	1st place, gold medalist(s)
Hilma Lövblom	Giant slalom	1:01.18	27	DNF			
Elsa Fermbäck	Slalom	55.26	28	54.07	27	1:49.33	28
Sara Hector	Slalom	52.29	3	DNF			
Charlotta Säfvenberg	Slalom	55.25	27	53.45	21	1:48.70	24
Anna Swenn-Larsson	Slalom	53.44	11	52.87	6	1:46.31	9

Mixed

Athlete	Event	Round of 16	Quarterfinals	Semifinals	Final / BM	
Athlete	Event	Opposition Result	Opposition Result	Opposition Result	Opposition Result	Rank
Hilma Lövblom; Kristoffer Jakobsen; Mattias Rönngren; Hanna Aronsson Elfman	Team	Germany; L 1–3	Did not advance			13

== Biathlon ==
Sweden qualified five men and six women in biathlon. SOC used all quotas and selected the nine athletes listed below as well as Stina Nilsson and Malte Stefansson who did not start in any events.

Men

Athlete	Event	Time	Misses	Rank
Peppe Femling	Individual	53:43.6	2 (1+0+0+1)	40
Peppe Femling	Sprint	26:58.5	3 (2+1)	64
Jesper Nelin	Individual	55:49.7	5 (0+2+0+3)	64
Jesper Nelin	Sprint	26:43.6	4 (3+1)	55
Jesper Nelin	Pursuit	44:02.3	4 (1+0+1+2)	31
Martin Ponsiluoma	Individual	51:16.8	3 (2+0+0+1)	12
Martin Ponsiluoma	Sprint	24:54.1	2 (0+2)	6
Martin Ponsiluoma	Pursuit	42:27.0	9 (2+3+4+0)	11
Martin Ponsiluoma	Mass start	38:54.7	2 (1+0+0+1)	2nd place, silver medalist(s)
Sebastian Samuelsson	Individual	52:51.7	3 (1+1+1+0)	30
Sebastian Samuelsson	Sprint	24:52.4	1 (1+0)	5
Sebastian Samuelsson	Pursuit	42:10.2	5 (1+2+2+0)	8
Sebastian Samuelsson	Mass start	41:01.0	4 (0+0+1+3)	11
Peppe Femling; Jesper Nelin; Martin Ponsiluoma; Sebastian Samuelsson	Team relay	1:21:39.6	1+13 (1+7 0+6)	5

Women

Athlete	Event	Time	Misses	Rank
Mona Brorsson	Individual	45:43.1	1 (1+0+0+0)	12
Mona Brorsson	Mass start	43:37.4	6 (2+1+2+1)	21
Anna Magnusson	Sprint	21:50.2	0 (0+0)	7
Anna Magnusson	Pursuit	40:59.9	6 (1+3+0+2)	46
Linn Persson	Individual	46:22.3	2 (0+0+1+1)	15
Linn Persson	Sprint	21:50.2	1 (0+1)	12
Linn Persson	Pursuit	36:54.1	2 (0+0+1+1)	5
Linn Persson	Mass start	43:46.6	8 (0+2+3+3)	24
Elvira Öberg	Individual	45:55.2	3 (0+1+2+0)	13
Elvira Öberg	Sprint	38:54.7	2 (1+0+0+1)	2nd place, silver medalist(s)
Elvira Öberg	Pursuit	36:23.4	3 (0+1+2+0)	2nd place, silver medalist(s)
Elvira Öberg	Mass start	41:55.7	4 (1+0+0+3)	9
Hanna Öberg	Individual	46:35.8	3 (0+2+0+1)	16
Hanna Öberg	Sprint	22:19.1	3 (1+2)	19
Hanna Öberg	Pursuit	38:11.3	6 (1+0+3+2)	18
Hanna Öberg	Mass start	44:03.2	7 (0+3+1+3)	25
Linn Persson; Mona Brorsson; Hanna Öberg; Elvira Öberg	Team relay	1:11:03.9	0+6 (0+1 0+5)	1st place, gold medalist(s)

Mixed

Athlete	Event	Time	Misses	Rank
Hanna Öberg; Elvira Öberg; Martin Ponsiluoma; Sebastian Samuelsson	Relay	1:07:26.6	0+13 (0+7 0+6)	4

== Cross-country skiing ==
Sweden qualified 16 athletes (8 men and 8 women) and four teams in cross-country skiing. The following athletes were selected by the SOC:

Distance
Men

Athlete	Event	Classical		Freestyle		Total		
Athlete	Event	Time	Rank	Time	Rank	Time	Deficit	Rank
Jens Burman	15 km classical	—N/a				39:26.8	+1:32.0	8
Jens Burman	30 km skiathlon	41:20.0	23	39:50.4	25	1:21:43.3	+5:33.5	24
Jens Burman	50 km freestyle	—N/a				1:14:22.3	+2:49.6	16
Calle Halfvarsson	15 km classical	—N/a				40:46.8	+2:52.0	26
Calle Halfvarsson	30 km skiathlon	41:18.8	21	41:03.0	=34	1:22:56.3	+6:46.5	30
Calle Halfvarsson	50 km freestyle	—N/a				1:16:47.6	+5:14.9	38
Johan Häggström	15 km classical	—N/a				40:30.9	+2:36.1	21
Leo Johansson	30 km skiathlon	43:21.9	46	41:03.0	=34	1:24:59.6	+8:49.8	37
Leo Johansson	50 km freestyle	—N/a				1:17:16.5	+5:43.8	39
William Poromaa	15 km classical	—N/a				39:42.5	+1:47.7	10
William Poromaa	30 km skiathlon	40:13.9	8	38:18.3	3	1:19:03.7	+2:53.9	6
William Poromaa	50 km freestyle	—N/a				1:12:29.1	+56.4	9
Oskar Svensson; William Poromaa; Jens Burman; Johan Häggström	4 × 10 km relay	—N/a				1:57:00.4	+2:09.7	4

Women

Athlete	Event	Classical		Freestyle		Total		
Athlete	Event	Time	Rank	Time	Rank	Time	Deficit	Rank
Ebba Andersson	10 km classical	—N/a				28:57.2	+50.9	6
Ebba Andersson	15 km skiathlon	22:40.5	6	22:24.3	11	45:41.3	+1:27.6	10
Ebba Andersson	30 km freestyle	—N/a				1:27:35.5	+2:41.5	8
Charlotte Kalla	10 km classical	—N/a				30:07.6	+2:01.3	20
Charlotte Kalla	15 km skiathlon	24:21.9	23	22:52.7	17	47:53.8	+3:40.1	19
Charlotte Kalla	30 km freestyle	—N/a				1:34:45.4	+9:51.4	35
Frida Karlsson	10 km classical	—N/a				2 29:28.0	+1:21.7	12
Frida Karlsson	15 km skiathlon	22:32.4	3	21:47.2	8	44:56.2	+42.5	5
Moa Olsson	15 km skiathlon	25:05.0	39	24:31.2	49	50:12.8	+5:59.1	45
Emma Ribom	10 km classical	—N/a				30:05.8	+1:59.5	19
Emma Ribom	30 km freestyle	—N/a				1:32:27.8	+7:33.8	29
Jonna Sundling	30 km freestyle	—N/a				1:27:29.4	+2:35.4	4
Maja Dahlqvist; Ebba Andersson; Frida Karlsson; Jonna Sundling	4 × 5 km relay	—N/a				54:01.7	+20.7	3rd place, bronze medalist(s)

Sprint
Men

Athlete	Event	Qualification		Quarterfinal		Semifinal		Final	
Athlete	Event	Time	Rank	Time	Rank	Time	Rank	Time	Rank
Marcus Grate	Sprint	2:52.14	18 Q	2:53.71	3	Did not advance			16
Johan Häggström	Sprint	2:50.61	8 Q	2:58.01	3	Did not advance			13
Anton Persson	Sprint	2:53.71	27 Q	2:53.35	5	Did not advance			24
Oskar Svensson	Sprint	2:52.07	17 Q	2:52.26	3 q	2:51.22	3 q	3:04.23	6
William Poromaa; Oskar Svensson	Team sprint	—N/a				20:07.57	2 Q	19:38.05	4

Women

Athlete	Event	Qualification		Quarterfinal		Semifinal		Final	
Athlete	Event	Time	Rank	Time	Rank	Time	Rank	Time	Rank
Maja Dahlqvist	Sprint	3:18.05	6 Q	3:21.03	1 Q	3:12.94	3 q	3:12.56	2nd place, silver medalist(s)
Anna Dyvik	Sprint	3:19.15	9 Q	3:19.00	4	Did not advance			17
Emma Ribom	Sprint	3:19.99	11 Q	3:18.44	2 Q	3:15.22	1 Q	3:20.79	6
Jonna Sundling	Sprint	3:09.03	1 Q	3:15.48	1 Q	3:11.94	1 Q	3:09.68	1st place, gold medalist(s)
Maja Dahlqvist; Jonna Sundling	Team sprint	—N/a				23:01.40	3 Q	22:10.02	2nd place, silver medalist(s)

Johanna Hagström was reserve at home for women's sprint. Linn Svahn was originally selected as well but was deselected due to injury.

== Curling ==
Summary

Team	Event	Group stage										Semifinal	Final / BM	
Team	Event	Opposition Score	Opposition Score	Opposition Score	Opposition Score	Opposition Score	Opposition Score	Opposition Score	Opposition Score	Opposition Score	Rank	Opposition Score	Opposition Score	Rank
Niklas Edin; Oskar Eriksson; Rasmus Wranå; Christoffer Sundgren; Daniel Magnusson	Men's tournament	CHN; W 6–4	USA; W 7–4	ITA; W 9–3	CAN; W 7–4	NOR; W 6–4	ROC; W 7–5	DEN; W 8–3	GBR; L 6–7	SUI; L 8–10	2 Q	CAN; W 5–3	GBR; W 5–4	1st place, gold medalist(s)
Anna Hasselborg; Sara McManus; Agnes Knochenhauer; Sofia Mabergs; Johanna Heldin	Women's tournament	JPN; W 8–5	GBR; L 2–8	CAN; W 7–6	CHN; L 6–9	USA; W 10–4	SUI; W 6–5	DEN; W 9–3	ROC; W 8–5	KOR; W 8–4	2 Q	GBR; L 11–12	SUI; W 9–7	3rd place, bronze medalist(s)
Almida de Val; Oskar Eriksson	Mixed doubles tournament	GBR; L 5–9	CZE; W 7–4	CHN; W 7–6	AUS; W 7–6	USA; L 7–8	SUI; W 6–1	CAN; W 6–2	NOR; L 2–6	ITA; L 8–12	4 Q	ITA; L 1–8	GBR; W 9–3	3rd place, bronze medalist(s)

=== Men's tournament ===
Sweden has qualified their men's team (five athletes), by finishing in the top six teams in the 2021 World Men's Curling Championship. On 4 June 2021, the Swedish Olympic Committee announced that Team Niklas Edin would be their men's team representatives.

Final Round Robin Standings
Team	Skip	Pld	W	L	W–L	PF	PA	EW	EL	BE	SE	S%	DSC	Qualification
Great Britain	Bruce Mouat	9	8	1	–	63	44	39	31	5	10	88.0%	18.81	Playoffs
Sweden	Niklas Edin	9	7	2	–	64	44	43	30	10	11	85.7%	14.02	Playoffs
Canada	Brad Gushue	9	5	4	1–0	58	50	34	38	7	7	84.4%	26.49	Playoffs
United States	John Shuster	9	5	4	0–1	56	61	35	41	4	5	83.0%	32.29	Playoffs
China	Ma Xiuyue	9	4	5	2–1; 1–0	59	62	39	36	6	4	85.4%	23.55	
Norway	Steffen Walstad	9	4	5	2–1; 0–1	58	53	40	36	0	11	84.4%	20.96	
Switzerland	Peter de Cruz	9	4	5	1–2; 1–0	51	54	33	38	13	3	84.5%	15.74	
ROC	Sergey Glukhov	9	4	5	1–2; 0–1	58	58	33	38	6	6	81.2%	33.72	
Italy	Joël Retornaz	9	3	6	–	59	65	36	35	3	8	81.7%	30.76	
Denmark	Mikkel Krause	9	1	8	–	36	71	30	39	3	2	78.1%	32.84	

Round robin

Sweden had a bye in draws 4, 7 and 11.

Draw 1

Wednesday, 9 February, 20:05

Sheet D	1	2	3	4	5	6	7	8	9	10	Final
China (Ma)	0	0	0	0	1	1	0	2	0	0	4
Sweden (Edin) 🔨	0	0	1	2	0	0	2	0	0	1	6

Draw 2

Thursday, 10 February, 14:05

Sheet A	1	2	3	4	5	6	7	8	9	10	Final
United States (Shuster) 🔨	1	0	1	0	0	2	0	0	0	X	4
Sweden (Edin)	0	2	0	2	1	0	1	1	0	X	7

Draw 3

Friday, 11 February, 9:05

Sheet C	1	2	3	4	5	6	7	8	9	10	Final
Sweden (Edin) 🔨	0	1	0	2	0	3	0	3	X	X	9
Italy (Retornaz)	0	0	1	0	1	0	1	0	X	X	3

Draw 5

Saturday, 12 February, 14:05

Sheet B	1	2	3	4	5	6	7	8	9	10	Final
Canada (Gushue)	0	0	0	0	2	0	0	2	0	0	4
Sweden (Edin) 🔨	0	1	0	1	0	2	1	0	1	1	7

Draw 6

Sunday, 13 February, 9:05

Sheet A	1	2	3	4	5	6	7	8	9	10	Final
Norway (Walstad)	0	0	1	1	0	1	0	1	0	0	4
Sweden (Edin) 🔨	0	1	0	0	0	0	2	0	1	2	6

Draw 8

Monday, 14 February, 14:05

Sheet C	1	2	3	4	5	6	7	8	9	10	Final
ROC (Glukhov)	0	1	0	0	0	2	0	2	0	0	5
Sweden (Edin) 🔨	1	0	0	2	1	0	2	0	0	1	7

Draw 9

Tuesday, 15 February, 9:05

Sheet D	1	2	3	4	5	6	7	8	9	10	Final
Sweden (Edin) 🔨	0	1	0	1	0	3	0	2	1	X	8
Denmark (Krause)	0	0	1	0	1	0	1	0	0	X	3

Draw 10

Tuesday, 15 February, 20:05

Sheet A	1	2	3	4	5	6	7	8	9	10	Final
Sweden (Edin) 🔨	0	0	1	0	1	0	1	0	2	1	6
Great Britain (Mouat)	1	2	0	1	0	1	0	2	0	0	7

Draw 12

Thursday, 17 February, 9:05

Sheet B	1	2	3	4	5	6	7	8	9	10	Final
Sweden (Edin) 🔨	3	0	0	2	0	1	1	0	1	0	8
Switzerland (de Cruz)	0	0	2	0	3	0	0	2	0	3	10

Semifinal

Thursday, 17 February, 20:05

Sheet A	1	2	3	4	5	6	7	8	9	10	Final
Sweden (Edin) 🔨	0	1	0	2	0	0	0	1	0	1	5
Canada (Gushue)	0	0	1	0	2	0	0	0	0	0	3

Final

Saturday, 19 February, 14:05

Sheet B	1	2	3	4	5	6	7	8	9	10	11	Final
Sweden (Edin)	0	2	1	0	0	0	0	1	0	0	1	5
Great Britain (Mouat) 🔨	1	0	0	1	0	0	1	0	0	1	0	4

=== Women's tournament ===
Sweden has qualified their women's team (five athletes), by finishing in the top six teams in the 2021 World Women's Curling Championship. On 4 June 2021, the Swedish Olympic Committee announced that Team Anna Hasselborg would be their women's team representatives.

Final Round Robin Standings
Team	Skip	Pld	W	L	W–L	PF	PA	EW	EL	BE	SE	S%	DSC	Qualification
Switzerland	Silvana Tirinzoni	9	8	1	–	67	46	44	36	4	12	81.6%	19.14	Playoffs
Sweden	Anna Hasselborg	9	7	2	–	64	49	39	35	6	12	82.0%	25.02	Playoffs
Great Britain	Eve Muirhead	9	5	4	1–1	63	47	39	33	4	9	80.6%	35.27	Playoffs
Japan	Satsuki Fujisawa	9	5	4	1–1	64	62	40	36	2	13	82.3%	36.00	Playoffs
Canada	Jennifer Jones	9	5	4	1–1	71	59	42	41	1	14	80.4%	45.44	
United States	Tabitha Peterson	9	4	5	2–0	60	64	40	39	2	12	79.5%	33.87	
China	Han Yu	9	4	5	1–1	56	67	38	41	3	10	79.6%	30.06	
South Korea	Kim Eun-jung	9	4	5	0–2	62	66	40	42	3	10	80.8%	27.79	
Denmark	Madeleine Dupont	9	2	7	–	50	68	33	41	7	0	77.2%	23.36	
ROC	Alina Kovaleva	9	1	8	–	50	79	34	45	2	7	78.9%	29.34	

Round robin

Sweden had a bye in draws 3, 7 and 10.

Draw 1

Thursday, 10 February, 9:05

Sheet C	1	2	3	4	5	6	7	8	9	10	Final
Sweden (Hasselborg) 🔨	0	1	0	0	1	3	0	3	0	X	8
Japan (Fujisawa)	0	0	2	1	0	0	1	0	1	X	5

Draw 2

Thursday, 10 February, 20:05

Sheet B	1	2	3	4	5	6	7	8	9	10	Final
Sweden (Hasselborg) 🔨	0	0	1	0	0	1	0	X	X	X	2
Great Britain (Muirhead)	0	1	0	4	1	0	2	X	X	X	8

Draw 4

Saturday, 12 February, 9:05

Sheet A	1	2	3	4	5	6	7	8	9	10	Final
Sweden (Hasselborg) 🔨	0	0	2	0	3	0	1	0	1	0	7
Canada (Jones)	1	0	0	1	0	1	0	2	0	1	6

Draw 5

Saturday, 12 February, 20:05

Sheet D	1	2	3	4	5	6	7	8	9	10	Final
Sweden (Hasselborg)	0	0	2	0	0	2	2	0	0	X	6
China (Han) 🔨	0	3	0	1	2	0	0	2	1	X	9

Draw 6

Sunday, 13 February, 14:05

Sheet B	1	2	3	4	5	6	7	8	9	10	Final
United States (Peterson)	0	0	2	1	0	0	1	0	0	X	4
Sweden (Hasselborg) 🔨	0	2	0	0	1	2	0	2	3	X	10

Draw 8

Monday, 14 February, 20:05

Sheet A	1	2	3	4	5	6	7	8	9	10	11	Final
Switzerland (Tirinzoni) 🔨	1	0	0	1	0	0	0	2	0	1	0	5
Sweden (Hasselborg)	0	0	1	0	1	1	1	0	1	0	1	6

Draw 9

Tuesday, 15 February, 14:05

Sheet B	1	2	3	4	5	6	7	8	9	10	Final
Sweden (Hasselborg)	0	2	3	0	3	0	1	X	X	X	9
Denmark (Dupont) 🔨	1	0	0	1	0	1	0	X	X	X	3

Draw 11

Wednesday, 16 February, 20:05

Sheet C	1	2	3	4	5	6	7	8	9	10	Final
ROC (Kovaleva) 🔨	2	1	0	1	0	0	1	0	0	0	5
Sweden (Hasselborg)	0	0	2	0	1	1	0	2	0	2	8

Draw 12

Thursday, 17 February, 14:05

Sheet D	1	2	3	4	5	6	7	8	9	10	Final
South Korea (Kim)	0	2	0	1	0	0	1	0	0	0	4
Sweden (Hasselborg) 🔨	0	0	1	0	1	1	0	2	1	2	8

Semifinal

Friday, 18 February, 20:05

Sheet A	1	2	3	4	5	6	7	8	9	10	11	Final
Sweden (Hasselborg) 🔨	4	0	1	0	0	2	0	1	0	3	0	11
Great Britain (Muirhead)	0	3	0	1	1	0	2	0	4	0	1	12

Bronze medal game

Saturday, 19 February, 20:05

Sheet B	1	2	3	4	5	6	7	8	9	10	Final
Switzerland (Tirinzoni) 🔨	0	1	0	0	1	0	2	0	3	0	7
Sweden (Hasselborg)	1	0	0	2	0	3	0	2	0	1	9

=== Mixed doubles tournament ===
Sweden has qualified their mixed doubles team (two athletes), by finishing in the top seven teams in the 2021 World Mixed Doubles Curling Championship. On 4 June 2021, the Swedish Olympic Committee announced that Almida de Val and Oskar Eriksson would be their mixed doubles representatives.

Final Round Robin Standings
Team	Athletes	Pld	W	L	W–L	PF	PA	EW	EL	BE	SE	S%	DSC	Qualification
Italy	Stefania Constantini / Amos Mosaner	9	9	0	–	79	48	43	28	0	17	79%	25.34	Playoffs
Norway	Kristin Skaslien / Magnus Nedregotten	9	6	3	1–0	68	50	40	28	0	15	82%	24.48	Playoffs
Great Britain	Jennifer Dodds / Bruce Mouat	9	6	3	0–1	60	50	38	33	0	12	79%	22.48	Playoffs
Sweden	Almida de Val / Oskar Eriksson	9	5	4	1–0	55	54	35	33	0	10	76%	21.77	Playoffs
Canada	Rachel Homan / John Morris	9	5	4	0–1	57	54	33	39	0	8	78%	53.73	
Czech Republic	Zuzana Paulová / Tomáš Paul	9	4	5	–	50	65	29	39	1	7	75%	33.41	
Switzerland	Jenny Perret / Martin Rios	9	3	6	1–0	55	58	32	39	0	6	73%	39.04	
United States	Vicky Persinger / Chris Plys	9	3	6	0–1	50	67	34	36	0	9	74%	27.29	
China	Fan Suyuan / Ling Zhi	9	2	7	1–0	51	64	34	36	0	7	74%	17.81	
Australia	Tahli Gill / Dean Hewitt	9	2	7	0–1	52	67	31	38	1	8	72%	50.51	

Round robin

Sweden had a bye in draws 3, 9, 10 and 13.

Draw 1

Wednesday, 2 February, 20:05

Sheet A	1	2	3	4	5	6	7	8	Final
Sweden (de Val / Eriksson)	0	2	0	1	2	0	0	0	5
Great Britain (Dodds / Mouat) 🔨	1	0	3	0	0	1	3	1	9

Draw 2

Thursday, 3 February, 9:05

Sheet B	1	2	3	4	5	6	7	8	Final
Sweden (de Val / Eriksson) 🔨	1	0	0	1	1	0	2	2	7
Czech Republic (Paulová / Paul)	0	1	1	0	0	2	0	0	4

Draw 4

Thursday, 3 February, 20:05

Sheet C	1	2	3	4	5	6	7	8	Final
China (Fan / Ling)	0	2	0	1	1	0	2	0	6
Sweden (de Val / Eriksson) 🔨	1	0	2	0	0	1	0	3	7

Draw 5

Friday, 4 February, 8:35

Sheet B	1	2	3	4	5	6	7	8	Final
Sweden (de Val / Eriksson) 🔨	1	0	1	1	1	0	3	0	7
Australia (Gill / Hewitt)	0	1	0	0	0	3	0	2	6

Draw 6

Friday, 4 February, 13:35

Sheet D	1	2	3	4	5	6	7	8	9	Final
Sweden (de Val / Eriksson) 🔨	1	0	1	0	0	3	0	2	0	7
United States (Persinger / Plys)	0	1	0	1	2	0	3	0	1	8

Draw 7

Saturday, 5 February, 9:05

Sheet D	1	2	3	4	5	6	7	8	Final
Switzerland (Perret / Rios)	0	1	0	0	0	0	X	X	1
Sweden (de Val / Eriksson) 🔨	2	0	1	1	1	1	X	X	6

Draw 8

Saturday, 5 February, 14:05

Sheet C	1	2	3	4	5	6	7	8	Final
Sweden (de Val / Eriksson)	1	1	0	3	0	1	X	X	6
Canada (Homan / Morris) 🔨	0	0	1	0	1	0	X	X	2

Draw 11

Sunday, 6 February, 14:05

Sheet A	1	2	3	4	5	6	7	8	Final
Norway (Skaslien / Nedregotten) 🔨	2	0	1	0	1	1	1	X	6
Sweden (de Val / Eriksson)	0	1	0	1	0	0	0	X	2

Draw 12

Sunday, 6 February, 20:05

Sheet B	1	2	3	4	5	6	7	8	Final
Italy (Constantini / Mosaner)	0	1	1	1	0	5	0	4	12
Sweden (de Val / Eriksson) 🔨	2	0	0	0	3	0	3	0	8

Semifinal

Monday, 7 February, 20:05

Sheet C	1	2	3	4	5	6	7	8	Final
Italy (Constantini / Mosaner) 🔨	1	1	2	1	1	0	2	X	8
Sweden (de Val / Eriksson)	0	0	0	0	0	1	0	X	1

Bronze medal game

Tuesday, 8 February, 14:05

Sheet B	1	2	3	4	5	6	7	8	Final
Sweden (de Val / Eriksson)	0	4	3	1	1	0	X	X	9
Great Britain (Dodds / Mouat) 🔨	1	0	0	0	0	2	X	X	3

== Figure skating ==
Sweden qualified one male and one female figure skater, based on its placement at the 2021 World Figure Skating Championships in Stockholm, Sweden. Nikolaj Majorov and Josefin Taljegård were selected in January 2022.

Athlete	Event	SP		FS		Total	
Athlete	Event	Points	Rank	Points	Rank	Points	Rank
Nikolaj Majorov	Men's singles	78.54	20 Q	142.24	21	220.78	21
Josefin Taljegård	Ladies' singles	54.51	26	Did not advance			26

== Freestyle skiing ==
SOC selected fourteen athletes in freestyle.

Freeski

Athlete	Event	Qualification					Final				
Athlete	Event	Run 1	Run 2	Run 3	Best	Rank	Run 1	Run 2	Run 3	Best	Rank
Hugo Burvall	Men's big air	47.25	55.25	46.00	101.25	24	Did not advance				24
Hugo Burvall	Men's slopestyle	33.40	28.58	—N/a	33.40	28	Did not advance				28
Henrik Harlaut	Men's big air	93.00	83.50	42.00	176.50	4 Q	86.00	90.00	91.00	181.00	3rd place, bronze medalist(s)
Henrik Harlaut	Men's slopestyle	37.70	48.16	—N/a	48.16	21	Did not advance				21
Oliwer Magnusson	Men's big air	88.00	89.25	84.00	177.25	3 Q	87.50	79.00	90.75	178.25	4
Oliwer Magnusson	Men's slopestyle	73.46	39.16	—N/a	73.46	12 Q	23.75	22.75	40.46	40.46	11
Jesper Tjäder	Men's big air	34.75	91.75	78.25	170.00	12 Q	77.25	78.25	92.00	170.25	7
Jesper Tjäder	Men's slopestyle	59.15	79.38	—N/a	79.38	4 Q	85.35	16.11	37.33	85.35	3rd place, bronze medalist(s)

Moguls

Athlete	Event	Qualification								Final											
Athlete	Event	Run 1				Run 2				Run 1				Run 2				Run 3			
Athlete	Event	Time	Points	Total	Rank	Time	Points	Total	Rank	Time	Points	Total	Rank	Time	Points	Total	Rank	Time	Points	Total	Rank
Felix Elofsson	Men's moguls	25.18	14.80	73.24	19	25.24	14.72	78.87	1 Q	25.36	14.56	74.97	17	Did not advance							17
Oskar Elofsson	Men's moguls	25.94	13.79	69.26	26	24.85	15.23	73.52	12	Did not advance											22
Ludvig Fjällström	Men's moguls	25.69	14.12	76.20	7 Q	Bye				24.85	15.23	75.37	15	Did not advance							15
Walter Wallberg	Men's moguls	24.16	16.14	79.12	2 Q	Bye				23.63	16.84	78.05	4 Q	24.10	16.22	80.33	1 Q	23.70	16.75	83.23	1st place, gold medalist(s)

Albin Holmgren was originally selected but was deselected due to injury.

Ski cross

Athlete	Event	Seeding		Round of 16	Quarterfinal	Semifinal	Final	
Athlete	Event	Time	Rank	Position	Position	Position	Position	Rank
Viktor Andersson	Men's ski cross	1:13.49	23	4	Did not advance			27
Elliott Baralo	Men's ski cross	1:13.82	28	4	Did not advance			29
David Mobärg	Men's ski cross	1:12.97	13	3	Did not advance			19
Erik Mobärg	Men's ski cross	1:13.01	14	1 Q	1 Q	1 FA	4	4
Alexandra Edebo	Women's ski cross	1:18.49	10	2 Q	4	Did not advance		13
Sandra Näslund	Women's ski cross	1:15.21	1	1 Q	1 Q	1 FA	1	1st place, gold medalist(s)

== Ice hockey ==
Summary

Key:

- OT – Overtime
- GWS – Match decided by penalty-shootout

Team	Event	Group stage					Qualification playoff	Quarterfinal	Semifinal	Final / BM	
Team	Event	Opposition Score	Opposition Score	Opposition Score	Opposition Score	Rank	Opposition Score	Opposition Score	Opposition Score	Opposition Score	Rank
Sweden men's	Men's tournament	Latvia; W 3–2	Slovakia; W 4–1	Finland; L 3–4 OT	—N/a	2 QQ	Bye	Canada; W 2–0	ROC; L 1–2 GWS	Slovakia; L 0–4	4
Sweden women's	Women's tournament	Japan; L 1–3	Czech Republic; L 1–3	China; W 2–1	Denmark; W 3–1	3 Q	—N/a	Canada; L 0–11	Did not advance		8

=== Men's tournament ===
Sweden men's national ice hockey team qualified a team of 25 players by finishing 4th in the 2019 IIHF World Ranking. SOC selected the team in June 2021.

Team roster

The roster was announced on 21 January 2022.

Head coach: Johan Garpenlöv

No.	Pos.	Name	Height	Weight	Birthdate	Team
2	D	Christian Folin	1.91 m (6 ft 3 in)	93 kg (205 lb)	9 February 1991 (aged 31)	(Sweden) Frölunda HC
5	D	Oscar Fantenberg	1.84 m (6 ft 0 in)	93 kg (205 lb)	7 October 1991 (aged 30)	(Russia) SKA Saint Petersburg
7	D	Henrik Tömmernes (A)	1.86 m (6 ft 1 in)	84 kg (185 lb)	28 August 1990 (aged 31)	(Switzerland) Genève-Servette HC
8	F	Fredrik Olofsson	1.86 m (6 ft 1 in)	84 kg (185 lb)	27 May 1996 (aged 25)	(Sweden) IK Oskarshamn
12	F	Max Friberg	1.80 m (5 ft 11 in)	88 kg (194 lb)	20 November 1992 (aged 29)	(Sweden) Frölunda HC
15	F	Gustav Rydahl	1.91 m (6 ft 3 in)	91 kg (201 lb)	11 September 1994 (aged 27)	(Sweden) Färjestad BK
16	F	Marcus Krüger (A)	1.83 m (6 ft 0 in)	81 kg (179 lb)	27 May 1990 (aged 31)	(Switzerland) Zürich
18	F	Dennis Everberg	1.93 m (6 ft 4 in)	95 kg (209 lb)	31 December 1991 (aged 30)	(Sweden) Rögle BK
19	F	Pontus Holmberg	1.80 m (5 ft 11 in)	81 kg (179 lb)	9 March 1999 (aged 22)	(Sweden) Växjö Lakers
23	F	Lucas Wallmark	1.83 m (6 ft 0 in)	81 kg (179 lb)	5 September 1995 (aged 26)	(Russia) CSKA Moscow
27	F	Joakim Nordström	1.85 m (6 ft 1 in)	88 kg (194 lb)	25 February 1992 (aged 29)	(Russia) CSKA Moscow
31	G	Lars Johansson	1.85 m (6 ft 1 in)	90 kg (200 lb)	11 July 1987 (aged 34)	(Russia) SKA Saint Petersburg
32	D	Lukas Bengtsson	1.78 m (5 ft 10 in)	82 kg (181 lb)	14 April 1994 (aged 27)	(Belarus) Dinamo Minsk
33	D	Linus Hultström	1.79 m (5 ft 10 in)	89 kg (196 lb)	9 December 1992 (aged 29)	(Russia) Metallurg Magnitogorsk
34	F	Daniel Brodin	1.86 m (6 ft 1 in)	85 kg (187 lb)	9 February 1990 (aged 32)	(Switzerland) HC Fribourg-Gottéron
35	G	Magnus Hellberg	1.97 m (6 ft 6 in)	95 kg (209 lb)	4 April 1991 (aged 30)	(Russia) HC Sochi
39	G	Adam Reideborn	1.84 m (6 ft 0 in)	81 kg (179 lb)	18 January 1992 (aged 30)	(Russia) CSKA Moscow
48	F	Carl Klingberg	1.90 m (6 ft 3 in)	98 kg (216 lb)	28 January 1991 (aged 31)	(Switzerland) EV Zug
52	D	Philip Holm	1.86 m (6 ft 1 in)	86 kg (190 lb)	8 December 1991 (aged 30)	(Finland) Jokerit
58	F	Anton Lander (C)	1.82 m (6 ft 0 in)	87 kg (192 lb)	24 April 1991 (aged 30)	(Switzerland) EV Zug
59	F	Linus Johansson	1.90 m (6 ft 3 in)	90 kg (200 lb)	30 November 1992 (aged 29)	(Sweden) Färjestad BK
64	D	Jonathan Pudas	1.79 m (5 ft 10 in)	79 kg (174 lb)	26 April 1993 (aged 28)	(Sweden) Skellefteå AIK
81	D	Theodor Lennström	1.86 m (6 ft 1 in)	86 kg (190 lb)	8 August 1994 (aged 27)	(Russia) Torpedo Nizhny Novgorod
86	F	Mathias Bromé	1.82 m (6 ft 0 in)	83 kg (183 lb)	29 July 1994 (aged 27)	(Switzerland) HC Davos
95	F	Jacob de la Rose	1.89 m (6 ft 2 in)	95 kg (209 lb)	20 May 1995 (aged 26)	(Sweden) Färjestad BK

Group play

Pos	Team	Pld	W	OTW	OTL	L	GF	GA	GD	Pts	Qualification
1	Finland	3	2	1	0	0	13	6	+7	8	Quarterfinals
2	Sweden	3	2	0	1	0	10	7	+3	7	Quarterfinals
3	Slovakia	3	1	0	0	2	8	12	−4	3	Playoffs
4	Latvia	3	0	0	0	3	5	11	−6	0	Playoffs

Source: IIHF
Rules for classification: Preliminary round tiebreakers

February 10, 2022; 12:10 v	Sweden	3–2 (1–0, 2–1, 0–1)	Latvia	Beijing National Indoor Stadium, Beijing; Attendance: 873

Game reference

Lars Johansson
Goalies
Ivars Punnenovs
Referees:
(Czech Republic) Martin Fraňo
(Finland) Kristian Vikman
Linesmen:
(United States) William Hancock
(Russia) Nikita Shalagin

Wallmark (Holmberg, Olofsson) – 09:42	1–0
Lander (Bromé, Klingberg) – 20:30	2–0
Wallmark (Tömmernes, Pudas) (PP) – 33:39	3–0
	3–1	36:07 – Krastenbergs (Balinskis, Dārziņš) (PP)
	3–2	46:48 – Jeļisejevs (Dārziņš, Balinskis) (PP)

8 min
Penalties
10 min
26
Shots
17

February 11, 2022; 16:40 v	Sweden	4–1 (3–0, 0–0, 1–1)	Slovakia	Wukesong Arena, Beijing; Attendance: 653

Game reference

Magnus Hellberg
Goalies
Matej Tomek
Referees:
(Russia) Evgenii Romasko
(Germany) André Schrader
Linesmen:
(Switzerland) David Obwegeser
(United States) Brian Oliver

Nordström (Bengtsson, Friberg) – 11:22	1–0
Wallmark (Pudas, Tömmernes) (PP2) – 18:10	2–0
Friberg (Holm, Nordström) – 19:55	3–0
Klingberg (Lander, Bromé) (ENG) – 57:44	4–0
	4–1	58:18 – Slafkovský (Nemec)

12 min
Penalties
12 min
29
Shots
41

February 13, 2022; 16:40 v	Finland	4–3 OT (0–0, 0–3, 3–0) (OT: 1–0)	Sweden	Beijing National Indoor Stadium, Beijing; Attendance: 963

Game reference

Juho Olkinuora
Goalies
Magnus Hellberg
Referees:
(Canada) Michael Campbell
(Russia) Roman Gofman
Linesmen:
(United States) William Hancock
(Russia) Nikita Shalagin

	0–1	24:24 – Wallmark (Tömmernes, Pudas) (PP)
	0–2	28:39 – Bengtsson (Tömmernes, Bromé) (PP)
	0–3	31:36 – Lander (Pudas, Klingberg) (PP)
Hartikainen (Manninen, Vatanen) (PP) – 45:34	1–3
Pakarinen (Hartikainen, Manninen) (PP) – 55:30	2–3
Pakarinen (Lehtonen, Hartikainen) – 57:11	3–3
Pesonen – 62:01	4–3

37 min
Penalties
8 min
27
Shots
30

Quarterfinal

February 16, 2022; 21:30 v	Sweden	2–0 (0–0, 0–0, 2–0)	Canada	Beijing National Indoor Stadium, Beijing; Attendance: 950

Game reference
Lars Johansson	Goalies	Matt Tomkins	Referees: (United States) Andrew Bruggeman (Russia) Evgenii Romasko; Linesmen: (United States) William Hancock (Russia) Gleb Lazarev
Wallmark – 50:15 / 1–0; Lander (Holmberg) (ENG) – 58:10 / 2–0			Referees: (United States) Andrew Bruggeman (Russia) Evgenii Romasko; Linesmen: (United States) William Hancock (Russia) Gleb Lazarev
6 min	Penalties	6 min	Referees: (United States) Andrew Bruggeman (Russia) Evgenii Romasko; Linesmen: (United States) William Hancock (Russia) Gleb Lazarev
26	Shots	22	Referees: (United States) Andrew Bruggeman (Russia) Evgenii Romasko; Linesmen: (United States) William Hancock (Russia) Gleb Lazarev

Semifinal

February 18, 2022; 21:10 v	ROC	2–1 GWS (0–0, 1–0, 0–1) (OT: 0–0) (SO: 1–0)	Sweden	Beijing National Indoor Stadium, Beijing; Attendance: 1,161

Game reference
Ivan Fedotov	Goalies	Lars Johansson	Referees: (United States) Andrew Bruggeman (Canada) Oliver Gouin; Linesmen: (Czech Republic) Daniel Hynek (Czech Republic) Jiří Ondráček
Slepyshev (Karnaukhov, Yakovlev) – 20:15 / 1–0; / 1–1 / 46:22 – Lander (Tömmernes, Pudas)			Referees: (United States) Andrew Bruggeman (Canada) Oliver Gouin; Linesmen: (Czech Republic) Daniel Hynek (Czech Republic) Jiří Ondráček
Slepyshev (miss); Grigorenko (miss); Gusev; Tkachyov (miss); Yakovlev; Gusev (miss); Gusev (miss); Gritsyuk	Shootout	(miss) Klingberg; Wallmark; Nordström; (miss) Tömmernes; (miss) Lander; (miss) Klingberg; (miss) Wallmark; (miss) Friberg	Referees: (United States) Andrew Bruggeman (Canada) Oliver Gouin; Linesmen: (Czech Republic) Daniel Hynek (Czech Republic) Jiří Ondráček
4 min	Penalties	4 min	Referees: (United States) Andrew Bruggeman (Canada) Oliver Gouin; Linesmen: (Czech Republic) Daniel Hynek (Czech Republic) Jiří Ondráček
41	Shots	35	Referees: (United States) Andrew Bruggeman (Canada) Oliver Gouin; Linesmen: (Czech Republic) Daniel Hynek (Czech Republic) Jiří Ondráček

Bronze medal game

February 19, 2022; 21:10 v	Sweden	0–4 (0–0, 0–2, 0–2)	Slovakia	Beijing National Indoor Stadium, Beijing; Attendance: 1,229

Game reference

Lars Johansson
Goalies
Patrik Rybár
Referees:
(Canada) Oliver Gouin
(Russia) Evgenii Romasko
Linesmen:
(Russia) Gleb Lazarev
(Russia) Nikita Shalagin

0–1	23:17 – Slafkovský (Čerešňák)
0–2	32:47 – Takáč (Regenda) (PP)
0–3	58:26 – Slafkovský (Cehlárik) (ENG)
0–4	58:46 – Regenda (ENG)

6 min
Penalties
4 min
28
Shots
43

=== Women's tournament ===
Sweden women's national ice hockey team qualified by winning a final qualification tournament. SOC selected the team for the games shortly thereafter.

Team roster

The roster was announced on 19 January 2022. Before travelling to Beijing, selected players Emmy Alasalmi, Sara Grahn, Linnea Hedin and Hanna Olsson tested positive for COVID-19 and were replaced by Linnéa Andersson, Paula Bergström, Linn Peterson, and Agnes Åker.

Head Coach: Ulf Lundberg

No.	Pos.	Name	Height	Weight	Birthdate	Team
1	G	Agnes Åker	1.70 m (5 ft 7 in)	61 kg (134 lb)	22 July 1997 (aged 24)	(Sweden) AIK
3	D	Anna Kjellbin	1.70 m (5 ft 7 in)	63 kg (139 lb)	16 March 1994 (aged 27)	(Sweden) Luleå HF/MSSK
4	D	Linnéa Andersson	1.71 m (5 ft 7 in)	61 kg (134 lb)	30 September 1998 (aged 23)	(Sweden) HV71
5	D	Johanna Fällman	1.73 m (5 ft 8 in)	72 kg (159 lb)	21 June 1990 (aged 31)	(Sweden) Luleå HF/MSSK
8	D	Ebba Berglund	1.60 m (5 ft 3 in)	65 kg (143 lb)	13 June 1998 (aged 23)	(Sweden) HV71
9	D	Jessica Adolfsson	1.76 m (5 ft 9 in)	74 kg (163 lb)	15 July 1998 (aged 23)	(Sweden) Linköping HC
10	D	Mina Waxin	1.65 m (5 ft 5 in)	63 kg (139 lb)	29 April 2001 (aged 20)	(Sweden) Brynäs IF
11	F	Josefin Bouveng	1.73 m (5 ft 8 in)	66 kg (146 lb)	15 May 2001 (aged 20)	(Sweden) Brynäs IF
12	D	Maja Nylén Persson	1.62 m (5 ft 4 in)	66 kg (146 lb)	20 November 2000 (aged 21)	(Sweden) Brynäs IF
13	F	Emma Murén	1.66 m (5 ft 5 in)	65 kg (143 lb)	17 January 1998 (aged 24)	(Sweden) Brynäs IF
15	F	Lisa Johansson	1.61 m (5 ft 3 in)	59 kg (130 lb)	11 April 1992 (aged 29)	(Sweden) AIK
16	F	Linnéa Johansson	1.71 m (5 ft 7 in)	65 kg (143 lb)	5 April 2002 (aged 19)	(Sweden) Linköping HC
17	F	Sofie Lundin	1.64 m (5 ft 5 in)	63 kg (139 lb)	15 February 2000 (aged 21)	(Sweden) Djurgårdens IF
19	F	Sara Hjalmarsson	1.76 m (5 ft 9 in)	72 kg (159 lb)	8 February 1998 (aged 23)	(United States) Providence Friars
20	D	Paula Bergström	1.72 m (5 ft 8 in)		26 January 1999 (aged 23)	(Sweden) Modo Hockey
22	F	Linn Peterson	1.74 m (5 ft 9 in)	75 kg (165 lb)	8 January 1994 (aged 28)	(Sweden) Luleå HF/MSSK
24	F	Felizia Wikner-Zienkiewicz	1.65 m (5 ft 5 in)	52 kg (115 lb)	17 September 1999 (aged 22)	(Sweden) HV71
25	F	Lina Ljungblom	1.67 m (5 ft 6 in)	79 kg (174 lb)	15 October 2001 (aged 20)	(Sweden) Modo Hockey
27	F	Emma Nordin	1.68 m (5 ft 6 in)	74 kg (163 lb)	22 March 1991 (aged 30)	(Sweden) Luleå HF/MSSK
28	F	Michelle Löwenhielm	1.72 m (5 ft 8 in)	66 kg (146 lb)	22 March 1995 (aged 26)	(Sweden) SDE Hockey
29	F	Olivia Carlsson	1.74 m (5 ft 9 in)	73 kg (161 lb)	2 March 1995 (aged 26)	(Sweden) Modo Hockey
30	G	Emma Söderberg	1.71 m (5 ft 7 in)	69 kg (152 lb)	18 February 1998 (aged 23)	(United States) Minnesota Duluth Bulldogs
35	G	Ida Boman	1.67 m (5 ft 6 in)	61 kg (134 lb)	1 April 2003 (aged 18)	(Sweden) Djurgårdens IF

Group play

Pos	Team	Pld	W	OTW	OTL	L	GF	GA	GD	Pts	Qualification
1	Japan	4	2	1	1	0	13	7	+6	9	Quarterfinals
2	Czech Republic	4	2	0	1	1	10	8	+2	7	Quarterfinals
3	Sweden	4	2	0	0	2	7	8	−1	6	Quarterfinals
4	China (H)	4	1	1	0	2	7	7	0	5	Eliminated
5	Denmark	4	1	0	0	3	7	14	−7	3	Eliminated

Source: IIHF
Rules for classification: Tiebreakers
(H) Host

3 February 2022; 16:40 v	Sweden	1–3 (0–1, 1–0, 0–2)	Japan	Wukesong Arena, Beijing; Attendance: 482

Game reference

Emma Söderberg
Goalies
Nana Fujimoto
Referees:
(Canada) Cianna Lieffers
(Canada) Elizabeth Mantha
Linesmen:
(United States) Kendall Hanley
(Russia) Diana Mokhova

	0–1	19:13 – Koike (Kubo, Osawa)
Nylén Persson (Wikner-Zienkiewicz) – 20:30	1–1
	1–2	44:03 – Ukita (Ak. Shiga, Ao. Shiga)
	1–3	58:59 – Yoneyama (Koyama, Hosoyamada) (ENG)

6 min
Penalties
4 min
27
Shots
40

5 February 2022; 16:40 v	Czech Republic	3–1 (1–0, 1–1, 1–0)	Sweden	Beijing National Indoor Stadium, Beijing; Attendance: 438

Game reference

Klára Peslarová
Goalies
Emma Söderberg
Referees:
(Canada) Cianna Lieffers
(Canada) Elizabeth Mantha
Linesmen:
(Russia) Diana Mokhova
(United States) Jacqueline Spresser

Vanišová – 18:23	1–0
Hymlárová (SH) – 33:56	2–0
	2–1	39:16 – Muren (Lin. Johansson, Adolfsson)
Vanišová – 54:03	3–1

12 min
Penalties
8 min
46
Shots
28

7 February 2022; 21:10 v	China	1–2 (1–0, 0–2, 0–0)	Sweden	Wukesong Arena, Beijing; Attendance: 588

Game reference

Kimberly Newell
Goalies
Emma Söderberg
Referees:
(Finland) Anniina Nurmi
(Switzerland) Anna Wiegand
Linesmen:
(Finland) Jenni Heikkinen
(Austria) Julia Kainberger

Betinol (Lum) – 05:16	1–0
	1–1	25:14 – Wikner-Zienkiewicz (PS)
	1–2	26:39 – Bouveng (Nylén Persson, Waxin)

2 min
Penalties
8 min
33
Shots
33

8 February 2022; 21:10 v	Sweden	3–1 (1–0, 1–1, 1–0)	Denmark	Wukesong Arena, Beijing; Attendance: 696

Game reference

Emma Söderberg
Goalies
Cassandra Repstock-Romme
Referees:
(Finland) Anniina Nurmi
(United States) Chelsea Rapin
Linesmen:
(Sweden) Anna Hammar
(Finland) Jenni Heikkinen

Nordin (Lundin) – 04:00	1–0
	1–1	34:04 – Oksbjerg (Jakobsen, Friis-Hansen)
Lis. Johansson (Lundin, Waxin) (PP) – 36:00	2–1
Berglund (Ljungblom) (PP, ENG) – 59:43	3–1

14 min
Penalties
10 min
21
Shots
26

Quarterfinal

11 February 2022; 21:10 v	Canada	11–0 (4–0, 5–0, 2–0)	Sweden	Wukesong Arena, Beijing; Attendance: 669

Game reference

Emerance Maschmeyer
Goalies
Emma Söderberg
Ida Boman
Referees:
(Russia) Daria Abrosimova
(Canada) Lacey Senuk
Linesmen:
(Canada) Alex Clarke
(Austria) Julia Kainberger

Jenner (Poulin, Nurse) – 03:05	1–0
Fillier (Johnston, Poulin) (PP) – 17:05	2–0
Fillier (Rattray, Fast) – 17:41	3–0
Rattray (Thompson, Nurse) (PP) – 19:35	4–0
Spooner (Nurse, Larocque) (PP) – 23:16	5–0
Ambrose (Poulin, Thompson) – 25:15	6–0
Turnbull (Ambrose, Saulnier) – 26:56	7–0
Jenner (Poulin, Nurse) – 28:13	8–0
Clark (Bell, Hart) (PP) – 29:09	9–0
Jenner (Hart, Thompson) – 50:55	10–0
Fillier (Spooner, Fast) – 52:06	11–0

8 min
Penalties
14 min
56
Shots
11

== Luge ==
Sweden qualified one woman and one man in luge. SOC selected siblings Svante Kohala and Tove Kohala.

Athlete	Event	Run 1		Run 2		Run 3		Run 4		Total	
Athlete	Event	Time	Rank	Time	Rank	Time	Rank	Time	Rank	Time	Rank
Svante Kohala	Men's singles	58.517	21	58.779	20	58.368	18 Q	58.333	19	3:53.997	20
Tove Kohala	Women's singles	59.533	20	59.776	21	59.333	23 Q	1:02.431	20	4:01.073	20

== Ski jumping ==
Sweden qualified one athlete in ski jumping. SOC selected Frida Westman. She was Sweden's first woman to compete in the sport. It was also Sweden's first participation in the sport since the 1994 games.

Athlete	Event	First round			Final			Total	
Athlete	Event	Distance	Points	Rank	Distance	Points	Rank	Points	Rank
Frida Westman	Women's normal hill	87	80.9	21 Q	90	94.6	10	175.5	16

== Snowboarding ==
Sweden qualified two athletes in big air and slopestyle. SOC selected Niklas Mattsson and Sven Thorgren.

Freestyle

Athlete	Event	Qualification					Final				
Athlete	Event	Run 1	Run 2	Run 3	Best/Total	Rank	Run 1	Run 2	Run 3	Best/Total	Rank
Niklas Mattsson	Men's big air	18.50	80.75	21.75	102.50	20	Did not advance				
Niklas Mattsson	Men's slopestyle	24.18	20.55	—N/a	24.18	30	Did not advance				
Sven Thorgren	Men's big air	80.75	70.25	33.75	151.00	7 Q	25.25	67.00	21.50	88.50	11
Sven Thorgren	Men's slopestyle	40.73	34.71	—N/a	40.73	24	Did not advance				

== Speed skating ==
Nils van der Poel has qualified in men's 5 000 and 10 000 metres by finishing top 8 in the qualification points ranking. He was selected by SOC in November 2021.

Athlete	Event	Final	
Athlete	Event	Time	Rank
Nils van der Poel	Men's 5 000 m	6:08.84 OR	1st place, gold medalist(s)
Nils van der Poel	Men's 10 000 m	12:30.74 WR OR	1st place, gold medalist(s)

Key: OR=Olympic record, WR=World record

== See also ==
- Sweden at the 2022 Winter Paralympics
