= Christian Nummedal =

Norwegian freestyle skier

Personal information
- Born: 3 November 1995 (age 30)

Sport
- Country: Norway
- Sport: Freestyle skiing
- Event(s): Slopestyle, Big air
Medal record
Men's freestyle skiing
World Championships
Silver medal – second place	2023 Bakuriani	Slopestyle

Christian Nummedal (born 3 November 1995) is a Norwegian freestyle skier. Best known for his results in big air events, he won the big air category of the 2017–18 FIS Freestyle Ski World Cup, but also won a silver medal in slopestyle at the 2023 World Championships.

== Early career ==
Nummedal made his FIS Freestyle Ski World Cup debut in January 2011 in Kreischberg. In the halfpipe event there, he finished 13th. However, he did not compete in the 2011–12 season and only once in the 2012–13 season. During the 2013–14 FIS Freestyle Skiing World Cup he only competed once, but reached the podium, with a 3rd place in Silvaplana.

== Elite career ==
Once again sitting out the 2014–15 season, he returned in 2015–16 and managed a 10th place. In the 2016–17 FIS Freestyle Ski World Cup, he became a regular contestant and won his first World Cup event, the big air contest in Voss in March 2017. His second win came in the 2017–18 FIS Freestyle Ski World Cup, the big air in Mönchengladbach in December 2017, followed by his third in March 2018 in Québec City. He won the big air category of the 2017–18 Freestyle Ski World Cup. The same year, he finished 5th in big air at Winter X Games XXII.

His World Cup races from 2019 onwards included a 4th place in December 2019 in Beijing, a second place in November 2020 in Stubai and a fifth place at the same location in November 2021. His last race came in March 2023 in Silvaplana.

At the Winter Olympics, Nummedal finished 28th and 23rd in slopestyle at the 2018 and 2022 Winter Olympics, respectively. His career best was a 10th place in big air at the 2022 Winter Olympics.

At the World Championships, he competed in slopestyle at the 2017 World Championships and both slopestyle and big air at the 2021 World Championships—with mostly low placements. At the 2023 World Championships, he finished seventh in the big air event and won the silver medal in slopestyle.

Nummedal retired in the spring of 2023. After winning a World Championships medal, he stated that "The next big goal I can set for myself is another Olympics, and I don't have it in me. It is better, then, to give up competitive skiing while I still love everything that has to do with skiing". Nummedal hails from Hakadal.
