= Spain at the 2022 Winter Olympics =

- IOC code: ESP
- NOC: Spanish Olympic Committee
- Website: www.coe.es (in Spanish)

in Beijing, China 4–20 February 2022
- Competitors: 14 (10 men and 4 women) in 6 sports
- Flag bearers (opening): Queralt Castellet; Ander Mirambell
- Flag bearer (closing): Adrián Díaz
- Medals Ranked 25th: Gold 0 Silver 1 Bronze 0 Total 1

Winter Olympics appearances (overview)
- 1936; 1948; 1952; 1956; 1960; 1964; 1968; 1972; 1976; 1980; 1984; 1988; 1992; 1994; 1998; 2002; 2006; 2010; 2014; 2018; 2022; 2026

Spain competed at the 2022 Winter Olympics in Beijing, China, from 4 to 20 February 2022.

The Spanish team consisted of ten men and four women competing in six sports.

On January 25, 2022, snowboarder Queralt Castellet and skeleton athlete Ander Mirambell were named as the Spanish flagbearers during the opening ceremony. Meanwhile, figure skater Adrián Díaz served as the country's flagbearer during the closing ceremony.

== Medalists ==
The following competitors won medals at the games. In the by discipline sections below, medalists' names are bolded.

Medal	Name	Sport	Event	Date
Silver	Queralt Castellet	Snowboarding	Women's halfpipe	February 10

== Competitors ==
The following is the list of number of competitors participating at the Games per sport/discipline.

Sport	Men	Women	Total
Alpine skiing	2	1	3
Cross-country skiing	2	0	2
Figure skating	2	2	4
Freestyle skiing	2	0	2
Skeleton	1	0	1
Snowboarding	1	1	2
Total	10	4	14

== Alpine skiing ==
Spain has qualified two male and one female alpine skier.

Athlete	Event	Run 1		Run 2		Total	
Athlete	Event	Time	Rank	Time	Rank	Time	Rank
Adur Etxezarreta	Men's downhill	—N/a				1:44.12	17
Adur Etxezarreta	Men's super-G	—N/a				DNF	
Joaquim Salarich	Men's slalom	DNF		Did not advance			
Núria Pau	Women's giant slalom	1:04.19	40	DNF			

== Cross-country skiing ==
Spain qualified three male and one female cross-country skiers, but will only use two male quotas.

Distance

Athlete	Event	Classical		Freestyle		Final		
Athlete	Event	Time	Rank	Time	Rank	Time	Deficit	Rank
Imanol Rojo	Men's 15 km classical	—N/a				41:24.2	+3:29.4	39
Imanol Rojo	Men's 30 km skiathlon	41:37.7	26	38:54.0	15	1:21:09.2	+4:59.4	21
Imanol Rojo	Men's 50 kilometre freestyle	—N/a				1:14:50.5	+3:17.8	21

Sprint

Athlete	Event	Qualification		Quarterfinal		Semifinal		Final	
Athlete	Event	Time	Rank	Time	Rank	Time	Rank	Time	Rank
Jaume Pueyo	Men's	2:55.76	37	Did not advance					

== Figure skating ==
Based on placements at the 2021 World Figure Skating Championships in Stockholm, Sweden, Spain qualified 2 athletes (1 male and 1 female) in the ice dancing event.

Laura Barquero failed the doping test, as announced after the closing of the Olympics.

Athlete	Event	SP / SD		FS / FD		Total	
Athlete	Event	Points	Rank	Points	Rank	Points	Rank
Laura Barquero; Marco Zandron	Pairs	63.34	11 **Q**	118.02	11	181.36	11
Olivia Smart; Adrián Díaz	Ice dance	77.70	9 **Q**	121.41	6	199.11	8

== Freestyle skiing ==
By meeting the basic qualification standards, Spain has qualified two male freestyle skier.

Men's

Athlete	Event	Qualification					Final				
Athlete	Event	Run 1	Run 2	Run 3	Total	Rank	Run 1	Run 2	Run 3	Total	Rank
Javier Lliso	Men's big air	90.25	80.50	~~79.50~~	170.75	9 **Q**	~~51.25~~	89.00	82.50	171.50	6
Javier Lliso	Men's slopestyle	~~21.95~~	**69.16**	—N/a	69.16	14	Did not advance				
Thibault Magnin	Men's big air	41.25	~~21.75~~	38.50	79.75	28	Did not advance				
Thibault Magnin	Men's slopestyle	**33.06**	~~14.78~~	—N/a	33.06	29	Did not advance				

== Skeleton ==
Based on placements of the World Ranking as of January 16, Spain qualified one male athlete.

Athlete	Event	Run 1		Run 2		Run 3		Run 4		Total	
Athlete	Event	Time	Rank	Time	Rank	Time	Rank	Time	Rank	Time	Rank
Ander Mirambell	Men's	1:02.45	23	1:03.36	25	1:02.34	24	Did not advance		3:08.15	24

== Snowboarding ==
By meeting the basic qualification standards, Spain has qualified at least one male and one female snowboarder.

Freestyle

Athlete	Event	Qualification				Final				
Athlete	Event	Run 1	Run 2	Best	Rank	Run 1	Run 2	Run 3	Best	Rank
**Queralt Castellet**	Women's halfpipe	78.75	49.50	78.75	4 **Q**	69.25	90.25	78.25	90.25	2nd place, silver medalist(s)

Snowboard cross

Athlete	Event	Seeding		1/8 final	Quarterfinal	Semifinal	Small Final	
Athlete	Event	Time	Rank	Position	Position	Position	Position	Rank
Lucas Eguibar	Men's snowboard cross	1:18.73	21 **Q**	2 **Q**	2 **Q**	4	3	7
