= Winter X Games XXVI =

Aspen Games

- Venue: Buttermilk Ski Resort
- Location: Aspen, United States
- Dates: 21-23 January 2022

Winter X Games XXVI was held from 21 to 23 January 2022 in Aspen, Colorado, United States.

== Medal table ==
Rank	Nation	Gold	Silver	Bronze	Total
1	New Zealand (NZL)	3	0	0	3
2	United States (USA)	2	6	5	13
3	Norway (NOR)	2	2	0	4
4	France (FRA)	2	0	0	2
5	Canada (CAN)	1	3	4	8
6	Japan (JPN)	1	1	3	5
7	Switzerland (SUI)	1	1	0	2
8	Australia (AUS)	1	0	0	1
8	Estonia (EST)	1	0	0	1
10	Spain (ESP)	0	1	0	1
11	Finland (FIN)	0	0	1	1
11	Sweden (SWE)	0	0	1	1
Totals (12 entries)		14	14	14	42

== Medal summary ==
=== Snowboard ===
Event	Gold	Silver	Bronze
Men's Slopestyle	Mark McMorris; Canada	Marcus Kleveland; Norway	Sven Thorgren; Sweden
Men's SuperPipe	Scotty James; Australia	Ayumu Hirano; Japan	Kaishu Hirano; Japan
Men's Big Air	Marcus Kleveland; Norway	Max Parrot; Canada	Rene Rinnekangas; Finland
Women's Slopestyle	Zoi Sadowski-Synnott; New Zealand	Jamie Anderson; United States	Laurie Blouin; Canada
Women's SuperPipe	Sena Tomita; Japan	Queralt Castellet; Spain	Haruna Matsumoto; Japan
Women's Big Air	Zoi Sadowski-Synnott; New Zealand	Jamie Anderson; United States	Miyabi Onitsuka; Japan
Knuckle Huck	Marcus Kleveland; Norway	Fridtjof Tischendorf; Norway	Dusty Henricksen; United States

=== Ski ===
Event	Gold	Silver	Bronze
Men's Slopestyle	Andri Ragettli; Switzerland	Max Moffatt; Canada	Alex Hall; United States
Men's SuperPipe	Nico Porteous; New Zealand	Aaron Blunck; United States	David Wise; United States
Men's Big Air	Alex Hall; United States	Mac Forehand; United States	Teal Harle; Canada
Women's Slopestyle	Tess Ledeux; France	Mathilde Gremaud; Switzerland	Megan Oldham; Canada
Women's SuperPipe	Kelly Sildaru; Estonia	Brita Sigourney; United States	Hanna Faulhaber; United States
Women's Big Air	Tess Ledeux; France	Megan Oldham; Canada	Olivia Asselin; Canada
Knuckle Huck	Quinn Wolferman; United States	Jake Mageau; United States	Alex Hall; United States

Ref
