= Ben Barclay (freestyle skier) =

New Zealand freestyle skier (born 2002)

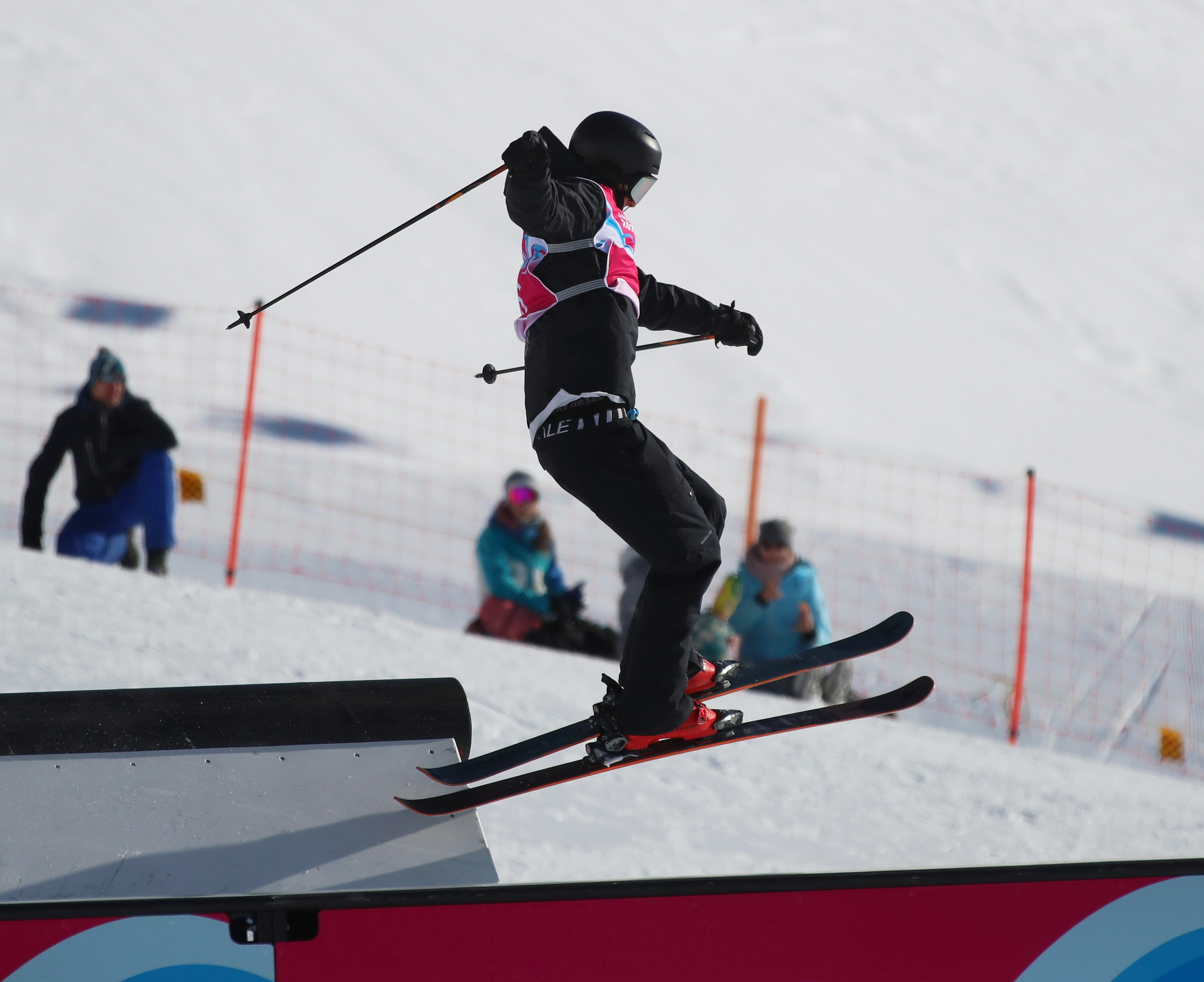
- Barclay in action during the 2020 Winter Youth Olympics

Personal information
- Full name: Benjamin Robert Barclay
- Born: 4 February 2002 (age 24) Auckland, New Zealand
- Height: 186 cm (6 ft 1 in)

Sport
- Country: New Zealand
- Sport: Freestyle skiing

Benjamin Robert Barclay (born 4 February 2002) is a New Zealand freestyle skier. He made represented New Zealand at the 2022 and 2026 Winter Olympics.

== Career ==
He represented New Zealand at the 2020 Winter Youth Olympics and competed in both boys' slopestyle and boys' big air events.

He competed in the men's ski slopestyle event at the FIS Freestyle Ski and Snowboarding World Championships 2021.

He claimed his career best second-place finish in slopestyle event in France clinching a silver medal at the 2021–22 FIS Freestyle Ski World Cup. His silver medal achievement at the Ski World Cup pushed him into contention for a late call-up with a possibility of being drafted into the New Zealand Olympic contingent.

He competed at the 2022 Winter Olympics and took part in both the men's slopestyle and men's big air events.
