= Andri Ragettli =

Swiss freestyle skier (born 1998)

Personal information
- Nationality: Swiss
- Born: 21 August 1998 (age 27) Flims, Switzerland
- Height: 184 cm (6 ft 0 in)
- Weight: 80 kg (176 lb)

Sport
- Country: Switzerland
- Sport: Freestyle skiing
- Event(s): Slopestyle, Big air
- Club: SC Flims
Medal record
Men's freestyle skiing
Representing Switzerland
World Championships
Gold medal – first place	2021 Aspen	Slopestyle
Bronze medal – third place	2023 Bakuriani	Slopestyle
Winter X Games
Gold medal – first place	2020 Norway	Slopestyle
Gold medal – first place	2021 Aspen	Big air
Gold medal – first place	2022 Aspen	Slopestyle
Bronze medal – third place	2018 Aspen	Slopestyle
Bronze medal – third place	2020 Aspen	Big air
Bronze medal – third place	2020 Norway	Big air

Andri Ragettli (born 21 August 1998) is a Swiss freestyle skier. He has won ten world cup titles and five crystal globes, including slopestyle in 2016, 2018, 2020 and 2022, as well as big air in 2019. He represented Switzerland in slopestyle at the 2018 Winter Olympics in Pyeongchang, where he qualified for the final, along with two fellow Swiss skiers, and finished 7th. Andri won his first X-Games gold medal at X-Games Norway 2020, which was his childhood dream. Since then he has added two more X-Games gold medals: one in big air (2021) and one in Slopestyle (2022). At the 2022 Winter Olympics in Beijing he qualified in first place for slopestyle finals but ended up 4th in the end.

He is the second skier to perform a quad cork, after Jackson Wells. He is the first skier to perform a quad cork 1800 on skis. At the 2019 Audi Nines he became the second person to perform a quad cork 1980 on skis, after fellow Swiss skier Fabian Bösch.

== Works ==
- Attack your dreams, Giger Verlag, 2022.
