= Colby Stevenson =

American freestyle skier

Personal information
- Born: October 3, 1997 (age 28) Portsmouth, New Hampshire, U.S.
- Height: 6 ft 1 in (185 cm)
- Weight: 170 lb (77 kg)

Sport
- Country: United States
- Sport: Freestyle skiing
- Event: Slopestyle
- Club: Park City Ski and Snowboard
Medal record
Men's freestyle skiing
Representing the United States
Olympic Games
Silver medal – second place	2022 Beijing	Big air
World Championships
Silver medal – second place	2021 Aspen	Slopestyle
Winter X Games
Gold medal – first place	2020 Aspen	Slopestyle
Gold medal – first place	2020 Aspen	Knuckle Huck
Gold medal – first place	2023 Aspen	Slopestyle
Bronze medal – third place	2023 Aspen	Knuckle Huck
Gold medal – first place	2024 Aspen	Knuckle Huck

Colby Stevenson (born October 3, 1997) is an American freestyle skier.

He competed at the FIS Freestyle Ski and Snowboarding World Championships 2021, winning the silver medal in the slopestyle event.

He competed at the 2022 Winter Olympics, winning silver in the Men's big air event.
