= Édouard Therriault =

Canadian freestyle skier (born 2003)

Personal information
- Nationality: Canadian
- Born: February 16, 2003 (age 23) Lorraine, Quebec

Sport
- Country: Canada
- Sport: Freestyle skiing
- Events: Slopestyle, Big air
Medal record
Men's freestyle skiing
Representing Canada
World Championships
Silver medal – second place	2021 Aspen	Big air

Édouard Therriault (born February 16, 2003) is a Canadian freestyle skier who competes internationally.

He competed in the FIS Freestyle Ski and Snowboarding World Championships 2021, where he won a silver medal in men's ski big air.

On January 24, 2022, Therriault was named to Canada's 2022 Olympic team.
