= Taisei Yamamoto =

Japanese freestyle skier (born 2001)

Personal information
- Born: 29 March 2001 (age 23); Tokyo

Sport
- Country: Japan
- Sport: Freestyle skiing
- Event: Slopestyle

Taisei Yamamoto (Japanese: 山本 泰成, Hepburn: Yamamoto Taisei, born 29 March 2001 in Tokyo) is a Japanese freestyle skier who competes internationally.

He became junior world champion in 2017, and participated in the 2018 Winter Olympics.
