= Leonardo Donaggio =

Italian freestyle skier (born 2003)

Personal information
- Born: 23 September 2003 (age 21); Lido di Venezia, Italy

Sport
- Country: Italy
- Sport: Freestyle skiing
- Event: Big air

Leonardo Donaggio (born 23 September 2003) is an Italian freestyle skier.

He competed in the big air at the 2022 Winter Olympics.
