= Alex Hall (skier) =

American freestyle skier (born 1998)

- Hall in 2026

Personal information
- Full name: Alexander Hall
- Born: September 21, 1998 (age 28) Fairbanks, Alaska, U.S.
- Education: The Winter Sports School in Park City
- Height: 6 ft 4 in (193 cm)
- Weight: 180 lb (82 kg)

Sport
- Country: United States
- Sport: Freestyle skiing
- Events: Slopestyle, Big Air
- Club: Park City Ski and Snowboard Club
Medal record
Men's freestyle skiing
Representing the United States
Olympic Games
| Gold medal – first place | 2022 Beijing | Slopestyle |
| Silver medal – second place | 2026 Milano Cortina | Slopestyle |
World Championships
| Bronze medal – third place | 2021 Aspen | Slopestyle |
| Bronze medal – third place | 2025 Engadin | Slopestyle |
Winter X Games
| Gold medal – first place | 2019 Aspen | Slopestyle |
| Gold medal – first place | 2019 Hafjell | Big Air |
| Gold medal – first place | 2020 Hafjell | Knuckle Huck |
| Gold medal – first place | 2021 Aspen | Real Ski |
| Gold medal – first place | 2022 Aspen | Big Air |
| Gold medal – first place | 2025 Aspen | Knuckle Huck |
| Gold medal – first place | 2026 Aspen | Knuckle Huck |
| Silver medal – second place | 2020 Hafjell | Slopestyle |
| Silver medal – second place | 2024 Aspen | Big Air |
| Silver medal – second place | 2024 Aspen | Slopestyle |
| Bronze medal – third place | 2021 Aspen | Big Air |
| Bronze medal – third place | 2022 Aspen | Slopestyle |
| Bronze medal – third place | 2022 Aspen | Knuckle Huck |
| Bronze medal – third place | 2026 Aspen | Slopestyle |
Youth Olympic Games
| Silver medal – second place | 2016 Lillehammer | Slopestyle |

Alexander Hall (born September 21, 1998), known colloquially as A Hall, is an American freestyle skier from Fairbanks, Alaska. Hall is a three-time Olympian, having won a gold medal at the Beijing Winter Olympics in 2022 and a silver medal at the Milano Cortina Winter Olympics in 2026, with both medals in Men's slopestyle skiing while competing for Team USA. He currently holds 14 medals from the Winter X Games, being the first to win all four divisions (Slopestyle, Big Air, Knuckle Huck, & Real Ski) as well as to land the first 2160 (6 full rotations) in competition.

== Career ==
Having moved to Switzerland at an early age, Hall then returned to the United States at age 16 to finish high school at the Winter Sports School in Park City. He started competing at the FIS World Cup level during the next season and was then invited to the 2016 Lillehammer Youth Olympics, where he placed second in Slopestyle and fourth in Halfpipe. At the end of the 2025 season, Hall had accumulated 16 World Cup podiums, including 10 first places, 2 Crystal Globes, and 2 World Championship bronze medals. Hall developed his early competitive acumen during the Swisscom Freeski Tour, as well as the U.S. Revolution Tour, experiencing an important break-out moment during the 2015 Dumont Cup (USA) by placing seventh in this Slopestyle event organized by the Association of Freeskiing Professionals (AFP). Hall became a member of the U.S. Ski & Snowboard Team at age 17, first joining the Development (Rookie) team before being promoted a year later to the Pro team. He placed sixteenth in Slopestyle at the 2018 Pyeongchang Winter Olympics, and first in Slopestyle and eighth in Big Air at the 2022 Beijing Winter Olympics. On February 10, 2026, Hall won silver in slopestyle skiing during the 2026 Winter Olympics, finishing with a score of 85.75 in the final. Hall currently rides for Samsung, Moncler, Rao's, Faction Skis, Monster Energy, Dalbello, Look Bindings, and Wells Lamont.

- Alex Hall's 2022 X Games 2160 jump
- Alex Hall's 2022 Olympic gold medal run
- Alex Hall's 2026 Olympic silver medal run

== Personal life ==
Hall credits much of his rising enthusiasm for the sport to attending Zurich’s annual freestyle.ch ski event with friends and older brother, Aldo, a snowboarder who also served as his first videographer while helping him secure initial sponsors that included Surface Skis, Panda Poles, Shred Optics, and Slytech. His parents, Elena Conti (an Italian citizen from Bologna) and Marcus Hall (a U.S. citizen from Salt Lake City) are both professors at the University of Zurich. When interviewed by USA Today in 2022, Alex Hall noted that he holds both Italian and U.S. passports, and once even talked "with Italian coaches about potentially competing for them" but that after moving to Park City at 16 he quickly realized he wanted to ski for the U.S. Alex Hall’s multi-country background means that beyond English, he speaks fluent German and Swiss German, and intermediate French and Italian. As a middle schooler at the Inter-Community School Zurich, Hall was voted Most Valuable basketball player, and also played as a football goalkeeper for the youth division of Grasshopper Club Zürich. Off the slopes, Alex Hall relaxes by surfing, golfing, tennis, fly fishing, and occasionally ceramics. By taking most of his college classes online, Hall was in 2026 a senior at the University of Utah, pursuing a Bachelor's degree in Environmental & Sustainability Studies.

== FIS World Cup Record ==
=== World Cup Crystal Globes ===
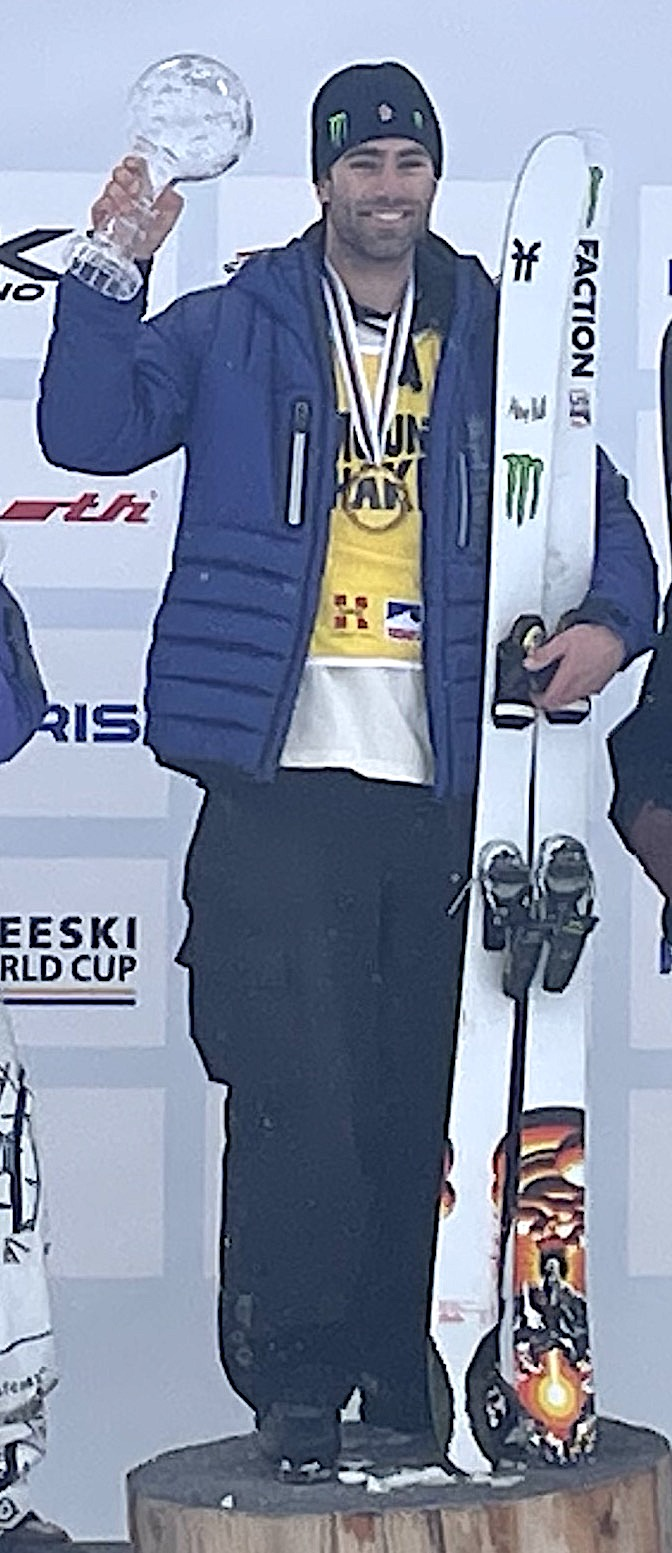
Alex Hall with Crystal Globe for Slopestyle FIS Freeski World Cup in Tignes France, 2025

| Season | Discipline |
| 2023–24 | Big Air |
| 2024–25 | Slopestyle |

=== World Cup Podiums ===
| Season | Podiums | | | | | | |
| Season | Slopestyle | | | Big Air | | | Total |
| Season | 1st place, gold medalist(s) | 2nd place, silver medalist(s) | 3rd place, bronze medalist(s) | 1st place, gold medalist(s) | 2nd place, silver medalist(s) | 3rd place, bronze medalist(s) | Σ |
| 2018 | 1 | | | | | | 1 |
| 2019 | 1 | | | | 1 | | 2 |
| 2020 | | | | 2 | | | 2 |
| 2021 | | | 1 | | | | 1 |
| 2022 | 1 | | | | 1 | | 2 |
| 2023 | | 1 | | | | | 1 |
| 2024 | 1 | | 1 | 2 | | | 4 |
| 2025 | 2 | | 1 | | | | 3 |
| Total | 6 | 1 | 3 | 4 | 2 | | 16 |

=== World Cup Victories ===
| Date | Place | Country | Discipline |
|---|---|---|---|
| March 3, 2018 | Silvaplana | Switzerland | SS |
| January 12, 2019 | Font-Romeu-Odeillo-Via | France | SS |
| November 3, 2019 | Modena | Italy | BA |
| December 21, 2019 | Atlanta | United States | BA |
| January 9, 2022 | Mammoth Mountain | United States | SS |
| December 2, 2023 | Beijing | China | BA |
| February 3, 2024 | Mammoth Mountain | United States | SS |
| March 15, 2024 | Tignes | France | BA |
| February 1, 2025 | Aspen | United States | SS |
| March 14, 2025 | Tignes | France | SS |

Legend:
SS = Slopestyle
BA = Big air

== Films and Filming ==
A Hall has taken center stage in a wide collection of ski films and magazines, including helping found the ski film brand Magma with fellow U.S. Ski Team member Hunter Hess and filmer Owen Dahlberg.

== Other Accolades ==
- First Place, QuickSnow Championships (Afriski, Lesotho - Africa), 2013
- First skier to land a Switch Triple Cork 1800 (Thredbo, Australia), 2016
- Winner, follow-cam freeski; best rail trick, best 540 Spring Battle (Flachauwinkl, Austria), 2016
- Winner of the Nanshan Freeski Open (Beijing), 2017
- Winner of Total Fight Freeski (Grandvalira, Spain), 2017
- 3 X Skier of the Year, presented by Newschoolers & Toyota, 2020 & 2022 & 2026
- Best 540, Spring Battle (Flachauwinkl, Austria), 2019
- Winner, Steel City Showdown (Seven Springs, Penn), 2020
- ESPYS nominee, Best Athlete, Men's Action Sports, 2022
- Utah Governor’s State of Sport Awards, Olympic Male Athlete of the Year, 2022
- Inductee, Forbes 30 Under 30: Sports, 2023.
- X Games Real Ski, Best Trick of All Time, for a Switch 630, 2023
- Stifel Star of the Week, Stifel Snow Show, 2025
- One of two, Athletes of the Year, Stifel U.S. Freeski Team, 2025
- 9 Podiums in the annual Dew Tour between 2018 and 2024, to include Slopestyle, Streetstyle, and Team events.
