= Javier Lliso =

Spanish freestyle skier

Personal information
- Born: 18 August 1997 (age 27); Madrid, Spain

Sport
- Country: Spain
- Sport: Freestyle skiing
- Event: Big air

Javier Lliso (born 18 August 1997) is a Spanish freestyle skier.

He competed in the men's big air and slopestyle competitions at the 2022 Winter Olympics in Beijing.
