= Lukas Müllauer =

Austrian freestyle skier

Personal information
- Born: 3 July 1997 (age 28) St. Johann, Austria
- Height: 1.76 m (5 ft 9 in)
- Weight: 72 kg (159 lb)

Sport
- Country: Austria
- Sport: Freestyle skiing
Medal record
Men's freestyle skiing
Representing Austria
World Championships
| Silver medal – second place | 2023 Bakuriani | Big air |

Lukas Müllauer (born 3 July 1997) is an Austrian freestyle skier. He competed in the 2018 Winter Olympics.
