= Henrik Harlaut =

Swedish freestyle skier (born 1991)

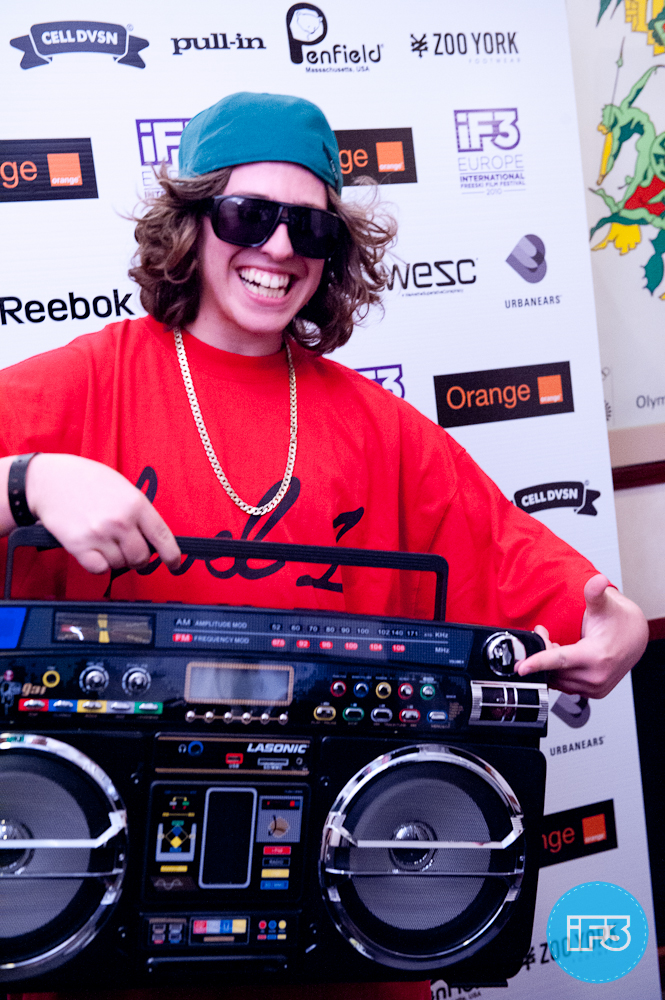
- Harlaut in 2011

Personal information
- Nicknames: E-dollo, Bloody Dollaz
- Born: 14 August 1991 (age 35) Stockholm, Sweden
- Height: 170 cm (5 ft 7 in)
- Weight: 64 kg (141 lb)

Sport
- Country: Sweden
- Sport: Freestyle skiing
- Events: Big Air, Slopestyle, Knuckle Huck
- Club: Harlaut Gang
Medal record
Men's freestyle skiing
Representing Sweden
Olympic Games
| Bronze medal – third place | 2022 Beijing | Big air |
World Championships
| Silver medal – second place | 2019 Utah | Big air |
Winter X Games
| Gold medal – first place | 2013 Aspen | Big Air |
| Gold medal – first place | 2014 Aspen | Big Air |
| Gold medal – first place | 2016 Oslo | Big Air |
| Gold medal – first place | 2017 Hafjell | Big Air |
| Gold medal – first place | 2018 Aspen | Big Air |
| Gold medal – first place | 2018 Aspen | Slopestyle |
| Gold medal – first place | 2020 Aspen | Big Air |
| Gold medal – first place | 2021 Aspen | Knuckle Huck |
| Silver medal – second place | 2013 Aspen | Slopestyle |
| Silver medal – second place | 2017 Aspen | Big Air |
| Silver medal – second place | 2019 Norway | Big Air |
| Silver medal – second place | 2024 Aspen | Knuckle Huck |

Henrik Harlaut (born 14 August 1991) is a Swedish freestyle skier. He was born in Stockholm and moved with his family to Åre at the age of nine. He lives in Andorra with his fiancé Andrea Marie Cadena and son Teo Wes Harlaut Cadena.

== Career ==
At the Winter X Games XVII in Aspen, Colorado, Harlaut won the gold medal in Big Air and the silver medal in slopestyle. In the Big Air final, he landed the first-ever "nose butter triple cork 1620" (a series of choreographed flips and spins he had not even tried himself before) and scored a perfect 50 points. He represented Sweden in slopestyle at the 2014 Winter Olympics in Sochi and 2018 Winter Olympics in PyeongChang.

Harlaut is well known for his unusual appearance. At the Winter Olympics in Sochi, he skied with "trousers round his knees and Teenage Mutant Ninja Turtle gloves", losing his trousers in the qualifying round in a "wardrobe malfunction"; as a result, he fell short of a medal and finished sixth. After his run, Harlaut gave the Wu-Tang Clan hand sign to the cameras and declared that "Wu-Tang is for the children", a reference to the words spoken by rapper Ol' Dirty Bastard when he interrupted the 1998 Grammy Awards on behalf of the group.
