= Fabian Bösch =

Swiss freestyle skier (born 1997)

Personal information
- Nationality: Swiss
- Born: 6 July 1997 (age 28) Hirschthal, Switzerland
- Height: 1.71 m (5 ft 7 in)
- Weight: 62 kg (137 lb)

Sport
- Country: Switzerland
- Sport: Freestyle skiing
- Event: Big air
- Club: SC Engelberg
Medal record
Men's freestyle skiing
Representing Switzerland
World Championships
Gold medal – first place	2015 Kreischberg	Slopestyle
Gold medal – first place	2019 Utah	Big air
Winter X Games
Gold medal – first place	2016 Aspen	Big air
Bronze medal – third place	2020 Norway	Slopestyle
Silver medal – second place	2016 Oslo	Big Air
Bronze medal – third place	2020 Aspen	Slopestyle

Fabian Bösch (born 6 July 1997) is a Swiss freestyle skier. He represented Switzerland at four Winter Olympics (2014, 2018, 2022, 2026).

== Career ==
He has won gold medals at both Winter X Games and World Championships. Fabian represented Switzerland in slopestyle at the 2014 Winter Olympics in Sochi and 2018 Winter Olympics in PyeongChang. He participated at the FIS Freestyle Ski and Snowboarding World Championships 2019, winning the gold medal in big air.
