= Kim Gubser =

Swiss freestyle skier (born 2000)

Personal information
- Nationality: Swiss
- Born: 17 May 2000 (age 26) Walenstadt, Switzerland
- Height: 1.69 m (5 ft 7 in)
- Weight: 64 kg (141 lb)

Sport
- Country: Switzerland
- Sport: Freestyle skiing
- Event(s): Slopestyle, Big air
- Club: Stützpunkt Davos
Medal record
Men's freestyle skiing
Representing Switzerland
World Championships
Bronze medal – third place	2021 Aspen	Big air

Kim Gubser (born 17 May 2000) is a Swiss freestyle skier who competes internationally. He represented Switzerland at the 2022 and 2026 Winter Olympics.

== Career ==
He competed in the FIS Freestyle Ski and Snowboarding World Championships 2021, where he won a bronze medal in men's ski big air.
