= Max Moffatt =

Canadian freestyle skier

Personal information
- Born: 27 June 1998 (age 28) Caledon, Ontario, Canada
- Home town: Calgary, Alberta
- Height: 183 cm (6 ft 0 in)
- Weight: 77 kg (170 lb)

Sport
- Country: Canada
- Sport: Freestyle skiing
- Events: Slopestyle, Big air
Medal record
Winter X Games
| Silver medal – second place | 2022 Aspen | Slopestyle |

Max Moffatt (born 27 June 1998) is a Canadian freestyle skier who competes internationally in the big air and slopestyle disciplines.

== Career ==
Moffatt joined the national team in 2014. In January 2019, Moffatt won his first World Cup medal, a gold, in the slopestyle event. In January 2022, Moffatt won the silver medal in the slopestyle at the 2022 Winter X Games.

On January 24, 2022, Moffatt was named to Canada's 2022 Olympic team in the big air and slopestyle events.

In 2024, Moffatt participated in Red Bull Unrailistic at Åre, Sweden.
