= Ferdinand Dahl =

Norwegian freestyle skier (born 1998)

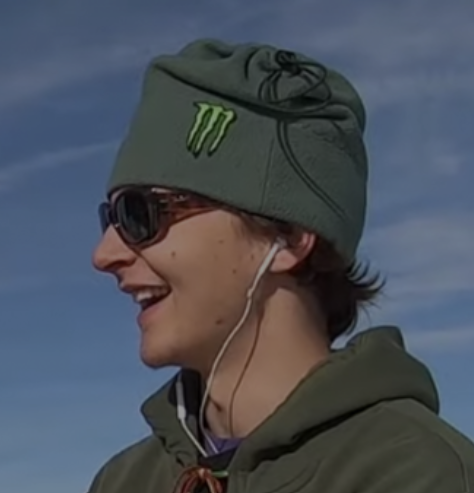

Personal information
- Nickname: Ferdi
- Born: 17 July 1998 (age 27) Oslo, Norway

Sport
- Country: Norway
- Sport: Freestyle skiing
- Event(s): Slopestyle, Big air

Achievements and titles
- World finals: 9 World Cup Podiums
- Highest world ranking: 2
Medal record
Men's freestyle skiing
Representing Norway
Winter X Games
Silver medal – second place	2021 Aspen	Slopestyle
Bronze medal – third place	2019 Aspen	Slopestyle
Bronze medal – third place	2023 Aspen	Slopestyle

Ferdinand Dahl (born 17 July 1998) is a Norwegian freestyle skier.

Ferdinand Dahl has 3 medals in X Games. He won bronze in slopestyle at Aspen in 2019, silver in slopestyle at Aspen in 2021, and bronze in slopestyle at Aspen in 2023. In January 2024, he secured victory in the X Games SLVSH Cup.

Dahl has achieved 9 podium finishes in the World Cup. He finished second overall in the World Cup Slopestyle rankings in 2018 and 2019.

He represented Norway in the 2018 Winter Olympics in Pyeongchang, where he placed 8th in slopestyle. He also represented Norway in the 2022 Winter Olympics in Beijing.

Ferdinand Dahl is one of the founders of Capeesh Supply who manufactures ski clothing and JibLeague, that organize freeski competitions in Europe and the USA.
