= FIS Freestyle Ski and Snowboarding World Championships 2021 =

2021 edition of the FIS Freestyle Ski and Snowboarding World Championships

- Host city: Idre (SX & SBX & BXT); Rogla (PS & PGS); Almaty (MO & DM & AE & AET); Aspen (SS, HP and BA of both SB and FS)
- Country: Sweden; Slovenia; Kazakhstan; USA
- Events: 28
- Opening: 11 February 2021 (ski-cross & snowboard-cross); 1 March 2021 (parallel and giant slalom); 8 March 2021 (moguls and aerials); 10 March 2021 (SS, HP and BA)
- Closing: 13 February 2021 (ski-cross & snowboard-cross); 2 March 2021 (parallel and giant slalom); 11 March 2021 (moguls and aerials); 16 March 2021 (SS, HP and BA)

Location of the FIS Freestyle Ski and Snowboarding World Championships 2021 venues.

The 2021 FIS Freestyle Ski and Snowboarding World Championships were held in Idre, Rogla, Almaty and Aspen with the ski and snowboard cross events held in Idre from 11 to 13 February 2021, the parallel and giant slalom snowboard in Rogla from 1 to 2 March 2021, moguls and aerials held in Almaty from 8 to 11 March 2021, slopestyle, halfpipe and big air events of both Snowboard and Freeski in Aspen from 10 to 16 March 2021. Calgary was selected as a replacement for China to host the halfpipe, big air and slopestyle events, but on 20 January 2021, they pulled out.

== Russia doping ban ==
On 9 December 2019, the World Anti-Doping Agency (WADA) banned Russia from all international sport for a period of four years, after the Russian government was found to have tampered with laboratory data that it provided to WADA in January 2019 as a condition of the Russian Anti-Doping Agency being reinstated. As a result of the ban, WADA plans to allow individually cleared Russian athletes to take part in the 2021-2022 World Championships and 2022 Summer Olympics under a neutral banner, as instigated at the 2018 Winter Olympics, but they will not be permitted to compete in team sports. The title of the neutral banner has yet to be determined; WADA Compliance Review Committee head Jonathan Taylor stated that the IOC would not be able to use "Olympic Athletes from Russia" (OAR) as it did in 2018, emphasizing that neutral athletes cannot be portrayed as representing a specific country. Russia later filed an appeal to the Court of Arbitration for Sport (CAS) against the WADA decision. After reviewing the case on appeal, CAS ruled on 17 December 2020 to reduce the penalty that WADA had placed on Russia. Instead of banning Russia from sporting events, the ruling allowed Russia to participate in the Olympics and other international events, but for a period of two years, the team cannot use the Russian name, flag, or anthem and must present themselves as "Neutral Athlete" or "Neutral Team". The ruling does allow for team uniforms to display "Russia" on the uniform as well as the use of the Russian flag colors within the uniform's design, although the name should be up to equal predominance as the "Neutral Athlete/Team" designation.

== Schedule ==
28 events were held.

Q	Qualification	F	Final

(Sweden) Idre
Event ↓ / Date →	9 Feb Tue	10 Feb Wed	11 Feb Thu	12 Feb Fri	13 Feb Sat
Freestyle skiing
Ski cross		Q			F
Snowboarding
Snowboard cross	Q		F		
Snowboard cross team				F	

(Slovenia) Rogla
Event ↓ / Date →	1 Mar Mon		2 Mar Tue	
Snowboarding
Parallel giant slalom	Q	F		
Parallel slalom			Q	F

(Kazakhstan) Almaty
Event ↓ / Date →	8 Mar Mon		9 Mar Tue		10 Mar Wed		11 Mar Thu
Freestyle skiing
Aerials					Q	F	
Team Aerials							F
Moguls	Q	F					
Dual moguls			Q	F			

(United States) Aspen
Event ↓ / Date →	10 Mar Wed	11 Mar Thu	12 Mar Fri	13 Mar Sat	14 Mar Sun	15 Mar Mon	16 Mar Tue
Freestyle skiing
Big air						Q	F
Halfpipe	Q		F				
Slopestyle		Q		F			
Snowboarding
Big air					Q		F
Halfpipe		Q		F			
Slopestyle	Q		F				

== Medal summary ==
=== Medal table ===
Rank	Nation	Gold	Silver	Bronze	Total
1	Russian Ski Federation	6	3	5	14
2	Canada	4	5	2	11
3	Switzerland	2	3	2	7
4	Australia	2	2	1	5
5	New Zealand	2	1	0	3
6	China	2	0	1	3
6	Sweden	2	0	1	3
8	United States	1	5	3	9
9	France	1	2	2	5
10	Austria	1	2	1	4
11	Germany	1	1	1	3
12	Japan	1	0	2	3
13	Great Britain	1	0	1	2
13	Norway	1	0	1	2
13	Spain	1	0	1	2
16	Italy	0	3	0	3
17	Kazakhstan	0	1	2	3
18	Czech Republic	0	0	1	1
18	Finland	0	0	1	1
Totals (19 entries)		28	28	28	84

=== Freestyle skiing ===
==== Men ====
Event	Gold		Silver		Bronze	
Ski cross	Alex Fiva; Switzerland		François Place; France		Erik Mobärg; Sweden	
Moguls	Mikaël Kingsbury; Canada	87.36	Benjamin Cavet; France	82.43	Pavel Kolmakov; Kazakhstan	82.23
Dual moguls	Mikaël Kingsbury; Canada		Matt Graham; Australia		Ikuma Horishima; Japan	
Aerials	Maxim Burov; Russian Ski Federation	135.00	Christopher Lillis; United States	133.50	Pavel Krotov; Russian Ski Federation	127.50
Slopestyle	Andri Ragettli; Switzerland	90.65	Colby Stevenson; United States	89.65	Alex Hall; United States	86.01
Halfpipe	Nico Porteous; New Zealand	94.50	Simon d'Artois; Canada	91.25	Birk Irving; United States	89.75
Big air	Oliwer Magnusson; Sweden	185.25	Édouard Therriault; Canada	183.00	Kim Gubser; Switzerland	180.75

==== Women ====
Event	Gold		Silver		Bronze	
Ski cross	Sandra Näslund; Sweden		Fanny Smith; Switzerland		Alizée Baron; France	
Moguls	Perrine Laffont; France	82.11	Yuliya Galysheva; Kazakhstan	79.52	Anastasia Smirnova; Russian Ski Federation	79.41
Dual moguls	Anastasia Smirnova; Russian Ski Federation		Viktoriia Lazarenko; Russian Ski Federation		Anastassiya Gorodko; Kazakhstan	
Aerials	Laura Peel; Australia	106.46	Ashley Caldwell; United States	101.74	Liubov Nikitina; Russian Ski Federation	94.47
Slopestyle	Gu Ailing; China	84.23	Mathilde Gremaud; Switzerland	77.15	Megan Oldham; Canada	76.18
Halfpipe	Gu Ailing; China	93.00	Rachael Karker; Canada	91.75	Zoe Atkin; Great Britain	90.50
Big air	Anastasia Tatalina; Russian Ski Federation	180.50	Lana Prusakova; Russian Ski Federation	165.50	Gu Ailing; China	161.50

==== Mixed ====
Event	Gold		Silver		Bronze	
Team aerials	Russian Ski Federation; Liubov Nikitina; Pavel Krotov; Maxim Burov	300.94	Switzerland; Carol Bouvard; Pirmin Werner; Noé Roth	293.46	United States; Ashley Caldwell; Eric Loughran; Christopher Lillis	283.97

=== Snowboarding ===
==== Men ====
Games	Gold		Silver		Bronze	
Snowboard cross	Lucas Eguibar; Spain		Alessandro Hämmerle; Austria		Éliot Grondin; Canada	
Parallel giant slalom	Dmitry Loginov; Russian Ski Federation		Roland Fischnaller; Italy		Andrey Sobolev; Russian Ski Federation	
Parallel slalom	Benjamin Karl; Austria		Andreas Prommegger; Austria		Dmitry Loginov; Russian Ski Federation	
Halfpipe	Yūto Totsuka; Japan	96.25	Scotty James; Australia	90.50	Jan Scherrer; Switzerland	87.00
Slopestyle	Marcus Kleveland; Norway	90.66	Sébastien Toutant; Canada	82.53	Rene Rinnekangas; Finland	82.51
Big air	Mark McMorris; Canada	179.25	Maxence Parrot; Canada	178.25	Marcus Kleveland; Norway	176.25

==== Women ====
Games	Gold		Silver		Bronze	
Snowboard cross	Charlotte Bankes; Great Britain		Michela Moioli; Italy		Eva Samková; Czech Republic	
Parallel giant slalom	Selina Jörg; Germany		Sofia Nadyrshina; Russian Ski Federation		Julia Dujmovits; Austria	
Parallel slalom	Sofia Nadyrshina; Russian Ski Federation		Ramona Theresia Hofmeister; Germany		Selina Jörg; Germany	
Halfpipe	Chloe Kim; United States	93.75	Maddie Mastro; United States	89.00	Queralt Castellet; Spain	87.50
Slopestyle	Zoi Sadowski-Synnott; New Zealand	85.95	Jamie Anderson; United States	81.10	Tess Coady; Australia	78.13
Big air	Laurie Blouin; Canada	177.75	Zoi Sadowski-Synnott; New Zealand	176.75	Miyabi Onitsuka; Japan	174.75

==== Mixed ====
Games	Gold	Silver	Bronze
Snowboard cross team	Australia; Jarryd Hughes; Belle Brockhoff	Italy; Lorenzo Sommariva; Michela Moioli	France; Léo Le Blé Jaques; Julia Pereira de Sousa Mabileau
