= Oliwer Magnusson =

Swedish freestyle skier (born 2000)

Personal information
- Full name: Isak Oliwer Magnusson
- Nationality: Swedish
- Born: 3 June 2000 (age 26) Östersund, Sweden
- Height: 1.85 m (6 ft 1 in)
- Weight: 80 kg (176 lb)

Sport
- Country: Sweden
- Sport: Freestyle skiing
- Event(s): Slopestyle, Big air
- Club: Östersund FS
Medal record
Men's freestyle skiing
Representing Sweden
World Championships
Gold medal – first place	2021 Aspen	Big air

Oliwer Magnusson (born 3 June 2000) is a Swedish freestyle skier who competes internationally.

Magnusson has competed in the FIS Freestyle World Ski Championships since 2017, and participated in the 2018 as well as the 2022 Winter Olympics.
