= Evan McEachran =

Canadian freestyle skier (born 1997)

Personal information
- Nationality: Canadian
- Born: March 6, 1997 (age 29) Oakville, Ontario
- Height: 186 cm (6 ft 1 in)

Sport
- Country: Canada
- Sport: Freestyle skiing
- Events: Slopestyle, Big air

Evan McEachran (born March 6, 1997) is a Canadian freeskier from Ontario, Canada. He is a member of the Canadian Slopestyle Ski Team. Evan represented Canada at three Winter Olympics (2018, 2022, 2026).

In slopestyle at the 2018 Winter Olympics in PyeongChang, he qualified for the final along with two fellow Canadian skiers and finished sixth.

On January 24, 2022, McEachran was named to Canada's 2022 Olympic team.
