= Biathlon at the 2022 Winter Olympics – Women's mass start =

Women’s mass start at the XXIV Olympic Winter Games
- Biathlon
- Venue: Hualindong Ski Resort
- Date: 18 February 2022
- Competitors: 30 from 15 nations
- Winning time: 40:18.0

Medalists
1st place, gold medalist(s)		Justine Braisaz-Bouchet	France
2nd place, silver medalist(s)		Tiril Eckhoff	Norway
3rd place, bronze medalist(s)		Marte Olsbu Røiseland	Norway

The Women's mass start competition of the Beijing 2022 Olympics was held on 18 February, at the National Biathlon Centre, in the Zhangjiakou cluster of competition venues, 180 kilometres (110 mi) north of Beijing, at an elevation of 1,665 metres (5,463 ft). Justine Braisaz-Bouchet of France won the event. It was her first individual Olympic medal. Tiril Eckhoff of Norway won the silver medal, and Marte Olsbu Røiseland, also of Norway, bronze.

== Summary ==
The 2018 champion, Anastasiya Kuzmina, and the silver medalist, Darya Domracheva, retired from competitions. The 2014 and 2018 bronze medalist, Eckhoff, dominated the 2020–21 Biathlon World Cup, winning not only overall but also sprint and pursuit. The overall leader of the 2021–22 Biathlon World Cup before the Olympics was Olsbu Røiseland, and the leader in mass start was Dorothea Wierer. Olsbu Røiseland won the sprint and pursuit races at the 2022 Olympics.

== Results ==
The race was started at 15:00.

Rank	Bib	Name	Country	Time	Penalties (P+P+S+S)	Deficit
1st place, gold medalist(s)	10	Justine Braisaz-Bouchet	France	40:18.0	4 (2+1+0+1)	
2nd place, silver medalist(s)	6	Tiril Eckhoff	Norway	40:33.3	4 (0+0+2+2)	+15.3
3rd place, bronze medalist(s)	2	Marte Olsbu Røiseland	Norway	40:52.9	4 (0+0+2+2)	+34.9
4	13	Markéta Davidová	Czech Republic	41:11.4	4 (1+0+1+2)	+53.4
5	15	Kristina Reztsova	ROC	41:29.0	6 (2+1+1+2)	+1:11.0
6	14	Julia Simon	France	41:40.6	6 (0+1+3+2)	+1:22.6
7	19	Yuliia Dzhima	Ukraine	41:43.7	3 (1+0+2+0)	+1:25.7
8	25	Franziska Preuß	Germany	41:44.4	4 (1+1+1+1)	+1:26.4
9	4	Elvira Öberg	Sweden	41:55.7	4 (1+0+0+3)	+1:37.7
10	11	Hanna Sola	Belarus	41:57.2	8 (2+2+1+3)	+1:39.2
11	8	Lisa Theresa Hauser	Austria	42:07.6	4 (0+1+1+2)	+1:49.6
12	7	Dzinara Alimbekava	Belarus	42:19.2	6 (1+1+2+2)	+2:01.2
13	1	Denise Herrmann	Germany	42:27.1	5 (1+1+1+2)	+2:09.1
14	24	Katharina Innerhofer	Austria	42:42.7	6 (1+0+2+3)	+2:24.7
15	27	Vanessa Hinz	Germany	43:12.2	4 (0+0+2+2)	+2:54.2
16	26	Lena Häcki	Switzerland	43:14.2	9 (0+3+3+3)	+2:56.2
17	23	Uliana Nigmatullina	ROC	43:14.3	6 (2+1+3+0)	+2:56.3
18	17	Vanessa Voigt	Germany	43:22.7	6 (1+2+2+1)	+3:04.7
19	3	Anaïs Chevalier-Bouchet	France	43:29.7	5 (2+0+2+1)	+3:11.7
20	30	Irina Kazakevich	ROC	43:34.6	7 (1+3+2+1)	+3:16.6
21	16	Mona Brorsson	Sweden	43:37.4	6 (2+1+2+1)	+3:19.4
22	5	Dorothea Wierer	Italy	43:41.0	8 (2+2+2+2)	+3:23.0
23	29	Deedra Irwin	United States	43:42.1	6 (1+3+1+1)	+3:24.1
24	18	Linn Persson	Sweden	43:46.6	8 (0+2+3+3)	+3:28.6
25	9	Hanna Öberg	Sweden	44:03.2	7 (0+3+1+3)	+3:45.2
26	22	Paulína Fialková	Slovakia	44:04.8	8 (0+3+1+4)	+3:46.8
27	20	Monika Hojnisz-Staręga	Poland	44:06.6	8 (2+3+1+2)	+3:48.6
28	28	Lucie Charvátová	Czech Republic	44:28.7	5 (0+2+2+1)	+4:10.7
29	12	Anaïs Bescond	France	46:02.3	10 (0+2+3+5)	+5:44.3
30	21	Alina Stremous	Moldova	47:30.0	9 (1+2+3+3)	+7:12.0
