= Biathlon at the 2022 Winter Olympics – Women's pursuit =

Women’s pursuit at the XXIV Olympic Winter Games
- Biathlon
- Venue: Hualindong Ski Resort
- Date: 13 February 2022
- Competitors: 57 from 25 nations
- Winning time: 34:46.9

Medalists
1st place, gold medalist(s)		Marte Olsbu Røiseland	Norway
2nd place, silver medalist(s)		Elvira Öberg	Sweden
3rd place, bronze medalist(s)		Tiril Eckhoff	Norway

The Women's pursuit competition of the Beijing 2022 Olympics was held on 13 February, at the National Biathlon Centre, in the Zhangjiakou cluster of competition venues, 180 kilometres (110 mi) north of Beijing, at an elevation of 1,665 metres (5,463 ft). Marte Olsbu Røiseland of Norway won the event. Elvira Öberg of Sweden won the silver medal, and Tiril Eckhoff of Norway the bronze.

== Summary ==
The 2018 champion, Laura Dahlmeier, and the silver medalist, Anastasiya Kuzmina, retired from competitions. The 2018 bronze medalist, Anaïs Bescond, qualified for the Olympics, but in the 2021–22 Biathlon World Cup ranking before the Olympics she was tenth. The overall leader of the 2021–22 Biathlon World Cup before the Olympics, as well as the leader in the pursuit, was Olsbu Røiseland.

Olsbu Røiseland, who won the sprint, started first, did not miss a target at two shootings, and missed one target on the third one. At the third shooting, her next pursuer, Wierer, was already 45 seconds behind, and missed two targets, dropping down to 1:25. They were followed by Lisa Theresa Hauser and Ingrid Landmark Tandrevold 1:40 behind Olsbu Røiseland. At the fourth shooting, Olsbu Røiseland did not miss targets, which guaranteed her the gold medal. Silver and bronze remained open until very late in the race. Öberg, who left the shooting second behind Olsbu Røiseland, finished second, but Tandrevold who was a few seconds behind Öberg in a bronze medal position, collapsed and dropped out of the top ten. Eckhoff finished third.

== Results ==
The race was started at 17:00. The race distance was 10km.

Rank	Bib	Name	Country	Start	Time	Penalties (P+P+S+S)	Deficit
1st place, gold medalist(s)	1	Marte Olsbu Røiseland	Norway	0:00	34:46.9	1 (0+0+1+0)	
2nd place, silver medalist(s)	2	Elvira Öberg	Sweden	0:31	36:23.4	3 (0+1+2+0)	+1:36.5
3rd place, bronze medalist(s)	11	Tiril Eckhoff	Norway	1:16	36:35.6	3 (1+1+0+1)	+1:48.7
4	26	Hanna Sola	Belarus	1:52	36:45.8	3 (1+1+1+0)	+1:58.9
5	12	Linn Persson	Sweden	1:20	36:54.1	2 (0+0+1+1)	+2:07.2
6	3	Dorothea Wierer	Italy	0:37	36:56.0	3 (0+0+2+1)	+2:09.1
7	4	Lisa Theresa Hauser	Austria	0:47	36:56.7	2 (0+0+1+1)	+2:09.8
8	29	Julia Simon	France	1:56	37:05.2	2 (0+1+1+0)	+2:18.3
9	16	Monika Hojnisz-Staręga	Poland	1:29	37:15.7	2 (2+0+0+0)	+2:28.8
10	14	Paulína Fialková	Slovakia	1:28	37:25.7	2 (0+2+0+0)	+2:38.8
11	13	Uliana Nigmatullina	ROC	1:28	37:33.2	3 (0+2+1+0)	+2:46.3
12	18	Vanessa Voigt	Germany	1:31	37:35.3	1 (1+0+0+0)	+2:48.4
13	8	Yuliia Dzhima	Ukraine	1:08	37:36.2	4 (1+0+1+2)	+2:49.3
14	5	Ingrid Landmark Tandrevold	Norway	1:00	37:39.9	1 (0+0+1+0)	+2:53.0
15	30	Franziska Preuß	Germany	1:57	37:45.6	1 (1+0+0+0)	+2:58.7
16	10	Alina Stremous	Moldova	1:15	38:01.3	2 (0+0+1+1)	+3:14.4
17	22	Denise Herrmann	Germany	1:45	38:07.6	3 (0+1+0+2)	+3:20.7
18	19	Hanna Öberg	Sweden	1:35	38:11.3	6 (1+0+3+2)	+3:24.4
19	15	Dzinara Alimbekava	Belarus	1:29	38:13.7	3 (0+0+3+0)	+3:26.8
20	60	Iryna Leshchanka	Belarus	2:48	38:16.9	2 (0+0+0+2)	+3:30.0
21	55	Vanessa Hinz	Germany	2:40	38:21.0	1 (0+0+0+1)	+3:34.1
22	21	Katharina Innerhofer	Austria	1:42	38:24.7	3 (0+0+1+2)	+3:37.8
23	20	Irina Kazakevich	ROC	1:39	38:25.8	3 (0+0+2+1)	+3:38.9
24	23	Lena Häcki	Switzerland	1:46	38:27.5	4 (2+0+1+1)	+3:40.6
25	24	Anastasiya Merkushyna	Ukraine	1:47	38:37.2	2 (1+0+0+1)	+3:50.3
26	6	Kristina Reztsova	ROC	1:05	38:41.6	7 (2+2+1+2)	+3:54.7
27	9	Anaïs Bescond	France	1:09	38:46.4	5 (2+0+1+2)	+3:59.5
28	41	Markéta Davidová	Czech Republic	2:28	38:49.8	4 (1+1+1+1)	+4:02.9
29	34	Joanne Reid	United States	2:11	39:06.7	3 (0+0+0+3)	+4:19.8
30	28	Mari Eder	Finland	1:56	39:15.6	4 (0+1+1+2)	+4:28.7
31	17	Milena Todorova	Bulgaria	1:31	39:20.6	6 (0+0+2+4)	+4:33.7
32	36	Lisa Vittozzi	Italy	2:25	39:21.2	4 (1+2+0+1)	+4:34.3
33	38	Ida Lien	Norway	2:26	39:22.1	4 (0+1+2+1)	+4:35.2
34	25	Lucie Charvátová	Czech Republic	1:51	39:43.2	4 (2+1+0+1)	+4:56.3
35	31	Jessica Jislová	Czech Republic	1:58	39:54.5	2 (0+1+0+1)	+5:07.6
36	42	Ivona Fialková	Slovakia	2:28	40:06.3	7 (0+4+1+2)	+5:19.4
37	57	Samuela Comola	Italy	2:46	40:10.4	3 (0+1+1+1)	+5:23.5
38	46	Clare Egan	United States	2:32	40:17.0	4 (0+0+2+2)	+5:30.1
39	54	Amy Baserga	Switzerland	2:40	40:18.0	3 (1+0+1+1)	+5:31.1
40	27	Susan Dunklee	United States	1:55	40:18.9	3 (0+0+2+1)	+5:32.0
41	47	Svetlana Mironova	ROC	2:33	40:25.4	6 (0+0+1+5)	+5:38.5
42	39	Fuyuko Tachizaki	Japan	2:27	40:27.8	3 (0+1+1+1)	+5:40.9
43	51	Suvi Minkkinen	Finland	2:37	40:38.0	0 (0+0+0+0)	+5:51.1
44	45	Julia Schwaiger	Austria	2:32	40:42.2	3 (0+0+1+2)	+5:55.3
45	44	Susan Külm	Estonia	2:31	40:57.3	3 (1+1+1+0)	+6:10.4
46	7	Anna Magnusson	Sweden	1:06	40:59.9	6 (1+3+0+2)	+6:13.0
47	37	Deedra Irwin	United States	2:26	41:01.0	4 (0+0+1+3)	+6:14.1
48	50	Baiba Bendika	Latvia	2:36	41:11.9	6 (2+1+2+1)	+6:25.0
49	33	Tuuli Tomingas	Estonia	2:05	41:12.2	7 (0+2+3+2)	+6:25.3
50	56	Regina Oja	Estonia	2:40	41:14.5	5 (3+1+0+1)	+6:27.6
51	59	Polona Klemenčič	Slovenia	2:47	41:31.5	4 (0+1+2+1)	+6:44.6
52	52	Galina Vishnevskaya-Sheporenko	Kazakhstan	2:38	41:47.9	4 (1+0+0+3)	+7:01.0
53	35	Tang Jialin	China	2:19	41:48.3	4 (1+0+1+2)	+7:01.4
54	32	Emma Lunder	Canada	2:03	42:19.3	7 (1+3+2+1)	+7:32.4
55	40	Iryna Petrenko	Ukraine	2:27	43:03.7	4 (1+1+2+0)	+8:16.8
	49	Ekaterina Avvakumova	South Korea	2:35	LAP	(3+4+ + )	
	58	Tereza Voborníková	Czech Republic	2:47	LAP	(4+0+3+ )	
	43	Johanna Talihärm	Estonia	Did not start			
	48	Justine Braisaz-Bouchet	France	Did not start			
	53	Kamila Żuk	Poland	Did not start			
