= Germany at the 2022 Winter Olympics =

- Flag of Germany
- IOC code: GER
- NOC: German Olympic Sports Confederation
- Website: www.dosb.de (in German)

in Beijing, China 4–20 February 2022
- Competitors: 149 (98 men and 51 women) in 14 sports
- Flag bearers (opening): Francesco Friedrich; Claudia Pechstein
- Flag bearer (closing): Thorsten Margis
- Medals Ranked 2nd: Gold 12 Silver 10 Bronze 5 Total 27

Winter Olympics appearances (overview)
- 1928; 1932; 1936; 1948; 1952; 1956–1988; 1992; 1994; 1998; 2002; 2006; 2010; 2014; 2018; 2022; 2026

Other related appearances
- United Team of Germany (1956–1964); East Germany (1968–1988); West Germany (1968–1988)

Germany competed at the 2022 Winter Olympics in Beijing, China, from 4 to 20 February 2022.

Bobsledder Francesco Friedrich and speed skater Claudia Pechstein were the country's flagbearers during the opening ceremony. Meanwhile, bobsledder Thorsten Margis was the country's flagbearer during the closing ceremony.

Germany finished in the second place at these Olympics. Overall, the nation won 12 gold and 27 total medals, compared to 14 gold and 31 overall in 2018.

== Medalists ==
The following German competitors won medals at the Games. In the discipline sections below, the medalists' names are bolded.

Medals by sport
**Sport**	1st place, gold medalist(s)	2nd place, silver medalist(s)	3rd place, bronze medalist(s)	Total
Alpine skiing	0	1	0	1
Biathlon	1	0	1	2
Bobsleigh	3	3	1	7
Cross-country skiing	1	1	0	2
Freestyle skiing	0	0	1	1
Luge	4	2	0	6
Nordic combined	1	1	0	2
Skeleton	2	1	0	3
Ski jumping	0	1	2	3
Total	12	10	5	27

Medals by date
**Day**	**Date**	1st place, gold medalist(s)	2nd place, silver medalist(s)	3rd place, bronze medalist(s)	Total
Day 1	5 February	0	1	0	1
Day 2	6 February	1	0	0	1
Day 3	7 February	1	0	0	1
Day 4	8 February	1	1	0	2
Day 5	9 February	2	1	0	3
Day 6	10 February	1	0	0	1
Day 7	11 February	1	1	0	2
Day 8	12 February	1	1	1	3
Day 9	13 February	0	0	0	0
Day 10	14 February	0	0	1	1
Day 11	15 February	1	1	1	3
Day 12	16 February	1	0	1	2
Day 13	17 February	0	1	1	2
Day 14	18 February	0	0	0	0
Day 15	19 February	1	1	0	2
Day 16	20 February	1	2	0	3
Total		12	10	5	27

Medals by gender
**Gender**	1st place, gold medalist(s)	2nd place, silver medalist(s)	3rd place, bronze medalist(s)	**Total**
Male	6	5	3	**14**
Female	5	4	2	**11**
Mixed	1	1	0	**2**
Total	12	10	5	27

Multiple medalists
**Name**	**Sport**	1st place, gold medalist(s)	2nd place, silver medalist(s)	3rd place, bronze medalist(s)	Total
Denise Herrmann	Biathlon	1	0	1	2
Francesco Friedrich	Bobsleigh	2	0	0	2
Thorsten Margis	Bobsleigh	2	0	0	2
Florian Bauer	Bobsleigh	0	2	0	2
Johannes Lochner	Bobsleigh	0	2	0	2
Victoria Carl	Cross-country skiing	1	1	0	2
Katharina Hennig	Cross-country skiing	1	1	0	2
Tobias Arlt	Luge	2	0	0	2
Natalie Geisenberger	Luge	2	0	0	2
Johannes Ludwig	Luge	2	0	0	2
Tobias Wendl	Luge	2	0	0	2
Vinzenz Geiger	Nordic combined	1	1	0	2
Karl Geiger	Ski jumping	0	0	2	2

Medal	Name	Sport	Event	Date
Gold	Johannes Ludwig	Luge	Men's singles	6 February
Gold	Denise Herrmann	Biathlon	Women's individual	7 February
Gold	Natalie Geisenberger	Luge	Women's singles	8 February
Gold	Vinzenz Geiger	Nordic combined	Individual normal hill/10 km	9 February
Gold	Tobias Wendl; Tobias Arlt	Luge	Doubles	9 February
Gold	Natalie Geisenberger; Johannes Ludwig; Tobias Wendl; Tobias Arlt	Luge	Team relay	10 February
Gold	Christopher Grotheer	Skeleton	Men's	11 February
Gold	Hannah Neise	Skeleton	Women's	12 February
Gold	Francesco Friedrich; Thorsten Margis	Bobsleigh	Two-man	15 February
Gold	Katharina Hennig; Victoria Carl	Cross-country skiing	Women's team sprint	16 February
Gold	Laura Nolte; Deborah Levi	Bobsleigh	Two-woman	19 February
Gold	Francesco Friedrich; Thorsten Margis; Candy Bauer; Alexander Schüller	Bobsleigh	Four-man	20 February
Silver	Katharina Althaus	Ski jumping	Women's normal hill individual	5 February
Silver	Anna Berreiter	Luge	Women's singles	8 February
Silver	Toni Eggert; Sascha Benecken	Luge	Doubles	9 February
Silver	Axel Jungk	Skeleton	Men's	11 February
Silver	Katherine Sauerbrey; Katharina Hennig; Victoria Carl; Sofie Krehl	Cross-country skiing	Women's 4 × 5 km relay	12 February
Silver	Johannes Lochner; Florian Bauer	Bobsleigh	Two-man	15 February
Silver	Manuel Faißt; Eric Frenzel; Vinzenz Geiger; Julian Schmid	Nordic combined	Team large hill/4 × 5 km	17 February
Silver	Mariama Jamanka; Alexandra Burghardt	Bobsleigh	Two-woman	19 February
Silver	Emma Aicher; Lena Dürr; Julian Rauchfuß; Alexander Schmid; Linus Straßer	Alpine skiing	Mixed team	20 February
Silver	Johannes Lochner; Florian Bauer; Christopher Weber; Christian Rasp	Bobsleigh	Four-man	20 February
Bronze	Karl Geiger	Ski jumping	Men's large hill individual	12 February
Bronze	Constantin Schmid; Stephan Leyhe; Markus Eisenbichler; Karl Geiger	Ski jumping	Men's large hill team	14 February
Bronze	Christoph Hafer; Matthias Sommer	Bobsleigh	Two-man	15 February
Bronze	Vanessa Voigt; Vanessa Hinz; Franziska Preuß; Denise Herrmann	Biathlon	Women's relay	16 February
Bronze	Daniela Maier	Freestyle skiing	Women's ski cross	17 February

== Competitors ==
The following is the list of number of competitors participating at the Games per sport/discipline.

Sport	Men	Women	Total
Alpine skiing	8	5	13
Biathlon	6	5	11
Bobsleigh	12	6	18
Cross-country skiing	6	8	14
Freestyle skiing	4	5	9
Figure skating	3	3	6
Ice hockey	25	0	25
Luge	7	3	10
Nordic combined	5	—N/a	5
Short track speed skating	0	1	1
Skeleton	3	3	6
Ski jumping	5	4	9
Snowboarding	11	6	17
Speed skating	3	2	5
Total	98	51	149

== Alpine skiing ==
By meeting the basic qualification standards, Germany has qualified at least one male and one female alpine skier.

DOSB announced the 7 men and 3 women participating on 19 January 2022.

Men

Athlete	Event	Run 1		Run 2		Total	
Athlete	Event	Time	Rank	Time	Rank	Time	Rank
Romed Baumann	Downhill	—N/a				1:43.84	13
Romed Baumann	Super-G	—N/a				1:21.10	7
Josef Ferstl	Downhill	—N/a				1:44.69	23
Josef Ferstl	Super-G	—N/a				1:22.16	18
Simon Jocher	Combined	1:45.80	16	DNF			
Simon Jocher	Super-G	—N/a				1:21.52	13
Julian Rauchfuß	Giant slalom	1:08.23	30	1:07.99	15	2:16.22	20
Julian Rauchfuß	Slalom	DNF					
Andreas Sander	Downhill	—N/a				1:44.12	17
Andreas Sander	Super-G	—N/a				1:21.21	8
Alexander Schmid	Giant slalom	DNF					
Alexander Schmid	Slalom	55.95	23	51.08	21	1:47.03	19
Dominik Schwaiger	Downhill	—N/a				DNF	
Linus Straßer	Giant slalom	DNF					
Linus Straßer	Slalom	54.25	5	50.77	12	1:45.02	7

Women

Athlete	Event	Run 1		Run 2		Total	
Athlete	Event	Time	Rank	Time	Rank	Time	Rank
Emma Aicher	Giant slalom	1:01.52	30	59.00	18	2:00.52	21
Emma Aicher	Slalom	54.48	21	53.11	12	1:47.59	18
Lena Dürr	Slalom	52.17	1	53.00	9	1:45.17	4
Kira Weidle	Downhill	—N/a				1:32.58	4
Kira Weidle	Super-G	—N/a				1:14.66	15

Mixed

Athlete	Event	Round of 16	Quarterfinals	Semifinals	Final / BM	
Athlete	Event	Opposition Result	Opposition Result	Opposition Result	Opposition Result	Rank
Emma Aicher; Lena Dürr; Julian Rauchfuß; Alexander Schmid; Linus Straßer	Team	Sweden; W 3–1	Switzerland; W 2*–2	United States; W 3–1	Austria; L 2–2*	2nd place, silver medalist(s)

== Biathlon ==
Based on their Nations Cup rankings in the 2020–21 Biathlon World Cup and 2021–22 Biathlon World Cup, Germany has qualified a team of 6 men and 5 women.

DOSB announced the 6 men and 5 women participating on 19 January 2022.

Men

Athlete	Event	Time	Misses	Rank
Benedikt Doll	Sprint	25:05.4	1 (0+1)	8
Johannes Kühn	Sprint	25:53.7	4 (2+2)	33
Philipp Nawrath	Sprint	25:43.4	3 (1+2)	22
Roman Rees	Sprint	25:24.3	0 (0+0)	17
Benedikt Doll	Pursuit	44:03.1	7 (2+0+2+3)	32
Johannes Kühn	Pursuit	42:37.3	4 (0+2+1+1)	12
Philipp Nawrath	Pursuit	43:06.7	7 (1+2+1+3)	19
Roman Rees	Pursuit	41:37.7	1 (0+1+0+0)	6
Benedikt Doll	Mass start	40:45.8	6 (0+0+2+4)	8
Johannes Kühn	Mass start	40:52.7	5 (1+0+2+2)	10
Philipp Nawrath	Mass start	42:10.1	7 (0+0+3+4)	23
Roman Rees	Mass start	41:05.2	3 (0+0+1+2)	14
Benedikt Doll	Individual	49:54.5	2 (1+0+0+1)	6
Johannes Kühn	Individual	54:58.0	6 (3+2+1+0)	51
Erik Lesser	Individual	55:59.5	5 (0+2+0+3)	67
Roman Rees	Individual	50:09.0	1 (1+0+0+0)	7
Erik Lesser; Roman Rees; Benedikt Doll; Philipp Nawrath	Relay	1:20:54.5	10 (1+9)	4

Women

Athlete	Event	Time	Misses	Rank
Denise Herrmann	Sprint	22:29.4	2 (1+1)	22
Vanessa Hinz	Sprint	23:31.3	3 (1+2)	55
Franziska Preuß	Sprint	22:41.4	2 (0+2)	30
Vanessa Voigt	Sprint	22:15.7	0 (0+0)	18
Denise Herrmann	Pursuit	38:07.6	3 (1+0+0+2)	17
Vanessa Hinz	Pursuit	38:21.0	1 (0+0+0+1)	21
Franziska Preuß	Pursuit	37:45.6	1 (1+0+0+0)	15
Vanessa Voigt	Pursuit	37:35.3	1 (1+0+0+0)	12
Denise Herrmann	Mass start	42:27.1	4 (1+1+1+1)	13
Vanessa Hinz	Mass start	43:12.2	4 (0+0+2+2)	15
Franziska Preuß	Mass start	41:44.4	4 (1+1+1+1)	8
Vanessa Voigt	Mass start	43:22.7	6 (1+2+2+1)	18
Denise Herrmann	Individual	44:12.7	1 (0+0+1+0)	1st place, gold medalist(s)
Vanessa Hinz	Individual	46:07.4	1 (0+1+0+0)	14
Franziska Preuß	Individual	48:04.2	4 (0+2+0+2)	25
Vanessa Voigt	Individual	44:29.3	1 (1+0+0+0)	4
Vanessa Voigt; Vanessa Hinz; Franziska Preuß; Denise Herrmann	Relay	1:11:41.3	6 (0+6)	3rd place, bronze medalist(s)

Mixed

Athlete	Event	Time	Misses	Rank
Vanessa Voigt; Denise Herrmann; Benedikt Doll; Philipp Nawrath	Relay	1:07:51.1	20 (2+18)	5

== Bobsleigh ==
Based on their rankings in the 2021–22 Bobsleigh World Cup, Germany qualified 11 sleds. DOSB announced the competing athletes on 19 January 2022.

Men

Athlete	Event	Run 1		Run 2		Run 3		Run 4		Total	
Athlete	Event	Time	Rank	Time	Rank	Time	Rank	Time	Rank	Time	Rank
Francesco Friedrich*; Thorsten Margis	Two-man	59.02	1	59.36	2	58.99	1	59.52	1	3:56.89	1st place, gold medalist(s)
Christoph Hafer*; Matthias Sommer	Two-man	59.44	4	59.93	6	59.51	3	59.70	3	3:58.58	3rd place, bronze medalist(s)
Johannes Lochner*; Florian Bauer	Two-man	59.26	2	59.27	1	59.32	2	59.53	2	3:57.38	2nd place, silver medalist(s)
Francesco Friedrich*; Candy Bauer; Thorsten Margis; Alexander Schüller	Four-man	58.29	2	58.71	1	58.17	1	59.13	1	3:54.30	1st place, gold medalist(s)
Christoph Hafer*; Michael Salzer; Tobias Schneider; Matthias Sommer	Four-man	58.60	5	58.95	4	58.35	3	59.25	2	3:55.15	4
Johannes Lochner*; Florian Bauer; Christian Rasp; Christopher Weber	Four-man	58.13	1	58.90	3	58.34	2	59.30	5	3:54.67	2nd place, silver medalist(s)

Women

Athlete	Event	Run 1		Run 2		Run 3		Run 4		Total	
Athlete	Event	Time	Rank	Time	Rank	Time	Rank	Time	Rank	Time	Rank
Mariama Jamanka	Monobob	1:05.85	15	1:06.94	17	1:05.47	5	1:05.74	7	4:24.00	13
Laura Nolte	Monobob	1:04.74	2	1:05.56	6	1:05.70	6	1:05.31	4	4:21.33	4
Mariama Jamanka*; Alexandra Burghardt	Two-woman	1:01.10	2	1:01.45	2	1:00.98	2	1:01.20	1	4:04.73	2nd place, silver medalist(s)
Kim Kalicki*; Lisa Buckwitz	Two-woman	1:01.61	6	1:01.78	5	1:01.30	4	1:01.59	5	4:06.28	4
Laura Nolte*; Deborah Levi	Two-woman	1:01.04	1	1:01.01	1	1:00.70	1	1:01.21	2	4:03.96	1st place, gold medalist(s)

== Cross-country skiing ==
By meeting the basic qualification standards, Germany has qualified at least one male and one female cross-country skier.

DOSB announced the 6 men and 8 women participating on 23 January 2017.

Distance
Men

Athlete	Event	Classical		Freestyle		Final		
Athlete	Event	Time	Rank	Time	Rank	Time	Deficit	Rank
Janosch Brugger	15 km classical	—N/a				40:24.5	+2:29.7	20
Lucas Bögl	15 km classical	—N/a				40:13.9	+2:19.1	17
Jonas Dobler	15 km classical	—N/a				40:21.0	+2:26.2	19
Albert Kuchler	15 km classical	—N/a				41:07.1	+3:12.3	32
Lucas Bögl	30 km skiathlon	41:37.9	14	38:34.6	8	1:20:12.5	+4:02.7	12
Jonas Dobler	30 km skiathlon	DNS						
Friedrich Moch	30 km skiathlon	41:17.9	12	38:58.5	19	1:20:16.4	+4:06.6	13
Florian Notz	30 km skiathlon	41:55.0	20	39:05.4	21	1:21:00.4	+4:50.6	19
Lucas Bögl	50 km freestyle	—N/a				1:16:11.5	+4:38.8	33
Jonas Dobler	50 km freestyle	—N/a				1:14:50.0	+3:17.3	20
Friedrich Moch	50 km freestyle	—N/a				1:16:03.6	+4:30.9	31
Florian Notz	50 km freestyle	—N/a				1:15:32.2	+3:59.5	26
Janosch Brugger; Friedrich Moch; Florian Notz; Lucas Bögl	4 × 10 km relay	1:00:56.7	6	56:49.8	5	1:57:46.5	+2:55.8	5

Women

Athlete	Event	Classical		Freestyle		Final		
Athlete	Event	Time	Rank	Time	Rank	Time	Deficit	Rank
Antonia Fräbel	10 km classical	—N/a				30:51.4	+2:45.1	28
Laura Gimmler	10 km classical	—N/a				31:05.6	+2:59.3	32
Katharina Hennig	10 km classical	—N/a				28:49.7	+43.4	5
Katherine Sauerbrey	10 km classical	—N/a				29:27.2	+1:20.9	11
Pia Fink	15 km skiathlon	25:02.3	25	23:27.3	27	48:29.6	+4:15.9	25
Katharina Hennig	15 km skiathlon	23:56.4	9	23:15.4	23	47:11.8	+2:58.1	15
Sofie Krehl	15 km skiathlon	24:56.4	22	22:45.2	14	47:41.6	+3:27.9	17
Katherine Sauerbrey	15 km skiathlon	24:05.0	11	22:32.5	15	46:37.5	+2:23.8	13
Victoria Carl	30 km freestyle	—N/a				1:30:08.4	+5:14.4	12
Pia Fink	30 km freestyle	—N/a				1:32:06.3	+7:12.3	25
Antonia Fräbel	30 km freestyle	—N/a				1:31:23.6	+6:29.6	19
Katherine Sauerbrey; Katharina Hennig; Victoria Carl; Sofie Krehl	4 × 5 km relay	—N/a				53:59.2	+18.2	2nd place, silver medalist(s)

Sprint

Athlete	Event	Qualification		Quarterfinal		Semifinal		Final	
Athlete	Event	Time	Rank	Time	Rank	Time	Rank	Time	Rank
Janosch Brugger	Men's sprint	2:56.01	38	Did not advance					
Albert Kuchler; Janosch Brugger	Men's team sprint	—N/a				21:20.39	12	Did not advance	23
Victoria Carl	Women's sprint	3:19.89	10 Q	3:18.26	3 LL	3:16.83	5	Did not advance	10
Pia Fink	Women's sprint	3:22.09	21 Q	3:19.72	3	Did not advance			15
Sofie Krehl	Women's sprint	3:18.93	8 Q	3:18.37	2 Q	3:21.32	6	Did not advance	11
Coletta Rydzek	Women's sprint	3:25.09	37	Did not advance					
Katharina Hennig; Victoria Carl	Women's team sprint	—N/a				23:02.08	1 Q	22:09.85	1st place, gold medalist(s)

== Figure skating ==
Germany qualified one ladies', one pairs, and one ice dance entry, based on its placement at the 2021 World Figure Skating Championships in Stockholm, Sweden.

Athlete	Event	SP / SD		FS / FD		Total	
Athlete	Event	Points	Rank	Points	Rank	Points	Rank
Nicole Schott	Women's singles	63.13	14 Q	114.52	19	177.65	17
Minerva Fabienne Hase / Nolan Seegert	Pairs	62.37	14 Q	87.32	16	149.69	16
Katharina Müller / Tim Dieck	Ice dance	65.47	21	Did not advance			

Team trophy

Athlete	Event	Short program/Short dance						Free skate/Free dance					
Athlete	Event	Men's	Women's	Pairs	Ice dance	Total		Men's	Women's	Pairs	Ice dance	Total	
Athlete	Event	Points Team points	Points Team points	Points Team points	Points Team points	Points	Rank	Points Team points	Points Team points	Points Team points	Points Team points	Points	Rank
Paul Fentz (M); Nicole Schott (L); Minerva Fabienne Hase / Nolan Seegert (P); Katharina Müller / Tim Dieck (ID)	Team event	68.64; 2	62.66; 5	WD; 0	63.21; 1	8	9	Did not advance					

== Freestyle skiing ==
DOSB announced the 4 men and 5 women competing on 19 January 2022.

Aerials
Women

Athlete	Event	Qualification				Final			
Athlete	Event	Jump 1		Jump 2		Jump 1		Jump 2	
Athlete	Event	Points	Rank	Points	Rank	Points	Rank	Points	Rank
Emma Weiß	Aerials	65.52	22	75.98	14	Did not advance			20

Freeski
Women

Athlete	Event	Qualification					Final				
Athlete	Event	Run 1	Run 2	Run 3	Best	Rank	Run 1	Run 2	Run 3	Best	Rank
Sabrina Cakmakli	Halfpipe	71.50	36.50	—N/a	71.50	12 Q	40.00	54.00	42.75	54.00	12
Alia Delia Eichinger	Big air	51.00	64.75	~~39.00~~	115.75	18	Did not advance				
Alia Delia Eichinger	Slopestyle	26.45	50.68	—N/a	50.68	17	Did not advance				

Ski cross

Athlete	Event	Seeding		1/8 final	Quarterfinal	Semifinal	Final	
Athlete	Event	Time	Rank	Position	Position	Position	Position	Rank
Niklas Bachsleitner	Men's ski cross	1:17.53	32	4	Did not advance			32
Daniel Bohnacker	Men's ski cross	1:13.21	17	2 Q	4	Did not advance		14
Tobias Müller	Men's ski cross	1:13.64	26	3	Did not advance			23
Florian Wilmsmann	Men's ski cross	1:13.22	18	3	Did not advance			21
Johanna Holzmann	Women's ski cross	1:20.95	20	2 Q	4	Did not advance		15
Daniela Maier	Women's ski cross	1:17.63	3	1 Q	2 Q	1 FA	4	(bronze) ^{[note]}

- ^{note}
Fanny Smith of Switzerland, the 2018 bronze medalist, initially crossed the line in third place and thought she had won the bronze medal. Daniela Maier of Germany finished fourth. However, following a 10-minute review by race judges, Smith was penalised for a clash with Maier, so at the awards ceremony on 17 February 2022 Maier was awarded the bronze.

On 26 February 2022, after the end of the Olympic Games, following an appeal from Fanny Smith, the FIS Appeals Commission made the decision to overturn the FIS Jury decision. As a result of winning the appeal, Smith was promoted to third place, while Maier officially finished in fourth place, which was reflected on the FIS website.

FIS has no right to make a decision on the return and redistribution of medals, as this issue is in the exclusive competence of the IOC, therefore, in its decision, the FIS Appeals Commission did not mention any words about the medals and their redistribution, and the IOC has the last word in this issue. On 13 December 2022, the Court of Arbitration for Sport decided both competitors will be awarded duplicate bronze medals and share joint third place. At the moment, the IOC has not yet updated the data on its website.

== Ice hockey ==
Summary

Key:

- OT – Overtime
- GWS – Match decided by penalty-shootout

Team	Event	Group stage					Qualification playoff	Quarterfinal	Semifinal	Final / BM	
Team	Event	Opposition Score	Opposition Score	Opposition Score	Opposition Score	Rank	Opposition Score	Opposition Score	Opposition Score	Opposition Score	Rank
Germany men's	Men's tournament	Canada; L 1–5	China; W 3–2	United States; L 2–3	—N/a	3	Slovakia; L 0–4	Did not advance			10

Germany has qualified 25 male competitors to the ice hockey tournament.

=== Men's tournament ===
Germany men's national ice hockey team qualified by being ranked 7th in the 2019 IIHF World Rankings.

Team roster

The roster was announced on 25 January 2022.

Head coach: (Finland) Toni Söderholm

No.	Pos.	Name	Height	Weight	Birthdate	Team
3	D	Dominik Bittner	1.81 m (5 ft 11 in)	76 kg (168 lb)	10 June 1992 (aged 29)	(Germany) Grizzlys Wolfsburg
5	D	Korbinian Holzer (A)	1.90 m (6 ft 3 in)	94 kg (207 lb)	16 February 1988 (aged 33)	(Germany) Adler Mannheim
8	F	Tobias Rieder	1.80 m (5 ft 11 in)	82 kg (181 lb)	10 January 1993 (aged 29)	(Sweden) Växjö Lakers
11	D	Marco Nowak	1.89 m (6 ft 2 in)	93 kg (205 lb)	23 July 1990 (aged 31)	(Germany) Düsseldorfer EG
15	F	Stefan Loibl	1.86 m (6 ft 1 in)	83 kg (183 lb)	24 June 1996 (aged 25)	(Sweden) Skellefteå AIK
16	D	Konrad Abeltshauser	1.95 m (6 ft 5 in)	102 kg (225 lb)	2 September 1992 (aged 29)	(Germany) EHC Red Bull München
21	F	Nico Krämmer	1.86 m (6 ft 1 in)	94 kg (207 lb)	23 October 1992 (aged 29)	(Germany) Adler Mannheim
22	F	Matthias Plachta	1.88 m (6 ft 2 in)	100 kg (220 lb)	16 May 1991 (aged 30)	(Germany) Adler Mannheim
33	G	Danny aus den Birken	1.86 m (6 ft 1 in)	87 kg (192 lb)	15 February 1985 (aged 36)	(Germany) EHC Red Bull München
34	F	Tom Kühnhackl	1.87 m (6 ft 2 in)	89 kg (196 lb)	21 January 1992 (aged 30)	(Sweden) Skellefteå AIK
35	G	Mathias Niederberger	1.80 m (5 ft 11 in)	80 kg (180 lb)	26 November 1992 (aged 29)	(Germany) Eisbären Berlin
38	D	Fabio Wagner	1.82 m (6 ft 0 in)	83 kg (183 lb)	17 September 1995 (aged 26)	(Germany) ERC Ingolstadt
41	D	Jonas Müller	1.83 m (6 ft 0 in)	88 kg (194 lb)	19 November 1995 (aged 26)	(Germany) Eisbären Berlin
42	F	Yasin Ehliz	1.80 m (5 ft 11 in)	84 kg (185 lb)	30 December 1992 (aged 29)	(Germany) EHC Red Bull München
50	F	Patrick Hager (A)	1.78 m (5 ft 10 in)	80 kg (180 lb)	8 September 1988 (aged 33)	(Germany) EHC Red Bull München
54	F	Lean Bergmann	1.87 m (6 ft 2 in)	93 kg (205 lb)	4 October 1998 (aged 23)	(Germany) Adler Mannheim
72	F	Dominik Kahun	1.80 m (5 ft 11 in)	82 kg (181 lb)	2 July 1995 (aged 26)	(Switzerland) SC Bern
83	F	Leonhard Pföderl	1.82 m (6 ft 0 in)	87 kg (192 lb)	1 September 1993 (aged 28)	(Germany) Eisbären Berlin
85	D	Marcel Brandt	1.76 m (5 ft 9 in)	80 kg (180 lb)	8 May 1992 (aged 29)	(Germany) Straubing Tigers
86	F	Daniel Pietta	1.85 m (6 ft 1 in)	93 kg (205 lb)	9 December 1986 (aged 35)	(Germany) ERC Ingolstadt
89	F	David Wolf	1.89 m (6 ft 2 in)	98 kg (216 lb)	15 September 1989 (aged 32)	(Germany) Adler Mannheim
90	G	Felix Brückmann	1.81 m (5 ft 11 in)	83 kg (183 lb)	16 December 1990 (aged 31)	(Germany) Adler Mannheim
91	D	Moritz Müller (C)	1.87 m (6 ft 2 in)	92 kg (203 lb)	19 November 1986 (aged 35)	(Germany) Kölner Haie
92	F	Marcel Noebels	1.92 m (6 ft 4 in)	92 kg (203 lb)	14 March 1992 (aged 29)	(Germany) Eisbären Berlin
95	F	Frederik Tiffels	1.85 m (6 ft 1 in)	91 kg (201 lb)	20 May 1995 (aged 26)	(Germany) EHC Red Bull München

Group play

Pos	Team	Pld	W	OTW	OTL	L	GF	GA	GD	Pts	Qualification
1	United States	3	3	0	0	0	15	4	+11	9	Quarterfinals
2	Canada	3	2	0	0	1	12	5	+7	6	Playoffs
3	Germany	3	1	0	0	2	6	10	−4	3	Playoffs
4	China (H)	3	0	0	0	3	2	16	−14	0	Playoffs

Source: IIHF
Rules for classification: Preliminary round tiebreakers
(H) Host

February 10, 2022; 21:10 v	Canada	5–1 (3–0, 1–1, 1–0)	Germany	Wukesong Arena, Beijing; Attendance: 685

Game reference

Edward Pasquale
Goalies
Mathias Niederberger
Referees:
(Sweden) Tobias Björk
(United States) Andrew Bruggeman
Linesmen:
(Czech Republic) Daniel Hynek
(Russia) Gleb Lazarev

Grant (Johnson, Street) – 04:43	1–0
Street (O'Dell, Johnson) – 09:47	2–0
Winnik (Cracknell, Desharnais) – 10:19	3–0
	3–1	30:45 – Rieder (Pföderl)
Noreau (O'Dell, Staal) (PP) – 32:58	4–1
Weal (Tambellini, Knight) – 51:22	5–1

8 min
Penalties
4 min
27
Shots
24

February 12, 2022; 16:40 v	Germany	3–2 (2–0, 1–1, 0–1)	China	Beijing National Indoor Stadium, Beijing; Attendance: 804

Game reference

Mathias Niederberger
Goalies
Shimisi Jieruimi
Referees:
(United States) Stephen Reneau
(Belarus) Maxim Sidorenko
Linesmen:
(United States) Brian Oliver
(Czech Republic) Jiří Ondráček

Brandt – 13:33	1–0
Holzer (Kahun) – 16:24	2–0
Kahun (Müller, Rieder) – 24:41	3–0
	3–1	39:14 – Fu S. (Jieke, Ruian)
	3–2	49:00 – Wang (Ye, Ruian) (PP)

12 min
Penalties
6 min
38
Shots
16

February 13, 2022; 21:10 v	United States	3–2 (1–1, 1–0, 1–1)	Germany	Wukesong Arena, Beijing; Attendance: 708

Game reference

Drew Commesso
Goalies
Danny aus den Birken
Referees:
(Russia) Evgenii Romasko
(Belarus) Maxim Sidorenko
Linesmen:
(Switzerland) David Obwegeser
(Czech Republic) Jiří Ondráček

	0–1	02:00 – Hager (Plachta, Kahun) (PP)
Kampfer (Miele, O'Neill) (PP) – 04:26	1–1
Knies (Abruzzese, Ness) – 24:50	2–1
Smith – 42:47	3–1
	3–2	57:31 – Kühnhackl (Bergmann, Müller)

12 min
Penalties
10 min
32
Shots
26

Playoffs

February 15, 2022; 12:10 v	Slovakia	4–0 (1–0, 2–0, 1–0)	Germany	Beijing National Indoor Stadium, Beijing; Attendance: 926

Game reference

Patrik Rybár
Goalies
Mathias Niederberger
Referees:
(Sweden) Tobias Björk
(Sweden) Mikael Nord
Linesmen:
(Russia) Gleb Lazarev
(Finland) Lauri Nikulainen

Hudáček (Pospíšil, Gernát) – 11:05	1–0
Cehlárik (Gernát, Hrivík) – 27:01	2–0
Krištof (Kňažko, Čerešňák) – 28:45	3–0
Hrivík (Cehlárik, Takáč) (ENG) – 57:56	4–0

8 min
Penalties
33 min
34
Shots
21

== Luge ==
Based on their rankings in the 2021–22 Luge World Cup, Germany qualified ten athletes and a relay team. The team consists of three athletes each in the individual events and two doubles sleds. The team was officially named on 11 January 2022.

Men

Athlete	Event	Run 1		Run 2		Run 3		Run 4		Total	
Athlete	Event	Time	Rank	Time	Rank	Time	Rank	Time	Rank	Time	Rank
Max Langenhan	Singles	57.606	9	57.536	5	57.521	8	57.429	4	3:50.092	6
Felix Loch	Singles	57.383	5	57.500	4	57.510	7	57.485	6	3:49.878	4
Johannes Ludwig	Singles	57.063	1	57.438	2	57.043	1	57.191	1	3:48.735	1st place, gold medalist(s)
Tobias Arlt; Tobias Wendl	Doubles	58.255	1	58.299	1	—N/a				1:56.554	1st place, gold medalist(s)
Sascha Benecken; Toni Eggert	Doubles	58.300	2	58.353	2	—N/a				1:56.653	2nd place, silver medalist(s)

Women

Athlete	Event	Run 1		Run 2		Run 3		Run 4		Total	
Athlete	Event	Time	Rank	Time	Rank	Time	Rank	Time	Rank	Time	Rank
Anna Berreiter	Singles	58.525	4	58.508	3	58.348	2	58.566	4	3:53.947	2nd place, silver medalist(s)
Natalie Geisenberger	Singles	58.402	2	58.423	1	58.226	1	58.403	2	3:53.454	1st place, gold medalist(s)
Julia Taubitz	Singles	58.345	1	1:00.075	26	58.655	7	58.358	1	3:55.433	7

Mixed team relay

Athlete	Event	Run 1		Run 2		Run 3		Total	
Athlete	Event	Time	Rank	Time	Rank	Time	Rank	Time	Rank
Tobias Arlt; Natalie Geisenberger; Johannes Ludwig; Tobias Wendl	Team relay	1:00.090	2	1:01.407	2	1:01.909	1	3:03.406	1st place, gold medalist(s)

== Nordic combined ==
DOSB announced the five athletes participating on 19 January 2018. Manuel Faißt was nominated after Frenzel and Weber were tested positive for COVID-19.

Athlete	Event	Ski jumping			Cross-country		Total	
Athlete	Event	Distance	Points	Rank	Time	Rank	Time	Rank
Vinzenz Geiger	Individual normal hill/10 km	98.0	111.4	11	23:41.7	1	25:07.7	1st place, gold medalist(s)
Vinzenz Geiger	Individual large hill/10 km	122.0	106.0	14	25:29.5	3	27:44.5	7
Manuel Faißt	Individual large hill/10 km	133.0	128.0	4	26:29.6	15	27:16.6	4
Johannes Rydzek	Individual normal hill/10 km	104.0	122.2	4	24:46.5	9	25:29.5	5
Johannes Rydzek	Individual large hill/10 km	123.5	105.2	15	28:04.0	39	30:22.0	28
Julian Schmid	Individual normal hill/10 km	103.5	123.4	2	25:17.9	21	25:57.9	8
Julian Schmid	Individual large hill/10 km	133.5	116.0	9	26:39.1	17	28:14.1	10
Terence Weber	Individual normal hill/10 km	DNS						
Manuel Faißt; Eric Frenzel; Vinzenz Geiger; Julian Schmid	Team large hill/4 × 5 km	525.0	467.0	4	51:29.0	5	51:40.0	2nd place, silver medalist(s)

== Short track speed skating ==
Germany has qualified two female short track speed skaters.

On 19 January 2022, DOSB announced that they will only use one female quota and nominated Anna Seidel.

Athlete	Event	Heat		Quarterfinal		Semifinal		Final	
Athlete	Event	Time	Rank	Time	Rank	Time	Rank	Time	Rank
Anna Seidel	Women's 1500 m	PEN		—N/a		Did not advance			

== Skeleton ==
Based on the world rankings, Germany qualified 6 sleds.

On 19 January 2022, DOSB announced the 6 competing athletes.

Athlete	Event	Run 1		Run 2		Run 3		Run 4		Total	
Athlete	Event	Time	Rank	Time	Rank	Time	Rank	Time	Rank	Time	Rank
Alexander Gassner	Men's	1:00.87	9	1:00.86	9	1:00.62	8	1:00.48	5	4:02.83	8
Christopher Grotheer	Men's	1:00.00	1	1:00.33	1	1:00.16	1	1:00.52	6	4:01.01	1st place, gold medalist(s)
Axel Jungk	Men's	1:00.50	5	1:00.53	2	1:00.31	2	1:00.33	3	4:01.67	2nd place, silver medalist(s)
Tina Hermann	Women's	1:02.28	5	1:02.29	3	1:01.90	5	1:02.26	6	4:08.73	4
Jacqueline Lölling	Women's	1:02.27	4	1:02.45	7	1:02.22	7	1:02.41	14	4:09.35	8
Hannah Neise	Women's	1:02.36	8	1:02.19	1	1:01.44	1	1:01.63	1	4:07.62	1st place, gold medalist(s)

== Ski jumping ==
DOSB announced 3 men and 4 women participating on 19 January 2022. Two more men will be announced after 22 January 2022.

Men

Athlete	Event	Qualification			First round			Final			Total	
Athlete	Event	Distance	Points	Rank	Distance	Points	Rank	Distance	Points	Rank	Points	Rank
Markus Eisenbichler	Normal hill	91.0	90.8	23 Q	92.0	110.4	31	Did not advance				
Karl Geiger	Normal hill	97.5	103.9	9 Q	96.0	127.5	21 Q	99.0	125.3	11	252.8	15
Stephan Leyhe	Normal hill	95.5	101.6	11 Q	97.5	129.3	13 Q	95.0	115.1	25	244.4	24
Constantin Schmid	Normal hill	86.5	76.0	39 Q	102.0	134.4	6 Q	98.0	122.9	18	257.3	11
Markus Eisenbichler	Large hill	129.0	123.3	6 Q	137.5	135.2	8 Q	139.5	140.5	4	275.7	5
Karl Geiger	Large hill	128.0	120.0	12 Q	138.0	136.7	6 Q	138.0	144.6	3	281.3	3rd place, bronze medalist(s)
Pius Paschke	Large hill	119.0	102.9	30 Q	131.0	126.7	23 Q	127.0	116.8	29	243.5	28
Constantin Schmid	Large hill	127.0	114.9	19 Q	134.0	131.4	11 Q	134.0	132.5	14	263.9	14
Constantin Schmid; Stephan Leyhe; Markus Eisenbichler; Karl Geiger	Team large hill	—N/a			511.0	446.5	4	518.5	476.4	2	922.9	3rd place, bronze medalist(s)

Women

Athlete	Event	First round			Final			Total	
Athlete	Event	Distance	Points	Rank	Distance	Points	Rank	Points	Rank
Katharina Althaus	Normal hill	105.5	121.1	1 Q	94.0	115.7	3	236.8	2nd place, silver medalist(s)
Selina Freitag	Normal hill	80.0	69.8	28 Q	90.0	93.2	11	163.0	22
Pauline Heßler	Normal hill	89.5	80.9	21 Q	83.0	80.7	23	161.6	24
Juliane Seyfarth	Normal hill	86.0	78.7	23 Q	88.0	89.9	14	168.6	19

Mixed

Athlete	Event	First round			Final			Total	
Athlete	Event	Distance	Points	Rank	Distance	Points	Rank	Points	Rank
Selina Freitag; Constantin Schmid; Katharina Althaus; Karl Geiger	Mixed team	290.5	350.9	9	Did not advance				

== Snowboarding ==
DOSB announced the 9 men and 6 women participating on 19 January 2022.

Freestyle

Athlete	Event	Qualification					Final				
Athlete	Event	Run 1	Run 2	Run 3	Best	Rank	Run 1	Run 2	Run 3	Best	Rank
Noah Vicktor	Men's big air	60.50	~~18.25~~	29.75	90.25	24	Did not advance				
Leon Vockensperger	Men's big air	66.00	24.00	~~17.25~~	90.00	25	Did not advance				
André Höflich	Men's halfpipe	75.0	17.75	—N/a	75.00	10 Q	13.25	76.00	50.00	76.00	8
Noah Vicktor	Men's slopestyle	16.66	62.56	—N/a	62.56	16	Did not advance				
Leon Vockensperger	Men's slopestyle	25.15	26.41	—N/a	26.41	29	Did not advance				
Annika Morgan	Women's big air	~~12.00~~	64.25	68.00	132.25	8 Q	~~15.50~~	73.50	14.50	88.00	10
Leilani Ettel	Women's halfpipe	68.75	15.75	—N/a	68.75	11 Q	55.25	57.50	9.25	57.50	11
Annika Morgan	Women's slopestyle	29.61	67.63	—N/a	67.63	10 Q	64.13	31.01	28.76	64.13	8

Parallel

Athlete	Event	Qualification		Round of 16	Quarterfinal	Semifinal	Final	
Athlete	Event	Time	Rank	Opposition Time	Opposition Time	Opposition Time	Opposition Time	Rank
Yannik Angenend	Men's giant slalom	1:22.28	13 Q	Mastnak (SLO); L +0.26	Did not advance			13
Stefan Baumeister	Men's giant slalom	1:22.64	18	Did not advance				
Elias Huber	Men's giant slalom	1:31.16	29	Did not advance				
Melanie Hochreiter	Women's giant slalom	1:42.74	27	Did not advance				
Ramona Hofmeister	Women's giant slalom	1:26.20	2 Q	Takeuchi (JPN); W DNF	Ulbing (AUT); L −0.14	Did not advance		5
Carolin Langenhorst	Women's giant slalom	1:27.60	6 Q	Zogg (SUI); W −0.08	Kotnik (SLO); L –0.15	Did not advance		7

Snowboard cross

Athlete	Event	Seeding		1/8 final	Quarterfinal	Semifinal	Final	
Athlete	Event	Time	Rank	Position	Position	Position	Position	Rank
Paul Berg	Men's	1:18.31	12	3	Did not advance			18
Umito Kirchwehm	Men's	1:18.22	11	2 Q	DNF	Did not advance		14
Martin Nörl	Men's	1:17.38	5	1 Q	DNF	Did not advance		9
Jana Fischer	Women's	1:24.88	20	4	Did not advance			27
Martin Nörl; Jana Fischer	Mixed team	—N/a			2 Q	3 FB	1	5

== Speed skating ==
DOSB announced the 3 men and 2 women participating on 11 January 2022.

Athlete	Event	Race	
Athlete	Event	Time	Rank
Joel Dufter	Men's 500 m	35.37	26
Joel Dufter	Men's 1000 m	1:10.16	26
Patrick Beckert	Men's 5000 m	6:19.58	11
Felix Rijhnen	Men's 5000 m	6:19.86	13
Patrick Beckert	Men's 10000 m	13:01.23	7
Michelle Uhrig	Women's 1500 m	2:00.20	25
Claudia Pechstein	Women's 3000 m	4:17.16	20

Mass start

Athlete	Event	Semifinal			Final		
Athlete	Event	Points	Time	Rank	Points	Time	Rank
Felix Rijhnen	Men's	DQ			Did not advance		
Claudia Pechstein	Women's	3	8:30.99	7 Q	3	8:25.78	9
Michelle Uhrig	Women's	2	9:02.52	11	Did not advance		20

== See also ==
- Germany at the 2022 Winter Paralympics
