= Alpine skiing at the 2022 Winter Olympics – Mixed team =

Mixed team at the XXIV Olympic Winter Games
- Alpine skiing
- Venue: Xiaohaituo Alpine Skiing Field, Yanqing District
- Date: 20 February
- Competitors: 78 from 15 nations

Medalists
1st place, gold medalist(s)		Katharina Huber; Katharina Liensberger; Katharina Truppe; Stefan Brennsteiner; Michael Matt; Johannes Strolz	Austria
2nd place, silver medalist(s)		Emma Aicher; Lena Dürr; Julian Rauchfuß; Alexander Schmid; Linus Straßer	Germany
3rd place, bronze medalist(s)		Mina Fürst Holtmann; Thea Louise Stjernesund; Maria Therese Tviberg; Timon Haugan; Fabian Wilkens Solheim; Rasmus Windingstad	Norway

The alpine skiing mixed team event competition of the Beijing 2022 Olympics was held on 20 February, on "Rainbow" course at the Xiaohaituo Alpine Skiing Field in Yanqing District. Austria won the event, with Germany second and Norway third.

Switzerland were the defending champion, with Austria and Norway the defending silver and bronze medalists, respectively. Norway were the 2021 world champion, ahead of Sweden and Germany.

The event was scheduled for Saturday, February 19, but was moved to Sunday, February 20 due to strong winds.

== Qualification ==
Teams and participating athletes:

- Austria
  - Katharina Huber
  - Katharina Liensberger
  - Katharina Truppe
  - Stefan Brennsteiner
  - Michael Matt
  - Johannes Strolz
- Canada
  - Cassidy Gray
  - Erin Mielzynski
  - Trevor Philp
  - Erik Read
- China
  - Kong Fanying
  - Ni Yueming
  - Xu Mingfu
  - Zhang Yangming
- Czech Republic
  - Tereza Nová
  - Elese Sommerová
  - Kryštof Krýzl
  - Jan Zabystřan
- France
  - Clara Direz
  - Coralie Frasse Sombet
  - Tessa Worley
  - Mathieu Faivre
  - Thibaut Favrot
  - Alexis Pinturault
- Germany
  - Emma Aicher
  - Lena Dürr
  - Julian Rauchfuß
  - Alexander Schmid
  - Linus Straßer
- Italy
  - Marta Bassino
  - Federica Brignone
  - Nicol Delago
  - Luca De Aliprandini
  - Tommaso Sala
  - Alex Vinatzer
- Norway
  - Mina Fürst Holtmann
  - Thea Louise Stjernesund
  - Maria Therese Tviberg
  - Timon Haugan
  - Fabian Wilkens Solheim
  - Rasmus Windingstad
- Poland
  - Zuzanna Czapska
  - Maryna Gąsienica-Daniel
  - Magdalena Łuczak
  - Michał Jasiczek
  - Paweł Pyjas
- ROC
  - Anastasia Gornostaeva
  - Julia Pleshkova
  - Ekaterina Tkachenko
  - Aleksandr Andrienko
  - Ivan Kuznetsov
- Slovakia
  - Petra Hromcová
  - Rebeka Jančová
  - Adam Žampa
  - Andreas Žampa
- Slovenia
  - Tina Robnik
  - Andreja Slokar
  - Miha Hrobat
  - Žan Kranjec
- Sweden
  - Hanna Aronsson Elfman
  - Hilma Lövblom
  - Kristoffer Jakobsen
  - Mattias Rönngren
- Switzerland
  - Andrea Ellenberger
  - Wendy Holdener
  - Camille Rast
  - Gino Caviezel
  - Justin Murisier
- United States
  - AJ Hurt
  - Paula Moltzan
  - Mikaela Shiffrin
  - Tommy Ford
  - River Radamus
  - Luke Winters

== FIS Overall Nations Cup standings ==
The participating nations were seeded according to the Overall Nations Cup standings prior to the 2022 Winter Olympics.

Rank	Country	Points
1	Austria	7686
2	Switzerland	6952
3	Italy	4896
4	Norway	3555
5	France	2756
6	United States	2666
7	Germany	1889
8	Slovenia	1383
9	Canada	1277
10	Sweden	1229
11	Slovakia	1031
12	~~Croatia~~	443
13	Czech Republic	312
14	Great Britain	288
15	Poland	189
16	New Zealand	177
17	ROC	149
18	Bulgaria	97
19	Belgium	82
20	Japan	52
21	Spain	32
22	Finland	28
23	Bosnia and Herzegovina	17
24	Belarus	11
25	Netherlands	6
26	China	0

- As Croatia declined a spot in the team event, their allocation passed to the next eligible NOC, which was ROC.

== Results ==
The race was started at 09:00.

=== Bracket ===
Round of 16
Slovenia	2*
Canada	2
France	3
Czech Republic	1
Norway	2*
Poland	2
Italy	3
ROC	1
United States	3
Slovakia	1
Germany	3
Sweden	1
Switzerland	4
China	0

Quarterfinals
Austria	3
Slovenia	1
France	2
Norway	2*
Italy	1
United States	3
Germany	2*
Switzerland	2

Semifinals
Austria	2*
Norway	2
United States	1
Germany	3

Final
Austria	2*
Germany	2
Third place
Norway	2*
United States	2

Notes

- Teams marked with asterisks won by faster accumulated time of the best male and the best female skier.
