= Biathlon at the 2022 Winter Olympics – Men's mass start =

Men’s mass start at the XXIV Olympic Winter Games
- Biathlon
- Venue: Hualindong Ski Resort
- Date: 18 February 2022
- Competitors: 30 from 13 nations
- Winning time: 38:14.4

Medalists
1st place, gold medalist(s)		Johannes Thingnes Bø	Norway
2nd place, silver medalist(s)		Martin Ponsiluoma	Sweden
3rd place, bronze medalist(s)		Vetle Sjåstad Christiansen	Norway

The Men's mass start competition of the Beijing 2022 Olympics was held on 18 February, at the National Biathlon Centre, in the Zhangjiakou cluster of competition venues, 180 kilometres (110 mi) north of Beijing, at an elevation of 1,665 metres (5,463 ft). Johannes Thingnes Bø of Norway won the event. Martin Ponsiluoma of Sweden won the silver medal, his first Olympic medal, and Vetle Sjåstad Christiansen of Norway won bronze, his first individual Olympic medal.

== Summary ==
All three 2018 medalists, the champion Martin Fourcade, Simon Schempp, and Emil Hegle Svendsen, retired from competitions. The overall leader of the 2021–22 Biathlon World Cup before the Olympics was Quentin Fillon Maillet, and the leader in the mass start was Benedikt Doll, with Fillon Maillet second.

After the third shooting, Johannes Thingnes Bø was leading, despite two penalty loops. Ponsiluoma and Fillon Maillet were 20-25 seconds behind. The next pursuers, Christian Gow and Sebastian Samuelsson, were a minute behind Bø. At the last shooting, Bø had to ski two penalty loops, Fillon Maillet three, and Ponsiluoma one. Bø still emerged as a leader, with Ponsiluoma 18 seconds behind. Vetle Sjåstad Christiansen was third, 45 seconds behind Bø, and Fillon Maillet was further 20 seconds behind Sjåstad Christiansen. They finished in the same order.

== Results ==
The race was started at 17:00.

Rank	Bib	Name	Country	Time	Penalties (P+P+S+S)	Deficit
1st place, gold medalist(s)	2	Johannes Thingnes Bø	Norway	38:14.4	4 (1+0+1+2)	—
2nd place, silver medalist(s)	18	Martin Ponsiluoma	Sweden	38:54.7	2 (1+0+0+1)	+40.3
3rd place, bronze medalist(s)	8	Vetle Sjåstad Christiansen	Norway	39:26.9	3 (2+0+1+0)	+1:12.5
4	1	Quentin Fillon Maillet	France	39:40.0	5 (1+1+0+3)	+1:25.6
5	23	Dominik Windisch	Italy	39:52.8	3 (0+2+1+0)	+1:38.4
6	9	Sturla Holm Lægreid	Norway	40:00.5	5 (1+2+1+1)	+1:46.1
7	26	Simon Eder	Austria	40:10.8	2 (2+0+0+0)	+1:56.4
8	12	Benedikt Doll	Germany	40:45.8	6 (0+0+2+4)	+2:31.4
9	14	Tero Seppälä	Finland	40:47.1	5 (1+0+2+2)	+2:32.7
10	15	Johannes Kühn	Germany	40:52.7	5 (1+0+2+2)	+2:38.3
11	7	Sebastian Samuelsson	Sweden	41:01.0	4 (0+0+1+3)	+2:46.6
12	4	Tarjei Bø	Norway	41:01.8	4 (0+1+2+1)	+2:47.4
13	25	Christian Gow	Canada	41:02.5	3 (0+0+0+3)	+2:48.1
14	17	Roman Rees	Germany	41:05.2	3 (0+0+1+2)	+2:50.8
15	10	Alexander Loginov	ROC	41:06.2	7 (2+0+2+3)	+2:51.8
16	11	Simon Desthieux	France	41:11.4	5 (1+2+1+1)	+2:57.0
17	3	Anton Smolski	Belarus	41:22.3	4 (1+1+0+2)	+3:07.9
18	29	Jules Burnotte	Canada	41:35.0	5 (2+1+1+1)	+3:20.6
19	5	Eduard Latypov	ROC	41:35.4	7 (1+3+1+2)	+3:21.0
20	16	Maxim Tsvetkov	ROC	41:37.7	6 (1+1+2+2)	+3:23.3
21	28	Michal Krčmář	Czech Republic	41:54.9	5 (0+1+1+3)	+3:40.5
22	6	Émilien Jacquelin	France	42:08.7	5 (2+1+0+2)	+3:54.3
23	27	Philipp Nawrath	Germany	42:10.1	7 (0+0+3+4)	+3:55.7
24	20	Dmytro Pidruchnyi	Ukraine	42:16.2	7 (0+3+2+2)	+4:01.8
25	21	Scott Gow	Canada	42:17.6	7 (0+4+2+1)	+4:03.2
26	13	Fabien Claude	France	42:49.8	5 (1+2+1+1)	+4:35.4
27	19	Lukas Hofer	Italy	42:58.8	6 (1+1+2+2)	+4:44.4
28	24	Artem Pryma	Ukraine	43:12.6	7 (2+1+3+1)	+4:58.2
29	22	Felix Leitner	Austria	43:37.9	7 (2+1+2+2)	+5:23.5
30	30	Cheng Fangming	China	44:26.8	4 (4+0+0+0)	+6:12.4
