= Biathlon at the 2022 Winter Olympics =

Biathlon at the XXIV Olympic Winter Games
- Biathlon pictogram
- Venue: Kuyangshu Nordic Center and Biathlon Center
- Dates: 5–18 February
- No. of events: 11 (5 men, 5 women, 1 mixed)
- Competitors: 212 from 30 nations

Biathlon at the 2022 Winter Olympics was held at the National Biathlon Centre, in the Zhangjiakou cluster of competition venues, 180 kilometres (110 mi) north of Beijing, at an elevation of 1,665 metres (5,463 ft), from 5 to 18 February 2022.

A total of 210 quota spots (105 per gender) were distributed to the sport, a decline of 20 from the 2018 Winter Olympics. A total of 11 events were contested, five for men, five for women and one mixed.

== Qualification ==
A total quota of 210 athletes are allowed at the Games (105 both men and women). The first 93 quota allocations, per gender, will be assigned using a combination of the Nation Cup scores of their top 3 athletes in their best six sprints, one individual, three relays, one mixed relay, and one single mixed relay. These results will come during the 2020–21 Biathlon World Cup and 2021–22 Biathlon World Cups seasons, up until 16 January 2022. The final 12 spots, per gender, will be allocated using the IBU Qualifying Points List, to nations who have not qualified any athletes yet, with a maximum of two per nation.

On 16 January 2022, NOCs ranked 1-3 will qualify six athletes, 4-10 five athletes, and 11-20 four athletes, for both male and female competitions. The final twelve spots in each gender are filled individually from the IBU Qualifying points list to a maximum of two for a nation, from nations not already qualified. Two of these spots will be used by the host if not already qualified. The host may only start in the relay competitions that they have enough qualified athletes for. Reallocation of unused quotas will be from the IBU Qualifying points list for nations that have not yet qualified, or only have one qualifier. For each event a maximum of 4 athletes per NOC may compete, except the Mass Start in which it remains possible to qualify up to 6.

== Competition schedule ==
The following is the competition schedule for all eleven events.

All times are in local time (UTC+8), according to the official schedule correct as of March 2021. This schedule may be subject to change in due time.

Date	Time	Event
5 February	17:00	Mixed 4 × 6 km relay
7 February	17:00	Women's 15 km individual
8 February	16:30	Men's 20 km individual
11 February	17:00	Women's 7.5 km sprint
12 February	17:00	Men's 10 km sprint
13 February	17:00	Women's 10 km pursuit
13 February	18:45	Men's 12.5 km pursuit
15 February	14:30	Men's 4 × 7.5 km relay
16 February	15:45	Women's 4 × 6 km relay
18 February	15:00	Women's 12.5 km mass start
18 February	17:00	Men's 15 km mass start

== Medal summary ==
=== Medal table ===
Rank	Nation	Gold	Silver	Bronze	Total
1	Norway	6	2	6	14
2	France	3	4	0	7
3	Sweden	1	3	0	4
4	Germany	1	0	1	2
5	ROC	0	1	3	4
6	Belarus	0	1	0	1
7	Italy	0	0	1	1
Totals (7 entries)		11	11	11	33

=== Men's events ===
Event	Gold		Silver		Bronze	
Individual	Quentin Fillon Maillet; France	48:47.4	Anton Smolski; Belarus	49:02.2	Johannes Thingnes Bø; Norway	49:18.5
Sprint	Johannes Thingnes Bø; Norway	24:00.4	Quentin Fillon Maillet; France	24:25.9	Tarjei Bø; Norway	24:39.3
Pursuit	Quentin Fillon Maillet; France	39:07.5	Tarjei Bø; Norway	39:36.1	Eduard Latypov; ROC	39:42.8
Mass start	Johannes Thingnes Bø; Norway	38:14.4	Martin Ponsiluoma; Sweden	38:54.7	Vetle Sjåstad Christiansen; Norway	39:26.9
Relay	Norway; Sturla Holm Lægreid; Tarjei Bø; Johannes Thingnes Bø; Vetle Sjåstad Christiansen	1:19:50.2	France; Fabien Claude; Émilien Jacquelin; Simon Desthieux; Quentin Fillon Maillet	1:20:17.6	ROC; Said Karimulla Khalili; Alexander Loginov; Maxim Tsvetkov; Eduard Latypov	1:20:35.5

=== Women's events ===
Event	Gold		Silver		Bronze	
Individual	Denise Herrmann; Germany	44:12.7	Anaïs Chevalier-Bouchet; France	44:22.1	Marte Olsbu Røiseland; Norway	44:28.0
Sprint	Marte Olsbu Røiseland; Norway	20:44.3	Elvira Öberg; Sweden	21:15.2	Dorothea Wierer; Italy	21:21.5
Pursuit	Marte Olsbu Røiseland; Norway	34:46.9	Elvira Öberg; Sweden	36:23.4	Tiril Eckhoff; Norway	36:35.6
Mass start	Justine Braisaz-Bouchet; France	40:18.0	Tiril Eckhoff; Norway	40:33.3	Marte Olsbu Røiseland; Norway	40:52.9
Relay	Sweden; Linn Persson; Mona Brorsson; Hanna Öberg; Elvira Öberg	1:11:03.9	ROC; Irina Kazakevich; Kristina Reztsova; Svetlana Mironova; Uliana Nigmatullina	1:11:15.9	Germany; Vanessa Voigt; Vanessa Hinz; Franziska Preuß; Denise Herrmann	1:11:41.3

=== Mixed event ===
Event	Gold		Silver		Bronze	
Relay	Norway; Marte Olsbu Røiseland; Tiril Eckhoff; Tarjei Bø; Johannes Thingnes Bø	1:06:45.6	France; Anaïs Chevalier-Bouchet; Julia Simon; Émilien Jacquelin; Quentin Fillon Maillet	1:06:46.5	ROC; Uliana Nigmatullina; Kristina Reztsova; Alexander Loginov; Eduard Latypov	1:06:47.1

== Participating nations ==
A total of 212 athletes from 30 nations (including the IOC's designation of ROC for the Russian Olympic Committee) qualified to participate.

The numbers in parentheses represents the number of participants entered.

- Austria (10)
- Belarus (10)
- Belgium (5)
- Bulgaria (8)
- Canada (8)
- China (8)
- Czech Republic (10)
- Denmark (1)
- Estonia (8)
- Finland (8)
- France (12)
- Germany (11)
- Italy (10)
- Japan (6)
- Kazakhstan (3)
- Latvia (1)
- Lithuania (5)
- Moldova (4)
- New Zealand (1)
- Norway (12)
- Poland (5)
- ROC (10)
- Romania (2)
- Slovakia (8)
- Slovenia (6)
- South Korea (3)
- Sweden (11)
- Switzerland (8)
- Ukraine (10)
- United States (8)
