= Nordic combined at the 2022 Winter Olympics – Individual normal hill/10 km =

Individual normal hill/10 km at the XXIV Olympic Winter Games
- Nordic combined
- Venue: Kuyangshu Nordic Center and Biathlon Center, Zhangjiakou
- Date: 9 February 2022
- Competitors: 45 from 17 nations
- Winning time: 25:07.7

Medalists
1st place, gold medalist(s)		Vinzenz Geiger	Germany
2nd place, silver medalist(s)		Jørgen Graabak	Norway
3rd place, bronze medalist(s)		Lukas Greiderer	Austria

The individual normal hill/10 km competition in Nordic combined at the 2022 Winter Olympics was held on 9 February, at the Kuyangshu Nordic Center and Biathlon Center in Zhangjiakou. Vinzenz Geiger of Germany won the event. For him, this was the first Olympic medal in an individual event. Jørgen Graabak of Norway, the 2014 individual large hill and team champion, was second. Lukas Greiderer of Austria won the bronze medal, his first Olympic medal.

The defending champion was Eric Frenzel, who won this event in 2014 and 2018. Frenzel qualified for the Olympics but did not participate in the event. The 2018 silver medalist, Akito Watabe, qualified as well. but the bronze medalist, Lukas Klapfer, did not. Johannes Lamparter was the overall leader of the 2021–22 FIS Nordic Combined World Cup before the Olympics, followed by Jarl Magnus Riiber and Geiger. Riiber was the 2021 World Champion in individual large hill/10 km. Riiber had to withdraw from the event due to a positive COVID-19 test.

Ryota Yamamoto won the jump. In the cross-country part, the three athletes with the next best results in the jump, Greiderer, Julian Schmid, and Johannes Rydzek, soon caught up with Yamamoto and skied together, followed by another group 25–30 seconds behind. At 6 km, Yamamoto has already dropped out of medal contention, and Greiderer, Schmid, and Rydzek were 30 seconds ahead of the second group, then the gap started to narrow. The group caught up with Greiderer, but at 8.5 km Schmid and Rydzek were still 15 seconds ahead. Finally, they were caught up as well, and at the finish line Geiger was first, Graabak second, and Greiderer third, with Lamparter fourth not so far behind.

== Results ==
=== Ski jumping ===
The ski jumping part was held at 16:00.

Rank	Bib	Name	Country	Distance (m)	Points	Time difference
1	39	Ryōta Yamamoto	Japan	108.0	133.0	–
2	34	Lukas Greiderer	Austria	103.5	123.4	+0:38
3	42	Julian Schmid	Germany	103.0	123.1	+0:40
4	38	Johannes Rydzek	Germany	104.0	122.2	+0:43
5	46	Johannes Lamparter	Austria	100.0	116.9	+1:04
5	29	Sora Yachi	Japan	103.5	116.9	+1:04
7	32	Franz-Josef Rehrl	Austria	102.0	115.8	+1:09
8	37	Ilkka Herola	Finland	100.0	115.7	+1:09
9	44	Jørgen Graabak	Norway	98.5	114.1	+1:16
9	40	Akito Watabe	Japan	98.0	114.1	+1:16
11	45	Vinzenz Geiger	Germany	98.0	111.4	+1:26
12	20	Mattéo Baud	France	97.5	111.3	+1:27
13	31	Yoshito Watabe	Japan	97.5	110.8	+1:29
13	27	Tomáš Portyk	Czech Republic	97.0	110.8	+1:29
15	34	Espen Bjørnstad	Norway	99.0	110.1	+1:32
16	36	Espen Andersen	Norway	96.0	109.3	+1:35
17	26	Ben Loomis	United States	94.5	105.6	+1:50
18	33	Martin Fritz	Austria	96.0	105.2	+1:51
19	28	Eero Hirvonen	Finland	93.0	104.1	+1:56
20	41	Jens Lurås Oftebro	Norway	92.5	103.8	+1:57
21	30	Laurent Mühlethaler	France	94.0	102.4	+2:02
22	24	Raffaele Buzzi	Italy	93.0	99.9	+2:12
22	12	Ondřej Pažout	Czech Republic	96.0	99.9	+2:12
24	19	Jared Shumate	United States	93.5	99.2	+2:15
25	18	Lukáš Daněk	Czech Republic	97.0	98.2	+2:19
26	2	Iacopo Bortolas	Italy	93.5	97.0	+2:24
27	23	Arttu Mäkiaho	Finland	95.5	95.1	+2:32
28	21	Perttu Reponen	Finland	90.0	94.2	+2:35
29	16	Jan Vytrval	Czech Republic	92.5	93.5	+2:38
30	14	Gaël Blondeau	France	91.0	91.3	+2:47
31	17	Vid Vrhovnik	Slovenia	91.5	88.0	+3:00
32	13	Szczepan Kupczak	Poland	89.5	87.5	+3:02
33	4	Stephen Schumann	United States	88.5	86.4	+3:06
34	22	Taylor Fletcher	United States	86.5	83.3	+3:19
35	11	Dmytro Mazurchuk	Ukraine	87.0	82.5	+3:22
36	8	Park Je-un	South Korea	90.0	82.3	+3:23
37	6	Andrzej Szczechowicz	Poland	82.5	76.4	+3:46
38	10	Chingiz Rakparov	Kazakhstan	79.5	69.9	+4:12
39	3	Artem Galunin	ROC	77.0	66.8	+4:25
40	15	Alessandro Pittin	Italy	75.5	62.9	+4:40
41	5	Viacheslav Barkov	ROC	78.0	61.6	+4:46
42	9	Zhao Jiawen	China	81.0	59.0	+4:56
43	7	Markuss Vinogradovs	Latvia	72.0	55.0	+5:12
44	1	Samir Mastiev	ROC	72.0	47.8	+5:41
	25	Antoine Gérard	France	Disqualified		
	43	Terence Weber	Germany	Did not start		

=== Cross-country ===
The cross-country part was held at 19:00.

Rank	Bib	Name	Country	Start time	Cross-country		Finish time	Deficit
Rank	Bib	Name	Country	Start time	Time	Rank	Finish time	Deficit
1st place, gold medalist(s)	11	Vinzenz Geiger	Germany	1:26	23:41.7	1	25:07.7	
2nd place, silver medalist(s)	9	Jørgen Graabak	Norway	1:16	23:52.5	2	25:08.5	+0.8
3rd place, bronze medalist(s)	2	Lukas Greiderer	Austria	0:38	24:36.3	7	25:14.3	+6.6
4	5	Johannes Lamparter	Austria	1:04	24:12.7	3	25:16.7	+9.0
5	4	Johannes Rydzek	Germany	0:43	24:46.5	9	25:29.5	+21.8
6	8	Ilkka Herola	Finland	1:09	24:24.1	4	25:33.1	+25.4
7	10	Akito Watabe	Japan	1:16	24:24.1	4	25:40.1	+32.4
8	3	Julian Schmid	Germany	0:40	25:17.9	21	25:57.9	+50.2
9	7	Franz-Josef Rehrl	Austria	1:09	25:08.3	17	26:17.3	+1:09.6
10	20	Jens Lurås Oftebro	Norway	1:57	24:53.2	11	26:50.2	+1:42.5
11	16	Espen Andersen	Norway	1:35	25:17.3	20	26:52.3	+1:44.6
12	18	Martin Fritz	Austria	1:51	25:02.4	14	26:53.4	+1:45.7
13	13	Yoshito Watabe	Japan	1:29	25:25.2	23	26:54.2	+1:46.5
14	1	Ryota Yamamoto	Japan	0:00	26:54.3	34	26:54.3	+1:46.6
15	17	Ben Loomis	United States	1:50	25:07.8	16	26:57.8	+1:50.1
16	22	Raffaele Buzzi	Italy	2:12	24:47.3	10	26:59.3	+1:51.6
17	19	Eero Hirvonen	Finland	1:56	25:06.3	15	27:02.3	+1:54.6
18	12	Mattéo Baud	France	1:27	25:42.0	25	27:09.0	+2:01.3
19	24	Jared Shumate	United States	2:15	24:55.0	13	27:10.0	+2:02.3
20	14	Tomáš Portyk	Czech Republic	1:29	25:47.4	26	27:16.4	+2:08.7
21	25	Lukáš Daněk	Czech Republic	2:19	25:22.8	22	27:41.8	+2:34.1
22	28	Perttu Reponen	Finland	2:35	25:09.7	18	27:44.7	+2:37.0
23	27	Arttu Mäkiaho	Finland	2:32	25:14.3	19	27:46.3	+2:38.6
24	34	Taylor Fletcher	United States	3:19	24:31.9	6	27:50.9	+2:43.2
25	33	Stephen Schumann	United States	3:06	24:46.4	8	27:52.4	+2:44.7
26	29	Jan Vytrval	Czech Republic	2:38	25:26.7	24	28:04.7	+2:57.0
27	15	Espen Bjørnstad	Norway	1:32	26:40.1	32	28:12.1	+3:04.4
28	21	Laurent Mühlethaler	France	2:02	26:24.6	31	28:26.6	+3:18.9
29	23	Ondřej Pažout	Czech Republic	2:12	26:19.4	30	28:31.4	+3:23.7
30	6	Sora Yachi	Japan	1:04	27:34.6	40	28:38.6	+3:30.9
31	30	Gaël Blondeau	France	2:47	25:56.3	27	28:43.3	+3:35.6
32	40	Alessandro Pittin	Italy	4:40	24:53.4	12	29:33.4	+4:25.7
33	26	Iacopo Bortolas	Italy	2:24	27:30.8	38	29:54.8	+4:47.1
34	32	Szczepan Kupczak	Poland	3:02	27:22.3	37	30:24.3	+5:16.6
35	37	Andrzej Szczechowicz	Poland	3:46	26:40.2	33	30:26.2	+5:18.5
36	35	Dmytro Mazurchuk	Ukraine	3:22	27:08.3	35	30:30.3	+5:22.6
37	31	Vid Vrhovnik	Slovenia	3:00	27:34.5	39	30:34.5	+5:26.8
38	41	Viacheslav Barkov	ROC	4:46	26:08.2	28	30:54.2	+5:46.5
39	39	Artem Galunin	ROC	4:25	27:13.8	36	31:38.8	+6:31.1
40	44	Samir Mastiev	ROC	5:41	26:18.0	29	31:59.0	+6:51.3
41	38	Chingiz Rakparov	Kazakhstan	4:12	27:51.1	41	32:03.1	+6:55.4
42	36	Park Je-un	South Korea	3:23	29:11.3	43	32:34.3	+7:26.6
43	42	Zhao Jiawen	China	4:56	28:33.8	42	33:29.8	+8:22.1
44	43	Markuss Vinogradovs	Latvia	5:12	29:22.4	44	34:34.4	+9:26.7
