= Nordic combined at the 2022 Winter Olympics – Individual large hill/10 km =

Individual large hill/10 km at the XXIV Olympic Winter Games
- Nordic combined
- Venue: Kuyangshu Nordic Center and Biathlon Center, Zhangjiakou
- Date: 15 February 2022
- Competitors: 48 from 18 nations
- Winning time: 27:13.3

Medalists
| 1st place, gold medalist(s) | | Jørgen Graabak | Norway |
| 2nd place, silver medalist(s) | | Jens Lurås Oftebro | Norway |
| 3rd place, bronze medalist(s) | | Akito Watabe | Japan |

The individual large hill/10 km competition in Nordic combined at the 2022 Winter Olympics was held on 15 February, at the Kuyangshu Nordic Center and Biathlon Center in Zhangjiakou. Jørgen Graabak of Norway won the gold medal, replicating his 2014 success. Jens Lurås Oftebro, also of Norway, became the silver medalist, his first Olympic medal. Akito Watabe of Japan won bronze.

Johannes Rydzek was the defending champion. The 2018 silver medalist, Fabian Rießle, did not qualify for the Olympics, but the bronze medalist, Eric Frenzel, did. Johannes Lamparter was the overall leader of the 2021–22 FIS Nordic Combined World Cup before the Olympics, followed by Jarl Magnus Riiber and Vinzenz Geiger. Lamparter is also the 2021 World Champion in individual large hill/10 km.

== Results ==
=== Ski jumping ===
The ski jumping part was held at 16:00.

| Rank | Bib | Name | Country | Distance (m) | Points | Deficit |
|---|---|---|---|---|---|---|
| 1 | 47 | Jarl Magnus Riiber | Norway | 142.0 | 139.8 | — |
| 2 | 44 | Kristjan Ilves | Estonia | 140.0 | 128.7 | +0:44 |
| 2 | 40 | Ryota Yamamoto | Japan | 140.0 | 128.7 | +0:44 |
| 4 | 35 | Manuel Faißt | Germany | 133.0 | 128.0 | +0:47 |
| 5 | 41 | Akito Watabe | Japan | 135.0 | 126.4 | +0:54 |
| 6 | 33 | Franz-Josef Rehrl | Austria | 135.5 | 121.9 | +1:12 |
| 7 | 38 | Mario Seidl | Austria | 130.0 | 119.5 | +1:21 |
| 8 | 48 | Johannes Lamparter | Austria | 128.0 | 118.1 | +1:27 |
| 9 | 43 | Julian Schmid | Germany | 133.5 | 116.0 | +1:35 |
| 10 | 42 | Jens Lurås Oftebro | Norway | 127.5 | 113.0 | +1:47 |
| 11 | 34 | Lukas Greiderer | Austria | 129.0 | 112.8 | +1:48 |
| 12 | 45 | Jørgen Graabak | Norway | 126.5 | 108.0 | +2:07 |
| 13 | 36 | Espen Andersen | Norway | 125.0 | 106.9 | +2:12 |
| 14 | 46 | Vinzenz Geiger | Germany | 122.0 | 106.0 | +2:15 |
| 15 | 39 | Johannes Rydzek | Germany | 123.5 | 105.2 | +2:18 |
| 16 | 20 | Mattéo Baud | France | 127.5 | 103.7 | +2:24 |
| 17 | 27 | Ben Loomis | United States | 129.0 | 103.4 | +2:26 |
| 18 | 26 | Antoine Gérard | France | 129.5 | 101.9 | +2:32 |
| 19 | 19 | Jared Shumate | United States | 127.5 | 101.3 | +2:34 |
| 20 | 12 | Ondřej Pažout | Czech Republic | 123.5 | 99.0 | +2:43 |
| 21 | 25 | Raffaele Buzzi | Italy | 124.0 | 98.7 | +2:44 |
| 22 | 28 | Tomáš Portyk | Czech Republic | 128.0 | 97.8 | +2:48 |
| 23 | 16 | Jan Vytrval | Czech Republic | 125.0 | 97.0 | +2:51 |
| 24 | 31 | Laurent Mühlethaler | France | 123.5 | 96.9 | +2:52 |
| 25 | 37 | Ilkka Herola | Finland | 117.5 | 95.9 | +2:56 |
| 26 | 29 | Eero Hirvonen | Finland | 123.0 | 94.6 | +3:01 |
| 27 | 32 | Yoshito Watabe | Japan | 118.0 | 94.4 | +3:02 |
| 28 | 24 | Arttu Mäkiaho | Finland | 121.0 | 87.9 | +3:28 |
| 29 | 8 | Iacopo Bortolas | Italy | 121.5 | 87.7 | +3:28 |
| 30 | 13 | Szczepan Kupczak | Poland | 121.5 | 86.3 | +3:34 |
| 31 | 18 | Lukáš Daněk | Czech Republic | 117.0 | 86.1 | +3:35 |
| 32 | 30 | Hideaki Nagai | Japan | 117.0 | 83.7 | +3:44 |
| 33 | 11 | Dmytro Mazurchuk | Ukraine | 116.0 | 83.5 | +3:45 |
| 34 | 17 | Vid Vrhovnik | Slovenia | 114.0 | 82.4 | +3:50 |
| 35 | 23 | Taylor Fletcher | United States | 117.0 | 81.2 | +3:54 |
| 36 | 4 | Jasper Good | United States | 115.5 | 79.8 | +4:00 |
| 37 | 22 | Otto Niittykoski | Finland | 118.0 | 79.2 | +4:02 |
| 38 | 5 | Chingiz Rakparov | Kazakhstan | 111.5 | 69.6 | +4:41 |
| 39 | 10 | Park Je-un | South Korea | 107.0 | 67.9 | +4:48 |
| 40 | 21 | Samuel Costa | Italy | 110.0 | 64.3 | +5:02 |
| 41 | 14 | Gaël Blondeau | France | 103.5 | 59.3 | +5:22 |
| 42 | 1 | Artem Galunin | ROC | 108.5 | 58.0 | +5:27 |
| 43 | 15 | Alessandro Pittin | Italy | 105.0 | 55.8 | +5:36 |
| 44 | 9 | Viacheslav Barkov | ROC | 103.0 | 53.3 | +5:46 |
| 45 | 2 | Andrzej Szczechowicz | Poland | 93.0 | 44.6 | +6:21 |
| 46 | 6 | Zhao Jiawen | China | 93.0 | 32.7 | +7:08 |
| 47 | 3 | Markuss Vinogradovs | Latvia | 88.0 | 30.9 | +7:16 |
| 48 | 7 | Samir Mastiev | ROC | 86.5 | 20.4 | +7:58 |

=== Cross-country ===
The cross-country part was held at 18:30.

| Rank | Bib | Name | Country | Start time | Cross-country | | Finish time | Deficit |
| Rank | Bib | Name | Country | Start time | Time | Rank | Finish time | Deficit |
|---|---|---|---|---|---|---|---|---|
| 1st place, gold medalist(s) | 12 | Jørgen Graabak | Norway | 2:07 | 25:06.3 | 1 | 27:13.3 | — |
| 2nd place, silver medalist(s) | 10 | Jens Lurås Oftebro | Norway | 1:47 | 25:26.7 | 2 | 27:13.7 | +0.4 |
| 3rd place, bronze medalist(s) | 5 | Akito Watabe | Japan | 0:54 | 26:19.9 | 10 | 27:13.9 | +0.6 |
| 4 | 4 | Manuel Faißt | Germany | 0:47 | 26:29.6 | 15 | 27:16.6 | +3.3 |
| 5 | 11 | Lukas Greiderer | Austria | 1:48 | 25:37.1 | 4 | 27:25.1 | +11.8 |
| 6 | 8 | Johannes Lamparter | Austria | 1:27 | 26:04.3 | 8 | 27:31.3 | +18.0 |
| 7 | 14 | Vinzenz Geiger | Germany | 2:15 | 25:29.5 | 3 | 27:44.5 | +31.2 |
| 8 | 1 | Jarl Magnus Riiber | Norway | 0:00 | 27:53.1 | 36 | 27:53.1 | +39.8 |
| 9 | 2 | Kristjan Ilves | Estonia | 0:44 | 27:29.5 | 29 | 28:13.5 | +1:00.2 |
| 10 | 9 | Julian Schmid | Germany | 1:35 | 26:39.1 | 17 | 28:14.1 | +1:00.8 |
| 11 | 6 | Franz-Josef Rehrl | Austria | 1:12 | 27:10.2 | 23 | 28:22.2 | +1:08.9 |
| 12 | 3 | Ryota Yamamoto | Japan | 0:44 | 27:44.1 | 34 | 28:28.1 | +1:14.8 |
| 13 | 7 | Mario Seidl | Austria | 1:21 | 27:07.5 | 21 | 28:28.5 | +1:15.2 |
| 14 | 18 | Antoine Gérard | France | 2:32 | 26:20.4 | 11 | 28:52.4 | +1:39.1 |
| 15 | 13 | Espen Andersen | Norway | 2:12 | 26:45.2 | 18 | 28:57.2 | +1:43.9 |
| 16 | 25 | Ilkka Herola | Finland | 2:56 | 26:02.1 | 7 | 28:58.1 | +1:44.8 |
| 17 | 19 | Jared Shumate | United States | 2:34 | 26:24.5 | 13 | 28:58.5 | +1:45.2 |
| 18 | 23 | Jan Vytrval | Czech Republic | 2:51 | 26:26.1 | 14 | 29:17.1 | +2:03.8 |
| 19 | 17 | Ben Loomis | United States | 2:26 | 26:51.2 | 19 | 29:17.2 | +2:03.9 |
| 20 | 26 | Eero Hirvonen | Finland | 3:01 | 26:16.3 | 9 | 29:17.3 | +2:04.0 |
| 21 | 16 | Mattéo Baud | France | 2:24 | 26:54.4 | 20 | 29:18.4 | +2:05.1 |
| 22 | 21 | Raffaele Buzzi | Italy | 2:44 | 26:34.9 | 16 | 29:18.9 | +2:05.6 |
| 23 | 35 | Taylor Fletcher | United States | 3:54 | 25:42.7 | 5 | 29:36.7 | +2:23.4 |
| 24 | 28 | Arttu Mäkiaho | Finland | 3:28 | 26:21.0 | 12 | 29:49.0 | +2:35.7 |
| 25 | 27 | Yoshito Watabe | Japan | 3:02 | 27:08.7 | 22 | 30:10.7 | +2:57.4 |
| 26 | 24 | Laurent Mühlethaler | France | 2:52 | 27:27.6 | 27 | 30:19.6 | +3:06.3 |
| 27 | 22 | Tomáš Portyk | Czech Republic | 2:48 | 27:32.6 | 31 | 30:20.6 | +3:07.3 |
| 28 | 15 | Johannes Rydzek | Germany | 2:18 | 28:04.0 | 39 | 30:22.0 | +3:08.7 |
| 29 | 20 | Ondřej Pažout | Czech Republic | 2:43 | 27:46.7 | 35 | 30:29.7 | +3:16.4 |
| 30 | 31 | Lukáš Daněk | Czech Republic | 3:35 | 27:32.3 | 30 | 31:07.3 | +3:54.0 |
| 31 | 32 | Hideaki Nagai | Japan | 3:44 | 27:28.9 | 28 | 31:12.9 | +3:59.6 |
| 32 | 33 | Dmytro Mazurchuk | Ukraine | 3:45 | 27:35.4 | 33 | 31:20.4 | +4:07.1 |
| 33 | 43 | Alessandro Pittin | Italy | 5:36 | 25:55.8 | 6 | 31:31.8 | +4:18.5 |
| 34 | 36 | Jasper Good | United States | 4:00 | 27:32.9 | 32 | 31:32.9 | +4:19.6 |
| 35 | 30 | Szczepan Kupczak | Poland | 3:34 | 28:25.8 | 42 | 31:59.8 | +4:46.5 |
| 36 | 34 | Vid Vrhovnik | Slovenia | 3:50 | 28:11.8 | 41 | 32:01.8 | +4:48.5 |
| 37 | 37 | Otto Niittykoski | Finland | 4:02 | 28:00.3 | 38 | 32:02.3 | +4:49.0 |
| 38 | 40 | Samuel Costa | Italy | 5:02 | 27:20.3 | 25 | 32:22.3 | +5:09.0 |
| 39 | 29 | Iacopo Bortolas | Italy | 3:28 | 29:01.6 | 43 | 32:29.6 | +5:16.3 |
| 40 | 41 | Gaël Blondeau | France | 5:22 | 27:20.8 | 26 | 32:42.8 | +5:29.5 |
| 41 | 44 | Viacheslav Barkov | ROC | 5:46 | 27:10.9 | 24 | 32:56.9 | +5:43.6 |
| 42 | 42 | Artem Galunin | ROC | 5:27 | 27:55.2 | 37 | 33:22.2 | +6:08.9 |
| 43 | 38 | Chingiz Rakparov | Kazakhstan | 4:41 | 30:07.5 | 46 | 34:48.5 | +7:35.2 |
| 44 | 39 | Park Je-un | South Korea | 4:48 | 30:08.5 | 47 | 34:56.5 | +7:43.2 |
| 45 | 45 | Andrzej Szczechowicz | Poland | 6:21 | 29:27.5 | 44 | 35:48.5 | +8:35.2 |
| 46 | 48 | Samir Mastiev | ROC | 7:58 | 28:09.4 | 40 | 36:07.4 | +8:54.1 |
| 47 | 46 | Zhao Jiawen | China | 7:08 | 29:33.1 | 45 | 36:41.1 | +9:27.8 |
| | 47 | Markuss Vinogradovs | Latvia | 7:16 | Did not finish | | | |
