= Biathlon at the 2022 Winter Olympics – Mixed relay =

Mixed relay at the XXIV Olympic Winter Games
- Biathlon
- Venue: Hualindong Ski Resort
- Date: 5 February 2022
- Competitors: 80 from 20 nations
- Teams: 20
- Winning time: 1:06:45.6

Medalists
1st place, gold medalist(s)		Marte Olsbu Røiseland; Tiril Eckhoff; Tarjei Bø; Johannes Thingnes Bø	Norway
2nd place, silver medalist(s)		Anaïs Chevalier-Bouchet; Julia Simon; Émilien Jacquelin; Quentin Fillon Maillet	France
3rd place, bronze medalist(s)		Uliana Nigmatullina; Kristina Reztsova; Alexander Loginov; Eduard Latypov	ROC

The mixed relay competition of the 2022 Winter Olympics was held on 5 February, at the National Biathlon Centre, in the Zhangjiakou cluster of competition venues, 180 kilometres (110 mi) north of Beijing, at an elevation of 1,665 metres (5,463 ft). The event was won by Norway. France was second, and the Russian Olympic Committee third.

== Summary ==
The defending champions were France, and the 2018 silver and bronze medalists were Norway and Italy, respectively. There was only one mixed relay in the 2021–22 Biathlon World Cup before the Olympics, won by Norway, with Belarus second and France third. Norway were also the 2021 world champion.

Marte Olsbu Røiseland comfortably won the first leg for Norway, who was 15 seconds ahead of Italy, followed by Belarus, Sweden, and the Russian Olympic Committee. For France, Anaïs Chevalier-Bouchet had to ski two penalty loops and was in the ninth position. However, in the second leg Norway's Tiril Eckhoff got three penalty loops and dropped to the fifth position. Julia Simon brought France to the leading position after the second leg, 4 seconds ahead of Italy, fifteen ahead of Sweden, and 30 seconds ahead of the United States and Norway. Meanwhile, Kristina Reztsova had to ski a penalty loop on her leg, and the Russian Olympic Committee dropped to seventh, a minute behind France. Alexander Loginov was the fastest in the third leg, bringing the Russian Olympic Committee to the leading position. Sweden was second, France dropped to third due to Émilien Jacquelin being on the penalty loop twice on his standing shoot. The United States were still fourth, and Norway fifth, all four teams approximately 20 seconds behind the leader. Italy dropped to seventh after a penalty loop of Thomas Bormolini and was not able to return to medal contention. On the last leg Quentin Fillon Maillet caught up with Eduard Latypov and Johannes Thingnes Bø caught over 9 seconds. At the finish Bø outsprinted Fillon Maillet and Latypov, and Norway won the gold medal ahead of France and the Russia Olympic Committee.

== Results ==
The race was started at 17:00.

Rank	Bib	Country	Time	Penalties (P+S)	Deficit
1st place, gold medalist(s)	1	Norway Marte Olsbu Røiseland; Tiril Eckhoff; Tarjei Bø; Johannes Thingnes Bø	1:06:45.6; 17:18.6; 19:12.6; 15:31.1; 14:43.3	1+6 2+7; 0+1 0+0; 1+3 2+3; 0+0 0+3; 0+2 0+1	
2nd place, silver medalist(s)	3	France Anaïs Chevalier-Bouchet; Julia Simon; Émilien Jacquelin; Quentin Fillon Maillet	1:06:46.5; 18:43.7; 17:17.7; 15:56.3; 14:48.8	0+5 3+6; 0+2 1+3; 0+2 0+0; 0+0 2+3; 0+1 0+0	+0.9
3rd place, bronze medalist(s)	5	ROC Uliana Nigmatullina; Kristina Reztsova; Alexander Loginov; Eduard Latypov	1:06:47.1; 18:16.0; 18:46.1; 14:38.3; 15:06.7	0+4 1+9; 0+2 0+3; 0+1 1+3; 0+0 0+2; 0+1 0+1	+1.5
4	4	Sweden Hanna Öberg; Elvira Öberg; Martin Ponsiluoma; Sebastian Samuelsson	1:07:26.6; 18:02.6; 18:13.8; 15:41.1; 15:29.1	0+7 0+6; 0+2 0+1; 0+3 0+2; 0+0 0+3; 0+2 0+0	+41.0
5	6	Germany Vanessa Voigt; Denise Herrmann; Benedikt Doll; Philipp Nawrath	1:07:51.1; 19:37.1; 18:00.0; 15:23.0; 14:51.0	1+10 1+8; 1+3 1+3; 0+3 0+3; 0+3 0+1; 0+1 0+1	+1:05.5
6	2	Belarus Dzinara Alimbekava; Hanna Sola; Mikita Labastau; Anton Smolski	1:08:00.2; 17:49.8; 19:05.0; 15:32.8; 15:32.6	0+6 2+8; 0+1 0+1; 0+3 2+3; 0+0 0+2; 0+2 0+2	+1:14.6
7	19	United States Susan Dunklee; Clare Egan; Sean Doherty; Paul Schommer	1:08:58.3; 18:52.3; 17:38.8; 15:27.8; 16:59.4	1+8 0+4; 0+3 0+2; 0+1 0+0; 0+1 0+0; 1+3 0+2	+2:12.7
8	14	Switzerland Amy Baserga; Lena Häcki; Benjamin Weger; Sebastian Stalder	1:09:06.0; 18:39.9; 18:44.0; 15:23.8; 16:18.3	2+6 0+5; 1+3 0+1; 1+3 0+1; 0+0 0+1; 0+0 0+2	+2:20.4
9	7	Italy Lisa Vittozzi; Dorothea Wierer; Thomas Bormolini; Lukas Hofer	1:09:25.3; 17:35.3; 18:30.2; 16:23.0; 16:56.8	0+4 2+10; 0+0 0+1; 0+1 0+3; 0+0 1+3; 0+3 1+3	+2:39.7
10	11	Austria Julia Schwaiger; Lisa Theresa Hauser; Simon Eder; Felix Leitner	1:09:44.2; 19:25.7; 18:41.6; 15:49.8; 15:47.1	1+6 1+7; 0+2 1+3; 1+3 0+0; 0+1 0+3; 0+0 0+1	+2:58.6
11	8	Finland Suvi Minkkinen; Mari Eder; Tero Seppälä; Olli Hiidensalo	1:10:06.7; 19:24.1; 18:14.2; 15:12.5; 17:15.9	1+6 0+6; 0+0 0+0; 0+2 0+3; 0+1 0+0; 1+3 0+3	+3:21.1
12	9	Czech Republic Jessica Jislová; Markéta Davidová; Mikuláš Karlík; Michal Krčmář	1:10:20.2; 18:40.2; 18:44.1; 17:11.7; 15:44.2	2+7 1+10; 0+3 0+2; 0+0 0+3; 2+3 1+3; 0+1 0+2	+3:34.6
13	10	Ukraine Valentyna Semerenko; Yuliia Dzhima; Artem Pryma; Dmytro Pidruchnyi	1:10:21.7; 20:46.4; 17:50.2; 15:45.1; 16:00.0	3+9 1+6; 2+3 1+3; 0+0 0+2; 0+3 0+1; 1+3 0+0	+3:36.1
14	18	Canada Sarah Beaudry; Emma Lunder; Christian Gow; Scott Gow	1:11:12.4; 19:48.9; 18:48.1; 16:30.5; 16:04.9	0+5 3+12; 0+1 0+3; 0+1 0+3; 0+3 2+3; 0+0 1+3	+4:26.8
15	12	China Meng Fanqi; Chu Yuanmeng; Yan Xingyuan; Cheng Fangming	1:11:28.1; 19:15.9; 19:46.1; 16:20.4; 16:05.7	0+3 0+9; 0+0 0+3; 0+3 0+2; 0+0 0+2; 0+0 0+2	+4:42.5
16	13	Estonia Regina Oja; Tuuli Tomingas; Rene Zahkna; Kristo Siimer	1:11:56.5; 18:50.6; 19:19.0; 16:13.1; 17:33.8	0+8 1+6; 0+3 0+1; 0+0 1+3; 0+2 0+0; 0+3 0+2	+5:10.9
17	15	Slovakia Ivona Fialková; Paulína Fialková; Michal Šíma; Tomáš Sklenárik	LAP; 19:59.3; 19:45.2; LAP	3+3 0+3; 1+3 0+1; 5+3	
18	20	Japan Fuyuko Tachizaki; Sari Maeda; Tsukasa Kobonoki; Kosuke Ozaki	LAP; 19:53.9; LAP	0+3 0+3; 0+2 3+3	
19	17	Bulgaria Milena Todorova; Maria Zdravkova; Vladimir Iliev; Dimitar Gerdzhikov	LAP; 19:38.6; LAP	0+2 1+3; 0+1 2+3	
20	16	Slovenia Polona Klemenčič; Živa Klemenčič; Jakov Fak; Miha Dovžan	LAP; 19:15.0; LAP	0+1 0+3; 3+3 1+3	
