= Norway at the 2022 Winter Olympics =

- Flag of Norway
- IOC code: NOR
- NOC: Norwegian Olympic and Paralympic Committee and Confederation of Sports
- Website: www.teamnor.no (in Norwegian)

in Beijing, China 4–20 February 2022
- Competitors: 84 (54 men and 30 women) in 9 sports
- Flag bearers (opening): Kjetil Jansrud; Kristin Skaslien
- Flag bearer (closing): Marte Olsbu Røiseland
- Medals Ranked 1st: Gold 16 Silver 8 Bronze 13 Total 37

Winter Olympics appearances (overview)
- 1924; 1928; 1932; 1936; 1948; 1952; 1956; 1960; 1964; 1968; 1972; 1976; 1980; 1984; 1988; 1992; 1994; 1998; 2002; 2006; 2010; 2014; 2018; 2022; 2026

Norway competed at the 2022 Winter Olympics in Beijing, China, from 4 to 20 February 2022. The Norwegian team consisted of 84 athletes. Kjetil Jansrud and Kristin Skaslien were the country's flagbearers during the opening ceremony. Biathlete Marte Olsbu Røiseland was the flagbearer during the closing ceremony.

Three days before the closing ceremony, Norway won its 14th gold medal, thus matching its record performance of 2018, as well as Canada's 2010 and Germany's 2018 results. Norway won its 15th gold medal on 18 February, thus breaking the record. This should be seen in light of the ongoing medal inflation, e.g., from 16 gold medals in 1924 to 109 in 2022. However, Norway also holds the medal inflation-adjusted records: in 1936, Norwegian athletes won 41% of all events (7 out of 17), in 1928, 43% (6 out of 14). As of 20 February 2022, this percentage for the 2022 Games stands at ~14%.

== Medalists ==
The following Norwegian competitors won medals at the Games. In the discipline sections below, the medalists' names are bolded.

Multiple medalists
**Name**	**Sport**	1st place, gold medalist(s)	2nd place, silver medalist(s)	3rd place, bronze medalist(s)	Total
Johannes Thingnes Bø	Biathlon	4	0	1	5
Marte Olsbu Røiseland	Biathlon	3	0	2	5
Therese Johaug	Cross-country skiing	3	0	0	3
Tarjei Bø	Biathlon	2	1	1	4
Johannes Høsflot Klæbo	Cross-country skiing	2	1	1	4
Jørgen Graabak	Nordic combined	2	1	0	3
Tiril Eckhoff	Biathlon	1	1	1	3
Jens Lurås Oftebro	Nordic combined	1	1	0	2
Hallgeir Engebråten	Speed skating	1	0	1	2
Vetle Sjåstad Christiansen	Biathlon	1	0	1	2
Aleksander Aamodt Kilde	Alpine skiing	0	1	1	2

Medals by gender
**Gender**	1st place, gold medalist(s)	2nd place, silver medalist(s)	3rd place, bronze medalist(s)	**Total**
Male	10	6	9	**25**
Female	5	1	3	**9**
Mixed	1	1	1	**3**
Total	16	8	13	37

Medals by sport
**Sport**	1st place, gold medalist(s)	2nd place, silver medalist(s)	3rd place, bronze medalist(s)	Total
Biathlon	6	2	6	14
Cross-country skiing	5	1	2	8
Nordic combined	2	2	0	4
Speed skating	1	0	2	3
Freestyle skiing	1	0	0	1
Ski jumping	1	0	0	1
Alpine skiing	0	1	3	4
Curling	0	1	0	1
Snowboarding	0	1	0	1
Total	16	8	13	37

Medals by date
**Day**	**Date**	1st place, gold medalist(s)	2nd place, silver medalist(s)	3rd place, bronze medalist(s)	Total
Day 1	5 February	2	0	0	2
Day 2	6 February	0	0	1	1
Day 3	7 February	0	0	1	1
Day 4	8 February	1	1	2	4
Day 5	9 February	1	1	0	2
Day 6	10 February	1	1	0	2
Day 7	11 February	1	0	1	2
Day 8	12 February	2	0	1	3
Day 9	13 February	1	2	1	4
Day 10	14 February	0	0	0	0
Day 11	15 February	3	2	0	5
Day 12	16 February	1	0	1	2
Day 13	17 February	1	0	0	1
Day 14	18 February	1	1	3	5
Day 15	19 February	0	0	1	1
Day 16	20 February	1	0	1	2
Total		16	8	13	37

Medal	Name	Sport	Event	Date
Gold	Therese Johaug	Cross-country skiing	Women's 15 km skiathlon	5 February
Gold	Marte Olsbu Røiseland; Tiril Eckhoff; Tarjei Bø; Johannes Thingnes Bø	Biathlon	Mixed relay	5 February
Gold	Johannes Høsflot Klæbo	Cross-country skiing	Men's sprint	8 February
Gold	Birk Ruud	Freestyle skiing	Men's Big air	9 February
Gold	Therese Johaug	Cross-country skiing	Women's 10 km classical	10 February
Gold	Marte Olsbu Røiseland	Biathlon	Women's sprint	11 February
Gold	Johannes Thingnes Bø	Biathlon	Men's sprint	12 February
Gold	Marius Lindvik	Ski jumping	Men's large hill individual	12 February
Gold	Marte Olsbu Røiseland	Biathlon	Women's pursuit	13 February
Gold	Sturla Holm Lægreid; Tarjei Bø; Johannes Thingnes Bø; Vetle Sjåstad Christiansen	Biathlon	Men's Relay	15 February
Gold	Hallgeir Engebråten; Peder Kongshaug; Sverre Lunde Pedersen	Speed skating	Men's team pursuit	15 February
Gold	Jørgen Graabak	Nordic combined	Individual large hill/10 km	15 February
Gold	Erik Valnes; Johannes Høsflot Klæbo	Cross-country skiing	Men's team sprint	16 February
Gold	Jørgen Graabak; Jens Lurås Oftebro; Espen Bjørnstad; Espen Andersen	Nordic combined	Team large hill/4 × 5 km	17 February
Gold	Johannes Thingnes Bø	Biathlon	Men's mass start	18 February
Gold	Therese Johaug	Cross-country skiing	Women's 30 kilometre freestyle	20 February
Silver	Kristin Skaslien; Magnus Nedregotten	Curling	Mixed doubles	8 February
Silver	Jørgen Graabak	Nordic combined	Individual normal hill/10 km	9 February
Silver	Aleksander Aamodt Kilde	Alpine skiing	Men's combined	10 February
Silver	Emil Iversen; Pål Golberg; Hans Christer Holund; Johannes Høsflot Klæbo	Cross-country skiing	Men's 4 × 10 km relay	13 February
Silver	Tarjei Bø	Biathlon	Men's pursuit	13 February
Silver	Mons Røisland	Snowboarding	Men's big air	15 February
Silver	Jens Lurås Oftebro	Nordic combined	Individual large hill/10 km	15 February
Silver	Tiril Eckhoff	Biathlon	Women's mass start	18 February
Bronze	Hallgeir Engebråten	Speed skating	Men's 5000 metres	6 February
Bronze	Marte Olsbu Røiseland	Biathlon	Women's individual	7 February
Bronze	Aleksander Aamodt Kilde	Alpine skiing	Men's super-G	8 February
Bronze	Johannes Thingnes Bø	Biathlon	Men's individual	8 February
Bronze	Johannes Høsflot Klæbo	Cross-country skiing	Men's 15 km classical	11 February
Bronze	Tarjei Bø	Biathlon	Men's sprint	12 February
Bronze	Tiril Eckhoff	Biathlon	Women's pursuit	13 February
Bronze	Sebastian Foss-Solevåg	Alpine skiing	Men's slalom	16 February
Bronze	Marte Olsbu Røiseland	Biathlon	Women's mass start	18 February
Bronze	Håvard Holmefjord Lorentzen	Speed skating	Men's 1000 metres	18 February
Bronze	Vetle Sjåstad Christiansen	Biathlon	Men's mass start	18 February
Bronze	Simen Hegstad Krüger	Cross-country skiing	Men's 50 kilometre freestyle	19 February
Bronze	Mina Fürst Holtmann; Thea Louise Stjernesund; Maria Therese Tviberg; Timon Haugan; Fabian Wilkens Solheim; Rasmus Windingstad	Alpine skiing	Mixed team	20 February

== Competitors ==
The following is the list of number of competitors participating at the Games per sport/discipline.

#	Sport	Men	Women	Total	Events
1	Alpine skiing	10	4	14	26
2	Biathlon	6	6	12	34
3	Cross-country skiing	8	8	16	27
4	Curling	5	1	6	2
5	Freestyle skiing	4	2	6	13
6	Nordic combined	5	—N/a	5	9
7	Ski jumping	6	3	9	13
8	Snowboarding	3	1	4	8
9	Speed skating	7	5	12	24
Total		54	30	84	155

== Alpine skiing ==
Norway qualified ten male and nine female alpine skiers, but returned five of their female quotas.

Men

Athlete	Event	Run 1		Run 2		Total	
Athlete	Event	Time	Rank	Time	Rank	Time	Rank
Aleksander Aamodt Kilde	Combined	1:43.12	1	48.90	6	2:32.02	2nd place, silver medalist(s)
Aleksander Aamodt Kilde	Downhill	—N/a				1:43.20	5
Kjetil Jansrud	Downhill	—N/a				DNS	
Adrian Smiseth Sejersted	Downhill	—N/a				1:43:82	11
Lucas Braathen	Giant slalom	1:04.20	12	DNF			
Henrik Kristoffersen	Giant slalom	1:03.05	4	1:08.20	18	2:11.25	8
Atle Lie McGrath	Giant slalom	DNF		Did not advance			
Rasmus Windingstad	Giant slalom	DNF		Did not advance			
Lucas Braathen	Slalom	DNF		Did not advance			
Sebastian Foss-Solevåg	Slalom	53.98	3	50.81	15	1:44:79	3rd place, bronze medalist(s)
Henrik Kristoffersen	Slalom	53.94	2	50.94	18	1:44.88	4
Atle Lie McGrath	Slalom	55.08	14	1:02.27	41	1:57.35	31
Aleksander Aamodt Kilde	Super-G	—N/a				1:20.36	3rd place, bronze medalist(s)
Kjetil Jansrud	Super-G	—N/a				1:23.00	23
Adrian Smiseth Sejersted	Super-G	—N/a				1:20.68	4
Rasmus Windingstad	Super-G	—N/a				1:24.15	29

Women

Athlete	Event	Run 1		Run 2		Total	
Athlete	Event	Time	Rank	Time	Rank	Time	Rank
Ragnhild Mowinckel	Downhill	—N/a				1:33.97	14
Mina Fürst Holtmann	Giant slalom	DNF		Did not advance			
Ragnhild Mowinckel	Giant slalom	58.58	5	58.07	6	1:56.65	5
Thea Louise Stjernesund	Giant slalom	59.39	15	57.50	2	1:56.89	6
Maria Therese Tviberg	Giant slalom	59.67	18	58.40	10	1:58.07	13
Mina Fürst Holtmann	Slalom	54.19	18	DNF			
Thea Louise Stjernesund	Slalom	54.22	19	53.26	16	1:47.48	15
Maria Therese Tviberg	Slalom	DNF		Did not advance			
Ragnhild Mowinckel	Super-G	—N/a				1:14.09	6

Mixed

Athlete	Event	Round of 16	Quarterfinal	Semifinal	Final / BM	
Athlete	Event	Opposition Result	Opposition Result	Opposition Result	Opposition Result	Rank
Mina Fürst Holtmann; Thea Louise Stjernesund; Maria Therese Tviberg; Timon Haugan; Fabian Wilkens Solheim; Rasmus Windingstad	Team	Poland; W 2*–2	France; W 2*–2	Austria; L 2–2*	United States; W 2*–2	3rd place, bronze medalist(s)

== Biathlon ==
Based on their Nations Cup rankings in the 2020–21 Biathlon World Cup and 2021–22 Biathlon World Cup, Norway has qualified a team of 6 men and 6 women.

Men

Athlete	Event	Time	Misses	Rank
Tarjei Bø	Individual	50:17.0	1 (0+0+0+1)	8
Tarjei Bø	Mass start	41:01.8	4 (0+1+2+1)	12
Tarjei Bø	Pursuit	39:36.1	1 (1+0+0+0)	2nd place, silver medalist(s)
Tarjei Bø	Sprint	24:39.3	1 (1+0)	3rd place, bronze medalist(s)
Vetle Sjåstad Christiansen	Individual	51:21.3	3 (1+2+0+0)	13
Vetle Sjåstad Christiansen	Mass start	39:26.9	3 (2+0+1+0)	3rd place, bronze medalist(s)
Vetle Sjåstad Christiansen	Pursuit	42:53.3	3 (0+1+0+2)	15
Vetle Sjåstad Christiansen	Sprint	25:38.4	3 (2+1)	20
Sturla Holm Lægreid	Individual	51:28.1	3 (1+1+1+0)	15
Sturla Holm Lægreid	Mass start	40:00.5	5 (1+2+1+1)	6
Sturla Holm Lægreid	Pursuit	43:40.5	10 (3+4+2+1)	24
Sturla Holm Lægreid	Sprint	25:02.7	2 (1+1)	7
Johannes Thingnes Bø	Individual	49:18.5	2 (1+0+0+1)	3rd place, bronze medalist(s)
Johannes Thingnes Bø	Mass start	38:14.4	4 (1+0+1+2)	1st place, gold medalist(s)
Johannes Thingnes Bø	Pursuit	41:21.2	7 (0+2+3+2)	5
Johannes Thingnes Bø	Sprint	24:00.4	1 (0+1)	1st place, gold medalist(s)
Sturla Holm Lægreid; Tarjei Bø; Johannes Thingnes Bø; Vetle Sjåstad Christiansen	Team relay	1:19:50.2	8 (1+7)	1st place, gold medalist(s)

Women

Athlete	Event	Time	Misses	Rank
Tiril Eckhoff	Individual	47:10.2	5 (0+2+0+3)	22
Tiril Eckhoff	Mass start	40:33.3	4 (0+0+2+2)	2nd place, silver medalist(s)
Tiril Eckhoff	Pursuit	34:46.9	3 (1+1+0+1)	3rd place, bronze medalist(s)
Tiril Eckhoff	Sprint	22:00.4	2 (1+1)	11
Emilie Ågheim Kalkenberg	Individual	49:08.8	4 (3+0+0+1)	38
Ingrid Landmark Tandrevold	Individual	45:15.4	1 (0+1+0+0)	8
Ingrid Landmark Tandrevold	Pursuit	37:39.9	1 (0+0+1+0)	14
Ingrid Landmark Tandrevold	Sprint	21:44.5	0 (0+0)	5
Marte Olsbu Røiseland	Individual	44:28.0	2 (1+0+0+1)	3rd place, bronze medalist(s)
Marte Olsbu Røiseland	Mass start	40:52.9	4 (0+0+2+2)	3rd place, bronze medalist(s)
Marte Olsbu Røiseland	Pursuit	34:46.9	1 (0+0+1+0)	1st place, gold medalist(s)
Marte Olsbu Røiseland	Sprint	20:44.3	0 (0+0)	1st place, gold medalist(s)
Ida Lien	Pursuit	39:22.1	4 (0+1+2+1)	33
Ida Lien	Sprint	23:10.3	4 (1+3)	38
Karoline Offigstad Knotten; Tiril Eckhoff; Ida Lien; Marte Olsbu Røiseland	Team relay	1:11:54.6	2+8	4

Mixed

Athlete	Event	Time	Misses	Rank
Marte Olsbu Røiseland; Tiril Eckhoff; Tarjei Bø; Johannes Thingnes Bø	Relay	1:06:45.6	3+13	1st place, gold medalist(s)

== Cross-country skiing ==
Norway qualified the maximum of eight male and eight female cross-country skiers.

The 2018 champion in the 30 km skiathlon, Simen Hegstad Krüger, qualified for the Olympics but tested positive for COVID just before the games. Even though he had no symptoms, he was not allowed to fly to China with the rest of the team to get a chance to defend the title. Earlier, Heidi Weng and Anne Kjersti Kalvå also tested positive and had to miss the Olympics. However, six days before the 50 km race was to start, Krüger had negative tests and was allowed to participate. He then won the bronze medal in the race, which then had been shortened to 28 km caused by weather conditions.

Distance
Men

Athlete	Event	Classical		Freestyle		Final		
Athlete	Event	Time	Rank	Time	Rank	Time	Deficit	Rank
Pål Golberg	15 km classical	—N/a				39:47.4	+1:52.6	11
Pål Golberg	30 km skiathlon	39:41.0	4	38:46.0	11	1:19:02.3	+2:52.5	5
Hans Christer Holund	15 km classical	—N/a				38:44.6	+49.8	4
Hans Christer Holund	30 km skiathlon	39:41.8	5	38:26.0	6	1:18:40.7	+2:30.9	4
Hans Christer Holund	50 km freestyle	—N/a				1:13:30.2	+1:57.5	13
Johannes Høsflot Klæbo	15 km classical	—N/a				38:32.3	+37.5	3rd place, bronze medalist(s)
Johannes Høsflot Klæbo	30 km skiathlon	40:42.1	11	43:59.7	49	1:25:15.8	+9:06.0	40
Johannes Høsflot Klæbo	50 km freestyle	—N/a				DNF		
Simen Hegstad Krüger	50 km freestyle	—N/a				1:11:39.7	+7.0	3rd place, bronze medalist(s)
Sjur Røthe	30 km skiathlon	DNF						–
Sjur Røthe	50 km freestyle	—N/a				1:11:48.5	+15.8	5
Erik Valnes	15 km classical	—N/a				40:06.8	+2:12.0	15
Emil Iversen; Pål Golberg; Hans Christer Holund; Johannes Høsflot Klæbo	4 x 10 km relay	—N/a				1:55:57.9	+1:07.2	2nd place, silver medalist(s)

Women

Athlete	Event	Classical		Freestyle		Final		
Athlete	Event	Time	Rank	Time	Rank	Time	Deficit	Rank
Therese Johaug	10 km classical	—N/a				28:05.3	—	1st place, gold medalist(s)
Therese Johaug	15 km skiathlon	22:28.3	1	21:09.0	2	44:13.7	—	1st place, gold medalist(s)
Therese Johaug	30 km freestyle	—N/a				1:24:54.0	—	1st place, gold medalist(s)
Mathilde Myhrvold	10 km classical	—N/a				31:36.0	+3:29.7	44
Lotta Udnes Weng	10 km classical	—N/a				30:37.0	+2:30.7	25
Lotta Udnes Weng	30 km freestyle	—N/a				1:31:14.3	+6:20.3	13
Tiril Udnes Weng	10 km classical	—N/a				30:22.6	+2:16.3	21
Tiril Udnes Weng	30 km freestyle	—N/a				1:31:15.4	+6:21.4	14
Helene Marie Fossesholm	15 km skiathlon	22:33.4	29	21:41.4	13	47:49.0	+3:35.3	18
Ragnhild Haga	15 km skiathlon	22:38.2	32	21:31.8	29	48:52.5	+4:38.8	29
Ragnhild Haga	30 km freestyle	—N/a				1:32:19.9	+7:25.9	28
Tiril Udnes Weng; Therese Johaug; Helene Marie Fossesholm; Ragnhild Haga	4 x 5 km relay	—N/a				54:09.8	+28.8	5

Sprint
Men

Athlete	Event	Qualification		Quarterfinal		Semifinal		Final	
Athlete	Event	Time	Rank	Time	Rank	Time	Rank	Time	Rank
Pål Golberg	Sprint	2:51.52	14 Q	3:14.81	5	Did not advance			21
Johannes Høsflot Klæbo	Sprint	2:46.74	3 Q	2:51.57	1 Q	2:52.23	2 Q	2:58.06	1st place, gold medalist(s)
Håvard Solås Taugbøl	Sprint	2:49.93	7 Q	2:57.93	2 Q	2:52.46	5	Did not advance	10
Erik Valnes	Sprint	2:51.56	15 Q	2:49.31	1 Q	3:13.28	6	Did not advance	11
Erik Valnes; Johannes Høsflot Klæbo	Team sprint	—N/a				20:17.28	1 Q	19:22.99	1st place, gold medalist(s)

Women

Athlete	Event	Qualification		Quarterfinal		Semifinal		Final	
Athlete	Event	Time	Rank	Time	Rank	Time	Rank	Time	Rank
Maiken Caspersen Falla	Sprint	3:20.86	16 Q	3:16.88	2 Q	3:16.41	4	Did not advance	8
Mathilde Myhrvold	Sprint	3:21.24	19 Q	3:24.62	5	Did not advance			21
Lotta Udnes Weng	Sprint	3:22.26	23 Q	3:21.21	5	Did not advance			22
Tiril Udnes Weng	Sprint	3:18.17	7 Q	3:21.31	2 Q	3:14.29	5	Did not advance	9
Tiril Udnes Weng; Maiken Caspersen Falla	Team sprint	—N/a				23:05.06	4 Q	23:15.28	8

== Curling ==
Summary

Team	Event	Group stage										Semifinal	Final / BM	
Team	Event	Opposition Score	Opposition Score	Opposition Score	Opposition Score	Opposition Score	Opposition Score	Opposition Score	Opposition Score	Opposition Score	Rank	Opposition Score	Opposition Score	Rank
Steffen Walstad; Torger Nergård; Markus Høiberg; Magnus Vågberg; Magnus Nedregotten	Men's tournament	SUI; W 7–4	CAN; L 5–6	GBR; L 3–8	USA; W 7–6	SWE; L 4–6	DEN; L 5–6	ROC; W 12–5	CHN; L 6–8	ITA; W 9–4	6	Did not advance		
Kristin Skaslien; Magnus Nedregotten	Mixed doubles tournament	CZE; L 6–7	USA; W 11–6	CAN; L 6–7	ITA; L 8–11	AUS; W 10–4	CHN; W 9–6	SWE; W 6–2	GBR; W 6–2	SUI; W 6–5	2 Q	GBR; W 6–5	ITA; L 5–8	2nd place, silver medalist(s)

=== Men's tournament ===
Norway has qualified their men's team (five athletes), by finishing first in the round robin in the 2021 Olympic Qualification Event.

Final Round Robin Standings
Team	Skip	Pld	W	L	W–L	PF	PA	EW	EL	BE	SE	S%	DSC	Qualification
Great Britain	Bruce Mouat	9	8	1	–	63	44	39	31	5	10	88.0%	18.81	Playoffs
Sweden	Niklas Edin	9	7	2	–	64	44	43	30	10	11	85.7%	14.02	Playoffs
Canada	Brad Gushue	9	5	4	1–0	58	50	34	38	7	7	84.4%	26.49	Playoffs
United States	John Shuster	9	5	4	0–1	56	61	35	41	4	5	83.0%	32.29	Playoffs
China	Ma Xiuyue	9	4	5	2–1; 1–0	59	62	39	36	6	4	85.4%	23.55	
Norway	Steffen Walstad	9	4	5	2–1; 0–1	58	53	40	36	0	11	84.4%	20.96	
Switzerland	Peter de Cruz	9	4	5	1–2; 1–0	51	54	33	38	13	3	84.5%	15.74	
ROC	Sergey Glukhov	9	4	5	1–2; 0–1	58	58	33	38	6	6	81.2%	33.72	
Italy	Joël Retornaz	9	3	6	–	59	65	36	35	3	8	81.7%	30.76	
Denmark	Mikkel Krause	9	1	8	–	36	71	30	39	3	2	78.1%	32.84	

Round robin

Norway had a bye in draws 3, 7 and 11.

Draw 1

Wednesday, 9 February, 20:05

Sheet C	1	2	3	4	5	6	7	8	9	10	Final
Norway (Walstad)	0	1	1	0	1	1	0	0	2	1	7
Switzerland (de Cruz) 🔨	1	0	0	1	0	0	0	2	0	0	4

Draw 2

Thursday, 10 February, 14:05

Sheet B	1	2	3	4	5	6	7	8	9	10	Final
Norway (Walstad)	0	2	0	0	1	0	0	0	2	0	5
Canada (Gushue) 🔨	2	0	0	1	0	0	0	2	0	1	6

Draw 4

Friday, 11 February, 20:05

Sheet C	1	2	3	4	5	6	7	8	9	10	Final
Great Britain (Mouat) 🔨	1	0	2	2	0	3	0	X	X	X	8
Norway (Walstad)	0	1	0	0	1	0	1	X	X	X	3

Draw 5

Saturday, 12 February, 14:05

Sheet D	1	2	3	4	5	6	7	8	9	10	Final
United States (Shuster)	0	2	0	1	0	0	2	0	0	1	6
Norway (Walstad) 🔨	1	0	1	0	2	2	0	1	0	0	7

Draw 6

Sunday, 13 February, 9:05

Sheet A	1	2	3	4	5	6	7	8	9	10	Final
Norway (Walstad)	0	0	1	1	0	1	0	1	0	0	4
Sweden (Edin) 🔨	0	1	0	0	0	0	2	0	1	2	6

Draw 8

Monday, 14 February, 14:05

Sheet B	1	2	3	4	5	6	7	8	9	10	11	Final
Denmark (Krause) 🔨	1	0	0	1	1	0	1	0	1	0	1	6
Norway (Walstad)	0	1	0	0	0	2	0	1	0	1	0	5

Draw 9

Tuesday, 15 February, 9:05

Sheet A	1	2	3	4	5	6	7	8	9	10	Final
ROC (Glukhov)	0	1	0	0	2	0	2	0	0	X	5
Norway (Walstad) 🔨	3	0	1	4	0	1	0	1	2	X	12

Draw 10

Tuesday, 15 February, 20:05

Sheet C	1	2	3	4	5	6	7	8	9	10	Final
Norway (Walstad)	0	1	0	2	0	0	1	0	2	0	6
China (Ma) 🔨	1	0	2	0	0	1	0	3	0	1	8

Draw 12

Thursday, 17 February, 9:05

Sheet D	1	2	3	4	5	6	7	8	9	10	Final
Norway (Walstad)	0	0	2	0	1	0	2	2	2	X	9
Italy (Retornaz) 🔨	1	1	0	2	0	0	0	0	0	X	4

=== Mixed doubles tournament ===
Norway has qualified their mixed doubles team (two athletes), by finishing in the top seven teams in the 2021 World Mixed Doubles Curling Championship.

Final Round Robin Standings
Team	Athletes	Pld	W	L	W–L	PF	PA	EW	EL	BE	SE	S%	DSC	Qualification
Italy	Stefania Constantini / Amos Mosaner	9	9	0	–	79	48	43	28	0	17	79%	25.34	Playoffs
Norway	Kristin Skaslien / Magnus Nedregotten	9	6	3	1–0	68	50	40	28	0	15	82%	24.48	Playoffs
Great Britain	Jennifer Dodds / Bruce Mouat	9	6	3	0–1	60	50	38	33	0	12	79%	22.48	Playoffs
Sweden	Almida de Val / Oskar Eriksson	9	5	4	1–0	55	54	35	33	0	10	76%	21.77	Playoffs
Canada	Rachel Homan / John Morris	9	5	4	0–1	57	54	33	39	0	8	78%	53.73	
Czech Republic	Zuzana Paulová / Tomáš Paul	9	4	5	–	50	65	29	39	1	7	75%	33.41	
Switzerland	Jenny Perret / Martin Rios	9	3	6	1–0	55	58	32	39	0	6	73%	39.04	
United States	Vicky Persinger / Chris Plys	9	3	6	0–1	50	67	34	36	0	9	74%	27.29	
China	Fan Suyuan / Ling Zhi	9	2	7	1–0	51	64	34	36	0	7	74%	17.81	
Australia	Tahli Gill / Dean Hewitt	9	2	7	0–1	52	67	31	38	1	8	72%	50.51	

Round robin

Norway had a bye in draws 2, 6, 8 and 10.

Draw 1

Wednesday, 2 February, 20:05

Sheet C	1	2	3	4	5	6	7	8	9	Final
Norway (Skaslien / Nedregotten)	1	1	0	1	0	2	1	0	0	6
Czech Republic (Paulová / Paul) 🔨	0	0	2	0	1	0	0	3	1	7

Draw 3

Thursday, 3 February, 14:05

Sheet B	1	2	3	4	5	6	7	8	Final
United States (Persinger / Plys) 🔨	1	0	2	0	3	0	0	0	6
Norway (Skaslien / Nedregotten)	0	1	0	2	0	3	3	2	11

Draw 4

Thursday, 3 February, 20:05

Sheet A	1	2	3	4	5	6	7	8	Final
Norway (Skaslien / Nedregotten) 🔨	2	0	1	0	2	0	1	0	6
Canada (Homan / Morris)	0	4	0	1	0	1	0	1	7

Draw 5

Friday, 4 February, 8:35

Sheet D	1	2	3	4	5	6	7	8	Final
Italy (Constantini / Mosaner)	3	0	2	0	2	2	0	2	11
Norway (Skaslien / Nedregotten) 🔨	0	5	0	1	0	0	2	0	8

Draw 7

Saturday, 5 February, 9:05

Sheet C	1	2	3	4	5	6	7	8	Final
Australia (Gill / Hewitt)	0	0	1	0	3	0	X	X	4
Norway (Skaslien / Nedregotten) 🔨	4	2	0	1	0	3	X	X	10

Draw 9

Saturday, 5 February, 20:05

Sheet B	1	2	3	4	5	6	7	8	Final
Norway (Skaslien / Nedregotten)	0	2	1	1	0	5	0	X	9
China (Fan / Ling) 🔨	1	0	0	0	2	0	3	X	6

Draw 11

Sunday, 6 February, 14:05

Sheet A	1	2	3	4	5	6	7	8	Final
Norway (Skaslien / Nedregotten) 🔨	2	0	1	0	1	1	1	X	6
Sweden (de Val / Eriksson)	0	1	0	1	0	0	0	X	2

Draw 12

Sunday, 6 February, 20:05

Sheet D	1	2	3	4	5	6	7	8	Final
Norway (Skaslien / Nedregotten)	1	1	0	1	1	0	2	X	6
Great Britain (Dodds / Mouat) 🔨	0	0	1	0	0	1	0	X	2

Draw 13

Monday, 7 February, 9:05

Sheet A	1	2	3	4	5	6	7	8	Final
Switzerland (Perret / Rios) 🔨	0	0	1	0	2	0	2	0	5
Norway (Skaslien / Nedregotten)	1	1	0	1	0	2	0	1	6

Semifinal

Monday, 7 February, 20:05

Sheet A	1	2	3	4	5	6	7	8	Final
Norway (Skaslien / Nedregotten) 🔨	0	1	0	1	0	3	0	1	6
Great Britain (Dodds / Mouat)	1	0	2	0	1	0	1	0	5

Final

Tuesday, 8 February, 20:05

Sheet B	1	2	3	4	5	6	7	8	Final
Italy (Constantini / Mosaner) 🔨	0	2	1	3	0	1	0	1	8
Norway (Skaslien / Nedregotten)	2	0	0	0	1	0	2	0	5

== Freestyle skiing ==
Norway qualified 4 men and 2 women.

Freeski
Men

Athlete	Event	Qualification					Final				
Athlete	Event	Run 1	Run 2	Run 3	Best	Rank	Run 1	Run 2	Run 3	Best	Rank
Ferdinand Dahl	Big air	~~12.00~~	72.50	77.50	150.00	19	did not advance				
Ferdinand Dahl	Slopestyle	35.41	67.61	—N/a	67.61	16	Did not advance				
Tormod Frostad	Big air	90.00	81.25	~~42.00~~	171.25	7Q	25.50	~~14.00~~	33.00	58.50	12
Tormod Frostad	Slopestyle	22.11	38.05	—N/a	38.05	24	Did not advance				
Christian Nummedal	Big air	92.25	~~77.25~~	79.25	171.50	6Q	26.00	93.00	~~17.50~~	110.50	10
Christian Nummedal	Slopestyle	41.48	16.03	—N/a	41.48	22	Did not advance				
Birk Ruud	Big air	94.50	~~50.50~~	93.25	187.75	1Q	95.75	92.00	~~69.00~~	187.75	1st place, gold medalist(s)
Birk Ruud	Slopestyle	83.96	40.95	—N/a	83.96	2Q	26.98	47.93	79.33	79.33	5

Women

Athlete	Event	Qualification					Final				
Athlete	Event	Run 1	Run 2	Run 3	Best	Rank	Run 1	Run 2	Run 3	Best	Rank
Sandra Eie	Big air	77.50	~~76.25~~	84.50	162.00	4Q	~~17.00~~	~~19.00~~	64.50	64.50	12
Sandra Eie	Slopestyle	49.08	31.31	—N/a	49.08	19	did not advance				
Johanne Killi	Big air	87.50	60.75	~~58.25~~	148.25	10Q	87.75	~~58.50~~	65.50	153.25	7
Johanne Killi	Slopestyle	81.48	86.00	—N/a	86.00	2Q	24.86	73.11	71.78	73.11	6

== Nordic combined ==
Norway qualified 5 athletes.

Athlete	Event	Ski jumping			Cross-country		Total	
Athlete	Event	Distance	Points	Rank	Time	Rank	Time	Rank
Espen Andersen	Normal hill/10km	96.0	109.3	16	25:17.3	20	26:52.3	11
Espen Bjørnstad	Normal hill/10km	99.0	110.1	15	26:40.1	32	28:12.1	27
Jørgen Graabak	Normal hill/10km	98.5	114.1	9	23:52.5	2	25:08.5	2nd place, silver medalist(s)
Jens Lurås Oftebro	Normal hill/10km	92.5	103.8	20	24:53.2	11	26:50.2	10
Espen Andersen	Large hill/10km	125.0	106.9	13	26:45.2	18	28:57.2	15
Jørgen Graabak	Large hill/10km	126.5	108.0	12	25:06.3	1	27:13.3	1st place, gold medalist(s)
Jens Lurås Oftebro	Large hill/10km	127.5	113.0	10	25:26.7	2	27:13.7	2nd place, silver medalist(s)
Jarl Magnus Riiber	Large hill/10km	142.0	139.8	1	27:53.1	36	27:53.1	8
Espen Andersen; Espen Bjørnstad; Jørgen Graabak; Jens Lurås Oftebro	Team large hill/4 × 5 km	523.5	469.4	2	50:37.1	1	50:45.1	1st place, gold medalist(s)

== Ski jumping ==
Norway qualified 5 men and 3 women. Johann André Forfang was qualified and selected to the team but did not participate in any events.

Men

Athlete	Event	Qualification			First round			Final			Total	
Athlete	Event	Distance	Points	Rank	Distance	Points	Rank	Distance	Points	Rank	Points	Rank
Halvor Egner Granerud	Normal hill	90.0	87.4	28 Q	97.5	127.4	22	DSQ			127.4	30
Halvor Egner Granerud	Large hill	133.5	131.6	2 Q	135.0	132.4	9	135.5	139.0	5	271.4	8
Robert Johansson	Normal hill	103.0	116.6	2 Q	97.0	128.8	16	96.0	119.5	21	248.3	20
Robert Johansson	Large hill	127.5	115.9	17 Q	128.5	119.3	32	Did not advance				
Marius Lindvik	Normal hill	100.5	116.7	1 Q	96.5	128.4	17	102.5	132.3	3	260.7	7
Marius Lindvik	Large hill	135.0	136.4	1 Q	140.5	144.8	2	140.0	151.3	1	296.1	1st place, gold medalist(s)
Daniel-André Tande	Large hill	120.5	105.1	28 Q	128.0	120.2	31	Did not advance				
Halvor Egner Granerud; Daniel-André Tande; Robert Johansson; Marius Lindvik	Team large hill	—N/a			515.0	456.5	3	505.5	465.6	4	922.1	4

Women

Athlete	Event	First round			Final			Total	
Athlete	Event	Distance	Points	Rank	Distance	Points	Rank	Points	Rank
Thea Minyan Bjørseth	Normal hill	99.5	104.1	6 Q	73.0	59.9	29	164.0	21
Silje Opseth	Normal hill	92.5	94.7	12 Q	95.0	105.8	5	200.5	6
Anna Odine Strøm	Normal hill	91.5	91.5	16 Q	84.0	84.5	15	176.0	15

Mixed

Athlete	Event	First round			Final			Total	
Athlete	Event	Distance	Points	Rank	Distance	Points	Rank	Points	Rank
Robert Johansson; Marius Lindvik; Silje Opseth; Anna Odine Strøm	Mixed team normal hill	385.0	457.4	2 Q	201.0	250.5	8	707.9	8

== Snowboarding ==
Norway qualified 3 men and 1 women.

Men

Athlete	Event	Qualification					Final				
Athlete	Event	Run 1	Run 2	Run 3	Best	Rank	Run 1	Run 2	Run 3	Best	Rank
Marcus Kleveland	Slopestyle	37.28	64.86	—N/a	64.86	14	Did not advance				
Marcus Kleveland	Big air	87.75	63.75	~~61.25~~	151.50	6 Q	87.75	62.25	~~39.00~~	150.00	8
Mons Røisland	Slopestyle	70.96	41.41	—N/a	70.96	9 Q	29.01	63.33	52.53	63.33	7
Mons Røisland	Big air	~~31.25~~	80.00	66.50	146.50	9 Q	89.25	~~75.75~~	82.50	171.75	2nd place, silver medalist(s)
Ståle Sandbech	Slopestyle	70.11	78.61	—N/a	78.61	4 Q	29.05	27.43	39.66	39.66	11
Ståle Sandbech	Big air	69.50	~~15.50~~	66.50	136.00	16	Did not advance				

Women

Athlete	Event	Qualification					Final				
Athlete	Event	Run 1	Run 2	Run 3	Best	Rank	Run 1	Run 2	Run 3	Best	Rank
Hanne Eilertsen	Slopestyle	48.35	35.30	—N/a	48.35	16	Did not advance				
Hanne Eilertsen	Big air	39.75	17.50	~~12.75~~	57.25	27	Did not advance				

== Speed skating ==
Men

Athlete	Event	Race	
Athlete	Event	Time	Rank
Håvard Holmefjord Lorentzen	500 m	34.921	15
Bjørn Magnussen	500 m	34.96	17
Håvard Holmefjord Lorentzen	1000 m	1:08.48	3rd place, bronze medalist(s)
Bjørn Magnussen	1000 m	1:10.14	25
Allan Dahl Johansson	1000 m	1:10.34	28
Allan Dahl Johansson	1500 m	1:45.81	12
Peder Kongshaug	1500 m	1:44.39	4
Kristian Ulekleiv	1500 m	1:46.56	16
Hallgeir Engebråten	5000 m	6:09.88	3rd place, bronze medalist(s)

Women

Athlete	Event	Race	
Athlete	Event	Time	Rank
Sofie Karoline Haugen	Women's 1500 m	2:01.57	28
Ragne Wiklund	Women's 1000 m	1:16.59	18
Ragne Wiklund	Women's 1500 m	1:56.46	12
Ragne Wiklund	Women's 3000 m	4:01.44	5
Ragne Wiklund	Women's 5000 m	6:56.34	5

Mass start

Athlete	Event	Semifinals			Finals		
Athlete	Event	Points	Time	Rank	Points	Time	Rank
Peder Kongshaug	Men's	0	14 Laps	14	Did not advance		28
Kristian Ulekleiv	Men's	60	7:56.67	1 Q	0	7:48.52	14
Marit Fjellanger Bøhm	Women's	0	8:42.28	13	Did not advance		25
Sofie Karoline Haugen	Women's	0	8:33.77	12	Did not advance		23

Team Pursuit

Athlete	Event	Quarterfinal		Semifinal		Final	
Athlete	Event	Opposition Time	Rank	Opposition Time	Rank	Opposition Time	Rank
Hallgeir Engebråten; Peder Kongshaug; Sverre Lunde Pedersen	Men's	3:37.47	1 Q	Netherlands; W 3:38.28	1	Final A ROC; W 3:38.08	1st place, gold medalist(s)
Marit Fjellanger Bøhm; Sofie Karoline Haugen; Ragne Wiklund	Women's	3:01.84	6	Did not advance		Final C China; L 3:02.15	6

== See also ==
- Norway at the 2022 Winter Paralympics
