= Nordic combined at the 2022 Winter Olympics =

Nordic combined at the XXIV Olympic Winter Games
- Nordic combined pictogram
- Venue: Kuyangshu Nordic Center and Biathlon Center
- Dates: 9–17 February 2022
- No. of events: 3
- Competitors: 55 from 18 nations (55 men)

Nordic combined at the 2022 Winter Olympics was held at the Kuyangshu Nordic Center and Biathlon Center. The three events took place between 9 and 17 February 2022.

A total of 55 quota spots (all men) were distributed to the sport, the same as four years prior at the 2018 Winter Olympics. A total of three events for men were contested.

== Qualification ==
A total of 55 quota spots are available to athletes to compete at the games. A maximum of five athletes could be entered by any one National Olympic Committee. Competitors are eligible to compete if they have scored points at a World or Continental cup event during the qualification period of July 2020 to 16 January 2022. The top 55 on the Olympic quota allocation list respecting the maximum of four per country will qualify to compete.

== Competition schedule ==
The following is the competition schedule for all three events.

All times are (UTC+8).

Date	Time	Event
9 February	16:00	Men's individual normal hill
9 February	19:00	Men's individual 10 km
15 February	16:00	Men's individual large hill
15 February	18:30	Men's individual 10 km
17 February	16:00	Men's team large hill
17 February	19:00	Men's team relay 4 x 5 km

== Medal summary ==
=== Medal table ===
Rank	Nation	Gold	Silver	Bronze	Total
1	Norway	2	2	0	4
2	Germany	1	1	0	2
3	Japan	0	0	2	2
4	Austria	0	0	1	1
Totals (4 entries)		3	3	3	9

=== Medalists ===
Event	Gold		Silver		Bronze	
Individual large hill/10 km	Jørgen Graabak; Norway	27:13.3	Jens Lurås Oftebro; Norway	27:13.7	Akito Watabe; Japan	27:13.9
Individual normal hill/10 km	Vinzenz Geiger; Germany	25:07.7	Jørgen Graabak; Norway	25:08.5	Lukas Greiderer; Austria	25:14.3
Team large hill/4 x 5 km	Norway; Espen Bjørnstad; Espen Andersen; Jens Lurås Oftebro; Jørgen Graabak	50:45.1	Germany; Manuel Faißt; Julian Schmid; Eric Frenzel; Vinzenz Geiger	51:40.0	Japan; Yoshito Watabe; Hideaki Nagai; Akito Watabe; Ryota Yamamoto	51:40.3

== Participating nations ==
A total of 55 athletes (all men) from 18 nations (including the IOC's designation of ROC for the Russian Olympic Committee) qualified to participate.

The numbers in parentheses represents the number of participants entered.

- Austria (5)
- China (1)
- Czech Republic (4)
- Estonia (1)
- Finland (5)
- France (5)
- Germany (5)
- Italy (4)
- Japan (5)
- Kazakhstan (1)
- Latvia (1)
- Norway (5)
- Poland (2)
- ROC (3)
- Slovenia (1)
- South Korea (1)
- Ukraine (1)
- United States (5)
