= Julian Rauchfuß =

German alpine skier

Personal information
- Born: 2 September 1994 (age 31) Mindelheim, Bavaria, Germany
- Height: 1.71 m (5 ft 7 in)

Skiing career
- Sport: Alpine skiing
- Club: RG Burig Mindelheim
- Disciplines: Giant slalom, slalom
- World Cup debut: 22 December 2017 (age 23)

Olympics
- Teams: 1 – (2022)
- Medals: 1

World Championships
- Teams: 0
- Medals: 0 (0 gold)

World Cup
- Seasons: 5 − (2018–2022)
- Wins: 0
- Podiums: 0
- Overall titles: 0 – (129th in 2021)
- Discipline titles: 0 – (9th in PG, 2021)
Medal record
Men's alpine skiing
Representing Germany
Olympic Games
Silver medal – second place	2022 Beijing	Team event

Julian Rauchfuß (born 2 September 1994) is a German World Cup alpine ski racer, who specialises in the technical events of slalom and giant slalom.

He competed at the 2021–22 FIS Alpine Ski World Cup.
