= Kristina Reztsova =

Russian biathlete

Personal information
- Native name: Кристина Леонидовна Резцова
- Nationality: (Russia) Russian
- Born: 27 April 1996 (age 30) Moscow, Russia

Sport

Olympic Games
- Teams: 1 (2022)
- Medals: 2

World Cup
- Seasons: 2 (2019/20, 2021-22)
- Individual victories: 0
- All victories: 1
- Individual podiums: 1
- All podiums: 6
Medal record
Women's biathlon
Representing ROC
Olympic Games
Silver medal – second place	2022 Beijing	4 × 6 km relay
Bronze medal – third place	2022 Beijing	Mixed relay
Representing Russia
Youth World Championships
Silver medal – second place	2015 Minsk	3 × 6 km relay
Junior World Championships
Bronze medal – third place	2017 Osrblie	3 × 6 km relay

Kristina Leonidovna Reztsova (Russian: Кристина Леонидовна Резцова, born 27 April 1996) is a Russian biathlete. At the 2022 Winter Olympics, representing the Russia Olympic Committee, she won a bronze medal as part of the mixed relay team and a silver medal as part of the women's relay team.

She started competing in the World Cup in the 2019–20 season, but the best she achieved was an 18th position in one of the races. Reztsova missed the 2020–21 season due to the birth of her daughter. After she returned to competitions, in the 2021–22 season, Reztsova achieved her first top-10 finish in an individual World Cup race, and eventually four podium finishes. She qualified for the 2022 Winter Olympics, the first Olympics in her career, where she won two medals.

Reztsova is the second daughter of Anfisa Reztsova, an Olympic champion in cross-country skiing and biathlon. She was training separately from the Russian team, to be able to take care of her daughter, and on occasion criticized the Russian Biathlon Federation, something her mother was also known for.

Her older sister is Daria Virolaynen.

== Biathlon results ==
All results are sourced from the International Biathlon Union.

=== Olympic Games ===
2 medals (1 silver, 1 bronze)

Event	Individual	Sprint	Pursuit	Mass start	Relay	Mixed relay
(China) 2022 Beijing	9th	6th	26th	5th	Silver	Bronze

=== Biathlon World Cup ===
Season	Overall		Individual		Sprint		Pursuit		Mass start	
Season	Points	Position	Points	Position	Points	Position	Points	Position	Points	Position
2017–18	0	―	—	—	0	―	―	―	—	—
2019–20	66	58th	14	50th	22	64th	30	45th	—	—
2021–22	366	13th	34	18th	138	12th	103	14th	91	2nd
