= Biathlon at the 2022 Winter Olympics – Men's sprint =

Men’s sprint at the XXIV Olympic Winter Games
- Biathlon
- Venue: Hualindong Ski Resort
- Date: 12 February 2022
- Competitors: 94 from 28 nations
- Winning time: 24:00.4

Medalists
1st place, gold medalist(s)		Johannes Thingnes Bø	Norway
2nd place, silver medalist(s)		Quentin Fillon Maillet	France
3rd place, bronze medalist(s)		Tarjei Bø	Norway

The Men's sprint competition of the Beijing 2022 Olympics was held on 12 February, at the National Biathlon Centre, in the Zhangjiakou cluster of competition venues, 180 kilometres (110 mi) north of Beijing, at an elevation of 1,665 metres (5,463 ft). The event was won by Johannes Thingnes Bø of Norway. Quentin Fillon Maillet of France won silver, and Tarjei Bø of Norway bronze.

== Summary ==
The 2018 champion, Arnd Peiffer, retired from competitions. The silver medalist, Michal Krčmář, qualified for the Olympics. as well as the bronze medalist, Dominik Windisch. The overall leader of the 2021–22 Biathlon World Cup before the Olympics was Fillon Maillet, and the leader in the sprint was Sebastian Samuelsson, with Fillon Maillet and Émilien Jacquelin standing very close to Samuelsson.

Maxim Tsvetkov was an early leader. Johannes Thingnes Bø improved his time by 40 seconds. Then Fillon Maillet finished 25 seconds behind Bø, and Tarjei Bø took the bronze improving Tsvetkov's time by 2 seconds. Tsvetkov was also fourth in the individual.

== Results ==
The race was started at 17:00.

Rank	Bib	Name	Country	Time	Penalties (P+S)	Deficit
1st place, gold medalist(s)	16	Johannes Thingnes Bø	Norway	24:00.4	1 (0+1)	—
2nd place, silver medalist(s)	18	Quentin Fillon Maillet	France	24:25.9	1 (1+0)	+25.5
3rd place, bronze medalist(s)	27	Tarjei Bø	Norway	24:39.3	1 (0+1)	+38.9
4	9	Maxim Tsvetkov	ROC	24:41.0	0 (0+0)	+40.6
5	56	Sebastian Samuelsson	Sweden	24:52.4	1 (1+0)	+52.0
6	26	Martin Ponsiluoma	Sweden	24:54.1	2 (0+2)	+53.7
7	40	Sturla Holm Lægreid	Norway	25:02.7	2 (1+1)	+1:02.3
8	30	Benedikt Doll	Germany	25:05.4	1 (0+1)	+1:05.0
9	34	Émilien Jacquelin	France	25:06.3	2 (1+1)	+1:05.9
10	24	Anton Smolski	Belarus	25:12.9	1 (0+1)	+1:12.5
11	12	Eduard Latypov	ROC	25:14.8	3 (2+1)	+1:14.4
12	58	Christian Gow	Canada	25:15.5	0 (0+0)	+1:15.1
13	15	Dmytro Pidruchnyi	Ukraine	25:19.0	1 (0+1)	+1:18.6
14	62	Lukas Hofer	Italy	25:19.6	1 (0+1)	+1:19.2
15	60	Artem Pryma	Ukraine	25:19.8	1 (0+1)	+1:19.4
16	36	Michal Krčmář	Czech Republic	25:22.4	1 (0+1)	+1:22.0
17	42	Roman Rees	Germany	25:24.3	0 (0+0)	+1:23.9
18	21	Simon Eder	Austria	25:26.9	1 (0+1)	+1:26.5
19	48	Daniil Serokhvostov	ROC	25:38.0	2 (0+2)	+1:37.6
20	8	Vetle Sjåstad Christiansen	Norway	25:38.4	3 (2+1)	+1:38.0
21	37	Fabien Claude	France	25:41.6	3 (1+2)	+1:41.2
22	4	Philipp Nawrath	Germany	25:43.4	3 (1+2)	+1:43.0
23	92	Thomas Bormolini	Italy	25:44.1	1 (1+0)	+1:43.7
24	2	Simon Desthieux	France	25:45.0	2 (0+2)	+1:44.6
25	6	Tero Seppälä	Finland	25:47.5	3 (1+2)	+1:47.1
26	29	Jakov Fak	Slovenia	25:48.0	1 (0+1)	+1:47.6
27	88	Sebastian Stalder	Switzerland	25:48.3	0 (0+0)	+1:47.9
28	59	Mikuláš Karlík	Czech Republic	25:48.8	3 (0+3)	+1:48.4
29	83	Jules Burnotte	Canada	25:50.3	2 (2+0)	+1:49.9
30	20	Dominik Windisch	Italy	25:51.6	2 (0+2)	+1:51.2
31	3	Vladimir Iliev	Bulgaria	25:52.2	2 (0+2)	+1:51.8
32	5	Cheng Fangming	China	25:53.3	1 (0+1)	+1:52.9
33	50	Johannes Kühn	Germany	25:53.7	4 (2+2)	+1:53.3
34	31	Scott Gow	Canada	25:56.7	2 (1+1)	+1:56.3
35	79	Adam Runnalls	Canada	26:00.5	2 (1+1)	+2:00.1
36	22	Jake Brown	United States	26:04.7	2 (0+2)	+2:04.3
37	68	Niklas Hartweg	Switzerland	26:05.7	2 (1+1)	+2:05.3
38	10	Alexander Loginov	ROC	26:15.5	4 (2+2)	+2:15.1
38	11	Olli Hiidensalo	Finland	26:15.5	3 (1+2)	+2:15.1
40	61	Yan Xingyuan	China	26:16.7	1 (1+0)	+2:16.3
41	19	Tsukasa Kobonoki	Japan	26:17.8	1 (0+1)	+2:17.4
42	75	Lovro Planko	Slovenia	26:22.3	2 (0+2)	+2:21.9
43	32	Vytautas Strolia	Lithuania	26:22.4	2 (1+1)	+2:22.0
44	53	Kosuke Ozaki	Japan	26:24.1	0 (0+0)	+2:23.7
45	46	Joscha Burkhalter	Switzerland	26:28.3	2 (1+1)	+2:27.9
46	52	Felix Leitner	Austria	26:33.8	2 (1+1)	+2:33.4
47	65	Sean Doherty	United States	26:35.2	4 (1+3)	+2:34.8
48	17	Grzegorz Guzik	Poland	26:36.2	1 (0+1)	+2:35.8
49	13	Alexandr Mukhin	Kazakhstan	26:37.2	1 (1+0)	+2:36.8
50	76	Rene Zahkna	Estonia	26:37.9	1 (0+1)	+2:37.5
51	45	Raido Ränkel	Estonia	26:39.1	2 (0+2)	+2:38.7
52	69	Blagoy Todev	Bulgaria	26:39.2	1 (0+1)	+2:38.8
53	14	Benjamin Weger	Switzerland	26:39.6	1 (0+1)	+2:39.2
54	39	Heikki Laitinen	Finland	26:41.1	2 (1+1)	+2:40.7
55	44	Jesper Nelin	Sweden	26:43.6	4 (3+1)	+2:43.2
56	82	Anton Sinapov	Bulgaria	26:45.4	2 (0+2)	+2:45.0
57	51	Mikita Labastau	Belarus	26:47.0	4 (2+2)	+2:46.6
58	77	Jakub Štvrtecký	Czech Republic	26:48.3	3 (1+2)	+2:47.9
59	84	Adam Václavík	Czech Republic	26:50.2	3 (2+1)	+2:49.8
60	70	Anton Dudchenko	Ukraine	26:51.6	2 (2+0)	+2:51.2
61	74	Tommaso Giacomel	Italy	26:52.2	4 (1+3)	+2:51.8
62	38	Miha Dovžan	Slovenia	26:53.1	2 (2+0)	+2:52.7
63	57	Dimitar Gerdzhikov	Bulgaria	26:56.5	2 (1+1)	+2:56.1
64	72	Peppe Femling	Sweden	26:58.5	3 (2+1)	+2:58.1
65	43	Šimon Bartko	Slovakia	26:58.8	3 (2+1)	+2:58.4
66	81	Bogdan Tsymbal	Ukraine	26:59.0	3 (3+0)	+2:58.6
67	49	Thierry Langer	Belgium	26:59.8	1 (1+0)	+2:59.4
68	33	Michal Šíma	Slovakia	27:02.3	1 (1+0)	+3:01.9
69	80	David Komatz	Austria	27:02.5	2 (0+2)	+3:02.1
70	87	Kristo Siimer	Estonia	27:06.6	1 (1+0)	+3:06.2
71	78	Maksim Varabei	Belarus	27:10.4	4 (3+1)	+3:10.0
72	91	Patrick Jakob	Austria	27:10.9	1 (0+1)	+3:10.5
73	67	Karol Dombrovski	Lithuania	27:11.2	1 (0+1)	+3:10.8
74	54	Paul Schommer	United States	27:13.3	4 (1+3)	+3:12.9
75	25	Campbell Wright	New Zealand	27:14.1	2 (1+1)	+3:13.7
76	85	Zhang Chunyu	China	27:14.2	1 (0+1)	+3:13.8
77	55	Vladislav Kireyev	Kazakhstan	27:21.7	1 (1+0)	+3:21.3
78	23	Dzmitry Lazouski	Belarus	27:22.9	3 (0+3)	+3:22.5
79	28	Pavel Magazeev	Moldova	27:25.0	3 (2+1)	+3:24.6
80	47	Tomas Kaukėnas	Lithuania	27:27.9	2 (1+1)	+3:27.5
81	71	Zhu Zhenyu	China	27:28.6	3 (2+1)	+3:28.2
82	35	Timofey Lapshin	South Korea	27:30.8	2 (1+1)	+3:30.4
83	90	Leif Nordgren	United States	27:31.8	3 (0+3)	+3:31.4
84	7	Florent Claude	Belgium	27:35.1	4 (1+3)	+3:34.7
85	93	Matej Baloga	Slovakia	27:41.3	1 (0+1)	+3:40.9
86	86	Rok Tršan	Slovenia	27:45.7	1 (0+1)	+3:45.3
87	64	Tomáš Sklenárik	Slovakia	27:46.3	3 (1+2)	+3:45.9
88	1	Kalev Ermits	Estonia	27:46.4	4 (2+2)	+3:46.0
89	41	George Colțea	Romania	27:54.7	2 (1+1)	+3:54.3
90	89	Linas Banys	Lithuania	28:05.8	3 (1+2)	+4:05.4
91	73	Tom Lahaye-Goffart	Belgium	28:15.1	1 (1+0)	+4:14.7
92	66	Tuomas Harjula	Finland	28:21.2	2 (0+2)	+4:20.8
93	63	Maksim Makarov	Moldova	29:45.6	5 (2+3)	+5:45.2
94	94	César Beauvais	Belgium	30:06.8	4 (1+3)	+6:06.4
