= Biathlon World Championships 2021 – Men's relay =

Men's relay at the Biathlon World Championships 2021
- Location: Pokljuka, Slovenia
- Date: 20 February
- Competitors: 108 from 27 nations
- Teams: 27
- Winning time: 1:12:27.4

Medalists
gold medal	Sturla Holm Lægreid; Tarjei Bø; Johannes Thingnes Bø; Vetle Sjåstad Christiansen	Norway
silver medal	Peppe Femling; Jesper Nelin; Martin Ponsiluoma; Sebastian Samuelsson	Sweden
bronze medal	Said Karimulla Khalili; Matvey Eliseev; Alexander Loginov; Eduard Latypov	Unified Team at the Olympics

The Men's relay competition at the Biathlon World Championships 2021 was held on 20 February 2021.

== Results ==
The race was started at 15:00.

Rank	Bib	Team	Time	Penalties (P+S)	Deficit
1st place, gold medalist(s)	1	Norway Sturla Holm Lægreid; Tarjei Bø; Johannes Thingnes Bø; Vetle Sjåstad Christiansen	1:12:27.4; 18:03.3; 18:13.6; 17:37.4; 18:33.1	0+2 0+6; 0+1 0+1; 0+0 0+3; 0+1 0+0; 0+0 0+2	
2nd place, silver medalist(s)	5	Sweden Peppe Femling; Jesper Nelin; Martin Ponsiluoma; Sebastian Samuelsson	1:13:00.5; 18:51.4; 18:12.2; 18:07.6; 17:49.3	0+6 0+1; 0+3 0+0; 0+1 0+0; 0+2 0+1; 0+0 0+0	+33.1
3rd place, bronze medalist(s)	4	RBU Said Karimulla Khalili; Matvey Eliseev; Alexander Loginov; Eduard Latypov	1:13:18.3; 18:39.7; 18:08.3; 18:05.8; 18:24.5	0+2 0+3; 0+2 0+0; 0+0 0+1; 0+0 0+1; 0+0 0+1	+50.9
4	2	France Antonin Guigonnat; Quentin Fillon Maillet; Simon Desthieux; Émilien Jacquelin	1:13:29.4; 18:26.1; 18:37.6; 18:07.0; 18:18.7	0+1 1+10; 0+0 0+3; 0+1 1+3; 0+0 0+1; 0+0 0+3	+1:02.0
5	8	Ukraine Bogdan Tsymbal; Dmytro Pidruchnyi; Artem Pryma; Anton Dudchenko	1:13:40.1; 18:48.5; 17:42.6; 18:11.9; 18:57.1	0+3 0+1; 0+0 0+0; 0+0 0+0; 0+1 0+0; 0+2 0+1	+1:12.7
6	6	Italy Didier Bionaz; Lukas Hofer; Tommaso Giacomel; Dominik Windisch	1:14:02.9; 18:27.5; 18:01.8; 18:40.9; 18:52.7	0+2 2+12; 0+0 0+3; 0+2 0+3; 0+0 1+3; 0+0 1+3	+1:35.5
7	3	Germany Erik Lesser; Roman Rees; Arnd Peiffer; Benedikt Doll	1:14:10.6; 19:26.3; 18:35.2; 18:04.9; 18:04.2	0+2 0+2; 0+1 0+2; 0+0 0+0; 0+0 0+0; 0+1 0+0	+1:43.2
8	13	Slovenia Miha Dovžan; Jakov Fak; Rok Tršan; Alex Cisar	14:11.7; 18:47.2; 17:56.0; 18:31.4; 18:57.1	0+4 0+4; 0+1 0+3; 0+0 0+1; 0+1 0+0; 0+2 0+0	+1:44.3
9	14	Belarus Mikita Labastau; Anton Smolski; Maksim Varabei; Dzmitry Lazouski	1:14:52.8; 18:26.0; 18:37.0; 18:38.4; 19:11.4	0+5 0+4; 0+0 0+1; 0+3 0+0; 0+2 0+0; 0+0 0+3	+2:25.4
10	7	Austria David Komatz; Felix Leitner; Simon Eder; Julian Eberhard	1:14:58.5; 19:05.5; 18:21.4; 18:47.0; 18:44.6	0+3 1+3; 0+0 1+3; 0+0 0+0; 0+1 0+0; 0+2 0+0	+2:31.1
11	10	Switzerland Niklas Hartweg; Benjamin Weger; Jeremy Finello; Serafin Wiestner	1:15:15.7; 18:29.8; 18:21.8; 18:49.4; 19:34.7	0+2 3+7; 0+1 0+0; 0+1 0+1; 0+0 1+3; 0+0 2+3	+2:48.3
12	12	Canada Adam Runnalls; Scott Gow; Trevor Kiers; Christian Gow	1:15:31.0; 18:53.5; 18:52.1; 19:06.1; 18:39.3	0+1 0+3; 0+1 0+1; 0+0 0+0; 0+0 0+1; 0+0 0+1	+3:03.6
13	11	Czech Republic Mikuláš Karlík; Ondřej Moravec; Jakub Štvrtecký; Michal Krčmář	1:16:53.5; 18:56.0; 18:51.8; 20:09.3; 18:56.4	0+3 1+6; 0+0 0+2; 0+1 0+0; 0+2 1+3; 0+0 0+1	+4:26.1
14	24	Romania George Buta; Cornel Puchianu; Anatoly Oskin; Raul Flore	1:17:12.1; 18:36.2; 19:03.4; 20:09.7; 19:22.8	0+5 0+4; 0+0 0+1; 0+2 0+2; 0+2 0+1; 0+1 0+0	+4:44.7
15	16	United States Leif Nordgren; Jake Brown; Paul Schommer; Sean Doherty	1:17:23.0; 19:02.6; 20:00.1; 19:30.9; 18:49.4	0+4 2+8; 0+3 0+2; 0+0 2+3; 0+0 0+2; 0+1 0+1	+4:55.6
16	25	Bulgaria Dimitar Gerdzhikov; Anton Sinapov; Vladimir Iliev; Blagoy Todev	1:17:30.3; 19:13.4; 19:07.7; 19:18.3; 19:50.9	0+3 0+8; 0+0 0+2; 0+0 0+3; 0+2 0+1; 0+1 0+2	+5:02.9
17	15	Slovakia Michal Šíma; Tomáš Hasilla; Šimon Bartko; Matej Baloga	1:18:05.3; 18:56.7; 19:04.0; 20:24.4; 19:40.2	0+5 2+7; 0+0 0+1; 0+1 0+1; 0+3 2+3; 0+1 0+2	+5:37.9
18	19	Japan Mikito Tachizaki; Tsukasa Kobonoki; Kosuke Ozaki; Jin Nakajima	1:19:11.2; 19:04.3; 19:54.0; 18:59.2; 21:13.7	0+4 2+8; 0+0 0+1; 0+1 1+3; 0+1 0+1; 0+2 1+3	+6:43.8
19	9	Finland Tuomas Harjula; Tero Seppälä; Jaakko Ranta; Olli Hiidensalo	1:19:37.2; 21:56.4; 19:05.9; 19:14.4; 19:20.5	1+2 0+6; 1+2 0+0; 0+0 0+2; 0+0 0+1; 0+0 0+3	+7:09.8
20	27	Moldova Pavel Magazeev; Mihail Usov; Maksim Makarov; Andrei Usov	LAP; 19:12.5; 20:19.8; 19:43.6	1+8; 0+1 0+1; 1+3 0+3; 0+1 0+1; 0+3	
21	17	Estonia Rene Zahkna; Robert Heldna; Kalev Ermits; Raido Ränkel	LAP; 20:07.5; 19:36.2	1+3 0+0; 0+1 0+1; 0+2 0+3	
22	23	Latvia Aleksandrs Patrijuks; Edgars Mise; Roberts Slotiņš; Andrejs Rastorgujevs	LAP; 19:55.9; 20:13.8	0+1 2+3; 0+0 0+1; 0+2 0+1	
23	21	Belgium Thierry Langer; Tom Lahaye-Goffart; César Beauvais; Florent Claude	LAP; 18:33.2; 20:15.2	0+0 0+0; 0+2 0+1; 2+3 0+2	
24	20	Kazakhstan Alexandr Mukhin; Vladislav Kireyev; Sergey Sirik; Danil Beletskiy	LAP; 19:56.1; 20:00.8	0+1 0+1; 0+0 0+1; 0+1 0+1	
25	22	Poland Andrzej Nędza-Kubiniec; Grzegorz Guzik; Marcin Szwajnos; Tomasz Jakieła	LAP; 20:26.6; 20:00.3	1+3 0+2; 1+3 0+1; 0+2 0+3	
26	18	Lithuania Karol Dombrovski; Vytautas Strolia; Linas Banys; Tomas Kaukėnas	LAP; 20:33.7; 19:34.4	0+0 0+1; 0+2 0+1; 2+3	
27	26	South Korea Choi Du-jin; Kim Yong-gyu; Kim Sang-rea; Lee Su-young	LAP; 20:13.7; 20:37.0	0+1 0+0; 0+0 0+3; 0+2	
