= Biathlon at the 2022 Winter Olympics – Men's relay =

Men’s relay at the XXIV Olympic Winter Games
- Biathlon
- Venue: Hualindong Ski Resort
- Date: 15 February 2022
- Competitors: 84 from 21 nations
- Teams: 21
- Winning time: 1:19:50.2

Medalists
| 1st place, gold medalist(s) | | Sturla Holm Lægreid; Tarjei Bø; Johannes Thingnes Bø; Vetle Sjåstad Christiansen | Norway |
| 2nd place, silver medalist(s) | | Fabien Claude; Émilien Jacquelin; Simon Desthieux; Quentin Fillon Maillet | France |
| 3rd place, bronze medalist(s) | | Said Karimulla Khalili; Alexander Loginov; Maxim Tsvetkov; Eduard Latypov | ROC |

The Men's relay competition of the Beijing 2022 Olympics was held on 15 February, at the National Biathlon Centre, in the Zhangjiakou cluster of competition venues, 180 kilometres (110 mi) north of Beijing, at an elevation of 1,665 metres (5,463 ft). Norway, represented by Sturla Holm Lægreid, Tarjei Bø, Johannes Thingnes Bø and Vetle Sjåstad Christiansen, won the event to take gold ahead of France in silver with the bronze medal going to the Russian Olympic Committee team.

== Pre-Race ==
The 2018 Olympics saw Sweden take gold, with Norway and Germany taking silver and bronze respectively. At the most recent 2021 World Championships, Norway again took the gold.

On the 2021–2022 World Cup circuit, four relays were run before the Olympics across different stops: three were won by Norway, and one by Russia.

== Race ==
An exciting competition, the pre-race favorite team from Norway had a disastrous first leg from Sturla Holm Lægreid, who missed four times while shooting in the standing position, forcing a penalty lap and opening the door for the ROC, France, and Belarus squads to stake an early lead.

Throughout the second leg, the ROC continued skiing strong and shooting well, while Norway dropped all the way back to an almost unthinkable 1:40 deficit behind leader Alexander Loginov from the ROC. A tight battle emerged between Émilien Jacquelin of France and Roman Rees of Germany behind Loginov while Belarus, Italy, Canada, and Sweden fell further back and away from medal contention.

The third leg saw more of the same, as perfect shooting from Maxim Tsvetkov kept the ROC well clear of the chasing pack. Behind Tsetkov, Johannes Thingnes Bø led a strong comeback for the Norwegians, as the multi-gold medalist's 19:10.9 proved to be the fastest leg of the day, bringing the favorites Norway back into medal contention. France and Germany kept pace, reducing the race for three medals down to four likely candidates.

On the fourth and final leg, ROC's Eduard Latypov continued to lead going into the last shooting section, entering the checkpoint with a 0:50 lead over France, Germany, and Norway. However, after a disastrous shooting where he missed four out of his first five shots, Latypov left the shooting area having to ski two penalty loops, effectively handing the race back over to the chasing pack. Behind Latypov, both Vetle Sjåstad Christiansen of Norway and Quentin Fillon Maillet of France shot well, but Maillet had to reload manually while Christiansen shot clean, sending Norway off the shooting range first and on their way to their first gold medal in the event since 2010. Maillet finished strong to claim silver for France, while a heartbroken Latypov managed to hold off Germany for bronze.

== Results ==
The race was started at 14:30.

| Rank | Bib | Country | Time | Penalties (P+S) | Deficit |
|---|---|---|---|---|---|
| 1st place, gold medalist(s) | 1 | Norway; Sturla Holm Lægreid; Tarjei Bø; Johannes Thingnes Bø; Vetle Sjåstad Christiansen | 1:19:50.2; 20:21.2; 20:40.1; 19:10.9; 19:38.0 | 1+7; 0+0 1+3; 0+0 0+2; 0+2 0+0; 0+0 0+0 | — |
| 2nd place, silver medalist(s) | 3 | France; Fabien Claude; Émilien Jacquelin; Simon Desthieux; Quentin Fillon Maillet | 1:20:17.6; 19:48.7; 20:01.2; 20:20.6; 20:07.1 | 0+9; 0+2 0+0; 0+1 0+0; 0+2 0+1; 0+1 0+2 | +27.4 |
| 3rd place, bronze medalist(s) | 2 | ROC; Said Karimulla Khalili; Alexander Loginov; Maxim Tsvetkov; Eduard Latypov | 1:20:35.5; 19:40.9; 19:32.8; 20:15.5; 21:06.3 | 2+6; 0+0 0+1; 0+0 0+2; 0+0 0+0; 0+0 2+3 | +45.3 |
| 4 | 4 | Germany; Erik Lesser; Roman Rees; Benedikt Doll; Philipp Nawrath | 1:20:54.5; 20:21.8; 20:15.0; 19:36.3; 20:41.4 | 1+9; 0+0 0+3; 0+0 0+1; 0+0 0+1; 0+1 1+3 | +1:04.3 |
| 5 | 8 | Sweden; Peppe Femling; Jesper Nelin; Martin Ponsiluoma; Sebastian Samuelsson | 1:21:39.6; 20:18.5; 21:01.5; 20:05.0; 20:14.6 | 1+13; 0+1 0+3; 1+3 0+1; 0+3 0+1; 0+0 0+1 | +1:49.4 |
| 6 | 10 | Canada; Adam Runnalls; Christian Gow; Jules Burnotte; Scott Gow | 1:21:46.5; 20:33.2; 20:36.8; 20:32.6; 20:03.9 | 2+9; 0+1 1+3; 0+0 1+3; 0+2 0+0; 0+0 0+0 | +1:56.3 |
| 7 | 7 | Italy; Thomas Bormolini; Tommaso Giacomel; Lukas Hofer; Dominik Windisch | 1:21:48.8; 20:11.8; 20:14.5; 20:38.4; 20:44.1 | 2+13; 0+0 0+2; 0+0 0+3; 1+3 0+1; 0+1 1+3 | +1:58.6 |
| 8 | 5 | Belarus; Mikita Labastau; Dzmitry Lazouski; Maksim Varabei; Anton Smolski | 1:21:49.2; 19:41.8; 20:43.9; 21:13.8; 20:09.7 | 2+11; 0+2 0+1; 0+0 0+2; 0+0 2+3; 0+3 0+0 | +1:59.0 |
| 9 | 6 | Ukraine; Bogdan Tsymbal; Artem Pryma; Anton Dudchenko; Dmytro Pidruchnyi | 1:23:31.5; 20:22.9; 21:05.4; 20:49.9; 21:13.3 | 4+12; 0+1 0+1; 0+1 1+3; 0+0 1+3; 0+0 2+3 | +3:41.3 |
| 10 | 14 | Austria; David Komatz; Simon Eder; Felix Leitner; Harald Lemmerer | 1:23:31.9; 20:34.2; 20:33.2; 20:10.9; 22:13.6 | 2+8; 0+2 0+0; 0+0 0+2; 0+0 0+0; 0+1 2+3 | +3:41.7 |
| 11 | 11 | Slovenia; Miha Dovžan; Jakov Fak; Lovro Planko; Rok Tršan | 1:24:09.6; 20:23.6; 20:43.1; 21:33.7; 21:29.2 | 0+10; 0+1 0+0; 0+1 0+3; 0+2 0+1; 0+0 0+2 | +4:19.4 |
| 12 | 9 | Switzerland; Sebastian Stalder; Benjamin Weger; Niklas Hartweg; Joscha Burkhalter | 1:24:12.3; 20:58.0; 20:22.0; 20:10.0; 22:42.3 | 1+8; 0+0 0+0; 0+1 0+1; 0+0 0+0; 1+3 0+3 | +4:22.1 |
| 13 | 15 | United States; Sean Doherty; Jake Brown; Paul Schommer; Leif Nordgren | 1:25:33.0; 20:47.2; 21:11.5; 21:21.2; 22:13.1 | 3+13; 0+1 1+3; 0+0 1+3; 0+0 0+2; 1+3 0+1 | +5:42.8 |
| 14 | 17 | Lithuania; Tomas Kaukėnas; Vytautas Strolia; Karol Dombrovski; Linas Banys | 1:25:37.8; 21:10.3; 21:11.6; 21:25.9; 21:50.0 | 0+11; 0+2 0+0; 0+0 0+3; 0+0 0+1; 0+3 0+2 | +5:47.6 |
| 15 | 16 | Estonia; Rene Zahkna; Kristo Siimer; Kalev Ermits; Raido Ränkel | 1:26:03.6; 21:25.8; 22:26.7; 20:56.9; 21:14.2 | 2+12; 0+0 1+3; 0+3 1+3; 0+0 0+2; 0+1 0+0 | +6:13.4 |
| 16 | 20 | China; Cheng Fangming; Yan Xingyuan; Zhu Zhenyu; Zhang Chunyu | 1:26:27.5; 20:12.8; 22:37.5; 21:46.2; 21:51.0 | 2+11; 0+1 0+0; 0+2 2+3; 0+1 0+3; 0+1 0+0 | +6:37.3 |
| 17 | 12 | Finland; Heikki Laitinen; Tero Seppälä; Olli Hiidensalo; Tuomas Harjula | 1:26:57.7; 22:27.8; 20:34.7; 21:25.2; 22:30.0 | 4+14; 0+2 2+3; 0+0 0+2; 0+1 0+3; 0+0 2+3 | +7:07.5 |
| 18 | 18 | Bulgaria; Blagoy Todev; Vladimir Iliev; Dimitar Gerdzhikov; Anton Sinapov | 1:27:05.3; 22:27.2; 20:26.6; 21:58.4; 22:13.1 | 2+11; 0+2 0+1; 0+1 0+1; 1+3 0+0; 0+0 1+3 | +7:15.1 |
| 19 | 13 | Czech Republic; Jakub Štvrtecký; Mikuláš Karlík; Adam Václavík; Michal Krčmář | LAP; 22:55.8; 20:29.3; LAP | 1+3 1+3; 0+2 0+3; 0+0 2+3 | |
| 20 | 21 | Belgium; Florent Claude; Thierry Langer; Tom Lahaye-Goffart; César Beauvais | LAP; 21:01.7; 22:08.2; LAP | 0+0 0+2; 0+1 0+2; 0+3 0+0 | |
| 21 | 19 | Slovakia; Michal Šíma; Matej Baloga; Šimon Bartko; Tomáš Sklenárik | LAP; 21:39.2; 22:10.1; LAP | 0+0 0+2; 0+1 0+2; 2+3 0+2 | |
