= Biathlon at the 2022 Winter Olympics – Men's individual =

Men’s individual at the XXIV Olympic Winter Games
- Biathlon
- Venue: Hualindong Ski Resort
- Date: 8 February 2022
- Competitors: 92 from 28 nations
- Winning time: 48:47.4

Medalists
1st place, gold medalist(s)		Quentin Fillon Maillet	France
2nd place, silver medalist(s)		Anton Smolski	Belarus
3rd place, bronze medalist(s)		Johannes Thingnes Bø	Norway

The Men’s individual competition of the Beijing 2022 Olympics was held on 8 February, at the National Biathlon Centre, in the Zhangjiakou cluster of competition venues, 180 kilometres (110 mi) north of Beijing, at an elevation of 1,665 metres (5,463 ft). The event was won by Quentin Fillon Maillet of France, his first individual Olympic medal. Anton Smolski of Belarus won the silver medal. This was his first Olympic medal. The defending champion, Johannes Thingnes Bø of Norway, won bronze.

== Summary ==
In addition to being the defending champion, Johannes Thingnes Bø won the 2018-19, 2019–20, and 2020–21 Biathlon World Cup seasons overall, but in the 2021–22 season before the Olympics was stood fifth overall and fourth in the individual ranking. The 2018 silver medalist, Jakov Fak, qualified for the Olympics, whereas the bronze medalist, Dominik Landertinger, retired from competitions. The overall leader of the 2021-22 Biathlon World Cup before the Olympics was Fillon Maillet, and the leader in the individual was Tarjei Bø.

Maxim Tsvetkov started first, and Johannes Thingnes Bø started second. He missed one more target than Tsvetkov but was faster, overtook him at the fourth shooting, and finished three seconds ahead, which eventually cost Tsvetkov a medal. Fillon Maillet, started eleventh, was even faster and finished first. Anton Smolski, who did not miss and had the starting number 28, became the surprising silver medalist.

== Results ==
The race was started at 16:30.

Rank	Bib	Name	Country	Time	Penalties (P+S+P+S)	Deficit
1st place, gold medalist(s)	11	Quentin Fillon Maillet	France	48:47.4	2 (0+1+1+0)	
2nd place, silver medalist(s)	28	Anton Smolski	Belarus	49:02.2	0 (0+0+0+0)	+14.8
3rd place, bronze medalist(s)	2	Johannes Thingnes Bø	Norway	49:18.5	2 (1+0+0+1)	+31.1
4	1	Maxim Tsvetkov	ROC	49:22.3	1 (0+0+0+1)	+34.9
5	9	Scott Gow	Canada	49:53.0	1 (0+1+0+0)	+1:05.6
6	44	Benedikt Doll	Germany	49:54.5	2 (1+0+0+1)	+1:07.1
7	54	Roman Rees	Germany	50:09.0	1 (0+0+1+0)	+1:21.6
8	5	Tarjei Bø	Norway	50:17.0	1 (0+0+0+1)	+1:29.6
9	48	Fabien Claude	France	50:25.5	2 (1+1+0+0)	+1:38.1
10	31	Alexander Loginov	ROC	50:27.6	3 (0+1+0+2)	+1:40.2
11	47	Eduard Latypov	ROC	51:13.1	3 (0+1+1+1)	+2:25.7
12	16	Martin Ponsiluoma	Sweden	51:16.8	3 (2+0+0+1)	+2:29.4
13	23	Vetle Sjåstad Christiansen	Norway	51:21.3	3 (1+2+0+0)	+2:33.9
14	39	Dominik Windisch	Italy	51:25.6	2 (0+0+1+1)	+2:38.2
15	53	Sturla Holm Lægreid	Norway	51:28.1	3 (1+1+1+0)	+2:40.7
16	36	Felix Leitner	Austria	51:41.7	1 (1+0+0+0)	+2:54.3
17	15	Simon Desthieux	France	51:46.8	3 (1+2+0+0)	+2:59.4
18	21	Dmytro Pidruchnyi	Ukraine	51:49.3	3 (0+1+1+1)	+3:01.9
19	57	Benjamin Weger	Switzerland	52:06.9	2 (0+0+1+1)	+3:19.5
20	13	Simon Eder	Austria	52:09.4	2 (0+0+1+1)	+3:22.0
21	20	Vytautas Strolia	Lithuania	52:10.4	1 (0+0+0+1)	+3:23.0
22	32	Joscha Burkhalter	Switzerland	52:12.4	2 (0+2+0+0)	+3:25.0
23	92	Tero Seppälä	Finland	52:14.3	2 (0+2+0+0)	+3:26.9
24	37	Christian Gow	Canada	52:21.9	2 (0+0+2+0)	+3:34.5
25	40	Vladislav Kireyev	Kazakhstan	52:29.2	0 (0+0+0+0)	+3:41.8
26	3	Pavel Magazeev	Moldova	52:41.7	2 (1+1+0+0)	+3:54.3
27	35	Lukas Hofer	Italy	52:43.6	2 (0+2+0+0)	+3:56.2
28	75	Jake Brown	United States	52:45.4	2 (0+0+2+0)	+3:58.0
29	29	Jakov Fak	Slovenia	52:48.0	3 (1+1+0+1)	+4:00.6
30	33	Sebastian Samuelsson	Sweden	52:51.7	3 (1+1+1+0)	+4:04.3
31	66	Mikuláš Karlík	Czech Republic	52:56.3	3 (0+0+0+3)	+4:08.9
32	22	Campbell Wright	New Zealand	52:59.8	2 (0+1+1+0)	+4:12.4
33	90	Adam Runnalls	Canada	53:24.7	3 (1+0+0+2)	+4:37.3
34	56	Said Karimulla Khalili	ROC	53:26.5	4 (2+1+0+1)	+4:39.1
35	30	Paul Schommer	United States	53:27.6	3 (0+1+0+2)	+4:40.2
36	78	Jules Burnotte	Canada	53:32.3	3 (1+1+1+0)	+4:44.9
37	46	Artem Pryma	Ukraine	53:36.2	4 (1+2+0+1)	+4:48.8
38	45	Miha Dovžan	Slovenia	53:39.4	2 (0+0+0+2)	+4:52.0
39	49	Yan Xingyuan	China	53:40.6	3 (1+1+1+0)	+4:53.2
40	71	Peppe Femling	Sweden	53:43.6	2 (1+0+0+1)	+4:56.2
41	42	Dimitar Gerdzhikov	Bulgaria	53:54.2	2 (1+0+1+0)	+5:06.8
42	55	Sean Doherty	United States	53:55.8	4 (1+1+1+1)	+5:08.4
43	6	Michal Šíma	Slovakia	54:09.0	2 (0+1+0+1)	+5:21.6
44	34	Tsukasa Kobonoki	Japan	54:16.6	3 (1+0+1+1)	+5:29.2
45	65	David Komatz	Austria	54:24.1	3 (1+0+1+1)	+5:36.7
46	76	Lovro Planko	Slovenia	54:27.9	4 (2+1+0+1)	+5:40.5
47	73	Mikita Labastau	Belarus	54:29.7	4 (1+2+0+1)	+5:42.3
48	79	Didier Bionaz	Italy	54:44.7	3 (1+1+1+0)	+5:57.3
49	24	Grzegorz Guzik	Poland	54:47.9	3 (0+1+1+1)	+6:00.5
50	63	Anton Dudchenko	Ukraine	54:54.9	4 (1+0+1+2)	+6:07.5
51	8	Johannes Kühn	Germany	54:58.0	6 (3+2+1+0)	+6:10.6
52	12	Alexandr Mukhin	Kazakhstan	55:00.4	4 (1+1+0+2)	+6:13.0
53	80	Sebastian Stalder	Switzerland	55:12.6	3 (0+1+1+1)	+6:25.2
54	81	Rok Tršan	Slovenia	55:14.7	1 (1+0+0+0)	+6:27.3
55	91	Bogdan Tsymbal	Ukraine	55:19.0	4 (3+0+1+0)	+6:31.6
56	77	Niklas Hartweg	Switzerland	55:19.7	4 (0+2+0+2)	+6:32.3
57	88	Harald Lemmerer	Austria	55:22.7	4 (0+1+2+1)	+6:35.3
58	14	Dzmitry Lazouski	Belarus	55:26.4	4 (3+0+1+0)	+6:39.0
59	41	Michal Krčmář	Czech Republic	55:27.9	5 (0+1+3+1)	+6:40.5
60	74	Kristo Siimer	Estonia	55:32.7	3 (0+0+1+2)	+6:45.3
61	7	Vladimir Iliev	Bulgaria	55:37.5	5 (2+1+1+1)	+6:50.1
62	83	Milan Žemlička	Czech Republic	55:44.3	2 (0+1+0+1)	+6:56.9
63	67	Thomas Bormolini	Italy	55:48.6	5 (0+1+2+2)	+7:01.2
64	60	Jesper Nelin	Sweden	55:49.7	5 (0+2+0+3)	+7:02.3
65	17	Jakub Štvrtecký	Czech Republic	55:52.7	5 (0+3+0+2)	+7:05.3
66	4	Heikki Laitinen	Finland	55:52.8	5 (0+2+1+2)	+7:05.4
67	27	Erik Lesser	Germany	55:59.5	5 (0+3+0+2)	+7:12.1
68	38	Rene Zahkna	Estonia	56:06.0	3 (0+0+1+2)	+7:18.6
69	10	Cheng Fangming	China	56:07.8	6 (2+1+0+3)	+7:20.4
70	69	Tomas Kaukėnas	Lithuania	56:30.0	5 (1+0+2+2)	+7:42.6
71	43	Karol Dombrovski	Lithuania	56:30.1	4 (0+1+0+3)	+7:42.7
72	26	Émilien Jacquelin	France	56:31.4	7 (0+3+2+2)	+7:44.0
73	86	Raido Ränkel	Estonia	56:32.4	5 (0+2+1+2)	+7:45.0
74	50	Olli Hiidensalo	Finland	56:45.6	5 (0+2+0+3)	+7:58.2
75	19	Florent Claude	Belgium	57:11.2	5 (0+2+3+0)	+8:23.8
76	18	Timofey Lapshin	South Korea	57:13.0	5 (1+1+2+1)	+8:25.6
77	61	Thierry Langer	Belgium	57:18.3	5 (1+1+2+1)	+8:30.9
78	25	Kalev Ermits	Estonia	57:21.3	6 (2+2+0+2)	+8:33.9
79	84	Linas Banys	Lithuania	57:46.2	3 (1+1+0+1)	+8:58.8
80	70	Tomáš Sklenárik	Slovakia	58:08.1	5 (2+2+1+0)	+9:20.7
81	62	Tuomas Harjula	Finland	58:14.9	4 (1+2+1+0)	+9:27.5
82	52	Kosuke Ozaki	Japan	58:37.9	6 (1+0+4+1)	+9:50.5
83	85	Zhu Zhenyu	China	58:42.6	4 (1+2+1+0)	+9:55.2
84	87	Matej Baloga	Slovakia	58:47.1	4 (0+1+1+2)	+9:59.7
85	72	Anton Sinapov	Bulgaria	58:47.6	6 (2+1+1+2)	+10:00.2
86	51	Maksim Varabei	Belarus	58:59.5	8 (1+3+2+2)	+10:12.1
87	89	Leif Nordgren	United States	59:29.8	7 (2+2+1+2)	+10:42.4
88	58	Šimon Bartko	Slovakia	59:47.8	7 (2+3+1+1)	+11:00.4
89	59	George Colțea	Romania	1:01:55.5	8 (1+4+0+3)	+13:08.1
90	68	Tom Lahaye-Goffart	Belgium	1:02:26.2	7 (2+1+3+1)	+13:38.8
91	82	César Beauvais	Belgium	1:02:50.5	7 (1+1+1+4)	+14:03.1
92	64	Zhang Chunyu	China	1:07:12.2	12 (2+4+5+1)	+18:24.8
