= Biathlon World Championships 2021 – Men's individual =

Men's individual at the Biathlon World Championships 2021
- Location: Pokljuka, Slovenia
- Date: 17 February
- Competitors: 101 from 34 nations
- Winning time: 49:27.6

Medalists
gold medal	Sturla Holm Lægreid	Norway
silver medal	Arnd Peiffer	Germany
bronze medal	Johannes Dale	Norway

The Men's individual competition at the Biathlon World Championships 2021 was held on 17 February 2021.

== Results ==
The race was started at 14:30.

Rank	Bib	Name	Nationality	Penalties (P+S+P+S)	Time	Deficit
1st place, gold medalist(s)	66	Sturla Holm Lægreid	Norway	0 (0+0+0+0)	49:27.6	
2nd place, silver medalist(s)	61	Arnd Peiffer	Germany	0 (0+0+0+0)	49:44.5	+16.9
3rd place, bronze medalist(s)	21	Johannes Dale	Norway	1 (0+1+0+0)	50:08.5	+40.9
4	15	Quentin Fillon Maillet	France	2 (1+0+1+0)	50:40.5	+1:12.9
5	28	Johannes Thingnes Bø	Norway	2 (0+1+0+1)	50:41.1	+1:13.5
6	96	Said Karimulla Khalili	RBU	0 (0+0+0+0)	51:12.9	+1:45.3
7	19	Simon Eder	Austria	1 (0+1+0+0)	51:27.3	+1:59.7
8	49	Benedikt Doll	Germany	2 (1+1+0+0)	51:34.5	+2:06.9
9	75	Artem Pryma	Ukraine	1 (0+0+0+1)	51:58.8	+2:31.2
10	64	Roman Rees	Germany	1 (0+0+1+0)	51:59.2	+2:31.6
11	69	Ondřej Moravec	Czech Republic	1 (1+0+0+0)	52:00.4	+2:32.8
12	18	Vladimir Iliev	Bulgaria	1 (1+0+0+0)	52:00.9	+2:33.3
13	5	Émilien Jacquelin	France	2 (1+0+1+0)	52:14.5	+2:46.9
14	73	Felix Leitner	Austria	2 (0+1+0+1)	52:44.7	+3:17.1
15	34	Peppe Femling	Sweden	0 (0+0+0+0)	52:45.3	+3:17.7
16	81	Evgeniy Garanichev	RBU	2 (0+1+0+1)	52:58.5	+3:30.9
17	2	Jeremy Finello	Switzerland	3 (1+1+0+1)	53:02.8	+3:35.2
18	97	Andrejs Rastorgujevs	Latvia	2 (0+1+1+0)	53:06.5	+3:38.9
19	32	Lukas Hofer	Italy	4 (1+0+1+2)	53:09.6	+3:42.0
20	8	Florent Claude	Belgium	1 (0+0+0+1)	53:12.8	+3:45.2
21	30	Jakov Fak	Slovenia	3 (0+1+0+2)	53:17.4	+3:49.8
22	11	Jake Brown	United States	2 (0+0+1+1)	53:17.5	+3:49.9
23	16	Miha Dovžan	Slovenia	2 (0+1+0+1)	53:18.1	+3:50.5
24	86	Johannes Kühn	Germany	3 (0+2+0+1)	53:25.7	+3:58.1
25	25	Sebastian Samuelsson	Sweden	3 (2+1+0+0)	53:29.7	+4:02.1
26	100	Milan Žemlička	Czech Republic	0 (0+0+0+0)	53:39.8	+4:12.2
27	39	Michal Krčmář	Czech Republic	3 (0+1+1+1)	53:49.1	+4:21.5
28	23	Simon Desthieux	France	4 (1+2+1+0)	53:51.5	+4:23.9
29	46	Anton Smolski	Belarus	3 (3+0+0+0)	53:58.9	+4:31.3
30	27	Mikita Labastau	Belarus	1 (1+0+0+0)	54:01.2	+4:33.6
31	12	Alexander Loginov	RBU	3 (1+2+0+0)	54:02.6	+4:35.0
32	47	Leif Nordgren	United States	2 (1+0+0+1)	54:02.9	+4:35.3
33	50	Rene Zahkna	Estonia	1 (0+0+0+1)	54:09.7	+4:42.1
34	92	Julian Eberhard	Austria	4 (2+0+1+1)	54:13.1	+4:45.5
35	9	Martin Ponsiluoma	Sweden	4 (2+1+0+1)	54:15.6	+4:48.0
36	45	George Buta	Romania	2 (1+0+1+0)	54:20.5	+4:52.9
37	95	Tero Seppälä	Finland	4 (0+1+0+3)	54:24.0	+4:56.4
38	20	Karol Dombrovski	Lithuania	1 (1+0+0+0)	54:29.3	+5:01.7
39	68	Adam Runnalls	Canada	3 (1+1+0+1)	54:29.4	+5:01.8
40	44	Scott Gow	Canada	3 (0+1+1+1)	54:30.2	+5:02.6
41	36	Fabien Claude	France	4 (1+0+2+1)	54:31.0	+5:03.4
42	84	Rok Tršan	Slovenia	2 (0+0+1+1)	54:32.9	+5:05.3
43	70	Serafin Wiestner	Switzerland	3 (1+1+1+0)	54:36.5	+5:08.9
44	13	Artem Tyshchenko	Ukraine	1 (0+0+0+1)	54:41.3	+5:13.7
45	17	Dominik Windisch	Italy	5 (1+3+1+0)	54:45.3	+5:17.7
46	101	Anton Dudchenko	Ukraine	3 (0+2+0+1)	54:46.2	+5:18.6
47	43	Benjamin Weger	Switzerland	3 (2+1+0+0)	54:47.6	+5:20.0
48	31	Alex Cisar	Slovenia	2 (2+0+0+0)	54:57.6	+5:30.0
49	54	David Komatz	Austria	3 (0+0+2+1)	54:57.8	+5:30.2
50	60	Dimitar Gerdzhikov	Bulgaria	2 (1+1+0+0)	55:01.8	+5:34.2
51	89	Edgars Mise	Latvia	1 (0+0+0+1)	55:04.0	+5:36.4
52	71	Sean Doherty	United States	3 (0+1+0+2)	55:04.6	+5:37.0
53	80	Tomas Kaukėnas	Lithuania	3 (1+0+0+2)	55:06.7	+5:39.1
54	99	Maksim Varabei	Belarus	3 (1+2+0+0)	55:15.1	+5:47.5
55	57	Tomáš Hasilla	Slovakia	3 (0+0+0+3)	55:15.5	+5:47.9
56	67	Kosuke Ozaki	Japan	2 (0+1+0+1)	55:17.5	+5:49.9
57	10	Tsukasa Kobonoki	Japan	3 (1+0+1+1)	55:18.7	+5:51.1
58	42	Andrzej Nędza-Kubiniec	Poland	2 (0+1+1+0)	55:20.3	+5:52.7
59	76	Anton Sinapov	Bulgaria	4 (0+2+0+2)	55:25.7	+5:58.1
60	58	Didier Bionaz	Italy	4 (0+2+0+2)	55:26.2	+5:58.6
61	41	Matvey Eliseev	RBU	3 (2+1+0+0)	55:29.6	+6:02.0
62	90	Raul Flore	Romania	2 (0+1+0+1)	55:50.6	+6:23.0
63	6	Cornel Puchianu	Romania	4 (1+1+0+2)	55:58.3	+6:30.7
64	26	Michal Šíma	Slovakia	2 (2+0+0+0)	55:58.6	+6:31.0
65	63	Tuomas Harjula	Finland	4 (1+0+0+3)	56:02.2	+6:34.6
66	51	Vytautas Strolia	Lithuania	2 (0+0+2+0)	56:05.8	+6:38.2
67	56	Dmytro Pidruchnyi	Ukraine	6 (1+2+2+1)	56:07.8	+6:40.2
68	79	Sergey Bocharnikov	Belarus	3 (0+1+1+1)	56:08.2	+6:40.6
69	14	Alexandr Mukhin	Kazakhstan	3 (0+1+1+1)	56:12.3	+6:44.7
70	7	Tarjei Bø	Norway	6 (3+2+0+1)	56:34.6	+7:07.0
71	77	Tommaso Giacomel	Italy	6 (1+1+2+2)	56:49.9	+7:22.3
72	24	Grzegorz Guzik	Poland	5 (1+0+2+2)	56:55.8	+7:28.2
73	1	Christian Gow	Canada	4 (0+1+2+1)	57:06.7	+7:39.1
74	91	Paul Schommer	United States	4 (2+1+0+1)	57:06.8	+7:39.2
75	94	Martin Jäger	Switzerland	5 (1+3+0+1)	57:06.9	+7:39.3
76	72	Robert Heldna	Estonia	4 (2+2+0+0)	57:09.4	+7:41.8
77	65	Thierry Langer	Belgium	5 (2+1+1+1)	57:11.8	+7:44.2
78	52	Choi Du-jin	South Korea	1 (1+0+0+0)	57:20.8	+7:53.2
79	29	Jakub Štvrtecký	Czech Republic	5 (1+1+0+3)	57:32.7	+8:05.1
80	93	Trevor Kiers	Canada	6 (1+1+1+3)	57:39.5	+8:11.9
81	82	Danil Beletskiy	Kazakhstan	2 (0+2+0+0)	57:42.0	+8:14.4
82	48	Pavel Magazeev	Moldova	5 (1+2+1+1)	57:45.7	+8:18.1
83	3	Jesper Nelin	Sweden	7 (1+4+2+0)	57:49.3	+8:21.7
84	35	Aleksandrs Patrijuks	Latvia	5 (0+3+1+1)	57:54.4	+8:26.8
85	53	Sergey Sirik	Kazakhstan	3 (0+0+2+1)	58:49.9	+9:22.3
86	74	Matej Baloga	Slovakia	6 (1+2+2+1)	59:24.9	+9:57.3
87	33	Apostolos Angelis	Greece	6 (1+3+0+2)	59:25.1	+9:57.5
88	85	Marcin Szwajnos	Poland	6 (1+4+0+1)	59:39.4	+10:11.8
89	98	Vladimir Oryashkov	Bulgaria	4 (3+0+0+1)	59:58.5	+10:30.9
90	4	Mihail Usov	Moldova	4 (0+3+0+1)	1:00:07.4	+10:39.8
91	62	Damir Rastić	Serbia	6 (1+2+2+1)	1:00:09.7	+10:42.1
92	37	Krešimir Crnković	Croatia	8 (4+2+0+2)	1:00:30.1	+11:02.5
93	83	Lee Su-young	South Korea	4 (1+2+1+0)	1:00:39.9	+11:12.3
94	22	Kalev Ermits	Estonia	8 (3+1+3+1)	1:00:44.4	+11:16.8
95	88	Olli Hiidensalo	Finland	8 (3+3+0+2)	1:01:15.7	+11:48.1
96	59	Roberto Piqueras	Spain	5 (3+1+0+1)	1:01:24.7	+11:57.1
97	87	Tom Lahaye-Goffart	Belgium	7 (3+2+0+2)	1:01:25.4	+11:57.8
98	38	Vinny Fountain	Great Britain	6 (1+3+1+1)	1:02:03.1	+12:35.5
99	78	Nikolaos Tsourekas	Greece	6 (3+1+1+1)	1:03:13.8	+13:46.2
100	55	Soma Gyallai	Hungary	9 (3+3+2+1)	1:09:44.4	+20:16.8
	40	Stavre Jada	North Macedonia	(2+2)	Did not finish	
