= Slovakia at the 2022 Winter Olympics =

- Flag of Slovakia
- IOC code: SVK
- NOC: Slovak Olympic and Sports Committee
- Website: www.olympic.sk (in Slovak)

in Beijing, China 4–20 February 2022
- Competitors: 50 (37 men and 13 women) in 7 sports
- Flag bearers (opening): Marek Hrivík; Katarína Šimoňáková
- Flag bearer (closing): Peter Cehlárik
- Medals Ranked 21st: Gold 1 Silver 0 Bronze 1 Total 2

Winter Olympics appearances (overview)
- 1994; 1998; 2002; 2006; 2010; 2014; 2018; 2022; 2026

Other related appearances
- Czechoslovakia (1924–1992)

Slovakia competed at the 2022 Winter Olympics in Beijing, China, from 4 to 20 February 2022.

Marek Hrivík and Katarína Šimoňáková were the country's flagbearer during the opening ceremony. Meanwhile hockey player Peter Cehlárik was the flagbearer during the closing ceremony.

Petra Vlhová won the gold medal in the slalom event, becoming the first Slovak skier to achieve this feat. Slovakia men's national ice hockey team also won its first Olympic medal, claiming a bronze in the men's tournament after defeating Sweden 4–0.

== Medalists ==
The following Slovak competitors won medals at the games. In the discipline sections below, the medalists' names are bolded.

Medal	Name	Sport	Event	Date
Gold	Petra Vlhová	Alpine skiing	Women's slalom	9 February
Bronze	Slovakia men's national ice hockey team: Branislav Konrád; Patrik Rybár; Matej Tomek; Michal Čajkovský; Peter Čerešňák; Marek Ďaloga; Martin Gernát; Samuel Kňažko; Martin Marinčin; Šimon Nemec; Mislav Rosandić; Peter Cehlárik; Marko Daňo; Adrián Holešinský; Marek Hrivík; Libor Hudáček; Tomáš Jurčo; Miloš Kelemen; Michal Krištof; Kristián Pospíšil; Pavol Regenda; Miloš Roman; Juraj Slafkovský; Samuel Takáč; Peter Zuzin	Ice hockey	Men's tournament	19 February

== Competitors ==
The following is the list of number of competitors participating at the Games per sport/discipline.

Sport	Men	Women	Total
Alpine skiing	2	3	5
Biathlon	4	4	8
Bobsleigh	0	1	1
Cross-country skiing	2	3	5
Ice hockey	25	0	25
Luge	4	1	5
Snowboarding	0	1	1
Total	37	13	50

== Alpine skiing ==
Slovakia qualified two male and three female alpine skiers.

Men

Athlete	Event	Run 1		Run 2		Total	
Athlete	Event	Time	Rank	Time	Rank	Time	Rank
Adam Žampa	Slalom	57.76	32	53.25	25	1:51.01	25
Adam Žampa	Giant slalom	1:05.86	21	1:08.05	16	2:14.31	15
Andreas Žampa	Slalom	58.06	33	DNF			
Andreas Žampa	Giant slalom	1:06.15	23	1:08.16	17	2:14.31	16

Women

Athlete	Event	Run 1		Run 2		Total	
Athlete	Event	Time	Rank	Time	Rank	Time	Rank
Rebeka Jančová	Giant slalom	1:06.56	48	DNF			
Petra Vlhová	Giant slalom	59.34	13	58.81	16	1:58.15	14
Rebeka Jančová	Slalom	DNF		Did not advance			
**Petra Vlhová**	Slalom	52.89	8	52.09	1	1:44.98	1st place, gold medalist(s)
Petra Hromcová	Super-G	—N/a				1:20.11	38
Rebeka Jančová	Super-G	—N/a				1:20.18	39

Mixed

Athlete	Event	Round of 16	Quarterfinal	Semifinal	Final / BM	
Athlete	Event	Opposition Result	Opposition Result	Opposition Result	Opposition Result	Rank
Adam Žampa; Andreas Žampa; Petra Hromcová; Rebeka Jančová	Team	United States; **L** 1–3	Did not advance			12

== Biathlon ==
Men

Athlete	Event	Time	Misses	Rank
Šimon Bartko	Sprint	26:58.8	3 (2+1)	65
Šimon Bartko	Individual	59:47.8	7 (2+3+1+1)	88
Tomáš Sklenárik	Sprint	27:46.3	3 (1+2)	87
Tomáš Sklenárik	Individual	58:08.1	5 (2+2+1+0)	80
Matej Baloga	Sprint	27:41.3	1 (0+1)	85
Matej Baloga	Individual	58:47.1	4 (0+1+1+2)	84
Michal Šíma	Sprint	27:02.3	1 (1+0)	68
Michal Šíma	Individual	54:09.0	2 (0+1+0+1)	43
Šimon Bartko; Tomáš Sklenárik; Matej Baloga; Michal Šíma	Team relay	LAP		21

Women

Athlete	Event	Time	Misses	Rank
Ivona Fialková	Individual	49:54.2	6 (0+4+1+1)	46
Paulína Fialková	Individual	49:10.7	4 (0+2+1+1)	42
Henrieta Horvátová	Individual	52:16.1	3 (0+1+1+1)	68
Veronika Machyniaková	Individual	55:21.7	5 (1+2+0+2)	83
Paulína Fialková	Mass start	44:04.8	8 (0+3+1+4)	26
Ivona Fialková	Pursuit	40:06.3	7 (0+4+1+2)	36
Paulína Fialková	Pursuit	37:25.7	2 (0+2+0+0)	10
Ivona Fialková	Sprint	23:11.8	4 (1+3)	41
Paulína Fialková	Sprint	22:12.0	1 (0+1)	14
Henrieta Horvátová	Sprint	24:20.7	1 (1+0)	72
Veronika Machyniaková	Sprint	26:13.2	3 (2+1)	88
Paulína Fialková; Veronika Machyniaková; Henrieta Horvátová; Ivona Fialková	Team relay	LAP		19

Mixed

Athlete	Event	Time	Misses	Rank
Ivona Fialková; Paulína Fialková; Michal Šíma; Tomáš Sklenárik	Relay	LAP	9+13	17

== Bobsleigh ==
Athlete	Event	Run 1		Run 2		Run 3		Run 4		Total	
Athlete	Event	Time	Rank	Time	Rank	Time	Rank	Time	Rank	Time	Rank
Viktória Čerňanská	Women's monobob	1:05.75	12	1:06.41	15	1:06.62	18	1:06.47	15	4:25.25	17

== Cross-country skiing ==
Slovakia qualified two male and three female cross-country skiers.

Distance

Athlete	Event	Classical		Freestyle		Final		
Athlete	Event	Time	Rank	Time	Rank	Time	Deficit	Rank
Peter Mlynár	Men's 15 km classical	—N/a				42:49.9	+4:55.1	58
Ján Koristek	Men's 30 km skiathlon	44:06.1	51	40:54.9	32	1:25:38.7	+9:28.9	45
Ján Koristek	Men's 50 km freestyle	—N/a				1:17:26.0	+5:53.3	40
Alena Procházková	Women's 10 km classical	—N/a				33:18.2	+5:11.9	65
Barbora Klementová	Women's 10 km classical	—N/a				34:59.2	+6:52.9	77
Kristína Sivoková	Women's 10 km classical	—N/a				36:12.6	+8:06.3	81

Sprint

Athlete	Event	Qualification		Quarterfinals		Semifinals		Final	
Athlete	Event	Time	Rank	Time	Rank	Time	Rank	Time	Rank
Alena Procházková	Women's sprint	3:36.84	63	Did not advance					
Barbora Klementová	Women's sprint	3:34.87	57	Did not advance					
Kristína Sivoková	Women's sprint	3:46.25	72	Did not advance					

== Ice hockey ==
Summary

Key:

- OT – Overtime
- GWS – Match decided by penalty-shootout

Team	Event	Group stage					Qualification playoff	Quarterfinal	Semifinal	Final / BM	
Team	Event	Opposition Score	Opposition Score	Opposition Score	Opposition Score	Rank	Opposition Score	Opposition Score	Opposition Score	Opposition Score	Rank
**Slovakia men's**	Men's tournament	Finland; **L** 2–6	Sweden; **L** 1–4	Latvia; **W** 5–2	—N/a	3 **Q**	Germany; **W** 4–0	United States; **W** 3–2 GWS	Finland; **L** 0–2	Sweden; **W** 4–0	3rd place, bronze medalist(s)

Slovakia has qualified 25 male competitors to the ice hockey tournament.

=== Men's tournament ===
Slovakia men's national ice hockey team qualified by winning the final qualification tournament.

Team roster

The roster was announced on 18 January 2022.

Head coach: (Canada) Craig Ramsay

No.	Pos.	Name	Height	Weight	Birthdate	Team
5	D	Šimon Nemec	1.83 m (6 ft 0 in)	85 kg (187 lb)	15 February 2004 (aged 17)	(Slovakia) HK Nitra
12	F	Miloš Kelemen	1.88 m (6 ft 2 in)	96 kg (212 lb)	6 July 1999 (aged 22)	(Czech Republic) Mladá Boleslav
13	F	Tomáš Jurčo	1.88 m (6 ft 2 in)	85 kg (187 lb)	28 December 1992 (aged 29)	(Kazakhstan) Barys Nur-Sultan
14	D	Peter Čerešňák (**A**)	1.91 m (6 ft 3 in)	95 kg (209 lb)	26 January 1993 (aged 29)	(Czech Republic) HC Plzeň
19	F	Michal Krištof	1.75 m (5 ft 9 in)	74 kg (163 lb)	11 October 1993 (aged 28)	(Czech Republic) Kometa Brno
20	F	Juraj Slafkovský	1.92 m (6 ft 4 in)	99 kg (218 lb)	30 March 2004 (aged 17)	(Finland) HC TPS
22	D	Samuel Kňažko	1.86 m (6 ft 1 in)	87 kg (192 lb)	7 August 2002 (aged 19)	(United States) Seattle Thunderbirds
24	G	Patrik Rybár	1.90 m (6 ft 3 in)	86 kg (190 lb)	9 November 1993 (aged 28)	(Belarus) Dinamo Minsk
25	F	Peter Zuzin	1.82 m (6 ft 0 in)	81 kg (179 lb)	4 September 1990 (aged 31)	(Slovakia) HKM Zvolen
27	F	Marek Hrivík (**C**)	1.85 m (6 ft 1 in)	93 kg (205 lb)	28 August 1991 (aged 30)	(Russia) Torpedo Nizhny Novgorod
28	D	Martin Gernát	1.93 m (6 ft 4 in)	94 kg (207 lb)	11 April 1993 (aged 28)	(Switzerland) Lausanne HC
30	G	Matej Tomek	1.91 m (6 ft 3 in)	82 kg (181 lb)	24 May 1997 (aged 24)	(Czech Republic) Kometa Brno
34	F	Peter Cehlárik (**A**)	1.88 m (6 ft 2 in)	93 kg (205 lb)	2 August 1995 (aged 26)	(Russia) Avangard Omsk
40	F	Miloš Roman	1.81 m (5 ft 11 in)	87 kg (192 lb)	6 November 1999 (aged 22)	(Czech Republic) Oceláři Třinec
42	G	Branislav Konrád	1.88 m (6 ft 2 in)	88 kg (194 lb)	10 October 1987 (aged 34)	(Czech Republic) HC Olomouc
44	D	Mislav Rosandić	1.81 m (5 ft 11 in)	85 kg (187 lb)	26 January 1995 (aged 26)	(Czech Republic) Bílí Tygři Liberec
49	F	Samuel Takáč	1.84 m (6 ft 0 in)	92 kg (203 lb)	3 December 1991 (aged 30)	(Slovakia) Slovan Bratislava
52	D	Martin Marinčin	1.92 m (6 ft 4 in)	95 kg (209 lb)	18 February 1992 (aged 29)	(Czech Republic) Oceláři Třinec
56	F	Marko Daňo	1.82 m (6 ft 0 in)	96 kg (212 lb)	30 November 1994 (aged 27)	(Czech Republic) Oceláři Třinec
65	D	Michal Čajkovský	1.92 m (6 ft 4 in)	105 kg (231 lb)	6 May 1992 (aged 29)	(Russia) Sibir Novosibirsk
71	D	Marek Ďaloga	1.93 m (6 ft 4 in)	90 kg (200 lb)	10 March 1989 (aged 32)	(Czech Republic) Kometa Brno
79	F	Libor Hudáček	1.77 m (5 ft 10 in)	80 kg (180 lb)	7 September 1990 (aged 31)	(Belarus) Dinamo Minsk
87	F	Pavol Regenda	1.92 m (6 ft 4 in)	93 kg (205 lb)	7 December 1999 (aged 22)	(Slovakia) HK Dukla Michalovce
88	F	Kristián Pospíšil	1.87 m (6 ft 2 in)	88 kg (194 lb)	22 April 1996 (aged 25)	(Switzerland) HC Davos
89	F	Adrián Holešinský	1.82 m (6 ft 0 in)	85 kg (187 lb)	11 February 1996 (aged 25)	(Slovakia) HK Nitra

Group play

Pos	Team	Pld	W	OTW	OTL	L	GF	GA	GD	Pts	Qualification
1	Finland	3	2	1	0	0	13	6	+7	**8**	Quarterfinals
2	Sweden	3	2	0	1	0	10	7	+3	**7**	Quarterfinals
3	Slovakia	3	1	0	0	2	8	12	−4	**3**	Playoffs
4	Latvia	3	0	0	0	3	5	11	−6	**0**	Playoffs

Source: IIHF
Rules for classification: Preliminary round tiebreakers

February 10, 2022; 16:40 v	**Finland**	**6–2** (3–1, 1–1, 2–0)	Slovakia	Beijing National Indoor Stadium, Beijing; Attendance: 929

Game reference

Harri Säteri
Goalies
Branislav Konrád
Referees:
(United States) Stephen Reneau
(Russia) Evgenii Romasko
Linesmen:
(Switzerland) David Obwegeser
(United States) Brian Oliver

	0–1	05:33 – Slafkovský (Roman)
Manninen (Hartikainen, Pokka) – 10:17	1–1
Pesonen (Aaltonen, Filppula) (PP) – 14:22	2–1
Aaltonen (Nättinen) – 18:20	3–1
Manninen (Granlund, Lehtonen) – 29:28	4–1
	4–2	31:49 – Slafkovský (Čerešňák, Regenda)
Manninen (Hartikainen) – 40:16	5–2
Aaltonen (Ojamäki, Vatanen) (PP) – 54:57	6–2

10 min
Penalties
6 min
30
Shots
33

February 11, 2022; 16:40 v	**Sweden**	**4–1** (3–0, 0–0, 1–1)	Slovakia	Wukesong Arena, Beijing; Attendance: 653

Game reference

Magnus Hellberg
Goalies
Matej Tomek
Referees:
(Russia) Evgenii Romasko
(Germany) André Schrader
Linesmen:
(Switzerland) David Obwegeser
(United States) Brian Oliver

Nordström (Bengtsson, Friberg) – 11:22	1–0
Wallmark (Pudas, Tömmernes) (PP2) – 18:10	2–0
Friberg (Holm, Nordström) – 19:55	3–0
Klingberg (Lander, Bromé) (ENG) – 57:44	4–0
	4–1	58:18 – Slafkovský (Nemec)

12 min
Penalties
12 min
29
Shots
41

February 13, 2022; 12:10 v	**Slovakia**	**5–2** (1–1, 2–0, 2–1)	Latvia	Beijing National Indoor Stadium, Beijing; Attendance: 943

Game reference

Patrik Rybár
Goalies
Jānis Kalniņš
Referees:
(Canada) Oliver Gouin
(Sweden) Mikael Nord
Linesmen:
(Sweden) Ludvig Lundgren
(Russia) Dmitry Shishlo

Marinčin (Jurčo, Hudáček) – 11:00	1–0
	1–1	15:46 – Ķēniņš (Ābols, Krastenbergs)
Cehlárik (Hrivík, Takáč) – 26:17	2–1
Slafkovský – 31:16	3–1
	3–2	42:07 – Indrašis (Meija, Cibuļskis)
Zuzin (Kelemen, Čerešňák) – 49:21	4–2
Jurčo (ENG) – 59:59	5–2

4 min
Penalties
2 min
33
Shots
20

Playoffs

February 15, 2022; 12:10 v	**Slovakia**	**4–0** (1–0, 2–0, 1–0)	Germany	Beijing National Indoor Stadium, Beijing; Attendance: 926

Game reference

Patrik Rybár
Goalies
Mathias Niederberger
Referees:
(Sweden) Tobias Björk
(Sweden) Mikael Nord
Linesmen:
(Russia) Gleb Lazarev
(Finland) Lauri Nikulainen

Hudáček (Pospíšil, Gernát) – 11:05	1–0
Cehlárik (Gernát, Hrivík) – 27:01	2–0
Krištof (Kňažko, Čerešňák) – 28:45	3–0
Hrivík (Cehlárik, Takáč) (ENG) – 57:56	4–0

8 min
Penalties
33 min
34
Shots
21

Quarterfinals

February 16, 2022; 12:10 v	United States	**2–3 GWS** (1–1, 1–0, 0–1) (OT: 0–0) (SO: 0–1)	**Slovakia**	Beijing National Indoor Stadium, Beijing; Attendance: 1,059

Game reference

Strauss Mann
Goalies
Patrik Rybár
Referees:
(Sweden) Tobias Björk
(Russia) Roman Gofman
Linesmen:
(Canada) Dustin McCrank
(Russia) Nikita Shalagin

	0–1	11:45 – Slafkovský (Čerešňák, Regenda)
Abruzzese (Beniers, Kampfer) – 19:14	1–1
Hentges (Perbix, Smith) – 28:56	2–1
	2–2	59:16 – Hrivík (Čajkovský, Hudáček) (EA)

Brisson (miss)
Farrell (miss)
Knies (miss)
Smith (miss)
Miele (miss)
Shootout
(miss) Hudáček
(miss) Čajkovský
(miss) Krištof
Cehlárik
2 min
Penalties
10 min
35
Shots
37

Semifinals

February 18, 2022; 12:10 v	**Finland**	**2–0** (1–0, 0–0, 1–0)	Slovakia	Beijing National Indoor Stadium, Beijing; Attendance: 1,071

Game reference
Harri Säteri	Goalies	Patrik Rybár	Referees: (Sweden) Tobias Björk (Russia) Yevgeni Romasko; Linesmen: (Russia) Gleb Lazarev (Canada) Dustin McCrank
Manninen (Lindbohm, Vatanen) – 15:58 / 1–0; Pesonen (Hartikainen, Pokka) (ENG) – 59:21 / 2–0			Referees: (Sweden) Tobias Björk (Russia) Yevgeni Romasko; Linesmen: (Russia) Gleb Lazarev (Canada) Dustin McCrank
0 min	Penalties	6 min	Referees: (Sweden) Tobias Björk (Russia) Yevgeni Romasko; Linesmen: (Russia) Gleb Lazarev (Canada) Dustin McCrank
27	Shots	28	Referees: (Sweden) Tobias Björk (Russia) Yevgeni Romasko; Linesmen: (Russia) Gleb Lazarev (Canada) Dustin McCrank

Bronze medal game

February 19, 2022; 21:10 v	Sweden	**0–4** (0–0, 0–2, 0–2)	**Slovakia**	Beijing National Indoor Stadium, Beijing; Attendance: 1,229

Game reference

Lars Johansson
Goalies
Patrik Rybár
Referees:
(Canada) Oliver Gouin
(Russia) Evgenii Romasko
Linesmen:
(Russia) Gleb Lazarev
(Russia) Nikita Shalagin

0–1	23:17 – Slafkovský (Čerešňák)
0–2	32:47 – Takáč (Regenda) (PP)
0–3	58:26 – Slafkovský (Cehlárik) (ENG)
0–4	58:46 – Regenda (ENG)

6 min
Penalties
4 min
28
Shots
43

== Luge ==
Athlete	Event	Run 1		Run 2		Run 3		Run 4		Total	
Athlete	Event	Time	Rank	Time	Rank	Time	Rank	Time	Rank	Time	Rank
Jozef Ninis	Men's singles	58.205	18	58.764	19	58.856	23	Did not advance		2:55.825	21
Marián Skupek	Men's singles	58.956	26	58.976	23	59.051	27	Did not advance		2:56.983	26
Tomáš Vaverčák; Matej Zmij	Men's doubles	1:00.138	15	59.704	13	—N/a				1:59.842	13
Katarína Šimoňáková	Women's singles	1:00.124	27	59.851	24	59.761	26	Did not advance		2:59.736	25

Mixed

Athlete	Event	Run 1		Run 2		Run 3		Total	
Athlete	Event	Time	Rank	Time	Rank	Time	Rank	Time	Rank
Katarína Šimoňáková; Jozef Ninis; Tomáš Vaverčák / Matej Zmij	Team relay	1:01.579	11	1:02.338	8	DNF			

== Snowboarding ==
Freestyle

Athlete	Event	Qualification					Final				
Athlete	Event	Run 1	Run 2	Run 3	Best	Rank	Run 1	Run 2	Run 3	Best	Rank
Klaudia Medlová	Women's big air	62.25	51.00	~~29.75~~	113.25	16	Did not advance				
Klaudia Medlová	Women's slopestyle	DNS					Did not advance				
