= Biathlon at the 2022 Winter Olympics – Men's pursuit =

Men’s pursuit at the XXIV Olympic Winter Games
- Biathlon
- Venue: Hualindong Ski Resort
- Date: 13 February 2022
- Competitors: 59 from 22 nations
- Winning time: 39:07.5

Medalists
1st place, gold medalist(s)		Quentin Fillon Maillet	France
2nd place, silver medalist(s)		Tarjei Bø	Norway
3rd place, bronze medalist(s)		Eduard Latypov	ROC

The Men's pursuit competition of the Beijing 2022 Olympics was held on 13 February, at the National Biathlon Centre, in the Zhangjiakou cluster of competition venues, 180 kilometres (110 mi) north of Beijing, at an elevation of 1,665 metres (5,463 ft). Quentin Fillon Maillet of France won the event. Tarjei Bø of Norway won the silver medal, and Eduard Latypov, representing the Russian Olympic Committee, won bronze, his first individual Olympic medal.

== Summary ==
The 2014 and 2018 champion, Martin Fourcade, retired from competitions. The silver medalist, Sebastian Samuelsson, qualified for the Olympics, as well as the bronze medalist, Benedikt Doll. The overall leader of the 2021–22 Biathlon World Cup before the Olympics was Fillon Maillet, who was also the leader in the pursuit. Samuelsson was standing second in the pursuit ranking.

Both Johannes Thingnes Bø and Fillon Maillet, who started first and second respectively, did not miss targets in the first shooting, and Bø was faster than Fillon Maillet. On the second shooting, Bø missed two targets and Fillon Maillet did not miss, and the advantage of Bø dropped to 13 seconds. Latypov was third 35 seconds behind Bø. In the third shooting, Johannes Thingnes Bø missed three more targets, whereas Fillon Maillet and Latypov did not miss. Fillon Maillet was leading, 10 seconds ahead of Latypov, 40 seconds ahead of Tarjei Bø and Lukas Hofer, and 55 seconds ahead of Johannes Thingnes Bø. Latypov caught up with Fillon Maillet, but missed a target on the last shooting. Fillon Maillet, Tarjei Bø, and Hofer did not miss. As a result, after the shooting Fillon Maillet was leading with an advantage of about 40 seconds over the three. Johannes Thingnes Bø was 1:35 behind Fillon Maillet, and other athletes out of medal contention. The advantage was sufficient for Fillon Maillet to win gold. Tarjei Bø was second, and Latypov third.

== Results ==
The race was started at 18:45.

Rank	Bib	Name	Country	Start	Time	Penalties (P+P+S+S)	Deficit
1st place, gold medalist(s)	2	Quentin Fillon Maillet	France	0:26	39:07.5	0 (0+0+0+0)	
2nd place, silver medalist(s)	3	Tarjei Bø	Norway	0:39	39:36.1	1 (1+0+0+0)	+28.6
3rd place, bronze medalist(s)	11	Eduard Latypov	ROC	1:14	39:42.8	1 (0+0+0+1)	+35.3
4	14	Lukas Hofer	Italy	1:19	39:58.6	0 (0+0+0+0)	+51.1
5	1	Johannes Thingnes Bø	Norway	0:00	41:21.2	7 (0+2+3+2)	+2:13.7
6	17	Roman Rees	Germany	1:24	41:37.7	1 (0+0+1+0)	+2:30.2
7	24	Simon Desthieux	France	1:45	41:54.7	3 (2+0+0+1)	+2:47.2
8	5	Sebastian Samuelsson	Sweden	0:52	42:10.2	5 (1+2+2+0)	+3:02.7
9	9	Émilien Jacquelin	France	1:06	42:13.7	6 (2+3+0+1)	+3:06.2
10	46	Felix Leitner	Austria	2:33	42:16.3	1 (0+1+0+0)	+3:08.8
11	6	Martin Ponsiluoma	Sweden	0:54	42:27.0	9 (2+3+4+0)	+3:19.5
12	33	Johannes Kühn	Germany	1:53	42:37.3	4 (0+2+1+1)	+3:29.8
13	13	Dmytro Pidruchnyi	Ukraine	1:19	42:45.9	5 (1+2+2+0)	+3:38.4
14	10	Anton Smolski	Belarus	1:13	42:48.2	6 (1+1+3+1)	+3:40.7
15	20	Vetle Sjåstad Christiansen	Norway	1:38	42:53.3	3 (0+1+0+2)	+3:45.8
16	21	Fabien Claude	France	1:41	42:54.5	7 (3+1+1+2)	+3:47.0
17	4	Maxim Tsvetkov	ROC	0:41	42:56.2	6 (2+3+0+1)	+3:48.7
18	15	Artem Pryma	Ukraine	1:19	42:59.8	6 (2+2+2+0)	+3:52.3
19	22	Philipp Nawrath	Germany	1:43	43:06.7	7 (1+2+1+3)	+3:59.2
20	34	Scott Gow	Canada	1:56	43:18.7	4 (0+2+0+2)	+4:11.2
21	25	Tero Seppälä	Finland	1:47	43:30.2	7 (1+1+2+3)	+4:22.7
22	32	Cheng Fangming	China	1:53	43:30.4	4 (1+2+1+0)	+4:22.9
23	60	Anton Dudchenko	Ukraine	2:51	43:36.5	3 (2+0+1+0)	+4:29.0
24	7	Sturla Holm Lægreid	Norway	1:02	43:40.5	10 (3+2+4+1)	+4:33.0
25	31	Vladimir Iliev	Bulgaria	1:52	43:41.3	7 (2+2+2+1)	+4:33.8
26	30	Dominik Windisch	Italy	1:51	43:41.9	7 (1+1+3+2)	+4:34.4
27	38	Alexander Loginov	ROC	2:15	43:44.1	5 (0+1+3+1)	+4:36.6
28	29	Jules Burnotte	Canada	1:50	43:48.2	5 (1+2+1+1)	+4:40.7
29	26	Jakov Fak	Slovenia	1:48	43:58.9	5 (1+2+1+1)	+4:51.4
30	35	Adam Runnalls	Canada	2:00	43:59.9	5 (1+0+2+2)	+4:52.4
31	55	Jesper Nelin	Sweden	2:43	44:02.3	4 (1+0+1+2)	+4:54.8
32	8	Benedikt Doll	Germany	1:05	44:03.1	7 (2+0+2+3)	+4:55.6
33	23	Thomas Bormolini	Italy	1:44	44:04.5	6 (0+1+1+4)	+4:57.0
34	16	Michal Krčmář	Czech Republic	1:22	44:06.9	7 (1+0+4+2)	+4:59.4
35	12	Christian Gow	Canada	1:15	44:10.5	5 (0+2+0+3)	+5:03.0
36	27	Sebastian Stalder	Switzerland	1:48	44:10.7	4 (1+0+2+1)	+5:03.2
37	18	Simon Eder	Austria	1:27	44:18.7	5 (0+2+2+1)	+5:11.2
38	37	Niklas Hartweg	Switzerland	2:05	44:34.7	5 (1+3+0+1)	+5:27.2
39	19	Daniil Serokhvostov	ROC	1:38	44:34.8	8 (4+2+1+1)	+5:27.3
40	36	Jake Brown	United States	2:04	45:14.1	6 (3+1+2+0)	+6:06.6
41	40	Yan Xingyuan	China	2:16	45:30.2	5 (2+1+1+1)	+6:22.7
42	28	Mikuláš Karlík	Czech Republic	1:48	45:38.8	8 (1+3+3+1)	+6:31.3
43	47	Sean Doherty	United States	2:35	45:38.8	7 (1+1+3+2)	+6:31.3
44	59	Adam Václavík	Czech Republic	2:50	45:41.2	6 (1+1+3+1)	+6:33.7
45	57	Mikita Labastau	Belarus	2:47	45:42.0	6 (3+0+1+2)	+6:34.5
46	41	Tsukasa Kobonoki	Japan	2:17	46:16.0	5 (1+1+2+1)	+7:08.5
47	51	Raido Ränkel	Estonia	2:39	46:23.1	6 (1+1+2+2)	+7:15.6
48	58	Jakub Štvrtecký	Czech Republic	2:48	46:32.1	7 (0+3+3+1)	+7:24.6
49	54	Heikki Laitinen	Finland	2:41	46:47.2	6 (1+1+1+3)	+7:39.7
50	50	Rene Zahkna	Estonia	2:38	46:54.0	3 (0+0+2+1)	+7:46.5
51	44	Kosuke Ozaki	Japan	2:24	46:56.6	4 (0+2+0+2)	+7:49.1
52	39	Olli Hiidensalo	Finland	2:15	47:04.9	8 (5+0+1+2)	+7:57.4
53	52	Blagoy Todev	Bulgaria	2:39	47:05.0	6 (1+3+1+1)	+7:57.5
54	48	Grzegorz Guzik	Poland	2:36	47:07.0	8 (2+3+1+2)	+7:59.5
55	56	Anton Sinapov	Bulgaria	2:45	47:08.3	7 (2+0+3+2)	+8:00.8
56	42	Lovro Planko	Slovenia	2:22	47:31.6	8 (2+2+2+2)	+8:24.1
57	49	Alexandr Mukhin	Kazakhstan	2:37	47:45.0	8 (3+1+2+2)	+8:37.5
58	43	Vytautas Strolia	Lithuania	2:22	48:47.8	10 (2+3+1+4)	+9:40.3
	45	Joscha Burkhalter	Switzerland	2:28	LAP	(1+4+4+)	
	53	Benjamin Weger	Switzerland	2:39	Did not start		
