= Bulgaria at the 2022 Winter Olympics =

- IOC code: BUL
- NOC: Bulgarian Olympic Committee
- Website: www.bgolympic.org (in Bulgarian and English)

in Beijing, China 4–20 February 2022
- Competitors: 15 (9 men and 6 women) in 6 sports
- Flag bearers (opening): Maria Zdravkova; Radoslav Yankov
- Flag bearer (closing): Volunteer
- Medals: Gold 0 Silver 0 Bronze 0 Total 0

Winter Olympics appearances (overview)
- 1936; 1948; 1952; 1956; 1960; 1964; 1968; 1972; 1976; 1980; 1984; 1988; 1992; 1994; 1998; 2002; 2006; 2010; 2014; 2018; 2022; 2026

Bulgaria competed at the 2022 Winter Olympics in Beijing, China, from 4 to 20 February 2022.

The Bulgarian delegation consisted of ten men and six women competing in six sports. Biathlete Maria Zdravkova and snowboarder Radoslav Yankov were named as co-flagbearers for the team at the opening ceremony. Originally biathlete Milena Todorova was scheduled to be flagbearer at the opening ceremony, but for was replaced by Zdravkova as Todorova was scheduled to compete in the mixed relay the following day. A volunteer served as the flagbearer during the closing ceremony.

== Competitors ==
The following is a list of the number of competitors who participated at the Games per sport/discipline.

Sport	Men	Women	Total
Alpine skiing	2	1	3
Biathlon	4	4	8
Figure skating	0	1	1
Luge	1	0	1
Ski jumping	1	0	1
Snowboarding	1	0	1
Total	9	6	15

== Alpine skiing ==
Bulgaria qualified 2 men and 1 female competitors.

Athlete	Event	Run 1		Run 2		Total	
Athlete	Event	Time	Rank	Time	Rank	Time	Rank
Albert Popov	Men's slalom	54.62	9	50.53	8	1:45.15	9
Albert Popov	Men's giant slalom	1:07.60	27	1:07.34	7	2:14.94	17
Kamen Zlatkov	Men's slalom	55.66	20	DNF			
Eva Vukadinova	Women's slalom	1:00.71	49	DNF			
Eva Vukadinova	Women's giant slalom	1:05.58	44	1:05.88	37	2:11.46	36

== Biathlon ==
Bulgaria qualified a team of 4 men and 4 women.

Men

Athlete	Event	Time	Misses	Rank
Dimitar Gerdzhikov	Sprint	26:56.5	2 (1+1)	63
Dimitar Gerdzhikov	Individual	53:54.2	2 (1+0+1+0)	41
Vladimir Iliev	Sprint	25:52.2	2 (0+2)	31
Vladimir Iliev	Pursuit	43:41.3	7 (2+2+2+1)	25
Vladimir Iliev	Individual	55:37.5	5 (2+1+1+1)	61
Anton Sinapov	Sprint	26:45.4	2 (0+2)	56
Anton Sinapov	Pursuit	47:08.3	7 (2+0+3+2)	55
Anton Sinapov	Individual	58:47.6	6 (2+1+1+2)	85
Blagoy Todev	Sprint	26:39.2	1 (0+1)	52
Blagoy Todev	Pursuit	47:05.0	6 (1+3+1+1)	53
Dimitar Gerdzhikov; Vladimir Iliev; Anton Sinapov; Blagoy Todev	Team relay	1:27:05.3	13 (2+11)	18

Women

Athlete	Event	Time	Misses	Rank
Lora Hristova	Sprint	26:27.7	4 (3+1)	89
Daniela Kadeva	Sprint	24:33.1	1 (1+0)	84
Daniela Kadeva	Individual	59:30.4	8 (4+1+2+1)	86
Milena Todorova	Sprint	22:15.4	1 (1+0)	17
Milena Todorova	Pursuit	39:20.6	6 (0+0+2+4)	31
Milena Todorova	Individual	50:14.9	5 (0+2+0+3)	52
Maria Zdravkova	Sprint	24:39.1	1 (0+1)	78
Maria Zdravkova	Individual	50:13.1	1 (0+1+0+0)	50
Lora Hristova; Daniela Kadeva; Milena Todorova; Maria Zdravkova	Team relay	LAP	8 (1+7)	18

Mixed

Athlete	Event	Time	Misses	Rank
Vladimir Iliev; Dimitar Gerdzhikov; Milena Todorova; Maria Zdravkova	Team relay	LAP	12 (3+9)	19

== Figure skating ==
In the 2021 World Figure Skating Championships in Stockholm, Sweden, Bulgaria secured one quota in the ladies singles competition.

Athlete	Event	SP		FS		Total	
Athlete	Event	Points	Rank	Points	Rank	Points	Rank
Alexandra Feigin	Women's	59.16	23 Q	100.15	24	159.31	24

== Luge ==
Based on the results during the 2021–22 Luge World Cup season, Bulgaria qualified 1 sled in the men's singles.

Athlete	Event	Run 1		Run 2		Run 3		Run 4		Total	
Athlete	Event	Time	Rank	Time	Rank	Time	Rank	Time	Rank	Time	Rank
Pavel Angelov	Men's singles	59.555	29	59.753	29	59.545	29	Did not advance		2:58.853	28

== Ski jumping ==
Bulgaria qualified 1 male athlete.

Athlete	Event	Qualification			First round			Final			Total	
Athlete	Event	Distance	Points	Rank	Distance	Points	Rank	Distance	Points	Rank	Points	Rank
Vladimir Zografski	Men's normal hill	97.5	99.7	13 Q	99.0	126.7	24 Q	97.0	118.6	23	245.3	22
Vladimir Zografski	Men's large hill	117.0	95.6	37 Q	125.0	112.5	38	Did not advance				

== Snowboarding ==
Bulgaria qualified 1 male athlete.

Athlete	Event	Qualification		Round of 16	Quarterfinal	Semifinal	Final	
Athlete	Event	Time	Rank	Opposition Time	Opposition Time	Opposition Time	Opposition Time	Rank
Radoslav Yankov	Men's giant slalom	1:22.48	15 Q	Karl (AUT); L +0.36	Did not advance			15

== Non-competing sports ==
=== Cross-country skiing ===
By meeting the basic qualification standards Bulgaria qualified one male cross-country skier. The Bulgarian Olympic Committee had nominated Simeon Deyanov, but was ruled out of the Olympics after testing positive for COVID-19.
