= Cheng Fangming =

Chinese biathlete (born 1994)

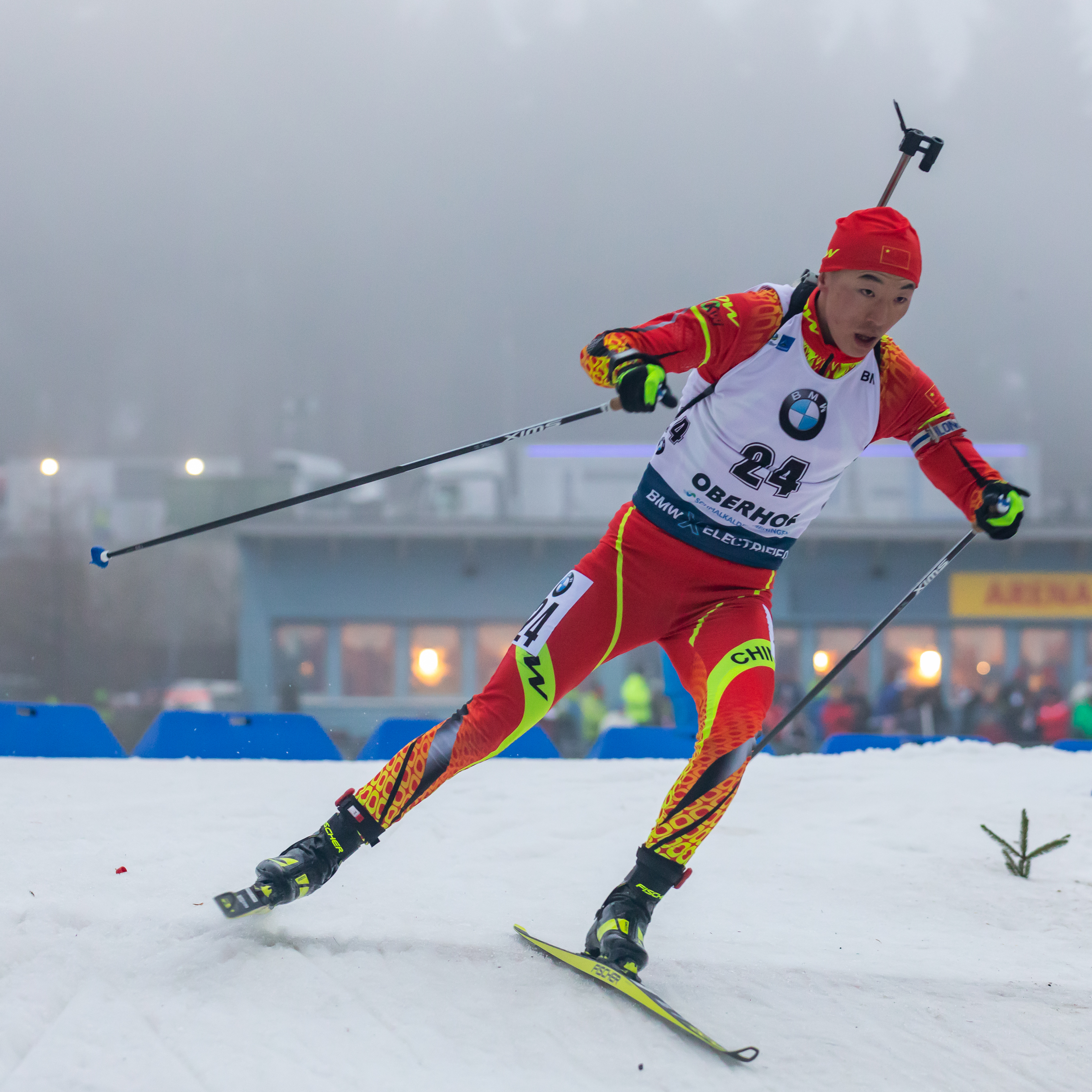
- Cheng in 2020

Personal information
- Nationality: China
- Born: 28 March 1994 (age 32) Shangzhi, China

Sport
- Sport: Biathlon
- Club: Zhujiabian
Medal record
Men's biathlon
Representing China
Youth Olympic Games
Gold medal – first place	2012 Innsbruck	Sprint
Bronze medal – third place	2012 Innsbruck	Pursuit

Cheng Fangming (born 28 March 1994) is a Chinese biathlete. He competed in the 2022 Winter Olympics.

== Career ==
Cheng started biathlon in 2011. Cheng won two medals at the 2012 Winter Youth Olympics in the sprint and pursuit events. He was banned for two years in 2016 for doping, taking the diuretic medication hydrochlorothiazide. He competed in multiple biathlon events at the 2022 Winter Olympics. He was part of the Chinese team in the mixed relay, placing 15th out of 20 teams. He placed 69th in the individual event, 32nd in the sprint, 22nd in the pursuit, and 16th with the Chinese team in the men's relay.

== Biathlon results ==
All results are sourced from the International Biathlon Union.

=== Olympic Games ===
0 medals

Event	Individual	Sprint	Pursuit	Mass start	Relay	Mixed relay
(China) 2022 Beijing	69th	32nd	22nd	30th	16th	15th

=== World Championships ===
0 medals

Event	Individual	Sprint	Pursuit	Mass start	Relay	Mixed relay	Single mixed relay
(Italy) 2020 Rasen-Antholz	56th	66th	—	—	18th	—	21st

*During Olympic seasons competitions are only held for those events not included in the Olympic program.
