= Rebeka Jančová =

Slovak alpine skier (born 2003)

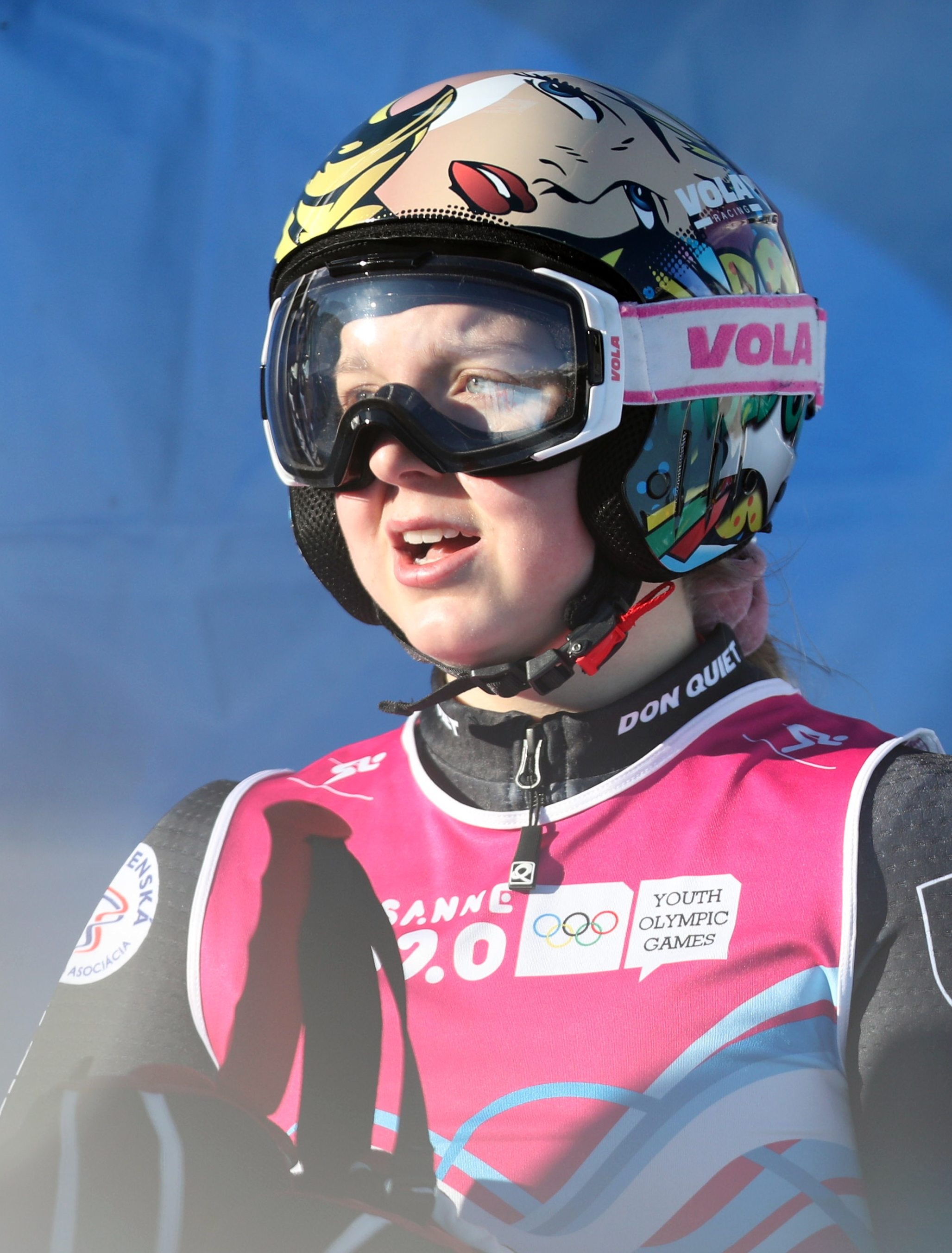
- Jančová at the 2020 Winter Youth Olympics

Personal information
- Born: 25 August 2003 (age 22) Zvolen, Slovakia
- Height: 1.6 m (5 ft 3 in)

Skiing career
- Country: Slovakia
- Sport: Alpine skiing
- Club: Vojenské športové centrum Dukla Banská Bystrica
- Disciplines: Slalom, giant slalom, super-G, combined
- World Cup debut: 14 January 2023 (age 19)

Olympics
- Teams: 2 – (2022, 2026)
- Medals: 0

World Championships
- Teams: 2 – (2023–2025)
- Medals: 0

World Cup
- Seasons: 4 – (2023–2026)

Rebeka Jančová (born 25 August 2003) is a Slovak alpine ski racer. She competed at the 2022 Winter Olympics in Beijing.

Rebeka Jančová was born on 25 August 2003 in Zvolen. She initially became interested in skiing because of her older sister Tereza Jančová. In 2012, at the age of 9, she joined the Levoča ski Club, which has been a part of Veronika Velez-Zuzulová academy since 2018. She is also a member of the Dukla Banská Bystrica athletic club.

== Career ==
Rebeka Jančová started competing internationally at the 2020 Winter Youth Olympics in Lausanne. She finished 4th in combined, 8th in super-G and 14th and 15th in giant slalom and slalom respectively.

At the age of 18, she qualified for the 2022 Winter Olympics in Beijing. She finished 12th in mixed team race together with Petra Hromcová, Adam Žampa and Andreas Žampa after losing 1 to 3 to the team USA. Additionally, she finished 39th in Women's Super-G. She did not finish either slalom or giant slalom race.

Jančová made her senior debut at the 2022–23 FIS Alpine Ski World Cup on 14 January 2023 at the age of 19.

== World Championships results ==
Year
Year	Age	Slalom	Giant slalom	Super-G	Downhill	Combined	Team combined	Parallel	Team event
2023	19	—	32	—	—	—	—N/a	—	14
2025	21	—	32	—	—	—N/a	—	—N/a	—

== Olympic results ==
Year
Year	Age	Slalom	Giant slalom	Super-G	Downhill	Combined	Team combined	Team event
2022	18	DNF1	DNF2	39	—	—	—N/a	12
2026	22	—	DNF1	21	—	—N/a	—	—N/a
