= Sebastian Stalder =

Swiss biathlete (born 1998)

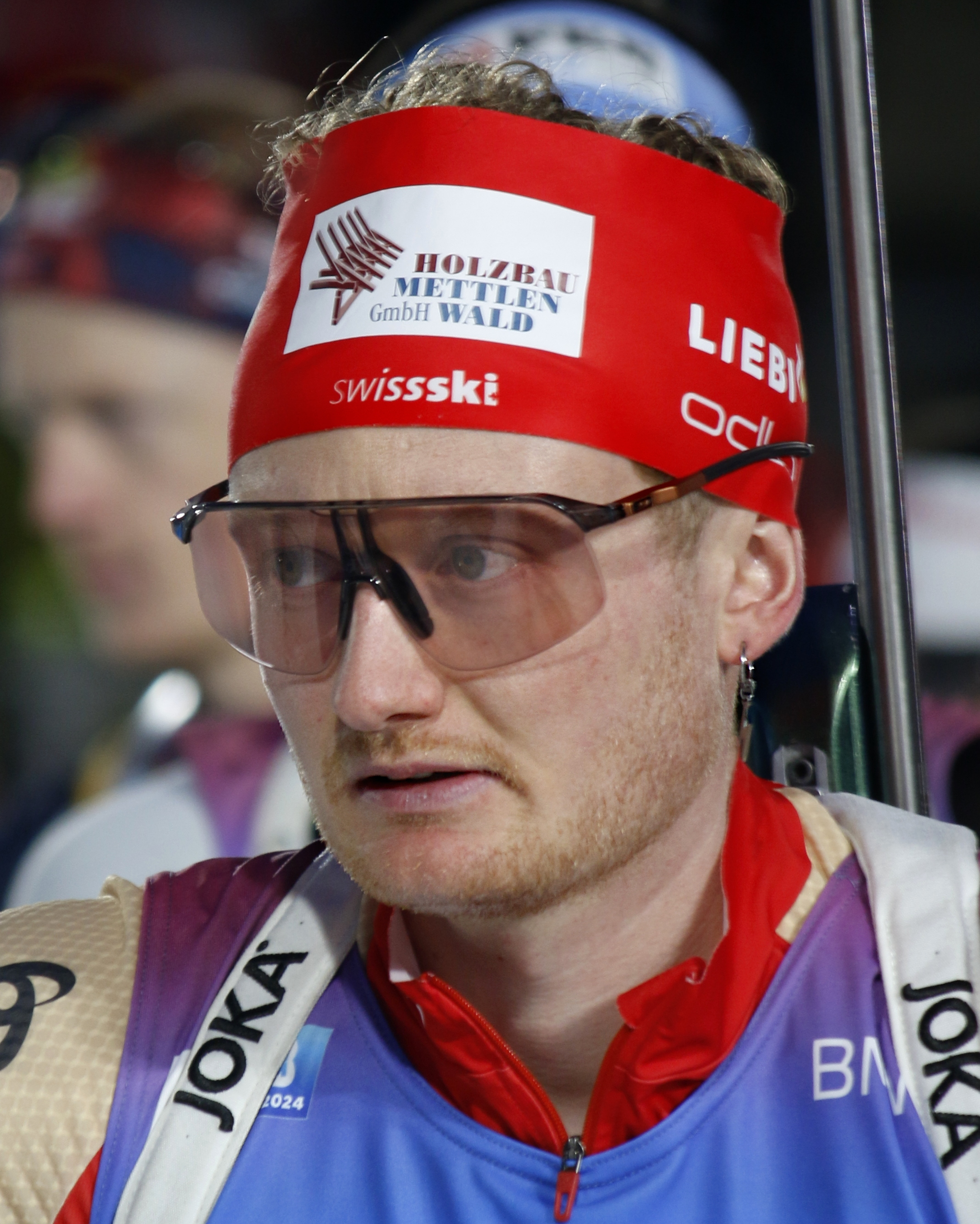
- Sebastian Stalder in 2024

Personal information
- Nationality: Swiss
- Born: 19 January 1998 (age 28) Wald, Switzerland

Sport
- Sport: Biathlon
- Club: Skiclub am Bachtel
Medal record
Men's biathlon
Representing Switzerland
Junior World Championships
Bronze medal – third place	2020 Lenzerheide	15 km individual

Sebastian Stalder (born 19 January 1998) is a Swiss biathlete. He competed in the 2022 Winter Olympics.

== Career ==
Stalder started biathlon in 2012. He won a bronze medal at 2020 Junior World Championships. He competed in multiple biathlon events at the 2022 Winter Olympics. He was part of the Swiss team in the mixed relay, placing 8th out of 20 teams. He placed 53rd in the individual event, 27th in the sprint, and 36th in the pursuit.

== Personal life ==
Stalder has a younger brother, Gion, and a younger sister, Selina, who also compete in biathlon. Stalder also competes in crossbow shooting.

== Career results ==
=== Olympic Games ===
0 medals

Event	Individual	Sprint	Pursuit	Mass start	Relay	Mixed relay
(China) 2022 Beijing	53rd	27th	36th	—	12th	8th
(Italy) 2026 Milano Cortina	60th	15th	26th	13th	8th	10th

=== World Championships ===
0 medals

Event	Individual	Sprint	Pursuit	Mass start	Relay	Mixed relay	Single mixed relay
(Germany) 2023 Oberhof	16th	37th	DNS	7th	6th	7th	—
(Czech Republic) 2024 Nové Město na Moravě	28th	50th	42nd	7th	14th	4th	—
(Switzerland) 2025 Lenzerheide	11th	13th	27th	25th	7th	6th	—
