= Eduard Latypov =

Russian biathlete

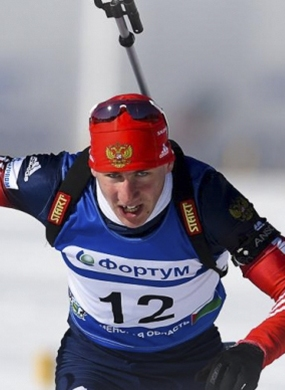
- Latypov in 2019

Personal information
- Nationality: (Russia) Russian
- Born: 21 March 1994 (age 32) Grodno, Belarus

Sport

Professional information
- Sport: Biathlon
- Club: CSKA Moscow
- World Cup debut: 6 December 2018

Olympic Games
- Teams: 1 (2022)
- Medals: 3

World Championships
- Teams: 2 (2020–2021)
- Medals: 1 (0 gold)

World Cup
- Seasons: 4 (2018/19–)
- Individual victories: 0
- All victories: 1
- Individual podiums: 3
- All podiums: 10
Medal record
Men's biathlon
Representing ROC
Olympic Games
Bronze medal – third place	2022 Beijing	12.5 km pursuit
Bronze medal – third place	2022 Beijing	Mixed relay
Bronze medal – third place	2022 Beijing	4 × 7.5 km relay
Representing Russian Biathlon Union
World Championships
Bronze medal – third place	2021 Pokljuka	4 × 7.5 km relay
Representing Russia
European Championships
Silver medal – second place	2020 Raubichi	Mixed relay
Winter Universiade
Gold medal – first place	2019 Krasnoyarsk	10 km sprint
Silver medal – second place	2019 Krasnoyarsk	20 km individual
Bronze medal – third place	2019 Krasnoyarsk	12.5 km pursuit
Junior World Championships
Gold medal – first place	2015 Raubichi	12.5 km pursuit
Gold medal – first place	2015 Raubichi	4 × 7.5 km relay
Bronze medal – third place	2014 Presque Isle	10 km sprint
Bronze medal – third place	2014 Presque Isle	4 × 7.5 km relay

Eduard Latypov (Russian: Эдуард Ратмилевич Латыпов, Tatar: Эдуард Ратмил улы Латыйпов; born 21 March 1994) is a Russian biathlete. He has competed in the Biathlon World Cup since 2018, and represented Russia at the Biathlon World Championships 2020 and Biathlon World Championships 2021.

Latypov is a member of the Central Sports Club of the Russian Army and a contract officer with the rank of lieutenant in the Russian Armed Forces. He has also received military awards from the Defense Minister, Sergei Shoigu, while appearing with his medals from the 2022 Beijing games in uniform.

== Biathlon results ==
All results are sourced from the International Biathlon Union.

=== Olympic Games ===
3 medals (3 bronze)

Event	Individual	Sprint	Pursuit	Mass start	Relay	Mixed relay
(China) 2022 Beijing	11th	11th	Bronze	19th	Bronze	Bronze

=== World Championships ===
1 medal (1 bronze)

Event	Individual	Sprint	Pursuit	Mass start	Relay	Mixed relay	Single mixed relay
(Italy) 2020 Antholz-Anterselva	43rd	—	—	—	—	—	—
(Slovenia) 2021 Pokljuka	—	10th	7th	14th	Bronze	9th	11th
