= Thierry Langer =

Belgian biathlete (born 1991)

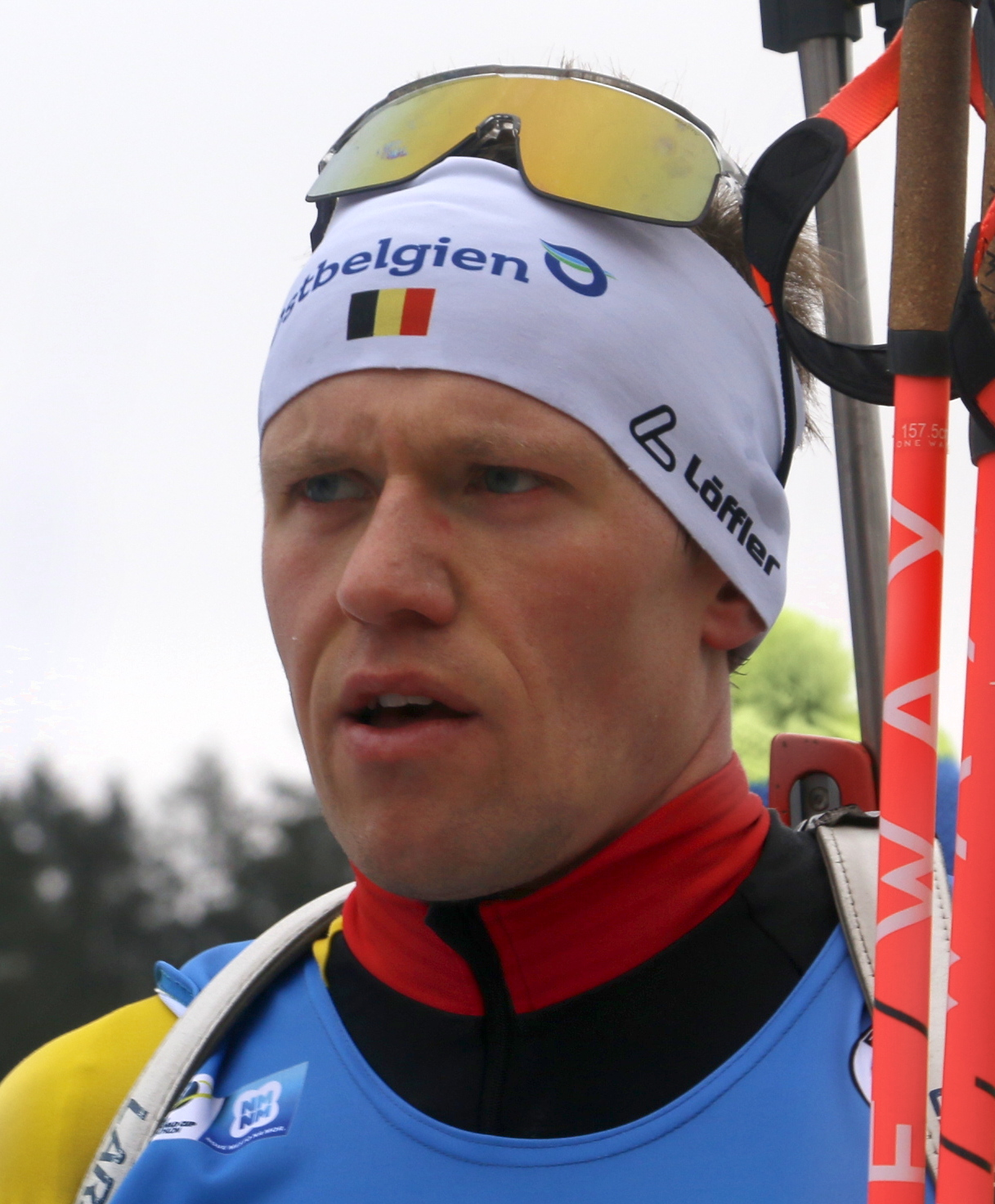
- Thierry Langer in 2023

Personal information
- Nationality: Belgian
- Born: 24 October 1991 (age 34) Malmedy, Belgium

Sport
- Sport: Biathlon

Thierry Langer (born 24 October 1991) is a Belgian biathlete. He competed in the men's 15 kilometre freestyle at the 2018 Winter Olympics. At the 2022 Winter Olympics, Belgium qualified and fielded for the first time ever a team in the men's biathlon, and Langer competed in the men's individual, sprint and men's relay competitions. Four years later, at the 2026 Winter Olympics, Belgium qualified and fielded a full men's and women's biathlon team for the first time in its winter sports history, and Langer competed in the men's individual and sprint, the men's relay and the mixed relay. He achieved a career best result in the World Cup with a 9th place in the 15 km short individual competition in Kontiolahti in the 2024–25 season.

== Biathlon results ==
All results are sourced from the International Biathlon Union.

=== Olympic Games ===
0 medals

Event	Individual	Sprint	Pursuit	Mass start	Relay	Mixed relay
(China) 2022 Beijing	77th	67th	—	—	20th	—
(Italy) 2026 Milano Cortina	52nd	85th	—	—	19th	18th

=== World Championships ===
0 medals

Event	Individual	Sprint	Pursuit	Mass start	Relay	Mixed relay	Single Mixed relay
(Austria) 2017 Hochfilzen	77th	90th	—	—	—	—	—
(Sweden) 2019 Östersund	88th	89th	—	—	23rd	—	—
(Italy) 2020 Rasen-Antholz	38th	75th	—	—	19th	25th	—
(Slovenia) 2021 Pokljuka	76th	58th	43rd	—	22nd	21st	—
(Germany) 2023 Oberhof	54th	56th	34th	—	19th	14th	—
(Czech Republic) 2024 Nové Město na Moravě	—	DNF	—	—	—	8th	—
(Switzerland) 2025 Lenzerheide	13th	42nd	46th	—	14th	10th	—

*During Olympic seasons competitions are only held for those events not included in the Olympic program.
**The single mixed relay was added as an event in 2019.
