= Mikuláš Karlík =

Czech biathlete (born 1999)

Personal information
- Nationality: Czech Republic
- Born: 17 May 1999 (age 27) Ústí nad Orlicí, Czech Republic

Sport
- Sport: Biathlon
- Club: Biatlon Letohrad
Medal record
Men's biathlon
Representing Czech Republic
Junior World Championships
Silver medal – second place	2021 Obertilliach	10 km sprint
Bronze medal – third place	2021 Obertilliach	4x7.5 km relay
Youth World Championships
Silver medal – second place	2018 Otepää	3x7.5 km relay

Mikuláš Karlík (born 17 May 1999) is a Czech biathlete. He competed in the 2022 Winter Olympics.

== Career ==
Karlík started biathlon in 2010. He was a successful biathlete as a junior, winning three medals at the Biathlon Junior World Championships. He competed in multiple biathlon events at the 2022 Winter Olympics. He was part of the Czech team in the mixed relay, placing 12th out of 20 teams. He placed 31st in the individual event, 28th in the sprint, and 42nd in the pursuit.

== Biathlon results ==
All results are sourced from the International Biathlon Union.

=== Olympic Games ===
0 medals

Event	Individual	Sprint	Pursuit	Mass start	Relay	Mixed relay
(China) 2022 Beijing	31st	28th	42nd		19th	12th
(Italy) 2026 Milano Cortina	68th	45th	35th	-	-	-
