= Tomáš Sklenárik =

Slovak biathlete (born 1999)

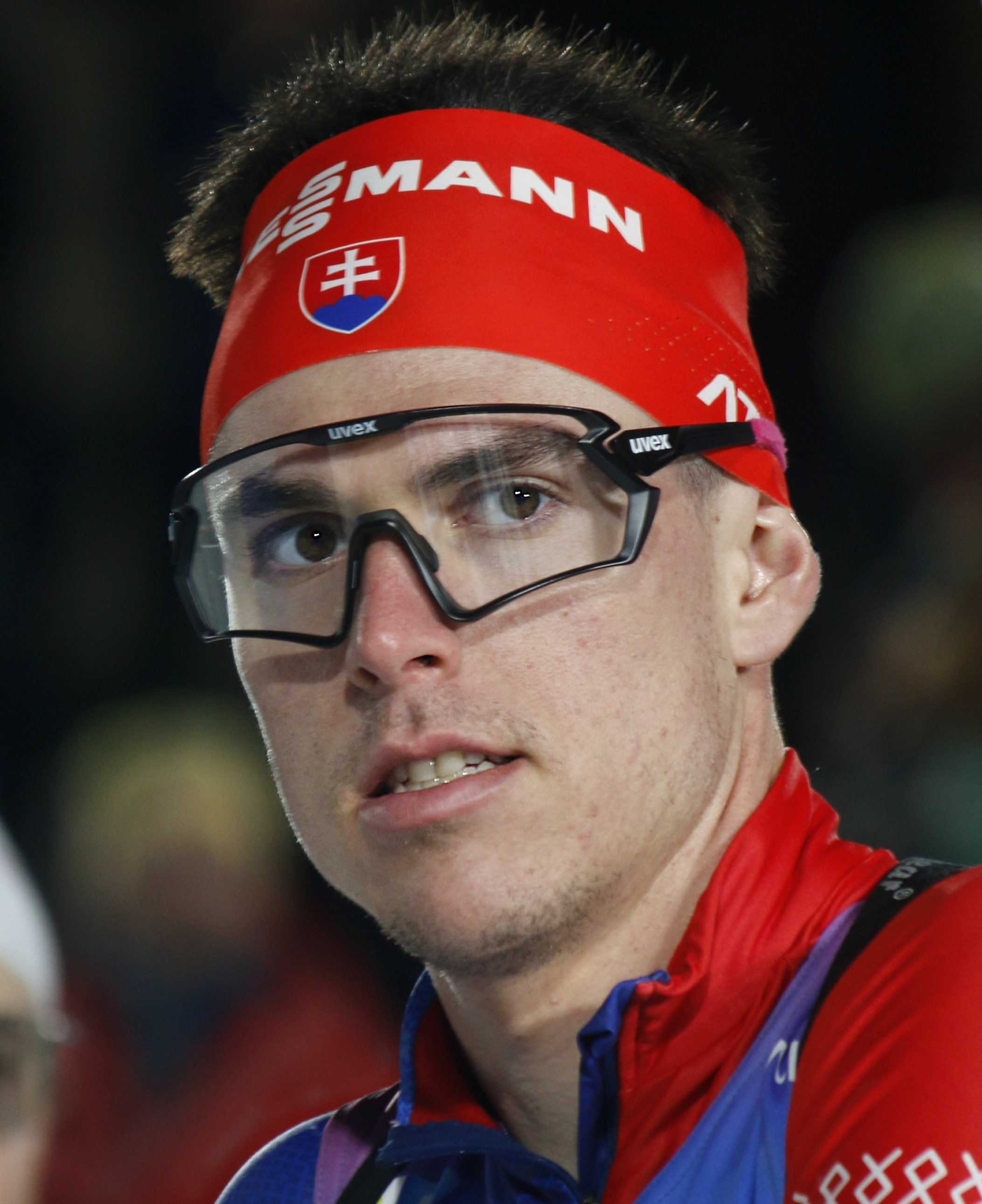
- Sklenarik in 2024

Personal information
- Nationality: Slovakia
- Born: 13 October 1999 (age 26) Revúca, Slovakia
- Height: 185 cm (6 ft 1 in)

Sport
- Sport: Biathlon
- Club: UMB Biathlon Team Banska Bystrica

Tomáš Sklenárik (born 13 October 1999) is a Slovak biathlete. He competed in the 2022 Winter Olympics.

== Biathlon results ==
All results are sourced from the International Biathlon Union.

=== Olympic Games ===
0 medals

Event	Individual	Sprint	Pursuit	Mass start	Relay	Mixed relay
(China) 2022 Beijing	80th	87th	—	—	21st	—

=== World Championships ===
0 medals

Event	Individual	Sprint	Pursuit	Mass start	Relay	Mixed relay	Single Mixed relay
(Czech Republic) 2024 Nové Město na Moravě	66th	72nd	—	—	23rd	16th	22nd
(Switzerland) 2025 Lenzerheide	58th	91st	—	—	21st	12th	—

*During Olympic seasons competitions are only held for those events not included in the Olympic program.
