= Anton Smolski =

Belarusian biathlete (born 1996)

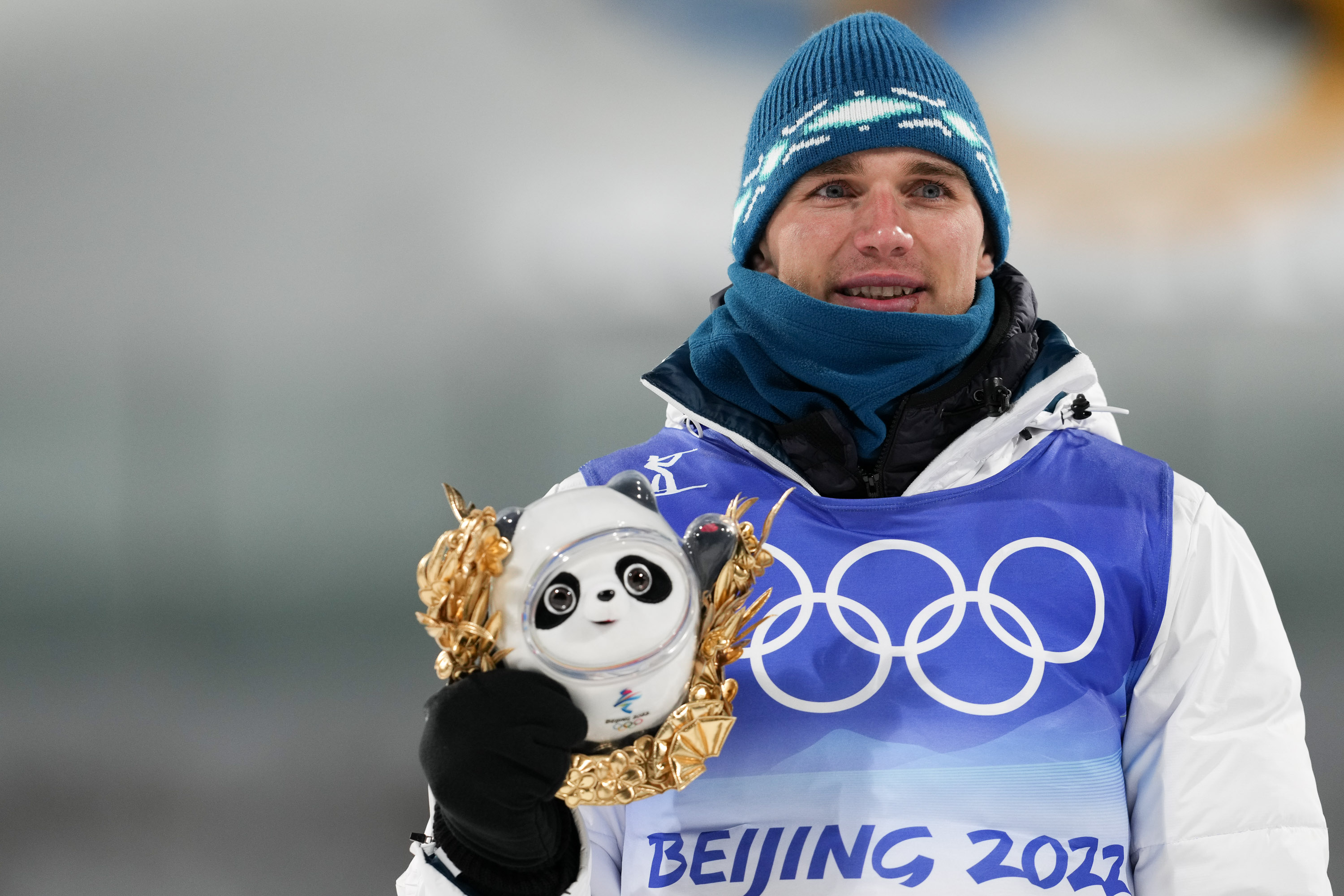

Personal information
- Nationality: Belarusian
- Born: 16 December 1996 (age 29) Piasočnaje, Kapyl District, Belarus

Sport
- Sport: Biathlon
Medal record
Men's biathlon
Representing Belarus
Olympic Games
Silver medal – second place	2022 Beijing	20 km individual
Junior World Championships
Bronze medal – third place	2017 Osrblie	12.5 km Pursuit

Anton Andrejevič Smolski (Belarusian: Антон Андрэевіч Смольскі; born 16 December 1996) is a Belarusian biathlete. He competed in both the 2018 and 2022 Winter Olympics, winning silver in the latter.

== Biathlon results ==
All results are sourced from the International Biathlon Union.

=== Olympic Games ===
1 medal (1 silver)

Event	Individual	Sprint	Pursuit	Mass start	Relay	Mixed relay
(South Korea) 2018 Pyeongchang	—	35th	33rd	—	8th	—
(China) 2022 Beijing	Silver	10th	14th	17th	8th	6th

=== World Championships ===
0 medals

Event	Individual	Sprint	Pursuit	Mass start	Relay	Mixed relay	Single Mixed relay
(Sweden) 2019 Östersund	58th	77th	—	—	10th	13th	—
(Italy) 2020 Rasen-Antholz	34th	15th	38th	—	9th	12th	—
(Slovenia) 2021 Pokljuka	28th	32nd	33rd	—	9th	14th	—

*During Olympic seasons competitions are only held for those events not included in the Olympic program.
