= Šimon Bartko =

Slovak biathlete

Personal information
- Nationality: Slovak
- Born: 11 July 1996 (age 28); Prešov, Slovakia

Sport
- Sport: Biathlon

Šimon Bartko (born 11 July 1996) is a Slovak biathlete. He competed in the 2018 Winter Olympics.

== Biathlon results ==
All results are sourced from the International Biathlon Union.

=== Olympic Games ===
0 medals

| Event | Individual | Sprint | Pursuit | Mass start | Relay | Mixed relay |
|---|---|---|---|---|---|---|
| (South Korea) 2018 Pyeongchang | — | 74th | — | — | 18th | — |
| (China) 2022 Beijing | 88th | 65th | — | — | 21st | — |

=== World Championships ===
0 medals

| Event | Individual | Sprint | Pursuit | Mass start | Relay | Mixed relay | Single Mixed relay |
|---|---|---|---|---|---|---|---|
| (Italy) 2020 Antholz | 67th | 43rd | 57th | | 17th | | |
| (Slovenia) 2021 Pokljuka | — | 79th | — | — | 17th | — | — |

*During Olympic seasons competitions are only held for those events not included in the Olympic program.
