= Kalev Ermits =

Estonian biathlete and cross-country skier (born 1992)

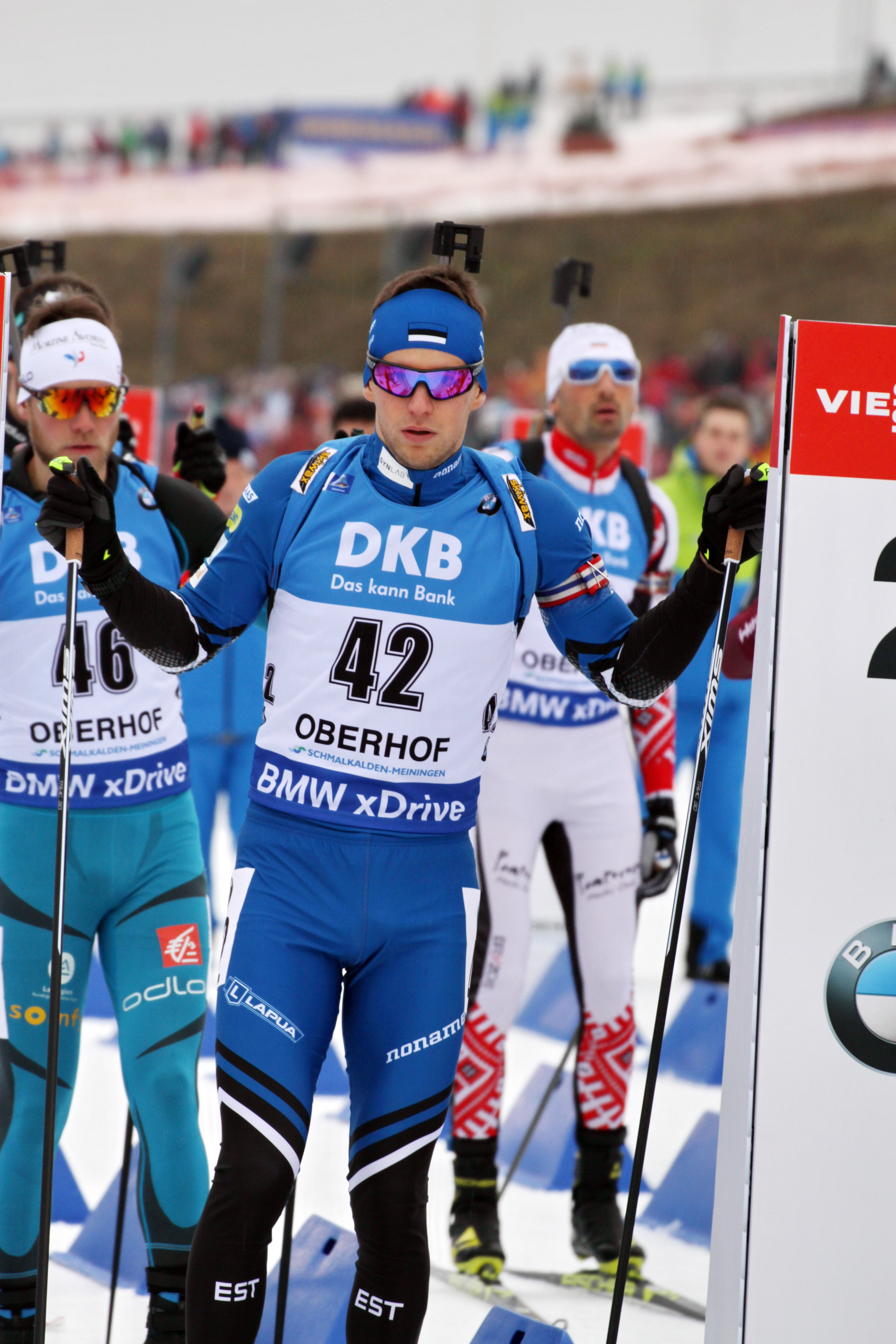
- Ermits at IBU Biathlon World Cup Oberhof 2018

Personal information
- Full name: Kalev Ermits
- Born: 19 September 1992 (age 33) Tartu, Estonia

Sport

Professional information
- Sport: Biathlon
- Club: Elva Skiclub
- World Cup debut: 4 January 2013

Olympic Games
- Teams: 3 (2014), (2018), (2022)
- Medals: 0

World Championships
- Teams: 6 (2015), (2016), (2019), (2020), (2021)
- Medals: 0

World Cup
- Seasons: (2012/13–2021-22)
- All victories: 0
- All podiums: 0
- Updated on 8 January 2022

Kalev Ermits (born 19 September 1992) is an Estonian former biathlete and cross-country skier.

He competed for Estonia at the 2014 Winter Olympics in Sochi, the 2018 Winter Olympics in Pyeongchang, and the 2022 Winter Olympics in Beijing.

He retired from Biathlon following the 2021-2022 season. After this he ran a half-marathon and began racing in cross-country skiing and was second in the 15 km freestyle race at the Estonian National Championships.

In May 2022 he married Estonian biathlete Regina Oja.

== Biathlon results ==
All results are sourced from the International Biathlon Union.

=== Winter Olympics ===
0 medals

Event	Individual	Sprint	Pursuit	Mass start	Relay	Mixed relay
(Russia) 2014 Sochi	70th	-	-	-	-	-
(South Korea) 2018 Pyeongchang	32nd	36th	41st	-	13th	-
(China) 2022 Beijing	78th	88th	-	-	15th	-

=== World Championships ===
0 medals

Event	Individual	Sprint	Pursuit	Mass start	Relay	Mixed relay	Single Mixed relay
(Finland) 2015 Kontiolahti	40th	64th	-	-	15th	19th	-
(Norway) 2016 Oslo	-	63rd	-	-	14th	21st	-
(Austria) 2017 Hochfilzen	-	78th	-	-	21st	-	-
(Sweden) 2019 Östersund	38th	67th	-	-	14th	14th	-
(Italy) 2020 Antholz	86th	80th	-	-	21st	15th	-
(Slovenia) 2021 Pokljuka	93rd	91st	-	-	21st	19th	-

=== European Championships ===
0 medals

Event	Individual	Super sprint	Sprint	Pursuit	Mixed relay	Single Mixed relay
(Belarus) 2020 Raubichi	-	27th	47th	33rd	6th	-
(Poland) 2021 Duszniki-Zdrój	44th	-	25th	38th	15th	-

*During Olympic seasons competitions are only held for those events not included in the Olympic program.
**The single mixed relay was added as an event in 2019.
