= Adam Runnalls =

Canadian biathlete (born 1998)

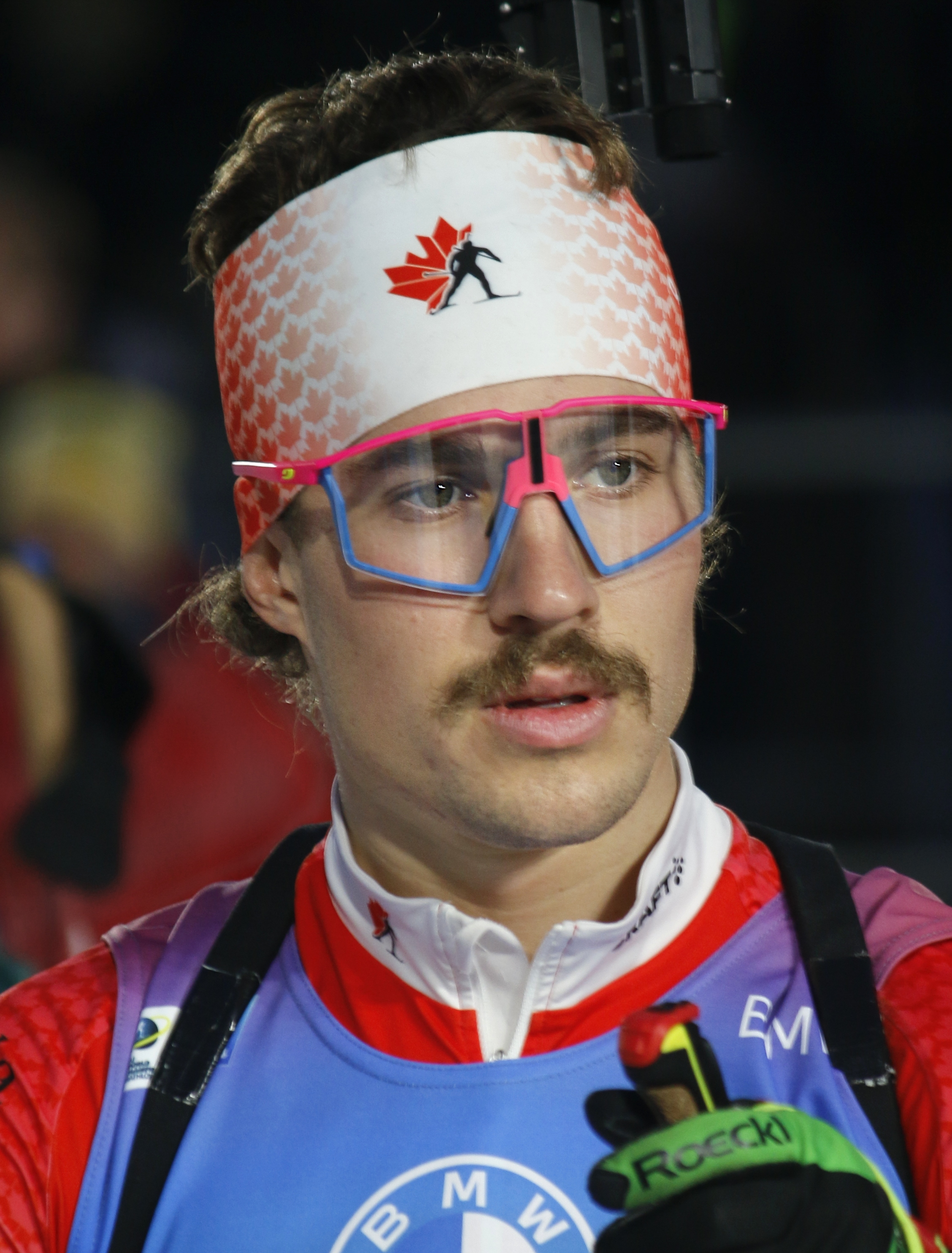
- Runnalls in 2024

Personal information
- Born: 3 October 1998 (age 28) Calgary, Alberta, Canada

Sport
- Sport: Biathlon

Adam Runnalls (born 3 October 1998) is a Canadian biathlete.

In January 2022, Runnalls was named to Canada's 2022 Olympic team. At the games, Runnalls was part of the relay team that finished in 6th, Canada's highest ever placement in the event.

== Career results ==
=== Olympic Games ===
0 medals

Event	Individual	Sprint	Pursuit	Mass start	Relay	Mixed relay
(China) 2022 Beijing	33rd	35th	30th	—	6th	—
(Italy) 2026 Milano Cortina	64th	31st	49h	—	17th	17th

=== World Championships ===
0 medals

Event	Individual	Sprint	Pursuit	Mass start	Relay	Mixed relay	Single mixed relay
(Italy) 2020 Antholz	—	81st	—	—	14th	—	—
(Slovenia) 2021 Pokljuka	38th	55th	54th	—	12th	—	—
(Germany) 2023 Oberhof	30th	82nd	—	—	11th	8th	13th
(Czech Republic) 2024 Nové Město na Moravě	31st	17th	50th	29th	19th	13th	21st
