= Olli Hiidensalo =

Finnish biathlete (born 1991)

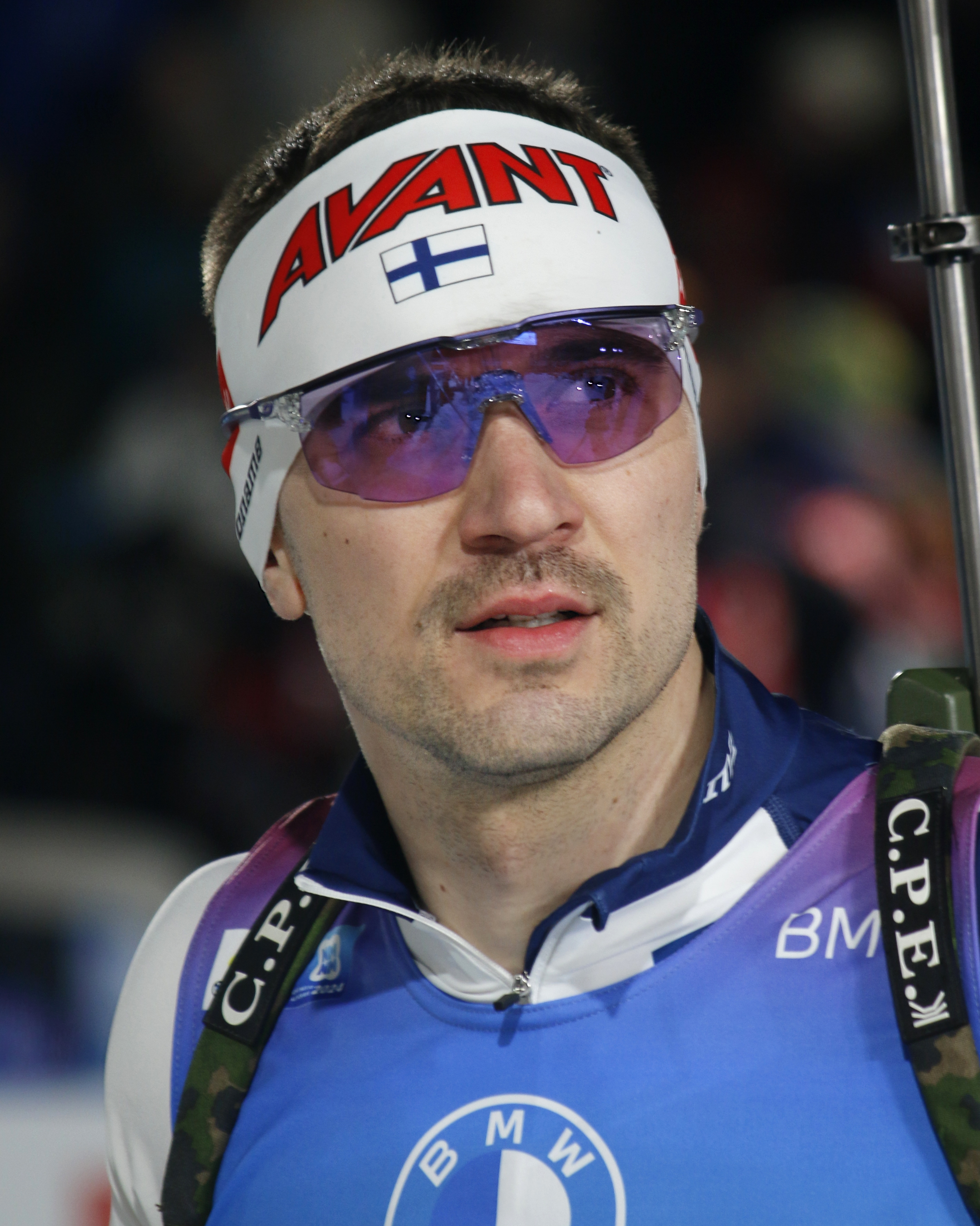
- Hiidensalo in 2024

Personal information
- Nationality: Finnish
- Born: 2 February 1991 (age 35) Nummi-Pusula, Finland
- Height: 6 ft 0 in (183 cm)
- Weight: 181 lb (82 kg; 12 st 13 lb)

Sport
- Country: Finland
- Sport: Biathlon

Olli Hiidensalo (born 2 February 1991) is a Finnish biathlete. He was born in Nummi-Pusula. He has competed in the Biathlon World Cup, and represented Finland at the Biathlon World Championships 2016.

== Biathlon results ==
All results are sourced from the International Biathlon Union.

=== Olympic Games ===
0 medals

Event	Individual	Sprint	Pursuit	Mass start	Relay	Mixed relay
(South Korea) 2018 Pyeongchang	73rd	19th	35th	—	—	6th
(China) 2022 Beijing	74th	38th	52nd	—	17th	11th
(Italy) 2026 Milano Cortina	4th	11th	17th	14th	7th	6th

=== World Championships ===
0 medals

Event	Individual	Sprint	Pursuit	Mass start	Relay	Mixed relay	Single Mixed relay
(Austria) 2017 Hochfilzen	49th	48th	36th	—	20th	10th	—
(Sweden) 2019 Östersund	62nd	25th	47th	—	17th	10th	—
(Italy) 2020 Rasen-Antholz	66th	55th	58th		26th	9th	
(Slovenia) 2021 Pokljuka	94th	28th	51st	—	19th	—	—
(Germany) 2023 Oberhof	31st	30th	50th	—	10th	11th	10th
(Czech Republic) 2024 Nové Město na Moravě	59th	61st	—	—	8th	—	—
(Switzerland) 2025 Lenzerheide	4th	31st	38th	—	—	9th	—

*During Olympic seasons competitions are only held for those events not included in the Olympic program.
**The single mixed relay was added as an event in 2019.
