= Michal Šíma =

Slovak biathlete (born 1992)

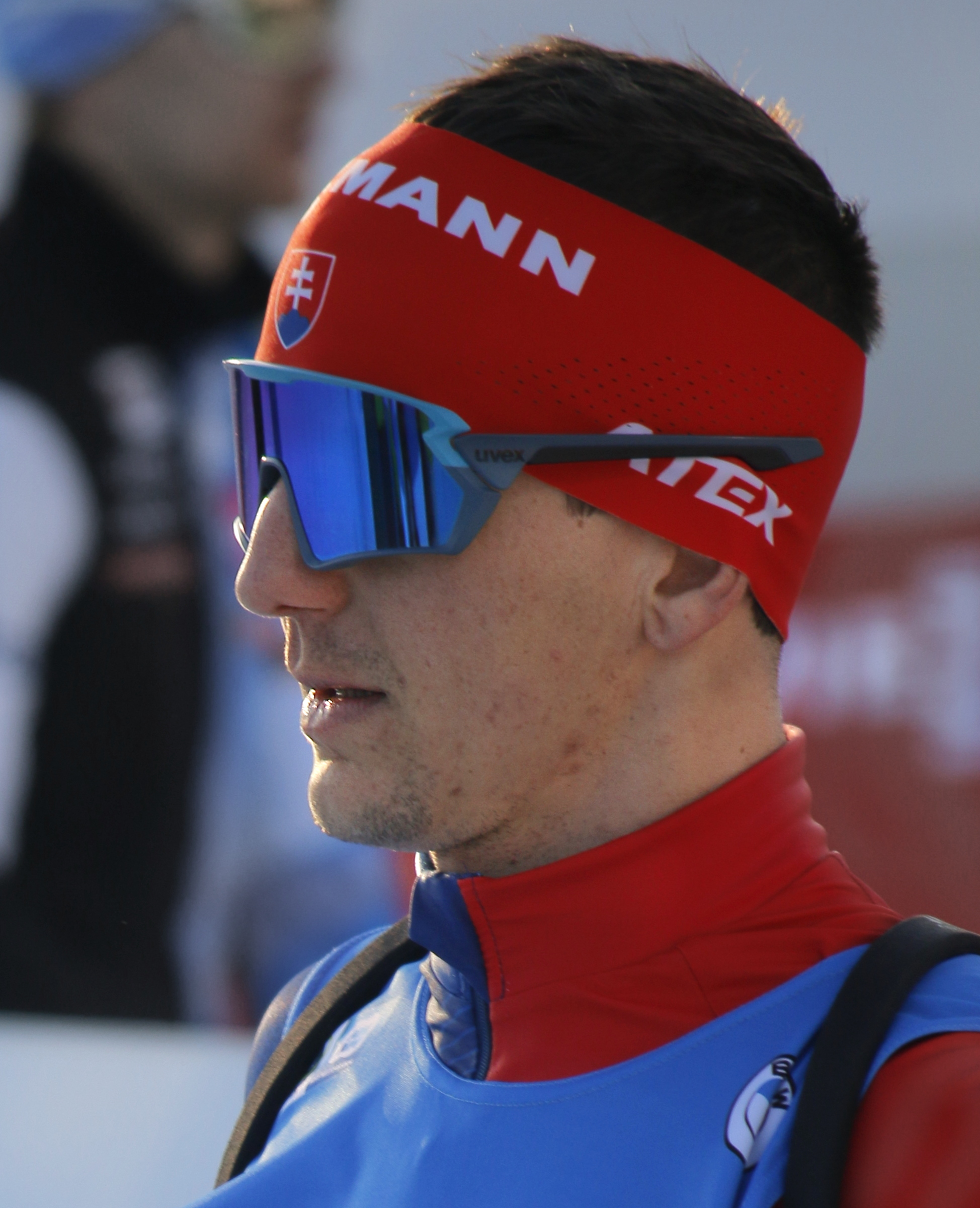
- Michal Šíma in 2023

Personal information
- Nationality: Slovak
- Born: 28 April 1992 (age 32); Brezno, Czechoslovakia

Sport
- Sport: Biathlon

Michal Šíma (born 28 April 1992) is a Slovak biathlete. He competed in the 2018 Winter Olympics.

== Biathlon results ==
All results are sourced from the International Biathlon Union.

=== Olympic Games ===
0 medals

Event	Individual	Sprint	Pursuit	Mass start	Relay	Mixed relay
(South Korea) 2018 Pyeongchang	85th	—	—	—	—	—
(China) 2022 Beijing	43rd	68th	—	—	21st	17th

=== World Championships ===
0 medals

Event	Individual	Sprint	Pursuit	Mass start	Relay	Mixed relay	Single Mixed relay
(Austria) 2017 Hochfilzen	91st	62nd	-	-	12th	-	-
(Sweden) 2019 Östersund	86th	-	-	-	18th	-	-
(Italy) 2020 Antholz	78th	-	-	-	17th	19th	-
(Slovenia) 2021 Pokljuka	63rd	36th	52nd	-	17th	18th	-
(Germany) 2023 Oberhof	71st	34th	54th	-	-	16th	24th

*During Olympic seasons competitions are only held for those events not included in the Olympic program.
**The single mixed relay was added as an event in 2019.
