= Matej Baloga =

Slovak biathlete (born 1997)

Personal information
- Nationality: Slovak
- Born: 8 August 1997 (age 27); Prešov, Slovakia

Sport
- Sport: Biathlon
- Club: UMB BIathlon Team

Matej Baloga (born 8 August 1997) is a Slovak biathlete. He competed in the 2022 Winter Olympics. Baloga won his first international medal at the 2021 Summer World Championships, winning silver in the sprint.

== Biathlon results ==
All results are sourced from the International Biathlon Union.

=== Olympic Games ===
0 medals

Event	Individual	Sprint	Pursuit	Mass start	Relay	Mixed relay
(China) 2022 Beijing	84th	85th	—	—	21st	—

=== World Championships ===
0 medals

Event	Individual	Sprint	Pursuit	Mass start	Relay	Mixed relay	Single Mixed relay
(Slovenia) 2021 Pokljuka	85th	—	—	—	17th	—	—

*During Olympic seasons competitions are only held for those events not included in the Olympic program.
