= China at the 2022 Winter Olympics =

- Flag of China
- IOC code: CHN
- NOC: Chinese Olympic Committee
- Website: www.olympic.cn (in Chinese and English)

in Beijing, China February 4–20, 2022
- Competitors: 182 (96 men and 86 women) in 15 sports
- Flag bearers (opening): Zhao Dan; Gao Tingyu
- Flag bearers (closing): Xu Mengtao; Gao Tingyu
- Medals Ranked 4th: Gold 9 Silver 4 Bronze 2 Total 15

Winter Olympics appearances (overview)
- 1980; 1984; 1988; 1992; 1994; 1998; 2002; 2006; 2010; 2014; 2018; 2022; 2026

The People's Republic of China (PRC) was the host nation at the 2022 Winter Olympics in Beijing which took place from 4 to 20 February 2022. As the host, China sent its largest ever contingent at the Winter Games: 387 personnel, of which 176 were athletes.

Zhao Dan and Gao Tingyu were the country's flagbearers during the opening ceremony. Xu Mengtao and Gao Tingyu were the closing-ceremony flagbearers.

== Achievements and records ==
- Yongqing Lamu (Yangchen Lhamo) and Ciren Zhandui (Tsering Damdul) became the first Tibetan athletes to be qualified for the Winter Olympics, in the snowboarding and cross-country skiing event respectively.
- Dinigeer Yilamujiang became one of the first Uyghur athletes to compete in the Winter Olympics for China, and the first Uyghur-ethnic Chinese to light the Olympics flame.
- It is China's most successful appearance at the Winter Olympics with nine golds and a total of 15 medals, and ranking fourth on the medal tally by gold medals, and eleventh place by total medals. China also broke the record for the most gold medals won by Asian countries at a single Winter Olympics (9), which was previously set by South Korea in 2010 and 2006 (6).

== Medalists ==
Medal	Name	Sport	Event	Date
Gold	Qu Chunyu; Fan Kexin; Wu Dajing; Ren Ziwei; Zhang Yuting	Short track speed skating	Mixed 2000 metre relay	February 5
Gold	Ren Ziwei	Short track speed skating	Men's 1000 metres	February 7
Gold	Eileen Gu	Freestyle skiing	Women's big air	February 8
Gold	Gao Tingyu	Speed skating	Men's 500 meters	February 12
Gold	Xu Mengtao	Freestyle skiing	Women's aerials	February 14
Gold	Su Yiming	Snowboarding	Men's big air	February 15
Gold	Qi Guangpu	Freestyle skiing	Men's aerials	February 16
Gold	Eileen Gu	Freestyle skiing	Women's halfpipe	February 18
Gold	Sui Wenjing; Han Cong	Figure skating	Pairs	February 19
Silver	Su Yiming	Snowboarding	Men's slopestyle	February 7
Silver	Li Wenlong	Short track speed skating	Men's 1000 metres	February 7
Silver	Xu Mengtao; Jia Zongyang; Qi Guangpu	Freestyle skiing	Mixed team aerials	February 10
Silver	Eileen Gu	Freestyle skiing	Women's slopestyle	February 15
Bronze	Yan Wengang	Skeleton	Men's	February 11
Bronze	Han Yutong; Qu Chunyu; Fan Kexin; Zhang Yuting	Short track speed skating	Women's 3000 metre relay	February 13

Medals by date
Day	Date	1st place, gold medalist(s)	2nd place, silver medalist(s)	3rd place, bronze medalist(s)	Total
1	5 February	1	0	0	1
2	6 February	0	0	0	0
3	7 February	1	2	0	3
4	8 February	1	0	0	1
5	9 February	0	0	0	0
6	10 February	0	1	0	1
7	11 February	0	0	1	1
8	12 February	1	0	0	1
9	13 February	0	0	1	1
10	14 February	1	0	0	1
11	15 February	1	1	0	2
12	16 February	1	0	0	1
13	17 February	0	0	0	0
14	18 February	1	0	0	1
15	19 February	1	0	0	1
16	20 February	0	0	0	0
Total		9	4	2	15

== Competitors ==
The following is a list of the number of competitors participating at the Games per sport/discipline.

Sport	Men	Women	Total
Alpine skiing	2	2	4
Biathlon	4	4	8
Bobsleigh	9	4	13
Cross-country skiing	6	6	12
Curling	6	6	12
Figure skating	4	4	8
Freestyle skiing	9	11	20
Ice hockey	25	23	48
Luge	3	1	4
Nordic combined	4	0	4
Short track speed skating	5	5	10
Skeleton	2	2	4
Ski jumping	4	2	6
Speed skating	6	8	14
Snowboarding	5	8	13
Total	96	86	182

== Alpine skiing ==
By using their status as host, China has qualified two male and two female alpine skiers.

Athlete	Event	Run 1		Run 2		Total	
Athlete	Event	Time	Rank	Time	Rank	Time	Rank
Xu Mingfu	Men's combined	1:55.32	24	1:05.08	17	3:00.40	17
Zhang Yangming	Men's combined	1:55.25	23	54.47	13	2:49.72	16
Xu Mingfu	Men's downhill	—N/a				1:56.93	36
Zhang Yangming	Men's downhill	—N/a				DNF	
Xu Mingfu	Men's giant slalom	1:15.96	41	1:17.26	31	2:33.22	33
Zhang Yangming	Men's giant slalom	1:15.66	40	1:19.51	35	2:35.17	36
Xu Mingfu	Men's slalom	DNF		Did not advance			
Zhang Yangming	Men's slalom	DNF		Did not advance			
Xu Mingfu	Men's super-G	—N/a				DNF	
Zhang Yangming	Men's super-G	—N/a				1:29.39	33
Kong Fanying	Women's combined	1:41.95	24	1:05.73	15	2:47.68	15
Kong Fanying	Women's downhill	—N/a				1:44.53	31
Kong Fanying	Women's giant slalom	1:08.25	50	1:07.17	41	2:15.42	40
Ni Yueming	Women's giant slalom	1:08.75	53	1:08.31	43	2:17.06	44
Kong Fanying	Women's slalom	1:05.97	54	1:05.98	47	2:11.95	47
Ni Yueming	Women's slalom	DNF		Did not advance			
Kong Fanying	Women's super-G	—N/a				1:23.51	41
Ni Yueming	Women's super-G	—N/a				1:22.59	40

Mixed

Athlete	Event	Round of 16	Quarterfinals	Semifinals	Final / BM	
Athlete	Event	Opposition Result	Opposition Result	Opposition Result	Opposition Result	Rank
Xu Mingfu; Zhang Yangming; Kong Fanying; Ni Yueming	Team	Switzerland; L 0–4	Did not advance			15

== Biathlon ==
Men

Athlete	Event	Time	Misses	Rank
Cheng Fangming	Individual	56:07.8	6 (2+1+0+3)	69
Yan Xingyuan	Individual	53:40.6	3 (1+1+1+0)	39
Zhang Chunyu	Individual	1:07:12.2	12 (2+4+5+1)	92
Zhu Zhenyu	Individual	58:42.6	4 (1+2+1+0)	83
Cheng Fangming	Mass start	44:26.8	4 (4+0+0+0)	30
Cheng Fangming	Pursuit	43:30.4	4 (1+2+1+0)	22
Yan Xingyuan	Pursuit	45:30.2	5 (2+1+1+1)	41
Cheng Fangming	Sprint	25:53.3	1 (0+1)	32
Yan Xingyuan	Sprint	26:16.7	1 (1+0)	40
Zhang Chunyu	Sprint	27:14.2	1 (0+1)	76
Zhu Zhenyu	Sprint	27:28.6	3 (2+1)	81
Cheng Fangming; Yan Xingyuan; Zhu Zhenyu; Zhang Chunyu	Relay	1:26:27.5	13 (2+11)	16

Women

Athlete	Event	Time	Misses	Rank
Chu Yuanmeng	Individual	48:58.8	2 (0+0+0+2)	35
Ding Yuhuan	Individual	54:14.6	5 (2+1+0+2)	81
Meng Fanqi	Individual	49:56.5	2 (0+0+0+2)	47
Tang Jialin	Individual	51:16.0	4 (1+1+1+1)	59
Tang Jialin	Pursuit	41:48.3	4 (1+0+1+2)	53
Chu Yuanmeng	Sprint	23:32.6	2 (1+1)	61
Ding Yuhuan	Sprint	24:33.1	2 (1+1)	76
Meng Fanqi	Sprint	23:33.7	1 (1+0)	62
Tang Jialin	Sprint	23:03.5	1 (1+0)	35
Tang Jialin; Chu Yuanmeng; Ding Yuhuan; Meng Fanqi	Relay	1:16:11.5	1+5	12

Mixed

Athlete	Event	Time	Misses	Rank
Cheng Fangming; Chu Yuanmeng; Meng Fanqi; Yan Xingyuan	Relay	1:11:28.1	12 (0+12)	15

== Bobsleigh ==
Athlete	Event	Run 1		Run 2		Run 3		Run 4		Total	
Athlete	Event	Time	Rank	Time	Rank	Time	Rank	Time	Rank	Time	Rank
Sun Kaizhi*; Wu Qingze	Two-man	1:00.04	19	1:00.01	9	59.99	13	1:00.25	15	4:00.29	14
Li Chunjian*; Liu Wei	Two-man	1:00.31	24	1:00.36	18	1:00.43	22	—N/a		3:01.10	22
Li Chunjian*; Ding Song; Ye Jielong; Shi Hao	Four-man	59.31	16	59.55	13	59.46	18	59.66	17	3:57.98	17
Sun Kaizhi*; Wu Qingze; Wu Zhitao; Zhen Heng	Four-man	59.38	18	59.65	18	59.47	19	59.47	12	3:57.97	16
Huai Mingming	Women's monobob	1:05.18	6	1:05.72	9	1:05.71	7	1:05.97	8	4:22.58	6
Ying Qing	Women's monobob	1:05.16	5	1:05.99	12	1:05.82	9	1:06.44	14	4:23.41	9
Huai Mingming*; Wang Xuan	Two-woman	1:01.88	11	1:02.17	14	1:02.11	12	1:02.10	12	4:08.26	11
Ying Qing*; Du Jiani	Two-woman	1:01.92	14	1:02.19	15	1:02.29	17	1:02.09	11	4:08.49	14

* – Denotes the driver of the sled

== Cross-country skiing ==
By using their status as host, China qualified four male cross-country skiers. They also qualified four female skiers, and added a fifth through reallocation.

Distance
Men

Athlete	Event	Classical		Freestyle		Total		
Athlete	Event	Time	Rank	Time	Rank	Time	Deficit	Rank
Ciren Zhandui	15 km classical	—N/a				43:22.2	+5:27.4	63
Hadesi Badelihan	15 km classical	—N/a				42:48.1	+4:53.3	57
Liu Rongsheng	15 km classical	—N/a				41:51.7	+3:56.9	47
Shang Jincai	15 km classical	—N/a				41:29.6	+3:34.8	41
Chen Degen	30 km skiathlon	45:55.6	60	LAP				59
Hadesi Badelihan	30 km skiathlon	44:04.2	49	LAP				50
Liu Rongsheng	30 km skiathlon	43:19.3	45	41:05.6	37	1:24:59.6	+8:49.8	38
Shang Jincai	30 km skiathlon	43:03.2	41	43:08.8	48	1:26:48.2	+10:38.4	49
Chen Degen	50 km freestyle	—N/a				1:18:14.1	+6:41.4	41
Hadesi Badelihan	50 km freestyle	—N/a				1:19:45.9	+8:13.2	45
Liu Rongsheng	50 km freestyle	—N/a				1:19:58.5	+8:25.8	48
Wang Qiang	50 km freestyle	—N/a				1:19:53.5	+8:20.8	46
Chen Degen; Liu Rongsheng; Shang Jincai; Wang Qiang	4 × 10 km relay	—N/a				LAP		13

Women

Athlete	Event	Classical		Freestyle		Total		
Athlete	Event	Time	Rank	Time	Rank	Time	Deficit	Rank
Chi Chunxue	10 km classical	—N/a				31:10.6	+3:04.3	39
Dinigeer Yilamujiang	10 km classical	—N/a				32:23.8	+4:17.5	56
Li Xin	10 km classical	—N/a				31:36.9	+3:30.6	45
Ma Qinghua	10 km classical	—N/a				31:52.3	+3:46.0	50
Chi Chunxue	15 km skiathlon	24:45.5	35	23:40.7	34	49:08.3	+4:54.6	34
Dinigeer Yilamujiang	15 km skiathlon	25:26.8	45	24:01.7	39	50:10.7	+5:57.0	43
Jialin Bayani	15 km skiathlon	25:41.2	48	24:00.3	38	50:20.2	+6:06.5	46
Li Xin	15 km skiathlon	25:03.1	38	23:27.6	28	49:07.7	+4:54.0	33
Chi Chunxue	30 km freestyle	—N/a				1:35:41.0	+10:47.0	38
Dinigeer Yilamujiang	30 km freestyle	—N/a				1:50:04.2	+25:10.2	60
Jialin Bayani	30 km freestyle	—N/a				1:39:14.8	+14:20.8	47
Li Xin	30 km freestyle	—N/a				1:38:39.2	+13:45.2	46
Chi Chunxue; Li Xin; Jialin Bayani; Ma Qinghua	4 × 5 km relay	—N/a				57:49.7	+4:08.7	10

Sprint
Men & Women

Athlete	Event	Qualification		Quarterfinals		Semifinals		Final	
Athlete	Event	Time	Rank	Time	Rank	Time	Rank	Time	Rank
Ciren Zhandui	Men's sprint	3:03.22	60	Did not advance					
Liu Rongsheng	Men's sprint	3:12.14	79	Did not advance					
Shang Jincai	Men's sprint	3:06.52	67	Did not advance					
Wang Qiang	Men's sprint	2:48.91	5 Q	DSQ		Did not advance			30
Wang Qiang; Shang Jincai	Men's team sprint	—N/a				20:12.40	7	Did not advance	13
Chi Chunxue	Women's sprint	3:25.31	38	Did not advance					
Dinigeer Yilamujiang	Women's sprint	3:34.55	56	Did not advance					
Jialin Bayani	Women's sprint	3:39.27	66	Did not advance					
Ma Qinghua	Women's sprint	3:25.05	36	Did not advance					
Chi Chunxue; Li Xin	Women's team sprint	—N/a				23:43.93	5	Did not advance	11

== Curling ==
Summary

Team	Event	Group stage										Semifinal	Final / BM	
Team	Event	Opposition Score	Opposition Score	Opposition Score	Opposition Score	Opposition Score	Opposition Score	Opposition Score	Opposition Score	Opposition Score	Rank	Opposition Score	Opposition Score	Rank
Ma Xiuyue; Zou Qiang; Wang Zhiyu; Xu Jingtao; Jiang Dongxu	Men's tournament	SWE; L 4–6	ROC; L 4–7	DEN; W 5–4	ITA; W 12–9	GBR; L 6–7	USA; L 6–8	CAN; L 8–10	NOR; W 8–6	SUI; W 6–5	5	Did not advance		
Han Yu; Wang Rui; Dong Ziqi; Zhang Lijun; Jiang Xindi	Women's tournament	DEN; L 6–7	SUI; L 5–7	USA; L 4–8	SWE; W 9–6	KOR; W 6–5	JPN; L 2–10	ROC; L 5–11	GBR; W 8–4	CAN; W 11–9	7	Did not advance		
Fan Suyuan; Ling Zhi	Mixed doubles tournament	SUI; W 7–6	AUS; W 6–5	SWE; L 6–7	CAN; L 6–8	USA; L 5–7	NOR; L 6–9	GBR; L 5–6	ITA; L 4–8	CZE; L 6–8	9	Did not advance		

=== Men's tournament ===
China has qualified their men's team (five athletes) as the host nation.

Final Round Robin Standings
Team	Skip	Pld	W	L	W–L	PF	PA	EW	EL	BE	SE	S%	DSC	Qualification
Great Britain	Bruce Mouat	9	8	1	–	63	44	39	31	5	10	88.0%	18.81	Playoffs
Sweden	Niklas Edin	9	7	2	–	64	44	43	30	10	11	85.7%	14.02	Playoffs
Canada	Brad Gushue	9	5	4	1–0	58	50	34	38	7	7	84.4%	26.49	Playoffs
United States	John Shuster	9	5	4	0–1	56	61	35	41	4	5	83.0%	32.29	Playoffs
China	Ma Xiuyue	9	4	5	2–1; 1–0	59	62	39	36	6	4	85.4%	23.55	
Norway	Steffen Walstad	9	4	5	2–1; 0–1	58	53	40	36	0	11	84.4%	20.96	
Switzerland	Peter de Cruz	9	4	5	1–2; 1–0	51	54	33	38	13	3	84.5%	15.74	
ROC	Sergey Glukhov	9	4	5	1–2; 0–1	58	58	33	38	6	6	81.2%	33.72	
Italy	Joël Retornaz	9	3	6	–	59	65	36	35	3	8	81.7%	30.76	
Denmark	Mikkel Krause	9	1	8	–	36	71	30	39	3	2	78.1%	32.84	

Round robin

China had a bye in draws 4, 8, and 12.

Draw 1

Wednesday, 9 February, 20:05

Sheet D	1	2	3	4	5	6	7	8	9	10	Final
China (Ma)	0	0	0	0	1	1	0	2	0	0	4
Sweden (Edin) 🔨	0	0	1	2	0	0	2	0	0	1	6

Draw 2

Thursday, 10 February, 14:05

Sheet C	1	2	3	4	5	6	7	8	9	10	Final
China (Ma) 🔨	1	1	0	1	0	0	0	1	0	X	4
ROC (Glukhov)	0	0	1	0	1	1	0	0	4	X	7

Draw 3

Friday, 11 February, 9:05

Sheet D	1	2	3	4	5	6	7	8	9	10	Final
Denmark (Krause)	0	1	0	1	0	1	0	1	0	0	4
China (Ma) 🔨	1	0	1	0	2	0	1	0	0	0	5

Draw 5

Saturday, 12 February, 14:05

Sheet A	1	2	3	4	5	6	7	8	9	10	Final
Italy (Retornaz)	0	1	0	3	0	2	1	0	2	0	9
China (Ma) 🔨	2	0	3	0	3	0	0	3	0	1	12

Draw 6

Sunday, 13 February, 9:05

Sheet B	1	2	3	4	5	6	7	8	9	10	Final
China (Ma) 🔨	1	0	0	2	0	0	0	0	1	2	6
Great Britain (Mouat)	0	4	0	0	0	0	0	3	0	0	7

Draw 7

Sunday, 13 February, 20:05

Sheet D	1	2	3	4	5	6	7	8	9	10	Final
China (Ma) 🔨	1	0	1	0	1	0	0	2	1	0	6
United States (Shuster)	0	2	0	3	0	2	0	0	0	1	8

Draw 9

Tuesday, 15 February, 9:05

Sheet B	1	2	3	4	5	6	7	8	9	10	Final
Canada (Gushue)	0	2	0	2	0	2	0	3	0	1	10
China (Ma) 🔨	1	0	2	0	2	0	1	0	2	0	8

Draw 10

Tuesday, 15 February, 20:05

Sheet C	1	2	3	4	5	6	7	8	9	10	Final
Norway (Walstad)	0	1	0	2	0	0	1	0	2	0	6
China (Ma) 🔨	1	0	2	0	0	1	0	3	0	1	8

Draw 11

Wednesday, 16 February, 14:05

Sheet A	1	2	3	4	5	6	7	8	9	10	Final
China (Ma)	0	0	1	0	2	0	0	1	0	2	6
Switzerland (de Cruz) 🔨	0	2	0	1	0	0	1	0	1	0	5

=== Women's tournament ===
China has qualified their women's team (five athletes) as the host nation.

Final Round Robin Standings
Team	Skip	Pld	W	L	W–L	PF	PA	EW	EL	BE	SE	S%	DSC	Qualification
Switzerland	Silvana Tirinzoni	9	8	1	–	67	46	44	36	4	12	81.6%	19.14	Playoffs
Sweden	Anna Hasselborg	9	7	2	–	64	49	39	35	6	12	82.0%	25.02	Playoffs
Great Britain	Eve Muirhead	9	5	4	1–1	63	47	39	33	4	9	80.6%	35.27	Playoffs
Japan	Satsuki Fujisawa	9	5	4	1–1	64	62	40	36	2	13	82.3%	36.00	Playoffs
Canada	Jennifer Jones	9	5	4	1–1	71	59	42	41	1	14	80.4%	45.44	
United States	Tabitha Peterson	9	4	5	2–0	60	64	40	39	2	12	79.5%	33.87	
China	Han Yu	9	4	5	1–1	56	67	38	41	3	10	79.6%	30.06	
South Korea	Kim Eun-jung	9	4	5	0–2	62	66	40	42	3	10	80.8%	27.79	
Denmark	Madeleine Dupont	9	2	7	–	50	68	33	41	7	0	77.2%	23.36	
ROC	Alina Kovaleva	9	1	8	–	50	79	34	45	2	7	78.9%	29.34	

Round robin

China had a bye in draws 4, 8, and 12.

Draw 1

Thursday, 10 February, 9:05

Sheet B	1	2	3	4	5	6	7	8	9	10	Final
Denmark (Dupont) 🔨	0	2	0	1	0	0	3	0	0	1	7
China (Han)	0	0	1	0	2	0	0	1	2	0	6

Draw 2

Thursday, 10 February, 20:05

Sheet D	1	2	3	4	5	6	7	8	9	10	Final
China (Han) 🔨	0	1	0	1	0	1	0	2	0	0	5
Switzerland (Tirinzoni)	1	0	1	0	1	0	2	0	1	1	7

Draw 3

Friday, 11 February, 14:05

Sheet A	1	2	3	4	5	6	7	8	9	10	Final
United States (Peterson)	2	0	1	1	1	1	0	2	0	X	8
China (Han) 🔨	0	1	0	0	0	0	2	0	1	X	4

Draw 5

Saturday, 12 February, 20:05

Sheet D	1	2	3	4	5	6	7	8	9	10	Final
Sweden (Hasselborg)	0	0	2	0	0	2	2	0	0	X	6
China (Han) 🔨	0	3	0	1	2	0	0	2	1	X	9

Draw 6

Sunday, 13 February, 14:05

Sheet C	1	2	3	4	5	6	7	8	9	10	11	Final
South Korea (Kim)	2	0	0	1	0	1	0	0	0	1	0	5
China (Han) 🔨	0	1	1	0	1	0	0	2	0	0	1	6

Draw 7

Monday, 14 February, 9:05

Sheet B	1	2	3	4	5	6	7	8	9	10	Final
China (Han)	0	1	0	0	0	1	0	0	X	X	2
Japan (Fujisawa) 🔨	0	0	3	1	3	0	2	1	X	X	10

Draw 9

Tuesday, 15 February, 14:05

Sheet A	1	2	3	4	5	6	7	8	9	10	Final
China (Han) 🔨	2	0	0	2	0	1	0	0	X	X	5
ROC (Kovaleva)	0	1	1	0	4	0	3	2	X	X	11

Draw 10

Wednesday, 16 February, 9:05

Sheet C	1	2	3	4	5	6	7	8	9	10	Final
China (Han)	0	0	1	0	1	0	2	0	3	1	8
Great Britain (Muirhead) 🔨	1	0	0	1	0	1	0	1	0	0	4

Draw 11

Wednesday, 16 February, 20:05

Sheet D	1	2	3	4	5	6	7	8	9	10	11	Final
Canada (Jones) 🔨	0	0	1	2	0	5	0	0	1	0	0	9
China (Han)	1	2	0	0	2	0	2	1	0	1	2	11

=== Mixed doubles tournament ===
China has qualified their mixed doubles team (two athletes) as the host nation.

Final Round Robin Standings
Team	Athletes	Pld	W	L	W–L	PF	PA	EW	EL	BE	SE	S%	DSC	Qualification
Italy	Stefania Constantini / Amos Mosaner	9	9	0	–	79	48	43	28	0	17	79%	25.34	Playoffs
Norway	Kristin Skaslien / Magnus Nedregotten	9	6	3	1–0	68	50	40	28	0	15	82%	24.48	Playoffs
Great Britain	Jennifer Dodds / Bruce Mouat	9	6	3	0–1	60	50	38	33	0	12	79%	22.48	Playoffs
Sweden	Almida de Val / Oskar Eriksson	9	5	4	1–0	55	54	35	33	0	10	76%	21.77	Playoffs
Canada	Rachel Homan / John Morris	9	5	4	0–1	57	54	33	39	0	8	78%	53.73	
Czech Republic	Zuzana Paulová / Tomáš Paul	9	4	5	–	50	65	29	39	1	7	75%	33.41	
Switzerland	Jenny Perret / Martin Rios	9	3	6	1–0	55	58	32	39	0	6	73%	39.04	
United States	Vicky Persinger / Chris Plys	9	3	6	0–1	50	67	34	36	0	9	74%	27.29	
China	Fan Suyuan / Ling Zhi	9	2	7	1–0	51	64	34	36	0	7	74%	17.81	
Australia	Tahli Gill / Dean Hewitt	9	2	7	0–1	52	67	31	38	1	8	72%	50.51	

Round robin

China had a bye in draws 3, 5, 7, and 12.

Draw 1

Wednesday, 2 February, 20:05

Sheet D	1	2	3	4	5	6	7	8	9	Final
China (Fan / Ling) 🔨	1	1	1	0	1	0	2	0	1	7
Switzerland (Perret / Rios)	0	0	0	2	0	3	0	1	0	6

Draw 2

Thursday, 3 February, 9:05

Sheet A	1	2	3	4	5	6	7	8	Final
Australia (Gill / Hewitt)	0	1	0	0	0	3	0	1	5
China (Fan / Ling) 🔨	1	0	2	0	1	0	2	0	6

Draw 4

Thursday, 3 February, 20:05

Sheet C	1	2	3	4	5	6	7	8	Final
China (Fan / Ling)	0	2	0	1	1	0	2	0	6
Sweden (de Val / Eriksson) 🔨	1	0	2	0	0	1	0	3	7

Draw 6

Friday, 4 February, 13:35

Sheet B	1	2	3	4	5	6	7	8	Final
China (Fan / Ling) 🔨	1	0	0	2	0	1	0	2	6
Canada (Homan / Morris)	0	2	2	0	2	0	2	0	8

Draw 8

Saturday, 5 February, 14:05

Sheet A	1	2	3	4	5	6	7	8	Final
China (Fan / Ling)	0	1	0	2	0	2	0	X	5
United States (Persinger / Plys) 🔨	2	0	1	0	3	0	1	X	7

Draw 9

Saturday, 5 February, 20:05

Sheet B	1	2	3	4	5	6	7	8	Final
Norway (Skaslien / Nedregotten)	0	2	1	1	0	5	0	X	9
China (Fan / Ling) 🔨	1	0	0	0	2	0	3	X	6

Draw 10

Sunday, 6 February, 9:05

Sheet B	1	2	3	4	5	6	7	8	Final
Great Britain (Dodds / Mouat)	1	0	0	0	3	1	0	1	6
China (Fan / Ling) 🔨	0	2	1	1	0	0	1	0	5

Draw 11

Sunday, 6 February, 14:05

Sheet C	1	2	3	4	5	6	7	8	Final
Italy (Constantini / Mosaner)	3	1	0	1	0	1	1	1	8
China (Fan / Ling) 🔨	0	0	1	0	3	0	0	0	4

Draw 13

Monday, 7 February, 9:05

Sheet D	1	2	3	4	5	6	7	8	Final
Czech Republic (Paulová / Paul)	0	1	0	0	0	4	1	2	8
China (Fan / Ling) 🔨	1	0	3	1	1	0	0	0	6

== Figure skating ==
In the 2021 World Figure Skating Championships in Stockholm, Sweden, China secured one quota in the men's and ladies singles, two quotas in pairs, and one quota in the ice dance competition.

Athlete	Event	SP / SD		FS / FD		Total	
Athlete	Event	Points	Rank	Points	Rank	Points	Rank
Jin Boyang	Men's singles	90.98	11 Q	179.45	8	270.43	9
Zhu Yi	Ladies' singles	53.44	27	Did not advance			
Peng Cheng; Jin Yang	Pairs	76.10	5 Q	138.74	6	214.84	5
Sui Wenjing; Han Cong	Pairs	84.41	1 Q	155.47	1	239.88	1st place, gold medalist(s)
Wang Shiyue; Liu Xinyu	Ice dancing	73.41	12 Q	111.01	12	184.42	12

Team

Athlete	Event	Short program/Short dance						Free skate/Free dance					
Athlete	Event	Men's	Ladies'	Pairs	Ice dance	Total		Men's	Ladies'	Pairs	Ice dance	Total	
Athlete	Event	Points Team points	Points Team points	Points Team points	Points Team points	Points	Rank	Points Team points	Points Team points	Points Team points	Points Team points	Points	Rank
Jin Boyang; Zhu Yi; Sui Wenjing / Han Cong (SP); Peng Cheng / Jin Yang (FS); Wang Shiyue / Liu Xinyu	Team event	82.87; 5	47.03; 1	82.83; 10	74.66; 6	22	5	155.04; 7	91.41; 6	131.75; 8	107.18; 7	50	5

== Freestyle skiing ==
Aerials

Athlete	Event	Qualification				Final					
Athlete	Event	Jump 1		Jump 2		Jump 1		Jump 2		Jump 3	
Athlete	Event	Points	Rank	Points	Rank	Points	Rank	Points	Rank	Points	Rank
Jia Zongyang	Men's aerials	125.67	2 Q	Bye		123.45	5	88.69	12	Did not advance	7
Qi Guangpu	Men's aerials	127.88	1 Q	Bye		125.22	3	114.48	8	129.00	1st place, gold medalist(s)
Sun Jiaxu	Men's aerials	85.40	23	110.86	12	Did not advance					18
Wang Xindi	Men's aerials	114.60	12	98.19	8	Did not advance					14
Kong Fanyu	Women's aerials	83.78	9	81.99	4 Q	102.71	3 Q	62.24	3	59.67	6
Shao Qi	Women's aerials	77.49	15	77.49	11	Did not advance					17
Xu Mengtao	Women's aerials	101.10	3 Q	Bye		103.89	2 Q	DNS		108.61	1st place, gold medalist(s)

Athlete	Event	Final 1		Final 2	
Athlete	Event	Points	Rank	Points	Rank
Xu Mengtao; Jia Zongyang; Qi Guangpu	Mixed team	336.89	1	324.22	2nd place, silver medalist(s)

Moguls

Athlete	Event	Qualification								Final											
Athlete	Event	Run 1				Run 2				Run 1				Run 2				Run 3			
Athlete	Event	Time	Points	Total	Rank	Time	Points	Total	Rank	Time	Points	Total	Rank	Time	Points	Total	Rank	Time	Points	Total	Rank
Zhao Yang	Men's moguls	28.09	50.51	61.47	28	26.42	51.79	64.95	20	Did not advance											30
Li Nan	Women's moguls	31.76	51.11	63.32	19	46.17	10.67	10.67	15	Did not advance											25

Ski cross

Athlete	Event	Seeding		Round of 16	Quarterfinal	Semifinal	Final	
Athlete	Event	Time	Rank	Position	Position	Position	Position	Rank
Pu Rui	Women's ski cross	1:30.01	25	4	Did not advance			25
Ran Hongyun	Women's ski cross	1:25.85	24	3	Did not advance			24

Half pipe, Slopestyle and Big Air

Athlete	Event	Qualification					Final				
Athlete	Event	Run 1	Run 2	Run 3	Total	Rank	Run 1	Run 2	Run 3	Total	Rank
He Binghan	Men's halfpipe	45.00	17.75	—N/a	45.00	21	Did not advance				
Mao Bingqiang	Men's halfpipe	62.75	66.25	—N/a	66.25	14	Did not advance				
Sun Jingbo	Men's halfpipe	4.25	48.75	—N/a	48.75	18	Did not advance				
Wang Haizhuo	Men's halfpipe	37.00	9.25	—N/a	37.00	22	Did not advance				
He Jinbo	Men's slopestyle	42.83	20.85	—N/a	42.83	21	Did not advance				
He Jinbo	Men's big air	~~45.25~~	36.75	49.00	85.75	27	Did not advance				
Eileen Gu	Women's big air	89.00	~~24.50~~	72.25	161.25	5	93.75	~~88.50~~	94.50	188.25	1st place, gold medalist(s)
Yang Shuorui	Women's big air	~~38.25~~	40.50	55.50	96.00	20	Did not advance				
Eileen Gu	Women's halfpipe	93.75	95.50	—N/a	95.50	1 Q	93.25	95.25	30.00	95.25	1st place, gold medalist(s)
Li Fanghui	Women's halfpipe	84.75	19.25	—N/a	84.75	7 Q	81.75	86.50	16.75	86.50	5
Wu Meng	Women's halfpipe	12.50	67.75	—N/a	67.75	16	Did not advance				
Zhang Kexin	Women's halfpipe	77.50	86.50	—N/a	86.50	5 Q	78.75	25.75	3.25	78.75	7
Eileen Gu	Women's slopestyle	57.28	79.38	—N/a	79.38	3 Q	69.90	16.98	86.23	86.23	2nd place, silver medalist(s)
Yang Shuorui	Women's slopestyle	18.46	39.05	—N/a	39.05	23	Did not advance				

== Ice hockey ==
China has qualified 25 male and 23 female competitors to the ice hockey tournaments as part of their two teams.

Due to the lack of ice hockey talent in China, players were recruited from abroad. The men's hockey team had eleven Canadians, seven Americans, six Chinese and a Russian. Due to their extremely poor performance, their attendance at the games was in question even though they traditionally automatically qualified as the host.

Summary

Key:

- OT – Overtime
- GWS – Match decided by penalty-shootout

Team	Event	Group stage					Qualification playoff	Quarterfinal	Semifinal	Final / BM	
Team	Event	Opposition Score	Opposition Score	Opposition Score	Opposition Score	Rank	Opposition Score	Opposition Score	Opposition Score	Opposition Score	Rank
China men's	Men's	United States; L 0–8	Germany; L 2–3	Canada; L 0–5	—N/a	4	Canada; L 2–7	Did not advance			12
China women's	Women's	Czech Republic; L 1–3	Denmark; W 3–1	Japan; W 2–1	Sweden; L 1–2	4	—N/a	Did not advance			9

=== Men's tournament ===
China men's national ice hockey team qualified as the host.

Team roster

The roster was announced on 28 January 2022.

Due to the lack of ice hockey talent in China players had to be recruited from abroad. The men's hockey team has eleven Canadians, six Chinese, seven Americans, and a Russian. Neither the Chinese Olympic Committee, International Ice Hockey Federation nor the IOC commented on how it was possible for foreign players to compete for China, as the Olympic Charter requires competitors to be citizens of the country they represent. The IOC Executive Board has the authority to make certain exceptions of a "general or individual nature", though it is unclear whether this was the case. When asked whether he had naturalized as a Chinese citizen, athlete Jake Chelios refused to comment, though he confirmed that he still had his American passport.

Head coach: (Italy) Ivano Zanatta

No.	Pos.	Name	Height	Weight	Birthdate	Team
33	G	Pengfei Han	1.81 m (5 ft 11 in)	75 kg (165 lb)	May 29, 1991 (aged 30)	(China) HC Kunlun Red Star
1	G	Paris O'Brien	1.91 m (6 ft 3 in)	82 kg (181 lb)	April 15, 2000 (aged 21)	(China) HC Kunlun Red Star
45	G	Jeremy Smith	1.83 m (6 ft 0 in)	79 kg (175 lb)	April 13, 1989 (aged 32)	(China) HC Kunlun Red Star
7	D	Jake Chelios	1.88 m (6 ft 2 in)	84 kg (185 lb)	March 8, 1991 (aged 30)	(China) HC Kunlun Red Star
6	D	Zimeng Chen	1.78 m (5 ft 10 in)	81 kg (179 lb)	June 26, 1997 (aged 24)	(China) HC Kunlun Red Star
2	D	Jason Fram	1.8 m (5 ft 11 in)	88 kg (194 lb)	April 23, 1995 (aged 26)	(China) HC Kunlun Red Star
60	D	Denis Osipov	1.83 m (6 ft 0 in)	90 kg (198 lb)	May 9, 1987 (aged 34)	(China) HC Kunlun Red Star
77	D	Ty Schultz (A)	1.85 m (6 ft 1 in)	91 kg (201 lb)	March 5, 1997 (aged 24)	(China) HC Kunlun Red Star
5	D	Ryan Sproul	1.93 m (6 ft 4 in)	91 kg (200 lb)	January 13, 1993 (aged 29)	(China) HC Kunlun Red Star
81	D	Ruinan Yan	1.89 m (6 ft 2 in)	90 kg (198 lb)	January 25, 2001 (aged 21)	(China) HC Kunlun Red Star
93	D	Zach Yuen	1.85 m (6 ft 1 in)	89 kg (196 lb)	March 3, 1993 (aged 28)	(China) HC Kunlun Red Star
11	D	Pengfei Zhang	1.77 m (5 ft 10 in)	67 kg (148 lb)	May 9, 1998 (aged 23)	(China) HC Kunlun Red Star
22	F	Parker Foo	1.85 m (6 ft 1 in)	78 kg (172 lb)	September 12, 1998 (aged 23)	(China) HC Kunlun Red Star
15	F	Spencer Foo (A)	1.83 m (6 ft 0 in)	86 kg (190 lb)	May 19, 1994 (aged 27)	(China) HC Kunlun Red Star
17	F	Jianing Guo	1.77 m (5 ft 10 in)	77 kg (170 lb)	April 26, 2000 (aged 21)	(China) HC Kunlun Red Star
47	F	Cory Kane	1.87 m (6 ft 2 in)	94 kg (207 lb)	September 15, 1990 (aged 31)	(China) HC Kunlun Red Star
20	F	Luke Lockhart	1.77 m (5 ft 10 in)	87 kg (192 lb)	November 1, 1992 (aged 29)	(China) HC Kunlun Red Star
61	F	Ethan Werek	1.88 m (6 ft 2 in)	91 kg (200 lb)	June 7, 1991 (aged 30)	(China) HC Kunlun Red Star
91	F	Tyler Wong	1.75 m (5 ft 9 in)	78 kg (172 lb)	February 28, 1996 (aged 25)	(China) HC Kunlun Red Star
10	F	Xudong Xiang	1.75 m (5 ft 9 in)	72 kg (159 lb)	August 24, 1995 (aged 26)	(China) HC Kunlun Red Star
88	F	Yan Juncheng	1.8 m (5 ft 11 in)	82 kg (181 lb)	September 16, 2000 (aged 21)	(China) HC Kunlun Red Star
98	F	Rudi Ying	1.85 m (6 ft 1 in)	77 kg (169 lb)	August 16, 1998 (aged 23)	(China) HC Kunlun Red Star
18	F	Brandon Yip (C)	1.85 m (6 ft 1 in)	88 kg (194 lb)	April 25, 1985 (aged 36)	(China) HC Kunlun Red Star
56	F	Zesen Zhang	1.76 m (5 ft 9 in)	65 kg (143 lb)	December 19, 1996 (aged 25)	(China) HC Kunlun Red Star
19	F	Peter Zhong	1.8 m (5 ft 11 in)	79 kg (174 lb)	July 30, 1998 (aged 23)	(China) HC Kunlun Red Star

Group play

Pos	Team	Pld	W	OTW	OTL	L	GF	GA	GD	Pts	Qualification
1	United States	3	3	0	0	0	15	4	+11	9	Quarterfinals
2	Canada	3	2	0	0	1	12	5	+7	6	Playoffs
3	Germany	3	1	0	0	2	6	10	−4	3	Playoffs
4	China (H)	3	0	0	0	3	2	16	−14	0	Playoffs

Source: IIHF
Rules for classification: Preliminary round tiebreakers
(H) Host

February 10, 2022; 21:10 v	United States	8–0 (1–0, 3–0, 4–0)	China	Beijing National Indoor Stadium, Beijing; Attendance: 947

Game reference

Drew Commesso
Goalies
Jeremy Smith
Referees:
(Finland) Mikko Kaukokari
(Switzerland) Michael Tscherrig
Linesmen:
(Finland) Lauri Nikulainen
(Russia) Dmitri Shishlo

Brisson (Knies) (PP) – 10:38	1–0
Cates (Farrell, Meyers) – 25:32	2–0
O'Neill (Miele, Faber) – 31:13	3–0
Farrell (Abruzzese) – 38:07	4–0
Farrell (Kampfer, Meyers) – 41:06	5–0
Meyers (Farrell) – 50:19	6–0
Beniers (Abruzzese, Cooper) – 52:00	7–0
Farrell (Abdelkader, Helleson) (PP) – 58:27	8–0

10 min
Penalties
10 min
55
Shots
29

February 12, 2022; 16:40 v	Germany	3–2 (2–0, 1–1, 0–1)	China	Beijing National Indoor Stadium, Beijing; Attendance: 804

Game reference

Mathias Niederberger
Goalies
Jeremy Smith
Referees:
(United States) Stephen Reneau
(Belarus) Maxim Sidorenko
Linesmen:
(United States) Brian Oliver
(Czech Republic) Jiří Ondráček

Brandt – 13:33	1–0
Holzer (Kahun) – 16:24	2–0
Kahun (Müller, Rieder) – 24:41	3–0
	3–1	39:14 – Foo (Chelios, Sproul)
	3–2	49:00 – Wong (Yip, Sproul) (PP)

12 min
Penalties
6 min
38
Shots
16

February 13, 2022; 21:10 v	China	0–5 (0–3, 0–1, 0–1)	Canada	Beijing National Indoor Stadium, Beijing; Attendance: 904

Game reference

Paris O'Brien
Goalies
Matt Tomkins
Referees:
(Latvia) Andris Ansons
(United States) Andrew Bruggeman
Linesmen:
(Czech Republic) Daniel Hynek
(Russia) Gleb Lazarev

0–1	02:09 – Street (Johnson, O'Dell)
0–2	06:44 – Tambellini (Grant, Wotherspoon)
0–3	10:06 – O'Dell (Ho-Sang, Wotherspoon)
0–4	38:03 – Johnson (Demers, Weal)
0–5	46:23 – Knight (Power, Ho-Sang) (PP)

10 min
Penalties
10 min
26
Shots
44

Playoffs

February 15, 2022; 21:10 v	Canada	7–2 (2–1, 3–1, 2–0)	China	Beijing National Indoor Stadium, Beijing; Attendance: 994

Game reference

Matt Tomkins
Goalies
Jeremy Smith
Paris O'Brien
Referees:
(Switzerland) Michael Tscherrig
(Finland) Kristian Vikman
Linesmen:
(Switzerland) David Obwegeser
(Czech Republic) Jiří Ondráček

Weal (Tambellini, Noreau) (PP) – 06:57	1–0
Weal (Staal, Tambellini) (PP2) – 09:55	2–0
	2–1	15:32 – Kane (Werek)
Tambellini (Noreau, Weal) (PP) – 26:36	3–1
Tambellini (PS) – 28:39	4–1
O'Dell (Demers, Johnson) – 32:05	5–1
	5–2	38:59 – Kane (Lockhart, Chelios) (PP2)
Staal (McTavish, McBain) – 55:55	6–2
McBain (Noreau, Tambellini) (PP) – 58:19	7–2

15 min
Penalties
18 min
45
Shots
29

=== Women's tournament ===
China women's national ice hockey team qualified as the host.

Team roster

The roster was announced on 28 January 2022.

Head coach : (United States) Brian Idalski

No.	Pos.	Names	Height	Weight	Birthdate	Team
2	D	Yu Baiwei	1.66 m (5 ft 5 in)	66 kg (146 lb)	17 July 1988 (aged 33)	(China) KRS Vanke Rays
5	D	Camryn Wong	1.62 m (5 ft 4 in)	61 kg (134 lb)	5 September 2000 (aged 21)	(China) KRS Vanke Rays
7	F	Zhang Mengying	1.70 m (5 ft 7 in)	68 kg (150 lb)	22 December 1993 (aged 28)	(China) KRS Vanke Rays
8	F	Leah Lum	1.65 m (5 ft 5 in)	64 kg (141 lb)	12 May 1996 (aged 25)	(China) KRS Vanke Rays
10	F	He Xin	1.68 m (5 ft 6 in)	58 kg (128 lb)	24 July 1996 (aged 25)	(China) KRS Vanke Rays
15	F	Maddie Woo	1.72 m (5 ft 8 in)	69 kg (152 lb)	24 September 1994 (aged 27)	(China) KRS Vanke Rays
17	F	Kassy Betinol	1.62 m (5 ft 4 in)	67 kg (148 lb)	14 June 2001 (aged 20)	(China) KRS Vanke Rays
19	F	Taylor Lum	1.60 m (5 ft 3 in)	61 kg (134 lb)	1 April 2002 (aged 19)	(China) KRS Vanke Rays
23	F	Fang Xin	1.70 m (5 ft 7 in)	54 kg (119 lb)	10 May 1994 (aged 27)	(China) KRS Vanke Rays
24	G	Wang Yuqing	1.69 m (5 ft 7 in)	59 kg (130 lb)	6 May 1994 (aged 27)	(China) KRS Vanke Rays
26	F	Guan Yingying	1.67 m (5 ft 6 in)	62 kg (137 lb)	13 September 1995 (aged 26)	(China) KRS Vanke Rays
28	D	Anna Fairman	1.69 m (5 ft 7 in)	62 kg (137 lb)	13 October 2000 (aged 21)	(China) KRS Vanke Rays
33	G	Kimberly Newell	1.75 m (5 ft 9 in)	65 kg (143 lb)	4 October 1995 (aged 26)	(China) KRS Vanke Rays
34	F	Hannah Miller	1.75 m (5 ft 9 in)	75 kg (165 lb)	16 February 1996 (aged 25)	(China) KRS Vanke Rays
44	F	Rebekah Kolstad	1.78 m (5 ft 10 in)	84 kg (185 lb)	21 January 1997 (aged 25)	(China) KRS Vanke Rays
49	D	Jessica Wong	1.70 m (5 ft 7 in)	67 kg (148 lb)	29 March 1991 (aged 30)	(China) KRS Vanke Rays
51	F	Anna Segedi	1.65 m (5 ft 5 in)	63 kg (139 lb)	20 December 2000 (aged 21)	(China) KRS Vanke Rays
66	D	Li Qianhua	1.65 m (5 ft 5 in)	65 kg (143 lb)	6 June 2002 (aged 19)	(China) KRS Vanke Rays
88	G	Tia Chan	1.67 m (5 ft 6 in)	68 kg (150 lb)	3 September 2002 (aged 19)	(China) KRS Vanke Rays
91	F	Rachel Llanes	1.60 m (5 ft 3 in)	58 kg (128 lb)	29 April 1991 (aged 30)	(China) KRS Vanke Rays
93	D	Liu Zhixin	1.79 m (5 ft 10 in)	78 kg (172 lb)	25 April 1993 (aged 28)	(China) KRS Vanke Rays
97	D	Zhao Qinan	1.70 m (5 ft 7 in)	60 kg (130 lb)	29 September 1997 (aged 24)	(China) KRS Vanke Rays
98	F	Zhu Rui	1.62 m (5 ft 4 in)	58 kg (128 lb)	23 April 1998 (aged 23)	(China) KRS Vanke Rays

Group play

Pos	Team	Pld	W	OTW	OTL	L	GF	GA	GD	Pts	Qualification
1	Japan	4	2	1	1	0	13	7	+6	9	Quarterfinals
2	Czech Republic	4	2	0	1	1	10	8	+2	7	Quarterfinals
3	Sweden	4	2	0	0	2	7	8	−1	6	Quarterfinals
4	China (H)	4	1	1	0	2	7	7	0	5	Eliminated
5	Denmark	4	1	0	0	3	7	14	−7	3	Eliminated

Source: IIHF
Rules for classification: Tiebreakers
(H) Host

3 February 2022; 12:10 v	Czech Republic	3–1 (1–0, 1–1, 1–0)	China	Wukesong Arena, Beijing; Attendance: 499

Game reference

Klára Peslarová
Goalies
Tia Chan
Referees:
(Germany) Tijana Haack
(Finland) Anniina Nurmi
Linesmen:
(Sweden) Anna Hammar
(Austria) Julia Kainberger

Radová (Vanišová, Mrázová) – 10:38	1–0
Křížová (Neubauerová, Čajanová) – 23:57	2–0
	2–1	29:02 – Miller (Lum, Wong) (PP)
Pejzlová (Horálková) – 46:27	3–1

4 min
Penalties
6 min
36
Shots
14

4 February 2022; 12:10 v	Denmark	1–3 (1–0, 0–1, 0–2)	China	Wukesong Arena, Beijing; Attendance: 580

Game reference

Cassandra Repstock-Romme
Goalies
Kimberly Newell
Referees:
(Russia) Daria Ermak
(United States) Chelsea Rapin
Linesmen:
(Sweden) Veronica Lovensnö
(Finland) Linnea Sainio

Frandsen (N. Jensen, Glud) – 08:06	1–0
	1–1	36:46 – Lum (Yu, Wong)
	1–2	59:10 – Llanes (Lum)
	1–3	59:28 – Lum (ENG)

6 min
Penalties
6 min
23
Shots
32

6 February 2022; 16:40 v	China	2–1 GWS (0–1, 0–0, 1–0) (OT: 0–0) (SO: 1–0)	Japan	Wukesong Arena, Beijing; Attendance: 506

Game reference
Kimberly Newell	Goalies	Nana Fujimoto	Referees: (Germany) Tijana Haack (Finland) Anniina Nurmi; Linesmen: (Finland) Jenni Heikkinen (Austria) Julia Kainberger
/ 0–1 / 18:02 – Hosoyamada (Koike, Osawa) (PP); Woo (Kolstad) – 41:06 / 1–1			Referees: (Germany) Tijana Haack (Finland) Anniina Nurmi; Linesmen: (Finland) Jenni Heikkinen (Austria) Julia Kainberger
Lum (miss); Llanes (miss); Segedi (miss); Miller	Shootout	(miss) Kubo; (miss) Shiga; (miss) Ukita; (miss) H. Toko; (miss) A. Toko	Referees: (Germany) Tijana Haack (Finland) Anniina Nurmi; Linesmen: (Finland) Jenni Heikkinen (Austria) Julia Kainberger
6 min	Penalties	0 min	Referees: (Germany) Tijana Haack (Finland) Anniina Nurmi; Linesmen: (Finland) Jenni Heikkinen (Austria) Julia Kainberger
30	Shots	33	Referees: (Germany) Tijana Haack (Finland) Anniina Nurmi; Linesmen: (Finland) Jenni Heikkinen (Austria) Julia Kainberger

7 February 2022; 21:10 v	China	1–2 (1–0, 0–2, 0–0)	Sweden	Wukesong Arena, Beijing; Attendance: 588

Game reference

Kimberly Newell
Goalies
Emma Söderberg
Referees:
(Finland) Anniina Nurmi
(Switzerland) Anna Wiegand
Linesmen:
(Finland) Jenni Heikkinen
(Austria) Julia Kainberger

Betinol (Lum) – 05:16	1–0
	1–1	25:14 – Wikner-Zienkiewicz (PS)
	1–2	26:39 – Bouveng (Nylén Persson, Waxin)

2 min
Penalties
8 min
33
Shots
33

== Luge ==
Singles

Athlete	Event	Run 1		Run 2		Run 3		Run 4		Total	
Athlete	Event	Time	Rank	Time	Rank	Time	Rank	Time	Rank	Time	Rank
Fan Duoyao	Men's	58.848	23	58.883	21	58.895	25	Did not advance		2:56.626	24
Wang Peixuan	Women's	1:00.986	29	1:00.391	28	1:00.025	28	Did not advance		3:01.402	29

Doubles

Athlete	Event	Run 1		Run 2		Total	
Athlete	Event	Time	Rank	Time	Rank	Time	Rank
Huang Yebo; Peng Junyue	Doubles	1:00.732	17	1:00.840	17	2:01.572	17

Team relay

Athlete	Event	Women's singles		Men's singles		Doubles		Total	
Athlete	Event	Time	Rank	Time	Rank	Time	Rank	Time	Rank
Wang Peixuan; Fan Duoyao; Huang Yebo / Peng Junyue	Team relay	1:01.947	13	1:03.467	11	1:04.768	13	3:10.182	12

== Nordic combined ==
As host country, China qualified 1 Nordic combined athlete, and this is the country's debut in the competitions

Athlete	Event	Ski jumping			Cross-country		Total	
Athlete	Event	Distance	Points	Rank	Time	Rank	Time	Rank
Zhao Jiawen	Individual normal hill/10 km	81.0	59.0	42	28:33.8	42	33:29.8	43
Zhao Jiawen	Individual large hill/10 km	93.0	32.7	46	29:33.1	45	36:41.1	47
Zhao Zihe; Zhao Jiawen; Guo Yuhao; Fan Haibin	Team large hill/4 × 5 km	379.5	184.7	10	58:07.1	10	1:04:35.1	10

== Short track speed skating ==
China qualified all three relays and the maximum of five athletes in each gender.

Men

Athlete	Event	Heat		Quarterfinal		Semifinal		Final	
Athlete	Event	Time	Rank	Time	Rank	Time	Rank	Time	Rank
Ren Ziwei	500 m	40.669	1 Q	40.714	3	Did not advance			11
Sun Long	500 m	42.871	3 ADV	40.779	4	Did not advance			15
Wu Dajing	500 m	40.230	1 Q	40.528	1 Q	40.478	3 FB	41.157	6
Li Wenlong	1000 m	1:23.140	3 q	1:30.550	2 Q	1:26.722	2 QA	1:29.917	2nd place, silver medalist(s)
Ren Ziwei	1000 m	1:23.772	1 Q	1:34.211	2 Q	1:26.576	1 QA	1:26.768	1st place, gold medalist(s)
Wu Dajing	1000 m	1:23.927	1 Q	1:33.302	2 Q	1:23.928	2 QA	1:42.937	4
Sun Long	1500 m	—N/a		2:19.244	4	Did not advance			25
Ren Ziwei	1500 m	—N/a		2:15.084	1 Q	PEN		Did not advance	21
Zhang Tianyi	1500 m	—N/a		–	6	Did not advance			33
Li Wenlong; Ren Ziwei; Sun Long; Wu Dajing	5000 m relay	—N/a				6:51.040	4 ADVA	6:51.654	5

Women

Athlete	Event	Heat		Quarterfinal		Semifinal		Final	
Athlete	Event	Time	Rank	Time	Rank	Time	Rank	Time	Rank
Fan Kexin	500 m	43.275	1 Q	1:03.594	3	Did not advance			11
Qu Chunyu	500 m	42.691	2 Q	43.029	2 Q	PEN		Did not advance	10
Zhang Yuting	500 m	43.233	2 Q	54.211	3 ADV	43.196	2 QA	42.803	4
Han Yutong	1000 m	1:27.401	2 Q	1:31.638	5	Did not advance			18
Qu Chunyu	1000 m	1:30.342	1 Q	1:28.355	4	Did not advance			13
Zhang Chutong	1000 m	1:27.910	3 q	1:29.755	4	Did not advance			15
Han Yutong	1500 m	—N/a		2:21.191	3 Q	2:17.112	2 FA	2:19.060	7
Zhang Chutong	1500 m	—N/a		2:19.839	4 q	2:26.717	7	Did not advance	20
Zhang Yuting	1500 m	—N/a		2:22.161	3 Q	2:18.741	6	Did not advance	17
Fan Kexin; Han Yutong; Qu Chunyu; Zhang Yuting	3000 m relay	—N/a				4:04.383	2 FA	4:03.863	3rd place, bronze medalist(s)

Mixed

Athlete	Event	Quarterfinal		Semifinal		Final	
Athlete	Event	Time	Rank	Time	Rank	Time	Rank
Qu Chunyu; Fan Kexin; Wu Dajing; Ren Ziwei; Zhang Yuting	2000 m relay	2:37.535	1 Q	2:38.783	2 FA	2:37.348	1st place, gold medalist(s)

Qualification legend: FA - Qualify to medal final; FB - Qualify to consolation final

== Skeleton ==
Athlete	Event	Run 1		Run 2		Run 3		Run 4		Total	
Athlete	Event	Time	Rank	Time	Rank	Time	Rank	Time	Rank	Time	Rank
Yan Wengang	Men's	1:00.43	3	1:00.65	4	1:00.54	6	1:00.15	1	4:01.77	3rd place, bronze medalist(s)
Yin Zheng	Men's	1:00.74	7	1:00.71	5	1:00.40	4	1:00.28	2	4:02.13	5
Li Yuxi	Women's	1:02.64	14	1:02.62	9	1:02.39	12	1:02.94	19	4:10.59	14
Zhao Dan	Women's	1:02.26	3	1:02.40	5	1:02.53	16	1:02.33	9	4:09.52	9

== Ski jumping ==
Men

Athlete	Event	Qualification			First round			Final			Total	
Athlete	Event	Distance	Points	Rank	Distance	Points	Rank	Distance	Points	Rank	Points	Rank
Song Qiwu	Normal hill	61.5	24.3	53	Did not advance							
Song Qiwu	Large hill	94.5	50.7	55	Did not advance							
MLyu Yixin; Song Qiwu; Zhen Weijie; Zhou Xiaoyang	Team large hill	—N/a			346.0	115.0	11	Did not advance				

Women

Athlete	Event	First round			Final			Total	
Athlete	Event	Distance	Points	Rank	Distance	Points	Rank	Points	Rank
Dong Bing	Normal hill	73.0	57.3	31	Did not advance			57.3	31
Peng Qingyue	Normal hill	63.5	31.3	38	Did not advance			31.3	38

Mixed

Athlete	Event	First round			Final			Total	
Athlete	Event	Distance	Points	Rank	Distance	Points	Rank	Points	Rank
Dong Bing; Peng Qingyue; Song Qiwu; Zhao Jiawen	Mixed team	286.5	229.8	10	Did not advance				

== Snowboarding ==
Freestyle
Men

Athlete	Event	Qualification					Final				
Athlete	Event	Run 1	Run 2	Run 3	Best	Rank	Run 1	Run 2	Run 3	Best	Rank
Su Yiming	Big air	92.50	62.75	~~28.00~~	155.25	5 Q	89.50	93.00	~~33.00~~	182.50	1st place, gold medalist(s)
Fan Xiaobing	Halfpipe	39.00	44.00	—N/a	44.00	16	Did not advance				
Gao Hongbo	Halfpipe	15.00	DNS	—N/a	15.00	25	Did not advance				
Gu Ao	Halfpipe	50.25	58.50	—N/a	58.50	14	Did not advance				
Wang Ziyang	Halfpipe	20.25	7.50	—N/a	20.25	21	Did not advance				
Su Yiming	Slopestyle	86.80	41.93	—N/a	86.80	1 Q	78.38	88.70	66.58	88.70	2nd place, silver medalist(s)

Women

Athlete	Event	Qualification					Final				
Athlete	Event	Run 1	Run 2	Run 3	Best	Rank	Run 1	Run 2	Run 3	Best	Rank
Rong Ge	Big air	~~10.75~~	64.00	65.75	129.75	9 Q	~~29.00~~	85.75	74.25	160.00	5
Cai Xuetong	Halfpipe	83.25	55.50	—N/a	83.25	3 Q	81.25	64.50	75.00	81.25	4
Liu Jiayu	Halfpipe	15.25	72.25	—N/a	72.25	7 Q	11.25	4.75	73.50	73.50	8
Qiu Leng	Halfpipe	63.50	66.25	—N/a	66.25	12 Q	53.75	9.50	18.75	53.75	12
Wu Shaotong	Halfpipe	10.25	16.75	—N/a	16.75	22	Did not advance				
Rong Ge	Slopestyle	29.36	13.01	—N/a	29.36	25	Did not advance				

Parallel

Athlete	Event	Qualification		Round of 16	Quarterfinal	Semifinal	Final	
Athlete	Event	Time	Rank	Opposition Time	Opposition Time	Opposition Time	Opposition Time	Rank
Bi Ye	Men's giant slalom	1:23.53	22	Did not advance				
Gong Naiying	Women's giant slalom	1:29.31	19	Did not advance				
Zang Ruxin	Women's giant slalom	1:37.48	25	Did not advance				

Snowboard cross

Athlete	Event	Seeding		1/8 final	Quarterfinal	Semifinal	Final	
Athlete	Event	Time	Rank	Position	Position	Position	Position	Rank
Feng He	Women's	1:31.25	30	4	Did not advance			30

Qualification legend: FA – Qualify to medal round; FB – Qualify to consolation round

== Speed skating ==
China qualified 6 men and 8 women in the speed skating event.

Men

Athlete	Event	Time	Rank
Gao Tingyu	500 m	34.32	1st place, gold medalist(s)
Yang Tao	500 m	35.162	21
Lian Ziwen	1000 m	1:09.93	19
Ning Zhongyan	1000 m	1:08.60	5
Lian Ziwen	1500 m	1:49.15	27
Ning Zhongyan	1500 m	1:45.28	7
Wang Haotian	1500 m	1:47.13	20

Women

Athlete	Event	Time	Rank
Jin Jingzhu	500 m	37.88	12
Tian Ruining	500 m	37.982	14
Jin Jingzhu	1000 m	1:16.90	22
Li Qishi	1000 m	1:15.99	14
Yin Qi	1000 m	1:16.00	15
Adake Ahenaer	1500 m	1:58.59	17
Han Mei	1500 m	1:56.08	11
Yin Qi	1500 m	1:57.00	15
Adake Ahenaer	3000 m	4:12.28	17
Han Mei	3000 m	4:07.74	15
Han Mei	5000 m	7:08.37	11

Mass start

Athlete	Event	Semifinal			Final		
Athlete	Event	Points	Time	Rank	Points	Time	Rank
Ning Zhongyan	Men's	20	7:56.75	3	0	7:48.07	12
Wang Haotian	Men's	0	7:46.30	12	Did not advance		23
Guo Dan	Women's	21	8:34.39	3	0	8:18.61	13
Li Qishi	Women's	23	8:29.01	3	DQ		16

Team pursuit

Athlete	Event	Quarterfinal		Semifinal		Final	
Athlete	Event	Opposition Time	Rank	Opposition Time	Rank	Opposition Time	Rank
Lian Ziwen; Wang Haotian; Xu Fu	Men's	ROC; L 3:52.25	8 FD	Did not advance		Final D Italy; L 3:53.58	8
Han Mei; Ahenaer Adake; Li Qishi	Women's	Japan; L3:00.58	5 FC	Did not advance		Final C Norway; W 2:58.33	5
