= Cross-country skiing at the 2022 Winter Olympics – Men's 50 kilometre freestyle =

Men's 50 kilometre freestyle at the XXIV Olympic Winter Games
- Cross-country skiing
- Venue: Kuyangshu Nordic Center and Biathlon Center, Taizicheng
- Date: 19 February 2022
- Competitors: 60 from 32 nations
- Winning time: 1:11:32.7

Medalists
1st place, gold medalist(s)		Alexander Bolshunov	ROC
2nd place, silver medalist(s)		Ivan Yakimushkin	ROC
3rd place, bronze medalist(s)		Simen Hegstad Krüger	Norway

The men's 50 kilometre freestyle competition in cross-country skiing at the 2022 Winter Olympics was held on 19 February, at the Kuyangshu Nordic Center and Biathlon Center in Taizicheng. Alexander Bolshunov, representing the Russian Olympic Committee, won the event, and Ivan Yakimushkin, also of ROC, won silver, his first Olympic medal. Simen Hegstad Krüger of Norway won the bronze medal, competing in his first and only race at these Games after an illness. Bolshunov became only the second skier who won 30 km and 50 km at the same Olympics, after Russian Nikolay Zimyatov accomplished this in 1980.

This event was delayed by an hour and shortened to 28.4 km (17.65 mi) due to high winds and freezing temperature. Temperature was −9 °F (−23 °C) or −25 °F (−32 °C) with windchill, while wind gusts varied within 17-30 mph (27-48 km/h), according to the local weather. Athletes complained that the weather conditions were too severe, but many also criticized the decision to shorten the race. 28th place finisher, Finland’s Remi Lindholm, suffered a frozen penis as a result of the extreme conditions. The decision means that the gap between Olympic men's 50 km freestyle races will be at least sixteen years from Sochi 2014 to the 2030 Olympics. It also caused the rare occurrence that the women's 30-kilometre race, held the following day, was the longest cross-country skiing race in the Beijing Olympics both in course length and duration, despite women's distance races usually being significantly shorter than men's.

== Summary ==
The 50 km (31.07 mi) distance event alternates between classical style and free style skiing in succeeding Olympics, and in 2022 it was the free style event. The defending champion was Iivo Niskanen, who declined to compete due to favoring classical style. The silver medalist, Alexander Bolshunov, qualified for the Olympics but the bronze medalist, Andrey Larkov, did not. The overall leader of the 2021–22 FIS Cross-Country World Cup before the Olympics was Johannes Høsflot Klæbo, and the distance leader was Bolshunov. The season was dominated by the Norwegians and Russians, who together took 20 podium places in distance events out of 24, and three more podium places were taken by Niskanen. Emil Iversen was the 2021 World Champion in 50 km classical.

At 15 km (9.32 mi), a group of 14 skiers were within 6 seconds of each other and had a gap of 6 seconds to the next pursuer and almost half a minute to the rest of the skiers in the race. This group included all four ROC skiers. At 21 km (13.05 mi), only 10 skiers remained in the leading group. Even when they were entering the stadium, Bolshunov, Artem Maltsev, Yakimushkin, Sjur Røthe, and Krueger were skiing in a group. Bolshunov was the fastest at the finish line.

== Results ==
The race was scheduled for 14:00, but the start was delayed to 15:00 and the race distance shortened to 28.4 km due to inclement weather.

Rank	Bib	Name	Country	Time	Deficit
1st place, gold medalist(s)	2	Alexander Bolshunov	ROC	1:11:32.7	—
2nd place, silver medalist(s)	3	Ivan Yakimushkin	ROC	1:11:38.2	+5.5
3rd place, bronze medalist(s)	4	Simen Hegstad Krüger	Norway	1:11:39.7	+7.0
4	5	Artem Maltsev	ROC	1:11:43.4	+10.7
5	7	Sjur Røthe	Norway	1:11:48.5	+15.8
6	6	Denis Spitsov	ROC	1:11:58.9	+26.2
7	14	Clément Parisse	France	1:12:01.5	+28.8
8	27	Scott Patterson	United States	1:12:06.6	+33.9
9	22	William Poromaa	Sweden	1:12:29.1	+56.4
10	15	Maurice Manificat	France	1:12:30.3	+57.6
11	20	Roman Furger	Switzerland	1:13:24.8	+1:52.1
12	12	Andrew Musgrave	Great Britain	1:13:29.3	+1:56.6
13	8	Hans Christer Holund	Norway	1:13:30.2	+1:57.5
14	17	Dario Cologna	Switzerland	1:13:31.1	+1:58.4
15	31	Jules Lapierre	France	1:13:50.3	+2:17.6
16	18	Jens Burman	Sweden	1:14:22.3	+2:49.6
17	25	Jason Rüesch	Switzerland	1:14:48.4	+3:15.7
18	28	Giandomenico Salvadori	Italy	1:14:49.1	+3:16.4
19	21	Perttu Hyvärinen	Finland	1:14:49.5	+3:16.8
20	16	Jonas Dobler	Germany	1:14:50.0	+3:17.3
21	33	Imanol Rojo	Spain	1:14:50.5	+3:17.8
22	34	Candide Pralong	Switzerland	1:14:50.5	+3:17.8
23	38	Snorri Einarsson	Iceland	1:14:51.6	+3:18.9
24	26	Naoto Baba	Japan	1:14:52.7	+3:20.0
25	24	Irineu Esteve Altimiras	Andorra	1:15:09.8	+3:37.1
26	19	Florian Notz	Germany	1:15:32.2	+3:59.5
27	46	Olivier Léveillé	Canada	1:15:54.3	+4:21.6
28	37	Remi Lindholm	Finland	1:15:55.6	+4:22.9
29	30	Thomas Maloney Westgård	Ireland	1:15:59.0	+4:26.3
30	35	Dominik Bury	Poland	1:16:01.0	+4:28.3
31	10	Friedrich Moch	Germany	1:16:03.6	+4:30.9
32	32	Paolo Ventura	Italy	1:16:05.4	+4:32.7
33	11	Lucas Bögl	Germany	1:16:11.5	+4:38.8
34	23	Adrien Backscheider	France	1:16:16.6	+4:43.9
35	42	Rémi Drolet	Canada	1:16:27.1	+4:54.4
36	47	Alvar Johannes Alev	Estonia	1:16:28.4	+4:55.7
37	36	Petr Knop	Czech Republic	1:16:35.0	+5:02.3
38	13	Calle Halfvarsson	Sweden	1:16:47.6	+5:14.9
39	29	Leo Johansson	Sweden	1:17:16.5	+5:43.8
40	44	Ján Koristek	Slovakia	1:17:26.0	+5:53.3
41	39	Chen Degen	China	1:18:14.1	+6:41.4
42	40	Adam Fellner	Czech Republic	1:18:14.3	+6:41.6
43	43	Yevgeniy Velichko	Kazakhstan	1:18:43.8	+7:11.1
44	41	Raimo Vīgants	Latvia	1:18:55.2	+7:22.5
45	51	Hadesi Badelihan	China	1:19:45.9	+8:13.2
46	45	Wang Qiang	China	1:19:53.5	+8:20.8
47	56	Thibaut de Marre	Belgium	1:19:53.8	+8:21.1
48	50	Liu Rongsheng	China	1:19:58.5	+8:25.8
49	61	Mark Chanloung	Thailand	1:20:11.5	+8:38.8
50	48	Mateusz Haratyk	Poland	1:20:24.0	+8:51.3
51	58	Seve de Campo	Australia	1:21:02.5	+9:29.8
52	49	Strahinja Erić	Bosnia and Herzegovina	1:21:07.6	+9:34.9
53	55	Phillip Bellingham	Australia	1:23:03.8	+11:31.1
54	54	Roberts Slotiņš	Latvia	1:24:46.4	+13:13.7
55	57	Ádám Kónya	Hungary	1:25:21.4	+13:48.7
56	53	Stavre Jada	North Macedonia	1:25:41.8	+14:09.1
57	60	Marko Skender	Croatia	1:30:34.5	+19:01.8
58	59	Manex Silva	Brazil	1:33:11.8	+21:39.1
59	52	Apostolos Angelis	Greece	1:34:04.2	+22:31.5
	1	Johannes Høsflot Klæbo	Norway	Did not finish	
	9	Michal Novák	Czech Republic	Did not start	
