= Cross-country skiing at the 2022 Winter Olympics – Men's 30 kilometre skiathlon =

Men's 30 kilometre skiathlon at the XXIV Olympic Winter Games
- Cross-country skiing
- Venue: Kuyangshu Nordic Center and Biathlon Center, Zhangjiakou
- Date: 6 February 2022
- Competitors: 69 from 34 nations
- Winning time: 1:16:09.8

Medalists
1st place, gold medalist(s)		Alexander Bolshunov	ROC
2nd place, silver medalist(s)		Denis Spitsov	ROC
3rd place, bronze medalist(s)		Iivo Niskanen	Finland

The men's 30 kilometre skiathlon competition in cross-country skiing at the 2022 Winter Olympics was held on 6 February, at the Kuyangshu Nordic Center and Biathlon Center in Zhangjiakou. The event, with half distance classic skiing and half distance skate skiing, was won by Alexander Bolshunov, for whom this is the first Olympic gold medal. Denis Spitsov finished second and Iivo Niskanen third.

== Summary ==
The 2018 champion is Simen Hegstad Krüger who qualified for the Olympics but tested positive for COVID-19 just before the games. Even though he had no symptoms, he was not allowed to fly to China with the rest of the team and did not get a chance to defend the title. The silver medalist Martin Johnsrud Sundby and the bronze medalist Hans Christer Holund qualified as well, but Sundby was not selected for the skiathlon. The overall leader of the 2021–22 FIS Cross-Country World Cup before the Olympics was Johannes Høsflot Klæbo, and the distance leader was Alexander Bolshunov. The season was dominated by Norwegians and Russians, who together took 20 podium places in distance events out of 24, and three more podium places were taken by Iivo Niskanen. Bolshunov is the 2021 World Champion in 30 kilometre skiathlon, with Krüger and Holund being the silver and the bronze medalist, respectively.

Before the pit stop, Bolshunov and Niskanen ran away, followed by Spitsov, Holund and Pål Golberg. After the pit stop, Bolshunov ran away from Niskanen, who was caught up by Spitsov, and at 18 km Spitsov and Niskanen were already 30 seconds behind. Then Spitsov ran away from Niskanen. At 25 km, Spitsov was already almost a minute behind Bolshunov, and Niskanen almost a minute behind Spitsov, with Holund further 40 seconds behind Niskanen and visibly out of medal contention.

== Results ==
The race was started at 15:00.

Rank	Bib	Name	Country	15 km classic	Rank	Pitstop	15 km free	Rank	Finish time	Deficit
1st place, gold medalist(s)	2	Alexander Bolshunov	ROC	39:05.6	1	31.9	36:32.3	1	1:16:09.8	
2nd place, silver medalist(s)	6	Denis Spitsov	ROC	39:36.1	3	30.1	37:14.6	2	1:17:20.8	+1:11.0
3rd place, bronze medalist(s)	4	Iivo Niskanen	Finland	39:06.1	2	30.5	38:33.4	7	1:18:10.0	+2:00.2
4	8	Hans Christer Holund	Norway	39:41.8	5	32.9	38:26.0	6	1:18:40.7	+2:30.9
5	10	Pål Golberg	Norway	39:41.0	4	35.3	38:46.0	11	1:19:02.3	+2:52.5
6	26	William Poromaa	Sweden	40:13.9	8	31.5	38:18.3	3	1:19:03.7	+2:53.9
7	21	Perttu Hyvärinen	Finland	40:13.1	7	31.7	38:37.6	9	1:19:22.4	+3:12.6
8	11	Francesco De Fabiani	Italy	40:12.4	6	29.3	39:06.0	22	1:19:47.6	+3:37.8
9	5	Artem Maltsev	ROC	40:38.4	10	32.3	38:53.9	14	1:20:04.6	+3:54.8
10	18	Clément Parisse	France	41:16.0	17	29.3	38:21.7	5	1:20:07.0	+3:57.2
11	30	Scott Patterson	United States	41:17.4	19	33.7	38:18.9	4	1:20:10.0	+4:00.2
12	14	Lucas Bögl	Germany	41:05.4	15	32.5	38:34.6	8	1:20:12.5	+4:02.7
13	13	Friedrich Moch	Germany	40:46.2	12	31.7	38:58.5	19	1:20:16.4	+4:06.6
14	35	Jules Lapierre	France	41:04.5	13	32.0	38:45.3	10	1:20:21.8	+4:12.0
15	16	Jonas Baumann	Switzerland	41:05.0	14	30.9	38:56.6	17	1:20:32.5	+4:22.7
16	41	Mika Vermeulen	Austria	41:18.0	20	32.3	38:49.7	13	1:20:40.0	+4:30.2
17	15	Andrew Musgrave	Great Britain	41:16.8	18	32.7	38:57.4	18	1:20:46.9	+4:37.1
18	12	Michal Novák	Czech Republic	41:14.9	16	29.9	39:06.1	23	1:20:50.9	+4:41.1
19	24	Florian Notz	Germany	41:19.4	22	35.6	39:05.4	21	1:21:00.4	+4:50.6
20	27	Irineu Esteve Altimiras	Andorra	41:37.9	27	36.2	38:54.1	16	1:21:08.2	+4:58.4
21	37	Imanol Rojo	Spain	41:37.7	26	37.5	38:54.0	15	1:21:09.2	+4:59.4
22	39	Candide Pralong	Switzerland	41:38.6	28	31.5	39:03.5	20	1:21:13.6	+5:03.8
23	19	Maurice Manificat	France	41:53.9	33	34.2	38:49.4	12	1:21:17.5	+5:07.7
24	23	Jens Burman	Sweden	41:20.0	23	32.9	39:50.4	25	1:21:43.3	+5:33.5
25	43	Remi Lindholm	Finland	41:39.5	30	34.0	39:35.9	24	1:21:49.4	+5:39.6
26	40	Dominik Bury	Poland	42:08.2	35	34.5	39:57.9	26	1:22:40.6	+6:30.8
27	28	Jason Rüesch	Switzerland	41:40.6	31	33.2	40:27.5	27	1:22:41.3	+6:31.5
28	38	Paul Pepene	Romania	41:39.3	29	31.7	40:30.4	28	1:22:41.4	+6:31.6
29	44	Snorri Einarsson	Iceland	41:37.4	25	39.2	40:33.5	29	1:22:50.1	+6:40.3
30	17	Calle Halfvarsson	Sweden	41:18.8	21	34.5	41:03.0	34	1:22:56.3	+6:46.5
31	53	Olivier Léveillé	Canada	42:07.5	34	31.2	41:03.3	36	1:23:42.0	+7:32.2
32	34	Vitaliy Pukhkalo	Kazakhstan	41:36.8	24	36.2	41:32.1	39	1:23:45.1	+7:35.3
33	56	Alvar Johannes Alev	Estonia	42:08.8	36	33.4	41:08.3	38	1:23:50.5	+7:40.7
34	36	Paolo Ventura	Italy	42:41.0	40	32.6	40:46.8	30	1:24:00.4	+7.50.6
35	29	Naoto Baba	Japan	43:13.8	44	37.7	40:52.4	31	1:24:43.9	+8:34.1
36	3	Aleksey Chervotkin	ROC	41:41.0	32	34.0	42:44.5	46	1:24:59.5	+8:49.7
37	32	Leo Johansson	Sweden	43:21.9	46	34.7	41:03.0	34	1:24:59.6	+8:49.8
38	59	Liu Rongsheng	China	43:19.3	45	34.7	41:05.6	37	1:24:59.6	+8:49.8
39	25	Gus Schumacher	United States	42:26.3	38	31.4	42:16.6	44	1:25:14.3	+9:04.5
40	1	Johannes Høsflot Klæbo	Norway	40:42.1	11	34.0	43:59.7	49	1:25:15.8	+9:06.0
41	48	Ryo Hirose	Japan	43:04.4	43	32.2	41:41.1	40	1:25:17.7	+9:07.9
42	22	Antoine Cyr	Canada	42:27.3	39	33.5	42:25.2	45	1:25:26.0	+9:16.2
43	33	Thomas Maloney Westgård	Ireland	43:03.8	42	34.3	41:51.7	42	1:25:29.8	+9:20.0
44	42	Petr Knop	Czech Republic	44:06.8	52	35.7	40:55.9	33	1:25:38.4	+9:28.6
45	52	Ján Koristek	Slovakia	44:06.1	51	37.7	40:54.9	32	1:25:38.7	+9:28.9
46	46	Adam Fellner	Czech Republic	43:22.6	47	34.1	41:42.8	41	1:25:39.5	+9:29.7
47	57	Mikayel Mikayelyan	Armenia	42:09.7	37	35.5	43:08.5	47	1:25:53.7	+9:43.9
48	31	Giandomenico Salvadori	Italy	43:23.4	48	34.3	42:13.0	43	1:26:10.7	+10:00.9
49	54	Shang Jincai	China	43:03.2	41	36.2	43:08.8	48	1:26:48.2	+10:38.4
50	62	Hadesi Badelihan	China	44:04.2	49	34.9	Lapped			
51	58	Mateusz Haratyk	Poland	45:40.0	59	32.0	Lapped			
52	49	Raimo Vīgants	Latvia	44:05.9	50	38.3	Lapped			
53	47	Haruki Yamashita	Japan	45:06.0	57	34.9	Lapped			
54	66	Thibaut de Marre	Belgium	44:40.8	56	33.0	Lapped			
55	50	Rémi Drolet	Canada	44:39.9	55	33.5	Lapped			
56	55	Miha Ličef	Slovenia	44:39.3	54	36.6	Lapped			
57	51	Yevgeniy Velichko	Kazakhstan	44:20.9	53	38.8	Lapped			
58	64	Oleksii Krasovskyi	Ukraine	45:22.6	58	35.2	Lapped			
59	45	Chen Degen	China	45:55.6	60	40.1	Lapped			
60	70	Mark Chanloung	Thailand	47:00.0	62	33.8	Lapped			
61	67	Seve de Campo	Australia	47:05.7	63	32.7	Lapped			
62	61	Kim Min-woo	South Korea	46:24.3	61	33.8	Lapped			
63	69	Franco Dal Farra	Argentina	Lapped						
64	60	Ruslan Perekhoda	Ukraine	Lapped						
65	65	Phil Bellingham	Australia	Lapped						
66	63	Jeong Jong-won	South Korea	Lapped						
67	68	Manex Silva	Brazil	Lapped						
	9	Hugo Lapalus	France	40:25.2	9	31.4	Did not finish			
	7	Sjur Røthe	Norway	Did not finish						
	20	Jonas Dobler	Germany	Did not start						
