= Leo Johansson =

Swedish cross country skier (born 1999)

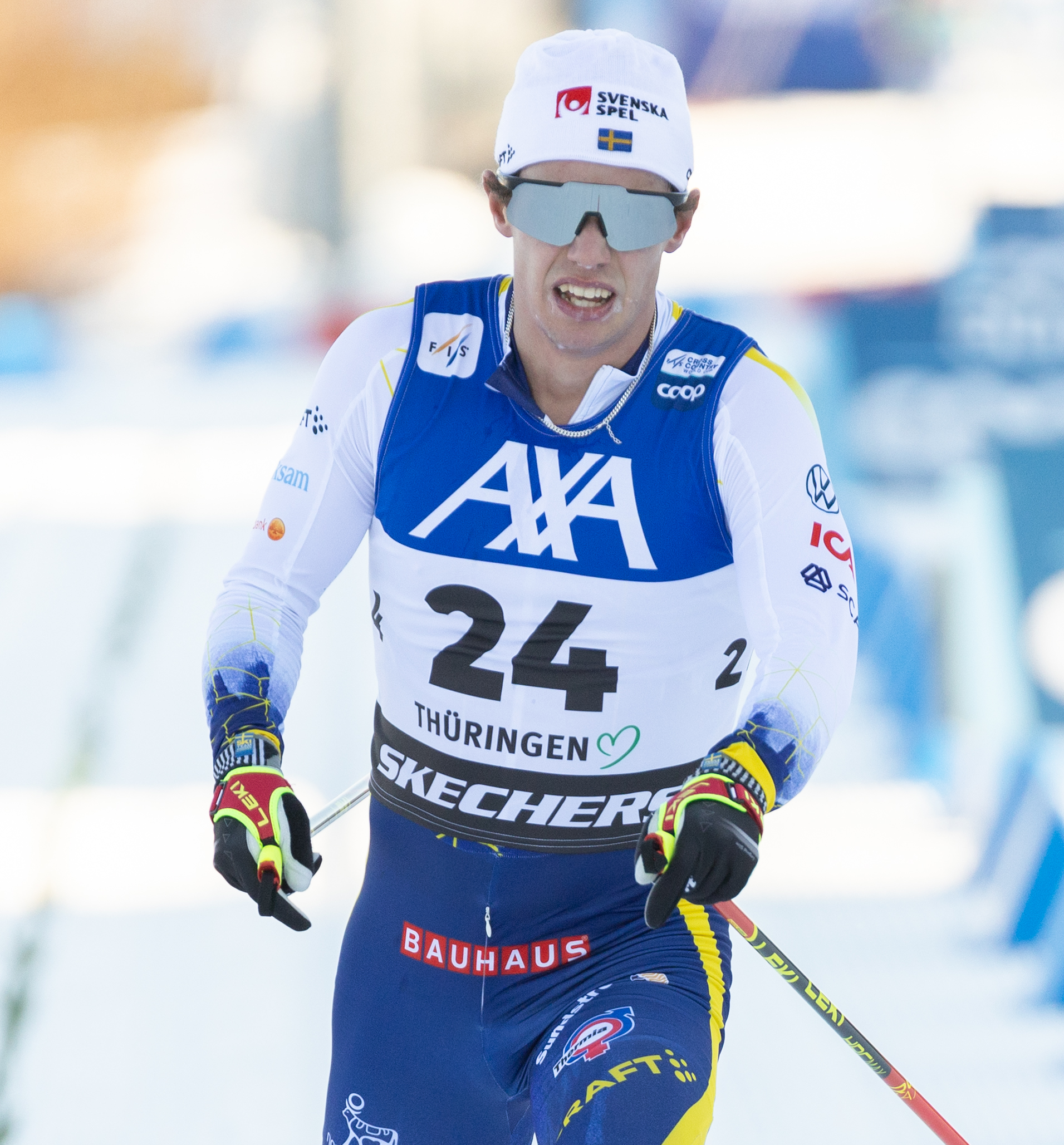

Personal information
- Full name: Leo Rickard Josef Johansson
- Nationality: Sweden
- Born: 30 June 1999 (age 27) Skillingaryd, Sweden

Sport
- Sport: Skiing
- Club: Falun-Borlänge SK

World Cup career
- Seasons: 4 – (2021–present)
- Indiv. starts: 8
- Indiv. podiums: 0
- Team starts: 1
- Team podiums: 0
- Overall titles: 0 – (74th in 2022)
- Discipline titles: 0
Medal record
Men's cross-country skiing
Representing Sweden
U23 World Championships
Silver medal – second place	2022 Lygna	15 km classical
- Updated on 27 March 2022

Leo Rickard Josef Johansson (born 30 June 1999) is a Swedish cross country skier who competed at the 2022 Winter Olympics. He trains out of Falun.

== Cross-country skiing results ==
All results are sourced from the International Ski Federation (FIS).

=== Olympic Games ===
Year	Age	15 km individual	30 km skiathlon	50 km mass start	Sprint	4 × 10 km relay	Team sprint
2022	22	—	37	39^{[a]}	—	—	—

^{a} Distance reduced to 30 km due to weather conditions.

=== World Cup ===
==== Season standings ====
Season	Age	Discipline standings				Ski Tour standings	
Season	Age	Overall	Distance	Sprint	U23	Nordic Opening	Tour de Ski
2021	21	NC	NC	NC	NC	—	—
2022	22	74	42	—	11	—N/a	—
2023	23	109	61	NC	—N/a	—N/a	DNF
