= Paolo Ventura (skier) =

Italian cross country skier

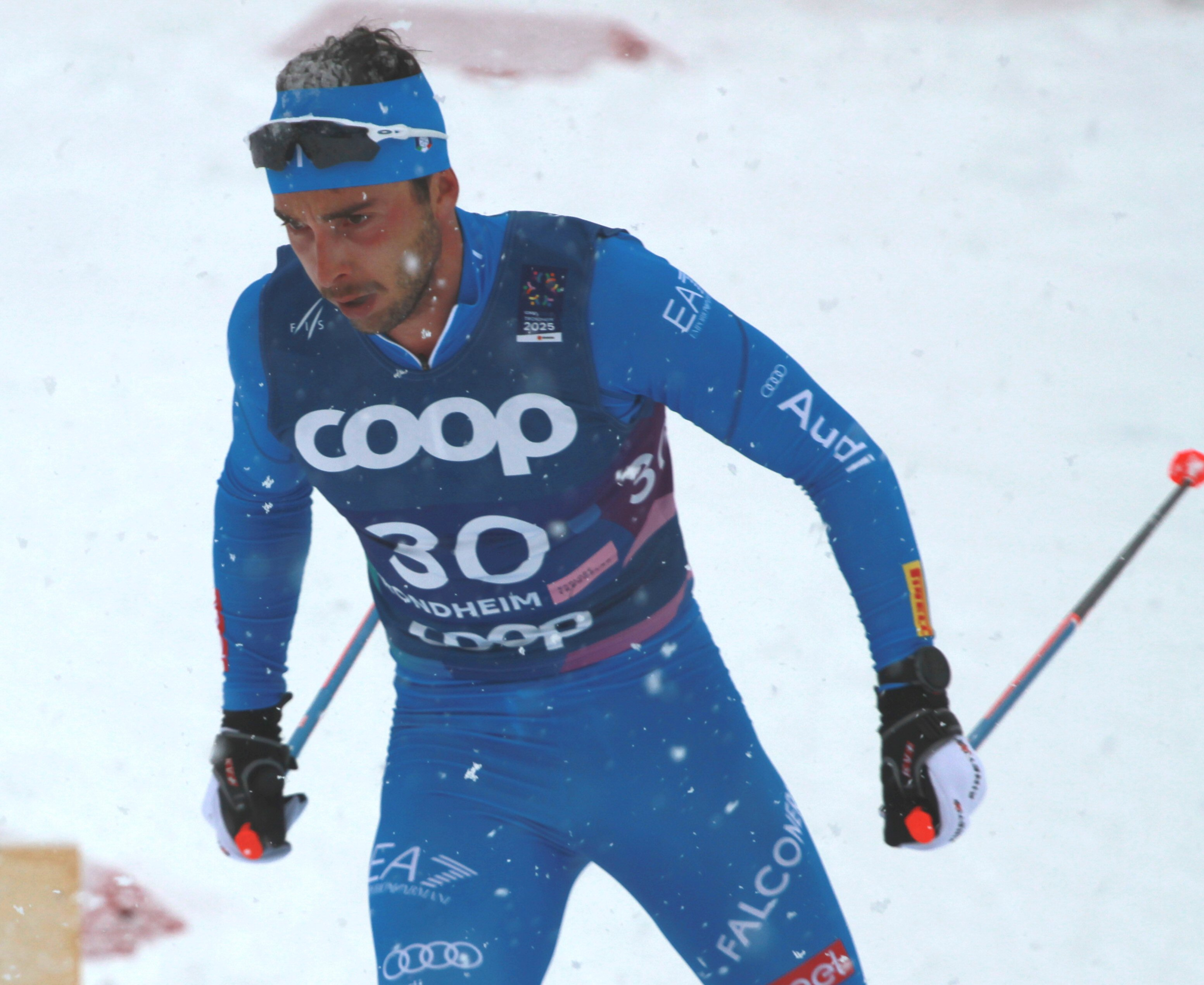

Personal information
- Nationality: Italy
- Born: 1 April 1996 (age 30) Cavalese, Italy

Sport
- Sport: Skiing
- Club: C.S. Esercito

World Cup career
- Seasons: 5 – (2019–present)
- Indiv. starts: 49
- Indiv. podiums: 0
- Team starts: 2
- Team podiums: 0
- Overall titles: 0 – (94th in 2023)
- Discipline titles: 0
- Updated on 29 March 2023

Paolo Ventura (born 1 April 1996) is an Italian cross country skier who competed at the 2022 Winter Olympics. He trains out of Tesero.

== Cross-country skiing results ==
All results are sourced from the International Ski Federation (FIS).

=== Olympic Games ===
Year	Age	15 km individual	30 km skiathlon	50 km mass start	Sprint	4 × 10 km relay	Team sprint
2022	27	34	34	32^{[a]}	—	4	4

^{a} Distance reduced to 30 km due to weather conditions.

=== World Championships ===
Year	Age	15 km individual	30 km skiathlon	50 km mass start	Sprint	4 × 10 km relay	Team sprint
2021	26	—	41	—	—	—	—
2023	28	23	DNF	—	—	9	—

=== World Cup ===
==== Season standings ====
Season	Age	Discipline standings				Ski Tour standings			
Season	Age	Overall	Distance	Sprint	U23	Nordic Opening	Tour de Ski	Ski Tour 2020	World Cup Final
2019	22	NC	—	NC	NC	—	—	—N/a	—
2020	23	125	78	NC	—N/a	—	—	42	—N/a
2021	24	95	77	NC	—N/a	—	32	—N/a	—N/a
2022	25	100	69	NC	—N/a	—N/a	38	—N/a	—N/a
2023	26	94	72	NC	—N/a	—N/a	30	—N/a	—N/a
