= Candide Pralong =

Swiss cross-country skier

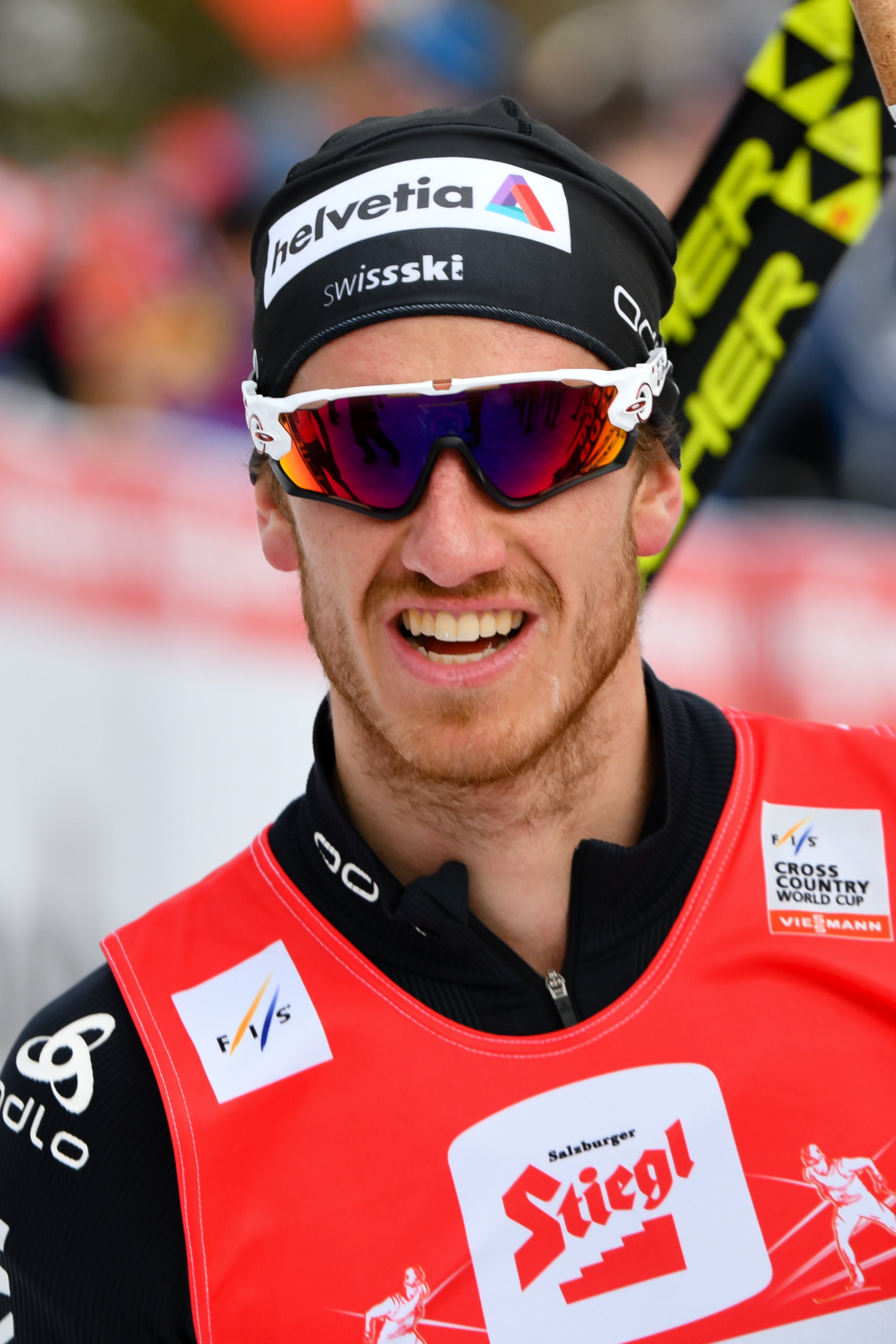
- Pralong in 2018

Personal information
- Nationality: Switzerland
- Born: 24 September 1990 (age 35)

Sport
- Sport: Skiing
- Club: Val Ferret

World Cup career
- Seasons: 10 – (2011–2012, 2014–2016, 2018, 2020–present)
- Indiv. starts: 67
- Indiv. podiums: 0
- Team starts: 3
- Team podiums: 0
- Overall titles: 0 – (60th in 2023)
- Discipline titles: 0
- Updated on 29 March 2023

Candide Pralong (born 24 September 1990) is a Swiss cross-country skier who competes internationally.

He represented Switzerland at the 2018 and 2022 Olympics.

== Cross-country skiing results ==
All results are sourced from the International Ski Federation (FIS).

=== Olympic Games ===
Year	Age	15 km individual	30 km skiathlon	50 km mass start	Sprint	4 × 10 km relay	Team sprint
2018	27	50	31	31	—	—	—
2022	31	—	22	22^{[a]}	—	7	—

^{a} Distance reduced to 30 km due to weather conditions.

=== World Championships ===
Year	Age	15 km individual	30 km skiathlon	50 km mass start	Sprint	4 × 10 km relay	Team sprint
2021	30	—	30	21	—	—	—
2023	32	48	—	—	—	8	—

=== World Cup ===
==== Season standings ====
Season	Age	Discipline standings			Ski Tour standings				
Season	Age	Overall	Distance	Sprint	Nordic Opening	Tour de Ski	Ski Tour 2020	World Cup Final	Ski Tour Canada
2011	20	NC	NC	—	—	—	—N/a	—	—N/a
2012	21	NC	NC	NC	—	—	—N/a	—	—N/a
2014	23	164	106	—	—	—	—N/a	—	—N/a
2015	24	NC	NC	NC	—	—	—N/a	—N/a	—N/a
2016	25	NC	NC	NC	—	—	—N/a	—N/a	—
2018	27	98	65	NC	—	32	—N/a	—	—N/a
2020	29	NC	NC	—	—	—	—	—N/a	—N/a
2021	30	61	57	49	—	34	—N/a	—N/a	—N/a
2022	31	67	44	NC	—N/a	39	—N/a	—N/a	—N/a
2023	32	60	45	NC	—N/a	29	—N/a	—N/a	—N/a
