= Giandomenico Salvadori =

Italian cross-country skier

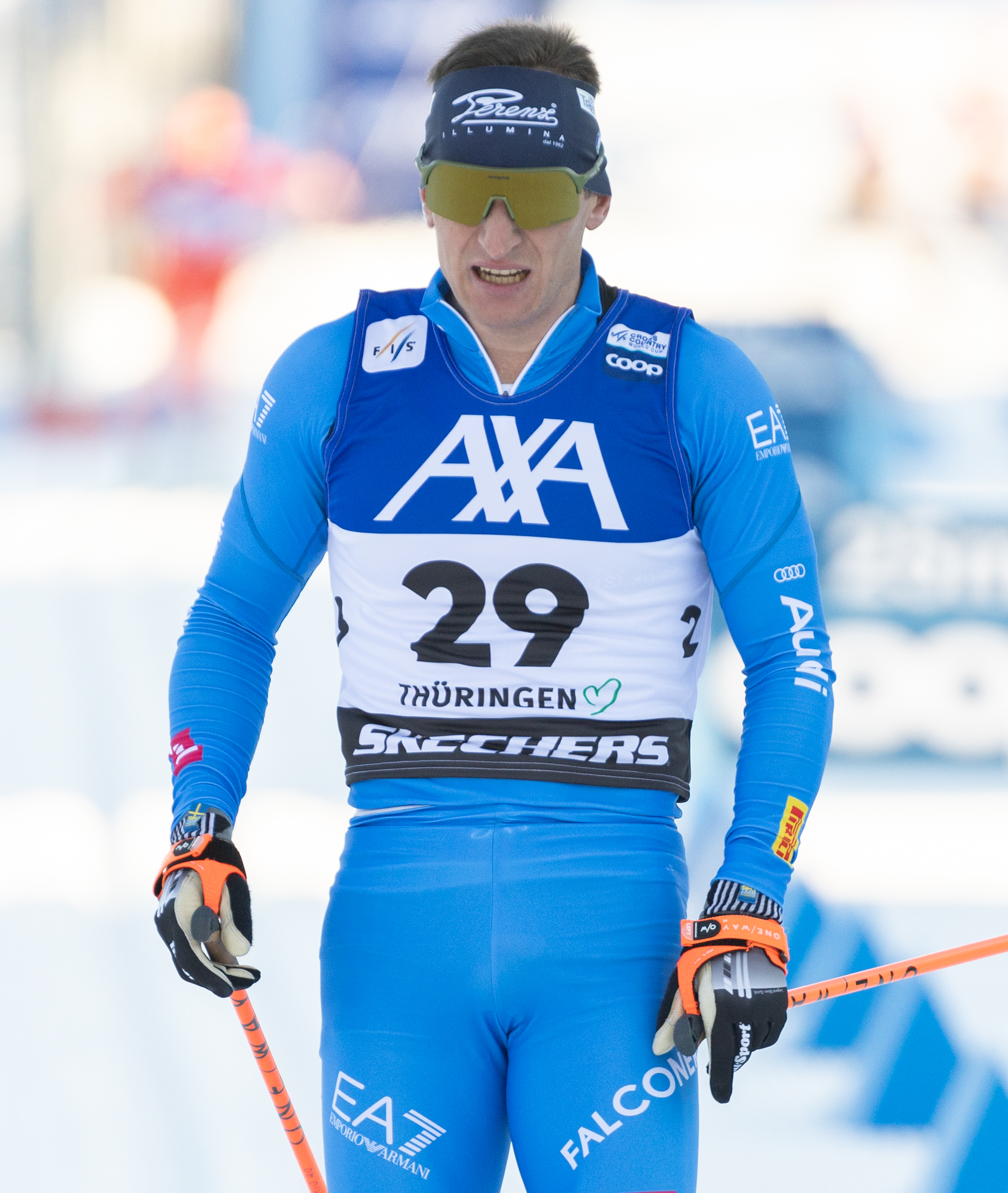
- Salvadori in 2026

Personal information
- Nationality: Italy
- Born: 8 October 1992 (age 33) Feltre, Italy

Sport
- Sport: Skiing
- Club: G.S. Fiamme Gialle

World Cup career
- Seasons: 9 – (2016–present)
- Indiv. starts: 136
- Indiv. podiums: 0
- Team starts: 5
- Team podiums: 0
- Overall titles: 0 – (51st in 2018)
- Discipline titles: 0
- Updated on 29 March 2023

Giandomenico Salvadori (born 8 October 1992) is an Italian cross-country skier who competes internationally.

He represented Italy at the 2018 Winter Olympics.

== Cross-country skiing results ==
All results are sourced from the International Ski Federation (FIS).

=== Olympic Games ===
Year	Age	15 km individual	30 km skiathlon	50 km mass start	Sprint	4 × 10 km relay	Team sprint
2018	25	—	26	16	—	7	—
2022	29	22	48	18^{[a]}	—	8	—

^{a} Distance reduced to 30 km due to weather conditions.

=== World Championships ===
Year	Age	15 km individual	30 km skiathlon	50 km mass start	Sprint	4 × 10 km relay	Team sprint
2017	24	21	10	—	—	8	—
2019	26	—	16	26	—	10	—
2021	28	DNS	24	—	—	—	—
2023	30	—	26	37	—	—	—

=== World Cup ===
==== Season standings ====
Season	Age	Discipline standings			Ski Tour standings				
Season	Age	Overall	Distance	Sprint	Nordic Opening	Tour de Ski	Ski Tour 2020	World Cup Final	Ski Tour Canada
2016	23	68	42	NC	—	27	—N/a	—N/a	39
2017	24	88	63	NC	66	28	—N/a	30	—N/a
2018	25	51	33	NC	36	DNF	—N/a	20	—N/a
2019	26	83	54	NC	48	35	—N/a	53	—N/a
2020	27	63	46	NC	53	29	37	—N/a	—N/a
2021	28	63	45	NC	36	35	—N/a	—N/a	—N/a
2022	29	59	40	NC	—N/a	30	—N/a	—N/a	—N/a
2023	30	134	79	NC	—N/a	DNF	—N/a	—N/a	—N/a
