= Xu Mingfu =

Chinese alpine skier (born 1997)

Personal information
- Born: 17 July 1997 (age 28) China

Sport
- Country: China
- Sport: Alpine skiing

Xu Mingfu (born 17 July 1997) is an alpine skier who competes for China. He competed for China at the 2022 Winter Olympics in the downhill, Super-G, giant slalom, slalom, and combined. He was the first Chinese athlete to finish a downhill alpine skiing competition.
