= Alvar Johannes Alev =

Estonian cross-country skier (born 1993)

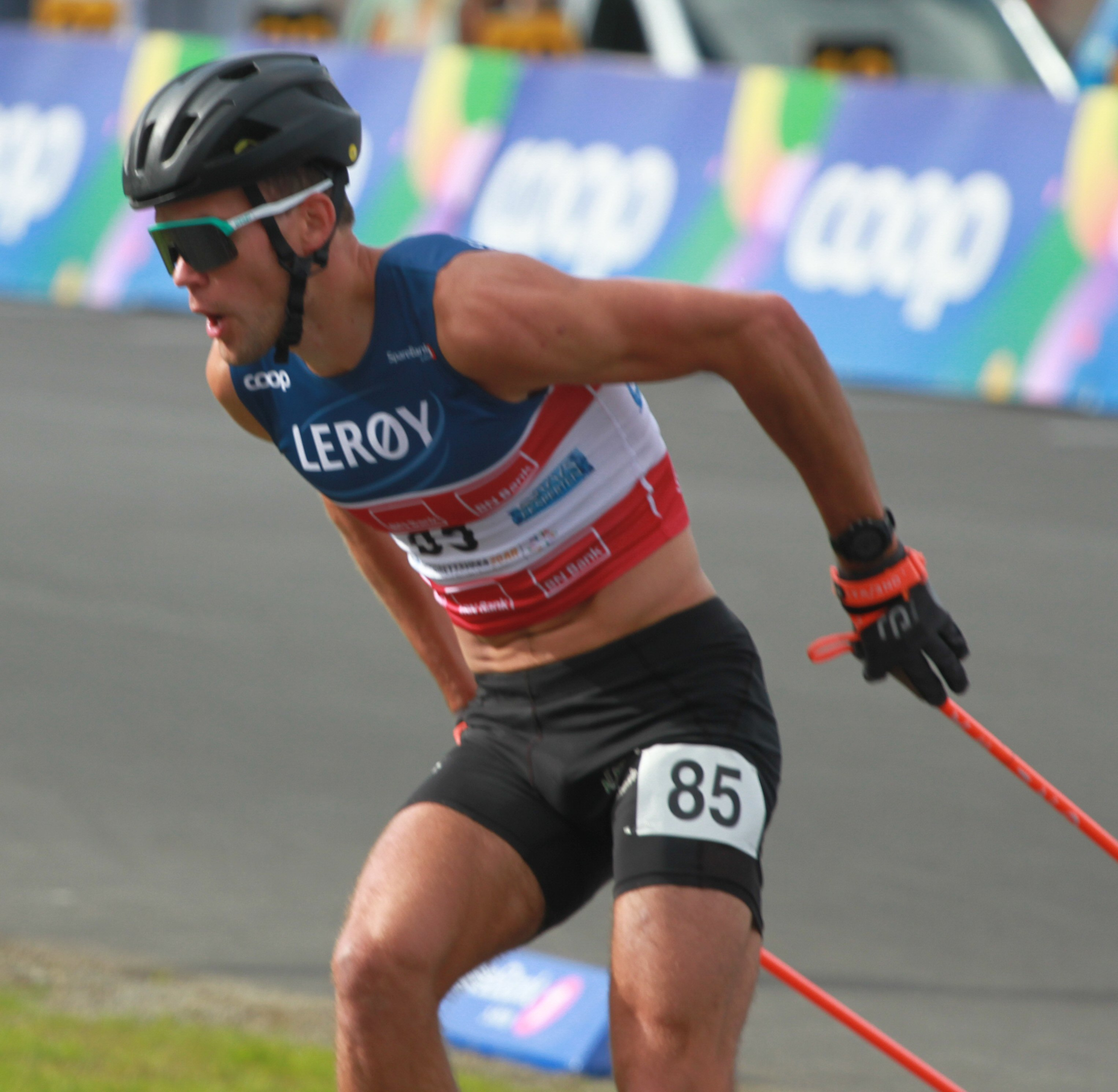
- Alev in 2024

Personal information
- Nationality: Estonia
- Born: 29 September 1993 (age 32) Jõesuu, Estonia

Sport
- Sport: Skiing
- Club: Suusaklubi Jõulu (Ski Club Jõulu)

World Cup career
- Seasons: 10 – (2012–2013, 2015–2017, 2019–present)
- Indiv. starts: 49
- Indiv. podiums: 0
- Team starts: 8
- Team podiums: 0
- Overall titles: 0 – (104th in 2023)
- Discipline titles: 0
- Updated on 29 March 2023

Alvar Johannes Alev (born 29 September 1993) is an Estonian cross-country skier who competes internationally.

He represented his country at the 2022 Winter Olympics.

== Cross-country skiing results ==
All results are sourced from the International Ski Federation (FIS).

=== Olympic Games ===
Year	Age	15 km individual	30 km skiathlon	50 km mass start	Sprint	4 × 10 km relay	Team sprint
2022	28	33	35	36^{[a]}	—	15	—

^{a} Distance reduced to 30 km due to weather conditions.

=== World Championships ===
Year	Age	15 km individual	30 km skiathlon	50 km mass start	Sprint	4 × 10 km relay	Team sprint
2017	23	—	52	—	—	—	—
2021	27	56	54	—	79	13	—
2023	29	51	35	35	—	12	—

=== World Cup ===
==== Season standings ====
Season	Age	Discipline standings				Ski Tour standings				
Season	Age	Overall	Distance	Sprint	U23	Nordic Opening	Tour de Ski	Ski Tour 2020	World Cup Final	Ski Tour Canada
2012	18	NC	NC	NC	—N/a	—	—	—N/a	—	—N/a
2013	19	NC	—	NC	—N/a	—	—	—N/a	—	—N/a
2015	21	NC	—	NC	NC	—	—	—N/a	—N/a	—N/a
2016	22	NC	NC	—	NC	—	—	—N/a	—N/a	—
2017	23	NC	NC	NC	—N/a	—	—	—N/a	—	—N/a
2019	25	NC	NC	NC	—N/a	—	—	—N/a	63	—N/a
2020	26	NC	NC	NC	—N/a	—	—	DNF	—N/a	—N/a
2021	27	NC	NC	NC	—N/a	—	—	—N/a	—N/a	—N/a
2022	28	NC	NC	NC	—N/a	—N/a	DNF	—N/a	—N/a	—N/a
2023	29	104	59	NC	—N/a	—N/a	—	—N/a	—N/a	—N/a
