= Cross-country skiing at the 2022 Winter Olympics – Men's 4 × 10 kilometre relay =

Men's 4 × 10 kilometre relay at the XXIV Olympic Winter Games
- Cross-country skiing
- Venue: Kuyangshu Nordic Center and Biathlon Center, Zhangjiakou
- Date: 13 February 2022
- Competitors: 60 from 15 nations
- Teams: 15
- Winning time: 1:54:50.7

Medalists
1st place, gold medalist(s)		Aleksey Chervotkin; Alexander Bolshunov; Denis Spitsov; Sergey Ustiugov	ROC
2nd place, silver medalist(s)		Emil Iversen; Pål Golberg; Hans Christer Holund; Johannes Høsflot Klæbo	Norway
3rd place, bronze medalist(s)		Richard Jouve; Hugo Lapalus; Clément Parisse; Maurice Manificat	France

The men's 4 × 10 kilometre relay competition in cross-country skiing at the 2022 Winter Olympics was held on 13 February, at the Kuyangshu Nordic Center and Biathlon Center in Zhangjiakou. Aleksey Chervotkin, Alexander Bolshunov, Denis Spitsov, and Sergey Ustiugov, representing the Russian Olympic Committee, won the event. It was the first gold for Russian athletes in the relay since 1980, when the Soviet Union won. Norway won the silver medal, and France bronze.

== Summary ==
Norway were the defending champion, and Russian Olympic Committee athletes and France were the 2018 silver and bronze medalists, respectively. The only relay in the 2021–22 FIS Cross-Country World Cup was won by Norway, with Russia second. Generally, the season was dominated by Norwegians and Russians, who together took 34 podium places in individual distance events out of 45. Norway were also the 2021 World Champion, with Russian Ski Federation second and France third. Only five nations - Finland, Italy, Norway, Russia, and Sweden - ever won the men's Olympic cross-country skiing relay.

During the whole competition, the Russian Olympic Committee team were in the lead, as Aleksey Chervotkin escaped from the rest of the competitors after 3 km. At the second interchange, Alexander Bolshunov had a minute lead over Norway and Sweden, and 1:10 over France, Germany, and Finland. These five teams skied the third leg together, though Finland soon started to drop behind. Eventually, Germany also dropped out of the pursuers group. At the third interchange, Denis Spitsov was 45 seconds ahead of Norway and Sweden and 50 seconds ahead of France, with other teams out of medal contention. The last leg featured Johannes Høsflot Klæbo for Norway, who previously became the individual sprint champion at these Olympics. After 2 km, Klæbo escaped from Maurice Manificat and Johan Häggström, but at 3 km he was still 40 seconds behind Sergey Ustiugov. At 5 km, Manificat escaped from Häggström and caught up with Klæbo, leaving Sweden without a medal. Ustyugov comfortably finished his leg with a minute of advantage, leaving him free to carry the ROC's Olympic flag across the finish line. Klæbo and Manificat skied together, several times trying to escape, until Klæbo managed to break away before entering the stadium, winning silver for Norway. France were third, as they were at the 2014 and 2018 Olympics.

Blowing fresh snow conditions made the ski tracks slow in Beijing, especially on the first two classic ski legs, contributing to a winning time more than 20 minutes slower than Norway's gold-medal time win at the 2018 Pyeongchang Olympics and nearly 30 minutes back of Sweden's at Sochi in 2014. Television coverage showed maintenance workers using leaf-blowers to clear loose fresh snow out of the ski tracks.

== Results ==
The race was started at 15:00.

Rank	Bib	Country	Time	Deficit
1st place, gold medalist(s)	2	ROC; Aleksey Chervotkin; Alexander Bolshunov; Denis Spitsov; Sergey Ustiugov	1:54:50.7; 30:14.7; 29:32.0; 27:22.6; 27:41.4	—
2nd place, silver medalist(s)	1	Norway; Emil Iversen; Pål Golberg; Hans Christer Holund; Johannes Høsflot Klæbo	1:55:57.9; 30:49.1; 29:57.1; 27:08.0; 28:03.7	+1:07.2
3rd place, bronze medalist(s)	3	France; Richard Jouve; Hugo Lapalus; Clément Parisse; Maurice Manificat	1:56:07.1; 31:04.9; 29:51.5; 27:02.1; 28:08.6	+1:16.4
4	4	Sweden; Oskar Svensson; William Poromaa; Jens Burman; Johan Häggström	1:57:00.4; 31:16.0; 29:30.4; 27:08.3; 29:05.7	+2:09.7
5	7	Germany; Janosch Brugger; Friedrich Moch; Florian Notz; Lucas Bögl	1:57:46.5; 30:38.2; 30:18.5; 28:08.1; 28:41.7	+2:55.8
6	6	Finland; Ristomatti Hakola; Iivo Niskanen; Perttu Hyvärinen; Joni Mäki	1:59:28.6; 32:02.2; 28:53.9; 29:08.8; 29:23.7	+4:37.9
7	5	Switzerland; Dario Cologna; Jonas Baumann; Candide Pralong; Roman Furger	2:00:13.3; 31:12.1; 30:51.9; 28:32.8; 29:36.5	+5:22.6
8	14	Italy; Federico Pellegrino; Francesco De Fabiani; Giandomenico Salvadori; Davide Graz	2:00:16.6; 30:38.8; 30:52.1; 29:05.8; 29:39.9	+5:25.9
9	8	United States; Luke Jager; Scott Patterson; Gus Schumacher; Kevin Bolger	2:02:56.3; 32:53.7; 31:16.2; 29:03.4; 29:43.0	+8:05.6
10	9	Japan; Ryo Hirose; Hiroyuki Miyazawa; Naoto Baba; Haruki Yamashita	2:03:01.5; 31:13.0; 32:49.4; 28:50.1; 30:09.0	+8:10.8
11	10	Canada; Graham Ritchie; Antoine Cyr; Olivier Léveillé; Rémi Drolet	2:04:01.1; 32:57.3; 31:51.6; 29:05.0; 30:07.2	+9:10.4
12	11	Czech Republic; Adam Fellner; Michal Novák; Petr Knop; Jan Pechoušek	2:04:57.8; 31:48.8; 31:58.1; 29:06.0; 32:04.9	+10:07.1
13	13	China; Shang Jincai; Liu Rongsheng; Wang Qiang; Chen Degen	LAP; 32:26.3; 32:24.9; 29:45.3; LAP	
14	15	Slovenia; Miha Šimenc; Miha Ličef; Vili Črv; Janez Lampič	LAP; 31:11.5; 33:19.2; 29:47.9; LAP	
15	12	Estonia; Marko Kilp; Alvar Johannes Alev; Martin Himma; Henri Roos	LAP; 34:09.6; 31:52.3; LAP	
