= FIS Nordic World Ski Championships 2023 – Men's 15 kilometre freestyle =

Men's 15 kilometre freestyle at the FIS Nordic World Ski Championships 2023
- Venue: Planica Nordic Centre
- Location: Planica, Slovenia
- Dates: 22 February (qualification); 1 March
- Competitors: 100 from 40 nations
- Winning time: 32:17.4

Medalists
gold medal	Simen Hegstad Krüger	Norway
silver medal	Harald Østberg Amundsen	Norway
bronze medal	Hans Christer Holund	Norway

The Men's 15 kilometre freestyle competition at the FIS Nordic World Ski Championships 2023 was held on 22 February and 1 March 2023.

== Results ==
=== Final ===
The race was started at 12:30.

Rank	Bib	Athlete	Country	Time	Deficit	Notes
1st place, gold medalist(s)	44	Simen Hegstad Krüger	Norway	32:17.4		
2nd place, silver medalist(s)	64	Harald Østberg Amundsen	Norway	32:22.7	+5.3	
3rd place, bronze medalist(s)	46	Hans Christer Holund	Norway	32:42.0	+24.6	
4	48	Johannes Høsflot Klæbo	Norway	32:42.9	+25.5	
5	42	William Poromaa	Sweden	33:06.3	+48.9	
6	50	Sjur Røthe	Norway	33:10.2	+52.8	
7	30	Irineu Esteve Altimiras	Andorra	33:24.2	+1:06.8	
8	52	Friedrich Moch	Germany	33:25.5	+1:08.1	
9	68	Andrew Musgrave	United Kingdom	33:34.4	+1:17.0	
10	60	Clément Parisse	France	33:38.6	+1:21.2	
11	56	Hugo Lapalus	France	33:39.5	+1:22.1	
12	62	Michal Novák	Czech Republic	33:47.7	+1:30.3	
13	54	Perttu Hyvärinen	Finland	33:49.3	+1:31.9	
14	40	Naoto Baba	Japan	33:49.7	+1:32.3	
15	70	Scott Patterson	United States	33:50.4	+1:33.0	
16	58	Jules Lapierre	France	33:52.4	+1:35.0	
17	35	Maurice Manificat	France	33:57.2	+1:39.8	
18	25	Jonas Dobler	Germany	33:58.3	+1:40.9	
19	33	Gus Schumacher	United States	34:00.3	+1:42.9	
20	22	Johan Häggström	Sweden	34:01.0	+1:43.6	
21	66	Jens Burman	Sweden	34:04.4	+1:47.0	
22	69	Snorri Einarsson	Iceland	34:09.8	+1:52.4	
23	18	Paolo Ventura	Italy	34:12.1	+1:54.7	
24	8	Niko Anttola	Finland	34:16.4	+1:59.0	
25	31	Lucas Bögl	Germany	34:19.0	+2:01.6	
26	21	Thomas Maloney Westgård	Ireland	34:24.1	+2:06.7	
27	36	Ben Ogden	United States	34:25.1	+2:07.7	
28	32	Olivier Léveillé	Canada	34:29.9	+2:12.5	
29	17	Andrew Young	United Kingdom	34:41.3	+2:23.9	
30	4	Joe Davies	United Kingdom	34:42.5	+2:25.1	
31	23	Janosch Brugger	Germany	34:46.0	+2:28.6	
32	39	Remi Lindholm	Finland	34:48.9	+2:31.5	
33	37	Hunter Wonders	United States	34:58.8	+2:41.4	
34	26	Simone Dapra	Italy	34:59.4	+2:42.0	
35	14	Davide Graz	Italy	35:03.5	+2:46.1	
36	13	Adam Fellner	Czech Republic	35:04.7	+2:47.3	
37	38	Beda Klee	Switzerland	35:07.1	+2:49.7	
38	53	Miha Šimenc	Slovenia	35:09.1	+2:51.7	
39	15	Paul Constantin Pepene	Romania	35:20.5	+3:03.1	
40	6	Imanol Rojo	Spain	35:22.5	+3:05.1	
41	20	Haruki Yamashita	Japan	35:23.8	+3:06.4	
42	27	Cyril Fähndrich	Switzerland	35:24.2	+3:06.8	
43	34	Markus Vuorela	Finland	35:25.9	+3:08.5	
44	24	Dominik Bury	Poland	35:32.1	+3:14.7	
45	9	Elia Barp	Italy	35:33.5	+3:16.1	
46	12	Graham Ritchie	Canada	35:33.7	+3:16.3	
47	16	Martin Himma	Estonia	35:37.8	+3:20.4	
48	28	Candide Pralong	Switzerland	35:40.3	+3:22.9	
49	63	Miha Ličef	Slovenia	35:41.0	+3:23.6	
50	19	Edvin Anger	Sweden	35:53.2	+3:35.8	
51	11	Alvar Johannes Alev	Estonia	35:53.6	+3:36.2	
52	5	Raul Mihai Popa	Romania	35:55.8	+3:38.4	
53	65	Kamil Bury	Poland	35:58.5	+3:41.1	
54	67	Olzhas Klimin	Kazakhstan	35:58.5	+3:41.1	
55	41	Kaarel Kasper Kõrge	Estonia	36:00.0	+3:42.6	
56	59	Mikayel Mikayelyan	Armenia	36:09.2	+3:51.8	
57	7	Nail Bashmakov	Kazakhstan	36:10.6	+3:53.2	
58	2	Philipp Leodolter	Austria	36:20.7	+4:03.3	
59	81	Lars Young Vik	Australia	36:24.4	+4:07.0	
60	61	Xavier McKeever	Canada	36:24.5	+4:07.1	
61	75	Maciej Staręga	Poland	36:26.9	+4:09.5	
62	79	Ruslan Denysenko	Ukraine	36:30.9	+4:13.5	
63	43	Seve De Campo	Australia	36:37.5	+4:20.1	
64	1	Raimo Vīgants	Latvia	36:50.5	+4:33.1	
65	49	Sebastian Bryja	Poland	36:53.1	+4:35.7	
66	87	Batmönkhiin Achbadrakh	Mongolia	36:55.8	+4:38.4	
67	80	Vili Črv	Slovenia	37:00.4	+4:43.0	
68	74	Dmytro Drahun	Ukraine	37:07.8	+4:50.4	
69	55	Daniel Peshkov	Bulgaria	37:24.2	+5:06.8	
70	45	Tomáš Lukeš	Czech Republic	37:24.3	+5:06.9	
71	47	Indulis Bikše	Latvia	37:25.0	+5:07.6	
72	82	Albert Jonsson	Iceland	37:36.5	+5:19.1	
73	85	Jošt Mulej	Slovenia	37:41.7	+5:24.3	
74	78	Oleksandr Lisohor	Ukraine	37:43.0	+5:25.6	
75	83	Dagur Benediktsson	Iceland	38:05.6	+5:48.2	
76	84	Andrej Renda	Slovakia	38:13.8	+5:56.4	
77	77	Lauris Kaparkalējs	Latvia	38:15.1	+5:57.7	
78	89	Ádám Kónya	Hungary	38:18.0	+6:00.6	
79	86	Robin Frommelt	Liechtenstein	38:22.4	+6:05.0	
80	73	Franco Dal Farra	Argentina	38:23.3	+6:05.9	
81	99	Apostolos Angelis	Greece	38:54.7	+6:37.3	
82	90	Kristóf Lágler	Hungary	39:13.5	+6:56.1	
83	71	Strahinja Erić	Bosnia and Herzegovina	39:15.5	+6:58.1	
84	93	Spartak Voskanyan	Armenia	39:16.0	+6:58.6	
85	98	Adam Buki	Hungary	39:49.7	+7:32.3	
86	3	Stavre Jada	North Macedonia	39:53.4	+7:36.0	
87	95	Manex Silva	Brazil	39:58.7	+7:41.3	
88	92	Nikolaos Tsourekas	Greece	40:14.6	+7:57.2	
89	76	Niks Saulītis	Lithuania	40:29.9	+8:12.5	
90	91	Miloš Stević	Bosnia and Herzegovina	40:39.1	+8:21.7	
91	100	Stevenson Savart	Haiti	41:29.6	+9:12.2	
92	96	Danyal Saveh Shemshaki	Iran	41:48.1	+9:30.7	
93	97	Yusuf Emre Fırat	Turkey	42:18.1	+10:00.7	
94	94	Yusuf Talay	Turkey	43:07.8	+10:50.4	
	10	Vitaliy Pukhkalo	Kazakhstan	Disqualified		
	72	Todor Malchov	Bulgaria	Did not start		
	51	Simeon Deyanov	Bulgaria	Did not start		
	29	Roman Furger	Switzerland	Did not start		
	88	Darko Damjanovski	North Macedonia	Did not finish		
	57	Fedor Karpov	Kazakhstan	Did not finish		

=== Qualification ===
The qualification was started on 22 February at 13:30.

Rank	Bib	Athlete	Country	Time	Deficit	Notes
1	71	Albert Jónsson	Iceland	26:47.1		Q
2	59	Manex Silva	Brazil	27:39.9	+52.8	Q
3	62	Spartak Voskanyan	Armenia	27:50.3	+1:03.2	Q
4	22	Stevenson Savart	Haiti	27:56.9	+1:09.8	Q
5	70	Dagur Benediktsson	Iceland	27:58.9	+1:11.8	Q
6	32	Ádám Büki	Hungary	28:03.4	+1:16.3	Q
7	66	Fredrik Fodstad	Colombia	28:07.2	+1:20.1	Q
8	46	Mark Chanloung	Thailand	28:25.6	+1:38.5	Q
9	58	Danial Saveh-Shemshaki	Iran	28:32.0	+1:44.9	Q
10	67	Ádám Kónya	Hungary	28:44.0	+1:56.9	Q
11	57	Gonzalo Ángel Gómez	Argentina	29:05.2	+2:18.1	
12	43	Samuel Maes	Belgium	29:27.6	+2:40.5	
13	53	Aleksandar Grbović	Montenegro	29:30.6	+2:43.5	
14	69	Rainers Paeglis	Latvia	29:31.9	+2:44.8	
15	54	Miloš Čolić	Bosnia and Herzegovina	29:35.5	+2:48.4	
16	65	Jēkabs Skolnieks	Latvia	29:49.6	+3:02.5	
17	63	Tadevos Poghosyan	Armenia	29:50.0	+3:02.9	
18	28	Mathis Poutot	Belgium	29:51.8	+3:04.7	
19	55	Timo Juhani Grönlund	Bolivia	30:00.5	+3:13.4	
20	60	Bruno Krampe	Latvia	30:01.9	+3:14.8	
21	34	Milos Milosavljević	Serbia	30:08.2	+3:21.1	
22	45	José Cabeça	Portugal	30:21.5	+3:34.4	
23	56	Dimitris Velivassis	Greece	30:46.4	+3:59.3	
24	51	Hamit Tarık Aydın	Turkey	30:53.1	+4:06.0	
25	48	Sebastian Endrestad	Chile	31:00.2	+4:13.1	
26	52	Nahuel Torres	Argentina	31:04.7	+4:17.6	
27	44	Mateo Lorenzo Sauma	Argentina	31:12.3	+4:25.2	
28	38	Samuel Ikpefan	Nigeria	31:12.8	+4:25.2	
29	27	Theo Mallet	Haiti	31:17.4	+4:30.3	
30	68	Victor Santos	Brazil	31:56.5	+5:09.4	
31	61	Amed Oglago	Turkey	31:57.0	+5:09.9	
32	49	David Torevski	North Macedonia	32:07.8	+5:20.7	
33	13	Rodrigo Ideus	Colombia	32:14.9	+5:27.8	
34	41	Blagoja Najdenoski	North Macedonia	32:16.0	+5:28.9	
35	39	Matas Grazys	Lithuania	32:24.9	+5:37.8	
36	36	Ioannis Karamichos	Greece	32:31.0	+5:43.9	
37	64	Yonathan Jesús Fernández	Chile	32:33.3	+5:46.2	
38	37	Iulian Luchin	Moldova	32:45.4	+5:58.3	
39	50	Victor Sendrea	Moldova	32:56.1	+6:09.0	
40	31	Elie Tawk	Lebanon	33:09.6	+6:22.5	
41	19	Jaime Luis Huerta	Peru	33:38.7	+6:51.6	
42	40	Paul Keyrouz	Lebanon	33:41.4	+6:54.3	
43	47	Georgios Anastasiadis	Greece	33:44.5	+6:57.4	
44	42	Ernest Tretjakov	Lithuania	33:45.2	+6:58.1	
45	3	Artur Saparbekov	Kyrgyzstan	33:47.6	+7:00.5	
46	33	Mehdi Tir	Iran	34:02.4	+7:15.3	
47	11	Carlos Andrés Quintana	Colombia	34:03.9	+7:16.8	
48	14	Pedro Montes De Oca	Mexico	34:18.3	+7:31.2	
49	29	Ahmad Reza Seid	Iran	34:20.8	+7:33.7	
50	24	Guillermo Racero	Venezuela	36:12.3	+9:25.2	
51	18	Salim Lozom	Lebanon	36:25.1	+9:38.0	
52	9	Allan Corona	Mexico	36:26.6	+9:39.5	
53	17	Juan Luis Uberuaga	Chile	36:32.5	+9:45.4	
54	30	Musa Rakhmanberdi Uulu	Kyrgyzstan	36:34.8	+9:47.7	
55	20	Eldar Kadyrov	Kyrgyzstan	36:53.8	+10:06.7	
56	21	Djordje Paunović	Serbia	37:24.3	+10:37.2	
57	7	Filipe Cabrita	Portugal	37:26.2	+10:39.1	
58	23	Joe Tawk	Lebanon	37:46.0	+10:58.9	
59	2	Rakan Alireza	Saudi Arabia	38:17.3	+11:30.2	
60	26	Antonio Pineyro	Mexico	38:38.8	+11:51.7	
61	10	Tristan Monchablon	Dominica	39:15.7	+12:28.6	
62	12	Islam Turganbaev	Kyrgyzstan	39:29.6	+12:42.5	
63	35	Klaus Jungbluth	Ecuador	40:02.5	+13:15.4	
64	16	Juan Carlos Ayala	Mexico	40:59.3	+14:12.2	
65	15	Jawad Aidaoui	Morocco	41:10.7	+14:23.6	
66	1	Nicholas Lau	Trinidad and Tobago	41:12.3	+14:25.2	
67	6	Warren Aubrey Samberg	Israel	41:40.7	+14:53.6	
68	8	Ricardo Jay Lung	Panama	42:17.6	+15:30.5	
69	5	Tarik Aslani	Serbia	45:06.0	+18:18.9	
	25	Dani Cholakov	Bulgaria	Did not start		
