= Thibaut De Marre =

Belgian cross-country skier (born 1998)

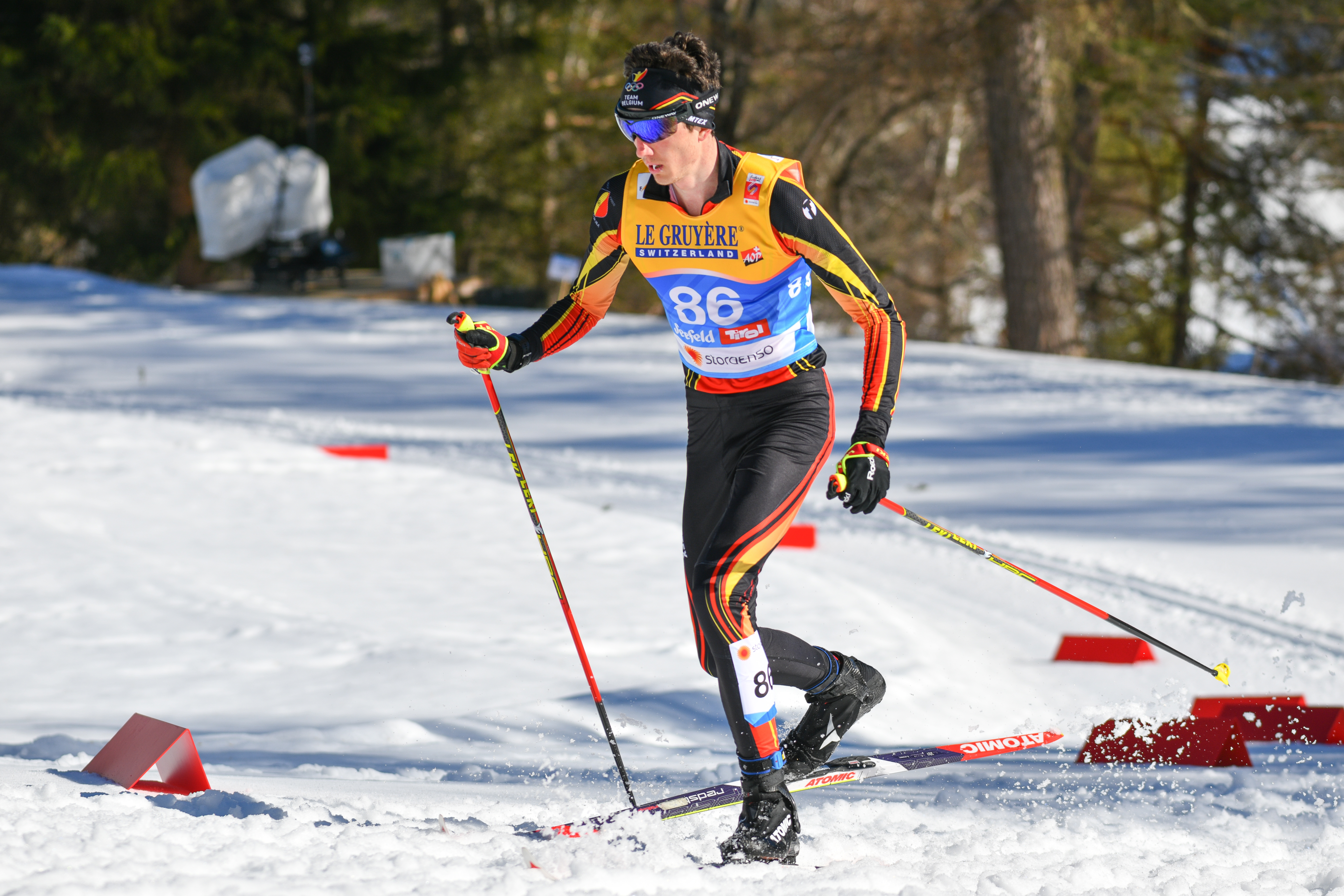
- De Marre in 2019

Personal information
- Nationality: Belgium
- Born: 23 February 1998 (age 28) Grenoble, France
- Height: 1.91 m (6 ft 3 in)

Sport
- Sport: Skiing
- Club: SRHF

World Cup career
- Indiv. podiums: 0
- Overall titles: 0
- Discipline titles: 0

Thibaut De Marre (born 23 February 1998) is a Belgian cross-country skier. He competed in the 15 kilometre classical, the 30 kilometre skiathlon and the sprint at the 2022 Winter Olympics.
