= Kong Fanying =

Chinese alpine skier (born 1996)

Personal information
- Born: 27 April 1996 (age 28); Harbin, Heilongjiang, China

Sport
- Country: China
- Sport: Alpine skiing

Kong Fanying (Chinese: 孔凡影; pinyin: Kǒng Fányǐng; Mandarin pronunciation: [kʰʊ̀ŋ fǎn ìŋ]; born 27 April 1996) is a Chinese alpine skier. She competed in slalom and giant slalom at the 2018 Winter Olympics. She also competed at the 2022 Winter Olympics.
