= Cross-country skiing at the 2022 Winter Olympics – Men's 15 kilometre classical =

Men's 15 kilometre classical at the XXIV Olympic Winter Games
- Cross-country skiing
- Venue: Kuyangshu Nordic Center and Biathlon Center, Zhangjiakou
- Date: 11 February 2022
- Competitors: 99 from 50 nations
- Winning time: 37:54.8

Medalists
1st place, gold medalist(s)		Iivo Niskanen	Finland
2nd place, silver medalist(s)		Alexander Bolshunov	ROC
3rd place, bronze medalist(s)		Johannes Høsflot Klæbo	Norway

The men's 15 kilometre classical competition in cross-country skiing at the 2022 Winter Olympics was held on 11 February, at the Kuyangshu Nordic Center and Biathlon Center in Zhangjiakou. The event was won by Iivo Niskanen of Finland. Alexander Bolshunov, representing the Russian Olympic Committee, won silver, and Johannes Høsflot Klæbo of Norway became the bronze medalist.

== Summary ==
The 15 km distance event alternates between the Olympics, and in 2018 it was the freestyle event. The defending champion was Dario Cologna, who won this distance three times in a row (in 2010, 2014, and 2018), as well as 30k skiathlon in 2014. He finished in the 44th position. The silver medalist Simen Hegstad Krüger qualified for the Olympics but tested positive for COVID just before the games and was not able to start. The bronze medalist Denis Spitsov qualified as well, but did not start either. The overall leader of the 2021–22 FIS Cross-Country World Cup before the Olympics was Klæbo, and the distance leader was Bolshunov. The season was dominated by the Norwegians and Russians, who together took 20 podium places in distance events out of 24, and three more podium places were taken by Niskanen. Hans Christer Holund was the 2021 World Champion in 15 km freestyle.

Niskanen was consistently leading for the whole distance. Klæbo started the first of the three eventual medalists, but Niskanen was 37.5 seconds faster. Bolshunov, who started after Niskanen, was consistently second.

== Results ==
Rank	Bib	Name	Country	Time	Deficit
1st place, gold medalist(s)	64	Iivo Niskanen	Finland	37:54.8	
2nd place, silver medalist(s)	70	Alexander Bolshunov	ROC	38:18.0	+23.2
3rd place, bronze medalist(s)	42	Johannes Høsflot Klæbo	Norway	38:32.3	+37.5
4	46	Hans Christer Holund	Norway	38:44.6	+49.8
5	68	Aleksey Chervotkin	ROC	38:51.7	+56.9
6	36	Perttu Hyvärinen	Finland	39:00.2	+1:05.4
7	62	Hugo Lapalus	France	39:09.6	+1:14.8
8	39	Jens Burman	Sweden	39:26.8	+1:32.0
9	60	Ilia Semikov	ROC	39:34.7	+1:39.9
10	33	William Poromaa	Sweden	39:42.5	+1:47.7
11	44	Pål Golberg	Norway	39:47.4	+1:52.6
12	38	Maurice Manificat	France	39:49.7	+1:54.9
13	66	Ivan Yakimushkin	ROC	39:52.6	+1:57.8
14	24	Thomas Maloney Westgård	Ireland	40:01.5	+2:06.7
15	58	Erik Valnes	Norway	40:06.8	+2:12.0
16	50	Jonas Baumann	Switzerland	40:09.7	+2:14.9
17	48	Lucas Bögl	Germany	40:13.9	+2:19.1
18	56	Francesco De Fabiani	Italy	40:16.4	+2:21.6
19	37	Jonas Dobler	Germany	40:21.0	+2:26.2
20	26	Janosch Brugger	Germany	40:24.5	+2:29.7
21	29	Johan Häggström	Sweden	40:30.9	+2:36.1
22	25	Giandomenico Salvadori	Italy	40:33.2	+2:38.4
23	15	Mika Vermeulen	Austria	40:37.8	+2:43.0
24	31	Irineu Esteve Altimiras	Andorra	40:39.4	+2:44.6
25	23	Vitaliy Pukhkalo	Kazakhstan	40:39.6	+2:44.8
26	35	Calle Halfvarsson	Sweden	40:46.8	+2:52.0
27	16	Dominik Bury	Poland	40:48.4	+2:53.6
28	32	Ristomatti Hakola	Finland	40:49.6	+2:54.8
29	5	Olivier Léveillé	Canada	40:52.0	+2:57.2
30	20	Paul Pepene	Romania	40:52.7	+2:57.9
31	10	Adam Fellner	Czech Republic	41:01.0	+3:06.2
32	14	Albert Kuchler	Germany	41:07.1	+3:12.3
33	7	Rémi Drolet	Canada	41:07.7	+3:12.9
34	22	Paolo Ventura	Italy	41:12.2	+3:17.4
35	63	Alvar Johannes Alev	Estonia	41:12.5	+3:17.7
36	11	Snorri Einarsson	Iceland	41:17.6	+3:22.8
37	19	Antoine Cyr	Canada	41:17.7	+3:22.9
38	27	Scott Patterson	United States	41:23.1	+3:28.3
39	21	Imanol Rojo	Spain	41:24.2	+3:29.4
40	6	Yevgeniy Velichko	Kazakhstan	41:27.3	+3:32.5
41	4	Shang Jincai	China	41:29.6	+3:34.8
42	1	Ben Ogden	United States	41:29.8	+3:35.0
43	9	Ryo Hirose	Japan	41:30.5	+3:35.7
44	40	Dario Cologna	Switzerland	41:39.9	+3:45.1
45	12	Remi Lindholm	Finland	41:40.0	+3:45.2
46	52	Andrew Musgrave	Great Britain	41:44.7	+3:49.9
47	49	Liu Rongsheng	China	41:51.7	+3:56.9
48	34	Gus Schumacher	United States	41:53.4	+3:58.6
49	17	Richard Jouve	France	41:56.6	+4:01.8
50	54	Michal Novák	Czech Republic	42:06.6	+4:11.8
51	30	Andrew Young	Great Britain	42:24.0	+4:29.2
52	61	Maicol Rastelli	Italy	42:25.4	+4:30.6
53	28	Jason Rüesch	Switzerland	42:29.8	+4:35.0
54	13	Petr Knop	Czech Republic	42:34.4	+4:39.6
55	2	Miha Ličef	Slovenia	42:43.4	+4:48.6
56	65	Martin Himma	Estonia	42:44.4	+4:49.6
57	43	Hadesi Badelihan	China	42:48.1	+4:53.3
58	72	Peter Mlynár	Slovakia	42:49.9	+4:55.1
59	79	Thibaut de Marre	Belgium	42:56.7	+5:01.9
60	55	Mateusz Haratyk	Poland	43:00.3	+5:05.5
61	59	Mikayel Mikayelyan	Armenia	43:09.1	+5:14.3
62	8	Raimo Vīgants	Latvia	43:10.9	+5:16.1
63	73	Ciren Zhandui	China	43:22.2	+5:27.4
64	67	Raul Popa	Romania	43:25.3	+5:30.5
65	90	Batmönkhiin Achbadrakh	Mongolia	43:29.9	+5:35.1
66	69	JC Schoonmaker	United States	43:31.6	+5:36.8
67	18	Hiroyuki Miyazawa	Japan	43:47.5	+5:52.7
68	87	Yahor Shpuntau	Belarus	44:05.2	+6:10.4
69	76	Vili Črv	Slovenia	44:12.9	+6:18.1
70	77	Henri Roos	Estonia	44:17.8	+6:23.0
71	74	Miha Šimenc	Slovenia	44:20.8	+6:26.0
72	81	Seve de Campo	Australia	44:21.2	+6:26.4
73	86	Mark Chanloung	Thailand	44:27.0	+6:32.2
74	75	Roberts Slotiņš	Latvia	44:44.8	+6:50.0
75	78	Phillip Bellingham	Australia	44:46.8	+6:52.0
76	89	Lars Young Vik	Australia	44:50.6	+6:55.8
77	71	Oleksiy Krasovsky	Ukraine	44:59.8	+7:05.0
78	47	Ruslan Perekhoda	Ukraine	45:05.6	+7:10.8
79	45	Kim Min-woo	South Korea	45:21.6	+7:26.8
80	80	Ádám Kónya	Hungary	45:48.9	+7:54.1
81	92	Hugo Hinckfuss	Australia	46:05.9	+8:11.1
82	41	Jeong Jong-won	South Korea	46:34.6	+8:39.8
83	82	Tautvydas Strolia	Lithuania	46:53.1	+8:58.3
84	96	Danial Saveh Shemshaki	Iran	47:26.0	+9:31.2
85	85	Marko Skender	Croatia	48:30.8	+10:36.0
86	84	Franco Dal Farra	Argentina	48:35.5	+10:40.7
87	53	Strahinja Erić	Bosnia and Herzegovina	48:38.3	+10:43.5
88	98	José Cabeça	Portugal	49:12.0	+11:17.2
89	94	Timo Juhani Grönlund	Bolivia	49:27.0	+11:32.2
90	83	Manex Silva	Brazil	50:35.1	+12:40.3
91	88	Yonathan Jesús Fernández	Chile	50:36.6	+12:41.8
92	91	Elie Tawk	Lebanon	51:46.5	+13:51.7
93	93	Aleksandar Grbović	Montenegro	52:44.9	+14:50.1
94	99	Jonathan Soto	Mexico	53:30.0	+15:35.2
95	97	Carlos Quintana	Colombia	55:41.9	+17:47.1
	51	Yusuf Emre Fırat	Turkey	Did not finish	
	95	Samuel Ikpefan	Nigeria	Did not finish	
	3	Jan Pechoušek	Czech Republic	Did not start	
	57	Aliaksandr Voranau	Belarus	Did not start	
