= Zhang Yangming =

Chinese alpine skier (born 1994)

Personal information
- Native name: 张洋铭
- Nationality: Chinese
- Born: 31 August 1994 (age 30); Tonghua, Jilin, China
- Home town: Jilin
- Years active: 2011–present
- Height: 5 ft 8 in (173 cm)

Sport
- Sport: Alpine skiing

Zhang Yangming (born 31 August 1994) is a Chinese alpine skier. He competed in the 2018 and 2022 Winter Olympics.

== Career ==
=== 2018 PyeongChang Winter Olympics ===
2018 Olympics results
discipline	event	date	place	time	behind	notes
Alpine Skiing	Men's giant slalom	18 February 2018	69th	2:48.68	+30.64	top China finisher

=== 2019 ===
In March 2019, Zhang fractured his tibia and fibula and had three steel nails inserted into his ankle after an accident while training in Austria.

=== 2022 Beijing Winter Olympics ===
Zhang competed in all five men's individual alpine skiing events.

2022 Olympics results
discipline	event	date	place	time	behind	notes
Alpine Skiing	Men's combined	10 February 2022	16th	2:49.72	+18.29	top China finisher
Alpine Skiing	Men's downhill	7 February 2022	did not finish	–	–	
Alpine Skiing	Men's giant slalom	13 February 2022	36th	2:35.17	+25.82	second China finisher
Alpine Skiing	Men's slalom	16 February 2022	did not finish	–	–	
Alpine Skiing	Men's super-G	8 February 2022	33rd	1:29.39	+9.45	top China finisher
