= Fan Duoyao =

Chinese luger

Personal information
- Born: 25 April 1997 (age 28) Hulunbuir, China

Sport
- Country: China
- Sport: Luge

Fan Duoyao (Chinese: 范铎耀; pinyin: Fàn Duóyào; born 25 April 1997) is a Chinese luger who competes internationally.

He represented his country at the 2022 Winter Olympics.
