= Chen Degen =

Chinese cross-country skier (born 2001)

Personal information
- Born: 24 May 2001 (age 23); Yunnan, China

Sport
- Country: China
- Sport: Cross-country skiing

Chen Degen (Chinese: 陈 德根, born 24 May 2001) is a Chinese cross-country skier who competes internationally.

He represented his country at the 2022 Winter Olympics.
