= Liu Rongsheng =

Chinese cross-country skier

Personal information
- Born: 26 September 2001 (age 23); Yunnan, China

Sport
- Country: China
- Sport: Cross-country skiing

Liu Rongsheng (Chinese: 刘荣胜; pinyin: Liú Róngshèng) is a Chinese cross-country skier who competes internationally.

He represented his country at the 2022 Winter Olympics.

At the 2024 National Winter Games, he won a silver medal in men's double pursuit.
