= FIS Freestyle Ski and Snowboarding World Championships 2021 – Men's dual moguls =

Men's dual moguls at the FIS Freestyle Ski and Snowboarding World Championships 2021
- Venue: Shymbulak
- Location: Almaty, Kazakhstan
- Date: 9 March
- Competitors: 44 from 15 nations

Medalists
| gold medal | Mikaël Kingsbury | Canada |
| silver medal | Matt Graham | Australia |
| bronze medal | Ikuma Horishima | Japan |

The men's dual moguls competition at the FIS Freestyle Ski and Snowboarding World Championships 2021 was held on 9 March 2021.

== Results ==
=== Finals ===
Semifinals
6 | (Canada) Mikaël Kingsbury | 83.84
4 | (Japan) Ikuma Horishima | DNF
11 | (Canada) Brenden Kelly | 81.42
1 | (Australia) Matt Graham | 83.49

Finals
6 | (Canada) Mikaël Kingsbury | 80.51
1 | (Australia) Matt Graham | 67.57
Third place
4 | (Japan) Ikuma Horishima | 80.31
11 | (Canada) Brenden Kelly | DNF

=== Top half ===
==== Section 1 ====
Round of 64
31 | (France) Martin Suire | DNS
39 | (United Kingdom) Max Willis
42 | (Kazakhstan) Anton Bondarev | 77.03
23 | (United Kingdom) William Feneley | 79.03
36 | (Finland) Akseli Ahvenainen | 75.90
29 | (Russia) Artem Shuldyakov | 79.56

Round of 32
6 | (Canada) Mikaël Kingsbury | 86.22
39 | (United Kingdom) Max Willis | 74.55
27 | (Australia) James Matheson | 61.51
33 | (Finland) Jussi Penttala | 79.02
13 | (France) Sacha Theocharis | 74.66
23 | (United Kingdom) William Feneley | DNF
29 | (Russia) Artem Shuldyakov | 14.91
12 | (Kazakhstan) Dmitriy Reikherd | 84.53

Round of 16
6 | (Canada) Mikaël Kingsbury | 85.66
33 | (Finland) Jussi Penttala | 62.72
13 | (France) Sacha Theocharis | DNF
12 | (Kazakhstan) Dmitriy Reikherd | 78.16

Quarterfinals
6 | (Canada) Mikaël Kingsbury | 87.74
12 | (Kazakhstan) Dmitriy Reikherd | 82.19

==== Section 2 ====
Round of 64
22 | (Canada) Kerrian Chunlaud | 81.92
40 | (Italy) Massimo Bellucci | 54.09
47 | (Mexico) Andrés Valencia | 23.15
43 | (Russia) Mikhail Aleynikov | 80.54
30 | (United States) Alex Lewis | 76.38
17 | (Australia) Cooper Woods-Topalovic | DNF
15 | (Japan) Kosuke Sugimoto | 77.31
32 | (Japan) Takashi Koyama | 48.85

Round of 32
3 | (Sweden) Ludvig Fjällström | 80.40
22 | (Canada) Kerrian Chunlaud | 81.40
43 | (Russia) Mikhail Aleynikov | 75.31
9 | (United States) Nick Page | 81.02
25 | (Canada) Laurent Dumais | 80.29
30 | (United States) Alex Lewis | DNF
15 | (Japan) Kosuke Sugimoto | DNF
4 | (Japan) Ikuma Horishima | 84.12

Round of 16
22 | (Canada) Kerrian Chunlaud | 83.02
9 | (United States) Nick Page | 78.78
25 | (Canada) Laurent Dumais | 77.92
4 | (Japan) Ikuma Horishima | 83.82

Quarterfinals
22 | (Canada) Kerrian Chunlaud | 78.02
4 | (Japan) Ikuma Horishima | 87.31

=== Bottom half ===
==== Section 3 ====
Round of 64
44 | (Ukraine) Artur Yeremenko | DNF
11 | (Canada) Brenden Kelly | 78.62
38 | (Japan) Goshin Fujiki | 78.47
26 | (Sweden) Felix Elofsson | 29.13
10 | (United States) Dylan Walczyk | 80.02
46 | (United Kingdom) Mateo Jeannesson | 79.61

Round of 32
2 | (France) Benjamin Cavet | 56.00
11 | (Canada) Brenden Kelly | 82.77
21 | (Canada) Gabriel Dufresne | 76.99
8 | (United States) Bradley Wilson | 80.23
37 | (United Kingdom) Thomas Gerken Schofield | 77.52
38 | (Japan) Goshin Fujiki | 73.59
10 | (United States) Dylan Walczyk | 79.47
18 | (Kazakhstan) Pavel Kolmakov | 81.01

Round of 16
11 | (Canada) Brenden Kelly | 82.29
8 | (United States) Bradley Wilson | 78.92
37 | (United Kingdom) Thomas Gerken Schofield | 79.04
18 | (Kazakhstan) Pavel Kolmakov | DNF

Quarterfinals
11 | (Canada) Brenden Kelly | 80.32
37 | (United Kingdom) Thomas Gerken Schofield | 79.69

==== Section 4 ====
Round of 64
34 | (France) Jules Escobar | 73.99
14 | (Sweden) Oskar Elofsson | 79.56
41 | (Kazakhstan) Sergey Romanov | 43.56
20 | (Finland) Jussi Penttala | 82.11
19 | (Finland) Jimi Salonen | 68.25
45 | (South Korea) Jung Dae-yoon | DNF

Round of 32
35 | (Russia) Nikita Novitckii | 9.57
14 | (Sweden) Oskar Elofsson | 79.35
20 | (Finland) Jussi Penttala | DNF
5 | (Australia) Brodie Summers | 62.69
7 | (Switzerland) Marco Tadé | 75.53
28 | (Sweden) Albin Holmgren | 81.98
19 | (Finland) Jimi Salonen | 73.41
1 | (Australia) Matt Graham | 84.98

Round of 16
14 | (Sweden) Oskar Elofsson | 78.87
5 | (Australia) Brodie Summers | 75.94
28 | (Sweden) Albin Holmgren | DNF
1 | (Australia) Matt Graham | 77.72

Quarterfinals
14 | (Sweden) Oskar Elofsson | 61.13
1 | (Australia) Matt Graham | 78.48
