= FIS Freestyle Ski and Snowboarding World Championships 2017 – Men's dual moguls =

The men's dual moguls competition of the FIS Freestyle Ski and Snowboarding World Championships 2017 was held at Sierra Nevada, Spain on March 9 (qualifying and finals). 51 athletes from 18 countries competed.

== Qualification ==
The following are the results of the qualification.

=== Top half ===
Round of 64
35	Olli Penttala (FIN)	21
31	Kim Ji-hyon (KOR)	14
19	Ikuma Horishima (JPN)	33
39	Dmitriy Barmashov (KAZ)	2
44	Sergiy Chmel (UKR)	2
22	Walter Wallberg (SWE)	33

Round of 32
1	Mikaël Kingsbury (CAN)
35	Olli Penttala (FIN)	DNF
19	Ikuma Horishima (JPN)
22	Walter Wallberg (SWE)	DNF

Round of 16
1	Mikaël Kingsbury (CAN)	14
19	Ikuma Horishima (JPN)	21

Round of 64
46	Evgeniy Gedrovich (RUS)
33	Pavel Kolmakov (KAZ)	DNF
30	Egor Anufriev (RUS)	30
50	Daniel Honzig (CZE)	5

Round of 32
12	Jimi Salonen (FIN)	17
46	Evgeniy Gedrovich (RUS)	18
30	Egor Anufriev (RUS)	19
8	Brodie Summers (AUS)	16

Round of 16
46	Evgeniy Gedrovich (RUS)	DNF
30	Egor Anufriev (RUS)

Round of 64
34	Julius Garbe (GER)	10
21	Laurent Dumais (CAN)	25
18	Sho Endo (JPN)
51	Loke Nilsson (SWE)	DNF

Round of 32
4	Philippe Marquis (CAN)
21	Laurent Dumais (CAN)	DNF
18	Sho Endo (JPN)	13
11	Sacha Theocharis (FRA)	22

Round of 16
4	Philippe Marquis (CAN)	14
11	Sacha Theocharis (FRA)	21

Round of 64
41	Martin Romero (ESP)	DNF
24	Tevje Lie Andersen (NOR)
26	Nobuyuki Nishi (JPN)
52	Oleh Masyra (UKR)	DNS

Round of 32
16	Thomas Rowley (USA)	20
24	Tevje Lie Andersen (NOR)	15
26	Nobuyuki Nishi (JPN)	8
3	Matt Graham (AUS)	27

Round of 16
16	Thomas Rowley (USA)	20
3	Matt Graham (AUS)	15

=== Bottom half ===
Round of 64
45	Oskar Elofsson (SWE)	4
23	Jussi Penttala (FIN)	31
29	Jules Escobar (FRA)	27
40	Mingwei Dong (CHN)	8
38	Chen Kang (CHN)	DNF
13	Choi Jae-woo (KOR)

Round of 32
5	Dmitriy Reiherd (KAZ)
23	Jussi Penttala (FIN)	DNF
29	Jules Escobar (FRA)	14
13	Choi Jae-woo (KOR)	21

Round of 16
5	Dmitriy Reiherd (KAZ)	24
13	Choi Jae-woo (KOR)	11

Round of 64
49	Yang Zhao (CHN)
17	Daichi Hara (JPN)	DNS
20	Dylan Walczyk (USA)	21
47	Jannick Fjeldsoe (DEN)	14

Round of 32
15	Anthony Benna (FRA)	29
17	Yang Zhao (CHN)	6
20	Dylan Walczyk (USA)	15
7	Bradley Wilson (USA)	20

Round of 16
15	Anthony Benna (FRA)	15
7	Bradley Wilson (USA)	20

Round of 64
48	Suning Ning (CHN)	10
32	James Matheson (AUS)	25
27	Vinjar Slatten (NOR)	DNF
37	Andrey Makhnev (RUS)

Round of 32
6	Troy Murphy (USA)	30
32	James Matheson (AUS)	5
37	Andrey Makhnev (RUS)	19
9	Marc-Antoine Gagnon (CAN)	16

Round of 16
6	Troy Murphy (USA)	15
37	Andrey Makhnev (RUS)	20

Round of 64
14	Marco Tadé (SUI)	35
43	Oleg Tsinn (KAZ)	0
36	Topi Kanninen (FIN)	9
25	Seo Myung-joon (KOR)	26
28	Rohan Chapman-Davies (AUS)	DNS
42	Albin Holmgren (SWE)

Round of 32
14	Marco Tadé (SUI)	20
25	Seo Myung-joon (KOR)	15
42	Albin Holmgren (SWE)	12
2	Benjamin Cavet (FRA)	23

Round of 16
14	Marco Tadé (SUI)	19
2	Benjamin Cavet (FRA)	16

== Final ==
The following are the results of the finals.

Round of 16
1	Mikaël Kingsbury (CAN)	14
19	Ikuma Horishima (JPN)	21
46	Evgeniy Gedrovich (RUS)	0
30	Egor Anufriev (RUS)	35
4	Philippe Marquis (CAN)	14
11	Sacha Theocharis (FRA)	21
16	Thomas Rowley (USA)	20
3	Matt Graham (AUS)	15
5	Dmitriy Reiherd (KAZ)	24
13	Choi Jae-woo (KOR)	11
15	Anthony Benna (FRA)	15
7	Bradley Wilson (USA)	20
6	Troy Murphy (USA)	15
37	Andrey Makhnev (RUS)	20
14	Marco Tadé (SUI)	19
2	Benjamin Cavet (FRA)	16

Quarterfinals
19	Ikuma Horishima (JPN)	27
30	Egor Anufriev (RUS)	8
11	Sacha Theocharis (FRA)	26
16	Thomas Rowley (USA)	9
5	Dmitriy Reiherd (KAZ)	15
7	Bradley Wilson (USA)	20
37	Andrey Makhnev (RUS)	13
14	Marco Tadé (SUI)	22

Semifinals
19	Ikuma Horishima (JPN)	21
11	Sacha Theocharis (FRA)	14
7	Bradley Wilson (USA)	26
14	Marco Tadé (SUI)	9

Finals
19	Ikuma Horishima (JPN)	20 (gold)
7	Bradley Wilson (USA)	15 (silver)
Third place
11	Sacha Theocharis (FRA)	9
14	Marco Tadé (SUI)	26 (bronze)
