= FIS Freestyle Ski and Snowboarding World Championships 2017 – Men's moguls =

The men's moguls competition of the FIS Freestyle Ski and Snowboarding World Championships 2017 was held at Sierra Nevada, Spain, on March 8 (qualifying and finals). 51 athletes from 18 countries competed.

== Qualification ==
The following are the results of the qualification.

| Rank | Bib | Name | Country | Q1 | Q2 | Notes |
|---|---|---|---|---|---|---|
| 1 | 19 | Ikuma Horishima | Japan | 91.08 | | Q |
| 2 | 1 | Mikaël Kingsbury | Canada | 87.38 | | Q |
| 3 | 3 | Matt Graham | Australia | 81.56 | | Q |
| 4 | 16 | Thomas Rowley | United States | 81.36 | | Q |
| 5 | 5 | Dmitriy Reiherd | Kazakhstan | 80.09 | | Q |
| 6 | 14 | Marco Tadé | Switzerland | 79.46 | | Q |
| 7 | 7 | Bradley Wilson | United States | 79.38 | | Q |
| 8 | 8 | Brodie Summers | Australia | 79.29 | | Q |
| 9 | 27 | Vinjar Slatten | Norway | 79.28 | | Q |
| 10 | 2 | Benjamin Cavet | France | 75.75 | 81.37 | Q |
| 11 | 12 | Jimi Salonen | Finland | 78.59 | 81.25 | Q |
| 12 | 24 | Tevje Lie Andersen | Norway | 77.40 | 80.23 | Q |
| 13 | 9 | Marc-Antoine Gagnon | Canada | 78.13 | 80.00 | Q |
| 14 | 11 | Sacha Theocharis | France | 78.26 | 79.58 | Q |
| 15 | 4 | Philippe Marquis | Canada | 77.33 | 79.31 | Q |
| 16 | 23 | Jussi Penttala | Finland | 78.72 | 78.77 | Q |
| 17 | 28 | Rohan Chapman-Davies | Australia | 74.84 | 78.31 | Q |
| 18 | 15 | Anthony Benna | France | 78.01 | DNF | Q |
| 19 | 20 | Dylan Walczyk | United States | 77.90 | 77.24 | |
| 20 | 13 | Choi Jae-woo | South Korea | 77.86 | 48.89 | |
| 21 | 30 | Jules Escobar | France | 77.24 | 71.19 | |
| 22 | 6 | Troy Murphy | United States | 76.61 | 76.22 | |
| 23 | 17 | Daichi Hara | Japan | 74.34 | 76.41 | |
| 24 | 26 | Nobuyuki Nishi | Japan | 75.36 | 74.66 | |
| 25 | 38 | Andrey Makhnev | Russia | 75.02 | 47.76 | |
| 26 | 35 | Julius Garbe | Germany | 73.49 | 74.45 | |
| 27 | 34 | Pavel Kolmakov | Kazakhstan | 72.96 | 73.85 | |
| 28 | 18 | Sho Endo | Japan | 73.68 | 73.76 | |
| 29 | 33 | James Matheson | Australia | 73.13 | 73.14 | |
| 30 | 31 | Egor Anufriev | Russia | 72.38 | | |
| 31 | 42 | Evgeniy Gedrovich | Russia | 71.88 | | |
| 32 | 25 | Seo Myung-joon | South Korea | 71.63 | | |
| 33 | 37 | Topi Kanninen | Finland | 71.09 | | |
| 34 | 21 | Laurent Dumais | Canada | 69.05 | | |
| 35 | 36 | Olli Penttala | Finland | 68.06 | | |
| 36 | 45 | Albin Holmgren | Sweden | 67.23 | | |
| 37 | 50 | Oleg Tsinn | Kazakhstan | 60.38 | | |
| 38 | 44 | Daniel Honzig | Czech Republic | 59.59 | | |
| 39 | 43 | Yang Zhao | China | 58.46 | | |
| 40 | 49 | Suning Ning | China | 54.15 | | |
| 41 | 53 | Martin Romero | Spain | 50.38 | | |
| 42 | 41 | Mingwei Dong | China | 46.94 | | |
| 43 | 51 | Jannick Fjeldsoe | Denmark | 46.71 | | |
| 44 | 22 | Walter Wallberg | Sweden | 45.67 | | |
| 45 | 52 | Sergiy Chmel | Ukraine | 38.02 | | |
| 46 | 38 | Chen Kang | China | 31.84 | | |
| 47 | 46 | Oskar Elofsson | Sweden | 18.67 | | |
| 48 | 48 | Oleh Masyra | Ukraine | 17.41 | | |
| | 32 | Kim Ji-hyon | South Korea | DNF | | |
| | 40 | Dmitriy Barmashov | Kazakhstan | DNF | | |
| | 47 | Loke Nilsson | Sweden | DNF | | |

== Final ==
The following are the results of the finals.

| Rank | Bib | Name | Country | Final 1 | Final 2 |
|---|---|---|---|---|---|
| 1st place, gold medalist(s) | 19 | Ikuma Horishima | Japan | 85.96 | 88.54 |
| 2nd place, silver medalist(s) | 2 | Benjamin Cavet | France | 84.34 | 87.11 |
| 3rd place, bronze medalist(s) | 1 | Mikaël Kingsbury | Canada | 86.59 | 82.85 |
| 4 | 14 | Marco Tadé | Switzerland | 83.18 | 82.64 |
| 5 | 7 | Bradley Wilson | United States | 83.60 | 80.56 |
| 6 | 15 | Anthony Benna | France | 83.19 | 80.11 |
| 7 | 27 | Vinjar Slatten | Norway | 82.67 | |
| 8 | 11 | Sacha Theocharis | France | 81.60 | |
| 9 | 16 | Thomas Rowley | United States | 81.54 | |
| 10 | 26 | Marc-Antoine Gagnon | Canada | 80.86 | |
| 11 | 8 | Brodie Summers | Australia | 79.58 | |
| 12 | 12 | Jimi Salonen | Finland | 79.28 | |
| 13 | 23 | Jussi Penttala | Finland | 79.24 | |
| 14 | 3 | Matt Graham | Australia | 78.09 | |
| 15 | 28 | Rohan Chapman-Davies | Australia | 76.93 | |
| 16 | 4 | Philippe Marquis | Canada | 75.67 | |
| 17 | 24 | Tevje Lie Andersen | Norway | 75.12 | |
| 18 | 5 | Dmitriy Reiherd | Kazakhstan | 74.98 | |
