= FIS Freestyle Ski and Snowboarding World Championships 2021 – Men's moguls =

Men's moguls at the FIS Freestyle Ski and Snowboarding World Championships 2021
- Venue: Shymbulak
- Location: Almaty, Kazakhstan
- Date: 8 March
- Competitors: 46 from 15 nations
- Winning points: 87.36

Medalists
gold medal	Mikaël Kingsbury	Canada
silver medal	Benjamin Cavet	France
bronze medal	Pavel Kolmakov	Kazakhstan

The Men's moguls competition at the FIS Freestyle Ski and Snowboarding World Championships 2021 was held on 8 March 2021.

== Qualification ==
The qualification was started at 12:15. The best 18 skiers qualified for the final.

Rank	Bib	Start order	Name	Country	Q1	Q2	Notes
1	2	10	Benjamin Cavet	France	84.95		Q
2	6	8	Mikaël Kingsbury	Canada	82.34		Q
3	5	7	Brodie Summers	Australia	79.99		Q
4	9	18	Nick Page	United States	79.59		Q
5	17	20	Cooper Woods-Topalovic	Australia	78.41		Q
6	12	29	Dmitriy Reikherd	Kazakhstan	76.32		Q
7	8	16	Bradley Wilson	United States	75.69		Q
8	25	2	Laurent Dumais	Canada	75.32		Q
9	13	15	Sacha Theocharis	France	75.08		Q
10	10	22	Dylan Walczyk	United States	73.21	77.53	Q
11	33	38	Olli Penttala	Finland	58.49	77.31	Q
12	18	30	Pavel Kolmakov	Kazakhstan	70.09	77.27	Q
13	35	32	Nikita Novitckii	Russian Ski Federation	74.09	77.07	Q
14	28	26	Albin Holmgren	Sweden	73.25	76.35	Q
15	11	9	Brenden Kelly	Canada	74.40	75.70	Q
16	26	27	Felix Elofsson	Sweden	67.42	74.88	Q
17	3	11	Ludvig Fjällström	Sweden	56.94	74.77	Q
18	31	14	Martin Suire	France	70.84	74.74	Q
19	4	21	Ikuma Horishima	Japan	69.36	74.72	
20	1	25	Matt Graham	Australia	73.07	74.49	
21	37	12	Thomas Gerken Schofield	Great Britain	71.58	74.41	
22	22	24	Kerrian Chunlaud	Canada	69.54	74.22	
23	43	44	Mikhail Aleynikov	Russian Ski Federation	73.92	70.94	
24	23	17	William Feneley	Great Britain	70.14	73.78	
25	29	6	Artem Shuldyakov	Russian Ski Federation	11.80	73.71	
26	14	4	Oskar Elofsson	Sweden	73.06	69.61	
27	15	5	Kosuke Sugimoto	Japan	72.88	70.90	
28	19	23	Jimi Salonen	Finland	72.84	DNF	
29	34	35	Jules Escobar	France	71.64	72.27	
30	32	41	Takashi Koyama	Japan	DNF	72.01	
31	7	3	Marco Tadé	Switzerland	71.29	71.91	
32	46	36	Mateo Jeannesson	Great Britain	69.57	71.10	
33	21	19	Gabriel Dufresne	Canada	70.26	70.65	
34	27	13	James Matheson	Australia	42.74	70.64	
35	30	34	Alex Lewis	United States	68.71	70.37	
36	45	45	Jung Dae-yoon	South Korea	68.69	25.35	
37	38	33	Goshin Fujiki	Japan	66.22	67.40	
38	42	43	Anton Bondarev	Kazakhstan	66.70	61.39	
39	41	46	Sergey Romanov	Kazakhstan	64.76	DNF	
40	20	28	Jussi Penttala	Finland	64.67	53.18	
41	36	31	Akseli Ahvenainen	Finland	51.01	63.78	
42	39	42	Max Willis	Great Britain	63.70	DNF	
43	40	39	Massimo Bellucci	Italy	59.58	53.31	
44	44	37	Artur Yeremenko	Ukraine	47.20	DNF	
45	24	1	Nikita Andreev	Russian Ski Federation	DNF	35.45	
46	47	40	Andrés Valencia	Mexico	DNF	24.06	

== Final ==
The final was started at 15:30.

Rank	Bib	Name	Country	Final 1	Final 2
1st place, gold medalist(s)	6	Mikaël Kingsbury	Canada	85.34	87.36
2nd place, silver medalist(s)	2	Benjamin Cavet	France	82.87	82.43
3rd place, bronze medalist(s)	18	Pavel Kolmakov	Kazakhstan	84.09	82.23
4	35	Nikita Novitckii	Russian Ski Federation	81.08	81.34
5	12	Dmitriy Reikherd	Kazakhstan	82.10	78.47
6	25	Laurent Dumais	Canada	80.01	56.05
7	3	Ludvig Fjällström	Sweden	78.98	—N/a
8	33	Olli Penttala	Finland	77.44	—N/a
9	13	Sacha Theocharis	France	77.32	—N/a
10	10	Dylan Walczyk	United States	77.20	—N/a
11	28	Albin Holmgren	Sweden	76.64	—N/a
12	26	Felix Elofsson	Sweden	76.28	—N/a
13	8	Bradley Wilson	United States	75.67	—N/a
14	31	Martin Suire	France	75.32	—N/a
15	17	Cooper Woods-Topalovic	Australia	74.24	—N/a
16	5	Brodie Summers	Australia	71.61	—N/a
17	11	Brenden Kelly	Canada	71.58	—N/a
18	9	Nick Page	United States	DNF	—N/a
