= FIS Freestyle Ski and Snowboarding World Championships 2019 – Men's moguls =

Men's moguls at the FIS Freestyle Ski and Snowboarding World Championships 2019
- Venue: Deer Valley
- Location: Utah, United States
- Dates: February 8
- Competitors: 44 from 14 nations
- Winning points: 84.89

Medalists
gold medal	Mikaël Kingsbury	Canada
silver medal	Matt Graham	Australia
bronze medal	Daichi Hara	Japan

The Men's moguls competition at the FIS Freestyle Ski and Snowboarding World Championships 2019 was held on February 8, 2019.

== Qualification ==
The qualification was started at 15:25. The best 18 skiers qualified for the final.

Rank	Bib	Start order	Name	Country	Q1	Q2	Notes
1	1	12	Mikaël Kingsbury	Canada	81.29		Q
2	4	19	Ikuma Horishima	Japan	80.83		Q
3	7	3	Daichi Hara	Japan	78.88		Q
4	2	16	Benjamin Cavet	France	78.77		Q
5	3	25	Walter Wallberg	Sweden	77.42		Q
6	5	17	Matt Graham	Australia	77.02		Q
7	19	7	Hunter Bailey	United States	76.46		Q
8	14	24	Ludvig Fjällström	Sweden	75.13		Q
9	8	22	Bradley Wilson	United States	74.21		Q
10	18	1	Philippe Marquis	Canada	73.52	74.30	Q
11	20	21	Dylan Walczyk	United States	74.04	19.59	Q
12	10	8	Jimi Salonen	Finland	73.80	66.58	Q
13	13	28	Pavel Kolmakov	Kazakhstan	72.80	19.51	Q
14	29	4	Rohan Chapman-Davies	Australia	70.30	72.39	Q
15	30	23	Max Willis	Great Britain	23.94	72.25	Q
16	23	26	Motoki Shikata	Japan	72.10	71.16	Q
17	26	11	Goshin Fujiki	Japan	70.38	71.45	Q
18	28	15	Andrey Makhnev	Russia	71.31	27.66	Q
19	9	10	Casey Andringa	United States	70.86	71.08	
20	16	6	Jules Escobar	France	70.94	DNF	
21	12	30	Oskar Elofsson	Sweden	70.81	45.57	
22	27	20	Thomas Gerken Schofield	Great Britain	70.15	67.83	
23	15	18	Felix Elofsson	Sweden	69.83	66.79	
24	11	5	Laurent Dumais	Canada	69.36	DNF	
25	22	29	Brenden Kelly	Canada	69.25	66.58	
26	24	14	Nikita Novitsky	Russia	69.21	36.95	
27	21	27	Brodie Summers	Australia	68.92	66.90	
28	36	40	Jussi Penttala	Finland	68.20	56.51	
29	34	35	Seo Myung-joon	South Korea	65.92	DNF	
30	17	13	James Matheson	Australia	65.77	41.65	
31	46	32	Nikita Parkachev	Russia	63.84	8.30	
32	37	34	Topi Kanninen	Finland	62.97	DNF	
33	42	44	Alexandr Gebert	Kazakhstan	62.50	25.13	
34	31	9	Ilya Chevsky	Russia	20.53	61.03	
35	40	37	Wil Willis	Great Britain	DNF	60.12	
36	39	39	Zhao Yang	China	43.76	51.44	
37	35	41	Daniel Honzig	Czech Republic	47.08	43.33	
38	38	42	Chen Kang	China	36.66	42.06	
39	44	38	Mathew Retzer	Czech Republic	39.14	40.38	
40	41	33	Oleh Masyra	Ukraine	14.39	38.33	
41	45	43	Dong Mingwei	China	38.14	DNF	
42	47	31	Wang Haoran	China	4.47	27.74	
43	32	2	Sergey Romanov	Kazakhstan	22.95	8.29	
	43	36	William Feneley	Great Britain	Did not finish		

== Final ==
The final was started at 19:30.

Rank	Bib	Name	Country	Final 1	Final 2
1st place, gold medalist(s)	1	Mikaël Kingsbury	Canada	83.60	84.89
2nd place, silver medalist(s)	5	Matt Graham	Australia	82.97	81.94
3rd place, bronze medalist(s)	7	Daichi Hara	Japan	79.06	81.66
4	4	Ikuma Horishima	Japan	81.29	81.30
5	2	Benjamin Cavet	France	81.38	81.02
6	18	Philippe Marquis	Canada	79.64	79.50
7	10	Jimi Salonen	Finland	78.46	
8	20	Dylan Walczyk	United States	76.29	
9	3	Walter Wallberg	Sweden	75.89	
10	23	Motoki Shikata	Japan	74.68	
11	28	Andrey Makhnev	Russia	73.57	
12	19	Hunter Bailey	United States	71.45	
13	26	Goshin Fujiki	Japan	70.63	
14	29	Rohan Chapman-Davies	Australia	70.47	
15	30	Max Willis	Great Britain	67.62	
16	13	Pavel Kolmakov	Kazakhstan	47.57	
17	8	Bradley Wilson	United States	45.78	
18	14	Ludvig Fjällström	Sweden	38.12	
