= Freestyle skiing at the 2022 Winter Olympics – Men's moguls =

Men's moguls at the XXIV Olympic Winter Games
- Freestyle skiing
- Venue: Genting Snow Park, Zhangjiakou
- Date: 3, 5 February 2022
- Competitors: 30 from 12 nations
- Winning score: 83.23

Medalists
1st place, gold medalist(s)		Walter Wallberg	Sweden
2nd place, silver medalist(s)		Mikaël Kingsbury	Canada
3rd place, bronze medalist(s)		Ikuma Horishima	Japan

The men's moguls competition in freestyle skiing at the 2022 Winter Olympics were held on 3 February (qualification) and 5 February (final), at the Genting Snow Park in Zhangjiakou. Walter Wallberg of Sweden won the event. Mikaël Kingsbury of Canada became the silver medalist, and Ikuma Horishima from Japan took the bronze. For Wallberg and Horishima this was their first Olympic medal.

The defending champion was Mikaël Kingsbury. The 2018 silver medalist, Matt Graham and the bronze medalist, Daichi Hara, qualified for the Olympics as well. At the 2021–22 FIS Freestyle Ski World Cup, Kingsbury led the ranking before the Olympics, closely followed by Ikuma Horishima. Kingsbury is also the 2021 world champion, with Benjamin Cavet and Pavel Kolmakov being the silver and third medalists, respectively.

== Qualification ==
A total of 30 moguls athletes qualified to compete at the games. For an athlete to compete they must have a minimum of 80.00 FIS points on the FIS Points List on January 17, 2022, and a top 30 finish in a World Cup event or at the FIS Freestyle Ski World Championships 2021. A country could enter a maximum of four athletes into the event.

== Results ==
=== Qualifications ===
==== Qualifying 1 ====
In the first qualifying round, the ten best athletes directly qualified for the final. The bottom twenty athletes go on to compete in the second qualification round.

Rank	Bib	Order	Name	Country	Time	Score			Total	Notes
Rank	Bib	Order	Name	Country	Time	Turns	Air	Time	Total	Notes
1	1	24	Mikaël Kingsbury	Canada	24.71	50.3	15.44	15.41	81.15	QF
2	3	5	Walter Wallberg	Sweden	24.16	49.6	13.38	16.14	79.12	QF
3	9	6	Benjamin Cavet	France	23.52	48.4	13.02	16.98	78.40	QF
4	11	15	Jimi Salonen	Finland	24.30	45.3	15.13	15.96	76.39	QF
5	15	3	Cole McDonald	United States	25.41	47.0	14.78	14.49	76.27	QF
6	4	19	Kosuke Sugimoto	Japan	25.00	48.0	13.23	15.03	76.26	QF
7	6	29	Ludvig Fjällström	Sweden	25.69	48.3	13.78	14.12	76.20	QF
8	7	10	Daichi Hara	Japan	25.23	47.3	14.08	14.73	76.11	QF
9	29	2	Olli Penttala	Finland	24.53	45.7	14.60	15.65	75.95	QF
10	16	21	Dylan Walczyk	United States	25.03	47.8	13.07	14.99	75.86	QF
11	8	9	Brodie Summers	Australia	24.46	45.7	14.22	15.74	75.66	
12	28	22	Dmitriy Reiherd	Kazakhstan	25.25	46.8	13.93	14.70	75.43	
13	20	25	Nikita Novitckii	ROC	25.03	45.6	14.12	14.99	74.71	
14	14	12	Cooper Woods-Topalovic	Australia	26.45	45.7	15.83	13.12	74.65	
15	23	8	Marco Tadé	Switzerland	25.03	46.3	13.19	14.99	74.48	
16	2	16	Ikuma Horishima	Japan	25.38	46.2	13.67	14.53	74.40	
17	5	1	Pavel Kolmakov	Kazakhstan	24.85	43.7	15.16	15.23	74.09	
18	19	11	So Matsuda	Japan	25.71	45.2	14.05	14.10	73.35	
19	21	14	Felix Elofsson	Sweden	25.18	44.4	14.04	14.80	73.24	
20	22	4	James Matheson	Australia	26.10	46.2	12.08	13.58	71.86	
21	10	28	Nick Page	United States	24.36	41.2	13.63	15.88	70.71	
22	13	17	Sacha Theocharis	France	24.96	43.0	12.41	15.09	70.50	
23	27	26	Will Feneley	Great Britain	26.69	45.1	12.33	12.80	70.23	
24	17	20	Laurent Dumais	Canada	24.52	41.2	12.89	15.67	69.76	
25	26	30	Severi Vierelä	Finland	26.92	44.1	13.06	12.50	69.66	
26	18	18	Oskar Elofsson	Sweden	25.94	43.9	11.57	13.79	69.26	
27	24	13	Nikita Andreev	ROC	24.15	40.1	11.14	16.15	67.39	
28	30	7	Zhao Yang	China	28.09	41.6	8.91	10.96	61.47	
	12	23	Bradley Wilson	United States	Did Not Finish					
	25	27	Matt Graham	Australia	Did Not Finish					

==== Qualifying 2 ====
In the second qualifying round, the ten best athletes qualify for the final based on that athletes best score from either the athlete's first or second qualifying run. The bottom ten athletes are eliminated.

Rank	Bib	Order	Name	Country	Qual 1	Time	Score			Total	Best	Notes
Rank	Bib	Order	Name	Country	Qual 1	Time	Turns	Air	Time	Total	Best	Notes
1	21	9	Felix Elofsson	Sweden	73.24	25.24	46.8	17.35	14.72	78.87	78.87	QF
2	8	5	Brodie Summers	Australia	75.66	24.71	47.9	14.62	15.41	77.93	77.93	QF
3	10	19	Nick Page	United States	70.71	25.30	45.7	17.02	14.64	77.36	77.36	QF
4	14	7	Cooper Woods-Topalovic	Australia	74.65	24.01	46.4	14.00	16.34	76.74	76.74	QF
5	2	10	Ikuma Horishima	Japan	74.40	25.75	47.6	14.04	14.55	76.19	76.19	QF
6	20	16	Nikita Novitckii	ROC	74.71	25.57	46.5	14.87	14.28	75.65	75.65	QF
7	28	14	Dmitriy Reiherd	Kazakhstan	75.43	25.24	45.7	14.48	14.72	74.90	75.43	QF
8	13	11	Sacha Theocharis	France	70.50	25.56	47.5	13.62	14.29	75.41	75.41	QF
9	24	8	Nikita Andreev	ROC	67.39	24.49	44.4	14.52	15.70	74.62	74.62	QF
10	23	4	Marco Tadé	Switzerland	74.48	25.23	44.1	11.62	14.73	70.45	74.48	QF
11	5	1	Pavel Kolmakov	Kazakhstan	74.09	25.18	42.1	12.64	14.80	69.54	74.09	
12	18	12	Oskar Elofsson	Sweden	69.26	24.85	45.1	13.19	15.23	73.52	73.52	
13	19	6	So Matsuda	Japan	73.35	26.11	43.6	11.87	13.57	69.04	73.35	
14	22	2	James Matheson	Australia	71.86	25.76	45.2	13.97	14.03	73.20	73.20	
15	12	15	Bradley Wilson	United States	DNF	25.29	45.5	12.79	14.65	72.94	72.94	
16	17	13	Laurent Dumais	Canada	69.76	25.32	43.4	13.38	14.61	71.39	71.39	
17	27	17	Will Feneley	Great Britain	70.23	26.45	42.4	12.02	13.12	67.54	70.23	
18	26	20	Severi Vierelä	Finland	69.66	25.58	42.5	12.39	14.27	69.16	69.66	
19	25	18	Matt Graham	Australia	DNF	23.97	37.8	10.94	16.39	65.13	65.13	
20	30	3	Zhao Yang	China	61.47	26.42	42.2	9.59	13.16	64.95	64.95	

=== Final ===
==== Final 1 ====
Rank	Bib	Order	Name	Country	Time	Score			Total	Notes
Rank	Bib	Order	Name	Country	Time	Turns	Air	Time	Total	Notes
1	1	20	Mikaël Kingsbury	Canada	25.30	49.7	17.44	14.64	81.78	QF
2	4	15	Kosuke Sugimoto	Japan	24.41	47.7	15.50	15.81	79.01	QF
3	7	13	Daichi Hara	Japan	24.27	47.6	14.99	16.00	78.59	QF
4	3	19	Walter Wallberg	Sweden	23.63	47.0	14.21	16.84	78.05	QF
5	2	6	Ikuma Horishima	Japan	25.20	48.1	15.04	14.77	77.91	QF
6	9	18	Benjamin Cavet	France	24.26	47.9	13.89	16.01	77.80	QF
7	14	7	Cooper Woods-Topalovic	Australia	24.19	46.7	14.78	16.10	77.58	QF
8	24	2	Nikita Andreev	ROC	24.18	46.5	14.34	16.11	76.95	QF
9	28	4	Dmitriy Reiherd	Kazakhstan	24.78	46.0	15.58	15.32	76.90	QF
10	10	8	Nick Page	United States	25.98	46.3	16.76	13.74	76.80	QF
11	13	3	Sacha Theocharis	France	24.65	46.7	14.40	15.49	76.59	QF
12	8	9	Brodie Summers	Australia	24.40	45.8	14.53	15.82	76.15	QF
13	20	5	Nikita Novitckii	ROC	25.00	46.7	14.15	15.03	75.88	
14	15	16	Cole McDonald	United States	25.29	45.6	15.53	14.65	75.78	
15	6	14	Ludvig Fjällström	Sweden	24.85	46.0	14.14	15.23	75.37	
16	16	11	Dylan Walczyk	United States	25.13	45.0	15.27	14.86	75.13	
17	21	10	Felix Elofsson	Sweden	25.36	45.4	15.01	14.56	74.97	
18	23	1	Marco Tadé	Switzerland	24.48	45.5	13.49	15.72	74.71	
19	29	12	Olli Penttala	Finland	24.39	45.0	13.84	15.84	74.68	
	11	17	Jimi Salonen	Finland	Did Not Finish					

==== Final 2 ====
Rank	Bib	Order	Name	Country	Time	Score			Total	Notes
Rank	Bib	Order	Name	Country	Time	Turns	Air	Time	Total	Notes
1	3	9	Walter Wallberg	Sweden	24.10	47.8	16.31	16.22	80.33	QF
2	1	12	Mikaël Kingsbury	Canada	25.50	48.5	16.72	14.37	79.59	QF
3	2	8	Ikuma Horishima	Japan	25.47	48.6	16.57	14.41	79.58	QF
4	9	7	Benjamin Cavet	France	24.48	47.0	16.10	15.72	78.82	QF
5	14	6	Cooper Woods-Topalovic	Australia	25.02	47.3	14.91	15.01	77.22	QF
6	10	3	Nick Page	United States	25.63	45.5	17.22	14.20	76.92	QF
7	7	10	Daichi Hara	Japan	24.40	46.8	14.20	15.82	76.82	
8	28	4	Dmitriy Reiherd	Kazakhstan	25.32	46.1	16.06	14.61	76.77	
9	4	11	Kosuke Sugimoto	Japan	25.13	46.6	14.27	14.86	75.73	
10	8	1	Brodie Summers	Australia	24.47	44.6	14.67	15.73	75.00	
11	13	2	Sacha Theocharis	France	24.70	43.4	14.57	15.43	73.40	
	24	5	Nikita Andreev	ROC	Did Not Finish					

==== Final 3 ====
Rank	Bib	Order	Name	Country	Time	Score			Total
Rank	Bib	Order	Name	Country	Time	Turns	Air	Time	Total
1st place, gold medalist(s)	3	6	Walter Wallberg	Sweden	23.70	48.8	17.68	16.75	83.23
2nd place, silver medalist(s)	1	5	Mikaël Kingsbury	Canada	25.02	49.6	17.57	15.01	82.18
3rd place, bronze medalist(s)	2	4	Ikuma Horishima	Japan	23.86	47.4	17.54	16.54	81.48
4	9	3	Benjamin Cavet	France	24.60	47.4	16.48	15.56	79.44
5	10	1	Nick Page	United States	25.68	47.6	17.16	14.14	78.90
6	14	2	Cooper Woods-Topalovic	Australia	25.01	47.6	16.26	15.02	78.88
