= Freestyle skiing at the 2018 Winter Olympics – Men's moguls =

Men's moguls at the XXIII Olympic Winter Games
- Venue: Bogwang Phoenix Park, Pyeongchang, South Korea
- Dates: 9 February 2018 (qualification 1); 12 February 2018 (qualification 2 and final)
- Competitors: 29 from 11 nations
- Winning score: 86.63

Medalists
1st place, gold medalist(s)		Mikaël Kingsbury	Canada
2nd place, silver medalist(s)		Matt Graham	Australia
3rd place, bronze medalist(s)		Daichi Hara	Japan

The men's moguls event in freestyle skiing at the 2018 Winter Olympics took place from 9 to 12 February 2018 at the Bogwang Phoenix Park, Pyeongchang, South Korea.

In the victory ceremony, the medals were presented by Tricia Smith, member of the International Olympic Committee, accompanied by Dean Gosper, FIS council member.

== Qualification ==
The top 30 athletes in the Olympic quota allocation list qualified, with a maximum of four athletes per National Olympic Committee (NOC) allowed. All athletes qualifying must also have placed in the top 30 of a FIS World Cup event or the FIS Freestyle Ski and Snowboarding World Championships 2017 during the qualification period (July 1, 2016 to January 21, 2018) and also have a minimum of 80 FIS points to compete. If the host country, South Korea at the 2018 Winter Olympics did not qualify, their chosen athlete would displace the last qualified athlete, granted all qualification criterion was met.

== Results ==
=== Qualification ===
In the first qualifying round, the ten best athletes directly qualified for the final. Others competed in the second qualification round.

==== Qualifying 1 ====
QF — Qualified directly for the final
QS — Qualified for the semifinal
Bib — Bib number
DNF — Did not finish
DNS — Did not start

Rank	Bib	Name	Country	Time	Score			Total	Notes
Rank	Bib	Name	Country	Time	Turns	Air	Time	Total	Notes
1	2	Mikaël Kingsbury	Canada	23.87	53.8	15.75	16.52	86.07	QF
2	4	Alexandr Smyshlyaev	Olympic Athletes from Russia	24.78	54.5	14.11	15.32	83.93	QF
3	18	Dmitriy Reiherd	Kazakhstan	25.08	52.4	13.90	14.93	81.23	QF
4	7	Troy Murphy	United States	25.40	51.7	14.74	14.51	80.95	QF
5	5	Ikuma Horishima	Japan	23.95	49.0	14.93	16.42	80.35	QF
6	1	Daichi Hara	Japan	25.06	49.7	15.36	14.95	80.01	QF
7	17	Pavel Kolmakov	Kazakhstan	25.98	52.1	14.14	13.74	79.98	QF
8	6	Philippe Marquis	Canada	26.12	51.5	12.71	13.56	77.77	QF
9	10	Matt Graham	Australia	24.47	49.1	12.45	15.73	77.28	QF
10	14	Sacha Theocharis	France	24.89	47.7	13.67	15.18	76.55	QF
11	20	Marc-Antoine Gagnon	Canada	26.04	48.0	14.66	13.66	76.32	
12	13	Anthony Benna	France	25.48	48.7	13.18	14.40	76.28	
13	27	Sho Endo	Japan	24.92	47.8	12.79	15.14	75.73	
14	11	Casey Andringa	United States	26.04	46.9	14.69	13.66	75.25	
15	26	Bradley Wilson	United States	24.38	46.3	13.10	15.85	75.25	
16	16	Nobuyuki Nishi	Japan	24.74	47.6	12.19	15.38	75.17	
17	3	Rohan Chapman-Davies	Australia	26.07	48.1	12.24	13.62	73.96	
18	8	Felix Elofsson	Sweden	24.65	46.2	12.16	15.49	73.85	
19	19	Walter Wallberg	Sweden	25.67	47.3	12.16	14.15	73.61	
20	21	Choi Jae-woo	South Korea	24.95	43.0	14.85	15.10	72.95	
21	28	Benjamin Cavet	France	26.40	45.9	13.65	13.19	72.74	
22	29	Emerson Smith	United States	25.41	46.9	11.20	14.49	72.59	
23	12	James Matheson	Australia	26.33	46.2	13.28	12.79	72.27	
24	22	Kim Ji-hyon	South Korea	26.05	43.7	12.50	13.65	69.85	
25	15	Ludvig Fjällström	Sweden	25.07	41.8	11.83	14.94	68.57	
26	25	Seo Myung-joon	South Korea	25.02	44.4	9.04	15.01	68.45	
27	9	Jimi Salonen	Finland	28.48	24.9	7.84	10.44	43.18	
28	30	Jussi Penttala	Finland	27.32	11.3	6.88	11.97	30.15	
	23	Vinjar Slåtten	Norway					DNF	
	24	Brodie Summers	Australia					DNS	

==== Qualifying 2 ====
QF — Qualified for the final
Bib — Bib number
DNF — Did not finish
DNS — Did not start

Rank	Order	Name	Country	Qual 1	Time	Score			Total	Best	Notes
Rank	Order	Name	Country	Qual 1	Time	Turns	Air	Time	Total	Best	Notes
1	11	Choi Jae-woo	South Korea	72.95	25.93	50.1	17.32	13.81	81.23	81.23	QF
2	13	Vinjar Slåtten	Norway	DNF	25.16	47.4	15.27	14.82	77.49	77.49	QF
3	4	Casey Andringa	United States	75.25	25.57	47.8	15.29	14.28	77.37	77.37	QF
4	16	Bradley Wilson	United States	75.25	24.76	47.0	13.98	15.35	76.33	76.33	QF
5	10	Marc-Antoine Gagnon	Canada	76.32	25.40	46.3	15.07	14.51	75.88	76.32	QF
6	6	Anthony Benna	France	76.28	25.45	35.3	10.56	14.44	60.30	76.28	QF
7	17	Sho Endo	Japan	75.73	25.19	47.1	13.50	14.78	75.38	75.73	QF
8	3	Jimi Salonen	Finland	43.18	24.92	45.6	14.51	15.14	75.25	75.25	QF
9	8	Nobuyuki Nishi	Japan	75.17	25.35	48.3	12.28	14.57	75.15	75.17	QF
10	5	James Matheson	Australia	72.27	27.44	48.5	14.29	11.82	74.61	74.61	QF
11	9	Walter Wallberg	Sweden	73.61	25.05	48.8	10.70	14.97	74.47	74.47	
12	1	Rohan Chapman-Davies	Australia	73.96	27.52	44.0	12.23	11.71	67.94	73.96	
13	19	Emerson Smith	United States	72.59	25.43	46.0	13.47	14.47	73.94	73.94	
14	2	Felix Elofsson	Sweden	73.85	25.14	47.6	10.83	14.85	73.28	73.85	
15	18	Benjamin Cavet	France	72.74	25.42	43.2	13.35	14.48	71.03	72.74	
16	7	Ludvig Fjällström	Sweden	68.57	26.51	46.3	11.02	13.04	70.36	70.36	
17	12	Kim Ji-hyon	South Korea	69.85	26.62	42.0	13.27	12.90	68.17	69.85	
18	15	Seo Myung-joon	South Korea	68.45	25.41	42.5	12.52	14.49	69.51	69.51	
19	20	Jussi Penttala	Finland	30.15	27.68	42.5	13.96	11.50	67.96	67.96	
	14	Brodie Summers	Australia	DNS	DNS					DNS	

=== Final ===
The finals were held on 12 February 2018.

==== Final 1 ====
Q — Qualified for next round
DNF — Did not finish

Rank	Order	Name	Country	Time	Score			Total	Notes
Rank	Order	Name	Country	Time	Turns	Air	Time	Total	Notes
1	4	Sho Endo	Japan	24.42	52.1	14.82	15.80	82.72	Q
2	12	Matt Graham	Australia	24.89	50.3	15.91	15.18	81.39	Q
3	15	Daichi Hara	Japan	24.75	51.0	14.93	13.87	81.29	Q
4	20	Mikaël Kingsbury	Canada	24.88	50.7	15.38	15.38	81.27	Q
5	8	Casey Andringa	United States	25.23	49.2	16.80	14.73	80.73	Q
6	18	Dmitriy Reiherd	Kazakhstan	24.70	50.7	13.64	15.43	79.77	Q
7	16	Ikuma Horishima	Japan	24.09	48.0	15.41	16.23	79.64	Q
8	9	Vinjar Slåtten	Norway	24.99	49.1	15.03	15.05	79.18	Q
9	6	Marc-Antoine Gagnon	Canada	25.37	47.5	16.34	14.54	78.38	Q
10	10	Choi Jae-woo	South Korea	24.86	46.5	16.54	15.22	78.26	Q
11	14	Pavel Kolmakov	Kazakhstan	25.88	48.4	15.95	13.87	78.22	Q
12	11	Sacha Theocharis	France	23.97	46.4	14.30	16.39	77.09	Q
13	5	Anthony Benna	France	24.85	47.7	13.50	15.23	76.43	
14	1	James Matheson	Australia	26.33	47.8	14.90	13.28	75.98	
15	19	Alexandr Smyshlyaev	Olympic Athletes from Russia	25.49	47.4	12.78	14.39	74.57	
16	3	Jimi Salonen	Finland	25.16	44.6	13.34	14.82	72.76	
17	17	Troy Murphy	United States	25.36	45.0	13.16	14.56	72.72	
18	7	Bradley Wilson	United States	23.34	34.4	11.12	17.22	62.74	
19	2	Nobuyuki Nishi	Japan	25.14	23.1	8.09	14.85	46.04	
	13	Philippe Marquis	Canada	DNF					

==== Final 2 ====
Q — Qualified for next round
DNF — Did not finish

Rank	Order	Name	Country	Time	Score			Total	Notes
Rank	Order	Name	Country	Time	Turns	Air	Time	Total	Notes
1	10	Daichi Hara	Japan	24.41	51.6	14.89	15.81	82.30	Q
2	9	Mikaël Kingsbury	Canada	25.10	50.4	16.89	14.90	82.19	Q
3	8	Casey Andringa	United States	24.94	49.3	16.39	15.11	80.80	Q
4	11	Matt Graham	Australia	25.18	50.1	15.11	14.80	80.01	Q
5	5	Vinjar Slåtten	Norway	24.31	48.3	14.63	15.94	78.87	Q
6	4	Marc-Antoine Gagnon	Canada	25.53	47.6	15.47	14.33	77.40	Q
7	2	Pavel Kolmakov	Kazakhstan	25.39	46.3	15.28	14.52	76.10	
8	7	Dmitriy Reiherd	Kazakhstan	23.85	30.4	11.69	16.55	58.64	
9	1	Sacha Theocharis	France	25.40	13.3	6.68	14.51	34.49	
	12	Sho Endo	Japan	DNF					
	6	Ikuma Horishima	Japan	DNF					
	3	Choi Jae-woo	South Korea	DNF					

==== Final 3 ====
Rank	Order	Name	Country	Time	Score			Total	Notes
Rank	Order	Name	Country	Time	Turns	Air	Time	Total	Notes
1st place, gold medalist(s)	5	Mikaël Kingsbury	Canada	24.83	54.0	17.37	15.26	86.63	
2nd place, silver medalist(s)	3	Matt Graham	Australia	24.85	50.9	16.44	15.23	82.57	
3rd place, bronze medalist(s)	6	Daichi Hara	Japan	24.90	51.3	15.73	15.16	82.19	
4	1	Marc-Antoine Gagnon	Canada	25.30	46.1	16.28	14.64	77.02	
5	4	Casey Andringa	United States	25.86	45.5	16.10	13.90	75.50	
6	2	Vinjar Slåtten	Norway	26.71	11.8	9.03	12.78	33.61	
