= FIS Freestyle Ski and Snowboarding World Championships 2019 – Men's dual moguls =

Men's dual moguls at the FIS Freestyle Ski and Snowboarding World Championships 2019
- Venue: Deer Valley
- Location: Utah, United States
- Dates: February 9
- Competitors: 44

Medalists
gold medal	Mikaël Kingsbury	Canada
silver medal	Bradley Wilson	United States
bronze medal	Daichi Hara	Japan

The Men's dual moguls competition at the FIS Freestyle Ski and Snowboarding World Championships 2019 was held on February 9, 2019.

== Qualification ==
=== Top half ===
Round of 64
38	(Czech Republic) Mathew Retzer	70.86
24	(United Kingdom) Thomas Gerken Schofield	75.46

Round of 32
1	(Canada) Mikaël Kingsbury	82.82
24	(United Kingdom) Thomas Gerken Schofield	70.93
28	(United Kingdom) Max Willis	79.18
16	(France) Jules Escobar	66.75

Round of 16
1	(Canada) Mikaël Kingsbury	88.67
28	(United Kingdom) Max Willis	37.61

Round of 64
37	(China) Chen Kang	DNF
26	(Canada) Kerrian Chunland	62.63
19	(United States) Hunter Bailey	79.37
43	(China) Wang Haoran	25.65

Round of 32
9	(United States) Casey Andringa	82.42
26	(Canada) Kerrian Chunland	77.33
19	(United States) Hunter Bailey	80.40
8	(Australia) Brodie Summers	37.91

Round of 16
9	(United States) Casey Andringa	82.96
19	(United States) Hunter Bailey	73.31

Round of 64
39	(China) Dong Mingwei	39.69
30	(Kazakhstan) Sergey Romanov	78.37
17	(Japan) Goshin Fujiki	77.35
35	(United Kingdom) William Feneley	DNF

Round of 32
5	(Australia) Matt Graham	85.58
30	(Kazakhstan) Sergey Romanov	DMF
17	(Japan) Goshin Fujiki	68.25
12	(Kazakhstan) Pavel Kolmakov	82.60

Round of 16
5	(Australia) Matt Graham	83.06
12	(Kazakhstan) Pavel Kolmakov	83.10

Round of 64
32	(South Korea) Seo Myung-joon	75.73
36	(China) Zhao Yang	DNF

Round of 32
13	(Sweden) Oskar Elofsson	63.90
22	(Canada) Brenden Kelly	DNF
32	(South Korea) Seo Myung-joon	DNF
4	(Sweden) Walter Wallberg	77.23

Round of 16
13	(Sweden) Oskar Elofsson	78.53
4	(Sweden) Walter Wallberg	80.67

=== Bottom half ===
Round of 64
41	(United Kingdom) Wil Willis	DNF
29	(Russia) Ilya Chevsky	55.91

Round of 32
3	(Japan) Ikuma Horishima	82.66
29	(Russia) Ilya Chevsky	DNF
20	(Japan) Motoki Shikata	78.52
14	(Canada) Laurent Dumais	80.47

Round of 16
3	(Japan) Ikuma Horishima	86.52
14	(Canada) Laurent Dumais	76.05

Round of 64
42	(Kazakhstan) Alexandr Gebert	61.96
25	(Russia) Andrey Makhnev	81.68
23	(Russia) Nikita Novitsky	DNF
34	(Finland) Jussi Penttala	78.17

Round of 32
11	(Finland) Jimi Salonen	29.58
25	(Russia) Andrey Makhnev	80.41
34	(Finland) Jussi Penttala	69.92
6	(United States) Bradley Wilson	79.12

Round of 16
25	(Russia) Andrey Makhnev	77.50
6	(United States) Bradley Wilson	79.59

Round of 64
40	(Czech Republic) Daniel Honzig	58.41
18	(Australia) James Matheson	78.38
27	(Australia) Rohan Chapman-Davies	74.43
33	(Russia) Nikita Parkachev	63.49

Round of 32
7	(Japan) Daichi Hara	72.46
18	(Australia) James Matheson	68.48
27	(Australia) Rohan Chapman-Davies	78.45
10	(Sweden) Ludvig Fjällström	65.90

Round of 16
7	(Japan) Daichi Hara	80.01
27	(Australia) Rohan Chapman-Davies	69.09

Round of 64
31	(Finland) Topi Kanninen	76.64
44	(Ukraine) Oleh Masyra	DNF

Round of 32
15	(Sweden) Felix Elofsson	73.92
21	(United States) Dylan Walczyk	78.62
31	(Finland) Topi Kanninen	25.60
2	(France) Benjamin Cavet	82.04

Round of 16
21	(United States) Dylan Walczyk	DNF
2	(France) Benjamin Cavet	85.39

== Finals ==
Quarterfinals
1	(Canada) Mikaël Kingsbury	86.67
9	(United States) Casey Andringa	77.24
12	(Kazakhstan) Pavel Kolmakov	66.05
4	(Sweden) Walter Wallberg	81.27
3	(Japan) Ikuma Horishima	54.53
6	(United States) Bradley Wilson	83.33
7	(Japan) Daichi Hara	82.39
2	(France) Benjamin Cavet	75.05

Semifinals
1	(Canada) Mikaël Kingsbury	90.90
4	(Sweden) Walter Wallberg	79.54
6	(United States) Bradley Wilson	81.98
7	(Japan) Daichi Hara	DNF

Finals
1	(Canada) Mikaël Kingsbury	87.62
6	(United States) Bradley Wilson	84.69
Third place
4	(Sweden) Walter Wallberg	79.37
7	(Japan) Daichi Hara	83.31
