= FIS Freestyle Ski and Snowboarding World Championships 2015 – Men's dual moguls =

2015 Men's duel mogul skiing competition, qualifiers and final results

The men's dual moguls competition of the FIS Freestyle Ski and Snowboarding World Championships 2015 was held at Kreischberg, Austria on January 19 (qualifying and finals). 44 athletes from 20 countries competed.

== Qualification ==
The following are the results of the qualification.

Rank	Bib	Name	Country	Score	Notes
1	1	Mikaël Kingsbury	Canada	84.72	Q
2	2	Philippe Marquis	Canada	82.88	Q
3	8	Anthony Benna	France	82.67	Q
4	19	Sho Kashima	United States	81.99	Q
5	31	Dmitriy Reiherd	Kazakhstan	81.14	Q
6	9	Marc-Antoine Gagnon	Canada	80.70	Q
7	12	Thomas Rowley	United States	80.16	Q
8	4	Matt Graham	Australia	79.57	Q
9	7	Patrick Deneen	United States	79.34	Q
10	6	Simon Pouliot-Cavanagh	Canada	79.20	Q
11	26	Tevje Lie Andersen	Norway	79.16	Q, Tie: 49.6
12	21	Aleksey Pavlenko	Russia	79.16	Q, Tie: 49.1
13	22	Sora Yoshikawa	Japan	78.96	Q
14	5	Alexandr Smyshlyaev	Russia	78.84	Q
15	14	Jimi Salonen	Finland	78.78	Q
16	20	Jussi Penttala	Finland	78.76	Q
17	28	Vinjar Slatten	Norway	78.65	
18	16	Marco Tadé	Switzerland	78.10	
19	35	Maksim Mikhaylov	Russia	76.76	
20	29	Ludvig Fjallstrom	Sweden	76.67	
21	25	Yohann Seigneur	France	76.46	
22	17	Nobuyuki Nishi	Japan	75.25	
23	33	Sacha Theocharis	France	75.07	
24	34	Pavel Kolmakov	Kazakhstan	74.79	
25	49	Giacomo Matiz	Italy	73.38	
26	40	Felix Elofsson	Sweden	72.46	
27	10	Troy Murphy	United States	69.88	
28	24	Per Spett	Sweden	68.62	
29	41	Kim Ji-hyon	South Korea	68.60	
30	44	Dmitriy Barmashov	Kazakhstan	68.53	
31	39	Arwed Loth	Germany	66.83	
32	48	Felix Pfeiffer	Germany	64.19	
33	50	Daniel Honzig	Czech Republic	63.17	
34	47	Adrien Bouard	Germany	62.60	
35	32	Seo Myung-joon	South Korea	58.75	
36	43	Julius Garbe	Germany	58.74	
37	30	Sergey Volkov	Russia	58.18	
38	42	Thomas Aigner	Austria	46.18	
39	36	Sergiy Chmel	Ukraine	41.96	
	45	Jannick Fjeldsoe	Denmark	DNF	
	46	Andrew Longley	Great Britain	DNF	
	27	Benjamin Cavet	France	DNS	
	37	Sascha Posch	Austria	DNS	
	38	Chen Kang	China	DNF	

== Final ==
The following are the results of the finals.

Round of 16
1	Mikaël Kingsbury (CAN)	27
16	Jussi Penttala (FIN)	8
8	Matt Graham (AUS)	16
9	Patrick Deneen (USA)	19
5	Dmitriy Reiherd (KAZ)	25
12	Aleksey Pavlenko (RUS)	10
4	Sho Kashima (USA)	29
13	Sora Yoshikawa (JPN)	6
3	Anthony Benna (FRA)	10
14	Alexandr Smyshlyaev (RUS)	25
6	Marc-Antoine Gagnon (CAN)	35
11	Tevje Lie Andersen (NOR)	0
7	Thomas Rowley (USA)	23
10	Simon Pouliot-Cavanagh (CAN)	12
2	Philippe Marquis (CAN)	24
15	Jimi Salonen (FIN)	11

Quarterfinals
1	Mikael Kingsbury (CAN)	21
9	Patrick Deneen (USA)	14
5	Dmitriy Reiherd (KAZ)	13
4	Sho Kashima (USA)	22
14	Alexandr Smyshlyaev (RUS)	15
6	Marc-Antoine Gagnon (CAN)	20
7	Thomas Rowley (USA)	16
2	Philippe Marquis (CAN)	19

Semifinals
1	Mikael Kingsbury (CAN)	35
4	Sho Kashima (USA)	0
6	Marc-Antoine Gagnon (CAN)	17
2	Philippe Marquis (CAN)	18

Finals
1	Mikael Kingsbury (CAN)	20 (gold)
2	Philippe Marquis (CAN)	15 (silver)
Third place
4	Sho Kashima (USA)
6	Marc-Antoine Gagnon (CAN)	W/O (bronze)
