= Freestyle skiing at the 2017 Asian Winter Games – Men's dual moguls =

Men's dual moguls at the 2017 Asian Winter Games
- Venue: Bankei Ski Area
- Dates: 24 February 2017
- Competitors: 18 from 6 nations

Medalists
gold medal	Ikuma Horishima	Japan
silver medal	Daichi Hara	Japan
bronze medal	Dmitriy Reiherd	Kazakhstan

The men's dual moguls at the 2017 Asian Winter Games was held on 24 February 2017 at Bankei Ski Area in Sapporo, Japan.

== Schedule ==
All times are Japan Standard Time (UTC+09:00)

Date	Time	Event
Friday, 24 February 2017	10:10	Qualification
Friday, 24 February 2017	12:00	Finals

== Results ==
Legend

- DNF — Did not finish

=== Qualification ===
Rank	Athlete	Score
1	Dmitriy Reiherd (KAZ)	81.90
2	Choi Jae-woo (KOR)	81.23
3	Seo Myung-joon (KOR)	79.45
4	Motoki Shikata (JPN)	78.19
5	Ikuma Horishima (JPN)	77.53
6	Kim Ji-hyon (KOR)	76.78
7	Daichi Hara (JPN)	75.32
8	Cooper Woods-Topalovic (AUS)	74.04
9	Dmitriy Barmashov (KAZ)	73.65
10	Pavel Kolmakov (KAZ)	73.22
11	Kosuke Sugimoto (JPN)	73.04
12	Ben Matsumoto (AUS)	60.85
13	Guo Xiangru (CHN)	43.55
14	Wang Haoran (CHN)	30.89
15	Ning Suning (CHN)	27.19
16	Bayanmönkhiin Orkhontamir (MGL)	0.70
17	Ragchaagiin Tüvshinbayar (MGL)	0.56
—	Shi Songhao (CHN)	DNF

=== Knockout round ===
1/8 finals
1	Dmitriy Reiherd (KAZ)	25
16	Bayanmönkhiin Orkhontamir (MGL)	DNF
9	Dmitriy Barmashov (KAZ)	17
8	Cooper Woods-Topalovic (AUS)	8
5	Ikuma Horishima (JPN)	25
12	Ben Matsumoto (AUS)	0
13	Guo Xiangru (CHN)	DNF
4	Motoki Shikata (JPN)	25
3	Seo Myung-joon (KOR)	24
14	Wang Haoran (CHN)	1
11	Kosuke Sugimoto (JPN)	15
6	Kim Ji-hyon (KOR)	10
7	Daichi Hara (JPN)	14
10	Pavel Kolmakov (KAZ)	11
15	Ning Suning (CHN)	DNF
2	Choi Jae-woo (KOR)	25

Quarterfinals
1	Dmitriy Reiherd (KAZ)	16
9	Dmitriy Barmashov (KAZ)	9
5	Ikuma Horishima (JPN)	18
4	Motoki Shikata (JPN)	7
3	Seo Myung-joon (KOR)	25
11	Kosuke Sugimoto (JPN)	DNF
7	Daichi Hara (JPN)	15
2	Choi Jae-woo (KOR)	10

Semifinals
1	Dmitriy Reiherd (KAZ)	12
5	Ikuma Horishima (JPN)	13
3	Seo Myung-joon (KOR)	DNF
7	Daichi Hara (JPN)	25

Final
5	Ikuma Horishima (JPN)	16
7	Daichi Hara (JPN)	9
Small final
1	Dmitriy Reiherd (KAZ)	14
3	Seo Myung-joon (KOR)	11
