= Freestyle skiing at the 2017 Asian Winter Games – Men's moguls =

Men's moguls at the 2017 Asian Winter Games
- Venue: Bankei Ski Area
- Dates: 26 February 2017
- Competitors: 19 from 7 nations

Medalists
gold medal	Ikuma Horishima	Japan
silver medal	Choi Jae-woo	South Korea
bronze medal	Dmitriy Reiherd	Kazakhstan

The men's moguls at the 2017 Asian Winter Games was held on 26 February 2017 at Bankei Ski Area in Sapporo, Japan.

== Schedule ==
All times are Japan Standard Time (UTC+09:00)

Date	Time	Event
Sunday, 26 February 2017	11:15	Qualification
Sunday, 26 February 2017	13:15	Final 1
Sunday, 26 February 2017	13:35	Final 2

== Results ==
Legend

- DSQ — Disqualified

=== Qualification ===
Rank	Athlete	Score
1	Dmitriy Reiherd (KAZ)	85.21
2	Daichi Hara (JPN)	82.80
3	Kim Ji-hyon (KOR)	81.71
4	Ikuma Horishima (JPN)	81.38
5	Choi Jae-woo (KOR)	81.15
6	Pavel Kolmakov (KAZ)	79.16
7	Dmitriy Barmashov (KAZ)	79.09
8	Kosuke Sugimoto (JPN)	78.13
9	Motoki Shikata (JPN)	77.86
10	Seo Myung-joon (KOR)	76.81
11	Cooper Woods-Topalovic (AUS)	76.61
12	Ben Matsumoto (AUS)	66.50
13	Ning Suning (CHN)	62.23
14	Shi Songhao (CHN)	58.47
15	Wang Haoran (CHN)	56.86
16	Guo Xiangru (CHN)	55.90
17	Bayanmönkhiin Orkhontamir (MGL)	10.60
18	Ragchaagiin Tüvshinbayar (MGL)	1.13
—	Robert Worachai Pinsent (THA)	DSQ

=== Final 1 ===
Rank	Athlete	Score
1	Ikuma Horishima (JPN)	85.79
2	Dmitriy Reiherd (KAZ)	85.38
3	Choi Jae-woo (KOR)	84.63
4	Motoki Shikata (JPN)	84.48
5	Seo Myung-joon (KOR)	82.85
6	Daichi Hara (JPN)	82.23
7	Kosuke Sugimoto (JPN)	82.10
8	Kim Ji-hyon (KOR)	81.04
9	Dmitriy Barmashov (KAZ)	73.32
10	Pavel Kolmakov (KAZ)	71.62

=== Final 2 ===
Rank	Athlete	Score
1st place, gold medalist(s)	Ikuma Horishima (JPN)	90.35
2nd place, silver medalist(s)	Choi Jae-woo (KOR)	88.55
3rd place, bronze medalist(s)	Dmitriy Reiherd (KAZ)	85.69
4	Daichi Hara (JPN)	84.06
5	Motoki Shikata (JPN)	83.92
6	Seo Myung-joon (KOR)	80.87
