= Cole McDonald (skier) =

American freestyle skier (born 2003)

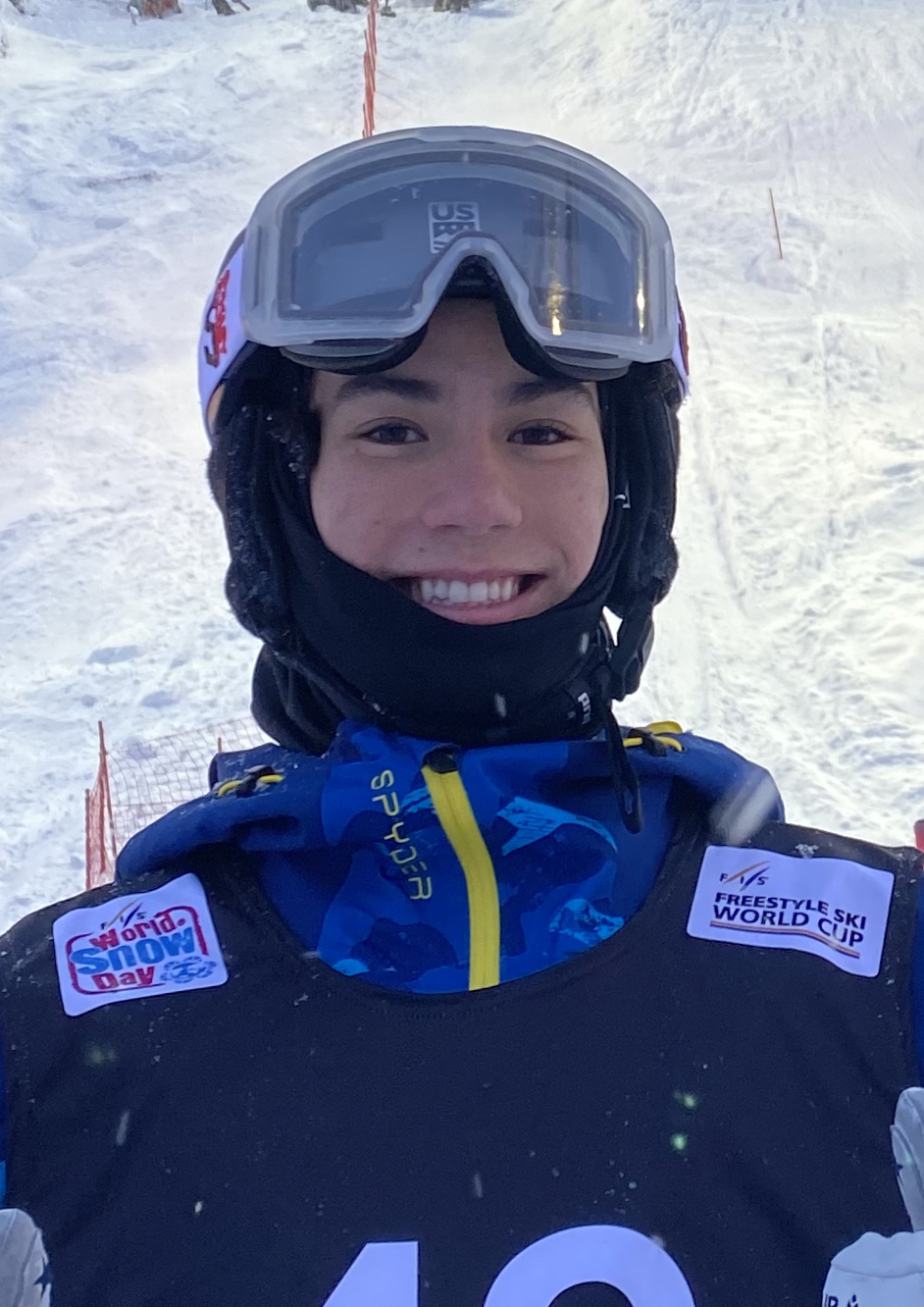
- McDonald in 2021

Personal information
- Born: March 6, 2003 (age 23) Salt Lake City, Utah, U.S.
- Height: 6 ft 0 in (1.82 m)

Skiing career
- Sport: Alpine skiing
- Club: Wasatch Freestyle
- Disciplines: Freestyle skiing, Moguls
- World Cup debut: Ruka, Finland, December 4, 2021 (5th place; age 18)

Olympics
- Teams: 1 (2022)

World Cup
- Seasons: 1

Cole McDonald (born March 6, 2003) is an American freestyle skier. He joined the US Ski & Snowboard's U.S. Freestyle Ski Team (Development Team) in July 2021. In the same season as his first World Cup, he earned a spot on the U.S. Men's Moguls Team at the 2022 Winter Olympics in Beijing, making him the youngest American male mogul skier to participate in the Olympics at 18 years of age. McDonald was named World Cup Rookie of the Year in 2022.

== Career ==
=== Early years ===
McDonald was introduced to mogul skiing in his hometown of Park City, Utah when he joined Wasatch Freestyle at the age of seven. "When I'm not skiing moguls, I'm skiing moguls in my head," he said in a video from Wasatch Freestyle. He quickly took to the sport and ramped up accolades over the years.

Before making the U.S. Ski Team, some of the more recent accolades include a third-place finish at the 2021 U.S. Freestyle Moguls National Championships at Snowbird, Utah; second place at the 2020 NorAm Cup at Val St-Come in Canada; third place finish at Calgary, Canada, at the 2020 NorAm Cup; and first place in Singles at the 2020 U.S. Jr Nationals at Winter Park, Colorado.

Thus far, he has accumulated nineteen Top 10 finishes and five FIS podiums, including his best World Cup finish: 4th place in dual moguls at Alpe d'Huez in 2021.

McDonald was selected to forerun the FIS World Cup at Deer Valley Resort in Park City, Utah—his hometown—from 2017-2021. On January 13–14, 2022, McDonald returned as a competitor in the World Cup circuit.

Growing up, he watched videos of accomplished skiers, such as Canadians Mikael Kingsbury and Alexandre Bilodeau, in order to reform his own technique and achieve his Olympic dreams.

McDonald graduated from The Winter Sports School in 2020. The following year, on July 16, 2021, McDonald was named to the U.S. Freestyle Mogul Ski Team's Development Team (D Team), the first of its kind. McDonald's nomination for the team was based on his 11th FIS points list of the 2021 season for FIS junior age-eligible athletes.

=== World Cup debut ===
McDonald earned first place at the FIS open mogul competition at Idre Fjall in Sweden on November 21, 2021, which extended him his first World Cup start. It was a historic event with a "record-breaking number of participants," according to the International Ski Federation (FIS).

In December 2021, he made his official World Cup debut at Ruka, Finland as the youngest competitor, leading the United States with a fifth-place finish. Throughout the World Cup circuit, announcers labeled McDonald as a "youngster" and "unheralded." Mogul skier and 2014 Winter Olympian Ludvig Fjällströ also described McDonald as a "tall American" after his first-place finish at Idre.

McDonald bested his Ruka opening at Alpe D'Huez in France on December 18, 2021. He ranked 4th place in dual moguls and competed directly with top-ranked mogul skiers, including Kingsbury and Ikuma Horishima of Japan—the latter with whom he dueled in the small finals. He came in fourth behind Kingsbury, Water Wallberg of Sweden, and Horishima, respectively.

McDonald's top finishes in the five World Cup starts earned him a spot on the 2022 Winter Olympic Team.

McDonald received the FIS World Cup Rookie of The Year award for the 2021/2022 season. The US Freestyle Dual Moguls Team also took home the overall Nations Cup. McDonald rounded out the season with a first place men's moguls finish at the FIS Freestyle Junior World Championships at Chiesa in Valmalenco.

=== 2022 Winter Olympics ===
After a solid first World Cup season, McDonald secured his spot on Team USA headed for the 2022 Beijing Olympics. At 18 years old, McDonald is the youngest American male mogul skier to attend the Olympics. McDonald's accelerated success and good fortune spanned over the course of just 185 days. He was named onto the US Freestyle Ski Development Team on July 16, 2021, and then made the U.S. Team for the 2022 Olympic Games on January 17, 2022, after receiving a phone call from his coach. The formal announcement was made on January 21, 2022. At the start of the 2021/2022 season, McDonald was ranked 64th in the world by the FIS Committee. He was ranked 11th when he was appointed to Team USA. Bradley Wilson (now three-time Olympian: 2014, 2018, and 2022), Nick Page, and Dylan Walczyk joined McDonald in Beijing for the 2022 Winter Olympics.

This rise to the global spotlight is akin to freestyle skier Bryon Wilson's journey. Wilson had a strong start at the World Cup in 2010 with two second-place finishes before being named to the US team for the 2010 Winter Olympics in Vancouver; he earned a bronze medal.

McDonald made his Olympic debut on February 3, 2022, at the first Men's Moguls Qualification round. He placed fifth out with a score of 76.27, which secured him in the finals. He placed highest among the US men's team in his first event.

McDonald finished 14th overall.

== Personal life ==
McDonald is of Vietnamese descent through his mother.

== Results ==
World Cup Results (2021/2022)
Date	Location	Category	Discipline	FIS Points	Cup Points	Final position
04-12-2021	Ruka, FIN	Open	Moguls	450.00	45.00	5
10-12-2021	Idre Fjall, SWE	Qualification	Moguls	-	-	48
11-12-2021	Idre Fjall, SWE	World Cup	Moguls	16.10	-	48
12-12-2021	Idre Fjall, SWE	World Cup	Dual Moguls	110.00	11.00	20
16-12-2021	Alpe D'Huez, FRA	Qualification	Moguls			8
17-12-2021	Alpe D'Huez, FRA	World Cup	Moguls	150.00	15.00	16
18-12-2021	Alpe D'Huez, FRA	World Cup	Dual Moguls	500.00	50.00	4
07-01-2022	Mont Tremblant, CAN	World Cup	Moguls	150.00	15.00	16
08-01-2022	Mont Tremblant, CAN	World Cup	Moguls	100.00	10.00	21
13-01-2022	Deer Valley, UT USA	World Cup	Moguls	180.00	18.00	14
14-01-2022	Deer Valley, UT USA	World Cup	Moguls	160.00	16.00	15
12-03-2022	Chiesa in Valmalenco, ITA	World Cup	Dual Moguls	400.00	40.00	6
18-03-2022	Megève, FRA	World Cup	Moguls	200.00	20.00	13
19-03-2022	Megève, FRA	World Cup	Dual Moguls		32.00	8

Top 10 Finishes
Date	Location	Event	Discipline	Result
28-03-2022	Chiesa in Valmalenco, ITA	FIS Junior World Ski Championships	Dual Moguls	5
25-03-2022	Chiesa in Valmalenco, ITA	FIS Junior World Ski Championships	Moguls	1
19-03-2022	Megève, FRA	World Cup	Dual Moguls	8
12-03-2022	Chiesa in Valmalenco, ITA	World Cup	Dual Moguls	6
03-02-2022	Beijing, CHN	Olympic Qualification	Moguls	5
18-12-2021	Alpe d'Huez FRA	World Cup	Dual Moguls	4
16-12-2021	Alpe d'Huez FRA	Qualification	Moguls	8
04-12-2021	Ruka FIN	World Cup	Moguls	5
21-11-2021	Idre Fjall SWE	Open	Moguls	1
20-11-2021	Idre Fjall SWE	Open	Moguls	5
26-03-2021	Snowbird Ski, UT USA	National Championships	Dual Moguls	3
10-02-2021	Deer Valley Resort, UT USA	Open	Moguls	2
28-01-2021	Winter Park Resort, CO USA	FIS	Moguls	5
27-01-2021	Winter Park Resort, CO USA	FIS	Moguls	10
01-03-2020	Val St-Come, QC CAN	Nor-Am	Dual Moguls	2
23-02-2020	Calgary, AB CAN	Nor-Am	Dual Moguls	3
22-02-2020	Calgary, AB CAN	Nor-Am	Moguls	8
12-01-2020	Steamboat Ski, CO USA	Open	Dual Moguls	9
11-01-2020	Steamboat Ski, CO USA	Open	Moguls	5
17-03-2019	Waterville Valley Resort, VT USA	National Championships	Dual Moguls	9
16-03-2019	Waterville Valley Resort, VT USA	National Championships	Moguls	8
03-03-2019	Apex Mountain, BC CAN	Nor-Am Cup	Dual Moguls	7
24-02-2019	Steamboat Ski, CO USA	Nor-Am Cup	Dual Moguls	7
03-02-2019	Stratton Mountain, VT USA	Nor-Am Cup	Dual Moguls	9
