= Freestyle skiing at the 2011 Asian Winter Games – Men's dual moguls =

Men's dual moguls at the 2011 Asian Winter Games
- Venue: Tabagan Sport and Recreation Complex
- Dates: 3 February 2011
- Competitors: 8 from 4 nations

Medalists
| gold medal | Dmitriy Barmashov | Kazakhstan |
| silver medal | Osamu Ueno | Japan |
| bronze medal | Yugo Tsukita | Japan |

The men's dual moguls at the 2011 Asian Winter Games was held on 3 February 2011 at Tabagan Sport and Recreation Complex in Almaty, Kazakhstan.

== Schedule ==
All times are Almaty Time (UTC+06:00)

| Date | Time | Event |
|---|---|---|
| Thursday, 3 February 2011 | 10:30 | Qualification |
| Thursday, 3 February 2011 | 11:05 | Quarterfinals |
| Thursday, 3 February 2011 | 11:05 | Semifinals |
| Thursday, 3 February 2011 | 11:05 | Finals |

== Results ==
=== Qualification ===
| Rank | Athlete | Score |
|---|---|---|
| 1 | Dmitriy Barmashov (KAZ) | 21.21 |
| 2 | Osamu Ueno (JPN) | 20.66 |
| 3 | Yugo Tsukita (JPN) | 20.57 |
| 4 | Choi Jae-woo (KOR) | 19.81 |
| 5 | Dmitriy Reiherd (KAZ) | 19.16 |
| 6 | Cho Woo-hyun (KOR) | 16.56 |
| 7 | Wang Yusen (CHN) | 13.02 |
| 8 | Ning Suning (CHN) | 12.00 |

=== Knockout round ===
Quarterfinals
1 | Dmitriy Barmashov (KAZ) | 29
8 | Ning Suning (CHN) | 6
5 | Dmitriy Reiherd (KAZ) | 17
4 | Choi Jae-woo (KOR) | 18
3 | Yugo Tsukita (JPN) | 35
6 | Cho Woo-hyun (KOR) | 0
7 | Wang Yusen (CHN) | 7
2 | Osamu Ueno (JPN) | 28

Semifinals
1 | Dmitriy Barmashov (KAZ) | 18
4 | Choi Jae-woo (KOR) | 17
3 | Yugo Tsukita (JPN) | 16
2 | Osamu Ueno (JPN) | 19

Final
1 | Dmitriy Barmashov (KAZ) | 20
2 | Osamu Ueno (JPN) | 15
Small final
4 | Choi Jae-woo (KOR) | 17
3 | Yugo Tsukita (JPN) | 18
