= Kim Ji-hyun =

Kim Ji-hyun may refer to:

- Kim Ji-hyun (singer) (born 1972), singer and actress
- Kim Ji-hyun (badminton) (born 1974), South Korean badminton player
- Kim Ji-hyun (actress) (born 1982), South Korean actress
- Kim Ji-hyeon (footballer) (born 1996), South Korean footballer
- Kim Ji-hyon (born 1995), South Korean freestyle skier
- G.Soul (born 1988), South Korean singer
- Kim Ji-heun (born 1989), South Korean swimmer
