= Freestyle skiing at the 2011 Asian Winter Games – Men's moguls =

Men's moguls at the 2011 Asian Winter Games
- Venue: Tabagan Sport and Recreation Complex
- Dates: 31 January 2011
- Competitors: 10 from 5 nations

Medalists
gold medal	Dmitriy Reiherd	Kazakhstan
silver medal	Osamu Ueno	Japan
bronze medal	Dmitriy Barmashov	Kazakhstan

The men's moguls at the 2011 Asian Winter Games was held on 31 January 2011 at Tabagan Sport and Recreation Complex in Almaty, Kazakhstan.

== Schedule ==
All times are Almaty Time (UTC+06:00)

Date	Time	Event
Monday, 31 January 2011	10:20	Qualification
Monday, 31 January 2011	11:00	Final

== Results ==
Legend

- DNF — Did not finish

=== Qualification ===
Rank	Athlete	Score
1	Dmitriy Reiherd (KAZ)	22.66
2	Osamu Ueno (JPN)	21.18
3	Dmitriy Barmashov (KAZ)	20.46
4	Yugo Tsukita (JPN)	19.89
5	Choi Jae-woo (KOR)	18.99
6	Seo Myung-joon (KOR)	14.57
7	Guo Xiangru (CHN)	12.19
8	Zhao Yang (CHN)	8.23
9	Sumiyaasürengiin Temüülen (MGL)	0.54
—	Chagnaagiin Aranzalzul (MGL)	DNF

=== Final ===
Rank	Athlete	Score
1st place, gold medalist(s)	Dmitriy Reiherd (KAZ)	23.63
2nd place, silver medalist(s)	Osamu Ueno (JPN)	22.47
3rd place, bronze medalist(s)	Dmitriy Barmashov (KAZ)	21.71
4	Choi Jae-woo (KOR)	18.19
5	Seo Myung-joon (KOR)	16.88
6	Zhao Yang (CHN)	12.72
7	Yugo Tsukita (JPN)	12.20
8	Guo Xiangru (CHN)	9.11
