= Matt Graham (skier) =

Australian freestyle skier (born 1994)

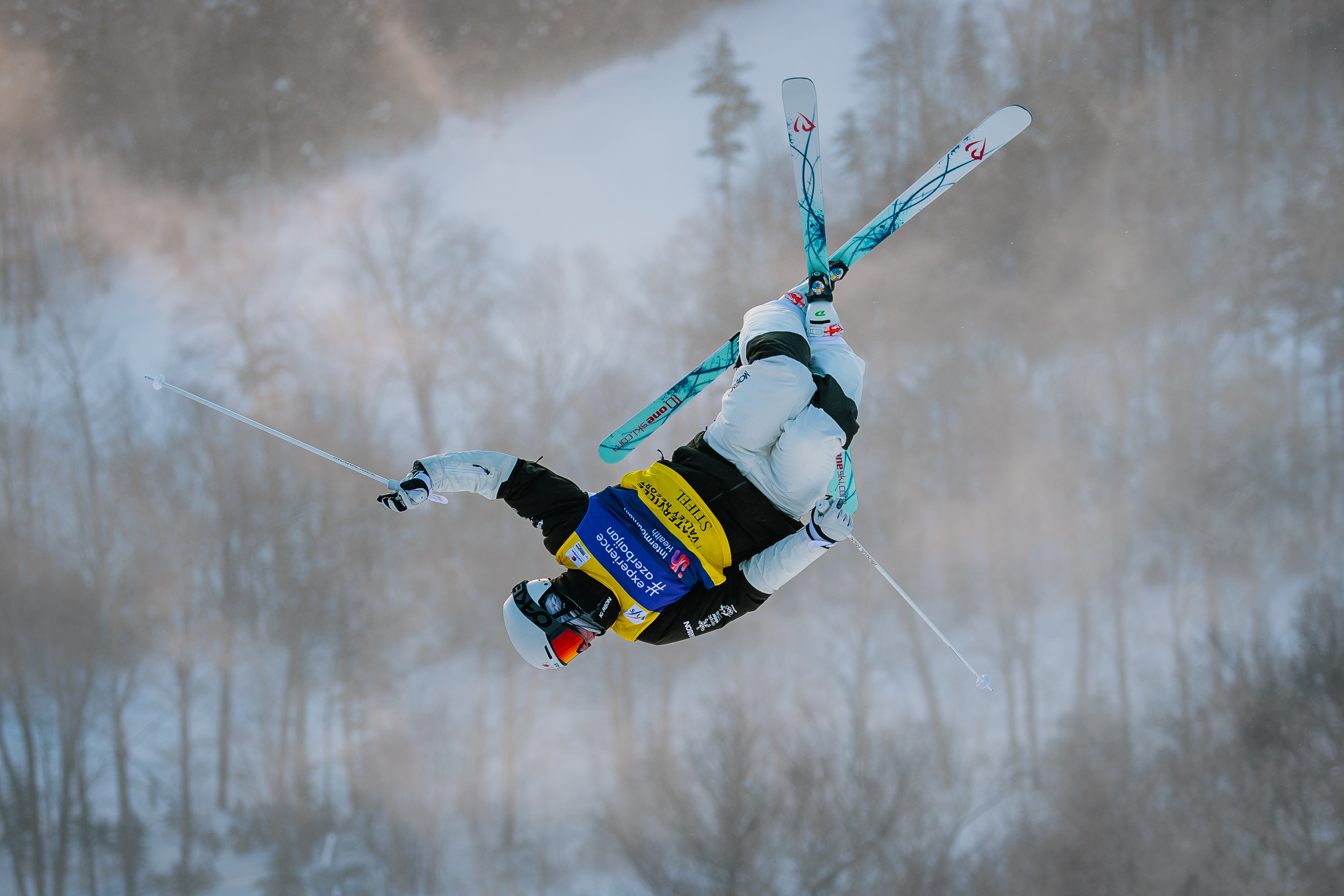
- Graham in 2026

Personal information
- Nationality: Australia
- Born: 23 October 1994 (age 32) Gosford, New South Wales, Australia
- Height: 171 cm (5 ft 7 in)
- Weight: 71 kg (157 lb)

Sport
- Sport: Freestyle skiing
- Events: Moguls, dual moguls
- Club: Perisher Winter Sports Club

World Cup career
- Seasons: 16 (2010–2026)
- Indiv. starts: 121
- Indiv. podiums: 30 (MO – 21, DM – 9)
- Indiv. wins: 6 (MO – 5, DM – 1)
- Discipline titles: 1 — overall moguls (2021)
Medal record
Men's freestyle skiing
Representing Australia
World Cup race podiums
Event	1st	2nd	3rd
Moguls	5	6	10
Dual moguls	1	3	5
Total	6	9	15
International freestyle ski competitions
Event	1st	2nd	3rd
Olympic Games	0	1	1
World Championships	0	3	2
Total	0	4	3
Olympic Games
Silver medal – second place	2018 Pyeongchang	Moguls
Bronze medal – third place	2026 Milano Cortina	Dual moguls
World Championships
Silver medal – second place	2019 Utah	Moguls
Silver medal – second place	2021 Almaty	Dual moguls
Silver medal – second place	2023 Bakuriani	Moguls
Bronze medal – third place	2023 Bakuriani	Dual moguls
Bronze medal – third place	2025 Engadin	Dual moguls
- Updated on 3 March 2026

Matt Graham (born 23 October 1994) is an Australian freestyle skier. He is a four-time Olympian, representing Australia at the 2014 Sochi, 2018 Pyeongchang, 2022 Beijing and 2026 Milano Cortina editions of the games. He is a dual Olympic medalist, earning silver in the 2018 moguls and bronze in the 2026 dual moguls disciplines. He has appeared in seven World Championship, earning three silver medals and two bronze medals. He has also appeared in 16 World Cup seasons, earning the Crystal Globe for overall moguls in the 2020–21 season.

== Career ==
Graham joined the Perisher Winter Sports Club mogul program at the age of six and by 13 he was the youngest athlete in the New South Wales Institute of Sport program. He first made his mark on the world stage as a 15-year-old, placing 27th in his debut in the final World Cup qualification event prior to the Vancouver 2010 Olympic Winter Games.

In 2013, Graham participated in his first World Championships in Voss, Norway. He placed fourth in the final. He also finished seventh at the Sochi Olympic test World Cup event. At the Sochi Olympics in 2014, Graham placed seventh in the finals of the men's moguls.

=== 2020's ===
In a truncated 2020–21 season, Graham made three podiums, including a first place in the dual moguls at Idre Fjäll, and a second place (dual moguls) and third place (moguls) at Deer Valley, Utah in early February. These consistent podiums earned him the Crystal Globe in Overall Moguls for the season.

In the 2022–23 season, Graham put together his most consistent run of results, securing five podium finishes for the season. His first podium of the season was a third place in Ruka, Sweden on 3 December 2022. He won the moguls event and came second in the dual moguls on 2 and 4 February, respectively at Deer Valley, Utah. He then finished third in both the moguls and the dual moguls on the 17th and 18 March 2022 at Almaty, Kazakhstan.

=== 2026 Winter Olympics ===
Having qualified for the 2026 Winter Olympics, Graham was unveiled as part of the 53-athlete strong Australian team in January by chef-de-mission, Alisa Camplin. Graham was then announced as Australia's flag bearer alongside Jakara Anthony for the opening ceremony of the games. He began his Olympic campaign in the men's moguls event. Wearing bib number 2, Graham qualified directly to the final with his first run. In the first final round, he qualified in third for the second final round. Despite being the fastest down the course, Graham posted a total of 80.88 to claim fifth position in the final round. Compatriot, Cooper Woods won the gold medal. Graham also competed in the men's dual moguls event. Graham defeated Taketo Nishizawa, Rasmus Stegfeldt and Charlie Mickel on route to the semifinals where he met Ikuma Horishima. Graham was defeated 14–21 in the semifinals to qualify for the bronze medal run. There he defeated Takuya Shimakawa 20–15 to claim the bronze medal. His medal secured the 'dad podium' alongside Hoishima and Mikaël Kingsbury. It was the fifth medal for the Australian team and the third in moguls.

== Personal life ==
Graham is a graduate of the Central Coast Grammar School, and he has maintained his ties with the school since graduating. He is studying towards his Bachelor of Engineering (Civil) and Bachelor of Business at the University of Newcastle.

== Results ==
=== Olympic Winter Games ===
As of 15 February 2026

Year	Age	Moguls	Dual moguls
(Russia) 2014 Sochi	19	7	N/A
(South Korea) 2018 Pyeongchang	23	2	N/A
(China) 2022 Beijing	27	19	N/A
(Italy) 2026 Milano Cortina	31	5	3

=== World Championships ===
As of 15 February 2026

Year	Age	Moguls	Dual moguls
(Norway) 2013 Voss-Myrkdalen	18	4	38
(Austria) 2015 Kreischberg	20	16	10
(Spain) 2017 Sierra Nevada	22	14	10
(United States) 2019 Deer Valley	24	2	9
(Kazakhstan) 2021 Almaty	26	20	2
(Georgia (country)) 2023 Bakuriani	28	2	3
(Switzerland) 2025 Engadin	30	5	3

=== World Cup ===
==== Results by round ====
As of 12 March 2026

==== Key to colours ====
Winner
Second place
Third place
Other points finish Top15
Other points finish Top30
No points finish
Did not attend (–) or event cancelled (~~C~~)

==== Key to locations ====
- ADH = Alpe d'Huez
- AIR = Airolo
- ALM = Almaty
- BAK = Bakuriani
- BEI = Beidahu
- CAL = Calgary
- DVR = Deer Valley Resort
- GAB = Mont Gabriel
- IDR = Idre Fjäll
- IWR = Inawashiro
- KRA = Krasnoyarsk
- KRB = Kreischberg
- LIV = Livigno
- LKP = Lake Placid
- MEG = Megève
- MRB = Méribel
- MOW = Moscow
- NAN = Nanto
- NBA = Naeba Ski Resort
- PLN = La Plagne
- PPC = Phoenix Pyeongchang
- RUK = Ruka
- SOC = Sochi
- SHA = Shahdag Mountain Resort
- SMU = Suomu
- SNV = Sierra Nevada
- TAZ = Tazawako
- THW = Thaiwoo
- TRM = Mont Tremblant Resort
- VAL = Chiesa in Valmalenco
- VOS = Voss
- VSC = Val Saint-Côme
- WAT = Waterville Valley Resort
- ÅRE = Åre

==== Other notes ====
- Locations in normal font are mogul events.
- Locations in italics are dual mogul events.

Year	Round																			Evnt	Pods	MO	MO	MODM	Ovr
Year	1	2	3	4	5	6	7	8	9	10	11	12	13	14	15	16	17	18	19	Evnt	Pods	MO	MO	MODM	Ovr
2010	SMU –	SMU –	CAL –	CAL –	DVR; 41	DVR; 27	LKP –	ÅRE –	ÅRE –	SNV –										2	–	—N/a	—N/a	60th (4)	–
2012	RUK; 26	MRB –	GAB; 23	LKP; 26	CAL; 20	DVR; 44	DVR; 14	BEI –	NBA –	NBA –	ÅRE –	ÅRE –	MEG –							6	–	—N/a	—N/a	34th (74)	154th (4)
2013	RUK; 27	KRB; 38	LKP; 25	CAL; 19	DVR; 10	DVR; 23	SOC; 10	IWR –	IWR –	ÅRE –	ÅRE –	SNV –								7	–	—N/a	—N/a	28th (92)	133rd (8.00)
2014	RUK; 4	CAL; 13	DVR; 20	DVR; 8	LKP; 22	VSC; 2	IWR –	IWR –	VOS –	VOS –	PLN –									5	–	—N/a	—N/a	22nd (122)	108th (11)
2015	RUK; 22	CAL; 13	DVR; 2	DVR; 6	LKP; 8	VSC; 2	TAZ; 10	TAZ; 3	MEG –											8	3 (0)	—N/a	—N/a	5th (347)	13th (39)
2016	RUK; 8	~~LKP~~; ~~C~~	VSC; 2	CAL; 5	DVR; 1	DVR; 9	TAZ; 3	TAZ; 8	MOW –											7	3 (1)	—N/a	—N/a	2nd (378)	9th (47.25)
2017	RUK; 2	LKP; 15	VSC; 4	CAL; 1	DVR; 4	DVR; 11	PPC; 6	TAZ; 5	TAZ; 3	THW; 3	THW; 9									11	4 (1)	—N/a	—N/a	3rd (554)	7th (50.36)
2018	RUK; 46	THW; 2	THW; 3	CAL; 3	DVR; 13	DVR; 3	TRM; 11	TAZ; 15	TAZ; 17	~~AIR~~; ~~C~~	MEG –									9	4 (0)	—N/a	—N/a	5th (334)	24th (33.40)
2019	RUK; 8	THW; 13	THW; 5	CAL; 4	LKP; 3	TRM; 4	TAZ; 7	TAZ; 4	ALM –											8	1 (0)	—N/a	—N/a	5th (343)	19th (38.11)
2020	RUK; 9	THW; 4	THW; 8	TRM; 5	CAL; 6	DVR; 5	DVR; 5	TAZ; 5	ALM –	KRA –										8	–	—N/a	—N/a	5th (331)	27th (33.10)
2021	RUK; 5	IDR; 11	IDR; 1	DVR; 3	DVR; 2															5	3 (1)	—N/a	—N/a	1st (289)	—N/a
2022	RUK; 10	IDR; 16	IDR –	ADH –	ADH –	TRM –	TRM –	DVR –	DVR –	VAL –	MEG –	MEG –								2	–	30th (41)	—N/a	36th (585)	—N/a
2023	RUK; 3	IDR; 6	IDR; 6	ADH; 7	ADH; 19	VSC; 6	VSC; 4	DVR; 1	DVR; 2	VAL; 17	ALM; 3	ALM; 3								12	5 (1)	2nd (336)	5th (256)	4th (592)	—N/a
2024	RUK; 7	IDR –	IDR –	ADH –	ADH –	BAK –	BAK –	VSC; 9	VSC; 3	WAT; 13	WAT; 46	DVR; 9	DVR; 51	ALM; 3	ALM; 9	VAL –				9	2 (0)	12th (174)	23rd (89)	17th (263)	—N/a
2025	RUK; 10	IDR; 11	~~IDR~~; ~~C~~	~~ADH~~; ~~C~~	~~ADH~~; ~~C~~	BAK; 7	BAK; 6	WAT; 8	WAT; 2	VSC; 9	VSC; 6	DVR; 8	DVR; 6	BEI; 4	BEI; 6	ALM; 7	ALM; 3	LIV; 6	LIV –	15	2 (0)	5th (305)	4th (300)	4th (605)	—N/a
2026	RUK; 4	RUK; 1	VSC; 2	VSC; 5	WAT; 16	NAN; 1	NAN; 4	~~ALM~~; ~~C~~	~~ALM~~; ~~C~~	~~SHA~~; ~~C~~	~~SHA~~; ~~C~~									7	3 (2)	2nd (345)	8th (63)	2nd (408)	—N/a
Total																				121	30 (6)	(silver) x2	4th x1	(gold) x1	7th x1

==== World Cup podiums ====
As of 3 March 2026

	1st	2nd	3rd	Total
Moguls	5	6	10	21
Dual moguls	1	3	5	9
Total	6	9	15	30

No.	Season	Date	Location	Discipline	Place
1	2014–15	9 January 2015	(United States) Deer Valley	Moguls	Second
2	2014–15	7 February 2015	(Canada) Val Saint-Côme	Moguls	Second
3	2014–15	1 March 2015	(Japan) Tazawako	Dual moguls	Third
4	2015–16	23 January 2016	(Canada) Val Saint-Côme	Moguls	Second
5	2015–16	4 February 2016	(United States) Deer Valley	Moguls	Winner
6	2015–16	27 February 2016	(Japan) Tazawako	Moguls	Third
7	2016–17	10 December 2016	(Finland) Ruka	Moguls	Second
8	2016–17	28 January 2017	(Canada) Calgary	Moguls	Winner
9	2016–17	19 February 2017	(Japan) Tazawako	Dual moguls	Third
10	2016–17	25 February 2017	(China) Thaiwoo	Moguls	Third
11	2017–18	21 December 2017	(China) Thaiwoo	Moguls	Second
12	2017–18	22 December 2017	(China) Thaiwoo	Moguls	Third
13	2017–18	6 January 2018	(Canada) Calgary	Moguls	Third
14	2017–18	11 January 2018	(United States) Deer Valley	Moguls	Third
15	2018–19	18 January 2019	(United States) Lake Placid	Moguls	Third
16	2020–21	13 December 2020	(Sweden) Idre Fjäll	Dual moguls	Winner
17	2020–21	4 February 2021	(United States) Deer Valley	Moguls	Third
18	2020–21	5 February 2021	(United States) Deer Valley	Dual moguls	Second
19	2022–23	3 December 2022	(Finland) Ruka	Moguls	Third
20	2022–23	2 February 2023	(United States) Deer Valley	Moguls	Winner
21	2022–23	4 February 2023	(United States) Deer Valley	Dual moguls	Second
22	2022–23	17 March 2023	(Kazakhstan) Almaty	Moguls	Third
23	2022–23	18 March 2023	(Kazakhstan) Almaty	Dual moguls	Third
24	2023–24	20 January 2024	(Canada) Val Saint-Côme	Dual moguls	Third
25	2023–24	8 March 2024	(Kazakhstan) Almaty	Moguls	Third
26	2024–25	25 January 2025	(United States) Waterville Valley	Dual moguls	Second
27	2024–25	1 March 2025	(Kazakhstan) Almaty	Dual moguls	Third
28	2025–26	8 December 2025	(Finland) Ruka	Moguls	Winner
29	2025–26	9 January 2026	(Canada) Val Saint-Côme	Moguls	Second
30	2025–26	28 February 2026	(Japan) Nanto	Moguls	Winner

Winter Olympics
Preceded by Brendan Kerry and Laura Peel	Flag bearer for Australia (opening ceremony); 2026 Milano Cortina alongside Jakara Anthony	Succeeded by incumbent
