= Freestyle skiing at the 2015 Winter Universiade – Men's moguls =

The men's moguls competition of the 2015 Winter Universiade was held at Visera slope, Sierra Nevada, Spain on February 5, 2015.

The qualification round were cancelled due to bad weather conditions.

== Results ==
| Rank | Bib | Name | Country | Score | Notes |
|---|---|---|---|---|---|
| 1st place, gold medalist(s) | 2 | Pavel Kolmakov | Kazakhstan | 72.45 | |
| 2nd place, silver medalist(s) | 1 | Dmitriy Reiherd | Kazakhstan | 68.73 | |
| 3rd place, bronze medalist(s) | 4 | Sergei Shimbuev | Russia | 62.11 | |
| 4 | 7 | Kim Ji-hyon | South Korea | 58.55 | |
| 5 | 3 | Egor Anufriev | Russia | 57.48 | |
| 6 | 8 | Jules Escobar | France | 52.98 | |
| 7 | 6 | Maksim Mikhaylov | Russia | 52.41 | |
| 8 | 17 | Luke Farny | United States | 48.97 | |
| 9 | 11 | Sascha Posch | Austria | 46.99 | |
| 10 | 10 | Daniel Honzig | Czech Republic | 44.47 | |
| 11 | 19 | Andrey Loginov | Kazakhstan | 44.41 | |
| 12 | 5 | Nikita Kapitonov | Russia | 39.82 | |
| 13 | 22 | Ander Zamora | Spain | 39.17 | |
| 14 | 21 | Ruggero Rosi | Italy | 38.58 | |
| 15 | 9 | Seo Myung-joon | South Korea | 37.38 | |
| 16 | 14 | Zhao Yang | China | 36.72 | |
| 17 | 15 | Song Xiaochen | China | 35.14 | |
| 18 | 12 | Thomas Aigner | Austria | 27.36 | |
| 19 | 18 | Konstantin Gorlachev | Kazakhstan | 20.66 | |
| 20 | 20 | Jorge Montoya | Spain | 17.96 | |
| 21 | 16 | Michael DeGrandis | United States | 10.33 | |
| 22 | 13 | Chen Kang | China | 7.66 | |
| 23 | 30 | Dorijan Mavrinac | Croatia | 2.68 | |
