= Freestyle skiing at the 2019 Winter Universiade =

Freestyle skiing at the XXIX Winter Universiade
- Dates: 3–11 March 2019

Freestyle skiing at the 2019 Winter Universiade was held at the Sopka Cluster of the Winter Sports Academy in Krasnoyarsk from 3 to 11 March 2019.

== Men's events ==
Event	Gold		Silver		Bronze	
Aerials	(Russia) Maxim Burov	119.91	(China) Li Zhonglin	87.77	(Russia) Ruslan Katmanov	87.77
Slopestyle	(Germany) Tobias Müller	92.00	(France) Eliot Gorry	89.20	(Switzerland) Jona Schmidhalter	89.20
Moguls	(France) Benjamin Cavet	80.36	(Japan) Daichi Hara	80.22	(Japan) Ikuma Horishima	79.04
Dual Moguls	(Japan) Ikuma Horishima		(Kazakhstan) Pavel Kolmakov		(France) Benjamin Cavet	
Ski cross	(Russia) Artem Nabiulin		(Russia) Maxim Vikhrov		(Germany) Florian Wilmsmann	

== Women's events ==
Event	Gold		Silver		Bronze	
Aerials	(Belarus) Aliaksandra Ramanouskaya	100.29	(Russia) Liubov Nikitina	91.29	(Kazakhstan) Zhanbota Aldabergenova	79.38
Slopestyle	(Russia) Lana Prusakova	87.00	(Russia) Anastasia Tatalina	84.60	(France) Lou Barin	74.80
Moguls	(Japan) Kisara Sumiyoshi	65.86	(Germany) Léa Bouard	65.65	(Germany) Sophie Weese	60.43
Dual Moguls	(Germany) Léa Bouard		(Japan) Kisara Sumiyoshi		(Russia) Elizaveta Bezgodova	
Ski cross	(Russia) Ekaterina Maltseva		(Russia) Anna Antonova		(Czech Republic) Klára Kašparová	

== Mixed Team ==
Event	Gold		Silver		Bronze	
Team aerials	Belarus; Aliaksandra Ramanouskaya; Artsiom Bashlakou	182.42	Russia 2 Kristina Spiridonova; Stanislav Nikitin	181.27	Russia 1 Liubov Nikitina; Maxim Burov	170.04

== Medal table ==
* Host nation (Russia)

Rank	Nation	Gold	Silver	Bronze	Total
1	Russia*	4	5	3	12
2	Japan	2	2	1	5
3	Germany	2	1	2	5
4	Belarus	2	0	0	2
5	France	1	1	2	4
6	Kazakhstan	0	1	1	2
7	China	0	1	0	1
8	Czech Republic	0	0	1	1
8	Switzerland	0	0	1	1
Totals (9 entries)		11	11	11	33
