= Nikita Andreev (freestyle skier) =

Russian freestyle skier

Personal information
- Nationality: Russia
- Born: 12 September 2004 (age 21) Saint Petersburg, Russia

Sport
- Sport: Freestyle skiing
- Event: Moguls
Medal record
Men's freestyle skiing
Representing Russia
Junior World Championships
Gold medal – first place	2021 Krasnoyarsk	Moguls

Nikita Andreev (born 12 September 2004) is a Russian freestyle skier. He competed in the 2022 Winter Olympics.

== Career ==
Andreev won a gold medal at the 2021 Junior World Championships in the moguls event. He finished 27th out of 30 competitors in the first qualifying round in the men's moguls event at the 2022 Winter Olympics. After finishing in the top ten of the second qualifying round and the top 12 of the first final round, he failed to complete his run in the second final round, eliminating him from medal contention and the competition.
