= Nikita Novitskii =

Russian freestyle skier

Personal information
- Nationality: Russia
- Born: 24 August 2000 (age 25) Ust-Ilimsk, Russia

Sport
- Sport: Freestyle skiing
- Event: Moguls
Medal record
Men's freestyle skiing
Representing Russia
Junior World Championships
Gold medal – first place	2019 Chiesa in Valmalenco	Moguls

Nikita Leonidovich Novitskii (Russian: Никита Леонидович Новицкий; born 24 August 2000) is a Russian freestyle skier. He competed in the 2022 Winter Olympics.

== Career ==
Novitskii won a gold medal at the 2019 Junior World Championships in the moguls event. He placed fourth in moguls in the 2021 World Championships. He finished 13th out of 30 competitors in the first qualifying round in the men's moguls event at the 2022 Winter Olympics. He then finished 13th out of 20 competitors in the first final round, eliminating him from medal contention.
