= Olli Penttala =

Finnish freestyle skier (born 1995)

Personal information
- Nationality: Finland
- Born: 10 April 1995 (age 31) Helsinki, Finland

Sport
- Sport: Freestyle skiing
- Event: Moguls
- Club: Freestyleseura Moebius
Medal record
Men's freestyle skiing
Representing Finland
Junior World Championships
Bronze medal – third place	2011 Jyväskylä	Moguls

Olli Penttala (born 10 April 1995) is a Finnish freestyle skier. He competed in the 2022 and 2026 Winter Olympics.

== Career ==
Penttala began skiing at the age of seven. He won a bronze medal at the 2011 Junior World Championships in the moguls event. He placed eighth in moguls in the 2021 World Championships. He finished 9th out of 30 competitors in the first qualifying round in the men's moguls event at the 2022 Winter Olympics. He then finished 19th out of 20 competitors in the first final round, eliminating him from medal contention.

== Personal life ==
Penttala's older brother Jussi is also a freestyle skier and competed at the 2014 and 2018 Winter Olympics.
