= Osamu Ueno =

Japanese freestyle skier (born 1983)

Personal information
- Nationality: Japanese
- Born: 22 June 1983 (age 42) Nozawaonsen, Japan

Sport
- Sport: Freestyle skiing

Osamu Ueno (上野 修, Ueno Osamu; born 22 June 1983) is a Japanese freestyle skier. He competed in the men's moguls event at the 2006 Winter Olympics.
