= Troy Murphy (skier) =

American freestyle skier

Personal information
- Full name: Troy Jaqe Murphy
- Born: June 13, 1992 (age 34) Bethel, Maine, U.S.
- Height: 1.80 m (5 ft 11 in)

Sport
- Sport: Freestyle skiing

Troy Murphy (born June 13, 1992) is an American freestyle skier. He came in 17th in the Men's Moguls competition in the 2018 Winter Olympics. He's since achieved notoriety on social media for portraying a character named Donny Pelletier, an out-of-control hot dogger with a wicked Maine accent and a penchant for swilling Moxie.
