= Marco Tadé =

Swiss freestyle skier

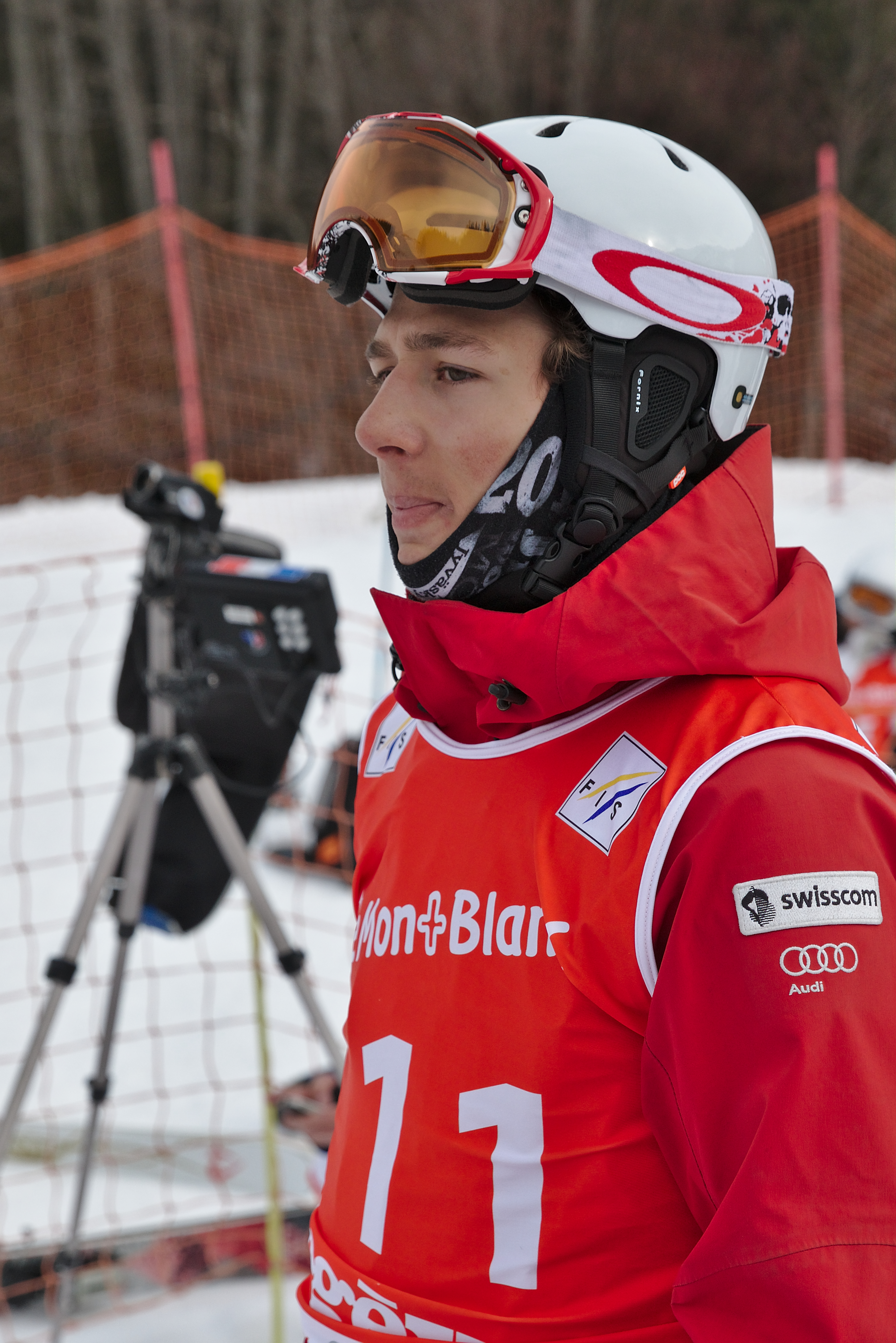
- Marco Tadé at FIS Moguls World Cup in 2015

Personal information
- Nationality: Switzerland
- Born: 3 December 1995 (age 30) Locarno, Switzerland

Sport
- Sport: Freestyle skiing
- Event: Moguls
- Club: Sci Club Airolo
Medal record
Men's freestyle skiing
Representing Switzerland
World Championships
Bronze medal – third place	2017 Sierra Nevada	Dual moguls
Junior World Championships
Bronze medal – third place	2014 Chiesa in Valmalenco	Dual moguls

Marco Tadé (born 3 December 1995) is a Swiss freestyle skier. He competed in the 2022 Winter Olympics.

== Career ==
Tadé began skiing in 2000. He won a bronze medal at the 2014 Junior World Championships in the dual moguls event. He also won a bronze medal in dual moguls at the 2017 World Championships. His career high World Cup placement is second, which he achieved in moguls in Ruka in the 2020–21 season and in dual moguls in Thaiwoo in the 2016–17 season. He was selected to represent Switzerland at the 2018 Winter Olympics but was forced to withdraw due to injury.

He failed to qualify in the first qualifying round but was the final qualifier into the finals of the men's moguls event at the 2022 Winter Olympics. He then finished 18th out of 20 competitors in the first final round, eliminating him from medal contention.
