= Philippe Marquis =

Canadian freestyle skier (born 1989)

Philippe Marquis OLY
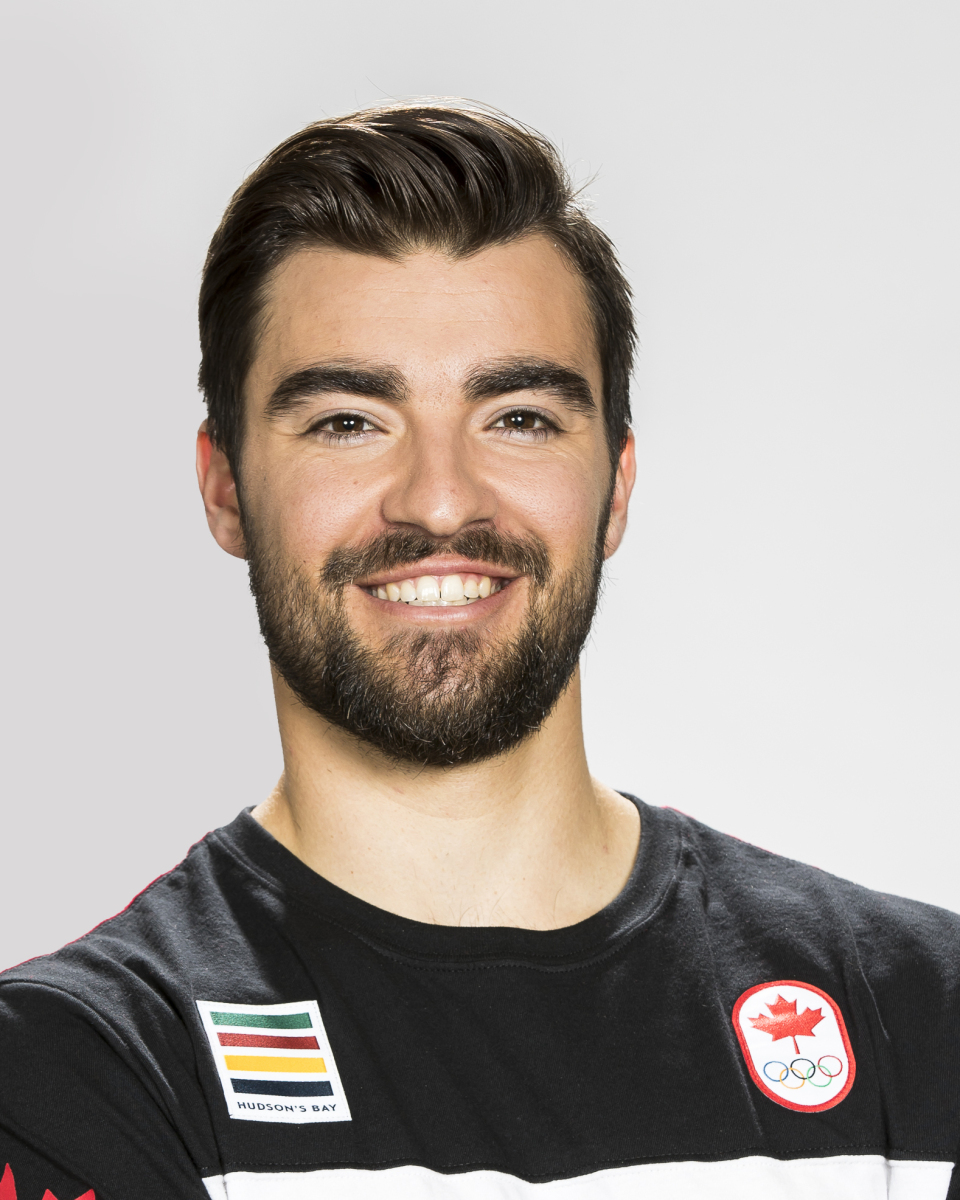

Personal information
- Born: May 9, 1989 (age 37) Quebec City, Quebec, Canada
- Height: 1.68 m (5 ft 6 in)
- Weight: 68 kg (150 lb)
- Website: philippemarquis.com
Medal record
Men's Freestyle skiing
Representing Canada
World Championships
Silver medal – second place	2015 Kreischberg	Dual moguls

Philippe Marquis (born May 9, 1989) is a Canadian freestyle skier. He is the brother of mogulist Vincent Marquis. Marquis represented Canada at the 2014 Winter Olympics in the men's moguls event.
