= Will Feneley =

British freestyle skier

Personal information
- Full name: William Feneley
- Nationality: United Kingdom
- Born: 13 July 1999 (age 25); Norwich, United Kingdom

Sport
- Sport: Freestyle skiing
- Event: Moguls
- Club: GB Snowsport

William Feneley (born 13 July 1999) is a British freestyle skier. He competed in the 2022 Winter Olympics.

== Career ==
Feneley began skiing at the age of six. He became the youngest mogul skier to represent Great Britain after competing in the Junior World Championships in 2014. After some success on the competitive circuit, he was invited to join the British national squad in 2017. He finished 23rd out of 30 competitors in the first qualifying round in the men's moguls event at the 2022 Winter Olympics. He then finished 17th out of 20 competitors in the second qualifying round, preventing him from reaching the finals.

== Personal life ==
Feneley's brother Luke is also a freestyle skier. Feneley competes in artistic gymnastics, placing third in tumbling at a British national championship event.
