= Daichi Hara =

Japanese freestyle skier (born 1997)

Personal information
- Nationality: Japanese
- Born: 4 March 1997 (age 29) Shibuya, Tokyo, Japan
- Height: 1.72 m (5 ft 8 in)
- Weight: 75 kg (165 lb)

Sport
- Country: Japan
- Sport: Freestyle skiing
- Event: Moguls
- Club: Nihon
Medal record
Men's freestyle skiing
Representing Japan
Olympic Games
Bronze medal – third place	2018 Pyeongchang	Moguls
World Championships
Bronze medal – third place	2019 Utah	Moguls
Bronze medal – third place	2019 Utah	Dual moguls
Winter Universiade
Silver medal – second place	2019 Krasnoyarsk	Moguls

Daichi Hara (Japanese: 原 大智, Hepburn: Hara Daichi; born 4 March 1997) is a Japanese freestyle skier and professional racing cyclist (競輪, Keirin).

He competed in the 2018 Winter Olympics and won the bronze medal.

He became a professional racing cyclist (Keirin) on March 25, 2020. However, he has not retired from Freestyle skiing and competed in the 2022 Winter Olympics.
