= Dmitriy Barmashov =

Kazakhstani freestyle skier (born 1985)

Personal information
- Born: 25 September 1985 (age 41) Oskemen, Kazakh SSR, Soviet Union

Sport
- Sport: Skiing
Medal record
Men's freestyle skiing
Representing Kazakhstan
Asian Games
Gold medal – first place	2011 Astana-Almaty	Dual moguls
Bronze medal – third place	2011 Astana-Almaty	Moguls
- Updated on 15 March 2013

Dmitriy Vladimirovich Barmashov (Russian: Дмитрий Владимирович Бармашов; born 25 September 1985 in Oskemen) is a Kazakhstani freestyle skier, specializing in moguls.

Barmashov competed at the 2010 Winter Olympics for Kazakhstan. He did not advance to the moguls final, placing 29th in the qualifying round.

As of March 2013, his best showing at the World Championships is 17th, in the 2005 dual moguls event.

Barmashov made his World Cup debut in December 2005. As of March 2013, his best finish is 8th, in a dual moguls event at Deer Valley in 2011/12. His best World Cup overall finish is 29th, in 2008/09 and 2011/12.
