= Oskar Elofsson =

Swedish freestyle skier (born 1998)

Personal information
- Nationality: Sweden
- Born: 24 September 1998 (age 26)

Sport
- Sport: Freestyle skiing
- Event: Moguls
- Club: Landskrona Ski Club

Oskar Elofsson (born 24 September 1998) is a Swedish freestyle skier. He competed in the 2022 Winter Olympics.

== Career ==
Elofsson began moguls skiing at the age of 11. He reached his first career podium on the World Cup tour in 2018, finishing second in dual moguls in Thaiwoo. He finished 26th out of 30 competitors in the first qualifying round in the men's moguls event at the 2022 Winter Olympics. He then finished 12th out of 20 competitors in the second qualifying round, eliminating him from the competition.

== Personal life ==
Elofsson's older brother Felix is also a freestyle skier and competed at the 2018 and 2022 Winter Olympics.
