= Kosuke Sugimoto =

Japanese freestyle skier (born 1994)

Personal information
- Nationality: Japanese
- Born: 2 December 1994 (age 30); Shizuoka, Japan

Sport
- Sport: Freestyle skiing
- Event: Moguls
- Club: Dayly Hayashiya

Kosuke Sugimoto (Japanese: 杉本幸祐, born 2 December 1994) is a Japanese freestyle skier. He competed in the 2022 Winter Olympics.

Sugimoto earned two national championships silver medals in 2020 (moguls, dual moguls). In 39 World Cup starts, he earned his first podium finish on 13 January 2022 in Deer Valley (third). He currently resides in Nagano.
