= Laurent Dumais =

Canadian freestyle skier

Personal information
- Born: 25 March 1996 (age 30) Quebec City, Quebec, Canada
- Height: 177 cm (5 ft 10 in)

Sport
- Country: Canada
- Sport: Freestyle skiing
- Event: Moguls

Laurent Dumais (born 25 March 1996) is a Canadian freestyle skier who competes internationally in the moguls discipline.

== Career ==
Dumais has been part of the national team since 2014. At the 2021 World Championships in Almaty, Kazakhstan, Dumais finished 6th in the moguls event.

In the summer of 2021, Dumais suffered a herniated disc, causing him to miss the start of the 2021–22 season. However, on January 24, 2022, Dumais was named to Canada's 2022 Olympic team.
