= Benjamin Cavet =

French freestyle skier (born 1994)

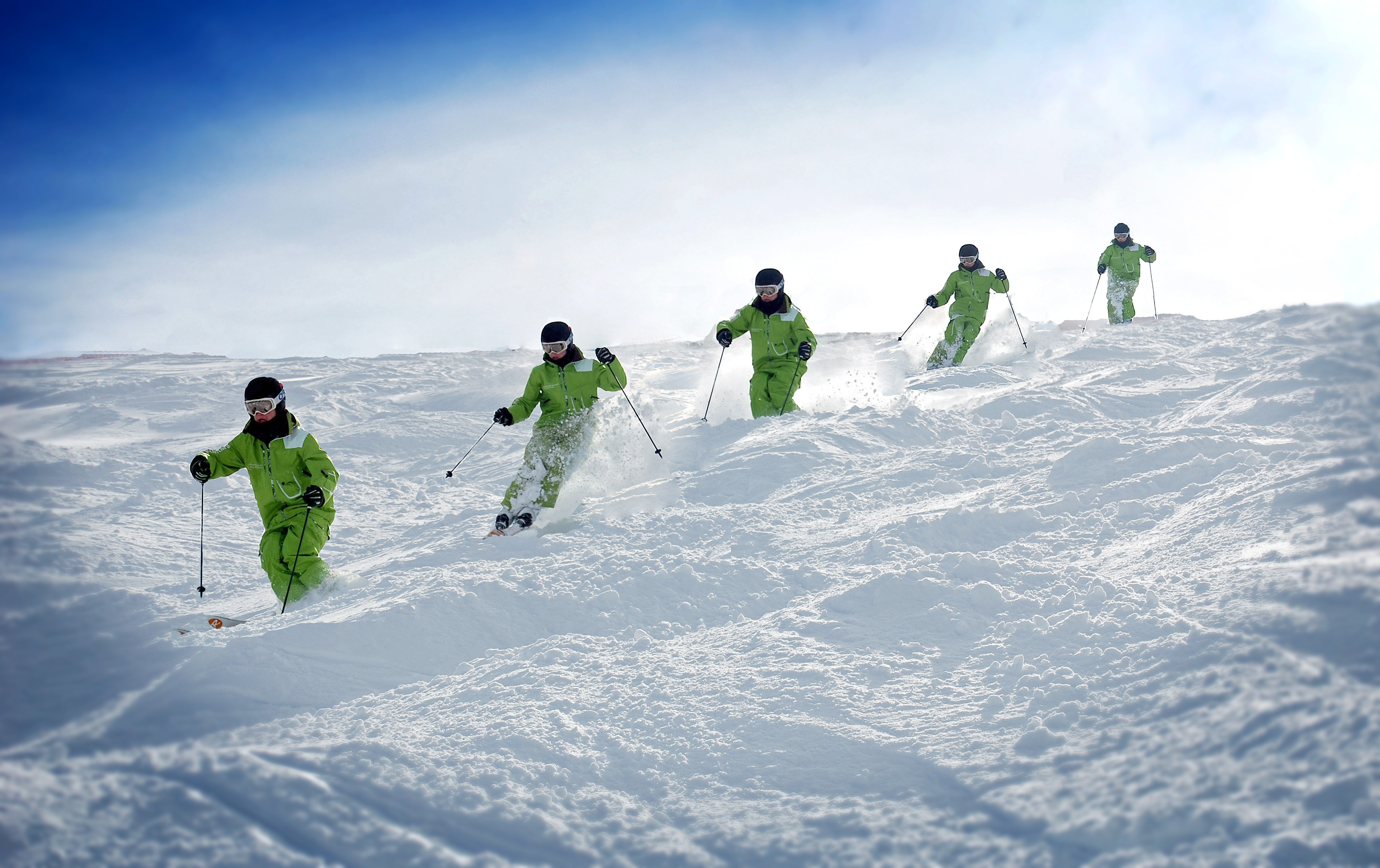
- Cavet skiing the moguls

Personal information
- Nationality: French
- Born: 1 January 1994 (age 32) Maidstone, England
- Height: 1.80 m (5 ft 11 in)
- Weight: 70 kg (154 lb)

Sport
- Country: France
- Sport: Freestyle skiing
- Event: Moguls
- Club: Chatel
Medal record
Representing France
World Championships
Silver medal – second place	2017 Sierra Nevada	Moguls
Silver medal – second place	2021 Almaty	Moguls
Winter Universiade
Gold medal – first place	2019 Krasnoyarsk	Moguls
Bronze medal – third place	2019 Krasnoyarsk	Dual moguls
Junior World Championships
Gold medal – first place	2014 Chiesa in Valmalenco	Dual Moguls
Silver medal – second place	2014 Chiesa in Valmalenco	Moguls
Representing United Kingdom
Junior World Championships
Silver medal – second place	2011 Jyväskylä	Moguls

Benjamin Cavet (born 1 January 1994) is a freestyle skier specializing in mogul skiing. He represented France at the 2014, 2018, 2022, and 2026 Winter Olympics.

== Biography ==
At age 10, he moved to France with his parents and joined the Chatel ski club. He became a French citizen in 2012, after not having been offered funding from the UK. He competed for France in the moguls at the Winter Olympics 2014.

In 2014, he placed eighth in the Sochi Winter Olympics, had his first podium in World Cup in La Plagne, France, and became Junior World Champion in dual moguls.

In 2016, Cavet was on the podium three times and finished third overall in the FIS World Cup series. The season 2016–17 was the most successful yet for Cavet; he was on the podium six times in World Cup Moguls and finished 2nd overall. At the World Championships in Sierra Nevada, Spain, he was crowned vice-world champion.
