= Brodie Summers =

Australian freestyle skier (born 1993)

Personal information
- Born: 18 October 1993 (age 32) Perth, Western Australia
- Education: St Michael's Grammar School, St Kilda, Victoria

Sport
- Country: Australia
- Sport: Moguls
Medal record
Representing Australia

Brodie Summers (born 18 October 1993) is an Australian freestyle skier. He competed at the FIS Freestyle World Ski Championships 2013 in Myrkdalen-Voss, and at the 2014 Winter Olympics in Sochi, finishing 13th in the men's moguls event. At the 2018 Winter Olympics he was injured during the practice runs and was unable to compete. He attended his third Winter Olympics in Beijing in 2022, finishing 10th in the men's moguls.
