= Sacha Theocharis =

French freestyle skier (born 1990)

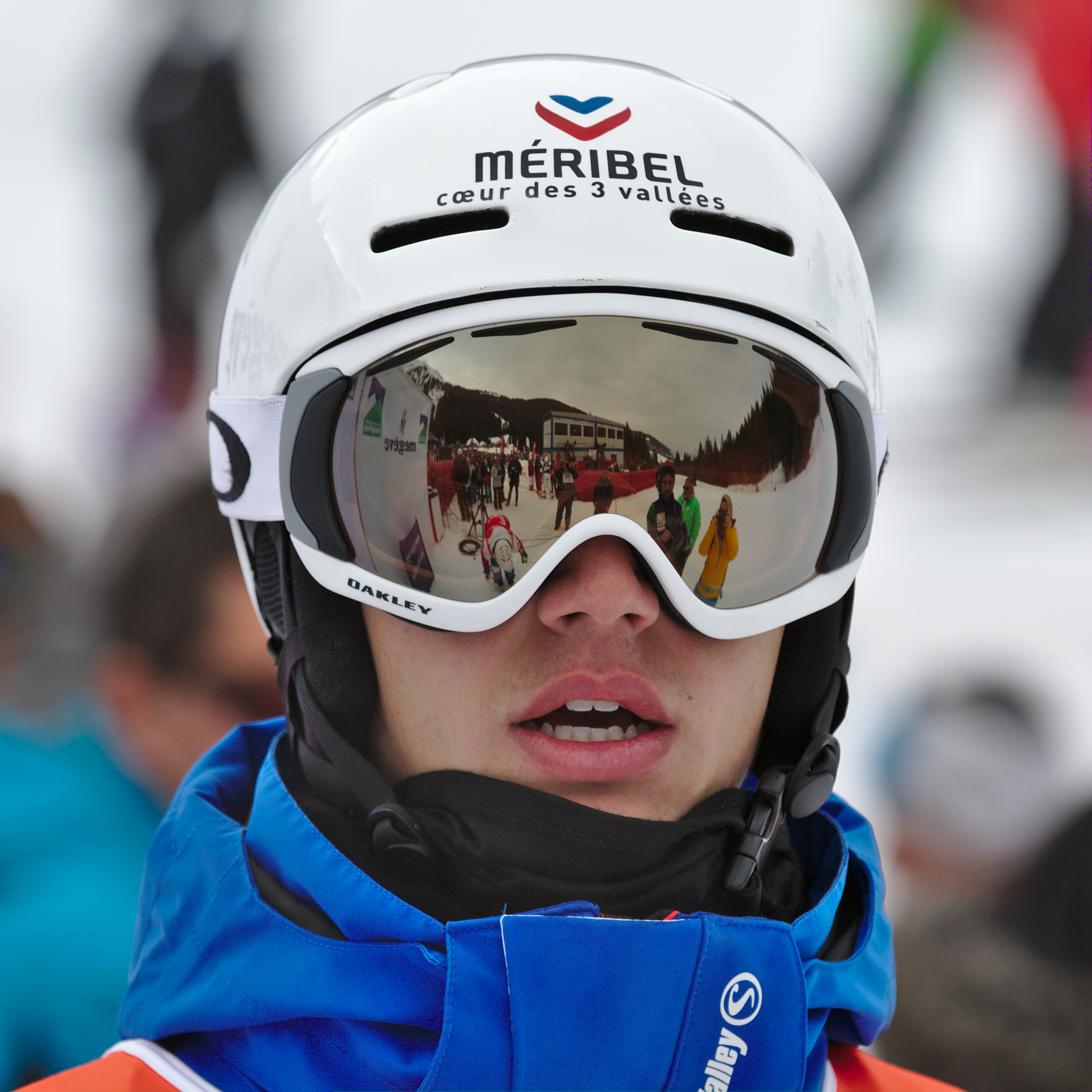
- Theocharis in 2015

Personal information
- Nationality: French
- Born: 19 November 1990 (age 35) Bron, France
- Height: 1.76 m (5 ft 9 in)

Sport
- Sport: Freestyle skiing

Sacha Theocharis (born 19 November 1990) is a French freestyle skier. He competed in the 2018 Winter Olympics.
