= Dylan Walczyk =

American freestyle skier (born 1993)

Personal information
- Born: June 25, 1993 (age 32) Rochester, New York, U.S.

Sport
- Sport: Freestyle skiing
- Event: Moguls

Dylan Walczyk (born June 25, 1993, in Rochester, New York) is an American Olympic freestyle skier who represented the United States in the men's moguls event at the 2022 and 2026 Winter Olympics. On February 3, 2022, in one of the games first rounds of competition Walczyk placed 10th in the initial qualifying round and made it through to the event's February 5th final where he placed 16th.

Dylan's career includes over 120 World Cup appearances, 10 World Ski Championships starts, and two podium finishes. Dylan holds the title of being the only athlete to win the FIS NorAm Tour three times. Dylan has accumulated Over 50 World Cup Top 10 finishes an over 12 Top 5 finishes.
