= Kim Ji-hyon =

South Korean freestyle skier (born 1995)

Personal information
- Nationality: South Korean
- Born: 11 January 1995 (age 31) Seoul, South Korea
- Height: 1.80 m (5 ft 11 in)

Sport
- Country: South Korea
- Sport: Freestyle skiing

Korean name
- Hangul: 김지현
- RR: Gim Jihyeon
- MR: Kim Chihyŏn

Kim Ji-hyon (born 11 January 1995) is a South Korean freestyle skier. He competed in the 2018 Winter Olympics.
