= Felix Elofsson =

Swedish freestyle skier (born 1995)

Personal information
- Nationality: Swedish
- Born: 30 September 1995 (age 30) Limhamn, Sweden
- Height: 1.84 m (6 ft 0 in)

Sport
- Sport: Freestyle skiing

Felix Elofsson (born 30 September 1995) is a Swedish freestyle skier. He competed in the 2018 Winter Olympics.
