= Ikuma Horishima =

Japanese freestyle skier (born 1997)

Personal information
- Nationality: Japanese
- Born: 11 December 1997 (age 28) Ikeda, Japan
- Height: 1.70 m (5 ft 7 in)
- Weight: 66 kg (146 lb)

Sport
- Country: Japan
- Sport: Freestyle skiing
- Event: Moguls
- Club: Toyota Motor Corp
Medal record
Men's freestyle skiing
Representing Japan
Olympic Games
Silver medal – second place	2026 Milano Cortina	Dual moguls
Bronze medal – third place	2022 Beijing	Moguls
Bronze medal – third place	2026 Milano Cortina	Moguls
World Championships
Gold medal – first place	2017 Sierra Nevada	Moguls
Gold medal – first place	2017 Sierra Nevada	Dual moguls
Gold medal – first place	2025 Engadin	Moguls
Silver medal – second place	2025 Engadin	Dual moguls
Bronze medal – third place	2021 Almaty	Dual moguls
Winter Universiade
Gold medal – first place	2019 Krasnoyarsk	Dual moguls
Bronze medal – third place	2019 Krasnoyarsk	Moguls

Ikuma Horishima (堀島 行真, Horishima Ikuma; born 11 December 1997) is a Japanese freestyle skier who competes internationally. He competed for Japan at the FIS Freestyle Ski and Snowboarding World Championships 2017 in Sierra Nevada, Spain, where he won a gold medal in Moguls, and another gold medal in Dual moguls.

Horishima won the bronze medal in the Beijing 2022 Winter Olympics men's moguls with a score of 81.48. He repeated the feat at the 2026 Winter Olympics, again winning the bronze medal in the men's moguls.
