= Ludvig Fjällström =

Swedish freestyle skier (born 1993)

Personal information
- Born: 15 April 1993 (age 33) Åre, Sweden

Sport
- Sport: Skiing

Ludvig Fjällström (born 15 April 1993 in Åre) is a Swedish freestyle skier, specializing in moguls.

Fjällström competed at the 2014 Winter Olympics for Sweden. He placed 16th in the first qualifying round in the moguls, not advancing. He then finished 7th in the second qualifying round, moving on to the final. In the first run of the final, he placed 19th, failing to advance.

His best showing at the World Championships is 12th, in the 2013 dual moguls.

Fjällström made his World Cup debut in March 2010. As of February 2018, his best World Cup finish is 3rd, in a moguls event in Deer Valley in 2015–16. His best World Cup overall finish in moguls is 11th, in 2015–16.
