= Bradley Wilson (freestyle skier) =

American freestyle skier (born 1992)

Brad Wilson
Personal information
- Full name: Bradley Wilson
- Born: June 5, 1992 (age 34) Butte, Montana, U.S.
- Height: 5 ft 10 in (178 cm)
- Weight: 165 lb (75 kg)

Sport
- Country: United States
- Sport: Freestyle skiing
- Event: Dual moguls
- Club: Wasatch Freestyle Foundation
Medal record
World Championships
Silver medal – second place	2019 Utah	Dual moguls

Bradley Wilson (born June 5, 1992) is a former American freestyle skier. He is the younger brother of Olympic bronze medalist Bryon Wilson. They would build and then ski on their own moguls courses in their hometown of Butte, Montana.

Wilson competed at the 2014 Winter Olympics in Sochi, Russia.

He competed at the 2018 Winter Olympics and the 2022 Winter Olympics. On March 19, 2022, Wilson announced his retirement.
