= James Matheson (skier) =

Australian freestyle skier

Personal information
- Nationality: Australian
- Born: 10 April 1995 (age 30) Buenos Aires, Argentina
- Height: 1.75 m (5 ft 9 in)

Sport
- Sport: Freestyle skiing

James Matheson (born 10 April 1995) is an Australian freestyle skier. He competed in the 2018 Winter Olympics.
