= Dmitriy Reiherd =

Kazakh freestyle skier

Dmitry Reiherd
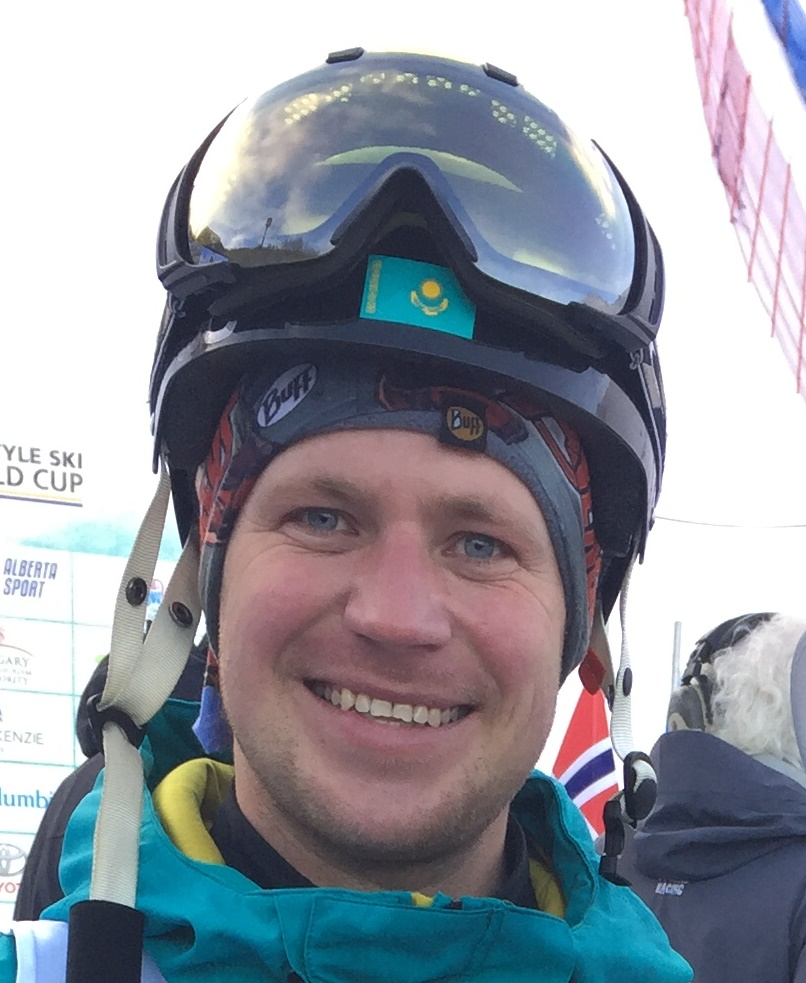

Personal information
- Born: 8 January 1989 (age 37) Oskemen, Kazakh SSR, Soviet Union

Sport
- Sport: Skiing

World Cup career
- Indiv. podiums: 12
- Indiv. wins: 2
Medal record
Men's freestyle skiing
Representing Kazakhstan
Winter Universiade
Gold medal – first place	2017 Almaty	Moguls
Gold medal – first place	2017 Almaty	Dual moguls
Silver medal – second place	2015 Granada	Moguls
Asian Games
Gold medal – first place	2011 Astana-Almaty	Moguls
Bronze medal – third place	2017 Sapporo	Moguls
- Updated on 2 March 2013

Dmitry Reiherd (born 8 January 1989 in Oskemen) is a Kazakh freestyle skier, specializing in moguls.

Reiherd competed at the 2006 and 2010 Winter Olympics for Kazakhstan. His best performance came in 2010, when he qualified for the moguls final, finishing 18th. In 2006, he finished 33rd in the qualifying round, and did not advance.

As of February 2013, his best showing at the World Championships came in 2009, placing 15th in the moguls event.

Reiherd made his World Cup debut in February 2005. As of February 2013, he has won one World Cup event, a Dual Moguls competition at Åre in 2007/08. This result included defeating 2006 Olympic moguls champion Dale Begg-Smith in the final. Altogether, he has four World Cup medals, his first medal also coming at Åre, a day before his first victory. His best World Cup finish is 10th, in 2007/08.

== World Cup podiums ==
Date	Location	Rank	Event
7 March 2008	Åre	3rd place, bronze medalist(s)	Moguls
8 March 2008	Åre	1st place, gold medalist(s)	Dual moguls
14 January 2010	Deer Valley	3rd place, bronze medalist(s)	Moguls
12 February 2012	Beida Lake	2nd place, silver medalist(s)	Moguls
6 February 2016	Deer Valley	3rd place, bronze medalist(s)	Dual Moguls
13 January 2017	Lake Placid	1st place, gold medalist(s)	Moguls
11 February 2017	Pyeongchang	2nd place, silver medalist(s)	Moguls
9 December 2017	Ruka	2nd place, silver medalist(s)	Moguls
22 December 2017	Thaiwoo	2nd place, silver medalist(s)	Moguls
6 January 2018	Calgary	2nd place, silver medalist(s)	Moguls
11 January 2018	Deer Valley	2nd place, silver medalist(s)	Moguls
20 January 2018	Tremblant	3rd place, bronze medalist(s)	Moguls
