= Jimi Salonen =

Finnish freestyle skier

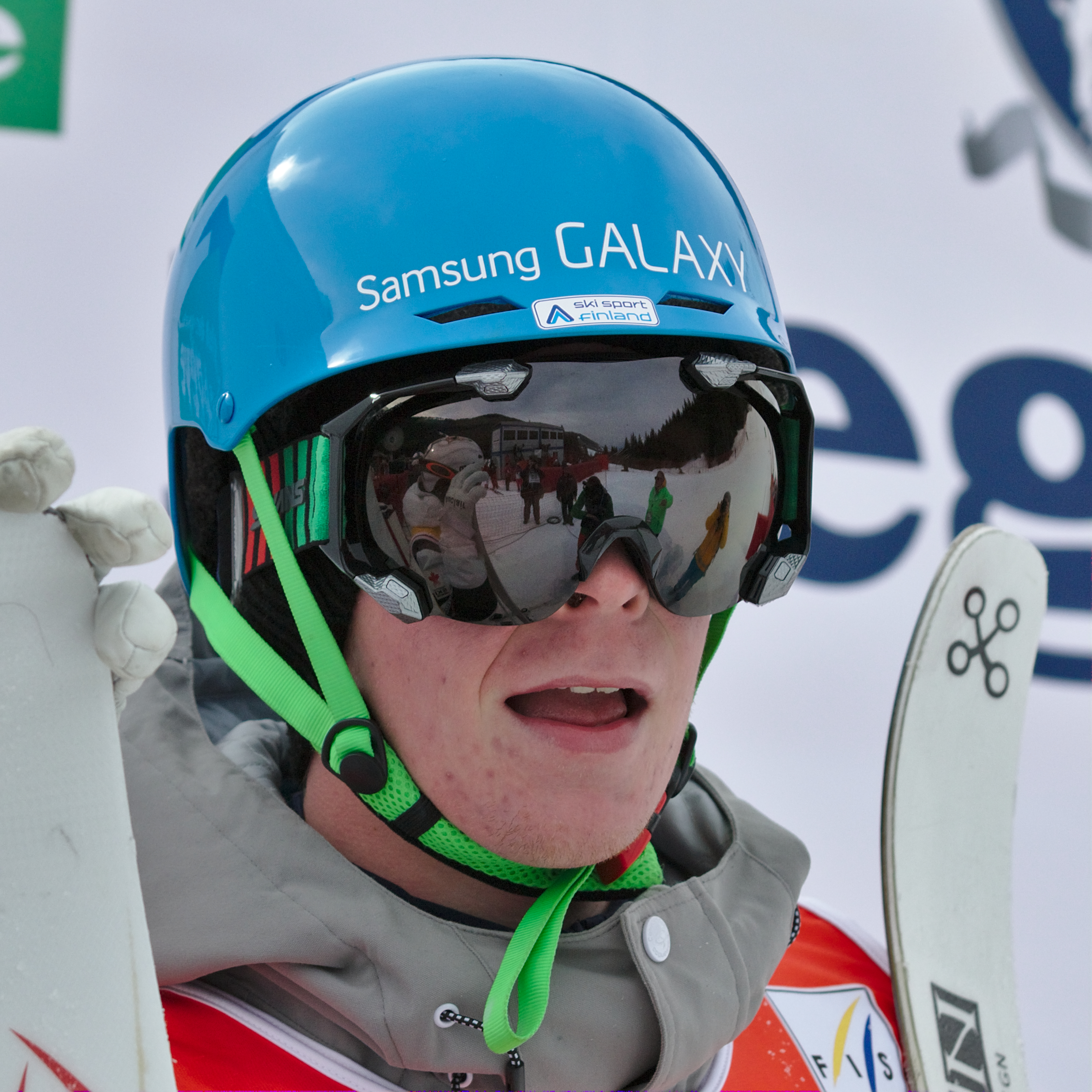
- Salonen in 2015

Personal information
- Born: 3 October 1994 (age 31) Muurame, Finland

Sport
- Sport: Skiing

Jimi Salonen (born 3 October 1994 in Muurame) is a Finnish freestyle skier, specializing in moguls.

Salonen competed at the 2014 Winter Olympics for Finland. He placed 20th in the first qualifying round in the moguls, not advancing. He then finished 3rd in the second qualifying round, advancing to the final. In the first run of the three-run final, he placed 18th, failing to advance.

As of April 2014, his best showing at the World Championships is 8th, in the 2013 dual moguls.

Salonen made his World Cup debut in December 2011. As of April 2014, his best World Cup finish is 13th, at Val St. Come in 2013–14. His best World Cup overall finish in moguls is 33rd, in 2013–14.
