= Pavel Kolmakov =

Kazakh freestyle skier (born 1996)

Personal information
- Native name: Павел Анатольевич Колмаков
- Nationality: Kazakh
- Born: 14 August 1996 (age 29) Ust-Kamenogorsk, Kazakhstan
- Height: 1.70 m (5 ft 7 in)
- Weight: 78 kg (172 lb)

Sport
- Country: Kazakhstan
- Sport: Freestyle skiing
- Event: Moguls
Medal record
Men's freestyle skiing
Representing Kazakhstan
World Championships
Bronze medal – third place	2021 Almaty	Moguls
Winter Universiade
Gold medal – first place	2015 Granada	Moguls
Silver medal – second place	2019 Krasnoyarsk	Dual moguls
Bronze medal – third place	2017 Almaty	Moguls
Bronze medal – third place	2017 Almaty	Dual moguls

Pavel Anatolyevich Kolmakov (Russian: Павел Анатольевич Колмаков; born 14 August 1996) is a Kazakhstani freestyle skier, specializing in moguls. He represented Kazakhstan at four Winter Olympics (2014, 2018, 2022, 2026).

Kolmakov competed at the 2014 Winter Olympics for Kazakhstan. He placed 11th in the first qualifying round in the moguls, not advancing. He then finished 4th in the second qualifying round, moving on to the final. In the first run of the final, he placed 11th, advancing to the second run, where he finished 10th, not advancing to the final medal run.

As of April 2014, his best showing at the World Championships is 37th, in the 2013 moguls.

Kolmakov made his World Cup debut in December 2012. As of April 2014, his best World Cup finish is 10th, in a moguls event at Deer Valley in 2013–14. His best World Cup overall finish in moguls is 39th, in 2013–14.
