= 2011–12 FIS Freestyle Skiing World Cup =

Freestyle skiing competitive season

Freestyle Skiing World Cup 2011/12
Discipline	Men	Women
Overall	(Canada) Mikaël Kingsbury	(United States) Hannah Kearney
Moguls	(Canada) Mikaël Kingsbury	(United States) Hannah Kearney
Aerials	(Canada) Olivier Rochon	(China) Mengtao Xu
Ski Cross	(Slovenia) Filip Flisar	(Canada) Marielle Thompson
Halfpipe	(United States) David Wise	(United States) Brita Sigourney
Slopestyle	(Switzerland) Cyrill Hunziker (United States) Tom Wallisch	(Canada) Kaya Turski
- Nations Cup: United States

Competition
Locations	25	25
Individual	37	37
Cancelled	1	1

The 2011/12 FIS Freestyle Skiing World Cup was the thirty third World Cup season in freestyle skiing organised by International Ski Federation. The season started on 9 December 2011 and ended on 18 March 2012. This season included five disciplines: moguls, aerials, ski cross, halfpipe and slopestyle.

== Men ==
=== Moguls ===
Num	Season	Date	Place	Event	Winner	Second	Third
42	1	20 December 2011	(France) Méribel	DM	(Canada) Mikaël Kingsbury	(France) Anthony Benna	(United States) Sho Kashima
43	2	14 January 2012	(Canada) Mont Gabriel	DM	(Canada) Mikaël Kingsbury	(United States) Jeremy Cota	(Russia) Sergey Volkov
44	3	4 February 2012	(United States) Deer Valley	DM	(Russia) Sergey Volkov	(Canada) Mikaël Kingsbury	(Russia) Andrey Volkov
45	4	19 February 2012	(Japan) Naeba	DM	(United States) Patrick Deneen	(Canada) Mikaël Kingsbury	(Canada) Philippe Marquis
46	5	10 March 2012	(Sweden) Åre	DM	(United States) Patrick Deneen	(United States) Jeremy Cota	(Canada) Mikaël Kingsbury
47	6	18 March 2011	(France) Megève	DM	(United States) Patrick Deneen	(Canada) Mikaël Kingsbury	(Canada) Marc-Antoine Gagnon
287	1	10 December 2011	(Finland) Rukatunturi	MO	(Canada) Mikaël Kingsbury	(United States) Sho Kashima	(France) Anthony Benna
288	2	19 January 2012	(United States) Lake Placid	MO	(Canada) Mikaël Kingsbury	(United States) Patrick Deneen	(Canada) Philippe Marquis
289	3	28 January 2012	(Canada) Calgary	MO	(Canada) Mikaël Kingsbury	(United States) Jeremy Cota	(United States) Sho Kashima
290	4	2 February 2012	(United States) Deer Valley	MO	(Canada) Mikaël Kingsbury	(Canada) Alexandre Bilodeau	(Norway) Vinjar Slatten
291	5	12 February 2012	(China) Beida Lake	MO	(Canada) Mikaël Kingsbury	(Kazakhstan) Dmitriy Reiherd (Canada) Philippe Marquis	
292	6	18 February 2012	(Japan) Naeba	MO	(Canada) Mikaël Kingsbury	(United States) Jeremy Cota	(Canada) Cedric Rochon
293	7	9 March 2012	(Sweden) Åre	MO	(Canada) Philippe Marquis	(Canada) Mikaël Kingsbury	(Japan) Sho Endo

=== Ski Cross ===
Num	Season	Date	Place	Event	Winner	Second	Third
65	1	17 December 2011	(Italy) Innichen	SX	(Canada) Brady Leman	(Russia) Egor Korotkov	(Canada) David Duncan
66	2	18 December 2011	(Italy) Innichen	SX	(Austria) Andreas Matt	(Russia) Egor Korotkov	(Switzerland) Alex Fiva
67	3	7 January 2012	(Austria) St. Johann	SX	(Switzerland) Alex Fiva	(Canada) Brady Leman	(Germany) Daniel Bohnacker
68	4	11 January 2012	(France) Alpe d'Huez	SX	(Slovenia) Filip Flisar	(Canada) Chris Del Bosco	(Sweden) Lars Lewen
69	5	15 January 2012	(France) Les Contamines	SX	(Switzerland) Alex Fiva	(Norway) Didrik Bastian Juell	(Canada) Nick Zoricic
70	6	3 February 2012	(Canada) Blue Mountain	SX	(Canada) Brady Leman	(Canada) Chris Del Bosco	(Austria) Andreas Matt
71	7	25 February 2012	(Germany) Bischofswiesen	SX	(Canada) Tristan Tafel	(United States) John Teller	(Canada) Chris Del Bosco
72	8	26 February 2012	(Germany) Bischofswiesen	SX	(Slovenia) Filip Flisar	(Canada) David Duncan	(France) Jean-Frédéric Chapuis
73	9	3 March 2012	(Sweden) Branäs	SX	(Finland) Jouni Pellinen	(Slovenia) Filip Flisar	(Austria) Andreas Matt
74	10	10 March 2012	(Switzerland) Grindelwald	SX	(Slovenia) Filip Flisar	(United States) John Teller	(Norway) Didrik Bastian Juell
		11 March 2012	(Switzerland) Grindelwald	SX	tragic accident of Nick Zoricic		

=== Aerials ===
Num	Season	Date	Place	Event	Winner	Second	Third
283	1	15 January 2012	(Canada) Mont Gabriel	AE	(Russia) Pavel Krotov	(Canada) Olivier Rochon	(Japan) Naoya Tabara
284	2	20 January 2012	(United States) Lake Placid	AE	(China) Zongyang Jia	(China) Zhongqing Liu	(Belarus) Anton Kushnir
285	3	21 January 2012	(United States) Lake Placid	AE	(Switzerland) Thomas Lambert	(Switzerland) Renato Ulrich	(Russia) Petr Medulich
286	4	29 January 2012	(Canada) Calgary	AE	(Canada) Olivier Rochon	(China) Guangpu Qi	(China) Zongyang Jia
287	5	3 February 2012	(United States) Deer Valley	AE	(China) Zongyang Jia	(United States) Dylan Ferguson	(Canada) Olivier Rochon
288	6	11 February 2012	(China) Beida Lake	AE	(China) Guangpu Qi	(China) Zongyang Jia	(Canada) Olivier Rochon
289	7	17 February 2012	(Austria) Kreischberg	AE	(United States) Scotty Bahrke	(Belarus) Maxim Gustik	(United States) Dylan Ferguson
290	8	25 February 2012	(Belarus) Minsk	AE	(Ukraine) Stanislav Kravchuk	(Ukraine) Oleksandr Abramenko	(Switzerland) Thomas Lambert
291	9	10 March 2012	(Russia) Moscow	AE	(China) Zongyang Jia	(Belarus) Denis Osipau	(Canada) Olivier Rochon
292	10	17 March 2012	(Norway) Myrkdalen-Voss	AE	(Belarus) Dmitri Dashinski	(China) Hangzhou	(Ukraine) Oleksandr Abramenko

=== Halfpipe ===
Num	Season	Date	Place	Event	Winner	Second	Third
16	1	9 December 2011	(United States) Copper Mountain	HP	(United States) Wing Tai Barrymore	(United States) Torin Yater-Wallace	(United States) Duncan Adams
17	2	4 March 2012	(United States) Mammoth	HP	(United States) David Wise	(Canada) Noah Bowman	(France) Benoit Valentin

=== Slopestyle ===
Num	Season	Date	Place	Event	Winner	Second	Third
1	1	25 February 2012	(Finland) Jyväskylä	SS	(Switzerland) Cyrill Hunziker	(Finland) Antti-Jussi Kemppainen	(Norway) Per Kristian Hunder
2	2	4 March 2012	(United States) Mammoth	SS	(United States) Tom Wallisch	(Canada) Alex Bellemare	(United States) Joss Christensen

== Ladies ==
=== Moguls ===
Num	Season	Date	Place	Event	Winner	Second	Third
41	1	20 December 2011	(France) Méribel	DM	(United States) Hannah Kearney	(Canada) Justine Dufour-Lapointe	(United States) Heather McPhie
42	2	14 January 2012	(Canada) Mont Gabriel	DM	(United States) Hannah Kearney	(Canada) Justine Dufour-Lapointe	(Russia) Ekaterina Stolyarova
43	3	4 February 2012	(United States) Deer Valley	DM	(United States) Hannah Kearney	(Canada) Justine Dufour-Lapointe	(United States) Heather McPhie
44	4	19 February 2012	(Japan) Naeba	DM	(Canada) Audrey Robichaud	(Japan) Aiko Uemura	(Japan) Miki Ito
45	5	10 March 2012	(Sweden) Åre	DM	(United States) Hannah Kearney	(Czech Republic) Nikola Sudová	(United States) Heather McPhie
46	6	18 March 2011	(France) Megève	DM	(Canada) Justine Dufour-Lapointe	(Japan) Miki Ito	(Canada) Chloé Dufour-Lapointe
288	1	10 December 2011	(Finland) Rukatunturi	MO	(United States) Hannah Kearney	(United States) Eliza Outtrim	(Czech Republic) Nikola Sudová
289	2	19 January 2012	(United States) Lake Placid	MO	(United States) Hannah Kearney	(Canada) Justine Dufour-Lapointe	(Czech Republic) Nikola Sudová
290	3	28 January 2012	(Canada) Calgary	MO	(United States) Hannah Kearney	(Canada) Justine Dufour-Lapointe	(United States) K.C. Oakley
291	4	2 February 2012	(United States) Deer Valley	MO	(United States) Hannah Kearney	(United States) Heather McPhie	(Australia) Britteny Cox
292	5	12 February 2012	(China) Beida Lake	MO	(United States) Hannah Kearney	(Canada) Justine Dufour-Lapointe	(Kazakhstan) Yulia Galysheva
293	6	18 February 2012	(Japan) Naeba	MO	(United States) Hannah Kearney	(Canada) Audrey Robichaud	(Canada) Justine Dufour-Lapointe
294	7	9 March 2012	(Sweden) Åre	MO	(United States) Hannah Kearney	(Canada) Chloé Dufour-Lapointe	(Japan) Arisa Murata

=== Ski Cross ===
Num	Season	Date	Place	Event	Winner	Second	Third
66	1	17 December 2011	(Italy) Innichen	SX	(Canada) Kelsey Serwa	(Switzerland) Sanna Lüdi	(Canada) Marielle Thompson
67	2	18 December 2011	(Italy) Innichen	SX	(Canada) Kelsey Serwa|	(Switzerland) Sanna Lüdi	(Switzerland) Katrin Müller
68	3	7 January 2012	(Austria) St. Johann	SX	(France) Ophélie David	(Germany) Anna Woerner	(France) Alizée Baron
69	4	11 January 2012	(France) Alpe d'Huez	SX	(Switzerland) Sanna Lüdi	(Canada) Marielle Thompson	(Austria) Andrea Limbacher
70	5	15 January 2012	(France) Les Contamines	SX	(Switzerland) Sanna Lüdi	(France) Alizée Baron	(France) Ophélie David
71	6	3 February 2012	(Canada) Blue Mountain	SX	(Canada) Marielle Thompson	(Austria) Katrin Ofner	(Switzerland) Katrin Müller
72	7	25 February 2012	(Germany) Bischofswiesen	SX	(Austria) Andrea Limbacher	(France) Ophélie David	(France) Alizée Baron
73	8	26 February 2012	(Germany) Bischofswiesen	SX	(Switzerland) Katrin Müller	(France) Ophélie David	(Canada) Marielle Thompson
74	9	3 March 2012	(Sweden) Branäs	SX	(Canada) Marielle Thompson	(Switzerland) Emilie Serain	(France) Ophélie David
75	10	10 March 2012	(Switzerland) Grindelwald	SX	(Canada) Marielle Thompson	(Russia) Maria Komissarova	(Norway) Marte Høie Gjefsen
		11 March 2012	(Switzerland) Grindelwald	SX	tragic accident of Nick Zoricic		

=== Aerials ===
Num	Season	Date	Place	Event	Winner	Second	Third
286	1	15 January 2012	(Canada) Mont Gabriel	AE	(Ukraine) Olha Volkova	(United States) Emily Cook	(Australia) Laura Peel
287	2	20 January 2012	(United States) Lake Placid	AE	(China) Mengtao Xu	(China) Shuang Cheng	(China) Fanyu Kong
288	3	21 January 2012	(United States) Lake Placid	AE	(China) Mengtao Xu	(China) Shuang Cheng	(China) Fanyu Kong
289	4	29 January 2012	(Canada) Calgary	AE	(China) Mengtao Xu	(China) Shuang Cheng	(Ukraine) Olha Volkova
290	5	3 February 2012	(United States) Deer Valley	AE	(China) Mengtao Xu	(China) Shuang Cheng	(China) Fanyu Kong
291	6	11 February 2012	(China) Beida Lake	AE	(China) Xin Zhang	(China) Mengtao Xu	(China) Shuang Cheng
292	7	17 February 2012	(Austria) Kreischberg	AE	(Australia) Laura Peel	(Ukraine) Olha Volkova	(China) Yu Yang
293	8	25 February 2012	(Belarus) Minsk	AE	(China) Yu Yang	(Switzerland) Tanja Schaerer	(China) Xin Zhang
294	9	10 March 2012	(Russia) Moscow	AE	(China) Fanyu Kong	(China) Mengtao Xu	(China) Shuang Cheng
295	10	17 March 2012	(Norway) Myrkdalen-Voss	AE	(China) Mengtao Xu	(China) Shuang Cheng	(China) Xin Zhang

=== Halfpipe ===
Num	Season	Date	Place	Event	Winner	Second	Third
16	1	9 December 2011	(United States) Copper Mountain	HP	(United States) Brita Sigourney	(Canada) Rosalind Groenewoud	(Switzerland) Virginie Faivre
17	2	4 March 2012	(United States) Mammoth	HP	(United States) Brita Sigourney	(Canada) Rosalind Groenewoud	(United States) Maddie Bowman

=== Slopestyle ===
Num	Season	Date	Place	Event	Winner	Second	Third
1	1	25 February 2012	(Finland) Jyväskylä	SS	(Norway) Linn-Ida Murud	(Switzerland) Eveline Bhend	(Slovakia) Natalia Slepecka
2	2	4 March 2012	(United States) Mammoth	SS	(Canada) Kaya Turski	(United States) Devin Logan	(United States) Emilia Wint

== Men's standings ==
=== Overall ===
Rank		Points
1	(Canada) Mikaël Kingsbury	90.77
2	(United States) Patrick Deneen	55.00
3	(Canada) Olivier Rochon	54.30
4	(United States) Jeremy Cota	51.85
5	(Slovenia) Filip Flisar	48.20

- Standings after 37 races.

=== Moguls ===
Rank		Points
1	(Canada) Mikaël Kingsbury	1180
2	(United States) Patrick Deneen	715
3	(United States) Jeremy Cota	674
4	(Canada) Philippe Marquis	515
5	(Canada) Marc-Antoine Gagnon	449

- Standings after 13 races.

=== Aerials ===
Rank		Points
1	(Canada) Olivier Rochon	543
2	(China) Zongyang Jia	452
3	(Switzerland) Thomas Lambert	392
4	(United States) Dylan Ferguson	371
5	(China) Zhongqing Liu	331

- Standings after 10 races.

=== Ski Cross ===
Rank		Points
1	(Slovenia) Filip Flisar	482
2	(Canada) Brady Leman	443
3	(Switzerland) Alex Fiva	434
4	(Canada) Chris Del Bosco	396
5	(Austria) Andreas Matt	393

- Standings after 10 races.

=== Halfpipe ===
Rank		Points
1	(United States) David Wise	140
2	(United States) Torin Yater-Wallace	125
3	(United States) Wing Tai Barrymore	100
4	(Canada) Noah Bowman	80
5	(United States) Tucker Perkins	71

- Standings after 2 races.

=== Slopestyle ===
Rank		Points
1	(Switzerland) Cyrill Hunziker	100
1	(United States) Tom Wallisch	100
3	(Finland) Antti-Jussi Kemppainen	81
4	(Canada) Alex Bellemare	80
5	(United States) Colby West	63

- Standings after 2 races.

== Ladies' standings ==
=== Overall ===
Rank		Points
1	(United States) Hannah Kearney	91.92
2	(China) Mengtao Xu	66.00
3	(Canada) Marielle Thompson	59.00
4	(Canada) Justine Dufour-Lapointe	56.31
5	(France) Ophélie David	53.00

- Standings after 37 races.

=== Moguls ===
Rank		Points
1	(United States) Hannah Kearney	1195
2	(Canada) Justine Dufour-Lapointe	732
3	(Czech Republic) Nikola Sudová	565
4	(United States) Heather McPhie	533
5	(Canada) Chloé Dufour-Lapointe	522

- Standings after 13 races.

=== Aerials ===
Rank		Points
1	(China) Mengtao Xu	660
2	(China) Shuang Cheng	520
3	(Ukraine) Olha Volkova	480
4	(Australia) Laura Peel	407
5	(Switzerland) Tanja Schaerer	394

- Standings after 10 races.

=== Ski Cross ===
Rank		Points
1	(Canada) Marielle Thompson	590
2	(France) Ophélie David	530
3	(Switzerland) Katrin Müller	423
4	(Switzerland) Sanna Lüdi	389
5	(Austria) Andrea Limbacher	388

- Standings after 10 races.

=== Halfpipe ===
Rank		Points
1	(United States) Brita Sigourney	200
2	(Canada) Rosalind Groenewoud	160
3	(United States) Maddie Bowman	110
4	(United States) Devin Logan	79
5	(France) Anais Caradeux	77

- Standings after 2 races.

=== Slopestyle ===
Rank		Points
1	(Norway) Linn-Ida Murud	100
1	(Canada) Kaya Turski	100
3	(United States) Devin Logan	80
3	(Switzerland) Eveline Bhend	80
5	(Japan) Chiho Takao	76

- Standings after 2 races.

== Nations Cup ==
=== Overall ===
Rank		Points
1	United States	1034
2	Canada	952
3	Switzerland	409
4	China	364
5	Russia	355

- Standings after 64 races.

=== Men ===
Rank		Points
1	United States	585
2	Canada	560
3	Switzerland	215
4	Russia	208
5	France	173

- Standings after 32 races.

=== Ladies ===
Rank		Points
1	United States	449
2	Canada	392
3	China	234
4	Switzerland	194
5	Australia	185

- Standings after 32 races.
