= 2010–11 FIS Freestyle Skiing World Cup =

Freestyle skiing competitive season

Freestyle Skiing World Cup 2010/11
Discipline	Men	Women
Overall	(France) Guilbaut Colas	(United States) Hannah Kearney
Moguls	(France) Guilbaut Colas	(United States) Hannah Kearney
Aerials	(China) Qi Guangpu	(China) Shuang Cheng
Ski Cross	(Austria) Andreas Matt	(Sweden) Anna Holmlund
Halfpipe	(France) Benoit Valentin	(Canada) Sarah Burke
- Nations Cup: Canada

Competition
Locations	22	22
Individual	32	32

The 2010/11 FIS Freestyle Skiing World Cup was the thirty-second World Cup season in freestyle skiing organised by International Ski Federation. The season started on 11 December 2010 and lasted until 20 March 2011. This season included four disciplines: moguls, aerials, ski cross and halfpipe.

== Men ==
=== Moguls ===
Num	Season	Date	Place	Event	Winner	Second	Third
37	1	15 December 2010	(France) Meribel	DM	(France) Guilbaut Colas	(United States) Patrick Deneen	(United States) Bryon Wilson
38	2	15 January 2011	(Canada) Mont Gabriel	DM	(Canada) Alexandre Bilodeau	(Canada) Mikaël Kingsbury	(France) Guilbaut Colas
39	3	26 February 2011	(Czech Republic) Mariánské Lázně	DM	(Canada) Alexandre Bilodeau	(Canada) Mikaël Kingsbury	(United States) Jeremy Cota
40	4	12 March 2011	(Sweden) Åre	DM	(Canada) Alexandre Bilodeau	(France) Guilbaut Colas	(United States) Patrick Deneen
41	5	20 March 2011	(Norway) Myrkdalen-Voss	DM	(France) Guilbaut Colas	(Canada) Mikael Kingsbury	(Canada) Alexandre Bilodeau
281	1	11 December 2010	(Finland) Ruka	MO	(United States) Patrick Deneen	(Canada) Mikaël Kingsbury	(France) Guilbaut Colas
282	2	21 December 2010	(China) Beida Lake	MO	(Canada) Mikaël Kingsbury	(France) Guilbaut Colas	(Canada) Pierre-Alexandre Rousseau
283	3	22 January 2011	(United States) Lake Placid	MO	(France) Guilbaut Colas	(Canada) Alexandre Bilodeau	(United States) Jeremy Cota
284	4	23 January 2011	(United States) Lake Placid	MO	(France) Guilbaut Colas	(Canada) Mikaël Kingsbury	(Canada) Pierre-Alexandre Rousseau
285	5	29 January 2011	(Canada) Calgary	MO	(Canada) Mikaël Kingsbury	(Canada) Alexandre Bilodeau	(Russia) Alexandr Smyshlyaev
286	6	11 March 2011	(Sweden) Åre	MO	(Canada) Alexandre Bilodeau	(France) Guilbaut Colas	(Canada) Mikaël Kingsbury

=== Ski Cross ===
Num	Season	Date	Place	Event	Winner	Second	Third
54	1	18 December 2010	(Italy) Innichen	SX	(Switzerland) Patrick Gasser	(Austria) Andreas Matt	(Austria) Thomas Zangerl
55	2	19 December 2010	(Italy) Innichen	SX	(Australia) Scott Kneller	(Switzerland) Alex Fiva	(United States) John Teller
56	3	7 January 2011	(Austria) St. Johann in Tirol	SX	(United States) John Teller	(Canada) Nick Zoricic	(Austria) Thomas Zangerl
57	4	12 January 2011	(France) Alpe d'Huez	SX	(Germany) Daniel Bohnacker	(Austria) Andreas Matt	(Austria) Patrick Koller
58	5	16 January 2011	(France) Les Contamines	SX	(Canada) Christopher Delbosco	(Austria) Andreas Matt	(Russia) Egor Korotkov
59	6	29 January 2011	(Germany) Grasgehren	SX	(Austria) Andreas Matt	(Austria) Patrick Koller	(Switzerland) Armin Niederer
60	7	11 February 2011	(Canada) Blue Mountain	SX	(Canada) Christopher Delbosco	(Austria) Andreas Matt	(Czech Republic) Tomas Kraus
61	8	3 March 2011	(Switzerland) Grindelwald	SX	(Austria) Andreas Matt	(Finland) Jouni Pellinen	(Canada) Christopher Delbosco
62	9	6 March 2011	(Switzerland) Meiringen-Hasliberg	SX	(Finland) Jouni Pellinen	(Austria) Andreas Matt	(Germany) Daniel Bohnacker
63	10	13 March 2011	(Sweden) Branas	SX	(Austria) Andreas Matt	(Canada) Christopher Delbosco	(Switzerland) Conradign Netzer
64	11	19 March 2011	(Norway) Myrkdalen-Voss	SX	(Canada) Christopher Delbosco	(Switzerland) Conradign Netzer	(Czech Republic) Tomas Kraus

=== Aerials ===
Num	Season	Date	Place	Event	Winner	Second	Third
276	1	17 December 2010	(China) Beida Lake	AE	(China) Zongyang Jia	(Canada) Warren Shouldice	(China) Chao Wu
277	2	18 December 2010	(China) Beida Lake	AE	(China) Guangpu Qi	(China) Zongyang Jia	(Switzerland) Renato Ulrich
278	3	16 January 2011	(Canada) Mont Gabriel	AE	(Belarus) Anton Kushnir	(China) Guangpu Qi	(Ukraine) Stanislav Kravchuk
279	4	21 January 2011	(United States) Lake Placid	AE	(China) Guangpu Qi	(United States) Ryan St. Onge	(Belarus) Anton Kushnir
280	5	29 January 2011	(Canada) Calgary	AE	(Canada) Warren Shouldice	(Switzerland) Renato Ulrich	(United States) Scotty Bahrke
281	6	12 February 2011	(Russia) Moscow	AE	(Belarus) Anton Kushnir	(Ukraine) Stanislav Kravchuk	(China) Guangpu Qi
282	7	19 February 2011	(Belarus) Minsk/Raubichi	AE	(Belarus) Anton Kushnir	(Ukraine) Stanislav Kravchuk	(Belarus) Denis Osipau

=== Halfpipe ===
Num	Season	Date	Place	Event	Winner	Second	Third
13	1	21 January 2011	(Austria) Kreischberg	HP	(France) Xavier Bertoni	(France) Benoit Valentin	(Switzerland) Nils Lauper
14	2	20 March 2011	(France) La Plagne	HP	(United States) Torin Yatter-Wallace	(France) Benoit Valentin	(United States) David Wise
15	3	20 March 2011	(France) La Plagne	HP	(France) Kevin Rolland	(United States) David Wise	(Canada) Justin Dorey

== Women ==
=== Moguls ===
Num	Season	Date	Place	Event	Winner	Second	Third
36	1	15 December 2010	(France) Meribel	DM	(Kazakhstan) Yulia Galysheva	(United States) Hannah Kearney	(Canada) Justine Dufour-Lapointe
37	2	15 January 2011	(Canada) Mont Gabriel	DM	(Canada) Justine Dufour-Lapointe	(Russia) Anastassia Gunchenko	(Canada) Jennifer Heil
38	3	26 February 2011	(Czech Republic) Mariánské Lázně	DM	(United States) Hannah Kearney	(Canada) Jennifer Heil	(Canada) Chloé Dufour-Lapointe
39	4	12 March 2011	(Sweden) Åre	DM	(United States) Hannah Kearney	(Canada) Justine Dufour-Lapointe	(Canada) Jennifer Heil
40	5	20 March 2011	(Norway) Myrkdalen-Voss	MO	(United States) Hannah Kearney	(Canada) Jennifer Heil	(Canada) Justine Dufour-Lapointe
282	1	11 December 2010	(Finland) Rukatunturi	MO	(United States) Hannah Kearney	(Canada) Jennifer Heil	(Canada) Kristi Richards
283	2	21 December 2010	(China) Beida Lake	MO	(United States) Hannah Kearney	(Canada) Jennifer Heil	(Canada) Kristi Richards
284	3	22 January 2011	(United States) Lake Placid	MO	(United States) Hannah Kearney	(Canada) Jennifer Heil	(Canada) Audrey Robichaud
285	4	23 January 2011	(United States) Lake Placid	MO	(United States) Hannah Kearney	(Canada) Chloé Dufour-Lapointe	(Canada) Kristi Richards
286	5	29 January 2011	(Canada) Calgary	MO	(United States) Hannah Kearney	(Canada) Audrey Robichaud	(Russia) Ekaterina Stolyarova
287	6	11 March 2011	(Sweden) Åre	MO	(United States) Hannah Kearney	(Canada) Jennifer Heil	(United States) Heather McPhie

=== Ski Cross ===
Num	Season	Date	Place	Event	Winner	Second	Third
55	1	18 December 2010	(Italy) Innichen	SX	(Sweden) Anna Holmlund	(Canada) Kelsey Serwa	(Czech Republic) Nikol Kucerova
56	2	19 December 2010	(Italy) Innichen	SX	(Switzerland) Fanny Smith	(Canada) Ashleigh McIvor	(Germany) Heidi Zacher
57	3	7 January 2011	(Austria) St. Johann in Tirol	SX	(Germany) Heidi Zacher	(Norway) Hedda Berntsen	(Germany) Anna Wörner
58	4	12 January 2011	(France) Alpe d'Huez	SX	(Canada) Kelsey Serwa	(Switzerland) Fanny Smith	(Canada) Ashleigh McIvor
59	5	16 January 2011	(France) Les Contamines	SX	(France) Ophelie David	(Canada) Kelsey Serwa	(Sweden) Anna Holmlund
60	6	29 January 2011	(Germany) Grasgehren	SX	(Sweden) Anna Holmlund	(Germany) Heidi Zacher	(Switzerland) Katrin Müller
61	7	11 February 2011	(Canada) Blue Mountain	SX	(Germany) Anna Wörner	(Switzerland) Fanny Smith	(Australia) Jenny Owens
62	8	3 March 2011	(Switzerland) Grindelwald	SX	(Norway) Marte Hoeie Gjefsen	(France) Ophelie David	(Germany) Heidi Zacher
63	9	6 March 2011	(Switzerland) Meiringen-Hasliberg	SX	(Sweden) Anna Holmlund	(Switzerland) Katrin Müller	(France) Ophelie David
64	10	13 March 2011	(Sweden) Branas	SX	(Sweden) Anna Holmlund	(Canada) Kelsey Serwa	(Norway) Marte Hoeie Gjefsen
65	11	19 March 2011	(Norway) Myrkdalen-Voss	SX	(Sweden) Anna Holmlund	(Canada) Kelsey Serwa	(Switzerland) Katrin Müller

=== Aerials ===
Num	Season	Date	Place	Event	Winner	Second	Third
279	1	17 December 2010	(China) Beida Lake	AE	(China) Xin Zhang	(China) Mengtao Xu	(China) Shuang Cheng
280	2	18 December 2010	(China) Beida Lake	AE	(China) Mengtao Xu	(China) Shuang Cheng	(China) Sicun Xu
281	3	16 January 2011	(Canada) Mont Gabriel	AE	(China) Mengtao Xu	(Belarus) Alla Tsuper	(China) Shuang Cheng
282	4	21 January 2011	(United States) Lake Placid	AE	(United States) Ashley Caldwell	(Belarus) Alla Tsuper	(China) Mengtao Xu
283	5	29 January 2011	(Canada) Calgary	AE	(China) Shuang Cheng	(China) Mengtao Xu	(Ukraine) Olha Volkova
284	6	12 February 2011	(Russia) Moscow	AE	(United States) Emily Cook	(Ukraine) Olha Volkova	(China) Xin Zhang
285	7	19 February 2011	(Belarus) Minsk/Raubichi	AE	(China) Shuang Cheng	(United States) Ashley Caldwell	(China) Fanyu Kong

=== Halfpipe ===
Num	Season	Date	Place	Event	Winner	Second	Third
13	1	21 January 2011	(Austria) Kreischberg	HP	(Canada) Rosalind Groenewoud	(Switzerland) Virginie Faivre	(Belgium) Katrien Aerts
14	2	20 March 2011	(France) La Plagne	HP	(Canada) Sarah Burke	(United States) Devin Logan	(France) Anaïs Caradeux
15	3	20 March 2011	(France) La Plagne	HP	(Canada) Sarah Burke	(United States) Devin Logan	(Switzerland) Virginie Faivre

== Men's standings ==
=== Overall ===
Rank		Points
1	(France) Guilbaut Colas	76.45
2	(Austria) Andreas Matt	74.91
3	(Canada) Alex Bilodeau	67.18
4	(Canada) Mikael Kingsbury	65.91
5	(China) Guangpu Qi	65.86

- Standings after 32 races.

=== Moguls ===
Rank		Points
1	(France) Guilbaut Colas	841
2	(Canada) Alexandre Bilodeau	739
3	(Canada) Mikael Kingsbury	725
4	(United States) Patrick Deneen	434
5	(United States) Jeremy Cota	407

- Standings after 11 races.

=== Aerials ===
Rank		Points
1	(China) Guangpu Qi	461
2	(Belarus) Anton Kushnir	428
3	(Switzerland) Renato Ulrich	321
4	(China) Zongyang Jia	288
5	(Canada) Warren Shouldice	259

- Standings after 7 races.

=== Ski Cross ===
Rank		Points
1	(Austria) Andreas Matt	824
2	(Canada) Christopher Delbosco	615
3	(Finland) Jouni Pellinen	462
4	(United States) John Teller	356
5	(Canada) Nick Zoricic	337

- Standings after 11 races.

=== Halfpipe ===
Rank		Points
1	(France) Benoit Valentin	205
2	(France) Xavier Bertoni	172
3	(United States) David Wise	140
4	(France) Joffrey Pollet-Villard	135
5	(France) Kevin Rolland	132

- Standings after 3 races.

== Women's standings ==
=== Overall ===
Rank		Points
1	(United States) Hannah Kearney	91.73
2	(Canada) Jennifer Heil	64.73
3	(China) Shuang Cheng	63.14
4	(Sweden) Anna Holmlund	61.09
5	(China) Mengtao Xu	60.00

- Standings after 32 races.

=== Moguls ===
Rank		Points
1	(United States) Hannah Kearney	1009
2	(Canada) Jennifer Heil	712
3	(Canada) Audrey Robichaud	466
4	(Canada) Justine Dufour-Lapointe	457
5	(United States) Heather McPhie	400

- Standings after 11 races.

=== Aerials ===
Rank		Points
1	(China) Shuang Cheng	442
2	(China) Mengtao Xu	420
3	(Ukraine) Olha Volkova	343
4	(China) Xin Zhang	273
5	(United States) Emily Cook	260

- Standings after 7 races.

=== Ski Cross ===
Rank		Points
1	(Sweden) Anna Holmlund	672
2	(Germany) Heidi Zacher	612
3	(Canada) Kelsey Serwa	610
4	(Switzerland) Fanny Smith	504
5	(France) Ophelie David	474

- Standings after 11 races.

=== Halfpipe ===
Rank		Points
1	(Canada) Sarah Burke	200
2	(Canada) Rosalind Groenewoud	200
3	(Switzerland) Virginie Faivre	185
4	(United States) Devin Logan	160
5	(Belgium) Katrien Aerts	136

- Standings after 3 races.

== Nations Cup ==
=== Overall ===
Rank		Points
1	Canada	1032
2	United States	631
3	Switzerland	463
4	China	414
5	France	411

- Standings after 64 races.

=== Men ===
Rank		Points
1	Canada	510
2	United States	330
3	France	312
4	Switzerland	284
5	China	168

- Standings after 32 races.

=== Women ===
Rank		Points
1	Canada	522
2	United States	301
3	China	246
4	Switzerland	179
5	Germany	129

- Standings after 32 races.
