= FIS Freestyle World Ski Championships 2011 – Men's moguls =

The men's moguls competition of the FIS Freestyle World Ski Championships 2011 was held at Deer Valley, United States on February 2, 2011 (qualifications and finals).

35 athletes from 17 countries competed.

== Results ==
=== Qualification ===
Rank	Bib	Name	Country	Time	Score			Total	Notes
Rank	Bib	Name	Country	Time	Turns	Air	Time	Total	Notes
1	3	Alexandre Bilodeau	Canada	24.42	13.8	5.47	6.44	25.71	Q
2	2	Mikaël Kingsbury	Canada	26.09	13.5	5.44	5.65	24.59	Q
3	1	Guilbaut Colas	France	25.03	13.8	4.47	6.15	24.42	Q
4	5	Jeremy Cota	United States	25.91	13.2	4.89	5.73	23.82	Q
5	7	Pierre-Alexandre Rousseau	Canada	25.76	12.7	4.82	5.81	23.33	Q
6	34	Ville Miettunen	Finland	26.56	12.1	5.26	5.43	22.79	Q
7	11	Jesper Björnlund	Sweden	26.21	12.5	4.45	5.59	22.54	Q
8	9	Cedric Rochon	Canada	26.14	12.3	4.58	5.63	22.51	Q
9	6	Alexandr Smyshlyaev	Russia	25.21	12.1	4.23	6.07	22.40	Q
10	17	Arttu Kiramo	Finland	26.29	12.4	4.20	5.55	22.15	Q
11	4	Patrick Deneen	United States	25.93	12.5	3.81	5.73	22.04	Q
12	10	David DiGravio	United States	27.15	12.5	4.19	5.15	21.84	Q
13	15	Joseph Discoe	United States	27.17	12.5	4.06	5.09	21.65	Q
14	30	Jussi Penttala	Finland	26.44	11.9	4.10	5.48	21.48	Q
15	25	Tevje-Lie Andersen	Norway	26.48	11.1	4.50	5.47	21.07	Q
16	32	Per Spett	Sweden	26.89	11.5	4.27	5.27	21.04	Q
17	28	Vinjar Slatten	Norway	25.27	10.6	4.31	6.04	20.95	
18	13	Nobuyuki Nishi	Japan	26.64	11.9	3.61	5.39	20.90	
19	18	Sergey Volkov	Russia	25.12	11.4	3.25	6.11	20.76	
20	31	Sam Hall	Australia	27.18	11.5	3.99	5.13	20.62	
21	12	Sho Endo	Japan	25.73	10.8	3.92	5.82	20.54	
22	26	Lukas Vaculik	Czech Republic	28.21	10.9	3.89	4.65	19.44	
23	29	Giacomo Matiz	Italy	28.05	11.0	3.71	4.72	19.43	
24	27	David Graham	Australia	28.59	10.6	3.97	4.47	19.04	
25	35	Vaclav Novak	Czech Republic	27.64	8.6	2.77	4.92	16.29	
26	38	Pablo Lafranchi	Switzerland	28.93	8.8	3.09	4.31	16.20	
27	24	Adam Gummesson	Sweden	28.04	4.7	4.55	4.73	13.98	
28	42	Gustav-Muus Thorkilsen	Denmark	32.13	8.1	2.87	2.79	13.76	
29	33	Gi-Chan Yoon	South Korea	35.29	4.5	2.51	1.30	8.31	
30	44	Ji-Hyon Kim	South Korea	32.94	4.5	1.39	2.41	8.30	
31	41	Bradley Stephenson	South Africa	33.87	1.3	2.57	1.97	5.84	
32	37	Juuso Lahtela	Finland	45.36	0.3	2.23	0.00	2.53	
33	40	Sun Renze	China	38.66	2.0	0.42	0.00	2.42	
	8	Bryon Wilson	United States					DNF	
	43	Andrew Longley	United Kingdom					DNS	

=== Final ===
Rank	Bib	Name	Country	Time	Score			Total	Notes
Rank	Bib	Name	Country	Time	Turns	Air	Time	Total	Notes
1st place, gold medalist(s)	1	Guilbaut Colas	France	23.87	14.3	5.26	6.70	26.26	
2nd place, silver medalist(s)	3	Alexandre Bilodeau	Canada	23.87	14.3	4.66	6.70	25.66	
3rd place, bronze medalist(s)	2	Mikaël Kingsbury	Canada	25.06	13.6	5.83	6.14	25.57	
4	5	Jeremy Cota	United States	25.06	13.4	5.20	6.14	24.74	
5	6	Alexandr Smyshlyaev	Russia	24.37	12.5	5.25	6.46	24.21	
6	4	Patrick Deneen	United States	24.28	12.7	4.93	6.51	24.14	
7	9	Cedric Rochon	Canada	26.11	13.2	4.88	5.64	23.72	
8	34	Ville Miettunen	Finland	25.12	12.0	5.32	6.11	23.43	
9	10	David DiGravio	United States	26.00	12.9	4.78	5.69	23.37	
10	7	Pierre-Alexandre Rousseau	Canada	25.19	12.5	4.56	6.08	23.14	
11	11	Jesper Björnlund	Sweden	25.31	12.5	4.18	6.02	22.70	
12	17	Arttu Kiramo	Finland	26.15	12.5	4.49	5.62	22.61	
13	15	Joseph Discoe	United States	25.77	12.4	4.36	5.80	22.56	
14	25	Tevje-Lie Andersen	Norway	25.84	9.8	4.78	5.77	20.35	
15	32	Per Spett	Sweden	38.76	4.2	3.33	0.00	7.53	
16	30	Jussi Penttala	Finland					DNF	
