= Deutsch-Griffen =

- Municipality
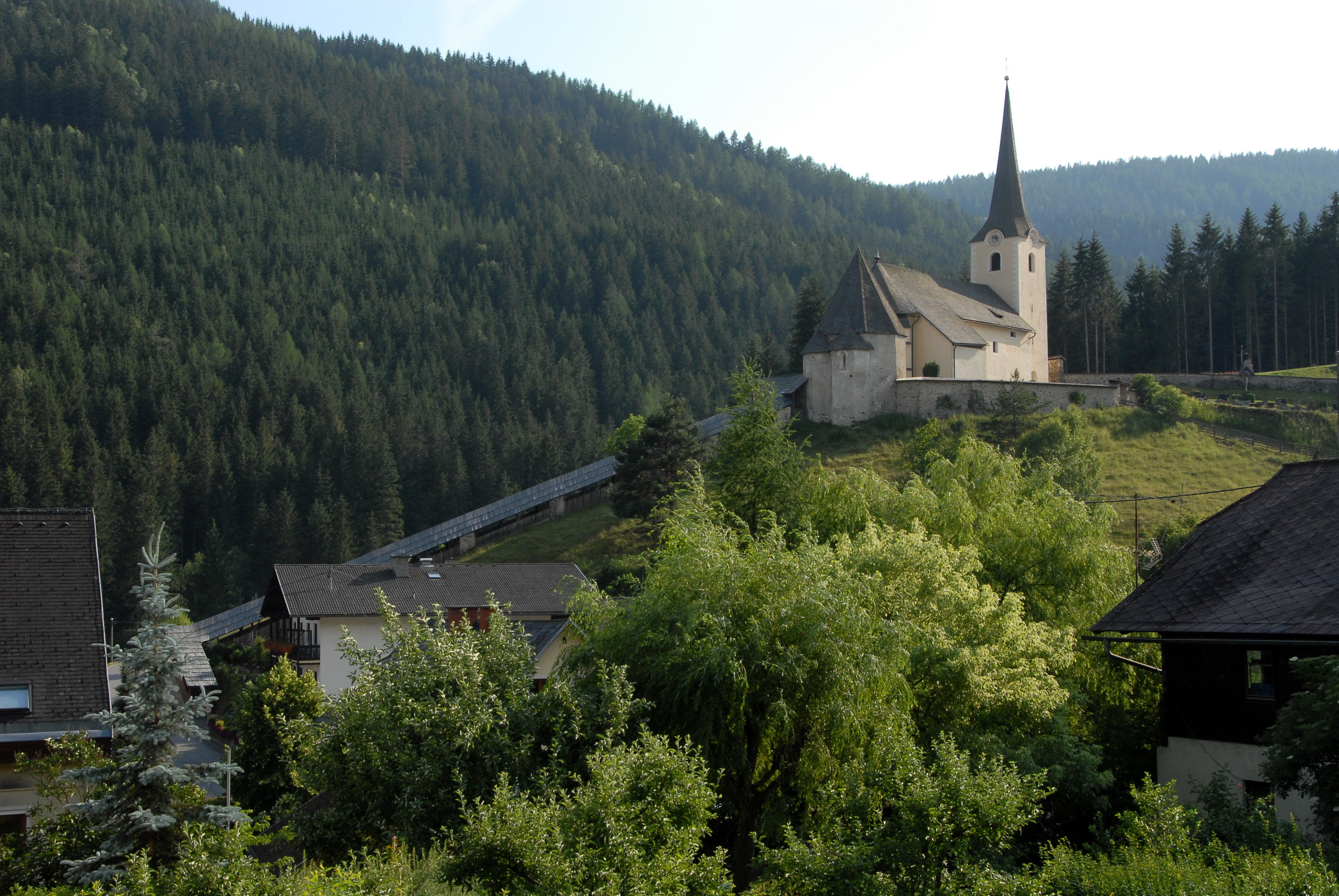
- St. Jacob Church

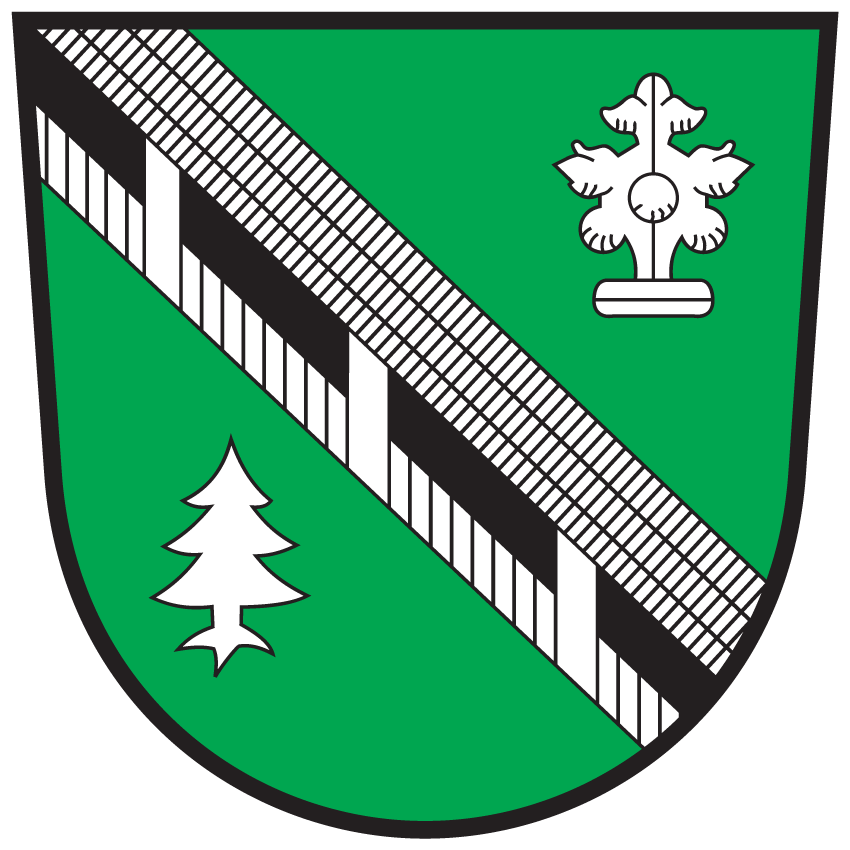
- Coat of arms

- Location within Austria
- Coordinates: 46°51′N 14°4′E
- Country: Austria
- State: Carinthia
- District: Sankt Veit an der Glan

Government
  - Mayor: Michael Reiner (FPÖ)

Area
  - Total: 71.44 km^{2} (27.58 sq mi)
- Elevation: 847 m (2,779 ft)

Population (2018-01-01)
  - Total: 908
  - Density: 12.7/km^{2} (32.9/sq mi)
- Time zone: UTC+1 (CET)
  - Summer (DST): UTC+2 (CEST)
- Postal code: 9572
- Area code: +43 (0) 4279
- Website: www.deutsch-griffen.at

Deutsch-Griffen (Slovene: Slovenj Grebinj) is a municipality in the district of Sankt Veit an der Glan in Austrian state of Carinthia.

== Geography ==
Deutsch-Griffen lies in the north of Carinthia, about 30 kilometres (19 mi) northwest of the state capital Klagenfurt. It is situated in the eastern Nock Mountains, in a left tributary valley of the Gurk River on the Griffnerbach creek. The municipal area extends from the Gurk up to the Styrian border in the north. On the northern edge, there is a sparsely populated area along the Paalbach, which is cut off from the rest of the municipality and can only be reached in a very roundabout way. Therefore, it is locally considered to belong to the Flattnitz plateau, part of the neighbouring municipality of Glödnitz. In the west, Deutsch-Griffen borders on Albeck in the Feldkirchen District.

The municipal area comprises the only cadastral community Deutsch-Griffen made up of 25 villages and hamlets.

== History ==
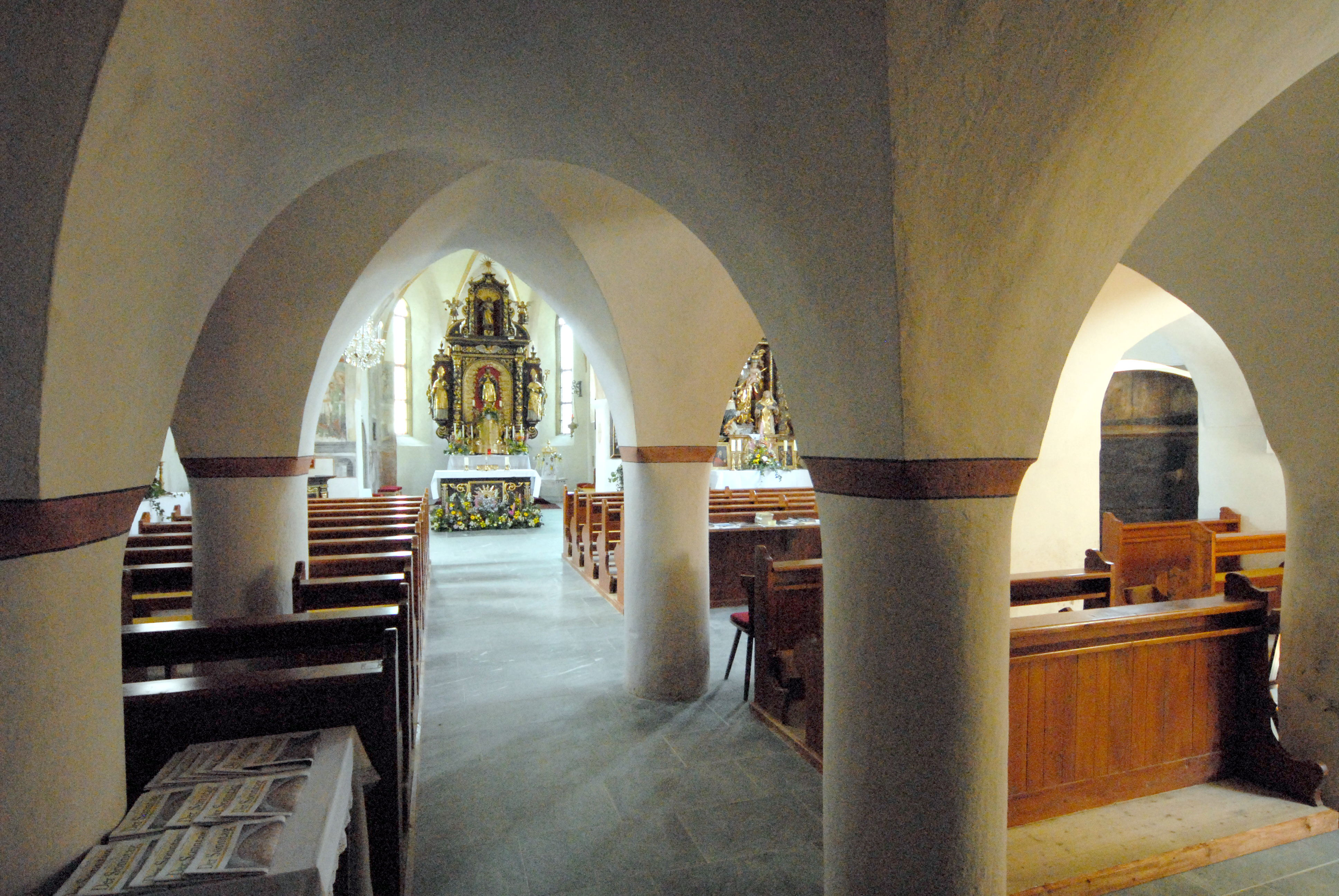
Church interior

A locality in the March of Carinthia named Grivinne was already mentioned in a 927 deed. In 1043 Countess Hemma of Gurk donated a chapel at the site, the present-day St. Jacob parish church which passed to the Diocese of Gurk in 1157. The Romanesque structure was rebuilt as a fortified church in the 15th century, when it served as a refuge for the villagers during the Ottoman Wars.

The present-day municipality emerged in 1850. it was later called Deutsch-Griffen to distinguish it from Griffen in Völkermarkt District. In a 1973 administrative reform it was merged into a large municipality with neighbouring Glödnitz and Weitensfeld but regained its independency after a local referendum in 1991.

== Politics ==
Seats in the municipal assembly (Gemeinderat) as of 2015 local elections:

- Freedom Party of Austria (FPÖ): 7
- Austrian People's Party (ÖVP): 3
- Social Democratic Party of Austria (SPÖ): 1

== Twin town ==
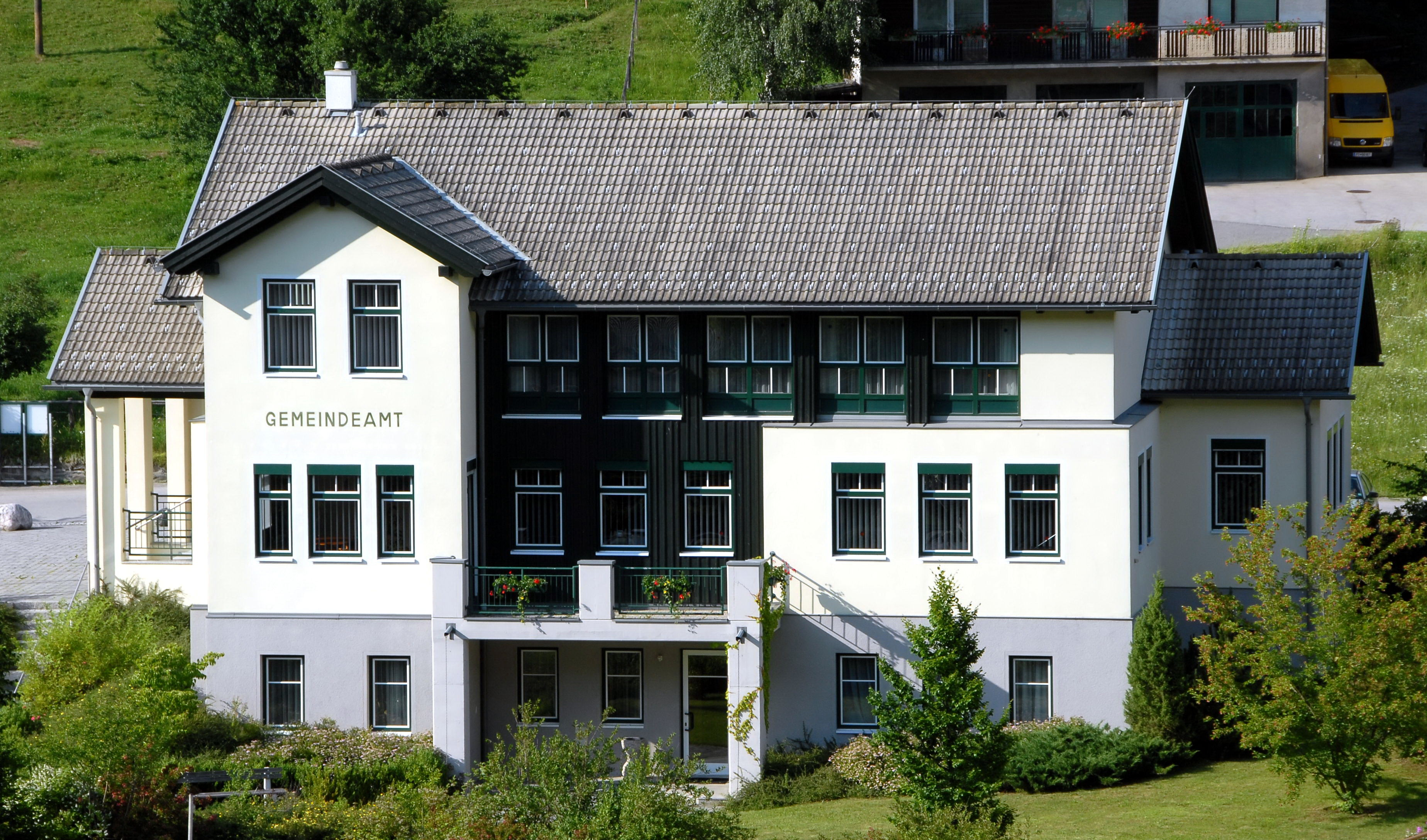
Town hall

Deutsch-Griffen is twinned with:

- Utenbach, part of Apolda, Germany, since 1993
