= Olga Volkova =

Olga Volkova may refer to:

- Olha Volkova (born 1986), Ukrainian freestyle skier
- Olga Volkova (actress) (born 1939), Russian actress
