= Flattnitzer See =

Flattnitzer See Hemmasee
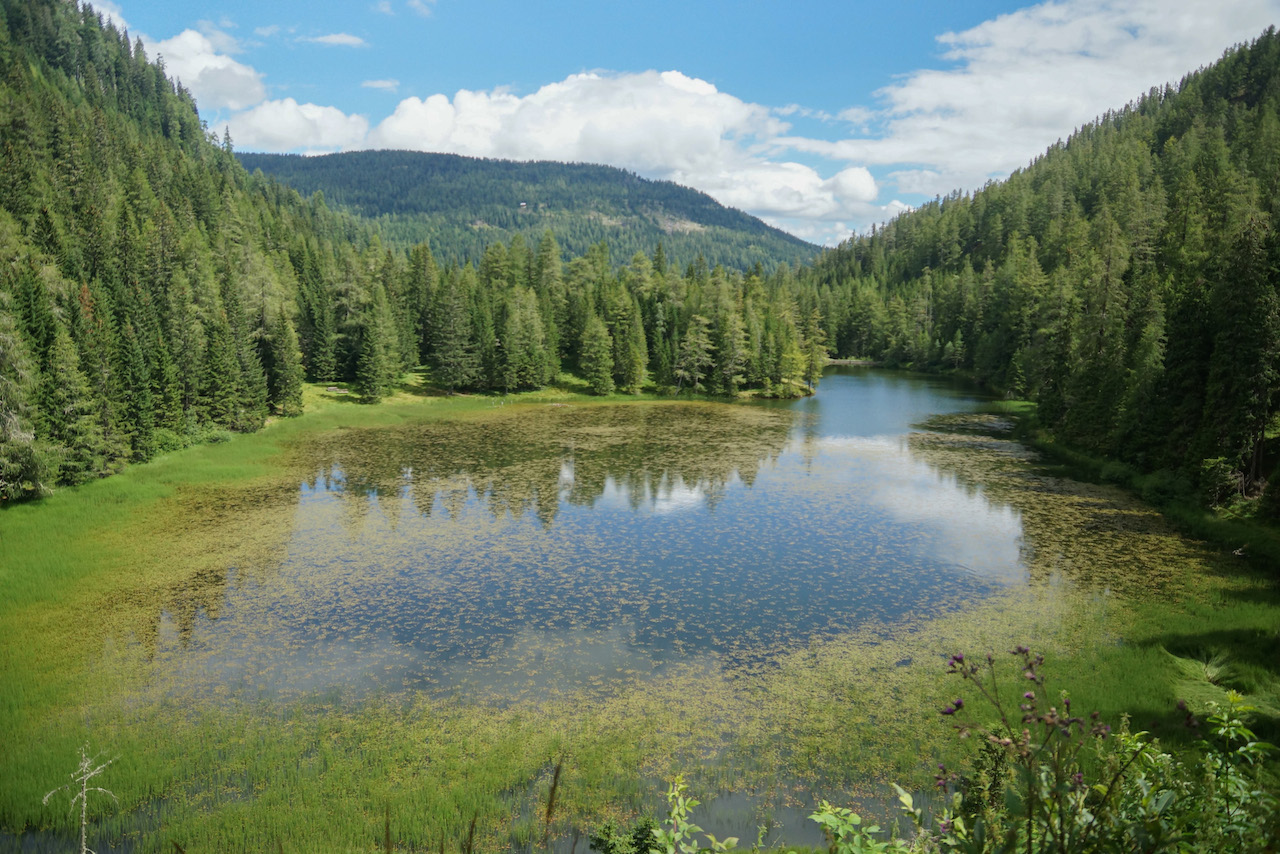

- Location within Austria
- Location: Flattnitz Pass
- Coordinates: 46°56′17.3″N 14°2′17.8″E
- Catchment area: 0.57 km^{2} (0.22 sq mi)
- Surface area: 0.0196 km^{2} (0.0076 sq mi)
- Max. depth: 2.8 m (9.2 ft)
- Water volume: 27,000 m^{3} (22 acre⋅ft)
- Surface elevation: 1,370 m (4,490 ft)

Flattnitzer See, also known as Hemmasee, is a lake near Flattnitz Pass in the Gurktal Alps. It rests in the municipality of Glödnitz, in Carinthia, Austria.
