= Flattnitz Pass =

Mountain pass in the Gurktal Alps in Carinthia, Austria

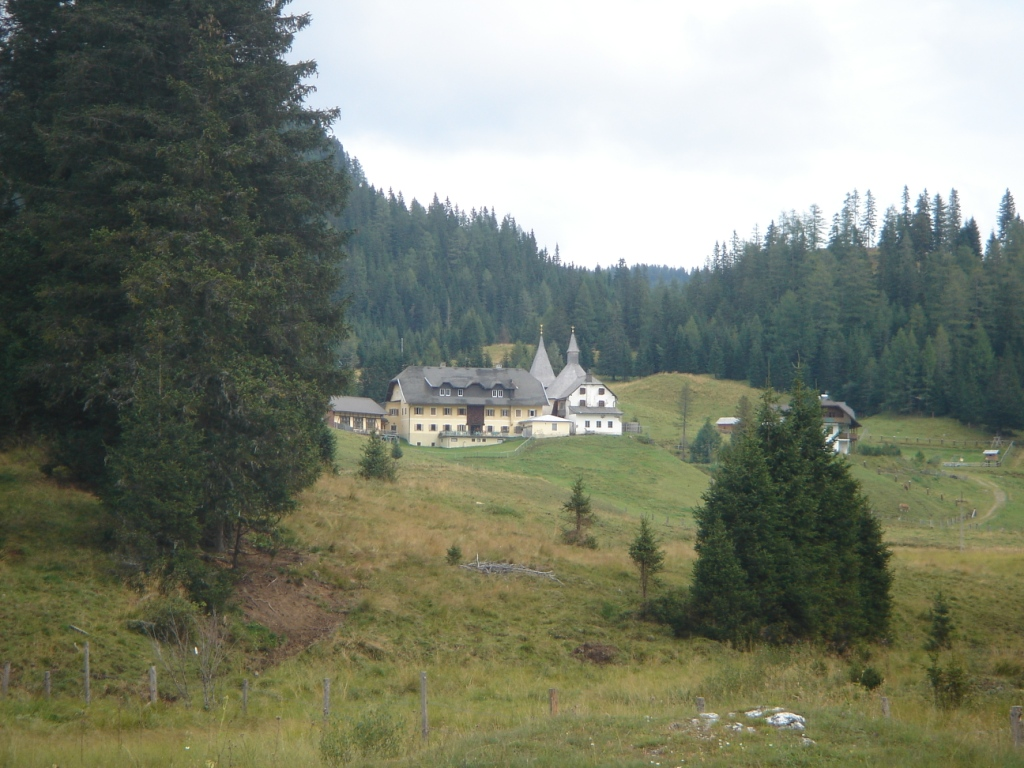
- Panoramic view, with St John's Church

- Location within Alps
- Elevation: 1,400 metres (4,600 ft)
- Traversed by: L 63

Third Approach
- Location: Carinthia, Austria
- Range: Gurktal Alps
- Coordinates: 46°56′31″N 14°2′7″E

Flattnitz Pass (el. 1,400 metres [4,593 ft]) is a high mountain pass in the Austrian Alps.

The pass is located in the state of Carinthia, connecting Glödnitz in the Gurk valley with Stadl on the Mur river, beyond the border with Styria. The pass height comprises a dispersed settlement with a high-altitude sanatorium (Luftkurort) and an Alpine lake (Flattnitzer See). It is a popular destination for hikers and for cross-country skiers in winter.

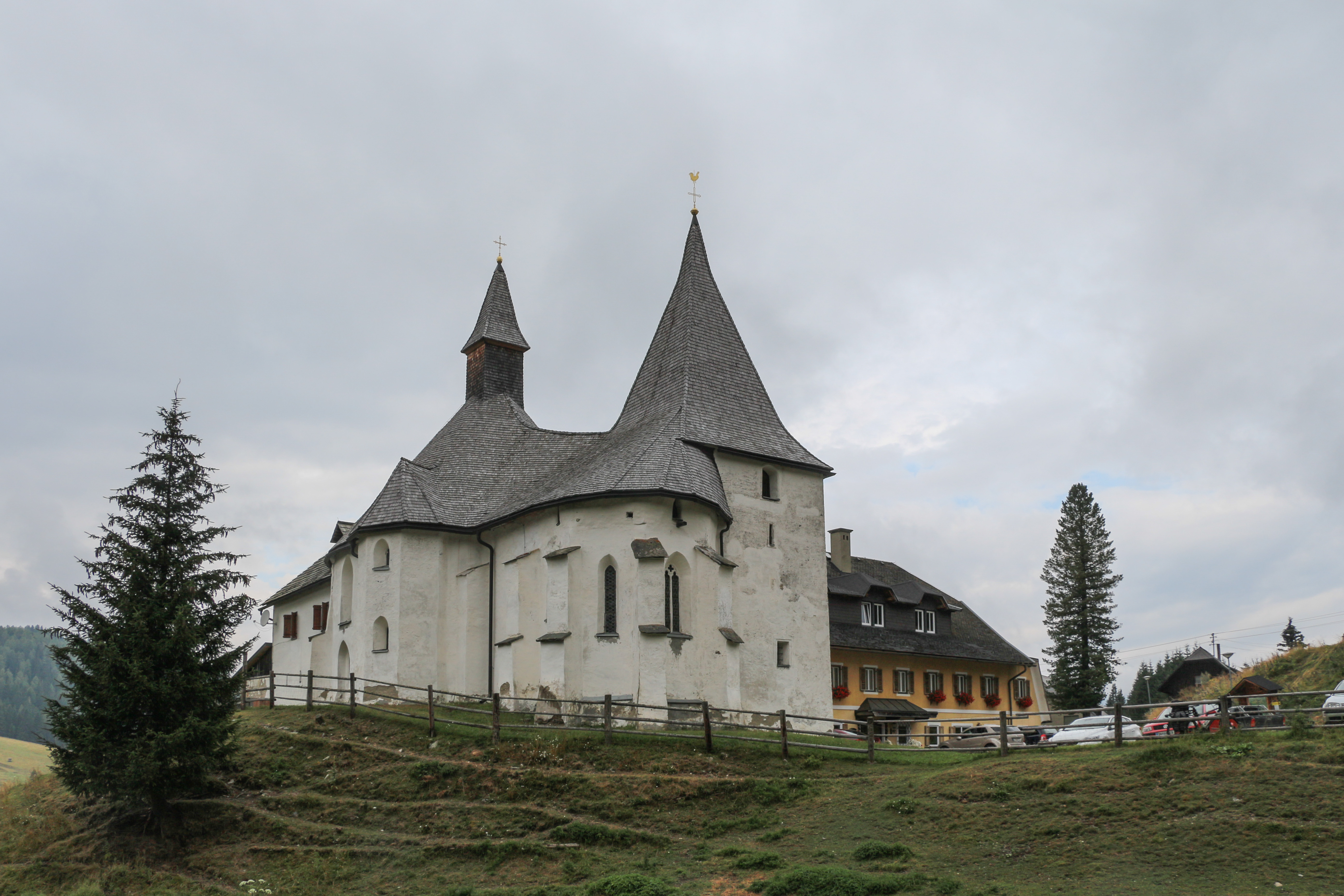
St John the Baptist

The pass was possibly known in Roman times, it was first mentioned in an 898 deed issued by the Carolingian emperor Arnulf. In 1173 the Gurk bishops had a Romanesque chapel erected, dedicated to St John the Baptist, which was rebuilt as a parish church with an adjacent hospice building about 1330. The bishops used Flattnitz (from Slovene: blato, "moss") as a summer residence. The pass height was devastated by invading Ottoman forces in 1478. In the 17th century, Flattnitz was a mining area for silver, iron ore, and lead.

== Climate ==
Flattnitz pass has a subarctic climate (Köppen Dfc) bordering on humid continental climate (Köppen Dfb).

Climate data for Flattnitz Pass: 1437m (1991−2020 normals)
| Month | Jan | Feb | Mar | Apr | May | Jun | Jul | Aug | Sep | Oct | Nov | Dec | Year |
|---|---|---|---|---|---|---|---|---|---|---|---|---|---|
| Record high °C (°F) | 12.9 (55.2) | 14.3 (57.7) | 17.5 (63.5) | 20.7 (69.3) | 25.0 (77.0) | 28.8 (83.8) | 27.7 (81.9) | 29.5 (85.1) | 24.6 (76.3) | 19.1 (66.4) | 16.6 (61.9) | 14.2 (57.6) | 29.5 (85.1) |
| Mean daily maximum °C (°F) | −0.2 (31.6) | 1.0 (33.8) | 4.0 (39.2) | 8.2 (46.8) | 12.7 (54.9) | 16.9 (62.4) | 17.6 (63.7) | 17.6 (63.7) | 13.4 (56.1) | 8.6 (47.5) | 3.8 (38.8) | 0.3 (32.5) | 8.7 (47.6) |
| Daily mean °C (°F) | −4.1 (24.6) | −3.2 (26.2) | −0.2 (31.6) | 3.4 (38.1) | 7.9 (46.2) | 11.7 (53.1) | 13.5 (56.3) | 13.1 (55.6) | 8.9 (48.0) | 4.8 (40.6) | 0.4 (32.7) | −3.3 (26.1) | 4.4 (39.9) |
| Mean daily minimum °C (°F) | −7.9 (17.8) | −8.1 (17.4) | −4.5 (23.9) | −1.3 (29.7) | 2.7 (36.9) | 6.5 (43.7) | 7.7 (45.9) | 7.8 (46.0) | 4.4 (39.9) | 0.7 (33.3) | −3.0 (26.6) | −6.8 (19.8) | −0.2 (31.7) |
| Record low °C (°F) | −22.6 (−8.7) | −25.4 (−13.7) | −22.4 (−8.3) | −14.2 (6.4) | −5.0 (23.0) | −1.8 (28.8) | −0.6 (30.9) | −3.0 (26.6) | −5.7 (21.7) | −17.1 (1.2) | −16.7 (1.9) | −22.0 (−7.6) | −25.4 (−13.7) |
| Average precipitation mm (inches) | 32.7 (1.29) | 35.8 (1.41) | 53.7 (2.11) | 78.4 (3.09) | 115.0 (4.53) | 151.6 (5.97) | 155.5 (6.12) | 171.2 (6.74) | 122.8 (4.83) | 112.7 (4.44) | 109.9 (4.33) | 56.0 (2.20) | 1,195.3 (47.06) |
| Average snowfall cm (inches) | 44 (17) | 58 (23) | 69 (27) | 40 (16) | 9 (3.5) | 0 (0) | 0 (0) | 0 (0) | 2 (0.8) | 14 (5.5) | 51 (20) | 65 (26) | 352 (138.8) |
Source: Central Institute for Meteorology and Geodynamics
