= Renato Ulrich =

Swiss freestyle skier (born 1983)

Personal information
- Born: 14 December 1983 (age 42) Lucerne, Switzerland

Sport
- Sport: Skiing

World Cup career
- Indiv. podiums: 5
- Updated on 28 March 2013

Renato Ulrich (born 14 December 1983 in Lucerne) is a Swiss freestyle skier, specializing in aerials.

Ulrich competed at the 2006 and 2010 Winter Olympics for Switzerland. In 2006, he advanced to the aerials final, finishing in 10th. In 2010, he placed 18th in the qualifying round of the aerials event, failing to advance to the final.

As of March 2013, his best showing at the World Championships is 4th, in both 2009 and 2011.

Ulrich made his World Cup debut in January 2003. As of March 2013, he has finished on the podium five times, with the best silver medals, in 2010/11 and 2011/12. His best World Cup overall finish in aerials is 3rd, in 2010/11.

== World Cup podiums ==
Date	Location	Rank	Event
1 February 2008	Deer Valley	3rd place, bronze medalist(s)	Aerials
30 January 2010	Mont Gabriel	3rd place, bronze medalist(s)	Aerials
19 December 2010	Beida Lake	3rd place, bronze medalist(s)	Aerials
29 January 2011	Calgary	2nd place, silver medalist(s)	Aerials
21 January 2012	Lake Placid	2nd place, silver medalist(s)	Aerials
