= Katrin Müller =

Swiss freestyle skier (born 1989)

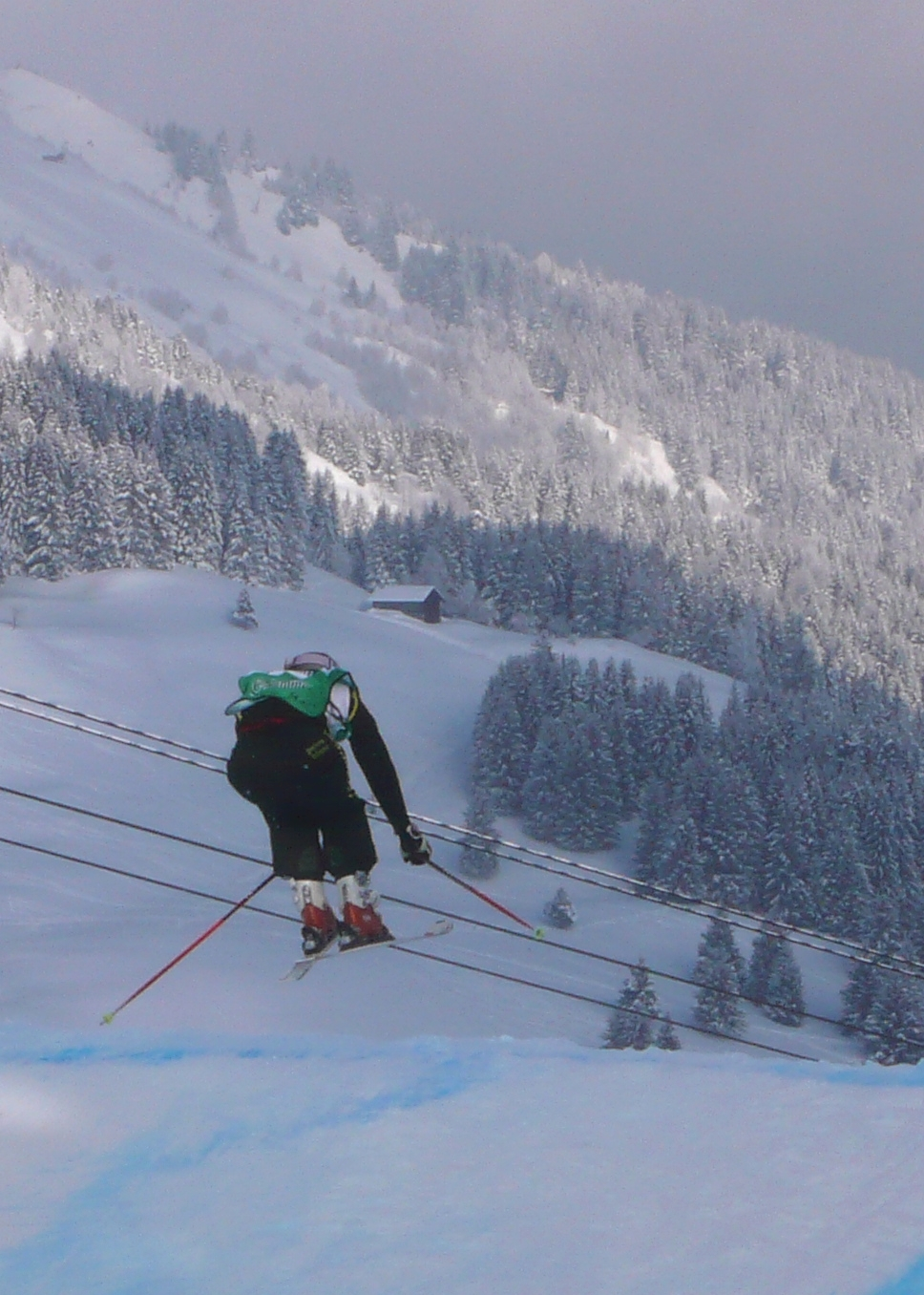

Personal information
- Born: March 31, 1989 (age 37) Dielsdorf, Switzerland

Sport
- Sport: Skiing

World Cup career
- Indiv. podiums: 12
- Indiv. wins: 3
- Updated on January 21, 2014

Katrin Müller (born March 31, 1989) is a Swiss freestyle skier, specializing in ski cross.

Müller competed at the 2010 Winter Olympics for Switzerland. She placed 9th in the qualifying round in ski cross, to advance to the knockout stages. She failed to finish her first round heat, and did not advance.

As of April 2013, her best finish at the World Championships is 14th, in 2011.

Müller made her World Cup debut in January 2008. As of April 2013, she has one World Cup victory, coming at Bischofswiesen in 2011/12. Her best World Cup overall finish in ski cross is 3rd, in 2011/12.

== World Cup podiums ==
Date	Location	Rank	Event
29 January 2011	Grasgehren	3rd place, bronze medalist(s)	Ski cross
6 March 2011	Meiringen-Hasliberg	2nd place, silver medalist(s)	Ski cross
19 March 2011	Voss	3rd place, bronze medalist(s)	Ski cross
18 December 2011	Innichen	3rd place, bronze medalist(s)	Ski cross
15 January 2012	Les Contamines	3rd place, bronze medalist(s)	Ski cross
3 February 2012	Blue Mountain	3rd place, bronze medalist(s)	Ski cross
26 February 2012	Bischofswiesen	1st place, gold medalist(s)	Ski cross
23 December 2012	Innichen	3rd place, bronze medalist(s)	Ski cross
17 March 2013	Are	3rd place, bronze medalist(s)	Ski cross
15 December 2013	Val Thorens	1st place, gold medalist(s)	Ski cross
22 December 2013	Innichen	1st place, gold medalist(s)	Ski cross
17 January 2014	Val Thorens	2nd place, silver medalist(s)	Ski cross
