= Stadl-Predlitz =

- Municipality
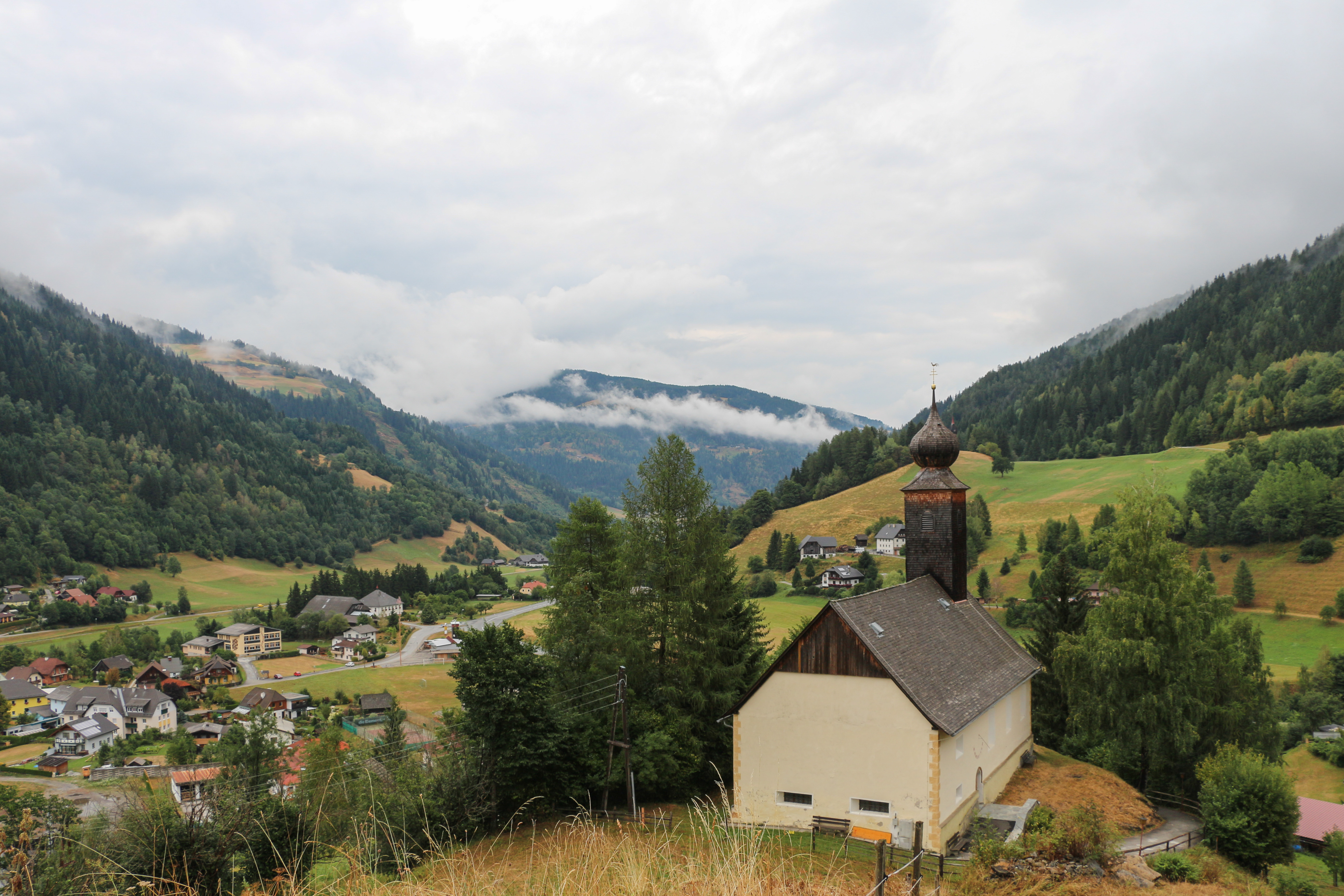
- Parish church in Predlitz

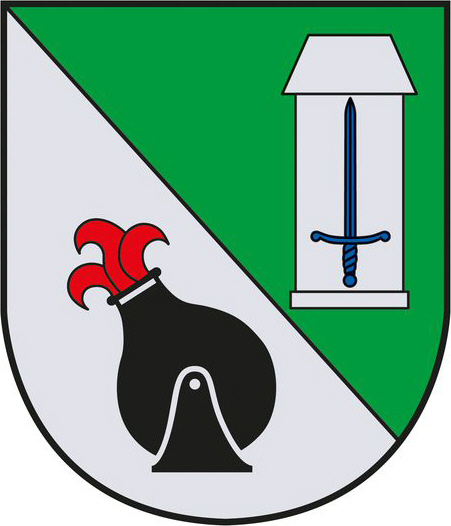
- Coat of arms

- Location within Austria
- Coordinates: 47°05′00″N 13°58′00″E
- Country: Austria
- State: Styria
- District: Murau

Government
  - Mayor: Wolfgang Schlick (SPÖ)

Area
  - Total: 256.94 km^{2} (99.21 sq mi)
- Elevation: 914 m (2,999 ft)

Population (2018-01-01)
  - Total: 1,684
  - Density: 6.554/km^{2} (16.97/sq mi)
- Time zone: UTC+1 (CET)
  - Summer (DST): UTC+2 (CEST)
- Postal code: 8862, 8863, 8864
- Area code: 03534
- Website: www.stadl-predlitz.gv.at

Stadl-Predlitz is a municipality in the Murau District of Styria, Austria. It was created as part of the Styria municipal structural reform, at the end of 2014, by merging the former towns Stadl an der Mur and Predlitz-Turrach.

== Geography ==
=== Municipality arrangement ===
The municipality territory includes the following seven sections (populations as of January 2015):

- Einach (235)
- Paal (127)
- Predlitz (380)
- Sonnberg (81)
- Stadl an der Mur (448)
- Steindorf (297)
- Turrach (150)

The municipality consists of three Katastralgemeinden (areas 2015):

- Einach (2,328.33 ha or 5,753.4 acres)
- Predlitz (12,657.36 ha or 31,277.0 acres)
- Stadl (10,633.40 ha or 26,275.7 acres)

=== Neighboring municipalities ===
The municipality borders on one Styrian, three Salzburger, and six Kärntner municipalities (TA = Tamsweg District, SV = Sankt Veit an der Glan District, FE = Feldkirchen District, SP = Spittal an der Drau District).

=== Incorporations ===
- In 1969 the independent municipalities Einach and Predlitz were joined into municipality Predlitz-Turrach.
- In 2015 the municipalities Stadl an der Mur and Predlitz-Turrach were joined into new municipality Stadl-Predlitz.

== Culture and sights ==
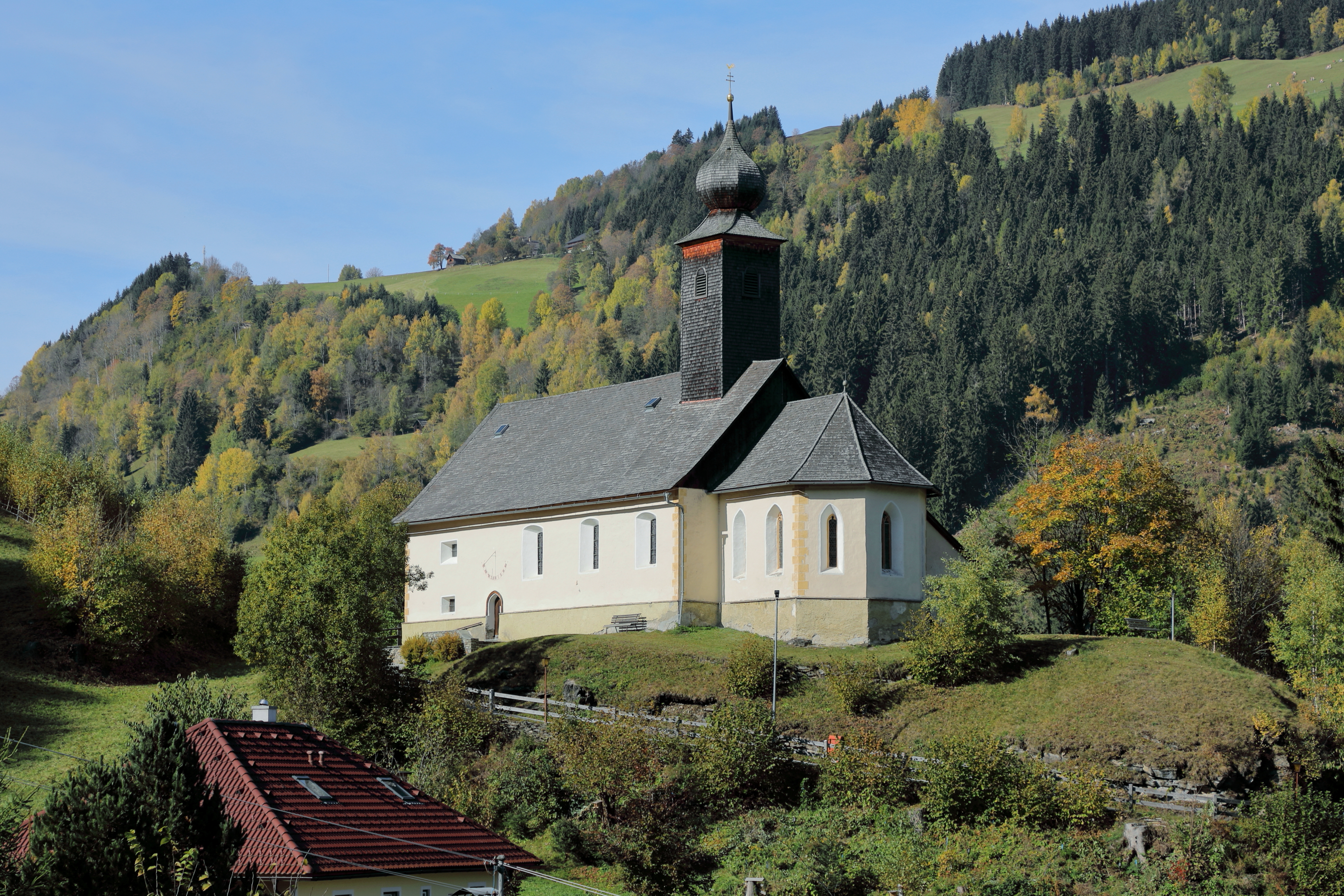
Parish church in Predlitz

- Saints Primus and Felician church in Predlitz. A Romanesque church that was expanded to the west in 1707/1709 and whose choir was built around 1452.

== Politics ==
=== Municipal council ===
The prior elections brought the following results:

Partei	2015 Stadl-Predlitz			2010 Stadl an der Mur and Predlitz-Turrach		
Partei	Votes	%	Mandate	Votes	%	Mandate
SPÖ	507	39,73 %	6	578	42,38 %	9 + 2
ÖVP	429	33,62 %	5	504	36,95 %	5 + 4
FPÖ	340	26,65 %	4	282	20,67 %	1 + 3
Wahlbeteiligung	85.2%					

The ÖVP held with Johannes Rauter as mayor.

=== Wappen ===
Crests of former towns

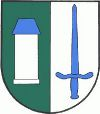
Stadl an der Mur

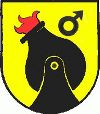
Predlitz-Turrach

The granting of the town crest came into effect on 10 January 2016.
The blazon (crest description) reads:

"In a diagonal-split shield, at lower left on silver a black wheeled Bessemerburner with three red flames, at upper right on green a silver capped window Salzstadl with a blue Schwert."

== Notable people ==
- Erich Moser (born 1948), former mayor of Stadl an der Mur and Bundesrat
