= Sanna Lüdi =

Swiss freestyle skier (born 1986)

Personal information
- Born: February 17, 1986 (age 40) Baden, Switzerland

Sport
- Sport: Skiing

World Cup career
- Indiv. podiums: 6
- Indiv. wins: 2
- Updated on July 31, 2013

Sanna Lüdi or Luedi (born February 17, 1986) is a former Swiss freestyle skier, specializing in ski cross.

== Career ==
Lüdi competed at the 2010 Winter Olympics for Switzerland. She placed 35th in the qualifying round in ski cross, and did not advance to the knockout rounds.

As of April 2013, her only finish at the World Championships is 9th, in 2009.

Lüdi made her World Cup debut in January 2009. As of April 2013, she has two World Cup victories, the first coming at Alpe d'Huez in 2011/12. Her best World Cup overall finish in ski cross is 4th, in 2011/12.

== Anti-doping rule violation ==
In 2015 Lüdi was banned from sport for one year after three whereabout failures in 18 months.

== World Cup podiums ==
Date	Location	Rank	Event
12 March 2009	Grindelwald	3rd place, bronze medalist(s)	Ski cross
22 December 2009	Innichen	3rd place, bronze medalist(s)	Ski cross
17 December 2011	Innichen	2nd place, silver medalist(s)	Ski cross
18 December 2011	Innichen	2nd place, silver medalist(s)	Ski cross
11 January 2012	Alpe d'Huez	1st place, gold medalist(s)	Ski cross
15 January 2012	Les Contamines	1st place, gold medalist(s)	Ski cross
