= Maria Komissarova =

Russian athlete (born 1990)

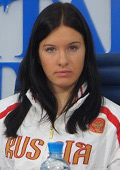

Personal information
- Born: September 5, 1990 (age 36) Leningrad, Soviet Union
- Height: 1.77 m (5 ft 9 1/2 in)
- Weight: 71 kg (157 lb; 11.2 st)
- Life partner: Alexei Chaadaev

Sport
- Country: Russia
- Sport: Freestyle skiing
- Coached by: Vladimir Baryshnikov; Mario Reyfettseder
- Updated on 16 February 2014

Maria Leonidovna Komissarova (Russian: Мария Леонидовна Комиссарова; born September 5, 1990) is a Russian athlete who competes in freestyle skiing. She was due to compete at the 2014 Winter Olympics, but during a training run before her event, she fractured a vertebra with a dislocation of her spine, rendering her unable to compete.

== Career ==
Komissarova was born on 5 September 1990, in Leningrad, Soviet Union (today St. Petersburg).

At the 2012 World Cup in Grindelwald, Switzerland, Maria Komissarova became the first-ever Russian woman to win a medal in the World Cup in ski cross, placing second. She has been described as the "face of Russian freestyle skiing".

In 2013, surgery on a leg injury meant that Komissarova was unable to compete for six months.

Komissarova was due to compete at the 2014 Winter Olympics in Sochi. However, while training at the Rosa Khutor Extreme Park on the ski cross course on 15 February 2014, she suffered a spinal cord injury with a fracture and dislocation of the twelfth thoracic vertebra. Komissarova was rushed into surgery which lasted six and a half hours. The Russian Federation, for which she was competing, said, "Doctors carried out the necessary examination and took the decision to operate on her on the spot". Thomas Bach, president of the International Olympic Committee, said, "We hope that the operation will be successful and that she will be back". She was due to compete on the 21 February 2014, but it was announced after the accident that she would not be competing. Hers was the first serious injury of the 2014 Olympic Games.

On the same day Komissarova was admitted to hospital, on the evening of 15 February 2014, Vladimir Putin visited the skier and spoke to her father.

On 16 February 2014, the day after the incident, Komissarova was moved to a Munich hospital where she underwent further surgery on 17 February. Komissarova said in an Instagram update at the end of February that she was paralyzed from the waist and down. The Russian Freestyle Federation has called for donations to cover her medical costs. She hopes to recover, saying "some day I will definitely be on my feet again". However, on 5 March, the opinion of her doctors was published stating she would never fully recover. £400,000 has been raised for her treatment.
