= Dylan Ferguson (skier) =

American freestyle skier

Dylan Ferguson (born August 10, 1988) is an American freestyle skier who has competed since 2004. His best World Cup finish was second in an aerials event at Deer Valley, Utah in January 2012.

Ferguson's best finish at the FIS Freestyle World Ski Championships was seventh in the aerials event at Inawashiro in 2009.

He was named to the US team for the 2010 Winter Olympics in January 2010. However, he began experiencing stomach pains in early February while training at Park City, Utah before the games. Two days later he was rushed to a Park City hospital for an emergency appendectomy, and later developed an infection, a complication from the surgery. As a result, Ferguson was forced to withdraw from the Olympic Games; he was replaced on the US team by Scotty Bahrke.
