= Glödnitz =

- Municipality
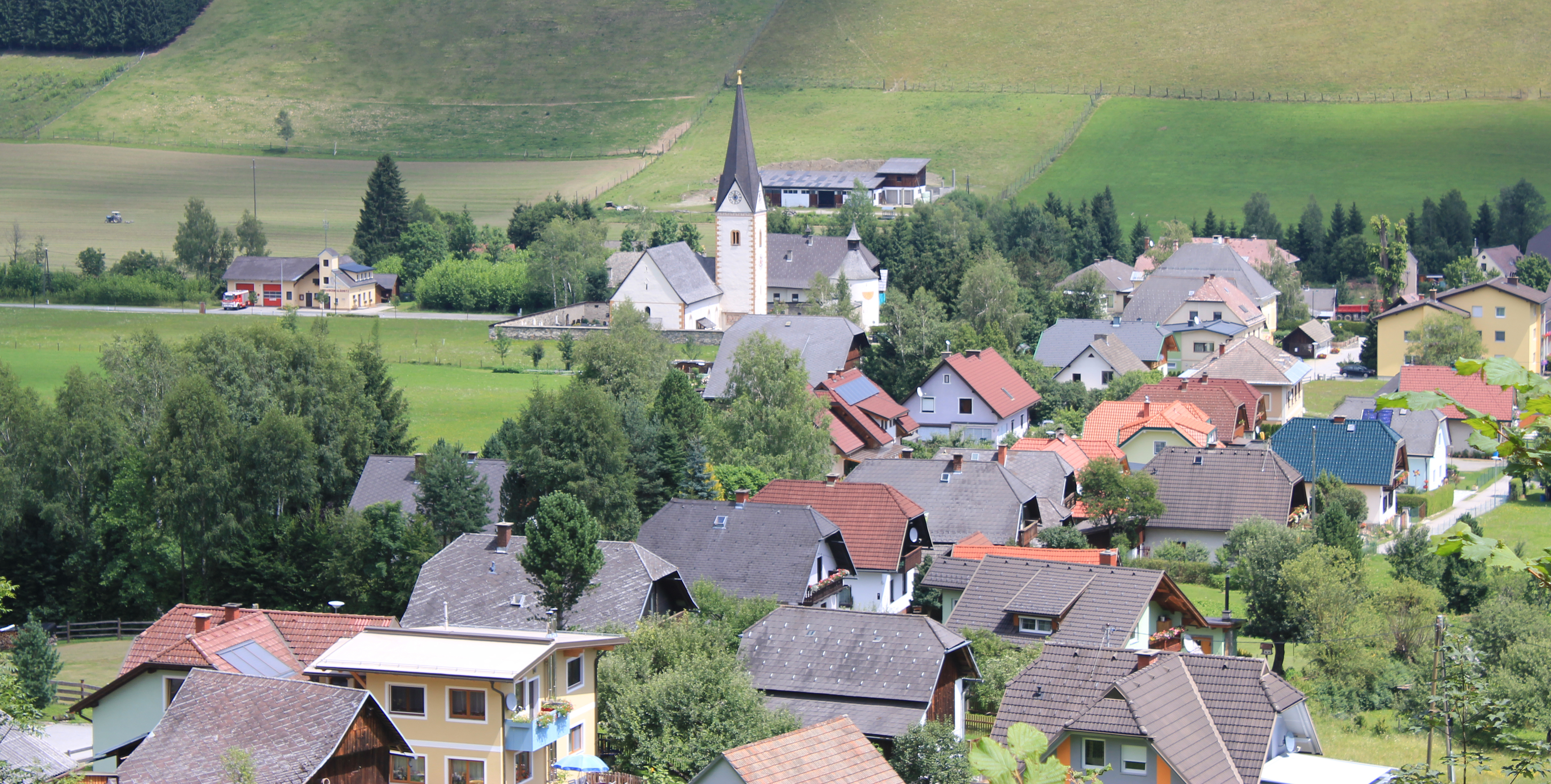

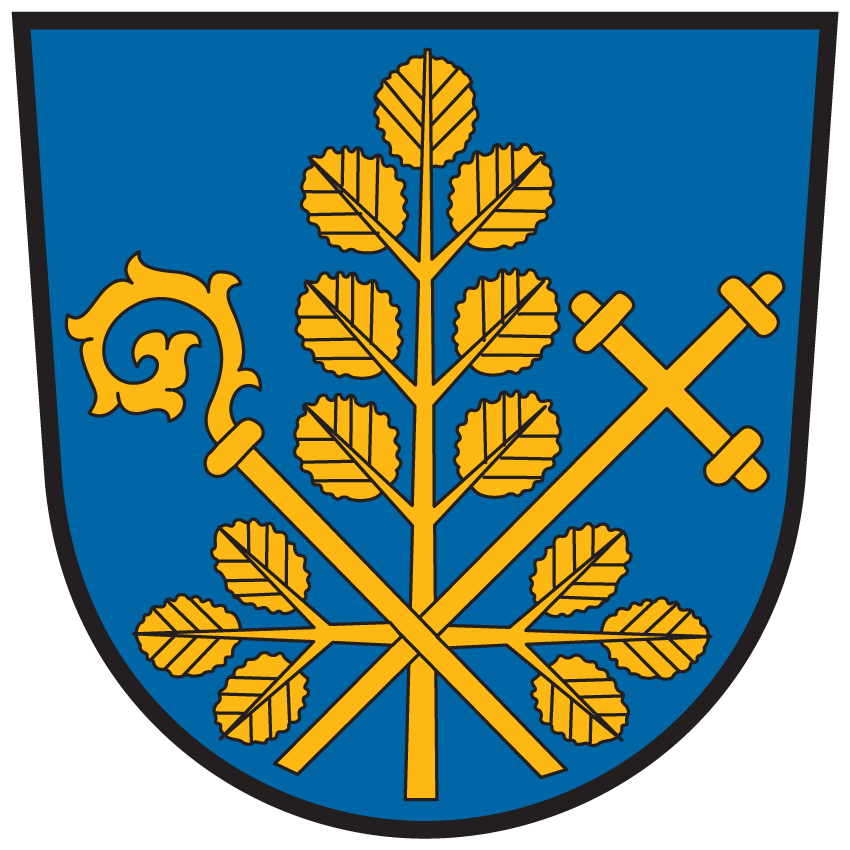
- Coat of arms

- Location within Austria
- Coordinates: 46°52′N 14°7′E
- Country: Austria
- State: Carinthia
- District: Sankt Veit an der Glan

Government
  - Mayor: Johann Fugger (ÖVP)

Area
  - Total: 74.65 km^{2} (28.82 sq mi)
- Elevation: 748 m (2,454 ft)

Population (2018-01-01)
  - Total: 807
  - Density: 10.8/km^{2} (28.0/sq mi)
- Time zone: UTC+1 (CET)
  - Summer (DST): UTC+2 (CEST)
- Postal code: 9346
- Area code: 04265

Glödnitz (Slovene: Glodnica) is a municipality in the district of Sankt Veit an der Glan in the Austrian state of Carinthia.

== Geography ==
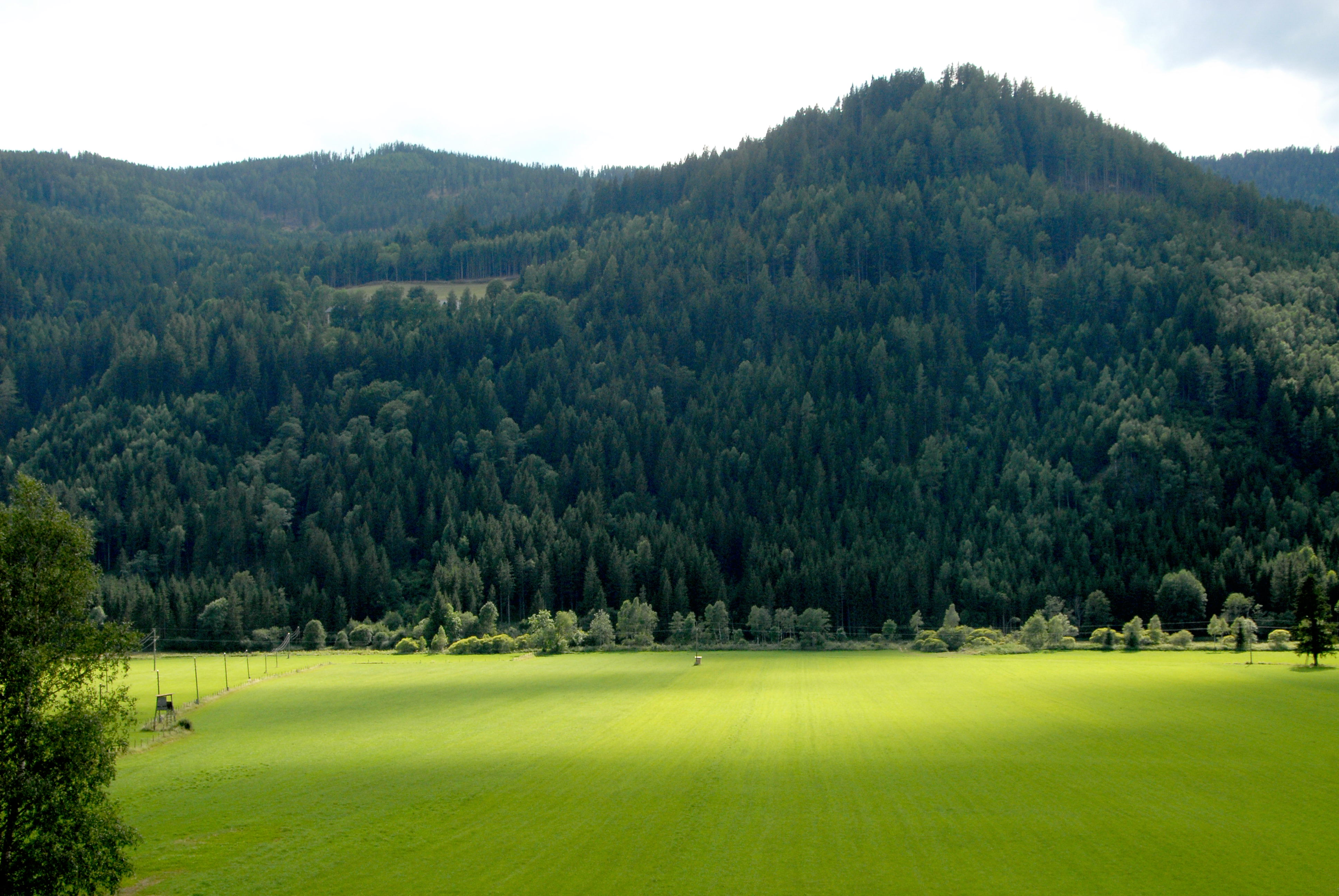
Glödnitz valley

The municipal area stretches along the densely forested valley of the Glödnitz river, a tributary of the Gurk, in the northwestern Gurktal Alps. The Flattnitz Pass in the north leads to the Mur valley in Styria; Glödnitz also borders on the Carinthian municipalities of Metnitz, Weitensfeld im Gurktal, Deutsch-Griffen, and Albeck.

== History ==
A Roman road across Flattnitz Pass already existed in ancient times, possibly including a mansio in the Glödnitz area. The settlement of Glodati was first named in an 898 deed. A chapel donated by Saint Hemma of Gurk was mentioned in 1043, it was later rebuilt as the present-day St Maragaret parish church. In medieval times, large estates in the area were held by the Bishops of Gurk, who also had a filial church erected near Flattnitz Pass.

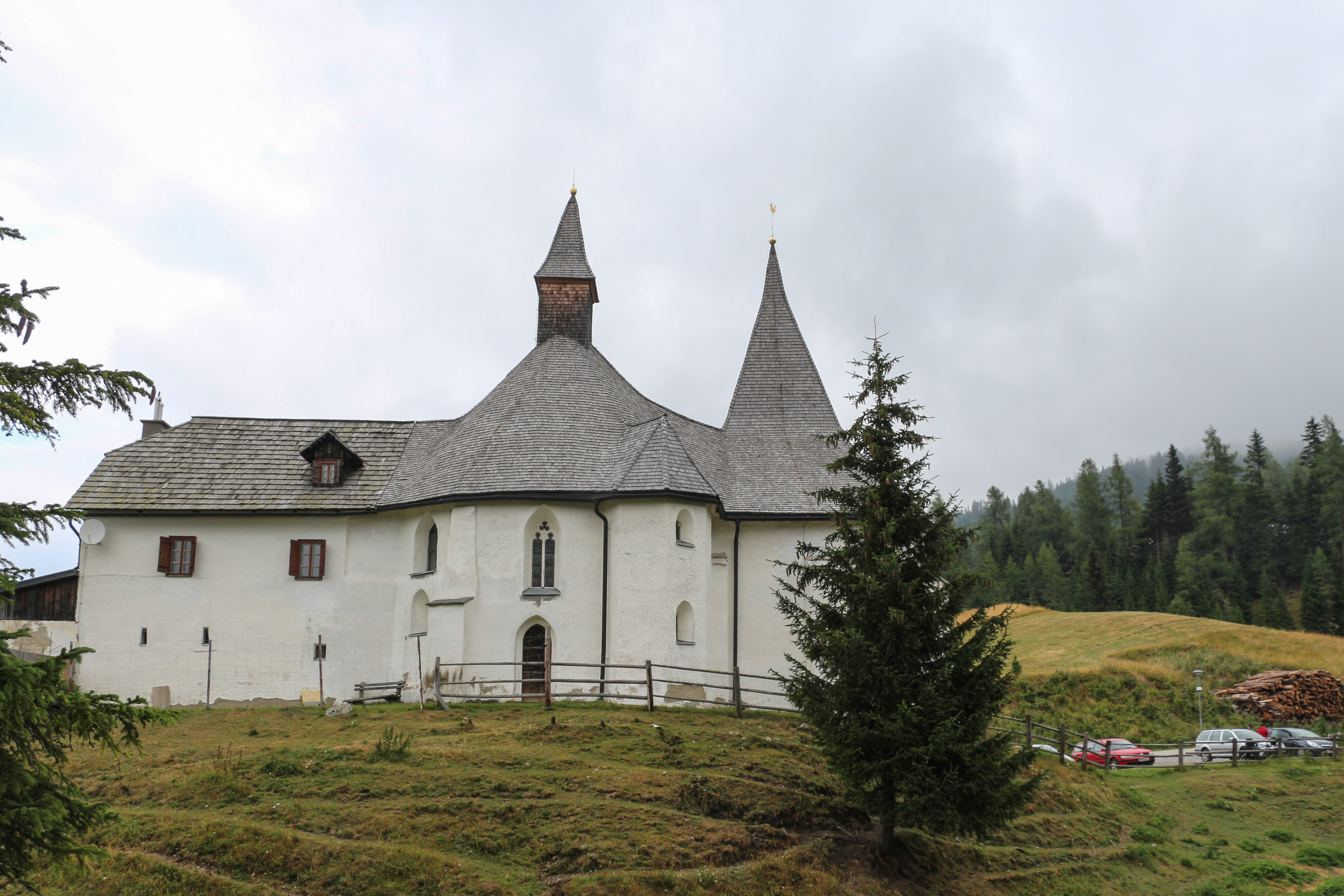
The medieval church on the Flattnitzer Höhe.

The Glödnitz municipality was established in 1850. Since the 1920s the former agricultural area is increasingly shaped by tourism, especially in winter.

== Politics ==
Seats in the municipal assembly (Gemeinderat) as of 2015 local elections:

- Austrian People's Party (ÖVP): 6
- Freedom Party of Austria (FPÖ): 3
- Social Democratic Party of Austria (SPÖ): 2
