= David DiGravio =

David DiGravio (born November 26, 1986) is an athlete on the U.S. Ski Team; he competes in the freestyle skiing events of Moguls and Dual Moguls.

== Early years ==
DiGravio was born in Weymouth, Massachusetts, and he attended Carrabassett Valley Academy in Carrabassett, Maine; later he enrolled in Westminster College in Utah.

== United States Ski Team ==
DiGravio's first victories in the Nor-Am Cup and the Europa Cup were in 2005; on January 28, 2005, he won the Dual Moguls event in the Europa Cup in S. Martino Di Castrozza, Italy, and he followed that with a victory in Dual Moguls at the Nor-Am in Killington Ski Resort, Vermont, on February 13, 2005.

He placed 23rd in Moguls in his first World Cup, which took place in Deer Valley, Utah, on January 13, 2006, a World Cup won by DiGravio's teammate on the U.S. Ski Team, Toby Dawson. In DiGravio's second World Cup, he broke into the top-10, placing 6th in Moguls at the World Cup in Lake Placid, New York, on January 20, 2006. His rookie year on the World Cup (2006) also included the only World Cup podium of his career as of 2012; he placed 3rd in Moguls in the World Cup that took place on March 1, 2006 in Jisan Forest, South Korea, just behind the winner and then freshly-crowned Olympic Champion Dale Begg-Smith and behind the second-place finisher Guilbaut Colas from France (it was the first World Cup podium for Colas as well). DiGravio almost didn't even qualify for his second and final run at that World Cup. Only sixteen skiers advance, and he qualified in fourteenth. But his second run was good enough for bronze.

He placed 9th in Moguls in the World Ski Championships in Deer Valley, Utah, in 2011, and 11th in Moguls and 13th in Dual Moguls in the World Ski Championships in Madonna di Campiglio, Italy, in 2007.

DiGravio has seven podiums on the Nor-Am Cup, including one victory in Dual Moguls. And his best world ranking between 2006 and 2012 was a ranking of 10th in Moguls in 2011.

DiGravio's aerial maneuvers, which are some of the most technically difficult tricks performed in World Cup Moguls, include an off-axis (somewhat inverted) 1080, and a back double-full (a back flip with two twists).
