= Emilia Wint =

American alpine skier (born 1994)

Personal information
- Nationality: American
- Born: June 21, 1994 (age 32) Denver, Colorado, U.S.
- Education: Utah State University

Sport
- Sport: Skier
- Club: Team Breckenridge Sports Club
- Team: U.S. Freeskiing
- Turned pro: 2012
- Updated on 2 October 2014

Emilia Wint is an American professional skier from Denver, CO. They joined the U.S. Ski Team in 2012 as part of the slopestyle ski team. Emilia dealt with a severe knee injury in 2012 which they reinjured in soon thereafter in 2013, ultimately not allowing them to make the U.S. Olympic team in Sochi. Emilia uses they/them pronouns.
