= Sho Kashima =

American freestyle skier (born 1986)

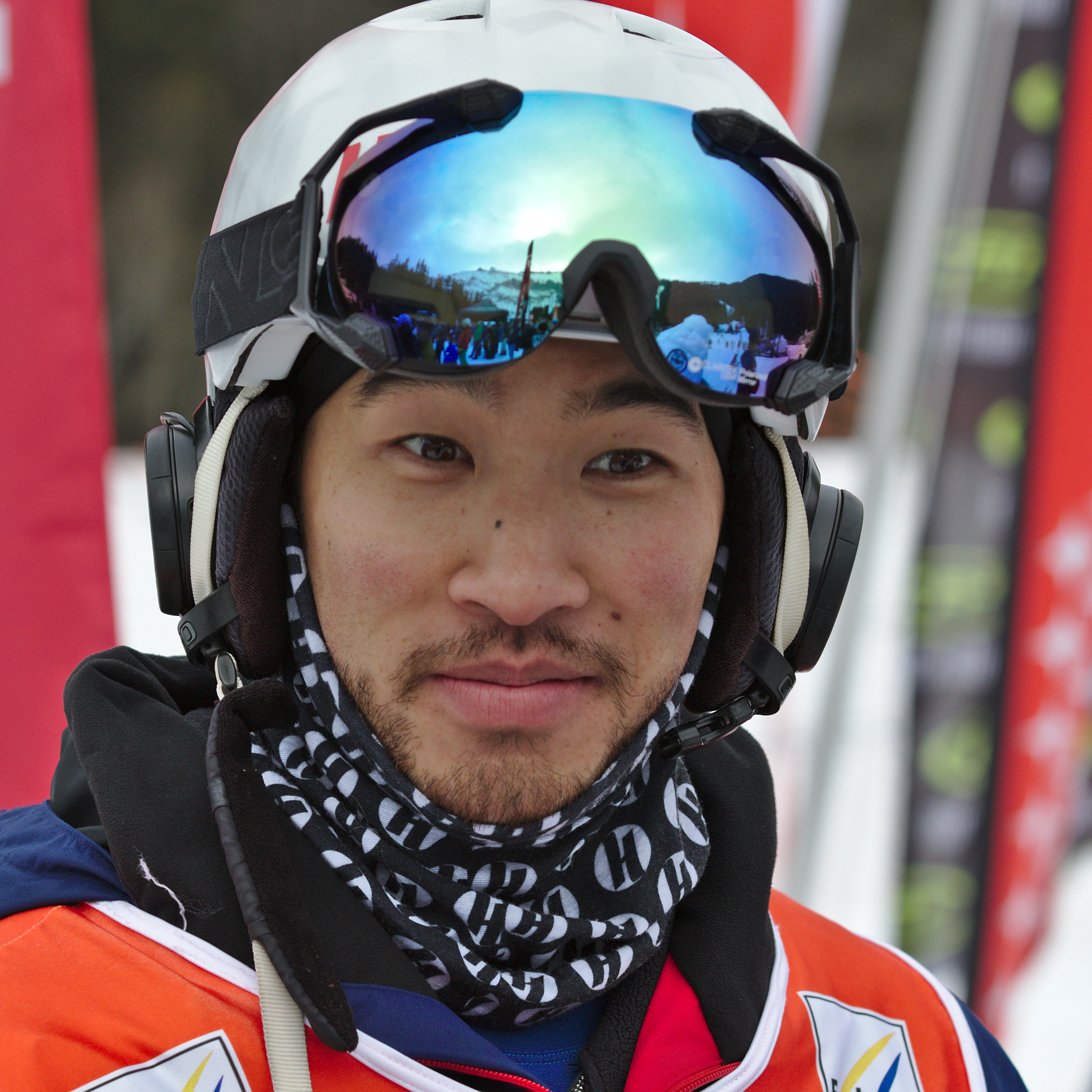

Personal information
- Born: Sho William Kashima; November 1, 1986 (age 38); El Paso, Texas
- Height: 1.70 m (5 ft 7 in)
- Weight: 70 kg (150 lb; 11 st)

Sport
- Country: United States
- Sport: Freestyle skiing

Sho William Kashima (born November 1, 1986) is an American freestyle skier from El Paso, Texas. Sho currently resides in Park City, Utah. Sho was considered a threat to qualify for the U.S. Olympic team in Vancouver, but missed the 2010 Games after suffering a knee injury in January of that year, ending his season.

== Early career ==
Sho began skiing when he was 4yrs old, after his father was hired at Heavenly Mountain Resort in Lake Tahoe, Calif. Growing up, Kashima idolized 1998 Olympic moguls champion Jonny Moseley, and it was Moseley's gold in Nagano that inspired him to compete in the Olympics. He also looked up to U.S. moguls skiers Travis Cabral (ninth in at the 2006 Torino Games), Travis Ramos and Chris Hernandez, all of whom have roots in Lake Tahoe. Sho was 12 years old when he first started skiing moguls with the Heavenly Team, and continued skiing with them till the age of 19 when he qualified for, and joined, the US Ski Team. Sho won his first major title, a Junior Olympics title, in Moguls when he was 17 at a competition in Silver Mountain, Idaho.

== US Ski Team ==
Sho made the US Ski Team by winning the 2006 National Championships for Dual Moguls in Killington, Vermont. His rookie year on the US Team (2006–2007) was very successful, finishing the season ranked 13th in the World and runner up for World Cup Rookie of the year. A minor ankle injury affected his skiing in 2007-2008 and he decided to take the 2nd half of the season off. In 2008-2009, he finished the season ranked 8th in the World and had a 6th-place finish at World Championships for moguls as well as a 10th-place finish in Dual Moguls. He's also won 3 National Championships in Dual Moguls (2006, 2007, 2009).

== Results ==
Sho Kashima's 2009 ski season competition results and history.

Sho Kashima's Competition History.
