= K. C. Oakley =

American freestyle skier

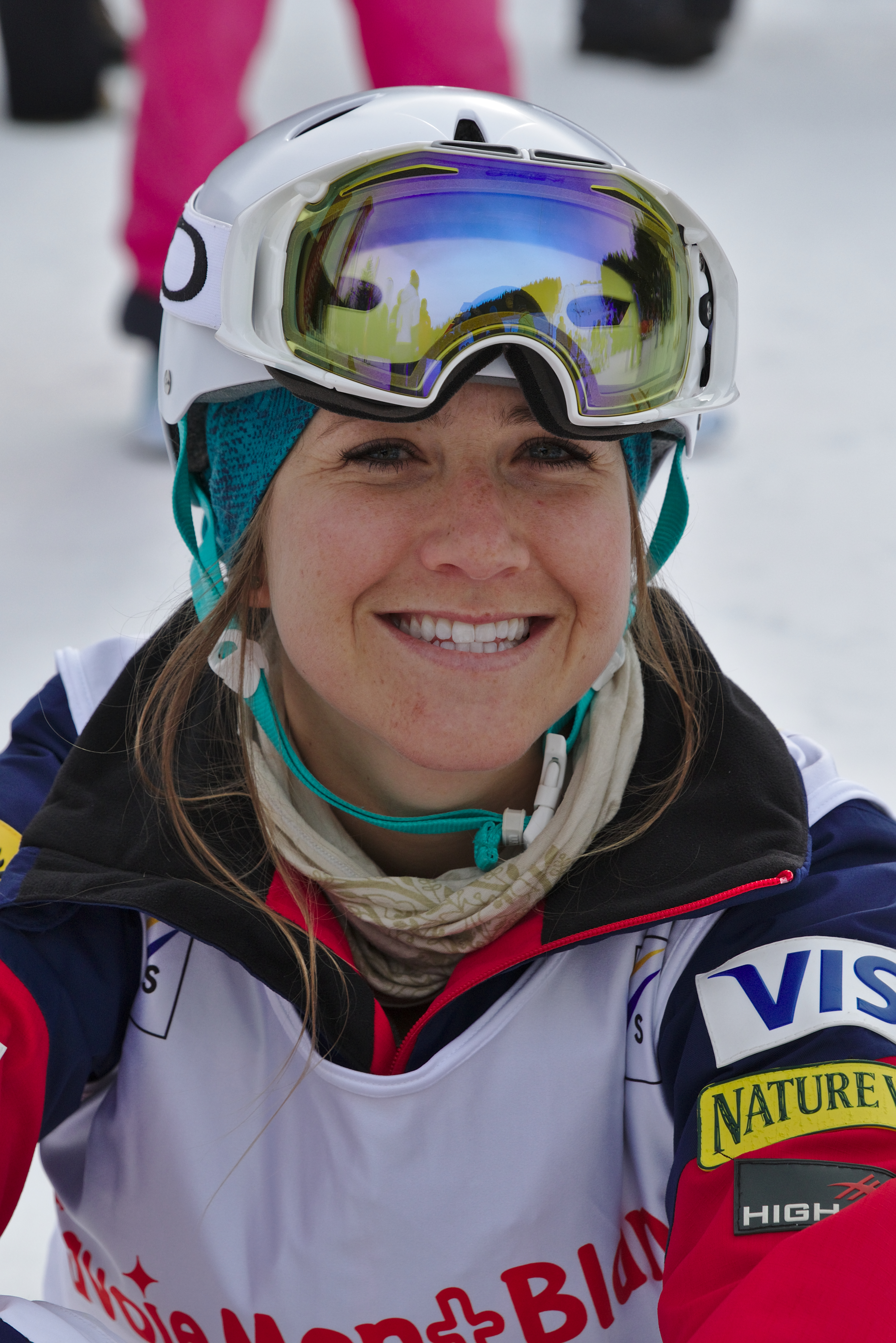
- Born: May 5, 1988 (age 38); Hollywood, California
- Education: Master of Business Administration Bachelor of Arts, Psychology
- Alma mater: University of California, Berkeley
- Occupation: Professional freestyle skier (moguls)
- Years active: 6
- Organization: U.S. Freestyle Ski Team
- Height: 5 ft 8 in (173 cm)

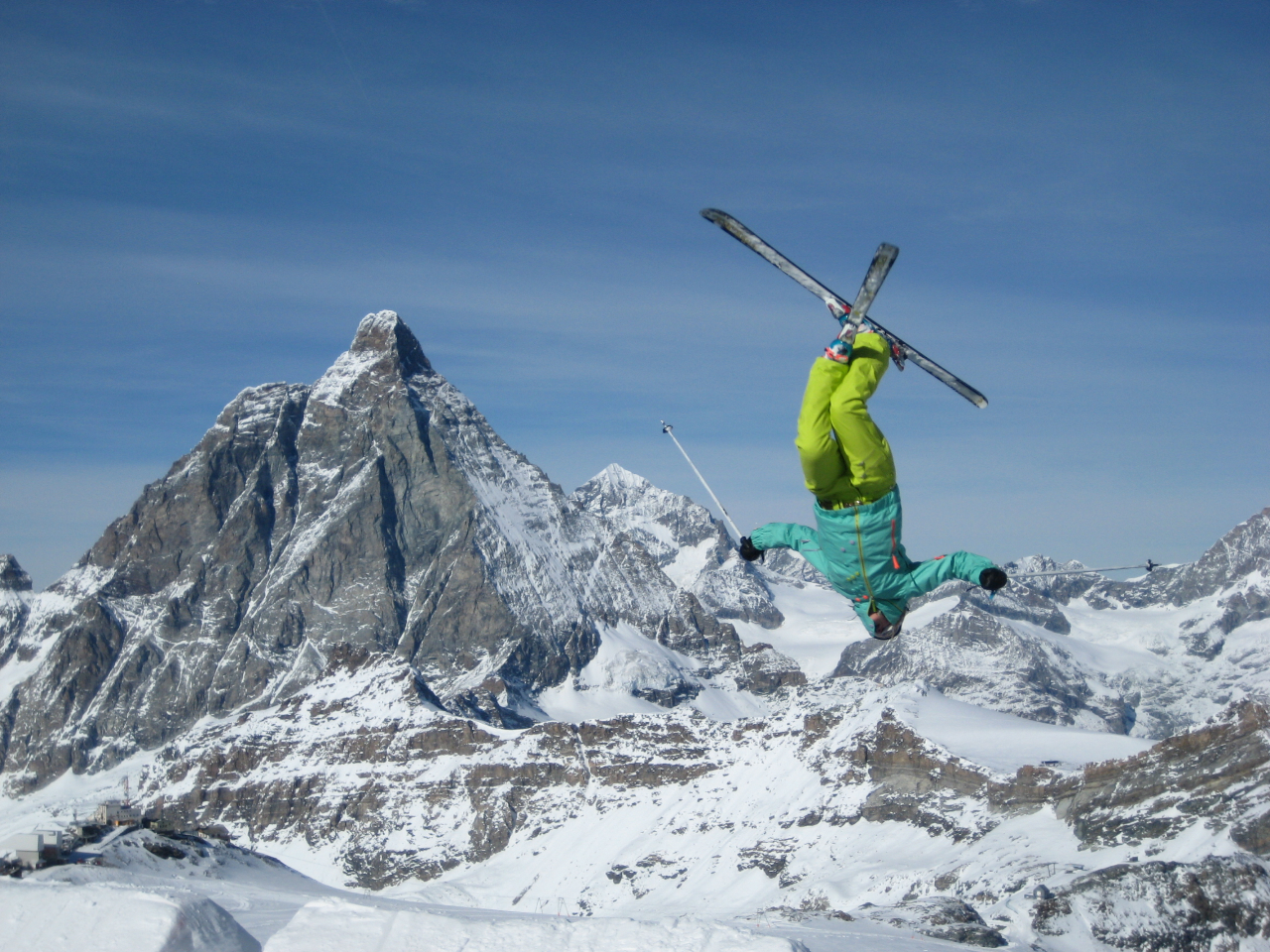
Training in Zermatt, Switzerland, Matterhorn in background

K. C. Oakley (born May 5, 1988) is an American freestyle mogul skier and a member of the United States Ski Team. She started competing on the World Cup circuit in the 2011-2012 ski season after finishing first in the NorAm Cup standings at the completion of the 2011 season.

== Early years ==
Oakley began skiing at the age of 13 for the Alpine Meadows Freestyle Team, founded by her cousin, Clay Beck. She became a "weekend warrior" making the three-hour drive from the San Francisco Bay Area to Lake Tahoe every weekend for training. She competed in freeskiing and moguls at first, but at the age of 17 turned her focus to competing exclusively in moguls skiing.

== Professional career ==
In addition to winning the 2011 North American Grand Prix Cup, Oakley won the silver medal at the 2011 U.S. National Championships at Stratton Mountain Resort, capping off the most successful season in her young career.

In the 2011-2012 FIS World Cup season, she finished with seven top-ten results, qualified for all the finals, finished ninth overall in the rankings, got her first World Cup podium with a third-place finish in Calgary, and was named World Cup Rookie of the Year. She finished the season at U.S. National Championships in Stratton, Vermont, where she placed third in single moguls and won the dual moguls' competition, making her the U.S. National Dual Moguls Champion.

In 2013, Oakley continued to make every World Cup final and added six more top-ten results to her accomplishments. After dealing with exertional compartment syndrome in her lower legs for the previous two seasons, she decided to undergo surgery.

Oakley missed the 2014 Winter Olympic Games in Sochi, Russia, due to nerve injury in her lower legs, but won the 2015 FIS Freestyle World Cup in Deer Valley, Utah. Going into the 2015-2016 ski season, which began in Ruka, Finland on December 12, Oakley was ranked ninth in the FIS World Cup and was the top ranked U.S. female moguls skier. In January 2016 it was reported that she would miss most of the season due to a back injury.

== College ==
In between training and competing, Oakley attended University of California, Berkeley, where after 3.5 years, she graduated with a Bachelor of Arts in psychology with an emphasis in Business Communications. At Westminster College (Utah) in 2013, Oakley began working towards her MBA, which she was awarded in July 2015. At the time, she was the only U.S. Ski Team athlete to complete a master's degree while a full-time competitor.

Oakley was a member of Kappa Kappa Gamma sorority where she was roommates with lung cancer victim and coxswain for the UC Berkeley's women's crew team, Jill Costello, who died June 24, 2010. Oakley was a co-founder of Jill's Legacy, an advisory board of young people formed shortly after Costello's death.
