= Anna Wörner =

German freestyle skier

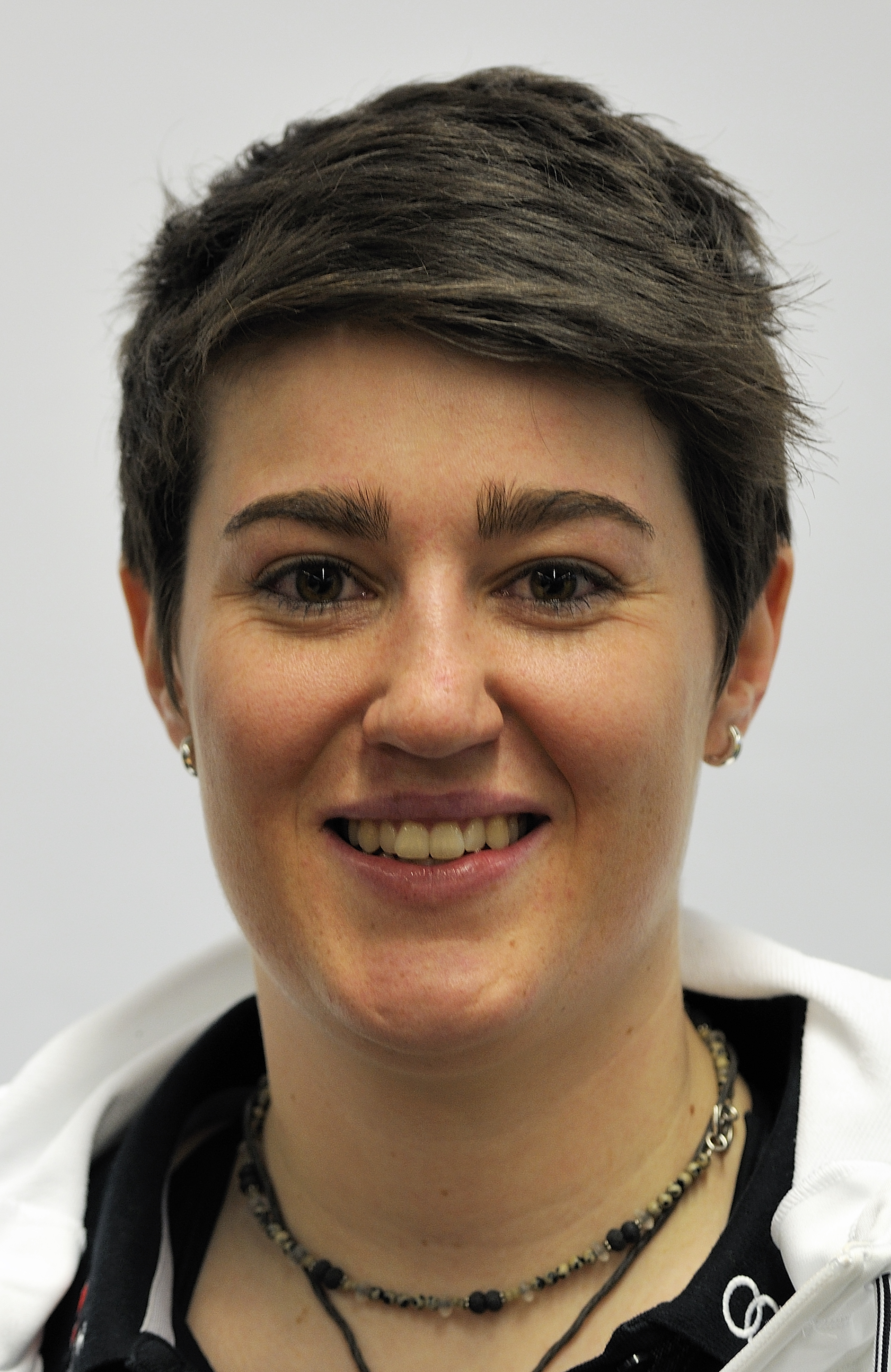

Personal information
- Nationality: Germany
- Born: 27 September 1989 (age 36) Garmisch-Partenkirchen, West Germany

Sport
- Sport: Skiing
- Club: SC Partenkirchen

World Cup career
- Seasons: 10 – (2008–2017)
- Indiv. starts: 61
- Indiv. podiums: 5
- Indiv. wins: 3
- Overall titles: 0 – (21st in 2011)
- Discipline titles: 0

Anna Wörner (also spelled Woerner; born 27 September 1989) is a German freestyle skier, specializing in ski cross.

Wörner competed at the 2010 Winter Olympics for Germany. She placed 7th in the qualifying round in ski cross, to advance to the knockout stages. She failed to finish her first round heat, and did not advance.

As of April 2013, her best finish at the World Championships is 5th, in 2013.

Wörner made her World Cup debut in February 2008. As of March 2013, she has three World Cup victories, with the first coming at Blue Mountain in 2010/11. Her best World Cup overall finish in ski cross is 7th, in 2010/11.

== World Cup podiums ==
Date	Location	Rank	Event
7 January 2011	St. Johann	3rd place, bronze medalist(s)	Ski cross
11 February 2011	Blue Mountain	1st place, gold medalist(s)	Ski cross
7 January 2012	St. Johann	2nd place, silver medalist(s)	Ski cross
15 January 2013	Are	1st place, gold medalist(s)	Ski cross
16 March 2013	Megeve	1st place, gold medalist(s)	Ski cross
