= John Teller =

American freestyle skier

Medal record

Men's Freestyle Skiing

Representing the United States

FIS Freestyle World Ski Championships
Bronze medal – third place	2013 Voss	Ski cross

Winter X Games
Gold medal – first place	2011 Aspen	Ski Cross

John Teller (born March 9, 1983) is an American freestyle skier who specializes in ski cross. He won the Skier X event at Winter X Games XV, upsetting favorite Chris Del Bosco.

Teller began his career in alpine, but has made the transition to ski cross, supporting his endeavor by working as an auto mechanic. On January 7, 2011, in St. Johann in Tirol, Austria, Teller became the first American to win a Ski Cross World Cup race.

Teller is based in Mammoth Lakes, California.
