= Bischofswiesen =

- Municipality
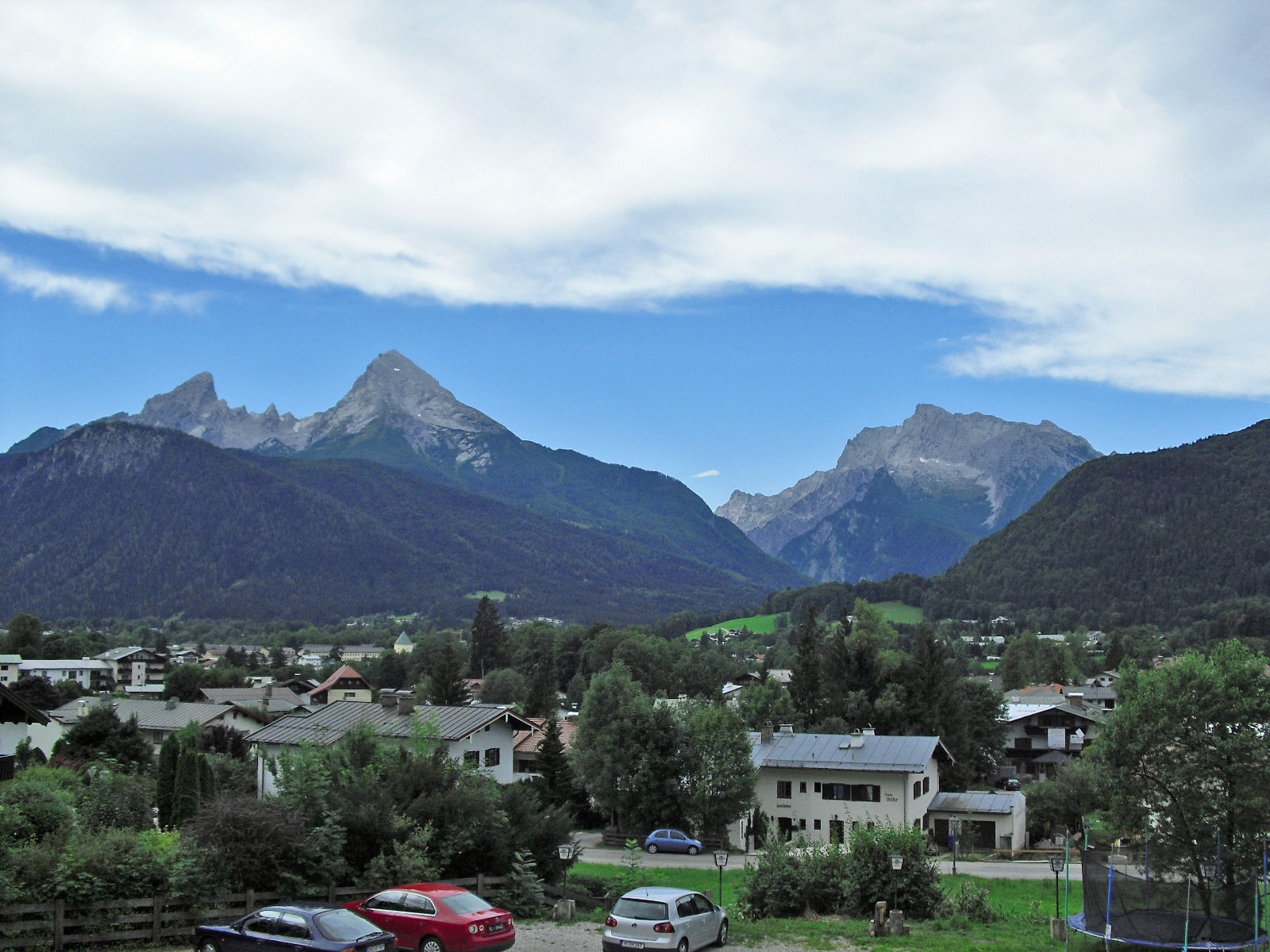
- Bischofswiesen

- Coat of arms

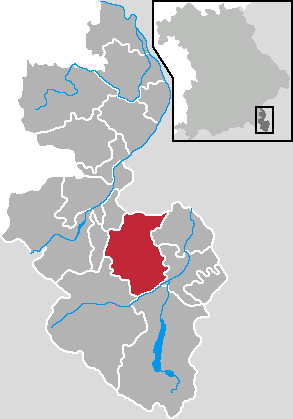
- Location of Bischofswiesen within Berchtesgadener Land district
- Interactive map of Bischofswiesen
- Location within Germany Location within Bavaria
- Coordinates: 47°38′58″N 12°57′50″E
- Country: Germany
- State: Bavaria
- Admin. region: Oberbayern
- District: Berchtesgadener Land

Government
  - Mayor (2020–26): Thomas Weber (CSU)

Area
  - Total: 34.46 km^{2} (13.31 sq mi)
- Elevation: 610 m (2,000 ft)

Population (2025-12-31)
  - Total: 6,997
  - Density: 203.0/km^{2} (525.9/sq mi)
- Time zone: UTC+01:00 (CET)
  - Summer (DST): UTC+02:00 (CEST)
- Postal codes: 83483
- Dialling codes: 08652
- Vehicle registration: BGL
- Website: gemeinde.bischofswiesen.de

Bischofswiesen is a municipality in the district of Berchtesgadener Land in Bavaria in Germany.
