= Olha Volkova =

Ukrainian freestyle skier

Personal information
- Nationality: Ukrainian
- Born: 5 July 1986 (age 39) Mykolaiv, Ukrainian SSR, Soviet Union

Sport
- Country: Ukraine
- Sport: Freestyle skiing
Medal record
Women's Freestyle skiing
Representing Ukraine
FIS Freestyle World Ski Championships
Bronze medal – third place	2011 Deer Valley	Aerials

Olha Volodymyrivna Volkova (Ukrainian: Ольга Володимирівна Волкова; born 5 July 1986 in Mykolaiv) is a retired freestyle skier from Ukraine who specializes in aerials. She won a bronze medal at the 2011 FIS Freestyle World Ski Championships.

== World Cup podiums ==
Date	Location	Rank	Event
29 January 2011	Calgary	3rd place, bronze medalist(s)	Aerials
12 February 2011	Moscow	2nd place, silver medalist(s)	Aerials
15 January 2012	Mont Gabriel	1st place, gold medalist(s)	Aerials
29 January 2012	Calgary	3rd place, bronze medalist(s)	Aerials
17 February 2012	Kreischberg	2nd place, silver medalist(s)	Aerials
