= Nick Zoricic =

Bosnian-Canadian skier (1983–2012)

Personal information
- Nationality: Canadian
- Born: Nikola Zoričić; February 19, 1983 Sarajevo, SR Bosnia-Herzegovina, SFR Yugoslavia
- Died: March 10, 2012 (aged 29) Grindelwald, Switzerland
- Height: 6 ft 3 in (191 cm)
- Weight: 200 lb (91 kg)
- Website: www.nzfoundation.ca

Sport
- Country: Canada
- Sport: Ski Cross Giant Slalom Slalom skiing

Achievements and titles
- World finals: 2011 St. Johann, AUT World Cup; Silver; 2012 Les Contamines, FRA World Cup; Bronze
- National finals: 2009 Ski Cross Canadian Championships; Bronze

Nikola Zoricic (19 February 1983 – 10 March 2012) was a Bosnian-Canadian ski cross skier who died following a severe crash during the eighth-finals of a World Cup event in Grindelwald, Switzerland.

== Life and career ==
Zoricic was born in Sarajevo, SR Bosnia and Herzegovina, SFR Yugoslavia. He grew up in Toronto after emigrating to Canada with his family at the age of five. As is common among ski-cross athletes, Zoricic was an alpine ski racer before taking up ski-cross. In December 1998, he was No. 1 ranked in the world in slalom for his age group. Zoricic started his first World Cup race in Park City and scored his first top 10 finish at the Nor-Am Cup in Colorado. During the 2003–04 and 2004–05 seasons, he competed in four World Cup slaloms but was never able to advance past the first round of competition. For several years, he tried in vain to compete with the world's best slalom skiers but injuries did not let him to move up the ranking. In 2008 he decided to switch to freestyle skiing instead.

Zoricic made his ski-cross debut at the Freestyle World Cup on 19 January 2009 in Lake Placid, finishing in 61st. He earned his first World Cup points on 24 February of that year when he finished 15th at Branäs, Sweden. During the 2009–10 season, he failed to qualify for the 2010 Winter Olympics in Vancouver.

Zoricic's greatest success came in the 2010–11 season. That year, he was never ranked lower than eighth and made his first World Cup podium on 7 January 2011 by finishing second at St. Johann in Tyrol. A year later, on 15 January 2012, he finished third in the World Cup race at Les Contamines-Montjoie.

== Death ==
At the World Cup race on 10 March 2012 in Grindelwald, Switzerland, Zoricic crashed hard head first into netting lining the course after going wide and falling on the final jump. He was knocked unconscious, suffered severe skull and brain trauma and was airlifted to a hospital in Interlaken where he was later pronounced dead.

After his death there has been much controversy over the possible avoidance of his death. Swiss police have said the tragedy was a sporting accident and not due to any flaw in the ski course. Zoricic's family and some racers suggest there were a number of issues with the final jump and the course finish. Zoricic's family threatened to sue the International Ski Federation and Alpine Canada if they refuse to launch an independent investigation.
