= Scotty Bahrke =

American freestyle skier

Scotty Bahrke (born July 19, 1985) is an American freestyle skier specializing in aerial skiing. He is a member of the US ski team, and participated in the 2010 Winter Olympics in Vancouver. Bahrke was not originally named to the Olympic team, but was added to the team five days before the men's aerials event to replace Dylan Ferguson, who was recovering from a recent appendectomy. In his Olympic debut, Bahrke scored 168.72 in the first round of competition and was ranked 23rd. He did not qualify for the finals.

Bahrke's older sister Shannon is also an Olympic freestyle skier for the US.
