= Jeremy Cota =

American freestyle skier

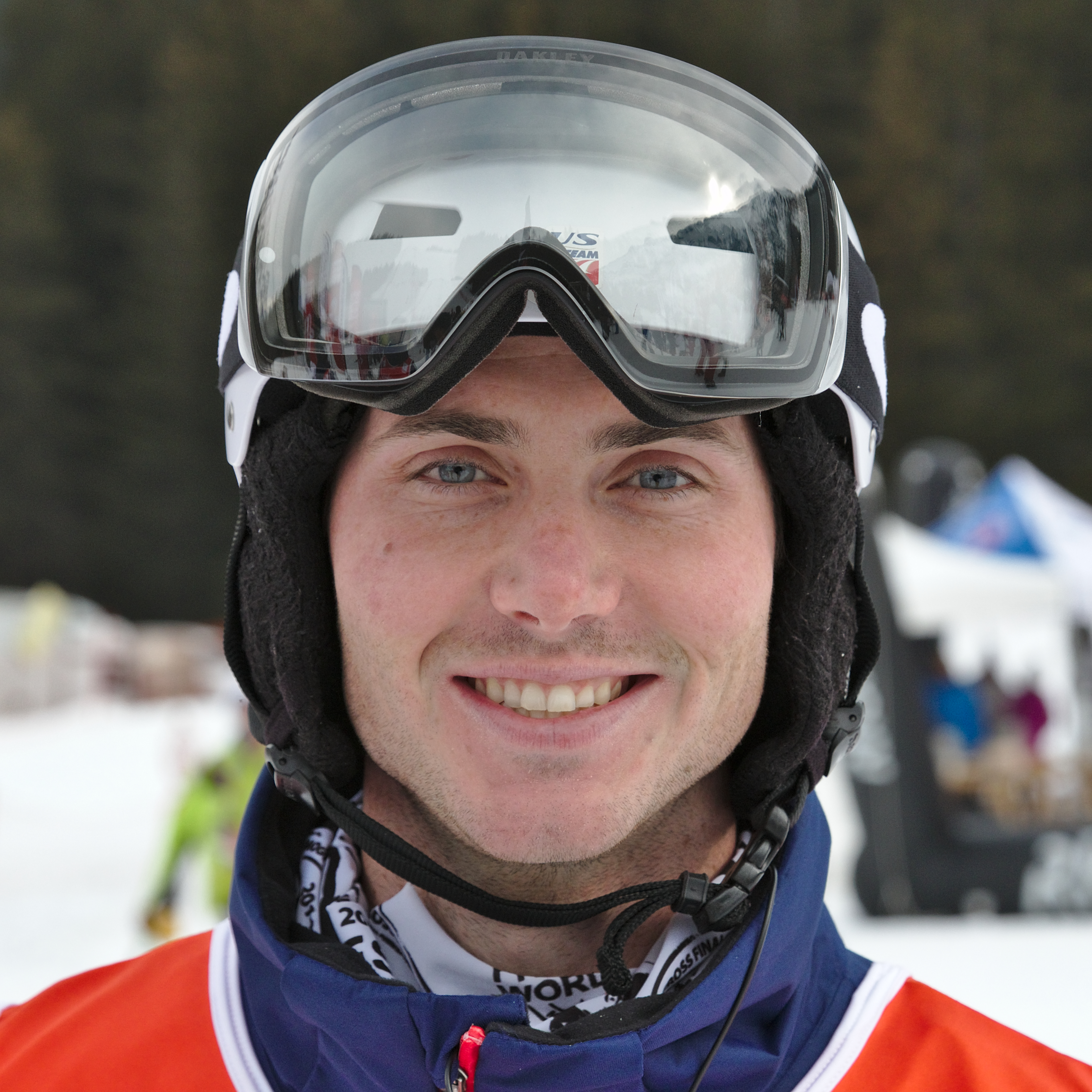
Jeremy Cota

Jeremy Cota (born October 24, 1988) is an athlete on the U.S. Ski Team; he competes in the freestyle skiing events of Moguls and Dual Moguls.

== Early years ==
Cota was born in Greenville, Maine and attended Carrabassett Valley Academy in Carrabassett, Maine.

== United States Ski Team ==
Cota was the 2009 NorAm champion. His rookie season on the World Cup (2010), he had four top-15 results, including placing 6th in his first World Cup and 7th in his second, both in Deer Valley, Utah, on January 14 and 16, 2010, respectively. In the US National Championships that same year (2010), which took place in Squaw Valley, California, Cota placed 2nd in Moguls, and 1st in Dual Moguls, his first US National Championships title.

On January 22, 2011, Cota earned his first World Cup podium, with a 3rd place in the Lake Placid, New York, World Cup. He just missed the podium of the World Ski Championships in Deer Valley, Utah, in 2011 with 4th place in Moguls.

Cota won his second US National Championships title, this time in Moguls, on March 23, 2012, in Stratton, Vermont.

As of 2012, Cota's highest world ranking was 3rd in Moguls in 2012, and he has been on the World Cup podium six times, all in 2011 and 2012: he placed 2nd four times in 2012, and he placed 3rd twice in 2011.

There are several coaches for the mogul skiers on the US Ski Team, but in April 2012 an article reported that Cota works primarily with only one of these US Ski Team coaches: "Cota works pretty much with one coach, Austrian, Harald Marbler." Marbler is the husband and former coach of Austrian mogul skier, Margarita Marbler, a three-time Olympian who has won seven World Cups.
