= Stadl an der Mur =

- Former municipality
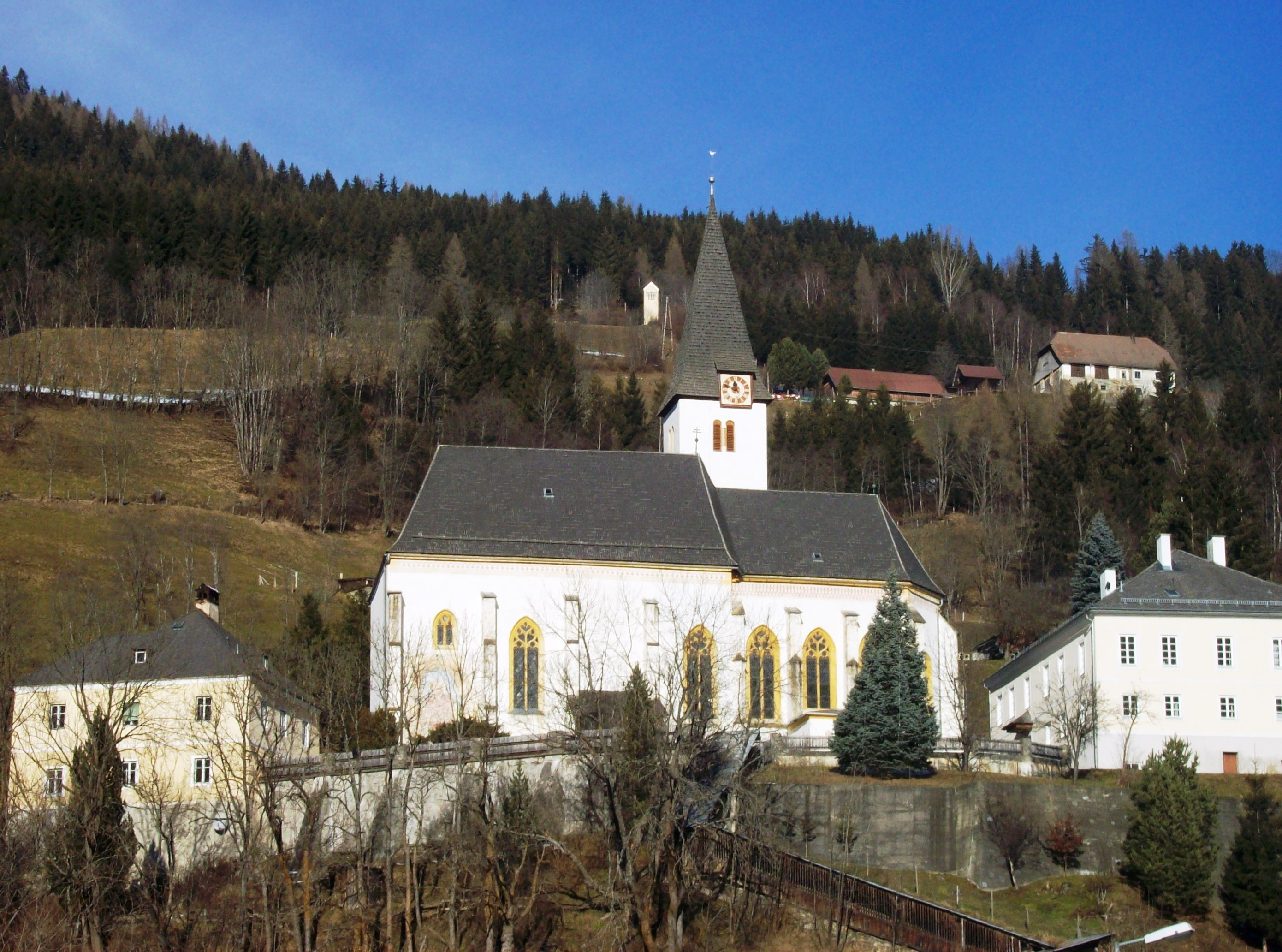
- Stadl an der Mur parish church

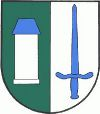
- Coat of arms

- Location within Austria
- Coordinates: 47°05′00″N 13°58′00″E
- Country: Austria
- State: Styria
- District: Murau

Area
  - Total: 106.73 km^{2} (41.21 sq mi)
- Elevation: 884 m (2,900 ft)

Population (1 January 2016)
  - Total: 968
  - Density: 9.07/km^{2} (23.5/sq mi)
- Time zone: UTC+1 (CET)
  - Summer (DST): UTC+2 (CEST)
- Postal code: 8862
- Area code: 03534
- Vehicle registration: MU

Stadl an der Mur is a former municipality in the district of Murau in the Austrian state of Styria. Since the 2015 Styria municipal structural reform, it is part of the municipality Stadl-Predlitz.

== Geography ==
The municipality lies in the upper valley of the Mur about 16 km west of Murau.
