= FIS Freestyle World Ski Championships 2013 – Men's dual moguls =

The men's dual moguls competition of the FIS Freestyle World Ski Championships 2013 was held at Myrkdalen-Voss, Norway on March 7 (qualifying) and March 8 (finals). 51 athletes from 18 countries competed.

== Results ==
=== Qualification ===
The following are the results of the qualification.

Rank	Bib	Name	Country	Score	Notes
1	2	Alexandre Bilodeau	Canada	26.45	Q
2	1	Mikaël Kingsbury	Canada	25.86	Q
3	6	Sho Endo	Japan	25.45	Q
4	52	Brodie Summers	Australia	25.38	Q
5	3	Patrick Deneen	United States	24.99	Q
6	13	Dmitriy Reiherd	Kazakhstan	24.88	Q
7	7	Alexandr Smyshlyaev	Russia	24.67	Q
8	26	Sam Hall	Australia	24.53	Q
9	20	Ludvig Fjällström	Sweden	24.41	Q
10	8	Philippe Marquis	Canada	24.34	Q
11	12	Per Spett	Sweden	24.31	Q
12	21	Arttu Kiramo	Finland	24.31	Q
13	35	Jimi Salonen	Finland	24.31	Q
14	22	Choi Jae-Woo	South Korea	24.20	Q
15	5	Marc-Antoine Gagnon	Canada	24.13	Q
16	36	Ville Miettunen	Finland	23.86	Q
17	19	Nobuyuki Nishi	Japan	23.76	
18	11	Anthony Benna	France	23.71	
19	34	Jussi Penttala	Finland	23.69	
20	15	Andrey Volkov	Russia	23.47	
21	10	Dylan Walczyk	United States	23.33	
22	4	Bradley Wilson	United States	23.25	
23	18	Sacha Theocharis	France	23.21	
24	23	Ivan Panfilov	Russia	22.87	
25	29	Denis Dolgodvorov	Russia	22.80	
26	24	Arnaud Burille	France	22.77	
27	32	Adam Gummesson	Sweden	22.71	
28	17	Giacomo Matiz	Italy	22.56	
29	42	Darius Baradaran	Iran	22.33	
30	53	Cedric Rochon	Canada	22.25	
31	9	Bryon Wilson	United States	22.24	
32	48	Knut Lemme	Norway	21.43	
33	39	Kim Ji-Hyon	South Korea	20.13	
34	38	Seo Myung-Joon	South Korea	18.99	
35	51	Vaclav Novak	Czech Republic	18.74	
36	45	Zhao Yang	China	16.87	
37	46	Lukáš Vaculík	Czech Republic	15.35	
38	14	Matt Graham	Australia	15.06	
39	43	Chen Kang	China	14.83	
40	37	Marco Tadé	Switzerland	14.58	
41	31	Dmitriy Barmashov	Kazakhstan	14.42	
42	25	Sora Yoshikawa	Japan	12.06	
43	49	Nejc German	Slovenia	11.47	
44	44	Ning Suning	China	11.22	
45	28	Motoki Shikata	Japan	10.99	
46	50	Joakim Rykke Stabaek	Norway	10.49	
47	30	Pavel Kolmakov	Kazakhstan	7.31	
48	41	Jens Lauritz	Sweden	4.75	
	16	Vinjar Slatten	Norway	DNF	
	27	Tevje-Lie Andersen	Norway	DNF	
	40	Colin Lang	Poland	DNS	

=== Final ===
The following are the results of the final.

Round of 16
1	Alexandre Bilodeau (CAN)	W
16	Ville Miettunen (FIN)
8	Sam Hall (AUS)	W
9	Ludvig Fjällström (SWE)
5	Patrick Deneen (USA)	W
12	Arttu Kiramo (FIN)
4	Brodie Summers (AUS)
13	Jimi Salonen (FIN)	W
3	Sho Endo (JPN)	W
14	Choi Jae-Woo (KOR)
6	Dmitriy Reiherd (KAZ)
11	Per Spett (SWE)	W
7	Alexandr Smyshlyaev (RUS)
10	Philippe Marquis (CAN)	W
2	Mikaël Kingsbury (CAN)	W
15	Marc-Antoine Gagnon (CAN)

Quarterfinals
1	Alexandre Bilodeau (CAN)	W
8	Sam Hall (AUS)
5	Patrick Deneen (USA)	W
13	Jimi Salonen (FIN)
3	Sho Endo (JPN)
11	Per Spett (SWE)	W
10	Philippe Marquis (CAN)
2	Mikaël Kingsbury (CAN)	W

Semifinals
1	Alexandre Bilodeau (CAN)	W
5	Patrick Deneen (USA)
11	Per Spett (SWE)
2	Mikaël Kingsbury (CAN)	W

Finals
1	Alexandre Bilodeau (CAN)	1st place, gold medalist(s)
2	Mikaël Kingsbury (CAN)	2nd place, silver medalist(s)
Third place
5	Patrick Deneen (USA)	3rd place, bronze medalist(s)
11	Per Spett (SWE)
