= FIS Freestyle World Ski Championships 2013 – Men's moguls =

The men's moguls competition of the FIS Freestyle World Ski Championships 2013 was held at Myrkdalen-Voss, Norway on March 5 (qualifying) and March 6 (finals). 51 athletes from 18 countries competed.

== Results ==
=== Qualification ===
The following are the results of the qualification.

Rank	Bib	Name	Country	Run 1	Run 2	Notes
1	1	Mikaël Kingsbury	Canada	26.76		Q
2	2	Alexandre Bilodeau	Canada	26.39		Q
3	12	Per Spett	Sweden	25.15		Q
4	3	Patrick Deneen	United States	25.02		Q
5	6	Sho Endo	Japan	24.83		Q
6	26	Sam Hall	Australia	24.62		Q
7	5	Marc-Antoine Gagnon	Canada	24.42		Q
8	4	Bradley Wilson	United States	24.27		Q
9	22	Choi Jae-Woo	South Korea	24.14		Q
10	14	Matt Graham	Australia	24.07		Q
11	8	Philippe Marquis	Canada	24.04	24.18	Q
12	16	Vinjar Slatten	Norway	23.74	23.90	Q
13	7	Alexandr Smyshlyaev	Russia	22.36	23.89	Q
14	10	Dylan Walczyk	United States	23.07	23.77	Q
15	9	Bryon Wilson	United States	23.18	23.59	Q
16	52	Brodie Summers	Australia	20.28	23.43	Q
17	20	Ludvig Fjällström	Sweden	22.31	23.38	Q
18	34	Jussi Penttala	Finland	22.79	23.28	Q
19	32	Adam Gummesson	Sweden	22.31	23.12	
20	21	Arttu Kiramo	Finland	23.77	22.91	
21	27	Tevje-Lie Andersen	Norway	22.96	22.84	
22	13	Dmitriy Reiherd	Kazakhstan	22.10	22.79	
23	11	Anthony Benna	France	20.95	22.71	
24	41	Jens Lauritz	Sweden	23.10	22.55	
25	28	Motoki Shikata	Japan	21.15	22.48	
26	15	Andrey Volkov	Russia	23.47	22.29	
27	29	Denis Dolgodvorov	Russia	20.89	22.25	
28	42	Darius Baradaran	Iran	21.54	21.99	
29	25	Sora Yoshikawa	Japan	21.80	21.95	
30	23	Ivan Panfilov	Russia	22.14	21.86	
31	18	Sacha Theocharis	France	22.49	21.82	
32	31	Dmitriy Barmashov	Kazakhstan	19.82	21.76	
33	19	Nobuyuki Nishi	Japan	22.64	21.68	
34	37	Marco Tadé	Switzerland	17.41	21.61	
35	36	Ville Miettunen	Finland	22.56	21.59	
36	38	Seo Myung-Joon	South Korea	15.37	21.33	
37	30	Pavel Kolmakov	Kazakhstan	20.64	21.15	
38	35	Jimi Salonen	Finland	21.10	20.59	
39	47	Guilbaut Colas	France	22.65	20.28	
40	39	Kim Ji-Hyon	South Korea	22.00	19.62	
41	48	Knut Lemme	Norway	22.35	19.59	
42	44	Ning Suning	China	18.02	19.29	
43	51	Vaclav Novak	Czech Republic	19.33	18.25	
44	45	Zhao Yang	China	14.86	17.45	
45	50	Joakim Rykke Stabaek	Norway	18.27	15.52	
46	43	Chen Kang	China	15.22	14.51	
47	17	Giacomo Matiz	Italy	21.66	8.43	
48	46	Lukáš Vaculík	Czech Republic	17.05	5.54	
49	24	Arnaud Burille	France	22.44	DNF	
50	49	Nejc German	Slovenia	13.95	DNS	
	40	Colin Lang	Poland	DNS	DNS	

=== Final ===
The following are the results of the final.

Rank	Bib	Name	Country	Run 1	Run 2	Notes
1st place, gold medalist(s)	1	Mikaël Kingsbury	Canada	26.99	27.59	
2nd place, silver medalist(s)	2	Alexandre Bilodeau	Canada	25.86	26.95	
3rd place, bronze medalist(s)	3	Patrick Deneen	United States	25.83	25.90	
4	14	Matt Graham	Australia	25.40	24.42	
5	22	Choi Jae-Woo	South Korea	26.06	23.94	
6	12	Per Spett	Sweden	25.76	23.38	
7	52	Brodie Summers	Australia	25.07		
8	4	Bradley Wilson	United States	24.82		
9	16	Vinjar Slatten	Norway	24.81		
10	9	Bryon Wilson	United States	24.81		
11	26	Sam Hall	Australia	24.60		
12	6	Sho Endo	Japan	24.59		
13	7	Alexandr Smyshlyaev	Russia	24.55		
14	10	Dylan Walczyk	United States	24.31		
15	8	Philippe Marquis	Canada	24.29		
16	20	Ludvig Fjällström	Sweden	24.11		
17	5	Marc-Antoine Gagnon	Canada	23.64		
18	34	Jussi Penttala	Finland	DNF		
