= FIS Freestyle World Ski Championships 2011 – Men's dual moguls =

The men's dual moguls competition of the FIS Freestyle World Ski Championships 2011 was held at Deer Valley, United States on February 5.

== Qualification ==
| Rank | Bib | Name | Country | Time | Score | | | Total | Notes |
| Rank | Bib | Name | Country | Time | Turns | Air | Time | Total | Notes |
|---|---|---|---|---|---|---|---|---|---|
| 1 | 3 | Alexandre Bilodeau | Canada | 25.56 | 13.7 | 5.41 | 6.04 | 25.15 | Q |
| 2 | 2 | Mikaël Kingsbury | Canada | 25.78 | 13.2 | 5.69 | 5.80 | 24.69 | Q |
| 3 | 1 | Guilbaut Colas | France | 24.69 | 14.0 | 4.23 | 6.31 | 24.54 | Q |
| 4 | 4 | Patrick Deneen | United States | 24.97 | 13.0 | 4.69 | 6.18 | 23.87 | Q |
| 5 | 5 | Jeremy Cota | United States | 25.20 | 13.0 | 4.64 | 6.07 | 23.71 | Q |
| 6 | 6 | Alexandr Smyshlyaev | Russia | 25.84 | 12.8 | 4.64 | 5.77 | 23.21 | Q |
| 7 | 9 | Cedric Rochon | Canada | 25.78 | 12.4 | 4.93 | 5.80 | 23.13 | Q |
| 8 | 18 | Sergey Volkov | Russia | 25.30 | 12.9 | 4.04 | 6.02 | 22.96 | Q |
| 9 | 11 | Jesper Björnlund | Sweden | 26.34 | 12.9 | 4.25 | 5.53 | 22.68 | Q |
| 10 | 17 | Arttu Kiramo | Finland | 25.71 | 11.9 | 4.86 | 5.83 | 22.59 | Q |
| 11 | 34 | Ville Miettunen | Finland | 25.88 | 12.4 | 4.33 | 5.75 | 22.48 | Q |
| 12 | 13 | Nobuyuki Nishi | Japan | 25.57 | 12.4 | 3.82 | 5.90 | 22.12 | Q |
| 13 | 15 | Joseph Discoe | United States | 26.49 | 12.1 | 4.40 | 5.46 | 21.96 | Q |
| 14 | 32 | Per Spett | Sweden | 26.51 | 12.3 | 4.06 | 5.45 | 21.81 | Q |
| 15 | 14 | Marc-Antoine Gagnon | Canada | 26.86 | 11.7 | 4.76 | 5.29 | 21.75 | Q |
| 16 | 29 | Giacomo Matiz | Italy | 27.31 | 11.7 | 4.57 | 5.07 | 21.34 | Q |
| 17 | 30 | Jussi Penttala | Finland | 26.19 | 10.8 | 4.85 | 5.60 | 21.25 | |
| 18 | 20 | Sho Kashima | United States | 26.60 | 11.5 | 4.02 | 5.41 | 20.93 | |
| 19 | 31 | Sam Hall | Australia | 27.08 | 11.7 | 3.96 | 5.18 | 20.84 | |
| 20 | 26 | Lukas Vaculik | Czech Republic | 27.20 | 11.5 | 3.88 | 5.12 | 20.50 | |
| 21 | 35 | Vaclav Novak | Czech Republic | 27.77 | 11.6 | 3.76 | 4.85 | 20.21 | |
| 22 | 25 | Tevje-Lie Andersen | Norway | 26.78 | 11.0 | 3.86 | 5.32 | 20.18 | |
| 23 | 37 | Juuso Lahtela | Finland | 29.35 | 10.8 | 4.71 | 4.11 | 19.62 | |
| 24 | 27 | David Graham | Australia | 28.64 | 9.7 | 3.52 | 4.44 | 17.66 | |
| 25 | 38 | Pablo Lafranchi | Switzerland | 28.12 | 9.4 | 3.56 | 4.69 | 17.65 | |
| 26 | 43 | Andrew Longley | United Kingdom | 31.33 | 8.7 | 3.57 | 3.17 | 15.44 | |
| 27 | 28 | Vinjar Slatten | Norway | 24.12 | 4.5 | 3.40 | 6.58 | 14.48 | |
| 28 | 12 | Sho Endo | Japan | 29.84 | 6.0 | 3.63 | 3.88 | 13.51 | |
| 29 | 7 | Pierre-Alexandre Rousseau | Canada | 31.74 | 6.1 | 2.72 | 2.98 | 11.80 | |
| 30 | 41 | Bradley Stephenson | South Africa | 35.36 | 5.7 | 2.83 | 1.26 | 9.79 | |
| 31 | 24 | Adam Gummesson | Sweden | 41.37 | 3.5 | 2.30 | 0.00 | 5.80 | |
| 32 | 40 | Sun Renze | China | 40.63 | 4.2 | 0.42 | 0.00 | 4.62 | |
| | 42 | Gustav-Muus Thorkilsen | Denmark | | | | | DNF | |
| | 44 | Ji-Hyon Kim | South Korea | | | | | DNF | |

== Elimination round ==
Round of 16
G. Matiz (ITA)
A. Bilodeau (CAN)
S. Volkov (RUS)
J. Björnlund (SWE)
J. Cota (USA)
N. Nishi (JPN)
J. Discoe (USA)
P. Deneen (USA)
G. Colas (FRA)
P. Spett (SWE)
V. Miettunen (FIN)
A. Smyshlyaev (RUS)
C. Rochon (CAN)
A. Kiramo (JPN)
M.-A. Gagnon (CAN)
M. Kingsbury (CAN)

Quarterfinals
A. Bilodeau (CAN)
S. Volkov (RUS)
N. Nishi (JPN)
P. Deneen (USA)
G. Colas (FRA)
V. Miettunen (FIN)
A. Kiramo (JPN)
M. Kingsbury (CAN)

Semifinals
A. Bilodeau (CAN)
N. Nishi (JPN)
G. Colas (FRA)
M. Kingsbury (CAN)

Finals
A. Bilodeau (CAN) | 1st place, gold medalist(s)
M. Kingsbury (CAN) | 2nd place, silver medalist(s)
Third place
N. Nishi (JPN) | 3rd place, bronze medalist(s)
G. Colas (FRA) | 4
