= Freestyle skiing at the 2014 Winter Olympics – Men's moguls =

Men's moguls at the XXII Olympic Winter Games
- Venue: Rosa Khutor Extreme Park, Krasnaya Polyana, Russia
- Dates: 10 February 2014
- Competitors: 29 from 11 nations
- Winning score: 26.31

Medalists
| 1st place, gold medalist(s) | | Alexandre Bilodeau | Canada |
| 2nd place, silver medalist(s) | | Mikaël Kingsbury | Canada |
| 3rd place, bronze medalist(s) | | Alexandr Smyshlyaev | Russia |

The men's moguls event in freestyle skiing at the 2014 Winter Olympics in Sochi, Russia took place on the 10 February at the Rosa Khutor Extreme Park in Krasnaya Polyana, Sochi.

The defending Olympic is Alexandre Bilodeau, while the defending world champion was Mikaël Kingsbury also of Canada. Bilodeau and Kingsbury took gold and silver, respectively. Alexandr Smyshlyaev of Russia won the bronze medal. Bilodeau became the first freestyle skiing gold medalist to defend his Olympic title, and first repeat gold medalist.

== Qualification ==
An athlete must have placed in the top 30 in at a World Cup event after July 2012 or at the 2013 World Championships and a minimum of 80 FIS points. A total of 30 quota spots were available to athletes to compete at the games. A maximum of 4 athletes could be entered by a National Olympic Committee.

Guilbaut Colas of France withdrew after suffering a knee injury, which reduced the field to 29 athletes.

== Results ==
=== Qualification ===
In the first qualifying round, the ten best athletes directly qualify for the final. Others compete in the second qualification round.

==== Qualifying 1 ====
QF — Qualified directly for the final
QS — Qualified for the semifinal
Bib — Bib number
DNS — Did not start
DNF — Did not finish

| Rank | Bib | Name | Country | Time | Score | | | Total | Notes |
| Rank | Bib | Name | Country | Time | Turns | Air | Time | Total | Notes |
|---|---|---|---|---|---|---|---|---|---|
| 1 | 1 | Alexandre Bilodeau | Canada | 25.03 | 12.8 | 5.70 | 6.20 | 24.70 | QF |
| 2 | 2 | Mikaël Kingsbury | Canada | 25.75 | 12.5 | 5.45 | 5.86 | 23.81 | QF |
| 3 | 5 | Alexandr Smyshlyaev | Russia | 25.07 | 12.5 | 4.84 | 6.18 | 23.52 | QF |
| 4 | 4 | Sho Endo | Japan | 25.19 | 12.0 | 5.26 | 6.12 | 23.38 | QF |
| 5 | 7 | Marc-Antoine Gagnon | Canada | 25.44 | 11.6 | 5.30 | 6.00 | 22.90 | QF |
| 6 | 12 | Philippe Marquis | Canada | 25.65 | 11.2 | 5.32 | 5.91 | 22.43 | QF |
| 7 | 9 | Dmitriy Reiherd | Kazakhstan | 24.93 | 11.6 | 4.02 | 6.24 | 21.86 | QF |
| 8 | 6 | Bradley Wilson | United States | 23.39 | 10.9 | 3.81 | 6.97 | 21.68 | QF |
| 9 | 28 | Brodie Summers | Australia | 25.73 | 10.8 | 4.89 | 5.87 | 21.56 | QF |
| 10 | 10 | Matt Graham | Australia | 24.36 | 10.2 | 4.82 | 6.51 | 21.53 | QF |
| 11 | 30 | Pavel Kolmakov | Kazakhstan | 25.73 | 11.0 | 4.53 | 5.87 | 21.40 | |
| 12 | 38 | Aleksey Pavlenko | Russia | 24.88 | 10.2 | 4.31 | 6.27 | 20.78 | |
| 13 | 16 | Nobuyuki Nishi | Japan | 24.98 | 10.6 | 3.85 | 6.22 | 20.67 | |
| 14 | 35 | Giacomo Matiz | Italy | 26.48 | 10.7 | 4.40 | 5.51 | 20.61 | |
| 15 | 25 | Choi Jae-Woo | South Korea | 24.61 | 9.0 | 5.16 | 6.40 | 20.56 | |
| 16 | 34 | Ludvig Fjällström | Sweden | 26.33 | 10.2 | 4.60 | 5.58 | 20.38 | |
| 17 | 32 | Per Spett | Sweden | 25.05 | 9.0 | 5.05 | 6.19 | 20.24 | |
| 18 | 37 | Andrey Volkov | Russia | 25.58 | 10.2 | 3.90 | 5.94 | 20.04 | |
| 19 | 11 | Dale Begg-Smith | Australia | 25.06 | 9.7 | 3.86 | 6.18 | 19.74 | |
| 20 | 27 | Jimi Salonen | Finland | 24.53 | 8.9 | 4.31 | 6.43 | 19.64 | |
| 21 | 36 | Sam Hall | Australia | 24.52 | 8.7 | 3.65 | 6.44 | 18.79 | |
| 22 | 21 | Anthony Benna | France | 24.15 | 8.8 | 3.05 | 6.61 | 18.46 | |
| 23 | 24 | Jussi Penttala | Finland | 24.86 | 7.5 | 4.21 | 6.28 | 17.99 | |
| 24 | 26 | Sergey Volkov | Russia | 27.64 | 3.6 | 2.20 | 4.97 | 10.77 | |
| 25 | 3 | Patrick Deneen | United States | 23.64 | 1.1 | 2.41 | 6.85 | 10.36 | |
| 26 | 29 | Arttu Kiramo | Finland | 27.18 | 1.2 | 2.71 | 5.18 | 9.09 | |
| | 31 | Dmitriy Barmashov | Kazakhstan | | | | | DNF | |
| | 19 | Ville Miettunen | Finland | | | | | DNF | |
| | 33 | Benjamin Cavet | France | | | | | DNF | |

==== Qualifying 2 ====
| Rank | Bib | Name | Country | Time | Score | | | Total | Notes |
| Rank | Bib | Name | Country | Time | Turns | Air | Time | Total | Notes |
|---|---|---|---|---|---|---|---|---|---|
| 1 | 3 | Patrick Deneen | United States | 24.71 | 11.5 | 4.53 | 6.35 | 22.38 | Q |
| 2 | 25 | Choi Jae-Woo | South Korea | 26.08 | 10.9 | 5.30 | 5.70 | 21.90 | Q |
| 3 | 27 | Jimi Salonen | Finland | 25.26 | 10.9 | 4.86 | 6.09 | 21.85 | Q |
| 4 | 30 | Pavel Kolmakov | Kazakhstan | 25.75 | 11.5 | 4.34 | 5.86 | 21.70 | Q |
| 5 | 37 | Andrey Volkov | Russia | 25.43 | 10.6 | 4.58 | 6.01 | 21.19 | Q |
| 6 | 38 | Aleksey Pavlenko | Russia | 25.61 | 11.0 | 4.04 | 5.92 | 20.96 | Q |
| 7 | 34 | Ludvig Fjällström | Sweden | 25.44 | 9.9 | 4.60 | 6.00 | 20.50 | Q |
| 8 | 16 | Nobuyuki Nishi | Japan | 25.96 | 11.0 | 3.65 | 5.76 | 20.41 | Q |
| 9 | 33 | Benjamin Cavet | France | 25.37 | 9.4 | 4.68 | 6.04 | 20.12 | Q |
| 10 | 32 | Per Spett | Sweden | 25.81 | 9.4 | 4.88 | 5.83 | 20.11 | Q |
| 11 | 35 | Giacomo Matiz | Italy | 26.64 | 9.7 | 3.96 | 5.44 | 19.10 | |
| 12 | 29 | Arttu Kiramo | Finland | 26.17 | 9.1 | 3.97 | 5.66 | 18.73 | |
| 13 | 21 | Anthony Benna | France | 24.24 | 6.7 | 3.65 | 6.57 | 16.92 | |
| 14 | 36 | Sam Hall | Australia | 27.54 | 3.4 | 3.09 | 5.01 | 11.50 | |
| 15 | 11 | Dale Begg-Smith | Australia | 28.39 | 2.3 | 2.74 | 4.61 | 9.35 | |
| 16 | 31 | Dmitriy Barmashov | Kazakhstan | 32.87 | 0.3 | 2.41 | 2.50 | 5.21 | |
| | 24 | Jussi Penttala | Finland | | | | | DNF | |
| | 26 | Sergey Volkov | Russia | | | | | DNF | |
| | 19 | Ville Miettunen | Finland | | | | | DNS | |

=== Final ===
The finals were started at 19:00.

==== Final 1 ====
| Rank | Bib | Name | Country | Time | Score | | | Total | Notes |
| Rank | Bib | Name | Country | Time | Turns | Air | Time | Total | Notes |
|---|---|---|---|---|---|---|---|---|---|
| 1 | 5 | Alexandr Smyshlyaev | Russia | 25.14 | 12.7 | 5.52 | 6.15 | 24.37 | Q |
| 2 | 12 | Philippe Marquis | Canada | 24.58 | 12.4 | 5.51 | 6.41 | 24.32 | Q |
| 3 | 2 | Mikaël Kingsbury | Canada | 26.32 | 12.4 | 6.32 | 5.59 | 24.31 | Q |
| 4 | 7 | Marc-Antoine Gagnon | Canada | 25.79 | 11.8 | 5.81 | 5.84 | 23.45 | Q |
| 5 | 9 | Dmitriy Reiherd | Kazakhstan | 25.21 | 12.1 | 4.89 | 6.11 | 23.10 | Q |
| 6 | 33 | Benjamin Cavet | France | 25.85 | 11.5 | 5.66 | 5.81 | 22.97 | Q |
| 7 | 10 | Matt Graham | Australia | 24.85 | 11.4 | 4.81 | 6.28 | 22.49 | Q |
| 8 | 1 | Alexandre Bilodeau | Canada | 24.78 | 11.0 | 5.17 | 6.32 | 22.49 | Q |
| 9 | 3 | Patrick Deneen | United States | 24.67 | 11.6 | 4.30 | 6.37 | 22.27 | Q |
| 10 | 25 | Choi Jae-Woo | South Korea | 25.27 | 10.6 | 5.43 | 6.08 | 22.11 | Q |
| 11 | 30 | Pavel Kolmakov | Kazakhstan | 25.30 | 11.0 | 4.75 | 6.07 | 21.82 | Q |
| 12 | 32 | Per Spett | Sweden | 25.17 | 10.9 | 4.78 | 6.13 | 21.81 | Q |
| 13 | 28 | Brodie Summers | Australia | 25.73 | 11.4 | 4.51 | 5.87 | 21.78 | |
| 14 | 16 | Nobuyuki Nishi | Japan | 24.73 | 11.4 | 3.99 | 6.34 | 21.73 | |
| 15 | 4 | Sho Endo | Japan | 25.53 | 10.6 | 5.17 | 5.96 | 21.73 | |
| 16 | 38 | Aleksey Pavlenko | Russia | 24.90 | 10.8 | 4.60 | 6.26 | 21.66 | |
| 17 | 37 | Andrey Volkov | Russia | 26.17 | 11.4 | 4.58 | 5.66 | 21.64 | |
| 18 | 27 | Jimi Salonen | Finland | 24.77 | 9.5 | 4.93 | 6.32 | 20.75 | |
| 19 | 34 | Ludvig Fjällström | Sweden | 25.30 | 9.5 | 4.26 | 6.07 | 19.83 | |
| 20 | 6 | Bradley Wilson | United States | 24.83 | 1.5 | 2.11 | 6.29 | 9.90 | |

==== Final 2 ====
| Rank | Bib | Name | Country | Time | Score | | | Total | Notes |
| Rank | Bib | Name | Country | Time | Turns | Air | Time | Total | Notes |
|---|---|---|---|---|---|---|---|---|---|
| 1 | 2 | Mikaël Kingsbury | Canada | 26.37 | 12.5 | 6.47 | 5.57 | 24.54 | Q |
| 2 | 7 | Marc-Antoine Gagnon | Canada | 25.61 | 12.2 | 6.04 | 5.92 | 24.16 | Q |
| 3 | 1 | Alexandre Bilodeau | Canada | 25.91 | 12.2 | 5.91 | 5.78 | 23.89 | Q |
| 4 | 5 | Alexandr Smyshlyaev | Russia | 25.22 | 12.6 | 5.14 | 6.11 | 23.85 | Q |
| 5 | 9 | Dmitriy Reiherd | Kazakhstan | 24.71 | 12.2 | 4.93 | 6.35 | 23.48 | Q |
| 6 | 3 | Patrick Deneen | United States | 24.00 | 11.7 | 4.94 | 6.68 | 23.32 | Q |
| 7 | 10 | Matt Graham | Australia | 25.08 | 12.1 | 5.04 | 6.17 | 23.31 | |
| 8 | 33 | Benjamin Cavet | France | 26.31 | 11.0 | 5.87 | 5.59 | 22.46 | |
| 9 | 12 | Philippe Marquis | Canada | 24.07 | 10.1 | 5.50 | 6.65 | 22.25 | |
| 10 | 30 | Pavel Kolmakov | Kazakhstan | 25.73 | 10.7 | 3.46 | 5.87 | 20.03 | |
| 11 | 32 | Per Spett | Sweden | 27.39 | 3.5 | 4.88 | 5.09 | 13.47 | |
| | 25 | Choi Jae-Woo | South Korea | | | | | DNF | |

==== Final 3 ====
| Rank | Bib | Name | Country | Time | Score | | | Total | Notes |
| Rank | Bib | Name | Country | Time | Turns | Air | Time | Total | Notes |
|---|---|---|---|---|---|---|---|---|---|
| 1st place, gold medalist(s) | 1 | Alexandre Bilodeau | Canada | 24.81 | 13.1 | 6.91 | 6.30 | 26.31 | |
| 2nd place, silver medalist(s) | 2 | Mikaël Kingsbury | Canada | 25.25 | 12.0 | 6.62 | 6.09 | 24.71 | |
| 3rd place, bronze medalist(s) | 5 | Alexandr Smyshlyaev | Russia | 24.94 | 12.4 | 5.70 | 6.24 | 24.34 | |
| 4 | 7 | Marc-Antoine Gagnon | Canada | 25.56 | 11.5 | 5.90 | 5.95 | 23.35 | |
| 5 | 9 | Dmitriy Reiherd | Kazakhstan | 24.21 | 11.4 | 4.82 | 6.58 | 22.80 | |
| 6 | 3 | Patrick Deneen | United States | 23.83 | 11.0 | 4.40 | 6.76 | 22.16 | |
