= FIS Freestyle Ski and Snowboarding World Championships 2015 – Men's moguls =

The men's moguls competition of the FIS Freestyle Ski and Snowboarding World Championships 2015 was held at Kreischberg, Austria on January 18 (qualifying and finals). 45 athletes from 19 countries competed.

== Qualification ==
The following are the results of the qualification.

Rank	Bib	Name	Country	Q1	Q2	Notes
1	1	Mikaël Kingsbury	Canada	86.59		Q
2	6	Simon Pouliot-Cavanagh	Canada	84.41		Q
3	5	Alexandr Smyshlyaev	Russia	83.85		Q
4	9	Marc-Antoine Gagnon	Canada	83.15		Q
5	21	Aleksey Pavlenko	Russia	82.88		Q
6	4	Matt Graham	Australia	82.36		Q
7	2	Philippe Marquis	Canada	82.10		Q
8	7	Patrick Deneen	United States	81.26		Q
9	33	Sacha Theocharis	France	80.16		Q
10	25	Yohann Seigneur	France	79.26	83.22	Q
11	8	Anthony Benna	France	77.75	82.25	Q
12	20	Jussi Penttala	Finland	77.33	81.21	Q
13	12	Thomas Rowley	United States	79.90	79.60	Q
14	17	Nobuyuki Nishi	Japan	78.31	79.52	Q
15	26	Tevje Lie Andersen	Norway	74.88	79.37	Q
16	34	Pavel Kolmakov	Kazakhstan	77.42	78.60	Q
17	10	Troy Murphy	United States	77.41	78.19	Q
18	31	Dmitriy Reiherd	Kazakhstan	74.79	78.17	Q
19	30	Sergey Volkov	Russia	75.81	77.73	
20	16	Marco Tadé	Switzerland	79.39	77.62	
21	29	Ludvig Fjallstrom	Sweden	76.78	76.41	
22	23	Kerrian Chunlaud	Canada	74.48	75.79	
23	22	Sora Yoshikawa	Japan	78.99	75.61	
24	19	Sho Kashima	United States	74.54	74.96	
25	24	Per Spett	Sweden	77.49	73.88	
26	41	Kim Ji-hyon	South Korea	76.75	72.40	
27	28	Vinjar Slatten	Norway	77.62	68.78	
28	39	Arwed Loth	Germany	74.78	67.66	
29	32	Seo Myung-joon	South Korea	73.65	50.99	
30	14	Jimi Salonen	Finland	73.16		
31	35	Maksim Mikhaylov	Russia	72.47		
32	48	Felix Pfeiffer	Germany	71.23		
33	43	Julius Garbe	Germany	70.66		
34	40	Felix Elofsson	Sweden	70.34		
35	44	Dmitriy Barmashov	Kazakhstan	70.22		
36	49	Giacomo Matiz	Italy	68.55		
37	50	Daniel Honzig	Czech Republic	63.82		
38	45	Jannick Fjeldsoe	Denmark	61.83		
39	46	Andrew Longley	Great Britain	54.24		
40	37	Sascha Posch	Austria	50.44		
41	36	Sergiy Chmel	Ukraine	47.29		
42	42	Thomas Aigner	Austria	26.83		
43	47	Adrien Bouard	Germany	24.38		
	38	Chen Kang	China	DNF		
	27	Benjamin Cavet	France	DNS		

== Final ==
The following are the results of the finals.

Rank	Bib	Name	Country	Final 1	Final 2
1st place, gold medalist(s)	8	Anthony Benna	France	85.83	86.89
2nd place, silver medalist(s)	1	Mikaël Kingsbury	Canada	87.44	86.54
3rd place, bronze medalist(s)	5	Alexandr Smyshlyaev	Russia	83.75	85.68
4	7	Patrick Deneen	United States	84.29	85.64
5	9	Marc-Antoine Gagnon	Canada	84.91	84.78
6	2	Philippe Marquis	Canada	82.69	DNF
7	12	Thomas Rowley	United States	82.48	
8	33	Sacha Theocharis	France	80.43	
9	20	Jussi Penttala	Finland	79.74	
10	26	Tevje Lie Andersen	Norway	78.07	
11	10	Troy Murphy	United States	78.06	
12	31	Dmitriy Reiherd	Kazakhstan	77.84	
13	34	Pavel Kolmakov	Kazakhstan	74.83	
14	25	Yohann Seigneur	France	74.71	
15	21	Aleksey Pavlenko	Russia	73.41	
16	4	Matt Graham	Australia	72.39	
17	6	Simon Pouliot-Cavanagh	Canada	60.17	
18	17	Nobuyuki Nishi	Japan	48.67	
