= 2013–14 FIS Freestyle Skiing World Cup =

Freestyle skiing competitive season

Freestyle Skiing World Cup 2013/14
Discipline	Men	Women
Overall	(Canada) Mikaël Kingsbury	(United States) Hannah Kearney
Moguls	(Canada) Mikaël Kingsbury	(United States) Hannah Kearney
Aerials	(China) Zhongqing Liu	(China) Nina Li
Ski Cross	(Sweden) Victor Öhling Norberg	(Canada) Marielle Thompson
Halfpipe	(Canada) Justin Dorey	(United States) Devin Logan
Slopestyle	(Sweden) Jesper Tjäder	(Germany) Lisa Zimmermann
- Nations Cup: United States

Competition
Locations	22	22
Individual	36	36
Cancelled	4	4

The 2013/14 FIS Freestyle Skiing World Cup was the thirty fifth World Cup season in freestyle skiing organised by International Ski Federation. The season started on 17 August 2013 and ended on 23 March 2014. This season included five disciplines: moguls, aerials, ski cross, halfpipe and slopestyle.

== Men ==
=== Ski cross ===
Num	Season	Date	Place	Event	Winner	Second	Third	Ref.
		6 December 2013	(Canada) Nakiska	SX	high temperatures			
85	1	7 December 2013	(Canada) Nakiska	SX	(France) Jonas Devouassoux	(Switzerland) Armin Niederer	(Canada) Brady Leman	
86	2	15 December 2013	(France) Val Thorens	SX	(Austria) Andreas Matt	(Sweden) Victor Öhling Norberg	(France) Jean-Frédéric Chapuis	
87	3	21 December 2013	(Italy) Innichen	SX	(Canada) David Duncan	(Switzerland) Alex Fiva	(Canada) Brady Leman	
88	4	22 December 2013	(Italy) Innichen	SX	(Canada) David Duncan	(Austria) Andreas Matt	(Germany) Daniel Bohnacker	
		11 January 2014	(France) Megève	SX	replaced in Val Thorens			
89	5	16 January 2014 (Note: Ski cross event for men cancelled in Megève on 11 January 2014 was replaced in Val Thorens on 16 January 2014.)	(France) Val Thorens	SX	(Canada) Christopher Delbosco	(Germany) Daniel Bohnacker	(Sweden) Victor Öhling Norberg	
90	6	17 January 2014 (Note: Ski cross event for men cancelled in Bischofswiesen on 18 January 2014 was replaced in Val Thorens on 17 January 2014.)	(France) Val Thorens	SX	(United States) John Teller	(Sweden) Victor Öhling Norberg	(Canada) David Duncan	
		18 January 2014	(Germany) Bischofswiesen	SX	replaced in Val Thorens			
91	7	25 January 2014	(Austria) Kreischberg	SX	(Switzerland) Alex Fiva	(Austria) Johannes Rohrweck	(Switzerland) Michael Schmid	
92	8	7 March 2014	(Switzerland) Arosa	SX	(Switzerland) Alex Fiva	(Czech Republic) Tomas Kraus	(Norway) Didrik Bastian Juell	
93	9	15 Mar 2014	(Sweden) Åre	SX	(Sweden) Victor Öhling Norberg	(France) Jonathan Midol	(Switzerland) Armin Niederer	
94	10	16 Mar 2014	(Sweden) Åre	SX	(Austria) Thomas Zangerl	(Austria) Andreas Matt	(Switzerland) Armin Niederer	
95	11	23 Mar 2014	(France) La Plagne	SX	(France) Jean-Frédéric Chapuis	(Austria) Christoph Wahrstötter	(Canada) Brady Leman	

=== Moguls ===
Num	Season	Date	Place	Event	Winner	Second	Third	Ref.
54	1	2 March 2014	(Japan) Inawashiro	DM	(Canada) Mikaël Kingsbury	(Japan) Sho Endo	(Canada) Pascal-Olivier Gagné	
		8 March 2014	(Sweden) Åre	DM	high temperatures			
55	2	16 March 2014	(Norway) Voss-Myrkdalen	DM	(Canada) Mikaël Kingsbury	(Canada) Alexandre Bilodeau	(United States) Bradley Wilson	
56	3	21 March 2014	(France) La Plagne	DM	(Canada) Alexandre Bilodeau	(Canada) Mikaël Kingsbury	(France) Benjamin Cavet	
300	1	14 December 2013	(Finland) Ruka	MO	(Canada) Mikaël Kingsbury	(Canada) Alexandre Bilodeau	(Japan) Sho Endo	
301	2	4 January 2014	(Canada) Calgary	MO	(Canada) Mikaël Kingsbury	(Canada) Alexandre Bilodeau	(United States) Patrick Deneen	
302	3	9 January 2014	(United States) Deer Valley	MO	(Canada) Mikaël Kingsbury	(Canada) Alexandre Bilodeau	(Canada) Marc-Antoine Gagnon	
303	4	11 January 2014	(United States) Deer Valley	MO	(Canada) Alexandre Bilodeau	(Canada) Mikaël Kingsbury	(Russia) Alexandr Smyshlyaev	
304	5	15 January 2014	(United States) Lake Placid	MO	(Canada) Alexandre Bilodeau	(United States) Patrick Deneen	(United States) Bradley Wilson	
305	6	19 January 2014	(Canada) Val St. Côme	MO	(Canada) Alexandre Bilodeau	(Canada) Mikaël Kingsbury	(United States) Bradley Wilson	
306	7	1 March 2014	(Japan) Inawashiro	MO	(United States) Bradley Wilson	(Canada) Marc-Antoine Gagnon	(Canada) Mikaël Kingsbury	
307	8	15 March 2014	(Norway) Voss-Myrkdalen	MO	(Russia) Alexandr Smyshlyaev	(Canada) Alexandre Bilodeau	(United States) Patrick Deneen	

=== Aerials ===
Num	Season	Date	Place	Event	Winner	Second	Third	Ref.
300	1	15 December 2013	(China) Beida Lake	AE	(China) Zhongqing Liu	(Belarus) Anton Kushnir	(China) Zongyang Jia	
301	2	22 December 2013	(China) Beijing	AE	(Canada) Travis Gerrits	(China) Chao Wu	(China) Zongyang Jia	
302	3	10 January 2014	(United States) Deer Valley	AE	(Belarus) Anton Kushnir	(China) Guangpu Qi	(Belarus) Aleksei Grishin	
303	4	14 January 2014	(Canada) Val St. Come	AE	(China) Zhongqing Liu	(United States) Mac Bohonnon	(Australia) David Morris	
304	5	18 January 2014	(United States) Lake Placid	AE	(China) Guangpu Qi	(China) Zhongqing Liu	(Belarus) Aleksei Grishin	

=== Slopestyle ===
Num	Season	Date	Place	Event	Winner	Second	Third	Ref.
7	1	25 August 2013	(New Zealand) Cardrona	SS	(United States) Nicholas Goepper	(United Kingdom) James Woods	(Australia) Russell Henshaw	
8	2	21 December 2013	(United States) Copper Mountain	SS	(Norway) Andreas Haatveit	(United States) Nicholas Goepper	(Australia) Russell Henshaw	
9	3	10 January 2014	(United States) Breckenridge	SS	(United States) Bobby Brown	(Sweden) Jesper Tjäder	(Switzerland) Kai Mahler	
10	4	18 January 2014	(Switzerland) Gstaad	SS	(New Zealand) Josiah Wells	(Sweden) Jesper Tjäder	(Switzerland) Fabian Bösch	
11	5	22 March 2014	(Switzerland) Silvaplana	SS	(Sweden) Jesper Tjäder	(United States) Noah Wallace	(Norway) Christian Nummedal	

=== Halfpipe ===
Num	Season	Date	Place	Event	Winner	Second	Third	Ref.
23	1	17 August 2013	(New Zealand) Cardrona	HP	(Finland) Antti-Jussi Kemppainen	(United States) Aaron Blunck	(United States) Taylor Seaton	
24	2	20 December 2013	(United States) Copper Mountain	HP	(United States) Aaron Blunck	(France) Kevin Rolland	(United States) Gus Kenworthy	
25	3	3 January 2014	(Canada) Calgary	HP	(Canada) Justin Dorey	(Canada) Noah Bowman	(Canada) Matt Margetts	
26	4	12 January 2014	(United States) Breckenridge	HP	(United States) David Wise	(Canada) Mike Riddle	(France) Kevin Rolland	

== Ladies ==
=== Ski Cross ===
Num	Season	Date	Place	Event	Winner	Second	Third	Ref.
		6 December 2013	(Canada) Nakiska	SX	high temperatures			
86	1	7 December 2013	(Canada) Nakiska	SX	(Canada) Marielle Thompson	(Switzerland) Fanny Smith	(France) Ophélie David	
87	2	15 December 2013	(France) Val Thorens	SX	(Switzerland) Katrin Müller	(Switzerland) Sanna Lüdi	(France) Ophélie David	
88	3	21 December 2013	(Italy) Innichen	SX	(Switzerland) Fanny Smith	(Canada) Kelsey Serwa	(Sweden) Anna Holmlund	
89	4	22 December 2013	(Italy) Innichen	SX	(Switzerland) Katrin Müller	(Canada) Marielle Thompson	(Germany) Heidi Zacher	
		11 January 2014	(France) Megève	SX	replaced in Val Thorens			
90	5	16 January 2014 (Note: Ski cross event for ladies cancelled in Megève on 11 January 2014 was replaced in Val Thorens on 16 January 2014.)	(France) Val Thorens	SX	(Switzerland) Sanna Lüdi	(Sweden) Sandra Näslund	(Austria) Katrin Ofner	
91	6	17 January 2014 (Note: Ski cross event for ladies cancelled in Bischofswiesen on 18 January 2014 was replaced in Val Thorens on 17 January 2014.)	(France) Val Thorens	SX	(Canada) Marielle Thompson	(Switzerland) Katrin Müller	(France) Ophélie David	
		18 January 2014	(Germany) Bischofswiesen	SX	replaced in Val Thorens			
92	7	25 January 2014	(Austria) Kreischberg	SX	(France) Ophélie David	(Switzerland) Fanny Smith	(Canada) Marielle Thompson	
93	8	7 March 2014	(Switzerland) Arosa	SX	(Norway) Marte Hoeie Gjefsen	(Switzerland) Fanny Smith	(France) Ophélie David	
94	9	15 March 2014	(Sweden) Åre	SX	(Switzerland) Fanny Smith	(Canada) Marielle Thompson	(Sweden) Sandra Näslund	
95	10	16 March 2014	(Sweden) Åre	SX	(Switzerland) Fanny Smith	(France) Ophélie David	(Canada) Georgia Simmerling	
96	11	23 March 2014	(France) La Plagne	SX	(Canada) Marielle Thompson	(Switzerland) Fanny Smith	(Canada) Georgia Simmerling	

=== Moguls ===
Num	Season	Date	Place	Event	Winner	Second	Third	Ref.
53	1	2 March 2014	(Japan) Inawashiro	DM	(United States) Hannah Kearney	(Russia) Elena Muratova	(Japan) Junko Hoshino	
		8 March 2014	(Sweden) Åre	DM	high temperatures			
54	2	16 March 2014	(Norway) Voss-Myrkdalen	DM	(United States) Hannah Kearney	(Canada) Justine Dufour-Lapointe	(Canada) Chloé Dufour-Lapointe	
55	3	21 March 2014	(France) La Plagne	DM	(United States) Hannah Kearney	(Canada) Chloé Dufour-Lapointe	(Canada) Maxime Dufour-Lapointe	
301	1	14 December 2013	(Finland) Ruka	MO	(United States) Hannah Kearney	(Canada) Justine Dufour-Lapointe	(Japan) Aiko Uemura	
302	2	4 January 2014	(Canada) Calgary	MO	(Canada) Justine Dufour-Lapointe	(United States) Hannah Kearney	(Canada) Chloé Dufour-Lapointe	
303	3	9 January 2014	(United States) Deer Valley	MO	(United States) Hannah Kearney	(Canada) Chloé Dufour-Lapointe	(Canada) Justine Dufour-Lapointe	
304	4	11 January 2014	(United States) Deer Valley	MO	(United States) Hannah Kearney	(Kazakhstan) Yulia Galysheva	(Canada) Maxime Dufour-Lapointe	
305	5	15 January 2014	(United States) Lake Placid	MO	(Canada) Justine Dufour-Lapointe	(United States) Heidi Kloser	(United States) Hannah Kearney	
306	6	19 January 2014	(Canada) Val St. Côme	MO	(Canada) Chloé Dufour-Lapointe	(Canada) Justine Dufour-Lapointe	(Japan) Junko Hoshino	
307	7	1 March 2014	(Japan) Inawashiro	MO	(Canada) Justine Dufour-Lapointe	(United States) Heather McPhie	(Canada) Maxime Dufour-Lapointe	
308	8	15 March 2014	(Norway) Voss-Myrkdalen	MO	(Canada) Justine Dufour-Lapointe	(Canada) Chloé Dufour-Lapointe	(United States) Hannah Kearney	

=== Aerials ===
Num	Season	Date	Place	Event	Winner	Second	Third	Ref.
303	1	15 December 2013	(China) Beida Lake	AE	(China) Nina Li	(United States) Ashley Caldwell	(China) Sicun Xu	
304	2	21 December 2013	(China) Beijing	AE	(China) Xin Zhang	(Australia) Lydia Lassila	(China) Mengtao Xu	
305	3	10 January 2014	(United States) Deer Valley	AE	(China) Cheng Shuang	(China) Xin Zhang	(China) Mengtao Xu	
306	4	14 January 2014	(Canada) Val St. Come	AE	(Australia) Lydia Lassila	(China) Nina Li	(China) Xin Zhang	
307	5	18 January 2014	(United States) Lake Placid	AE	(China) Nina Li	(Australia) Danielle Scott	(China) Xin Zhang	

=== Slopestyle ===
Num	Season	Date	Place	Event	Winner	Second	Third	Ref.
7	1	25 August 2013	(New Zealand) Cardrona	SS	(Norway) Tiril Sjåstad Christiansen	(Canada) Dara Howell	(Germany) Lisa Zimmermann	
8	2	21 December 2013	(United States) Copper Mountain	SS	(Canada) Dara Howell	(United States) Darian Stevens	(United States) Grete Eliassen	
9	3	10 January 2014	(United States) Breckenridge	SS	(United States) Keri Herman	(Sweden) Emma Dahlström	(United States) Devin Logan	
10	4	18 January 2014	(Switzerland) Gstaad	SS	(Germany) Lisa Zimmermann	(United Kingdom) Katie Summerhayes	(Italy) Silvia Bertagna	
11	5	22 March 2014	(Switzerland) Silvaplana	SS	(Germany) Lisa Zimmermann	(Sweden) Emma Dahlström	(Switzerland) Camillia Berra	

=== Halfpipe ===
Num	Season	Date	Place	Event	Winner	Second	Third	Ref.
23	1	17 August 2013	(New Zealand) Cardrona	HP	(United States) Devin Logan	(United States) Angeli Vanlaanen	(Switzerland) Mirjam Jäger	
24	2	20 December 2013	(United States) Copper Mountain	HP	(United States) Brita Sigourney	(United States) Maddie Bowman	(France) Marie Martinod	
25	3	3 January 2014	(Canada) Calgary	HP	(United Kingdom) Rowan Cheshire	(Switzerland) Virginie Faivre	(Australia) Amy Sheehan	
26	4	12 January 2014	(United States) Breckenridge	HP	(United States) Maddie Bowman	(Japan) Ayana Onozuka	(Australia) Amy Sheehan	

== Men's standings ==
=== Overall ===
Rank		Points
1	(Canada) Mikaël Kingsbury	80.91
2	(Canada) Alexandre Bilodeau	79.91
3	(Sweden) Jesper Tjäder	65.00
4	(China) Zhongqing Liu	61.60
5	(China) Guangpu Qi	53.60

- Standings after 36 races.

=== Moguls ===
Rank		Points
1	(Canada) Mikaël Kingsbury	890
2	(Canada) Alexandre Bilodeau	879
3	(United States) Patrick Deneen	443
4	(United States) Bradley Wilson	429
5	(Russia) Alexandr Smyshlyaev	419

- Standings after 11 races.

=== Aerials ===
Rank		Points
1	(China) Zhongqing Liu	308
2	(China) Guangpu Qi	268
3	(Belarus) Anton Kushnir	243
4	(Belarus) Alexei Grishin	200
5	(Canada) Travis Gerrits	197

- Standings after 5 races.

=== Ski Cross ===
Rank		Points
1	(Sweden) Victor Öhling Norberg	494
2	(Austria) Andreas Matt	482
3	(Germany) Daniel Bohnacker	399
4	(France) Jean Frederic Chapuis	381
5	(Switzerland) Armin Niederer	376

- Standings after 11 races.

=== Halfpipe ===
Rank		Points
1	(Canada) Justin Dorey	212
2	(United States) Aaron Blunck	180
3	(Canada) Mike Riddle	145
4	(France) Kevin Rolland	140
5	(Finland) Antti-Jussi Kemppainen	129

- Standings after 4 races.

=== Slopestyle ===
Rank		Points
1	(Sweden) Jesper Tjäder	325
2	(United States) Nick Goepper	225
3	(United States) Bobby Brown	145
4	(New Zealand) Josiah Wells	122
5	(Australia) Russell Henshaw	120

- Standings after 5 races.

== Ladies' standings ==
=== Overall ===
Rank		Points
1	(United States) Hannah Kearney	77.27
2	(China) Nina Li	71.20
3	(Canada) Justine Dufour-Lapointe	70.36
4	(Canada) Marielle Thompson	68.64
5	(Switzerland) Fanny Smith	66.36

- Standings after 36 races.

=== Moguls ===
Rank		Points
1	(United States) Hannah Kearney	850
2	(Canada) Justine Dufour-Lapointe	774
3	(Canada) Chloé Dufour-Lapointe	521
4	(Canada) Maxime Dufour-Lapointe	459
5	(United States) Heather McPhie	420

- Standings after 11 races.

=== Aerials ===
Rank		Points
1	(China) Nina Li	356
2	(China) Xin Zhang	316
3	(China) Mengtao Xu	246
4	(Australia) Lydia Lassila	210
5	(China) Shuang Cheng	207

- Standings after 5 races.

=== Ski Cross ===
Rank		Points
1	(Canada) Marielle Thompson	755
2	(Switzerland) Fanny Smith	730
3	(France) Ophélie David	572
4	(Switzerland) Katrin Müller	408
5	(Sweden) Sandra Näslund	374

- Standings after 11 races.

=== Halfpipe ===
Rank		Points
1	(United States) Devin Logan	186
2	(United States) Maddie Bowman	180
3	(Australia) Amy Sheehan	170
4	(Switzerland) Mirjam Jäger	153
5	(United States) Angeli Vanlaanen	152

- Standings after 4 races.

=== Slopestyle ===
Rank		Points
1	(Germany) Lisa Zimmermann	305
2	(Sweden) Emma Dahlström	196
3	(Canada) Dara Howell	180
4	(Italy) Silvia Bertagna	151
5	(Slovakia) Zuzana Stromkova	140

- Standings after 5 races.

== Nations Cup ==
=== Overall ===
Rank		Points
1	United States	1319
2	Canada	1113
3	Switzerland	677
4	China	491
5	France	395

- Standings after 72 races.

=== Men ===
Rank		Points
1	United States	645
2	Canada	621
3	Switzerland	371
4	France	239
5	China	200

- Standings after 36 races.

=== Ladies ===
Rank		Points
1	United States	674
2	Canada	492
3	Switzerland	306
4	China	291
5	Australia	251

- Standings after 36 races.
