= Mikaël Kingsbury =

Canadian freestyle skier (born 1992)

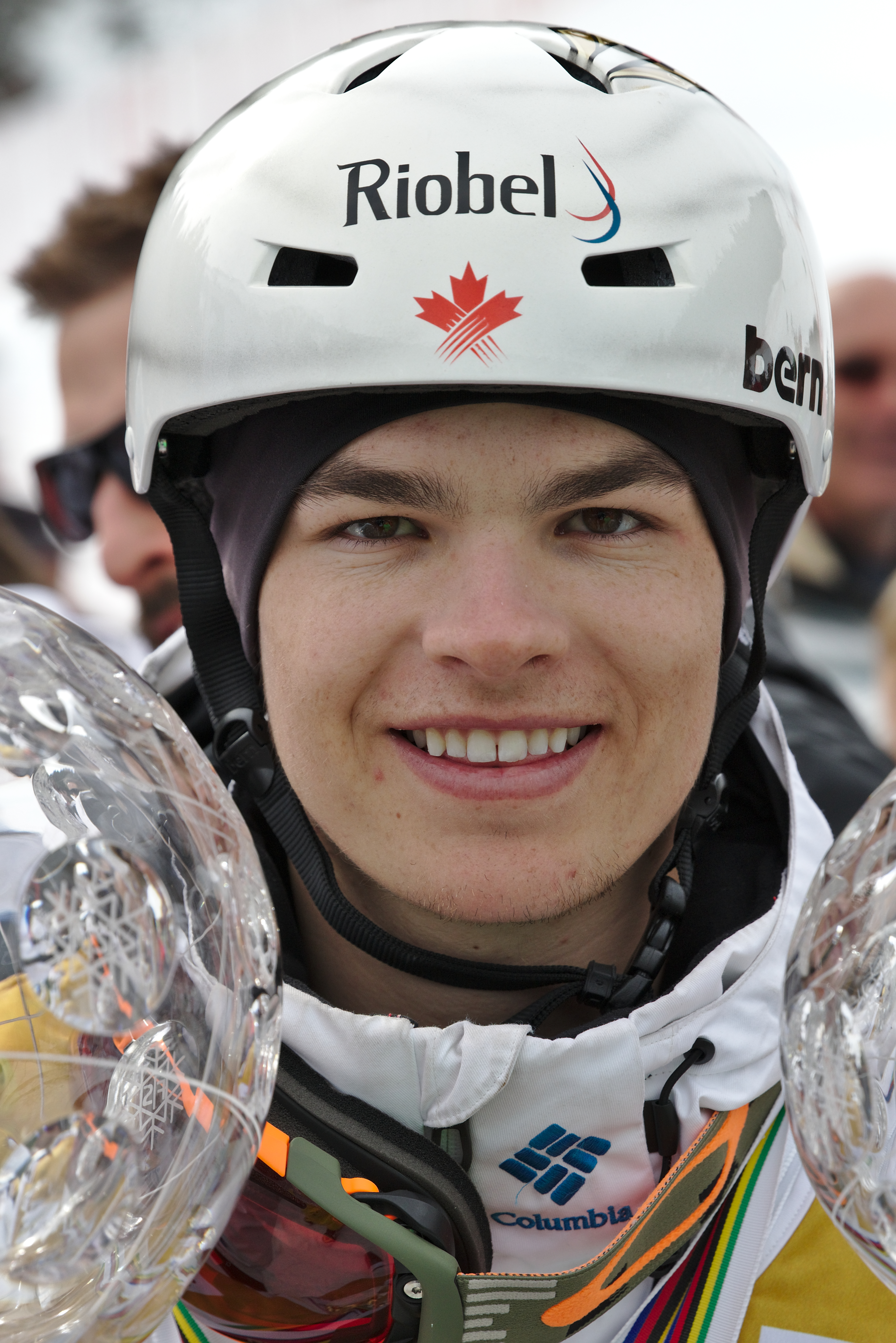
- Kingsbury in 2015

Personal information
- Born: July 24, 1992 (age 33) Sainte-Agathe-des-Monts, Quebec, Canada
- Height: 1.74 m (5 ft 9 in)

Skiing career
- Sport: Alpine skiing
- World Cup debut: January 1, 2010 (age 17)

Olympics
- Teams: 4 (2014–2026)
- Medals: 5 (2 gold)

World Championships
- Teams: 9 (2011–2026)
- Medals: 15 (9 gold)

World Cup
- Seasons: 17 – (2010–2026)
- Wins: 100
- Podiums: 143
- Overall titles: 9 – (2012–2020)
- Discipline titles: 13 – Overall Moguls (2012–2020, 2022–2025), 3 - Moguls (2022–2023, 2025), 4 - Dual Moguls (2022–2025)
Medal record
International freestyle ski competitions
Event	1st	2nd	3rd
Olympic Games	2	3	0
World Championships	9	4	2
Total	11	7	2
Men's freestyle skiing
Representing Canada
Olympic Games
Gold medal – first place	2018 Pyeongchang	Moguls
Gold medal – first place	2026 Milano Cortina	Dual moguls
Silver medal – second place	2014 Sochi	Moguls
Silver medal – second place	2022 Beijing	Moguls
Silver medal – second place	2026 Milano Cortina	Moguls
World Championships
Gold medal – first place	2013 Voss	Moguls
Gold medal – first place	2015 Kreischberg	Dual moguls
Gold medal – first place	2019 Park City	Moguls
Gold medal – first place	2019 Park City	Dual moguls
Gold medal – first place	2021 Almaty	Moguls
Gold medal – first place	2021 Almaty	Dual moguls
Gold medal – first place	2023 Bakuriani	Moguls
Gold medal – first place	2023 Bakuriani	Dual moguls
Gold medal – first place	2025 Engadin	Dual moguls
Silver medal – second place	2011 Deer Valley	Dual moguls
Silver medal – second place	2013 Voss	Dual moguls
Silver medal – second place	2015 Kreischberg	Moguls
Silver medal – second place	2025 Engadin	Moguls
Bronze medal – third place	2011 Deer Valley	Moguls
Bronze medal – third place	2017 Sierra Nevada	Moguls

Mikaël Kingsbury (born July 24, 1992) is a Canadian freestyle skier He achieved eminence early in his career after earning the 2009–10 FIS World Cup Rookie of the Year award. He is a 13-time FIS Freestyle World Cup title-holder for overall moguls and nine-time title-holder for overall freestyle, owning the records for most men's Moguls World Cup titles and Overall Freestyle World Cup titles. He also holds the records for 100 career World Cup moguls wins and 13 consecutive Freestyle World Cup event wins. He is the first man to have won both the moguls and dual moguls World Championship events (sweeping the two events three times), and has won the most medals at the Freestyle World Championships of any male competitor in history, having won a medal in 15 of the 16 events he has competed in. Kingsbury also won the Olympic silver medal in 2014, 2022 and 2026, and the gold medal in men's moguls at the 2018 Winter Olympics and men's dual moguls at the 2026 Winter Olympics.

== Career ==
=== Early success ===
After several seasons of competition in the Nor-Am Cup, Kingsbury enjoyed much greater success in 2010, winning four moguls and one dual moguls event before finishing the year on the World Cup circuit with two consecutive fourth-place finishes. He was named the 2009–10 FIS World Cup Rookie of the Year for these efforts.

Kingsbury earned his first World Cup podium in the first moguls event of his first full World Cup season, then followed this up with his first World Cup win on December 21, 2010. With the victory, he became the first 18-year-old to win a FIS Freestyle World Cup event.

Kingsbury continued his breakthrough season with one more World Cup event win and five additional medals, finishing the 2010–11 FIS Freestyle Skiing World Cup season fourth overall and third in the moguls discipline, behind countryman Alexandre Bilodeau and winner Guilbaut Colas. In the midst of this season, he competed in his first 2011 FIS World Championships and began with a bronze medal in the moguls event behind Bilodeau and winner Colas. In the dual moguls event, Kingsbury fell in the final pairing, again finishing behind Bilodeau, this time for the silver medal. Reflecting on his first World Championships, Kingsbury stated: "I never thought at the beginning of the season that I'd be able to be two times on the podium at Deer Valley, the hardest course in the world. Alex, since I was young, was my example to follow; it's awesome to be in the final against him."

=== First World Cup and World Championship titles ===
Kingsbury won six consecutive World Cup events to start the 2011–2012 season. While the streak ended with a second-place finish in the next event, Kingsbury became only the second man to podium at every FIS freestyle competition in a season, with eight golds, four silvers, and a bronze. In doing so, he won his first FIS Freestyle Crystal Globe for moguls and the overall Crystal Globe for all freestyle disciplines. "I never thought I would've been able to do this at 19 years old," Kingsbury later remarked. "But this season, I've skied great, I've been consistent every race, and I think that was the key for me."

To date, this remains his most successful World Cup season in terms of wins, podiums, and points, and his achievements during the season broke or matched several FIS records. Kingsbury's 90.77 overall points were the most achieved in a men's FIS Freestyle World Cup season since 2003. With 1180 of a maximum of 1300 points in moguls, he set a men's FIS Freestyle World Cup record for the most points in a season in an individual discipline. He became the youngest male mogul skier to win a Crystal Globe and set a record for the most podiums in a season (13), in addition to matching the record held by American Jeremy Bloom for the most consecutive World Cup wins at six.

Mikael added six victories in the 2012–13 season, in addition to one 2nd-place and two 3rd-place finishes for a total of 9 podiums in 12 events. His performance earned him his second FIS title in moguls and his second consecutive overall Crystal Globe.

At the 2013 FIS Freestyle World Ski Championships, Kingsbury won his first World Championship title in the moguls event after he also qualified first; teammate Bilodeau placed second. This was the opportunity Kingsbury had been waiting his life for. He said that "I have been waiting a while for this and dreaming about the day that I would earn the world championship title. I worked hard all summer to get to this day, and I’m very happy. When I woke up this morning, I was in a world-championship mood. I felt perfect. My body was perfect, so I knew it could be today." Kingsbury next competed in the dual moguls finals where he would find himself in the final matchup against teammate Bilodeau again. He again failed to beat him, but this still left him as the silver medalist completing a second double medal World Championships.

=== Surpassing Brassard ===
During the 2013–14 season, Kingsbury began the season with three consecutive victories. However, Canadian teammate Bilodeau, who had finished 2nd in each of the first three races, experienced a resurgence and won the next three world cup events to overtake Kingsbury in both FIS World Cup Moguls and overall standings.

At the Sochi Olympics, Kingsbury had a small stumble in his final run to finish with 24.71, finishing second to Bilodeau's 26.31 and collecting his first Olympic medal. After winning his first Olympic medal Kingsbury said: "I was going for gold, but just to be on the podium is crazy and I am with my teammate, it's just unbelievable." Based on his World Cup results, he was a gold medal favourite, but Kingsbury was surpassed by Bilodeau, who surprised again for gold.

Following the Olympic performance, Kingsbury finished 3rd, 1st, and 4th, respectively, in the next three events, while Bilodeau finished 4th, 9th, and 2nd, setting up an important dual moguls final between the two rivals in the second last event of the season, on March 16, 2014. At the age of 21, Kingsbury defeated Bilodeau in the final for his 21st career win, in the process moving him past childhood role model Jean-Luc Brassard for most World Cup wins by a Canadian (during this same event, Bilodeau's silver medal tied Brassard for most World Cup medals by a Canadian).

Entering the season's final event, Kingsbury now led Bilodeau by 3 points for the Men's overall freestyle title and by 31 points for the Men's mogul's title. In the final event, the two faced off again in the dual moguls final. Bilodeau retired with a win over Kingsbury, stating that he was "really honoured to have [his] last run against the best in the world." Kingsbury added another silver medal, and ultimately edged Bilodeau by 1 point for the overall freestyle title and 11 points for the Men's mogul title; at 890 points and 879 points respectively, Kingsbury and Bilodeau finished the season with double the points of third overall Patrick Deneen.

=== Reaching new heights: World Cup and World Championship records and Olympics success ===
The FIS had suggested before the start of the 2014–15 season that "with Bilodeau now out of the picture, the story of the... season will be whether somebody, anybody, will be able to challenge Mikael Kingsbury's claim to moguls supremacy." Kingsbury answered this question with what the Canadian Freestyle Association considered to be "arguably one of the most prolific and impressive seasons in freestyle history," punctuated by a 19–16 victory over teammate Philippe Marquis in the dual moguls finals of the eighth event of the World Cup season in Tazawako, Japan. In doing so, Kingsbury won his record seventh straight FIS World Cup moguls event after starting the season with a disappointing ninth-place finish, breaking the previous record of six consecutive wins that he had shared with Jeremy Bloom. This win was also the 28th World Cup victory of Kingsbury's young career, tying him with Frenchman Edgar Grospiron for first on the all-time list. At age 22, Kingsbury reached the milestone in 60 World Cup events compared to Grospiron's 78.

By this point, Kingsbury had already clinched his fourth straight moguls season title after winning the moguls event in Tazawako the day prior. Unfortunately, in the final event of the season, he suffered an uncharacteristic crash in his quarter-final heat and finished 8th. Despite falling short, his performance helped Canada claim the moguls Nations Cup and the FIS Freestyle overall Nations cup, the latter in an incredibly tight battle, finishing only 54 points ahead of the US. Kingsbury also finished the day with the moguls and Freestyle overall crystal globes for the fourth straight season.

In the midst of his successful World Cup season, Kingsbury won his first World Championship title in the dual moguls event, over Canadian teammates Philippe Marquis and Marc-Antoine Gagnon. This was the first time a country has swept the podium in the history of the dual moguls event at the World Championships. He was unable to defend his gold in the moguls event, finishing second to Anthony Benna after finishing first in qualification and leading into Final 2. His 2nd place showing still ensured that his streak of six consecutive podium finishes at the World Championships would continue.

Kingsbury had to wait nearly nine months for another opportunity to set the men's record for World Cup moguls skiing victories. He made good on this chance at the 2015–16 season-opening dual moguls event in Finland by defeating Benjamin Cavet of France 20–15 in the finals en route to claiming the moguls and Freestyle overall crystal globes for the fifth straight season. During the 2016–17 season, Kingsbury became the first skier to sweep the single and dual moguls competitions in Deer Valley for a second time. In the dual moguls, he beat his opponents by a combined score of 144–31 to earn his 58th men's World Cup podium, surpassing Edgar Grospiron for most all-time while extending his all-time record for wins to 37.

In January 2018, Kingsbury set a new record for the most World Cup wins, surpassing Hannah Kearney's 47. The next month, Kingsbury won his elusive Olympic gold medal in Pyeongchang with a score of 86.63. On December 11, Kingsbury was rewarded for his record-setting season when he was awarded the Lou Marsh Trophy, honouring Canada's top athlete of the year. This was followed by The Canadian Press' male athlete of the year Lionel Conacher Award on December 27; in both cases, he was the first freestyle skier to win the award.

Kingsbury missed the first three events of the shortened 2020–2021 World cup season after fracturing his T4 and T5 vertebrae while training for the opening World Cup event. He returned for the final two World Cup season events, winning both. He then swept both moguls events at the 2021 Freestyle World Championships in Kazakhstan.

On January 24, 2022, Kingsbury was named to Canada's 2022 Olympic team. He added another silver at Beijing 2022, becoming the first male moguls skier to ever win three Olympic medals.

In 2023 he became the first four-time winner of the singles moguls world championship, before extending his record number of dual moguls world championship gold titles to 4, achieving the sweep of both moguls events for the 3rd straight World Championship.

Kingsbury swept all three World Cup Moguls season titles in 2024–25 — singles, dual, and overall moguls, with a season total of 13 medals (nine golds, four silvers) across 16 events, raising his career World Cup event wins to 99. He followed this up with his 14th and 15th medals at the 2025 World Championships, capped by his 9th gold medal and 4th straight dual moguls title.

A groin injury limited Kingsbury's 2025–26 season, but he claimed his 100th career World Cup victory on January 9, 2026. Named to the Canadian team for the 2026 Winter Olympics in northern Italy, Kingsbury served as one of Canada's flag bearers at the opening ceremony, alongside fellow freestyle skier Marielle Thompson. Competing first in the moguls event, he and Australian Cooper Woods tied for the highest score in the final, each receiving 83.71 points. Woods prevailed on the tiebreaker, having the higher marks on the turns element, and so Kingsbury won the silver medal. He then participated in the inaugural Olympic dual moguls on February 15, 2026, the ninth day of the Games. Canada had not won a gold medal through the first eight days, the longest span without one since 1988, attracting increasing national consternation. Kingsbury reached the dual moguls final, where he defeated Japan's Ikuma Horishima to take Canada's first gold medal in 2026. He hailed the result as "one of the best days of my life."

== Results ==
=== Olympic results ===
Year	Moguls	Dual Moguls
2014 Sochi	2	—
2018 Pyeongchang	1	—
2022 Beijing	2	—
2026 Milano Cortina	2	1

=== World Championship results ===
Date	Location	Discipline	Event	Result
February 2, 2011	Deer Valley, Utah, United States	Moguls	2011 Freestyle World Championships	Bronze
February 5, 2011	Deer Valley, Utah, United States	Dual Moguls	2011 Freestyle World Championships	Silver
March 6, 2013	Voss-Myrdalen, Norway	Moguls	2013 Freestyle World Championships	Gold
March 8, 2013	Voss-Myrdalen, Norway	Dual Moguls	2013 Freestyle World Championships	Silver
January 18, 2015	Kreischberg, Austria	Moguls	2015 Freestyle World Championships	Silver
January 19, 2015	Kreischberg, Austria	Dual Moguls	2015 Freestyle World Championships	Gold
March 8, 2017	Sierra Nevada, Spain	Moguls	2017 Freestyle World Championships	Bronze
March 9, 2017	Sierra Nevada, Spain	Dual Moguls	2017 Freestyle World Championships	13th
February 8, 2019	Deer Valley, Utah, United States	Moguls	2019 Freestyle World Championships	Gold
February 8, 2019	Deer Valley, Utah, United States	Dual Moguls	2019 Freestyle World Championships	Gold
March 8, 2021	Almaty, Kazakhstan	Moguls	2021 Freestyle World Championships	Gold
March 9, 2021	Almaty, Kazakhstan	Dual Moguls	2021 Freestyle World Championships	Gold
February 25, 2023	Bakuriani, Georgia	Moguls	2023 Freestyle World Championships	Gold
February 26, 2023	Bakuriani, Georgia	Dual Moguls	2023 Freestyle World Championships	Gold
March 19, 2025	Engadin, Switzerland	Moguls	2025 Freestyle World Championships	Silver
March 21, 2025	Engadin, Switzerland	Dual Moguls	2025 Freestyle World Championships	Gold

=== World Cup results by season ===
Season	Events Started	Best Finish	Wins	Podiums	Overall Moguls		Overall Freestyle skiing		Moguls		Dual Mogul's	
Season	Events Started	Best Finish	Wins	Podiums	Points	Rank	Points	Rank	Points	Rank	Points	Rank
2009–10	5/10	4	0	0	116	22	11.6	64	N/A			
2010–11	11/11	1	2	8	725	3rd place, bronze medalist(s)	65.9	4	N/A			
2011–12	13/13	1	8	13	1180	1st place, gold medalist(s)	90.8	1st place, gold medalist(s)	N/A			
2012–13	12/12	1	6	9	940	1st place, gold medalist(s)	78.3	1st place, gold medalist(s)	N/A			
2013–14	11/11	1	5	9	890	1st place, gold medalist(s)	80.9	1st place, gold medalist(s)	N/A			
2014–15	9/9	1	7	7	761	1st place, gold medalist(s)	84.6	1st place, gold medalist(s)	N/A			
2015–16	8/8	1	5	7	705	1st place, gold medalist(s)	88.1	1st place, gold medalist(s)	N/A			
2016–17	11/11	1	9	10	1020	1st place, gold medalist(s)	92.7	1st place, gold medalist(s)	N/A			
2017–18	10/10	1	7	10	940	1st place, gold medalist(s)	94.0	1st place, gold medalist(s)	N/A			
2018–19	9/9	1	7	8	825	1st place, gold medalist(s)	91.7	1st place, gold medalist(s)	N/A			
2019–20	10/10	1	7	10	940	1st place, gold medalist(s)	94.0	1st place, gold medalist(s)	N/A			
2020–21	2/5	1	2	2	200	6	N/A		N/A			
2021–22	12/12	1	9	11	1072	1st place, gold medalist(s)	N/A		672	1st place, gold medalist(s)	400	1st place, gold medalist(s)
2022–23	12/12	1	6	11	1002	1st place, gold medalist(s)	N/A		540	1st place, gold medalist(s)	462	1st place, gold medalist(s)
2023–24	16/16	1	10	14	1300	1st place, gold medalist(s)	N/A		600	2nd place, silver medalist(s)	700	1st place, gold medalist(s)
2024–25	16/16	1	9	13	1299	1st place, gold medalist(s)	N/A		755	1st place, gold medalist(s)	544	1st place, gold medalist(s)

=== World Cup victories ===
Kingsbury has achieved 100 victories in the FIS Freestyle Ski World Cup.

No.	Date	Location	Discipline
1	December 21, 2010	Beida Lake, China	Moguls
2	January 29, 2011	Calgary, Canada	Moguls
3	December 10, 2011	Ruka, Finland	Moguls
4	December 20, 2011	Meribel, France	Dual Moguls
5	January 14, 2012	Mont Gabriel, Canada	Dual Moguls
6	January 19, 2012	Lake Placid, United States	Moguls
7	January 28, 2012	Calgary, Canada	Moguls
8	February 2, 2012	Deer Valley, United States	Moguls
9	February 12, 2012	Beida Lake, China	Moguls
10	February 18, 2012	Naeba, Japan	Moguls
11	December 15, 2012	Ruka, Finland	Dual Moguls
12	January 17, 2013	Lake Placid, United States	Moguls
13	January 26, 2013	Calgary, Canada	Moguls
14	January 31, 2013	Deer Valley, United States	Moguls
15	February 15, 2013	Sochi, Russia	Moguls
16	February 23, 2013	Inawashiro, Japan	Moguls
17	December 14, 2013	Ruka, Finland	Moguls
18	January 4, 2014	Calgary, Canada	Moguls
19	January 9, 2014	Deer Valley, United States	Moguls
20	March 2, 2014	Inawashiro, Japan	Dual Moguls
21	March 16, 2014	Voss, Norway	Dual Moguls
22	January 3, 2015	Calgary, Canada	Moguls
23	January 9, 2015	Deer Valley, United States	Moguls
24	January 10, 2015	Deer Valley, United States	Dual Moguls
25	January 29, 2015	Lake Placid, United States	Moguls
26	February 7, 2015	Val St. Come, Quebec, Canada	Moguls
27	February 28, 2015	Tazawako, Japan	Moguls
28	March 1, 2015	Tazawako, Japan	Dual Moguls
29	December 12, 2015	Ruka, Finland	Dual Moguls
30	January 23, 2016	Val St. Come, Canada	Moguls
31	January 30, 2016	Calgary, Canada	Moguls
32	February 28, 2016	Tazawako, Japan	Dual Moguls
33	March 5, 2016	Moscow, Russia	Dual Moguls
34	December 10, 2016	Ruka, Finland	Moguls
35	January 21, 2017	Val St. Come, Canada	Moguls
36	February 2, 2017	Deer Valley, United States	Moguls
37	February 4, 2017	Deer Valley, United States	Dual Moguls
38	February 11, 2017	Phoenix Park Pyeongchang, South Korea	Moguls
39	February 18, 2017	Tazawako, Japan	Moguls
40	February 19, 2017	Tazawako, Japan	Dual Moguls
41	February 25, 2017	Thaiwoo, China	Moguls
42	February 26, 2017	Thaiwoo, China	Dual Moguls
43	December 9, 2017	Ruka, Finland	Moguls
44	December 21, 2017	Thaiwoo, China	Moguls
45	December 22, 2017	Thaiwoo, China	Moguls
46	January 6, 2018	Calgary, Canada	Moguls
47	January 10, 2018	Deer Valley, United States	Moguls
48	January 11, 2018	Deer Valley, United States	Moguls
49	March 18, 2018	Megève, France	Dual Moguls
50	December 7, 2018	Ruka, Finland	Moguls
51	December 15, 2018	Thaiwoo, China	Moguls
52	December 16, 2018	Thaiwoo, China	Dual Moguls
53	January 12, 2019	Calgary, Canada	Moguls
54	January 26, 2019	Mont Tremblant, Canada	Moguls
55	February 23, 2019	Tazawako, Japan	Moguls
56	February 24, 2019	Tazawako, Japan	Dual Moguls
57	December 7, 2019	Ruka, Finland	Moguls
58	December 15, 2019	Thaiwoo, China	Dual Moguls
59	January 25, 2020	Mont Tremblant, Canada	Moguls
60	February 1, 2020	Calgary, Canada	Moguls
61	February 8, 2020	Deer Valley, United States	Dual Moguls
62	February 22, 2020	Tazawako, Japan	Moguls
63	March 7, 2020	Krasnoyarsk, Russia	Dual Moguls
64	February 4, 2021	Deer Valley, United States	Moguls
65	February 5, 2021	Deer Valley, United States	Dual Moguls
66	December 4, 2021	Ruka, Finland	Moguls
67	December 12, 2021	Idre, Sweden	Dual Moguls
68	December 18, 2021	Alpe d'Huez, France	Dual Moguls
69	January 7, 2022	Mont Tremblant, Canada	Moguls
70	January 8, 2022	Mont Tremblant, Canada	Moguls
71	January 13, 2022	Deer Valley, United States	Moguls
72	March 12, 2022	Chiesa in Valmalenco, Italy	Dual Moguls
73	March 18, 2022	Megève, France	Moguls
74	March 19, 2022	Megève, France	Dual Moguls
75	December 3, 2022	Ruka, Finland	Moguls
76	December 11, 2022	Idre, Sweden	Dual Moguls
77	January 27, 2023	Val St. Come, Canada	Moguls
78	February 4, 2023	Deer Valley, United States	Dual Moguls
79	March 17, 2023	Almaty, Kazakhstan	Moguls
80	March 18, 2023	Almaty, Kazakhstan	Dual Moguls
81	December 8, 2023	Idre, Sweden	Moguls
82	December 9, 2023	Idre, Sweden	Dual Moguls
83	December 15, 2023	Alpe d'Huez, France	Moguls
84	December 23, 2023	Bakuriani, Georgia	Dual Moguls
85	January 20, 2024	Val St. Come, Canada	Dual Moguls
86	January 27, 2024	Waterville, United States	Dual Moguls
87	February 1, 2024	Deer Valley, United States	Moguls
88	March 8, 2024	Almaty, Kazakhstan	Moguls
89	March 9, 2024	Almaty, Kazakhstan	Dual Moguls
90	March 16, 2024	Chiesa in Valmalenco, Italy	Dual Moguls
91	November 30, 2024	Ruka, Finland	Moguls
92	December 6, 2024	Idre, Sweden	Moguls
93	January 24, 2025	Waterville, United States	Moguls
94	January 25, 2025	Waterville, United States	Dual Moguls
95	January 31, 2025	Val St. Come, Canada	Moguls
96	February 1, 2025	Val St. Come, Canada	Dual Moguls
97	February 28, 2025	Almaty, Kazakhstan	Moguls
98	March 1, 2025	Almaty, Kazakhstan	Dual Moguls
99	March 12, 2025	Livigno, Italy	Dual Moguls
100	January 10, 2026	Val St. Côme, Canada	Dual Moguls

Olympic Games
Preceded by Maude Charron; Andre De Grasse	Flagbearer for Canada; 2026 Milano Cortina (with Marielle Thompson)	Next: Most recent
