= Alexandre Bilodeau =

Canadian freestyle skier (born 1987)

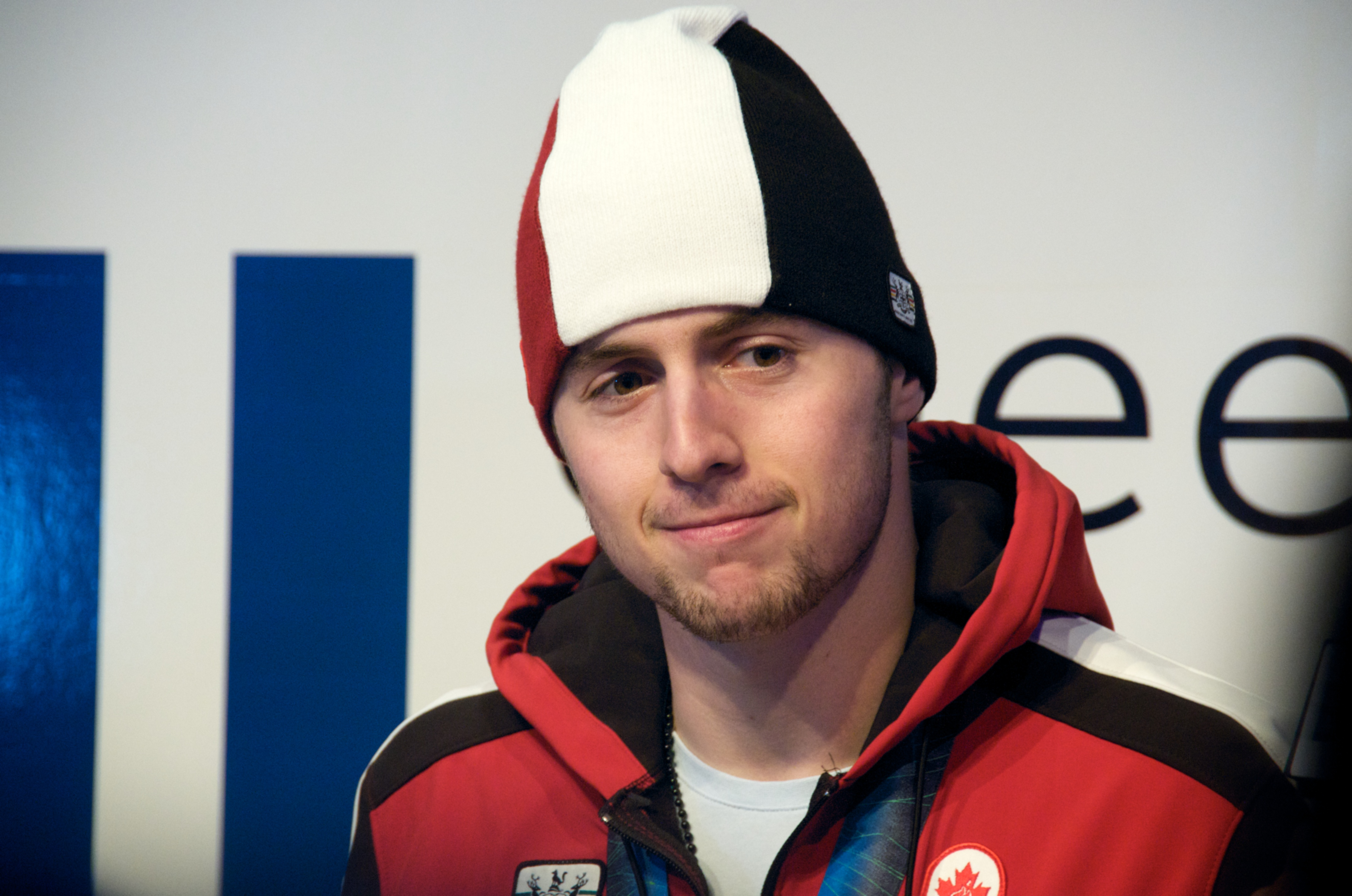
- Bilodeau in 2010

Personal information
- Born: September 8, 1987 (age 39) Montreal, Quebec, Canada
- Height: 1.73 m (5 ft 8 in)
- Website: Official site

Skiing career
- Sport: Alpine skiing
- World Cup debut: December 14, 2005 (age 18)

Olympics
- Teams: 3 (2006–2014)
- Medals: 2 (2 gold)

World Championships
- Teams: 4 (2007–2013)
- Medals: 5 (3 gold)

World Cup
- Seasons: 9 (2006–2014)
- Wins: 19
- Podiums: 48
- Overall titles: 1 (2009)
- Discipline titles: 1: moguls (2009)
Medal record
International freestyle ski competitions
Event	1st	2nd	3rd
Olympic Games	2	0	0
World Championships	3	2	0
Total	5	2	0
Men's freestyle skiing
Representing Canada
Olympic Games
Gold medal – first place	2010 Vancouver	Moguls
Gold medal – first place	2014 Sochi	Moguls
World Championships
Gold medal – first place	2009 Inawashiro	Dual moguls
Gold medal – first place	2011 Deer Valley	Dual moguls
Gold medal – first place	2013 Voss	Dual moguls
Silver medal – second place	2011 Deer Valley	Moguls
Silver medal – second place	2013 Voss	Moguls

Alexandre Bilodeau (French pronunciation: [alɛksɑ̃dʁ(ə) bilɔdo]; born September 8, 1987) is a Canadian retired freestyle skier from Rosemère, Quebec, who currently resides in Montreal.

Bilodeau won a gold medal in the men's moguls at the 2010 Winter Olympics in Vancouver, becoming the first Canadian to win a gold medal at an Olympic Games held in Canada. At the 2014 Winter Olympics, he became the first Olympian in history to defend his gold medal in any freestyle skiing event as well as the first Canadian to defend an individual title since Catriona Le May Doan at the 2002 Winter Olympics. Bilodeau is a three-time FIS World Champion in dual moguls, and is also a two-time Worlds silver medallist in moguls. He was the FIS World Cup champion for the 2008–09 season winning the moguls and overall freestyle skiing title that season. In his final World Cup race, he retired with a win, and in doing so, surpassed Jean-Luc Brassard for the most World Cup medals by a Canadian.

== Career ==
In 2006, Bilodeau finished 12th at the Olympics and later in the world cup season he became the youngest athlete in history to win a World Cup moguls event. In the 2005–06 overall World Cup standings he managed to finish second and won the FIS rookie of the year title. In February 2009, he won four straight World Cup events and was part of two Canadian sweeps of the men's podium in moguls. He achieved this together with Vincent Marquis and Pierre-Alexandre Rousseau. Following these victories Bilodeau clinched the 2009 overall moguls title on February 20. At the 2009 Freestyle World Championships he finished eighth in the moguls event and followed that by winning gold in the dual moguls.

=== 2010 Winter Olympics ===
Bilodeau was a member of the Canadian moguls team going to the 2010 Winter Olympics in Vancouver. He started the competition on Sunday, February 14 in favourable conditions. This was in contrast to the previous day for the women in which they skied in rain, sleet, and generally slushy conditions. Bilodeau finished the qualification run in 2nd place overall. In the final run, Bilodeau threw a back double full on the first jump and followed it with a back iron cross on the second. His jump and style scores combined with the second fastest run of the night, saw him scoring 26.75 points to win the gold. With the gold he became the first Canadian to win a gold medal during a Canadian-hosted Olympics.

The gold medal victory elicited celebrations across Vancouver and Canada. Canadians celebrated around the Vancouver Olympic cauldron and crowds spilled onto Robson Street in downtown Vancouver waving the flag and singing the Canadian national anthem. 22,000 people entered BC Place Stadium the next day to witness his medal presentation. Following his Olympic medal Bilodeau together with Jennifer Heil made a $25,000 donation to charity. Bilodeau chose to give his to Canadian Association of Pediatric Health Centres for cerebral palsy. Bilodeau and Heil encouraged others to give to charity saying that they have the ability to give back and if others were to help in their own way it would make a difference.

Bilodeau's victory over Dale Begg-Smith at the Olympics lead to some complaints about biased-judging from members of the Australian coaching staff. The Australian coaches were also critical of the judging in the women's aerials event. They called into question the system for training judges, and suggested that judges for big events should be ex-athletes from the sport being competed.

=== Kingsbury rivalry ===
Bilodeau did not win a World Cup event during the 2009–10 season and finished fourth in the World Cup standings with 347 points, behind winner Dale Begg-Smith, who accumulated 693 points. The following season, Bilodeau finished on the podium several times leading up to the World Championships. At the Worlds, Bilodeau won the silver medal in the moguls event, finishing ahead of countryman Mikaël Kingsbury. Bilodeau would next compete in the dual moguls event at the World Championships. He advanced through to final where he found himself competing head-to-head with Kingsbury. Bilodeau went on to win the gold and defend his world title in the dual moguls event after Kingsbury fell navigating the moguls.

He confirmed at the TV show "Droit au but" that the 2014 Olympics would be his last. He had taken time away from the sport to focus on his studies for an accounting career at Concordia University. Bilodeau had a lot to say about the potential retirement commenting "Right now, I'm struggling a little bit with the results, but my skiing is there — I'm a better skier than I've ever been. I'm not in a rush. I know it's a process to get to Sochi, and that's my goal. It's going to be one of the last races of my career and of my life, so I think what's important is to have fun. I thought before 2010 I was retiring, I was doing the 2011 season and then retiring the year after. And then through 2011, I was like, 'Will I regret it? Will I regret it to not try to defend my medal? I think it's a great challenge".

At the 2013 World Championships Bilodeau placed second behind the upcoming Kingsbury who won his first World Championship. Bilodeau then went on to compete in the dual moguls final. There he would go up against a familiar foe in teammate Kingsbury, he would defeat him there in the final and achieving his third consecutive title as World Champion in dual moguls.

=== 2014 Winter Olympics ===
Much of the World Cup season building to the Olympics saw Bilodeau seesawing with teammate Kingsbury, with the younger skier getting the better of Bilodeau on top of the podium more often as the duo repeatedly placed one-two. This battle continued at the 2014 Winter Olympics where Bilodeau managed to beat out his counterpart after Kingsbury made a few slight errors in his final run. Yet once again the two men placed first and second and with the win Bilodeau became the first freestyle skiing gold medallist to defend his Olympic title, and first repeat gold medallist. He became the first Canadian to defend their Olympic gold since Catriona Le May Doan repeated her gold medal performance at the 2002 Salt Lake City Olympics in Utah. Le May Doan had been the first Canadian to repeat gold, Bilodeau became the second to do so, and the first male.

=== Retirement ===
On March 21, 2014, Bilodeau announced he would retire after the 2013–14 FIS Freestyle Skiing World Cup season.

== Honours ==
In 2012 Bilodeau was awarded the Queen Elizabeth II Diamond Jubilee Medal. Bilodeau was later awarded the Medal of Honour by the National Assembly of Quebec in 2017. In 2019, Bilodeau was awarded the Order of Sport, marking his induction into Canada's Sports Hall of Fame.

== Personal life ==
Bilodeau is the son of Serge Bilodeau and Sylvie Michaud. His older brother, Frédéric, was diagnosed with cerebral palsy at a young age and told that he would be unable to walk by the time he was 12. Frédéric is now age 28 and still has the ability to walk. He also has a younger sister, Béatrice who was also a mogul skier on the Canadian national team. As a child, Bilodeau was an avid hockey player. However, his mother got tired of taking Frédéric, their sister Béatrice and him from one rink to another for hockey games, and instead she encouraged him to sign up for downhill skiing. That decision came shortly after Bilodeau saw Jean-Luc Brassard win Olympic gold in moguls at the 1994 Winter Olympics in Lillehammer, Norway. So at the age of seven, he decided to quit hockey and try moguls. Bilodeau remains an avid hockey player, albeit recreationally.

Bilodeau graduated from the Collège Jean-Eudes, a French-language high school in Montreal where he studied sciences. In 2014, it was reported that Bilodeau was studying accounting at the John Molson School of Business of Concordia University.

Bilodeau says that his heroes are his brother Frédéric and Canadian freestyle skier Jean-Luc Brassard. In his free time, he enjoys skiing and playing the piano. Bilodeau speaks fluent French and English.

Bilodeau was a presenter at the 2010 Juno Awards, presenting the award for Album of the Year to Michael Bublé.

After his retirement, he announced his plans to become an accountant.

== Results ==
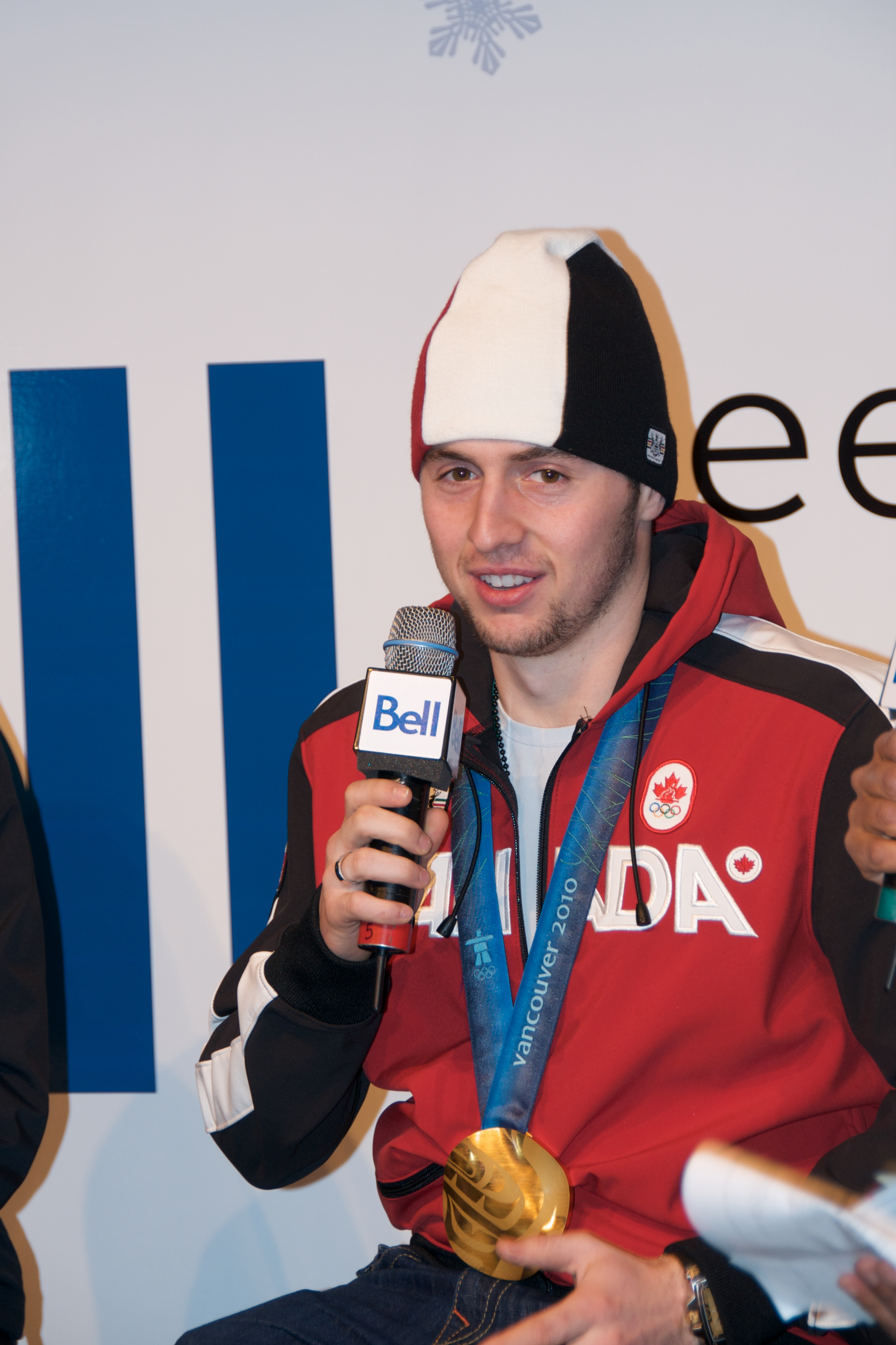
Alexandre Bilodeau with his 2010 Winter Olympics gold medal

=== Olympic results ===
Date	Games	Location	Discipline	Results	Notes
February 15, 2006	2006 Torino Olympics	Sauze d'Oulx	Men's moguls	12th	
February 14, 2010	2010 Vancouver Olympics	Cypress Mountain	Men's moguls	Gold	
February 10, 2014	2014 Sochi Olympics	Rosa Khutor Extreme Park	Men's moguls	Gold	

=== World Cup results ===
Tournament	Discipline	Events participated	Best finish	Wins	Podiums	Points	Final position
2005-06	Moguls	11/11	1	2	3	506	2
2006-07	Moguls	7/7	2	0	4	408	3
2006-07	Dual moguls	3/3	4	0	0	226	4
2007-08	Moguls	10/11	2	0	4	402	4
2008-09	Moguls	9/9	1	5	8	790	1
2009-10	Moguls	8/10	2	0	3	347	4
2010-11	Moguls	11/11	1	4	7	739	2
2011-12	Moguls	4/13	2	0	1	170	17
2012-13	Moguls	12/12	1	4	9	893	2
2013-14	Moguls	11/11	1	4	9	879	2
2005-06	Overall	N/A	N/A	N/A	N/A	46	6
2006-07	Overall	N/A	N/A	N/A	N/A	41	7
2007-08	Overall	N/A	N/A	N/A	N/A	40	12
2008-09	Overall	N/A	N/A	N/A	N/A	88	1
2009-10	Overall	N/A	N/A	N/A	N/A	35	12
2010-11	Overall	N/A	N/A	N/A	N/A	67	3
2011-12	Overall	N/A	N/A	N/A	N/A	13	71
2012-13	Overall	N/A	N/A	N/A	N/A	74	2
2013-14	Overall	N/A	N/A	N/A	N/A	80	2

=== World Cup victories ===
Date	Location	Discipline
January 7, 2006	Mont Gabriel, Canada	Moguls
February 4, 2006	Špindlerův Mlýn, Czech Republic	Moguls
February 7, 2009	Cypress Mountain, Canada	Moguls
February 13, 2009	Åre, Sweden	Moguls
February 14, 2009	Åre, Sweden	Dual moguls
February 20, 2009	Voss-Myrdalen, Norway	Moguls
March 18, 2009	La Plagne, France	Moguls
January 15, 2011	Mont Gabriel, Canada	Moguls
February 26, 2011	Mariánské Lázně, Czech Republic	Dual moguls
March 11, 2011	Åre, Sweden	Moguls
March 12, 2011	Åre, Sweden	Dual moguls
February 2, 2013	Deer Valley, United States	Dual moguls
March 15, 2013	Åre, Sweden	Moguls
March 16, 2013	Åre, Sweden	Dual moguls
March 22, 2013	Sierra Nevada, Spain	Dual moguls
January 11, 2014	Deer Valley, United States	Moguls
January 15, 2014	Lake Placid, United States	Moguls
January 19, 2014	Val Saint-Côme, Canada	Moguls
March 21, 2014	La Plagne, France	Dual moguls

=== World Championship results ===
Date	Location	Discipline	Event	Result
March 9, 2007	Madonna di Campiglio, Italy	Moguls	2007 Freestyle World Championships	14th
March 10, 2007	Madonna di Campiglio, Italy	Dual moguls	2007 Freestyle World Championships	5th
March 7, 2009	Inawashiro, Japan	Moguls	2009 Freestyle World Championships	8th
March 8, 2009	Inawashiro, Japan	Dual moguls	2009 Freestyle World Championships	Gold
February 2, 2011	Deer Valley, United States	Moguls	2011 Freestyle World Championships	Silver
February 5, 2011	Deer Valley, United States	Dual moguls	2011 Freestyle World Championships	Gold
March 6, 2013	Voss-Myrdalen, Norway	Moguls	2013 Freestyle World Championships	Silver
March 8, 2013	Voss-Myrdalen, Norway	Dual moguls	2013 Freestyle World Championships	Gold
