= Aleksey Pavlenko =

Aleksey Pavlenko may refer to:

- Aleksey Pavlenko (skier) (born 1995), Russian freestyle skier
- Oleksiy Pavlenko (born 1977), Ukrainian businessman and politician
