= Andrey Volkov =

Andrey Volkov may refer to:

- Andrey Volkov (skier)
- Andrey Volkov (judoka)
