= Vaculík =

Vaculík (feminine Vaculíková) is a Czech surname, an archaic diminutive of the name Václav. Notable people include:

- Kristina Vaculik, Canadian artistic gymnast;
- Ludvík Vaculík, Czech writer and journalist;
- Lukáš Vaculík (actor), Czech actor;
- Lukáš Vaculík (footballer), Czech footballer;
- Lukáš Vaculík (skier), Czech skier;
- Martin Vaculík, Slovak speedway rider;
- Ondřej Vaculík, Czech ski-jumper;
- Richie Vaculik, Australian mixed martial artist;
- Tereza Vaculíková, Czech freestyle skier.
