= Aleksey Pavlenko (skier) =

Russian freestyle skier

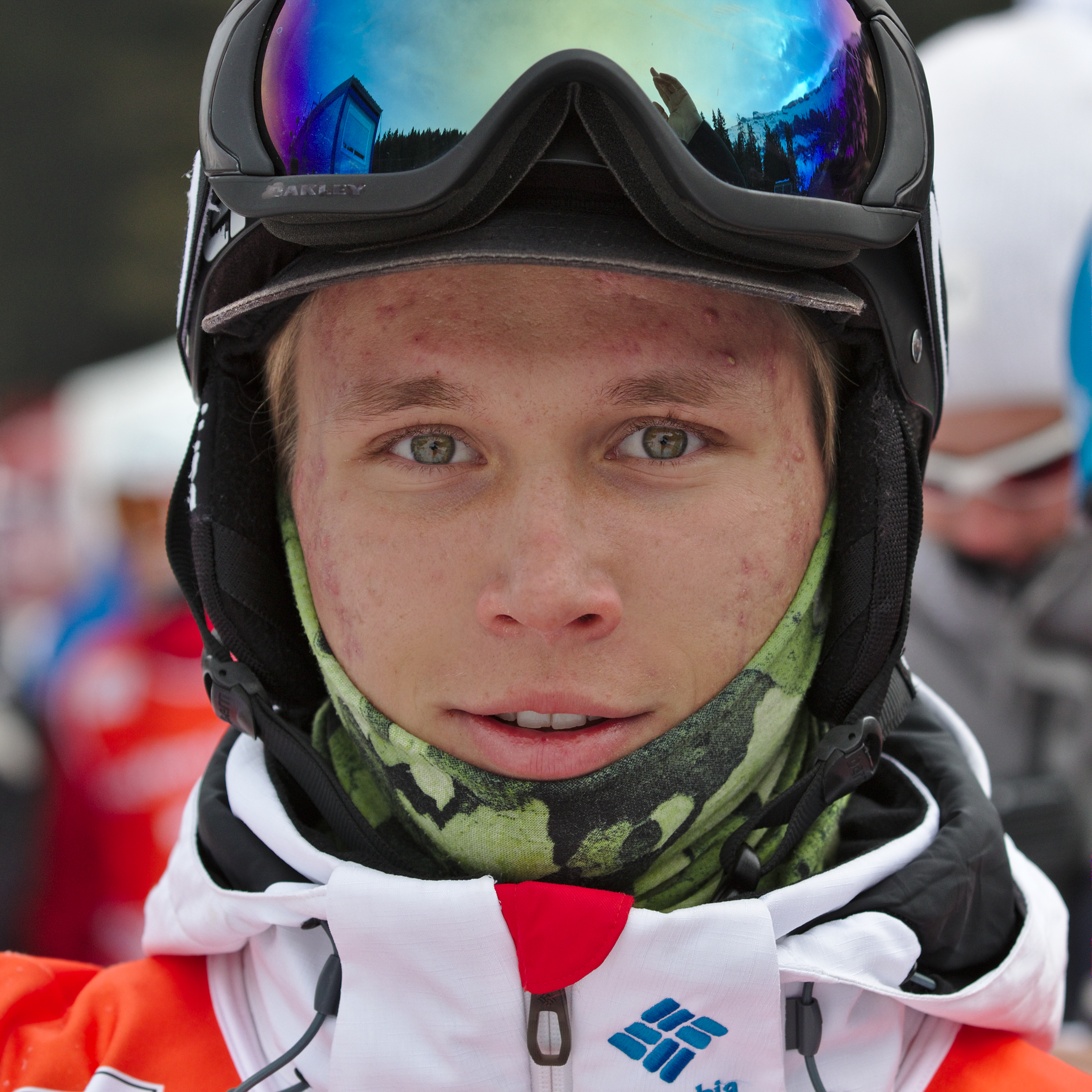

Personal information
- Born: March 6, 1995 (age 31) St. Petersburg, Russia

Sport
- Sport: Skiing

Aleksey Pavlenko (born March 6, 1995, in St. Petersburg) is a Russian freestyle skier, specializing in moguls.

Pavlenko competed at the 2014 Winter Olympics for Russia. He placed 12th in the first qualifying round in the moguls, not advancing. He then finished 6th in the second qualifying round, moving on to the final. In the first run of the final, he placed 16th, failing to advance to the medal round.

Pavlenko made his World Cup debut in December 2012. As of April 2014, his best World Cup finish is 11th, in a moguls event at Inawashiro in 2013–14. His best World Cup overall finish in moguls is 41st, in 2013–14.
