= Heidi Kloser =

American freestyle skier

Personal information
- Born: Heidi L Kloser; September 18, 1992 (age 33) Vail, Colorado
- Height: 5 ft 7 in (170 cm)
- Weight: 130 lb (59 kg)

Sport
- Country: United States
- Sport: Freestyle skiing
Medal record
Representing United States

Heidi L Kloser (born September 18, 1992) is an American freestyle skier noted for mogul skiing. She was once named FIS World Cup women’s moguls Rookie of the Year and she qualified to compete in Women's moguls at the 2014 Winter Olympics. However an injury during a training run forced her to withdraw from competition.
