= Denis Dolgodvorov =

Russian freestyle skier

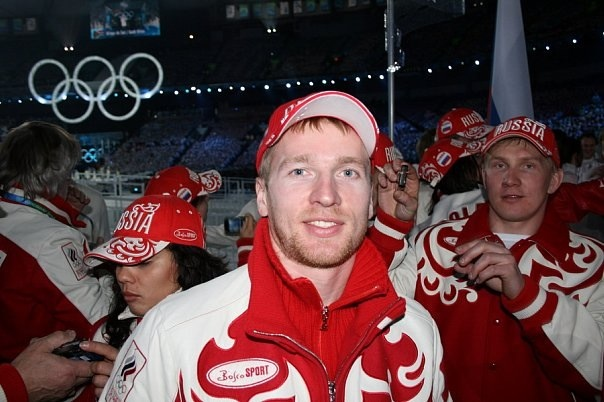

Personal information
- Born: May 1, 1982 (age 44) Tomsk, Russian SSR, Soviet Union

Sport
- Sport: Skiing
- Updated on March 2, 2013

Denis Dolgodvorov (born May 1, 1982 in Tomsk) is a Russian freestyle skier, specializing in moguls.

Dolgodvorov competed at the 2010 Winter Olympics for Russia. He qualified for the moguls final, finishing 13th. As of February 2013, his best showing at the World Championships is 18th, in 2005 and 2007. Dolgodvorov made his World Cup debut in December 2003. As of February 2013, his best performance at a World Cup event is 4th, achieved twice at moguls events. His best World Cup overall finish is 13th, in 2009/10.
