= Ville Miettunen =

Finnish freestyle skier

Personal information
- Born: 31 October 1992 (age 33) Keminmaa, Finland

Sport
- Sport: Skiing

Ville Miettunen (born 31 October 1992 in Keminmaa) is a Finnish freestyle skier, specializing in moguls.

Miettunen competed at the 2014 Winter Olympics for Finland. He failed to finish in the first qualifying round in the moguls, not advancing.

As of April 2014, his best showing at the World Championships is 8th, in the 2011 moguls and dual moguls.

Miettunen made his World Cup debut in December 2009. As of April 2014, his best World Cup finish is 4th, in a moguls event at Val St. Come in 2013–14. His best World Cup overall finish in moguls is 19th, in 2011–12.
