= Arnaud Burille =

French freestyle skier

Personal information
- Born: August 11, 1988 (age 37) Sallanches, France

Sport
- Sport: Skiing
- Updated on March 2, 2013

Arnaud Burille (born August 11, 1988) is a French freestyle skier, specializing in moguls.

Burille competed at the 2010 Winter Olympics for France. He finished 22nd in the moguls event.

Burille made his World Cup debut in December 2007. As of February 2013, his best performance at a World Cup event is 6th, in the moguls event at Sierra Nevada in 2009/10. His best World Cup overall finish is 20th, in 2009/10.
