= Sam Hall (skier) =

Australian freestyle skier (born 1988)

Personal information
- Born: 28 December 1988 (age 37) Mona Vale, New South Wales, Australia
- Height: 5 ft 11 in (180 cm)
- Weight: 90 kg (198 lb)

Sport
- Country: Australia
- Sport: Freestyle skiing
- Event: Mogul skiing
Medal record
Representing Australia

Sam Hall (born 28 December 1988) is an Australian freestyle skier. He competed at the 2014 Winter Olympics in Sochi.
