= Choi Jae-woo =

South Korean freestyle skier (born 1994)

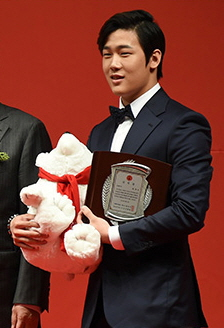

Korean name
- Hangul: 최재우
- Hanja: 崔載遇
- RR: Choe Jaeu
- MR: Ch'oe Chaeu

Choi Jae-woo (Korean: 최재우; born 27 February 1994) is a South Korean freestyle skier. He competed at the 2014 Winter Olympics.
