= Sergey Volkov (skier) =

Russian freestyle skier

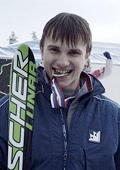

Personal information
- Born: December 6, 1987 (age 38) Chusovoy, Russian SSR, Soviet Union

Sport
- Sport: Skiing

World Cup career
- Indiv. podiums: 2
- Indiv. wins: 1
- Updated on March 15, 2013

Sergey Volkov (born December 6, 1987, in Chusovoy, Russian SSR, Soviet Union) is a Russian freestyle skier, specializing in moguls.

Volkov competed at the 2010 Winter Olympics for Russia. He did not advance to the moguls final, placing 28th in the qualifying round.

As of March 2013, his best showing at the World Championships is 6th in the 2011 dual moguls event.

Volkov made his World Cup debut in December 2009. His first career podium, a bronze in dual moguls at Mont Gabriel in 2011/12, was followed a month later by his first win, in the same event at Deer Valley. As of March 2013, those are his best World Cup performances. His best World Cup overall finish is 6th, in 2011/12.

== World Cup podiums ==
| Date | Location | Rank | Event |
| January 14, 2012 | Mont Gabriel | 3rd place, bronze medalist(s) | Dual moguls |
| February 4, 2012 | Deer Valley | 1st place, gold medalist(s) | Dual moguls |
