= Giacomo Matiz =

Italian freestyle skier

Personal information
- Born: January 10, 1986 (age 40) Gemona del Friuli, Italy

Sport
- Sport: Skiing

Giacomo Matiz (born January 10, 1986, in Gemona del Friuli) is an Italian freestyle skier, specializing in moguls.

Matiz competed at the 2014 Winter Olympics for Italy. He placed 14th in the first qualifying round in the moguls, not advancing. He then finished 11th in the second qualifying round, again failing to advance.

As of April 2014, his best showing at the World Championships is 14th, in the 2009 dual moguls.

Matiz made his World Cup debut in February 2005. As of April 2014, his best World Cup finish is 8th, in a moguls event at Beida Lake in 2011–12. His best World Cup overall finish in moguls is 27th, in 2012–13.
