= Jussi Penttala =

Finnish freestyle skier (born 1993)

Personal information
- Born: 9 October 1993 (age 32) Helsinki, Finland

Sport
- Sport: Skiing

Jussi Penttala (born 9 October 1993 in Helsinki) is a Finnish freestyle skier, specializing in moguls.

Penttala competed at the 2014 Winter Olympics for Finland. He placed 23rd in the first qualifying round in the moguls, not advancing. He then failed to finish in the second qualifying round, again failing to advance.

As of April 2014, his best showing at the World Championships was 16th place, in the 2011 moguls.

Penttala made his World Cup debut in December 2009. As of April 2014, his best World Cup finish is 6th, in a dual moguls event at Are in 2011–12. His best World Cup overall finish in moguls is 27th, in 2011–12.
