= Vinjar Slåtten =

Norwegian freestyle skier

Personal information
- Born: 16 July 1990 (age 35) Voss Municipality, Norway

Sport
- Country: Norway
- Sport: Freestyle skiing
- Event: Moguls

Vinjar Slåtten (born 16 July 1990) is a Norwegian freestyle skier.

He competed in the 2018 Winter Olympics in Pyeongchang, finishing 6th in the Mens Freestyle moguls event.

He competed at the FIS Freestyle Ski and Snowboarding World Championships 2017, where he placed 7th in men's moguls. He also have a podium finish in the Deer Valley World Cup.
