= Andrey Volkov (skier) =

Russian freestyle skier

Personal information
- Born: May 22, 1986 (age 40) Chusovoy, Russian SSR, Soviet Union

Sport
- Sport: Skiing

World Cup career
- Indiv. podiums: 1
- Updated on March 2, 2013

Andrey Volkov (born May 22, 1986) is a Russian freestyle skier, specializing in moguls.

Volkov competed at the 2010 Winter Olympics for Russia. He did not advance to the moguls final, placing 25th in the qualifying round.

As of February 2013, his best showing at the World Championships came in 2009, where he finished 9th in the dual moguls event.

Volkov made his World Cup debut in December 2003. As of February 2013, he has won one World Cup medal, a bronze in the dual moguls at Deer Valley in 2011/12. His best World Cup overall finish is 15th, in 2004/05.

== World Cup podiums ==
| Date | Location | Rank | Event |
| February 4, 2012 | Deer Valley | 3rd place, bronze medalist(s) | Dual moguls |
