= Arttu Kiramo =

Finnish freestyle skier

Personal information
- Born: 15 April 1990 (age 36) Jyväskylä, Finland

Sport
- Sport: Skiing
- Updated on 2 March 2013

Arttu Kiramo (born 15 April 1990 in Jyväskylä) is a Finnish freestyle skier, specializing in moguls.

Kiramo competed at the 2010 Winter Olympics for Finland. He qualified for the moguls final, finishing 16th.

As of February 2013, his best showing at the World Championships came in 2011, placing 7th in the dual moguls event.

Kiramo made his World Cup debut in March 2007. As of February 2013, his best performance at a World Cup event is 8th, achieved at two moguls events in 2010/11 and 2011/12. His best World Cup overall finish is 18th, in 2010/11 and 2011/12.
