= Sho Endo =

Japanese freestyle skier (born 1990)

Personal information
- Born: July 4, 1990 (age 36) Inawashiro, Fukushima, Japan
- Height: 1.78 m (5 ft 10 in)

Sport
- Sport: Skiing
- Updated on March 2, 2013

Sho Endo (遠藤 尚, Endō Shō; born July 4, 1990 in Inawashiro, Fukushima) is a Japanese freestyle skier.

Endo competed in moguls, at the 2010 Winter Olympics. He qualified for the moguls final and finished 7th.

As of February 2013, his best showing at the World Championships came in 2011, placing 21st, in the moguls event.

He made his World Cup debut in December 2007. As of February 2013, he has twice won bronze medals in World Cup moguls events, including his first medal at Åre in 2011/12. His best World Cup finish is 8th, also in 2011/12.

== World Cup podiums ==
Date	Location	Rank
March 9, 2012	Åre	3rd place, bronze medalist(s)
January 26, 2013	Calgary	3rd place, bronze medalist(s)
