= Nobuyuki Nishi =

Japanese freestyle skier (born 1985)

Medal record

Men's Freestyle skiing

Representing Japan

FIS Freestyle World Ski Championships
Silver medal – second place	2009 Inawashiro	Dual moguls
Bronze medal – third place	2011 Deer Valley	Dual moguls

Nobuyuki Nishi (西 伸幸, Nishi Nobuyuki; born in Kawasaki, Kanagawa on July 13, 1985) is a Japanese freestyle skier active since 2003 who represented Japan at the 2010 Winter Olympics. Nishi won a bronze medal in dual moguls at the 2011 FIS Freestyle World Ski Championships.
