= Anthony Benna =

French freestyle skier

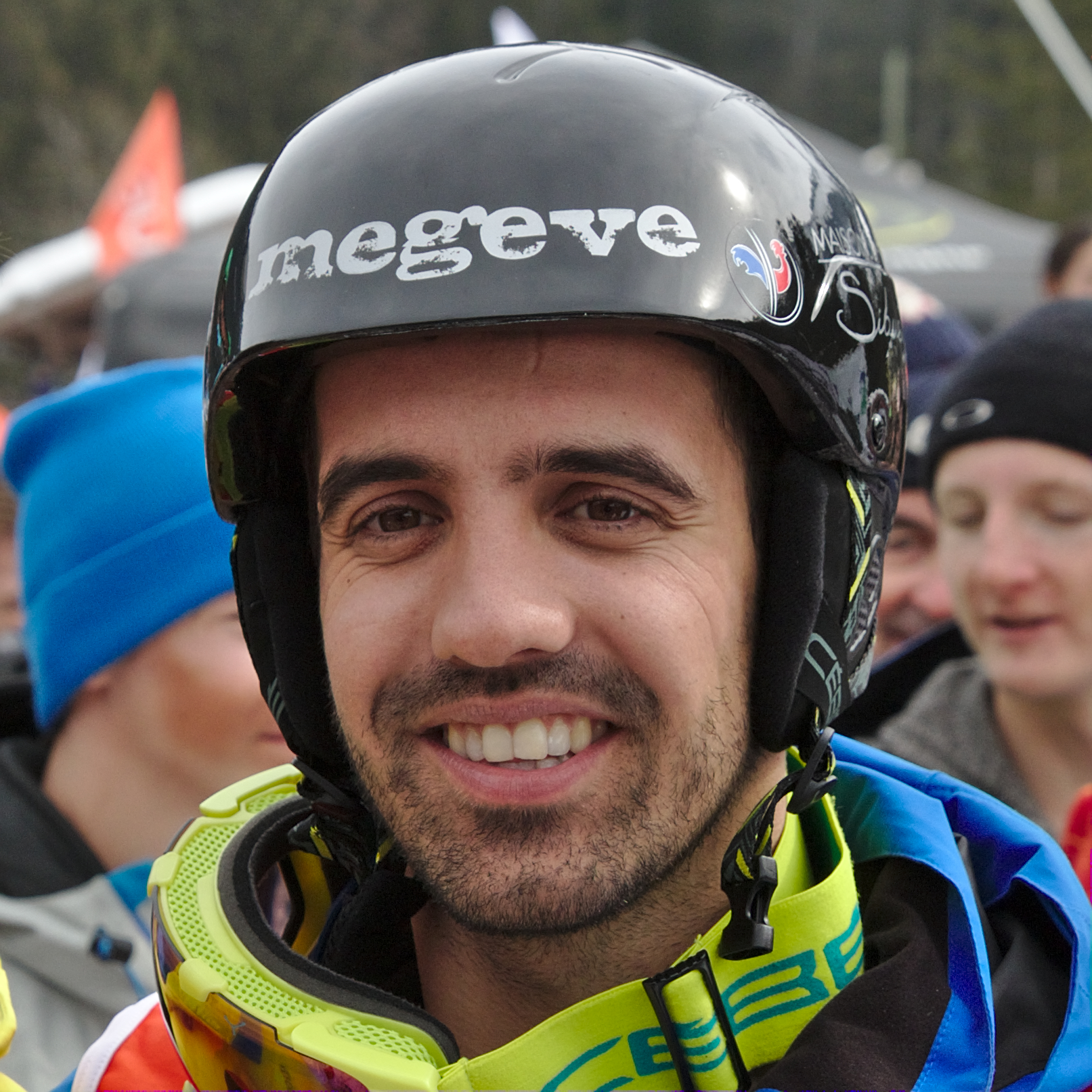

Personal information
- Born: 25 September 1987 (age 38) Cluses, France

Sport
- Sport: Skiing

World Cup career
- Indiv. podiums: 4
Medal record
Representing France
Men's Freestyle skiing
World Championships
Gold medal – first place	2015 Kreischberg	Moguls
- Updated on 28 January 2015

Anthony Benna (born 25 September 1987) is a French freestyle skier, specializing in moguls.

Benna competed at the 2010 and 2014 Winter Olympics for France. He did not advance to the moguls final in either case, with best finish 23rd in 2014.

Benna's greatest achievement has been winning gold at the 2015 World Championships moguls event, with his previous best finish at the World Championships being 16th in 2007.

Benna made his World Cup debut in February 2005. As of January 2015, he has finished on the podium at World Cup events four times. His best finish is a silver in a dual moguls event at Meribel in 2011. His best World Cup moguls overall standing was 5th in 2009.

== World Cup podiums ==
Date	Location	Rank	Event
18 December 2008	Meribel	3rd place, bronze medalist(s)	Dual moguls
10 December 2011	Ruka	3rd place, bronze medalist(s)	Moguls
20 December 2011	Meribel	2nd place, silver medalist(s)	Dual moguls
13 December 2014	Ruka	3rd place, bronze medalist(s)	Dual Moguls
