= Lukáš Vaculík (skier) =

Czech freestyle skier

Personal information
- Born: 5 October 1986 (age 39) Vítkov, Czechoslovakia

Sport
- Sport: Freestyle skiing

Lukáš Vaculík (born 5 October 1986) is a Czech freestyle skier. He competed in the men's moguls event at the 2010 Winter Olympics.
