= Per Spett =

Swedish freestyle skier (born 1985)

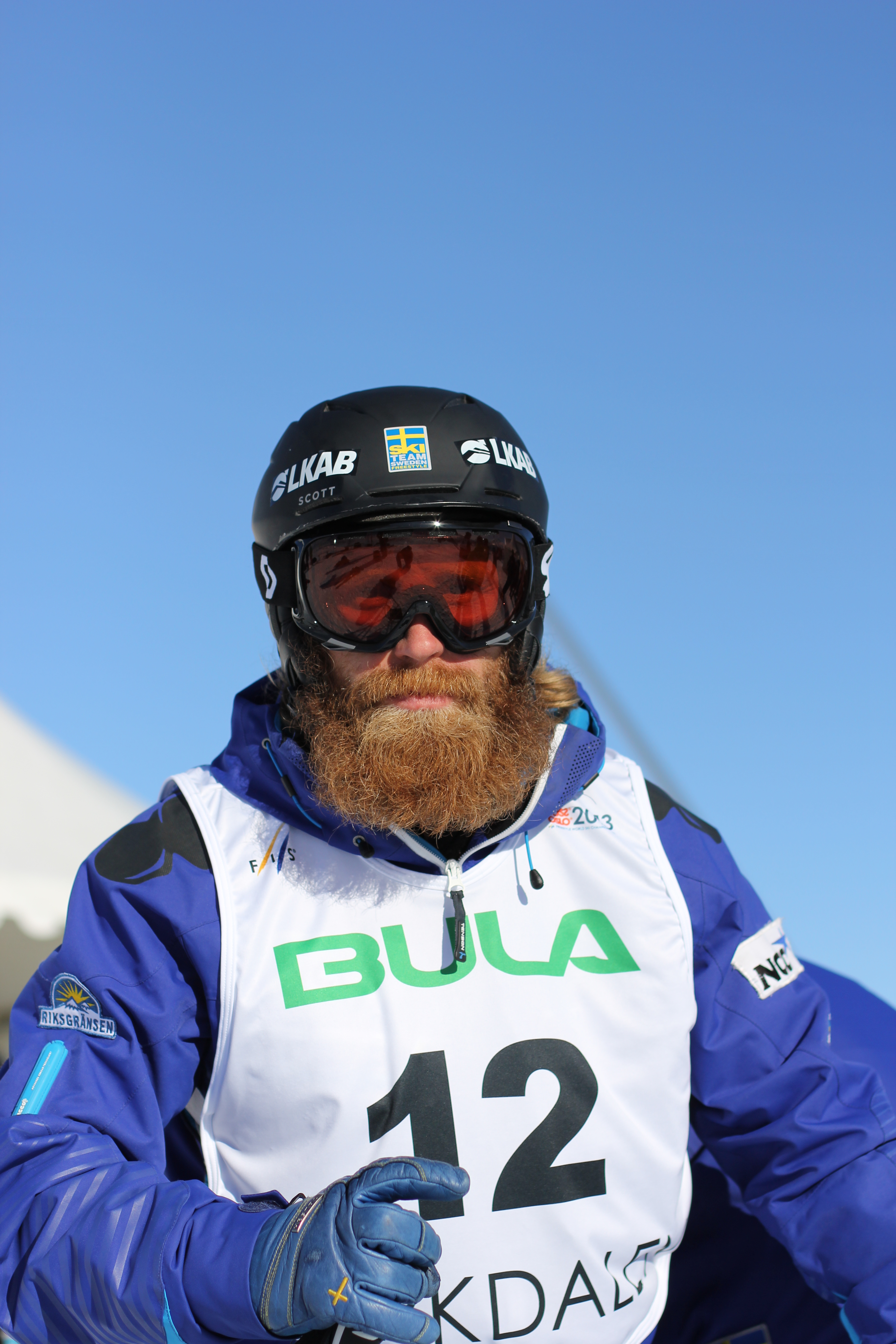
- Per Spett at the 2013 FIS World Championships in Voss.

Personal information
- Full name: Per Spett
- Born: August 24, 1985 (age 40) Jukkasjärvi, Sweden
- Height: 1.68 m (5 ft 6 in)
- Weight: 65 kg (143 lb)

Sport
- Country: Sweden
- Sport: Freestyle skiing
- Updated on March 2, 2013

Per Spett (born August 24, 1985 in Jukkasjärvi) is a Swedish freestyle skier, musician, specializing in moguls.

Spett competed at the 2006 and 2010 Winter Olympics for Sweden. Both times he did not advance to the moguls final, finishing 23rd in the preliminaries.

As of February 2013, his best showing at the World Championships is 8th, in 2009.

Spett made his World Cup debut in December 2003. As of February 2013, his best performance at a World Cup event is 5th, in a dual moguls event at Are in 2011/12. His best World Cup overall finish is 13th, in 2011/12.

When not skiing, Spett works in an iron ore mine in Kiruna.
