= Patrick Deneen (skier) =

American freestyle skier (born 1987)

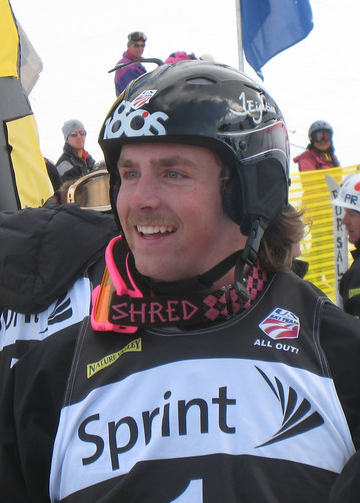

Personal information
- Born: December 25, 1987 (age 38) Redmond, Washington
- Height: 5 ft 7 in (170 cm)
- Website: PatrickDeneen.com

Sport
- Country: United States
- Sport: Moguls, Dual Moguls
Medal record
Men's freestyle skiing
Representing the United States
World Championships
Gold medal – first place	2009 Inawashiro	Moguls
Bronze medal – third place	2013 Voss	Moguls
Bronze medal – third place	2013 Voss	Dual moguls

Patrick Deneen (born December 25, 1987) is an American freestyle skier, specializing in moguls. Deneen was the gold medalist at the 2009 International Ski Federation (FIS) Freestyle World Ski Championships. In December 2009, Deneen won the US Olympic trials, held at Steamboat Springs, Colorado, securing a spot on the US Olympic Team for the 2010 Winter Olympics in Vancouver. In FIS World Cup events, he has reached the podium at 4 events in 25 starts, and was the 2008 Freestyle Rookie of the Year.

== Early life and career ==
A native of the Snoqualmie Pass area of Washington, Deneen was raised in Cle Elum where his family's ranch remains his home. His family's life revolved around the world of skiing; Deneen's father Pat was part owner and general manager of the Hyak ski area (now part of The Summit at Snoqualmie), where his mother Nancy managed sales. The local ski shop was owned and operated by Deneen's grandfather.

Surrounded by family and friends, Deneen took his first turns on skis at the age of 11 months, two months after he began walking. His father had brought him to a ski shop asking for the smallest skis they had, and had to stuff newspaper in the boots in order for them to fit. "The boot-fitter was just shaking his head," said Deneen's father. After his father found the flattest slope near the lodge, Deneen skied down toward his mother who was at the bottom, turning along the way as people called his name.

Deneen was homeschooled, allowing ample time for skiing pursuits, up to 190 days a year. He began competitive skiing at the age of 7 as an alpine skier, and was a top ranked junior in downhill before starting to freestyle. As a junior downhiller he was a member of the racing team at Silver Mountain, Idaho where he and his family spent winters. His competitive endeavors were not confined to the slopes however, he was also a youth champion in the equestrian sport reining.

At the age of 15, he gave up competitive horse riding to focus on skiing, and began the transition from alpine to freestyle; at one point he won a downhill race and a moguls contest during the same weekend. He developed quickly as a freestyle skier, and was named to the US Junior Ski Team by the age of 16. Deneen made his first FIS World Cup start in January 2005 at Lake Placid, New York; the following year, after returning from an injury, he was bronze medalist at the World Junior Championships at Krasnoye Ozero, Russia.

== Professional career ==
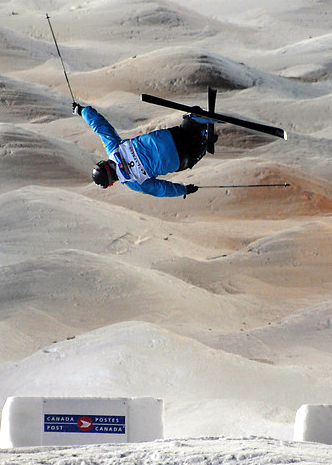
Deneen in action at 2009 Olympic test event at Cypress Mountain

Deneen had difficulties at the beginning of his professional career; after his World Cup debut, in which he finished 48th, he was forced off the international circuit for a year due to a knee injury. Deneen's bronze medal performance at the 2006 Junior Championships was his first major competition after returning from injury. He spent the following season on the North American Freestyle Circuit (NORAM). With a NORAM dual moguls championship in 2007, he regained his spot on the US Ski Team.

Returning to the FIS World Cup circuit in January 2008, Deneen reached the podium with two straight 3rd-place finishes at Lake Placid, New York. Over the rest of the 2008 season, he started 7 more World Cup events, with another 3rd-place finish at Valmalenco, Italy in March. Deneen's overall performance in 2008, his first full season on the tour, earned him the Rookie of the Year award which is voted on by the international coaches. During that season, Deneen became well known for his speed on the slope, prompting 1994 Olympic moguls champion Jean-Luc Brassard to nickname him "The Rocket".

Deneen's 2009 World Cup season was marked by inconsistent results, including 4 crashes; his finishes ranged from 3rd to 45th and 47th place within the span of one week in January. In February, he finished an American best 4th place at an Olympic test event at Cypress Mountain, the venue for freestyle skiing at the 2010 Winter Olympics. He competed in two other World Cup events in February, finishing 17th and 23rd, before heading to Inawashiro, Japan for the FIS Freestyle World Ski Championships.

During the World Championships, Deneen incorporated a new jump into his two clean runs—the Back X, performing a back flip while crossing skis. His final score of 23.41 beat the closest competitor by more than 1.5 points earning him the gold medal.

The first two events of the 2009–2010 season, Deneen was unable to finish in the top 20; he however rebounded once again at the US Olympic trials at Steamboat Springs, Colorado. On his final run, he landed a back layout and a twisting 720-degree spin, earning a score of 26.68 which bested the runner-up by fifty-seven hundredths of a point. His win at Steamboat secured a spot on the US Team for the 2010 Winter Olympics in Vancouver, British Columbia.

In his Olympic debut at the Vancouver Games, after qualifying in 10th place with a score of 23.97, Deneen crashed on his run in the finals. The run was not scored, and he officially finished tied for 19th place.

== See also ==
- Freestyle skiing at the 2010 Winter Olympics – Men's moguls
