= Alexandr Smyshlyaev =

Russian freestyle skier

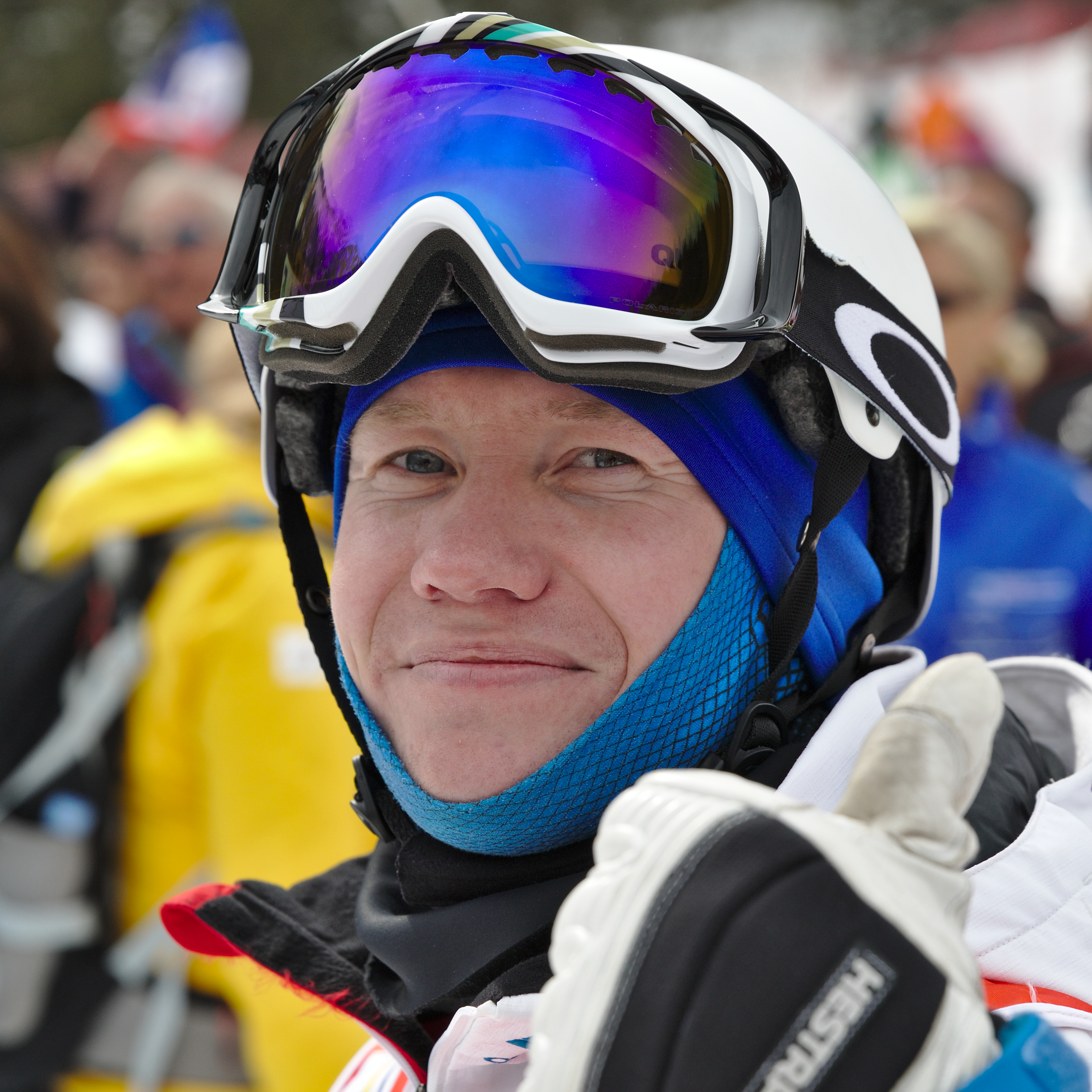
- Smyshlyaev in 2015

Personal information
- Full name: Alexandr Aleksandrovich Smyshlyaev
- Nationality: Russia
- Born: 16 March 1987 (age 39) Lysva, Perm Krai, RSFSR, USSR (now Russia)

Sport
- Sport: Skiing
Medal record
Men's freestyle skiing
Representing Russia
Olympic Games
Bronze medal – third place	2014 Sochi	Moguls
World Championships
Bronze medal – third place	2015 Kreischberg	Moguls

Alexandr Aleksandrovich Smyshlyaev (Russian: Александр Александрович Смышляев, born 16 March 1987) is a Russian freestyle skier who specializes in the moguls discipline.

== Career ==
Smyshlyaev competed at the 2006, 2010, 2014, and 2018 Winter Olympics. At the 2014 Olympics in Sochi, he won a bronze medal in the men's moguls event.

At the 2015 Freestyle World Ski Championships in Kreischberg, he won a bronze medal in the men's moguls event.
