= Marc-Antoine Gagnon =

Canadian freestyle skier

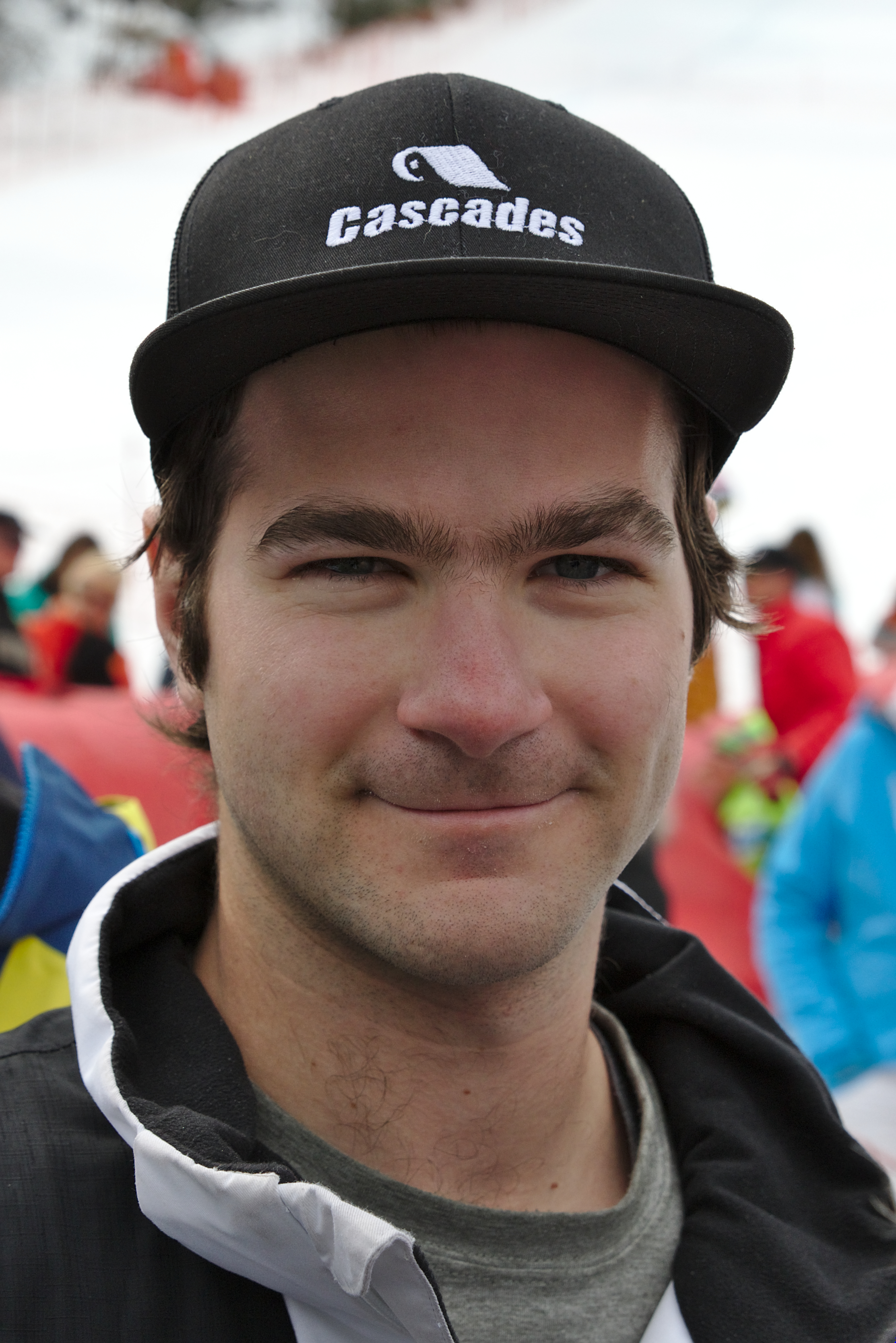

Personal information
- Nickname: KG
- Born: March 6, 1991 (age 35) Montreal, Quebec, Canada
- Home town: Terrebonne, Quebec
- Height: 5 ft 9 in (1.75 m)
- Weight: 170 lb (77 kg; 12 st)

Sport
- Country: Canada
Medal record
Men'sFreestyle skiing
Representing Canada
World Championships
Bronze medal – third place	2015 Kreischberg	Dual moguls

Marc-Antoine Gagnon (born March 6, 1991) is a Canadian freestyle skier. Gagnon represented Canada at the 2014 Winter Olympics in the moguls event. He placed fourth, narrowly losing to Russia's Alexandr Smyshlyaev for the bronze medal. Gagnon won a bronze as part of a Canadian podium sweep in the dual moguls event at the 2015 World Championships.
