= Mogul skiing =

Discipline of freestyle skiing

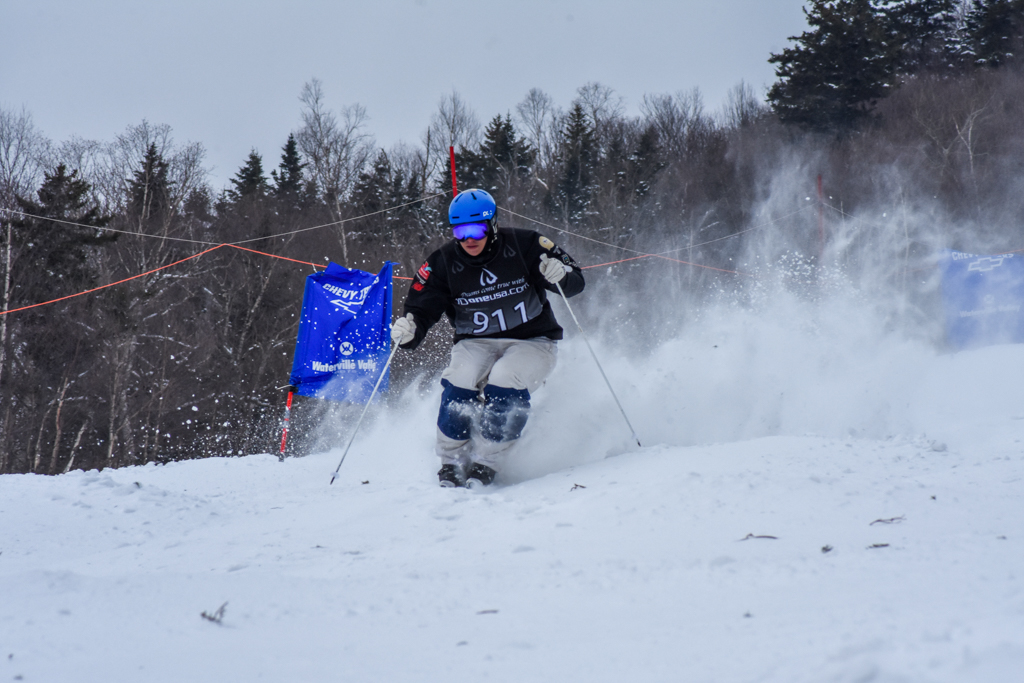
- An athlete mogul skiing at Waterville Valley Resort
- Highest governing body: International Ski and Snowboard Federation

Characteristics
- Type: Freestyle skiing

Presence
- Country or region: Worldwide
- Olympic: 1988 as demonstration event; Medal event since 1992

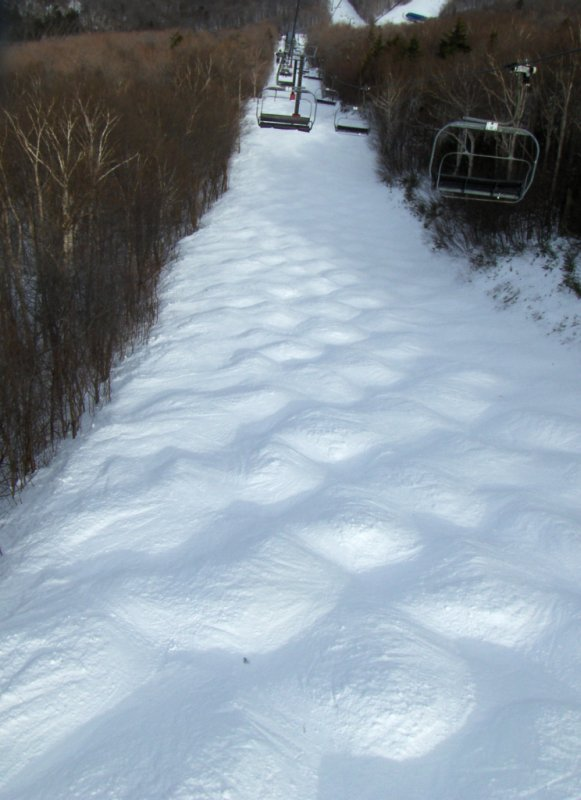
Moguls at Sugarbush, Vermont

Mogul skiing, commonly shortened to moguls, is a freestyle skiing competition consisting of one timed run of free skiing on a steep, bumpy course, stressing technical turns, aerial maneuvers and speed. Internationally, the sport is contested at the FIS Freestyle World Ski Championships, and at the Winter Olympic Games.

Moguls are a series of bumps on a piste formed when skiers push snow into mounds as they do sharp turns. This tends to happen naturally as skiers use the slope but they can also be constructed artificially. Once formed, a naturally occurring mogul tends to grow as skiers follow similar paths around it, further deepening the surrounding grooves known as troughs. Since skiing tends to be a series of linked turns, moguls form together to create a bump field.

The term mogul is from the Bavarian/Austrian German word Mugel, meaning 'mound, hillock'.

== Competition ==
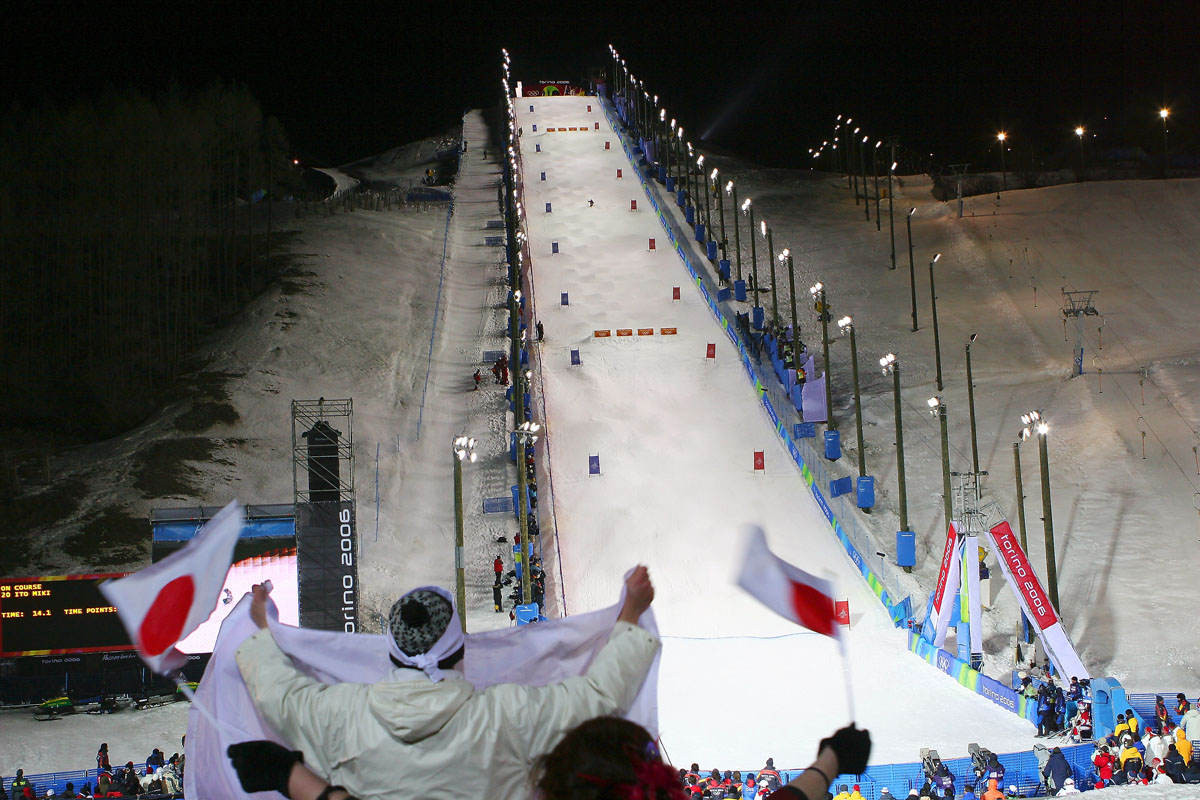
Slope for mogul skiing at the 2006 Winter Olympics

The first competition involving mogul skiing occurred in 1971. The International Ski and Snowboard Federation (FIS) created the Freestyle World Cup Circuit in 1980. The first World Championships were held in 1986, and are currently held in odd-numbered years. It was a demonstration sport in freestyle skiing at the 1988 Winter Olympics in Calgary. It has been a medal event in the Winter Olympics since 1992.

Mogul courses are between 200 and 270 metres with an average slope grade of 26 degrees. The moguls themselves are set approximately 3.5 metres apart. The course includes two small jumps which are used as a take-off for aerial maneuvers. Athletes can perform upright or inverted tricks off these jumps in the course of a competition run. Dual Mogul competition consists of elimination rounds where pairs of competitors compete against each other. Each loser is eliminated and each winner advances to the next round until a final result is achieved.

=== Scoring ===
- Turns count for 60% of the score. This is a technical evaluation by judges, including the rhythmic changes in the direction of travel to either side of the fall line (the shortest line from start to finish), using an aggressive, controlled technique. The skier should employ carve turns, and should not skid or plow. The head should remain still, facing downhill. The chest should also stay straight and natural. Hands stay in front of the body in a natural position. Pole plants should be light and well-timed.
- Air (jumps) counts for 20% of the score. Air is scored in two parts: form and difficulty. Jumps include flips, loops, rotations (helicopters/360, 720), and upright jumps such as a spread eagle.
- Speed counts for 20% of the score. Competitors receive a full score for speed at 10.3 m/s for women and 11.8 m/s for men.

== See also ==
- List of Olympic medalists in freestyle skiing
- Alpine skiing
