= FIS Freestyle Junior World Ski Championships =

Youth freestyle skiing competition

FIS Freestyle Junior World Ski Championships are the Junior World Championships in freestyle skiing organized by the International Ski Federation (FIS). With the exception of Ski Cross, participation in Junior World Ski Championships is limited to competitors whose age is between fourteen and nineteen in the calendar year of the Championship. Ski Cross is limited to competitors between the ages of sixteen and twenty.

== Hosts ==
Year	Location	Country	Disciplines
FIS Freestyle Junior World Ski Championships
2003	Marble Mountain	Canada	2xHP, 2xMO, 2xAE, 2xDM
2006	Krasnoe Ozero	Russia	MO, DM, AE, SX
2007	Airolo	Switzerland	MO, DM, AE, SX, HP
2010	Otago	New Zealand	SX, HP, SS
2011	Jyväskylä	Finland	4xMO, DM
2012	Chiesa in Valmalenco	Italy	MO, DM, AE, SX, HP, SS
2013	Chiesa in Valmalenco	Italy	MO, DM, AE, SX, HP, SS
2014	Chiesa in Valmalenco	Italy	MO, DM, AE, SX, HP, SS
2015	Chiesa in Valmalenco	Italy	MO, DM, AE, SX, HP, SS
2016	Minsk	Belarus	AE
2016	Val Thorens	France	4xSX
2016	Åre	Sweden	MO, DM
2017	Crans Montana	Switzerland	HP
2017	Chiesa in Valmalenco	Italy	MO, DM, AE, SX, SS
2018	Minsk	Belarus	AE
2018	Duved	Sweden	MO, DM
2018	Cardrona	New Zealand	4xSX, 4xHP, 4xSS, 4xBA
FIS Freestyle Ski and Snowboarding Junior World Championships
2019	Leysin	Switzerland	HP
2019	Reiteralm	Austria	SX
2019	Chiesa in Valmalenco	Italy	MO, DM, AE
2019	Kläppen	Sweden	4xSS, 4xBA
2020	St. Lary	France	cancelled due to the COVID-19 pandemic
2020	Chiesa in Valmalenco	Italy	cancelled due to the COVID-19 pandemic
2021	Krasnoyarsk	Russia	MO, DM, AE, SX, 4xHP, 4xSS, 2xBA, SXT, AET
2022	Leysin	Switzerland	4xHP, 4xSS, 4xBA
2022	Chiesa in Valmalenco	Italy	2xMO, 2xDM, 2xAE, AET, DMT
2022	Veysonnaz	Switzerland	4xSX
2023	Airolo	Switzerland	2xMO, 2xDM, DMT
2023	Obertauern	Austria	2xAE, AET
2023	Passo San Pellegrino	Italy	2xSX, SXT
2023	Cardrona	New Zealand	2xSS, 2xBA
2024	Livigno/Mottolino	Italy	2xSS, 2xBA
2024	Chiesa in Valmalenco	Italy	2xAE, AET, 2xMO, 2xDM, DMT
2024	Idre Fjäll	Sweden	2xSX, SXT
2025	Almaty	Kazakhstan	2xAE, 2xMO, 2xDM, DMT, AET
2025	Isola 2000	France	2xSX, SXT
2026	Calgary	Canada	2xSS, 2xBA, 2xHP, 2xRE
2026	Airolo	Switzerland	2xMO, 2xAE, AET, DMT, 2xDM
2026	St. Moritz	Switzerland	2xSX, SXT

== Men's events ==
=== Aerials ===
Year	Location	Gold	Silver	Bronze
2003	Marble Mountain	Dzianis Osipau (BLR)	Sun Peng (CHN)	Tsimafei Slivets (BLR)
2006	Krasnoe Ozero	Maxim Gustik (BLR)	Oleksandr Abramenko (UKR)	Anton Sannikov (RUS)
2007	Airolo	Maxim Gustik (BLR)	Dylan Ferguson (USA)	Wu Chao (CHN)
2012	Chiesa in Valmalenco	Zhining Zhang (CHN)	Jonathon Lillis (USA)	Wang Xindi (CHN)
2013	Chiesa in Valmalenco	Stanislav Nikitin (RUS)	Vasily Polenov (RUS)	Dmitry Glushakov (BLR)
2014	Chiesa in Valmalenco	Maxim Burov (RUS)	Wang Shuang (CHN)	Vasily Polenov (RUS)
2015	Chiesa in Valmalenco	Harrison Smith (USA)	Maxim Burov (RUS)	Lloyd Wallace (GBR)
2016	Minsk	Maxim Burov (RUS)	Dzmitry Mazurkevich (BLR)	Noé Roth (SUI)
2017	Chiesa in Valmalenco	Dzmitry Mazurkevich (BLR)	Pavel Dzik (BLR)	Sun Jiaxu (CHN)
2018	Minsk	Noé Roth (SUI)	Dzmitry Mazurkevich (BLR)	Sun Jiaxu (CHN)
2019	Chiesa in Valmalenco	Viachaslau Tsimertsau (BLR)	Ihar Drabiankou (BLR)	Boyan Li (CHN)
2021	Krasnoyarsk	Artem Potapov (RUS)	Makar Mitrafanau (BLR)	Andrei Kuzmin (BLR)
2022	Chiesa in Valmalenco	Victor Primeau (CAN)	Quinn Dehlinger (USA)	Émile Nadeau (CAN)
2023	Obertauern	Wang Guochen (CHN)	Volodymyr Kushnir (UKR)	Connor Curran (USA)
2024	Chiesa in Valmalenco	Alexandre Duchaine (CAN)	Miha Fontaine (CAN)	Connor Curran (USA)
2025	Almaty	Dinmukhammed Raimkulov (KAZ)	Yang Yuheng (CHN)	Yang Zhicheng (CHN)
2026	Airolo	Assylkhan Assan (KAZ)	Dinmukhammed Raimkulov (KAZ)	Uladzislau Vazniuk (AIN)

=== Moguls ===
Year	Location	Gold	Silver	Bronze
2003	Marble Mountain	Nobuyuki Nishi (JPN)	Tim Preston (USA)	Antoine Perrin (FRA)
2006	Krasnoe Ozero	Andrey Volkov (RUS)	Anthony Benna (FRA)	Jay Bowman-Kirigin (USA)
2007	Airolo	Bryon Wilson (USA)	Jay Bowman-Kirigin (USA)	Joseph Discoe (USA)
2011	Jyväskylä	Ville Miettunen (FIN)	Benjamin Cavet (GBR)	Olli Penttala (FIN)
2012	Chiesa in Valmalenco	Bradley Wilson (USA)	Ludvig Fjällström (SWE)	Choi Jae-woo (KOR)
2013	Chiesa in Valmalenco	Ludvig Fjällström (SWE)	Jussi Penttala (FIN)	Pirmin Kaufmann (GER)
2014	Chiesa in Valmalenco	Thomas Rowley (USA)	Benjamin Cavet (FRA)	Egor Anufriev (RUS)
2015	Chiesa in Valmalenco	Aleksey Pavlenko (RUS)	Egor Anufriev (RUS)	Andrey Makhnev (RUS)
2016	Åre	Hunter Bailey (USA)	Walter Wallberg (SWE)	Joel Hedrick (USA)
2017	Chiesa in Valmalenco	Jack Kariotis (USA)	Thomas Gerken Schofield (GBR)	Loke Nilsson (SWE)
2018	Duved	Loke Nilsson (SWE)	Albin Holmgren (SWE)	Thibaud Mouille (FRA)
2019	Chiesa in Valmalenco	Nikita Novitskii (RUS)	Masahiro Kimoto (JPN)	Akseli Ahvenainen (FIN)
2021	Krasnoyarsk	Nikita Andreev (RUS)	Akseli Ahvenainen (FIN)	Artem Shuldyakov (RUS)
2022	Chiesa in Valmalenco	Cole McDonald (USA)	Enea Buzzi (SUI)	Filip Gravenfors (SWE)
2023	Chiesa in Valmalenco	Filip Gravenfors (SWE)	Jung Dae-yoon (KOR)	Asher Michel (USA)
2024	Chiesa in Valmalenco	Mateo Jeannesson (GBR)	Jung Dae-yoon (KOR)	Asher Michel (USA)
2025	Almaty	Osuke Nakahara (JPN)	Léo Crozet (FRA)	Lee Yoon-seung (KOR)
2026	Airolo	Elis Moberg (SWE)	Porter Huff (USA)	Camden Lewis (USA)

=== Dual moguls ===
Year	Location	Gold	Silver	Bronze
2003	Marble Mountain	Tom Mazur (CAN)	Takumi Ootani (JPN)	Ruslan Sharifullin (RUS)
2006	Krasnoe Ozero	Andrey Volkov (RUS)	Jay Bowman-Kirigin (USA)	Patrick Deneen (USA)
2007	Airolo	Dmitriy Reiherd (KAZ)	Jimmy Discoe (USA)	Jay Bowman-Kirigin (USA)
2011	Jyväskylä	Bryan Zemba (USA)	Jussi Penttala (FIN)	Jens Laurite (SWE)
2012	Chiesa in Valmalenco	Rikuya Tanaka (JPN)	Fredrik Saterberg (SWE)	Aleksey Pavlenko (RUS)
2013	Chiesa in Valmalenco	Thomas Rowley (USA)	Ludvig Fjällström (SWE)	Pavel Kolmakov (KAZ)
2014	Chiesa in Valmalenco	Benjamin Cavet (FRA)	Thomas Rowley (USA)	Marco Tadé (SUI)
2015	Chiesa in Valmalenco	Aleksey Pavlenko (RUS)	Egor Anufriev (RUS)	Casey Andringa (USA)
2016	Åre	Laurent Dumais (CAN)	Emerson Smith (USA)	Pavel Kolmakov (KAZ)
2017	Chiesa in Valmalenco	Riku Voutilainen (FIN)	Thomas Gerken Schofield (GBR)	Jack Kariotis (USA)
2018	Duved	Walter Wallberg (SWE)	Nicolas Degaches (FRA)	Takashi Koyama (JPN)
2019	Chiesa in Valmalenco	Elliot Vaillancourt (CAN)	Masahiro Kimoto (JPN)	Alex Lewis (USA)
2021	Krasnoyarsk	Shima Kawaoka (JPN)	Artem Shuldyakov (RUS)	Vyacheslav Novikov (RUS)
2022	Chiesa in Valmalenco	Nick Page (USA)	Emil Holmgren (SWE)	Filip Gravenfors (SWE)
2023	Chiesa in Valmalenco	Filip Gravenfors (SWE)	Emil Holmgren (SWE)	Mateo Jeannesson (GBR)
2024	Chiesa in Valmalenco	Ikkei Fujimura (JPN)	Jung Dae-yoon (KOR)	Mateo Jeannesson (GBR)
2025	Almaty	Matyáš Kroupa (CZE)	Léo Crozet (FRA)	Noé Lameille (FRA)
2026	Airolo	Noel Gravenfors (SWE)	Jack Egan (USA)	Matyas Kroupa (CZE)

=== Ski cross ===
Year	Location	Gold	Silver	Bronze
2006	Krasnoe Ozero	Andi Schauer (GER)	Anders Rekdal (NOR)	Petr Takac (CZE)
2007	Airolo	Renato Trummer (SUI)	Gregor Vinzens (SUI)	Armin Niederer (SUI)
2010	Otago	Didrik Bastian Juell (NOR)	Morten Ring Christensen (NOR)	Georgy Kornlov (RUS)
2012	Chiesa in Valmalenco	John Eklund (SWE)	Terence Tchiknavorian (FRA)	Roman Ilin (RUS)
2013	Chiesa in Valmalenco	Francesco Mauriello (ITA)	Terence Tchiknavorian (FRA)	Marzellus Renn (GER)
2014	Chiesa in Valmalenco	Magnus Bjoernnes (NOR)	John Eklund (SWE)	Valentin Egger (GER)
2015	Chiesa in Valmalenco	Tyler Wallasch (USA)	Tim Hronek (GER)	Artem Kostenko (RUS)
2016	Val Thorens	Sandro Siebenhofer (AUT)	David Mobärg (SWE)	Kristofor Mahler (CAN)
2017	Chiesa in Valmalenco	Florian Wilmsmann (GER)	Zach Belczyk (CAN)	Erik Mobärg (SWE)
2018	Cardrona	Oliver Davies (GBR)	Sandro Siebenhofer (AUT)	Maxim Vikhrov (RUS)
2019	Reiteralm	David Mobärg (SWE)	Gavin Rowell (CAN)	Douglas Crawford (AUS)
2021	Krasnoyarsk	Oliver Vierthaler (AUT)	Simone Deromedis (ITA)	Vladimir Shmyrov (RUS)
2022	Veysonnaz	Lucas Richard (SUI)	Sebastian Veit (GER)	Fredrik Nilsson (SWE)
2023	San Pellegrino Pass	Fredrik Nilsson (SWE)	Christoph Danksagmüller (AUT)	Robin Tissieres (SUI)
2024	Idre Fjäll	Kaleb Barnum (CAN)	Nicholas Katrusiak (CAN)	Till Hugenroth (GER)
2025	Isola 2000	Sebastian Engelbrekts (SWE)	Nico Offenwanger (GER)	Sebastian Machl (GER)
2026	St. Moritz	Sebastian Machl (GER)	Edgar Baillet (FRA)	Niklas Hoeller (GER)

=== Halfpipe ===
Year	Location	Gold	Silver	Bronze
2003	Marble Mountain	Aurélien Fornier (FRA)	Davey Bowe (AUS)	Mickael Moh (FRA)
2007	Airolo	Kevin Rolland (FRA)	Antti-Jus Kemppainen (FIN)	Kalle Leinonen (FIN)
2010	Otago	Noah Bowman (CAN)	Walter Wood (USA)	Kristopher Atkinson (CAN)
2012	Chiesa in Valmalenco	Cancelled		
2013	Chiesa in Valmalenco	Gurimu Narita (JPN)	Broby Leeds (USA)	Frederick Iliano (SUI)
2014	Chiesa in Valmalenco	Beau-James Wells (NZL)	Joel Gisler (SUI)	Kalle Hilden (FIN)
2015	Chiesa in Valmalenco	Beau-James Wells (NZL)	Jake Mageau (USA)	Birk Irving (USA)
2017	Crans Montana	Rafael Kreienbühl (SUI)	Samson Schuiling (USA)	Robin Briguet (SUI)
2018	Cardrona	Nico Porteous (NZL)	Dylan Ladd (USA)	Birk Ruud (NOR)
2019	Leysin	Connor Ladd (USA)	Hunter Carey (USA)	Aaron Durlester (USA)
2021	Krasnoyarsk	Henry Sildaru (EST)	Lee Seung-hun (KOR)	Fedor Muralev (RUS)
2022	Leysin	Gustav Legnavsky (NZL)	Matthew Labaugh (USA)	Ben Fethke (USA)
2023	Cardrona	Cancelled		
2024–2025	Not contested			
2026	Calgary	Alexander Swedenborg (USA)	Mack Winterberger (USA)	Cooper Breen (NZL)

=== Slopestyle ===
Year	Location	Gold	Silver	Bronze
2010	Otago	Bobby Brown (USA)	Gus Kenworthy (USA)	Jonas Hunziker (SUI)
2012	Chiesa in Valmalenco	Kai Mahler (SUI)	Oistein Braaten (NOR)	Jonas Hunziker (SUI)
2013	Chiesa in Valmalenco	Felix Stridsberg-Usterud (NOR)	Brent Whipple (USA)	Luca Tribondeau (AUT)
2014	Chiesa in Valmalenco	Joona Kangas (FIN)	Till Matti (SUI)	Robert Andre Ruud (NOR)
2015	Chiesa in Valmalenco	Luca Schuler (SUI)	Beau-James Wells (NZL)	Birk Ruud (NOR)
2017	Chiesa in Valmalenco	Taisei Yamamoto (JPN)	Oliwer Magnusson (SWE)	Ryan Stevenson (USA)
2018	Cardrona	Oliwer Magnusson (SWE)	Sebastian Schjerve (NOR)	Kim Gubser (SUI)
2019	Kläppen	Édouard Therriault (CAN)	Kiernan Fagan (USA)	Ulrik Samnøy (NOR)
2021	Krasnoyarsk	Matěj Švancer (CZE)	Daniel Bacher (AUT)	Henry Sildaru (EST)
2022	Leysin	Troy Podmilsak (USA)	Matthew Labaugh (USA)	Axel Burmansson (SWE)
2023	Cardrona	Charlie Beatty (CAN)	Fadri Rhyner (SUI)	Leo Landroe (NOR)
2024	Livigno/Mottolino	Frank Wahlström (NOR)	Henry Townshend (USA)	Henry Sildaru (EST)
2025	Not contested			
2026	Calgary	Jonas Larsen (NOR)	Lucas Ball (NZL)	Kalle Palkinen (FIN)

=== Big air ===
Year	Location	Gold	Silver	Bronze
2018	Cardrona	Mac Forehand (USA)	Ryan Stevenson (USA)	Thibault Magnin (ESP)
2019	Kläppen	Ulrik Samnøy (NOR)	Kiernan Fagan (USA)	Deven Fagan (USA)
2021	Krasnoyarsk	Matěj Švancer (CZE)	Daniel Bacher (AUT)	Miro Tabanelli (ITA)
2022	Leysin	Troy Podmilsak (USA)	Luca Harrington (NZL)	Leo Landroe (NOR)
2023	Cardrona	Leo Landroe (NOR)	Matthew Lepine (CAN)	Fadri Rhyner (SUI)
2024	Livigno/Mottolino	Qualifying heats and final cancelled due to adverse weather		
2025	Not contested			
2026	Calgary	Frank Wahlstroem (NOR)	Lucas Ball (NZL)	Jude Oliver (CAN)

=== Rail event ===
Year	Location	Gold	Silver	Bronze
2026	Calgary	Melvin Seliberg (SWE)	Axel A Indrevik (NOR)	Leon Vist Benjaminsen (NOR)

== Women's events ==
=== Aerials ===
Year	Location	Gold	Silver	Bronze
2003	Marble Mountain	Anna Zukal (RUS)	Dai Shuangfei (CHN)	Anna Belikh (RUS)
2006	Krasnoe Ozero	Nadiya Didenko (UKR)	Nadja Leuenberger (SUI)	Olga Polyuk (UKR)
2007	Airolo	Xu Mengtao (CHN)	Yang Yu (CHN)	Olga Polyuk (UKR)
2012	Chiesa in Valmalenco	Quan Huilin (CHN)	Hanna Huskova (BLR)	Kiley McKinnon (USA)
2013	Chiesa in Valmalenco	Quan Huilin (CHN)	Anastasiya Novosad (UKR)	Aleksandra Orlova (RUS)
2014	Chiesa in Valmalenco	Catrine Lavallée (CAN)	Aleksandra Orlova (RUS)	Liubov Nikitina (RUS)
2015	Chiesa in Valmalenco	Aliaksandra Ramanouskaya (BLR)	Zhanbota Aldabergenova (KAZ)	Elle Gaudette (USA)
2016	Minsk	Aliaksandra Ramanouskaya (BLR)	Aleksandra Orlova (RUS)	Liubov Nikitina (RUS)
2017	Chiesa in Valmalenco	Liubov Nikitina (RUS)	Winter Vinecki (USA)	Qi Shao (CHN)
2018	Minsk	Liubov Nikitina (RUS)	Qi Shao (CHN)	Carol Bouvard (SUI)
2019	Chiesa in Valmalenco	Sniazhana Drabiankova (BLR)	Jia Liya (CHN)	Yana Yarmashevich (BLR)
2021	Krasnoyarsk	Anastasiia Prytkova (RUS)	Alexandra Bär (SUI)	Ursina Platz (SUI)
2022	Chiesa in Valmalenco	Flavie Aumond (CAN)	Kaila Kuhn (USA)	Alexandra Bär (SUI)
2023	Obertauern	Chen Meiting (CHN)	Liu Xuanchi (CHN)	Amelia Glogowski (USA)
2024	Chiesa in Valmalenco	Shen Jinyi (CHN)	Yang Xinyi (CHN)	Anhelina Brykina (UKR)
2025	Almaty	Shen Haohao (CHN)	Wang Qixian (CHN)	Wang Xue (CHN)
2026	Airolo	Liubou Pilipenka (AIN)	Alexandra Montminy (CAN)	Diana Yablonska (UKR)

=== Moguls ===
Year	Location	Gold	Silver	Bronze
2003	Marble Mountain	Hannah Kearney (USA)	Jessica Davis (USA)	Lauren Crawford (USA)
2006	Krasnoe Ozero	Ekaterina Stolyarova (RUS)	Elena Muratova (RUS)	Caterian Mader (USA)
2007	Airolo	Ekaterina Stolyarova (RUS)	Kayla Snyderman (USA)	Chloé Dufour-Lapointe (CAN)
2011	Jyväskylä	Yuliya Galysheva (KAZ)	Marika Pertachiya (RUS)	Tereza Vaculíková (CZE)
2012	Chiesa in Valmalenco	Yuliya Galysheva (KAZ)	Anna Park (USA)	Marika Pertakhiya (RUS)
2013	Chiesa in Valmalenco	Keaton McCargo (USA)	Leonie Gerken Schofield (GBR)	Kaitlyn Harrell (USA)
2014	Chiesa in Valmalenco	Keaton McCargo (USA)	Morgan Schild (USA)	Perrine Laffont (FRA)
2015	Chiesa in Valmalenco	Perrine Laffont (FRA)	Avital Shimko (USA)	Jaelin Kauf (USA)
2016	Åre	Perrine Laffont (FRA)	Tess Johnson (USA)	Léa Bouard (FRA)
2017	Chiesa in Valmalenco	Trudy Mickel (USA)	Anastasia Smirnova (RUS)	Olivia Giaccio (USA)
2018	Duved	Kisara Sumiyoshi (JPN)	Hinako Tomitaka (JPN)	Viktoriia Lazarenko (RUS)
2019	Chiesa in Valmalenco	Sabrina Cass (USA)	Hinako Tomitaka (JPN)	Viktoriia Lazarenko (RUS)
2021	Krasnoyarsk	Anri Kawamura (JPN)	Viktoriia Lazarenko (RUS)	Anastasiia Smirnova (RUS)
2022	Chiesa in Valmalenco	Elizabeth Lemley (USA)	Anastassiya Gorodko (KAZ)	Alli Macuga (USA)
2023	Chiesa in Valmalenco	Shiori Asano (JPN)	Marin Ito (JPN)	Ashley Koehler (CAN)
2024	Chiesa in Valmalenco	Anastassiya Gorodko (KAZ)	Marin Ito (JPN)	Yuma Taguchi (JPN)
2025	Almaty	Yuma Taguchi (JPN)	Anastassiya Gorodko (KAZ)	Kurea Mise (JPN)
2026	Airolo	Nova Nilsson (SWE)	Abby Mclarnon (USA)	Mio Tani (JPN)

=== Dual moguls ===
Year	Location	Gold	Silver	Bronze
2003	Marble Mountain	Hannah Kearney (USA)	Jessica Davis (USA)	Nadezhda Vaganova (RUS)
2006	Krasnoe Ozero	Alizee Boulangeat (FRA)	Deborah Scanzio (ITA)	Elena Muratova (RUS)
2007	Airolo	Chloé Dufour-Lapointe (CAN)	Ekaterina Stolyarova (RUS)	Yuliya Rodionova (KAZ)
2011	Jyväskylä	Marika Pertakhiya (RUS)	Emilie Klingen Amundsen (NOR)	Isabella Cedercreutz (FIN)
2012	Chiesa in Valmalenco	Ali Kariotis (USA)	Marika Pertakhiya (RUS)	Yuliya Galysheva (KAZ)
2013	Chiesa in Valmalenco	Keaton McCargo (USA)	Kaitlyn Harrell (USA)	Perrine Laffont (FRA)
2014	Chiesa in Valmalenco	Ali Kariotis (USA)	Morgan Schild (USA)	Keaton McCargo (USA)
2015	Chiesa in Valmalenco	Perrine Laffont (FRA)	Anastasiya Safiulina (RUS)	Léa Bouard (FRA)
2016	Åre	Hinako Tomitaka (JPN)	Léa Bouard (FRA)	Berkley Brown (CAN)
2017	Chiesa in Valmalenco	Olivia Giaccio (USA)	Nora Lodoen (NOR)	Anastasia Smirnova (RUS)
2018	Duved	Viktoriia Lazarenko (RUS)	Maïa Schwinghammer (CAN)	Anastasia Kulikova (RUS)
2019	Chiesa in Valmalenco	Anastasia Smirnova (RUS)	Hinako Tomitaka (JPN)	Kisara Sumiyoshi (JPN)
2021	Krasnoyarsk	Viktoriia Lazarenko (RUS)	Haruka Nakao (JPN)	Anastasia Smirnova (RUS)
2022	Chiesa in Valmalenco	Anastassiya Gorodko (KAZ)	Elizabeth Lemley (CAN)	Alli Macuga (USA)
2023	Chiesa in Valmalenco	Alli Macuga (USA)	Skylar Slettene (USA)	Kylie Kariotis (USA)
2024	Chiesa in Valmalenco	Kylie Kariotis (USA)	Anastassiya Gorodko (KAZ)	Yuma Taguchi (JPN)
2025	Almaty	Anastassiya Gorodko (KAZ)	Reese Chapdelaine (USA)	Abby McLarnon (USA)
2026	Airolo	Flavie Lamontagne (CAN)	Olivia Hedberg (SWE)	Victoria Johnson (USA)

=== Ski cross ===
Year	Location	Gold	Silver	Bronze
2006	Krasnoe Ozero	Julia Manhard (GER)	Meryl Boulangeat (FRA)	Alizee Boulangeat (FRA)
2007	Airolo	Alizee Boulangeat (FRA)	Clara Marsan (FRA)	Flurina Marugg (SUI)
2010	Otago	Fanny Smith (SUI)	Katrin Ofner (AUT)	Yulia Livinskaya (RUS)
2012	Chiesa in Valmalenco	Julia Eichinger (GER)	Jorinde Müller (SUI)	Emilie Benz (SUI)
2013	Chiesa in Valmalenco	Marielle Thompson (CAN)	Ekaterina Maltseva (RUS)	Ekaterina Starichenko (RUS)
2014	Chiesa in Valmalenco	Jorinde Müller (SUI)	Sandra Näslund (SWE)	Margarethe Aschauer (GER)
2015	Chiesa in Valmalenco	India Sherret (CAN)	Daniela Maier (GER)	Alexandra Edebo (SWE)
2016	Val Thorens	Sandra Näslund (SWE)	Victoria Zavadovskaya (RUS)	Laury Marullaz (FRA)
2017	Chiesa in Valmalenco	Sandra Näslund (SWE)	Lisa Andersson (SWE)	Alexa Velcic (CAN)
2018	Cardrona	Mikayla Martin (CAN)	Mazie Hayden (USA)	Elliane Hall (GBR)
2019	Reiteralm	Zoe Chore (CAN)	Talina Gantenbein (SUI)	Celia Funkler (GER)
2021	Krasnoyarsk	Darya Melchakova (RUS)	Diana Cholenská (CZE)	Polina Ryabova (RUS)
2022	Veysonnaz	Sonja Gigler (AUT)	Linnea Mobaerg (SWE)	Christina Födermayr (AUT)
2023	San Pellegrino Pass	Emeline Bennett (CAN)	Veronika Redder (GER)	Margaux Dumont (SUI)
2024	Idre Fjäll	Emeline Bennett (CAN)	Veronika Redder (GER)	Uma Kruse Een (SWE)
2025	Isola 2000	Veronika Redder (GER)	Leonie Bachl-Staudinger (GER)	Morgan Shute (USA)
2026	St. Moritz	Chiara Von Moos (SUI)	Valentine Lagger (SUI)	Roxy Coatesworth (CAN)

=== Halfpipe ===
Year	Location	Gold	Silver	Bronze
2003	Marble Mountain	Jennifer Hudak (USA)	Davina Williams (AUS)	Kendra Perry (CAN)
2007	Airolo	Kim Sharp (USA)	Sophia Schwartz (USA)	Anaïs Caradeux (FRA)
2010	Otago	Brita Sigourney (USA)	Hannah Haupt (USA)	Devin Logan (USA)
2012	Chiesa in Valmalenco	Cancelled		
2013	Chiesa in Valmalenco	Nina Ragettli (SUI)	Zyre Austin (USA)	Rowan Cheshire (GBR)
2014	Chiesa in Valmalenco	Sabrina Cakmakli (GER)	Elizaveta Chesnokova (RUS)	Jeanee Crane-Mauzy (USA)
2015	Chiesa in Valmalenco	Molly Summerhayes (GBR)	Valeriya Demidova (RUS)	Anna Gorham (USA)
2017	Crans Montana	Kelly Sildaru (EST)	Svea Irving (USA)	Valeriya Demidova (RUS)
2018	Cardrona	Kelly Sildaru (EST)	Valeriya Demidova (RUS)	Kexin Zhang (CHN)
2019	Leysin	Constance Brogden (GBR)	Iaroslavna Muntian (RUS)	Ruby Andrews (NZL)
2021	Krasnoyarsk	Alexandra Glazkova (RUS)	Michelle Rageth (SUI)	Kim Da-eun (KOR)
2022	Leysin	Kim Da-eun (KOR)	Kathryn Gray (USA)	Piper Arnold (USA)
2023	Cardrona	Cancelled		
2024–2025	Not contested			
2026	Calgary	Indra Brown (AUS)	Lainey Steen (USA)	Grete-Mia Meentalo (EST)

=== Slopestyle ===
Year	Location	Gold	Silver	Bronze
2010	Otago	Jamie Crane-Mauzy (USA)	Keltie Hansen (CAN)	Devin Logan (USA)
2012	Chiesa in Valmalenco	Devin Logan (USA)	Christianse Sjaastad (NOR)	Sandra Dejin (SWE)
2013	Chiesa in Valmalenco	Lisa Zimmermann (GER)	Alexi Micinski (USA)	Katie Summerhayes (GBR)
2014	Chiesa in Valmalenco	Katie Summerhayes (GBR)	Johanne Killi (NOR)	Sabrina Cakmakli (GER)
2015	Chiesa in Valmalenco	Nanaho Kiriyama (JPN)	Sandra Moestue Eie (NOR)	Caroline Claire (USA)
2017	Chiesa in Valmalenco	Kelly Sildaru (EST)	Jennie-Lee Burmansson (SWE)	Caroline Claire (USA)
2018	Cardrona	Kelly Sildaru (EST)	Anastasia Tatalina (RUS)	Kokone Kondo (JPN)
2019	Kläppen	Kelly Sildaru (EST)	Kirsty Muir (GBR)	Rell Harwood (USA)
2021	Krasnoyarsk	Ksenia Orlova (RUS)	Muriel Mohr (GER)	Michelle Rageth (SUI)
2022	Leysin	Ruby Anrews (NZL)	Jade Michaud (FRA)	Kathryn Gray (USA)
2023	Cardrona	Muriel Mohr (GER)	Flora Tabanelli (ITA)	Mischa Thomas (NZL)
2024	Livigno/Mottolino	Muriel Mohr (GER)	Eleanor Andrews (USA)	Avery Krumme (CAN)
2025	Not contested			
2026	Calgary	Lainey Steen (USA)	Hunter Belle Hall (CAN)	Maya Broadbent (AUS)

=== Big air ===
Year	Location	Gold	Silver	Bronze
2018	Kläppen	Anastasia Tatalina (RUS)	Kelly Sildaru (EST)	Lana Prusakova (RUS)
2019	Cardrona	Kelly Sildaru (EST)	Megan Oldham (CAN)	Kirsty Muir (GBR)
2021	Krasnoyarsk	Ksenia Orlova (RUS)	Muriel Mohr (GER)	Snezhana Prays (RUS)
2022	Leysin	Brynn Johnston (CAN)	Kathryn Gray (USA)	Jade Michaud (FRA)
2023	Cardrona	Flora Tabanelli (ITA)	Han Linshan (CHN)	Yang Ruyi (CHN)
2024	Livigno/Mottolino	Flora Tabanelli (ITA)	Muriel Mohr (GER)	Mariia Aniichyn (UKR)
2025	Not contested			
2026	Calgary	Lainey Steen (USA)	Emilie Lewis (FRA)	Maya Broadbent (AUS)

=== Rail event ===
Year	Location	Gold	Silver	Bronze
2026	Calgary	Lainey Steen (USA)	Ingvild Almaas Hagland (NOR)	Lillian Buszko (NOR)

== Mixed events ==
=== Team aerials ===
Year	Location	Gold	Silver	Bronze
2021	Krasnoyarsk	Russia I Anastasiia Prytkova; Artem Potapov; Arsenii Vagin	Belarus I Anna Derugo; Ihar Drabiankou; Makar Mitrafanau	Russia II; Eseniia Pantiukhova; Denis Sliadnev; Ildar Khakimov
2022	Chiesa in Valmalenco	United States I Kaila Kuhn; Connor Curran; Quinn Dehlinger	Canada I Flavie Aumond; Miha Fontaine; Émile Nadeau	Canada II; Rosalie Gagnon; Victor Primeau; Pierre-Olivier Cote
2023	Obertauern	China I Liu Xuanchi; Chen Shuo; Wang Guochen	United States I Amelia Glogowski; Connor Curran; Ian Schoenwald	Canada I Charlie Fontaine; Victor Primeau; Anthony Noel
2024	Chiesa in Valmalenco	Canada I Alexandra Montminy; Miha Fontaine; Alexandre Duchaine	China I Shen Jinyi; Yang Yuheng; Li Neng	Ukraine I Anhelina Brykina; Zakhar Maksymchuk; Maksym Kuznietsov
2025	Almaty	China II; Wang Qixian; Gu Jiubo; Geng Hu	China I Feng Junxi; Yang Zhicheng; Yang Yuheng	Canada; Victoria Cote; Elliot Primeau; Elliot Beauregard
2026	Airolo	Ukraine I Diana Yablonska; Mykyta Tarhonskyi; Roman Bondarchuk	Canada I Alexandra Montminy; Elliot Primeau; Elliot Beauregard	United States I Catherine Mceneany; Gavin Canzano; Beaudin Napolitano

=== Team dual moguls ===
Year	Location	Gold	Silver	Bronze
2022	Chiesa in Valmalenco	United States III; Alli Macuga; Jackson Crockett	Kazakhstan I Anastassiya Gorodko; Fedor Bugakov	United States I Kasey Hogg; Cole McDonald
2023	Chiesa in Valmalenco	United States; Alli Macuga; Asher Michel	Canada; Ashley Koehler; Jean-Christophe Bougie	Sweden; Moa Gustafson; Emil Holmgren
2024	Chiesa in Valmalenco	Cancelled		
2025	Almaty	United States 2 Reese Chapdelaine; Jiah Cohen	Kazakhstan 2 Yuliya Feklistova; Denys Rastruba	United States 3 Anabel Ayad; Chase Littlefield
2026	Airolo	Sweden 1 Nova Nilsson; Elis Moberg	United States 1 Eden Kruger; Camden Lewis	Canada 2 Citrine Boychuk; Simon Philippon Fugere

=== Team ski cross ===
Year	Location	Gold	Silver	Bronze
2021	Krasnoyarsk	Austria I Oliver Vierthaler; Christina Födermayr	Italy I Simone Deromedis; Andrea Chesi	Russia II; Andrei Gerasimov; Polina Ryabova
2022	Not held			
2023	San Pellegrino Pass	Switzerland I Robin Tissieres; Margaux Dumont	Canada I Nicholas Katrusiak; Emeline Bennett	France I Edgar Baillet; Mathilde Brodier
2024	Idre Fjäll	Germany I Till Hugenroth; Veronika Redder	Canada I Nicholas Katrusiak; Emeline Bennett	United States I Jack Mitchell; Morgan Shute
2025	Isola 2000	Germany I Nico Offenwanger; Veronika Redder	Germany II; Till Hugenroth; Leonie Bachl-Staudinger	Sweden I Sebastian Engelbrekts; Uma Kruse Een
2026	St. Moritz	Switzerland I Celien Crettex; Chiara Von Moos	Canada I Beckett Mars; Roxy Coatesworth	Germany II; Max Wizemann; Julia Machl

== All-time medal table ==
Updated after 2026 edition (excluding events in August in Cardrona).

Rank	Nation	Gold	Silver	Bronze	Total
1	United States	42	52	46	140
2	Russia	25	21	35	81
3	Canada	21	16	14	51
4	Sweden	17	15	12	44
5	Japan	13	9	7	29
6	Switzerland	12	10	16	38
7	Germany	11	11	10	32
8	China	9	11	9	29
9	France	8	13	13	34
10	Belarus	8	7	4	19
10	Kazakhstan	8	7	4	19
12	Norway	7	11	7	25
13	Estonia	7	1	3	11
14	Great Britain	5	5	7	17
15	New Zealand	5	4	2	11
16	Austria	4	5	2	11
17	Finland	3	4	6	13
18	Czech Republic	3	1	3	7
19	Ukraine	2	3	6	11
20	Italy	2	3	1	6
21	South Korea	1	4	3	8
22	Australia	1	2	3	6
23	Individual Neutral Athletes	1	0	1	2
24	Spain	0	0	1	1
Totals (24 entries)		215	215	215	645

== Most successful athletes ==
Updated after 2023 edition (excluding events in August in Cardrona).

=== Men ===
Rank	Athlete	Country	Discipline(s)	From	To	Gold	Silver	Bronze	Total
1	Thomas Rowley	United States	Moguls & Dual moguls	2013	2014	2	1	0	3
1	Beau-James Wells	New Zealand	Halfpipe & Slopestyle	2014	2015	2	1	0	3
1	Maxim Burov	Russia	Aerials	2014	2016	2	1	0	3
4	Filip Gravenfors	Sweden	Moguls & Dual moguls	2022	2023	2	0	2	4
5	Aleksey Pavlenko	Russia	Moguls & Dual moguls	2012	2015	2	0	1	3
6	Andrey Volkov	Russia	Moguls & Dual moguls	2006	2006	2	0	0	2
6	Maxim Gustik	Belarus	Aerials	2006	2007	2	0	0	2
6	Matěj Švancer	Czech Republic	Slopestyle & Big air	2021	2021	2	0	0	2
6	Wang Guochen	China	Aerials	2023	2023	2	0	0	2
6	Troy Podmilsak	United States	Slopestyle & Big air	2023	2023	2	0	0	2

=== Women ===
Rank	Athlete	Country	Discipline(s)	From	To	Gold	Silver	Bronze	Total
1	Kelly Sildaru	Estonia	Halfpipe, Slopestyle & Big air	2017	2019	6	1	0	7
2	Perrine Laffont	France	Moguls & Dual moguls	2014	2016	3	0	2	5
2	Alli Macuga	United States	Moguls & Dual moguls	2014	2016	3	0	2	5
4	Keaton McCargo	United States	Moguls & Dual moguls	2013	2014	3	0	1	4
5	Viktoriia Lazarenko	Russia	Moguls & Dual moguls	2018	2021	2	1	2	5
6	Ekaterina Stolyarova	Russia	Moguls & Dual moguls	2006	2007	2	1	0	3
6	Sandra Näslund	Sweden	Ski cross	2014	2017	2	1	0	3
8	Liubov Nikitina	Russia	Aerials	2014	2018	2	0	2	4
9	Alizée Boulangeat	France	Dual moguls & Ski cross	2006	2007	2	0	1	3
9	Yuliya Galysheva	Kazakhstan	Moguls & Dual moguls	2011	2012	2	0	1	3

== See also ==
- FIS Freestyle World Ski Championships
- FIS Snowboarding Junior World Championships
