= Freestyle skiing at the 2022 Winter Olympics – Women's moguls =

Women's moguls at the XXIV Olympic Winter Games
- Freestyle skiing
- Venue: Genting Snow Park, Zhangjiakou
- Date: 3, 6 February 2022
- Competitors: 30 from 11 nations
- Winning points: 83.09

Medalists
1st place, gold medalist(s)		Jakara Anthony	Australia
2nd place, silver medalist(s)		Jaelin Kauf	United States
3rd place, bronze medalist(s)		Anastasia Smirnova	ROC

The women's moguls competition in freestyle skiing at the 2022 Winter Olympics was held on 3 February (qualification) and 6 February (final), at the Genting Snow Park in Zhangjiakou. Jakara Anthony of Australia won the event, with Jaelin Kauf of the United States taking silver and Anastasia Smirnova, representing the Russian Olympic Committee, bronze. For all of them this was their first Olympic medal. Anthony's medal was the first Olympic medal for Australia in women's moguls.

The defending champion was Perrine Laffont. The silver medalist, who is also the 2014 Olympic champion, Justine Dufour-Lapointe, also qualified for the Olympics, as well as the bronze medalist, Yuliya Galysheva. At the 2021–22 FIS Freestyle Ski World Cup, before the Olympics Anri Kawamura led the ranking, followed by Laffont and Jakara Anthony. Laffont is also the 2021 world champion, with Galysheva and Anastasia Smirnova being the silver and the bronze medalist, respectively.

In the final, Anthony won with the season's best of 83.09 points. Kauf showed the fastest run, but lost to Anthony in air and turns. Smirnova became third, ahead of Laffont, Kawamura, and Olivia Giaccio.

== Qualification ==
A total of 30 moguls athletes qualified to compete at the games. For an athlete to compete they must have a minimum of 80.00 FIS points on the FIS Points List on January 17, 2022, and a top 30 finish in a World Cup event or at the FIS Freestyle Ski World Championships 2021. A country could enter a maximum of four athletes into the event.

== Results ==
=== Qualifications ===
==== Qualifying 1 ====
In the first qualifying round, the ten best athletes directly qualified for the final. The bottom twenty athletes go on to compete in the second qualification round.

Rank	Bib	Order	Name	Country	Time	Score			Total	Notes
Rank	Bib	Order	Name	Country	Time	Turns	Air	Time	Total	Notes
1	3	22	Jakara Anthony	Australia	27.96	50.0	17.26	16.49	83.75	QF
2	2	29	Perrine Laffont	France	27.81	48.4	16.05	16.66	81.11	QF
3	14	18	Jaelin Kauf	United States	26.97	47.9	13.64	17.61	79.15	QF
4	4	8	Olivia Giaccio	United States	29.56	48.0	15.42	14.69	78.11	QF
5	1	10	Anri Kawamura	Japan	28.33	49.8	10.49	16.07	76.36	QF
6	8	5	Junko Hoshino	Japan	28.53	46.9	12.63	15.85	75.38	QF
7	9	12	Hannah Soar	United States	29.25	45.0	14.49	15.04	74.53	QF
8	17	1	Anastasia Smirnova	ROC	28.84	45.7	11.81	15.50	73.01	QF
9	10	7	Britteny Cox	Australia	29.86	44.4	13.51	14.35	72.26	QF
10	13	17	Justine Dufour-Lapointe	Canada	29.29	45.8	10.66	14.99	71.45	QF
11	12	11	Chloé Dufour-Lapointe	Canada	28.85	43.5	11.32	15.49	70.31	
12	19	14	Makayla Gerken Schofield	Great Britain	29.13	42.9	12.11	15.17	70.18	
13	18	20	Sophie Ash	Australia	30.39	45.0	10.61	13.75	69.36	
14	16	13	Sofiane Gagnon	Canada	28.61	40.8	11.91	15.76	68.47	
15	5	3	Kisara Sumiyoshi	Japan	30.25	44.6	9.63	13.91	68.14	
16	20	24	Ayaulym Amrenova	Kazakhstan	29.97	42.3	10.29	14.23	66.82	
17	27	15	Polina Chudinova	ROC	29.94	40.7	11.81	14.26	66.77	
18	6	26	Hinako Tomitaka	Japan	30.01	41.5	9.40	14.18	65.08	
19	24	21	Li Nan	China	31.76	40.2	10.91	12.21	63.32	
20	21	2	Camille Cabrol	France	30.61	40.2	9.27	13.50	62.97	
21	25	28	Sabrina Cass	Brazil	32.13	40.7	9.71	11.79	62.20	
22	29	23	Anastasiia Pervushina	ROC	32.57	39.7	8.97	11.30	59.97	
23	28	16	Olessya Graur	Kazakhstan	33.29	33.6	13.09	10.49	57.18	
24	26	19	Katharina Ramsauer	Austria	31.94	35.4	8.77	12.01	56.18	
25	30	6	Viktoriia Lazarenko	ROC	32.57	8.0	10.35	11.30	29.65	
	15	30	Anastassiya Gorodko	Kazakhstan	Did Not Finish					
	22	9	Taylah O'Neill	Australia	Did Not Finish					
	23	27	Leonie Gerken Schofield	Great Britain	Did Not Finish					
	7	4	Kai Owens	United States	Did Not Start					
	11	25	Yuliya Galysheva	Kazakhstan	Did Not Start					

==== Qualifying 2 ====
In the second qualifying round, the ten best athletes qualify for the final based on that athletes best score from either the athlete's first or second qualifying run. The bottom ten athletes are eliminated.

Rank	Bib	Order	Name	Country	Qual 1	Time	Score			Total	Best	Notes
Rank	Bib	Order	Name	Country	Qual 1	Time	Turns	Air	Time	Total	Best	Notes
1	16	7	Sofiane Gagnon	Canada	68.47	28.39	46.0	13.62	16.01	75.63	75.63	QF
2	5	2	Kisara Sumiyoshi	Japan	68.14	28.50	44.8	11.90	15.88	72.58	72.58	QF
3	18	12	Sophie Ash	Australia	69.36	30.12	45.3	12.84	14.06	72.20	72.20	QF
4	6	17	Hinako Tomitaka	Japan	65.08	29.57	45.2	12.05	14.68	71.93	71.93	QF
5	27	9	Polina Chudinova	ROC	66.77	29.10	43.1	12.62	15.21	70.93	70.93	QF
6	12	6	Chloé Dufour-Lapointe	Canada	70.31	28.77	44.8	10.07	15.58	70.45	70.45	QF
7	19	8	Makayla Gerken Schofield	Great Britain	70.18	29.31	43.4	9.59	14.97	67.96	70.18	QF
8	7	3	Kai Owens	United States	DNS	29.67	41.0	14.36	14.56	69.92	69.92	QF
9	11	16	Yuliya Galysheva	Kazakhstan	DNS	30.47	42.4	13.15	13.66	69.21	69.21	QF
10	21	1	Camille Cabrol	France	62.97	30.75	42.1	12.31	13.35	67.76	67.76	QF
11	15	20	Anastassiya Gorodko	Kazakhstan	DNF	28.97	43.1	9.02	15.35	67.47	67.47	
12	20	15	Ayaulym Amrenova	Kazakhstan	66.82	30.45	40.3	11.79	13.69	65.78	66.82	
13	30	4	Viktoriia Lazarenko	ROC	29.65	31.71	39.4	14.10	12.27	65.77	65.77	
14	29	14	Anastasiia Pervushina	ROC	59.97	32.03	39.8	12.27	11.90	63.97	63.97	
15	24	13	Li Nan	China	63.32	46.17	0.3	10.37	0.00	10.67	63.32	
16	25	19	Sabrina Cass	Brazil	62.20	31.25	40.0	9.34	12.78	62.12	62.20	
17	23	18	Leonie Gerken Schofield	Great Britain	DNF	31.50	40.2	9.36	12.50	62.06	62.06	
18	28	10	Olessya Graur	Kazakhstan	57.18	32.05	22.0	4.60	11.88	38.48	57.18	
19	26	11	Katharina Ramsauer	Austria	56.18	31.04	34.3	8.44	13.02	55.76	56.18	
	22	5	Taylah O'Neill	Australia	DNF	Did Not Start					DNF	

=== Final ===
==== Final 1 ====
In the first final round, the twelve best athletes qualified for the second final round. The bottom eight athletes are eliminated.

Rank	Bib	Order	Name	Country	Time	Score			Total	Notes
Rank	Bib	Order	Name	Country	Time	Turns	Air	Time	Total	Notes
1	3	20	Jakara Anthony	Australia	27.70	47.6	17.53	16.78	81.91	Q
2	1	16	Anri Kawamura	Japan	27.90	48.3	15.86	16.56	80.72	Q
3	2	19	Perrine Laffont	France	27.73	46.7	16.41	16.75	79.86	Q
4	14	18	Jaelin Kauf	United States	27.00	47.1	14.65	17.57	79.32	Q
5	4	17	Olivia Giaccio	United States	29.73	47.3	16.57	14.50	78.37	Q
6	7	3	Kai Owens	United States	28.34	44.9	14.30	16.06	75.26	Q
7	11	2	Yuliya Galysheva	Kazakhstan	29.61	45.1	15.24	14.63	74.97	Q
8	16	10	Sofiane Gagnon	Canada	28.36	45.3	13.10	16.04	74.44	Q
9	19	4	Makayla Gerken Schofield	Great Britain	28.76	44.9	13.50	15.59	73.99	Q
10	17	13	Anastasia Smirnova	ROC	28.10	46.4	11.03	16.33	73.76	Q
11	9	14	Hannah Soar	United States	29.70	44.8	14.37	14.53	73.70	Q
12	12	5	Chloé Dufour-Lapointe	Canada	28.93	45.1	13.10	15.40	73.60	Q
13	8	15	Junko Hoshino	Japan	28.73	44.4	13.17	15.62	73.19	
14	10	12	Britteny Cox	Australia	30.04	46.0	12.89	14.15	73.04	
15	5	9	Kisara Sumiyoshi	Japan	28.71	44.2	11.67	15.65	71.52	
16	18	8	Sophie Ash	Australia	30.57	44.0	12.92	13.55	70.47	
17	27	6	Polina Chudinova	ROC	29.03	42.7	12.37	15.29	70.36	
18	21	1	Camille Cabrol	France	30.03	43.9	12.25	14.16	70.31	
19	6	7	Hinako Tomitaka	Japan	29.87	44.8	10.85	14.34	69.99	
	13	11	Justine Dufour-Lapointe	Canada	Did not finish					

==== Final 2 ====
In the second final round, the six best athletes qualified for the third final round. The bottoms six athletes are eliminated.

Rank	Bib	Order	Name	Country	Time	Score			Total	Notes
Rank	Bib	Order	Name	Country	Time	Turns	Air	Time	Total	Notes
1	3	12	Jakara Anthony	Australia	27.82	46.9	17.74	16.65	81.29	Q
2	14	9	Jaelin Kauf	United States	26.49	46.6	15.37	18.15	80.12	Q
3	1	11	Anri Kawamura	Japan	28.37	47.7	15.11	16.03	78.84	Q
4	17	3	Anastasia Smirnova	ROC	27.95	46.9	15.24	16.50	78.64	Q
5	2	10	Perrine Laffont	France	27.93	45.7	15.40	16.52	77.62	Q
6	4	8	Olivia Giaccio	United States	29.50	46.5	16.31	14.76	77.57	Q
7	9	2	Hannah Soar	United States	28.95	45.1	14.68	15.38	75.16	
8	19	4	Makayla Gerken Schofield	Great Britain	28.59	44.8	12.46	15.78	73.04	
9	12	1	Chloé Dufour-Lapointe	Canada	28.65	44.8	12.45	15.71	72.96	
10	7	7	Kai Owens	United States	28.54	36.4	13.25	15.84	65.49	
11	11	6	Yuliya Galysheva	Kazakhstan	29.83	32.3	3.06	14.38	49.74	
	16	5	Sofiane Gagnon	Canada	Did not finish					

==== Final 3 ====
The third final round determined the medal winners amongst the final six athletes.

Rank	Bib	Order	Name	Country	Time	Score			Total	Notes
Rank	Bib	Order	Name	Country	Time	Turns	Air	Time	Total	Notes
1st place, gold medalist(s)	3	6	Jakara Anthony	Australia	27.63	48.1	18.13	16.86	83.09	
2nd place, silver medalist(s)	14	5	Jaelin Kauf	United States	26.37	46.9	15.10	18.28	80.28	
3rd place, bronze medalist(s)	17	3	Anastasia Smirnova	ROC	27.59	45.9	14.91	16.91	77.72	
4	2	2	Perrine Laffont	France	28.04	45.6	15.36	16.40	77.36	
5	1	4	Anri Kawamura	Japan	28.00	46.3	14.37	16.45	77.12	
6	4	1	Olivia Giaccio	United States	29.60	45.9	15.07	14.64	75.61	
