= Macuga =

Macuga (Polish: [maˈtsuga]) is a Polish surname. Mačuga (Slovak: [ˈmat͡ʃuɡa]) is a Slovak surname.

Notable people with the surname include:

- Alli Macuga (born 2003), American freestyle skier
- Goshka Macuga (born 1967), Polish-British artist
- Lauren Macuga (born 2002), American ski racer
- Sam Macuga (born 2001), American ski jumper
