= FIS Freestyle Ski and Snowboarding World Championships 2023 – Men's aerials =

Men's aerials at the FIS Freestyle Ski and Snowboarding World Championships 2023
- Location: Bakuriani, Georgia
- Dates: 23 February
- Competitors: 24 from 7 nations
- Winning points: 118.59

Medalists
gold medal	Noé Roth	Switzerland
silver medal	Quinn Dehlinger	United States
bronze medal	Yang Longxiao	China

The Men's aerials competition at the FIS Freestyle Ski and Snowboarding World Championships 2023 was held on 23 February 2023.

== Qualification ==
The qualification was started on 23 February at 10:00.

Rank	Bib	Start order	Name	Country	Result	Notes
1	3	16	Christopher Lillis	United States	124.43	Q
2	12	1	Li Tianma	China	119.46	Q
3	17	6	Oleksandr Okipniuk	Ukraine	119.03	Q
4	23	13	Yang Longxiao	China	114.48	Q
5	18	5	Justin Schoenefeld	United States	108.60	Q
6	1	12	Noé Roth	Switzerland	107.69	Q
7	13	24	Émile Nadeau	Canada	107.24	Q
8	14	19	Sherzod Kashyrbayev	Kazakhstan	106.79	Q
9	10	20	Nicolas Gygax	Switzerland	106.11	Q
10	8	22	Volodymyr Kushnir	Ukraine	104.89	Q
11	6	2	Quinn Dehlinger	United States	104.07	Q
12	5	9	Alexandre Duchaine	Canada	103.54	Q
13	15	3	Chen Shuo	China	101.01	
14	20	10	Wang Guochen	China	100.84	
15	2	8	Dmytro Kotovskyi	Ukraine	100.44	
16	9	4	Maksym Kuznietsov	Ukraine	91.53	
17	11	17	Miha Fontaine	Canada	88.05	
18	21	7	Dinmukhammed Raimkulov	Kazakhstan	87.57	
19	4	21	Pirmin Werner	Switzerland	84.51	
20	16	15	Nicholas Novak	Czech Republic	81.40	
21	7	23	Andrin Schädler	Switzerland	70.06	
22	22	18	Roman Ivanov	Kazakhstan	61.33	
23	19	11	Derek Krueger	United States	57.96	
24	24	14	Ulanbakir Umurzakov	Kazakhstan	46.98	

== Final ==
The first run was started at 12:50 and the second run at 13:26.

Rank	Bib	Name	Country	Final 1	Final 2
1st place, gold medalist(s)	1	Noé Roth	Switzerland	93.21	118.59
2nd place, silver medalist(s)	6	Quinn Dehlinger	United States	93.36	114.48
3rd place, bronze medalist(s)	23	Yang Longxiao	China	98.64	110.18
4	3	Christopher Lillis	United States	118.14	107.24
5	12	Li Tianma	China	119.00	69.91
6	8	Volodymyr Kushnir	Ukraine	101.65	56.11
7	14	Sherzod Khashyrbayev	Kazakhstan	85.86	—
8	18	Justin Schoenefeld	United States	85.84	—
9	17	Oleksandr Okipniuk	Ukraine	77.37	—
10	13	Émile Nadeau	Canada	55.65	—
11	5	Alexandre Duchaine	Canada	25.22	—
12	10	Nicolas Gygax	Switzerland	DNF	—
