= FIS Freestyle Ski and Snowboarding World Championships 2023 – Men's moguls =

Men's moguls at the FIS Freestyle Ski and Snowboarding World Championships 2023
- Location: Bakuriani, Georgia
- Dates: 25 February
- Competitors: 44 from 14 nations

Medalists
gold medal	Mikaël Kingsbury	Canada
silver medal	Matt Graham	Australia
bronze medal	Walter Wallberg	Sweden

The Men's moguls competition at the FIS Freestyle Ski and Snowboarding World Championships 2023 was held on 25 February 2023.

== Qualification ==
The qualification was started at 11:45. The best 18 skiers qualified for the final.

Rank	Bib	Start order	Name	Country	Q1	Q2	Notes
1	1	19	Mikaël Kingsbury	Canada	87.38		Q
2	6	18	Benjamin Cavet	France	86.35		Q
3	2	24	Ikuma Horishima	Japan	85.54		Q
4	3	2	Walter Wallberg	Sweden	82.42		Q
5	4	22	Matt Graham	Australia	81.37		Q
6	20	9	Jimi Salonen	Finland	81.22		Q
7	21	5	Martin Suire	France	80.80		Q
8	5	27	Nick Page	United States	80.34		Q
9	30	10	Brenden Kelly	United States	80.27		Q
10	8	6	Filip Gravenfors	Sweden	77.22	82.98	Q
11	10	12	Pavel Kolmakov	Kazakhstan	70.73	82.70	Q
12	12	21	Kosuke Sugimoto	Japan	76.24	81.57	Q
13	15	28	So Matsuda	Japan	77.54	81.37	Q
14	13	20	Julien Viel	Canada	64.78	80.17	Q
15	17	25	Olli Penttala	Finland	69.61	79.63	Q
16	11	7	Elliot Vaillancourt	Canada	76.63	78.74	Q
17	16	29	Cooper Woods	Australia	78.73	70.82	Q
18	26	16	Jung Dae-yoon	South Korea	72.12	78.57	Q
19	19	4	Gabriel Dufresne	Canada	74.92	77.80	
20	23	3	Dylan Marcellini	United States	77.57	76.65	
21	27	23	Mateo Jeannesson	Great Britain	43.58	76.94	
22	25	1	Albin Holmgren	Sweden	76.52	69.73	
23	14	6	Yutaro Murata	Japan	75.87	72.02	
24	9	11	Dylan Walczyk	United States	73.91	74.82	
25	22	8	William Feneley	Great Britain	73.82	DNF	
27	35	41	Rasmus Karjalainen	Finland	67.17	71.43	
28	18	15	Jackson Harvey	Australia	71.22	66.19	
29	34	40	Enea Buzzi	Switzerland	64.18	70.40	
30	7	30	Cole McDonald	United States	DNF	68.24	
31	16	29	Marius Bourdette	France	66.94	67.36	
32	32	13	Anton Bondarev	Kazakhstan	28.95	67.10	
33	29	42	Thomas Gerken Schofield	Great Britain	65.54	66.50	
34	42	39	Lee Yoon-seung	South Korea	DNF	65.26	
35	36	43	Li Musai	China	55.12	59.07	
36	33	34	Martino Conedera	Switzerland	34.23	58.68	
37	28	14	Emil Holmgren	Sweden	31.14	57.16	
38	38	31	Baek Hyun-min	South Korea	3.60	56.63	
39	39	32	Wang Renda	China	48.03	52.91	
40	40	38	Nicolas Weese	Germany	49.83	DNF	
41	43	36	Fu Junyi	China	40.46	45.92	
42	44	37	Linus Merz	Germany	45.56	DNF	
43	37	35	Paolo Pascarella	Switzerland	38.35	DNF	
44	41	44	Marek Gajdečka	Czech Republic	31.85	DNF	

== Final ==
Rank	Bib	Name	Country	Final 1	Final 2
1st place, gold medalist(s)	1	Mikaël Kingsbury	Canada	89.10	89.82
2nd place, silver medalist(s)	4	Matt Graham	Australia	85.60	88.90
3rd place, bronze medalist(s)	3	Walter Wallberg	Sweden	88.20	88.52
4	10	Pavel Kolmakov	Kazakhstan	84.15	83.99
5	2	Ikuma Horishima	Japan	88.15	80.07
6	6	Benjamin Cavet	France	87.54	79.21
7	21	Martin Suire	France	83.79	—
8	12	Kosuke Sugimoto	Japan	82.56	—
9	8	Filip Gravenfors	Sweden	82.05	—
10	26	Jung Dae-yoon	South Korea	81.00	—
11	16	Cooper Woods	Australia	80.50	—
12	11	Elliot Vaillancourt	Canada	80.49	—
13	30	Brenden Kelly	United States	80.18	—
14	13	Julien Viel	Canada	80.13	—
15	5	Nick Page	United States	77.59	—
16	20	Jimi Salonen	Finland	67.55	—
17	15	So Matsuda	Japan	28.18	—
18	17	Olli Penttala	Finland	DNF	—
