= FIS Freestyle Ski and Snowboarding World Championships 2023 – Men's dual moguls =

Men's dual moguls at the FIS Freestyle Ski and Snowboarding World Championships 2023
- Location: Bakuriani, Georgia
- Dates: 26 February

Medalists
gold medal	Mikaël Kingsbury	Canada
silver medal	Walter Wallberg	Sweden
bronze medal	Matt Graham	Australia

The Men's dual moguls competition at the FIS Freestyle Ski and Snowboarding World Championships 2023 was held on 26 February 2023.

== Results ==
Semifinals
1	(Canada) Mikaël Kingsbury	18
10	(Kazakhstan) Pavel Kolmakov	17
3	(Sweden) Walter Wallberg	21
4	(Australia) Matt Graham	14

Finals
1	(Canada) Mikaël Kingsbury	19
3	(Sweden) Walter Wallberg	16
Third place
10	(Kazakhstan) Pavel Kolmakov	15
4	(Australia) Matt Graham	20

=== Top half ===
==== Section 1 ====
Round of 64
11	(Canada) Elliot Vaillancourt	28
33	(Switzerland) Martino Conedera	7
44	(Germany) Linus Merz	10
31	(Australia) George Murphy	25
36	(China) Li Musai	DNF
14	(Japan) Yutaro Murata	35

Round of 32
1	(Canada) Mikaël Kingsbury	19.50
11	(Canada) Elliot Vaillancourt	15.50
23	(United States) Dylan Marcellini	19
9	(United States) Dylan Walczyk	16
21	(France) Martin Suire	17
31	(Australia) George Murphy	18
14	(Japan) Yutaro Murata	13
6	(France) Benjamin Cavet	22

Round of 16
1	(Canada) Mikaël Kingsbury	24
23	(United States) Dylan Marcellini	11
31	(Australia) George Murphy	8
6	(France) Benjamin Cavet	27

Quarterfinals
1	(Canada) Mikaël Kingsbury	24
6	(France) Benjamin Cavet	11

==== Section 2 ====
Round of 64
39	(China) Wang Renda	12
22	(United Kingdom) William Feneley	23
18	(Australia) Jackson Harvey	28
42	(South Korea) Lee Yoon-seung
35	(Finland) Rasmus Karajalainen	35
40	(Germany) Nicolas Weese

Round of 32
10	(Kazakhstan) Pavel Kolmakov	23
22	(United Kingdom) William Feneley	12
18	(Australia) Jackson Harvey	16
16	(Australia) Cooper Woods	19
7	(United States) Cole McDonald	15
19	(Canada) Gabriel Dufresne	20
35	(Finland) Rasmus Karajalainen	23
2	(Japan) Ikuma Horishima	12

Round of 16
10	(Kazakhstan) Pavel Kolmakov	18
16	(Australia) Cooper Woods	17
19	(Canada) Gabriel Dufresne	22
35	(Finland) Rasmus Karajalainen	13

Quarterfinals
10	(Kazakhstan) Pavel Kolmakov	20
19	(Canada) Gabriel Dufresne	15

=== Bottom half ===
==== Section 3 ====
Round of 64
17	(Finland) Olli Penttala	29
43	(China) Fu Junyi
38	(South Korea) Baek Hyun-min
15	(Japan) So Matsuda	35
24	(France) Marius Bourdette	17
32	(Kazakhstan) Anton Bondarev	18

Round of 32
3	(Sweden) Walter Wallberg	20
17	(Finland) Olli Penttala	15
28	(Sweden) Emil Holmgren	15
26	(South Korea) Jung Dae-yoon	20
13	(Canada) Julien Viel	31
15	(Japan) So Matsuda	4
32	(Kazakhstan) Anton Bondarev	11
8	(Sweden) Filip Gravenfors	24

Round of 16
3	(Sweden) Walter Wallberg	19
26	(South Korea) Jung Dae-yoon	16
13	(Canada) Julien Viel	DNF
8	(Sweden) Filip Gravenfors	35

Quarterfinals
3	(Sweden) Walter Wallberg	26
8	(Sweden) Filip Gravenfors	9

==== Section 4 ====
Round of 64
34	(Switzerland) Enea Buzzi	10
22	(United Kingdom) Mateo Jeannesson	25
37	(Switzerland) Paolo Pascarella	11
20	(Finland) Jimi Salonen	24
41	(Czech Republic) Marek Gajdečka	3
29	(United Kingdom) Thomas Gerken Schofield	32

Round of 32
5	(United States) Nick Page	20
22	(United Kingdom) Mateo Jeannesson	15
20	(Finland) Jimi Salonen	35
25	(Sweden) Albin Holmgren	DNF
12	(Japan) Kosuke Sugimoto	35
30	(United States) Brenden Kelly	DNF
29	(United Kingdom) Thomas Gerken Schofield	11
4	(Australia) Matt Graham	24

Round of 16
5	(United States) Nick Page	34
20	(Finland) Jimi Salonen	1
12	(Japan) Kosuke Sugimoto	8
4	(Australia) Matt Graham	27

Quarterfinals
5	(United States) Nick Page	10
4	(Australia) Matt Graham	25
