= Redder =

Redder is a surname. Notable people with the surname include:

- Theodor Redder (born 1941), German football player
- Veronika Redder (born 2004), German freestyle skier
