= Freestyle skiing at the 2025 Asian Winter Games – Men's aerials =

Men's aerials at the 2025 Asian Winter Games
- Venue: Yabuli Ski Resort
- Dates: 9 February 2025
- Competitors: 8 from 3 nations

Medalists
gold medal	Li Xinpeng	China
silver medal	Yang Longxiao	China
bronze medal	Qi Guangpu	China

The men's aerials at the 2025 Asian Winter Games was held on 9 February 2025 at Yabuli Ski Resort in Harbin, China.

== Schedule ==
All times are China Standard Time (UTC+08:00)

Date	Time	Event
Sunday, 9 February 2025	11:50	Final 1
Sunday, 9 February 2025	12:30	Final 2

== Results ==
Legend

- DNS — Did not start

=== Final 1 ===
Rank	Athlete	Jump 1	Jump 2	Best
1	Qi Guangpu (CHN)	124.78	DNS	124.78
2	Li Xinpeng (CHN)	44.25	104.49	104.49
3	Yang Yuheng (CHN)	93.06	91.65	93.06
4	Yang Longxiao (CHN)	87.61	90.72	90.72
5	Assylkhan Assan (KAZ)	88.83	90.48	90.48
6	Ulanbakir Umurzakov (KAZ)	52.17	86.31	86.31
7	Haruto Igarashi (JPN)	77.49	72.96	77.49
8	Roman Ivanov (KAZ)	64.86	64.50	64.86

=== Final 2 ===
Rank	Athlete	Score
1st place, gold medalist(s)	Li Xinpeng (CHN)	123.45
2nd place, silver medalist(s)	Yang Longxiao (CHN)	122.13
3rd place, bronze medalist(s)	Qi Guangpu (CHN)	119.47
4	Yang Yuheng (CHN)	102.57
5	Ulanbakir Umurzakov (KAZ)	81.90
6	Assylkhan Assan (KAZ)	71.76
