= Anastasia Smirnova (freestyle skier) =

Russian freestyle skier

Personal information
- Full name: Anastasia Andreyevna Smirnova
- Nationality: Russian
- Born: 31 August 2002 (age 23) Chusovoy, Russia

Sport
- Country: Russia
- Sport: Freestyle skiing
- Event: Moguls
Medal record
Women's freestyle skiing
Representing ROC
Olympic Games
Bronze medal – third place	2022 Beijing	Moguls
Representing Russian Ski Federation
World Championships
Gold medal – first place	2021 Almaty	Dual moguls
Bronze medal – third place	2021 Almaty	Moguls
Representing Russia
Junior World Championships
Gold medal – first place	2019 Chiesa in Valmalenco	Dual moguls
Silver medal – second place	2017 Chiesa in Valmalenco	Moguls
Bronze medal – third place	2017 Chiesa in Valmalenco	Dual moguls
Bronze medal – third place	2021 Krasnoyarsk	Moguls
Bronze medal – third place	2021 Krasnoyarsk	Dual moguls

Anastasia Andreyevna Smirnova (Russian: Анастасия Андреевна Смирнова; born 31 August 2002) is a Russian freestyle skier. She is a 2021 World Champion in dual moguls.

== Career ==
She competed at the FIS Freestyle Ski and Snowboarding World Championships 2019, where she placed fourth in the moguls. She won her first medal at the FIS Freestyle World Ski Championships in 2021, in moguls, and a second medal in dual moguls, after she finished first in the final run where she competed with teammate Viktoriia Lazarenko. She is the first Russian dual moguls champion.

== World Cup podiums ==
=== Individual podiums ===
- 0 wins – (0 MO, 0 DM)
- 3 podiums – (2 MO, 1 DM)

Season	Date	Location	Place
2019–20	25 January 2020	Mont-Tremblant, Canada	3rd
2020–21	4 December 2020	Ruka, Finland	3rd
2021–22	18 December 2021	Alpe d'Huez, France	2nd
