= FIS Freestyle Ski and Snowboarding World Championships 2019 – Mixed team aerials =

Mixed team aerials at the FIS Freestyle Ski and Snowboarding World Championships 2019
- Venue: Deer Valley
- Location: Utah, United States
- Dates: February 7
- Competitors: 24 from 8 nations
- Teams: 8
- Winning points: 303.08

Medalists
gold medal	Carol Bouvard; Nicolas Gygax; Noé Roth	Switzerland
silver medal	Xu Mengtao; Sun Jiaxu; Wang Xindi	China
bronze medal	Liubov Nikitina; Stanislav Nikitin; Maxim Burov	Russia

The Mixed team aerials competition at the FIS Freestyle Ski and Snowboarding World Championships 2019 was held on February 7, 2019.

== Results ==
The final was started at 19:00.

Rank	Bib	Country	Final 1	Final 2
1st place, gold medalist(s)	8; 81; 82; 83	Switzerland; Carol Bouvard; Nicolas Gygax; Noé Roth	279.45; 72.13; 96.46; 110.86	303.08; 73.71; 121.68; 107.69
2nd place, silver medalist(s)	1; 11; 12; 13	China; Xu Mengtao; Sun Jiaxu; Wang Xindi	269.78; 78.25; 106.92; 84.61	297.82; 77.19; 108.41; 112.22
3rd place, bronze medalist(s)	6; 61; 62; 63	Russia; Liubov Nikitina; Stanislav Nikitin; Maxim Burov	286.24; 77.80; 109.35; 99.09	296.74; 85.68; 93.36; 117.70
4	3; 31; 32; 33	Belarus; Aliaksandra Ramanouskaya; Anton Kushnir; Maxim Gustik	273.94; 82.36; 102.66; 88.92	272.15; 81.36; 114.03; 76.76
5	7; 71; 72; 73	Canada; Catrine Lavallée; Miha Fontaine; Félix Cormier-Boucher	244.56; 77.49; 83.16; 83.91	
6	4; 41; 42; 43	United States; Ashley Caldwell; Christopher Lillis; Jonathon Lillis	227.18; 74.97; 62.83; 89.38	
7	2; 21; 22; 23	Australia; Brittany George; Laura Peel; David Morris	218.29; 70.56; 77.49; 70.24	
8	5; 51; 52; 53	Kazakhstan; Akmarzhan Kalmurzayeva; Zhanbota Aldabergenova; Baglan Inkarbek	178.00; 39.15; 85.30; 53.55	
