= FIS Freestyle Ski and Snowboarding World Championships 2021 – Women's dual moguls =

Women's dual moguls at the FIS Freestyle Ski and Snowboarding World Championships 2021
- Venue: Shymbulak
- Location: Almaty, Kazakhstan
- Date: 9 March
- Competitors: 32 from 13 nations

Medalists
gold medal	Anastasiia Smirnova
silver medal	Viktoriia Lazarenko
bronze medal	Anastassiya Gorodko	Kazakhstan

The Women's dual moguls competition at the FIS Freestyle Ski and Snowboarding World Championships 2021 was held on 9 March 2021.

== Results ==
=== Finals ===
Semifinals
19	(Russia) Viktoriia Lazarenko	84.51
26	(Canada) Sofiane Gagnon	72.42
13	(Russia) Anastasiia Smirnova	77.93
23	(Kazakhstan) Anastassiya Gorodko	61.98

Finals
19	(Russia) Viktoriia Lazarenko	75.92
13	(Russia) Anastasiia Smirnova	83.08
Third place
26	(Canada) Sofiane Gagnon	78.62
23	(Kazakhstan) Anastassiya Gorodko	79.42

=== Top half ===
==== Section 1 ====
Round of 64
33	(Germany) Lena Mayer	69.51
37	(Czech Republic) Dorota Šamánková	36.26

Round of 32
1	(France) Perrine Laffont	82.79
33	(Germany) Lena Mayer	DNF
28	(Kazakhstan) Ayaulym Amrenova	65.63
7	(Japan) Hinako Tomitaka	80.92
19	(Russia) Viktoriia Lazarenko	80.32
41	(Austria) Katharina Ramsauer	47.27
27	(Russia) Anastasiia Pervushina	69.35
10	(Australia) Jakara Anthony	79.06

Round of 16
1	(France) Perrine Laffont	83.88
7	(Japan) Hinako Tomitaka	74.74
19	(Russia) Viktoriia Lazarenko	82.45
10	(Australia) Jakara Anthony	79.42

Quarterfinals
1	(France) Perrine Laffont	70.13
19	(Russia) Viktoriia Lazarenko	82.91

==== Section 2 ====
Round of 64

Round of 32
3	(United States) Hannah Soar	79.67
34	(Switzerland) Nicole Gasparini	35.83
36	(Germany) Sophie Weese	56.91
12	(United Kingdom) Makayla Gerken Schofield	76.09
11	(Japan) Junko Hoshino	78.10
26	(Canada) Sofiane Gagnon	78.83
40	(Kazakhstan) Olessya Graur	61.60
5	(United States) Jaelin Kauf	76.08

Round of 16
3	(United States) Hannah Soar	84.84
12	(United Kingdom) Makayla Gerken Schofield	76.56
26	(Canada) Sofiane Gagnon	81.99
5	(United States) Jaelin Kauf	77.98

Quarterfinals
3	(United States) Hannah Soar	76.87
26	(Canada) Sofiane Gagnon	77.52

=== Bottom half ===
==== Section 3 ====
Round of 64

Round of 32
2	(Japan) Anri Kawamura	DNS
31	(Russia) Ekaterina Ogneva
25	(Canada) Chloé Dufour-Lapointe	76.42
6	(United States) Tess Johnson	80.44
9	(Canada) Justine Dufour-Lapointe	78.43
39	(Ukraine) Yuliia Brudko	24.95
32	(United Kingdom) Skyler Nunn	58.51
13	(Russia) Anastasiia Smirnova	78.75

Round of 16
31	(Russia) Ekaterina Ogneva	68.18
6	(United States) Tess Johnson	80.70
9	(Canada) Justine Dufour-Lapointe	82.01
13	(Russia) Anastasiia Smirnova	82.91

Quarterfinals
6	(United States) Tess Johnson	79.46
13	(Russia) Anastasiia Smirnova	82.87

==== Section 4 ====
Round of 64
30	(Austria) Melanie Meilinger
35	(Czech Republic) Eliška Coufalová	DNS

Round of 32
4	(United States) Kai Owens	83.00
18	(France) Camille Cabrol	73.85
29	(Germany) Hanna Weese	50.16
8	(Japan) Kisara Sumiyoshi	76.81
15	(Australia) Britteny Cox	76.59
23	(Kazakhstan) Anastassiya Gorodko	76.67
30	(Austria) Melanie Meilinger	59.05
14	(Kazakhstan) Yuliya Galysheva	84.98

Round of 16
4	(United States) Kai Owens	80.50
8	(Japan) Kisara Sumiyoshi	80.56
23	(Kazakhstan) Anastassiya Gorodko	78.78
14	(Kazakhstan) Yuliya Galysheva	73.92

Quarterfinals
8	(Japan) Kisara Sumiyoshi	DNF
23	(Kazakhstan) Anastassiya Gorodko	80.59
