= Li Xinpeng =

Chinese freestyle skier (born 2005)

Personal information
- Born: 2 February 2005 (age 21)

Sport
- Country: China
- Sport: Freestyle skiing
- Event: Aerials
Medal record
Men's freestyle skiing
Representing China
Asian Games
Gold medal – first place	2025 Harbin	Aerials
Gold medal – first place	2025 Harbin	Mixed team aerials
Bronze medal – third place	2025 Harbin	Synchro aerials

Li Xinpeng (Chinese: 李心鹏, born 2 February 2005) is a Chinese freestyle skier specializing in aerials.

== Career ==
Li represented China at the 2025 Asian Winter Games and won a gold medal in the aerials event with a score of 123.45, and a gold medal in the mixed team aerials. He also won a bronze medal in the synchro aerials event, along with Qi Guangpu.

During the 2025–26 FIS Freestyle Ski World Cup, Li earned his first career World Cup victory on 12 January 2026 with a score of 137.19.
