= Nadiya Didenko =

Ukrainian freestyle skier (born 1986)

Personal information
- Born: March 7, 1986 (age 40) Ivano-Frankivsk, Ukrainian SSR, Soviet Union

Sport
- Sport: Skiing

World Cup career
- Indiv. podiums: 1
Medal record
Women's Freestyle skiing
Representing Ukraine
Junior World Championships
Gold medal – first place	2006 Krasnoe Ozero	Aerials
- Updated on July 24, 2013

Nadiya Didenko (born March 7, 1986) is a Ukrainian freestyle skier, specializing in aerials.

== Career ==
Didenko competed at the 2006 and 2010 Winter Olympics for Ukraine. Her best finish came in 2010, placing 13th in the qualifying round of the aerials, failing to advance to the final. In 2006, she placed 8th.

As of April 2013, her best showing at the World Championships is 9th, in 2013.

Didenko made her World Cup debut in February 2005. As of April 2013, she has one World Cup podium finish, taking silver at Bukovel in 2012/13. Her best World Cup overall finish in aerials is 7th, in 2010/11 and 2012/13.

== Performances ==
Level	Year	Event	Aerials
FWSCH	2005	Rukatunturi, Finland	22
FJWSCH	2006	Krasnoe Ozero, Russia	1
OLY	2006	Turin, Italy	20
FWSCH	2007	Madonna di Campiglio, Italy	14
FWSCH	2009	Inawashiro, Japan	12
OLY	2010	Vancouver, Canada	13
FWSCH	2011	Deer Valley, United States	14
FWSCH	2013	Voss, Norway	9

=== World Cup ===
==== Podiums ====
Season	Place	Placement
2012–13	Bukovel, Ukraine	2

==== Positions ====
Season	Aerials	Overall
2004–05	30	90
2005–06	17	51
2006–07	13	31
2007–08	15	48
2008–09	17	53
2009–10	10	31
2010–11	7	25
2011–12	8	27
2012–13	7	24
2013–14	34	186
