= Freestyle skiing at the 2025 Asian Winter Games – Men's aerials synchro =

Men's aerials synchro at the 2025 Asian Winter Games
- Venue: Yabuli Ski Resort
- Dates: 11 February 2025
- Competitors: 10 from 3 nations

Medalists
gold medal	Roman Ivanov; Sherzod Khashirbayev	Kazakhstan
silver medal	Geng Hu; Yang Yuheng	China
bronze medal	Li Xinpeng; Qi Guangpu	China

The men's aerials synchro at the 2025 Asian Winter Games was held on 11 February 2025 at Yabuli Ski Resort in Harbin, China.

== Schedule ==
All times are China Standard Time (UTC+08:00)

Date	Time	Event
Tuesday, 11 February 2025	12:04	Final

== Results ==
Rank	Team	Jump 1	Jump 2	Best
1st place, gold medalist(s)	Kazakhstan (KAZ); Roman Ivanov; Sherzod Khashirbayev	75.71	97.92	97.92
2nd place, silver medalist(s)	China (CHN); Geng Hu; Yang Yuheng	78.25	93.48	93.48
3rd place, bronze medalist(s)	China (CHN); Li Xinpeng; Qi Guangpu	91.57	88.19	91.57
4	Kazakhstan (KAZ); Assylkhan Assan; Dinmukhammed Raimkulov	83.96	70.42	83.96
5	Japan (JPN); Haruto Igarashi; Yuta Nakagawa	55.96	55.10	55.96
