= Rohan Chapman-Davies =

Australian freestyle skier

Personal information
- Nationality: Australian
- Born: 4 September 1991 (age 35) Sydney, New South Wales, Australia
- Height: 1.86 m (6 ft 1 in)

Sport
- Sport: Freestyle skiing

Rohan Chapman-Davies (born 4 September 1991) is an Australian freestyle skier. He competed in the 2018 Winter Olympics.

Chapman-Davies scored a 73.96 in his first qualification run at the Olympic Games at PyeongChang in 2018. Chapman-Davies scored a 67.94 in his second qualification run at the Olympic Games at PyeongChang. He finished his debut Olympic Games in 22nd place.

== Skiing career ==
In 2008, Chapman-Davies attending his first international meet, representing Australia in the North American Cup event held in Canada. He placed 42nd in the meet. He didn't try for that meet until 2015. This time, Chapman-Davies finishing 3rd, becoming the first Australian male to podium in the grand prix standings.

In 2014, Chapman-Davies won two silver medals and one bronze in both Australian and New Zealand Cup series. Unfortunately, those results weren't enough for him to qualify for the 2014 Winter Olympic Games in Sochi.

By the 2016/17 season, Chapman-Davies had an impressive season. He competed in the World Cup circuit, making two final appearances in Ruka, Finland and Val St Come, Canada, and placing 9th in Tazawako dual moguls in Japan. These results qualified him for his World Championship debut at Sierra Nevada 2017. He placed 15th in the singles mogul event. However, due to an unfortunate crash in the training at the 2017 World Championships, Chapman-Davies had to undergo shoulder reconstruction surgery in March that year.

During the off-season, he went through an intense rehabilitation program which helped him return to the World Cup circuit. He made before the pre-Olympic qualifications which were at the end of 2017, where he then qualified due to his performance at the Thaiwoo World Cup in December 2017, placing 13th.

Personal

Chapman-Davies is married to Australian journalist, Lauren Tommasi.
