= Freestyle skiing at the 2015 Winter Universiade – Women's moguls =

The women's moguls competition of the 2015 Winter Universiade was held at Visera slope, Sierra Nevada, Spain on February 5, 2015.

The qualification round were cancelled due to bad weather conditions.

== Results ==
Rank	Bib	Name	Country	Score	Notes
1st place, gold medalist(s)	1	Yuliya Galysheva	Kazakhstan	66.00	
2nd place, silver medalist(s)	2	Marika Pertakhiya	Russia	59.90	
3rd place, bronze medalist(s)	3	Seo Jee-won	South Korea	51.86	
4	4	Seo Jung-hwa	South Korea	47.58	
5	13	Shelby Dyer	United States	47.18	
6	10	Svetlana Ivanova	Russia	43.92	
7	8	Svenja Redeker	Germany	31.94	
8	5	Ning Qin	China	14.10	
9	7	Katharina Ramsauer	Austria	13.49	
10	6	Maria Krasilova	Russia	11.20	
11	14	Patricia Muñoz	Spain	6.35	
12	9	Gao Dongxue	China	6.20	
13	15	Mandy Silverstone	United States	2.71	
14	11	Zhang Yingfan	China	0.30	
