= Yang Longxiao =

Chinese freestyle skier (born 2002)

Personal information
- Born: 8 June 2002 (age 24)

Sport
- Country: China
- Sport: Freestyle skiing
- Event: Aerials
Medal record
Men's freestyle skiing
Representing China
World Championships
Silver medal – second place	2023 Bakuriani	Mixed team aerials
Bronze medal – third place	2023 Bakuriani	Aerials
Asian Games
Silver medal – second place	2025 Harbin	Aerials

Yang Longxiao (born 8 June 2002) is a Chinese freestyle skier specializing in aerials.

== Career ==
Yang represented China at the 2023 FIS Freestyle Ski World Championships and won a silver medal in the mixed team aerials event. He also won a bronze medal in the aerials event with a score of 110.18.

He competed at the 2025 Asian Winter Games and won a silver medal in the aerials event with a score of 122.13.
