= Sabrina Cass =

Brazilian freestyle skier

Personal information
- Nationality: Brazil
- Born: 27 March 2002 (age 24) Cheshire, Connecticut, U.S.

Sport
- Sport: Freestyle skiing
- Event: Moguls
- Club: Wasatch Freestyle
Medal record
Women's freestyle skiing
Representing United States
Junior World Championships
Gold medal – first place	2019 Chiesa in Valmalenco	Moguls

Sabrina Cass (born 27 March 2002) is an American-born Brazilian freestyle skier. She competed in the 2022 Winter Olympics, becoming the first Brazilian in history to participate in the Winter Olympic Games on the Mogul skiing competition.

== Career ==
Cass won a gold medal at the 2019 Junior World Championships in the moguls event. She finished 21st out of 30 competitors in the first qualifying round and then 16th out of 20 competitors in the second qualifying round in the women's moguls event at the 2022 Winter Olympics, failing to qualify for the finals.

== Personal life ==
Cass was born and raised in the United States but was eligible to represent Brazil due to having a Brazilian mother. She represented the United States until switching allegiances to Brazil in 2021. She alternated living between Cheshire, Connecticut and Park City, Utah in order to train. She also played field hockey in high school.
