= Cooper Woods =

Australian freestyle skier (born 2000)

Personal information
- Full name: Cooper Woods-Topalovic
- Born: 7 September 2000 (age 25) Merimbula, New South Wales, Australia

Sport
- Country: Australia
- Sport: Freestyle skiing
- Event: Moguls
- Club: NSWIS

World Cup career
- Seasons: 9 (2017–2018, 2020–2026)
- Indiv. podiums: 1
- Indiv. wins: 0
Medal record
Men's Freestyle skiing
Representing Australia
World Cup race podiums
Event	1st	2nd	3rd
Moguls	0	1	0
Dual Moguls	0	0	0
Total	0	1	0
International freestyle ski competitions
Event	1st	2nd	3rd
Olympic Games	1	0	0
World Championships	0	0	0
Total	1	0	0
Olympic Games
Gold medal – first place	2026 Milano Cortina	Moguls

Cooper Woods-Topalovic (born 7 September 2000) is an Australian freestyle skier who won the gold medal in the men's moguls at the 2026 Winter Olympics.

== Early life ==
Woods was born in the coastal town of Pambula Beach, New South Wales. His parents, Katrina Woods and Matt Topalovic, were both members of the national skiing team. He began skiing at the age of two and tried a variety of sports throughout his childhood such as golf, soccer, surfing and rugby league. He joined the Perisher Winter Sports Club at 12 years of age. Woods has been mentored by former Wallabies captain John Eales since 2022 and the pair have worked together on mental resetting processes.

== Career ==
Woods broke into the World Cup top-10 in moguls on 7 January 2022, finishing ninth in Tremblant, and bested that five days later, by finishing fifth in Deer Valley. He trains out of Perisher Valley, New South Wales.

In the 2022 Winter Olympics, he competed in the Men's Moguls, ultimately finishing in 6th place. At the 2026 Winter Olympics, Woods finished 15th in the initial qualifier, forcing him to race once more in the second qualification round, securing him the 11th position in the first final round. He would then get the highest round score in finals 1. In finals 2, he achieved a score of 83.71, the same as Mikael Kingsbury, with his higher score in turns ultimately allowing him to claim Australia's 7th Winter Olympics gold medal.

== Results ==
=== Olympic Winter Games ===
As of 17 February 2026

Year	Age	Moguls	Dual Moguls
(China) 2022 Beijing	21	6	N/A
(Italy) 2026 Milano Cortina	25	1	13

=== World Championships ===
As of 17 February 2026

Year	Age	Moguls	Dual Moguls
(Kazakhstan) 2021 Almaty	20	15	DNF
(Georgia (country)) 2023 Bakuriani	22	11	9
(Switzerland) 2025 Engadin	24	9	8

=== World Cup results by season ===
As of 20 February 2026

Season	Wins	Podiums	Overall Moguls		Overall Freestyle Skiing		Moguls		Dual Moguls	
Season	Wins	Podiums	Points	Rank	Points	Rank	Points	Rank	Points	Rank
2017	0	0	7.00	57	0.64	283	N/A			
2018	0	0	2.00	59	0.20	299	N/A			
2020	0	0	46.00	33	4.60	175	N/A			
2021	0	0	70.00	17	N/A					
2022	0	0	122.00	20	N/A		122.00	17	–	–
2023	0	0	136.00	20	N/A		98.00	15	38.00	30
2024	0	1	404.00	10	N/A		221.00	7	183.00	11
2025	0	0	304.00	13	N/A		155.00	16	149.00	12

=== World Cup podiums ===
- 1 podium (1 silver)

As of 20 February 2026

No.	Season	Date	Location	Discipline	Result
1	2024	26 January 2024	Waterville, United States	Moguls	2nd
