= Taira Ski Area =

Ski resort in Japan

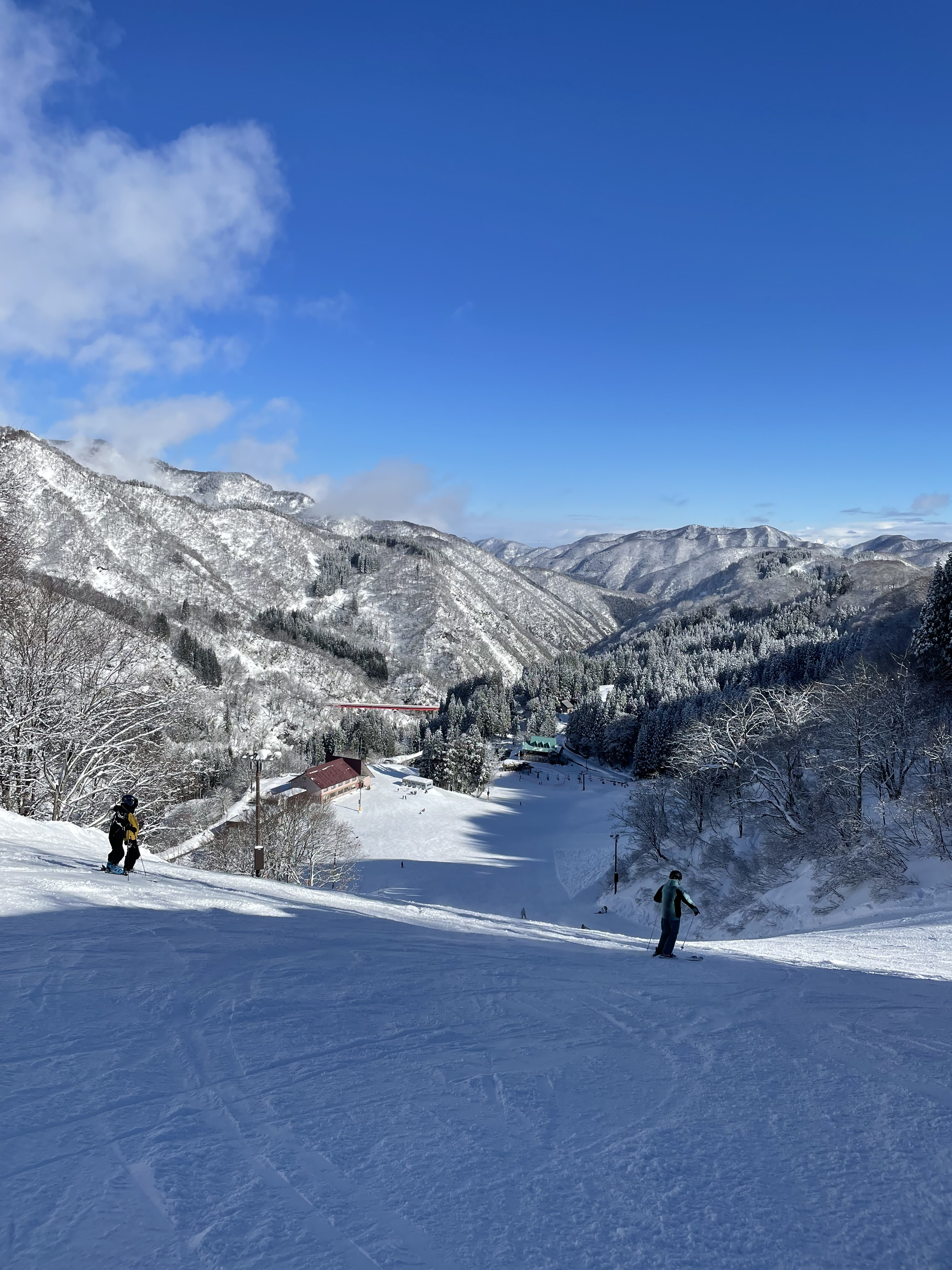
- Interactive map of Taira Ski Area
- Location: Nanto, Toyama, Japan
- Vertical: 303 m (994 ft)
- Top elevation: 933 m (3,061 ft)
- Base elevation: 630 m (2,067 ft)
- Trails: 36
- Longest run: 1,200 m (3,900 ft)
- Lift system: 3
- Website: Taira Ski Area

Taira Ski Area (たいらスキー場, Taira Sukī-jō) is a skiing venue located in Nanto, Toyama, Japan.

This ski resort was built in Nashitani village, which belongs to the Gokayama region. It is about a 10-minute drive from the Historic Villages of Ainokura.

The ski resort opened in 1985, and the second romance lift was completed on 19 December, 1987. Currently, five courses are set up on three pair lifts.

== See also ==
- List of ski areas and resorts in Japan
