= Pavel Dzik =

Belarusian freestyle skier (born 1998)

Personal information
- Full name: Pavel Andreyevich Dzik
- Nationality: Belarus
- Born: November 18, 1998 (age 27)

Sport
- Sport: Skiing

World Cup career
- Seasons: 6 (2016-2017, 2019-2022)
- Indiv. starts: 22
- Indiv. podiums: 2
- Team starts: 2
- Discipline titles: 0 – (11th in AE 2020)
Medal record
Men's freestyle skiing
Representing Belarus
Junior World Championships
Silver medal – second place	2017 Chiesa in Valmalenco	Aerials
- Updated on 26 May 2023

Pavel Dzik (born November 18, 1998) is a Belarusian freestyle skier, who competes in the aerials discipline. He competed the 2022 Winter Olympics, men's aerials event, but he didn't qualify to final.

== Career ==
As junior Dzik won silver medal at the 2017 Junior World Championships, behind fellow countryman Dmitry Mazurkevich. One year later he missed the podium, finished 5th place at the 2018 Junior World Championships. He competed at the 2021 World Championships, where he placed thirteenth in the men's aerials qualification, and didn't reach the final. He missed only 0.38 points to reach the final. At the mixed team event finished the fourth place with Hanna Huskova and Makar Mitrafanau.

== World Cup results ==
=== Race podiums ===
Season
Season	Date	Location	Discipline	Place
2020	15 February 2020	Moscow, Russia	Aerials	3rd
2020	28 February 2020	Almaty, Kazakhstan	Aerials	3rd

== World Championships results ==
Year	Age	Aerials	Aerials team
(Kazakhstan) 2021 Almaty	22	13	4

== Olympic results ==
Year	Age	Aerials	Aerials team
(China) 2022 Beijing	23	22	6
