= Diana Yablonska =

Ukrainian freestyle skier (born 2007)

Personal information
- Full name: Діана Вікторівна Яблонська
- Born: 15 August 2007 (age 18) Rivne, Ukraine

Sport
- Sport: Freestyle skiing
- Event: Aerials
Medal record
World Junior Championships
Gold medal – first place	2026 Airolo	Aerials Team
Bronze medal – third place	2026 Airolo	Aerials

Diana Viktorivna Yablonska (Ukrainian: Діана Вікторівна Яблонська; born 15 August 2007) is a Ukrainian freestyle skier specializing in aerials. She represented Ukraine at the 2026 Winter Olympics.

== Career ==
Yablonska debuted at the international level in January 2022 when she competed at the European Cup in Minsk. Later that year, she finished 9th at the Junior World Championships. On 3 December 2023, she debuted in the World Cup competitions, finishing 20th in Ruka, Finland.

In January 2026, she won a quota to represent Ukraine at the 2026 Winter Olympics. After the Olympics, she won bronze at World Junior Championships.

== Results ==
=== Olympic Winter Games ===
Year	Age	Aerials
(Italy) 2026 Milano Cortina	19	18

=== World Cup ===
==== Individual rankings ====
Season	Aerials
2023–24	30
2024–25	17
2025–26	21

=== European Cup ===
==== Podiums ====
Season	Place	Rank
2025–26	Airolo, Switzerland	2
