= Seo Myung-joon =

South Korean freestyle skier

Personal information
- Nationality: South Korean
- Born: 15 June 1992 (age 33)
- Height: 1.79 m (5 ft 10 in)

Sport
- Sport: Freestyle skiing

Korean name
- Hangul: 서명준
- RR: Seo Myeongjun
- MR: Sŏ Myŏngjun

Seo Myung-joon (born 15 June 1992) is a South Korean freestyle skier. He competed in the 2018 Winter Olympics.
