= Maksym Kuznietsov =

Ukrainian freestyle skier (born 2004)

Personal information
- Full name: Максим Юрійович Кузнєцов
- Born: 2 February 2004 (age 22) Rivne, Ukraine

Sport
- Sport: Skiing
Medal record
Men's freestyle skiing
Representing Ukraine
World Junior Championships
Bronze medal – third place	2024 Chiesa in Valmalenco	Mixed team aerials
- Updated on 18 March 2026

Maksym Yuriiovych Kuznietsov (Ukrainian: Максим Юрійович Кузнєцов; born 2 February 2004) is a Ukrainian freestyle skier, specializing in aerials. He competed at the 2026 Winter Olympics.

== Career ==
Kuznietsov made his World Cup debut on December 2, 2021, in Ruka, Finland. He did not finish in the competition, but on the next day, he finished 9th. As of March 2026, his best World Cup finish was 5th on March 19, 2023, in Almaty, Kazakhstan. He has won European Cup in seasons 2020–21 and 2023–24.

Kuznietsov competed at four Junior World Championships between 2019 and 2024. In 2024, he won bronze in the team event together with Anhelina Brykina (his future fellow Olympian in 2026) and Zakhar Maksymchuk.

His World Championships debut was at the 2023 Championships in Bakuriani, Georgia. He was finished 16th.

In 2026, Maksym Kuznietsov was nominated for his first Winter Games in Cortina d'Ampezzo. He finished 23rd in men's competition.

== Personal life ==
Kuznietsov is student of the Rivne State University of the Humanities.

== Career results ==
=== Winter Olympics ===
Year	Place	Aerials	Team event
2026	(Italy) Milano Cortina	23	—

=== World Championships ===
Year	Place	Aerials	Team event
2023	(Georgia (country)) Bakuriani, Georgia	16	—
2025	Engadin, Switzerland	10	—

=== World Cup ===
==== Individual rankings ====
Season	Aerials
2021–22	23
2022–23	8
2023–24	26
2024–25	14
2025–26	21

=== European Cup ===
==== Podiums ====
Season	Place	Event	Rank
2020–21	Krasiya, Ukraine	Individual	1
2020–21	Krasiya, Ukraine	Individual	1
2020–21	Airolo, Switzerland	Individual	3
2021–22	Minsk-Raubichi, Belarus	Individual	2
2021–22	Minsk-Raubichi, Belarus	Team	3
2022–23	Ruka, Finland	Individual	3
2023–24	Airolo, Switzerland	Individual	2
2023–24	Chiesa in Valmalenco, Italy	Individual	3
2024–25	Ruka, Finland	Individual	2
2024–25	Airolo, Switzerland	Individual	1
2024–25	Airolo, Switzerland	Individual	2
