= Freestyle skiing at the 2025 Asian Winter Games – Mixed team aerials =

Mixed team aerials at the 2025 Asian Winter Games
- Venue: Yabuli Ski Resort
- Dates: 10 February 2025
- Competitors: 9 from 3 nations

Medalists
gold medal	China; Xu Mengtao, Li Xinpeng, Qi Guangpu
silver medal	Kazakhstan; Ayana Zholdas, Sherzod Khashirbayev, Assylkhan Assan
bronze medal	Japan; Runa Igarashi, Yuta Nakagawa, Haruto Igarashi

The mixed team aerials at the 2025 Asian Winter Games was held on 10 February 2025 at Yabuli Ski Resort in Harbin, China.

== Schedule ==
All times are China Standard Time (UTC+08:00)

Date	Time	Event
Monday, 10 February 2025	11:00	Final

== Results ==
Rank	Team	Score
1st place, gold medalist(s)	China (CHN)	305.64
	Xu Mengtao	82.84
	Li Xinpeng	112.39
	Qi Guangpu	110.41
2nd place, silver medalist(s)	Kazakhstan (KAZ)	235.39
	Ayana Zholdas	53.55
	Sherzod Khashirbayev	97.99
	Assylkhan Assan	83.85
3rd place, bronze medalist(s)	Japan (JPN)	191.28
	Runa Igarashi	55.12
	Yuta Nakagawa	45.92
	Haruto Igarashi	90.24
