= Victor Primeau =

Canadian freestyle skier (born 2003)

Personal information
- Born: October 13, 2003 (age 22) Quebec City, Canada
- Home town: Lac-Beauport, Canada

Sport
- Country: Canada
- Sport: Freestyle skiing
- Event: Aerials
Medal record
Men's freestyle skiing
Representing Canada
Junior World Championships
Gold medal – first place	2022 Chiesa in Valmalenco	Aerials
Bronze medal – third place	2022 Chiesa in Valmalenco	Mixed team aerials
Bronze medal – third place	2023 Obertauern	Mixed team aerials

Victor Primeau (born October 13, 2003) is a Canadian freestyle skier specializing in aerials. He represented Canada at the 2026 Winter Olympics.

== Career ==
Primeau made his FIS Freestyle Junior World Ski Championships debut in 2022 and won a gold medal in the aerials event, and a bronze medal in the mixed team aerials event. He competed at the 2023 Junior World Championships and won a bronze medal in the mixed team aerials.

In January 2026, he was selected to represent Canada at the 2026 Winter Olympics.
