= Nicolas Gygax =

Swiss freestyle skier

Personal information
- Nationality: Swiss
- Born: 15 February 1996 (age 30)
- Height: 1.88 m (6 ft 2 in)
- Weight: 77 kg (170 lb)

Sport
- Country: Switzerland
- Sport: Freestyle skiing
- Event: Aerials
Medal record
Men's freestyle skiing
Representing Switzerland
World Championships
Gold medal – first place	2019 Utah	Mixed team aerials

Nicolas Gygax (born 15 February 1996) is a Swiss freestyle skier. He competed in the 2018 Winter Olympics.
