= Sofiane Gagnon =

Canadian freestyle skier

Personal information
- Born: April 12, 1999 (age 27) Whistler, British Columbia, Canada

Sport
- Country: Canada
- Sport: Freestyle skiing
- Event: Moguls

Sofiane Gagnon (born April 12, 1999) is a Canadian freestyle skier who competes internationally.

She competed in the FIS Freestyle Ski and Snowboarding World Championships 2019, where she placed tenth in women's moguls and sixteenth in women's dual moguls, and in FIS Freestyle Ski and Snowboarding World Championships 2021, where she placed nineteenth in women's moguls, and fourth in women's dual moguls.

On January 24, 2022, Gagnon was named to Canada's 2022 Olympic team.
