= Anastasiia Pervushina =

Russian freestyle skier

Personal information
- Born: 22 July 1997 (age 28) Chusovoy, Russia

Sport
- Country: Russia
- Sport: Freestyle skiing
- Event: Moguls
Medal record
Women's freestyle skiing
Representing Russia
Winter Universiade
Silver medal – second place	2017 Almaty	Moguls

Anastasiia Evgenievna Pervushina (Russian: Анастасия Евгеньевна Первушина; born 22 July 1997) is a Russian freestyle skier who competes internationally.

She competed in the FIS Freestyle Ski and Snowboarding World Championships 2021, where she placed eighteenth in women's moguls, and 21st in women's dual moguls.
