= Sam Macuga =

American skier (born 2001)

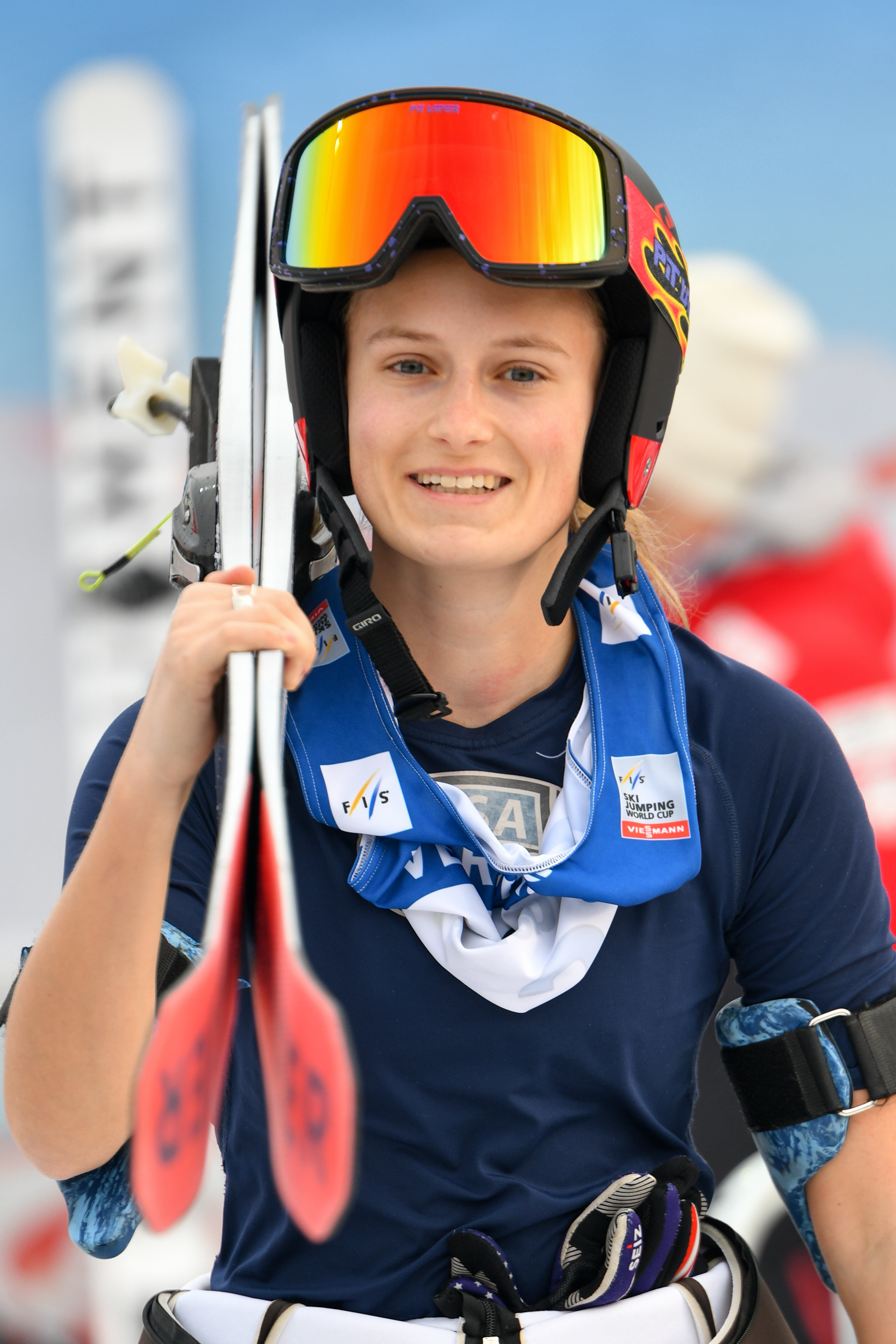
- Macuga in 2023

Personal information
- Born: February 17, 2001 (age 25) California, U.S.

Sport
- Country: United States
- Sport: Skiing

Samantha Macuga (born February 17, 2001) is an American ski jumper.

== Early life and education ==
Macuga was born on February 17, 2001 in California. She is the daughter of Dan Macuga, a marketing executive, and Amy Macuga, and grew up in Park City, Utah. She is a sister of skiers Lauren Macuga, Alli Macuga, and Daniel Macuga. She graduated from The Winter Sports School in Park City.

She attends Dartmouth College, where she is studying mechanical engineering and is a member of Kappa Delta sorority.

== Career ==
Macuga competes in ski jump. She competed at the World Championships in 2021 and 2023, placing 10th and 12th in team normal hill, respectively. She had six top 10 finishes at the 2022–23 FIS Ski Jumping Continental Cup and two top 15 finishes at the 2022 FIS Cup. In 2025, she placed 50th during the FIS Nordic World Ski Championships 2025 – Women's individual large hill.
