= Flavie Aumond =

Canadian freestyle skier

Personal information
- Born: 4 December 2002 (age 23) Montreal, Quebec, Canada

Sport
- Country: Canada
- Sport: Freestyle skiing
- Event: Aerials

Flavie Aumond (born 4 December 2002) is a Canadian freestyle skier who competes internationally in the aerials discipline.

== Career ==
Aumond joined the national team in 2020. Aumond had a fifth-place finish at the Deer Valley stop of the World Cup, the last stop before the 2022 Winter Olympics.

On January 24, 2022, Aumond was named to Canada's 2022 Olympic team.
