= Qi Guangpu =

Chinese freestyle skier (born 1990)

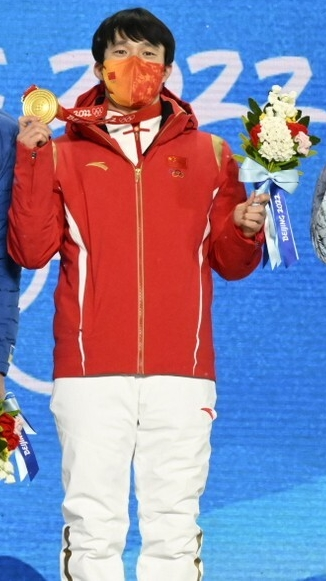

Personal information
- Born: October 20, 1990 (age 36) Xuzhou

Sport
- Sport: Skiing
Medal record
Men's freestyle skiing
Representing China
Olympic Games
Gold medal – first place	2022 Beijing	Aerials
Silver medal – second place	2022 Beijing	Mixed team aerials
World Championships
Gold medal – first place	2013 Voss	Aerials
Gold medal – first place	2015 Kreischberg	Aerials
Silver medal – second place	2011 Deer Valley	Aerials
Silver medal – second place	2017 Sierra Nevada	Aerials
Asian Games
Gold medal – first place	2025 Harbin	Mixed team aerials
Bronze medal – third place	2025 Harbin	Aerials
Bronze medal – third place	2025 Harbin	Synchro aerials

Qi Guangpu
- Simplified Chinese: 齐广璞
- Traditional Chinese: 齊廣璞
Transcriptions
Standard Mandarin
- Hanyu Pinyin: Qí Guǎngpú
- IPA: [tɕʰǐ kwàŋ pʰù]

Qi Guangpu (Chinese: 齐广璞; pinyin: Qí Guǎngpú; Mandarin pronunciation: [tɕʰǐ kwàŋ pʰù]; born October 20, 1990, in Xuzhou) is a Chinese aerial skier. He is a double world champion and won gold in aerials at the 2022 Winter Olympics.

== Career ==
Qi Guangpu competed at the 2010, 2014, 2018, and 2022 Winter Olympic Games. Although his performance in his first 3 Olympics was unsuccessful, and failing to win a medal (with a 4th place in 2014), his records at the FIS Freestyle World Ski Championships is much better, with a haul of 2 golds and 2 silvers from 2011 to 2017. He won a silver medal at the 2011 World in Deer Valley, US, and upgraded that to gold in 2013 in Voss, Norway. He successfully defended his world title at the 2015 World in Kreischberg, Austria. He followed that in 2017 with a silver.

He did very well at the 2022 Winter Olympics, where he won gold in the Aerials after he landed a quintuple-twisting triple backflip in the final round and earned 129 points, easily beating defending champion Oleksandr Abramenko, who had come second after scoring 116.5. He had also participated in the Mixed Aerials, where his team won silver.
