= Walter Wallberg =

Swedish freestyle skier (born 2000)

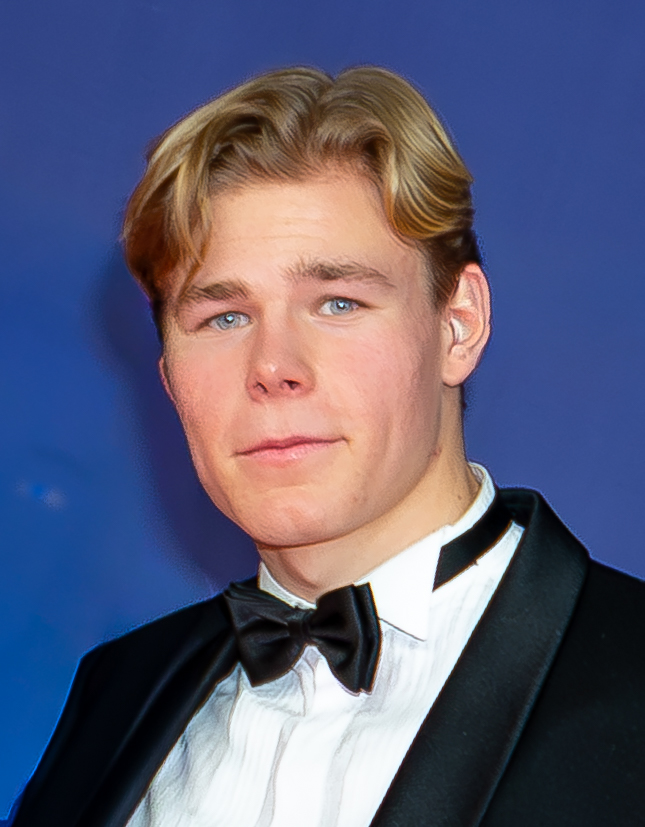
- Wallberg in 2023

Personal information
- Nationality: Swedish
- Born: 24 March 2000 (age 26) Bollnäs, Sweden
- Height: 1.84 m (6 ft 0 in)

Sport
- Sport: Freestyle skiing
Medal record
Men's freestyle skiing
Representing Sweden
Olympic Games
Gold medal – first place	2022 Beijing	Moguls
World Championships
Silver medal – second place	2023 Bakuriani	Dual Moguls
Bronze medal – third place	2023 Bakuriani	Moguls

Walter Waldemar Wallberg (born 24 March 2000) is a Swedish freestyle skier. He competed in the 2018 Winter Olympics. He won gold in the Beijing 2022 Winter Olympics men's moguls with a score of 83.23. He was the flag bearer for Sweden during the opening ceremony of the 2026 Winter Olympics along with Sara Hector.
