= Jorinde Müller =

Swiss freestyle skier (born 1993)

Personal information
- Born: 2 October 1993 (age 32) Münster-Geschinen, Switzerland

Sport
- Sport: Skiing

Jorinde Müller (born 2 October 1993 in Münster-Geschinen) is a Swiss freestyle skier, specializing in ski cross and alpine skiing.

Müller competed at the 2014 Winter Olympics for Switzerland. She finished 7th in the seeding run for the ski cross event. In the first round, she did not finish, failing to advance.

As of September 2015, her best showing at the Freestyle World Championships is 4th, in the 2013 ski cross.

Müller made her Freestyle World Cup debut in December 2011. As of September 2015, her best World Cup finish is 7th, achieved on a pair of occasions. Her best Freestyle World Cup overall finish in ski cross is 14th, in 2013–14.
