= Emerson Smith (skier) =

American freestyle skier

Personal information
- Nationality: American
- Born: February 13, 1997 (age 29)
- Height: 1.85 m (6 ft 1 in)

Sport
- Sport: Freestyle skiing

Emerson Smith (born February 13, 1997) is an American freestyle skier. He competed in the 2018 Winter Olympics in the Men's Moguls.
