= Lauren Macuga =

American alpine skier (born 2002)

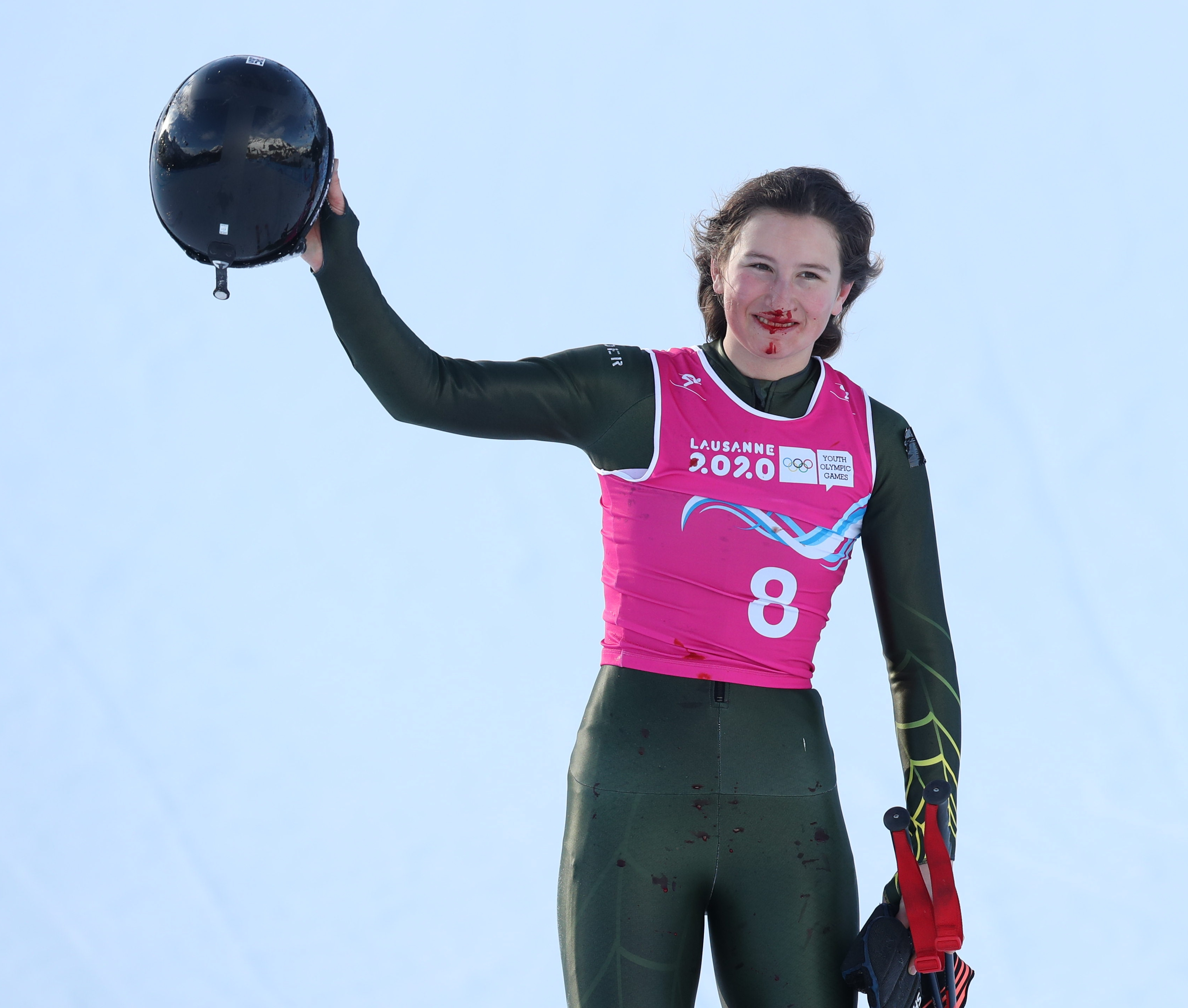
- At the 2020 Winter Youth Olympics

Personal information
- Born: July 4, 2002 (age 24) Detroit, Michigan, US
- Home town: Park City, Utah, US
- Family: Sam Macuga (sister); Alli Macuga (sister); Daniel Macuga (brother)

Skiing career
- Country: United States
- Sport: Alpine skiing ♀
- Club: Park City Ski & Snowboard
- Disciplines: Downhill, Super-G, Giant slalom
- World Cup debut: December 3, 2021 (age 19)

Olympics
- Teams: 0

World Championships
- Teams: 1 – (2025)
- Medals: 1 (0 gold)

World Cup
- Seasons: 4 – (2022–2025)
- Wins: 1 – (1 SG)
- Podiums: 2 – (1 SG, 1 DH)
- Overall titles: 0 – (17th in 2025)
- Discipline titles: 0 – (4th in DH, 2025)
Medal record
Women's alpine skiing
Representing the United States
World Championships
Bronze medal – third place	2025 Saalbach	Super-G
Junior World Championships
Bronze medal – third place	2022 Panorama	Downhill

Lauren Macuga (born July 4, 2002) is an American World Cup alpine ski racer on the US Ski Team who specializes in the speed events of downhill and super-G.

Macuga competed in the 2020 Winter Youth Olympics and made her World Cup debut in December 2021. She achieved her first World Cup victory in January 2025 and won the bronze medal in the super-G at the 2025 World Championships.

== Early life ==
Born in Detroit and raised in Park City, Utah, Macuga is the second-born of four children, all of whom are active in competitive skiing. Her older sister Sam is a World Cup ski jumper. Her younger sister, Alli is a mogul skier on the Freestyle World Cup. Their brother Daniel, the youngest of the siblings, is also an alpine skier and raced on the Nor-Am Cup for the 2025–26 season.

Macuga began competing in ski racing at seven years old.

== Career ==
In 2011, Macuga joined the Park City Ski and Snowboard's club team at the age of 8. In the same year, she was invited to participate in NASTAR nationals and championed her age group. Macuga attended Park City Winter Sports School and participates in the Park City Ski & Snowboard Club. Macuga joined the Park City Ski & Snowboard FIS women's team for the first time in 2019, trained by Jay Hey. Because she had no previous racing experience, Macuga had to work her way up from 990th place by participating and placing in various FIS events. Macuga placed third in the last race of the FIS season, giving her enough points to qualify to be a US Team nominee at 445th place. Her place on the team was confirmed a month later by US Ski and Snowboard Alpine development director Chip Knight, and she was one of two women from Utah on the team at that time. Alongside Zoe Zimmerman, Macuga was one of the first two mentees of Alice Merryweather.

On March 19, 2019, Macuga made her debut in the Nor-Am Cup in the downhill at the Sugarloaf ski resort. She continued racing on the Nor-Am circuit for the 2019–20 season, and was named to the US team for the 2020 Winter Youth Olympics in Lausanne, Switzerland. She broke her leg there in a crash during the super-G portion of the alpine combined and did not race again that season.

Her World Cup debut came on December 3, 2021 in Lake Louise, Canada, followed by winning the bronze medal in the downhill at the 2022 Junior World Championships.

The 2022–23 season saw several more starts on the Nor-Am Cup, Europa Cup, and World Cup, including her first World Cup point in the downhill at St. Moritz and another appearance at the Junior World Championships.

Macuga had particular success in the super-G during the 2024 World Cup season, including three top-ten finishes and qualifying for her first World Cup finals.

Her first World Cup victory came during the 2025 season when she became the first American woman to win the super-G at St. Anton, Austria. In February she competed in her first senior World Championships in Saalbach-Hinterglemm, Austria, and won the bronze in the super-G. This was followed a few weeks later by a second World Cup podium with a second-place finish in the downhill at Kvitfjell, Norway. Due to her breakout season in 2025, Macuga was given 2025 Stifel's Most Improved (Women) and Athlete of the Year (Women) awards at the US Alpine Championships in April.

In November 2025, during pre-season training at Copper Mountain, Macuga injured the ACL of her right knee and missed the World Cup season and 2026 Winter Olympics.

== World Cup results ==
=== Season standings ===
Season
Season	Age	Overall	Slalom	Giant slalom	Super-G	Downhill
2023	20	122	—	—	—	49
2024	21	43	—	—	13	33
2025	22	17	—	43	6	4
2026	23	knee injury in November, out for season				

=== Race podiums ===
- 1 win – (1 SG)
- 2 podiums – (1 SG, 1 DH), 10 top tens

Season
Season	Date	Location	Discipline	Place
2025	January 12, 2025	St. Anton, Austria	Super-G	1st
2025	March 1, 2025	Kvitfjell, Norway	Downhill	2nd

== World Championship results ==
Year
Year	Age	Slalom	Giant slalom	Super-G	Downhill	Team combined	Team event
2025	22	—	—	3	5	4	—
