= Quinn Dehlinger =

American freestyle skier (born 2002)

Personal information
- Born: June 8, 2002 (age 24) Cincinnati, Ohio, U.S.

Sport
- Country: United States
- Sport: Freestyle skiing
- Event: Aerials
Medal record
Men's freestyle skiing
Representing the United States
World Championships
Gold medal – first place	2023 Bakuriani	Mixed team aerials
Gold medal – first place	2025 Engadin	Mixed team aerials
Silver medal – second place	2023 Bakuriani	Aerials
Silver medal – second place	2025 Engadin	Aerials

Quinn Dehlinger (born June 8, 2002) is an American freestyle skier specializing in aerials.

== Career ==
Dehlinger represented the United States at the 2023 FIS Freestyle Ski World Championships and won a gold medal in the mixed team aerials event and a silver medal in the aerials event with a score of 114.48. He again competed at the 2025 FIS Freestyle Ski World Championships and won a gold medal in the mixed team aerials event with 344.63 points. The United States became the first country to win consecutive FIS Freestyle World Ski Championships gold medals in the team aerials event.

In January 2026, he was selected to represent the United States at the 2026 Winter Olympics. He withdrew from the aerials competition due to re-aggravating a knee injury.
