= Carol Bouvard =

Swiss freestyle skier (born 1998)

Personal information
- Nationality: Swiss
- Born: 12 January 1998 (age 28)
- Height: 1.63 m (5 ft 4 in)
- Weight: 59 kg (130 lb)

Sport
- Country: Switzerland
- Sport: Freestyle skiing
- Event: Aerials
- Club: Freestyle Company Jumpin
Medal record
Women's freestyle skiing
Representing Switzerland
World Championships
Gold medal – first place	2019 Utah	Mixed team aerials
Silver medal – second place	2021 Almaty	Mixed team aerials

Carol Bouvard (born 12 January 1998) is a Swiss freestyle skier.

She participated at the FIS Freestyle Ski and Snowboarding World Championships 2019, winning the gold medal in the Aerials team competition.
