= Veronika Redder =

German freestyle skier (born 2004)

Personal information
- Born: 14 October 2004 (age 21) Greenville, South Carolina, U.S.

Sport
- Country: Germany
- Sport: Freestyle skiing
- Event: Ski cross
Medal record
Women's freestyle skiing
Representing Germany
Junior World Championships
Gold medal – first place	2024 Idre Fjäll	Team ski cross
Gold medal – first place	2025 Isola 2000	Ski cross
Gold medal – first place	2025 Isola 2000	Team ski cross
Silver medal – second place	2023 Veronika Redder	Ski cross
Silver medal – second place	2024 Idre Fjäll	Ski cross

Veronika Redder (born 14 October 2004) is a German freestyle skier specializing in ski cross. She represented Germany at the 2026 Winter Olympics.

== Career ==
Redder competed at the 2024 FIS Freestyle Junior World Ski Championships and won a gold medal in the team ski and a silver medal in the ski cross events. She again competed at the Junior World Ski Championships in 2025 and won gold medals in the ski cross and team ski cross events.

In January 2026, she was selected to represent Germany at the 2026 Winter Olympics.
