= Casey Andringa =

American freestyle skier (born 1995)

Personal information
- Full name: Casey William Andringa
- Born: October 6, 1995 (age 30) Milwaukee, Wisconsin, U.S.
- Height: 5 ft 11 in (1.80 m)
- Weight: 180 lb (82 kg)

Sport
- Sport: Freestyle skiing

Casey William Andringa (born October 6, 1995) is an American freestyle skier. He competed in, and finished 5th at the 2018 Winter Olympics. In addition to his skiing, he is a well-known photographer and surfer.
