= Haruto Igarashi =

Japanese freestyle skier (born 2002)

Personal information
- Born: 13 December 2002 (age 23) Hokkaido, Japan

Sport
- Sport: Freestyle skiing
- Event: Aerials
Medal record
Men's freestyle skiing
Representing Japan
Asian Winter Games
Bronze medal – third place	2025 Harbin	Mixed team aerials

Haruto Igarashi (五十嵐晴冬, Igarashi Haruto; born 13 December 2002) is a Japanese freestyle skier specializing in aerials. He represented Japan at the 2026 Winter Olympics.

== Career ==
In February 2025, Igarashi competed at the 2025 Asian Winter Games and won a bronze medal in the mixed team aerials event. In January 2026, he was selected to represent Japan at the 2026 Winter Olympics.

== Personal life ==
Igarashi's younger sister, Runa, is also an Olympic freestyle skier.
