= Viktoriia Lazarenko =

Russian freestyle skier

Personal information
- Nationality: Russian
- Born: 25 March 2003 (age 23) Chusovoy, Russia

Sport
- Country: Russia
- Sport: Freestyle skiing
- Event: Moguls
Medal record
Women's freestyle skiing
Representing Russian Ski Federation
World Championships
Silver medal – second place	2021 Almaty	Dual moguls
Representing Russia
Junior World Championships
Gold medal – first place	2018 Duved	Dual moguls
Gold medal – first place	2021 Krasnoyarsk	Dual moguls
Silver medal – second place	2021 Krasnoyarsk	Moguls
Bronze medal – third place	2018 Duved	Moguls
Bronze medal – third place	2019 Chiesa in Valmalenco	Moguls

Viktoriia Sergeyevna Lazarenko (Russian: Виктория Сергеевна Лазаренко; born 25 March 2003) is a Russian freestyle skier.

She participated at the dual moguls at the FIS Freestyle Ski and Snowboarding World Championships 2021, winning a medal.
