= Miha Fontaine =

Canadian freestyle skier (born 2004)

Personal information
- Nationality: Canada
- Born: January 3, 2004 (age 22) Magog, Quebec, Canada

Sport
- Sport: Skiing

World Cup career
- Seasons: 4 (2020-2023)
- Indiv. starts: 18
- Team starts: 2
- Discipline titles: 0 – (10th in AE 2023)
Medal record
Men's freestyle skiing
Representing Canada
Olympic Games
Bronze medal – third place	2022 Beijing	Mixed team aerials
- Updated on 25 May 2023

Miha Fontaine (born January 3, 2004) is a Canadian freestyle skier who competes internationally in the aerials discipline. He is the son of former Aerials world champion Nicolas Fontaine.

== Career ==
Fontaine joined the national team in 2019. In early 2022, along with fellow aerialist Émile Nadeau, Fontaine started to introduce more complex tricks into his routines to improve and consistency in his placements. This led to a sixth-place finish at the Deer Valley stop of the World Cup.

=== Winter Olympics medalist ===
On January 24, 2022 Fontaine was named to Canada's 2022 Olympic team. At the games, Fontaine was a part of Canada's bronze medal winning mixed aerials team.

== World Championships results ==
Year	Age	Aerials	Aerials team
(Kazakhstan) 2021 Almaty	17	22	6
(Georgia (country)) 2023 Bakuriani	19	17	5

== Olympic results ==
Year	Age	Aerials	Aerials team
(China) 2022 Beijing	18	13	3
(Italy) 2026 Milano Cortina	22	15	5
