= Alli Macuga =

American freestyle skier (born 2003)

Personal information
- Born: September 24, 2003 (age 22)

Sport
- Country: United States
- Sport: Skiing

Alli Macuga (born September 24, 2003) is an American freestyle skier.

== Early life and education ==
Macagua was born on September 24, 2003 to Dan Macuga, a marketing executive, and Amy Macuga. She is a sister of skiers Lauren Macuga, Sam Macuga, and Daniel Macuga. She grew up in Park City, Utah.

Macuga is a student at the University of Utah.

== Career ==
She competes in mogul skiing. Macuga made her World Cup debut in Ruka, Finland in December 2022, placing 12th in the top 20. She placed in the top 10 four times in the 2022-2023 season and placed fourth at the Almaty World Cup. She won the 2022-2023 NorAm Cup moguls and dual moguls overall and was awarded the FIS Rookie of the Year in 2023. In the 2023-2024 season, she finished second in the Almaty moguls and third in the Alpe d'Huez duals. She was ranked fifth in the world at the end of the 2023 season.

In January 2025, she became a sponsored athlete at Deer Valley Resort.
