= Émile Nadeau =

Canadian freestyle skier

Personal information
- Born: 13 January 2004 (age 22) Prévost, Quebec, Canada

Sport
- Country: Canada
- Sport: Freestyle skiing
- Event: Aerials

Émile Nadeau (born 13 January 2004) is a Canadian freestyle skier who competes internationally in the aerials discipline.

== Career ==
Nadeau joined the national team in 2020. In early 2022, along with fellow aerialist Miha Fontaine, Nadeau started to introduce more complex tricks into his routines to improve and consistency in his placements. This led to a fifth-place finish at the Deer Valley stop of the World Cup, his second career top five (the first being a fourth-place finish a year earlier).

On January 24, 2022, Nadeau was named to Canada's 2022 Olympic team. Nadeau was the youngest male Canadian athlete on the team.
