= Korobitsyno =

Rural locality in Vyborgsky District, Russia

Coordinates: 60°31′N 29°43′E

Korobitsyno (Russian: Коробицыно) is a rural locality on Karelian Isthmus, in Vyborgsky District of Leningrad Oblast, hosting three ski resorts: Zolotaya Dolina, Snezhny, and Krasnoye Ozero.
