= So Matsuda =

Japanese freestyle skier (born 1999)

Personal information
- Nationality: Japanese
- Born: 24 September 1999 (age 25); Kyoto, Japan

Sport
- Sport: Freestyle skiing
- Event: Moguls
- Club: Snow Amusement

So Matsuda (Japanese: 松田颯, born 24 September 1999) is a Japanese freestyle skier. He competed in the 2022 Winter Olympics. He currently resides in Nagano.

In 23 World Cup starts, he has two top-10 finishes, his best being sixth in dual moguls (2019 in Thaiwoo) and seventh in moguls (2022 in Deer Valley). He was the 2019 Japanese national moguls champion.
