= Kai Owens =

American freestyle skier

Personal information
- Born: August 16, 2004 (age 21) Lu'an, China

Sport
- Country: United States
- Sport: Freestyle skiing
- Event: Moguls
- Club: Ski and Snowboard Club Vail

Kai Owens (born August 16, 2004) was an American freestyle skier who competed internationally.

== Career ==
She competed in the FIS Freestyle Ski and Snowboarding World Championships 2021, where she placed sixth in women's ski moguls.

In 2021 Kai was named FIS Rookie of the year.

She competed at the 2022 Winter Olympics.

In February of 2026 Kai announced her retirement from mogul skiing.
