= Emil Holmgren =

Swedish histologist

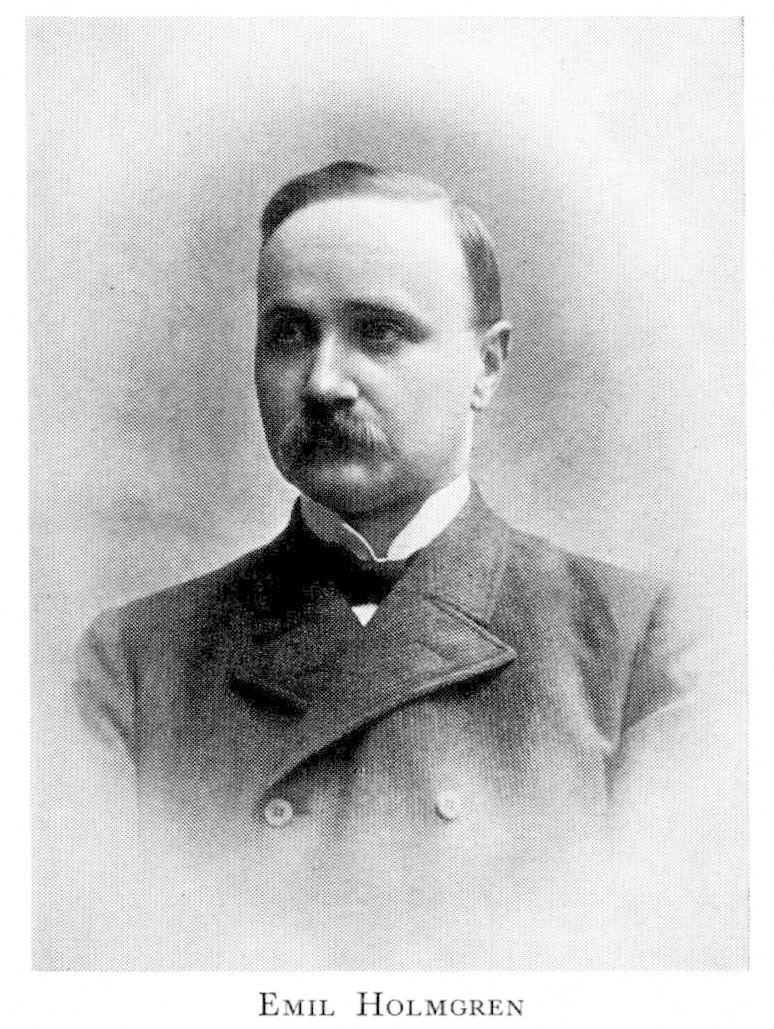

Emil Algot Holmgren (14 May 1866 – 22 October 1922) was a Swedish professor of histology at the Karolinska Institute. He was the son of the zoologist August Emil Algot Holmgren (1829–1888).

Holmgren was born in Stockholm, the son of zoologist August Holmgren. At gymnasium he associated with Leonard Jägerskiöld and Axel von Klinckowström and went on outings with his father. He went to the Stockholm University College and then to the University of Uppsala in 1886 to study medicine. He had an interest in entomology and began to work at the National Museum as an assistant. He went on an entomology expedition to Jämtland. After the death of his father he earned money by writing in newspapers. He was offered a trip to Cameroon but instead took up an amanuensis position at the Karolinska Institute under Gustaf Retzius. With a scholarship he worked on his doctorate and wrote a dissertation in 1899 on the spinal ganglia of monkfish (Lophius piscatorius). The faculty opponent, Erik Müller rejected it but the college accepted it. He subsequently worked on several other dissertations on the development and evolution of multi-cellular organisms. From 1909 he was a regular professor and a full professor from 1910 (taking the place of Müller). Holmgren published the first Swedish text book on histology Lärobok i histologi (1920). Holmgren supported the nomination of Ramon y Cajal for the Nobel prize in 1906. Holmgren had also supported Golgi in 1902 and the Nobel prize committee had assigned Holmgren the task of examining the work of Golgi and Cajal and to write reports on their work until 1906 when they both finally shared the Nobel.

Holmgren was also an artist and musician. He died from diabetes just before insulin came into use in treatment in Sweden.
