= Chronological summary of the 2026 Winter Olympics =

This is a chronological summary of the major events of the 2026 Winter Olympics in Milan, Cortina d'Ampezzo, and other areas in Lombardy and Northeast Italy. Competition began on 4 February with the first matches in the round robin stages of the curling event. The opening ceremony was held two days later on 6 February. The last day of competition and the closing ceremony were held on 22 February. The games featured 116 medal events in 16 disciplines.

== Calendar ==
Competition began two days before the opening ceremony on 4 February, and ended on 22 February 2026.

OC	Opening ceremony	●	Event competitions	X	Event finals	EG	Exhibition gala	CC	Closing ceremony

February 2026	4th Wed	5th Thu	6th Fri	7th Sat	8th Sun	9th Mon	10th Tue	11th Wed	12th Thu	13th Fri	14th Sat	15th Sun	16th Mon	17th Tue	18th Wed	19th Thu	20th Fri	21st Sat	22nd Sun	Events
Ceremonies			OC																CC	—N/a
Alpine skiing				1	1	1	1	1	1		1	1	1		1					10
Biathlon					1		1	1		1	1	2		1	1		1	1		11
Bobsleigh												●	1	1			●	1	1	4
Cross-country skiing				1	1		2		1	1	1	1			2			1	1	12
Curling	●	●	●	●	●	●	1	●	●	●	●	●	●	●	●	●	●	1	1	3
Figure skating			●	●	1	●	●	1		1		●	1	●		1		EG		5
Freestyle skiing				●		1	1	1	1		1	1	1	1	1	●	3	2	1	15
Ice hockey		●	●	●	●	●	●	●	●	●	●	●	●	●	●	1	●	●	1	2
Luge				●	1	●	1	2	1											5
Nordic combined								1						1		1				3
Short-track speed skating							1		2		1		1		2		2			9
Skeleton									●	1	1	1								3
Ski jumping				1		1	1				1	1	1							6
Ski mountaineering																2		1		3
Snowboarding		●		1	2	1		●	2	2		1			2					11
Speed skating				1	1	1		1	1	1	1	1		2		1	1	2		14
Daily medal events	0	0	0	5	8	5	9	8	9	7	8	9	6	6	9	6	7	9	5	116
Cumulative total	0	0	0	5	13	18	27	35	44	51	59	68	74	80	89	95	102	111	116	116
February 2026	4th Wed	5th Thu	6th Fri	7th Sat	8th Sun	9th Mon	10th Tue	11th Wed	12th Thu	13th Fri	14th Sat	15th Sun	16th Mon	17th Tue	18th Wed	19th Thu	20th Fri	21st Sat	22nd Sun	Total events

== Medal table ==
* Host nation (Italy)

2026 Winter Olympics medal table (Note: Although the IOC does not include Individual Neutral Athletes in the official medal tables, they are listed here for comparison and historical purposes.)
Rank	NOC	Gold	Silver	Bronze	Total
1	Norway	18	12	11	41
2	United States	12	12	9	33
3	Netherlands	10	7	3	20
4	Italy*	10	6	14	30
5	Germany	8	10	8	26
6	France	8	9	6	23
7	Sweden	8	6	4	18
8	Switzerland	6	9	8	23
9	Austria	5	8	5	18
10	Japan	5	7	12	24
11	Canada	5	7	9	21
12	China	5	4	6	15
13	South Korea	3	4	3	10
14	Australia	3	2	1	6
15	Great Britain	3	1	1	5
16–29	Remaining	7	14	15	36
Totals (29 entries)		116	118	115	349

== Day-by-day summaries ==
=== 4 February ===
Curling

- The first matches in the round-robin stage of the mixed doubles tournament.

=== 5 February ===
Curling

- The second day in the round-robin stage of the mixed doubles tournament.

Ice hockey

- The first matches in the group stage of the women's tournament.

Snowboarding

- The qualification rounds in the men's big air.

=== 6 February ===
Curling

- The third day in the round-robin stage of the mixed doubles tournament.

Figure skating

- The first day of competition in the team event.

Ice hockey

- The second day in the group stage of the women's tournament.

Opening ceremony

- Opening ceremony at San Siro in Milan, as well as three other venues in the first ever multi venue event that also included Livigno, Predazzo and Cortina.

=== Day 1: 7 February ===
Sport	Event	Gold medalists			Silver medalists		Bronze medalists		Ref
Sport	Event	Competitors	Team	Rec	Competitors	Team	Competitors	Team	Ref
Alpine skiing	Men's downhill	Franjo von Allmen	Switzerland		Giovanni Franzoni	Italy	Dominik Paris	Italy	
Cross-country skiing	Women's skiathlon	Frida Karlsson	Sweden		Ebba Andersson	Sweden	Heidi Weng	Norway	
Ski jumping	Women's normal hill individual	Anna Odine Strøm	Norway		Nika Prevc	Slovenia	Nozomi Maruyama	Japan	
Snowboarding	Men's big air	Kira Kimura	Japan		Ryoma Kimata	Japan	Su Yiming	China	
Speed skating	Women's 3000m	Francesca Lollobrigida	Italy	OR	Ragne Wiklund	Norway	Valérie Maltais	Canada	

=== Day 2: 8 February ===
Sport	Event	Gold medalists			Silver medalists		Bronze medalists		Ref
Sport	Event	Competitors	Team	Rec	Competitors	Team	Competitors	Team	Ref
Alpine skiing	Women's downhill	Breezy Johnson	United States		Emma Aicher	Germany	Sofia Goggia	Italy	
Biathlon	Mixed relay	Éric Perrot; Quentin Fillon Maillet; Lou Jeanmonnot; Julia Simon	France		Tommaso Giacomel; Lukas Hofer; Dorothea Wierer; Lisa Vittozzi	Italy	Justus Strelow; Philipp Nawrath; Vanessa Voigt; Franziska Preuß	Germany	
Cross-country skiing	Men's skiathlon	Johannes Høsflot Klæbo	Norway		Mathis Desloges	France	Martin Løwstrøm Nyenget	Norway	
Figure skating	Team	Ilia Malinin; Alysa Liu; Amber Glenn; Ellie Kam; Daniel O'Shea; Madison Chock; Evan Bates	United States		Yuma Kagiyama; Shun Sato; Kaori Sakamoto; Riku Miura; Ryuichi Kihara; Utana Yoshida; Masaya Morita	Japan	Daniel Grassl; Matteo Rizzo; Lara Naki Gutmann; Sara Conti; Niccolò Macii; Charlène Guignard; Marco Fabbri	Italy	
Luge	Men's singles	Max Langenhan	Germany		Jonas Müller	Austria	Dominik Fischnaller	Italy	
Snowboarding	Men's parallel giant slalom	Benjamin Karl	Austria		Kim Sang-kyum	South Korea	Tervel Zamfirov	Bulgaria	
Snowboarding	Women's parallel giant slalom	Zuzana Maděrová	Czech Republic		Sabine Payer	Austria	Lucia Dalmasso	Italy	
Speed skating	Men's 5000m	Sander Eitrem	Norway	OR	Metoděj Jílek	Czech Republic	Riccardo Lorello	Italy	

=== Day 3: 9 February ===
Sport	Event	Gold medalists			Silver medalists		Bronze medalists		Ref
Sport	Event	Competitors	Team	Rec	Competitors	Team	Competitors	Team	Ref
Alpine skiing	Men's team combined	Franjo von Allmen; Tanguy Nef	Switzerland		Vincent Kriechmayr; Manuel Feller	Austria	Not awarded due to a tie for silver		
Alpine skiing	Men's team combined	Franjo von Allmen; Tanguy Nef	Switzerland		Marco Odermatt; Loïc Meillard	Switzerland	Not awarded due to a tie for silver		
Freestyle skiing	Women's slopestyle	Mathilde Gremaud	Switzerland		Eileen Gu	China	Megan Oldham	Canada	
Ski jumping	Men's normal hill individual	Philipp Raimund	Germany		Kacper Tomasiak	Poland	Ren Nikaidō	Japan	
Ski jumping	Men's normal hill individual	Philipp Raimund	Germany		Kacper Tomasiak	Poland	Gregor Deschwanden	Switzerland	
Snowboarding	Women's big air	Kokomo Murase	Japan		Zoi Sadowski-Synnott	New Zealand	Yu Seung-eun	South Korea	
Speed skating	Women's 1000m	Jutta Leerdam	Netherlands	OR	Femke Kok	Netherlands	Miho Takagi	Japan	

=== Day 4: 10 February ===
Sport	Event	Gold medalists			Silver medalists		Bronze medalists		Ref
Sport	Event	Competitors	Team	Rec	Competitors	Team	Competitors	Team	Ref
Alpine skiing	Women's team combined	Ariane Rädler; Katharina Huber	Austria		Kira Weidle-Winkelmann; Emma Aicher	Germany	Jacqueline Wiles; Paula Moltzan	United States	
Biathlon	Men's individual	Johan-Olav Botn	Norway		Éric Perrot	France	Sturla Holm Lægreid	Norway	
Cross-country skiing	Men's sprint	Johannes Høsflot Klæbo	Norway		Ben Ogden	United States	Oskar Opstad Vike	Norway	
Cross-country skiing	Women's sprint	Linn Svahn	Sweden		Jonna Sundling	Sweden	Maja Dahlqvist	Sweden	
Curling	Mixed doubles	Isabella Wranå; Rasmus Wranå	Sweden		Cory Thiesse; Korey Dropkin	United States	Stefania Constantini; Amos Mosaner	Italy	
Freestyle skiing	Men's slopestyle	Birk Ruud	Norway		Alex Hall	United States	Luca Harrington	New Zealand	
Luge	Women's singles	Julia Taubitz	Germany		Elīna Ieva Bota	Latvia	Ashley Farquharson	United States	
Short-track speed skating	Mixed relay	Elisa Confortola; Arianna Fontana; Thomas Nadalini; Pietro Sighel; Chiara Betti	Italy		Kim Boutin; William Dandjinou; Félix Roussel; Courtney Sarault; Steven Dubois	Canada	Hanne Desmet; Stijn Desmet; Tineke den Dulk; Ward Pétré	Belgium	
Ski jumping	Mixed team	Nika Vodan; Anže Lanišek; Nika Prevc; Domen Prevc	Slovenia		Anna Odine Strøm; Kristoffer Eriksen Sundal; Eirin Maria Kvandal; Marius Lindvik	Norway	Nozomi Maruyama; Ryōyū Kobayashi; Sara Takanashi; Ren Nikaidō	Japan	

=== Day 5: 11 February ===
Sport	Event	Gold medalists			Silver medalists		Bronze medalists		Ref
Sport	Event	Competitors	Team	Rec	Competitors	Team	Competitors	Team	Ref
Alpine skiing	Men's Super-G	Franjo von Allmen	Switzerland		Ryan Cochran-Siegle	United States	Marco Odermatt	Switzerland	
Biathlon	Women's individual	Julia Simon	France		Lou Jeanmonnot	France	Lora Hristova	Bulgaria	
Figure skating	Ice dance	Laurence Fournier Beaudry; Guillaume Cizeron	France		Madison Chock; Evan Bates	United States	Piper Gilles; Paul Poirier	Canada	
Freestyle skiing	Women's moguls	Elizabeth Lemley	United States		Jaelin Kauf	United States	Perrine Laffont	France	
Luge	Men's doubles	Emanuel Rieder; Simon Kainzwaldner	Italy		Thomas Steu; Wolfgang Kindl	Austria	Tobias Wendl; Tobias Arlt	Germany	
Luge	Women's doubles	Andrea Vötter; Marion Oberhofer	Italy		Dajana Eitberger; Magdalena Matschina	Germany	Selina Egle; Lara Kipp	Austria	
Nordic combined	Individual normal hill/10 km	Jens Lurås Oftebro	Norway		Johannes Lamparter	Austria	Eero Hirvonen	Finland	
Speed skating	Men's 1000m	Jordan Stolz	United States	OR	Jenning de Boo	Netherlands	Ning Zhongyan	China	

=== Day 6: 12 February ===
Sport	Event	Gold medalists			Silver medalists		Bronze medalists		Ref
Sport	Event	Competitors	Team	Rec	Competitors	Team	Competitors	Team	Ref
Alpine skiing	Women's Super-G	Federica Brignone	Italy		Romane Miradoli	France	Cornelia Hütter	Austria	
Cross-country skiing	Women's freestyle	Frida Karlsson	Sweden		Ebba Andersson	Sweden	Jessie Diggins	United States	
Freestyle skiing	Men's moguls	Cooper Woods-Topalovic	Australia		Mikaël Kingsbury	Canada	Ikuma Horishima	Japan	
Luge	Team relay	Julia Taubitz; Tobias Wendl / Tobias Arlt; Max Langenhan; Dajana Eitberger / Magdalena Matschina	Germany		Lisa Schulte; Thomas Steu / Wolfgang Kindl; Jonas Müller; Selina Egle / Lara Kipp	Austria	Verena Hofer; Emanuel Rieder / Simon Kainzwaldner; Dominik Fischnaller; Andrea Vötter / Marion Oberhofer	Italy	
Short-track speed skating	Men's 1000m	Jens van 't Wout	Netherlands		Sun Long	China	Rim Jong-un	South Korea	
Short-track speed skating	Women's 500m	Xandra Velzeboer	Netherlands		Arianna Fontana	Italy	Courtney Sarault	Canada	
Snowboarding	Men's snowboard cross	Alessandro Hämmerle	Austria		Éliot Grondin	Canada	Jakob Dusek	Austria	
Snowboarding	Women's halfpipe	Choi Ga-on	South Korea		Chloe Kim	United States	Mitsuki Ono	Japan	
Speed skating	Women's 5000m	Francesca Lollobrigida	Italy		Merel Conijn	Netherlands	Ragne Wiklund	Norway	

=== Day 7: 13 February ===
Sport	Event	Gold medalists			Silver medalists		Bronze medalists		Ref
Sport	Event	Competitors	Team	Rec	Competitors	Team	Competitors	Team	Ref
Biathlon	Men's sprint	Quentin Fillon Maillet	France		Vetle Sjåstad Christiansen	Norway	Sturla Holm Lægreid	Norway	
Cross-country skiing	Men's freestyle	Johannes Høsflot Klæbo	Norway		Mathis Desloges	France	Einar Hedegart	Norway	
Figure skating	Men's singles	Mikhail Shaidorov	Kazakhstan		Yuma Kagiyama	Japan	Shun Sato	Japan	
Skeleton	Men's	Matt Weston	Great Britain		Axel Jungk	Germany	Christopher Grotheer	Germany	
Snowboarding	Men's halfpipe	Yūto Totsuka	Japan		Scotty James	Australia	Ryusei Yamada	Japan	
Snowboarding	Women's snowboard cross	Josie Baff	Australia		Eva Adamczyková	Czech Republic	Michela Moioli	Italy	
Speed skating	Men's 10,000m	Metoděj Jílek	Czech Republic		Vladimir Semirunniy	Poland	Jorrit Bergsma	Netherlands	

=== Day 8: 14 February ===
Sport	Event	Gold medalists			Silver medalists		Bronze medalists		Ref
Sport	Event	Competitors	Team	Rec	Competitors	Team	Competitors	Team	Ref
Alpine skiing	Men's giant slalom	Lucas Pinheiro Braathen	Brazil		Marco Odermatt	Switzerland	Loïc Meillard	Switzerland	
Biathlon	Women's sprint	Maren Kirkeeide	Norway		Océane Michelon	France	Lou Jeanmonnot	France	
Cross-country skiing	Women's relay	Kristin Austgulen Fosnæs; Astrid Øyre Slind; Karoline Simpson-Larsen; Heidi Weng	Norway		Linn Svahn; Ebba Andersson; Frida Karlsson; Jonna Sundling	Sweden	Johanna Matintalo; Kerttu Niskanen; Vilma Ryytty; Jasmi Joensuu	Finland	
Freestyle skiing	Women's dual moguls	Jakara Anthony	Australia		Jaelin Kauf	United States	Elizabeth Lemley	United States	
Short-track speed skating	Men's 1500m	Jens van 't Wout	Netherlands		Hwang Dae-heon	South Korea	Roberts Krūzbergs	Latvia	
Skeleton	Women's	Janine Flock	Austria		Susanne Kreher	Germany	Jacqueline Pfeifer	Germany	
Ski jumping	Men's large hill individual	Domen Prevc	Slovenia		Ren Nikaidō	Japan	Kacper Tomasiak	Poland	
Speed skating	Men's 500m	Jordan Stolz	United States	OR	Jenning de Boo	Netherlands	Laurent Dubreuil	Canada	

=== Day 9: 15 February ===
Sport	Event	Gold medalists			Silver medalists		Bronze medalists		Ref
Sport	Event	Competitors	Team	Rec	Competitors	Team	Competitors	Team	Ref
Alpine skiing	Women's giant slalom	Federica Brignone	Italy		Thea Louise Stjernesund	Norway	Not awarded due to a tie for silver		
Alpine skiing	Women's giant slalom	Federica Brignone	Italy		Sara Hector	Sweden	Not awarded due to a tie for silver		
Biathlon	Men's pursuit	Martin Ponsiluoma	Sweden		Sturla Holm Lægreid	Norway	Émilien Jacquelin	France	
Biathlon	Women's pursuit	Lisa Vittozzi	Italy		Maren Kirkeeide	Norway	Suvi Minkkinen	Finland	
Cross-country skiing	Men's relay	Emil Iversen; Martin Løwstrøm Nyenget; Einar Hedegart; Johannes Høsflot Klæbo	Norway		Théo Schely; Hugo Lapalus; Mathis Desloges; Victor Lovera	France	Davide Graz; Elia Barp; Martino Carollo; Federico Pellegrino	Italy	
Freestyle skiing	Men's dual moguls	Mikaël Kingsbury	Canada		Ikuma Horishima	Japan	Matt Graham	Australia	
Skeleton	Mixed team	Tabitha Stoecker; Matt Weston	Great Britain		Susanne Kreher; Axel Jungk	Germany	Jacqueline Pfeifer; Christopher Grotheer	Germany	
Ski jumping	Women's large hill individual	Anna Odine Strøm	Norway		Eirin Maria Kvandal	Norway	Nika Prevc	Slovenia	
Snowboarding	Mixed team snowboard cross	Huw Nightingale; Charlotte Bankes	Great Britain		Lorenzo Sommariva; Michela Moioli	Italy	Loan Bozzolo; Léa Casta	France	
Speed skating	Women's 500m	Femke Kok	Netherlands	OR	Jutta Leerdam	Netherlands	Miho Takagi	Japan	

=== Day 10: 16 February ===
Sport	Event	Gold medalists			Silver medalists		Bronze medalists		Ref
Sport	Event	Competitors	Team	Rec	Competitors	Team	Competitors	Team	Ref
Alpine skiing	Men's slalom	Loïc Meillard	Switzerland		Fabio Gstrein	Austria	Henrik Kristoffersen	Norway	
Bobsleigh	Women's monobob	Elana Meyers Taylor	United States		Laura Nolte	Germany	Kaillie Humphries	United States	
Figure skating	Pair skating	Riku Miura; Ryuichi Kihara	Japan		Anastasiia Metelkina; Luka Berulava	Georgia	Minerva Fabienne Hase; Nikita Volodin	Germany	
Freestyle skiing	Women's big air	Megan Oldham	Canada		Eileen Gu	China	Flora Tabanelli	Italy	
Short-track speed skating	Women's 1000m	Xandra Velzeboer	Netherlands		Courtney Sarault	Canada	Kim Gil-li	South Korea	
Ski jumping	Men's team	Jan Hörl; Stephan Embacher	Austria		Paweł Wąsek; Kacper Tomasiak	Poland	Johann André Forfang; Kristoffer Eriksen Sundal	Norway	

=== Day 11: 17 February ===
Sport	Event	Gold medalists			Silver medalists		Bronze medalists		Ref
Sport	Event	Competitors	Team	Rec	Competitors	Team	Competitors	Team	Ref
Biathlon	Men's relay	Fabien Claude; Émilien Jacquelin; Quentin Fillon Maillet; Éric Perrot	France		Martin Uldal; Johan-Olav Botn; Sturla Holm Lægreid; Vetle Sjåstad Christiansen	Norway	Viktor Brandt; Jesper Nelin; Martin Ponsiluoma; Sebastian Samuelsson	Sweden	
Bobsleigh	Two-man	Johannes Lochner; Georg Fleischhauer	Germany		Francesco Friedrich; Alexander Schüller	Germany	Adam Ammour; Alexander Schaller	Germany	
Freestyle skiing	Men's big air	Tormod Frostad	Norway		Mac Forehand	United States	Matěj Švancer	Austria	
Nordic combined	Individual large hill/10 km	Jens Lurås Oftebro	Norway		Johannes Lamparter	Austria	Ilkka Herola	Finland	
Speed skating	Men's team pursuit	Davide Ghiotto; Andrea Giovannini; Michele Malfatti	Italy		Ethan Cepuran; Casey Dawson; Emery Lehman	United States	Li Wenhao; Liu Hanbin; Wu Yu	China	
Speed skating	Women's team pursuit	Ivanie Blondin; Valérie Maltais; Isabelle Weidemann	Canada		Joy Beune; Marijke Groenewoud; Antoinette Rijpma-de Jong	Netherlands	Momoka Horikawa; Hana Noake; Ayano Sato; Miho Takagi	Japan	

- The Women's slopestyle snowboarding final scheduled for February 17th was postponed to the following afternoon due to heavy snow overnight and into the morning.

=== Day 12: 18 February ===
Sport	Event	Gold medalists			Silver medalists		Bronze medalists		Ref
Sport	Event	Competitors	Team	Rec	Competitors	Team	Competitors	Team	Ref
Alpine skiing	Women's slalom	Mikaela Shiffrin	United States		Camille Rast	Switzerland	Anna Swenn-Larsson	Sweden	
Biathlon	Women's relay	Camille Bened; Lou Jeanmonnot; Océane Michelon; Julia Simon	France		Linn Gestblom; Anna Magnusson; Elvira Öberg; Hanna Öberg	Sweden	Marthe Kråkstad Johansen; Juni Arnekleiv; Karoline Offigstad Knotten; Maren Kirkeeide	Norway	
Cross-country skiing	Men's team sprint	Einar Hedegart; Johannes Høsflot Klæbo	Norway		Ben Ogden; Gus Schumacher	United States	Elia Barp; Federico Pellegrino	Italy	
Cross-country skiing	Women's team sprint	Jonna Sundling; Maja Dahlqvist	Sweden		Nadja Kälin; Nadine Fähndrich	Switzerland	Laura Gimmler; Coletta Rydzek	Germany	
Freestyle skiing	Women's aerials	Xu Mengtao	China		Danielle Scott	Australia	Shao Qi	China	
Short-track speed skating	Men's 500m	Steven Dubois	Canada		Melle van 't Wout	Netherlands	Jens van 't Wout	Netherlands	
Short-track speed skating	Women's relay	Choi Min-jeong; Kim Gil-li; Lee So-yeon; Noh Do-hee; Shim Suk-hee	South Korea		Elisa Confortola; Arianna Fontana; Chiara Betti; Arianna Sighel	Italy	Danaé Blais; Florence Brunelle; Kim Boutin; Courtney Sarault	Canada	
Snowboarding	Men's slopestyle	Su Yiming	China		Taiga Hasegawa	Japan	Jake Canter	United States	
Snowboarding	Women's slopestyle	Mari Fukada	Japan		Zoi Sadowski-Synnott	New Zealand	Kokomo Murase	Japan	

=== Day 13: 19 February ===
Sport	Event	Gold medalists			Silver medalists		Bronze medalists		Ref
Sport	Event	Competitors	Team	Rec	Competitors	Team	Competitors	Team	Ref
Figure skating	Women's singles	Alysa Liu	United States		Kaori Sakamoto	Japan	Ami Nakai	Japan	
Ice hockey	Women's	United States women's team	United States		Canada women's team	Canada	Switzerland women's team	Switzerland	
Nordic combined	Team large hill/2 × 7.5 km	Andreas Skoglund; Jens Lurås Oftebro	Norway		Ilkka Herola; Eero Hirvonen	Finland	Stefan Rettenegger; Johannes Lamparter	Austria	
Ski mountaineering	Men's sprint	Oriol Cardona	Spain		Nikita Filippov	Individual Neutral Athletes	Thibault Anselmet	France	
Ski mountaineering	Women's sprint	Marianne Fatton	Switzerland		Emily Harrop	France	Ana Alonso	Spain	
Speed skating	Men's 1500m	Ning Zhongyan	China	OR	Jordan Stolz	United States	Kjeld Nuis	Netherlands	

=== Day 14: 20 February ===
Sport	Event	Gold medalists			Silver medalists		Bronze medalists		Ref
Sport	Event	Competitors	Team	Rec	Competitors	Team	Competitors	Team	Ref
Biathlon	Men's mass start	Johannes Dale-Skjevdal	Norway		Sturla Holm Lægreid	Norway	Quentin Fillon Maillet	France	
Freestyle skiing	Men's aerials	Wang Xindi	China		Noé Roth	Switzerland	Li Tianma	China	
Freestyle skiing	Men's halfpipe	Alex Ferreira	United States		Henry Sildaru	Estonia	Brendan Mackay	Canada	
Freestyle skiing	Women's ski cross	Daniela Maier	Germany		Fanny Smith	Switzerland	Sandra Näslund	Sweden	
Short-track speed skating	Men's relay	Teun Boer; Itzhak de Laat; Friso Emons; Jens van 't Wout; Melle van 't Wout	Netherlands		Hwang Dae-heon; Lee Jeong-min; Lee June-seo; Rim Jong-un; Shin Dong-min	South Korea	Pietro Sighel; Thomas Nadalini; Luca Spechenhauser; Andrea Cassinelli	Italy	
Short-track speed skating	Women's 1500m	Kim Gil-li	South Korea		Choi Min-jeong	South Korea	Corinne Stoddard	United States	
Speed skating	Women's 1500m	Antoinette Rijpma-de Jong	Netherlands		Ragne Wiklund	Norway	Valérie Maltais	Canada	

=== Day 15: 21 February ===
Figure skating

- The non-medal figure skating gala event was also held in the evening.

Sport	Event	Gold medalists			Silver medalists		Bronze medalists		Ref
Sport	Event	Competitors	Team	Rec	Competitors	Team	Competitors	Team	Ref
Biathlon	Women's mass start	Océane Michelon	France		Julia Simon	France	Tereza Voborníková	Czech Republic	
Bobsleigh	Two-woman	Laura Nolte; Deborah Levi	Germany		Lisa Buckwitz; Neele Schuten	Germany	Kaillie Humphries; Jasmine Jones	United States	
Cross-country skiing	Men's classical	Johannes Høsflot Klæbo	Norway		Martin Løwstrøm Nyenget	Norway	Emil Iversen	Norway	
Curling	Men's (Note: Bronze medalists were determined the previous day.)	Brad Jacobs; Marc Kennedy; Brett Gallant; Ben Hebert; Tyler Tardi	Canada		Bruce Mouat; Grant Hardie; Bobby Lammie; Hammy McMillan Jr. Kyle Waddell	Great Britain	Benoît Schwarz-van Berkel; Yannick Schwaller; Sven Michel; Pablo Lachat-Couchepin; Kim Schwaller	Switzerland	
Freestyle skiing	Men's ski cross	Simone Deromedis	Italy		Federico Tomasoni	Italy	Alex Fiva	Switzerland	
Freestyle skiing	Mixed team aerials	Kaila Kuhn; Connor Curran; Christopher Lillis	United States		Lina Kozomara; Pirmin Werner; Noé Roth	Switzerland	Xu Mengtao; Wang Xindi; Li Tianma	China	
Ski mountaineering	Mixed relay	Emily Harrop; Thibault Anselmet	France		Marianne Fatton; Jon Kistler	Switzerland	Ana Alonso; Oriol Cardona	Spain	
Speed skating	Men's mass start	Jorrit Bergsma	Netherlands		Viktor Hald Thorup	Denmark	Andrea Giovannini	Italy	
Speed skating	Women's mass start	Marijke Groenewoud	Netherlands		Ivanie Blondin	Canada	Mia Kilburg	United States	

=== Day 16: 22 February ===
Closing ceremony

- The closing ceremony was held in Verona Arena.

Sport	Event	Gold medalists			Silver medalists		Bronze medalists		Ref
Sport	Event	Competitors	Team	Rec	Competitors	Team	Competitors	Team	Ref
Bobsleigh	Four-man	Johannes Lochner; Thorsten Margis; Jörn Wenzel; Georg Fleischhauer	Germany		Francesco Friedrich; Matthias Sommer; Alexander Schüller; Felix Straub	Germany	Michael Vogt; Andreas Haas; Amadou David Ndiaye; Mario Aeberhard	Switzerland	
Cross-country skiing	Women's classical	Ebba Andersson	Sweden		Heidi Weng	Norway	Nadja Kälin	Switzerland	
Curling	Women's	Anna Hasselborg; Sara McManus; Agnes Knochenhauer; Sofia Scharback; Johanna Heldin	Sweden		Alina Pätz; Silvana Tirinzoni; Carole Howald; Selina Witschonke; Stefanie Berset	Switzerland	Rachel Homan; Tracy Fleury; Emma Miskew; Sarah Wilkes; Rachelle Brown	Canada	
Freestyle skiing	Women's halfpipe	Eileen Gu	China		Li Fanghui	China	Zoe Atkin	Great Britain	
Ice hockey	Men's	United States men's team	United States		Canada men's team	Canada	Finland men's team	Finland	
