= FIS Freestyle Ski and Snowboarding World Championships 2025 – Men's aerials =

Men's aerials at the FIS Freestyle Ski and Snowboarding World Championships 2025
- Location: Corviglia, Switzerland
- Dates: 29 March (qualification); 30 March (final)
- Winning points: 143.31

Medalists
gold medal	Noé Roth	Switzerland
silver medal	Quinn Dehlinger	United States
bronze medal	Pirmin Werner	Switzerland

The Men's aerials competition at the FIS Freestyle Ski and Snowboarding World Championships 2025 was held on 29 and 30 March 2025.

== Qualification ==
The qualification was started on 29 March at 14:15.

Rank	Bib	Start order	Name	Country	Q1	Q2	Notes
1	6	2	Quinn Dehlinger	United States	122.17		Q
2	9	12	Pirmin Werner	Switzerland	121.72		Q
3	3	22	Wang Xindi	China	116.37		Q
4	2	17	Noé Roth	Switzerland	115.38		Q
5	5	5	Christopher Lillis	United States	114.48		Q
6	15	21	Connor Curran	United States	112.83		Q
7	16	4	Victor Primeau	Canada	107.52	113.40	Q
8	10	11	Alexandre Duchaine	Canada	102.71	111.95	Q
9	4	15	Sun Jiaxu	China	111.95	89.59	Q
10	11	14	Lewis Irving	Canada	111.06	98.64	Q
11	18	8	Oleksandr Okipniuk	Ukraine	108.60	78.32	Q
12	13	16	Maksym Kuznietsov	Ukraine	107.71	80.59	Q
13	12	18	Miha Fontaine	Canada	99.55	104.87	
14	20	19	Ian Schoenwald	United States	100.44	68.04	
15	1	25	Qi Guangpu	China	85.40	98.64	
16	19	6	Assylkhan Assan	Kazakhstan	92.70	97.50	
17	8	24	Dmytro Kotovskyi	Ukraine	87.61	97.24	
18	21	20	Dinmukhammed Raimkulov	Kazakhstan	73.89	97.20	
19	23	10	Sherzod Khashyrbayev	Kazakhstan	95.88	90.24	
20	24	13	Haruto Igarashi	Japan	87.50	63.36	
21	7	7	Li Tianma	China	79.65	84.16	
22	17	9	Nicholas Novak	Czech Republic	61.50	63.99	
23	22	1	Reilly Flanagan	Australia	63.00	56.84	
24	25	3	Ulanbakir Umurzakov	Kazakhstan	39.48	DNS	
	14	23	Volodymyr Kushnir	Ukraine	Did not start		

== Final ==
The first run was started on 30 March at 15:04 and the second run at 15:40.

Rank	Bib	Name	Country	Final 1	Final 2
1st place, gold medalist(s)	2	Noé Roth	Switzerland	126.11	143.31
2nd place, silver medalist(s)	6	Quinn Dehlinger	United States	129.21	123.53
3rd place, bronze medalist(s)	9	Pirmin Werner	Switzerland	120.36	107.12
4	10	Alexandre Duchaine	Canada	105.75	105.21
5	18	Oleksandr Okipniuk	Ukraine	111.76	87.21
6	3	Wang Xindi	China	116.29	87.00
7	5	Christopher Lillis	United States	103.98	—
8	16	Victor Primeau	Canada	103.10	—
9	4	Sun Jiaxu	China	98.64	—
10	13	Maksym Kuznietsov	Ukraine	96.39	—
11	11	Lewis Irving	Canada	93.00	—
12	15	Connor Curran	United States	91.15	—
