= Oksana Yatsiuk =

Ukrainian freestyle skier (born 2006)

Personal information
- Full name: Оксана Миколаївна Яцюк
- Born: 5 May 2006 (age 20) Ivano-Frankivsk oblast, Ukraine

Sport
- Sport: Freestyle skiing
- Event: Aerials

Oksana Mykolaiivna Yatsiuk (Ukrainian: Оксана Миколаївна Яцюк; born 5 May 2006) is a Ukrainian freestyle skier specializing in aerials. She represented Ukraine at the 2026 Winter Olympics.

== Career ==
Popovych debuted at the international level in January 2022 when she competed at the European Cup in Minsk. On 5 February, she won her first international competition which was the European Cup in Krasiya, Ukraine. Later that year, she finished 12th at the Junior World Championships. On 18 January 2025, she debuted in the World Cup competitions, finishing 19th in Lake Placid.

In January 2026, she won a quota to represent Ukraine at the 2026 Winter Olympics. At the Olympics, she finished 20th, competing with an injured knee.

== Results ==
=== Olympic Winter Games ===
Year	Age	Aerials
(Italy) 2026 Milano Cortina	19	20

=== World Championships ===
Year	Age	Aerials	Mixed Team Aerials
(Switzerland) 2025 Engadin	18	14	—

=== World Cup ===
==== Individual rankings ====
Season	Aerials
2024–25	23
2025–26	32

=== European Cup ===
==== Podiums ====
Season	Place	Rank
2021–22	Krasiya, Ukraine	1
2023–24	Airolo, Switzerland	3
2023–24	Airolo, Switzerland	3
2023–24	Chiesa in Valmalenco, Italy	3
2024–25	Airolo, Switzerland	1
2024–25	Airolo, Switzerland	1
2024–25	Airolo, Switzerland	3
2025–26	Airolo, Switzerland	1
