= Tasia Tanner =

American freestyle skier (born 2002)

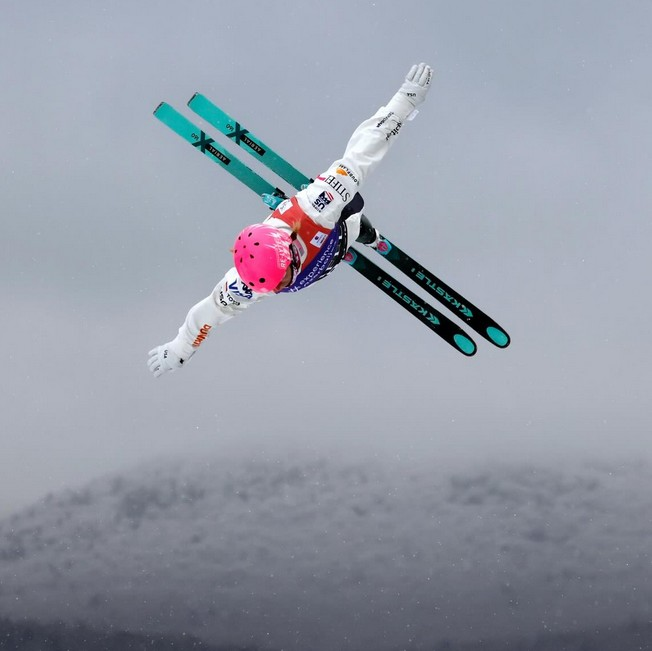

Personal information
- Born: July 26, 2002 (age 23) Salt Lake City, Utah, U.S.

Sport
- Country: United States
- Sport: Freestyle skiing
- Event: Aerials
- Club: Park City Ski & Snowboard

Tasia Tanner (born July 26, 2002) is an American freestyle skier specializing in aerials. She represented the United States at the 2026 Winter Olympics.

== Career ==
Tanner grew up in Salt Lake City and Park City, Utah, skiing from age two and competing from age seven. Tanner attended Rowland Hall before switching to The Winter Sports School to pursue alpine skiing. After a knee injury, she transitioned to freestyle. She made her World Cup debut in 2021 in Deer Valley, experimenting with big air and big mountain before committing to aerials.

Tanner was named the FIS Rookie of the Year in aerials for the 2023-24 season, where she had six top-ten finishes and helped the US win the Nation's Cup in aerials. She also won the overall NorAm Cup that season.

At the 2025 FIS Freestyle Ski World Championships, Tanner finished 15th in women's aerials. Tanner was named to the US roster for the 2026 Winter Olympics, where she made the final and finished 11th.

== Personal life ==
Tanner graduated from the University of Utah with a bachelor's degree in information systems and master's degree in cybersecurity. Outside skiing, she works as an IT manager in Park City, Utah.

== Results ==
=== Olympic Winter Games ===
Year	Age	Aerials
(Italy) 2026 Milano Cortina	23	11

=== World Championships ===
Year	Age	Aerials
(Switzerland) 2025 Engadin	22	16
