= Marion Thénault =

Canadian freestyle skier (born 2000)

Marion Thénault OLY
Personal information
- Nationality: Canada
- Born: April 9, 2000 (age 26) Sherbrooke, Quebec

Sport
- Sport: Skiing

World Cup career
- Seasons: 5 (2020-2024)
- Indiv. starts: 24
- Indiv. podiums: 10
- Indiv. wins: 4
- Team starts: 3
- Discipline titles: 0 – (3rd in AE 2021, 2023, 2024)
Medal record
Women's freestyle skiing
Representing Canada
Olympic Games
Bronze medal – third place	2022 Beijing	Mixed team aerials
- Updated on 10 March 2024

Marion Thénault (born April 9, 2000) is a Canadian freestyle skier, who competes in the aerials discipline. At the 2022 Winter Olympics, Thénault was a part of Canada's bronze medal winning Mixed team aerials.

== Career ==
She was born in Sherbrooke, Quebec.

She competed at the 2021 World Championships, where she placed sixth in the women's aerials.

On January 24, 2022, Thénault was named to Canada's 2022 Olympic team.

== World Cup results ==
=== Race podiums ===
Season
Season	Date	Location	Discipline	Place
2021	23 January 2021	Moscow, Russia	Aerials	3rd
2021	13 March 2021	Almaty, Kazakhstan	Aerials	1st
2022	5 January 2022	Le Relais, Canada	Aerials	2nd
2023	4 December 2022	Ruka, Finland	Aerials	2nd
2023	21 January 2023	Le Relais, Canada	Aerials	1st
2023	3 February 2023	Deer Valley, United States	Aerials	2nd
2023	19 March 2023	Almaty, Kazakhstan	Aerials	3rd
2024	3 December 2023	Ruka, Finland	Aerials	1st
2024	10 February 2024	Lac-Beauport, Canada	Aerials	3rd
2024	10 March 2024	Almaty, Kazakhstan	Aerials	1st

== World Championships results ==
Year	Age	Aerials	Aerials team
(Kazakhstan) 2021 Almaty	20	6	6
(Georgia (country)) 2023 Bakuriani	22	4	5
(Switzerland) 2025 Engadin	24	5	5

== Olympic results ==
Year	Age	Aerials	Aerials team
(China) 2022 Beijing	21	7	3
(Italy) 2026 Milano Cortina	25	7	5
