= Chen Meiting =

Chinese freestyle skier (born 2005)

Personal information
- Born: 3 April 2005 (age 21) Anhui, China

Sport
- Sport: Freestyle skiing
- Event: Aerials
Medal record
Women's freestyle skiing
Representing China
Asian Winter Games
Silver medal – second place	2025 Harbin	Synchro aerials

Chen Meiting (born 3 April 2005) is a Chinese freestyle skier specializing in aerials.

== Career ==
During the 2023–24 FIS Freestyle Ski World Cup, Chen earned her first career World Cup podium on 17 December 2023, finishing in second place in the team event. She earned her first career individual podium on 11 February 2024, finishing in second place in the aerials event, with a score of 88.12 points.

In February 2025, Chen competed at the 2025 Asian Winter Games and won a silver medal in the synchro aerials event, along with Xu Mengtao. In January 2026, she was selected to represent China at the 2026 Winter Olympics.

== Results ==
=== Olympic Winter Games ===
Year	Age	Aerials
(Italy) 2026 Milano Cortina	20	9

=== World Championships ===
Year	Age	Aerials
(Georgia (country)) 2023 Bakuriani	18	11
(Switzerland) 2025 Engadin	20	10
