= Abbey Willcox =

Australian freestyle skier (born 1996)

Personal information
- Born: 27 November 1996 (age 29) North Gosford, Australia

Sport
- Country: Australia
- Sport: Freestyle skiing
- Event: Aerials

World Cup career
- Indiv. starts: 34
- Indiv. podiums: 3
- Indiv. wins: 0
- Team starts: 2
- Team podiums: 1
- Team wins: 0
Medal record
World Cup race podiums
Event	1st	2nd	3rd
Aerials	0	0	3
Aerials Team	0	0	1
Total	0	0	4
- Updated on 3 March 2026

Abbey Willcox (born 27 November 1996) is an Australian freestyle skier specialising in aerials. She represented Australia at the 2026 Winter Olympics.

== Career ==
During the 2019–20 FIS Freestyle Ski World Cup, Willcox earned her first career World Cup podium on 7 February 2020, finishing in third place in the aerials event. During the 2023–24 FIS Freestyle Ski World Cup, she earned her second career World Cup podium on 2 February 2024, again finishing in third place. During the 2024–25 FIS Freestyle Ski World Cup, she earned her first career podium in the mixed team aerials event on 19 January 2025, finishing in third place. This was Australia's first aerial skiing mixed‑team World Cup medal since 2017. On 7 February 2025, she finished third in the aerials event, in an Australian podium sweep.

In January 2026, she was selected to represent Australia at the 2026 Winter Olympics. She qualified for the women's final, finishing tenth with a jump of 88.83. Along with silver medalist Danielle Scott and Reilly Flanagan, the Australian mixed aerials team qualified for the gold medal final, finishing fourth with a score of 256.04 from their three jumps.

== Sports administration and professional career ==
Outside of her competitive skiing career, Willcox has established a professional path in sports administration and athlete advocacy. She is a vocal proponent of the "dual-career" model, frequently speaking at industry events about the transferability of elite athletic skills to corporate environments.

Willcox holds a Bachelor of Business from Swinburne University of Technology, which she completed while balancing the demands of international competition. Since 2022, she has worked for the Brisbane Broncos in the National Rugby League (NRL) as a Game Day Coordinator. She has credited this professional role as a vital "protective factor" for her mental health, noting that her career in the NRL provides a sense of identity and purpose separate from her sporting results.

=== Advocacy and mentorship ===
A dedicated advocate for athlete wellbeing, Willcox is an ambassador for the Australian Institute of Sport (AIS) Mental Fitness Program. In this role, she works to normalize conversations around mental health and resilience, drawing on her own experiences with long-term injury and selection setbacks. She is particularly focused on mentoring the next generation of athletes to build a multi-dimensional identity that extends beyond their athletic performance.

== Results ==
=== Olympic Winter Games ===
As of 3 March 2026

Year	Age	Aerials	Team aerials
(Italy) 2026 Milano Cortina	29	10	4

=== World Championships ===
As of 3 March 2026

Year	Age	Aerials	Team aerials
(Switzerland) 2025 Engadin	28	13	

=== World Cup results by season ===
As of 3 March 2026

Season	Aerials					Team aerials			Overall Freestyle skiing	
Season	Events started	Pods	Wins	Points	Rank	Events started	Pods	Wins	Points	Rank
2018–19	4/5	0	0	62	16	0/1	–	–	12.40	87
2019–20	6/7	1	0	181	7	0/1	–	–	25.86	42
2020–21	1/7	0	0	22	33	0/1	–	–	—N/a	—N/a
2021–22	6/6	0	0	87	17	1/2	0	0	—N/a	—N/a
2023–24	4/6	1	0	172	9	0/1	–	–	—N/a	—N/a
2024–25	7/7	1	0	259	5	1/2	1	0	—N/a	—N/a
2025–26	6/6	0	0	160	10	0/1	–	–	—N/a	—N/a
Total	34	3	0	–	–	2	1	0	—N/a	—N/a
