= FIS Freestyle Ski and Snowboarding World Championships 2025 – Mixed team aerials =

Mixed team aerials at the FIS Freestyle Ski and Snowboarding World Championships 2025
- Location: Corviglia, Switzerland
- Dates: 28 March
- Competitors: 21 from 7 nations
- Teams: 7
- Winning points: 344.63

Medalists
gold medal	Kaila Kuhn; Quinn Dehlinger; Christopher Lillis	United States
silver medal	Anhelina Brykina; Oleksandr Okipniuk; Dmytro Kotovskyi	Ukraine
bronze medal	Lina Kozomara; Noé Roth; Pirmin Werner	Switzerland

The Mixed team aerials competition at the FIS Freestyle Ski and Snowboarding World Championships 2025 was held on 28 March 2025.

== Results ==
The first run was started at 11:00 and the second run at 11:50.

Rank	Bib	Country	Final 1	Final 2
1st place, gold medalist(s)	5	United States; Kaila Kuhn; Quinn Dehlinger; Christopher Lillis	322.60; 91.83; 117.65; 113.12	344.63; 100.29; 119.00; 125.34
2nd place, silver medalist(s)	2	Ukraine; Anhelina Brykina; Oleksandr Okipniuk; Dmytro Kotovskyi	286.07; 60.16; 110.86; 115.05	312.35; 57.96; 121.27; 133.12
3rd place, bronze medalist(s)	4	Switzerland; Lina Kozomara; Noé Roth; Pirmin Werner	288.28; 66.04; 124.89; 97.35	281.43; 64.74; 114.03; 102.66
4	3	Australia; Danielle Scott; Laura Peel; Reilly Flanagan	288.89; 91.65; 109.04; 88.20	272.49; 95.52; 103.89; 73.08
5	6	Canada; Marion Thénault; Lewis Irving; Alexandre Duchaine	274.89; 89.83; 79.64; 105.43	Did not advance
6	7	China; Xu Mengtao; Wang Xindi; Qi Guangpu	273.33; 59.61; 94.69; 119.03	Did not advance
7	1	Kazakhstan; Ayana Zholdas; Assylkhan Assan; Dinmukhammed Raimkulov	266.89; 71.50; 96.72; 98.67	Did not advance
