= Freestyle skiing at the 2026 Winter Olympics – Mixed team aerials =

Mixed team aerials at the XXV Olympic Winter Games
- Freestyle skiing
- Venue: Livigno Aerials & Moguls Park, Valtellina
- Date: 21 February 2026
- Competitors: 21 from 7 nations
- Teams: 7
- Winning points: 325.35

Medalists
1st place, gold medalist(s)		Kaila Kuhn; Connor Curran; Christopher Lillis	United States
2nd place, silver medalist(s)		Lina Kozomara; Pirmin Werner; Noé Roth	Switzerland
3rd place, bronze medalist(s)		Xu Mengtao; Wang Xindi; Li Tianma	China

The mixed team aerials competition in freestyle skiing at the 2026 Winter Olympics was held on 21 February at the Livigno Aerials & Moguls Park in Valtellina. The United States, represented by Kaila Kuhn, Connor Curran, and Christopher Lillis, won the event. Switzerland won the silver medal and China won bronze.

== Background ==
The United States were the defending champions. China were the 2022 silver medalists, and Canada the bronze medalists. China won the only event in mixed team aerials at the 2025–26 FIS Freestyle Ski World Cup before the Olympics. The United States were the 2025 World champions.

== Results ==
Rank	Bib	Country	Final 1	Final 2
1st place, gold medalist(s)	5; 5–1; 5–2; 5–3	United States; Kaila Kuhn; Connor Curran; Christopher Lillis	351.23; 106.89; 120.36; 123.98	325.35; 94.44; 113.72; 117.19
2nd place, silver medalist(s)	3; 3–1; 3–2; 3–3	Switzerland; Lina Kozomara; Pirmin Werner; Noé Roth	278.48; 48.72; 102.26; 127.50	296.91; 44.37; 123.00; 129.54
3rd place, bronze medalist(s)	1; 1–1; 1–2; 1–3	China; Xu Mengtao; Wang Xindi; Li Tianma	315.02; 81.99; 116.29; 116.74	279.68; 96.59; 87.72; 95.37
4	6; 6–1; 6–2; 6–3	Australia; Abbey Willcox; Danielle Scott; Reilly Flanagan	289.04; 81.78; 120.20; 87.06	256.04; 64.86; 95.30; 95.88
5	2; 2–1; 2–2; 2–3	Canada; Marion Thénault; Miha Fontaine; Lewis Irving	268.45; 65.25; 107.73; 95.47	—N/a
6	4; 4–1; 4–2; 4–3	Ukraine; Anhelina Brykina; Oleksandr Okipniuk; Dmytro Kotovskyi	254.67; 90.58; 76.92; 87.17	—N/a
7	7; 7–1; 7–2; 7–3	Kazakhstan; Ayana Zholdas; Roman Ivanov; Assylkhan Assan	213.93; 49.77; 79.65; 84.51	—N/a
