= Runa Igarashi =

Japanese freestyle skier (born 2004)

Personal information
- Born: 1 October 2004 (age 21) Hokkaido, Japan

Sport
- Sport: Freestyle skiing
- Event: Aerials
Medal record
Women's freestyle skiing
Representing Japan
Asian Winter Games
Bronze medal – third place	2025 Harbin	Mixed team aerials

Runa Igarashi (五十嵐瑠奈, Igarashi Runa; born 1 October 2004) is a Japanese freestyle skier specializing in aerials. She represented Japan at the 2026 Winter Olympics.

== Career ==
In February 2025, Igarashi competed at the 2025 Asian Winter Games and won a bronze medal in the mixed team aerials event. In January 2026, she was selected to represent Japan at the 2026 Winter Olympics.

== Personal life ==
Igarashi's older brother, Haruto, is also an Olympic freestyle skier.

== Results ==
=== Olympic Winter Games ===
Year	Age	Aerials
(Italy) 2026 Milano Cortina	21	24

=== World Championships ===
Year	Age	Aerials
(Switzerland) 2025 Engadin	20	19
