= Kyra Dossa =

American freestyle skier (born 2004)

Personal information
- Born: January 24, 2004 (age 22) Cleveland, Ohio, U.S.

Sport
- Country: United States
- Sport: Freestyle skiing
- Event: Aerials

Kyra Dossa (born January 24, 2004) is an American freestyle skier specializing in aerials. She represented the United States at the 2026 Winter Olympics.

== Career ==
Dossa competed in gymnastics from an early age, winning a state championship in vault at Walsh Jesuit High School. Although she learned to ski at age three, Dossa did not try freestyle skiing until age 17, when she met Carrie Miller, a retired aerials coach, on a family vacation. After attending a five-day training camp at Utah Olympic Park, she committed to the sport. During her second aerial jump on snow, she tore her ACL, requiring surgery.

Dossa made her World Cup debut during the 2023-24 season at Deer Valley, placing 8th. Her career best World Cup result to date is fourth place in Ruka, Finland. Dossa was named to the U.S. Olympic team for the 2026 Winter Olympics, after only three years of dedicated training for aerials. She finished 14th in qualification, failing to make the finals.

== Personal life ==
Dossa attends the University of Utah.

== Results ==
=== Olympic Winter Games ===
Year	Age	Aerials
(Italy) 2026 Milano Cortina	22	14
