= Kaila Kuhn =

American freestyle skier (born 2003)

Personal information
- Born: April 8, 2003 (age 23) Boyne City, Michigan, U.S.

Sport
- Country: United States
- Sport: Freestyle skiing
- Event: Aerials
Medal record
Women's freestyle skiing
Representing the United States
Olympic Games
Gold medal – first place	2026 Milano Cortina	Mixed team aerials
World Championships
Gold medal – first place	2025 Engadin	Aerials
Gold medal – first place	2025 Engadin	Mixed team aerials

Kaila Kuhn (born April 8, 2003) is an American freestyle skier specializing in aerials. She represented the United States at the 2022 and 2026 Winter Olympics.

== Career ==
Kuhn made her FIS Freestyle World Ski Championships debut in 2019, where she was the youngest member of the U.S. national aerials team.

Kuhn was selected to represent the United States at the 2022 Winter Olympics. She competed in the aerials event and finished in eighth place with 85.68 points.

She competed at the 2025 FIS Freestyle Ski World Championships and won a gold medal in the aerials event with a score of 105.13 points She also won a gold medal in the mixed team aerials event with a score of 344.63 points. She became the first aerialist to win two gold medals at a single World Championship. The United States became the first country to win consecutive FIS Freestyle World Ski Championships gold medals in the team aerials event.

During the final aerials competition of the 2025–26 FIS Freestyle Ski World Cup season on January 12, 2026, she earned her first career World Cup victory. She finished the season in third place in the overall World Cup standings.

In January 2026, she was again selected to represent the United States at the 2026 Winter Olympics. On February 19, 2026, she competed in the aerials event and finished in fifth place. On February 21, 2026, she won a gold medal in the mixed team aerials, along with Connor Curran and Christopher Lillis.

== Results ==
=== Olympic Winter Games ===
Year	Age	Aerials	Mixed Team Aerials
(China) 2022 Beijing	18	8	–
(Italy) 2026 Milano Cortina	22	5	1

=== World Championships ===
Year	Age	Aerials	Mixed Team Aerials
(United States) 2019 Deer Valley	15	13	–
(Georgia (country)) 2023 Bakuriani	19	5	–
(Switzerland) 2025 Engadin	21	1	1
