= Nelli Popovych =

Ukrainian freestyle skier (born 2004)

Personal information
- Full name: Неллі Василівна Попович
- Born: 23 July 2007 (age 18) Berehove, Ukraine

Sport
- Sport: Freestyle skiing
- Event: Aerials

Nelli Vasylivna Popovych (Ukrainian: Неллі Василівна Попович; born 23 July 2007) is a Ukrainian freestyle skier specializing in aerials. She represented Ukraine at the 2026 Winter Olympics.

== Career ==
Popovych debuted at the international level in February 2022 when she competed at the European Cup in Krasiya, which is located in her home region, Zakarpattia Oblast. Later that year, she finished 11th at the Junior World Championships. On 6 December 2025, she debuted in the World Cup competitions.

In January 2026, she received a relocated quota to represent Ukraine at the 2026 Winter Olympics.

== Results ==
=== Olympic Winter Games ===
Year	Age	Aerials
(Italy) 2026 Milano Cortina	18	19

=== World Cup ===
==== Individual rankings ====
Season	Aerials
2025–26	25

=== European Cup ===
==== Podiums ====
Season	Place	Event	Rank
2022–23	Obertauern, Austria	Individual	1
