= Anhelina Brykina =

Ukrainian freestyle skier (born 2004)

Personal information
- Full name: Ангеліна Павлівна Брикіна
- Born: 8 August 2004 (age 21) Ivano-Frankivsk, Ukraine

Sport
- Sport: Freestyle skiing
- Event: Aerials
Medal record
Women's freestyle skiing
Representing Ukraine
World Championships
Silver medal – second place	2025 Engadin	Mixed team aerials
World Junior Championships
Bronze medal – third place	2024 Chiesa in Valmalenco	Aerials

Anhelina Pavlivna Brykina (Ukrainian: Ангеліна Павлівна Брикіна; born 8 August 2004) is a Ukrainian freestyle skier specializing in aerials. She represented Ukraine at the 2026 Winter Olympics.

== Career ==
Brykina represented Ukraine at the 2025 FIS Freestyle Ski World Championships and won a silver medal in the mixed team aerials, along with Oleksandr Okipniuk and Dmytro Kotovskyi. She also reached the finals of the aerials event, finishing in ninth place.

In January 2026, she was selected to represent Ukraine at the 2026 Winter Olympics.

== Personal life ==
Brykina's father, Pavlo Brykin, served in the 58th Motorized Brigade during the Russo-Ukrainian war. He was killed in action on 6 August 2022, during a battle with a Russian sabotage and reconnaissance group near the village of Blahodatne. For her 2026 Olympic aerials qualifying run, Brykina wrote the phrase "Glory to the Armed Forces of Ukraine" on her skis.

== Results ==
=== Olympic Winter Games ===
Year	Age	Aerials
(Italy) 2026 Milano Cortina	21	13

=== World Championships ===
Year	Age	Aerials	Mixed Team Aerials
(Georgia (country)) 2023 Bakuriani	18	15	–
(Switzerland) 2025 Engadin	20	9	2
