= FIS Freestyle Ski and Snowboarding World Championships 2023 – Women's aerials =

Women's aerials at the FIS Freestyle Ski and Snowboarding World Championships 2023
- Location: Bakuriani, Georgia
- Dates: 21 February (qualification); 23 February
- Competitors: 19 from 7 nations
- Winning points: 85.30

Medalists
| gold medal | Kong Fanyu | China |
| silver medal | Danielle Scott | Australia |
| bronze medal | Anastasiya Novosad | Ukraine |

The Women's aerials competition at the FIS Freestyle Ski and Snowboarding World Championships 2023 was held on 21 and 23 February 2023.

== Qualification ==
The qualification was started on 21 February at 10:30. The twelve best skiers qualified for the final.

| Rank | Bib | Start order | Name | Country | Q1 | Q2 | Notes |
|---|---|---|---|---|---|---|---|
| 1 | 1 | 8 | Danielle Scott | Australia | 99.40 | | Q |
| 2 | 2 | 2 | Marion Thénault | Canada | 96.93 | | Q |
| 3 | 18 | 10 | Chen Meiting | China | 89.88 | | Q |
| 4 | 5 | 6 | Ashley Caldwell | United States | 89.18 | | Q |
| 5 | 3 | 5 | Laura Peel | Australia | 87.57 | | Q |
| 6 | 21 | 7 | Liu Xuanchi | China | 86.94 | | Q |
| 7 | 4 | 12 | Kaila Kuhn | United States | 79.38 | 88.47 | Q |
| 8 | 11 | 18 | Zhanbota Aldabergenova | Kazakhstan | 84.10 | DNS | Q |
| 9 | 9 | 3 | Olga Polyuk | Ukraine | 81.58 | 78.01 | Q |
| 10 | 16 | 20 | Kong Fanyu | China | 51.11 | 80.95 | Q |
| 11 | 6 | 13 | Anastasiya Novosad | Ukraine | 80.32 | 80.01 | Q |
| 12 | 7 | 19 | Emma Weiß | Germany | 74.65 | 80.04 | Q |
| 13 | 22 | 16 | Shao Qi | China | 75.91 | 78.88 | |
| 14 | 14 | 1 | Airleigh Frigo | Australia | 78.88 | 48.36 | |
| 15 | 13 | 14 | Anhelina Brykina | Ukraine | 69.54 | 60.58 | |
| 16 | 8 | 17 | Winter Vinecki | United States | 66.97 | 68.04 | |
| 17 | 12 | 4 | Anastasiia Hasiuk | Ukraine | DNF | 67.28 | |
| 18 | 19 | 11 | Ayana Zholdas | Kazakhstan | 62.37 | 62.98 | |
| 19 | 17 | 15 | Megan Nick | United States | 57.81 | DNF | |
| | 20 | 9 | Ardana Makhanova | Kazakhstan | Did not start | | |

== Final ==
The first run was started at 12:30 and the second run at 13:14.

| Rank | Bib | Name | Country | Final 1 | Final 2 |
|---|---|---|---|---|---|
| 1st place, gold medalist(s) | 16 | Kong Fanyu | China | 84.42 | 85.30 |
| 2nd place, silver medalist(s) | 1 | Danielle Scott | Australia | 82.97 | 83.84 |
| 3rd place, bronze medalist(s) | 6 | Anastasiya Novosad | Ukraine | 89.88 | 82.84 |
| 4 | 2 | Marion Thénault | Canada | 93.06 | 77.19 |
| 5 | 4 | Kaila Kuhn | United States | 84.10 | 76.84 |
| 6 | 11 | Zhanbota Aldabergenova | Kazakhstan | 85.36 | 60.61 |
| 7 | 3 | Laura Peel | Australia | 80.29 | — |
| 8 | 7 | Emma Weiß | Germany | 79.38 | — |
| 9 | 9 | Olga Polyuk | Ukraine | 66.15 | — |
| 10 | 5 | Ashley Caldwell | United States | 64.26 | — |
| 11 | 18 | Chen Meiting | China | 61.68 | — |
| 12 | 21 | Liu Xuanchi | China | 55.75 | — |
