= Freestyle skiing at the 2025 Asian Winter Games – Women's aerials =

Women's aerials at the 2025 Asian Winter Games
- Venue: Yabuli Ski Resort
- Dates: 9 February 2025
- Competitors: 7 from 3 nations

Medalists
gold medal	Xu Mengtao	China
silver medal	Chen Xuezheng	China
bronze medal	Ayana Zholdas	Kazakhstan

The women's aerials at the 2025 Asian Winter Games was held on 9 February 2025 at Yabuli Ski Resort in Harbin, China.

== Schedule ==
All times are China Standard Time (UTC+08:00)

Date	Time	Event
Sunday, 9 February 2025	10:00	Final 1
Sunday, 9 February 2025	10:40	Final 2

== Results ==
Legend

- DNF — Did not finish
- DNS — Did not start

=== Final 1 ===
Rank	Athlete	Jump 1	Jump 2	Best
1	Xu Mengtao (CHN)	97.99	DNS	97.99
2	Chen Meiting (CHN)	80.96	DNF	80.96
3	Feng Junxi (CHN)	76.23	DNF	76.23
4	Chen Xuezheng (CHN)	39.44	72.45	72.45
5	Ayana Zholdas (KAZ)	65.52	DNF	65.52
6	Runa Igarashi (JPN)	37.18	45.30	45.30
7	Ardana Makhanova (KAZ)	DNS	39.56	39.56

=== Final 2 ===
Rank	Athlete	Score
1st place, gold medalist(s)	Xu Mengtao (CHN)	90.94
2nd place, silver medalist(s)	Chen Xuezheng (CHN)	81.58
3rd place, bronze medalist(s)	Ayana Zholdas (KAZ)	76.54
4	Chen Meiting (CHN)	71.97
5	Feng Junxi (CHN)	71.50
6	Runa Igarashi (JPN)	52.00
