= FIS Freestyle Ski and Snowboarding World Championships 2025 – Women's aerials =

Women's aerials at the FIS Freestyle Ski and Snowboarding World Championships 2025
- Location: Corviglia, Switzerland
- Dates: 29 March (qualification); 30 March (final)
- Competitors: 19 from 9 nations
- Winning points: 105.13

Medalists
gold medal	Kaila Kuhn	United States
silver medal	Xu Mengtao	China
bronze medal	Danielle Scott	Australia

The Women's aerials competition at the FIS Freestyle Ski and Snowboarding World Championships 2025 was held on 29 and 30 March 2025.

== Qualification ==
The qualification was started on 29 March at 10:45.

Rank	Bib	Start order	Name	Country	Q1	Q2	Notes
1	7	7	Marion Thénault	Canada	113.33		Q
2	2	12	Xu Mengtao	China	90.24		Q
3	8	8	Shao Qi	China	85.99		Q
4	13	14	Dani Loeb	United States	83.16		Q
5	11	18	Kaila Kuhn	United States	82.97		Q
6	12	15	Chen Xuezheng	China	82.83		Q
7	3	4	Danielle Scott	Australia	75.43	90.09	Q
8	1	19	Laura Peel	Australia	72.76	86.36	Q
9	6	10	Anhelina Brykina	Ukraine	82.21	58.76	Q
10	9	9	Airleigh Frigo	Australia	80.95	79.75	Q
11	4	2	Chen Meiting	China	77.33	75.12	Q
12	15	16	Ayana Zholdas	Kazakhstan	58.90	74.82	Q
13	5	1	Abbey Willcox	Australia	64.86	73.39	
14	18	13	Oksana Yatsiuk	Ukraine	71.81	67.08	
15	10	5	Emma Weiß	Germany	70.24	70.76	
16	14	11	Tasia Tanner	United States	66.70	55.38	
17	17	3	Adéla Měrková	Czech Republic	65.00	DNF	
18	16	6	Charlie Fontaine	Canada	58.29	46.02	
19	19	17	Runa Igarashi	Japan	44.72	51.14	

== Final ==
The first run was started on 30 March at 14:44 and the second run at 15:28.

Rank	Bib	Name	Country	Final 1	Final 2
1st place, gold medalist(s)	2	Kaila Kuhn	United States	87.81	105.13
2nd place, silver medalist(s)	6	Xu Mengtao	China	93.58	99.16
3rd place, bronze medalist(s)	9	Danielle Scott	Australia	98.34	96.93
4	12	Chen Xuezheng	China	87.06	93.41
5	7	Marion Thénault	Canada	104.31	90.15
6	3	Shao Qi	China	87.18	76.32
7	1	Laura Peel	Australia	85.86	—N/a
8	9	Airleigh Frigo	Australia	79.06	—N/a
9	6	Anhelina Brykina	Ukraine	78.75	—N/a
10	4	Chen Meiting	China	77.70	—N/a
11	13	Dani Loeb	United States	77.49	—N/a
12	15	Ayana Zholdas	Kazakhstan	64.57	—N/a
