= Lina Kozomara =

Swiss freestyle skier (born 2005)

Personal information
- Born: 21 July 2005 (age 21) Spreitenbach, Switzerland

Sport
- Country: Switzerland
- Sport: Freestyle skiing
- Event: Aerials
Medal record
Women's freestyle skiing
Representing Switzerland
Olympic Games
Silver medal – second place	2026 Milano Cortina	Mixed team aerials
World Championships
Bronze medal – third place	2025 Engadin	Mixed team aerials

Lina Kozomara (born 21 July 2005) is a Swiss freestyle skier specializing in aerials. She represented Switzerland at the 2026 Winter Olympics.

== Career ==
Kozomara represented Switzerland at the 2025 FIS Freestyle Ski World Championships and won a bronze medal in the mixed team aerials, along with Noé Roth and Pirmin Werner.

In January 2026, she was selected to represent Switzerland at the 2026 Winter Olympics.

== Results ==
=== Olympic Winter Games ===
Year	Age	Aerials
(Italy) 2026 Milano Cortina	20	23
