= Shao Qi =

Chinese freestyle skier (born 2001)

Personal information
- Born: 10 July 2001 (age 24) Liaoning, China

Sport
- Sport: Freestyle skiing
- Event: Aerials
Medal record
Women's freestyle skiing
Representing China
Olympic Games
Bronze medal – third place	2026 Milano Cortina	Aerials

Shao Qi (born 10 July 2001) is a Chinese freestyle skier specializing in aerials. She represented China at the 2022 and 2026 Winter Olympics.

== Career ==
During the 2018–19 FIS Freestyle Ski World Cup, Shao earned her first career World Cup podium on 19 January 2019, finishing in second place in the aerials event.

She competed at the 2025 FIS Freestyle Ski World Championships and advanced to the finals, finishing in sixth place. In January 2026, she was selected to represent China at the 2026 Winter Olympics. She won a bronze medal in the aerials event with a score of 101.90.

== Results ==
=== Olympic Winter Games ===
Year	Age	Aerials
(China) 2022 Beijing	18	17
(Italy) 2026 Milano Cortina	24	3

=== World Championships ===
Year	Age	Aerials
(United States) 2019 Deer Valley	17	10
(Georgia (country)) 2023 Bakuriani	21	13
(Switzerland) 2025 Engadin	23	6
