= Skiing at the 2026 Winter Olympics =

Skiing at the 2026 Winter Olympics may refer to:

- Alpine skiing at the 2026 Winter Olympics
- Freestyle skiing at the 2026 Winter Olympics
