= Freestyle skiing at the 2026 Winter Olympics – Women's aerials =

Women's aerials at the XXV Olympic Winter Games
- Freestyle skiing
- Venue: Livigno Aerials & Moguls Park, Valtellina
- Date: 18 February 2026
- Competitors: 25 from 11 nations
- Winning points: 112.90

Medalists
1st place, gold medalist(s)		Xu Mengtao	China
2nd place, silver medalist(s)		Danielle Scott	Australia
3rd place, bronze medalist(s)		Shao Qi	China

The women's aerials competition in freestyle skiing at the 2026 Winter Olympics was held on 18 February, at the Livigno Aerials & Moguls Park in Valtellina. Xu Mengtao of China successfully defended her 2022 title. Danielle Scott of Australia won the silver medal, and Shao Qi of China won bronze. Xu also became the first athlete to win an Olympic gold medal in freestyle skiing aerials back-to-back in history.

== Background ==
The defending champion, Xu Mengtao, qualified for the event, as did the 2022 silver medalist and 2018 champion, Hanna Huskova (now competing as Individual Neutral Athlete). The bronze medalist, Megan Nick, retired from competitions. Xu Mengtao was leading the aerials standings of the 2025–26 FIS Freestyle Ski World Cup before the Olympics. Marion Thénault was the 2025 World champion.

== Results ==
=== Qualification ===
The qualification was held at 10:00.

Rank	Bib	Order	Name	Country	Q1	Q2	Best	Notes
1	6	1	Marion Thénault	Canada	108.61	—N/a		Q
2	7	3	Danielle Scott	Australia	99.59	—N/a		Q
3	9	20	Shao Qi	China	90.22	—N/a		Q
4	2	21	Kong Fanyu	China	89.72	—N/a		Q
5	1	12	Xu Mengtao	China	89.29	—N/a		Q
6	3	13	Kaila Kuhn	United States	89.29	—N/a		Q
7	8	24	Chen Meiting	China	86.71	100.29	100.29	Q
8	16	6	Hanna Huskova	Individual Neutral Athletes	88.29	82.73	88.29	Q
9	10	5	Abbey Willcox	Australia	88.12	66.78	88.12	Q
10	4	9	Winter Vinecki	United States	87.57	84.99	87.57	Q
11	13	17	Emma Weiß	Germany	81.90	75.14	81.90	Q
12	12	2	Tasia Tanner	United States	80.01	78.01	80.01	Q
13	15	16	Anhelina Brykina	Ukraine	79.84	75.50	79.84	
14	14	14	Kyra Dossa	United States	53.55	75.98	75.98	
15	26	10	Sidney Stephens	Australia	75.11	73.84	75.11	
16	20	23	Anastasiya Andryianava	Individual Neutral Athletes	74.02	70.39	74.02	
17	19	11	Anna Derugo	Individual Neutral Athletes	58.90	71.63	71.63	
18	17	19	Diana Yablonska	Ukraine	55.44	69.89	69.89	
19	18	25	Nelli Popovych	Ukraine	43.46	64.22	64.22	
20	24	7	Oksana Yatsiuk	Ukraine	62.68	60.03	62.68	
21	25	22	Ayana Zholdas	Kazakhstan	61.11	57.10	61.11	
22	11	8	Airleigh Frigo	Australia	55.75	60.27	60.27	
23	21	4	Lina Kozomara	Switzerland	57.71	58.50	58.50	
24	23	18	Runa Igarashi	Japan	54.60	51.94	54.60	
25	22	15	Adéla Měrková	Czech Republic	50.17	48.62	50.17	

=== Finals ===
The final was held at 13:00.

Rank	Bib	Name	Country	Final 1			Final 2
Rank	Bib	Name	Country	Jump 1	Jump 2	Best	Final 2
1st place, gold medalist(s)	1	Xu Mengtao	China	107.75	DNS	107.75	112.90
2nd place, silver medalist(s)	7	Danielle Scott	Australia	117.19	DNS	117.19	102.17
3rd place, bronze medalist(s)	9	Shao Qi	China	105.93	DNS	105.93	101.90
4	2	Kong Fanyu	China	113.33	DNS	113.33	101.31
5	3	Kaila Kuhn	United States	87.00	109.90	109.90	99.16
6	4	Winter Vinecki	United States	99.89	107.75	107.75	90.58
7	6	Marion Thénault	Canada	103.89	101.90	103.89	—N/a
8	16	Hanna Huskova	Individual Neutral Athletes	86.44	100.29	100.29	—N/a
9	8	Chen Meiting	China	98.73	76.93	98.73	—N/a
10	10	Abbey Willcox	Australia	88.83	74.97	88.83	—N/a
11	12	Tasia Tanner	United States	85.36	80.62	85.36	—N/a
12	13	Emma Weiß	Germany	45.82	75.28	75.28	—N/a
