= Freestyle skiing at the 2025 Asian Winter Games – Women's aerials synchro =

Women's aerials synchro at the 2025 Asian Winter Games
- Venue: Yabuli Ski Resort
- Dates: 11 February 2025
- Competitors: 6 from 2 nations

Medalists
gold medal	Feng Junxi; Wang Xue	China
silver medal	Chen Meiting; Xu Mengtao	China
bronze medal	Ardana Makhanova; Ayana Zholdas	Kazakhstan

The women's aerials synchro at the 2025 Asian Winter Games was held on 11 February 2025 at Yabuli Ski Resort in Harbin, China.

== Schedule ==
All times are China Standard Time (UTC+08:00)

Date	Time	Event
Tuesday, 11 February 2025	11:00	Final

== Results ==
Rank	Team	Jump 1	Jump 2	Best
1st place, gold medalist(s)	China (CHN); Feng Junxi; Wang Xue	87.12	84.67	87.12
2nd place, silver medalist(s)	China (CHN); Chen Meiting; Xu Mengtao	84.86	80.51	84.86
3rd place, bronze medalist(s)	Kazakhstan (KAZ); Ardana Makhanova; Ayana Zholdas	59.16	47.72	59.16
