= Justin Schoenefeld =

American freestyle skier

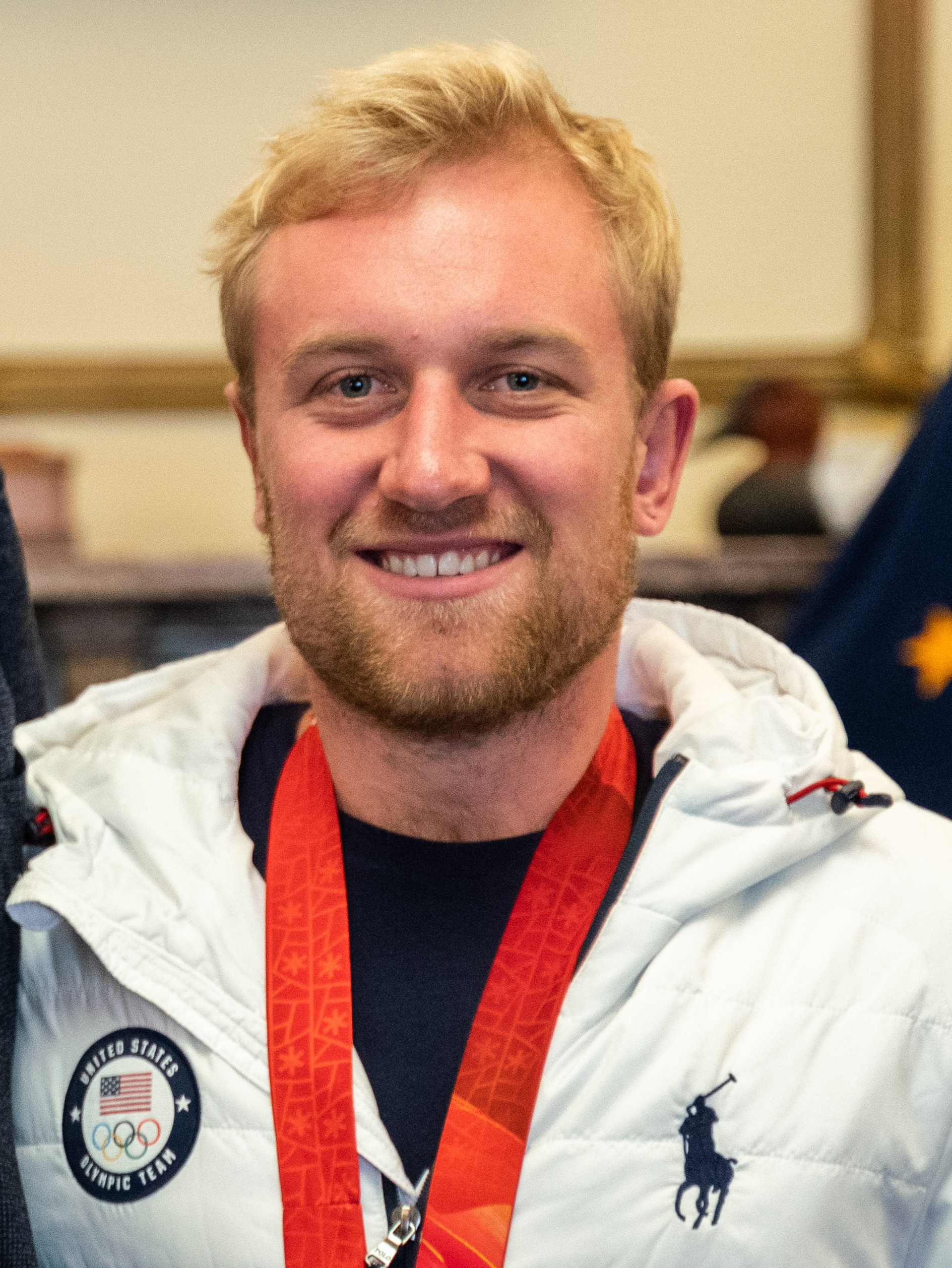
- Schoenefeld in 2022

Personal information
- Nationality: American
- Born: August 13, 1998 (age 27) Lawrenceburg, Indiana

Sport
- Sport: Freestyle skiing
- Event: Aerials
Medal record
Men's freestyle skiing
Representing the United States
Olympic Games
| Gold medal – first place | 2022 Beijing | Mixed team aerials |

Justin Schoenefeld (born August 13, 1998) is an American freestyle skier who specializes in aerials.

== Career ==
Schoenefeld made his debut at the Nor-Am Cup for in Park City, Utah in December 2014, finishing 12th and 10th. During the 2015–16 season, he finished in the top ten five times, placing ninth in the Aerials discipline standings. He got his first victory in this series in Lake Placid. At the 2017 Junior World Championships in Chiesa in Valmalenco, he finished in 15th place. In the 2017–18 season, he won the Aerials discipline standings in the Nor-Am Cup with three wins. He made his World Cup debut in January 2019 in Lake Placid, where he finished in 17th place. Two top tens followed this, and at the end of the season, he finished in tenth place in the Aerials standings. After ninth place at the Deer Valley Resort and 18th place in Moscow in the 2019–20 season, he clinched his first World Cup victory in Minsk. This was followed by fifth place in Almaty and tenth place in the Aerials World Cup standings at the end of the season.

Schoenefeld competed at the men's aerials at the FIS Freestyle Ski and Snowboarding World Championships 2021. He participated in the 2022 Winter Olympics, winning a gold medal in the mixed team aerials event.

== Personal life ==
Schoenefeld starting dating fellow freestyle skier Ashley Caldwell in 2019. They married in the mountains of Park City, Utah, in February 2025 at 8,500 feet. The ceremony was officiated by their friend and teammate Christopher Lillis. On July 16, 2025, Caldwell gave birth to their son Harvey.
