= Li Tianma =

Chinese freestyle skier (born 2001)

Personal information
- Born: 18 October 2001 (age 24) Jiangsu, China

Sport
- Country: China
- Sport: Freestyle skiing
- Event: Aerials
Medal record
Men's freestyle skiing
Representing China
Olympic Games
Bronze medal – third place	2026 Milano Cortina	Aerials
Bronze medal – third place	2026 Milano Cortina	Mixed team aerials
World Championships
Silver medal – second place	2023 Bakuriani	Mixed team aerials

Li Tianma (born 18 October 2001) is a Chinese freestyle skier specializing in aerials. He represented China at the 2026 Winter Olympics and won two bronze medals.

== Career ==
Li represented China at the 2023 FIS Freestyle Ski World Championships and won a silver medal in the mixed team aerials event.

During the 2024–25 FIS Freestyle Ski World Cup, Li earned his first career World Cup victory on 23 February 2025 with a score of 130.56, finishing ahead of 2022 Winter Olympics gold medalist Qi Guangpu. The next day he won the team aerials event, along with Xu Mengtao and Qi.

During the 2025–26 FIS Freestyle Ski World Cup, Li earned his second career World Cup victory on 20 December 2025 with a score of 128.01 points. The next day he won the team aerials event, along with Xu and Qi.

In January 2026, he was selected to represent China at the 2026 Winter Olympics. On 20 February 2026, he won a bronze medal in the aerials event with a score of 123.93. The next day he won a bronze medal in the mixed team aerials event, along with Xu Mengtao and Wang Xindi.
