= Sidney Stephens =

Australian freestyle skier (born 2003)

Personal information
- Nationality: Australian
- Born: 1 February 2003 (age 23) Bedfordview, Gauteng, South Africa

Sport
- Sport: Freestyle skiing
- Event: Aerials
Medal record
Women's artistic gymnastics
Representing Australia
Pacific Rim Championships
Bronze medal – third place	2018 Medellín	Team

Sidney Stephens (born 1 February 2003) is an Australian freestyle skier who competed at the 2026 Winter Olympics, placing placed 15th in the women's aerials event. Stephens switched to freestyle skiing in 2021 and was originally an artistic gymnast, earning a bronze medal in the team event at the 2018 Pacific Rim Championships in Medellín, Colombia.

Stephens was born in Bedfordview, Gauteng, South Africa, and grew up in Margaret River, Western Australia. She attended Churchlands Senior High School. As of 2026, she is studying a bachelor of psychological science.
