= Australia at the 2026 Winter Olympics =

- Flag of Australia
- IOC code: AUS
- NOC: Australian Olympic Committee
- Website: www.olympics.com.au

in Milan and Cortina d'Ampezzo, Italy 6 February 2026 – 22 February 2026
- Competitors: 51 (20 men and 31 women) in 11 sports
- Flag bearers (opening): Matt Graham & Jakara Anthony
- Flag bearers (closing): Cooper Woods & Danielle Scott
- Medals Ranked 14th: Gold 3 Silver 2 Bronze 1 Total 6

Winter Olympics appearances (overview)
- 1936; 1948; 1952; 1956; 1960; 1964; 1968; 1972; 1976; 1980; 1984; 1988; 1992; 1994; 1998; 2002; 2006; 2010; 2014; 2018; 2022; 2026

Australia competed at the 2026 Winter Olympics in Milan and Cortina d'Ampezzo, Italy, which was held from 6 to 22 February 2026. Australia surpassed their previous best performance at Vancouver 2010, with 3 golds, 2 silvers and 1 bronze. Additionally, with 6 total medals, Australia broke their prior record of total medals won at a Winter Olympics games.

Freestyle skiers Matt Graham and Jakara Anthony were the country's flagbearer during the opening ceremony. Meanwhile, fellow freestyle skiers Cooper Woods and Danielle Scott were the country's flagbearer during the closing ceremony.

== Administration ==
Alisa Camplin was appointed Chef de Mission.

== Medallists ==
The following Australian competitors won medals at the games. In the discipline sections below, the medallists' names are bolded.

Medal	Name	Sport	Event	Date
Gold	Cooper Woods-Topalovic	Freestyle skiing	Men's moguls	12 February
Gold	Josie Baff	Snowboarding	Women's snowboard cross	13 February
Gold	Jakara Anthony	Freestyle skiing	Women's dual moguls	14 February
Silver	Scotty James	Snowboarding	Men's halfpipe	13 February
Silver	Danielle Scott	Freestyle skiing	Women's aerials	18 February
Bronze	Matt Graham	Freestyle skiing	Men's dual moguls	15 February

Medals by sport
Sport	1st place, gold medalist(s)	2nd place, silver medalist(s)	3rd place, bronze medalist(s)	Total
Freestyle skiing	2	1	1	**4**
Snowboarding	1	1	0	**2**
Total	3	2	1	6

Medals by date
Day	Date	1st place, gold medalist(s)	2nd place, silver medalist(s)	3rd place, bronze medalist(s)	Total
6	12 February	1	0	0	**1**
7	13 February	1	1	0	**2**
8	14 February	1	0	0	**1**
9	15 February	0	0	1	**1**
12	18 February	0	1	0	**1**
Total		3	2	1	6

Medals by gender
Gender	1st place, gold medalist(s)	2nd place, silver medalist(s)	3rd place, bronze medalist(s)	Total
Male	1	1	1	**3**
Female	2	1	0	**3**
Mixed	0	0	0	**0**
Total	3	2	1	6

== Competitors ==
The following is the list of number of competitors participating at the Games per sport/discipline. This includes quotas from host country allocations.

Sport	Men	Women	Total
Alpine skiing	1	2	3
Biathlon	0	1	1
Bobsleigh	0	4	4
Cross-country skiing	3	4	7
Figure skating	2	2	4
Freestyle skiing	5	9	14
Luge	1	0	1
Short-track speed skating	1	0	1
Skeleton	1	0	1
Ski mountaineering	1	1	2
Snowboarding	5	8	13
Total	20	31	51

The following athletes were selected but withdrew due to injuries prior to their event - Cam Bolton (snowboarding: snowboard cross), Laura Peel (freestyle skiing: aerials), Daisy Thomas (freestyle skiing: slopestyle, big air) and Misaki Vaughan (snowboarding: halfpipe). Sidney Stephens replaced Laura Peel from the selected team.

== Alpine skiing ==
Australia qualified two female and one male alpine skier via the basic quota.

Athlete	Event	Run 1		Run 2		Total	
Athlete	Event	Time	Rank	Time	Rank	Time	Rank
Harry Laidlaw	Giant slalom	1:18.52	28	1:13.38	29	2:31.90	29
Phoebe Heaydon	Giant slalom	1:07.33	39	1:13.85	33	2:21.18	34
Phoebe Heaydon	Slalom	DNF					
Madison Hoffman	Slalom	49.88	26	53.15	21	1:43.03	23

== Biathlon ==
Australia qualified one female biathlete, Darcie Morton, via the IBU Qualifying Points List. As the country did not rank in the top 20 of the Nations Cup standings, it secured one of the 12 individual quota spots available to nations attempting to qualify through individual athlete rankings.

Women

Athlete	Event	Time	Misses	Rank
Darcie Morton	Sprint	25:09.8	3 (1+2)	87
Darcie Morton	Individual	55:28.3	9 (3+3+2+1)	90

== Bobsleigh ==
Australia qualified a team of four female bobsledders, securing two quota spots in the two-woman event and one in the women's monobob based on the IBSF Combined Ranking List for the 2025–26 season.

Athletes	Event	Run 1		Run 2		Run 3		Run 4		Total	
Athletes	Event	Time	Rank	Time	Rank	Time	Rank	Time	Rank	Time	Rank
Bree Walker	Monobob	1:00.19	11	1:00.01	7	59.60	7	59.69	8	3:59.49	8
Kiara Reddingius; Bree Walker	Two-woman	57.45	11	57.60	7	57.96	9	57.81	10	3:50.82	10
Sarah Blizzard; Desi Johnson	Two-woman	58.07	22	57.91	16	58.42	18	Did not advance		2:54.40	21

== Cross-country skiing ==
Australia qualified one female and one male cross-country skier through the basic quota. Following the completion of the 2024–25 FIS Cross-Country World Cup, Australia qualified a further three female and two male athletes.

Distance
Men

Athlete	Event	Classical		Freestyle		Total	
Athlete	Event	Time	Rank	Time	Rank	Time	Rank
Seve de Campo	Men's 10 km freestyle	—N/a		23:30.3	61	—N/a	
Seve de Campo	Men's skiathlon	27:11.6	59	26:12.5	56	53:24.1	57
Seve de Campo	Men's 50 km classical	2:29:22.8	41	—N/a			
Hugo Hinckfuss	Men's 10 km freestyle	—N/a		23:43.4	66	—N/a	
Hugo Hinckfuss	Men's skiathlon	27:20.0	57	26:01.6	56	53:21.6	56
Lars Young Vik	Men's 10 km freestyle	—N/a		24:19.3	70	—N/a	

Women

Athlete	Event	Classical		Freestyle		Total	
Athlete	Event	Time	Rank	Time	Rank	Time	Rank
Phoebe Cridland	Women's 10 km freestyle	—N/a		26:05.5	49	—N/a	
Phoebe Cridland	Women's skiathlon	33:39.0	58	LAP			
Rosie Fordham	Women's 10 km freestyle	—N/a		25:17.8	33	—N/a	
Rosie Fordham	Women's skiathlon	33:00.8	56	28:46.2	30	1:02:17.8	49
Rosie Fordham	Women's 50 km classical	2:38:30.6	29	—N/a			
Maddie Hooker	Women's 10 km freestyle	—N/a		28:07.0	77	—N/a	
Maddie Hooker	Women's skiathlon	33:58.1	60	LAP			
Ellen Søhol Lie	Women's 10 km freestyle	—N/a		26:21.7	57	—N/a	
Ellen Søhol Lie	Women's skiathlon	26:21.7	57	LAP			
Ellen Søhol Lie; Phoebe Cridland; Rosie Fordham; Maddie Hooker	4 × 7.5 km relay	—N/a				1:25:06.1	14

Sprint

Athlete	Event	Qualification		Quarterfinal		Semifinal		Final	
Athlete	Event	Time	Rank	Time	Rank	Time	Rank	Time	Rank
Hugo Hinckfuss	Men's sprint	3:23.41	42	Did not advance					
Lars Young Vik	Men's sprint	3:26.13	51	Did not advance					
Lars Young Vik; Hugo Hinckfuss	Men's team sprint	5:53.68	9 Q	—N/a				18:39.37	14
Ellen Søhol Lie	Women's sprint	4:01.65	50	Did not advance					
Maddie Hooker	Women's sprint	4:13.09	67	Did not advance					
Phoebe Cridland; Rosie Fordham	Women's team sprint	7:18.56	18	—N/a				Did not advance	

== Figure skating ==
Australia secured one quota in pair skating at the 2025 World Figure Skating Championships in Boston. One quota for ice dance was then secured at the ISU Skate to Milano Figure Skating Qualifier 2025 competition in Beijing.

Athlete	Event	SP/SD		FP/FD		Total	
Athlete	Event	Points	Rank	Points	Rank	Points	Rank
Anastasia Golubeva; Hektor Giotopoulos Moore	Pairs	60.69	18	Did not advance			18
Holly Harris; Jason Chan	Ice dance	67.75	18 Q	108.64	17	176.39	18

== Freestyle skiing ==
Australia qualified a team of 15 freestyle skiers, securing quota spots in aerials, moguls, ski cross, and freeskiing based on the FIS Olympic Qualification List.

=== Aerials ===
Athlete	Event	Qualification				Finals					
Athlete	Event	Jump 1		Jump 2		Final 1				Final 2	
Athlete	Event	Points	Rank	Points	Rank	Jump 1	Jump 2	Best	Rank	Points	Rank
Reilly Flanagan	Men's aerials	74.02	21	87.57	11	Did not advance					
Airleigh Frigo	Women's aerials	55.75	20	60.27	14	Did not advance					
Danielle Scott	Women's aerials	99.59	2 Q	—N/a		117.19	DNS	117.19	1 Q	102.17	2nd place, silver medalist(s)
Sidney Stephens	Women's aerials	75.11	14	73.84	8	Did not advance					
Abbey Willcox	Women's aerials	88.12	8	66.78	3 Q	88.12	74.97	88.83	10	Did not advance	
Abbey Willcox; Reilly Flanagan; Danielle Scott	Mixed team	—N/a						289.04	3 Q	256.04	4

=== Freeskiing ===
Athlete	Event	Qualification					Final				
Athlete	Event	Run 1	Run 2	Run 3	Best	Rank	Run 1	Run 2	Run 3	Best	Rank
Indra Brown	Women's halfpipe	80.75	87.50	—N/a	87.50	4 Q	55.50	65.00	87.00	87.00	5

=== Moguls ===
Athlete	Event	Qualification								Final							
Athlete	Event	Run 1				Run 2				Run 1				Run 2			Rank
Athlete	Event	Time	Points	Total	Rank	Time	Points	Total	Rank	Time	Points	Total	Rank	Time	Points	Total	Rank
Jackson Harvey	Men's moguls	23.55	52.96	69.26	23	23.17	60.53	77.35	15 Q	22.90	62.74	79.92	8 Q	23.38	58.40	74.93	8
Matt Graham	Men's moguls	22.89	58.58	75.77	10 Q	Bye				22.59	63.96	81.56	3 Q	21.84	62.27	80.88	5
George Murphy	Men's moguls	24.22	51.79	67.19	26	26.32	39.05	51.63	29	Did not advance							
Cooper Woods-Topalovic	Men's moguls	23.48	57.27	73.67	15	23.28	63.79	80.46	1 Q	22.70	66.15	83.60	1 Q	22.61	66.14	83.71	1st place, gold medalist(s)
Jakara Anthony	Women's moguls	25.59	63.74	81.65	1 Q	Bye				24.71	65.01	83.96	1 Q	26.69	44.19	60.81	8
Emma Bosco	Women's moguls	28.02	51.53	66.58	17	27.82	47.19	62.48	11	Did not advance							
Charlotte Wilson	Women's moguls	28.78	35.79	49.95	28	26.60	61.07	77.79	1 Q	25.93	60.87	78.38	5 Q	26.26	58.05	75.17	6

=== Dual moguls ===
Men

Athlete	Event	Round of 32	Round of 16	Quarterfinals	Semifinals	Finals	
Athlete	Event	Opposition Result	Opposition Result	Opposition Result	Opposition Result	Opposition Result	Rank
Jackson Harvey	Dual moguls	Fujiki (JPN); W 19-16	Wallberg (SWE); L 8-27	Did not advance			
Matt Graham	Dual moguls	Nishizawa (JPN); W 22-13	Stegfeldt (SWE); W 27-9	Mickle (USA); W 20-15	Horishima (JPN); L FB 14-21	Shimakawa (JPN); W 20-15	3rd place, bronze medalist(s)
George Murphy	Dual moguls	Cavet (FRA); W 23-12	Walczyk (USA); L 35-DNF	Did not advance			
Cooper Woods-Topalovic	Dual moguls	Bye	Mickle (USA); L 3-32	Did not advance			

Women

Athlete	Event	Round of 32	Round of 16	Quarterfinals	Semifinals	Finals	
Athlete	Event	Opposition Result	Opposition Result	Opposition Result	Opposition Result	Opposition Result	Rank
Jakara Anthony	Dual moguls	Malherbe (RSA); W 35-DNF	Linton (CAN); W 27-8	Giaccio (USA); W 20-15	Lemley (USA); W FA 35-DNF	Kauf (USA); W 20-15	1st place, gold medalist(s)
Emma Bosco	Dual moguls	Wilson (AUS); W 29-6	Kauf (USA); L 6-29	Did not advance			
Charlotte Wilson	Dual moguls	Bosco (AUS); L 6-29	Did not advance				

=== Ski cross ===
Athlete	Event	Seeding		Round of 16	Quarterfinal	Semifinal	Final	
Athlete	Event	Time	Rank	Position	Position	Position	Position	Rank
Kyra Wheatley	Women's ski cross	1:16.25	23	4	Did not advance			

== Luge ==
Australia qualified one sled in the men's singles event, with three-time Olympian Alex Ferlazzo securing the quota spot based on the 2025–26 FIL World Cup standings.

Athlete	Event	Run 1		Run 2		Run 3		Run 4		Total	
Athlete	Event	Time	Rank	Time	Rank	Time	Rank	Time	Rank	Time	Rank
Alexander Ferlazzo	Men's singles	54.013	20	53.999	18	53.800	17	53.734	16	3:35.546	18

== Short-track speed skating ==
Australia qualified two short-track speed skaters (one per gender) after the conclusion of the 2025–26 ISU Short Track World Tour. They declined their female quota.

Athlete	Event	Heat		Quarterfinal		Semifinal		Final	
Athlete	Event	Time	Rank	Time	Rank	Time	Rank	Time	Rank
Brendan Corey	Men's 500 m	41.845	4	Did not advance					
Brendan Corey	Men's 1000 m	1:26.052	4	Did not advance					
Brendan Corey	Men's 1500 m	—N/a		2:12.741	3 Q	2:16.575	5	Did not advance	

== Skeleton ==
Australia qualified a single male skeleton racer, securing one quota spot based on the IBSF Ranking List for the 2025–26 season.

Athlete	Event	Run 1		Run 2		Run 3		Run 4		Total	
Athlete	Event	Time	Rank	Time	Rank	Time	Rank	Time	Rank	Time	Rank
Nick Timmings	Men's	58.26	24	57.57	20	57.18	19	57.21	20	3:50.22	21

== Ski mountaineering ==
Australia qualified one female and one male ski mountaineer through the 2025 ISMF World Championships.

Athlete	Event	Heat		Semifinal		Final	
Athlete	Event	Time	Rank	Time	Rank	Time	Rank
Phillip Bellingham	Men's sprint	2:48.39	5LL	3:13.53	6	Did not advance	
Lara Hamilton	Women's sprint	3:39.25	6	Did not advance			
Phillip Bellingham; Lara Hamilton	Mixed relay	—N/a				32:33.45	12

== Snowboarding ==
Australia qualified a team of 14 snowboarders (5 men and 9 women), securing quota spots in halfpipe, slopestyle/big air, and snowboard cross based on the FIS Olympic Quota Allocation List.

=== Freestyle ===
Men

Athlete	Event	Qualification					Final				
Athlete	Event	Run 1	Run 2	Run 3	Best	Rank	Run 1	Run 2	Run 3	Best	Rank
Valentino Guseli	Big Air	73.25	71.50	91.50	163.00	12 Q	23.00	86.75	16.50	109.75	10
Valentino Guseli	Halfpipe	86.75	DNI	—N/a	86.75	6 Q	35.00	DNI	88.00	88.00	5
Scotty James	Halfpipe	94.00	DNI	—N/a	94.00	1 Q	48.75	93.50	DNI	93.50	2nd place, silver medalist(s)

Women

Athlete	Event	Qualification					Final				
Athlete	Event	Run 1	Run 2	Run 3	Best	Rank	Run 1	Run 2	Run 3	Best	Rank
Emily Arthur	Halfpipe	5.75	7.25	—N/a	7.25	24	Did not advance				
Tess Coady	Big air	78.50	55.00	75.00	153.50	12 Q	70.00	61.00	DNI	131.00	7
Tess Coady	Slopestyle	38.95	30.18	—N/a	38.95	27	Did not advance				
Amelie Haskell	Halfpipe	41.75	DNI	—N/a	41.75	20	Did not advance				
Ally Hickman	Big air	85.25	61.75	64.25	149.50	15	Did not advance				
Ally Hickman	Slopestyle	71.41	31.96	—N/a	71.41	6 Q	67.70	4.26	48.68	67.70	7
Meila Stalker	Big air	19.25	82.25	82.75	165.00	6 Q	72.50	35.00	DNI	107.50	10
Meila Stalker	Slopestyle	47.36	47.11	—N/a	47.36	22	Did not advance				

=== Snowboard cross ===
Athlete	Event	Seeding		1/8 final	Quarterfinal	Semifinal	Final	
Athlete	Event	Time	Rank	Position	Position	Position	Position	Rank
Jarryd Hughes	Men's	1:09.36	25	3	Did not advance			
Adam Lambert	Men's	1:08.64	21	4	Did not advance			
James Johnstone	Men's	1:11.07	30	3	Did not advance			
Josie Baff	Women's	1:15.62	17	1 Q	2 Q	1 FA	1	1st place, gold medalist(s)
Mia Clift	Women's	1:14.43	11	2 Q	3	Did not advance		
Abbey Wilson	Women's	1:15.03	24	3	Did not advance			
Jarryd Hughes; Mia Clift	Mixed team	—N/a			2 Q	3	4	8
Adam Lambert; Josie Baff	Mixed team	—N/a			1 Q	2 Q	4	4

== See also ==
- Australia at the 2026 Winter Paralympics
