= Ashley Caldwell =

American freestyle skier

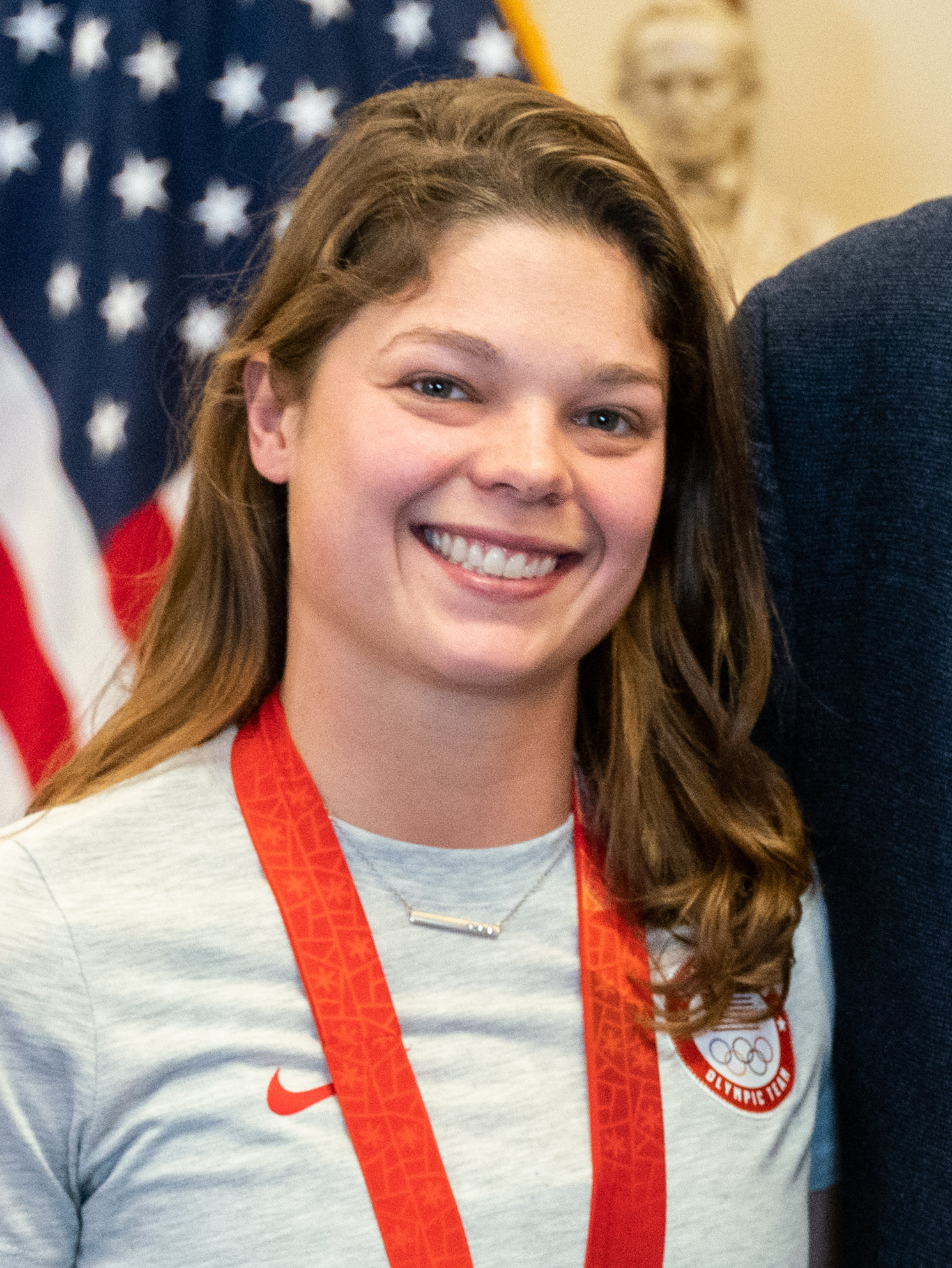
- Caldwell in 2022

Personal information
- Born: September 14, 1993 (age 33) Ashburn, Virginia, United States
- Height: 5 ft 7 in (170 cm)

Sport
- Sport: Skiing
- Club: U.S. Ski and Snowboard Association

World Cup career
- Seasons: 8
- Indiv. podiums: 11
- Indiv. wins: 6
Medal record
Women's freestyle skiing
Representing the United States
Olympic Games
Gold medal – first place	2022 Beijing	Mixed team aerials
World Championships
Gold medal – first place	2017 Sierra Nevada	Aerials
Gold medal – first place	2023 Bakuriani	Mixed team aerials
Silver medal – second place	2021 Almaty	Aerials
Bronze medal – third place	2021 Almaty	Mixed team aerials
- Updated on March 10, 2021

Ashley Caldwell (born September 14, 1993) is an American freestyle skier who has competed in aerials since 2008. Caldwell was named to the US team for the 2010 Winter Olympics in January 2010 after competing in the sport for only two seasons. The youngest in the event, she reached the finals of the Aerials. Caldwell won her first World Cup aerials event in the United States in Lake Placid, New York, in January 2011, becoming the youngest female skier ever to win.

Caldwell then suffered back-to-back ACL tears, missing the 2012 and 2013 competitive seasons. Upon returning, she claimed the silver medal at her first world cup event in China, earning a spot to the 2014 Winter Olympics in Sochi, Russia. She placed 10th place after a bad landing on her first finals jump. She competed again at the World Cup in Beijing in December 2014, winning gold, alongside her 19-year-old teammate Kiley McKinnon, who won silver. She became the first female skier to land a quadruple twisting triple back flip at the 2017 World Championship in Sierra Nevada, Spain. Caldwell won the aerials event alongside teammate Jonathon Lillis.

At the 2022 Beijing Winter Olympics, as part of Team USA, she won a gold medal in the mixed team aerials with a combined final team score of 338.34.

== Personal life ==
Caldwell is the oldest of four children. She grew up in Northern Virginia, competing in gymnastics and other various sports as a child. She trained at Apex Gymnastics in Leesburg, Virginia. Originally living in Ashburn, Virginia, and moving to western Loudoun County, Virginia, she went to Blue Ridge Middle School. Her family now resides in Houston, Texas, and she lived in Hamilton, Virginia, and then in Park City, Utah, beginning around 2013.

Caldwell starting dating fellow freestyle skier Justin Schoenefeld in 2019. They married in the mountains of Park City, Utah in February 2025 at 8,500 feet. The ceremony was officiated by their friend and teammate Christopher Lillis. On July 16, 2025 Caldwell gave birth to their son Harvey.
