= FIS Freestyle Ski and Snowboarding World Championships 2023 – Mixed team aerials =

Mixed team aerials at the FIS Freestyle Ski and Snowboarding World Championships 2023
- Location: Bakuriani, Georgia
- Dates: 19 February
- Competitors: 15 from 5 nations
- Teams: 5
- Winning points: 331.37

Medalists
gold medal	Ashley Caldwell; Christopher Lillis; Quinn Dehlinger	United States
silver medal	Kong Fanyu; Li Tianma; Yang Longxiao	China
bronze medal	Anastasiya Novosad; Oleksandr Okipniuk; Dmytro Kotovskyi	Ukraine

The Mixed team aerials competition at the FIS Freestyle Ski and Snowboarding World Championships 2023 was held on 19 February 2023.

== Results ==
The first run was started at 14:30 and the second run at 15:05.

Rank	Bib	Country	Final 1	Final 2
1st place, gold medalist(s)	3	United States; Ashley Caldwell; Christopher Lillis; Quinn Dehlinger	303.47; 82.21; 118.55; 102.71	331.37; 92.00; 127.15; 112.22
2nd place, silver medalist(s)	1	China; Kong Fanyu; Li Tianma; Yang Longxiao	290.80; 60.48; 115.84; 114.48	320.71; 83.16; 113.57; 123.98
3rd place, bronze medalist(s)	2	Ukraine; Anastasiya Novosad; Oleksandr Okipniuk; Dmytro Kotovskyi	239.69; 76.86; 77.43; 85.40	255.56; 87.42; 84.51; 83.63
4	6	Kazakhstan; Zhanbota Aldabergenova; Roman Ivanov; Sherzod Khashyrbayev	266.98; 85.05; 97.29; 84.64	236.33; 65.20; 88.83; 82.30
5	4	Canada; Marion Thénault; Miha Fontaine; Alexandre Duchaine	228.17; 76.23; 83.50; 68.44	Did not advance
—	5	Switzerland; Alexandra Bär; Pirmin Werner; Noé Roth	Did not start	
