= Freestyle skiing at the 2022 Winter Olympics – Mixed team aerials =

Mixed team aerials at the XXIV Olympic Winter Games
- Freestyle skiing
- Venue: Genting Snow Park, Zhangjiakou
- Date: 10 February 2022
- Competitors: 18 from 6 nations
- Teams: 6
- Winning points: 338.34

Medalists
1st place, gold medalist(s)		Ashley Caldwell; Christopher Lillis; Justin Schoenefeld	United States
2nd place, silver medalist(s)		Xu Mengtao; Jia Zongyang; Qi Guangpu	China
3rd place, bronze medalist(s)		Marion Thénault; Miha Fontaine; Lewis Irving	Canada

The mixed team aerials competition in freestyle skiing at the 2022 Winter Olympics was held on 10 February at the Genting Snow Park in Zhangjiakou. This was the first time a mixed team short freestyle skiing event was featured at the Olympics. The United States team, represented by Ashley Caldwell, Christopher Lillis and Justin Schoenefeld, won the event. Hosts China, with Xu Mengtao, Jia Zongyang and Qi Guangpu, won the silver medals and Canada, with Marion Thénault, Miha Fontaine and Lewis Irving, became the bronze medalists.

At the 2021–22 FIS Freestyle Ski World Cup, only two mixed team events were held before the Olympics. Both were won by China, with Russia and the United States ranked one time second and Ukraine two times third. Russia were the 2021 world champions, and Switzerland and the United States were the silver and the bronze medalists, respectively.

== Qualification ==
A total of up to 8 teams qualified to compete. Every country with at least three athletes qualified (with at least one man and one woman) can enter.

== Results ==
Rank	Bib	Country	Final 1	Final 2
1st place, gold medalist(s)	2; 2–1; 2–2; 2–3	United States; Ashley Caldwell; Christopher Lillis; Justin Schoenefeld	330.55; 104.31; 101.81; 124.43	338.34; 88.86; 135.00; 114.48
2nd place, silver medalist(s)	1; 1–1; 1–2; 1–3	China; Xu Mengtao; Jia Zongyang; Qi Guangpu	336.89; 94.01; 124.78; 118.10	324.22; 106.03; 96.02; 122.17
3rd place, bronze medalist(s)	5; 5–1; 5–2; 5–3	Canada; Marion Thénault; Miha Fontaine; Lewis Irving	326.94; 93.06; 113.97; 119.91	290.98; 62.74; 116.48; 111.76
4	3; 3–1; 3–2; 3–3	Switzerland; Alexandra Bär; Pirmin Werner; Noé Roth	300.62; 65.83; 128.00; 106.79	276.01; 57.01; 109.00; 110.00
5	4; 4–1; 4–2; 4–3	ROC; Liubov Nikitina; Ilya Burov; Stanislav Nikitin	295.97; 79.66; 97.28; 119.03	—N/a
6	6; 6–1; 6–2; 6–3	Belarus; Hanna Huskova; Stanislau Hladchenko; Maxim Gustik	273.67; 84.73; 89.82; 99.12	—N/a
