= Connor Curran =

American freestyle skier (born 2004)

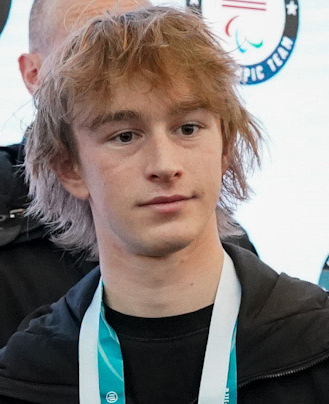
- Curran in 2026

Personal information
- Born: September 23, 2004 (age 21) Cincinnati, Ohio, U.S.

Sport
- Country: United States
- Sport: Freestyle skiing
- Event: Aerials
Medal record
Men's freestyle skiing
Representing the United States
Olympic Games
Gold medal – first place	2026 Milano Cortina	Mixed team aerials
Junior World Championships
Gold medal – first place	2022 Chiesa in Valmalenco	Mixed team aerials
Silver medal – second place	2023 Obertauern	Mixed team aerials
Bronze medal – third place	2023 Obertauern	Aerials
Bronze medal – third place	2024 Chiesa in Valmalenco	Aerials

Connor Curran (born September 23, 2004) is an American freestyle skier specializing in aerials. He represented the United States at the 2026 Winter Olympics, winning a gold medal in mixed team aerials.

== Career ==
Curran made his FIS Freestyle Junior World Ski Championships debut in 2022 and won a gold medal in the mixed team aerials event, along with Kaila Kuhn and Quinn Dehlinger. He competed at the 2023 Junior World Championships and won a silver medal in the mixed team aerials and a bronze medal in the aerials event. He again won a bronze medal in aerials at the 2024 Junior World Championships.

During the 2023–24 FIS Freestyle Ski World Cup, Curran earned his first career World Cup podium on February 2, 2024, finishing in second place. During the 2025–26 FIS Freestyle Ski World Cup, he earned his first career podium in team aerials on December 21, 2025, finishing in third place.

In January 2026, he was selected to represent the United States at the 2026 Winter Olympics. At 21 years old, he was the youngest aerialist at the Olympics. On February 20, 2026, he competed in the aerials event, and finished in 12th place. On February 21, 2026, he won a gold medal in the mixed team aerials, along with Kaila Kuhn and Christopher Lillis.
