= Danielle Scott (freestyle skier) =

Australian freestyle skier (born 1990)

Personal information
- Born: 7 March 1990 (age 36) Sydney, New South Wales, Australia
- Height: 1.67 m (5 ft 6 in) (2025)
- Weight: 57 kg (126 lb) (2025)

Sport
- Country: Australia
- Sport: Freestyle skiing
- Event: Aerials

World Cup career
- Seasons: 13 – (2011–2026)
- Indiv. podiums: 27
- Indiv. wins: 9
- Discipline titles: 2 – 2023, 2024
Medal record
Women's freestyle skiing
Representing Australia
Olympic Games
Silver medal – second place	2026 Milano Cortina	Aerials
World Championships
Silver medal – second place	2017 Sierra Nevada	Aerials
Silver medal – second place	2023 Bakuriani	Aerials
Bronze medal – third place	2013 Voss	Aerials
Bronze medal – third place	2025 Engadin	Aerials

Danielle Scott (born 7 March 1990) is an Australian freestyle skier specialising in Aerial Skiing. Scott represented Australia at the 2014, 2018 and 2022 Olympic Winter Games. She won a silver medal at the 2023 FIS Freestyle World Ski Championships, a silver medal at the 2017 FIS World Ski Championships and a bronze medal at the 2013 FIS Freestyle World Ski Championships. Scott was offered a scholarship for Artistic Gymnastics at the age of 7 at the Australian Institute of Sport, being the youngest athlete to be offered a scholarship at the Australian Institute of Sport.

== Results ==
=== Olympic Winter Games ===
As of 18 February 2026

Year	Age	Aerials
(Russia) 2014 Sochi	23	9
(South Korea) 2018 Pyeongchang	27	12
(China) 2022 Beijing	31	10
(Italy) 2026 Milano Cortina	35	2

=== World Championships results ===
- 3 medals – (2 silver, 1 bronze)

Year	Age	Aerials	Mixed Team Aerials
(Norway) 2013 Voss	22	3	–
(Austria) 2015 Kreischberg	24	5	–
(Spain) 2017 Sierra Nevada	26	2	–
(Kazakhstan) 2021 Almaty	30	4	–
(Georgia (country)) 2023 Bakuriani	32	2	–
(Switzerland) 2025 Engadin	34	3	4

=== World Cup results ===
All results are sourced from the International Ski Federation (FIS).

Season	Age	Overall	Aerials
2012	21	33	11
2013	22	25	8
2014	23	18	6
2015	24	12	3
2016	25	10	2
2017	26	6	2
2018	27	37	6
2021	30	-	14
2022	31	-	4
2023	32	-	1
2024	33	-	1

=== World Cup podiums ===
- 8 wins – (8 AE)
- 21 podiums – (21 AE)

No.	Season	Date	Location	Discipline	Place
1	2013–14	18 January 2014	Lake Placid, United States	Aerials	2nd
2	2014–15	20 December 2014	Beijing, China	Aerials	2nd
3	2014–15	21 February 2015	Moscow, Russia	Aerials	1st
4	2015–16	5 February 2016	Deer Valley, United States	Aerials	2nd
5	2015–16	20 February 2016	Minsk, Belarus	Aerials	2nd
6	2016–17	17 December 2016	Beida Lake, China	Aerials	2nd
7	2016–17	18 December 2016	Beida Lake, China	Aerials	1st
8	2016–17	14 January 2017	Lake Placid, United States	Aerials	2nd
9	2016–17	25 February 2017	Minsk, Belarus	Aerials	2nd
10	2017–18	17 December 2017	Secret Garden, China	Aerials	1st
11	2020–21	6 February 2021	Deer Valley, United States	Aerials	1st
12	2021–22	11 December 2021	Ruka, Finland	Aerials	1st
13	2022–23	4 December 2022	Ruka, Finland	Aerials	1st
14	2022–23	3 February 2023	Deer Valley, United States	Aerials	1st
15	2022–23	5 March 2023	Engadin, Switzerland	Aerials	1st
16	2022–23	19 March 2023	Almaty, Kazakhstan	Aerials	2nd
17	2023–24	3 December 2023	Ruka, Finland	Aerials	2nd
18	2023–24	2 February 2024	Deer Valley, United States	Aerials	2nd
19	2023–24	10 February 2024	Lac-Beauport, Canada	Aerials	2nd
20	2023–24	11 February 2024	Lac-Beauport, Canada	Aerials	3rd
21	2023–24	10 March 2024	Almaty, Kazakhstan	Aerials	2nd
