= Xu Mengtao =

Chinese freestyle skier (born 1990)

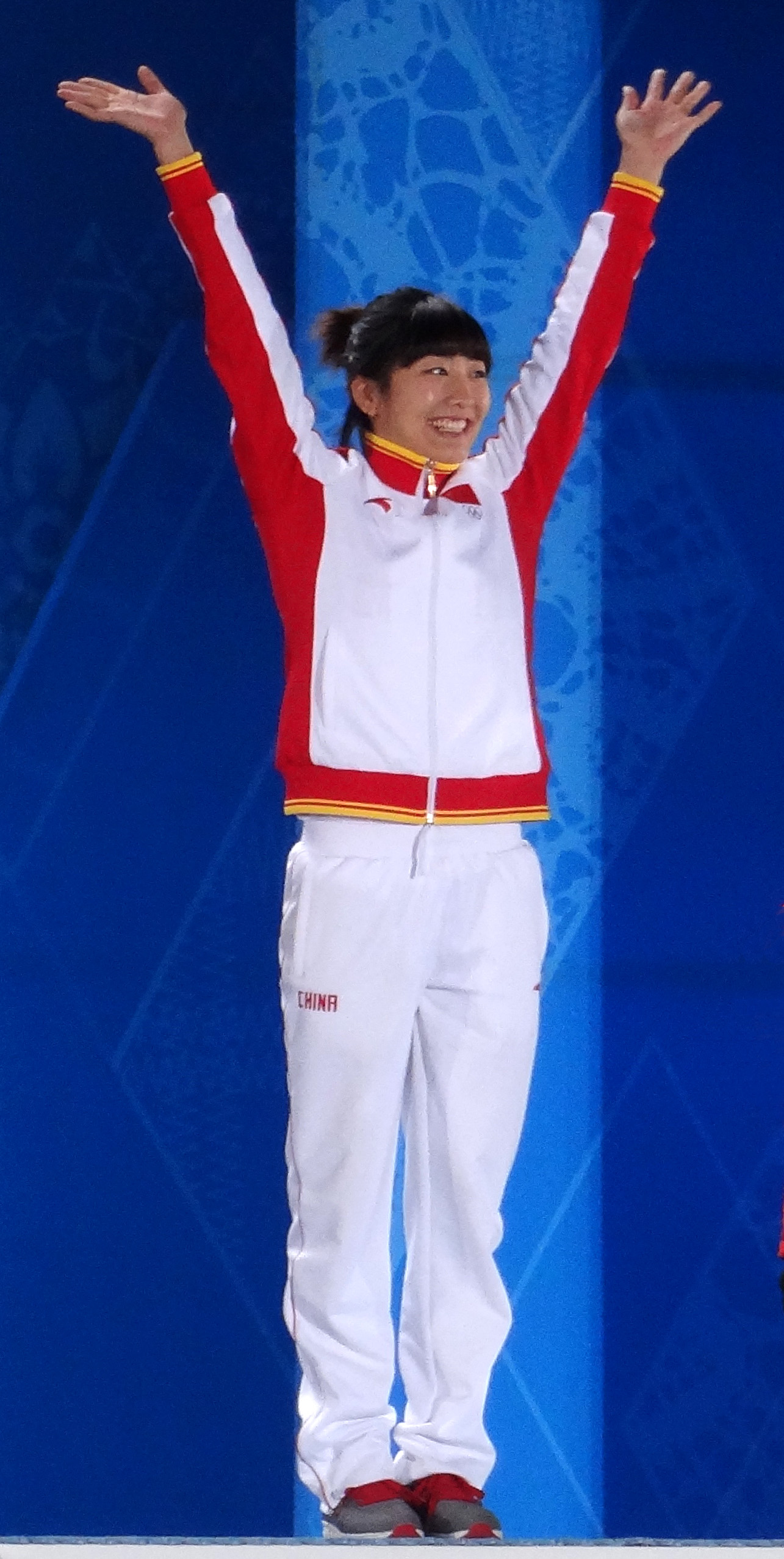
- Xu in 2014

Personal information
- Nationality: Chinese
- Born: 12 July 1990 (age 36) Anshan, Liaoning, China
- Education: Beijing Sport University
- Height: 1.65 m (5 ft 5 in)
- Weight: 59 kg (130 lb)
- Spouse: Wang Xindi

Sport
- Country: China
- Sport: Freestyle skiing
- Event: Aerials
Medal record
Women's freestyle skiing
Representing China
Olympic Games
Gold medal – first place	2022 Beijing	Aerials
Gold medal – first place	2026 Milano-Cortina	Aerials
Silver medal – second place	2014 Sochi	Aerials
Silver medal – second place	2022 Beijing	Mixed team aerials
Bronze medal – third place	2026 Milano Cortina	Mixed team aerials
World Championships
Gold medal – first place	2013 Voss	Aerials
Silver medal – second place	2009 Inawashiro	Aerials
Silver medal – second place	2011 Deer Valley	Aerials
Silver medal – second place	2019 Utah	Mixed team aerials
Silver medal – second place	2025 Engadin	Aerials
Bronze medal – third place	2015 Kreischberg	Aerials
Bronze medal – third place	2017 Sierra Nevada	Aerials
Bronze medal – third place	2019 Utah	Aerials
Asian Winter Games
Gold medal – first place	2025 Harbin	Aerials
Gold medal – first place	2025 Harbin	Mixed team aerials
Silver medal – second place	2025 Harbin	Synchro aerials

Xu Mengtao
- Simplified Chinese: 徐梦桃
- Traditional Chinese: 徐夢桃
Transcriptions
Standard Mandarin
- Hanyu Pinyin: Xú Mèngtáo
- IPA: [ɕy̌ mə̂ŋ tʰǎʊ]

Xu Mengtao (Chinese: 徐梦桃; pinyin: Xú Mèngtáo; Mandarin pronunciation: [ɕy̌ mə̂ŋ tʰǎʊ]; born 12 July 1990) is a Chinese Olympic Champion aerial skier. She has achieved 27 World Cup victories and two Olympic Gold medals. She is also the current World Cup leader and became the first Chinese woman to win an Olympic gold in the Aerial Ski event during her fourth Olympics at the age of 31. She was one of Team China's flag bearers at the 2022 Beijing Winter Olympic's closing ceremony.

== Career Results ==
=== Olympic Games ===
She competed at the 2010 Winter Olympics, where she qualified eighth, and had the highest score after the first jump in the finals. However, she crashed on her second jump and ended up in sixth place.

Xu brought home a silver medal from the Sochi 2014 Olympics with a score of 83.50 in the Ladies Aerials finals. She had obtained a score of 101.08 in jump 2 of Final 1, the highest score in the finals, but fell in Final 2.

In the 2018 Pyeongchang Olympics, Xu obtained a score of 91 in the first jump, placing her in second place, but crashed in the second jump and did not advance, ending up in 9th overall.

In the 2022 Beijing Olympics, Xu won a silver in the mixed team aerials, and also won a gold medal in the Women's Aerial Ski with a final score of 108.61, after landing a jump with three somersaults, edging out defending champion Hanna Huskova with an impressive score of 107.95 and Ashley Caldwell, who had the highest score in Final 1. In doing so, she became the first Chinese woman to win an Olympic gold in this event, after five previous silvers by Chinese athletes since the event was added in 1994.

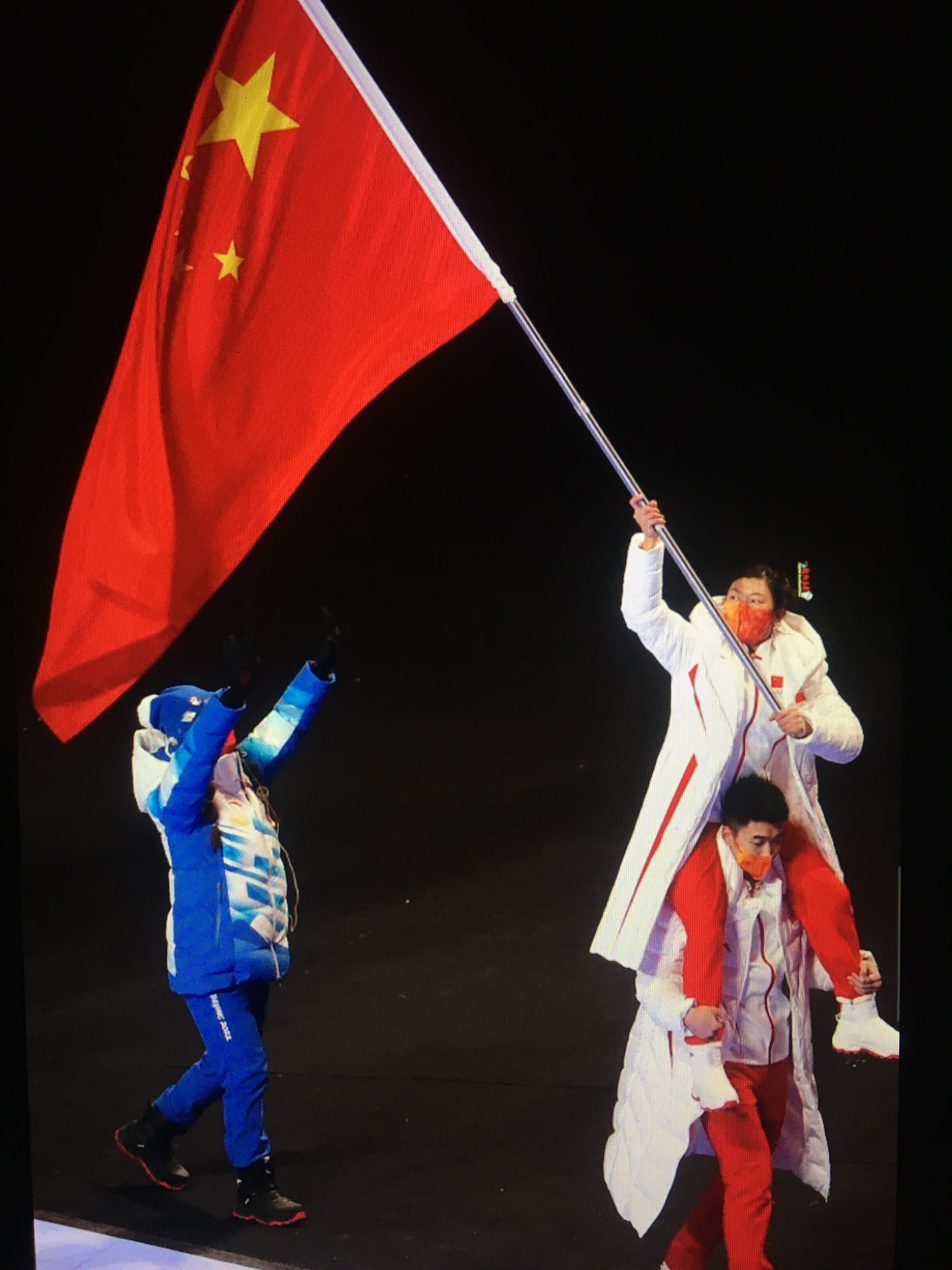
Xu (top) and Gao (bottom) as flag bearers for the closing ceremony

She represented China at the 2026 Winter Olympics and won a gold medal in the women's aerials event with a score of 112.90, with her husband Wang Xindi winning gold in the men's aerials event.

Year	Location	Result
2010	(Canada) Vancouver	6th Aerials
2014	(Russia) Sochi	(silver) Aerials
2018	(South Korea) Pyeongchang	9th Aerials
2022	(China) Beijing	(gold) Aerials
2026	(Italy) Milano-Cortina	(gold) Aerials

=== World Championships ===
Year	Location	Result
2009	(Japan) Inawashiro	(silver) Aerials
2011	(United States) Deer Valley	(silver) Aerials
2013	(Norway) Voss	(gold) Aerials
2015	(Austria) Kreischberg	(bronze) Aerials
2017	(Spain) Sierra Nevada	(bronze) Aerials
2019	(United States) Park City	(bronze) Aerials

=== World Cup ===
==== Standings ====
Season	Aerials
2006/07	16
2008/09	4
2009/10	3rd place, bronze medalist(s)
2010/11	2nd place, silver medalist(s)
2011/12	1st place, gold medalist(s)
2012/13	1st place, gold medalist(s)
2013/14	3rd place, bronze medalist(s)
2014/15	6
2015/16	27
2016/17	1st place, gold medalist(s)
2017/18	1st place, gold medalist(s)
2018/19	1st place, gold medalist(s)
2019/20	2nd place, silver medalist(s)

==== Individual wins ====
Date	Location
14 February 2009	(Russia) Moscow
20 December 2009	(China) Changchun
18 December 2010	(China) Beidahu
16 January 2011	(Canada) Sainte-Adèle
20 January 2012	(United States) Lake Placid
21 January 2012	(United States) Lake Placid
29 January 2012	(Canada) Calgary
3 February 2012	(United States) Park City
17 March 2012	(Norway) Voss
5 January 2013	(China) Changchun
12 January 2013	(Canada) Saint-Côme
18 January 2013	(United States) Lake Placid
1 February 2013	(United States) Park City
17 February 2013	(Russia) Sochi
20 December 2014	(China) Beijing
21 December 2014	(China) Beijing
17 December 2016	(China) Beidahu
10 February 2017	(South Korea) Bongpyeong
12 January 2018	(United States) Park City
20 January 2018	(United States) Lake Placid
19 January 2019	(United States) Lake Placid
23 February 2019	(Belarus) Minsk
3 March 2019	(China) Changchun
21 December 2019	(China) Changchun
22 December 2019	(China) Changchun
3 December 2021	(Finland) Kuusamo
5 January 2022	(Canada) Lac-Beauport

Olympic Games
Preceded by Wu Dajing	Flagbearer for China at the Olympics closing ceremony (with Gao Tingyu); Beijing 2022	Succeeded by Su Yiming
