= Pirmin Werner =

Swiss freestyle skier (born 2000)

Personal information
- Nationality: Swiss
- Born: 10 January 2000 (age 26) Beggingen, Switzerland

Sport
- Country: Switzerland
- Sport: Freestyle skiing
- Event: Aerials
- Club: Freestyle Company Jumpin
Medal record
Men's freestyle skiing
Representing Switzerland
Olympic Games
Silver medal – second place	2026 Milano Cortina	Mixed team aerials
World Championships
Silver medal – second place	2021 Almaty	Mixed team aerials
Bronze medal – third place	2025 Engadin	Aerials
Bronze medal – third place	2025 Engadin	Mixed team aerials

Pirmin Werner (born 10 January 2000) is a Swiss freestyle skier. He is a 2026 Winter Olympic silver medalist in mixed team aerials and a three-time World medalist.
