= Wang Xindi =

Chinese freestyle skier (born 1995)

Personal information
- Nationality: Chinese
- Born: 2 May 1995 (age 31) Qinhuangdao, Hebei, China
- Height: 1.74 m (5 ft 9 in)
- Weight: 65 kg (143 lb)
- Spouse: Xu Mengtao

Sport
- Country: China
- Sport: Freestyle skiing
- Event: Aerials
Medal record
Men's freestyle skiing
Representing China
Olympic Games
Gold medal – first place	2026 Milano Cortina	Aerials
Bronze medal – third place	2026 Milano Cortina	Mixed team aerials
World Championships
Silver medal – second place	2019 Utah	Mixed team aerials

Wang Xindi (Chinese: 王心迪; born 2 May 1995) is an Olympic Champion Chinese freestyle skier. He competed in the 2018, 2022, and 2026 Winter Olympics, winning a gold medal in 2026 Men's Aerials event along with his wife Xu Mengtao winning gold in the Women's Aerials event.
