= Ayana Zholdas =

Kazakhstani freestyle skier (born 2001)

Aiana Joldas
Personal information
- Native name: Аяна Жолдас
- Nationality: Kazakh
- Born: 9 June 2001 (age 25) Shymkent, Kazakhstan
- Height: 1.64 m (5 ft 5 in)

Sport
- Sport: Freestyle skiing
Medal record
Women's freestyle skiing
Representing Kazakhstan
Asian Games
Silver medal – second place	2025 Harbin	Mixed team aerials
Bronze medal – third place	2025 Harbin	Aerials
Bronze medal – third place	2025 Harbin	Synchro aerials

Aiana Joldas (Note: Often transliterated as Ayana Zholdas through a Russified Romanization of Аяна Жолдас.) (Kazakh: Аяна Жолдас; born 9 June 2001) is a Kazakh freestyle skier. She competed in the 2018 and 2026 Winter Olympics.
