= Freestyle skiing at the 2026 Winter Olympics =

Freestyle skiing at the XXV Olympic Winter Games
- Freestyle skiing pictogram
- Venue: Livigno Snow Park; Livigno Aerials & Moguls Park
- Dates: 7–22 February 2026
- No. of events: 15 (7 men, 7 women, 1 mixed)

Freestyle skiing at the 2026 Winter Olympics was held at the Livigno Snow Park and Livigno Aerials & Moguls Park in Valtellina, Italy. The events were held between 7 and 22 February 2026. A total of 15 freestyle skiing events were held, up from 13 in 2022. Dual moguls events are making Olympic debut.

== Competition schedule ==
The following was the competition schedule for all fifteen events.

Sessions that included the event finals are shown in bold.

All times are (UTC+1).

Date	Time	Event
7 February	10:30	Women's ski slopestyle
7 February	14:00	Men's ski slopestyle
9 February	12:30	**Women's ski slopestyle**
10 February	11:15	Men's moguls
10 February	12:30	**Men's ski slopestyle**
10 February	14:15	Women's moguls
11 February	11:00	**Women's moguls**
12 February	10:00	**Men's moguls**
14 February	10:30	**Women's dual moguls**
14 February	19:30	Women's big air
15 February	10:30	**Men's dual moguls**
15 February	19:30	Men's big air
16 February	19:30	**Women's big air**
17 February	19:30	**Men's big air**
18 February	10:00	Women's aerials
18 February	13:00	**Women's aerials**
19 February	19:30	Women's ski halfpipe
20 February	10:00	**Women's ski cross**
20 February	10:30	Men's aerials
20 February	10:30	Men's ski halfpipe
20 February	13:30	**Men's aerials**
20 February	19:30	**Men's ski halfpipe**
21 February	10:00	**Men's ski cross**
21 February	10:45	**Mixed team aerials**
22 February	10:40	**Women's ski halfpipe**

== Medal summary ==
=== Medal table ===
* Host nation (Italy)

Rank	Nation	Gold	Silver	Bronze	Total
1	United States	3	4	1	8
2	China	3	3	3	9
3	Canada	2	1	2	5
4	Australia	2	1	1	4
5	Norway	2	0	0	2
6	Switzerland	1	3	1	5
7	Italy*	1	1	1	3
8	Germany	1	0	0	1
9	Japan	0	1	1	2
10	Estonia	0	1	0	1
11	Austria	0	0	1	1
11	France	0	0	1	1
11	Great Britain	0	0	1	1
11	New Zealand	0	0	1	1
11	Sweden	0	0	1	1
Totals (15 entries)		15	15	15	45

=== Men's events ===
Event	Gold		Silver		Bronze	
Aerials	Wang Xindi; China	132.60	Noé Roth; Switzerland	131.58	Li Tianma; China	123.93
Big air	Tormod Frostad; Norway	195.50	Mac Forehand; United States	193.25	Matěj Švancer; Austria	191.25
Halfpipe	Alex Ferreira; United States	93.75	Henry Sildaru; Estonia	93.00	Brendan Mackay; Canada	91.00
Slopestyle	Birk Ruud; Norway	86.28	Alex Hall; United States	85.75	Luca Harrington; New Zealand	85.15
Moguls	Cooper Woods-Topalovic; Australia	83.71	Mikaël Kingsbury; Canada	83.71	Ikuma Horishima; Japan	83.44
Dual moguls	Mikaël Kingsbury; Canada		Ikuma Horishima; Japan		Matt Graham; Australia	
Ski cross	Simone Deromedis; Italy		Federico Tomasoni; Italy		Alex Fiva; Switzerland	

=== Women's events ===
Event	Gold		Silver		Bronze	
Aerials	Xu Mengtao; China	112.90	Danielle Scott; Australia	102.17	Shao Qi; China	101.90
Big air	Megan Oldham; Canada	180.75	Eileen Gu; China	179.00	Flora Tabanelli; Italy	178.25
Halfpipe	Eileen Gu; China	94.75	Li Fanghui; China	93.00	Zoe Atkin; Great Britain	92.50
Slopestyle	Mathilde Gremaud; Switzerland	86.96	Eileen Gu; China	86.58	Megan Oldham; Canada	76.46
Moguls	Elizabeth Lemley; United States	82.30	Jaelin Kauf; United States	80.77	Perrine Laffont; France	78.00
Dual moguls	Jakara Anthony; Australia		Jaelin Kauf; United States		Elizabeth Lemley; United States	
Ski cross	Daniela Maier; Germany		Fanny Smith; Switzerland		Sandra Näslund; Sweden	

=== Mixed ===
Event	Gold		Silver		Bronze	
Team aerials	United States; Kaila Kuhn; Connor Curran; Christopher Lillis	325.35	Switzerland; Lina Kozomara; Pirmin Werner; Noé Roth	296.91	China; Xu Mengtao; Wang Xindi; Li Tianma	279.68

== Participating nations ==
25 nations sent freestyle skiers to compete in the events, including the IOC's designation of Individual Neutral Atheletes. South Africa debuted in the sport. The numbers of athletes are shown in parentheses.

- Australia (14)
- Austria (13)
- Canada (32)
- Chile (1)
- China (23)
- Czech Republic (6)
- Estonia (3)
- Finland (8)
- France (19)
- Germany (11)
- Great Britain (8)
- Ireland (1)
- Italy (10)
- Japan (20)
- Kazakhstan (9)
- New Zealand (10)
- Norway (5)
- Individual Neutral Athletes (3)
- South Korea (7)
- South Africa (1)
- Slovakia (1)
- Sweden (10)
- Switzerland (20)
- Ukraine (9)
- United States (32)
