= FIS Freestyle Ski and Snowboarding World Championships 2025 =

International championships

- Host city: St. Moritz & Silvaplana
- Country: Switzerland
- Events: 30
- Opening: 18 March 2025
- Closing: 30 March 2025
- Website: Engadin 2025

The 2025 FIS Freestyle Ski and Snowboarding World Championships were held in the Engadin region of Switzerland from 18 to 30 March 2025.

A total of 30 medal events were on the program, with 16 being contested in the freestyle and freeski disciplines and 14 in snowboarding. St. Moritz hosted the big air, moguls, aerials, ski & snowboard cross and the alpine snowboard events, whereas Silvaplana hosted the slopestyle and halfpipe events.

== Host selection ==
Engadin was awarded host of the 2025 Freestyle Ski and Snowboarding World Championships by being the lone applicant at the end of the application period in April 2021.

== Schedule ==
30 events were held.

Q	Qualification	F	Final

Event ↓ / Date →	March														
Event ↓ / Date →	Tue 18	Wed 19	Thu 20		Fri 21	Sat 22		Sun 23	Mon 24	Tue 25	Wed 26	Thu 27	Fri 28	Sat 29	Sun 30
Freestyle skiing
Ski cross			Q		F										
Ski cross team						F									
Aerials														Q	F
Team aerials												F			
Moguls	Q	F													
Dual moguls					F										
Slopestyle		Q			F										
Halfpipe													Q		F
Big air											Q^{W}	Q^{M}		F	
Snowboarding
Snowboard cross												Q	F		
Snowboard cross team														F	
Parallel giant slalom			Q	F											
Parallel slalom						Q	F								
Parallel slalom team								F							
Slopestyle			Q		F										
Halfpipe												Q		F	
Big air										Q^{M}	Q^{W}		F		

== Medal summary ==
=== Medal table ===
* Host nation (Switzerland)

Rank	Nation	Gold	Silver	Bronze	Total
1	Switzerland*	5	1	3	9
2	Japan	4	8	5	17
3	United States	4	4	4	12
4	Italy	4	1	2	7
5	Canada	3	2	3	8
6	New Zealand	3	0	0	3
7	France	2	2	1	5
8	Australia	1	1	2	4
9	Czech Republic	1	1	0	2
9	Great Britain	1	1	0	2
11	Norway	1	0	1	2
12	Bulgaria	1	0	0	1
13	China	0	3	0	3
14	Austria	0	2	2	4
15	Germany	0	2	1	3
16	Finland	0	1	1	2
17	Ukraine	0	1	0	1
18	South Korea	0	0	2	2
19	Kazakhstan	0	0	1	1
19	Netherlands	0	0	1	1
19	Poland	0	0	1	1
Totals (21 entries)		30	30	30	90

=== Freestyle skiing ===
==== Men ====
Event	Gold		Silver		Bronze	
Ski cross	Ryan Regez; Switzerland		Tobias Müller; Germany		Ryō Sugai; Japan	
Dual moguls	Mikaël Kingsbury; Canada		Ikuma Horishima; Japan		Matt Graham; Australia	
Aerials	Noé Roth; Switzerland	143.31	Quinn Dehlinger; United States	123.53	Pirmin Werner; Switzerland	107.12
Moguls	Ikuma Horishima; Japan	89.03	Mikaël Kingsbury; Canada	82.68	Jung Dae-yoon; South Korea	81.76
Slopestyle	Birk Ruud; Norway	89.10	Mac Forehand; United States	85.53	Alex Hall; United States	84.72
Halfpipe	Finley Melville Ives; New Zealand	96.00	Nick Goepper; United States	94.00	Alex Ferreira; United States	92.50
Big air	Luca Harrington; New Zealand	192.00	Elias Syrjä; Finland	184.25	Birk Ruud; Norway	183.00

==== Women ====
Event	Gold		Silver		Bronze	
Ski cross	Fanny Smith; Switzerland		Courtney Hoffos; Canada		Daniela Maier; Germany	
Dual moguls	Jaelin Kauf; United States		Tess Johnson; United States		Anastassiya Gorodko; Kazakhstan	
Aerials	Kaila Kuhn; United States	105.13	Xu Mengtao; China	99.16	Danielle Scott; Australia	96.93
Moguls	Perrine Laffont; France	77.92	Hinako Tomitaka; Japan	75.15	Maïa Schwinghammer; Canada	74.92
Slopestyle	Mathilde Gremaud; Switzerland	85.65	Lara Wolf; Austria	73.33	Megan Oldham; Canada	70.63
Halfpipe	Zoe Atkin; Great Britain	93.50	Li Fanghui; China	93.00	Cassie Sharpe; Canada	88.00
Big air	Flora Tabanelli; Italy	176.75	Sarah Höfflin; Switzerland	170.75	Anni Kärävä; Finland	167.75

==== Mixed ====
Event	Gold		Silver		Bronze	
Team aerials	United States; Kaila Kuhn; Quinn Dehlinger; Christopher Lillis	344.63	Ukraine; Anhelina Brykina; Oleksandr Okipniuk; Dmytro Kotovskyi	312.35	Switzerland; Lina Kozomara; Noé Roth; Pirmin Werner	281.43
Team ski cross	Switzerland; Ryan Regez; Fanny Smith		France; Melvin Tchiknavorian; Jade Grillet Aubert		Italy; Yanick Gunsch; Jole Galli	

=== Snowboarding ===
==== Men ====
Games	Gold		Silver		Bronze	
Parallel giant slalom	Roland Fischnaller; Italy		Stefan Baumeister; Germany		Lee Sang-ho; South Korea	
Parallel slalom	Tervel Zamfirov; Bulgaria		Arvid Auner; Austria		Aaron March; Italy	
Snowboard cross	Éliot Grondin; Canada		Loan Bozzolo; France		Alessandro Hämmerle; Austria	
Slopestyle	Liam Brearley; Canada	90.15	Su Yiming; China	85.07	Oliver Martin; United States	78.98
Halfpipe	Scotty James; Australia	95.00	Ruka Hirano; Japan	92.25	Yūto Totsuka; Japan	92.00
Big air	Ryoma Kimata; Japan	176.75	Taiga Hasegawa; Japan	174.50	Oliver Martin; United States	171.75

==== Women ====
Games	Gold		Silver		Bronze	
Parallel giant slalom	Ester Ledecká; Czech Republic		Tsubaki Miki; Japan		Aleksandra Król-Walas; Poland	
Parallel slalom	Tsubaki Miki; Japan		Ester Ledecká; Czech Republic		Michelle Dekker; Netherlands	
Snowboard cross	Michela Moioli; Italy		Charlotte Bankes; Great Britain		Julia Pereira de Sousa Mabileau; France	
Slopestyle	Zoi Sadowski-Synnott; New Zealand	90.15	Kokomo Murase; Japan	87.02	Reira Iwabuchi; Japan	83.55
Halfpipe	Chloe Kim; United States	93.50	Sara Shimizu; Japan	90.75	Mitsuki Ono; Japan	88.50
Big air	Kokomo Murase; Japan	162.50	Reira Iwabuchi; Japan	156.00	Mari Fukada; Japan	153.25

==== Mixed ====
Event	Gold	Silver	Bronze
Parallel slalom team	Italy; Maurizio Bormolini; Elisa Caffont	Italy; Gabriel Messner; Jasmin Coratti	Austria; Andreas Prommegger; Sabine Payer
Snowboard cross team	France; Loan Bozzolo; Julia Pereira de Sousa Mabileau	Australia; Cameron Bolton; Mia Clift	Switzerland; Valerio Jud; Sina Siegenthaler

== See also ==
- 2024–25 FIS Freestyle Ski World Cup
- 2024–25 FIS Snowboard World Cup
