= Aerial skiing =

Freestyle skiing discipline

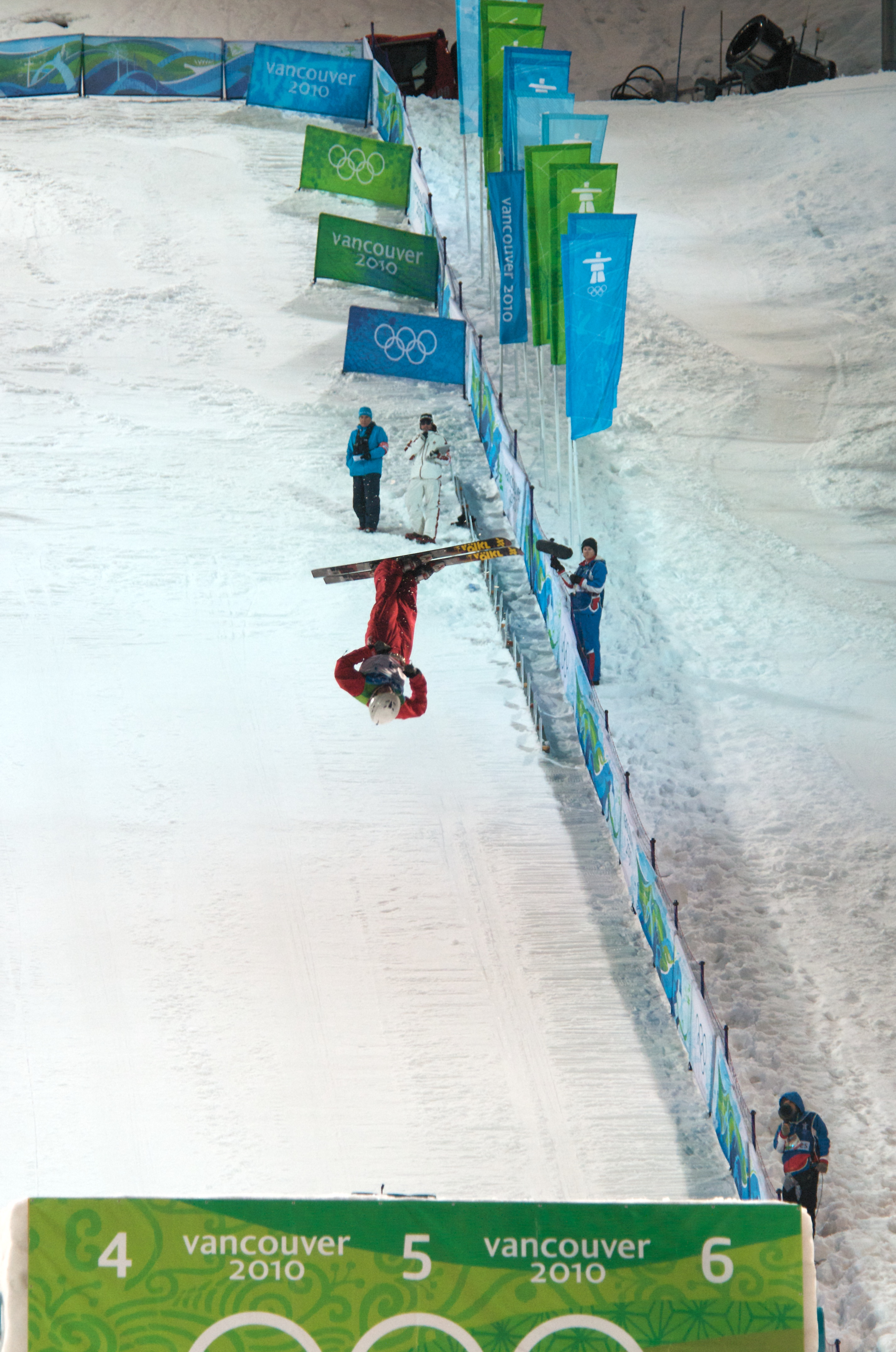
- Skier performing an aerials jump during the 2010 Winter Olympics
- Highest governing body: International Ski Federation

Characteristics
- Type: Freestyle skiing

Presence
- Country or region: Worldwide
- Olympic: 1988 and 1992 as demonstration event; Medal event since 1994

Aerial skiing or aerials is a freestyle skiing discipline where athletes ski down a slope to launch themselves off a kicker (a vertically inclined ramp) and perform multiple twists and flips before landing on an inclined landing hill. Aerialists are scored on their jumps based on air, form and landing with their score multiplied by the degree of difficulty of the jump they performed.

Internationally, the sport is contested at the FIS Freestyle Ski World Cup, FIS Freestyle World Ski Championships, and the Winter Olympic Games.

== Overview ==
Skiers begin at the top of a large hill and ski down a slope (known as an inrun) to launch themselves off one of two or three vertically inclined kickers. They may select which kicker to use for their specific jump as kickers vary in inclination and height. After launching themselves off the kicker, skiers then complete several twists and flips before attempting to land upwards on a declining hill of prepared snow. Jumps are scored by a panel of judges.

Aerial skiing competitions takes place at an aerials site which must follow standards set by the International Ski Federation (FIS). These include the inrun being at an angle of 25° and 70 metres (230 ft) long, and the landing hill being at an angle of 38° and 25 to 30 metres (82 to 98 ft) long. Kickers range from 8 to 20 feet (2.4 to 6.1 m) tall, with the tallest kickers launching skiers 45 to 50 feet (14 to 15 m) above the landing hill.

The skis used in aerials are generally lighter and shorter than other skis which makes them easier to control during the jumps; the tails and tips are also more flexible than regular skis. All competitors must wear a ski helmet while competing.

== History ==
Performing a somersault on skis has origins in 1906 with the development of "stunt skiing", while aerials as a discipline was popularized in the 1950s by Olympic gold medalist Stein Eriksen.

Aerials events have featured since the first FIS Freestyle Ski World Cup in 1980 and FIS Freestyle World Ski Championships in 1986.

Freestyle skiing was recognized as a sport by the International Ski Federation in 1979 and was initially added to the 1988 Winter Olympics as a demonstration event. After appearing as a demonstration event for the 1988 and 1992 Winter Olympics, aerials became a full medal event since the 1994 Winter Olympics.

At the 2022 Winter Olympics, the mixed team aerials was added as a medal event. The event involves three skiers (with at least one of each gender) competing as a team, with their individual scores being added together to form a team score.

== Training ==
During summer months, aerialists train by performing jumps off specially constructed water ramps and landing in a swimming pool. Aerialists may also use trampolines to practice techniques specific to aerials such as a straight body position.

== Scoring ==
In competitions, jumps are evaluated by a panel of five judges. Each judge gives a score for three components: air (out of 2.0), form (out of 5.0) and landing (out of 3.0). The high and low scores for each component are then discarded and the three scores in each component are summed to give the total judge's score out of 30. The total judge's score is then multiplied by the jump's degree of difficulty.

=== Criteria ===
Air includes optimal take-off, height, distance and trajectory of a jump. Form includes positioning of the body, precision of performance, balance, mechanics and stability while in the air as well as the timing of the jump. Landing includes body position, ski snow contact on impact, compression, any body contact with the snow and exiting to the finish area. Competitors must perform the jump they indicated beforehand.

Each of the approved jumps is pre-assigned a degree of difficulty score. In general, the greater number of flips and twists a jump contains, the higher the degree of difficulty will be.
