= FIS Freestyle World Ski Championships 2013 – Women's aerials =

The women's aerials competition of the FIS Freestyle World Ski Championships 2013 was held at Myrkdalen-Voss, Norway on March 6 (qualifying) and March 7 (finals). 22 athletes from 8 countries competed.

== Qualification ==
The following are the results of the qualification.

Rank	Bib	Name	Country	Q1	Q2	Notes
1	1	Xu Mengtao	China	93.76		Q
2	23	Kong Fanyu	China	85.99		Q
3	5	Zhang Xin	China	84.42		Q
4	7	Danielle Scott	Australia	81.49		Q
5	16	Veronika Korsunova	Russia	80.62		Q
6	4	Laura Peel	Australia	79.06		Q
7	6	Nadiya Didenko	Ukraine	75.60	84.60	Q
8	8	Tanja Schärer	Switzerland	72.79	82.84	Q
9	2	Emily Cook	United States	57.45	82.53	Q
10	21	Xu Sicun	China	59.16	79.69	Q
11	14	Samantha Wells	Australia	54.23	78.43	Q
12	3	Lydia Lassila	Australia	63.80	76.54	Q
13	15	Alina Gridneva	Russia	51.62	74.97	
14	9	Kiley Mckinnon	United States	75.11	74.34	
15	10	Allison Lee	United States	54.49	73.95	
16	12	Olga Polyuk	Ukraine	35.96	72.13	
17	20	Zhanbota Aldabergenova	Kazakhstan	68.64	70.47	
18	22	Zhibek Arapbayeva	Kazakhstan	58.22	55.64	
19	11	Madison Olsen	United States	63.18	55.39	
20	17	Sabrina Guerin	Canada	73.08	50.40	
21	19	Nadiya Mokhnatska	Ukraine	50.02	38.74	
	13	Anastasiya Novosad	Ukraine	DNS	DNS	

== Final ==
The following are the results of the finals.

Rank	Bib	Name	Country	Final 1	Final 2	Final 3
1st place, gold medalist(s)	1	Xu Mengtao	China	82.95	90.82	98.53
2nd place, silver medalist(s)	16	Veronika Korsunova	Russia	87.88	80.04	75.26
3rd place, bronze medalist(s)	7	Danielle Scott	Australia	84.73	82.07	74.10
4	21	Xu Sicun	China	86.62	75.40	38.42
5	3	Lydia Lassila	Australia	85.99	73.32	
6	14	Samantha Wells	Australia	84.10	61.42	
7	8	Tanja Schärer	Switzerland	83.47	47.56	
8	4	Laura Peel	Australia	86.31	43.00	
9	6	Nadiya Didenko	Ukraine	82.21		
10	2	Emily Cook	United States	80.95		
11	23	Kong Fanyu	China	80.01		
12	5	Zhang Xin	China	55.44		
