= FIS Freestyle World Ski Championships 2011 – Women's aerials =

The women's aerials competition of the FIS Freestyle World Ski Championships 2011 was held at Deer Valley, United States on February 3 and 4, 2011 (qualifications and finals).

== Qualification ==
The following are the results of the qualification.

Rank	Bib	Name	Country	Jump 1	Jump 2	Total	Notes
1	10	Emily Cook	United States	97.64	84.10	181.74	Q
2	1	Xu Mengtao	China	83.36	87.41	170.77	Q
3	11	Ashley Caldwell	United States	82.66	83.47	166.13	Q
4	17	Kong Fanyu	China	83.37	78.59	161.96	Q
5	15	Hanna Huskova	Belarus	80.32	78.30	158.62	Q
6	8	Zhao Shanshan	China	76.12	81.58	157.70	Q
7	7	Tanja Schärer	Switzerland	77.33	76.70	154.03	Q
8	16	Crystal Lee	Canada	71.97	76.12	148.09	Q
9	3	Olha Volkova	Ukraine	78.90	65.78	144.68	Q
10	18	Laura Peel	Australia	74.82	65.91	140.73	Q
11	2	Cheng Shuang	China	52.34	87.06	139.40	Q
12	12	Olga Polyuk	Ukraine	66.78	72.21	138.99	Q
13	20	Sarah Ainsworth	United Kingdom	65.97	55.59	121.56	
14	9	Nadiya Didenko	Ukraine	44.41	77.01	121.42	
15	13	Sabrina Guerin	Canada	32.44	78.01	110.45	
	5	Alla Tsuper	Belarus			DNS	

== Final ==
The following are the results of the final.

Rank	Bib	Name	Country	Total
1st place, gold medalist(s)	2	Cheng Shuang	China	188.40
2nd place, silver medalist(s)	1	Xu Mengtao	China	188.23
3rd place, bronze medalist(s)	3	Olha Volkova	Ukraine	178.59
4	11	Ashley Caldwell	United States	173.73
5	17	Kong Fanyu	China	168.80
6	8	Zhao Shanshan	China	161.05
7	10	Emily Cook	United States	159.15
8	12	Olga Polyuk	Ukraine	157.33
9	15	Hanna Huskova	Belarus	152.99
10	16	Crystal Lee	Canada	143.36
11	18	Laura Peel	Australia	142.19
12	7	Tanja Schärer	Switzerland	118.80
