= Freestyle skiing at the 2014 Winter Olympics – Women's aerials =

Women's aerials at the XXII Olympic Winter Games
- Venue: Rosa Khutor Extreme Park, Krasnaya Polyana, Russia
- Dates: 14 February 2014
- Competitors: 22 from 9 nations
- Winning score: 98.01

Medalists
1st place, gold medalist(s)		Alla Tsuper	Belarus
2nd place, silver medalist(s)		Xu Mengtao	China
3rd place, bronze medalist(s)		Lydia Lassila	Australia

The women's aerials event in freestyle skiing at the 2014 Winter Olympics in Sochi, Russia took place 14 February 2014.

The gold medal was won by Alla Tsuper, Belarus, the silver medal by Xu Mengtao, China and the bronze medal was won by Lydia Lassila, Australia.

== Qualification ==
An athlete had to have placed in the top 30 in at a World Cup event after July 2012 or at the 2013 World Championships and a minimum of 80 FIS points. A total of 25 quota spots were available to athletes to compete at the games. A maximum of 4 athletes could be entered by a National Olympic Committee.

After the quotas were awarded and reallocated only 22 out of 25 quota spots were distributed.

== Results ==
=== Qualification 1 ===
The qualification 1 was held at 17:45.

Rank	Bib	Name	Country	Score	Note
1	8	Ashley Caldwell	United States	101.25	Q
2	1	Li Nina	China	86.71	Q
3	6	Danielle Scott	Australia	85.36	Q
4	5	Cheng Shuang	China	83.19	Q
5	7	Emily Cook	United States	80.01	Q
6	17	Assoli Slivets	Russia	78.40	Q
7	12	Samantha Wells	Australia	78.12	
8	20	Aleksandra Orlova	Russia	76.27	
9	19	Zhanbota Aldabergenova	Kazakhstan	74.82	
10	16	Veronika Korsunova	Russia	72.50	
11	3	Xu Mengtao	China	71.44	
12	24	Olga Polyuk	Ukraine	70.76	
13	9	Laura Peel	Australia	67.68	
14	13	Alla Tsuper	Belarus	66.15	
15	4	Lydia Lassila	Australia	66.12	
16	28	Zhibek Arapbayeva	Kazakhstan	63.44	
17	2	Zhang Xin	China	60.98	
18	21	Anastasiya Novosad	Ukraine	56.84	
19	26	Nadiya Mokhnatska	Ukraine	52.44	
20	30	Joselane Santos	Brazil	49.60	
21	18	Tanja Schaerer	Switzerland	48.72	
22	27	Hanna Huskova	Belarus	44.08	
	29	Nadiya Didenko	Ukraine	DNS	

=== Qualification 2 ===
The qualification 2 was held at 18:30.

Rank	Bib	Name	Country	Score	Note
1	4	Lydia Lassila	Australia	90.65	Q
2	3	Xu Mengtao	China	87.15	Q
3	9	Laura Peel	Australia	85.99	Q
4	16	Veronika Korsunova	Russia	81.58	Q
5	19	Zhanbota Aldabergenova	Kazakhstan	78.12	Q
6	13	Alla Tsuper	Belarus	77.52	Q
7	2	Zhang Xin	China	77.49	
8	18	Tanja Schaerer	Switzerland	77.17	
9	24	Olga Polyuk	Ukraine	74.97	
10	21	Anastasiya Novosad	Ukraine	74.34	
11	26	Nadiya Mokhnatska	Ukraine	69.31	
12	12	Samantha Wells	Australia	67.13	
13	28	Zhibek Arapbayeva	Kazakhstan	58.87	
14	20	Aleksandra Orlova	Russia	55.75	
15	27	Hanna Huskova	Belarus	52.60	
16	30	Joselane Santos	Brazil	48.17	
	29	Nadiya Didenko	Ukraine	DNS	

=== Finals ===
The finals were started at 21:30.

Rank	Bib	Name	Country	Round 1	Rank	Round 2	Rank	Round 3	Rank
1st place, gold medalist(s)	13	Alla Tsuper	Belarus	99.18	1	88.50	4	98.01	1
2nd place, silver medalist(s)	3	Xu Mengtao	China	90.65	3	101.08	1	83.50	2
3rd place, bronze medalist(s)	4	Lydia Lassila	Australia	95.76	2	99.22	2	72.12	3
4	1	Li Nina	China	90.24	4	89.53	3	46.02	4
5	5	Cheng Shuang	China	80.01	7	87.42	5	did not advance	
6	19	Zhanbota Aldabergenova	Kazakhstan	76.23	8	68.44	6	did not advance	
7	9	Laura Peel	Australia	83.79	5	64.50	7	did not advance	
8	7	Emily Cook	United States	82.21	6	64.50	8	did not advance	
9	6	Danielle Scott	Australia	76.23	9	did not advance			
10	8	Ashley Caldwell	United States	72.80	10	did not advance			
11	16	Veronika Korsunova	Russia	68.35	11	did not advance			
12	17	Assoli Slivets	Russia	62.30	12	did not advance			
