= Freestyle skiing at the 2022 Winter Olympics – Women's aerials =

Women's aerials at the XXIV Olympic Winter Games
- Freestyle skiing
- Venue: Genting Snow Park, Zhangjiakou
- Date: 14 February 2022
- Competitors: 24 from 10 nations
- Winning points: 108.61

Medalists
| 1st place, gold medalist(s) | | Xu Mengtao | China |
| 2nd place, silver medalist(s) | | Hanna Huskova | Belarus |
| 3rd place, bronze medalist(s) | | Megan Nick | United States |

The women's aerials competition in freestyle skiing at the 2022 Winter Olympics was held on 14 February at the Genting Snow Park in Zhangjiakou. 2014 silver medalist Xu Mengtao of China won the event, which became her first Olympic gold medal. Defending champion Hanna Huskova of Belarus won the silver medal, and Megan Nick of the United States bronze. For Nick, this was her first Olympic medal.

The defending champion is Hanna Huskova. The 2018 silver medalist Zhang Xin did not qualify for the Olympics, but the bronze medalist Kong Fanyu did. Xu Mengtao was leading the 2021–22 FIS Freestyle Ski World Cup ranking before the Olympics, with Kong Fanyu close second. Laura Peel is the 2021 world champion.

== Qualification ==
A total of 25 aerialists qualified to compete at the games. For an athlete to compete they must have a minimum of 80.00 FIS points on the FIS Points List on January 17, 2022 and a top 30 finish in a World Cup event or at the FIS Freestyle Ski World Championships 2021. A country could enter a maximum of four athletes into the event.

== Results ==
=== Qualification 1 ===
| Rank | Bib | Order | Name | Country | Score | Notes |
|---|---|---|---|---|---|---|
| 1 | 3 | 17 | Laura Peel | Australia | 104.54 | Q |
| 2 | 23 | 25 | Ashley Caldwell | United States | 101.31 | Q |
| 3 | 1 | 2 | Xu Mengtao | China | 101.10 | Q |
| 4 | 4 | 14 | Danielle Scott | Australia | 96.23 | Q |
| 5 | 8 | 12 | Marion Thénault | Canada | 93.06 | Q |
| 6 | 12 | 11 | Hanna Huskova | Belarus | 92.00 | Q |
| 7 | 25 | 15 | Megan Nick | United States | 89.18 | |
| 8 | 13 | 23 | Kaila Kuhn | United States | 84.24 | |
| 9 | 2 | 8 | Kong Fanyu | China | 83.78 | |
| 10 | 18 | 6 | Eseniia Pantiukhova | ROC | 82.84 | |
| 11 | 20 | 24 | Anastasiya Andryianava | Belarus | 81.58 | |
| 12 | 7 | 16 | Zhanbota Aldabergenova | Kazakhstan | 80.56 | |
| 13 | 14 | 19 | Winter Vinecki | United States | 78.96 | |
| 14 | 21 | 22 | Anastasiia Prytkova | ROC | 78.43 | |
| 15 | 6 | 10 | Shao Qi | China | 77.49 | |
| 16 | 19 | 7 | Naomy Boudreau-Guertin | Canada | 77.43 | |
| 17 | 17 | 20 | Gabi Ash | Australia | 77.17 | |
| 18 | 9 | 9 | Flavie Aumond | Canada | 76.86 | |
| 19 | 16 | 13 | Akmarzhan Kalmurzayeva | Kazakhstan | 70.86 | |
| 20 | 10 | 5 | Olga Polyuk | Ukraine | 68.76 | |
| 21 | 24 | 4 | Alexandra Bär | Switzerland | 67.72 | |
| 22 | 11 | 18 | Emma Weiß | Germany | 65.52 | |
| 23 | 22 | 1 | Liubov Nikitina | ROC | 63.80 | |
| 24 | 15 | 3 | Anna Derugo | Belarus | 58.59 | |
| | 5 | 21 | Anastasiya Novosad | Ukraine | DNS | |

=== Qualification 2 ===
| Rank | Bib | Order | Name | Country | Round 1 | Round 2 | Best | Notes |
|---|---|---|---|---|---|---|---|---|
| 1 | 16 | 10 | Akmarzhan Kalmurzayeva | Kazakhstan | 70.86 | 98.68 | 98.68 | Q |
| 2 | 25 | 11 | Megan Nick | United States | 89.18 | 85.65 | 89.18 | Q |
| 3 | 13 | 18 | Kaila Kuhn | United States | 84.24 | 86.62 | 86.62 | Q |
| 4 | 2 | 7 | Kong Fanyu | China | 83.78 | 81.99 | 83.78 | Q |
| 5 | 18 | 5 | Eseniia Pantiukhova | ROC | 82.84 | 77.43 | 82.84 | Q |
| 6 | 20 | 19 | Anastasiya Andryianava | Belarus | 81.58 | DNS | 81.58 | Q |
| 7 | 7 | 12 | Zhanbota Aldabergenova | Kazakhstan | 80.56 | 68.26 | 80.56 | |
| 8 | 17 | 15 | Gabi Ash | Australia | 77.17 | 80.04 | 80.04 | |
| 9 | 14 | 14 | Winter Vinecki | United States | 78.96 | 70.56 | 78.96 | |
| 10 | 21 | 17 | Anastasiia Prytkova | ROC | 78.43 | 77.43 | 78.43 | |
| 11 | 6 | 9 | Shao Qi | China | 77.49 | 54.90 | 77.49 | |
| 12 | 19 | 6 | Naomy Boudreau-Guertin | Canada | 77.43 | 67.04 | 77.43 | |
| 13 | 9 | 8 | Flavie Aumond | Canada | 76.86 | 73.95 | 76.86 | |
| 14 | 11 | 13 | Emma Weiß | Germany | 65.52 | 75.98 | 75.98 | |
| 15 | 22 | 1 | Liubov Nikitina | ROC | 63.80 | 69.30 | 69.30 | |
| 16 | 10 | 4 | Olga Polyuk | Ukraine | 68.76 | 56.68 | 68.76 | |
| 17 | 24 | 3 | Alexandra Bär | Switzerland | 67.72 | 56.26 | 67.72 | |
| 18 | 15 | 2 | Anna Derugo | Belarus | 58.59 | 53.65 | 58.59 | |
| | 5 | 16 | Anastasiya Novosad | Ukraine | Did not start | | | |

=== Finals ===
| Rank | Bib | Name | Country | Final 1 | | | Final 2 |
| Rank | Bib | Name | Country | Jump 1 | Jump 2 | Best | Final 2 |
|---|---|---|---|---|---|---|---|
| 1st place, gold medalist(s) | 1 | Xu Mengtao | China | 103.89 | DNS | 103.89 | 108.61 |
| 2nd place, silver medalist(s) | 12 | Hanna Huskova | Belarus | 89.41 | 92.00 | 92.00 | 107.95 |
| 3rd place, bronze medalist(s) | 25 | Megan Nick | United States | 95.17 | 90.24 | 95.17 | 93.76 |
| 4 | 23 | Ashley Caldwell | United States | 103.92 | 105.60 | 105.60 | 83.71 |
| 5 | 3 | Laura Peel | Australia | 69.16 | 100.02 | 100.02 | 78.56 |
| 6 | 2 | Kong Fanyu | China | 102.71 | 62.24 | 102.71 | 59.67 |
| 7 | 8 | Marion Thénault | Canada | 66.97 | 91.29 | 91.29 | —N/a |
| 8 | 13 | Kaila Kuhn | United States | 76.49 | 85.68 | 85.68 | —N/a |
| 9 | 18 | Eseniia Pantiukhova | ROC | 78.75 | 58.29 | 78.75 | —N/a |
| 10 | 4 | Danielle Scott | Australia | 71.23 | 64.79 | 71.23 | —N/a |
| 11 | 16 | Akmarzhan Kalmurzayeva | Kazakhstan | 52.36 | 71.23 | 71.23 | —N/a |
| 12 | 20 | Anastasiya Andryianava | Belarus | 59.22 | 70.11 | 70.11 | —N/a |
