= FIS Freestyle Ski and Snowboarding World Championships 2019 – Women's aerials =

Women's aerials at the FIS Freestyle Ski and Snowboarding World Championships 2019
- Venue: Deer Valley
- Location: Utah, United States
- Dates: February 5–6
- Competitors: 20 from 10 nations
- Winning points: 113.18

Medalists
gold medal	Aliaksandra Ramanouskaya	Belarus
silver medal	Liubov Nikitina	Russia
bronze medal	Xu Mengtao	China

The Women's aerials competition at the FIS Freestyle Ski and Snowboarding World Championships 2019 was held on February 5 and 6, 2019.

== Qualification ==
The qualification was started on February, 5 at 20:00. The twelve best skiers qualified for the final.

Rank	Bib	Start order	Name	Country	Q1	Q2	Notes
2	1	12	Xu Mengtao	China	85.05		Q
3	6	21	Liubov Nikitina	Russia	80.32		Q
1	9	2	Laura Peel	Australia	80.01		Q
4	2	7	Shao Qi	China	80.01		Q
5	10	11	Olga Polyuk	Ukraine	79.06		Q
6	12	22	Aliaksandra Ramanouskaya	Belarus	75.60		Q
7	21	20	Zhanbota Aldabergenova	Kazakhstan	75.60	69.60	Q
8	11	10	Ashley Caldwell	United States	74.02	42.63	Q
9	23	9	Akmarzhan Kalmurzayeva	Kazakhstan	71.63	50.18	Q
10	7	4	Sofia Alekseeva	Russia	64.09	68.97	Q
11	22	6	Morgan Northrop	United States	68.04	65.83	Q
12	19	1	Emma Weiß	Germany	66.97	47.84	Q
13	20	5	Kaila Kuhn	United States	62.35	65.72	
14	8	16	Xu Sicun	China	61.11	65.54	
15	13	18	Carol Bouvard	Switzerland	36.83	64.89	
16	3	3	Xu Nuo	China	64.57	57.71	
17	4	13	Madison Varmette	United States	63.94	42.92	
18	5	8	Winter Vinecki	United States	55.44	21.75	T 15.0
19	15	19	Brittany George	Australia	55.44	53.07	T 14.1
20	16	15	Catrine Lavallée	Canada	17.32	41.47	
—	14	17	Marzhan Akzhigit	Kazakhstan	Did not start		
—	24	14	Zhibek Arapbayeva	Kazakhstan	Did not start		

== Final ==
The final was started on February 6, at 19:00.

Rank	Bib	Name	Country	Run 1	Run 2	Best	Run 3	Notes
1st place, gold medalist(s)	12	Aliaksandra Ramanouskaya	Belarus	103.11	DNS	103.11	113.18	
2nd place, silver medalist(s)	6	Liubov Nikitina	Russia	83.16	91.29	91.29	89.88	Tie 17.7
3rd place, bronze medalist(s)	1	Xu Mengtao	China	90.94	74.65	90.94	89.88	Tie 17.0
4	9	Laura Peel	Australia	83.16	86.01	83.16	87.77	
5	11	Ashley Caldwell	United States	86.19	66.11	86.19	58.81	
6	7	Sofia Alekseeva	Russia	85.68	64.09	85.68	37.80	
7	10	Olga Polyuk	Ukraine	82.08	69.37	82.08		
8	23	Akmarzhan Kalmurzayeva	Kazakhstan	78.88	59.28	78.88		
9	21	Zhanbota Aldabergenova	Kazakhstan	50.71	73.95	73.95		
10	2	Shao Qi	China	68.98	73.66	73.66		
11	19	Emma Weiß	Germany	68.90	73.24	73.24		
12	22	Morgan Northrop	United States	54.18	54.63	54.63		
