= FIS Freestyle Ski and Snowboarding World Championships 2021 – Women's aerials =

Women's aerials at the FIS Freestyle Ski and Snowboarding World Championships 2021
- Venue: Shymbulak
- Location: Almaty, Kazakhstan
- Date: 10 March
- Competitors: 22 from 10 nations
- Winning points: 106.46

Medalists
gold medal	Laura Peel	Australia
silver medal	Ashley Caldwell	United States
bronze medal	Liubov Nikitina

The Women's aerials competition at the FIS Freestyle Ski and Snowboarding World Championships 2021 was held on 10 March 2021.

== Qualification ==
The qualification was started at 09:40. The twelve best skiers qualified for the final.

Rank	Bib	Start order	Name	Country	Q1	Q2	Notes
1	15	6	Danielle Scott	Australia	93.76		Q
2	8	8	Liubov Nikitina	Russian Ski Federation	92.35		Q
3	1	16	Laura Peel	Australia	89.53		Q
4	7	20	Marion Thénault	Canada	86.71		Q
5	4	22	Ashley Caldwell	United States	85.30		Q
6	28	2	Olga Polyuk	Ukraine	83.47		Q
7	6	10	Emma Weiß	Germany	56.26	82.21	Q
8	13	23	Megan Smallhouse	United States	74.24	81.90	Q
9	27	11	Anastasiya Novosad	Ukraine	52.87	81.90	Q
10	14	18	Zhanbota Aldabergenova	Kazakhstan	81.27	63.81	Q
11	21	12	Akmarzhan Kalmurzayeva	Kazakhstan	80.91	67.41	Q
12	10	9	Hanna Huskova	Belarus	80.04	80.01	Q
13	25	4	Alexandra Bär	Switzerland	77.14	77.80	
14	30	15	Marzhan Akzhigit	Kazakhstan	62.06	77.49	
15	29	1	Gabi Ash	Australia	77.14	74.97	
16	11	21	Carol Bouvard	Switzerland	74.34	76.85	
17	9	7	Anastasiia Prytkova	Russian Ski Federation	75.69	61.11	
18	26	13	Naomy Boudreau-Guertin	Canada	67.04	74.82	
19	20	14	Nadiya Mokhnatska	Ukraine	67.28	72.45	
20	22	17	Eseniia Pantiukhova	Russian Ski Federation	72.10	64.67	
21	17	19	Dani Loeb	United States	55.39	68.98	
22	16	5	Iori Usui	Japan	61.48	62.14	
—	2	3	Winter Vinecki	United States	Did not start		
—	24	24	Ayana Zholdas	Kazakhstan	Did not start		

== Final ==
The final was started at 15:00.

Rank	Bib	Name	Country	Final 1			Final 2
Rank	Bib	Name	Country	Jump 1	Jump 2	Best	Final 2
1st place, gold medalist(s)	1	Laura Peel	Australia	84.21	90.63	90.63	106.46
2nd place, silver medalist(s)	4	Ashley Caldwell	United States	71.29	103.89	103.89	101.74
3rd place, bronze medalist(s)	8	Liubov Nikitina	Russian Ski Federation	81.78	84.95	84.95	94.47
4	15	Danielle Scott	Australia	92.61	97.20	97.20	82.68
5	10	Hanna Huskova	Belarus	85.05	DNS	85.05	79.69
6	7	Marion Thénault	Canada	86.01	62.74	86.01	49.70
7	13	Megan Smallhouse	United States	82.21	77.14	82.21	—
8	14	Zhanbota Aldabergenova	Kazakhstan	81.36	57.96	81.36	—
9	21	Akmarzhan Kalmurzayeva	Kazakhstan	40.63	80.91	80.91	—
10	28	Olga Polyuk	Ukraine	76.86	70.47	76.86	—
11	6	Emma Weiß	Germany	75.91	73.08	75.91	—
12	27	Anastasiya Novosad	Ukraine	56.75	55.44	56.75	—
