= FIS Freestyle Ski and Snowboarding World Championships 2015 – Women's aerials =

The women's aerials competition of the FIS Freestyle Ski and Snowboarding World Championships 2015 was held at Kreischberg, Austria on January 14 (qualifying) and January 15th (finals). 20 athletes from 9 countries competed.

== Qualification ==
The following are the results of the qualification.

Rank	Bib	Name	Country	Q1	Q2	Notes
1	4	Danielle Scott	Australia	96.23		Q
2	11	Laura Peel	Australia	92.70		Q
3	1	Xu Mengtao	China	91.29		Q
4	2	Kiley McKinnon	United States	87.42		Q
5	6	Quan Huilin	China	84.42		Q
6	7	Xu Sicun	China	84.42		Q
7	5	Ashley Caldwell	United States	79.78	100.20	Q
8	12	Aliaksandra Ramanouskaya	Belarus	84.10	74.82	Q
9	14	Liubov Nikitina	Russia	67.32	81.58	Q
10	9	Hanna Huskova	Belarus	80.64	27.84	Q
11	18	Anastasiya Novosad	Ukraine	80.32	54.28	Q
12	15	Veronika Korsunova	Russia	80.01	70.18	Q
13	13	Renee McEldoff	Australia	79.69	77.72	
14	3	Kong Fanyu	China	77.14	79.45	
15	10	Olga Polyuk	Ukraine	78.75	67.57	
16	8	Shen Xiaoxue	China	78.12	70.50	
17	17	Sabrina Guerin	Canada	78.12	70.47	
18	20	Zhanbota Aldabergenova	Kazakhstan	75.40	53.55	
19	16	Nadiya Mokhnatska	Ukraine	68.89	42.84	
20	19	Elodie Wallace	United Kingdom	51.66	48.60	

== Final ==
The following are the results of the finals.

Rank	Bib	Name	Country	Final 1	Final 2	Final 3
1st place, gold medalist(s)	11	Laura Peel	Australia	80.95	86.01	88.47
2nd place, silver medalist(s)	2	Kiley McKinnon	United States	85.36	77.14	88.12
3rd place, bronze medalist(s)	1	Xu Mengtao	China	98.00	96.90	86.84
4	5	Ashley Caldwell	United States	89.30	68.47	79.78
5	4	Danielle Scott	Australia	82.21	88.83	70.14
6	9	Hanna Huskova	Belarus	82.84	78.30	69.09
7	14	Liubov Nikitina	Russia	83.47	65.56	
8	7	Xu Sicun	China	80.50	59.50	
9	6	Quan Huilin	China	85.05	35.25	
10	18	Anastasiya Novosad	Ukraine	78.12		
11	12	Aliaksandra Ramanouskaya	Belarus	71.82		
12	15	Veronika Korsunova	Russia	64.26		
