= Nadiya Mokhnatska =

Ukrainian freestyle skier

Personal information
- Born: October 18, 1995 (age 30) Ivano-Frankivsk, Ukraine

Sport
- Sport: Skiing

World Cup career
- Indiv. podiums: 1
- Indiv. wins: 1
- Updated on December 26, 2025

Nadiya Mokhnatska (born October 18, 1995) is a Ukrainian retired freestyle skier, specializing in aerials. Mokhnatska competed at the 2014 Winter Olympics for Ukraine, finishing 17th.

Mokhnatska made her World Cup debut in January 2013. She ended her competitive career at the beginning of the 2021–22 season. She has won one World Cup competition.

== Career results ==
=== Winter Olympics ===
Year	Place	Aerials	Team event
2014	Sochi, Russia	17	—N/a

=== World Championships ===
Year	Place	Aerials	Team event
2013	Voss, Norway	21	—N/a
2015	Kreischberg, Austria	19	—N/a
2021	Shymbulak, Kazakhstan	19	—

=== World Cup ===
==== Individual podiums ====
Season	Place	Rank
2019–20	Almaty, Kazakhstan	1

==== Positions ====
Season	Aerials	Overall
2012—13	20	89
2013—14	28	132
2014—15	22	81
2015—16	25	111
2016—17	Missed	
2017—18	Missed	
2018—19	Missed	
2019—20	11	54
2020—21	19	—N/a

=== European Cup ===
==== Individual podiums ====
Season	Place	Rank
2011–12	Bukovel, Ukraine	3
2011–12	Raubichi, Belarus	3
2013–14	Chiesa in Valmalenco, Italy	2
2019–20	Bukovel, Ukraine	2
2019–20	Bukovel, Ukraine	2

=== World Junior Championships ===
Level	Year	Aerials
2012	Chiesa in Valmalenco, Italy	9
2013	Chiesa in Valmalenco, Italy	4
2014	Chiesa in Valmalenco, Italy	14
2015	Chiesa in Valmalenco, Italy	8
