= Anastasiya Novosad =

Ukrainian freestyle skier (born 1993)

Personal information
- Born: May 8, 1993 Rivne, Ukraine

Sport
- Sport: Skiing

World Cup career
- Indiv. podiums: 3
- Indiv. wins: 1
Medal record
Women's freestyle skiing
Representing Ukraine
World Championships
Bronze medal – third place	2023 Bakuriani	Aerials
Bronze medal – third place	2023 Bakuriani	Mixed team aerials
Junior World Championships
Silver medal – second place	2013 Chiesa in Valmalenco	Aerials
- Updated on 3 January 2026

Anastasiya Novosad (Ukrainian: Новосад Анастасія Юріївна; born 8 May 1993) is a Ukrainian retired freestyle skier, specializing in aerials. She represented Ukraine at the 2014 and 2022 Winter Olympics. She is 2023 World Championships medallist in both individual and team events.

== Career ==
Novosad started her international career in 2010 when she debuted at the European Cup and finished 6th in Minsk. She competed at two Junior World Championships, finishing 7th in 2012 and winning a silver medal in 2013.

Novosad made her World Cup debut on January 15, 2012, in Mont Garibel, Canada, where she finished 12th. Her first victory, which was also her first individual World Cup podium, came on December 10, 2021, in Ruka, Finland. It was also the first World Cup event when two Ukrainian female athletes finished in Top-3 (Olha Polyuk was 3rd).

Novosad competed at the 2014 Winter Olympics for Ukraine, finishing 16th.

She missed two seasons (2017–18 and 2018–19) because of pregnancy, so she was not able to qualify for the 2018 Winter Olympics. She successfully returned at the beginning of the 2019-20 season, finishing 3rd at the European Cup stage.

In 2022, Anastasiya Novosad was nominated for her second Winter Games in Beijing. However, she was barred from competitions due to positive COVID-19 tests.

The 2022–23 season was quite successful for Novosad: she reached two podium places and won two medals at the World Championships. She was designated by the Ukrainian NOC as the best athlete of February 2023.

In January 2025, it was announced that Novosad retired from competitive sports.

== Career results ==
=== Winter Olympics ===
Year	Place	Aerials	Team event
2014	Sochi, Russia	16	—N/a
2022	Beijing, China	DNS	—

=== World Championships ===
Year	Place	Aerials	Team event
2013	Voss, Norway	DNS	—N/a
2015	Kreischberg, Austria	10	—N/a
2017	Sierra Nevada, Spain	13	—N/a
2021	Shymbulak, Kazakhstan	12	5
2023	(Georgia (country)) Bakuriani, Georgia	3	3

=== World Cup ===
==== Individual podiums ====
Season	Place	Rank
2021–22	Ruka, Finland	1
2022–23	Le Relais, Canada	3
2022–23	Le Relais, Canada	3

==== Team podiums ====
Season	Place	Rank
2021–22	Ruka, Finland	3
2021–22	Ruka, Finland	3

==== Individual rankings ====
Season	Aerials	Overall
2011–12	20	105
2012–13	14	71
2013–14	21	103
2014–15	15	52
2015–16	24	107
2016–17	24	118
2017–18	missed	
2018–19	missed	
2019–20	22	99
2020–21	28	—N/a
2021–22	5	—N/a
2022–23	7	—N/a

=== European Cup ===
==== Individual podiums ====
Season	Place	Rank
2009–10	Bukovel, Ukraine	3
2010–11	Minsk, Belarus	2
2010–11	Minsk, Belarus	2
2012–13	Valmalenco, Italy	3
2012–13	Valmalenco, Italy	1
2013–14	Ruka, Finland	1
2019–20	Ruka, Finland	3
2019–20	Bukovel, Ukraine	1
2020–21	Ruka, Finland	2
2020–21	Airolo, Switzerland	3
