= Olha Polyuk =

Ukrainian freestyle skier

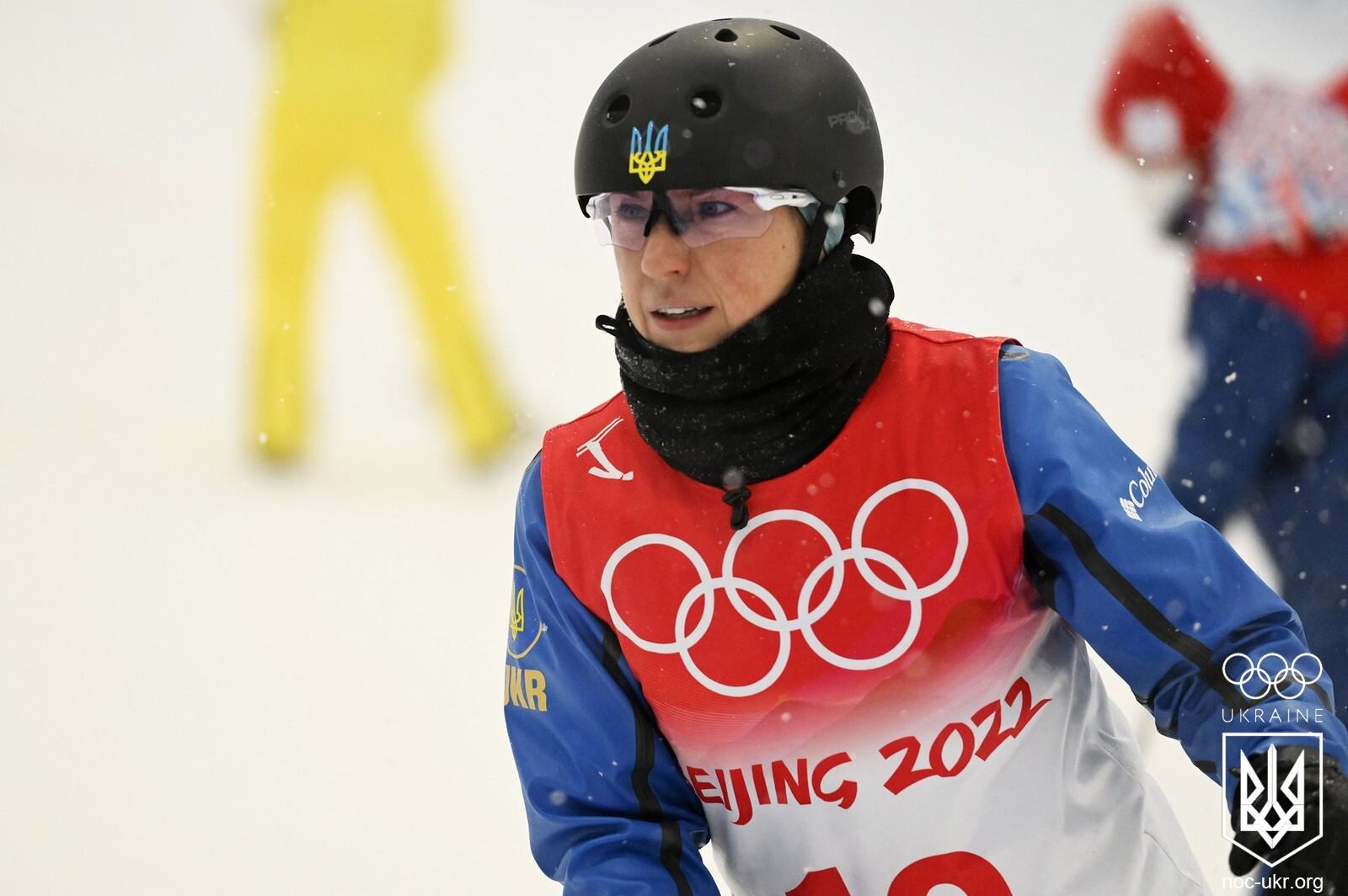

Personal information
- Born: September 15, 1987 (age 38) Khmelnytskyi, Ukrainian SSR

Sport
- Sport: Skiing

World Cup career
- Indiv. podiums: 1
Medal record
Women's Freestyle skiing
Representing Ukraine
Junior World Championships
Bronze medal – third place	2006 Krasnoe Ozero	Aerials
Bronze medal – third place	2007 Airolo	Aerials
- Updated on January 26, 2022

Olha Yuryivna Polyuk (Ukrainian: Ольга Юріївна Полюк; born September 15, 1987, in Khmelnytskyi) is a Ukrainian retired freestyle skier, specializing in aerials. She competed at the 2010, 2014, 2018, and 2022 Winter Olympics.

== Career ==
Polyuk started her international career on February 11, 2006, when she debuted at the European Cup and finished 4th in Minsk. The next day, she achieved the podium at the European Cup in Minsk, finishing 2nd. She competed at two Junior World Championships (in 2006 and 2007), winning bronze medals at both of them.

Polyuk made her World Cup debut on February 25, 2007, in Apex, Canada, where she finished 13th. Her first World Cup podium came during the 2021–22 season on December 10, 2021, in Ruka, Finland. It was also the first World Cup event when two Ukrainian female athletes finished in Top-3 (Anastasiya Novosad was the winner). Her last World Cup start was on 19 March 2023 in Almaty where she finished 15th.

She competed at nine World Championships between 2007 and 2023. As after the 2023 event, her best World Championships result was 7th in 2019.

Polyuk competed at the 2010 Winter Olympics for Ukraine. She placed 20th in the qualifying round of the aerials, failing to advance to the final.

Then she also competed at the 2014 Winter Olympics for Ukraine. She placed 15th in the qualifying round of the aerials, failing to advance to the final again.

Polyuk was the only Ukrainian in the women's aerials event at the 2018 Winter Olympics. She finished 16th.

In 2022, Olha Polyuk was nominated for her fourth Winter Games in Beijing. Her performance was quite poor and she finished 22nd.

== Career results ==
=== Winter Olympics ===
Year	Place	Aerials	Team event
2010	Vancouver, Canada	20	—N/a
2014	Sochi, Russia	15	—N/a
2018	Pyeongchang, South Korea	16	—N/a
2022	Beijing, China	22	—

=== World Championships ===
Year	Place	Aerials	Team event
2007	Madonna di Campiglio, Italy	17	—N/a
2009	Inawashiro, Japan	17	—N/a
2011	Deer Valley, United States	8	—N/a
2013	Voss, Norway	16	—N/a
2015	Kreischberg, Austria	15	—N/a
2017	Sierra Nevada, Spain	15	—N/a
2019	Utah, United States	7	—
2021	Shymbulak, Kazakhstan	10	—
2023	(Georgia (country)) Bakuriani, Georgia	9	—

=== World Cup ===
==== Individual podiums ====
Season	Place	Rank
2021–22	Ruka, Finland	3

==== Individual rankings ====
Season	Aerials	Overall
2006–07	20	88
2007–08	20	62
2008–09	13	36
2009–10	21	59
2010–11	10	35
2011–12	10	32
2012–13	13	69
2013–14	24	118
2014–15	11	40
2015–16	17	78
2016–17	15	77
2017–18	19	82
2018–19	8	39
2019–20	missed	
2020–21	22	—N/a
2021–22	10	—N/a
2022–23	9	—N/a

=== European Cup ===
==== Individual podiums ====
Season	Place	Rank
2005–06	Minsk, Belarus	2
2009–10	Bukovel, Ukraine	2
2010–11	Ruka, Finland	3
2010–11	Bukovel, Ukraine	2
2010–11	Bukovel, Ukraine	1
2011–12	Bukovel, Ukraine	2
2012–13	Ruka, Finland	2
2012–13	Ruka, Finland	3
2015–16	Ruka, Finland	2
2015–16	Ruka, Finland	3
2016–17	Airolo, Switzerland	2
2016–17	Airolo, Switzerland	2

==== Team podiums ====
Season	Place	Rank
2016–17	Airolo, Switzerland	3

=== Nor-Am Cup ===
==== Individual podiums ====
Season	Place	Rank
2008–09	Mont Garibel, Canada	1
2018–19	Utah, United States	1
2018–19	Utah, United States	2
