= Megan Nick =

American freestyle skier

Personal information
- Nationality: American
- Born: July 9, 1996 (age 29) Shelburne, Vermont, U.S.

Sport
- Country: United States
- Sport: Freestyle skiing
- Event: Aerials
Medal record
Women's freestyle skiing
Representing United States
Olympic Games
Bronze medal – third place	2022 Beijing	Aerials

Megan Nick (born July 9, 1996) is an American freestyle skier specializing in aerials. She competed at the 2022 Winter Olympics in Beijing, where she won the bronze medal in aerials.

Nick went through the qualification, and in Final 1, where only six athletes qualify for Final 2, she was fifth. In Final 2, her routine was easier than that of the other athletes; in particular, she was the only athlete who did not perform a triple backflip, but she did not make mistakes, whereas many of her competitors did with their landing. NBC Sports called her a "surprising medalist".

After the 2022 Olympics, she retired from competitions.

== Personal life ==
Nick attended high school at Champlain Valley Union High School. She grew up competing in gymnastics before transitioning into aerials after attending the U.S. team’s aerial skiing Talent ID camp in Lake Placid during her final year of high school.
