= Megan Smallhouse =

American freestyle skier

Personal information
- Born: January 16, 2001 (age 24); Reno, Nevada

Sport
- Country: United States
- Sport: Freestyle skiing
- Event: Aerials

Megan Smallhouse (born January 16, 2001) is an American freestyle skier who competes internationally.

She competed in the FIS Freestyle Ski and Snowboarding World Championships 2021, where she placed seventh in women's aerials.
