= Gabi Ash =

Australian freestyle skier (born 1998)

Personal information
- Full name: Gabrielle Ash
- Nationality: Australia
- Born: 4 November 1998 (age 27) Randwick, New South Wales, Australia

Sport
- Sport: Skiing

World Cup career
- Seasons: 4 (2019–2022)
- Indiv. starts: 10
- Discipline titles: 0 – (18th in AE 2022)
- Updated on 26 May 2023

Gabrielle Ash (born 4 November 1998) is an Australian freestyle skier, who competes in the aerials discipline. She competed at the 2022 Winter Olympics in the women's aerials event, but she didn't qualify to final. Her sister Sophie also freestyle skier, they was the first Australian siblings who compete together same Winter Olympics.

== Career ==
She competed at the 2021 World Championships, where she placed fifteenth in the women's aerials qualification, and didn't reach the final.

== World Championships results ==
Year	Age	Aerials	Aerials team
(Kazakhstan) 2021 Almaty	22	15	—

== Olympic results ==
Year	Age	Aerials	Aerials team
(China) 2022 Beijing	23	14	—
