= Laura Peel =

Australian freestyle skier (born 1989)

Personal information
- Born: 29 September 1989 (age 36) Canberra, Australia
- Height: 1.74 m (5 ft 9 in)

Sport
- Country: Australia
- Sport: Freestyle skiing
- Event: Aerials

World Cup career
- Seasons: 15 (2011-2015, 2017-2026)
- Indiv. starts: 85
- Indiv. podiums: 29
- Indiv. wins: 15
- Team starts: 4
- Team podiums: 1
- Discipline titles: 3 – AE (2020, 2021, 2025)
Medal record
Women's freestyle skiing
Representing Australia
World Championships
Gold medal – first place	2015 Kreischberg	Aerials
Gold medal – first place	2021 Almaty	Aerials
- Updated on 11 Feb 2026

Laura Peel (born 29 September 1989) is an Australian freestyle skier. She is a two time World Champion (2015, 2021) and has won three World Cup titles (2020, 2021, 2025) in the women's aerials discipline. She competed at the 2014, 2018, and 2022 Winter Olympics, where she placed seventh, fifth and fifth respectively. She qualified to appear at her fourth consecutive Winter Olympic Games in 2026, before withdrawing due to injury.

She competed at the FIS Freestyle World Ski Championships 2011 in Utah, and at the FIS Freestyle World Ski Championships 2013 in Voss. At the 2015 World Championships she won her first world title.

== Results ==
=== Olympic results ===
As of 8 March 2026

Year	Age	Aerials	Aerials team
(Russia) 2014 Sochi	24	7	—N/a
(South Korea) 2018 Pyeongchang	28	5	—N/a
(China) 2022 Beijing	32	5	—

==== Notes ====
- The Aerials team was added as an event in 2022.

=== World Championships ===
As of 8 March 2026

Year	Age	Aerials	Aerials team
(United States) 2011 Deer Valley	21	11	—N/a
(Norway) 2013 Voss	23	8	—N/a
(Austria) 2015 Kreischberg	25	1	—N/a
(Spain) 2017 Sierra Nevada	27	8	—N/a
(United States) 2019 Deer Valley	29	4	7
(Kazakhstan) 2021 Almaty	31	1	—
(Georgia (country)) 2023 Bakuriani	33	7	—
(Switzerland) 2025 Engadin	35	7	4

==== Notes ====
- The Aerials team was added as an event in 2019.

=== World Cup ===
==== Race podiums ====
No.	Season				
No.	Season	Date	Location	Discipline	Place
1	2012	15 January 2012	Mont Gabriel, Canada	Aerials	3rd
2	2012	17 February 2012	Kreischberg, Austria	Aerials	1st
3	2013	1 February 2013	Deer Valley, United States	Aerials	2nd
4	2013	17 February 2013	Sochi, Russia	Aerials	2nd
5	2017	4 March 2017	Moscow, Russia	Aerials	3rd
6	2018	19 January 2018	Lake Placid, United States	Aerials	3rd
7	2018	20 January 2018	Lake Placid, United States	Aerials	3rd
8	2019	16 February 2019	Moscow, Russia	Aerials	2nd
9	2019	2 March 2019	Shimao Lotus Mountain, China	Aerials	1st
10	2020	21 December 2019	Shimao Lotus Mountain, China	Aerials	3rd
11	2020	15 February 2020	Moscow, Russia	Aerials	2nd
12	2020	22 February 2020	Minsk, Belarus	Aerials	1st
13	2020	8 March 2020	Krasnoyarsk, Russia	Aerials	1st
14	2021	4 December 2020	Ruka, Finland	Aerials	1st
15	2021	16 January 2021	Yaroslavl, Russia	Aerials	1st
16	2021	23 January 2021	Moscow, Russia	Aerials	2nd
17	2021	30 January 2021	Minsk, Belarus	Aerials	2nd
18	2022	11 December 2021	Ruka, Finland	Aerials	2nd
19	2022	12 January 2022	Deer Valley, United States	Aerials	1st
20	2023	22 January 2023	Le Relais, Canada	Aerials	1st
21	2023	5 March 2023	Engadin, Switzerland	Aerials	2nd
22	2023	19 March 2023	Almaty, Kazakhstan	Aerials	1st
23	2024	16 December 2023	Shimao Lotus Mountain, China	Aerials	3rd
24	2025	19 January 2025	Lake Placid, United States	Aerials Team	3rd
25	2025	25 January 2025	Lac-Beauport, Canada	Aerials	1st
26	2025	26 January 2025	Lac-Beauport, Canada	Aerials	1st
27	2025	7 February 2025	Deer Valley, United States	Aerials	1st
28	2025	2 March 2025	Almaty, Kazakhstan	Aerials	1st
29	2025	13 March 2025	Livigno, Italy	Aerials	1st
30	2026	7 January 2026	Lac-Beauport, Canada	Aerials	1st

== Recognition ==
- Canberra Sports Awards - Athlete of the Year - Women's Sport: 2020, 2021, 2025.
