= Joselane Santos =

Gymnast and freestyle skier

Personal information
- Born: July 14, 1984 (age 41) São Paulo, Brazil
- Height: 5 ft 1 in (155 cm)
- Weight: 110 lb (50 kg)

Sport
- Country: Brazil
- Sport: Freestyle skiing
Medal record
Representing Brazil
Women's artistic gymnastics
South American Games
Gold medal – first place	1998 Cuenca	Team

Joselane "Josi" Santos (born 14 July 1984) is a Brazilian gymnast and freestyle skier.

Originally a gymnast competing at an international level for Brazil, she started freestyle skiing in 2013 and qualified for the FIS Freestyle Skiing World Cup.

In the women's aerials at the 2014 Winter Olympics in Sochi, Santos finished last at 22nd place. She dedicated her performance to Laís Souza whom she replaced after Souza was gravely hurt while training in Utah in January 2014.
