= Alla Tsuper =

Ukrainian and Belarusian aerial skier

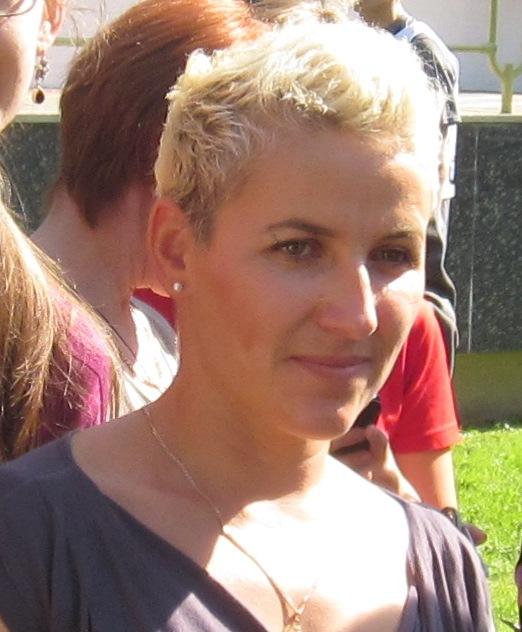
- Alla Tsuper in 2014

Personal information
- Born: 16 April 1979 (age 47) Rivne, Ukrainian SSR, Soviet Union
- Height: 1.53 m (5 ft 0 in)
- Weight: 53 kg (117 lb)

Sport
- Sport: Freestyle skiing
- Club: RTsFVS Homel; RTsFVS Minsk
Medal record
Representing Belarus
Olympic Games
Gold medal – first place	2014 Sochi	Aerials

Alla Petrovna Tsuper (Belarusian: Ала Пятроўна Цупeр; Ukrainian: Алла Петрівна Цупер; Russian: Алла Петровна Цупер; born 16 April 1979) is a Ukrainian (until 2000) and Belarusian (since 2000) aerial skier.

== Career ==
She was 5th at the 1998 Winter Olympics (representing Ukraine), 9th at the 2002 Winter Olympics, 10th at the 2006 Winter Olympics, and 8th at the 2010 Winter Olympics after reaching the finals of the event by coming first in the qualifying round. At the 2014 Winter Olympics, she finally became the Olympic champion by performing a fairly well executed back full-full-full (three backflips with three twists) while in the super final.

After the 2010 Winter Olympics, Tsuper retired from freestyle skiing and had a baby. She returned to competitive freestyle skiing two years later.

In Final 2 of the 2014 Olympics, Tsuper finished in the last qualifying position, 0.03 point ahead of the next athlete. In the super final, she flawlessly demonstrated a new jump, whereas all three other competitors fell. Tsuper was trained by Nikolay Kozeko, who, in particular, convinced her to return to competitions in 2012.
