= Cheng Shuang =

Chinese aerial skier (born 1987)

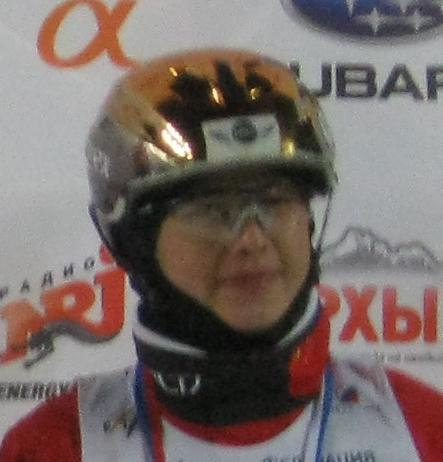

Medal record

Women's freestyle skiing

Representing China

World Championships
Gold medal – first place	2011 Deer Valley	Aerials

Cheng Shuang (Chinese: 程爽; born February 11, 1987) is a Chinese female aerial skier who has competed at the 2010 Winter Olympics and the 2014 Winter Olympics.

Cheng won the gold medal in the women's aerials event at the 2011 FIS Freestyle World Ski Championships.
