= Aliaksandra Ramanouskaya =

Belarusian freestyle skier

Personal information
- Nationality: Belarusian
- Born: 22 August 1996 (age 29)

Sport
- Country: Belarus
- Sport: Freestyle skiing
- Event: Aerials
Medal record
Representing Belarus
World Championships
Gold medal – first place	2019 Utah	Aerials
Winter Universiade
Gold medal – first place	2019 Krasnoyarsk	Aerials
Gold medal – first place	2019 Krasnoyarsk	Team aerials

Aliaksandra Ramanouskaya (born 22 August 1996) is a Belarusian freestyle skier.

== Sports career ==
Ramanouskaya was born on August 22, 1996, in Minsk. Graduated from the BSPU. In 2005 she started skiing.

Ramanouskaya competed in the 2018 Winter Olympics.

She participated at the FIS Freestyle Ski and Snowboarding World Championships 2019, winning a medal. She is also the double gold medalist of the 2019 Winter Universiade in Krasnoyarsk, Russia, in jumps and in team acrobatics. She was chosen Sportswoman of the Year in 2019 in Belarus.

== Pressure for political views ==
Ramanouskaya actively voiced her civil position during the protests, she signed an open letter of protests against the 2020 presidential election, demanding the authorities to stop the violence and re-run the elections. She also joined Belarusian Sport Solidarity Foundation(BSSF) and voiced support to all the sportsmen who suffered the crackdown for their political views.

On October 6, 2020, her coach was notified that Ramanouskaya had been fired from the national team for the official reason of truancy. In November 2020 she sold her gold medal and donated the money to the BSSF.

Ramanouskaya was detained by the police on November 10, 2021. The authorities didn't give any information about reasons of the arrest, the police spokesman only disclosed that she was facing administrative charges. The Belarusian Sport Solidarity Foundation publicly announced that the detainment must be regarded to Ramanouskaya's criticism of Belarus President Alexander Lukashenko. She was later released with a fine of more than €1,000.
