= Samantha Wells =

Australian freestyle skier

Samantha Wells (born 2 August 1989) is an Australian freestyle skier. She competed at the FIS Freestyle World Ski Championships 2013 in Voss, and at the 2014 Winter Olympics in Sochi, in women's aerials.

Wells retired after the 2018 Pyeongchang Winter Olympics after a strong performance.
