= Winter Vinecki =

American freestyle skier and athlete (born 1998)

Personal information
- Full name: Winter Lee Vinecki
- Born: December 18, 1998 (age 27)

Sport
- Sport: Skiing

Winter Lee Vinecki (born December 18, 1998) is an American marathon runner, triathlete, and aerial skier. She represented the United States in aerial skiing at the 2022 and 2026 Winter Olympics.

== Biography ==
Vinecki ran a marathon in Antarctica on March 30, 2013, when she finished the Antarctica Marathon with a time of 4 hours, 49 minutes, and 45 seconds, giving her third place in the women's race. In November 2013, she completed a marathon in Athens, Greece, which made her the youngest person to complete a marathon on seven continents, as she had done so on the other six continents previously. However, on September 6, 2014, Vinecki's record as the youngest person to run a marathon on all seven continents was broken. She ran these marathons with her mother, Dawn Estelle, and the two are the first mother-daughter pair to complete seven marathons on seven continents. The marathons were in the United States, Kenya, Antarctica, Mongolia, Peru, New Zealand, and Greece. At the Andes Adventures Inca Trail Marathon to Machu Picchu in Peru, Vinecki was the women's overall winner and set the women's course record.

She was the national IronKids triathlon champion in 2010 and 2011 and finished in 2012 as an official ambassador for IronKids.

After meeting Emily Cook in 2011, Vinecki started training in aerial skiing. She lives with a host family in Park City, Utah, training at Utah Olympic Park, while her family lives in Salem, Oregon. She qualified for the 2013 FIS Junior World Ski Championships but was unable to attend due to scheduling. In March 2014, she was named as part of the U.S. Freestyle Junior Worlds Team. The 2014 FIS Junior World Ski Championships were held later that month in Chiesa in Valmalenco, Italy. Vinecki placed fifth in ladies' aerials with a total of 162 points. She had a goal to compete in the 2018 Winter Olympics.

At age nine, Vinecki created a nonprofit organization, Team Winter, which raises money to fight prostate cancer, which her father died from. As of November 2013, the organization has raised over $400,000. In 2011, Vinecki was the recipient of the ANNIKA Inspiration Award.

In August 2017, Vinecki received the Athletes in Excellence Award from The Foundation for Global Sports Development in recognition of her community service efforts and work with youth.

In 2024 and 2026, Vinecki won the Lac-Beauport FIS World Cup's women’s aerials ski competition.
