= Naomy Boudreau-Guertin =

Canadian freestyle skier

Personal information
- Born: 21 September 1999 (age 26) Quebec City, Quebec, Canada

Sport
- Country: Canada
- Sport: Freestyle skiing
- Event: Aerials

Naomy Boudreau-Guertin (born 21 September 1999) is a Canadian freestyle skier who competes internationally in the aerials discipline.

== Career ==
Boudreau-Guertin joined the national team in 2021. Boudreau-Guertin had an eighth-place finish at the Deer Valley stop of the World Cup, the last stop before the 2022 Winter Olympics.

On January 24, 2022, Boudreau-Guertin was named to Canada's 2022 Olympic team.
