= Tanja Schärer =

Swiss freestyle skier

Personal information
- Born: 17 June 1989 (age 37) Schlieren, Switzerland

Sport
- Sport: Skiing

World Cup career
- Indiv. podiums: 3
- Updated on 24 July 2013

Tanja Schärer (born 17 June 1989 in Schlieren) is a Swiss freestyle skier, specializing in aerials. She began practicing skiing acrobatics in 2002 at the age of 13. In winter 2004/2005 she joined the Europacup for the first time. In her youth, Tanja Schärer had experience in gymnastics and found aerial skiing to be a natural progression from the movements and skills required for gymnastics.

Schärer competed at the 2010 Winter Olympics for Switzerland. She placed 19th in the qualifying round of the aerials, failing to advance to the final.

As of April 2013, her best showing at the World Championships is 7th, in 2013.

In 2009 and 2010, the Urdorf native was voted "Limmattaler Sports Star of the Year".

Schärer made her World Cup debut in March 2008. As of April 2013, she has three World Cup podium finish, with her best finish a silver at Minsk in 2011/12. Her best World Cup overall finish in aerials is 5th, in 2011/12. Schärer retired from freestyle skiing in November of 2016 at the age of 27. She began working as a medical clinic assistant and continues to ski in her free time for fun.

== World Cup podiums ==
	Date	Location	Rank	Event
25 February 2012	Minsk	2nd place, silver medalist(s)	Aerials	
17 February 2013	Sochi	3rd place, bronze medalist(s)	Aerials	
23 February 2013	Bukovel	3rd place, bronze medalist(s)	Aerials	
