= Zhibek Arapbayeva =

Kazakh freestyle skier (born 1991)

Personal information
- Born: December 8, 1991 (age 34) Shymkent, Kazakh SSR

Sport
- Sport: Skiing
- Updated on July 24, 2013

Zhibek Arapbayeva (born December 8, 1991, in Shymkent) is a Kazakh freestyle skier, specializing in aerials .

Arapbayeva competed at the 2010 Winter Olympics for Kazakhstan. She placed 23rd in the qualifying round of the aerials, failing to advance to the final.

As of April 2013, her best showing at the World Championships is 18th, in 2013.

Arapbayeva made her World Cup debut in December 2008. As of April 2013, her best finish at a World Cup event is 8th, at Bukovel in 2012/13. Her best World Cup overall finish in aerials is 24th, in 2012/13.
