= Emma Weiß =

German freestyle skier (born 2000)

Personal information
- Born: 22 January 2000 (age 26) Albstadt, Germany

Sport
- Country: Germany
- Sport: Freestyle skiing
- Event: Aerials
- Club: Freestyle Club Zollernalb

Emma Weiß (also spelled Weiss; born 22 January 2000) is a German freestyle skier who competes internationally. She represented Germany at the 2022 and 2026 Winter Olympics.

She competed in the FIS Freestyle Ski and Snowboarding World Championships 2021, where she placed eleventh in women's aerials.
