= Kong Fanyu =

Chinese freestyle skier (born 1993)

Personal information
- Born: 6 June 1993 (age 33) Anshan, Liaoning, China

Sport
- Country: China
- Sport: Freestyle skiing
- Event: Aerials
Medal record
Women's freestyle skiing
Representing China
Olympic Games
Bronze medal – third place	2018 PyeongChang	Aerials
World Championships
Gold medal – first place	2023 Bakuriani	Aerials
Silver medal – second place	2023 Bakuriani	Mixed team aerials

Kong Fanyu
- Simplified Chinese: 孔凡钰
- Traditional Chinese: 孔凡鈺
Transcriptions
Standard Mandarin
- Hanyu Pinyin: Kǒng Fányù
- IPA: [kʰʊ̀ŋ fǎn ŷ]

Kong Fanyu (Chinese: 孔凡钰; pinyin: Kǒng Fányù; Mandarin pronunciation: [kʰʊ̀ŋ fǎn ŷ]}; born 6 June 1993) is a Chinese freestyle skier who competes internationally. She participated at the 2018 Winter Olympics and won a bronze medal in aerials, and at the 2022 Winter Olympics, in Women's aerials.

She competed at the 2021–22 FIS Freestyle Ski World Cup.
