= Hanna Huskova =

Belarusian freestyle skier (born 1992)

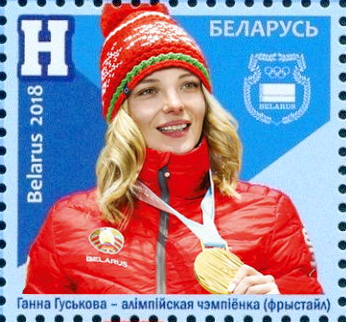
- Huskova on a 2018 stamp of Belarus

Personal information
- Nationality: Belarusian
- Born: 28 August 1992 (age 34) Minsk, Belarus
- Height: 1.67 m (5 ft 6 in)
- Weight: 57 kg (126 lb)

Sport
- Sport: Freestyle skiing
- Event: Aerials

Achievements and titles
- Highest world ranking: 2nd in Aerials World Cup (2018)
Medal record
Representing Belarus
Olympic Games
Gold medal – first place	2018 Pyeongchang	Aerials
Silver medal – second place	2022 Beijing	Aerials

Hanna Andreyevna Huskova (Note: Belarusian: Ганна Андрэеўна Гуськова, romanized: Hanna Andrejewna Huśkova, IPA: [ˈɣanːa andrɛˈjɛu̯na ˈɣusʲkova]; Russian: Анна Андреевна Гуськова, pronounced [ˈanːə əndrʲɪˈjevnə ˈɡusʲkəvə]) (born 28 August 1992) is a Belarusian freestyle skier specializing in aerials.

She competed at the FIS Freestyle Ski and Snowboarding World Championships 2015, where she qualified for the aerials final, and placed sixth in the final. At the 2014 Olympics, she placed 21st in aerials. She won a gold medal at the 2018 Olympics, and won silver at the 2022 Olympics, in Women's aerials.
