= Akmarzhan Kalmurzayeva =

Kazakhstani freestyle skier (born 1995)

Personal information
- Nationality: Kazakhstani
- Born: 25 December 1995 (age 30) Almaty, Kazakhstan
- Height: 157 cm (5 ft 2 in)
- Weight: 52 kg (115 lb)

Sport
- Sport: Freestyle skiing

Akmarzhan Kalmurzayeva (Акмаржан Калмурзаева, born 25 December 1995) is a Kazakhstani freestyle skier. She competed in the 2018 Winter Olympics.
