= Emily Cook (skier) =

American freestyle skier

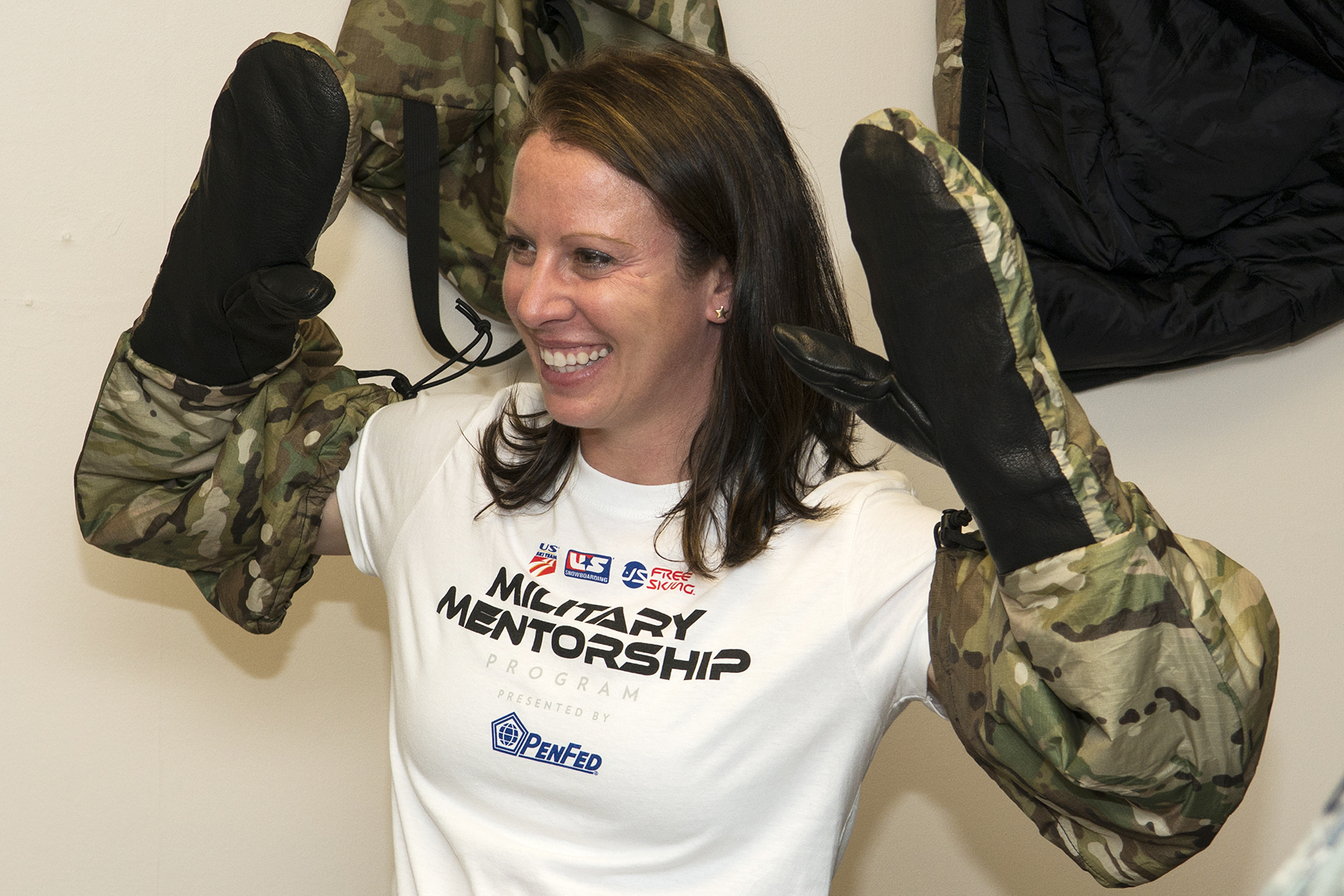
- Emily Cook tries on cold weather survival gear during a tour of Barksdale Air Force Base in 2014

Personal information
- Full name: Emily Cook
- Born: July 1, 1979 (age 46) Belmont, Massachusetts, U.S.
- Height: 5 ft 3 in (160 cm)
- Weight: 115 lb (52 kg)

Sport
- Country: United States
- Sport: Freestyle Skiing

Emily Cook (born July 1, 1979 in Belmont, Massachusetts) is an American freestyle skier who has competed since 1995. Her first World Cup victory was in an aerials event in Russia in 2008. She has eight career World Cup podiums, over thirty World Cup top tens, and five National Championships wins.

== Career ==
Cook missed the 2002 Winter Olympics in her home of Salt Lake City after breaking both feet on a jump in Lake Placid, New York, two weeks earlier.

At the 2006 Winter Olympics in Turin, Cook finished 19th in the aerials event. Her best finish at the FIS Freestyle World Ski Championships was fourth in the aerials at Inawashiro in 2009.

Cook was named to the U.S. team for the 2010 Winter Olympics in January 2010 and competed on the 2014 U.S. Olympic team in Sochi, Russia. She is coached by Todd Ossian.

=== Sochi 2014 ===
Sochi 2014 was Emily's third Olympic games. On February 14, 2014, Cook completed the Freestyle Skiing Ladies' Aerials Qualification with a score of 80.01 for 5th place and the finals with a score of 64.50 for 8th place. Her finals score went down from her qualifying score because she was unable to stick her landing. Her 8th-place finish was her best placing in her Olympic career.

== Personal life ==
Born in Belmont, Massachusetts, Emily's mother died when she was two years old. She began skiing when she was four years old and moved on to freestyle at age fourteen. She attended Belmont High School and a private skiing school in Maine, Carrabassett Valley Academy. She made the U.S. Freestyle team at age seventeen, which is when she moved to Park City, Utah. Emily attended the University of Utah.

=== Charity Work ===
Emily supports many non-profit organizations which include The Speedy Foundation, Kids Play International, Right To Play, Women's Sports Foundation, The Youth Winter Sports Alliance. She also created a mentorship program, the Visa Champions Creating Champions.

In November 2014, Cook received the Athletes in Excellence Award from The Foundation for Global Sports Development, in recognition of her community service efforts and work with youth.
