= Bukovel =

Ski resort in Ukraine

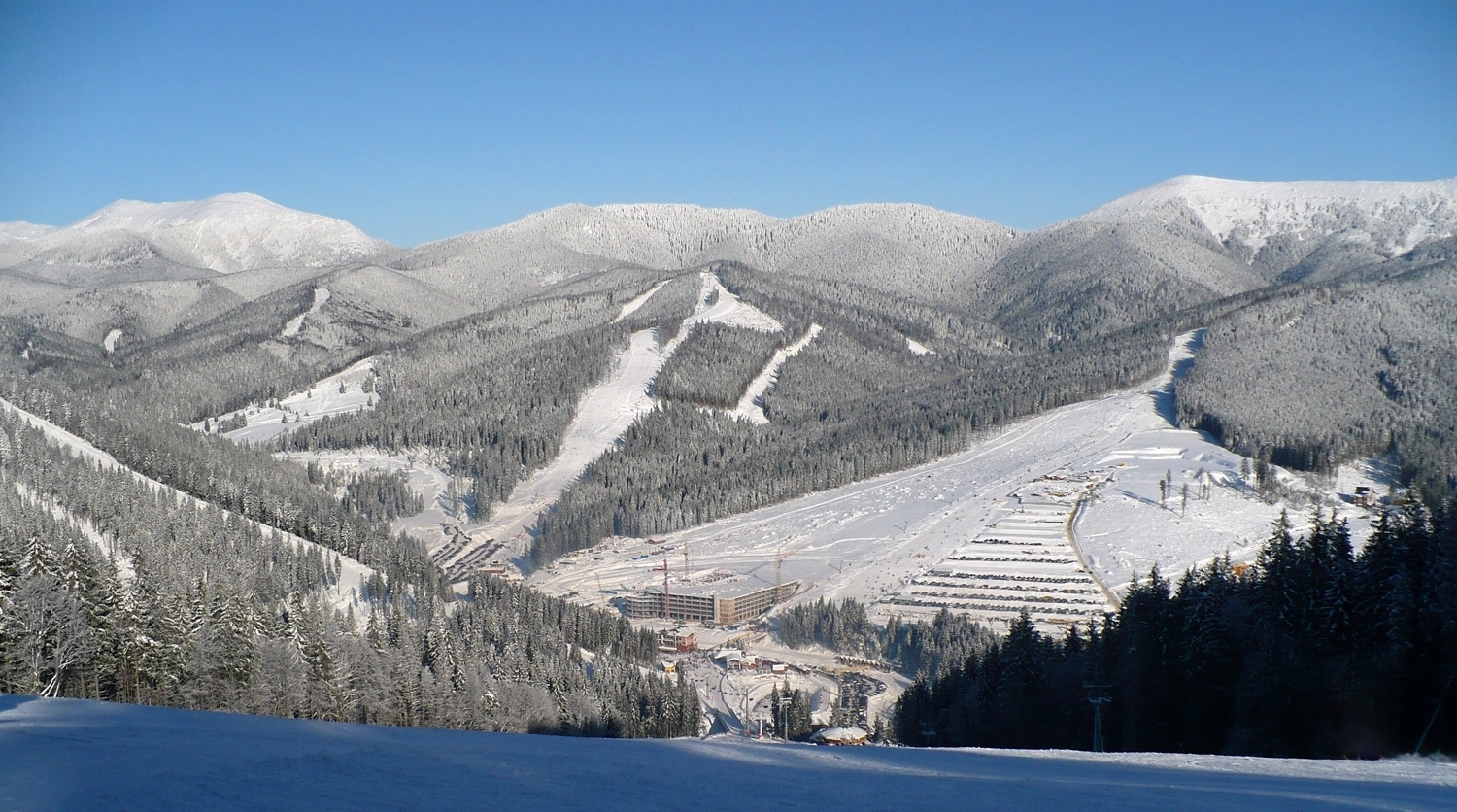
- General view

- Location within Carpathian Mountains Location within Ukraine
- Nearest city: Yaremche
- Coordinates: 48°21′37″N 24°23′32″E
- Vertical: 472 m (1,549 ft)
- Top elevation: 1,372 m (4,501 ft)
- Base elevation: 900 m (3,000 ft)
- Skiable area: 220 ha (540 acres)
- Trails: 68: 30 (22) - Easiest; 26 (24) - More Difficult; 12 - Expert
- Longest run: 2,106 m (6,909 ft)
- Lift system: 19 lifts
- Lift capacity: 35,000 passengers/hr
- Website: Website — https://bukovel.com, Official Telegram — https://t.me/bukovel_resort

Bukovel (Ukrainian: Буковель) is the largest ski resort in Eastern Europe situated in Ukraine, in Nadvirna Raion, Ivano-Frankivsk Oblast (province) of western Ukraine. A part of it is in state property. The resort is located almost on the ridge-lines of the Carpathian Mountains at elevation of 900 m (3,000 ft) above the sea level near the village of Polianytsia (about 1.3 km (0.81 mi) away). It is one of the most popular ski resorts in the Ukrainian Carpathian Mountains and is situated 30 km (19 mi) southwest of the city of Yaremche. In 2012, Bukovel was named the fastest-growing ski resort in the world.

== History ==
The resort was pioneered in 2000 by a joint venture of Scorzonera Ltd. and Horizont AL as an all-year-round tourist and recreational complex. The research for potential ski fields and cableways of the first stage was conducted in cooperation with Plan-Alp, Austria, and Ecosign, Canada, who also finalized the master plan for the resort. By late 2001, a first 691-meter ski lift was launched at the Northern slope of Mountain Bukovel along with the projected chairlift ropeway at the Bukovel's north-western slope. The project was finished in Sept.-Oct. 2002 as a 1000-metre ropeway. In 2003, a second slope, 2A ski run with a chairlift was introduced, and in 2004 a 7A ski run with a surface lift started its operation.

With mere 48,000 visitors in 2003, Bukovel welcomed 206,000 tourists in 2005-2006, 400,000 in 2006-2007 and 850,000 visitors in 2008-2009. The 2010-2011 winter season recorded 1,200,000 day visits with foreigners' amounting to 8-10% of all visitors. In 2012, the Bukovel was named the fastest-growing ski resort worldwide.

In December 2016, after the nationalization of PrivatBank, a part of the Bukovel resort became state-owned. In October 2018, the state-owned part of it was put up for sale. On 7 March 2020 it was announced that portion of the resort that belongs to Privatbank will be sold.

In January 2025, a Sustainable Development Office opened in Bukovel. In December 2025, Bukovel joined the international Climate Friendly Travel program for decarbonization and the development of responsible tourism.

== Infrastructure ==
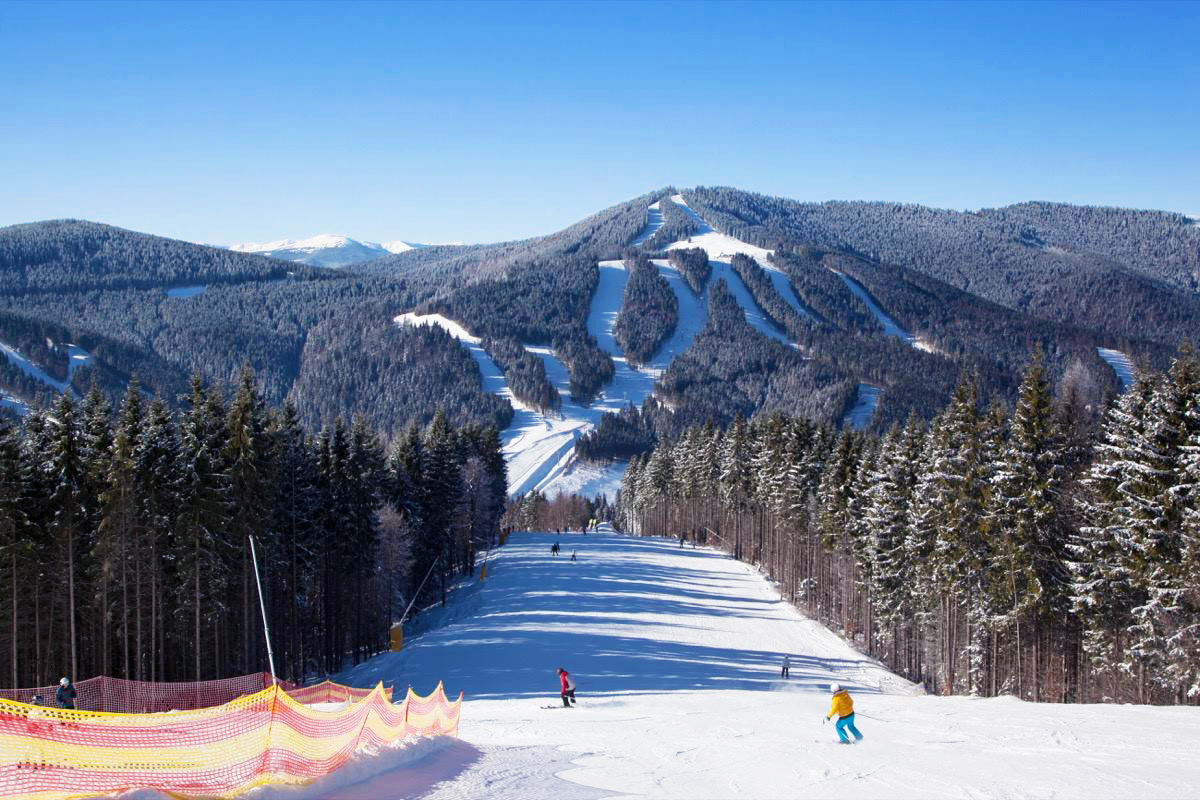
Ski runs

Bukovel currently boasts 17 ski lifts with roughly 60 km (37 mi) of pistes. There are 61 pistes sections of which 12 are Blue (beginners), 41 Red (intermediates) and 8 are Black (experts). The longest piste is 5K at 2,625 m (8,612 ft).

There are 11×4-person chair lifts, 1×3-person chair lift, 1×2-person chair lift and 1×T-bar. The top elevation is on Mount Dovha at 1,372 meters and the base elevation is 900 meters above sea level, for a total vertical drop of 472 meters.

There are five distinct mountains in the area:

- Bukovel – 3,698 ft (1,127 m)
- Chorna Kleva – 4,088 ft (1,246 m)
- Babyn Pohar – 3,870 ft (1,180 m)
- Dovha – 4,501 ft (1,372 m)
- Bulchinokha – 3,770 ft (1,150 m)

On the other side of mount Babyn Pohar is a nature preserve "Gorgany". Bukovel's ski season depends on climatic factors and is usually around the beginning of December to mid-April. Night skiing is available from 4:30 to 7:30 p.m. Bukovel is growing rapidly, and new equipment and runs are being added each year.

== Recreation ==
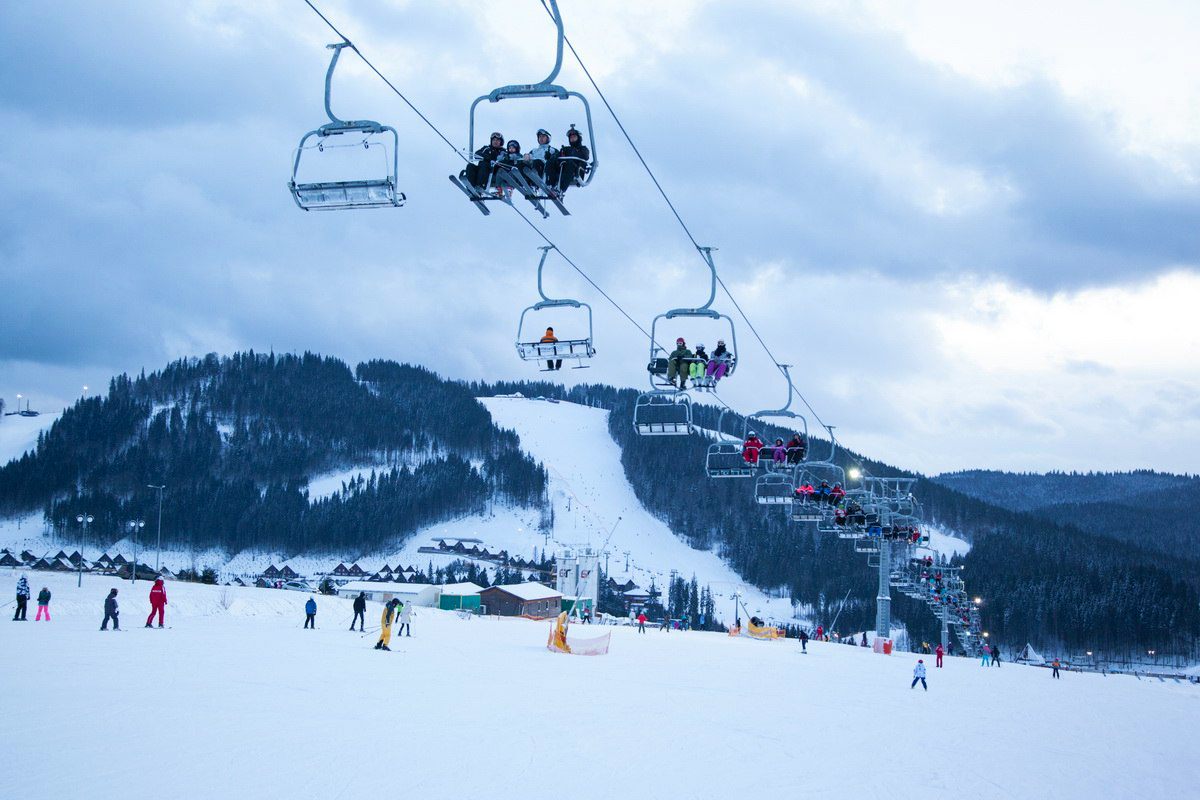
Four-seat lifts

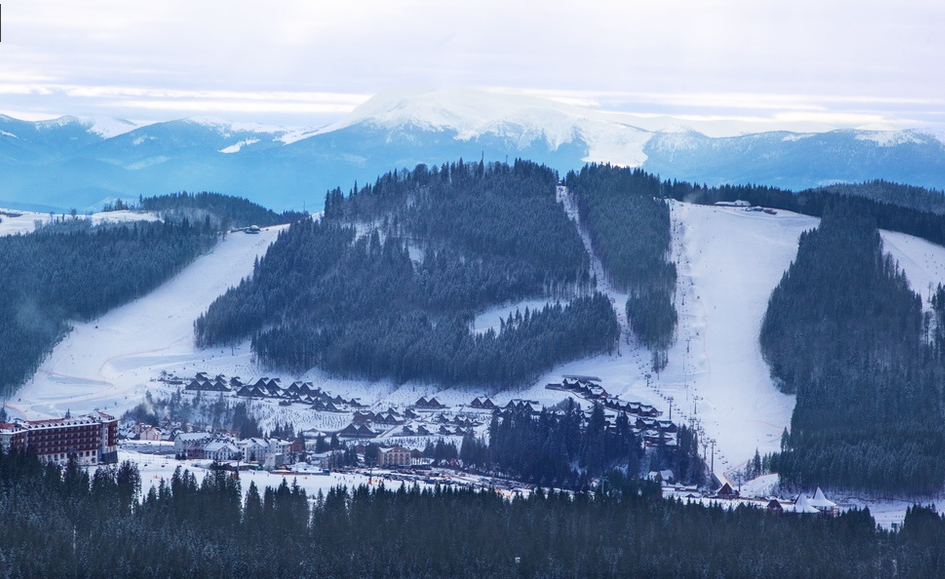

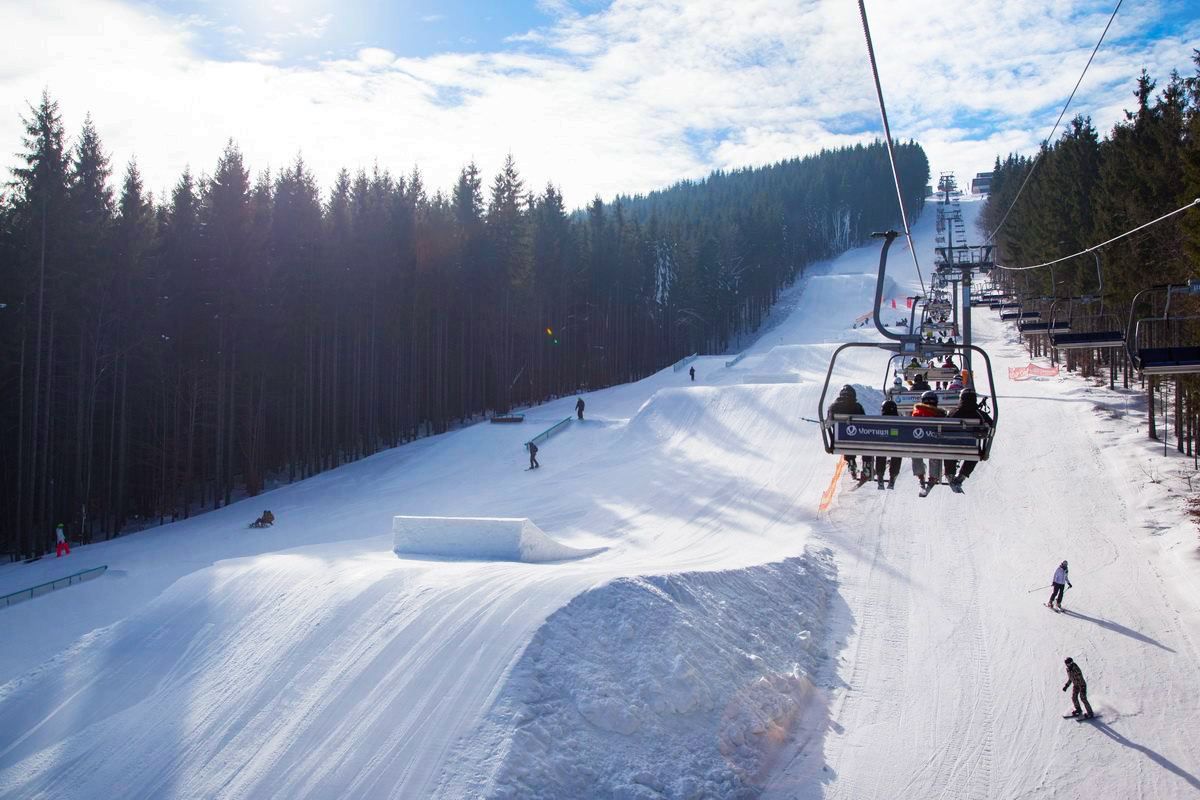
Snow Park

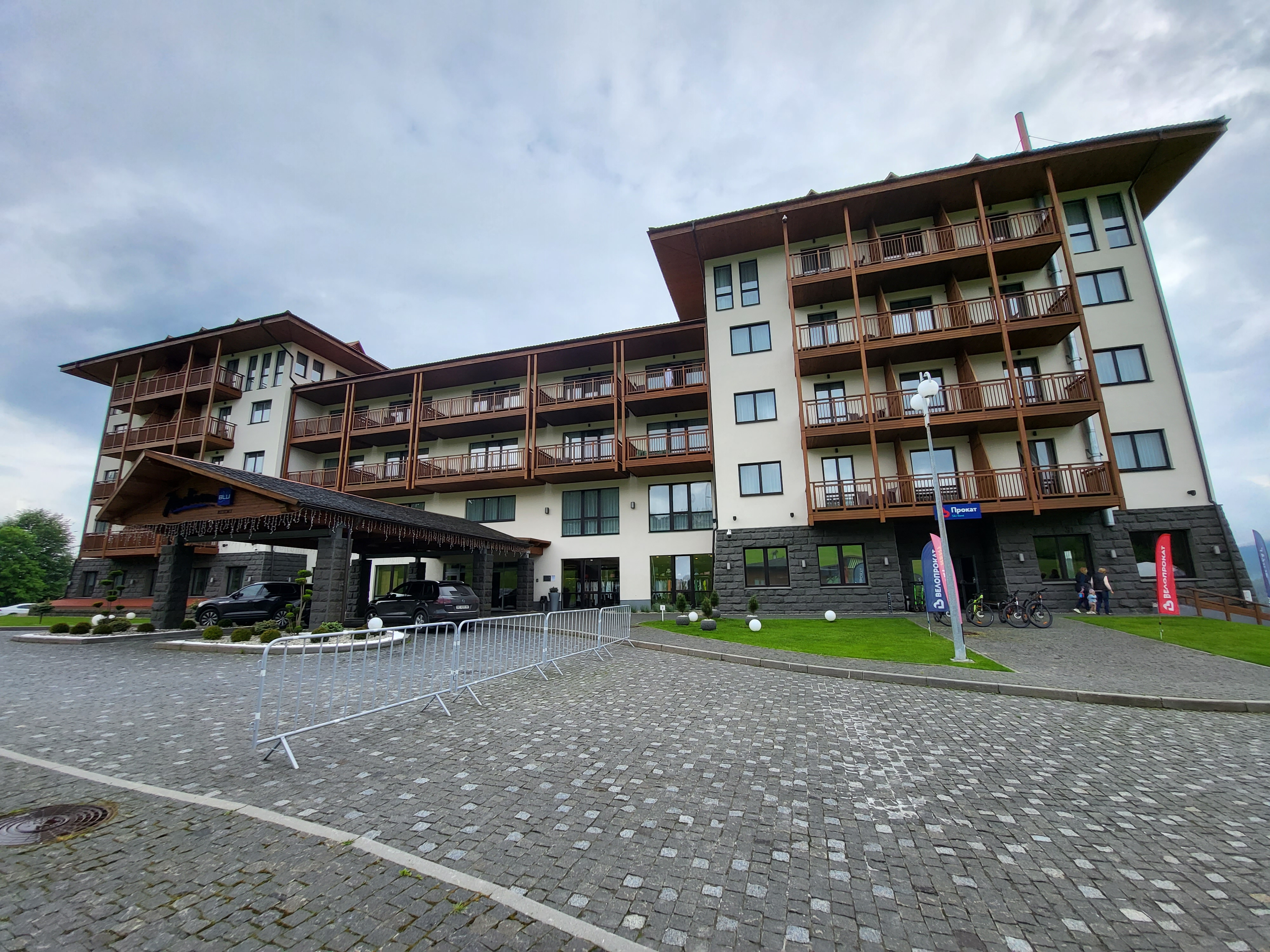
Radisson Blu Resort Bukovel

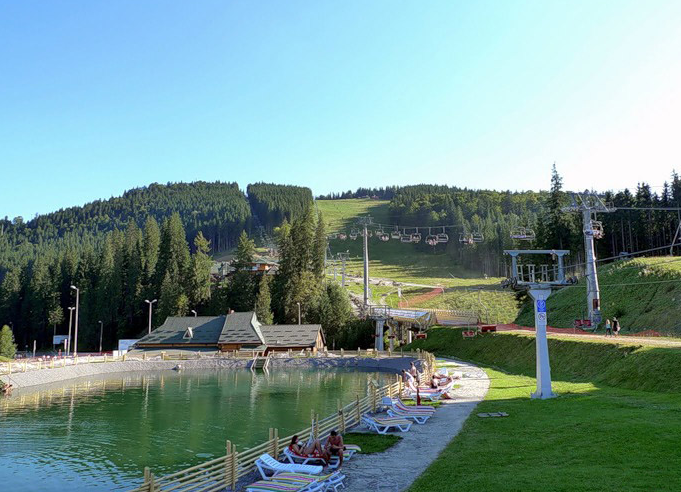
Small lake (ecological heating system) (2015)

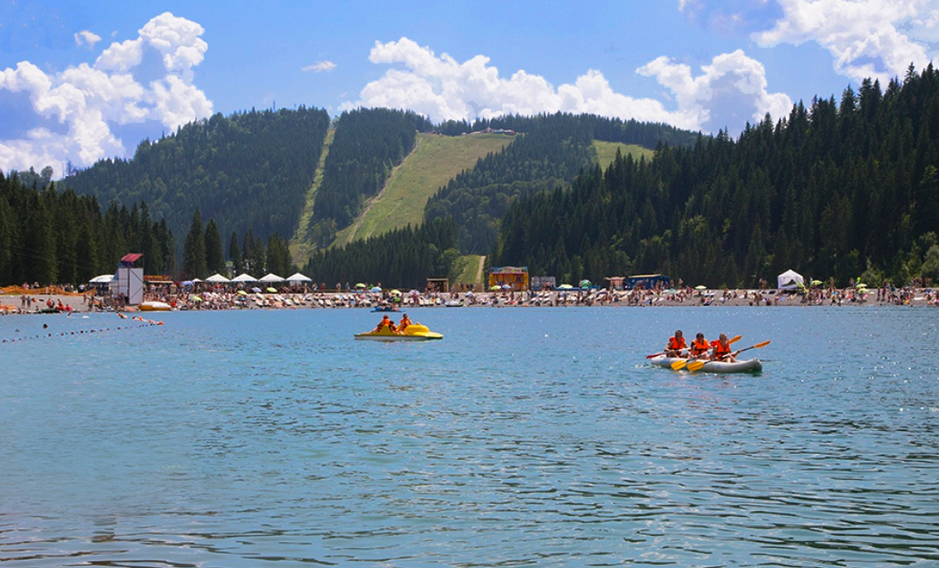
Large Bukovel's lake (2015)

The resort contains all facilities for sports, business, leisure and health

- 60 km of the ski runs equipped with snow cannons
- 68 ski runs of various difficulty levels
- 19 skilifts capable of servicing 35,000 + people an hour
- ski school that includes a school for children
- ski rental shops
- snow park
- bicycle park

=== Accommodations ===
- 7 high-profile hotels
- Capacity to host 1,500 people at the resort itself and 12,000 people in the vicinity
- 4- and 5-star chalets with a garage, swimming pool, sauna and a personal ski-in and ski-out

=== Entertainment ===
- Buka Entertainment Centre
- A lake with an eco-friendly heating and a beach
- Rope alpine-park
- A skating field
- Bicycle park
- Dog sleds riding
- Horse riding
- Quadracycling
- Paintball/Airsoft
- Extreme Sports Park
- Walking tourist routes and tours
- Rafting
- Snowbiking
- Kinder Club for children
- Leopark Children's Entertainment Centre
- Big-Airbag
- Equipment rental (Zorb, Segway scooters, Quad cycles, Snowbikes, Snowtubing, Snowmobiles)

=== Health Facilities ===
Starting in 2008, the Bukovel has been developing as a health and balneotherapy centre for people with problems with musculoskeletal, digestive and urinary systems (as attested by the Odessa Institute for Baleotherapy and Resorts). Bukovel has a free-of-charge pump room to drink mineral water. The resort is also known for its baths of mineral water and herb extracts.

=== The Largest Artificial Lake in Ukraine ===
In the summer of 2014, Bukovel opened the largest artificial lake in Ukraine.

- area of 6,8 hectares

- dimensions of 750 x 140 m

- the beach stretching for 2 km

- the depth up to 15 m

The lake was the most ambitious resort project, worth almost ₴150 million.

The lake shores have arranged deckchairs, recreation areas and beach cafes. And on the lake itself there is the whole range of water activities:

- water - skis
- wakeboarding
- kayaking
- business jet
- jet - ski
- waterslide
- diving school

For the safety of tourists, all sites have experienced instructors and accredited lifeguards present. The areas for swimming and water activities are delineated.

The lake water is clear and warm up to 20-22 degrees. Among tourists, the lake has been called the "Carpathian Sea".

== Ski runs and lifts ==
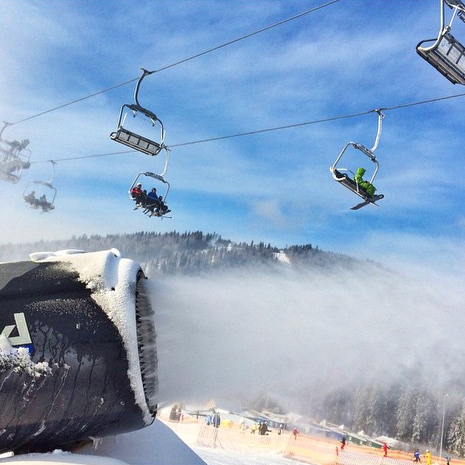
Snow Cannon

Bukovel comprises facilities situated at five mountains: Dovha (1,372 m), Bukovel (1,127 m), Bulchinekha (1,455 m), Babiy Pohar (1,180 m), and Chorna Kleva (1,241 m) thus giving it 68 km of ski runs of various difficulty levels.

All runs provide space for up to 15,000 skiers to ski simultaneously. The runs are on slopes with grass basis, equipped with snow cannons and protected from direct sun light. Three of the runs are lighted to provide skiing at night.

During the season, the resort has 19 ski lifts with a total capacity of about 35,000 people per hour.

At the same time, 20 thousand people can ride comfortably on the slopes of the resort.

Number of trails: 68

Track length: from 300 to 2353 m.

Classification of tracks: blue, red, black, mogul (1B) and free-ride (there are sports tracks and a biathlon track)

Altitude difference: from 40 to 285 m.

The resort also has a professional giant slalom run and a mogul run 1A.

Ski resort has 19 ski lifts, including:

- 1 six-seat chairlift (lift 3)
- 13 four-seat chairlifts (lifts 1R, 2R, 5, 7, 8, 11, 12, 13, 14, 15, 16, 17, 22)
- 1 three-seat chairlift (lift 9)
- 1 two-seat chairlift (lift 2)
- 3 T-bar lifts & ski travolator (lifts 6, 7R, M)

Besides, there are several surface lifts for beginners (rope tows and magic carpet).

== Hotels ==
=== 5* hotels ===
Glacier Premium Apartments

Radisson Blu Resort Bukovel

HAY boutique hotel & spa by Edem Family

=== 4* hotels ===
HVOYA

Mountain Residence Apartments & Chalet

Black & White Villas by Fomich Hotels Group

Amstel-Ski

WOL 07 by Ribas

BUKA Apart-Hotel & SPA

== Bukovel Ski School ==
Bukovel Ski School was set up in 2001 by the Bukovel Ski Resort and ski and snowboarding coaches. It trains people of all ages, as well as provides training grounds for professional sportsmen. The School promotes skiing and health programmes. During each season the Bukovel Ski Schools organizes over 30 ski and snowboarding events for children, amateurs, professional sportsmen and coaches. In the summertime the School holds a children's health and sports camp programmes and other leisure events for Bukovel's visitors.

The Bukovel Ski School co-sponsors several large-scale charity social projects among children, junior sportsmen and students of boarding schools to promote skiing. The School cooperates with Ukraine's Ministry for Education and Science and Ministry for Youth and Sports, Ski Federation of Ukraine and Ukraine's National Olympic Committee. All coaches have qualified under ISIA, international standards for skiing and snowboarding instructors.

== Bukovel Bike Park ==
Bike Park at the Bukovel Ski Resort has routes for various mountain biking disciplines (MTB):

- Cross-Country
- DownHill

The bike routes run for 46.7 km with 4.7 km for speed downhill biking. The Bike Park has 10 routes of various difficulty and length, from general tours to DownHill and SuperD.

Over 6,000 visitors came to the Park each season.

The Bukovel Bike Park organizes and hosts a number of biking events yearly, including the Bukovel Grand Bike Fest, Ukraine's National DownHill Championship and Bukovel DH.

== Bukovel Sport Weekends ==
In 2016, Bukovel held 4 sport events: Bukovel Sprint Triathlon Cup, Bukovel Mountain UltraSwim, Bukovel Triathlon Olympic Cup and Bukovel Endurance UltraTrail. The Sport Weekends concept became popular among Ukrainian sportsmen – they chose the hardest distances and the highest mountain competitions. Bukovel aims to become a sports capital of Ukraine. To attain this objective the resort has increased the number of competitions and distance options. Under the "Train and Compete in Bukovel" slogan in 2017 Bukovel Sport Weekends are to consist of:

- 20/05 – Bukovel Cycling Race
- 27/05 – Bukovel Sprint Triathlon Cup
- 11-13/08 – Bukovel 160 km UltraTrail
- 2/09 – Bukovel Mountain UltraSwim
- 9/09 – Bukovel Olympic Triathlon Cup
- 16-17 – Bukovel Endurance 55 km Trail
- 30/09 – Bukovel 1/2 Iron Triathlon

== Winter Olympic ambitions ==
The local government announced in 2006 that the Bukovel ski and snowboard resort was expanding to 262 acres (1.06 km^{2}) in anticipation of Ukraine (Lviv) bidding to host the 2018 Winter Olympics. The additional land will be used for the construction of several new ski lifts and service projects. Previously, the land was a government-managed forest preserve area. Bukovel has also plans to build an Olympic winter stadium in preparation for a possible bid. In 2008, the head of the Ukrainian NOC (National Olympic Committee), Serhiy Bubka, announced that even though Bukovel is a world-class ski-resort the talks of hosting the Olympic games are ridiculous as the town does not have the required infrastructure to host such a big event. The deadline for the Olympic bid was October 15, 2009, for which Bukovel was not prepared.

In 2019 the Bukovel ski resort had 60 kilometers of slopes, they required compensating for low snowfall by producing artificial snow because the highest point is only 1300 meters above sea level. Bukovel, however, has too little water to produce enough artificial snow.

In the early months of 2010, the administration of Bukovel was involved in the government scandal around the dismissal of the director of the Gorgany Natural Preserve. Vasyl Kisliak was fired by the Minister for protection of the natural environment Filipchuk "for a low level of organizational skills" as the administration of Bukovel could not find a middle ground and cooperation with the director. The cornerstone of the argument became an infrastructural development of the resort and particularly a road that would connect Bukovel with Yaremche.

In 2014, Ukraine dropped its 2022 Olympic bid due to the War in Donbas. Officials said they would focus on bidding for the 2026 Winter Games.

In 2021 some 55 environmental groups demanded that the International Olympic Committee (IOC) not to consider Ukraine as a venue for Winter Games. The criticism is that the Ukrainian government under President Zelenskyy is using an Olympic bid as a pretext to be able to implement several controversial construction projects in the Carpathians. The Carpathians are one of the largest forest regions in Europe and include the last Ancient and Primeval Beech Forests of Europe. The ecosystem could be thrown out of balance by the construction projects.

== Gallery ==
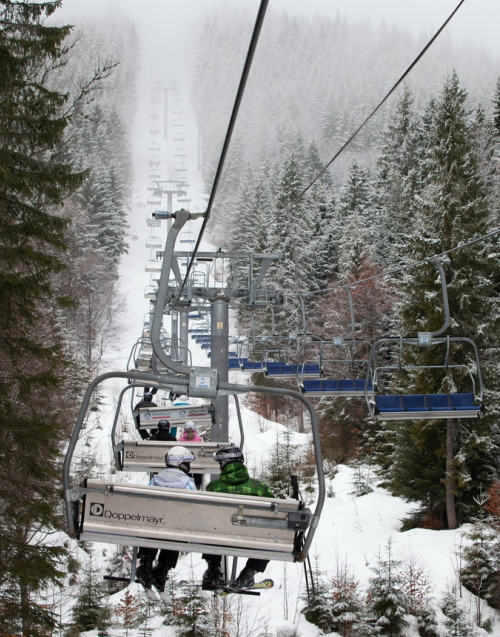

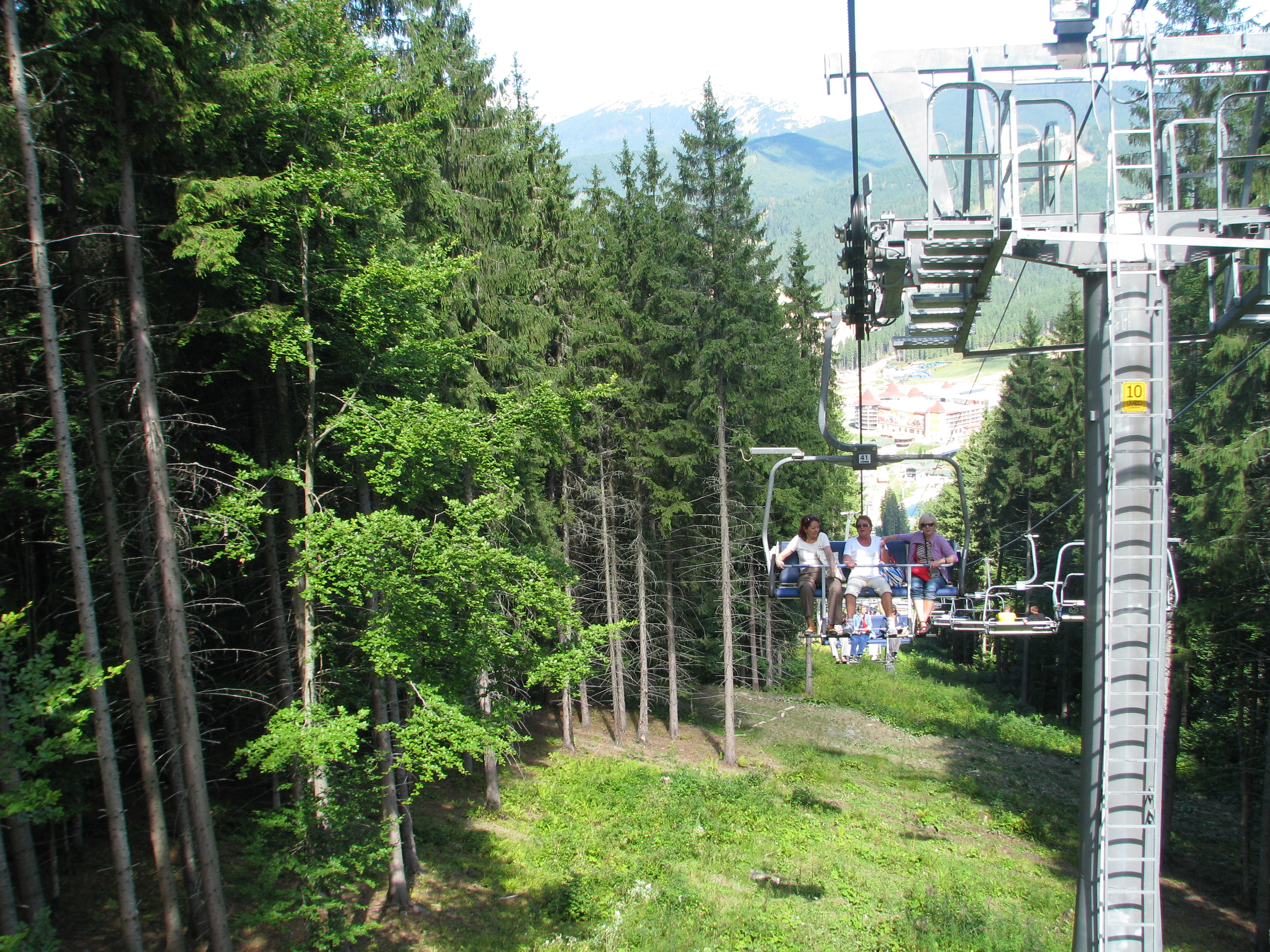

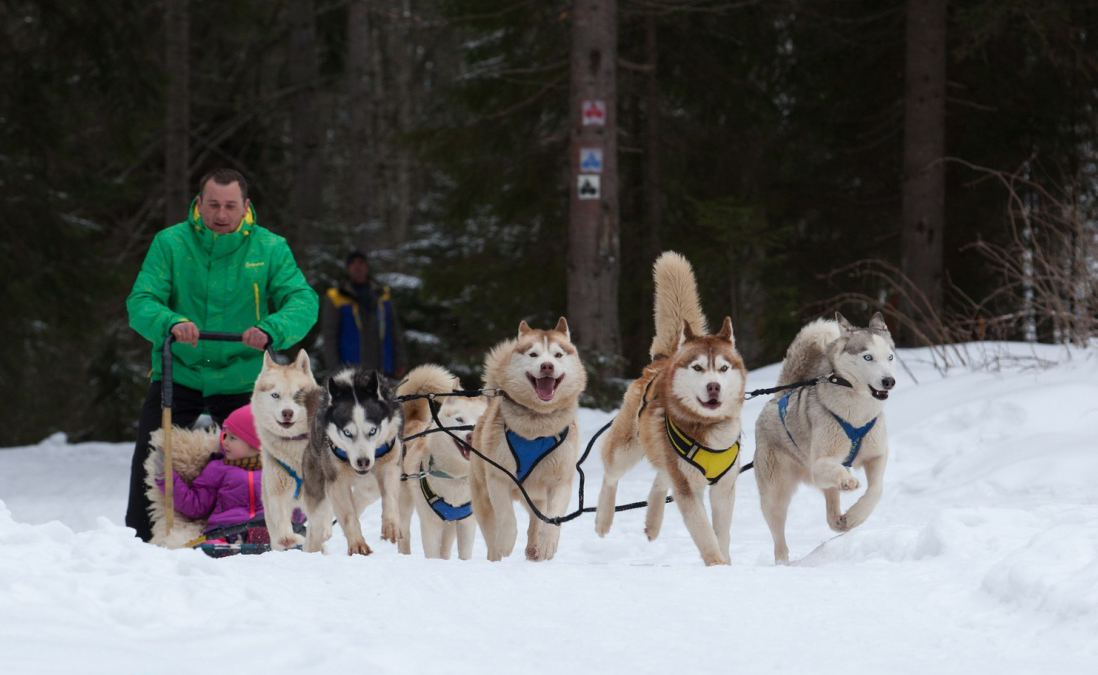

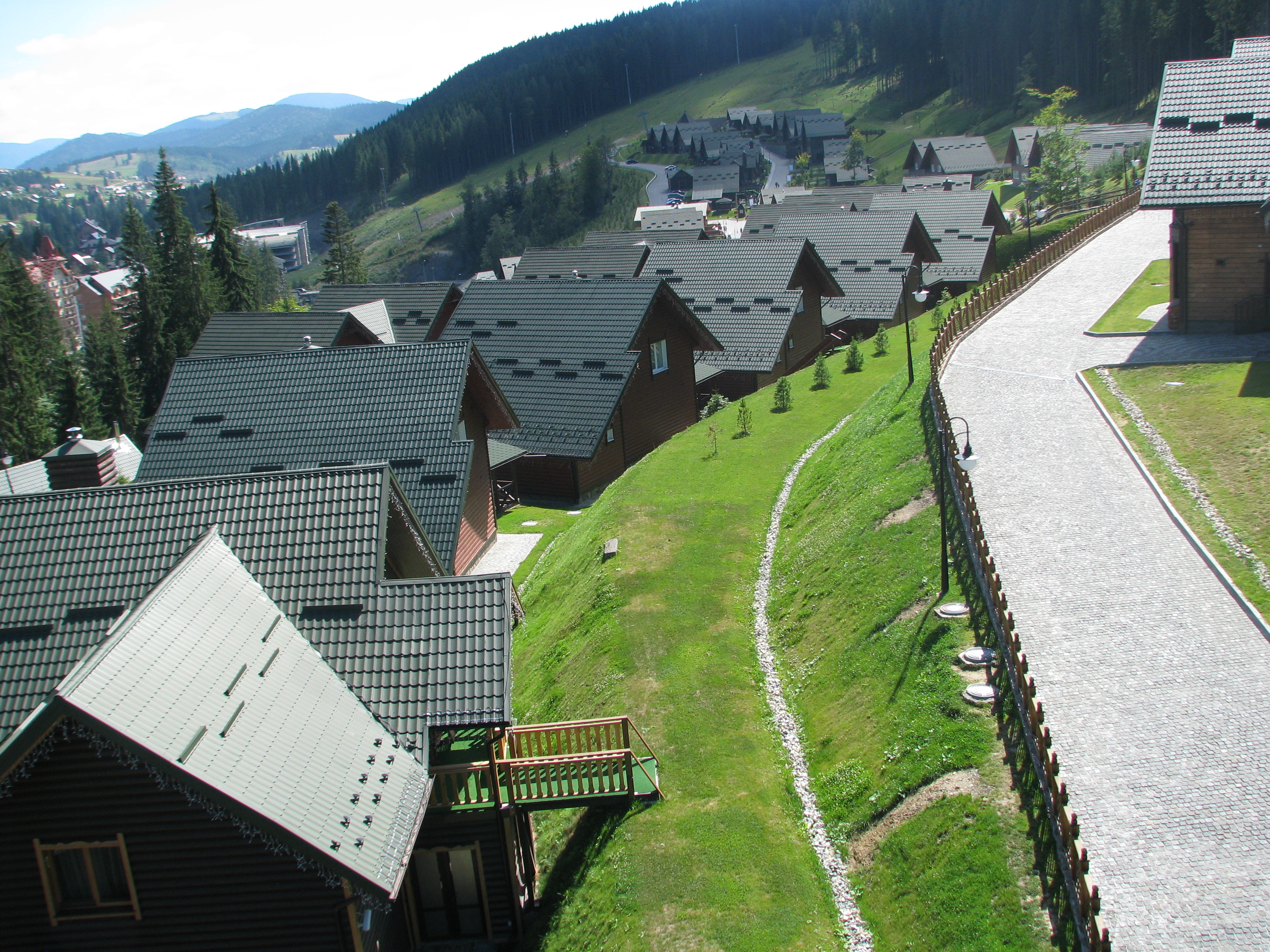

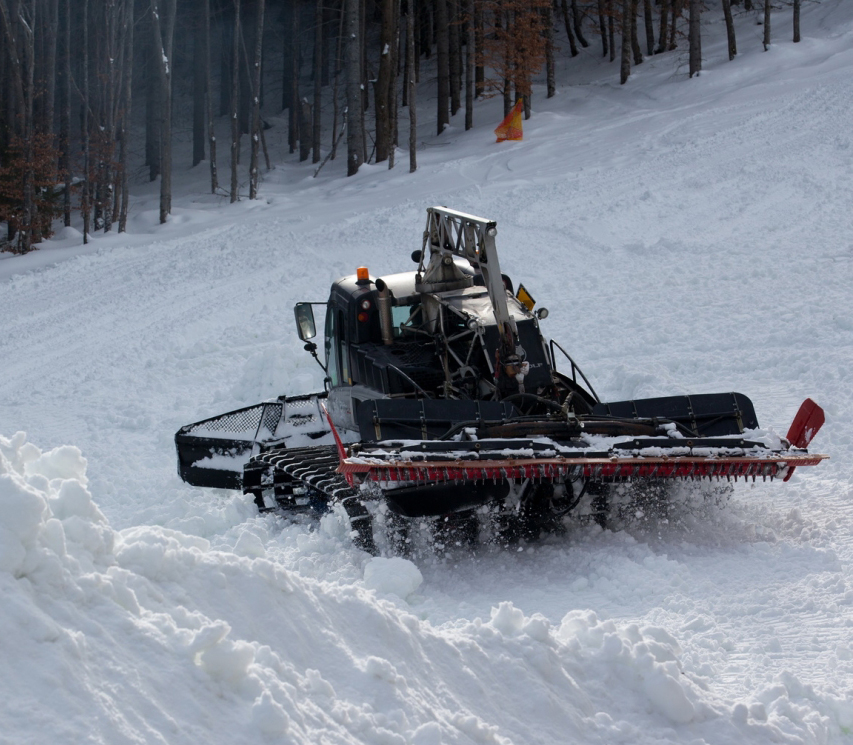

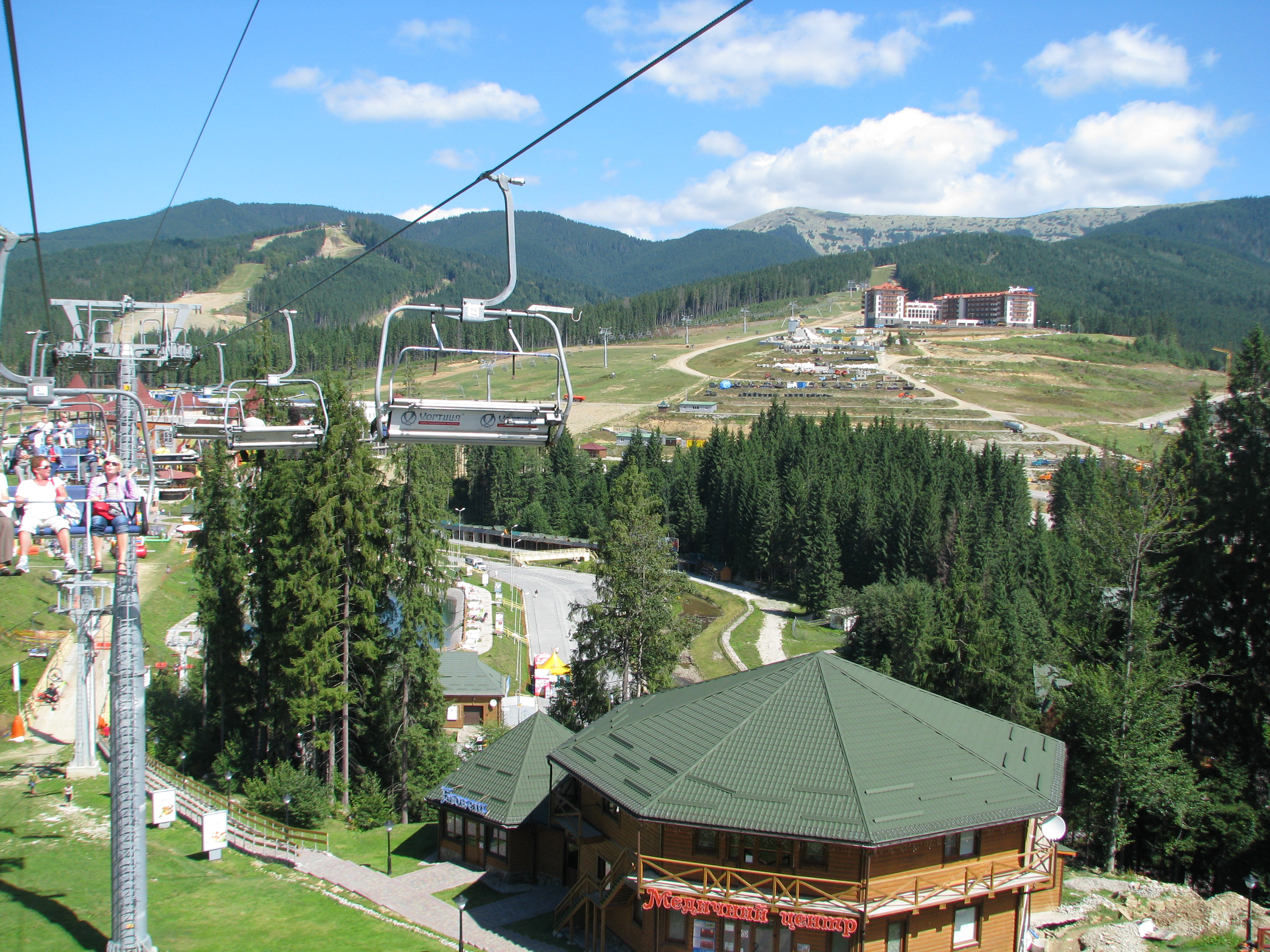

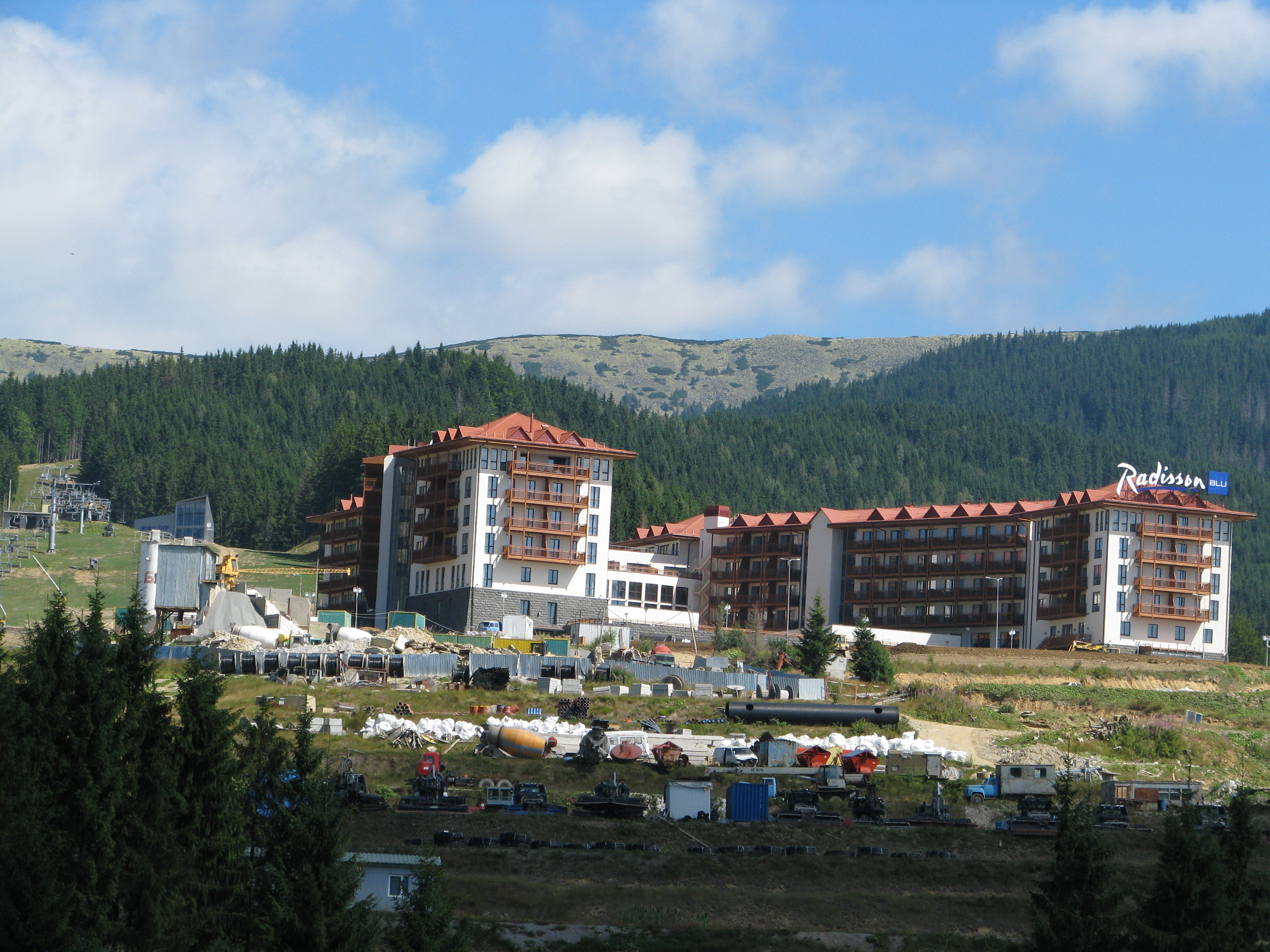

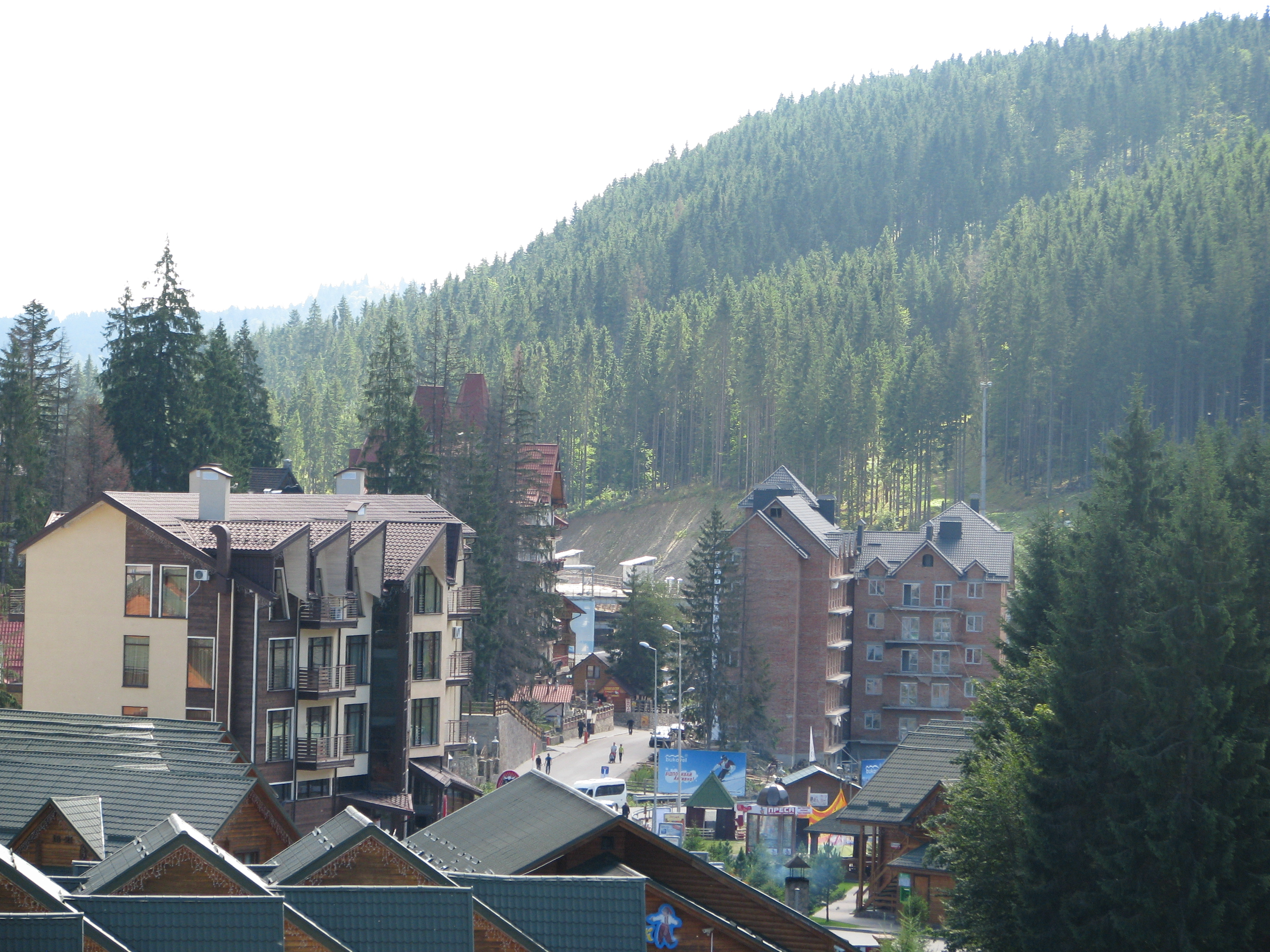

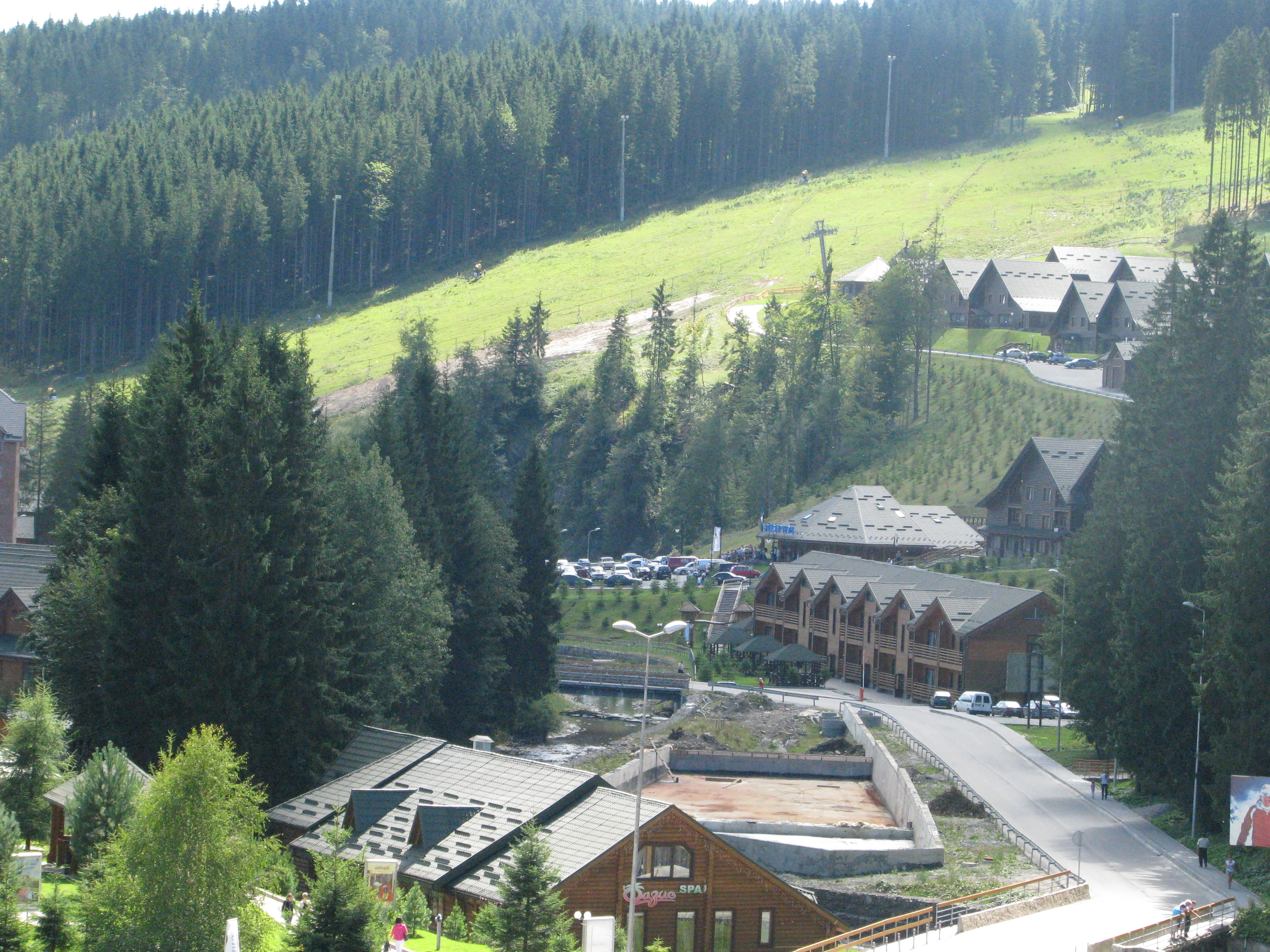

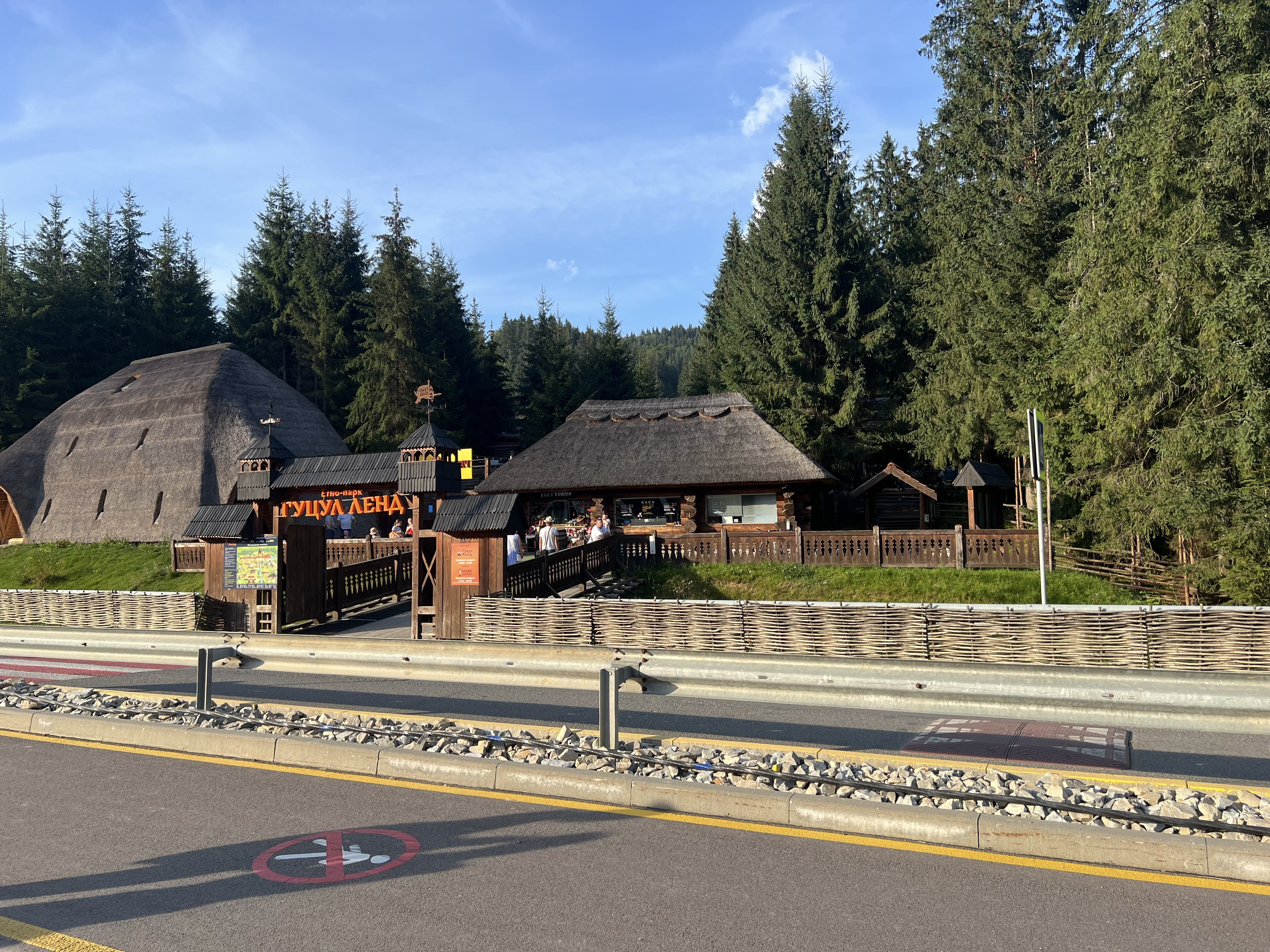

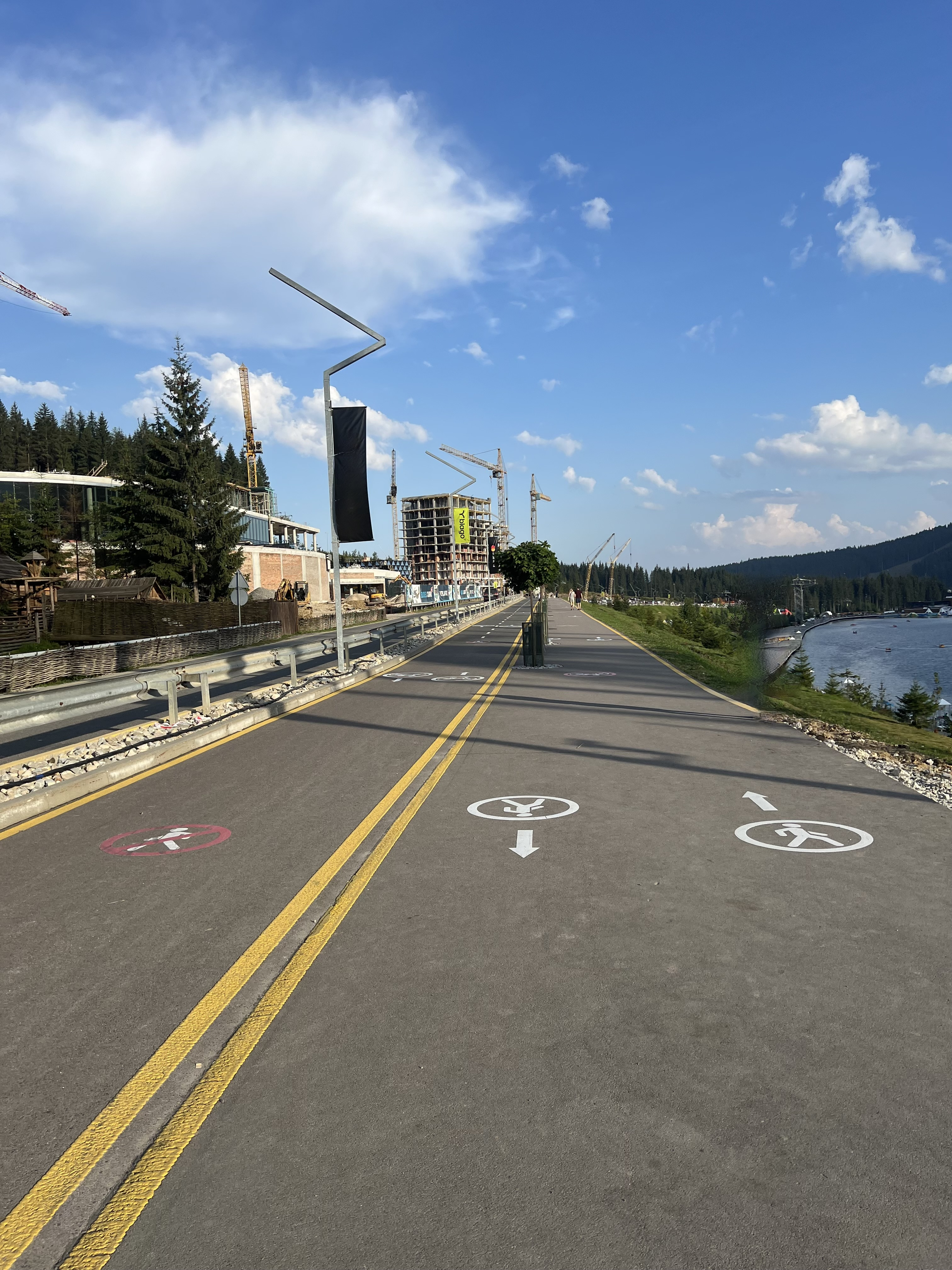

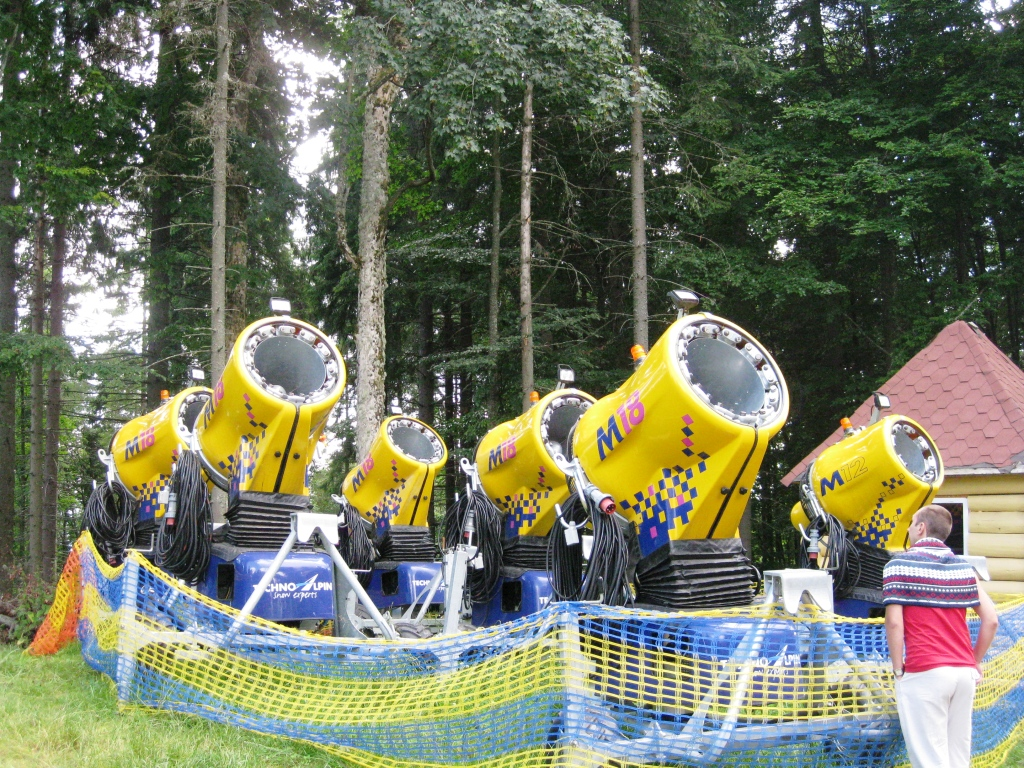

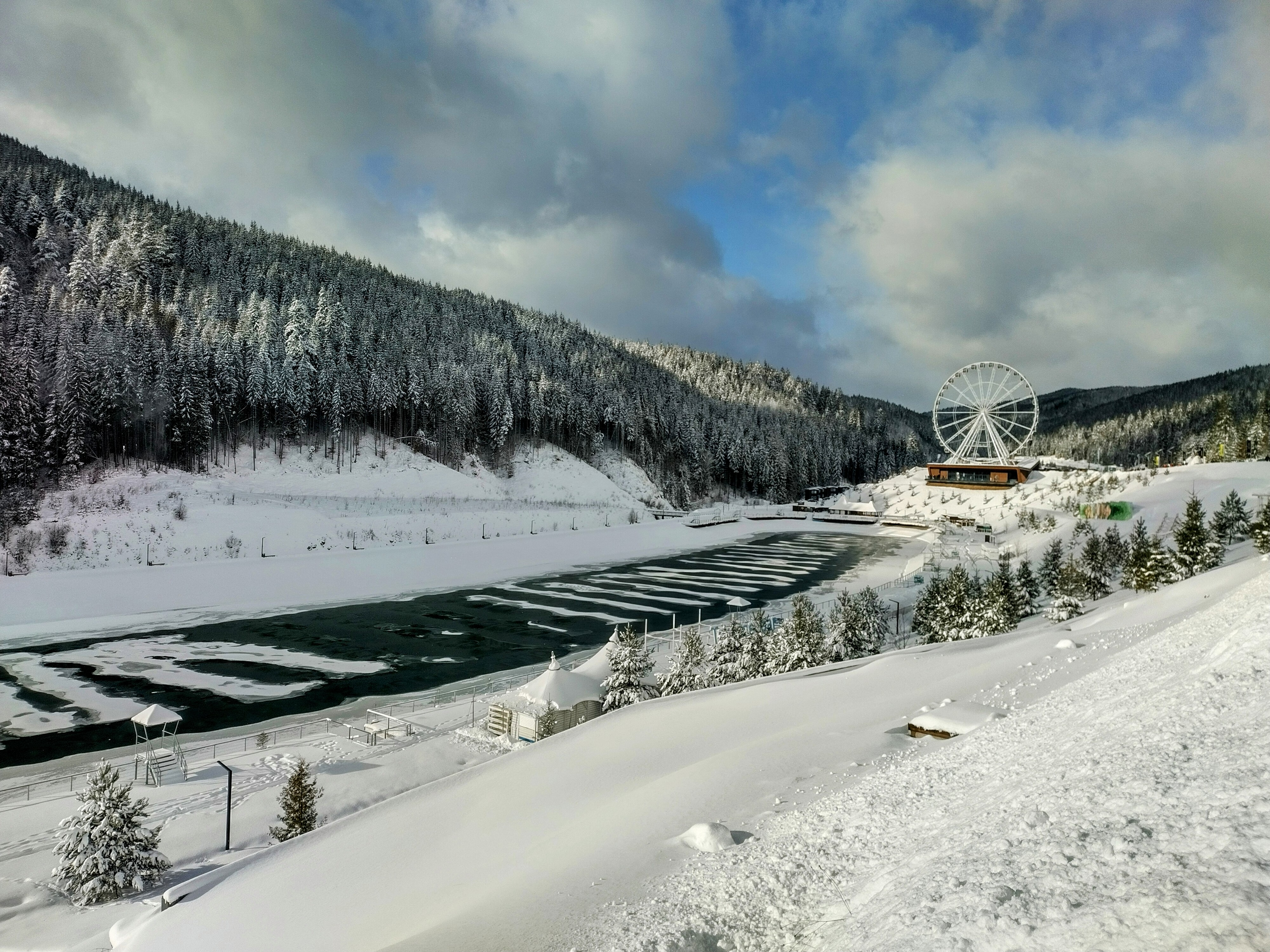

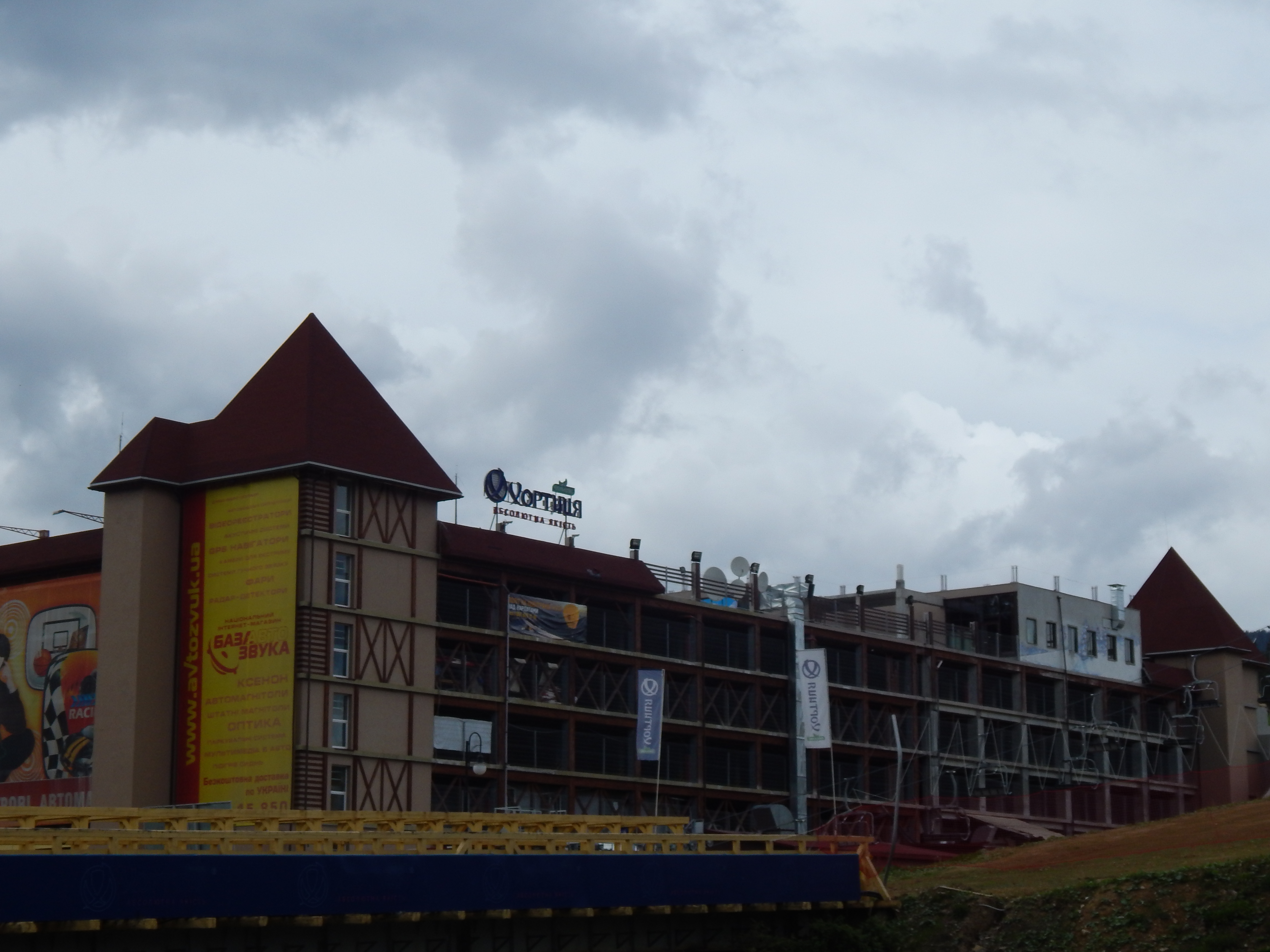

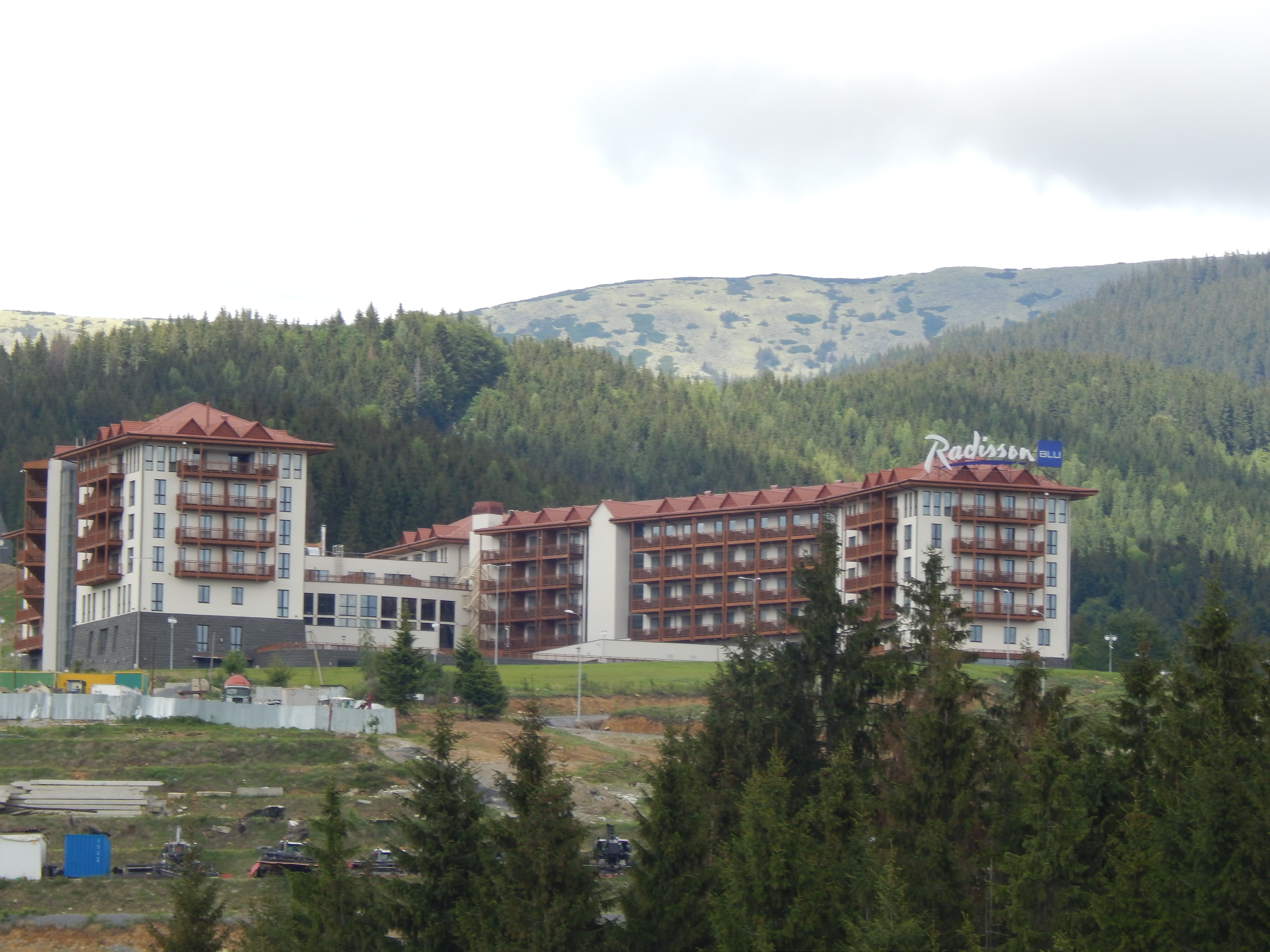
