= FIS Freestyle Ski and Snowboarding World Championships 2019 – Men's aerials =

Men's aerials at the FIS Freestyle Ski and Snowboarding World Championships 2019
- Venue: Deer Valley
- Location: Utah, United States
- Dates: February 5–6
- Competitors: 25 from 9 nations
- Winning points: 130.09

Medalists
gold medal	Maxim Burov	Russia
silver medal	Oleksandr Abramenko	Ukraine
bronze medal	Noé Roth	Switzerland

The Men's aerials competition at the FIS Freestyle Ski and Snowboarding World Championships 2019 was held on February 5 and 6, 2019.

== Qualification ==
The qualification was started on February 5, at 15:35. The 12 best skiers qualified for the final.

Rank	Bib	Start order	Name	Country	Q1	Q2	Notes
1	18	22	Noé Roth	Switzerland	120.81		Q
2	5	8	Oleksandr Abramenko	Ukraine	119.03		Q
3	4	11	Ilya Burov	Russia	116.74		Q
4	14	25	Alex Bowen	United States	116.37		Q
5	1	5	Maxim Burov	Russia	116.29		Q
6	8	6	Anton Kushnir	Belarus	114.60		Q
7	3	10	Stanislav Nikitin	Russia	112.67	119.91	Q
8	17	3	Pavel Krotov	Russia	112.67	119.91	Q
9	2	15	Wang Xindi	China	104.87	119.00	Q
10	7	24	Christopher Lillis	United States	99.56	114.93	Q
11	6	2	Pirmin Werner	Switzerland	113.14	106.51	Q
12	13	18	Dimitri Isler	Switzerland	112.83	102.71	Q
13	9	23	Sun Jiaxu	China	112.59	111.06	
14	19	9	Jonathon Lillis	United States	104.87	105.88	
15	20	21	Naoya Tabara	Japan	94.69	58.82	
16	12	1	Dzmitry Mazurkevich	Belarus	68.88	93.55	
17	23	20	Wu Shudi	China	92.00	88.20	
18	16	7	Nicolas Gygax	Switzerland	86.28	70.97	
19	15	12	Eric Loughran	United States	51.77	80.19	
20	11	4	Maxim Gustik	Belarus	79.74	DNS	
21	25	19	Baglan Inkarbek	Kazakhstan	79.38	60.61	
22	26	13	Shi Haitao	China	63.99	79.20	
23	22	14	Ildar Badrutdinov	Kazakhstan	68.35	62.35	
24	21	17	Félix Cormier-Boucher	Canada	60.12	65.61	
25	24	16	Nicholas Novak	United States	38.94	43.33	

== Final ==
The final was started on February 6, at 19:20.

Rank	Bib	Name	Country	Run 1	Run 2	Best	Run 3
1st place, gold medalist(s)	1	Maxim Burov	Russia	128.51	128.96	128.96	130.09
2nd place, silver medalist(s)	5	Oleksandr Abramenko	Ukraine	121.24	113.40	121.24	126.24
3rd place, bronze medalist(s)	18	Noé Roth	Switzerland	117.19	104.49	117.19	125.22
4	17	Pavel Krotov	Russia	84.51	125.34	125.34	107.24
5	3	Stanislav Nikitin	Russia	114.48	125.22	125.22	80.54
6	2	Wang Xindi	China	119.91	119.91	119.91	61.50
7	7	Christopher Lillis	United States	115.05	113.40	115.05	
8	8	Anton Kushnir	Belarus	114.93	86.88	114.93	
9	6	Pirmin Werner	Switzerland	83.91	112.99	112.99	
10	4	Ilya Burov	Russia	112.67	99.56	112.67	
11	13	Dimitri Isler	Switzerland	111.51	109.95	111.51	
12	14	Alex Bowen	United States	67.70	80.54	80.54	
