= FIS Freestyle Ski and Snowboarding World Championships 2017 – Men's aerials =

The men's aerials competition of the FIS Freestyle Ski and Snowboarding World Championships 2017 was held at Sierra Nevada, Spain on March 9 (qualifying) and March 10 (finals). 27 athletes from 11 countries competed.

== Qualification ==
The following are the results of the qualification.

| Rank | Bib | Name | Country | Q1 | Q2 | Notes |
|---|---|---|---|---|---|---|
| 1 | 2 | Mac Bohonnon | United States | 124.34 | | Q |
| 2 | 1 | Qi Guangpu | China | 118.55 | | Q |
| 3 | 4 | Zhou Hang | China | 113.28 | | Q |
| 4 | 18 | David Morris | Australia | 112.83 | | Q |
| 5 | 16 | Jia Zongyang | China | 112.39 | | Q |
| 6 | 8 | Jonathan Lillis | United States | 111.95 | | Q |
| 7 | 5 | Maxim Gustik | Belarus | 86.28 | 108.75 | Q |
| 8 | 12 | Stanislau Hladchenko | Belarus | 108.54 | 94.69 | Q |
| 9 | 14 | Liu Zhongqing | China | 79.38 | 104.43 | Q |
| 10 | 15 | Olivier Rochon | Canada | 103.54 | 102.46 | Q |
| 11 | 7 | Maxim Burov | Russia | 94.69 | 99.63 | Q |
| 12 | 9 | Stanislav Nikitin | Russia | 79.20 | 99.63 | Q |
| 13 | 17 | Dimitri Isler | Switzerland | 97.74 | 91.59 | |
| 14 | 6 | Wang Xindi | China | 91.12 | 95.58 | |
| 15 | 26 | Naoya Tabara | Japan | 86.28 | 95.47 | |
| 16 | 11 | Eric Loughran | United States | 76.55 | 94.36 | |
| 17 | 20 | Mischa Gasser | Switzerland | 38.49 | 91.85 | |
| 18 | 30 | Noe Roth | Switzerland | 76.83 | 90.94 | |
| 19 | 19 | Travis Gerrits | Canada | 71.68 | 90.50 | |
| 20 | 25 | Lloyd Wallace | Great Britain | 85.17 | 68.04 | |
| 21 | 22 | Nicolas Gygax | Switzerland | 73.34 | 78.16 | |
| 22 | 29 | Baglan Inkarbek | Kazakhstan | 75.24 | 63.99 | |
| 23 | 28 | Dmitriy Lim | Kazakhstan | 66.12 | 57.33 | |
| 24 | 27 | Ildar Badrutdinov | Kazakhstan | 63.63 | 63.51 | |
| 25 | 32 | Yoon Gi-chan | South Korea | 51.66 | 45.77 | |
| 26 | 31 | Kim Nam-jeen | South Korea | 32.50 | 47.56 | |
| 27 | 10 | Alex Bowen | United States | 41.59 | DNS | |

== Final ==
The following are the results of the finals.

| Rank | Bib | Name | Country | Final 1 | Final 2 | Final 3 |
|---|---|---|---|---|---|---|
| 1st place, gold medalist(s) | 8 | Jonathan Lillis | United States | 84.64 | 123.01 | 125.79 |
| 2nd place, silver medalist(s) | 1 | Qi Guangpu | China | 100.84 | 115.49 | 120.36 |
| 3rd place, bronze medalist(s) | 18 | David Morris | Australia | 107.32 | 110.62 | 114.93 |
| 4 | 16 | Jia Zongyang | China | 115.42 | 122.62 | 99.56 |
| 5 | 12 | Stanislau Hladchenko | Belarus | 102.06 | 107.29 | 95.58 |
| 6 | 15 | Olivier Rochon | Canada | 101.45 | 112.39 | 85.52 |
| 7 | 5 | Maxim Gustik | Belarus | 104.08 | 98.94 | |
| 8 | 4 | Zhou Hang | China | 104.49 | 83.63 | |
| 9 | 9 | Stanislav Nikitin | Russia | 89.34 | 59.29 | |
| 10 | 2 | Mac Bohonnon | United States | 80.59 | | |
| 11 | 7 | Maxim Burov | Russia | 75.56 | | |
| 12 | 14 | Liu Zhongqing | China | 58.72 | | |
