= FIS Freestyle Ski and Snowboarding World Championships 2015 – Men's aerials =

The men's aerials competition of the FIS Freestyle Ski and Snowboarding World Championships 2015 was held at Kreischberg, Austria, on January 14 (qualifying) and January 15th (finals). 22 athletes from 9 countries competed.

== Qualification ==
The following are the results of the qualification.

Rank	Bib	Name	Country	Q1	Q2	Notes
1	5	Ilya Burov	Russia	117.65		Q
2	21	Travis Gerrits	Canada	115.49		Q
3	9	Denis Osipau	Belarus	113.28		Q
4	3	Zhou Hang	China	112.67		Q
5	14	Alex Bowen	United States	107.97		Q
6	11	Timofei Slivets	Russia	105.75		Q
7	12	Jia Zongyang	China	101.77	121.72	Q
8	7	Maxim Gustik	Belarus	86.73	118.55	Q
9	6	Michael Rossi	United States	98.23	114.03	Q
10	13	Oleksandr Abramenko	Ukraine	83.19	114.03	Q
11	10	Jonathon Lillis	United States	63.35	112.39	Q
12	1	Qi Guangpu	China	87.78	108.41	Q
13	20	Dimitri Isler	Switzerland	90.72	97.87	
14	2	Mac Bohonnon	United States	95.02	88.50	
15	18	Lloyd Wallace	United Kingdom	93.41	81.07	
16	16	Stanislau Hladchenko	Belarus	71.39	91.96	
17	15	Olivier Rochon	Canada	91.59	62.44	
18	8	Wang Xindi	China	90.82	66.50	
19	4	Pavel Krotov	Russia	89.82	84.16	
20	17	Mischa Gasser	Switzerland	82.24	87.88	
21	19	Mykola Puzderko	Ukraine	79.38	75.56	
22	22	Naoya Tabara	Japan	76.92	50.44	

== Final ==
The following are the results of the finals.

Rank	Bib	Name	Country	Final 1	Final 2	Final 3
1st place, gold medalist(s)	1	Qi Guangpu	China	122.57	121.27	139.50
2nd place, silver medalist(s)	14	Alex Bowen	United States	96.79	115.49	121.27
3rd place, bronze medalist(s)	7	Maxim Gustik	Belarus	109.35	116.82	119.91
4	3	Zhou Hang	China	99.63	124.34	115.84
5	5	Ilya Burov	Russia	106.64	102.26	106.79
6	12	Jia Zongyang	China	123.90	95.47	90.50
7	10	Jonathon Lillis	United States	108.41	90.50	
8	6	Michael Rossi	United States	104.49	88.94	
9	11	Timofei Slivets	Russia	112.39	85.97	
10	13	Oleksandr Abramenko	Ukraine	96.44		
11	9	Denis Osipau	Belarus	84.96		
12	21	Travis Gerrits	Canada	81.83		
