= Freestyle skiing at the 2018 Winter Olympics – Men's aerials =

Men's aerials at the XXIII Olympic Winter Games
- Venue: Bogwang Phoenix Park, Pyeongchang, South Korea
- Dates: 17 February 2018 (qualification); 18 February 2018 (final)
- Competitors: 25 from 11 nations

Medalists
1st place, gold medalist(s)		Oleksandr Abramenko	Ukraine
2nd place, silver medalist(s)		Jia Zongyang	China
3rd place, bronze medalist(s)		Ilya Burov	Olympic Athletes from Russia

The men's aerials event in freestyle skiing at the 2018 Winter Olympics took place on 17 and 18 February 2018 at the Bogwang Phoenix Park, Pyeongchang, South Korea.

== Qualification ==
The top 25 athletes in the Olympic quota allocation list qualified, with a maximum of four athletes per National Olympic Committee (NOC) allowed. All athletes qualifying must also have placed in the top 30 FIS World Cup event or FIS Freestyle World Ski Championships during the qualification period (1 July 2016 to 21 January 2018) and also have a minimum of 80 FIS points to compete. If the host country, South Korea at the 2018 Winter Olympics did not qualify, their chosen athlete would displace the last qualified athlete, granted all qualification criterion was met.

== Results ==
=== Qualification ===
The qualification was held on 17 February at 20:00.

Rank	Bib	Name	Country	Score	Note
1	10	Jonathon Lillis	United States	127.44	Q
2	5	Qi Guangpu	China	126.70	Q
3	2	Jia Zongyang	China	126.55	Q
4	15	Stanislau Hladchenko	Belarus	126.11	Q
5	16	Pavel Krotov	Olympic Athletes from Russia	124.89	Q
6	8	Olivier Rochon	Canada	124.34	Q
7	25	Dimitri Isler	Switzerland	123.98	
8	7	Ilya Burov	Olympic Athletes from Russia	123.98	
9	6	Oleksandr Abramenko	Ukraine	123.01	
10	13	Wang Xindi	China	121.24	
11	3	Anton Kushnir	Belarus	120.80	
12	1	Maxim Burov	Olympic Athletes from Russia	117.65	
13	27	Noe Roth	Switzerland	116.06	
14	26	Mischa Gasser	Switzerland	113.72	
15	18	David Morris	Australia	112.83	
16	14	Liu Zhongqing	China	107.08	
17	12	Naoya Tabara	Japan	103.98	
18	4	Maxim Gustik	Belarus	92.92	
19	30	Ildar Badrutdinov	Kazakhstan	89.18	
20	28	Nicolas Gygax	Switzerland	88.29	
21	9	Lewis Irving	Canada	87.17	
22	17	Eric Loughran	United States	86.28	
23	11	Mac Bohonnon	United States	85.97	
24	29	Lloyd Wallace	Great Britain	73.06	
25	19	Stanislav Nikitin	Olympic Athletes from Russia	70.59	

=== Qualification 2 ===
The qualification was held on 17 February at 20:45.

Rank	Bib	Name	Country	Round 1	Round 2	Best	Note
1	7	Ilya Burov	Olympic Athletes from Russia	123.98	126.55	126.55	Q
2	18	David Morris	Australia	112.83	124.89	124.89	Q
3	25	Dimitri Isler	Switzerland	123.98	88.94	123.98	Q
4	6	Oleksandr Abramenko	Ukraine	123.01	123.08	123.08	Q
4	14	Liu Zhongqing	China	107.08	123.08	123.08	Q
6	26	Mischa Gasser	Switzerland	113.72	121.72	121.72	Q
7	3	Anton Kushnir	Belarus	120.80	121.27	121.27	
8	13	Wang Xindi	China	121.24	96.38	121.24	
9	1	Maxim Burov	Olympic Athletes from Russia	117.65	116.37	117.65	
10	27	Noe Roth	Switzerland	116.06	116.64	116.64	
11	11	Mac Bohonnon	United States	85.97	112.39	112.39	
12	19	Stanislav Nikitin	Olympic Athletes from Russia	70.59	111.06	111.06	
13	12	Naoya Tabara	Japan	103.98	78.73	103.98	
14	29	Lloyd Wallace	Great Britain	73.06	100.03	100.03	
15	30	Ildar Badrutdinov	Kazakhstan	89.18	94.47	94.47	
16	4	Maxim Gustik	Belarus	92.92	89.14	92.92	
17	28	Nicolas Gygax	Switzerland	88.29	88.92	88.92	
18	9	Lewis Irving	Canada	87.17	78.73	87.17	
19	17	Eric Loughran	United States	86.28	72.40	86.28	

=== Finals ===
The final was held on 18 February at 20:00.

Rank	Bib	Name	Country	Round 1	Rank	Round 2	Rank	Round 3	Rank
1st place, gold medalist(s)	6	Oleksandr Abramenko	Ukraine	125.67	3	125.79	4	128.51	1
2nd place, silver medalist(s)	2	Jia Zongyang	China	118.55	9	128.76	1	128.05	2
3rd place, bronze medalist(s)	7	Ilya Burov	Olympic Athletes from Russia	122.13	6	123.53	6	122.17	3
4	16	Pavel Krotov	Olympic Athletes from Russia	126.11	2	124.89	5	103.17	4
5	8	Olivier Rochon	Canada	125.67	4	128.05	2	98.11	5
6	15	Stanislau Hladchenko	Belarus	123.01	5	126.70	3	92.61	6
7	5	Qi Guangpu	China	127.44	1	122.17	7	did not advance	
8	10	Jonathon Lillis	United States	121.68	7	95.47	8	did not advance	
9	14	Liu Zhongqing	China	119.47	8	94.57	9	did not advance	
10	18	David Morris	Australia	111.95	10	did not advance			
11	26	Mischa Gasser	Switzerland	99.12	11	did not advance			
12	25	Dimitri Isler	Switzerland	97.79	12	did not advance			
