= FIS Freestyle World Ski Championships 2011 – Men's aerials =

The men's aerials competition of the FIS Freestyle World Ski Championships 2011 was held at Deer Valley, United States on February 4, 2011 (qualifications and finals).

== Qualification ==
The following are the results of the qualification.

Rank	Bib	Name	Country	Jump 1	Jump 2	Total	Notes
1	1	Qi Guangpu	China	125.67	131.67	257.34	Q
2	4	Warren Shouldice	Canada	124.78	120.44	245.22	Q
3	3	Renato Ulrich	Switzerland	122.13	121.27	243.40	Q
4	6	Oleksandr Abramenko	Ukraine	117.26	115.64	232.90	Q
5	5	Anton Kushnir	Belarus	100.00	132.13	232.13	Q
6	25	Denis Osipau	Belarus	120.44	110.36	230.80	Q
7	20	Travis Gerrits	Canada	114.41	116.06	230.47	Q
8	21	Stanislav Kravchuk	Ukraine	123.23	102.28	225.51	Q
9	14	Enver Ablaev	Ukraine	111.68	109.75	221.43	Q
10	9	Maxim Gustik	Belarus	109.80	108.54	218.34	Q
11	12	Christian Haechler	Switzerland	106.86	108.94	215.80	Q
12	33	Nevin Brown	United States	110.76	104.31	215.07	Q
12	34	Guillaume Lebert	France	109.36	105.71	215.07	Q
14	23	Jean-Christophe Andre	Canada	107.52	103.54	211.06	
15	15	David Morris	Australia	116.82	92.94	209.76	
16	16	Remi Belanger	Canada	111.98	92.05	204.03	
17	32	Ilya Burov	Russia	106.51	96.90	203.41	
18	11	Andreas Isoz	Switzerland	96.46	106.51	202.97	
19	26	Pavel Krotov	Russia	99.42	102.03	201.45	
20	24	Zhou Hang	China	105.90	94.43	200.33	
21	8	Wu Chao	China	82.52	116.51	199.03	
22	7	Ryan St. Onge	United States	87.83	105.43	193.26	
23	10	Thomas Lambert	Switzerland	105.02	84.16	189.18	
24	13	Scotty Bahrke	United States	80.53	108.60	189.13	
25	30	Petr Medulich	Russia	76.82	104.49	181.31	
26	17	Dylan Ferguson	United States	81.19	99.32	180.51	
27	22	Li Ke	China	92.76	84.33	177.09	
28	28	Matthew DePeters	United States	68.36	68.04	136.40	
29	27	Roman Dobransky	Czech Republic	60.63	65.97	126.60	
30	29	Clyde Getty	Argentina	64.92	20.88	85.80	
	19	Sergii Lysianskyi	Ukraine			DNS	

== Final ==
The following are the results of the final.

Rank	Bib	Name	Country	Total
1st place, gold medalist(s)	4	Warren Shouldice	Canada	253.66
2nd place, silver medalist(s)	1	Qi Guangpu	China	250.95
3rd place, bronze medalist(s)	5	Anton Kushnir	Belarus	249.63
4	3	Renato Ulrich	Switzerland	244.34
5	34	Guillaume Lebert	France	242.18
6	25	Denis Usipau	Belarus	240.80
7	20	Travis Gerrits	Canada	230.45
8	6	Oleksandr Abramenko	Ukraine	227.12
9	12	Christian Haechler	Switzerland	226.90
10	21	Stanislav Kravchuk	Ukraine	193.95
11	14	Enver Ablaev	Ukraine	187.13
12	9	Maxim Gustik	Belarus	178.10
13	33	Nevin Brown	United States	163.61
