= Nicholas Novak =

Czech-American freestyle skier (born 1996)

Personal information
- Nationality: Czech, American
- Born: March 15, 1996 (age 30) Richmond, Virginia, U.S.

Sport
- Country: Czech Republic; United States
- Sport: Freestyle skiing
- Event: Aerials
Medal record
Men's freestyle skiing
Representing the United States

Nicholas Novak (born March 15, 1996) is a Czech-American freestyle skier. He was born in Richmond, Virginia and won a bronze medal for the US at the 2018 National Championships and achieved several top-10 finishes at World Cups, as well as several podium finishes at the Nor-Am Cup. He switched to representing the Czech Republic, the birth country of his parents, in 2021. He competed at the 2026 Winter Olympics as the Czech team's sole male freestyle skier.

== Early life ==
Novak was born in Richmond, Virginia to Jaroslav and Jaroslava Novak, who were both former national trampolinists for Czechoslovakia during the 1980s but were prevented from competing in the Olympic Games due to the country being under Communist rule. After having Nick's older brother, Lukas, his fled Czechoslovakia in 1985 by joining a traveling circus and fleeing to Switzerland after a finishing show in Portugal. The Novaks subsequently moved to West Germany before applying for asylum in the United States, where they worked in gymnastics and the family moved between the US and Australia for several years, with Jaroslava later giving birth to another boy, Thomas. A few years after Jaroslav secured a job in Virginia, Nick was born. All three Novak brothers were high-level gymnasts, but Lukas and Thomas eventually switched to different athletic careers, while Nick was accepted to an Elite Aerial Development Program in New York City which in high school, which allowed him to combine his gymnastic background with skiing, leading to the beginning of his aerial career.

== Career ==
Novak was recruited to the United States Ski Team. In January 2019, he was named to the United States Ski Team for the Freestyle Ski and Snowboarding World Championships alongside Jonathon Lillis, Christopher Lillis, Alex Bowen, and Eric Loughran. He finished in last place, with a total of 43.33 points. During the 2019 Freestyle World Cup, Novak gradually improved throughout the season's four events, placing 22nd, in Moscow, 19th in Minsk, and 17th in China. During the final aerial event of the Cup on March 3, 2019, which also took place in China, Novak came sixth, the highest placement for an American male athlete in that event. Of his achievement, U.S. Ski & Snowboard Head Aerials Coach Todd Ossian stated, “Nick was one of the great stories about today, to come back from his crash yesterday and be our top man”.

Novak began representing the Czech Republic as of the 2021–22 FIS Freestyle Ski World Cup. He was named to the Czech Republic Olympic Team as the only male freestyle skier on January 23, 2026. Posting on Instagram, Novak stated, "I have been named to my first Olympic team to represent Czech Republic in the 2026 Olympic Games in Milan, Italy. It’s been a wild ride and I’m so excited to be able to share this experience with my father and coach. From teaching me to ski, to sharing the Olympic stage, it’s been an honor to be on this journey together." Novak competed in the men's aerials event on February 20, 2026, and scored a total of 76.11 during the qualification, placing 22nd in total.

== Personal life ==
Novak is openly bisexual. He has developed a large following on social media, with almost one million followers on TikTok, and 131,000 on Instagram.

== Career results ==
=== Olympic Games ===
Year	Event	Location	Result	Position	Ref
2026	Men's aerials	(Italy) Livigno	76.11	22nd	

=== World Championships ===
Year	Event	Location	Result	Position	Ref
Representing United States
2019	Men's aerials	(United States) Utah	43.33	25th	
Representing Czech Republic
2023	Men's aerials	(Georgia (country)) Bakuriani	81.40	20th	
2025	Men's aerials	(Switzerland) Corviglia	63.99	22nd	

=== World Cups (Men's aerials) ===
Year	Location	Result	Position
Representing United States
2016	(United States) Deer Valley	68.78	30th
2017	(United States) Deer Valley	79.78	23rd
2018	(United States) Deer Valley	76.55	32nd
2018	(United States) Lake Placid	102.66	13th
2018	(United States) Lake Placid	260.00	10th
2019	(United States) Lake Placid	—N/a	DNF
2019	(Russia) Moscow	75.66	22nd
2019	(Belarus) Minsk	120.00	19th
2019	(China) Shimao Lotus Mountain	73.30	17th
2019	(China) Shimao Lotus Mountain	400.00	6th
2020	(United States) Deer Valley	53.10	12th
2021	(United States) Deer Valley	24.33	25th
Representing Czech Republic
2021	(Finland) Ruka	67.63	35th
2021	(Finland) Ruka	104.49	14th
2021	(Finland) Ruka	84.64	30th
2021	(Finland) Ruka	108.85	23rd
2022	(Canada) Le Relais	130.00	18th
2022	(United States) Deer Valley	102.66	22nd
2023	(Canada) Le Relais	84.64	16th
2023	(Canada) Le Relais	87.49	9th
2023	(United States) Deer Valley	75.33	29th
2023	(Georgia (country)) Bakuriani	81.40	20th
2023	(Finland) Ruka	96.46	15th
2024	(United States) Deer Valley	320.00	8th
2024	(Canada) Lac-Beauport	59.13	28th
2024	(Canada) Lac-Beauport	73.45	26th
2025	(United States) Lake Placid	81.40	24th
2025	(Canada) Lac-Beauport	78.31	27th
2025	(Canada) Lac-Beauport	88.05	21st
2025	(United States) Deer Valley	89.50	12th
2025	(China) Beidahu	92.48	18th
2025	(Kazakhstan) Almaty	99.22	8th
2025	(Italy) Livigno	68.14	19th
2025	(Finland) Ruka	82.21	22nd
2025	(China) Secret Garden	70.80	32nd
2026	(Canada) Lac-Beauport	81.42	25th
2026	(Canada) Lac-Beauport	73.45	32nd
2026	(United States) Lake Placid	52.24	37th
2026	(United States) Lake Placid	80.59	26th

=== European Cups ===
Year	Location	Result	Position
2015	(Switzerland) Airolo	70.40	12th
2015	(Switzerland) Airolo	160.10	9th
2015	(Italy) Chiesa in Valmalenco	168.48	7th
2015	(Italy) Chiesa in Valmalenco	166.37	10th

=== US National Championships (Men's aerials) ===
Year	Location	Result	Position
2012	(United States) Stratton, Vermont	46.80	18th
2013	(United States) Heavenly, California	57.60	15th
2014	(United States) Deer Valley, Utah	90.00	5th
2015	(United States) Steamboat Springs, Colorado	144.00	6th
2016	(United States) Steamboat Springs, Colorado	116.00	6th
2017	(United States) Lake Placid, New York	64.80	14th
2018	(United States) Park City, Utah	174.00	3rd
2019	(United States) Lake Placid, New York	144.00	6th
2021	(United States) Park City, Utah	—N/a	DNS
