= FIS Freestyle Ski and Snowboarding World Championships 2021 – Men's aerials =

Men's aerials at the FIS Freestyle Ski and Snowboarding World Championships 2021
- Venue: Shymbulak
- Location: Almaty, Kazakhstan
- Date: 10 March 2021
- Competitors: 27 from 8 nations
- Winning points: 135.00

Medalists
gold medal	Maxim Burov
silver medal	Christopher Lillis	United States
bronze medal	Pavel Krotov

The Men's aerials competition at the FIS Freestyle Ski and Snowboarding World Championships 2021 was held on 10 March 2021.

== Qualification ==
The qualification was started at 12:25. The 12 best skiers qualified for the final.

Rank	Bib	Start order	Name	Country	Q1	Q2	Notes
1	2	1	Noé Roth	Switzerland	121.68		Q
2	3	12	Pavel Krotov	Russian Ski Federation	121.24		Q
3	6	17	Pirmin Werner	Switzerland	121.24		Q
4	13	9	Eric Loughran	United States	119.91		Q
5	12	15	Nicolas Gygax	Switzerland	118.59		Q
6	1	27	Maxim Burov	Russian Ski Federation	117.26		Q
7	8	3	Ilya Burov	Russian Ski Federation	116.74	122.17	Q
8	10	4	Christopher Lillis	United States	115.38	120.36	Q
9	15	13	Oleksandr Abramenko	Ukraine	116.82	104.52	Q
10	22	19	Dmytro Kotovskyi	Ukraine	76.55	114.03	Q
11	24	24	Oleksandr Okipniuk	Ukraine	111.51	105.43	Q
12	18	18	Andrin Schädler	Switzerland	105.31	110.56	Q
13	14	21	Pavel Dzik	Belarus	103.27	110.18	
14	7	20	Lewis Irving	Canada	64.60	109.95	
15	19	26	Lloyd Wallace	Great Britain	95.58	107.32	
16	9	16	Makar Mitrafanau	Belarus	98.82	104.88	
17	4	2	Justin Schoenefeld	United States	104.87	85.52	
18	5	23	Stanislav Nikitin	Russian Ski Federation	104.43	96.83	
19	32	6	Sherzod Khashyrbayev	Kazakhstan	101.65	94.24	
20	11	28	Maxim Gustik	Belarus	70.80	100.84	
21	26	11	Stanislau Hladchenka	Belarus	99.56	89.14	
22	25	22	Miha Fontaine	Canada	69.03	96.58	
23	17	8	Émile Nadeau	Canada	96.33	93.76	
24	27	5	Alexandre Duchaine	Canada	54.99	95.17	
25	31	10	Nurlan Batyrbayev	Kazakhstan	86.36	80.95	
26	30	25	Mykola Puzderko	Ukraine	76.14	64.60	
27	29	7	Roman Ivanov	Kazakhstan	41.89	53.22	
	28	14	Ildar Badrutdinov	Kazakhstan	Did not start		

== Final ==
The final was started at 15:20.

Rank	Bib	Name	Country	Final 1			Final 2	Notes
Rank	Bib	Name	Country	Jump 1	Jump 2	Best	Final 2	Notes
1st place, gold medalist(s)	1	Maxim Burov	Russian Ski Federation	120.36	122.17	122.17	135.00	
2nd place, silver medalist(s)	10	Christopher Lillis	United States	DNS	120.36	120.36	133.50	
3rd place, bronze medalist(s)	3	Pavel Krotov	Russian Ski Federation	111.76	121.24	121.24	127.50	
4	6	Pirmin Werner	Switzerland	120.81	101.65	120.81	113.72	
5	8	Ilya Burov	Russian Ski Federation	104.98	120.81	120.81	83.00	
6	22	Dmytro Kotovskyi	Ukraine	117.26	119.46	119.46	82.00	
7	2	Noé Roth	Switzerland	118.59	119.00	119.00	—	Tie 18.80
8	13	Eric Loughran	United States	86.28	119.00	119.00	—	Tie 18.60
9	12	Nicolas Gygax	Switzerland	119.00	114.60	119.00	—	Tie 18.20
10	15	Oleksandr Abramenko	Ukraine	78.32	113.57	113.57	—	
11	18	Andrin Schädler	Switzerland	90.27	111.37	111.37	—	
12	24	Oleksandr Okipniuk	Ukraine	84.96	72.85	84.96	—	
