= Freestyle skiing at the 2022 Winter Olympics – Men's aerials =

Men's aerials at the XXIV Olympic Winter Games
- Freestyle skiing
- Venue: Genting Snow Park, Zhangjiakou
- Date: 15, 16 February 2022
- Competitors: 24 from 9 nations
- Winning points: 129.00

Medalists
| 1st place, gold medalist(s) | | Qi Guangpu | China |
| 2nd place, silver medalist(s) | | Oleksandr Abramenko | Ukraine |
| 3rd place, bronze medalist(s) | | Ilya Burov | ROC |

The men's aerials competition in freestyle skiing at the 2022 Winter Olympics was held on 15 February (qualification) and 16 February (final), at the Genting Snow Park in Zhangjiakou. Qi Guangpu of China won the event; this was his first Olympic gold medal. Oleksandr Abramenko of Ukraine, the defending champion, won the silver medal, and Ilya Burov, representing the Russian Olympic Committee, won bronze, replicating his 2018 achievement.

The 2018 silver medalist Jia Zongyang was competing as well. At the 2021–22 FIS Freestyle Ski World Cup, there were six events before the Olympics, and only Russians, Chinese, and Swiss skiers made it to the top three at any of them. Four events were won by Maxim Burov, the brother of Ilya Burov, and he was leading the rankings, followed by four Chinese athletes. Sun Jiaxu was ranked second, and Jia Zongyang third. Maxim Burov is also the 2021 world champion.

== Qualification ==
A total of 25 aerialists qualified to compete at the games. For an athlete to compete they must have a minimum of 80.00 FIS points on the FIS Points List on January 17, 2022 and a top 30 finish in a World Cup event or at the FIS Freestyle Ski World Championships 2021. A country could enter a maximum of four athletes into the event.

== Results ==
=== Qualification 1 ===
| Rank | Bib | Order | Name | Country | Score | Notes |
|---|---|---|---|---|---|---|
| 1 | 4 | 5 | Qi Guangpu | China | 127.88 | Q |
| 2 | 3 | 14 | Jia Zongyang | China | 125.67 | Q |
| 3 | 7 | 15 | Noé Roth | Switzerland | 123.08 | Q |
| 4 | 9 | 24 | Eric Loughran | United States | 121.24 | Q |
| 5 | 13 | 7 | Oleksandr Abramenko | Ukraine | 120.36 | Q |
| 6 | 20 | 12 | Christopher Lillis | United States | 119.91 | Q |
| 7 | 10 | 3 | Stanislav Nikitin | ROC | 119.47 | |
| 8 | 15 | 17 | Justin Schoenefeld | United States | 118.59 | |
| 9 | 17 | 23 | Ilya Burov | ROC | 117.65 | |
| 10 | 19 | 21 | Stanislau Hladchenka | Belarus | 115.49 | |
| 11 | 14 | 6 | Miha Fontaine | Canada | 115.05 | |
| 12 | 6 | 22 | Wang Xindi | China | 114.60 | |
| 13 | 16 | 8 | Émile Nadeau | Canada | 112.83 | |
| 14 | 5 | 11 | Pirmin Werner | Switzerland | 112.22 | |
| 15 | 12 | 20 | Sherzod Khashyrbayev | Kazakhstan | 109.74 | |
| 16 | 21 | 19 | Maksim Gustik | Belarus | 109.74 | |
| 17 | 23 | 16 | Lloyd Wallace | Great Britain | 108.41 | |
| 18 | 22 | 9 | Pavel Dzik | Belarus | 106.20 | |
| 19 | 25 | 13 | Lewis Irving | Canada | 103.98 | |
| 20 | 11 | 10 | Nicolas Gygax | Switzerland | 101.77 | |
| 21 | 1 | 2 | Maxim Burov | ROC | 95.02 | |
| 22 | 18 | 18 | Oleksandr Okipniuk | Ukraine | 92.76 | |
| 23 | 2 | 4 | Sun Jiaxu | China | 85.40 | |
| 24 | 8 | 1 | Dmytro Kotovskyi | Ukraine | 73.89 | |

=== Qualification 2 ===
| Rank | Bib | Order | Name | Country | Round 1 | Round 2 | Best | Notes |
|---|---|---|---|---|---|---|---|---|
| 1 | 18 | 13 | Oleksandr Okipniuk | Ukraine | 92.76 | 125.00 | 125.00 | Q |
| 2 | 5 | 9 | Pirmin Werner | Switzerland | 112.22 | 123.45 | 123.45 | Q |
| 3 | 17 | 18 | Ilya Burov | ROC | 117.65 | 120.36 | 120.36 | Q |
| 4 | 10 | 3 | Stanislav Nikitin | ROC | 119.47 | 86.88 | 119.47 | Q |
| 5 | 15 | 12 | Justin Schoenefeld | United States | 118.59 | 105.88 | 118.59 | Q |
| 6 | 19 | 16 | Stanislau Hladchenka | Belarus | 115.49 | 107.69 | 115.49 | Q |
| 7 | 14 | 5 | Miha Fontaine | Canada | 115.05 | 107.69 | 115.05 | |
| 8 | 6 | 17 | Wang Xindi | China | 114.60 | 98.19 | 114.60 | |
| 9 | 8 | 1 | Dmytro Kotovskyi | Ukraine | 73.89 | 114.03 | 114.03 | |
| 10 | 1 | 2 | Maxim Burov | ROC | 95.02 | 113.28 | 113.28 | |
| 11 | 16 | 6 | Émile Nadeau | Canada | 112.83 | 102.26 | 112.83 | |
| 12 | 2 | 4 | Sun Jiaxu | China | 85.40 | 110.86 | 110.86 | |
| 13 | 12 | 15 | Sherzod Khashyrbayev | Kazakhstan | 109.74 | 69.23 | 109.74 | |
| 14 | 21 | 14 | Maksim Gustik | Belarus | 109.74 | 97.20 | 109.74 | |
| 15 | 23 | 11 | Lloyd Wallace | Great Britain | 108.41 | 71.94 | 108.41 | |
| 16 | 22 | 7 | Pavel Dzik | Belarus | 106.20 | 81.45 | 106.20 | |
| 17 | 25 | 10 | Lewis Irving | Canada | 103.98 | 80.99 | 103.98 | |
| 18 | 11 | 8 | Nicolas Gygax | Switzerland | 101.77 | 103.62 | 103.62 | |

=== Finals ===
| Rank | Bib | Name | Country | Final 1 | | | Final 2 |
| Rank | Bib | Name | Country | Jump 1 | Jump 2 | Best | Final 2 |
|---|---|---|---|---|---|---|---|
| 1st place, gold medalist(s) | 4 | Qi Guangpu | China | 125.22 | 114.48 | 125.22 | 129.00 |
| 2nd place, silver medalist(s) | 13 | Oleksandr Abramenko | Ukraine | 123.53 | 113.57 | 123.53 | 116.50 |
| 3rd place, bronze medalist(s) | 17 | Ilya Burov | ROC | 109.05 | 129.50 | 129.50 | 114.93 |
| 4 | 5 | Pirmin Werner | Switzerland | 126.24 | 114.93 | 126.24 | 111.50 |
| 5 | 15 | Justin Schoenefeld | United States | 120.36 | 123.53 | 123.53 | 106.50 |
| 6 | 20 | Christopher Lillis | United States | 125.67 | 122.17 | 125.67 | 103.00 |
| 7 | 3 | Jia Zongyang | China | 123.45 | 88.69 | 123.45 | did not advance |
| 8 | 7 | Noé Roth | Switzerland | 122.13 | 110.41 | 122.13 | did not advance |
| 9 | 18 | Oleksandr Okipniuk | Ukraine | 91.40 | 122.01 | 122.01 | did not advance |
| 10 | 10 | Stanislav Nikitin | ROC | 117.26 | 119.00 | 119.00 | did not advance |
| 11 | 19 | Stanislau Hladchenka | Belarus | 115.93 | 116.29 | 116.29 | did not advance |
| 12 | 9 | Eric Loughran | United States | 111.95 | 90.50 | 111.95 | did not advance |
