= 2014–15 FIS Freestyle Skiing World Cup =

Freestyle skiing competitive season

Freestyle Skiing World Cup 2014/15
Discipline	Men	Women
Overall	(Canada) Mikaël Kingsbury	(United States) Hannah Kearney
Moguls	(Canada) Mikaël Kingsbury	(United States) Hannah Kearney
Aerials	(United States) Mac Bohonnon	(United States) Kiley McKinnon
Ski Cross	(France) Jean Frederic Chapuis	(Sweden) Anna Holmlund
Halfpipe	(United States) David Wise	(Japan) Ayana Onozuka
Slopestyle	(Norway) Felix Stridsberg-Usterud	(Sweden) Emma Dahlström
- Nations Cup: Canada

Competition
Locations	19	19
Individual	32	32
Team	2	2
Cancelled	4	4

The 2014/15 FIS Freestyle Skiing World Cup was the thirty sixth World Cup season in freestyle skiing organised by International Ski Federation. The season started on 5 December 2014 and ended on 15 March 2015. This season included five disciplines: moguls, aerials, ski cross, halfpipe and slopestyle.

== Men ==
=== Ski Cross ===
Num	Season	Date	Place	Event	Winner	Second	Third	Ref.
96	1	6 December 2014	(Canada) Nakiska	SX	(Austria) Thomas Zangerl	(Sweden) Victor Öhling Norberg	(Switzerland) Armin Niederer	
		12 December 2014	(France) Val Thorens	SX	rescheduled to Val Thorens			
		13 December 2014	(France) Val Thorens	SX	rescheduled to Val Thorens			
		21 December 2014	(Italy) Innichen	SX	lack of snow; rescheduled to Arosa			
97	2	9 January 2015 (Note: Originally scheduled ski cross event for men cancelled because of weather on 12 December 2014 in Val Thorens was instead rescheduled on 9 January 2015 also in Val Thorens.)	(France) Val Thorens	SX	(Germany) Andreas Schauer	(France) Jean-Frédéric Chapuis	(Austria) Johannes Rohrweck	
98	3	10 January 2015 (Note: Originally scheduled ski cross event for men cancelled because of weather on 13 December 2014 in Val Thorens was instead rescheduled on 10 January 2015 also in Val Thorens.)	(France) Val Thorens	SX	(Switzerland) Marc Bischofberger	(France) Jonathan Midol	(Canada) Brady Leman	
99	4	6 February 2015 (Note: Ski cross event for men cancelled because of lack of snow on 21 December 2014 in Innichen was replaced on 6 February 2015 in Arosa.)	(Switzerland) Arosa	SX	(Sweden) Victor Öhling Norberg	(Russia) Sergey Ridzik	(France) Bastien Midol	
100	5	7 February 2015	(Switzerland) Arosa	SX	(Sweden) Victor Öhling Norberg	(Russia) Sergey Ridzik	(Germany) Daniel Bohnacker	
101	6	14 February 2015	(Sweden) Åre	SX	(Sweden) Victor Öhling Norberg	(France) Jean-Frédéric Chapuis	(Sweden) Michael Forslund	
102	7	15 February 2015	(Sweden) Åre	SX	(France) Jean-Frédéric Chapuis	(Switzerland) Alex Fiva	(Germany) Paul Eckert	
103	8	21 February 2015 (Note: Originally scheduled ski cross event for men on 31 January 2015 in Tegernsee was instead rescheduled on 21 February 2015 also in Tegernsee.)	(Germany) Tegernsee	SX	(France) Jean-Frédéric Chapuis	(Germany) Daniel Bohnacker	(Sweden) Victor Öhling Norberg	
104	9	22 February 2015 (Note: Originally scheduled ski cross event for men on 1 February 2015 in Tegernsee was instead rescheduled on 22 February 2015 also in Tegernsee.)	(Germany) Tegernsee	SX	(France) Jean-Frédéric Chapuis	(Slovenia) Filip Flisar	(Sweden) Viktor Andersson	
		6 March 2015	(United States) Squaw Valley	SX	cancelled			
105	10	13 March 2015 (Note: Ski cross event for men cancelled on 6 March 2015 in Squaw Valley was replaced on 13 March 2015 also in Megève.)	(France) Megève	SX	(France) Sylvain Miaillier	(France) Bastien Midol	(France) Jean-Frédéric Chapuis	
106	11	14 March 2015	(France) Megève	SX	(France) Jean-Frédéric Chapuis	(Canada) Brady Leman	(Germany) Paul Eckert	

=== Moguls ===
Num	Season	Date	Place	Event	Winner	Second	Third	Ref.
57	1	13 December 2014 (Note: Originally scheduled moguls event for men on 13 December 2014 in Ruka was instead replaced with dual moguls event.)	(Finland) Ruka	DM	(Canada) Philippe Marquis	(Japan) Sho Endo	(France) Anthony Benna	
58	2	10 January 2015	(United States) Deer Valley	DM	(Canada) Mikaël Kingsbury	(United States) Dylan Walczyk	(Switzerland) Marco Tadé	
59	3	1 March 2015	(Japan) Tazawako	DM	(Canada) Mikaël Kingsbury	(Canada) Philippe Marquis	(Australia) Matt Graham	
60	4	15 March 2015	(France) Megève	DM	(France) Anthony Benna	(United States) Thomas Rowley	(Russia) Alexandr Smyshlyaev	
308	1	3 January 2015	(Canada) Calgary	MO	(Canada) Mikaël Kingsbury	(Canada) Simon Pouliot-Cavanagh	(Japan) Sho Endo	
309	2	9 January 2015	(United States) Deer Valley	MO	(Canada) Mikaël Kingsbury	(Australia) Matt Graham	(United States) Patrick Deneen	
310	3	29 January 2015	(United States) Lake Placid	MO	(Canada) Mikaël Kingsbury	(Russia) Alexandr Smyshlyaev	(Canada) Marc-Antoine Gagnon	
311	4	7 February 2015	(Canada) Val St. Come	MO	(Canada) Mikaël Kingsbury	(Australia) Matt Graham	(Russia) Alexandr Smyshlyaev	
312	5	28 February 2015	(Japan) Tazawako	MO	(Canada) Mikaël Kingsbury	(United States) Jeremy Cota	(Russia) Alexandr Smyshlyaev	

=== Aerials ===
Num	Season	Date	Place	Event	Winner	Second	Third	Ref.
305	1	20 December 2014	(China) Beijing	AE	(China) Guangpu Qi	(Russia) Pavel Krotov	(Russia) Ilya Burov	
306	2	21 December 2014	(China) Beijing	AE	(China) Guangpu Qi	(China) Hang Zhou	(United States) Mac Bohonnon	
307	3	8 January 2015	(United States) Deer Valley	AE	(China) Guangpu Qi	(United States) Mac Bohonnon	(Ukraine) Oleksandr Abramenko	
308	4	30 January 2015	(United States) Lake Placid	AE	(United States) Mac Bohonnon	(China) Hang Zhou	(China) Guangpu Qi	
309	5	31 January 2015	(United States) Lake Placid	AE	(China) Hang Zhou	(China) Guangpu Qi	(Russia) Ilya Burov	
310	6	21 February 2015	(Russia) Moscow	AE	(United States) Mac Bohonnon	(Russia) Ilya Burov	(Belarus) Maxim Gustik	
311	7	1 March 2015	(Belarus) Minsk	AE	(Ukraine) Oleksandr Abramenko	(United States) Mac Bohonnon	(Belarus) Denis Osipau	

=== Halfpipe ===
Num	Season	Date	Place	Event	Winner	Second	Third	Ref.
27	1	5 December 2014	(United States) Copper Mountain	HP	(United States) David Wise	(United States) Torin Yater-Wallace	(France) Benoit Valentin	
28	2	28 February 2015	(United States) Park City	HP	(United States) Gus Kenworthy	(France) Kevin Rolland	(United States) David Wise	
29	3	12 March 2015	(France) Tignes	HP	(Canada) Mike Riddle	(United States) David Wise	(United States) Alex Ferreira	

=== Slopestyle ===
Num	Season	Date	Place	Event	Winner	Second	Third	Ref.
12	1	27 February 2015	(United States) Park City	SS	(United States) Joss Christensen	(United States) Mcrae Williams	(United States) Gus Kenworthy	
13	2	14 March 2015	(Switzerland) Silvaplana	SS	(Norway) Felix Stridsberg-Usterud	(Switzerland) Andri Ragettli	(Switzerland) Luca Schuler	

== Ladies ==
=== Ski Cross ===
Num	Season	Date	Place	Event	Winner	Second	Third	Ref.
97	1	6 December 2014	(Canada) Nakiska	SX	(Canada) Marielle Thompson	(Canada) Georgia Simmerling	(Switzerland) Fanny Smith	
		12 December 2014	(France) Val Thorens	SX	rescheduled to Val Thorens			
		13 December 2014	(France) Val Thorens	SX	rescheduled to Val Thorens			
		21 December 2014	(Italy) Innichen	SX	lack of snow; rescheduled to Arosa			
98	2	9 January 2015 (Note: Originally scheduled ski cross event for ladies cancelled because of weather on 12 December 2014 in Val Thorens was instead rescheduled on 9 January 2015 also in Val Thorens.)	(France) Val Thorens	SX	(Canada) Marielle Thompson	(Canada) Georgia Simmerling	(France) Alizée Baron	
99	3	10 January 2015 (Note: Originally scheduled ski cross event for ladies cancelled because of weather on 13 December 2014 in Val Thorens was instead rescheduled on 10 January 2015 also in Val Thorens.)	(France) Val Thorens	SX	(Canada) Marielle Thompson	(Sweden) Anna Holmlund	(France) Ophélie David	
100	4	6 February 2015 (Note: Ski cross event for men cancelled because of lack of snow on 21 December 2014 in Innichen was replaced on 6 February 2015 in Arosa.)	(Switzerland) Arosa	SX	(Switzerland) Fanny Smith	(Sweden) Anna Holmlund	(France) Ophélie David	
101	5	7 February 2015	(Switzerland) Arosa	SX	(Switzerland) Fanny Smith	(Sweden) Anna Holmlund	(Russia) Sofia Smirnova	
102	6	14 February 2015	(Sweden) Åre	SX	(France) Alizée Baron	(Austria) Katrin Ofner	(Austria) Andrea Limbacher	
103	7	15 February 2015	(Sweden) Åre	SX	(Sweden) Anna Holmlund	(Czech Republic) Andrea Zemanová	(Austria) Andrea Limbacher	
104	8	21 February 2015 (Note: Originally scheduled ski cross event for ladies on 31 January 2015 in Tegernsee was instead rescheduled on 21 February 2015 also in Tegernsee.)	(Germany) Tegernsee	SX	(Switzerland) Fanny Smith	(France) Alizée Baron	(Sweden) Anna Holmlund	
105	9	22 February 2015 (Note: Originally scheduled ski cross event for ladies on 1 February 2015 in Tegernsee was instead rescheduled on 22 February 2015 also in Tegernsee.)	(Germany) Tegernsee	SX	(Sweden) Anna Holmlund	(Austria) Andrea Limbacher	(France) Ophélie David	
		6 March 2015	(United States) Squaw Valley	SX	cancelled			
106	10	13 March 2015 (Note: Ski cross event for ladies cancelled on 6 March 2015 in Squaw Valley was replaced on 13 March 2015 also in Megève.)	(France) Megève	SX	(Sweden) Anna Holmlund	(Austria) Katrin Ofner	(Norway) Marte Hoeie Gjefsen	
107	11	14 March 2015	(France) Megève	SX	(Sweden) Anna Holmlund	(Austria) Andrea Limbacher	(France) Ophélie David	

=== Moguls ===
Num	Season	Date	Place	Event	Winner	Second	Third	Ref.
56	1	13 December 2014	(Finland) Ruka	DM	(Kazakhstan) Yuliya Galysheva	(Canada) Chloé Dufour-Lapointe	(United States) Hannah Kearney	
57	2	10 January 2015	(United States) Deer Valley	DM	(Canada) Justine Dufour-Lapointe	(United States) Hannah Kearney	(Australia) Britteny Cox	
58	3	1 March 2015	(Japan) Tazawako	DM	(United States) Morgan Schild	(Japan) Satsuki Ito	(United States) Hannah Kearney	
59	4	15 March 2015	(France) Megève	DM	(United States) Hannah Kearney	(Canada) Chloé Dufour-Lapointe	(Canada) Justine Dufour-Lapointe	
309	1	3 January 2015	(Canada) Calgary	MO	(United States) Hannah Kearney	(Canada) Chloé Dufour-Lapointe	(Canada) Justine Dufour-Lapointe	
310	2	9 January 2015	(United States) Deer Valley	MO	(United States) K.C. Oakley	(Canada) Justine Dufour-Lapointe	(Canada) Chloé Dufour-Lapointe	
311	3	29 January 2015	(United States) Lake Placid	MO	(Canada) Justine Dufour-Lapointe	(United States) Hannah Kearney	(Canada) Andi Naude	
312	4	7 February 2015	(Canada) Val St. Come	MO	(United States) Hannah Kearney	(Canada) Chloé Dufour-Lapointe	(Canada) Audrey Robichaud	
313	5	28 February 2015	(Japan) Tazawako	MO	(United States) Hannah Kearney	(Japan) Junko Hoshino	(Canada) Audrey Robichaud	

=== Aerials ===
Num	Season	Date	Place	Event	Winner	Second	Third	Ref.
308	1	20 December 2014	(China) Beijing	AE	(China) Mengtao Xu	(Australia) Danielle Scott	(United States) Kiley McKinnon	
309	2	21 December 2014	(China) Beijing	AE	(China) Mengtao Xu	(United States) Kiley McKinnon	(China) Fanyu Kong	
310	3	8 January 2015	(United States) Deer Valley	AE	(United States) Ashley Caldwell	(United States) Kiley McKinnon	(China) Xiaoxue Shen	
311	4	30 January 2015	(United States) Lake Placid	AE	(Belarus) Aliaksandra Ramanouskaya	(Russia) Veronika Korsunova	(Canada) Mélissa Corbo	
312	5	31 January 2015	(United States) Lake Placid	AE	(Australia) Renee McElduff	(Russia) Veronika Korsunova	(Belarus) Hanna Huskova	
313	6	21 February 2015	(Russia) Moscow	AE	(Australia) Danielle Scott	(United States) Ashley Caldwell	(United States) Kiley McKinnon	
314	7	1 March 2015 (Note: Originally scheduled aerials event for ladies on 28 February 2015 in Minsk was rescheduled to 1 March 2015 also in Minsk.)	(Belarus) Minsk	AE	(United States) Ashley Caldwell	(United States) Kiley McKinnon	(Russia) Veronika Korsunova	

=== Halfpipe ===
Num	Season	Date	Place	Event	Winner	Second	Third	Ref.
27	1	5 December 2014	(United States) Copper Mountain	HP	(New Zealand) Janina Kuzma	(United States) Devin Logan	(Japan) Ayana Onozuka	
28	2	28 February 2015	(United States) Park City	HP	(Japan) Ayana Onozuka	(Germany) Sabrina Cakmakli	(New Zealand) Janina Kuzma	
29	3	12 March 2015	(France) Tignes	HP	(Canada) Cassie Sharpe	(Japan) Ayana Onozuka	(United States) Brita Sigourney	

=== Slopestyle ===
Num	Season	Date	Place	Event	Winner	Second	Third	Ref.
12	1	27 February 2015	(United States) Park City	SS	(Sweden) Emma Dahlstrom	(United States) Devin Logan	(Norway) Tiril Sjaastad Christiansen	
13	2	14 March 2015 (Note: Originally scheduled slopestlye event for ladies on 15 March 2015 in Silvaplana was rescheduled to 14 March 2015 also in Silvaplana.)	(Switzerland) Silvaplana	SS	(Norway) Tiril Sjåstad Christiansen	(Sweden) Emma Dahlström	(Norway) Johanne Killi	

== Team ==
=== Mixed ===
Num	Season	Date	Place	Event	Winner	Second	Third	Ref.
1	1	21 December 2014	(China) Beijing	AET	China I Zongyang Jia; Mengtao Xu; Guangpu Qi	Russia Veronika Korsunova; Ilya Burov; Pavel Krotov	Belarus I Hanna Huskova; Denis Osipau; Maxim Gustik	
2	2	31 January 2015	(United States) Lake Placid	AET	China I Xiaoxue Shen; Guangpu Qi; Hang Zhou	Belarus Hanna Huskova; Stanislau Hladchenko; Denis Osipau	Russia Veronika Korsunova; Pavel Krotov; Ilya Burov	

== Men's standings ==
=== Overall ===
Rank		Points
1	(Canada) Mikaël Kingsbury	84.56
2	(United States) Mac Bohonnon	70.14
3	(France) Jean-Frédéric Chapuis	67.91
4	(China) Guangpu Qi	62.86
5	(Sweden) Victor Öhling Norberg	50.27

- Standings after 32 events.

=== Moguls ===
Rank		Points
1	(Canada) Mikaël Kingsbury	761
2	(Russia) Alexandr Smyshlyaev	430
3	(Canada) Philippe Marquis	426
4	(France) Anthony Benna	347
5	(Australia) Matt Graham	347

- Standings after 9 races.

=== Aerials ===
Rank		Points
1	(United States) Mac Bohonnon	491
2	(China) Guangpu Qi	440
3	(China) Hang Zhou	323
4	(Russia) Ilya Burov	322
5	(Russia) Pavel Krotov	252

- Standings after 7 races.

=== Ski Cross ===
Rank		Points
1	(France) Jean-Frédéric Chapuis	747
2	(Sweden) Victor Öhling Norberg	553
3	(France) Bastien Midol	375
4	(Germany) Paul Eckert	365
5	(France) Sylvain Miaillier	347

- Standings after 11 races.

=== Halfpipe ===
Rank		Points
1	(United States) David Wise	240
2	(United States) Gus Kenworthy	176
3	(France) Kevin Rolland	175
4	(France) Benoit Valentin	150
5	(United States) Alex Ferreira	139

- Standings after 3 races.

=== Slopestyle ===
Rank		Points
1	(Norway) Felix Stridsberg-Usterud	129
2	(United States) Joss Christensen	106
3	(Switzerland) Andri Ragettli	86
4	(United States) Mcrae Williams	80
5	(Switzerland) Luca Schuler	71

- Standings after 2 races.

== Ladies' standings ==
=== Overall ===
Rank		Points
1	(United States) Hannah Kearney	76.22
2	(Sweden) Anna Holmlund	74.09
3	(United States) Kiley Mckinnon	58.14
4	(Canada) Justine Dufour-Lapointe	55.67
5	(Canada) Chloe Dufour-Lapointe	54.78

- Standings after 32 events.

=== Moguls ===
Rank		Points
1	(United States) Hannah Kearney	686
2	(Canada) Justine Dufour-Lapointe	501
3	(Canada) Chloé Dufour-Lapointe	493
4	(Canada) Audrey Robichaud	366
5	(Canada) Andi Naude	327

- Standings after 9 races.

=== Aerials ===
Rank		Points
1	(United States) Kiley McKinnon	407
2	(United States) Ashley Caldwell	324
3	(Australia) Danielle Scott	296
4	(Russia) Veronika Korsunova	277
5	(Belarus) Hanna Huskova	256

- Standings after 7 races.

=== Ski Cross ===
Rank		Points
1	(Sweden) Anna Holmlund	815
2	(France) Alizee Baron	573
3	(Switzerland) Fanny Smith	539
4	(France) Ophelie David	528
5	(Austria) Katrin Ofner	418

- Standings after 11 races.

=== Halfpipe ===
Rank		Points
1	(Japan) Ayana Onozuka	240
2	(New Zealand) Janina Kuzma	200
3	(United States) Devin Logan	175
4	(Canada) Cassie Sharpe	145
5	(Germany) Sabrina Cakmakli	116

- Standings after 3 races.

=== Slopestyle ===
Rank		Points
1	(Sweden) Emma Dahlstrom	180
2	(Norway) Tiril Sjaastad Christiansen	160
3	(Norway) Johanne Killi	100
4	(Switzerland) Giulia Tanno	95
5	(United States) Devin Logan	92

- Standings after 2 races.

== Nations Cup ==
=== Overall ===
Pos.		Points
1	Canada	4983
2	United States	4929
3	France	3787
4	Russia	2708
5	Switzerland	2468

- Standings after 64 events.

=== Men ===
Pos.		Points
1	Canada	2683
2	United States	2352
3	France	2336
4	Russia	1529
5	Switzerland	1365

- Standings after 32 events.

=== Ladies ===
Pos.		Points
1	United States	2577
2	Canada	2300
3	France	1451
4	Russia	1179
5	Sweden	1147

- Standings after 32 events.
