= Freestyle skiing at the 2026 Winter Olympics – Men's aerials =

Men's aerials at the XXV Olympic Winter Games
- Freestyle skiing
- Venue: Livigno Aerials & Moguls Park
- Date: 20 February 2026
- Competitors: 24 from 9 nations
- Winning points: 132.90

Medalists
1st place, gold medalist(s)		Wang Xindi	China
2nd place, silver medalist(s)		Noé Roth	Switzerland
3rd place, bronze medalist(s)		Li Tianma	China

The men's aerials competition in freestyle skiing at the 2026 Winter Olympics was held on 20 February at the Livigno Aerials & Moguls Park in Valtellina. Wang Xindi of China won the event. Noé Roth of Switzerland won the silver medal, and Li Tianma of China won bronze. All of them were first-time Olympic medalists. There were four Chinese skiers in the top six, as the World Cup leader Sun Jiaxu finished fourth and defending champion Qi Guangpu finished sixth.

== Background ==
The defending champion, Qi Guangpu, qualified for the event. The 2022 silver medalist, Oleksandr Abramenko, retired from competitions. The bronze medalist, Ilya Burov, was barred from international competitions after the Russian invasion of Ukraine. Sun Jiaxu was leading the aerials standings of the 2025–26 FIS Freestyle Ski World Cup before the Olympics. Noé Roth was the 2025 World champion. Silver medalist Quinn Dehlinger withdrew due to an injury.

The qualifications were originally set to be held on 17 February, but were then postponed to 19 February due to heavy snowfall, set to take place in the morning followed by the final later in the day. The event was later delayed again to 20 February.

== Results ==
=== Qualification ===
The qualification was held at 10:30.

Rank	Bib	Order	Name	Country	Q1	Q2	Best	Notes
1	6	24	Pirmin Werner	Switzerland	122.17	—N/a		Q
2	3	7	Qi Guangpu	China	120.80	—N/a		Q
3	5	21	Wang Xindi	China	118.10	—N/a		Q
4	13	23	Lewis Irving	Canada	117.70	—N/a		Q
5	10	3	Connor Curran	United States	117.26	—N/a		Q
6	15	22	Oleksandr Okipniuk	Ukraine	112.67	—N/a		Q
7	2	17	Li Tianma	China	75.56	127.50	127.50	Q
8	1	18	Sun Jiaxu	China	84.51	118.55	118.55	Q
9	16	11	Émile Nadeau	Canada	108.85	112.67	112.67	Q
10	14	16	Derek Krueger	United States	111.95	79.18	111.95	Q
11	12	20	Christopher Lillis	United States	106.20	111.76	111.76	Q
12	7	12	Noé Roth	Switzerland	109.05	111.06	111.06	Q
13	21	13	Roman Ivanov	Kazakhstan	105.75	81.45	105.75	
14	17	9	Victor Primeau	Canada	84.07	103.27	103.27	
15	8	15	Miha Fontaine	Canada	99.56	93.21	99.56	
16	20	25	Sherzod Khashirbayev	Kazakhstan	98.67	92.74	98.67	
17	4	5	Dmytro Kotovskyi	Ukraine	95.16	80.97	95.16	
18	19	14	Assylkhan Assan	Kazakhstan	88.94	93.21	93.21	
19	22	19	Dinmukhammed Raimkulov	Kazakhstan	69.47	90.50	90.50	
20	23	6	Reilly Flanagan	Australia	74.02	87.57	87.57	
21	11	2	Yan Havriuk	Ukraine	84.07	53.84	84.07	
22	24	1	Nicholas Novak	Czech Republic	76.11	61.54	76.11	
23	18	10	Maksym Kuznietsov	Ukraine	68.88	64.60	68.88	
24	25	8	Haruto Igarashi	Japan	67.86	DNS	67.86	
	9	4	Quinn Dehlinger	United States	Did not start			

=== Finals ===
The final was held at 13:00.

Rank	Bib	Name	Country	Final 1			Final 2
Rank	Bib	Name	Country	Jump 1	Jump 2	Best	Final 2
1st place, gold medalist(s)	5	Wang Xindi	China	120.36	101.50	120.36	132.60
2nd place, silver medalist(s)	7	Noé Roth	Switzerland	131.56	67.42	131.56	131.58
3rd place, bronze medalist(s)	2	Li Tianma	China	119.91	100.50	119.91	123.93
4	1	Sun Jiaxu	China	117.26	96.83	117.26	123.42
5	6	Pirmin Werner	Switzerland	127.50	115.93	127.50	99.32
6	3	Qi Guangpu	China	121.68	119.91	121.68	81.00
7	13	Lewis Irving	Canada	102.26	111.00	111.00	—N/a
8	12	Christopher Lillis	United States	86.73	102.71	102.71	—N/a
9	16	Émile Nadeau	Canada	102.21	86.19	102.21	—N/a
10	15	Oleksandr Okipniuk	Ukraine	101.00	92.31	101.00	—N/a
11	14	Derek Krueger	United States	76.99	92.74	92.74	—N/a
12	10	Connor Curran	United States	88.69	86.73	88.69	—N/a
