= Oleksandr Okipniuk =

Ukrainian freestyle skier (born 1998)

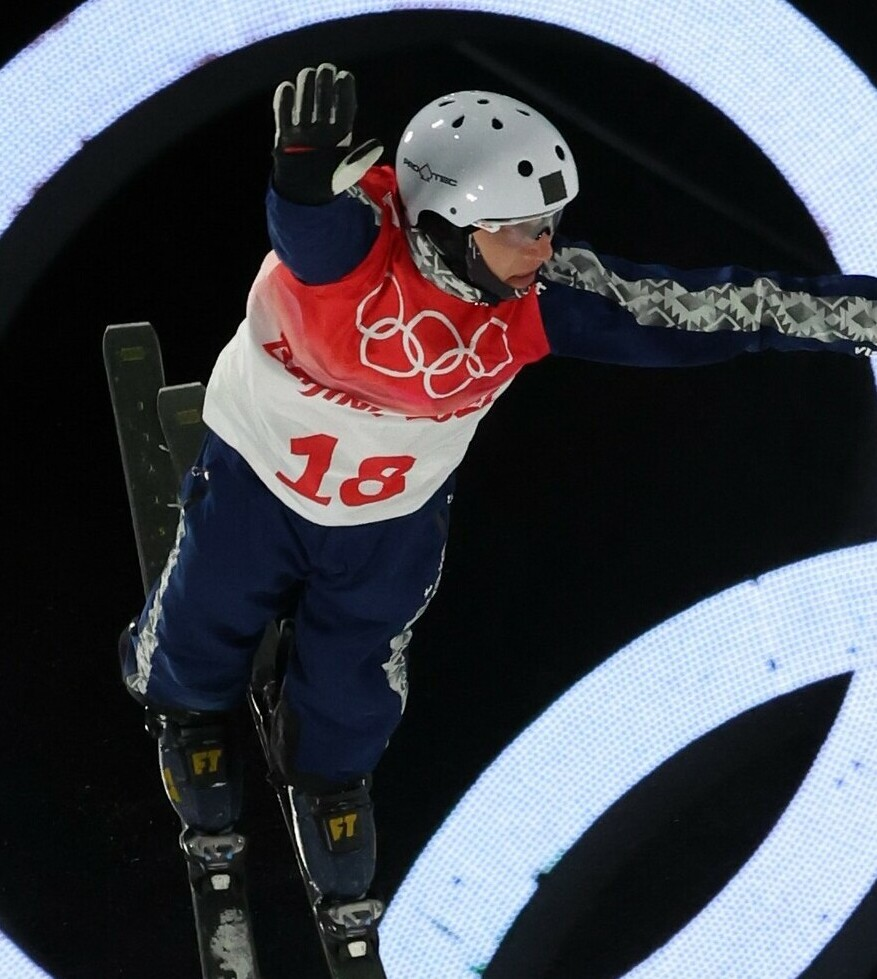

Personal information
- Full name: Окіпнюк Олександр Олександрович
- Born: 4 September 1998 (age 27) Berehove, Zakarpattia Oblast, Ukraine

Sport
- Sport: Skiing

World Cup career
- Indiv. podiums: 1
- Indiv. wins: 1
Medal record
Men's freestyle skiing
Representing Ukraine
World Championships
Silver medal – second place	2025 Engadin	Mixed team aerials
Bronze medal – third place	2023 Bakuriani	Mixed team aerials
- Updated on 4 January 2026

Oleksandr Oleksandrovych Okipniuk (Ukrainian: Окіпнюк Олександр Олександрович; born 4 September 1998) is a Ukrainian freestyle skier, specializing in aerials. He competed at the 2022 and 2026 Winter Olympics.

== Career ==
Okipniuk took up freestyle skiing in his hometown Berehove, and his mother was his first trainer.

Okipniuk's debut at international competitions occurred on February 11, 2012, at the European Cup stage in Bukovel, Ukraine, where he was 19th. Aged just 14, he made his World Cup debut one year later, on February 23, 2013, also in Bukovel. He placed 27th. Between 2013, after his World Cup debut, and 2018, he participated at the World Cup competitions only one more time, predominantly taking part in European Cup events. One of the reasons was the back injury he suffered in 2015. He went to Kisvárda, Hungary, to undergo medical treatment. He resumed his training at the end of 2016. Okipniuk competed at five Junior World Championships. He achieved his best result in 2018, finishing 12th in Minsk, Belarus.

He has been a permanent member of the Ukrainian national team since the 2018–19 season. As of December 2025, he has clinched one World Cup victory.

Okipniuk's World Championships debut was at the 2021 Championships in Almaty, Kazakhstan. He was then 12th in the individual competition. At the next two World Championships, he won a bronze and a silver respectively in the mixed team event.

In 2022, Oleksandr Okipniuk was nominated for his first Winter Games in Beijing. He finished 9th. Ukraine had qualified for the mixed team event but was not allowed by the Chinese authorities to compete due to positive COVID-19 tests by Kotovskyi, Okipniuk, and Novosad.

== Personal life ==
Okipniuk is student of the sports faculty at the Kamyanets-Podilsky Ivan Ohienko National University.

== Career results ==
=== Winter Olympics ===
Year	Place	Aerials	Team event
2022	Beijing, China	9	—
2026	(Italy) Milano Cortina	10	6

=== World Championships ===
Year	Place	Aerials	Team event
2021	Shymbulak, Kazakhstan	12	—
2023	(Georgia (country)) Bakuriani, Georgia	9	3
2025	Engadin, Switzerland	5	2

=== World Cup ===
==== Individual podiums ====
Season	Place	Rank
2025–26	Ruka, Finland	1

==== Individual rankings ====
Season	Aerials	Overall
2012–13	46	301
2013–14	missed	
2014–15	35	179
2015–16	missed	
2016–17	missed	
2017–18	missed	
2018–19	40	216
2019–20	36	215
2020–21	24	—N/a
2021–22	19	—N/a
2022–23	21	—N/a
2023–24	38	—N/a
2024–25	23	—N/a
2025–26	18	—N/a

=== European Cup ===
==== Individual podiums ====
Season	Place	Rank
2019–20	Bukovel, Ukraine	1
2019–20	Bukovel, Ukraine	2
2022–23	Ruka, Finland	1
