= Dmytro Kotovskyi =

Ukrainian freestyle skier (born 2001)

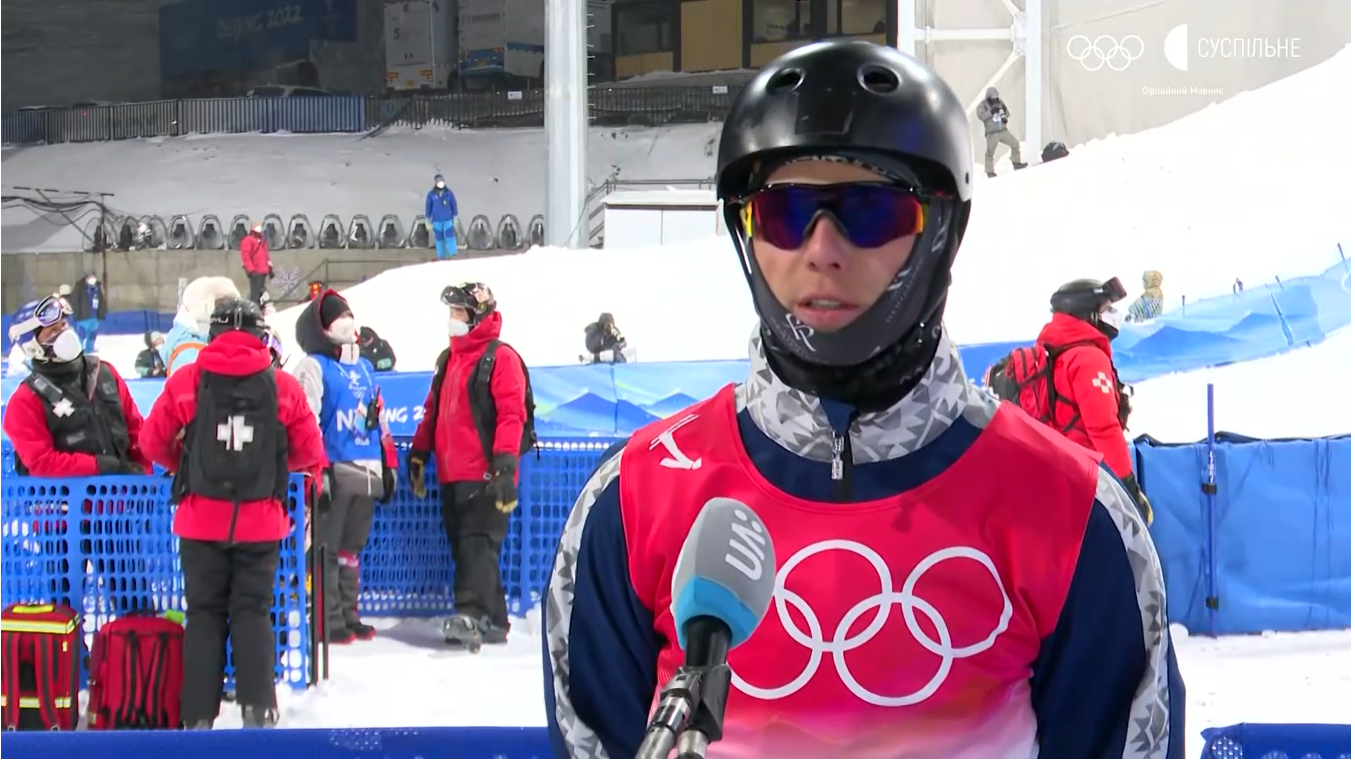

Personal information
- Full name: Дмитро Володимирович Котовський
- Born: 8 November 2001 (age 24) Rivne, Ukraine

Sport
- Sport: Skiing

World Cup career
- Indiv. podiums: 7
- Indiv. wins: 3
Medal record
Men's freestyle skiing
Representing Ukraine
World Championships
Silver medal – second place	2025 Engadin	Mixed team aerials
Bronze medal – third place	2023 Bakuriani	Mixed team aerials
- Updated on 4 February 2026

Dmytro Volodymyrovych Kotovskyi (Ukrainian: Дмитро Володимирович Котовський; born 8 November 2001) is a Ukrainian freestyle skier, specializing in aerials. He competed at both the 2022 and 2026 Winter Olympics.

== Career ==
Kotovskyi's debut in international competitions occurred on December 1, 2017, at the European Cup stage in Ruka, Finland, where he was 32nd. He made his World Cup debut on February 23, 2019, in Minsk, Belarus. He placed 24th. As of January 2022, his best World Cup finish was 4th on January 12, 2022, in Deer Valley, United States.

Kotovskyi competed at two Junior World Championships. In 2018, he finished 20th, while in 2019 he narrowly missed the podium by finishing 4th.

His World Championships debut was at the 2021 Championships in Almaty, Kazakhstan. He was then 6th in the individual competition, finishing best among Ukrainians and 5th in the mixed team event. At the following two championships, he managed to win medals in the mixed team events.

In 2022, Dmytro Kotovskyi was nominated for his first Winter Games in Beijing. He finished 15th in men's competition. He was unable to compete in the mixed team event due to positive COVID-19 tests. He was 15th in the individual event.

Kotovskyi's first World Cup podium came on 21 January 2023 when he finished 3rd in Le Relais, Canada. The next day, he improved this result and clinched silver. He later won two competitions in Deer Valley and Engadin and was the leader of the World Cup standings before the last competition. But in Almaty he finished just 13th, which allowed Noé Roth to win the small 2022–23 Crystal Globe in aerials, while Kotovskyi finished second.

== Personal life ==
Kotoskyi is student of the National University of Ukraine on Physical Education and Sport.

== Career results ==
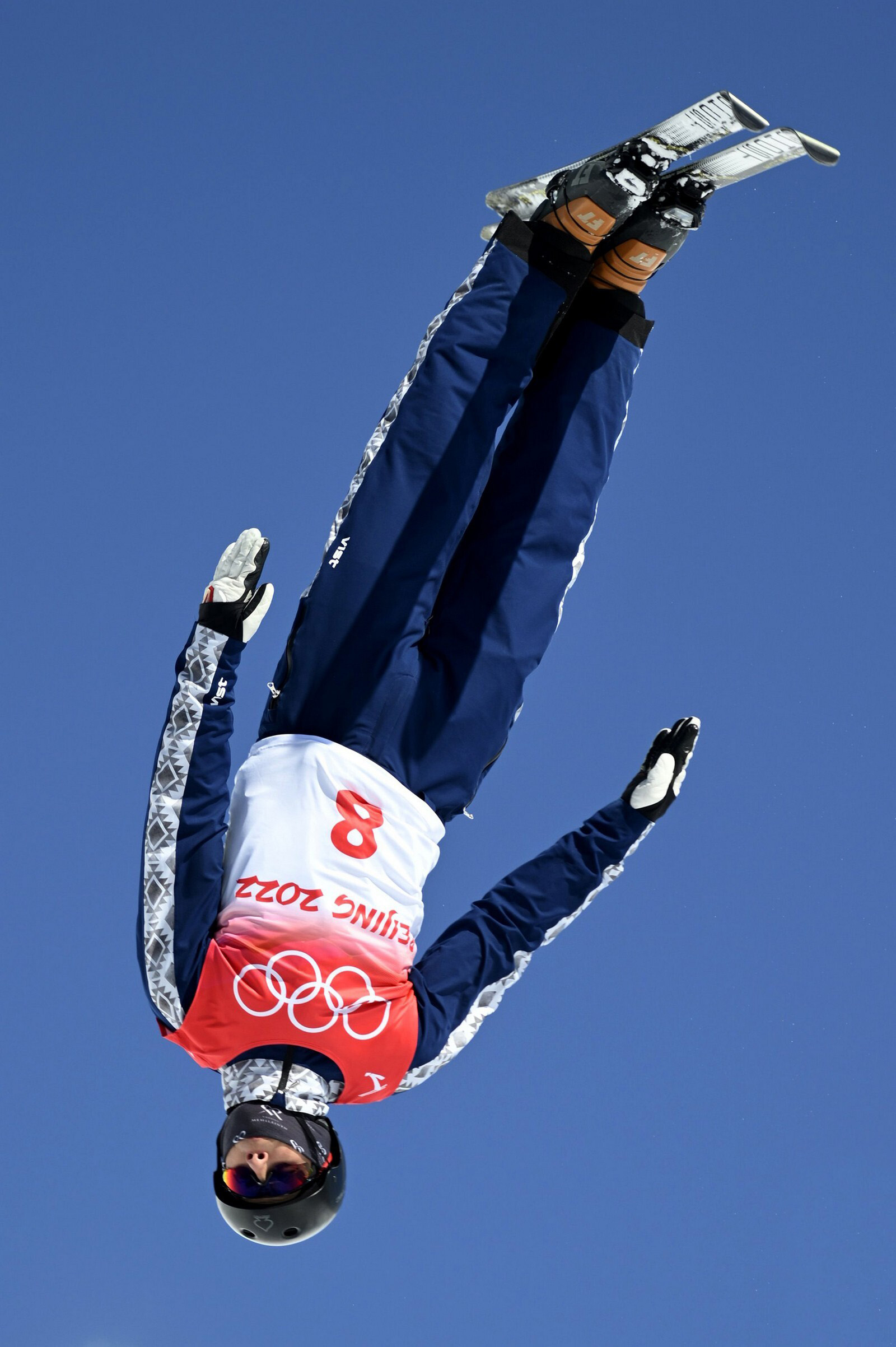
Kotovskyi competing at the 2022 Winter Olympics.

=== Winter Olympics ===
Year	Place	Aerials	Team event
2022	Beijing, China	15	—
2026	(Italy) Milano Cortina	17	6

=== World Championships ===
Year	Place	Aerials	Team event
2021	Shymbulak, Kazakhstan	6	5
2023	(Georgia (country)) Bakuriani, Georgia	15	3
2025	Engadin, Switzerland	17	2

=== World Cup ===
==== Individual podiums ====
Season	Place	Rank
2022–23	Le Relais, Canada	3
2022–23	Le Relais, Canada	2
2022–23	Deer Valley, United States	1
2022–23	Engadin, Switzerland	1
2023–24	Ruka, Finland	3
2024–25	Deer Valley, United States	2
2025–26	Lac-Beauport, Canada	1

==== Team podiums ====
Season	Place	Rank
2021–22	Ruka, Finland	3
2021–22	Ruka, Finland	3

==== Individual rankings ====
Season	Aerials	Overall
2018–19	43	237
2019–20	44	246
2020–21	22	—N/a
2021–22	9	—N/a
2022–23	2	—N/a
2023–24	12	—N/a
2024–25	9	—N/a
2025–26	4	—N/a

=== European Cup ===
==== Individual podiums ====
Season	Place	Rank
2019–20	Bukovel, Ukraine	1
2020–21	Ruka, Finland	3
2021–22	Chiesa in Valmalenco, Italy	1
2022–23	Ruka, Finland	2
2023–24	Ruka, Finland	1
2023–24	Airolo, Switzerland	3
2023–24	Airolo, Switzerland	2
