= Abramenko =

Abramenko is a Ukrainian-language surname derived from the first name Abram (Abraham).

The surname may refer to:

- Evgeny Abramenko (born 1987), Belarusian biathlete
- Oleksandr Abramenko (born 1988), Ukrainian freestyle skier

== See also ==
- 9532 Abramenko, an asteroid
