= Alex Bowen =

Alex Bowen may refer to:

- Alex Bowen (skier) (born 1991), American freestyle skier
- Alex Bowen (TV personality) (born c. 1991), British reality television contestant
- Alex Bowen (water polo) (born 1993), American water polo player

== See also ==
- Alexander Bowen (born 1990), Panamanian high jumper
