= Oleksandr Abramenko =

Ukrainian freestyle skier

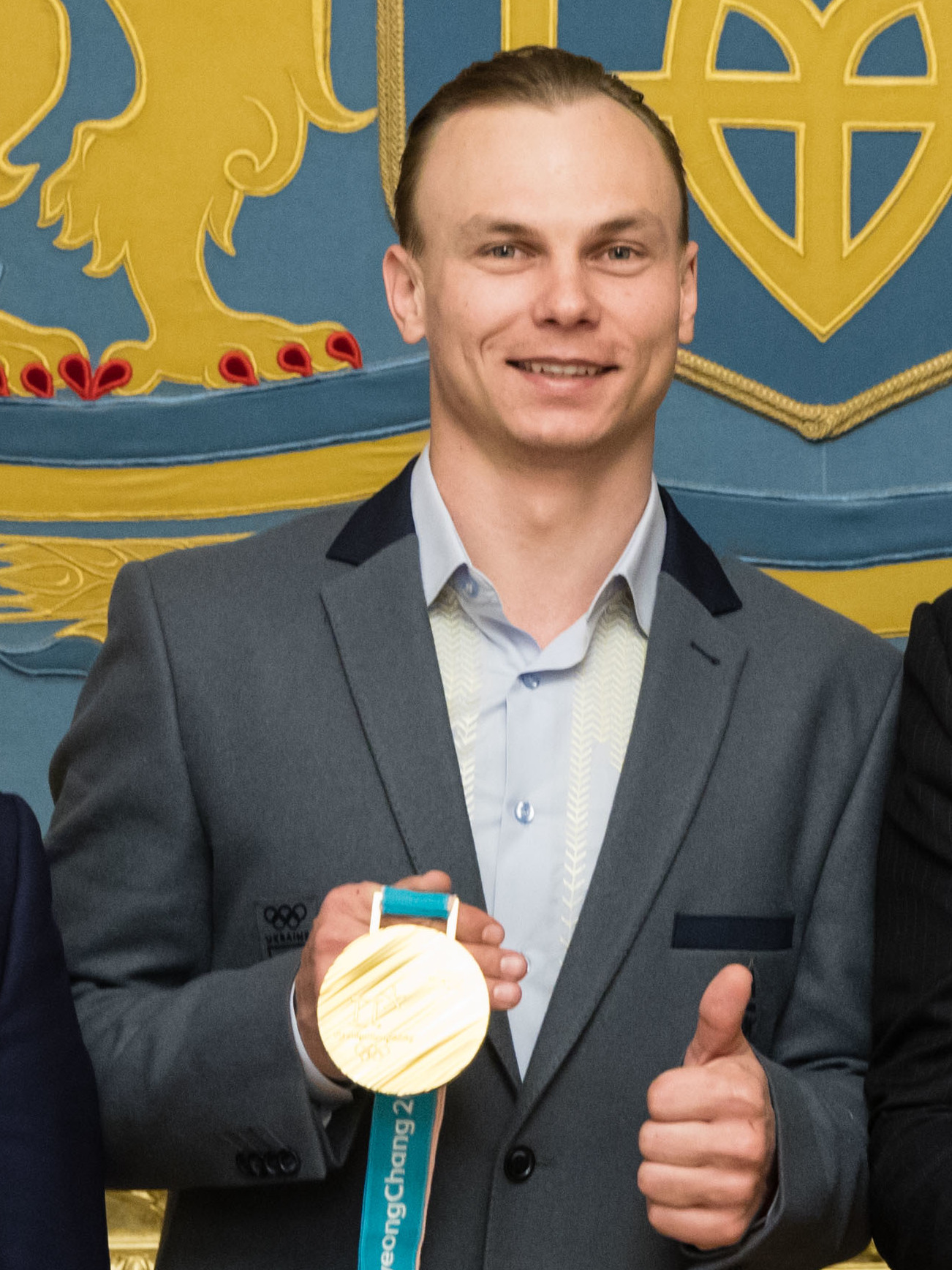

Personal information
- Full name: Олександр Володимирович Абраменко
- Born: 4 May 1988 (age 38) Pervomaiskyi, Kharkiv Oblast
- Height: 1.80 m (5 ft 11 in)

Sport
- Sport: Skiing

World Cup career
- Indiv. podiums: 8
- Indiv. wins: 1
- Discipline titles: 1 – Aerials (2015–16)
Medal record
Men's freestyle skiing
Representing Ukraine
Olympic Games
Gold medal – first place	2018 Pyeongchang	Aerials
Silver medal – second place	2022 Beijing	Aerials
World Championships
Silver medal – second place	2019 Utah	Aerials
Junior World Championships
Silver medal – second place	2006 Krasnoe Ozero	Aerials
- Updated on 3 January 2026

Oleksandr Volodymyrovych Abramenko (Ukrainian: Олександр Володимирович Абраменко; born 4 May 1988) is a Ukrainian Olympic gold medalist freestyle skier, specializing in aerials. He is the 2015–16 Aerials World Cup winner. He competed at the 2006, 2010, 2014, 2018, and 2022 Winter Olympics, winning the Olympic gold medal in the men's aerials event at Pyeongchang. Abramenko is also 2019 World Championships and 2022 Winter Olympics silver medalist.

== Career ==
Abramenko competed at the 2005 World Championships in Ruka, Finland, where he was 25th. Abramenko made his World Cup debut on 8 January 2006 in Mont Gabriel, Canada. He placed eighteenth. Even though he was quite young and inexperienced, he competed at the 2006 Winter Olympics in Turin, Italy. In aerials, he did not advance, placing 27th in the qualifying round. On 6 March 2006, he won a silver medal at the 2006 World Junior Championships in Krasnoe Ozero, Russia. On 19 January 2008, Abramenko finished tenth at the World Cup event in Lake Placid, United States. He was among the best in four of seven competitions that season.

Abramenko competed at the 2010 Winter Olympics in Vancouver, Canada, for Ukraine. In aerials, he placed 24th in the event's qualifying round, again failing to advance to the final.

His first World Cup podium came on 25 February 2012, in Minsk, Belarus, when he was second after another Ukrainian Stanislav Kravchuk. That year he also was 3rd in Voss, Norway.

At the 2014 Winter Olympics, he reached the final and placed 6th.

He celebrated his first victory on 1 March 2015 in Minsk, Belarus. In 2015–16 season, he became the first-ever Ukrainian to win World Cup in aerials or any other freestyle discipline. That season was the most successful for him because Abramenko's results were 5th, 3rd, 3rd, 2nd, 13th, and 5th.

In the summer of 2016, Abramenko suffered a severe injury. While practicing on water, he injured his cruciate ligaments and his meniscus and transverse ligament. His knee injury didn't allow him to compete whole next season. He also missed 2017 World Championships.

He returned in the pre-Olympic 2017–18 season. There were concerns that Ukraine, for the first time ever, would not qualify any sportsman for men's freestyle skiing due to crisis in Ukrainian freestyle skiing. Abramenko started that season not confidently, finishing 21st in Beijing. But later, his performances improved, and on 19 January 2018, he achieved his eighth podium in Lake Placid, United States. He was then second after China's Jia Zongyang. These results assured him a spot in 2018 Winter Olympics in Pyeongchang, South Korea. At the 2018 Winter Olympics he surprisingly became the winner. Abramenko became the second native of Ukraine to win Olympic gold in freestyle after Anton Kushnir, who in 2014 represented Belarus.

On 6 February 2019, he won the silver medal at the World Championships in Utah, United States. It was Ukraine's first World Championships medal in men's aerials.

In 2022, Oleksandr Abramenko competed in his fifth Winter Games in Beijing. He won a silver in the Aerials with a score of 116.5.

On 24 October 2024, Abramenko announced retirement from competitive sports. In his last competition on 4 December 2022 in Ruka during the World Cup, he finished 10th. Later he started a coaching career.

== Personal life ==
Abramenko's father is Volodymyr Abramenko, a former footballer who played for a few amateur teams in Ukraine and is currently a security officer at MFC Mykolaiv.

Largely unknown to the public until he earned his 2018 Olympic gold medal, Abramenko's place of birth was a source of confusion to his fans as many populated places in Ukraine carry names similar to Pervomaiskyi.

On March 4, 2022, The New York Times reported that Abramenko was planning to leave Kyiv to stay with his coach Enver Ablaev who lives in Mukachevo, Transcarpathian region.

== Career results ==
=== Winter Olympics ===
Year	Place	Aerials	Team event
2006	Turin, Italy	27	—N/a
2010	Vancouver, Canada	24	—N/a
2014	Sochi, Russia	6	—N/a
2018	Pyeongchang, South Korea	1	—N/a
2022	Beijing, China	2	—

=== World Championships ===
Year	Place	Aerials	Team event
2005	Ruka, Finland	25	—N/a
2007	Madonna di Campiglio, Italy	16	—N/a
2009	Inawashiro, Japan	5	—N/a
2011	Deer Valley, United States	7	—N/a
2013	Voss, Norway	6	—N/a
2015	Kreischberg, Austria	10	—N/a
2019	Utah, United States	2	—
2021	Shymbulak, Kazakhstan	10	5

=== World Cup ===
==== Individual podiums ====
Season	Place	Rank
2011–12	Minsk, Belarus	2
2011–12	Voss, Norway	3
2014–15	Deer Valley, United States	3
2014–15	Minsk, Belarus	1
2015–16	Beijing, China	3
2015–16	Deer Valley, United States	3
2015–16	Deer Valley, United States	2
2017–18	Lake Placid, United States	2

==== Team podiums ====
Season	Place	Rank
2021–22	Ruka, Finland	3
2021–22	Ruka, Finland	3

==== Individual rankings ====
Season	Aerials	Overall
2005–06	48	177
2006–07	25	74
2007–08	15	48
2008–09	9	28
2009–10	30	84
2010–11	8	20
2011–12	7	20
2012–13	11	38
2013–14	12	43
2014–15	6	21
2015–16	1	5
2016–17	missed	
2017–18	6	31
2018–19	16	85
2019–20	missed	
2020–21	13	—
2021–22	14	—
2022–23	34	—

=== European Cup ===
==== Individual podiums ====
Season	Place	Rank
2009–10	Bukovel, Ukraine	2
2010–11	Bukovel, Ukraine	1
2010–11	Bukovel, Ukraine	1
2013–14	Ruka, Finland	1
2014–15	Ruka, Finland	2
2015–16	Ruka, Finland	2
2017–18	Ruka, Finland	1
2017–18	Ruka, Finland	1
2020–21	Airolo, Switzerland	2
