= Maxim Burov =

Russian freestyle skier

Personal information
- Full name: Maxim Alekseyevich Burov
- Nationality: Russia
- Born: 5 June 1998 (age 28) Yaroslavl, Russia
- Height: 1.70 m (5 ft 7 in)

Sport
- Sport: Skiing
- Club: Sports school No. 3, Yaroslavl; Olympic Sports Center, Moscow Oblast

World Cup career
- Indiv. podiums: 13
- Indiv. wins: 10
- Team podiums: 4
- Team wins: 3
- Discipline titles: 3
Medal record
Men's freestyle skiing
Representing Russian Ski Federation
World Championships
Gold medal – first place	2021 Almaty	Aerials
Gold medal – first place	2021 Almaty	Mixed team aerials
Representing Russia
World Championships
Gold medal – first place	2019 Utah	Aerials
Bronze medal – third place	2019 Utah	Mixed team aerials
Winter Universiade
Gold medal – first place	2019 Krasnoyarsk	Aerials
Bronze medal – third place	2019 Krasnoyarsk	Mixed team aerials
Junior World Championships
Gold medal – first place	2014 Chiesa in Valmalenco	Аerials
Gold medal – first place	2016 Minsk	Аerials
Silver medal – second place	2015 Chiesa in Valmalenco	Аerials

Maxim Alekseyevich Burov (Russian: Максим Алексеевич Буров; born 5 June 1998) is a Russian freestyle skier. A three-time World Champion, he won back-to-back titles in individual aerials, in 2019 and 2021, becoming the first Russian and the fourth male aerial skier to do that. He participated at two Winter Olympics and competed in the men's aerials by representing Olympic Athletes from Russia in 2018 and Russian Olympic Committee in 2022.

His elder brother, Ilya Burov, is a fellow freestyle aerials skier and has competed at the 2014 Winter Olympics, 2018 Winter Olympics and in the 2022 Winter Olympics. The brothers competed at the men's aerials freestyle skiing event in the 2018 Winter Olympics, with Ilya winning a bronze medal in the event while Maxim Burov finished in 15th position. Four years later they competed at the same event in the 2022 Winter Olympics, with Ilya winning a bronze medal again while Maxim finished in 16th position.

== World Cup podiums ==
=== Individual podiums ===
- 14 wins
- 17 podiums

Season	Date	Location	Place
2016–17	14 January 2017	Lake Placid, United States	3rd
2016–17	4 March 2017	Moscow, Russia	3rd
2017–18	12 January 2018	Deer Valley, United States	1st
2017–18	20 January 2018	Lake Placid, United States	1st
2018–19	19 January 2019	Lake Placid, United States	1st
2018–19	23 February 2019	Minsk, Belarus	1st
2019–20	22 December 2019	Shimao Lotus Mountain, China	2nd
2019–20	23 February 2019	Deer Valley, United States	1st
2020–21	4 December 2020	Ruka, Finland	1st
2020–21	16 January 2021	Yaroslavl, Russia	1st
2020–21	17 January 2021	Yaroslavl, Russia	1st
2020–21	23 January 2021	Moscow, Russia	1st
2020–21	30 January 2021	Minsk, Belarus	1st
2021–22	2 December 2020	Ruka, Finland	1st
2021–22	3 December 2021	Ruka, Finland	1st
2021–22	10 December 2021	Ruka, Finland	1st
2021–22	11 December 2021	Ruka, Finland	1st

=== Team podiums ===
- 3 wins
- 5 podiums

Season	Date	Location	Place	Teammate(s)
2016–17	18 December 2016	Beida Lake, China	1st	Alexandra Orlova; Liubov Nikitina
2017–18	17 December 2017	Beijing/Secret Garden, China	3rd	Liubov Nikitina; Ilya Burov
2019–20	22 December 2019	Shimao Lotus Mountain, China	1st	Liubov Nikitina; Pavel Krotov
2020–21	17 January 2021	Yaroslavl, Russia	1st	Anastasia Prytkova; Pavel Krotov
2021–22	3 December 2021	Ruka, Finland	2nd	Liubov Nikitina; Stanislav Nikitin

=== Season titles ===
- 3 titles

Season	Discipline
2018	Aerials
2021	Aerials
2022	Aerials
