= Liubov Nikitina =

Russian freestyle skier

Lyubov Nikitina
Personal information
- Full name: Lyubov Igorevna Nikitina
- Nationality: Russia
- Born: 21 January 1999 (age 27) Yaroslavl, Russia
- Height: 1.64 m (5 ft 5 in)

Sport
- Sport: Skiing

World Cup career
- Indiv. podiums: 2
- Indiv. wins: 0
Medal record
Women's freestyle skiing
Representing Russian Ski Federation
World Championships
Gold medal – first place	2021 Almaty	Mixed team aerials
Bronze medal – third place	2021 Almaty	Aerials
Representing Russia
World Championships
Silver medal – second place	2019 Utah	Aerials
Bronze medal – third place	2019 Utah	Mixed team aerials
Winter Universiade
Silver medal – second place	2019 Krasnoyarsk	Aerials
Bronze medal – third place	2019 Krasnoyarsk	Mixed team aerials
Junior World Championships
Gold medal – first place	2017 Chiesa in Valmalenco	Аerials
Gold medal – first place	2018 Minsk	Аerials
Bronze medal – third place	2014 Chiesa in Valmalenco	Аerials
Bronze medal – third place	2016 Minsk	Аerials

Lyubov Igorevna Nikitina (Russian: Любовь Игоревна Никитина; born 21 January 1999) is a Russian freestyle skier who competes internationally.

She participated at the 2018 Winter Olympics and the FIS Freestyle Ski and Snowboarding World Championships 2019, winning a medal.

Her brother Stanislav Nikitin is also a freestyle skier.

== World Cup podiums ==
=== Individual podiums ===
- 0 wins
- 3 podiums

Season	Date	Location	Place
2016–17	17 December 2017	Beida Lake, China	3rd
2020–21	16 January 2021	Yaroslavl, Russia	3rd
2020–21	3 March 2021	Almaty, Kazakhstan	2nd

=== Team podiums ===
- 2 wins
- 3 podiums

Season	Date	Location	Place	Teammate(s)
2016–17	18 December 2016	Beida Lake, China	1st	Alexandra Orlova; Maxim Burov
2017–18	17 December 2017	Beijing/Secret Garden, China	3rd	Maxim Burov; Ilya Burov
2019–20	22 December 2019	Shimao Lotus Mountain, China	1st	Maxim Burov; Pavel Krotov
