= Christian Haechler =

Swiss freestyle skier

Personal information
- Born: November 8, 1983 (age 42) Zurich, Switzerland

Sport
- Sport: Skiing
- Updated on March 28, 2013

Christian Haechler (born November 8, 1983, in Zurich) is a Swiss freestyle skier, specializing in aerials.

Haechler competed at the 2010 Winter Olympics for Switzerland. He placed 16th in the qualifying round of the aerials event, failing to advance to the final.

As of March 2013, his best showing at the World Championships is 8th, in the 2011.

Haechler made his World Cup debut in March 2005. As of March 2013, his best World Cup event finish is 4th, in 2009/10. His best World Cup overall finish in aerials is 9th, in 2010/11.
