= Derek Krueger =

American freestyle skier (born 2003)

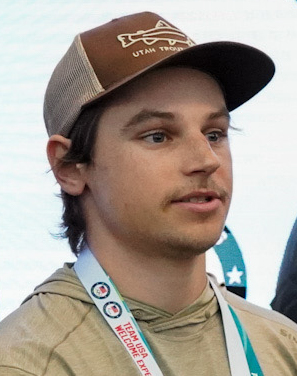

Personal information
- Born: June 2, 2003 (age 22) Chagrin Falls, Ohio, U.S.

Sport
- Country: United States
- Sport: Freestyle skiing
- Event: Aerials

Derek Krueger (born June 2, 2003) is an American freestyle skier specializing in aerials. He represented the United States at the 2026 Winter Olympics.

== Career ==
During the final stop of the 2025–26 FIS Freestyle Ski World Cup on January 11, 2026, he earned a career-best fourth-place finish. He was subsequently selected to represent the United States at the 2026 Winter Olympics.
