= FIS Freestyle Ski and Snowboarding World Championships 2021 – Mixed team aerials =

Mixed team aerials at the FIS Freestyle Ski and Snowboarding World Championships 2021
- Venue: Shymbulak
- Location: Almaty, Kazakhstan
- Date: 11 March
- Competitors: 21 from 7 nations
- Teams: 7
- Winning points: 300.94

Medalists
gold medal	Liubov Nikitina; Pavel Krotov; Maxim Burov
silver medal	Carol Bouvard; Pirmin Werner; Noé Roth	Switzerland
bronze medal	Ashley Caldwell; Eric Loughran; Christopher Lillis	United States

The Mixed team aerials competition at the FIS Freestyle Ski and Snowboarding World Championships 2021 was held on 11 March 2021.

== Results ==
The final was started at 15:00.

Rank	Bib	Country	Final 1	Final 2
1st place, gold medalist(s)	1; 1–1; 1–2; 1–3	Russian Ski Federation; Liubov Nikitina; Pavel Krotov; Maxim Burov	328.29; 88.47; 118.14; 121.68	300.94; 91.65; 93.36; 115.93
2nd place, silver medalist(s)	3; 3–1; 3–2; 3–3	Switzerland; Carol Bouvard; Pirmin Werner; Noé Roth	291.36; 70.56; 116.82; 103.98	293.46; 66.46; 108.41; 118.59
3rd place, bronze medalist(s)	2; 2–1; 2–2; 2–3	United States; Ashley Caldwell; Eric Loughran; Christopher Lillis	314.67; 80.15; 114.16; 120.36	283.97; 103.03; 88.94; 92.00
4	4; 4–1; 4–2; 4–3	Belarus; Hanna Huskova; Makar Mitrafanau; Pavel Dzik	265.67; 85.05; 78.16; 102.46	247.74; 82.21; 90.31; 75.22
5	7; 7–1; 7–2; 7–3	Ukraine; Anastasiya Novosad; Dmytro Kotovskyi; Oleksandr Abramenko	252.27; 82.84; 78.28; 91.15	—
6	5; 5–1; 5–2; 5–3	Canada; Marion Thénault; Miha Fontaine; Lewis Irving	240.28; 87.06; 101.79; 51.43	—
7	6; 6–1; 6–2; 6–3	Kazakhstan; Akmarzhan Kalmurzayeva; Zhanbota Aldabergenova; Sherzod Khashyrbayev	211.62; 61.39; 76.12; 74.11	—
