= Ilya Burov =

Russian freestyle skier

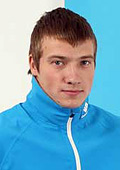

Personal information
- Full name: Ilya Alekseyevich Burov
- Nationality: Russia
- Born: 13 November 1991 (age 34) Yaroslavl, Russian SSR, Soviet Union (now Russia)

Sport
- Sport: Skiing

World Cup career
- Indiv. podiums: 8
- Indiv. wins: 0
Medal record
Men's freestyle skiing
Representing ROC
| Bronze medal – third place | 2022 Beijing | Aerials |
Representing Olympic Athletes from Russia
Olympic Games
| Bronze medal – third place | 2018 Pyeongchang | Aerials |

Ilya Alekseyevich Burov (Russian: Илья Алексеевич Буров; born 13 November 1991), also spelled Ilia Burov, is a Russian freestyle skier, specializing in aerials.

== Career ==
Burov competed at the 2014 Winter Olympics for Russia. He placed 10th in the first qualifying round in the aerials, failing to advance. He subsequently placed 10th in the second qualification round, again failing to advance. Burov completed at the 2018 Winter Olympics representing Olympic Athletes from Russia. He placed 8th in the first qualifying round in the aerials, failing to advance. He subsequently placed 1st in the second qualification round and advanced to finals. The next day he placed 6th in both final round 1 and Round 2 and placed 3rd in the final round 3, winning the bronze medal.

As of February 2018, his best showing at the World Championships is 5th, in the 2015 aerials.

Burov made his World Cup debut in January 2011. As of February 2018, his best World Cup finish is 2nd, at a World Cup stage held in Moscow in 2015 and 2018. His best World Cup overall finish in aerials is 4th in 2014–15.

He competed in the 2022 Beijing Winter Olympics and won his second bronze in aerials with a score of 114.93.

== Personal life ==
Ilya's younger brother, Maxim Burov (born 1998), is also a Russian freestyle skier and Olympian. Maxim Burov is a three-time World Champion and three-time World Cup holder.

== World Cup podiums ==
=== Individual podiums ===
- 0 wins
- 8 podiums

| Season | Date | Location | Place |
|---|---|---|---|
| 2014–15 | 20 December 2014 | Beijing, China | 3rd |
| 2014–15 | 31 January 2015 | Lake Placid, United States | 3rd |
| 2014–15 | 21 February 2015 | Moscow, Russia | 2nd |
| 2015–16 | 13 February 2016 | Moscow, Russia | 3rd |
| 2015–16 | 20 February 2016 | Minsk, Belarus | 3rd |
| 2017–18 | 6 January 2018 | Moscow, Russia | 2nd |
| 2019–20 | 7 February 2020 | Deer Valley, United States | 3rd |
| 2020–21 | 4 December 2020 | Ruka, Finland | 3rd |

=== Team podiums ===
- 0 wins
- 3 podiums

| Season | Date | Location | Place | Teammate(s) |
|---|---|---|---|---|
| 2014–15 | 21 February 2014 | Beijing, China | 2nd | Veronika Korsunova; Pavel Krotov |
| 2014–15 | 31 January 2015 | Lake Placid, United States | 3rd | Veronika Korsunova; Pavel Krotov |
| 2017–18 | 21 February 2014 | Beijing/Secret Garden, China | 3rd | Liubov Nikitina; Maxim Burov |
