= Christopher Lillis =

American freestyle skier (born 1998)

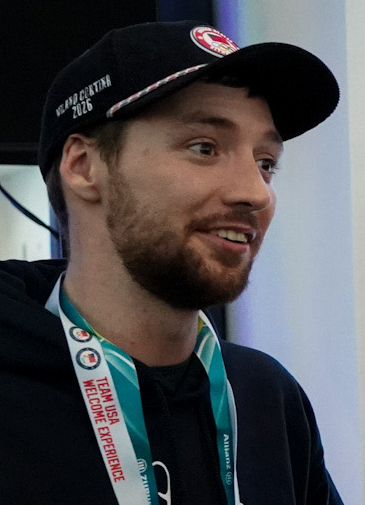
- Lillis in 2026

Personal information
- Born: October 4, 1998 (age 27) Rochester, New York, U.S.
- Height: 5 ft 9 in (175 cm)
- Weight: 135 lb (61 kg)

Sport
- Country: United States
- Sport: Freestyle skiing
- Event: Aerials
Medal record
Men's freestyle skiing
Representing the United States
Olympic Games
Gold medal – first place	2022 Beijing	Mixed team aerials
Gold medal – first place	2026 Milano Cortina	Mixed team aerials
World Championships
Gold medal – first place	2025 Engadin	Mixed team aerials
Gold medal – first place	2023 Bakuriani	Mixed team aerials
Silver medal – second place	2021 Almaty	Aerials
Bronze medal – third place	2021 Almaty	Mixed team aerials

Christopher B. Lillis (born October 4, 1998) is an American freestyle skier. He is a two-time Olympic gold medalist, winning the mixed team aerials event at both the 2022 Winter Olympics and 2026 Winter Olympics.

== Early life ==
Lillis was born on October 4, 1998, in Rochester, New York, United States. His hometown is the suburb of Pittsford, New York. According to his member profile with U.S. Ski & Snowboard, Chris Lillis began skiing at Bristol Mountain when he was three years old, and joined the Bristol Mountain Freestyle Team at six years old. He is 5 ft 9 in tall and weighs 135 lb. His older brother Jonathon Lillis competed at the 2018 Winter Olympics. His younger brother Michael, an up-and-coming aerial skier, tragically died in 2017. Just one week after Mikey's funeral, Chris and his older brother Jon returned to competition in Finland, determined to honor their brother's memory by continuing to pursue their Olympic dreams.

== Career ==
He is the youngest man ever to win a FIS Aerials World Cup race, at 17 years old. He came in first at the 2016 cup in Minsk, Belarus. He also came in first at Almaty, Kazakhstan, in 2020. He competed in aerial skiing at the FIS Freestyle Ski World Championships 2021 in Almaty, winning the silver medal in men's aerials.

Lillis competed in the men's aerials and mixed team aerials events at the 2022 Winter Olympics in Beijing, placing sixth in the men's aerials event and winning a gold medal, alongside Ashley Caldwell and Justin Schoenefeld, in mixed team aerials. In January 2026, Lillis was named to the U.S. Olympic team for the 2026 Winter Olympics in Cortina, Italy, competing in aerials alongside teammates from his Bristol Mountain training program. During the Games, Lillis received a mix of reactions, including social media backlash, for remarks he made tied to his "mixed emotions" about representing Team USA during the political climate of the second Trump administration, including Immigration and Customs Enforcement activity. Although none of his gold-medal winning teammates returned for 2026, Lillis repeated as gold medalist in the mixed team aerials after finishing 8th in the men's aerials.

Lillis attended Monroe Community College and the University of Utah. He is also a guitarist and pianist on the side, both in New York and in Park City, Utah.
