= Veronika Korsunova =

Russian freestyle skier

Personal information
- Born: April 20, 1992 (age 34)

Sport
- Country: Russia
- Sport: Freestyle skiing
Medal record
Women's freestyle skiing
Representing Russia
FIS Freestyle World Ski Championships
Silver medal – second place	2013 Voss	Aerials

Veronika Aleksandrovna Korsunova (Russian: Вероника Александровна Корсунова; born April 20, 1992) is a Russian freestyle skier specializing in aerials. She won a silver medal at the 2013 FIS Freestyle World Ski Championships.
