= Dimitri Isler =

Swiss freestyle skier

Personal information
- Nationality: Swiss
- Born: May 14, 1993 (age 33) Locarno, Switzerland
- Height: 1.75 m (5 ft 9 in)
- Weight: 73 kg (161 lb)

Sport
- Country: Switzerland
- Sport: freestyle skiing

Dimitri Isler (born 14 May 1993) is a Swiss male freestyle skier. He competed at the 2018 Winter Olympics and took part in the men's aerials event finishing on 12th position.

Isler also competed in the Freestyle-Skiing-Weltmeisterschaften 2019 in Deer Valley, USA. Dimitri Isler competed in the final and ranked 11th. At the FIS Freestyle World Championship 2017 Sierra Nevada, Spain and FIS Freestyle World Championship 2015 in Kreischberg, Austria he missed the final by one place and ranked 13th.

Dimitri Isler won the FIS AERIALS European Cup overall in Aerials Skiing back to back in 2012/2013 and 2013/2014. Isler retired in 2019.
