= Naoya Tabara =

Japanese sportsman (born 1980)

- 田原 直哉
- Born: 24 December 1980 (age 45) Wakayama, Wakayama, Japan
- Height: 1.65 m (5 ft 5 in)

Gymnastics career
- Discipline: Men's artistic gymnastics
- Country represented: Japan
Medal record
Men's artistic gymnastics
Representing Japan
Summer Universiade
| Bronze medal – third place | Daegu 2003 | Team |
East Asian Games
| Silver medal – second place | Macau 2005 | Team |

Naoya Tabara (田原 直哉, Tabara Naoya; born 24 December 1980) is a Japanese male artistic gymnast and freestyle skier. He has formerly competed as a gymnast and has participated at the gymnastic competitions until 2005 before switching on to take the sport of freestyle skiing in 2006. Naoya Tabara sustained a shoulder injury in 2005 when he was professional artistic gymnast which caused him to choose aerials freestyle skiing. He participated at the 2018 Winter Olympics and competed in the freestyle skiing men's aerials event.

Naoya most notably took part in the 2005 Gymnastics World Cup finishing sixth in the floor excise event. Naoya Tabara has competed in FIS World Championships and has represented Japan during the 2011 Asian Winter Games before being selected to represent Japan at the 2018 Winter Olympics. He is also the first Japanese male freestyle skier to secure a podium finish in aerials at a Skiing World Cup.
