= Olivier Rochon =

Canadian freestyle skier

Personal information
- Born: July 30, 1989 (age 36) Bucharest, Romania
- Height: 5 ft 5 in (165 cm)
- Weight: 155 lb (70 kg)

Sport
- Country: Canada
- Sport: Freestyle skiing

Achievements and titles
- Olympic finals: Pyeongchang 2018

Olivier Rochon (born July 30, 1989) is a Canadian freestyle skier. Rochon was the World Cup champion during the 2011-12 season in aerials.
