= Jonathon Lillis =

American freestyle skier (born 1994)

Personal information
- Nationality: United States
- Born: August 20, 1994 (age 31) Rochester, New York
- Height: 168 cm (5 ft 6 in)

Sport
- Sport: Skiing
- Club: Bristol Mountain Freestyle Team
Medal record
Men's freestyle skiing
FIS Freestyle World Ski Championships
| Gold medal – first place | 2017 Sierra Nevada | Aerials |

Jonathon Lillis (born August 20, 1994) is an American freestyle skier who competes internationally. He competed for Team USA at the FIS Freestyle Ski and Snowboarding World Championships 2017 in Sierra Nevada, Spain, where he won a gold medal in men's aerials. He also competed in the 2018 Winter Olympics, finishing 8th in aerials.

In the 2018 Winter Olympics opening ceremony, he wore a glass pendant with some of the ashes of his youngest brother, Michael "Mikey" Lillis, who had died unexpectedly in 2017 at 17 years old. During the men's aerials event of the 2018 Winter Olympics, Jonathon Lillis wore his late brother's Team USA ski suit.

His younger brother Christopher Lillis won an Olympic gold medal in mixed team aerials at the 2022 Winter Olympics.

He is married with three children.
