= Mischa Gasser =

Swiss freestyle skier

Personal information
- Born: 2 November 1991 (age 34) Bern, Switzerland

Sport
- Sport: Skiing

Mischa Gasser (born 2 November 1991 in Bern) is a Swiss freestyle skier, specializing in aerials.

Gasser competed at the 2014 Winter Olympics for Switzerland. He placed 14th in the first qualifying round in the aerials, failing to advance. He subsequently placed 12th in the second qualification round, again failing to advance.

As of April 2014, his best showing at the World Championships is 22nd, in the 2013 aerials.

Gasser made his World Cup debut in February 2012. As of April 2014, his best World Cup finish is 7th, at Lake Placid in 2013–14. His best World Cup overall finish in aerials is 22nd, in 2013–14.
