= Anton Kushnir =

Belarusian freestyle skier (born 1984)

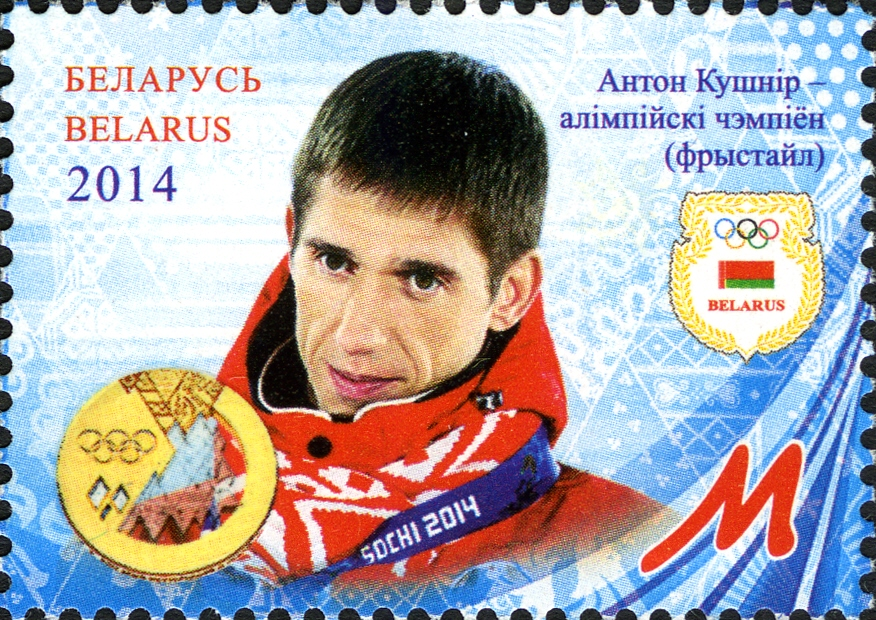

Personal information
- Born: 13 October 1984 (age 41) Chervonoarmiysk, Ukrainian SSR
- Height: 1.76 m (5 ft 9 in)
- Weight: 71 kg (157 lb)

Sport
- Sport: Freestyle skiing
- Club: Dynamo Minsk
Medal record
Representing Belarus
Olympic Games
Gold medal – first place	2014 Sochi	Aerials
FIS Freestyle World Ski Championships
Bronze medal – third place	2011 Deer Valley	Aerials

Anton Sergeyevich Kushnir (Note: Belarusian: Антон Сяргеевіч Кушнір, romanized: Anton Siarhiejevič Kušnir, IPA: [anˈton sʲarˈɣʲɛjɛvʲitʂ kuʂˈnʲir]; Ukrainian: Антон Сергійович Кушнір, romanized: Anton Serhijovyč Kušnir, IPA: [ɐnˈtɔn seɾˈɦijowɪtʃ kʊʃˈniɾ]; Russian: Антон Сергеевич Кушнир, romanized: Anton Sergejevič Kušnir, IPA: [ɐnˈton sʲɪrˈgʲejɪvʲɪtɕ kʊʂˈnʲir]; English: /ˈæntən ˈkʌʃnɜːr/ AN-tən KUSH-nur) (born 13 October 1984) is a Belarusian aerial skier who competed in the 2006, 2010 and the 2014 Winter Olympics. He has five World Cup victories. Kushnir won a bronze medal at the 2011 FIS Freestyle World Ski Championships. He won a gold medal at the 2014 Winter Olympics in Sochi, Russia, with the highest score in Olympics history.
