= Pavel Krotov =

Russian freestyle skier (1992–2023)

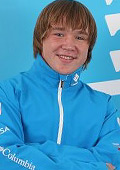

Personal information
- Full name: Pavel Vadimovich Krotov
- Nationality: Russian
- Born: 24 April 1992 Yaroslavl, Russia
- Died: 25 March 2023 (aged 30)
- Height: 1.68 m (5 ft 6 in)

Sport
- Sport: Skiing
- Club: Yaroslavl

World Cup career
- Indiv. podiums: 6
- Indiv. wins: 2
Medal record
Men's freestyle skiing
Representing Russian Ski Federation
World Championships
Gold medal – first place	2021 Almaty	Mixed team aerials
Bronze medal – third place	2021 Almaty	Aerials

Pavel Vadimovich Krotov (Russian: Павел Вадимович Кротов; 24 April 1992 – 25 March 2023) was a Russian freestyle skier, specializing in aerials.

== Career ==
Krotov competed at the 2014 Winter Olympics for Russia. He placed 9th in the first qualifying round in the aerials, failing to advance. He subsequently placed 3rd in the second qualification round, enough to progress to the final. In the first jump of the three-jump final, he finished 10th, not enough to advance further.

As of April 2014, his best showing at the World Championships was 18th, in the 2011 aerials.

Krotov made his World Cup debut in January 2011. As of April 2014, he had one World Cup victory, at Mont Gabriel in 2011–12. His best World Cup overall finish in aerials was 8th, in 2013–14.

== Death ==
On March 25, 2023, he died in his sleep, at the age of 30, from a brain hemorrhage.

== World Cup podiums ==
=== Individual podiums ===
- 2 wins
- 6 podiums

Season	Date	Location	Place
2011–12	15 January 2012	Mont Gabriel, Canada	1st
2014–15	20 December 2014	Beijing, China	2nd
2019–20	15 February 2020	Moscow, Russia	1st
2019–20	8 March 2020	Krasnoyarsk, Russia	2nd
2020–21	4 December 2020	Ruka, Finland	2nd
2020–21	16 January 2021	Yaroslavl, Russia	2nd

=== Team podiums ===
- 1 win
- 4 podiums

Season	Date	Location	Place	Teammate(s)
2014–15	21 February 2014	Beijing, China	2nd	Veronika Korsunova; Ilya Burov
2014–15	31 January 2015	Lake Placid, United States	3rd	Veronika Korsunova; Ilya Burov
2015–16	20 December 2015	Beijing, China	3rd	Alexandra Orlova; Vasily Polenov
2019–20	22 December 2019	Shimao Lotus Mountain, China	1st	Liubov Nikitina; Maxim Burov
