= Ildar Badrutdinov =

Kazakhstani freestyle skier (born 2000)

Personal information
- Nationality: Kazakhstani
- Born: 12 January 2000 (age 26)
- Height: 1.72 m (5 ft 8 in)

Sport
- Sport: Freestyle skiing

Ildar Badrutdinov (Russian: Ильдар Радикович Бадрутдинов; born 12 January 2000) is a Kazakhstani freestyle skier. He competed in the 2018 Winter Olympics.
