= Noé Roth =

Swiss freestyle skier (born 2000)

Personal information
- Nationality: Swiss
- Born: 27 December 2000 (age 25) Brienz, Switzerland
- Height: 1.78 m (5 ft 10 in)
- Weight: 63 kg (139 lb)

Sport
- Country: Switzerland
- Sport: Freestyle skiing
- Event: Aerials
- Club: Freestyle Company Jumpin
Medal record
Men's freestyle skiing
Representing Switzerland
Olympic Games
Silver medal – second place	2026 Milano Cortina	Aerials
Silver medal – second place	2026 Milano Cortina	Mixed team aerials
World Championships
Gold medal – first place	2019 Utah	Mixed team aerials
Gold medal – first place	2023 Bakuriani	Aerials
Gold medal – first place	2025 Engadin	Aerials
Silver medal – second place	2021 Almaty	Mixed team aerials
Bronze medal – third place	2019 Utah	Aerials
Bronze medal – third place	2025 Engadin	Mixed team aerials

Noé Roth (born 27 December 2000) is a Swiss freestyle skier. He competed in the 2018 Winter Olympics.

He participated at the FIS Freestyle Ski and Snowboarding World Championships 2019, winning a medal.

Came in first of the 22/23 season winning the crystal globe in Almaty.

His mother is Colette Brand, Swiss freestyle skier and Olympic medalist.
