= Stanislau Hladchenka =

Belarusian freestyle skier

Personal information
- Nationality: Belarusian
- Born: 14 September 1994 (age 31) Minsk, Belarus

Sport
- Country: Belarus
- Sport: Freestyle skiing

Stanislau Hladchenka (Belarusian: Станiслаў Гладчэнка) (born 14 September 1994) is a Belarusian male freestyle skier. He competed in the men's aerials event during the 2018 Winter Olympics.
