= Alex Bowen (skier) =

American freestyle skier

Medal record

Men's freestyle skiing

Representing United States

World Championships
Silver medal – second place	2015 Kreischberg	Aerials

Alex Bowen is an American freestyle skier. He won a silver medal in aerials at the FIS Freestyle Ski and Snowboarding World Championships 2015.
