= Eric Loughran =

American freestyle skier

Personal information
- Born: April 12, 1995 (age 31) Lowell, Massachusetts, U.S.
- Height: 5 ft 10 in (178 cm)
- Weight: 165 lb (75 kg)

Sport
- Country: United States
- Sport: Freestyle skiing
- Event: Aerials
- Club: Loon Mountain Freestyle
Medal record
Men's freestyle skiing
Representing the United States
World Championships
Bronze medal – third place	2021 Almaty	Mixed team aerials

Eric Loughran (born April 12, 1995) is an American male freestyle skier. He competed in the men's aerials at the 2018 Winter Olympics. He competed at the 2022 Winter Olympics.
