= Deer Valley =

Ski resort in Park City, Utah, US

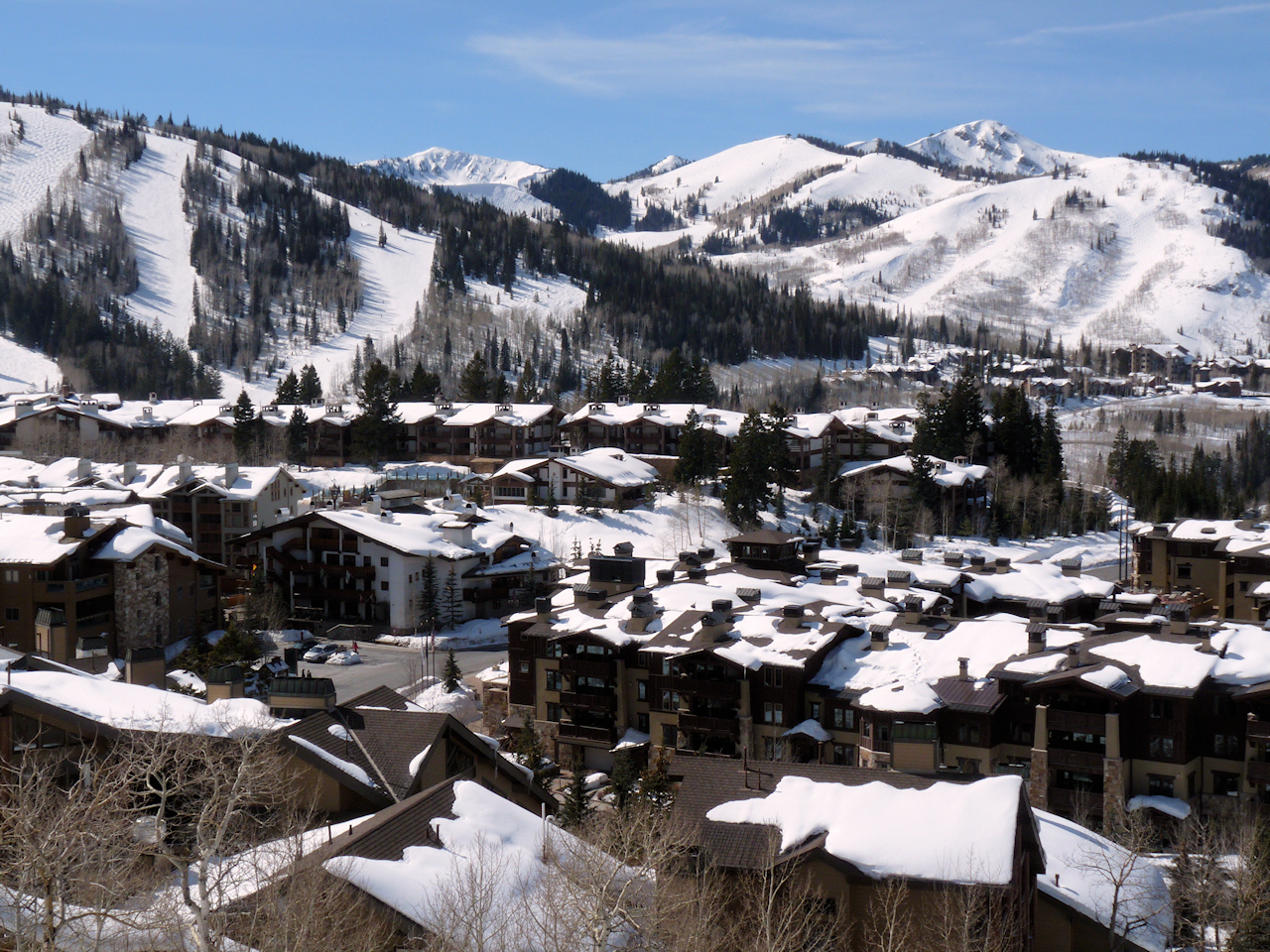
- Overview of a portion of the resort's Flagstaff Mountain terrain in 2009

- Location in Utah Deer Valley (the United States)
- Location: Wasatch Range; Summit County, Utah; United States
- Nearest city: Park City, Utah
- Coordinates: 40°37′22″N 111°29′22″W
- Status: Operating
- Owner: Alterra Mountain Company
- Vertical: 3,040 ft (930 m)
- Top elevation: 9,570 ft (2,920 m)
- Base elevation: 6,530 ft (1,990 m)
- Skiable area: 4,300 acres (1,700 ha)
- Trails: 202; 35% easiest 44% more difficult 21% most difficult
- Longest run: 4.8 mi (7.7 km)
- Lift system: 36: 2 Gondolas; 2 High-speed six packs; 20 High-speed quad chairlifts; 1 Quad chairlift; 5 Triple chairlifts; 1 Double chairlift; 5 Magic carpets
- Lift capacity: 85,360 skiers/hr
- Terrain parks: No
- Snowfall: Base: <150 inches (380 cm); Peak: 294 inches (750 cm)
- Snowmaking: Yes, over 886 acres (359 ha)
- Night skiing: No
- Website: deervalley.com

Deer Valley is a ski-only resort in the Wasatch Range, located 36 miles (58 km) east of Salt Lake City, in Park City, Utah, United States, where snowboarding is prohibited.

Deer Valley was one of the venues for the 2002 Winter Olympics, hosting the freestyle moguls, aerial, and alpine slalom events. It is scheduled to host the freestyle skiing moguls and aerials events at the 2034 Winter Olympics. Deer Valley also regularly hosts competitions for the International Ski Federation for moguls and aerials, but is not steep enough nor does it have long enough terrain to host events such as the GS, Super G, or Downhill.

== Resort profile ==
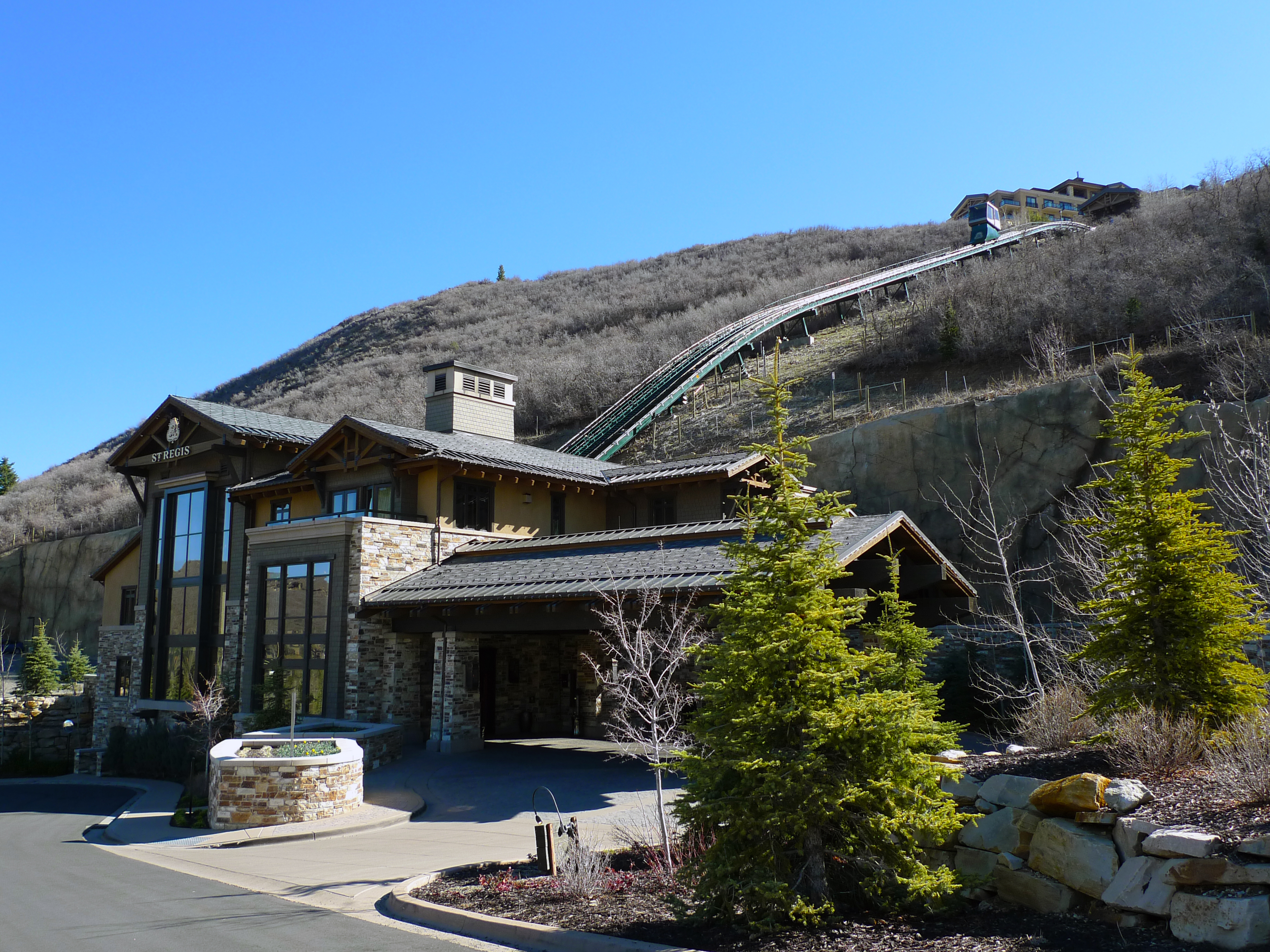
The St. Regis Resort at Deer Valley

Deer Valley is exclusively for skiers and it emphasizes on upscale accommodations and amenities. Deer Valley appeals to the ski community due to it being one of three resorts in the nation that is ski only.

== History ==
=== Mountain development ===
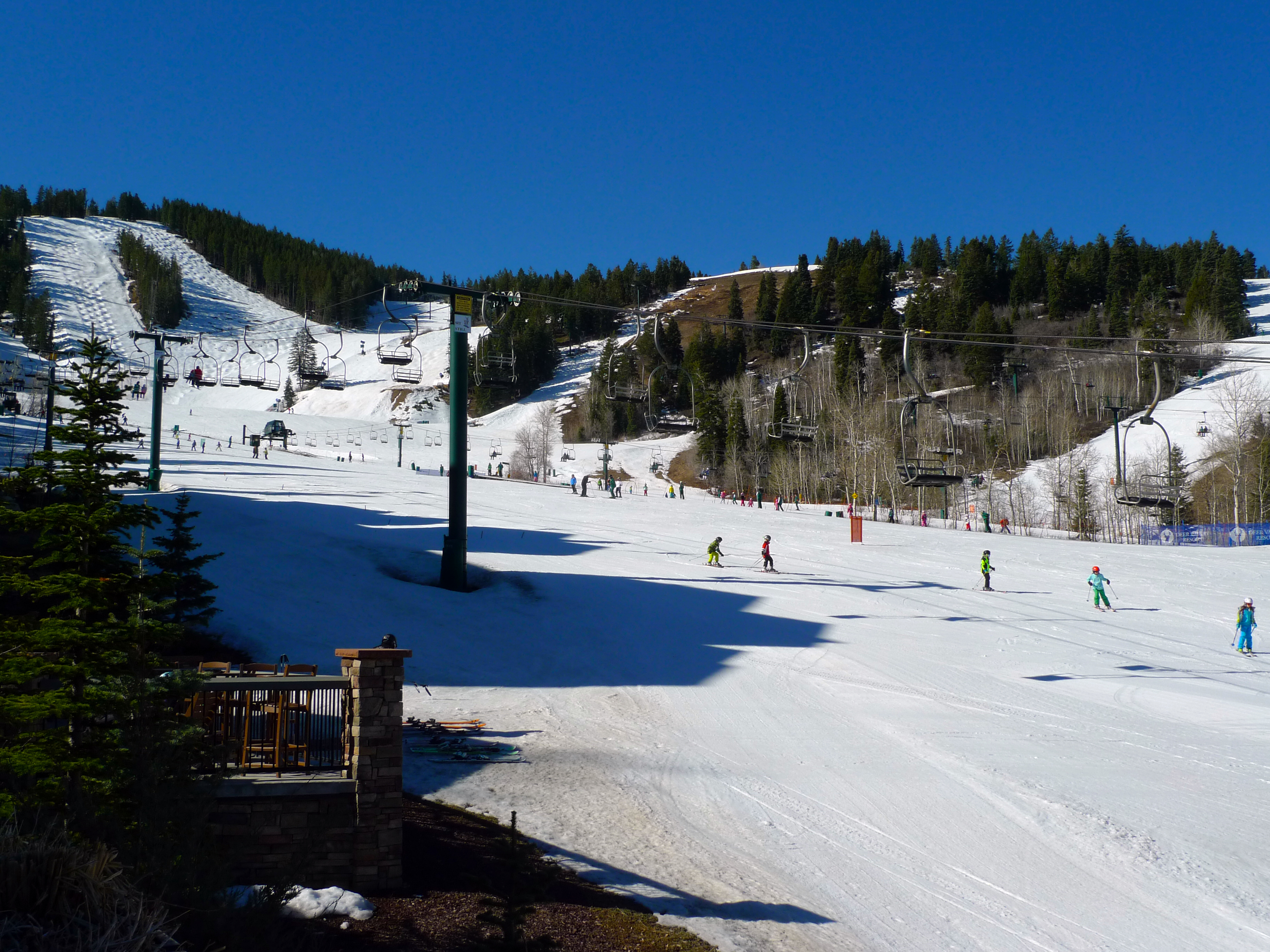
Skiing at Deer Valley Utah

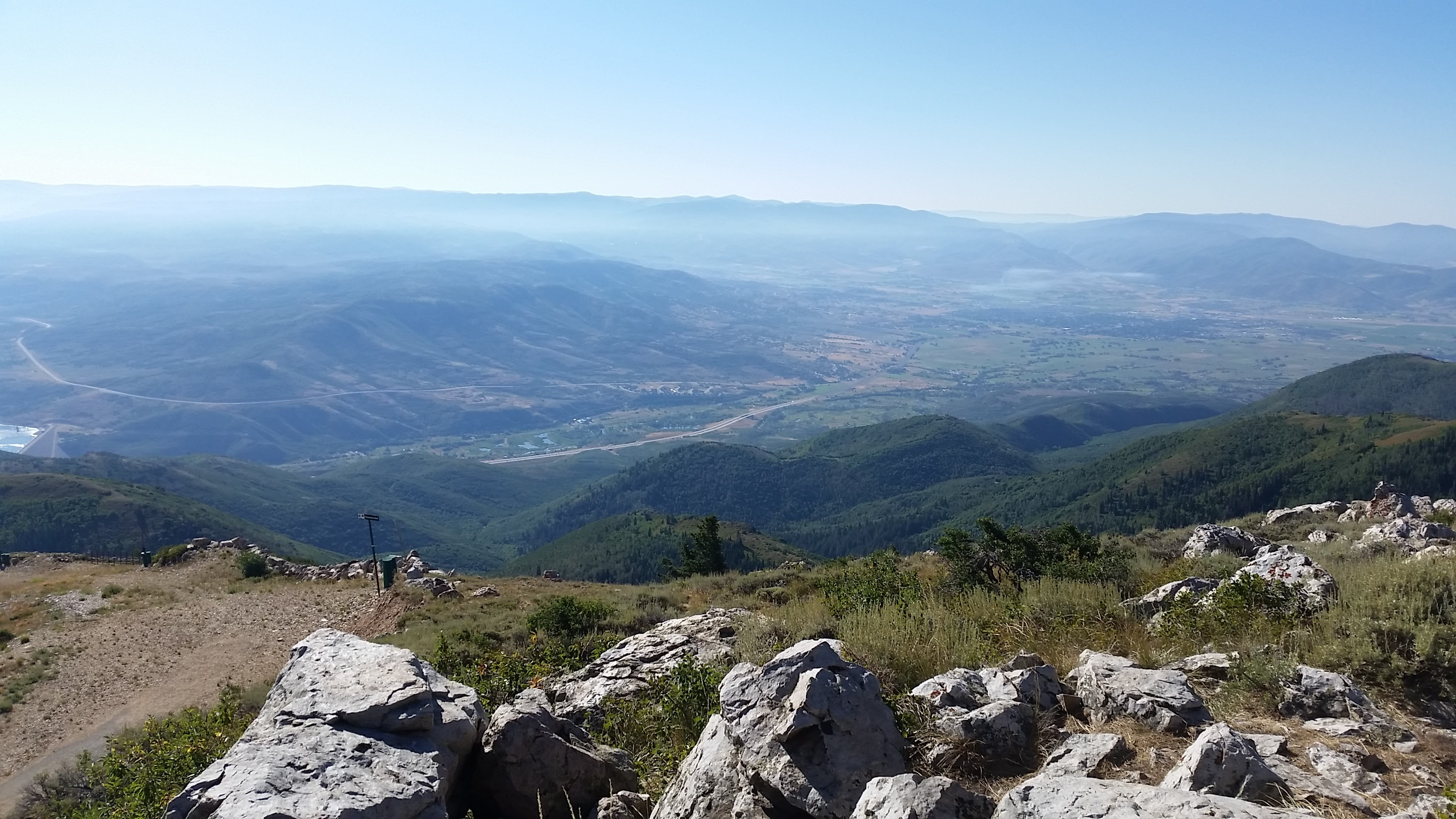
A view down the backside of Deer Valley's summit in the summertime

Skiing began at Deer Valley with the Park City Winter Carnivals of the 1930s, and the Works Progress Administration (WPA) built the first ski trails and other facilities during the winter of 1936–1937. The first ski lifts appeared in 1946, when local residents Robert Emmett Burns, Sr. and Otto Carpenter constructed them, largely from nearby lodgepole pines. The ski area was called the Snow Park Ski Area, a name which endured from 1946 to 1969. Deer Valley Resort, developed by Edgar Stern, officially opened on December 26, 1981. It has grown to include six mountains with six bowls, 930 acres (380 ha) of glade skiing and 670 acres (270 ha) of snow-making. The resort totals 2,026 acres (820 ha) in size at the time.

=== Expansion and improvements ===
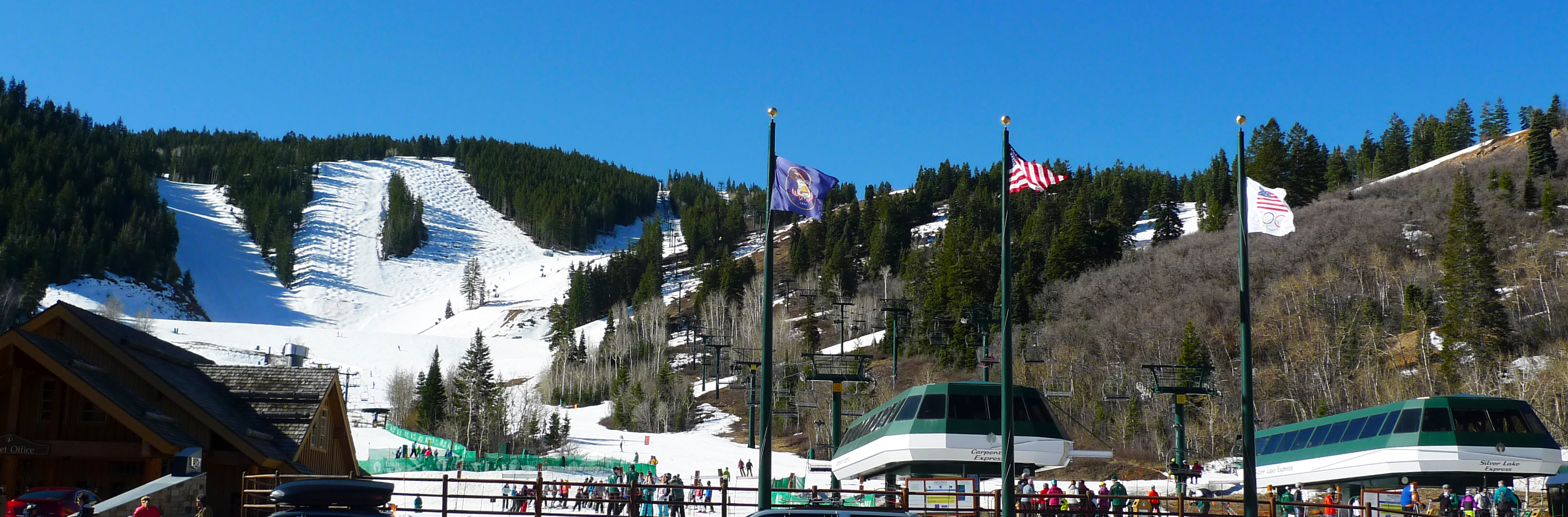
Deer Valley Ski Resort Park City Utah

In 2007, the resort expanded onto Lady Morgan Peak, to the north of Flagstaff Mountain, with a new 200 acre pod composed of nine trails and additional gladed terrain serviced by its own high speed quad.

In 2012, detachable chairlift service was added to Little Baldy Peak with the replacement of Deer Crest with a Doppelmayr high speed quad, known as the Mountaineer Express.

In September 2023, the resort announced that it would integrate the Mayflower ski area, which is adjacent to the resort's eastern boundary, into Deer Valley. As of 2026, the resort now totals 4,300 acres.

The expansion has continued with 3 new lifts in the 2024/25 season and 7 new lifts in 2025/26. There are 80 new runs and this will increase to over 100 new runs, tripling the size of the ski area from 2,026 acres to 4,300 acres.

== International competitions ==
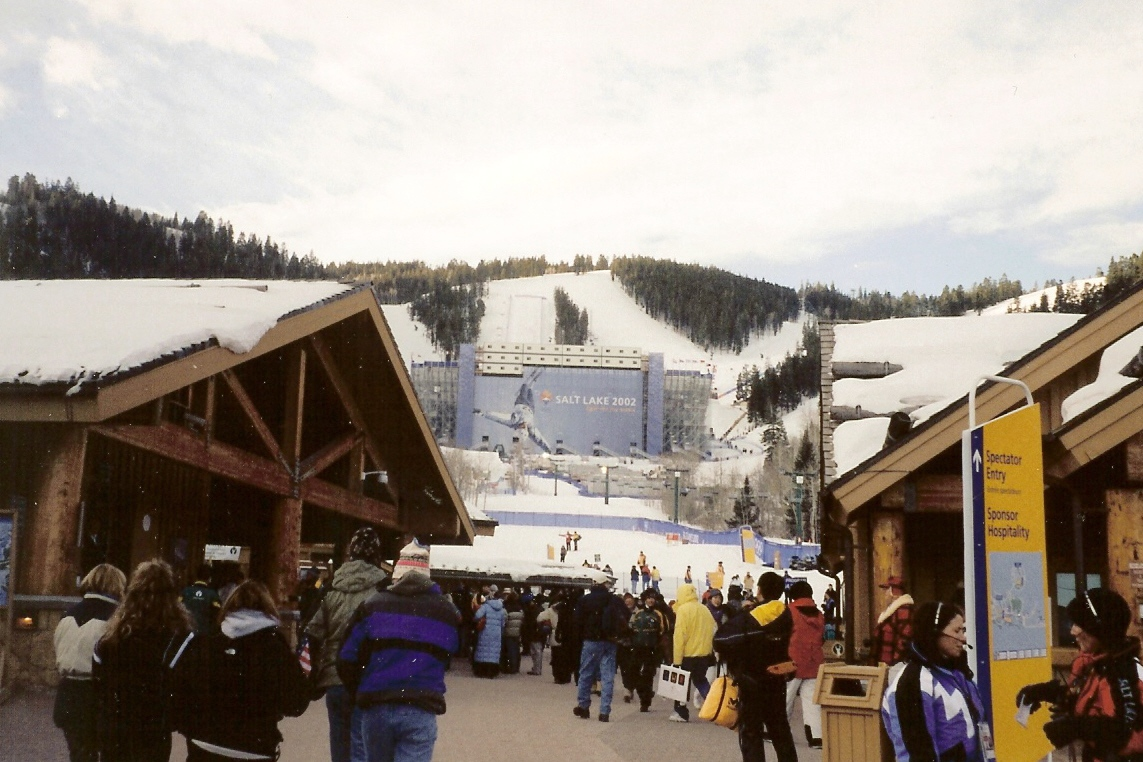
The aerials venue at the resort during the 2002 Winter Olympics

=== 2002 Olympic Winter Games ===
During the 2002 games Deer Valley hosted the freestyle moguls and aerials, and alpine men's and women's slalom events. Three of the trails on Bald Eagle Mountain were used during the games including Champion (site of freestyle moguls), Know You Don't (site of alpine slalom), and White Owl (site of freestyle aerials). Temporary spectator stadiums were located at the end of each run, they were 12 stories tall and included seating for 10,000 people, while spectator standing areas were located along the sides of each course; the standing areas and stadium combined allowed roughly 13,300 spectators to view each event. 99.4 percent of available tickets for events at the venue were sold, which totaled 96,980 spectators witnessing competitions at the resort. During the games 95 percent of Deer Valley remained open to the public for normal seasonal operations.

=== World Cup events ===
The resort hosted the 2003 and the 2011 FIS Freestyle World Ski Championships, becoming the first American venue to host twice. It also hosted the men's and women's moguls and aerials events for FIS Freestyle Ski and Snowboarding World Championships 2019.

Deer Valley is a regular host to FIS World Cup events, having hosted men's and women's mogul and aerial competitions yearly since 2000 (with the exceptions of 2003 and 2004). The resort also hosted a skicross event in 2008. Deer Valley continued to host FIS Freestyle World Cup events in 2025, including men's and women's moguls and dual moguls competitions. Deer Valley's track record of event hosting has led it to be described as "a Mecca for freestyle skiing events".

== Snowboard prohibition ==
Deer Valley is one of three remaining American ski resorts that prohibit snowboarders along with Alta and Mad River Glen. The resort has occasionally been the subject of protests and poaching by snowboarders such as when snowboard manufacturer Burton Snowboards offered $5,000 for video footage of riders snowboarding at Alta, Deer Valley or Mad River Glen in late 2007. According to Burton's website, the point of their campaign was that such discrimination displays a "blatant aggressive disregard" for the Constitution of the United States. Since its opening in 1981, snowboarding has never been allowed, and the interpretation posited by Burton of a constitutional right to use a snowboard has failed to gain traction given the wide availability of rental skis and the fact that other vehicles like sleds and snowmobiles are also prohibited at the resort.

== Climate and terrain ==
This climatic region is typified by large seasonal temperature differences, with warm to hot (and often humid) summers and cold (sometimes severely cold) winters. According to the Köppen Climate Classification system, Deer Valley has a humid continental climate, abbreviated "Dfb" on climate maps. The terrain of the resort is largely mellow as 30% of the terrain is classified as "beginner" and 44% "intermediate." Expert terrain is present, however. The Daly Chutes are Deer Valley's only true "expert terrain."

Terrain Aspects: North 45%, South 2%, East 45%, West 8%.

== Chairlifts ==
Name	Year opened	Manufacturer	Lift type	Length	Location
Aurora	2024	Doppelmayr	Fixed-Grip Quad	199m	Keetley Point
Burns Express	2022	Doppelmayr	Detachable Quad	311m	Bald Eagle Mountain
Carpenter Express	1996	Garaventa CTEC	Detachable Quad	1474m	Bald Eagle Mountain
Crown Point	1990	Yan	Fixed-Grip Triple	425m	Bald Eagle Mountain
East Village Express Gondola	2025	Doppelmayr	Ten-Person Gondola	4766m	Park Peak
Empire Express	1998	Garaventa CTEC	Detachable Quad	1471m	Empire Canyon
Galena Express	2025	Doppelmayr	Detachable Quad	1430m	Keetley Point
Homestake Express	2018	Doppelmayr	Detachable Quad	521m	Bald Eagle Mountain
Hoodoo Express	2024	Doppelmayr	Detachable Quad	321m	Keetley Point
Jordanelle Express Gondola	1998	Garaventa CTEC	Four-Person Gondola	1576m	Little Baldy Peak
Judge	2004	Doppelmayr	Fixed-Grip Triple	212m	Flagstaff Mountain
Keetley Express	2024	Doppelmayr	Detachable Six-Pack	2034m	Keetley Point
Lady Morgan Express	2007	Doppelmayr	Detachable Quad	835m	Lady Morgan Peak
Mayflower	1984	Yan	Fixed-Grip Triple	1065m	Bald Mountain
Mountaineer Express	2012	Doppelmayr	Detachable Quad	904m	Little Baldy Peak
Neptune Express	2025	Doppelmayr	Detachable Quad	1056m	Pioche Point
Northside Express	1993	Garaventa CTEC	Detachable Quad	1138m	Flagstaff Mountain
Pinyon Express	2025	Doppelmayr	Detachable Six-Pack	928m	Park Peak
Pioche Express	2025	Doppelmayr	Detachable Quad	1402m	Pioche Point
Quincy Express	2001	Garaventa CTEC	Detachable Quad	1263m	Flagstaff Mountain
Red Cloud	1990	Yan	Fixed-Grip Triple	783m	Flagstaff Mountain
Revelator Express	2025	Doppelmayr	Detachable Quad	1219m	Park Peak
Ruby Express	2002	Garaventa CTEC	Detachable Quad	727m	Flagstaff Mountain
Silver Lake Express	1999	Garaventa CTEC	Detachable Quad	2015m	Bald Eagle Mountain
Silver Strike Express	2004	Doppelmayr	Detachable Quad	1559m	Flagstaff Mountain
Snowflake	1993	CTEC	Fixed-Grip Double	334m	Bald Eagle Mountain
Sterling Express	2006	Doppelmayr	Detachable Quad	1428m	Bald Mountain
Sultan Express	2005	Doppelmayr	Detachable Quad	1522m	Bald Mountain
Viking	1990	Yan	Fixed-Grip Triple	181m	Flagstaff Mountain
Vulcan Express	2025	Doppelmayr	Detachable Quad	1698m	Big Dutch Peak
Wasatch Express	1996	Garaventa CTEC	Detachable Quad	1280m	Bald Mountain
