= Maxim Gustik =

Belarusian freestyle skier (1988–2023)

Medal record

Men's freestyle skiing

Representing Belarus

World Championships
Bronze medal – third place	2015 Kreischberg	Aerials

Maxim Vyachaslavavich Gustik (Belarusian: Максім Вячаслававіч Гусцік; 1 May 1988 – 9 December 2023) was a Belarusian freestyle skier. He won a bronze medal in aerials at the FIS Freestyle Ski and Snowboarding World Championships 2015. In December 2017, Maxim Gustik won a silver medal with 117.26 points at the Freestyle Ski Aerial World Cup. He died in a traffic collision on 9 December 2023, at the age of 35.
