= FIS Freestyle World Ski Championships 2013 – Men's aerials =

The men's aerials competition of the FIS Freestyle World Ski Championships 2013 was held at Myrkdalen-Voss, Norway on March 6 (qualifying) and March 7 (finals). 31 athletes from 12 countries competed.

== Qualification ==
The following are the results of the qualification.

Rank	Bib	Name	Country	Q1	Q2	Notes
1	3	Qi Guangpu	China	128.51		Q
2	1	Jia Zongyang	China	127.44		Q
3	6	Dmitri Dashinski	Belarus	119.47		Q
4	9	Liu Zhongqing	China	119.03		Q
5	20	Petr Medulich	Russia	118.10		Q
6	5	Travis Gerrits	Canada	117.26		Q
7	2	David Morris	Australia	70.80	118.55	Q
8	32	Ilya Burov	Russia	110.84	117.70	Q
9	11	Guillaume Lebert	France	111.95	115.84	Q
10	13	Wu Chao	China	84.07	114.03	Q
11	4	Dylan Ferguson	United States	110.86	112.83	Q
12	18	Christopher Lambert	Switzerland	101.03	111.06	Q
13	15	Aleksei Grishin	Belarus	108.85	109.75	
14	16	Andreas Isoz	Switzerland	109.38	108.85	
15	7	Maxim Gustik	Belarus	100.03	94.69	
16	8	Denis Osipau	Belarus	105.21	89.38	
17	23	Naoya Tabara	Japan	69.25	87.61	
18	10	Thomas Lambert	Switzerland	85.07	85.40	
19	21	Jean-Christophe Andre	Canada	111.37	78.32	
20	22	Timofei Slivets	Russia	53.10	76.47	
21	12	Michael Rossi	United States	52.65	76.40	
22	26	Mischa Gasser	Switzerland	64.51	71.20	
23	29	Clyde Getty	Argentina	48.23	68.73	
24	17	Jonathon Lillis	United States	80.09	62.89	
25	19	Nevin Brown	United States	66.06	52.65	
26	30	Harry Gillam	Great Britain	65.83	52.29	
27	27	Baglan Inkarbek	Kazakhstan	74.65	43.79	
28	28	Lloyd Wallace	Great Britain	34.80	42.21	
	14	Olivier Rochon	Canada	DNS	DNS	
	24	Mykola Puzderko	Ukraine	DNS	DNS	
	25	Sergei Berestovskiy	Kazakhstan	DNS	DNS	

== Final ==
The following are the results of the finals.

Rank	Bib	Name	Country	Final 1	Final 2	Final 3
1st place, gold medalist(s)	3	Qi Guangpu	China	123.45	127.60	138.00
2nd place, silver medalist(s)	5	Travis Gerrits	Canada	123.90	124.89	117.73
3rd place, bronze medalist(s)	1	Jia Zongyang	China	119.03	128.05	99.09
4	9	Liu Zhongqing	China	121.24	122.17	78.16
5	2	David Morris	Australia	115.93	117.19	
6	11	Guillaume Lebert	France	116.82	113.57	
7	18	Christopher Lambert	Switzerland	115.93	113.56	
8	13	Wu Chao	China	114.60	107.24	
9	32	Ilya Burov	Russia	114.16		
10	20	Petr Medulich	Russia	106.79		
11	4	Dylan Ferguson	United States	105.31		
12	6	Dmitri Dashinski	Belarus	80.09		
