= Freestyle skiing at the 2014 Winter Olympics – Men's aerials =

Men's aerials at the XXII Olympic Winter Games
- Venue: Rosa Khutor Extreme Park, Krasnaya Polyana, Russia
- Dates: 17 February 2014
- Competitors: 21 from 9 nations

Medalists
1st place, gold medalist(s)		Anton Kushnir	Belarus
2nd place, silver medalist(s)		David Morris	Australia
3rd place, bronze medalist(s)		Jia Zongyang	China

The men's aerials event in freestyle skiing at the 2014 Winter Olympics in Sochi, Russia took place 17 February 2014.

== Results ==
=== Qualification 1 ===
The qualification 1 was held at 17:45.

Rank	Bib	Name	Country	Score	Note
1	9	Jia Zongyang	China	118.59	Q
2	6	David Morris	Australia	118.59	Q
3	11	Renato Ulrich	Switzerland	115.84	Q
4	2	Qi Guangpu	China	113.57	Q
5	7	Wu Chao	China	110.62	Q
6	12	Oleksandr Abramenko	Ukraine	109.50	Q
7	3	Anton Kushnir	Belarus	107.52	
8	13	Dmitri Dashinski	Belarus	106.64	
9	8	Pavel Krotov	Russia	106.33	
10	19	Ilya Burov	Russia	105.88	
11	14	Mac Bohonnon	United States	104.79	
12	26	Mykola Puzderko	Ukraine	98.41	
13	18	Thomas Lambert	Switzerland	96.83	
14	22	Mischa Gasser	Switzerland	96.52	
15	25	Timofei Slivets	Russia	87.33	
16	27	Sergei Berestovskiy	Kazakhstan	82.84	
17	23	Denis Osipau	Belarus	81.86	
18	1	Liu Zhongqing	China	80.09	
19	5	Travis Gerrits	Canada	76.92	
20	4	Aleksei Grishin	Belarus	76.82	
21	28	Baglan Inkarbek	Kazakhstan	60.16	

=== Qualification 2 ===
The qualification 2 was held at 18:30.

Rank	Bib	Name	Country	Score	Note
1	13	Dmitri Dashinski	Belarus	117.19	Q
2	3	Anton Kushnir	Belarus	115.38	Q
3	8	Pavel Krotov	Russia	115.05	Q
4	5	Travis Gerrits	Canada	112.39	Q
5	23	Denis Osipau	Belarus	111.05	Q
6	14	Mac Bohonnon	United States	110.18	Q
7	25	Timofei Slivets	Russia	108.41	
8	18	Thomas Lambert	Switzerland	89.38	
9	4	Aleksei Grishin	Belarus	88.94	
10	19	Ilya Burov	Russia	86.73	
11	27	Sergei Berestovskiy	Kazakhstan	85.30	
12	22	Mischa Gasser	Switzerland	83.91	
13	28	Baglan Inkarbek	Kazakhstan	79.31	
14	26	Mykola Puzderko	Ukraine	77.88	
15	1	Liu Zhongqing	China	77.83	

=== Finals ===
The finals were started at 21:30.

Rank	Bib	Name	Country	Round 1	Rank	Round 2	Rank	Round 3	Rank
1st place, gold medalist(s)	3	Anton Kushnir	Belarus	119.03	2	115.84	3	134.50	1
2nd place, silver medalist(s)	6	David Morris	Australia	101.87	8	115.05	4	110.41	2
3rd place, bronze medalist(s)	9	Jia Zongyang	China	110.41	4	117.70	1	95.06	3
4	2	Qi Guangpu	China	121.24	1	116.74	2	90.00	4
5	14	Mac Bohonnon	United States	105.21	7	113.72	5	did not advance	
6	12	Oleksandr Abramenko	Ukraine	119.03	3	113.12	6	did not advance	
7	5	Travis Gerrits	Canada	107.29	6	111.95	7	did not advance	
8	13	Dmitri Dashinski	Belarus	108.41	5	100.45	8	did not advance	
9	23	Denis Osipau	Belarus	99.36	9	did not advance			
10	8	Pavel Krotov	Russia	96.46	10	did not advance			
11	7	Wu Chao	China	82.30	11	did not advance			
12	11	Renato Ulrich	Switzerland	80.53	12	did not advance			
