= Freestyle skiing at the 2007 Asian Winter Games =

- Venue: Beida Lake Skiing Resort
- Dates: 31 January – 1 February 2007
- Competitors: 13 from 4 nations

Freestyle skiing at the 2007 Asian Winter Games was held at the Beida Lake Skiing Resort in Changchun, China from 31 January to 1 February 2007.

China dominated the competition winning both gold medals.

== Schedule ==
Q	Qualification	F	Final

Event↓/Date →	31st Wed		1st Thu	
Men's aerials			Q	F
Women's aerials	Q	F		

== Medalists ==
Event	Gold	Silver	Bronze
Men's aerials	Han Xiaopeng; China	Qiu Sen; China	Liu Zhongqing; China
Men's aerials	Han Xiaopeng; China	Qiu Sen; China	Kotaro Kurata; Japan
Women's aerials	Li Nina; China	Xu Mengtao; China	Zhang Xin; China
Women's aerials	Li Nina; China	Xu Mengtao; China	Ünenbatyn Maral; Mongolia

== Medal table ==
Rank	Nation	Gold	Silver	Bronze	Total
1	China (CHN)	2	2	2	6
2	Japan (JPN)	0	0	1	1
2	Mongolia (MGL)	0	0	1	1
Totals (3 entries)		2	2	4	8

== Participating nations ==
A total of 13 athletes from 4 nations competed in freestyle skiing at the 2007 Asian Winter Games:

- China (8)
- Chinese Taipei (1)
- Japan (2)
- Mongolia (2)
