= Freestyle skiing at the 2007 Asian Winter Games – Men's aerials =

Men's aerials at the 2007 Asian Winter Games
- Venue: Beida Lake Skiing Resort
- Dates: 1 February 2007
- Competitors: 8 from 4 nations

Medalists
| gold medal | Han Xiaopeng | China |
| silver medal | Qiu Sen | China |
| bronze medal | Liu Zhongqing | China |
| bronze medal | Kotaro Kurata | Japan |

The men's aerials at the 2007 Asian Winter Games was held on 1 February 2007 at Beida Lake Skiing Resort in Jilin, China.

== Schedule ==
All times are China Standard Time (UTC+08:00)

| Date | Time | Event |
|---|---|---|
| Thursday, 1 February 2007 | 10:00 | Qualification |
| Thursday, 1 February 2007 | 10:40 | Final |

== Results ==
Legend

- DNS — Did not start

| Rank | Athlete | Qual. | Final | Total |
|---|---|---|---|---|
| 1st place, gold medalist(s) | Han Xiaopeng (CHN) | 113.05 | 110.84 | 223.89 |
| 2nd place, silver medalist(s) | Qiu Sen (CHN) | 95.35 | 120.28 | 215.63 |
| 3rd place, bronze medalist(s) | Liu Zhongqing (CHN) | 114.81 | 84.74 | 199.55 |
| 4 | Li Ke (CHN) | 85.17 | 101.65 | 186.82 |
| 3rd place, bronze medalist(s) | Kotaro Kurata (JPN) | 91.96 | 65.27 | 157.23 |
| 6 | James Hillier (TPE) | 58.00 | 65.62 | 123.62 |
| 7 | Otgonbayaryn Ochirbat (MGL) | 46.22 | 44.30 | 90.52 |
| — | Ken Mizuno (JPN) | | | DNS |

- Kotaro Kurata was awarded bronze because of no three-medal sweep per country rule.
