= Freestyle skiing at the 2011 Asian Winter Games – Men's aerials =

Men's aerials at the 2011 Asian Winter Games
- Venue: Tabagan Sport and Recreation Complex
- Dates: 1 February 2011
- Competitors: 6 from 4 nations

Medalists
gold medal	Jia Zongyang	China
silver medal	Liu Zhongqing	China
bronze medal	Ruslan Ablyatifov	Kazakhstan

The men's aerials at the 2011 Asian Winter Games was held on 1 February 2011 at Tabagan Sport and Recreation Complex in Almaty, Kazakhstan.

== Schedule ==
All times are Almaty Time (UTC+06:00)

Date	Time	Event
Tuesday, 1 February 2011	10:20	Final

== Results ==
Legend

- DNS — Did not start

Rank	Athlete	Jump 1	Jump 2	Total
1st place, gold medalist(s)	Jia Zongyang (CHN)	109.55	111.15	220.70
2nd place, silver medalist(s)	Liu Zhongqing (CHN)	108.13	102.03	210.16
3rd place, bronze medalist(s)	Ruslan Ablyatifov (KAZ)	90.06	90.24	180.30
4	Sergey Berestovskiy (KAZ)	57.33	92.70	150.03
5	Naoya Tabara (JPN)	44.08	82.05	126.13
—	Ganzorigiin Sodbayar (MGL)			DNS
