= Freestyle skiing at the 2014 Winter Olympics – Qualification =

The following is about the qualification rules and the quota allocation for the freestyle skiing events at the 2014 Winter Olympics.

== Qualification standard ==
An athlete must have placed in the top 30 in at a World Cup event after July 2012 or at the 2013 World Championships in that respective event and also have a minimum number of FIS points (80 for all events, except slopestyle which is 50 points).

A total of 282 quota spots are available to athletes to compete at the games. A maximum of 26 athletes can be entered by a National Olympic Committee, with a maximum of 14 men or 14 women.

== Allocation of quotas ==
At the end of the qualification period of January 19, 2014 quotas will be awarded using the Olympic Quota Allocation List (which includes all results of the World Cups from July 2012 and the results of the 2013 World Championship). The spots will be awarded to each country per athlete appearing on the list starting at number one per event until a maximum for each event is reached. Once an NOC has reached the maximum of 4 quota spots in an event, it will no longer be counted for the allocation of quotas. If a nation goes over the total of 14 per sex or 26 total it is up to that nation to select its team to meet the rules by January 22, 2014. Any vacated spots will be then awarded in that event starting from the first athlete not to be awarded a quota.

Maximum athletes per event

Event	Aerials	Halfpipe	Moguls	Ski cross	Slopestyle	Total
Men	25	30	30	32	30	147
Women	25	24	30	32	24	135
TOTAL	50	54	60	64	54	282

== Qualification summary ==
Assigned quota list was published on January 25. The original quota distribution before reallocation.

NOC	Men					Women					Total
NOC	Moguls	Aerials	Ski cross	Halfpipe	Slopestyle	Moguls	Aerials	Ski cross	Halfpipe	Slopestyle	Total
Australia	4	1	2		1	3	4	3	2	1	21
Austria			4	2	1			3		1	11
Belarus		4					~~3~~ 2				7
Belgium								~~1~~	1		1
Brazil							1				1
British Virgin Islands				1							1
Canada	4	~~3~~ 1	~~4~~ 3	4	~~2~~ 1	4	~~1~~	~~4~~ 3	~~3~~ 2	4	26
Chile								1		1	2
China		4				1	4				9
Czech Republic			1		1	2		2			6
Finland	4		1	1	~~3~~ 4						9
France	3		4	4	3	1		4	2		21
Germany			4		1	~~2~~ 1		~~4~~ 2	1	1	10
Great Britain				2	1				2	1	6
Italy	1				1	1				1	4
Japan	2	~~1~~		~~3~~ 1		4			~~3~~ 2	~~3~~ 1	10
Kazakhstan	3	2				2	2				9
New Zealand				4	2				1	1	8
Norway	~~1~~		3	1	4	1		~~2~~ 1	~~1~~	1	11
Paraguay										1	1
Poland								1			1
Russia	4	4	2	1	1	4	~~4~~ 3	3	2	1	26
Slovakia										2	2
Slovenia			1					~~1~~			1
South Korea	1			1		2			1		5
Spain									1		1
Sweden	2		3		3			2		1	11
Switzerland		4	3	~~4~~ 3	4		1	4	3	2	24
Ukraine		2					4				7
United States	~~4~~ 2	~~4~~ 1	~~2~~ 1	4	4	4	~~4~~ 2		4	4	26
Total: 30 NOCs	30	~~25~~ 23	32	~~30~~ 29	~~30~~ 32	30	~~25~~ 23	~~32~~ 29	24	24	276

=== Next eligible NOC per event ===
If a country rejects a quota spot or reduces its team (in the case of Canada and the United States) then additional quotas become available. Countries in bold indicate that country received a rejected quota spot. Here the top 10 eligible countries per event (some events have less). Note: a country can be eligible for more than one quota spot per event in the reallocation process. Countries in bold have gotten a reallocation of a quota spot in the respective event. The reallocation quota's have been added to the table above.

Men

Moguls	Aerials	Ski Cross	Halfpipe	Slopestyle
**Russia**; ~~France~~; ~~Sweden~~; **Kazakhstan**; **Kazakhstan**; Sweden; Japan; Norway; Japan; Switzerland; Sweden	**Russia**; **Ukraine**; **Kazakhstan**; **Kazakhstan**; ~~Ukraine~~; ~~Great Britain~~; ~~Great Britain~~	**Russia**; **Switzerland**; Norway; Switzerland; Sweden; Italy; Italy; Russia; Russia; Japan	**Austria**; **South Korea**; ~~Russia~~; ~~Japan~~	~~Japan~~; ~~France~~; **Czech Republic**; ~~Germany~~; ~~Japan~~; ~~Canada~~; **Finland**; Netherlands; Czech Republic; New Zealand

Women

Moguls	Aerials	Ski Cross	Halfpipe	Slopestyle
**South Korea**; Norway; Sweden; Sweden; Norway; Germany; Great Britain; Austria; Spain; China	**Belarus**; **Belarus**; ~~Belarus~~; ~~Brazil~~; **Brazil**	**Russia**; ~~Great Britain~~; ~~Japan~~; **Czech Republic**; ~~Norway~~; **Chile**; ~~Czech Republic~~; ~~Russia~~; ~~Great Britain~~; ~~Japan~~	~~Austria~~; ~~Japan~~; **Germany**; **Russia**; ~~Canada~~; ~~Netherlands~~; ~~Sweden~~; **South Korea**; Austria; New Zealand	**Canada**; **Austria**; Great Britain; Czech Republic; Japan; Italy; Sweden; Germany; Austria; New Zealand
