= China at the 2014 Winter Olympics =

- IOC code: CHN
- NOC: Chinese Olympic Committee
- Website: www.olympic.cn (in Chinese and English)

in Sochi
- Competitors: 66 in 9 sports
- Flag bearers: Tong Jian (opening); Liu Qiuhong (closing)
- Medals Ranked 12th: Gold 3 Silver 4 Bronze 2 Total 9

Winter Olympics appearances (overview)
- 1980; 1984; 1988; 1992; 1994; 1998; 2002; 2006; 2010; 2014; 2018; 2022; 2026

China competed at the 2014 Winter Olympics in Sochi, Russia, from 7–23 February 2014.

The 2014 Games marked the first time a Chinese Olympic team competed in Russia, as China and 64 western countries did not take part at the American-led boycott in the 1980 Summer Olympics held in Moscow due to the Soviet–Afghan War.

== Medalists ==
Medal	Name	Sport	Event	Date
Gold	Li Jianrou	Short track speed skating	Women's 500 metres	13 February
Gold	Zhang Hong	Speed skating	Women's 1000 metres	13 February
Gold	Zhou Yang	Short track speed skating	Women's 1500 metres	15 February
Silver	Han Tianyu	Short track speed skating	Men's 1500 metres	10 February
Silver	Xu Mengtao	Freestyle skiing	Women's aerials	14 February
Silver	Fan Kexin	Short track speed skating	Women's 1000 metres	21 February
Silver	Wu Dajing	Short track speed skating	Men's 500 metres	21 February
Bronze	Jia Zongyang	Freestyle skiing	Men's aerials	17 February
Bronze	Wu Dajing; Chen Dequan; Han Tianyu; Shi Jingnan	Short track speed skating	Men's 5000 metre relay	21 February

Medals by sport
Sport	1st place, gold medalist(s)	2nd place, silver medalist(s)	3rd place, bronze medalist(s)	Total
Freestyle skiing	0	1	1	2
Speed skating	1	0	0	1
Short Track Speed Skating	2	3	1	6
Total	3	4	2	9

== Alpine skiing ==
According to the quota allocation released on January 20, 2014, China had two athletes in qualification position.

Athlete	Event	Run 1		Run 2		Total	
Athlete	Event	Time	Rank	Time	Rank	Time	Rank
Zhang Yuxin	Men's giant slalom	1:38.45	74	DSQ			
Zhang Yuxin	Men's slalom	DNF					
Xia Lina	Women's giant slalom	1:37.03	73	1:38.59	66	3:15.62	66
Xia Lina	Women's slalom	DNF					

== Biathlon ==
Based on their performance at the 2012 and 2013 Biathlon World Championships, China qualified 1 man and 4 women.

Athlete	Event	Time	Misses	Rank
Ren Long	Men's sprint	28:53.2	4 (0+4)	83
Ren Long	Men's individual	56:35.8	4 (1+2+0+1)	66
Song Chaoqing	Women's sprint	23:49.5	1 (1+0)	63
Song Na	Women's sprint	27:01.5	4 (3+1)	83
Song Na	Women's individual	59:43.3	6 (0+2+2+2)	77
Tang Jialin	Women's sprint	23:26.7	2 (0+2)	55
Tang Jialin	Women's pursuit	34:40.4	2 (0+1+0+1)	50
Tang Jialin	Women's individual	51:03.7	3 (0+1+0+2)	57
Zhang Yan	Women's sprint	23:09.4	0 (0+0)	49
Zhang Yan	Women's pursuit	36:12.1	2 (0+2+0+0)	53
Zhang Yan	Women's individual	49:57.0	0 (0+0+0+0)	46
Song Chaoqing; Zhang Yan; Tang Jialin; Song Na	Women's team relay	LAP	11 (0+11)	15

== Cross-country skiing ==
According to the quota allocation released on January 20, 2014, China had qualified a total quota of four athletes.

Distance

Athlete	Event	Classical		Freestyle		Final		
Athlete	Event	Time	Rank	Time	Rank	Time	Deficit	Rank
Xu Wenlong	Men's 15 km classical	—N/a				45:28.2	+6:58.5	72
Xu Wenlong	Men's 30 km skiathlon	39:57.9	60	36:21.0	58	1:16:53.3	+8:37.9	59
Xu Wenlong	Men's 50 km freestyle	—N/a				2:08:02.0	+21:06.8	60
Man Dandan	Women's 10 km classical	—N/a				32:25.1	+4:07.3	53
Li Hongxue	Women's 10 km classical	—N/a				31:20.7	+3:02.9	34
Li Hongxue	Women's 15 km skiathlon	21:21.0	52	21:12.5	46	43:17.7	+4:44.1	50
Li Hongxue	Women's 30 km freestyle	—N/a				1:14:01.5	+2:56.3	22

Sprint

Athlete	Event	Qualification		Quarterfinal		Semifinal		Final	
Athlete	Event	Time	Rank	Time	Rank	Time	Rank	Time	Rank
Sun Qinghai	Men's sprint	3:37.71	26 Q	3:47.26	6	Did not advance			
Xu Wenlong	Men's sprint	DNF		Did not advance					
Sun Qinghai; Xu Wenlong	Men's team sprint	—N/a				DNS		Did not advance	
Li Hongxue	Women's sprint	2:48.72	51	Did not advance					
Man Dandan	Women's sprint	2:40.29	32	Did not advance					
Li Hongxue; Man Dandan	Women's team sprint	—N/a				17:40.90	8	Did not advance	

== Curling ==
Based on results from the 2012 World Men's Curling Championship and the 2013 World Men's Curling Championship, China had qualified their men's team as one of the seven highest ranked nations. The Women's team managed to qualify by winning the last chance qualifying event in December 2013. The men's team consisted of Liu Rui, Xu Xiaoming, Ba Dexin, Zang Jialiang, and Zou Dejia. The women's team consisted of the defending bronze medalists Wang Bingyu, Liu Yin, Yue Qingshuang, Zhou Yan, and new alternate Jiang Yilun.

=== Men's tournament ===
Final round robin standings
Team	Skip	Pld	W	L	PF	PA	EW	EL	BE	SE	S%	Qualification
Sweden	Niklas Edin	9	8	1	60	44	38	30	18	8	86%	Playoffs
Canada	Brad Jacobs	9	7	2	69	53	39	36	14	7	84%	Playoffs
China	Liu Rui	9	7	2	67	50	41	37	11	5	85%	Playoffs
Norway	Thomas Ulsrud	9	5	4	52	53	36	33	18	5	86%	Tiebreaker
Great Britain	David Murdoch	9	5	4	51	49	37	35	15	8	83%	Tiebreaker
Denmark	Rasmus Stjerne	9	4	5	54	61	32	37	17	4	81%	
Russia	Andrey Drozdov	9	3	6	58	70	36	38	13	7	77%	
Switzerland	Sven Michel	9	3	6	47	46	31	34	22	7	83%	
United States	John Shuster	9	2	7	47	58	30	39	14	7	80%	
Germany	John Jahr	9	1	8	53	74	38	39	10	9	76%	

Round-robin

China had a bye in draws 2, 6, and 10.

Draw 1

Monday, February 10, 9:00 am

Sheet C	1	2	3	4	5	6	7	8	9	10	Final
Denmark (Stjerne)	0	0	0	0	1	0	1	0	2	0	4
China (Liu) 🔨	0	2	1	0	0	0	0	3	0	1	7

Draw 3

Tuesday, February 11, 2:00 pm

Sheet B	1	2	3	4	5	6	7	8	9	10	Final
United States (Shuster)	0	1	0	2	0	1	0	0	X	X	4
China (Liu) 🔨	1	0	3	0	2	0	1	2	X	X	9

Draw 4

Wednesday, February 12, 9:00 am

Sheet D	1	2	3	4	5	6	7	8	9	10	Final
China (Liu) 🔨	0	2	0	1	0	0	0	1	0	1	5
Switzerland (Michel)	0	0	2	0	1	0	0	0	1	0	4

Draw 5

Wednesday, February 12, 7:00 pm

Sheet A	1	2	3	4	5	6	7	8	9	10	Final
Germany (Jahr)	0	1	0	2	0	2	1	0	1	0	7
China (Liu) 🔨	2	0	3	0	2	0	0	1	0	3	11

Draw 7

Friday, February 14, 9:00 am

Sheet B	1	2	3	4	5	6	7	8	9	10	11	Final
Sweden (Edin)	0	0	1	0	1	0	1	2	0	0	1	6
China (Liu) 🔨	0	2	0	1	0	1	0	0	0	1	0	5

Draw 8

Friday, February 14, 7:00 pm

Sheet C	1	2	3	4	5	6	7	8	9	10	Final
China (Liu) 🔨	1	0	0	2	0	2	0	1	0	1	7
Norway (Ulsrud)	0	0	2	0	1	0	1	0	1	0	5

Draw 9

Saturday, February 15, 2:00 pm

Sheet D	1	2	3	4	5	6	7	8	9	10	Final
Russia (Drozdov)	0	0	2	0	1	0	1	0	2	X	6
China (Liu) 🔨	2	1	0	2	0	2	0	2	0	X	9

Draw 11

Sunday, February 16, 7:00 pm

Sheet B	1	2	3	4	5	6	7	8	9	10	11	Final
China (Liu)	0	0	2	0	3	1	0	0	0	2	0	8
Canada (Jacobs) 🔨	0	2	0	1	0	0	2	1	2	0	1	9

Draw 12

Monday, February 17, 2:00 pm

Sheet A	1	2	3	4	5	6	7	8	9	10	Final
China (Liu) 🔨	1	0	0	2	0	0	1	1	0	1	6
Great Britain (Murdoch)	0	1	1	0	0	1	0	0	2	0	5

=== Women's tournament ===
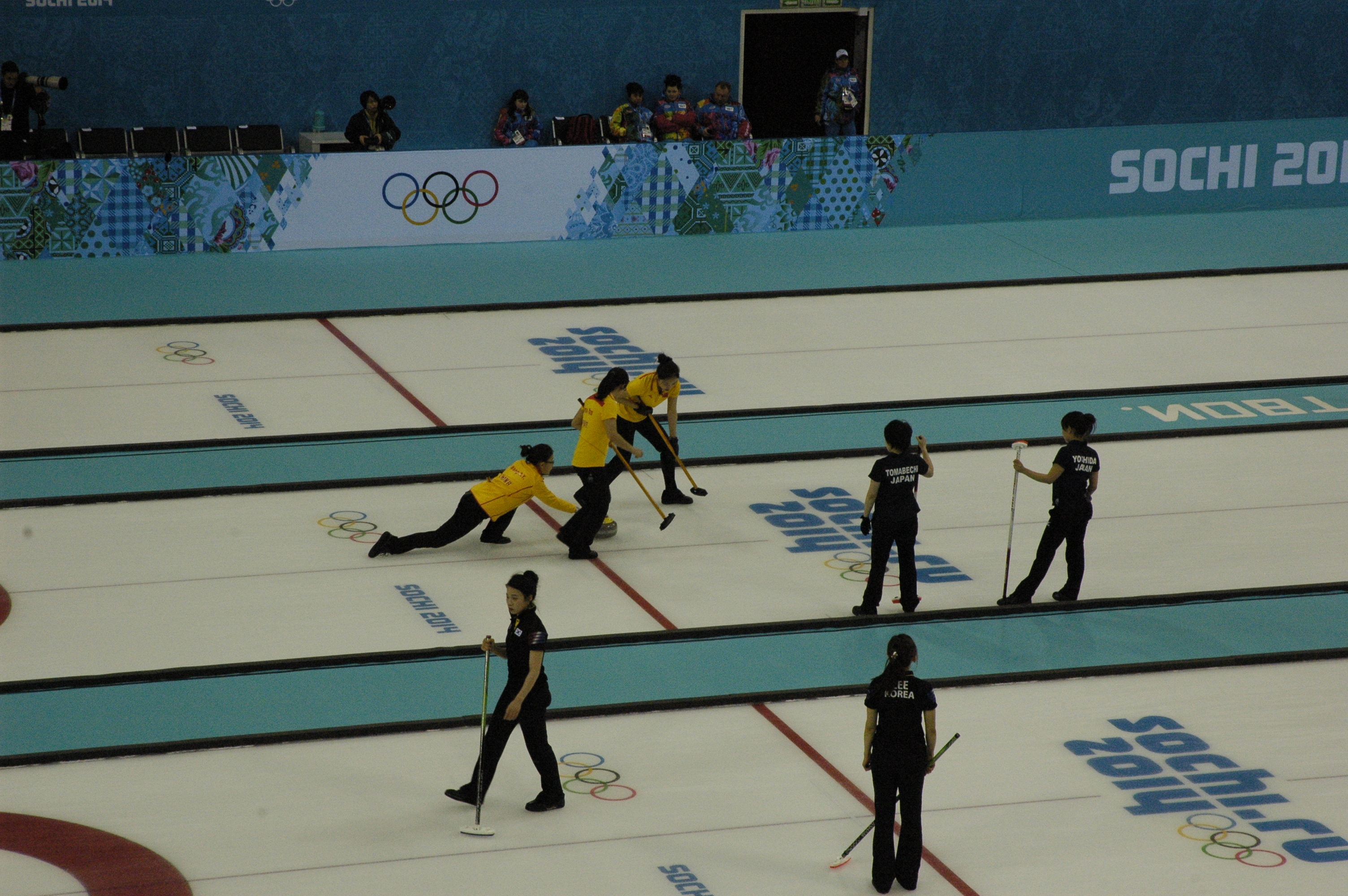
Chinese women's curling team (in yellow)

Final round robin standings
Team	Skip	Pld	W	L	PF	PA	EW	EL	BE	SE	S%	Qualification
Canada	Jennifer Jones	9	9	0	72	40	43	27	12	14	86%	Playoffs
Sweden	Margaretha Sigfridsson	9	7	2	58	52	37	35	13	7	80%	Playoffs
Switzerland	Mirjam Ott	9	5	4	63	60	37	38	13	7	78%	Playoffs
Great Britain	Eve Muirhead	9	5	4	74	58	39	35	9	11	80%	Playoffs
Japan	Ayumi Ogasawara	9	4	5	59	67	39	41	4	10	76%	
Denmark	Lene Nielsen	9	4	5	57	56	34	40	12	9	78%	
China	Wang Bingyu	9	4	5	58	62	36	38	10	4	81%	
South Korea	Kim Ji-sun	9	3	6	60	65	35	37	10	6	79%	
Russia	Anna Sidorova	9	3	6	48	56	33	35	19	6	82%	
United States	Erika Brown	9	1	8	42	75	33	40	8	5	76%	

Round-robin

China had a bye in draws 2, 6, and 10.

Draw 1

Monday, February 10, 2:00 pm

Sheet A	1	2	3	4	5	6	7	8	9	10	Final
China (Wang)	0	0	0	1	0	1	0	X	X	X	2
Canada (Jones) 🔨	0	2	1	0	3	0	3	X	X	X	9

Draw 3

Tuesday, February 11, 7:00 pm

Sheet D	1	2	3	4	5	6	7	8	9	10	Final
China (Wang) 🔨	0	0	1	0	0	2	0	3	0	1	7
Russia (Sidorova)	0	2	0	1	0	0	1	0	1	0	5

Draw 4

Wednesday, February 12, 2:00 pm

Sheet B	1	2	3	4	5	6	7	8	9	10	Final
United States (Brown)	1	0	1	0	0	1	0	0	1	0	4
China (Wang) 🔨	0	1	0	0	2	0	0	2	0	2	7

Draw 5

Thursday, February 13, 9:00 am

Sheet C	1	2	3	4	5	6	7	8	9	10	Final
China (Wang) 🔨	2	0	1	0	1	0	1	0	2	0	7
Great Britain (Muirhead)	0	2	0	2	0	2	0	1	0	1	8

Draw 7

Friday, February 14, 2:00 pm

Sheet A	1	2	3	4	5	6	7	8	9	10	Final
South Korea (Kim)	0	0	2	0	0	1	0	0	X	X	3
China (Wang) 🔨	0	3	0	0	3	0	3	2	X	X	11

Draw 8

Saturday, February 15, 9:00 am

Sheet B	1	2	3	4	5	6	7	8	9	10	Final
China (Wang)🔨	0	2	1	0	0	2	0	1	0	1	7
Sweden (Sigfridsson)	0	0	0	1	1	0	2	0	2	0	6

Draw 9

Saturday, February 15, 7:00 pm

Sheet D	1	2	3	4	5	6	7	8	9	10	Final
Denmark (Nielsen)	0	2	0	1	2	0	0	0	3	1	9
China (Wang) 🔨	2	0	2	0	0	1	0	1	0	0	6

Draw 11

Monday, February 17, 9:00 am

Sheet C	1	2	3	4	5	6	7	8	9	10	Final
Japan (Ogasawara) 🔨	2	0	1	0	2	0	1	0	2	X	8
China (Wang)	0	2	0	1	0	1	0	1	0	X	5

Draw 12

Monday, February 17, 7:00 pm

Sheet A	1	2	3	4	5	6	7	8	9	10	Final
China (Wang)	0	0	2	1	0	1	0	0	2	0	6
Switzerland (Ott) 🔨	1	3	0	0	2	0	0	3	0	1	10

== Figure skating ==
China had achieved the following quota places: The team consisted of eight athletes. The team had also qualified for the team trophy.

Athlete	Event	SP/OD		FS/FD		Total	
Athlete	Event	Points	Rank	Points	Rank	Points	Rank
Yan Han	Men's singles	85.66	8 Q	160.54	7	246.20	7
Li Zijun	Ladies' singles	57.55	11 Q	110.75	14	166.55	14
Zhang Kexin	Ladies' singles	55.80	14 Q	98.41	15	154.21	15
Pang Qing / Tong Jian	Pairs	73.30	4 Q	136.58	3	209.88	4
Zhang Hao / Peng Cheng	Pairs	70.59	7 Q	125.13	8	195.72	8
Huang Xintong / Zheng Xun	Ice dancing	48.96	23	Did not advance			

Team trophy

Athlete	Event	Short program/Short dance						Free skate/Free dance					
Athlete	Event	Men's	Ladies'	Pairs	Ice dance	Total		Men's	Ladies'	Pairs	Ice dance	Total	
Athlete	Event	Points Team points	Points Team points	Points Team points	Points Team points	Points	Rank	Points Team points	Points Team points	Points Team points	Points Team points	Points	Rank
Yan Han (M); Zhang Kexin (L); Zhang Hao / Peng Cheng (P); Huang Xintong / Zheng Xun (D)	Team trophy	85.52; 7	54.58; 4	71.01; 8	47.88; 1	20	7	Did not advance					

== Freestyle skiing ==
China had qualified nine quota spots for the following events. The full list of Chinese freestyle skiing team was officially announced on January 26, 2014.

Aerials

Athlete	Event	Qualification				Final					
Athlete	Event	Jump 1		Jump 2		Jump 1		Jump 2		Jump 3	
Athlete	Event	Points	Rank	Points	Rank	Points	Rank	Points	Rank	Points	Rank
Jia Zongyang	Men's aerials	118.59	1 Q	BYE		110.41	4 Q	117.70	1 Q	95.06	3rd place, bronze medalist(s)
Liu Zhongqing	Men's aerials	80.09	18	77.83	15	did not advance					
Qi Guangpu	Men's aerials	113.57	4 Q	BYE		121.24	1 Q	116.74	2 Q	90.00	4
Wu Chao	Men's aerials	110.62	5 Q	BYE		82.30	9	did not advance			
Cheng Shuang	Women's aerials	83.19	4 Q	BYE		80.01	7 Q	87.42	5	Did not advance	
Li Nina	Women's aerials	86.71	2 Q	BYE		90.24	4 Q	89.53	3 Q	46.02	4
Xu Mengtao	Women's aerials	71.44	11	87.15	2 Q	90.65	3 Q	101.08	1 Q	83.50	2nd place, silver medalist(s)
Zhang Xin	Women's aerials	60.98	17	77.49	7	Did not advance					

Moguls

Athlete	Event	Qualification								Final											
Athlete	Event	Run 1				Run 2				Run 1				Run 2				Run 3			
Athlete	Event	Time	Points	Total	Rank	Time	Points	Total	Rank	Time	Points	Total	Rank	Time	Points	Total	Rank	Time	Points	Total	Rank
Ning Qin	Women's moguls	32.10	11.62	16.83	21	31.6	12.34	17.75	9 Q	32.04	12.03	17.26	18	Did not advance							

== Short track speed skating ==
China qualified five skaters of each gender for the Olympics during World Cup 3 & 4 in November 2013. They qualified the maximum number of starting places with 3 for each gender in each distance (500m, 1000m, & 1500m) and both a men's and women's relay team.

China was hot favorites to win most of the gold medals from the women in the short-track speed skating, including in the 500m, 1000m, & 3000m women's relay. However reigning three-time Olympic gold medalist from Vancouver Wang Meng, broke her ankle during a crash during ice training on January 15, 2014, and did not compete in the Olympics. This was a big blow to the medal chances for China, and had an emotional impact on the team with only a month remaining before Sochi. China was handed another blow with a disqualification from the women's 3000m relay final at Sochi, after impeding on the last lap, giving arch rival Korea the gold medal. Korea was handed the same disqualification in Vancouver that gave China the gold medal four years earlier. Fan Kexin was set to win the 500m after Wang Meng's injury. However, again fell during the semi's. However, China picked up surprise wins in the 500m from Li Jianrou, and 1500m from Zhou Yang. The men also came away with un-predicted medals.

Men

Athlete	Event	Heat		Quarterfinal		Semifinal		Final	
Athlete	Event	Time	Rank	Time	Rank	Time	Rank	Time	Rank
Chen Dequan	1500 m	2:16.535	3 Q	—N/a		2:21.697	2 FA	2:15.626	5
Han Tianyu	500 m	41.592	1 Q	41.390	1 Q	41.151	3 FB	41.534	5
Han Tianyu	1000 m	1:26.530	2 Q	1:24.490	2 Q	1:24.611	4 FB	1:29.334	5
Han Tianyu	1500 m	2:20.911	2 Q	—N/a		2:15.858	1 Q	2:15.055	2nd place, silver medalist(s)
Liang Wenhao	500 m	41.647	1 Q	41.817	1 Q	41.221	2 FA	1:13.590	4
Liang Wenhao	1000 m	1:28.065	4	Did not advance					28
Shi Jingnan	1500 m	2:51.512	6	—N/a		Did not advance			35
Wu Dajing	500 m	41.712	1 Q	41.056	1 Q	40.846	1 FA	41.516	2nd place, silver medalist(s)
Wu Dajing	1000 m	1:24.950	1 Q	1:24.753	1 Q	1:24.239	2 FA	1:25.772	4
Chen Dequan; Han Tianyu; Liang Wenhao; Shi Jingnan; Wu Dajing	5000 m relay	—N/a				6:44.521	2 FA	6:48.341	3rd place, bronze medalist(s)

Women

Athlete	Event	Heat		Quarterfinal		Semifinal		Final	
Athlete	Event	Time	Rank	Time	Rank	Time	Rank	Time	Rank
Fan Kexin	500 m	43.356	1 Q	43.288	1 Q	1:24.431	4 FB	44.297	5
Fan Kexin	1000 m	1:31.713	2 Q	1:29.380	2 Q	1:32.618	2 FA	1:30.811	2nd place, silver medalist(s)
Li Jianrou	500 m	43.633	2 Q	43.486	2 Q	43.841	2 FA	45.263	1st place, gold medalist(s)
Li Jianrou	1000 m	1:31.187	1 Q	1:32.129	2 Q	PEN		Did not advance	
Li Jianrou	1500 m	2:27.758	3 Q	—N/a		2:22.866	1 FA	DNF	12
Liu Qiuhong	500 m	43.542	1 Q	43.478	1 Q	43.916	3 FB	44.188	4
Liu Qiuhong	1000 m	PEN		did not advance					
Liu Qiuhong	1500 m	2:24.640	4	—N/a		Did not advance			
Zhou Yang	1500 m	2:26.543	1 Q	—N/a		2:18.825	1 FA	2:19.140	1st place, gold medalist(s)
Fan Kexin; Kong Xue; Li Jianrou; Liu Qiuhong; Zhou Yang	3000 m relay	—N/a				4:09.555	1 FA	PEN	5

Qualification legend: ADV – Advanced due to being impeded by another skater; FA – Qualify to medal round; FB – Qualify to consolation round

== Snowboarding ==
Freestyle

Athlete	Event	Qualification				Semifinal				Final			
Athlete	Event	Run 1	Run 2	Best	Rank	Run 1	Run 2	Best	Rank	Run 1	Run 2	Best	Rank
Shi Wancheng	Men's halfpipe	76.00	15.50	76.00	6 QS	15.50	78.50	78.50	5 Q	81.00	25.00	81.00	7
Zhang Yiwei	Men's halfpipe	90.00	89.75	90.00	4 QS	45.00	79.25	79.25	4 Q	87.25	58.50	87.25	6
Cai Xuetong	Women's halfpipe	74.25	88.00	88.00	3 QF	BYE				84.25	25.00	84.25	6
Li Shuang	Women's halfpipe	77.75	54.00	77.75	4 QS	80.00	56.75	80.00	3 Q	73.25	23.75	73.25	8
Liu Jiayu	Women's halfpipe	81.50	83.50	83.50	5 QS	81.25	29.00	81.25	2 Q	15.75	68.25	68.25	9
Sun Zhifeng	Women's halfpipe	70.00	45.75	70.00	6 QS	35.75	35.75	35.75	9	Did not advance			

Qualification Legend: QF – Qualify directly to final; QS – Qualify to semifinal

== Speed skating ==
Based on the results from the fall World Cups during the 2013–14 ISU Speed Skating World Cup season, China had earned the following start quotas:

2014 World Sprint Speed Skating Champion Yu Jing missed the Games due to reoccurrence of an old waist injury. Jing was selected to ride the women's 500 m. Deputy Secretary General of the delegation was studying who was going to replace her.

Men

Athlete	Event	Race 1		Race 2		Final	
Athlete	Event	Time	Rank	Time	Rank	Time	Rank
Bai Qiuming	500 m	35.73	36	35.71	36	71.45	35
Mu Zhongsheng	500 m	35.59	31	35.65	32	71.25	30
Tian Guojun	1000 m	—N/a				1:11.17	33
Tian Guojun	1500 m	—N/a				1:47.95	21

Women

Athlete	Event	Race 1		Race 2		Final	
Athlete	Event	Time	Rank	Time	Rank	Time	Rank
Li Dan	1000 m	—N/a				1:20.20	34
Li Qishi	1500 m	—N/a				2:00.89	27
Qi Shuai	500 m	38.89	19	38.99	23	77.89	23
Wang Beixing	500 m	37.82	6	37.86	6	75.68	7
Wang Beixing	1000 m	—N/a				1:16.59	14
Zhang Hong	500 m	37.58	3	37.99	7	75.58	4
Zhang Hong	1000 m	—N/a				1:14.02	1st place, gold medalist(s)
Zhang Shuang	500 m	39.40	31	39.25	28	78.65	31
Zhao Xin	1500 m	—N/a				2:00.27	23

== See also ==
- China at the 2014 Summer Youth Olympics
- China at the 2014 Winter Paralympics
