= List of flag bearers for China at the Olympics =

China at the Olympics
- IOC code: CHN
- NOC: Chinese Olympic Committee
- Website: www.olympic.cn (in Chinese and English)
- Medals: Gold 325 Silver 258 Bronze 221 Total 804

Summer appearances
- 1952; 1956–1980; 1984; 1988; 1992; 1996; 2000; 2004; 2008; 2012; 2016; 2020; 2024

Winter appearances
- 1980; 1984; 1988; 1992; 1994; 1998; 2002; 2006; 2010; 2014; 2018; 2022; 2026

Other related appearances
- Republic of China (1924–1948)

This is a list of flag bearers who have represented China at the Olympics.

Flag bearers carry the national flag of their country at the opening ceremony of the Olympic Games.

#	Event year	Season	National flag	Flag bearer	Sport
1	1932	Summer	(Taiwan)	Liu Changchun	Athletics
2	1936	Summer	(Taiwan)	Lee Wai Tong	Football
3	1948	Summer	(Taiwan)	Wee Tian Siak	Basketball
4	1980	Winter	(China)	Zhao Weichang	Speed skating
5	1984	Winter	(China)	Zhao Shijian	Speed skating
6	1984	Summer	(China)	Wang Libin	Basketball
7	1988	Winter	(China)	Zhang Shubin	Figure skating
8	1988	Summer	(China)	Song Tao	Basketball
9	1992	Winter	(China)	Song Chen	Speed skating
10	1992	Summer	(China)	Song Ligang	Basketball
11	1994	Winter	(China)	Liu Yanfei	Speed skating
12	1996	Summer	(China)	Liu Yudong	Basketball
13	1998	Winter	(China)	Zhao Hongbo	Figure skating
14	2000	Summer	(China)	Liu Yudong	Basketball
15	2002	Winter	(China)	Zhang Min	Figure skating
16	2004	Summer	(China)	Yao Ming	Basketball
17	2006	Winter	(China)	Yang Yang (A)	Short track speed skating
18	2008	Summer	(China)	Yao Ming	Basketball
19	2010	Winter	(China)	Han Xiaopeng	Freestyle skiing
20	2012	Summer	(China)	Yi Jianlian	Basketball
21	2014	Winter	(China)	Tong Jian	Figure skating
22	2016	Summer	(China)	Lei Sheng	Fencing
23	2018	Winter	(China)	Zhou Yang	Short track speed skating
24	2020	Summer	(China)	Zhao Shuai	Taekwondo
25	2020	Summer	(China)	Zhu Ting	Volleyball
26	2022	Winter	(China)	Zhao Dan	Skeleton
27	2022	Winter	(China)	Gao Tingyu	Speed skating
28	2024	Summer	(China)	Ma Long	Table tennis
29	2024	Summer	(China)	Feng Yu	Artistic swimming
30	2026	Winter	(China)	Ning Zhongyan	Speed skating
31	2026	Winter	(China)	Zhang Chutong	Short-track speed skating

== See also ==
- China at the Olympics
