= 2012–13 FIS Freestyle Skiing World Cup =

Freestyle skiing competitive season

Freestyle Skiing World Cup 2012/13
Discipline	Men	Women
Overall	(Canada) Mikaël Kingsbury	(China) Mengtao Xu
Moguls	(Canada) Mikaël Kingsbury	(United States) Hannah Kearney
Aerials	(China) Zongyang Jia	(China) Mengtao Xu
Ski Cross	(Switzerland) Alex Fiva	(Switzerland) Fanny Smith
Halfpipe	(Canada) Mike Riddle	(Switzerland) Virginie Faivre
Slopestyle	(United Kingdom) James Woods	(United States) Keri Herman
- Nations Cup: United States

Competition
Locations	24	24
Individual	38	38
Cancelled	8	8

The 2012/13 FIS Freestyle Skiing World Cup was the thirty fourth World Cup season in freestyle skiing organised by International Ski Federation. The season started on 22 August 2012 and ended on 25 March 2013. This season included five disciplines: moguls, aerials, ski cross, halfpipe and slopestyle.

== Men ==
=== Ski Cross ===
Num	Season	Date	Place	Event	Winner	Second	Third
75	1	8 December 2012	(Canada) Nakiska	SX	(Switzerland) Armin Niederer	(Switzerland) Alex Fiva	(Australia) Anton Grimus
76	2	13 December 2012	(United States) Telluride	SX	(Slovenia) Filip Flisar	(Canada) Brady Leman	(Switzerland) Armin Niederer
77	3	19 December 2012	(France) Val Thorens	SX	(Switzerland) Armin Niederer	(Canada) Brady Leman	(United States) Joe Swensson
78	4	23 December 2012	(Italy) Innichen	SX	(Switzerland) Alex Fiva	(Germany) Daniel Bohnacker	(Sweden) Victor Norberg Öhling
79	5	12 January 2013	(France) Les Contamines	SX	(Switzerland) Alex Fiva	(Slovenia) Filip Flisar	(Czech Republic) Tomáš Kraus
80	6	15 January 2013	(France) Megève	SX	(United States) John Teller	(Finland) Jouni Pellinen	(Switzerland) Armin Niederer
		2 February 2013	(Germany) Grasgehren	SX	rain		
81	7	3 February 2013	(Germany) Grasgehren	SX	(Czech Republic) Tomáš Kraus	(Canada) Tristan Tafel	(Sweden) Victor Öhling Norberg
82	8	19 February 2013	(Russia) Sochi	SX	(Sweden) Victor Öhling Norberg	(Canada) Christopher Del Bosco	(Germany) Andreas Schauer
		24 February 2013	(Czech Republic) Harrachov	SX	rescheduled to Spindleruv Mlyn		
		24 February 2013 (Note: Ski cross event for men cancelled in Harrachov on 24 February 2013 was planned to be rescheduled in Spindleruv Mlyn also on 24 February 2013, but this was also cancelled.)	(Czech Republic) Spindleruv Mlyn	SX	finally cancelled		
		2 March 2013	(Switzerland) Grindelwald	SX	cancelled		
		3 March 2013	(Switzerland) Grindelwald	SX	replaced in Åre		
83	9	16 March 2013 (Note: Ski cross event for men cancelled in Grindelwald on 3 March 2013 was replaced in Åre on 16 March 2013.)	(Sweden) Åre	SX	(Switzerland) Alex Fiva	(Sweden) Victor Öhling Norberg	(France) Jean-Frédéric Chapuis
84	10	17 March 2013	(Sweden) Åre	SX	(France) Jean-Frédéric Chapuis	(Switzerland) Armin Niederer	(France) Sylvain Miaillier
		24 March 2013	(Spain) Sierra Nevada	SX	cancelled		

=== Moguls ===
Num	Season	Date	Place	Event	Winner	Second	Third
48	1	15 December 2012	(Finland) Ruka	DM	(Canada) Mikaël Kingsbury	(Canada) Alexandre Bilodeau	(United States) Jeremy Cota
49	2	22 December 2012	(Austria) Kreischberg	DM	(United States) Bryon Wilson	(Canada) Alexandre Bilodeau	(Canada) Mikaël Kingsbury
50	3	2 February 2013	(United States) Deer Valley	DM	(Canada) Alexandre Bilodeau	(United States) Patrick Deneen	(United States) Bradley Wilson
51	4	24 February 2013	(Japan) Inawashiro	DM	(United States) Bradley Wilson	(Canada) Alexandre Bilodeau	(United States) Joseph Discoe
52	5	16 March 2013	(Sweden) Åre	DM	(Canada) Alexandre Bilodeau	(Canada) Mikaël Kingsbury	(United States) Bradley Wilson
53	6	22 March 2013	(Spain) Sierra Nevada	DM	(Canada) Alexandre Bilodeau	(United States) Patrick Deneen	(Canada) Simon Pouliot-Cavanagh
294	1	17 January 2013	(United States) Lake Placid	MO	(Canada) Mikaël Kingsbury	(United States) Patrick Deneen	(United States) Dylan Walczyk
295	2	26 January 2013	(Canada) Calgary	MO	(Canada) Mikaël Kingsbury	(Russia) Alexandr Smyshlyaev	(Japan) Sho Endo
296	3	31 January 2013	(United States) Deer Valley	MO	(Canada) Mikaël Kingsbury	(Canada) Alexandre Bilodeau	(United States) Patrick Deneen
297	4	15 February 2013	(Russia) Sochi	MO	(Canada) Mikaël Kingsbury	(United States) Patrick Deneen	(Canada) Philippe Marquis
298	5	23 February 2013	(Japan) Inawashiro	MO	(Canada) Mikaël Kingsbury	(United States) Bradley Wilson	(Canada) Alexandre Bilodeau
299	6	15 March 2013	(Sweden) Åre	MO	(Canada) Alexandre Bilodeau	(United States) Patrick Deneen	(Canada) Mikaël Kingsbury

=== Aerials ===
Num	Season	Date	Place	Event	Winner	Second	Third
293	1	5 January 2013	(China) Changchun	AE	(China) Zongyang Jia	(China) Guangpu Qi	(Canada) Olivier Rochon
294	2	12 January 2013	(Canada) Val Saint Côme	AE	(Belarus) Dmitri Dashinski	(Canada) Travis Gerrits	(China) Hangzhou
295	3	18 January 2013	(United States) Lake Placid	AE	(China) Zongyang Jia	(China) Guangpu Qi	(Australia) David Morris
296	4	19 January 2013	(United States) Lake Placid	AE	(China) Zongyang Jia	(Belarus) Dmitri Dashinski	(Russia) Petr Medulich
297	5	1 February 2013	(United States) Deer Valley	AE	(Belarus) Maxim Gustik	(Canada) Travis Gerrits	(United States) Michael Rossi
298	6	17 February 2013	(Russia) Sochi	AE	(China) Guangpu Qi	(China) Zhongqing Liu	(Belarus) Denis Osipau
299	7	23 February 2013	(Ukraine) Bukovel	AE	(Australia) David Morris	(United States) Dylan Ferguson	(Belarus) Maxim Gustik

=== Halfpipe ===
Num	Season	Date	Place	Event	Winner	Second	Third
18	1	22 August 2012	(New Zealand) Cardrona	HP	(United States) Torin Yater-Wallace	(France) Thomas Krief	(France) Benoit Valentin
		21 December 2012	(United States) Park City	HP	replaced in Park City		
19	2	11 January 2013	(United States) Copper Mountain	HP	(Canada) Mike Riddle	(United States) Aaron Blunck	(United States) David Wise
20	3	2 February 2013 (Note: Halfpipe event for men cancelled in Park City on 21 December 2012 was replaced later also in Park City on 2 February 2013.)	(United States) Park City	HP	(United States) David Wise	(United States) Torin Yater-Wallace	(France) Kevin Rolland
21	4	16 February 2013	(Russia) Sochi	HP	(United States) Torin Yater-Wallace	(United States) Gus Kenworthy	(Canada) Mike Riddle
22	5	25 March 2013	(Spain) Sierra Nevada	HP	(Canada) Mike Riddle	(Finland) Antti-Jussi Kemppainen	(Canada) Noah Bowman

=== Slopestyle ===
Num	Season	Date	Place	Event	Winner	Second	Third
3	1	7 September 2012	(Argentina) Ushuaia	SS	(United Kingdom) James Woods	(Sweden) Henrik Harlaut	(Switzerland) Jonas Hunziker
4	2	12 January 2013	(United States) Copper Mountain	SS	(United Kingdom) James Woods	(Australia) Russ Henshaw	(Canada) Alex Beaulieu-Marchand
5	3	8 February 2013	(Switzerland) Silvaplana	SS	(Norway) Johan Berg	(Norway) Klaus Finne	(Switzerland) Fabian Bösch
		13 February 2013	(Russia) Sochi	SS	cancelled		
6	4	23 March 2013	(Spain) Sierra Nevada	SS	(United States) Lyman Currier	(Sweden) Oscar Wester	(Norway) Felix Stridsberg-Usterug

== Ladies ==
=== Ski Cross ===
Num	Season	Date	Place	Event	Winner	Second	Third
76	1	8 December 2012	(Canada) Nakiska	SX	(Switzerland) Fanny Smith	(France) Ophélie David	(Sweden) Anna Holmlund
77	2	13 December 2012	(United States) Telluride	SX	(Switzerland) Fanny Smith	(France) Ophélie David	(Sweden) Anna Holmlund
78	3	19 December 2012	(France) Val Thorens	SX	(Switzerland) Fanny Smith	(Norway) Marte Høie Gjefsen	(Austria) Andrea Limbacher
79	4	23 December 2012	(Italy) Innichen	SX	(Canada) Kelsey Serwa	(Canada) Georgia Simmerling	(Switzerland) Katrin Müller
80	5	12 January 2013	(France) Les Contamines	SX	(Austria) Andrea Limbacher	(Sweden) Anna Holmlund	(Switzerland) Fanny Smith
81	6	15 January 2013	(France) Megève	SX	(Germany) Anna Wörner	(Canada) Kelsey Serwa	(France) Ophélie David
		2 February 2013	(Germany) Grasgehren	SX	rain		
82	7	3 February 2013	(Germany) Grasgehren	SX	(France) Ophélie David	(Germany) Christina Manhard	(France) Marielle Berger Sabbatel
83	8	19 February 2013	(Russia) Sochi	SX	(Canada) Kelsey Serwa	(Canada) Marielle Thompson	(Switzerland) Fanny Smith
		24 February 2013	(Czech Republic) Harrachov	SX	rescheduled to Spindleruv Mlyn		
		24 February 2013 (Note: Ski cross event for ladies cancelled in Harrachov on 24 February 2013 was planned to be rescheduled in Spindleruv Mlyn also on 24 February 2013, but this was also cancelled.)	(Czech Republic) Spindleruv Mlyn	SX	finally cancelled		
		2 March 2013	(Switzerland) Grindelwald	SX	cancelled		
		3 March 2013	(Switzerland) Grindelwald	SX	replaced in Åre		
84	9	16 March 2013 (Note: Ski cross event for men cancelled in Grindelwald on 3 March 2013 was replaced in Åre on 16 March 2013.)	(Sweden) Åre	SX	(Germany) Anna Wörner	(France) Marielle Berger Sabbatel	(Poland) Karolina Riemen
85	10	17 March 2013	(Sweden) Åre	SX	(Switzerland) Fanny Smith	(Canada) Marielle Thompson	(Switzerland) Katrin Müller
		24 March 2013	(Spain) Sierra Nevada	SX	cancelled		

=== Moguls ===
Num	Season	Date	Place	Event	Winner	Second	Third
47	1	15 December 2012	(Finland) Ruka	DM	(United States) Heather McPhie	(Canada) Justine Dufour-Lapointe	(Japan) Aiko Uemura
48	2	22 December 2012	(Austria) Kreischberg	DM	(United States) Heather McPhie	(United States) Heidi Kloser	(Canada) Justine Dufour-Lapointe
49	3	2 February 2013	(United States) Deer Valley	DM	(United States) Hannah Kearney	(Canada) Justine Dufour-Lapointe	(Kazakhstan) Yulia Galysheva
50	4	24 February 2013	(Japan) Inawashiro	DM	(Japan) Miki Ito	(United States) Mikaela Matthews	(United States) Hannah Kearney
51	5	16 March 2013	(Sweden) Åre	DM	(United States) Hannah Kearney	(Kazakhstan) Yulia Galysheva	(Canada) Chloé Dufour-Lapointe
52	6	22 March 2013	(Spain) Sierra Nevada	DM	(United States) Hannah Kearney	(Japan) Miki Ito	(United States) Heather McPhie
295	1	17 January 2013	(United States) Lake Placid	MO	(United States) Hannah Kearney	(Czech Republic) Nikola Sudová	(Australia) Britteny Cox
296	2	26 January 2013	(Canada) Calgary	MO	(Canada) Justine Dufour-Lapointe	(Canada) Chloé Dufour-Lapointe	(United States) Eliza Outtrim
297	3	31 January 2013	(United States) Deer Valley	MO	(United States) Hannah Kearney	(United States) Heather McPhie	(United States) Eliza Outtrim
298	4	15 February 2013	(Russia) Sochi	MO	(United States) Hannah Kearney	(United States) Eliza Outtrim	(Japan) Aiko Uemura
299	5	23 February 2013	(Japan) Inawashiro	MO	(Canada) Audrey Robichaud	(Czech Republic) Nikola Sudová	(Canada) Chloé Dufour-Lapointe
300	6	15 March 2013	(Sweden) Åre	MO	(United States) Heather McPhie	(United States) Eliza Outtrim	(Kazakhstan) Yulia Galysheva

=== Aerials ===
Num	Season	Date	Place	Event	Winner	Second	Third
296	1	5 January 2013	(China) Changchun	AE	(China) Mengtao Xu	(Australia) Lydia Lassila	(China) Nina Li
297	2	12 January 2013	(Canada) Val Saint Côme	AE	(China) Mengtao Xu	(Australia) Lydia Lassila	(China) Yu Yang
298	3	18 January 2013	(United States) Lake Placid	AE	(China) Mengtao Xu	(China) Yu Yang	(United States) Emily Cook
299	4	19 January 2013	(United States) Lake Placid	AE	(China) Yu Yang	(Australia) Lydia Lassila	(China) Mengtao Xu
300	5	1 February 2013	(United States) Deer Valley	AE	(China) Mengtao Xu	(Australia) Laura Peel	(China) Xin Zhang
301	6	17 February 2013	(Russia) Sochi	AE	(China) Mengtao Xu	(Australia) Laura Peel	(Switzerland) Tanja Schärer
302	7	23 February 2013	(Ukraine) Bukovel	AE	(United States) Emily Cook	(Ukraine) Nadiya Didenko	(Switzerland) Tanja Schärer

=== Halfpipe ===
Num	Season	Date	Place	Event	Winner	Second	Third
18	1	22 August 2012	(New Zealand) Cardrona	HP	(United States) Devin Logan	(Japan) Manami Mitsuboshi	(Japan) Ayana Onozuka
		21 December 2012	(United States) Park City	HP	replaced in Park City		
19	2	11 January 2013	(United States) Copper Mountain	HP	(United States) Maddie Bowman	(Canada) Rosalind Groenewoud	(United States) Brita Sigourney
20	3	2 February 2013 (Note: Halfpipe event for ladies cancelled in Park City on 21 December 2012 was replaced later also in Park City on 2 February 2013.)	(United States) Park City	HP	(United States) Maddie Bowman	(Japan) Ayana Onozuka	(Switzerland) Virginie Faivre
21	4	16 February 2013	(Russia) Sochi	HP	(Switzerland) Virginie Faivre	(Canada) Rosalind Groenewoud	(Canada) Keltie Hansen
22	5	25 March 2013	(Spain) Sierra Nevada	HP	(Canada) Rosalind Groenewoud	(Switzerland) Virginie Faivre	(Japan) Ayana Onozuka

=== Slopestyle ===
Num	Season	Date	Place	Event	Winner	Second	Third
3	1	7 September 2012	(Argentina) Ushuaia	SS	(United States) Keri Herman	(Switzerland) Eveline Bhend	(Canada) Dara Howell
4	2	12 January 2013	(United States) Copper Mountain	SS	(United States) Keri Herman	(Canada) Dara Howell	(Australia) Anna Segal
5	3	8 February 2013	(Switzerland) Silvaplana	SS	(Norway) Tiril Sjaastad Christiansen	(United Kingdom) Katie Summerhayes	(Australia) Anna Segal
		13 February 2013	(Russia) Sochi	SS	cancelled		
6	4	23 March 2013	(Spain) Sierra Nevada	SS	(United States) Alexi Micinski	(United States) Julia Marino	(New Zealand) Anna Willcox-Silfverberg

== Men's standings ==
=== Overall ===
Rank		Points
1	(Canada) Mikaël Kingsbury	78.33
2	(Canada) Alexandre Bilodeau	74.42
3	(Switzerland) Alex Fiva	61.90
4	(Canada) Mike Riddle	60.00
5	(China) Zongyang Jia	59.14

- Standings after 38 races.

=== Moguls ===
Rank		Points
1	(Canada) Mikaël Kingsbury	940
2	(Canada) Alexandre Bilodeau	893
3	(United States) Patrick Deneen	677
4	(United States) Bradley Wilson	480
5	(Canada) Marc-Antoine Gagnon	368

- Standings after 12 races.

=== Aerials ===
Rank		Points
1	(China) Zongyang Jia	414
2	(Australia) David Morris	332
3	(China) Guangpu Qi	321
4	(United States) Dylan Ferguson	277
5	(Canada) Travis Gerrits	274

- Standings after 7 races.

=== Ski Cross ===
Rank		Points
1	(Switzerland) Alex Fiva	619
2	(Switzerland) Armin Niederer	514
3	(Sweden) Victor Öhling Norberg	414
4	(France) Jean-Frédéric Chapuis	343
5	(Canada) Brady Leman	339

- Standings after 10 races.

=== Halfpipe ===
Rank		Points
1	(Canada) Mike Riddle	300
2	(United States) Torin Yater-Wallace	280
3	(United States) David Wise	205
4	(United States) Aaron Blunck	193
5	(France) Thomas Krief	175

- Standings after 5 races.

=== Slopestyle ===
Rank		Points
1	(United Kingdom) James Woods	226
2	(Norway) Johan Berg	140
3	(Sweden) Oscar Wester	130
4	(Canada) Alex Beaulieu-Marchand	110
5	(United States) Lyman Currier	100

- Standings after 4 races.

== Ladies' standings ==
=== Overall ===
Rank		Points
1	(China) Mengtao Xu	80.00
2	(Switzerland) Virginie Faivre	62.40
3	(Canada) Rosalind Groenewoud	61.00
4	(United States) Hannah Kearney	60.92
5	(Switzerland) Fanny Smith	57.60

- Standings after 38 races.

=== Moguls ===
Rank		Points
1	(United States) Hannah Kearney	731
2	(Canada) Justine Dufour-Lapointe	640
3	(United States) Heather McPhie	627
4	(United States) Eliza Outtrim	535
5	(Canada) Chloé Dufour-Lapointe	492

- Standings after 12 races.

=== Aerials ===
Rank		Points
1	(China) Mengtao Xu	560
2	(United States) Emily Cook	303
3	(Australia) Lydia Lassila	296
4	(Australia) Laura Peel	285
5	(China) Xin Zhang	270

- Standings after 7 races.

=== Ski Cross ===
Rank		Points
1	(Switzerland) Fanny Smith	576
2	(France) Ophélie David	487
3	(France) Marielle Berger Sabbatel	404
4	(Canada) Kelsey Serwa	401
5	(Switzerland) Katrin Müller	344

- Standings after 10 races.

=== Halfpipe ===
Rank		Points
1	(Switzerland) Virginie Faivre	312
2	(Canada) Rosalind Groenewoud	305
3	(Japan) Ayana Onozuka	276
4	(United States) Maddie Bowman	224
5	(Switzerland) Mirjam Jäger	200

- Standings after 5 races.

=== Slopestyle ===
Rank		Points
1	(United States) Keri Herman	200
2	(Norway) Tiril Sjåstad Christiansen	150
3	(Canada) Dara Howell	140
4	(Australia) Anna Segal	120
5	(United States) Alexi Micinski	116

- Standings after 4 races.

== Nations Cup ==
=== Overall ===
Rank		Points
1	United States	1385
2	Canada	1027
3	Switzerland	621
4	France	439
5	Japan	421

- Standings after 76 races.

=== Men ===
Rank		Points
1	United States	712
2	Canada	546
3	Switzerland	308
4	France	257
5	China	168

- Standings after 38 races.

=== Ladies ===
Rank		Points
1	United States	673
2	Canada	481
3	Japan	314
4	Switzerland	313
5	Australia	233

- Standings after 38 races.

== Podium table by nation ==
Table showing the World Cup podium places (gold–1st place, silver–2nd place, bronze–3rd place) by the countries represented by the athletes.

Rank	Nation	Gold	Silver	Bronze	Total
1	United States	23	16	15	54
2	Canada	17	21	14	52
3	Switzerland	10	4	11	25
4	China	10	4	5	19
5	France	2	4	6	12
6	Germany	2	2	1	5
6	Norway	2	2	1	5
8	Belarus	2	1	2	5
9	Great Britain	2	1	0	3
10	Australia	1	6	5	12
11	Sweden	1	4	4	9
12	Japan	1	3	5	9
13	Czech Republic	1	2	1	4
14	Slovenia	1	1	0	2
15	Austria	1	0	1	2
16	Finland	0	2	0	2
17	Kazakhstan	0	1	2	3
18	Russia	0	1	1	2
19	Ukraine	0	1	0	1
20	New Zealand	0	0	1	1
20	Poland	0	0	1	1
Totals (21 entries)		76	76	76	228
