= Baglan Inkarbek =

Kazakhstani freestyle skier (born 1994)

Personal information
- Born: 22 October 1994 (age 31) Shymkent, Kazakhstan

Sport
- Sport: Skiing

Baglan Inkarbek (born 22 October 1994, in Shymkent) is a Kazakhstani freestyle skier, specializing in aerials.

Inkarbek competed at the 2014 Winter Olympics for Kazakhstan. He placed 21st in the first qualifying round in the aerials, not advancing to the final. He subsequently placed 13th in the second qualification round, again failing to advance.

As of April 2014, his best showing at the World Championships is 27th, in the 2013 aerials.

Inkarbek made his World Cup debut in February 2012. As of April 2014, his best World Cup finish is 21st, at Deer Valley in 2012–13. His best World Cup overall finish in aerials is 31st, in 2012–13.
