= Denis Osipau =

Belarusian freestyle skier

Personal information
- Born: 17 July 1983 (age 43) Gomel, Belarusian SSR, Soviet Union

Sport
- Sport: Skiing

World Cup career
- Indiv. podiums: 3

Denis Osipau (born 17 July 1983 in Gomel) is a Belarusian freestyle skier, specializing in aerials.

Osipau competed at the 2014 Winter Olympics for Belarus. He placed 17th in the first qualifying round in the aerials, failing to advance. He subsequently placed 5th in the second qualification round, enough to progress to the final. In the first jump of the three-jump final, he finished 9th, not enough to advance further.

As of April 2014, his best showing at the World Championships is 5th, in the 2011 aerials.

Osipau made his World Cup debut in February 2005. As of April 2014, he has three World Cup podium finishes, with his best performance a silver medal, at Moscow in 2011–12. His best World Cup overall finish in aerials is 8th, in 2012–13.

== World Cup podiums ==
Date	Location	Rank	Event
19 February 2011	Minsk	3rd place, bronze medalist(s)	Aerials
10 March 2012	Moscow	2nd place, silver medalist(s)	Aerials
17 February 2013	Sochi	3rd place, bronze medalist(s)	Aerials
