= Sergey Berestovskiy =

Kazakhstani freestyle skier (born 1986)

Sergei Berestovskiy
Personal information
- Born: January 1, 1986 (age 40) Pavlodar, Kazakh SSR, Soviet Union

Sport
- Sport: Skiing

Sergei Berestovskiy (born January 1, 1986, in Pavlodar) is a Kazakhstani freestyle skier, specializing in aerials.

Berestovskiy competed at the 2014 Winter Olympics for Kazakhstan. He placed 16th in the first qualifying round in the aerials, not advancing to the final. He subsequently placed 11th in the second qualification round, again failing to advance.

As of April 2014, his best showing at the World Championships is 29th, in the 2009 aerials.

Berestovskiy made his World Cup debut in December 2008. As of April 2014, his best World Cup finish is 20th, at Sochi in 2012–13. His best World Cup overall finish in aerials is 29th, in 2012–13.
