= Mac Bohonnon =

American freestyle skier

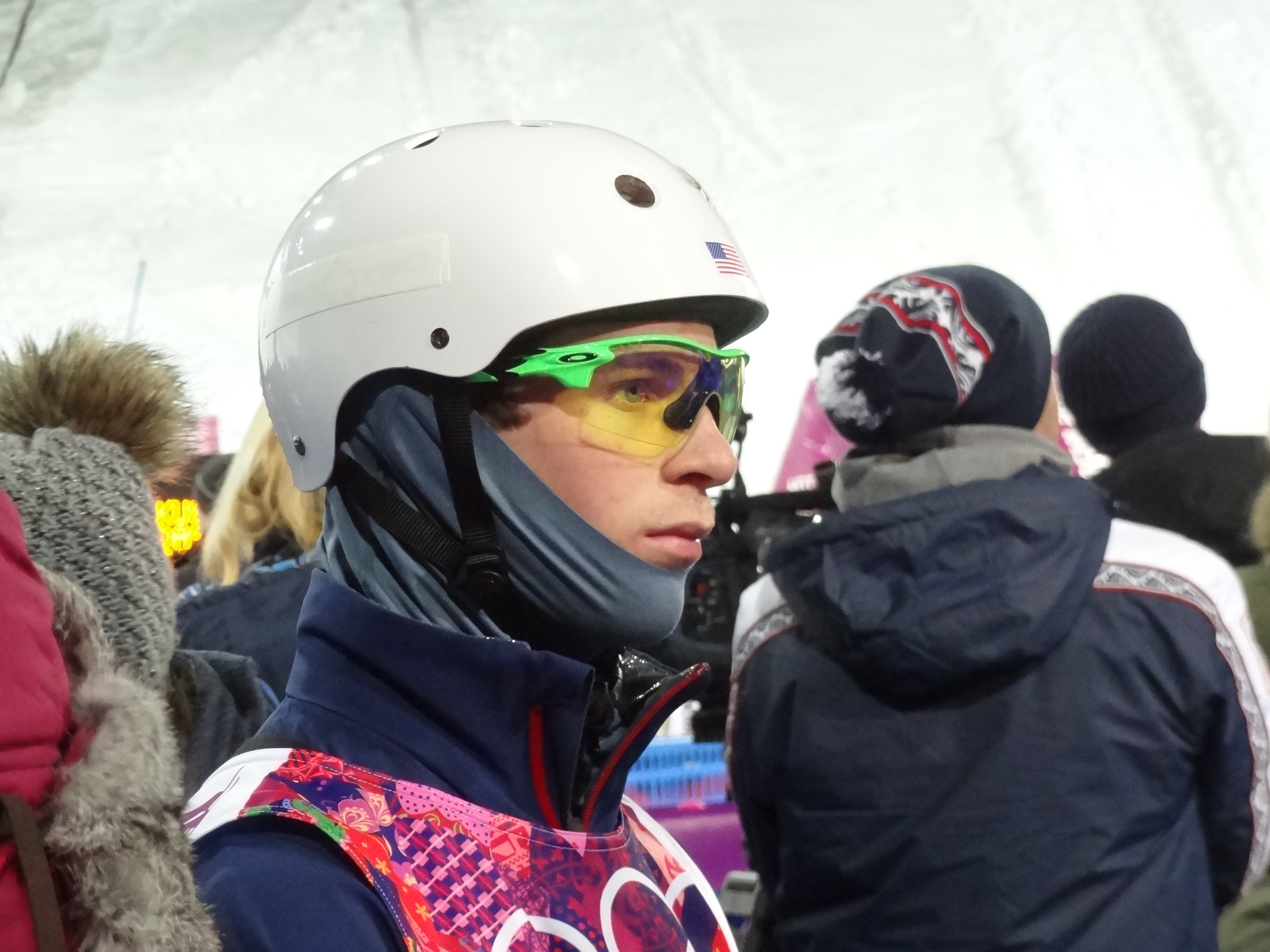

Personal information
- Full name: David McLaren Bohonnon
- Nationality: American
- Citizenship: United States
- Born: March 27, 1995 (age 31) New Haven, Connecticut
- Height: 5 ft 8 in (173 cm)
- Weight: 135 lb (61 kg)
- Other interests: Water skiing, golf, biking
- Website: www.macbohonnon.com

Sport
- Country: United States
- Sport: Freestyle Skiing
- Event: Men's Freestyle Aerials
- Team: USA Ski Team

Achievements and titles
- Olympic finals: Sochi 2014

Mac Bohonnon (born March 27, 1995) is an American freestyle skier originally from Madison, Connecticut. He was named to the United States National Ski Team in 2012. Bohonnon competed at the 2014 Winter Olympics in Sochi, Russia.

== Career ==
At age thirteen, Bohonnon was the youngest athlete to be selected by the U.S. Ski Team's Development Program. In 2012, Mac was named to the U.S. Ski Team. Bohonnon's first Olympic appearance was in Sochi 2014. He placed 5th in men's aerials. Mac considers one of his inspirations to be former U.S. Olympian Eric Bergoust, a 1998 gold medalist. Coincidentally, Bergoust coached Bohonnon for two and a half years at the Olympic Training Center in Lake Placid, NY.

=== Career highlights ===
2011

- 2011 USSA Marriott Junior Championship: Freestyle Junior Nationals in Steamboat Springs, Colorado where he earned a perfect score
- Junior Nationals Competitor 3rd overall
- National Championships Competitor 4th overall
- Nor-Am Tour Competitor

2012

- 3rd Place at US National Championships
- 5th Place at Junior World Championships – Valmalenco, Italy
- 3rd Place in the overall NorAm Grand Prix
- 2nd Place at USSA Marriott Junior National Championships
- 2nd Place at Park City NorAm Day 2 and 3
- 3rd Place at US Selections
- 19th Place at Lake Placid World Cup

2013

- Junior National Champion
- 1st Place at Lake Placid NorAm
- 14th Place at Val St. Come World Cup
- 1st Place at USSA Marriott Junior National Championships

2014

- 2nd Place at Val St. Come World Cup
- Currently 14th in the world
- International Skiing Federation's Rookie of the Year
- 5th Place at Sochi Olympics Men's Freestyle Aerial Qualifying Finals

=== Sochi 2014 ===
At age eighteen, Bohonnon participated in the Olympic Games for the first time. He was not even being considered for the Sochi Olympics until late January when he placed second at the Quebec world qualifying event. He was the first alternate on the U.S. Ski Team in a World Cup event in Val Saint-Côme, Quebec, and was called up to the event when a teammate was injured and could no longer compete. He was told he needed to be on a plane the next morning, and at one in the morning he booked his flight for 9 a.m. At the World Cup event Mac placed second, which put him in the running for Sochi. He was sitting in AP English class when he received word that he made the team. Mac was the only men's freestyle aerials competitor for the United States. On February 17, 2014, at Rosa Khutor Extreme Park, in the men's freestyle aerials fourth-round qualifying finals Mac placed 5th with a score of 113.72, missing the medal round by one spot.

== Personal life ==
Mac began skiing before he reached the age of two years at Bromley Mountain in Vermont. Both his parents, Libby and David, as well as his older siblings, Lexi and Cody, were avid skiers. Originally from Madison, Connecticut, at age thirteen Mac moved to Lake Placid, New York, in 2008 to pursue his dream of becoming an Olympic skier. Two years later he moved across the country to Park City, Utah. He attended middle school in Connecticut and then did high school classes through an online program. His parents remained in Madison, so Mac moved to the Olympic Training Center by himself.
