= Travis Gerrits =

Canadian freestyle skier

Personal information
- Born: October 19, 1991 (age 35) Milton, Ontario, Canada
- Height: 5 ft 8 in (173 cm)
- Weight: 150 lb (68 kg)

Sport
- Country: Canada
- Sport: Freestyle skiing
Medal record
World Championships
| Silver medal – second place | 2013 Voss | Aerials |

Travis Gerrits (born October 19, 1991, in Milton, Ontario) is a former Canadian freestyle skier. Gerrits was the silver medalist from the 2013 FIS World Championships and was named the FIS Rookie of the Year in 2011.

== Early life ==
Gerrits attended W.I. Dick Public Middle School and Milton District High School, both located in the Town of Milton. He described missing half his classes in his school years due to his training and competitions.

With an initial background in gymnastics and trampoline, the latter of which Gerrits had competed at the provincial level, he had begun skiing at the age of 6. When he was 10, he competed at provincial skiing championships, where he had gained mentorship and support from fellow skier Nicolas Fontaine. Gerrits had spent his initial ski training sessions abroad in Lake Placid, New York, before the Canadian Freestyle Ski Association built a Quebec facility in 2004.

== Career ==
By the time Gerrits was 15, he had gained a position on the Canadian National Development Team for aerials. He was invited to the 2010 Winter Olympics as a forerunner for the men's aerials. He was named the international rookie of the year following the 2010 season.

Gerrits spent the end of his 2011–2012 season recovering from a MCL tear.

During the 2012–13 FIS Freestyle Skiing World Cup season, Gerrits won two silver medals.

Gerrits' next breakthrough came when he won silver at the 2013 World Championships in Norway, which meant his qualification for the 2014 Winter Olympics as a representative for Canada. After he commented on his success saying, "To me, second place is a victory in my eyes (because) I qualified for the Olympics. To be honest, I couldn't be happier. I did everything I wanted to do today and this whole season. It's awesome."

At the end of 2013, Gerrits won the World Cup aerials in Beijing, China.

In the 2014 Winter Olympics, Gerrits had come in 7th place for the Olympic men's aerials final.

Gerrits withdrew from the 2018 Winter Olympics qualifying to enter rehabilition for sustained inquires.

According to a 2019 interview, Gerrits had retired from his skiing career after 14 years on the Canadian national team.

== Personal life ==
In 2017, Gerrits opened up about his experience living as an athlete with bipolar I disorder. Diagnosed in 2014, he commented on his treatment management, and how his career results "came in spurts and peaks" due to his illness.

In 2020, Gerrits was inducted into the Milton Sports Hall of Fame.

== Results ==
Top Five Finishes

- Nor-Am Cup: 8
- World Cup: 7
- World Championships: 1

| Season | Date | Location | Result |
|---|---|---|---|
| 2006-07; 1 top five | January 28, 2007 | Mont Gabriel, Canada Nor-Am Cup | 5th |
| 2007-08; 1 top five | February 16, 2008 | Apex, Canada Nor-Am Cup | 3rd |
| 2008-09; 2 top five | January 11, 2009 | Apex, Canada Nor-Am Cup | 3rd |
| 2008-09; 2 top five | February 21, 2009 | Canada Olympic Park, Canada Nor-Am Cup | 2nd |
| 2009-10; 2 top five | December 21, 2010 | (United States) Utah Olympic Park, USA Nor-Am Cup | 2nd |
| 2009-10; 2 top five | March 2, 2010 | Apex, Canada Nor-Am Cup | 3rd |
| 2010-11; 3 top five | December 18, 2010 | Apex, Canada Nor-Am Cup | 2nd |
| 2010-11; 3 top five | December 19, 2010 | Apex, Canada Nor-Am Cup | 1st |
| 2010-11; 3 top five | January 8, 2011 | Mont Gabriel, Canada Nor-Am Cup | 3rd |
| 2011-12; 1 top five | January 15, 2012 | Mont Gabriel, Canada Nor-Am Cup | 3rd |
| 2012-13; 4 top five's | January 12, 2013 | Val Saint Come, Canada World Cup | 2nd |
| 2012-13; 4 top five's | February 1, 2013 | (United States) Deer Valley, USA World Cup | 2nd |
| 2012-13; 4 top five's | February 23, 2013 | Bukovel, Ukraine World Cup | 5th |
| 2012-13; 4 top five's | March 7, 2013 | Voss-Myrkdalen, Norway World Championship | 2nd |
| 2013-14; 2 top five's | December 15, 2013 | Beida Lake, China World Cup | 4th |
| 2013-14; 2 top five's | December 22, 2013 | Beijing, China World Cup | 1st |
| 2014-15; 1 top five | February 21, 2015 | Moscow, Russia World Cup | 4th |
| 2015-16; 1 top five | February 5, 2016 | (United States) Deer Valley, USA World Cup | 4th |
