= Han Xiaopeng =

Chinese freestyle skier

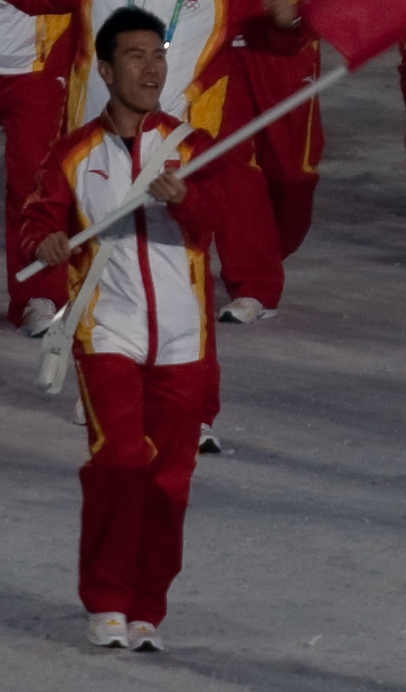
- Han at the 2010 Winter Olympics

Personal information
- Born: December 13, 1983 (age 42) Pei, Xuzhou, Jiangsu, China
Medal record
Men's freestyle skiing
Representing China
Olympic Games
Gold medal – first place	2006 Turin	Aerials
World Championships
Gold medal – first place	2007 Madonna di Campiglio	Aerials
Asian Games
Gold medal – first place	2007 Changchun	Aerials

Han Xiaopeng (simplified Chinese: 韩晓鹏; traditional Chinese: 韓曉鵬; pinyin: Hán Xiǎopéng; born December 13, 1983, in Pei, Xuzhou, Jiangsu, China) is a freestyle skier who competed at the 2006 Winter Olympics in Turin, Italy, and won gold in the men's aerials event. In this discipline he also won the World Championships in 2007. Han is the first Chinese male athlete to ever win a gold medal at the Winter Olympics.

Olympic Games
Preceded by Yang Yang	Flagbearer for China; Vancouver 2010	Succeeded by Tong Jian
Preceded by None	Flagbearer for China at the Olympics closing ceremony Turin 2006	Succeeded by Zhao Hongbo
