= Freestyle skiing at the 2007 Asian Winter Games – Women's aerials =

International sporting competition

Women's aerials at the 2007 Asian Winter Games
- Venue: Beida Lake Skiing Resort
- Dates: 31 January 2007
- Competitors: 5 from 2 nations

Medalists
gold medal	Li Nina	China
silver medal	Xu Mengtao	China
bronze medal	Zhang Xin	China
bronze medal	Ünenbatyn Maral	Mongolia

The women's aerials at the 2007 Asian Winter Games was held on 31 January 2007 at Beida Lake Skiing Resort in Jilin, China.

== Schedule ==
All times are China Standard Time (UTC+08:00)

Date	Time	Event
Wednesday, 31 January 2007	10:00	Qualification
Wednesday, 31 January 2007	10:30	Final

== Results ==
Rank	Athlete	Qual.	Final	Total
1st place, gold medalist(s)	Li Nina (CHN)	95.70	98.87	194.57
2nd place, silver medalist(s)	Xu Mengtao (CHN)	89.71	95.17	184.88
3rd place, bronze medalist(s)	Zhang Xin (CHN)	89.88	85.52	175.40
4	Guo Xinxin (CHN)	58.92	108.49	167.41
3rd place, bronze medalist(s)	Ünenbatyn Maral (MGL)	19.97	41.05	61.02

- Ünenbatyn Maral was awarded bronze because of no three-medal sweep per country rule.
