= Mykola Puzderko =

Ukrainian freestyle skier

Personal information
- Born: 13 June 1990 (age 36)

Sport
- Sport: Skiing
- Updated on 19 January 2015

Mykola Puzderko (born 13 June 1990) is a Ukrainian freestyle skier, specializing in aerials.

Puzderko competed at the 2014 Winter Olympics for Ukraine and he finished 20th.

Puzderko made his World Cup debut in February 2011. As of January 2015, he has the best result 10th in 2014/15 at Deer Valley. His best World Cup overall finish in aerials is 27th, in 2012/13.

== Performances ==
Level	Year	Event	Aerials
FWSCH	2013	Voss, Norway	DNS
OLY	2014	Sochi, Russia	20
FWSCH	2015	Kreischberg, Austria	21

=== World Cup ===
==== Positions ====
Season	Aerials	Overall
2010–11	37	171
2011–12	35	189
2012–13	27	157
2013–14	30	153
