= Thomas Lambert (skier) =

Swiss freestyle skier

Personal information
- Nationality: Swiss
- Born: 31 May 1984 (age 41)

Sport
- Sport: Freestyle skiing

Thomas Lambert (born 31 May 1984) is a Swiss freestyle skier. He was born in Mettmenstetten. He participated at the 2006 Winter Olympics in Turin, where he placed 14th in aerials, and at the 2010 Winter Olympics in Vancouver, where he placed 12th in aerials.
