= Qiu Sen =

Chinese freestyle skier

Personal information
- Nationality: Chinese
- Born: 26 January 1982 (age 43); Pei, China

Sport
- Sport: Freestyle skiing

Qiu Sen (born 26 January 1982) is a Chinese freestyle skier. He competed at the 2002 Winter Olympics and the 2006 Winter Olympics.
