= Wu Chao (skier) =

Chinese freestyle skier

Personal information
- Born: September 7, 1987 (age 38) Jilin, China

Sport
- Sport: Skiing

World Cup career
- Indiv. podiums: 3

Wu Chao (born September 7, 1987 in Jilin) is a Chinese freestyle skier, specializing in aerials.

Wu competed at the 2014 Winter Olympics for China. He placed 5th in the first qualifying round in the aerials, advancing to the final. In the first jump of the three-jump final, he finished 11th, not enough to advance further.

As of April 2014, his best showing at the World Championships is 8th, in the 2013 aerials.

Wu made his World Cup debut in December 2003. As of April 2014, he has three World Cup podium finishes, his best a silver at Beijing in 2013–14. His best World Cup overall finish in aerials is 7th, achieved three times.

== World Cup podiums ==
Date	Location	Rank	Event
19 December 2009	Changchun	3rd place, bronze medalist(s)	Aerials
17 December 2010	Beida Lake	3rd place, bronze medalist(s)	Aerials
22 December 2013	Beijing	2nd place, silver medalist(s)	Aerials
