= David Morris (skier) =

Australian skier

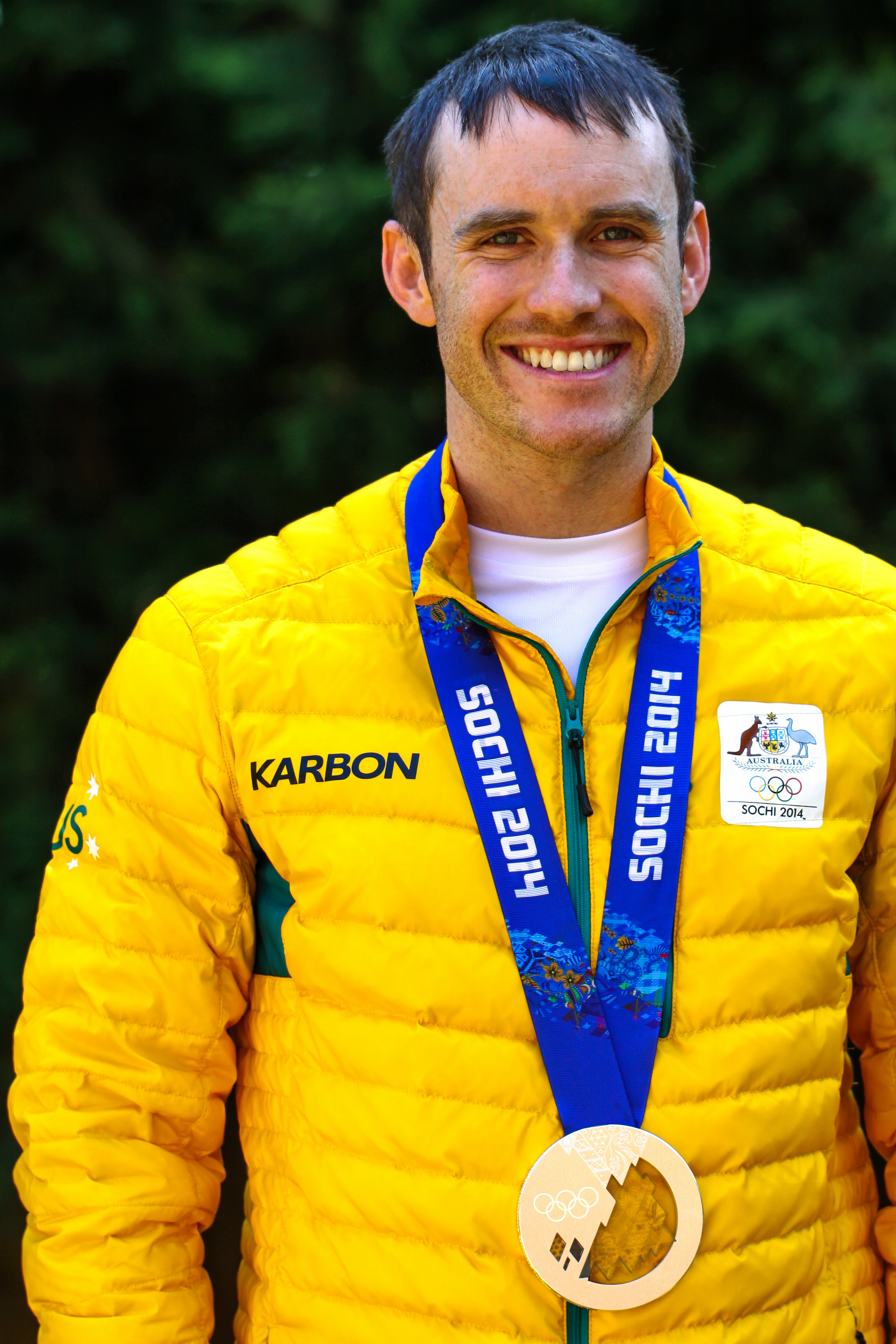
- David Morris, Australian Aerial Skier and Sochi 2014 Olympic Winter Games Silver Medallist

Personal information
- Nicknames: Davo, Dave, DTO
- Born: 31 August 1984 (age 42) Melbourne Australia
- Height: 171 cm (5 ft 7 in)
- Weight: 67 kg (148 lb)
- Website: www.aerialskier.com

Sport
- Country: Australia
- Sport: Freestyle skiing
Medal record
Men's Freestyle skiing
Representing Australia
Olympic Games
Silver medal – second place	2014 Sochi	Aerials

David John Morris (born 31 August 1984) is an Australian aerial/freestyle skier who competed in 3 Winter Olympic Games in 2010, 2014 and 2018. He is Australia's most successful male aerial skier, having competed across FIS World Cup, World Championships and Winter Olympic competitions. He is the first Australian male aerial skier to compete at two consecutive Olympic Games, and the first Australian medalist in the Olympic Men's Aerials.

== Early and personal life ==
Morris was born in Melbourne.

At about four years of age, he commenced a lifelong passion for gymnastics at the Nunawading Gymnastics and Sports Club (NGSC, formally known as the Nunawading Youth Club) and he learned to ski at age three. He has demonstrated capabilities in cricket, diving and football but has always returned to gymnastics and from there to aerial skiing.

He is a qualified Mathematics and Physical Education teacher and, when he is at home between training camps and competitions, occasionally works as an emergency relief teacher at Whitefriars College, Donvale. He also coaches gymnastics, cheerleading and trampoline and is in demand as a motivational speaker.

== Skiing career ==
=== Early aerial skiing career ===
Since Australia did not have a program for male aerial skiers, former Australian World Champion aerial skier Kirstie Marshall volunteered to coach him on weekends in the basics of aerial skiing and when she was expecting her second child, she enlisted the help of former Australian male aerial skier Jonathan Sweet, as a personal coach until Morris was ready for private training overseas.

=== Competitive performance ===
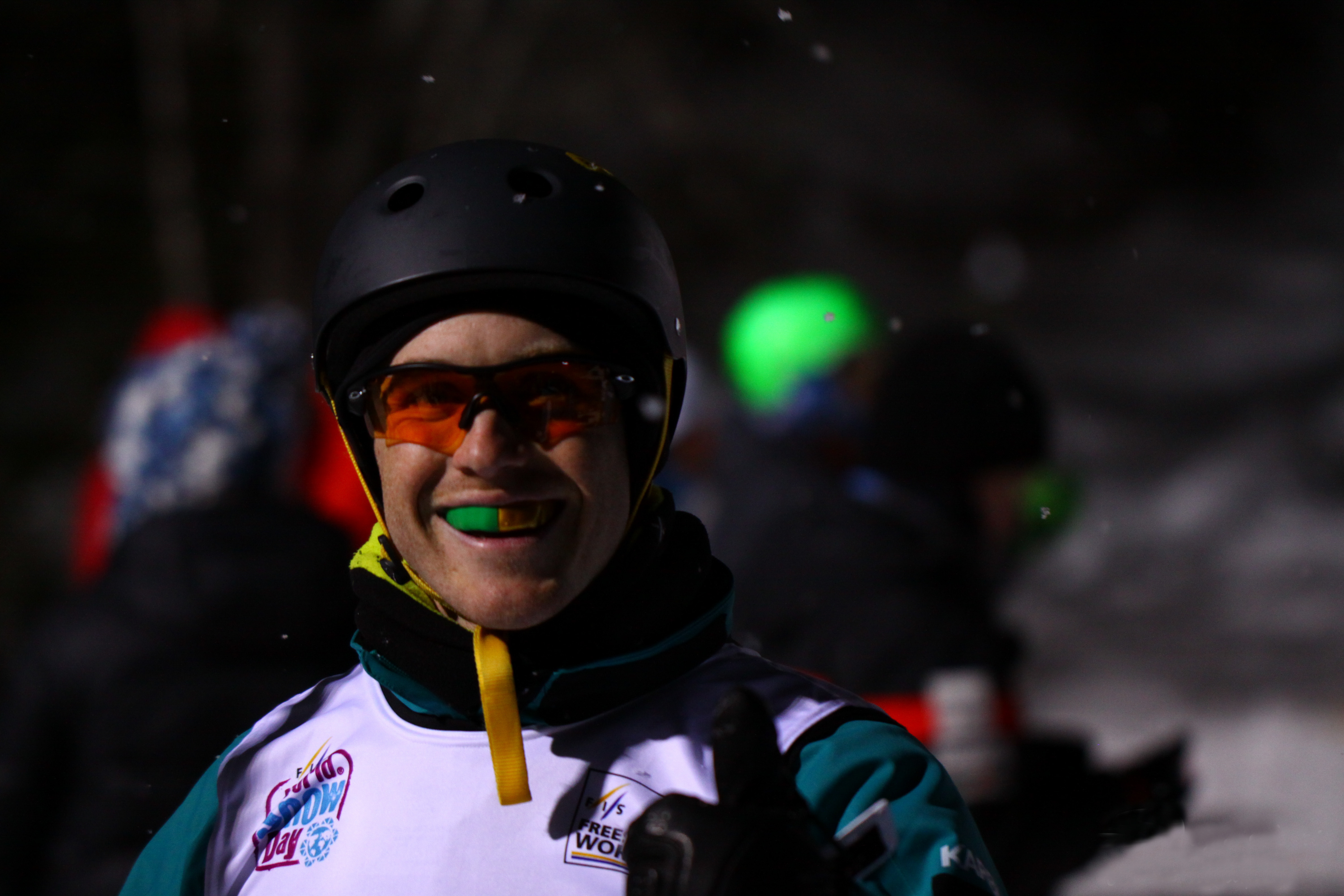
Australian Aerial Skier David Morris at the 2014 Lake Placid World Cup Event. Lake Placid, New York City.

Morris won his first medal (a Silver) in an International Skiing Federation (FIS) race (USA selections) on 20 December 2007 in Park City and has gone on to become Australia's most successful male Aerial Skier, finishing the 2012/13 season ranked second in the World Cup standings. He has achieved a number of wins in various FIS Competitions. He was the first Australia Male Aerial Skier to win a World Cup gold medal, and in doing so he became Australia's most successful male Aerial Skier. He would later go on to win a silver medal at the Sochi 2014 Winter Olympic Games, becoming Australia's first male aerial skier to do so.

Competition	No. of medals	No. of times competed	Best single result	Best overall season result
FIS Races	3	9	2nd	n/a
NorAm	4	16	1st (twice)	4th (2007/08 and 2008/09)
Europa Cup	3	6	2nd	10th (2012/13)
World Cup	5	39	1st	2nd (2013/14)
World Championship	1	4	3rd	n/a
Winter Olympics	1	3	2nd	n/a

- Results as per the FIS, Source:

=== 2010 Winter Olympics/Olympic debut ===
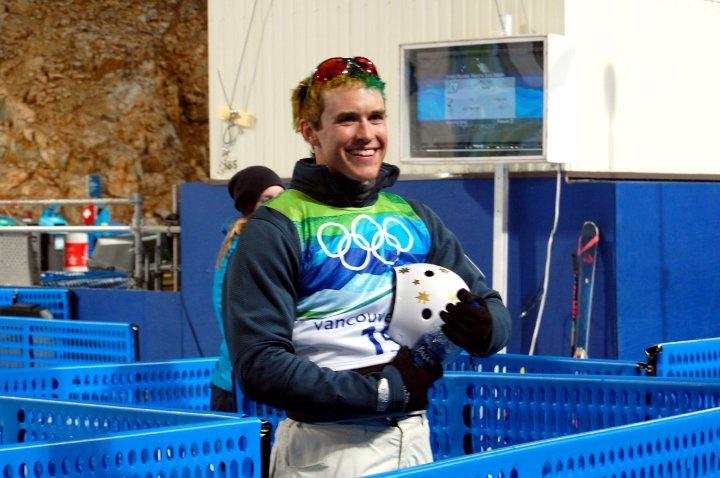
Australian Aerial Skier David Morris at the 2010 Winter Olympic Games in Vancouver, Canada

Morris' performances led to his selection in the Australian Olympic Team for the 2010 Winter Olympic Games in Vancouver, Canada, where he finished in 13th position.

He was the first Australian male to compete in aerial skiing at the Winter Olympics for 12 years. During the Vancouver 2010 Games, Morris was coached by Jerry Grossi who formerly competed in aerial skiing for the USA.

=== Injury and comeback ===
Morris concentrated on regaining his fitness through gym work and recommenced competitive aerials in 2012/13. His come-back season in 2012/13 proved to be his best ever with two podium finishes, including 1st place in Bukovel, Ukraine. His win was broadcast in Australia on Eurosport.

Morris was selected to compete for Australia at the Sochi 2014 Winter Olympics.

=== 2014 Winter Olympics ===
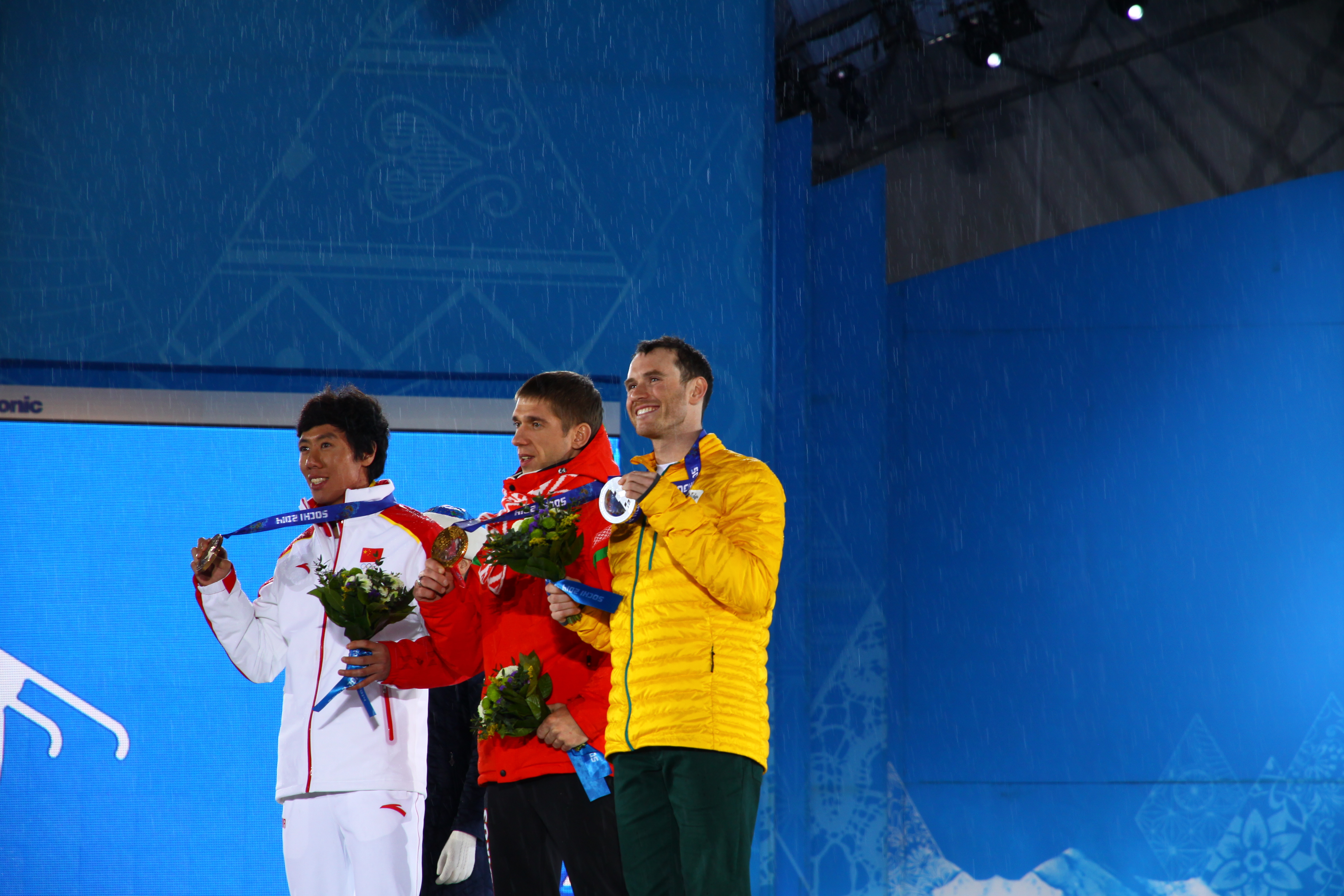
Sochi 2014 Men's Aerial Skiing Medallists. Anton Kushnir (Gold), David Morris (Silver), Jia Zongyang (Bronze)

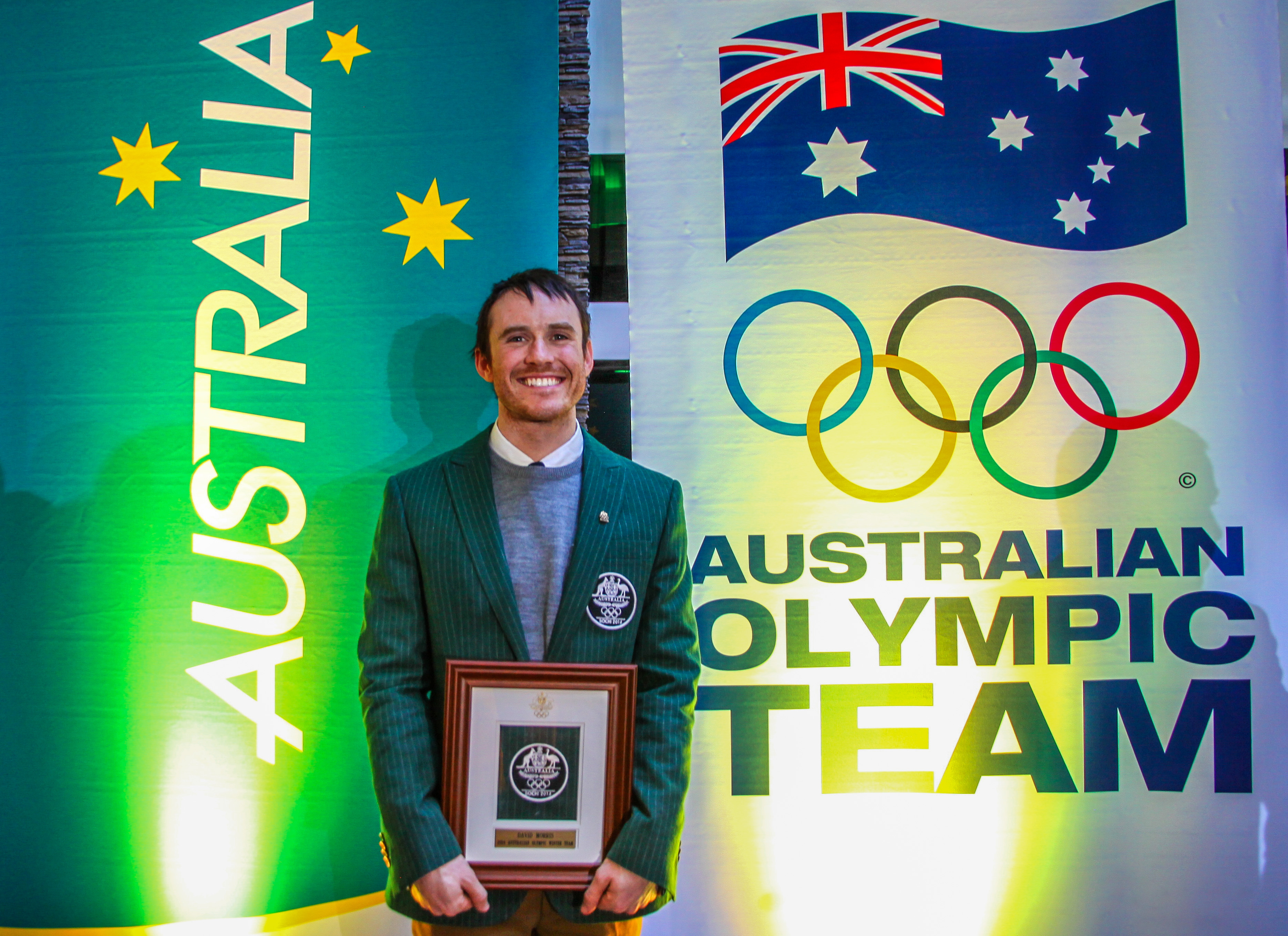
Morris at the 2014 Australia Winter Olympic Team Reception, Sochi, Russia.

Morris was one of 60 members of the Australian Winter Olympic team in the 2014 Olympic Winter Games in Sochi, Russia. He competed in the Men's Aerial Skiing competition held on 17 February 2014, winning the silver medal. He was coached by Cord Spero and Eli Budd. Morris was also elected to be the flag bearer for the Australian team at closing ceremony of the 2014 Sochi Olympic Winter Games.

=== 2018 Winter Olympics ===
Morris competed in the 2018 Winter Olympics where he finished 10th in the men's aerials final.

=== Awards ===
Apart from his sporting achievements and Olympic silver medal, Morris has also received various other honours and awards, including:

– 2014 Ski and Snowboard Australia Athlete of the Year, Joint winner with Torah Bright.

– 2014 Sir Wilfred Kent Hughes Award: Awarded by the Victorian Olympic Council.

– The award for "Senior Sportsman of the Year" at Whitefriars College in 2014 (David's high-school) has been named in his honour.

– 2013 Ski and Snowboard Australia Aerial Skiing Athlete of the Year.

=== Current statistics ===
As at 11 September 2015, Morris is ranked 30th in the world based on FIS points. At the Sochi 2014 Olympic Winter Games, he qualified 3rd in the Olympic Winter Games selection rankings. Morris finished the 2013–2014 Aerial Skiing World Cup season in 6th place. He has yet to compete in a subsequent World Cup season. He holds the Australian Record for the highest point score of 247.91 at the Lake Placid World Cup on 18 January 2013,(registration required) and the second highest point score of 242.93 at the Val Saint-Côme Freestyle skiing World Cup on 12 January 2013, for two consecutive jumps in an international competition.
