= Jia Zongyang =

Chinese freestyle skier

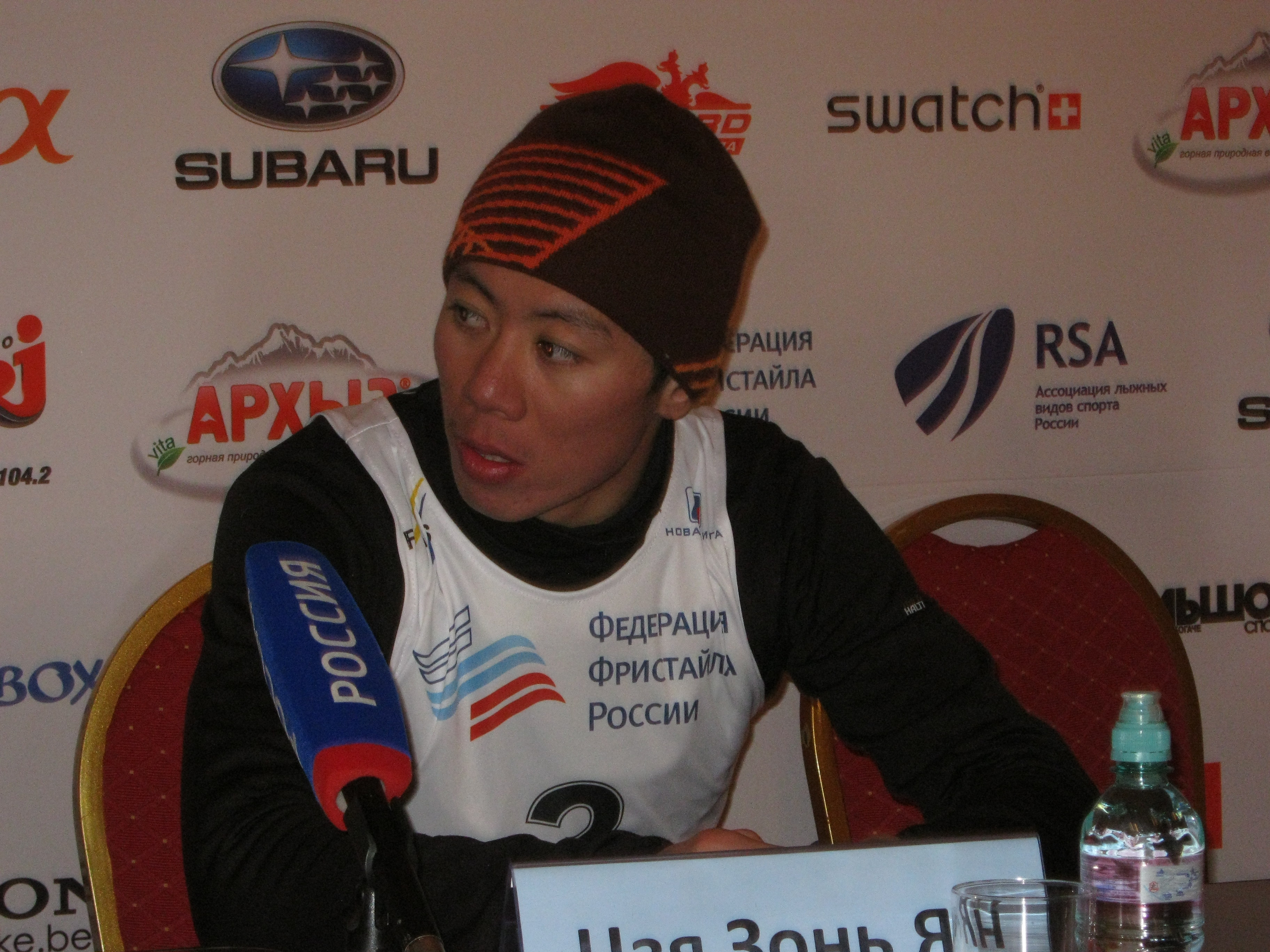

Medal record

Men's freestyle skiing

Representing China

Olympic Games
Silver medal – second place	2018 Pyeongchang	Aerials
Silver medal – second place	2022 Beijing	Mixed team aerials
Bronze medal – third place	2014 Sochi	Aerials

World Championships
Bronze medal – third place	2013 Voss	Aerials

Asian Games
Gold medal – first place	2011 Astana-Almaty	Aerials

Jia Zongyang
- Simplified Chinese: 贾宗洋
- Traditional Chinese: 賈宗洋
Transcriptions
Standard Mandarin
- Hanyu Pinyin: Jiǎ ZōngYáng
- IPA: [tɕjà tsʊ́ŋ jǎŋ]

Jia Zongyang (born 1 March 1991 in Fushun, Liaoning, China) is a Chinese aerial skier. He competed for China at the 2010, 2014, and 2018 Winter Olympics, winning a bronze medal in 2014 and a silver in 2018. At the 2010 Olympic Games in Vancouver, 18-year-old Jia Zongyang showed the best result in qualifying but took only sixth place in the final. He also competed at the 2022 Winter Olympics.
