= Liu Zhongqing =

Chinese freestyle skier

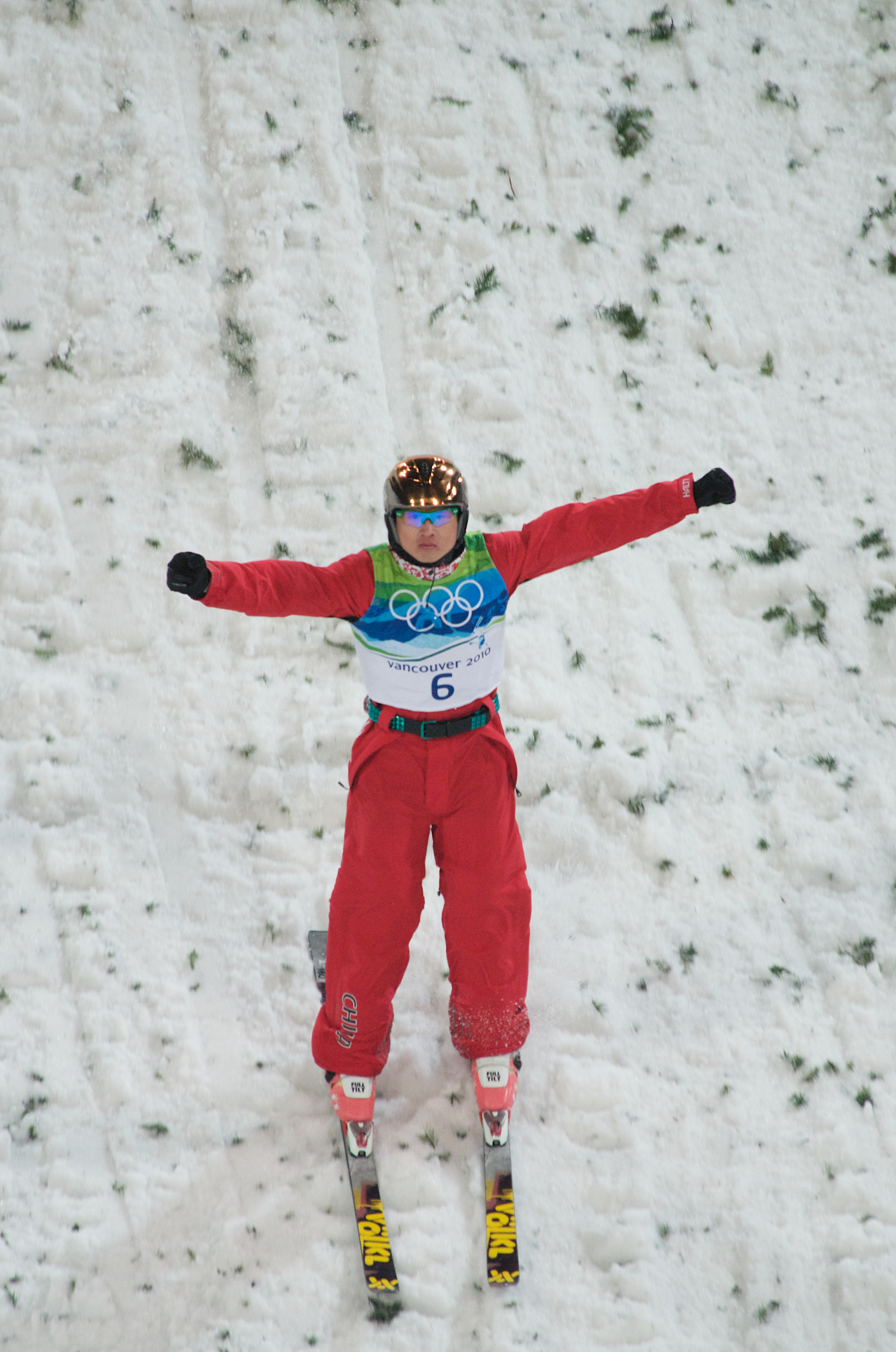
- Zhongqing at the 2010 Winter Olympics

Personal information
- Born: November 10, 1985 (age 40) Daqing, Heilongjiang, China
Medal record
Men's freestyle skiing
Representing China
Olympic Games
Bronze medal – third place	2010 Vancouver	Aerials
Asian Games
Silver medal – second place	2011 Astana-Almaty	Aerials
Bronze medal – third place	2007 Changchun	Aerials

Liu Zhongqing
- Simplified Chinese: 刘忠庆
- Traditional Chinese: 劉忠慶
Transcriptions
Standard Mandarin
- Hanyu Pinyin: Liú Zhōngqìng
- IPA: [ljǒʊ ʈʂʊ́ŋ tɕʰîŋ]

Liu Zhongqing (Chinese: 刘忠庆; pinyin: Liú Zhōngqìng; Mandarin pronunciation: [ljǒʊ ʈʂʊ́ŋ tɕʰîŋ]; born November 10, 1985, in Daqing, Heilongjiang) is a Chinese aerial skier. He won a bronze medal at the 2010 Winter Olympics in the aerials.
