= 2006–07 FIS Freestyle Skiing World Cup =

Freestyle skiing competitive season

Freestyle Skiing World Cup 2006/07
Discipline	Men	Women
Overall	(Australia) Dale Begg-Smith	(Canada) Jennifer Heil
Moguls	(Australia) Dale Begg-Smith	(Canada) Jennifer Heil
Dual moguls	(Australia) Dale Begg-Smith	(Canada) Jennifer Heil
Aerials	(Canada) Steve Omischl	(Australia) Jacqui Cooper
Ski Cross	(Switzerland) Audun Groenvold	(France) Ophélie David
Halfpipe	(Finland) Kalle Leinonen	(United States) Jessica Reedy
- Nations Cup: Canada

Competition
Locations	9	9
Individual	20	19
Cancelled	10	11

The 2006/07 FIS Freestyle Skiing World Cup was the twenty eight World Cup season in freestyle skiing organised by International Ski Federation. The season started on 9 December 2006 and ended on 3 March 2007. This season included five disciplines: aerials, moguls, dual moguls, ski cross and halfpipe.

Dual mogul events returned on world cup calendar as a separate title from moguls for last time.

== Men ==
=== Moguls ===
Num	Season	Date	Place	Event	Winner	Second	Third
31	1	13 January 2007	(United States) Deer Valley	DM	(France) Guilbaut Colas	(Canada) Vincent Marquis	(Sweden) Per Spett
32	2	6 February 2007	(France) La Plagne	DM	(Australia) Dale Begg-Smith	(Canada) Pierre-Alexandre Rousseau	(France) Guilbaut Colas
33	3	18 February 2007	(Japan) Inawashiro	DM	(Australia) Dale Begg-Smith	(Finland) Mikko Ronkainen	(France) Guilbaut Colas
		14 December 2006	(France) Tignes	MO	rescheduled to La Plagne		
248	1	6 January 2007	(Canada) Mont Gabriel	MO	(Australia) Dale Begg-Smith	(France) Guilbaut Colas	(Canada) Alexandre Bilodeau
249	2	11 January 2007	(United States) Deer Valley	MO	(United States) Nathan Roberts	(France) Grégoire Dufosse	(Japan) Osamu Ueno
		18 January 2007	(United States) Lake Placid	MO	cancelled		
		2 February 2007	(Czech Republic) Špindlerův Mlýn	MO	rescheduled to Voss		
250	3	5 February 2007 (Note: replaces moguls event from Tignes for men.)	(France) La Plagne	MO	(Finland) Sami Mustonen	(Canada) Alexandre Bilodeau	(Australia) Dale Begg-Smith
251	4	17 February 2007	(Japan) Inawashiro	MO	(United States) Nathan Roberts	(United States) Jay Bowman-Kirigin	(Japan) Yugo Tsukita
252	5	24 February 2007	(Canada) Apex	MO	(Australia) Dale Begg-Smith	(Canada) Alexandre Bilodeau	(Canada) Maxime Gingras
253	6	2 March 2007 (Note: replaces moguls event from Špindlerův Mlýn for men.)	(Norway) Voss	MO	(Australia) Dale Begg-Smith	(Japan) Nobuyuki Nishi	(Canada) Alexandre Bilodeau
254	7	3 March 2007	(Norway) Voss	MO	(Australia) Dale Begg-Smith	(Finland) Sami Mustonen	(United States) David Babic

=== Aerials ===
Num	Season	Date	Place	Event	Winner	Second	Third
		2 December 2006	(Australia) Mount Buller	AE	cancelled		
		3 December 2006	(Australia) Mount Buller	AE	cancelled		
249	1	9 December 2006	(China) Beida Lake	AE	(United States) Ryan St. Onge	(China) Xiaopeng Han	(Canada) Jeff Bean
250	2	10 December 2006	(China) Beida Lake	AE	(Canada) Steve Omischl	(Belarus) Timofei Slivets	(Belarus) Alexei Grishin
251	3	7 January 2007	(Canada) Mont Gabriel	AE	(Canada) Cord Spero	(Canada) Ryan Blais	(United States) Jeret Peterson
252	4	11 January 2007 (Note: replaces aerials event from Lake Placid for men.)	(United States) Deer Valley	AE	(United States) Jeret Peterson	(Canada) Steve Omischl	(China) Qui Sen
253	5	12 January 2007	(United States) Deer Valley	AE	(United States) Jeret Peterson	(Belarus) Anton Kushnir	(Ukraine) Stanislav Kravchuk
		20 January 2007	(United States) Lake Placid	AE	rescheduled to Deer Valley		
		3 February 2007	(Czech Republic) Špindlerův Mlýn	AE	cancelled		
254	6	25 February 2007	(Canada) Apex	AE	(Canada) Steve Omischl	(Canada) Kyle Nissen	(United States) Jeret Peterson

=== Ski Cross ===
Num	Season	Date	Place	Event	Winner	Second	Third
		17 December 2006	(Austria) Kreischberg	SX	cancelled		
23	1	10 January 2007	(France) Flaine	SX	(Norway) Audun Grønvold	(Japan) Hiroomi Takizawa	(Czech Republic) Tomáš Kraus
24	2	2 February 2007	(France) Les Contamines	SX	(Norway) Audun Grønvold	(Czech Republic) Tomáš Kraus	(Sweden) Eric Iljans
		4 February 2007	(Czech Republic) Špindlerův Mlýn	SX	cancelled		
25	3	16 February 2007	(Japan) Inawashiro	SX	(Japan) Hiroomi Takizawa	(Czech Republic) Tomáš Kraus	(Switzerland) Michael Schmid

=== Halfpipe ===
Num	Season	Date	Place	Event	Winner	Second	Third
		14 January 2007	(France) Les Contamines	HP	cancelled		
6	1	23 February 2007	(Canada) Apex	HP	(Finland) Kalle Leinonen	(Finland) Antti-Jussi Kempainen	(Canada) Josh Bibby
		2 March 2007	(Norway) Voss	HP	cancelled		

== Ladies ==
=== Moguls ===
Num	Season	Date	Place	Event	Winner	Second	Third
31	1	13 January 2007	(United States) Deer Valley	DM	(Canada) Kristi Richards	(Canada) Jennifer Heil	(United States) Hannah Kearney
32	2	6 February 2007	(France) La Plagne	DM	(Canada) Jennifer Heil	(Norway) Ingrid Berntsen	(Sweden) Sara Kjellin
		18 January 2007	(Japan) Inawashiro	DM	cancelled		
		14 December 2006	(France) Tignes	MO	rescheduled to La Plagne		
248	1	6 January 2007	(Canada) Mont Gabriel	MO	(United States) Shannon Bahrke	(Sweden) Sara Kjellin	(Austria) Margarita Marbler
249	2	11 January 2007	(United States) Deer Valley	MO	(United States) Shannon Bahrke	(Canada) Jennifer Heil	(United States) Hannah Kearney
		18 January 2007	(United States) Lake Placid	MO	cancelled		
		2 February 2007	(Czech Republic) Špindlerův Mlýn	MO	rescheduled to Voss		
250	3	5 February 2007 (Note: replaces moguls event from Tignes for ladies.)	(France) La Plagne	MO	(Canada) Jennifer Heil	(Italy) Deborah Scanzio	(Austria) Margarita Marbler
251	4	17 February 2007	(Japan) Inawashiro	MO	(Canada) Jennifer Heil	(United States) Michelle Roark	(Canada) Stéphanie St-Pierre
252	5	24 February 2007	(Canada) Apex	MO	(Canada) Jennifer Heil	(United States) Shanon Bahrke	(Canada) Kristi Richards
253	6	2 March 2007 (Note: replaces moguls event from Špindlerův Mlýn for ladies.)	(Norway) Voss	MO	(Canada) Jennifer Heil	(Austria) Margarita Marbler	(Canada) Stéphanie St-Pierre
254	7	3 March 2007	(Norway) Voss	MO	(Canada) Jennifer Heil	(Austria) Margarita Marbler	(Canada) Kristi Richards

=== Aerials ===
Num	Season	Date	Place	Event	Winner	Second	Third
		2 December 2006	(Australia) Mount Buller	AE	cancelled		
		3 December 2006	(Australia) Mount Buller	AE	cancelled		
251	1	9 December 2006	(China) Beida Lake	AE	(China) Nina Li	(China) Xin Zhang	(China) Jiao Wang
252	2	10 December 2006	(China) Beida Lake	AE	(China) Nina Li	(Australia) Jacqui Cooper	(China) Xu Mengtao
253	3	7 January 2007	(Canada) Mont Gabriel	AE	(Australia) Jacqui Cooper	(Switzerland) Manuela Müller	(Canada) Veronika Bauer
254	4	11 January 2007 (Note: replaces aerials event from Lake Placid for ladies.)	(United States) Deer Valley	AE	(Australia) Jacqui Cooper	(China) Nina Li	(Belarus) Alla Tsuper
255	5	12 January 2007	(United States) Deer Valley	AE	(Switzerland) Evelyne Leu	(China) Nina Li	(China) Xinxin Guo
		20 January 2007	(United States) Lake Placid	AE	rescheduled to Deer Valley		
		3 February 2007	(Czech Republic) Špindlerův Mlýn	AE	cancelled		
256	6	25 February 2007	(Canada) Apex	AE	(Australia) Jacqui Cooper	(China) Shuang Cheng	(China) Nina Li

=== Ski Cross ===
Num	Season	Date	Place	Event	Winner	Second	Third
		17 December 2006	(Austria) Kreischberg	SX	cancelled		
23	1	10 January 2007	(France) Flaine	SX	(Sweden) Magdalena Iljans	(France) Ophélie David	(Czech Republic) Seraina Murk
24	2	2 February 2007	(France) Les Contamines	SX	(France) Méryll Boulangeat	(France) Ophélie David	(Austria) Katharina Gutensohn
		4 February 2007	(Czech Republic) Špindlerův Mlýn	SX	cancelled		
25	3	16 February 2007	(Japan) Inawashiro	SX	(France) Ophélie David	(Sweden) Magdalena Iljans	(France) Méryll Boulangeat

=== Halfpipe ===
Num	Season	Date	Place	Event	Winner	Second	Third
		14 January 2007	(France) Les Contamines	HP	cancelled		
6	1	23 February 2007	(Canada) Apex	HP	(United States) Jessica Reedy	(Australia) Davina Williams	(United States) Jen Hudak
		2 March 2007	(Norway) Voss	HP	cancelled		

== Men's standings ==
=== Overall ===
Rank		Points
1	(Australia) Dale Begg-Smith	78.40
2	(Canada) Steve Omischl	67.67
3	(United States) Jeref Peterson	61.33
4	(France) Guilbaut Colas	49.60
5	(Norway) Audun Groenvold	44.40

- Standings after 20 races.

=== Moguls ===
Rank		Points
1	(Australia) Dale Begg-Smith	784
2	(France) Guilbaut Colas	469
3	(Canada) Alex Bilodeau	408
4	(United States) Nathan Roberts	392
5	(Canada) P.-A. Rousseau	349

- Standings after 7 races.

=== Aerials ===
Rank		Points
1	(Canada) Steve Omischl	406
2	(United States) Jeref Peterson	368
3	(Canada) Cord Spero	228
4	(China) Sen Qui	221
5	(Canada) Kyle Nissen	199

- Standings after 6 races.

=== Ski Cross ===
Rank		Points
1	(Norway) Audun Groenvold	222
2	(Czech Republic) Tomáš Kraus	220
3	(Japan) Hiroomi Takizawa	180
4	(Switzerland) Michael Schmid	110
5	(Sweden) Eric Iljans	94

- Standings after 3 races.

=== Halfpipe ===
Rank		Points
1	(Finland) Kalle Leinonen	100
2	(Finland) Anti-Jussi Kemppainen	80
3	(Canada) Josh Bibby	60
4	(United States) Tucker Perkins	50
5	(Finland) Mike Henitiuk	45

- Standings after 1 race.

=== Dual moguls ===
Rank		Points
1	(Australia) Dale Begg-Smith	334
2	(France) Guilbaut Colas	317
3	(Canada) P.-A. Rousseau	228
4	(Canada) Alex Bilodeau	226
5	(United States) Nathan Roberts	225

- Standings after 3 races.

== Ladies' standings ==
=== Overall ===
Rank		Points
1	(Canada) Jennifer Heil	87.11
2	(Australia) Jacqui Cooper	79.17
3	(China) Nina Li	70.00
4	(United States) Shannon Bahrke	55.11
5	(France) Ophélie David	52.00

- Standings after 19 races.

=== Moguls ===
Rank		Points
1	(Canada) Jennifer Heil	784
2	(United States) Shannon Bahrke	496
3	(Austria) Margarita Marbler	442
4	(Canada) Kristi Richards	381
5	(Canada) Stéphanie St-Pierre	319

- Standings after 7 races.

=== Aerials ===
Rank		Points
1	(Australia) Jacqui Cooper	475
2	(China) Nina Li	420
3	(Switzerland) Evelyne Leu	274
4	(China) Xinxin Guo	259
5	(Belarus) Alla Tsuper	215

- Standings after 6 races.

=== Ski Cross ===
Rank		Points
1	(France) Ophélie David	260
2	(Sweden) Magdalena Iljans	225
3	(France) Meryll Boulangeat	168
4	(Switzerland) Seraina Murk	150
5	(Switzerland) Emilie Serain	122

- Standings after 3 races.

=== Halfpipe ===
Rank		Points
1	(United States) Jessica Reedy	100
2	(Australia) Davina Williams	80
3	(United States) Jen Hudak	60
4	(Canada) Rosalind Groenvold	50
5	(Norway) Ingrid Berntsen	45

- Standings after 1 race.

=== Dual moguls ===
Rank		Points
1	(Canada) Jennifer Heil	384
2	(United States) Shannon Bahrke	319
3	(Sweden) Sara Kjellin	261
4	(Canada) Kristi Richards	233
5	(Austria) Margarita Marbler	214

- Standings after 2 races.

== Nations Cup ==
=== Overall ===
Rank		Points
1	Canada	678
2	United States	525
3	China	358
4	France	353
5	Switzerland	284

- Standings after 39 races.

=== Men ===
Rank		Points
1	Canada	382
2	United States	266
3	France	213
4	Japan	134
5	Switzerland	133

- Standings after 20 races.

=== Ladies ===
Rank		Points
1	Canada	296
2	United States	259
3	China	247
4	Switzerland	151
5	France	140

- Standings after 19 races.
