= 2000–01 FIS Freestyle Skiing World Cup =

Freestyle skiing competitive season

Freestyle Skiing World Cup 2000/01
Discipline	Men	Women
Overall	(Finland) Mikko Ronkainen	(Australia) Jacqui Cooper
Moguls	(Finland) Mikko Ronkainen	(Norway) Kari Traa
Aerials	(United States) Eric Bergoust	(Australia) Jacqui Cooper
- Nations Cup: United States

Competition
Locations	9	9
Individual	15	15
Cancelled	1	1

The 2000/01 FIS Freestyle Skiing World Cup was the twenty second World Cup season in freestyle skiing organised by International Ski Federation. The season started on 12 August 2000 and ended on 11 March 2001. This season included two disciplines: aerials and moguls. Dual moguls title was not awarded because of only one event on both sides of world cup calendar.

== Men ==
=== Moguls ===
Num	Season	Date	Place	Event	Winner	Second	Third
22	1	10 February 2001	(Japan) Iizuna kogen	DM	(Canada) Stéphane Rochon	(Japan) Yugo Tsukita	(Japan) Yusuke Kitamura
		11 March 2001	(Finland) Himos	DM	cancelled		
188	1	14 December 2000	(France) Tignes	MO	(Finland) Janne Lahtela	(Finland) Sami Mustonen	(Finland) Tapio Luusua
189	2	7 January 2001	(United States) Deer Valley	MO	(Finland) Mikko Ronkainen	(United States) Evan Dybvig	(Finland) Janne Lahtela
190	3	12 January 2001	(Canada) Mont Tremblant	MO	(Finland) Janne Lahtela	(United States) Evan Dybvig	(France) Cédric Regnier-Lafforgue
191	4	28 January 2001	(United States) Sunday River	MO	(United States) Travis Ramos	(United States) Jonny Moseley	(Finland) Arttu Leppäluoto
192	5	3 February 2001	(Japan) Inawashiro	MO	(Finland) Janne Lahtela	(Canada) Pierre-Alexandre Rousseau	(United States) Travis-Antone Cabral
193	6	11 February 2001	(Japan) Iizuna kogen	MO	(Finland) Mikko Ronkainen	(Canada) Pierre-Alexandre Rousseau	(United States) Toby Dawson
194	7	10 March 2001	(Finland) Himos	MO	(United States) Toby Dawson	(Finland) Mikko Ronkainen	(Canada) Pierre-Alexandre Rousseau

=== Aerials ===
Num	Season	Date	Place	Event	Winner	Second	Third
192	1	12 August 2000	(Australia) Mt. Buller	AE	(United States) Eric Bergoust	(United States) Jerry Grossi	(Canada) Steve Omischl
193	2	13 August 2000	(Australia) Mt. Buller	AE	(United States) Eric Bergoust	(Czech Republic) Aleš Valenta	(Canada) Andy Capicik
194	3	2 December 2000	(Canada) Blackcomb	AE	(United States) Joe Pack	(United States) Eric Bergoust	(Canada) Steve Omischl
195	4	6 January 2001	(United States) Deer Valley	AE	(Canada) Nicolas Fontaine	(Canada) Jeff Bean	(United States) Joe Pack
196	5	13 January 2001	(Canada) Mont Tremblant	AE	(Canada) Nicolas Fontaine	(Belarus) Dmitri Dashinski	(Belarus) Aleksei Grishin
197	6	27 January 2001	(United States) Sunday River	AE	(Belarus) Dmitri Dashinski	(United States) Joe Pack	(United States) Eric Bergoust
198	7	10 March 2001	(Finland) Himos	AE	(Belarus) Aleksei Grishin	(Canada) Steve Omischl	(Austria) Christian Rijavec

== Ladies ==
=== Moguls ===
Num	Season	Date	Place	Event	Winner	Second	Third
22	1	10 February 2001	(Japan) Iizuna kogen	DM	(Canada) Tami Bradley	(United States) Ann Battelle	(Norway) Kari Traa
		11 March 2001	(Finland) Himos	DM	cancelled		
188	1	14 December 2000	(France) Tignes	MO	(Norway) Kari Traa	(Japan) Aiko Uemura	(France) Berenice Gregoire
189	2	7 January 2001	(United States) Deer Valley	MO	(United States) Hannah Hardaway	(Norway) Kari Traa	(Finland) Minna Karhu
190	3	12 January 2001	(Canada) Mont Tremblant	MO	(Norway) Kari Traa	(Canada) Jennifer Heil	(Austria) Margarita Marbler
191	4	28 January 2001	(United States) Sunday River	MO	(Norway) Kari Traa	(Japan) Tae Satoya	(United States) Hannah Hardaway
192	5	3 February 2001	(Japan) Inawashiro	MO	(Norway) Kari Traa	(Japan) Aiko Uemura	(United States) Shannon Bahrke
193	6	11 February 2001	(Japan) Iizuna kogen	MO	(Norway) Kari Traa	(United States) Hannah Hardaway	(Japan) Aiko Uemura
194	7	10 March 2001	(Finland) Himos	MO	(United States) Hannah Hardaway	(Japan) Aiko Uemura	(Canada) Jennifer Heil

=== Aerials ===
Num	Season	Date	Place	Event	Winner	Second	Third
193	1	12 August 2000	(Australia) Mt. Buller	AE	(Australia) Jacqui Cooper	(Canada) Veronika Bauer	(Russia) Natalia Orekhova
194	2	13 August 2000	(Australia) Mt. Buller	AE	(Australia) Jacqui Cooper	(Australia) Alisa Camplin	(Canada) Veronika Bauer
195	3	2 December 2000	(Canada) Blackcomb	AE	(Belarus) Alla Tsuper	(Canada) Deidra Dionne	(Australia) Jacqui Cooper
196	4	6 January 2001	(United States) Deer Valley	AE	(Switzerland) Evelyne Leu	(Australia) Jacqui Cooper	(United States) Emily Cook
197	5	13 January 2001	(Canada) Mont Tremblant	AE	(Belarus) Alla Tsuper	(China) Nannan Xu	(Norway) Hilde Synnøve Lid
198	6	27 January 2001	(United States) Sunday River	AE	(Australia) Jacqui Cooper	(Belarus) Alla Tsuper	(Switzerland) Evelyne Leu
199	7	10 March 2001	(Finland) Himos	AE	(China) Nannan Xu	(Australia) Jacqui Cooper	(Belarus) Alla Tsuper

== Men's standings ==
=== Overall ===
Rank		Points
1	(Finland) Mikko Ronkainen	92
2	(United States) Eric Bergoust	91
3	(United States) Joe Pack	90
4	(Finland) Janne Lahtela	90
5	(Belarus) Dmitri Dashinski	89

- Standings after 15 races.

=== Moguls ===
Rank		Points
1	(Finland) Mikko Ronkainen	460
2	(Finland) Janne Lahtela	448
3	(Canada) Pierre-Alexandre Rousseau	440
4	(France) Richard Gay	404
5	(United States) Ryan Riley	392

- Standings after 7 races.

=== Aerials ===
Rank		Points
1	(United States) Eric Bergoust	456
2	(United States) Joe Pack	452
3	(Belarus) Dmitri Dashinski	444
4	(Canada) Steve Omischl	436
5	(Canada) Andy Capicik	424

- Standings after 7 races.

== Ladies' standings ==
=== Overall ===
Rank		Points
1	(Australia) Jacqui Cooper	98
2	(Norway) Kari Traa	97
3	(Belarus) Alla Tsuper	94
4	(Japan) Aiko Uemura	89
5	(China) Nannan Xu	89

- Standings after 15 races.

=== Moguls ===
Rank		Points
1	(Norway) Kari Traa	484
2	(Japan) Aiko Uemura	444
3	(United States) Hannah Hardaway	440
4	(Canada) Jennifer Heil	428
5	(Finland) Minna Karhu	408

- Standings after 7 races.

=== Aerials ===
Rank		Points
1	(Australia) Jacqui Cooper	482
2	(Belarus) Alla Tsuper	468
3	(China) Nannan Xu	444
4	(Canada) Veronika Bauer	440
5	(Australia) Alisa Camplin	424

- Standings after 7 races.

== Nations Cup ==
=== Overall ===
Rank		Points
1	United States	1622
2	Canada	1352
3	France	506
4	Finland	497
5	Japan	389

- Standings after 30 races.

=== Men ===
Rank		Points
1	United States	927
2	Canada	775
3	Finland	415
4	France	342
5	Belarus	220

- Standings after 15 races.

=== Ladies ===
Rank		Points
1	United States	695
2	Canada	577
3	Australia	342
4	Switzerland	239
5	Norway	233

- Standings after 15 races.
