= Aleksei Grishin =

Belarusian freestyle skier (born 1979)

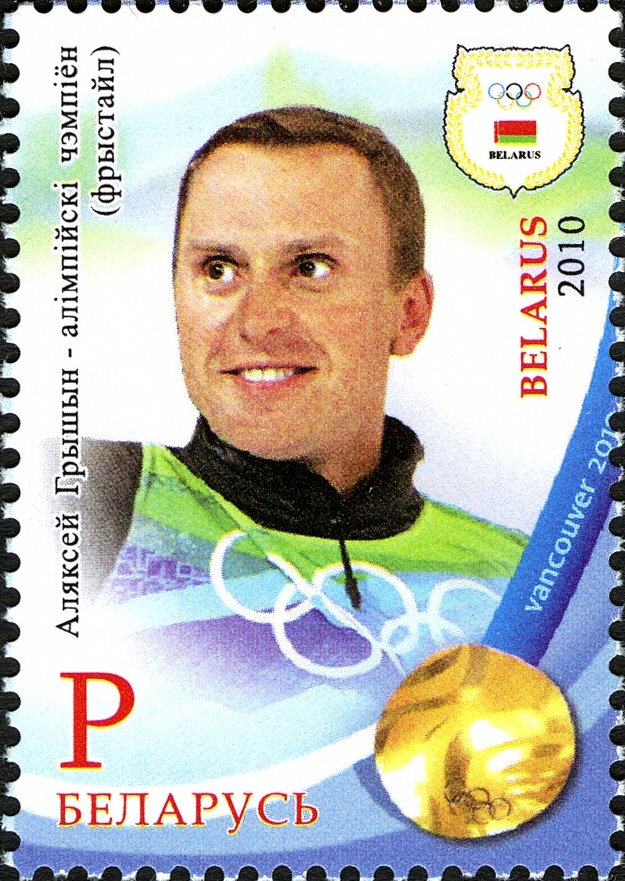
- Grishin on a 2010 Belarusian stamp

Personal information
- Born: 18 June 1979 (age 47) Minsk, Byelorussian SSR, USSR, now Belarus
- Years active: 1995–2014
- Height: 1.70 m (5 ft 7 in)
- Weight: 70 kg (154 lb)

Sport
- Sport: Freestyle skiing
- Club: RTsFVS Minsk oblast
Medal record
Men's freestyle skiing
Representing Belarus
Olympic Games
Gold medal – first place	2010 Vancouver	Aerials
Bronze medal – third place	2002 Salt Lake City	Aerials
World Championships
Gold medal – first place	2001 Whistler	Aerials
Silver medal – second place	2003 Deer Valley	Aerials
Bronze medal – third place	2005 Ruka	Aerials

Aleksei Gennadyevich Grishin (Belarusian: Аляксей Генадзьевіч Грышын; Russian: Алексей Геннадьевич Гришин; born 18 June 1979) is a Belarusian freestyle skier who competed at five consecutive Olympics from 1998 to 2014. He won Belarus' only medal at the 2002 Winter Olympics, a bronze in aerials. In 2010, he won the first ever Winter Olympics gold medal for his country, again in the aerials. He finished fourth in 2006 and eighth in 1998. He was the Olympic flag bearer for Belarus at the opening ceremony of the 2014 Games.

== Early career ==
Aleksei Grishin began his freestyle skiing career at the age of eight after his mother saw a newspaper advertisement recruiting skiers for the sport.

Grishin made his international competition debut at the European Cup at Raubichi, Belarus in December 1995, finishing 11th on the first day of competition and 21st on the second day. His first podium finish at an international competition, placing second, was at the International Youth Championship in Chatel, France in March 1996.

He made his debut at the FIS Freestyle Ski World Cup in the following year, finishing fourth at the Piancavallo event in Italy in December 1997. This was followed by his Olympics debut at the 1998 Winter Olympics. He scored 217.84 points after two jumps, placing ninth in the competition, and qualified for the finals. In the finals, he moved up one spot and finished eighth behind fellow countryman Dmitry Dashchinsky, who won a bronze medal in this event. Grishin finished with a silver medal again in the World Cup circuit at Meiringen-Hasliberg in Switzerland in March 1998.

His first competition in the FIS Freestyle World Ski Championships also took place at the Meiringen-Hasliberg ski resort; he finished 26th in the 1999 event.

== Career ==
=== 1999–2000 season ===
Grishin reached first place at the first stop of the 1999–2000 circuit in Mount Buller, Victoria on 11 September 1999. The next day he finished in first place again. In the remaining events of the circuit that year, he finished in second place and third place once each, achieving second in aerials competition and third overall.

=== 2000–2001 season ===
In the 2000–2001 World Cup circuit, he finished with one first place and one third place in seven races. In between the World Cup competitions, he won gold at the 2001 World Ski Championships in Whistler-Blackcomb.

=== 2001–2002 season ===
He began the 2001–2002 World Cup ski season with an eighth-place finish at Mount Buller. He placed fourth and second at Mont Tremblant, Canada, followed by first and third place at Lake Placid in January 2002. He finished second in the standings after six World Cup events.

At the 2002 Winter Olympics in Salt Lake City, he finished first with 251.76 points in the qualification round and advanced to the finals. He placed third overall in the finals, earning him a bronze medal. His bronze medal was the only medal won by Belarus at that Olympics. He was chosen to be the flag bearer for Belarus at the closing ceremony of the 2002 Winter Olympics.

=== 2002–2003 season ===
Grishin began the 2002–2003 World Cup competition with a second-place finish on the first day of competition at Mount Buller, and tenth place on the second day. He finished no higher than ninth place in the four subsequent races in January 2003. He attempted to defend his World Ski Championships title at the 2003 event in Deer Valley, falling just under two points behind Dimitri Arkhipov of Russia. Returning to the World Cup competition, he finished with a second, tenth, and fourth place, respectively, in the remaining three races. He finished fifth in the aerials standings after nine races.

=== 2003–2004 season ===
In the 2003–2004 World Cup, Grishin had a first-place finish at Mont Tremblant and second-place finish at Lake Placid in January 2004. He had one more podium finish, a first place in Harbin in February. After 12 races, he was third in the aerials standings.

=== 2004–2005 season ===
In the 2004–2005 World Cup season, Grishin started four races, finishing no higher than eleventh place, including the fourth race where he finished at 28th place (out of 35 competitors) on the first day at Lake Placid in January. On the second day at Lake Placid, he improved and finished in sixth place. In the next four races, he had two third-place finishes. He finished in eighth place after 12 races. In other races, he won a gold medal at the European Cup in Arosa, Switzerland, in December 2004 and a bronze medal in the FIS Freestyle World Ski Championships 2005 in March at Ruka, Finland.

=== 2005–2006 season ===
At the beginning of the 2005–2006 skiing season, Grishin had a third-place finish on the second day at Mount Buller, followed by an eighth and fifth-place finish at Changchun. He finished with a 27th, 20th, and 15th place in the three World Cup races leading up to the 2006 Winter Olympics.

At this Olympics, he finished fourth in the qualifiers and advanced to the finals. After jump 1 in the finals, he was placed fifth. Jump 2 elevated his standing to fourth place overall, but behind his fellow countryman Dmitri Dashinski who finished with a silver medal.

Grishin finished this skiing season with a second place at the event in Davos, Switzerland, but did not participate in the final event held two weeks later at Apex Mountain Resort, Canada. He finished 10th in the standings after 11 events.

=== 2006–2007 season ===
Grishin had only one podium finish (third place) in the 2006–2007 World Cup season, finishing 14th after six races. He finished 15th at the 2007 Freestyle World Ski Championships competition.

=== 2007–2008 season ===
Grishin failed to reach the podium in any of the 2007–2008 World Cup races, including two DNS (did not start) in the first two races of the season at Lianhua Mountain in China. After eight World Cup races, he finished 19th in the aerials standings.

=== 2008–2009 season ===
In the 2008–2009 circuit, Grishin started with a first-place finish at Adventure Mountain in Changchun, China, but failed to reach the podium in the remaining five races. His final standing, after six races, was fifth place.

=== 2009–2010 season ===
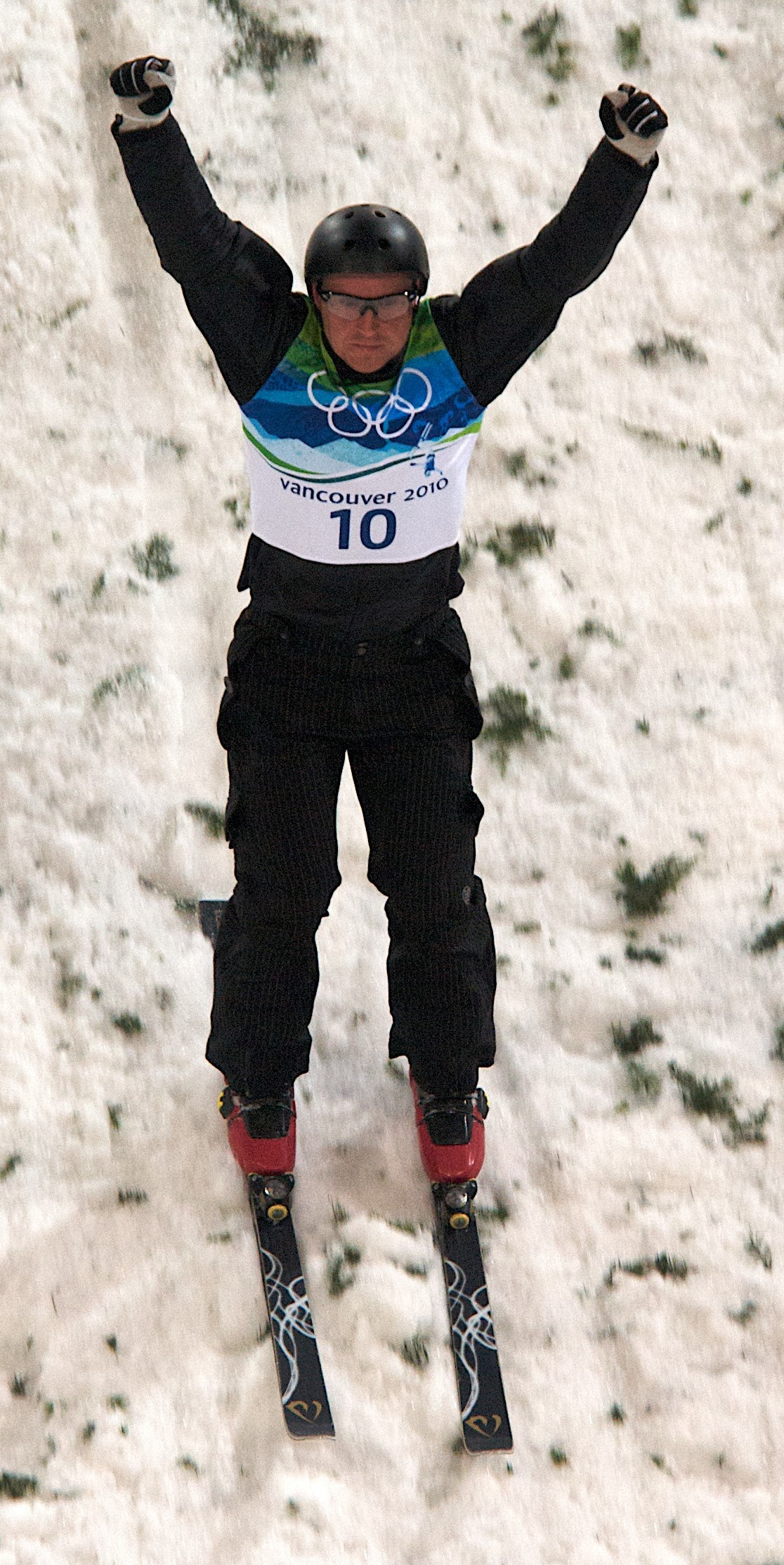
Grishin at the 2010 Winter Olympics

He placed 16th place at the 2009 Freestyle World Ski Championships.

Grishin reached the podium only once (in the Calgary race in January 2010) in the World Cup races leading up to the 2010 Winter Olympics. He participated at the Nor-Am Cup, finishing in tenth and third place.

In the qualification round of the 2010 Winter Olympics, Grishin finished seventh with 234.27 points. In the first jump of the finals, he scored 120.58 points and placed second. Grishin scored 127.83 points in his second jump for a total score of 248.41 points. Grishin beat the runner-up by 1.2 points in the finals, becoming the first athlete to win a gold medal in the Winter Olympics for Belarus.

=== 2012–2013 season ===
Grishin did not appear in the 2010–2011 and 2011–2012 World Cup races. He also did not appear in the World Ski Championships in 2011. He re-joined for the 2012–2013 World Cup but failed to finish higher than fifth place in seven races. He finished in 15th place in the aerials standing. In the following year's World Cup, he had two third-place finishes. After five races, he finished fourth in the discipline standings. He also competed in the 2013 World Ski Championships. He finished 13th and did not qualify for the finals.

=== 2014 Winter Olympics and retirement ===
He was the flag bearer for Belarus for the opening ceremony of the 2014 Sochi Olympics. In the first qualification round, he finished 20th place (second last). Placing ninth in the second qualification round, he was unable to advance to the finals. He retired from the sport after this event.

== Sale of Olympic medals ==
In July 2019, Grishin decided to put his 2010 Winter Olympics gold medal up for auction to raise money for a close individual who required a serious medical surgery. The medal was sold for US$55,000. Previously, the medal was on temporary loan and displayed in the Museum of Contemporary Belarusian Statehood in Minsk. Grishin also sold his 2002 Winter Olympics bronze medal, which garnered US$22,778.

== Personal life ==
Grishin studied at Belarusian State University of Physical Training in Minsk.

== Awards and honours ==
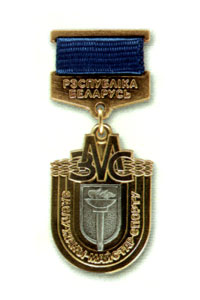
Medal for the honorary title of "Honored Master of Sports of the Republic of Belarus"

Grishin was approved as a coach by the government in 1995. He was awarded with the International Champion title in 1998 after competing in the World Cup. In 2001, he was awarded with the honorary title of Honored Master of Sports of the Republic of Belarus.

Olympic Games
Preceded by Oleg Antonenko	Flagbearer for Belarus; Sochi 2014	Succeeded by Alla Tsuper
