= FIS Freestyle World Ski Championships =

International freestyle skiing event

- Status: active
- Genre: wintersports event
- Date: January–March
- Frequency: biennial
- Country: varying
- Inaugurated: 1986

The FIS Freestyle World Ski Championships is the world championship organized by the FIS for freestyle skiing. It was first organized in 1986 and is now held every odd year. Currently, the disciplines included in the World Championships are Aerials, Moguls, Dual Moguls, Ski cross, Half-pipe, Slopestyle and Big air. Formerly, Acroski and a combined event were held.

== Editions ==
Edition	Year	Place	Country	Dates	Events **
FIS Freestyle World Ski Championships
1st	1986	Tignes	France	2–6 February	8
2nd	1989	Oberjoch	West Germany	1–5 March	8
3rd	1991	Lake Placid	United States	11–17 February	8
4th	1993	Altenmarkt	Austria	11–14 March	8
5th	1995	La Clusaz	France	6–9 February	8
6th	1997	Nagano	Japan	6–9 February	7
7th	1999	Meiringen-Hasliberg	Switzerland	10–14 March	8
8th	2001	Whistler Blackcomb	Canada	10–21 February	6
9th	2003	Deer Valley	United States	31 January – 2 February	6
10th	2005	Ruka	Finland	17–21 March	10
11th	2007	Madonna di Campiglio	Italy	5–11 March	8
12th	2009	Inawashiro	Japan	2–8 March	10
13th	2011	Deer Valley	United States	30 January – 7 February	12
14th	2013	Voss	Norway	5–10 March	12
FIS Freestyle Ski and Snowboarding World Championships *
15th	2015	Kreischberg	Austria	15–25 January	12 + 12
16th	2017	Sierra Nevada	Spain	7–19 March	12 + 14
17th	2019	Utah	United States	1–10 February	14 + 11
18th	2021	Idre	Sweden	11–13 February	2 + 3
18th	2021	Rogla	Slovenia	1–2 March	0 + 4
18th	2021	Almaty	Kazakhstan	8–11 March	7 + 0
18th	2021	Aspen	United States	10–16 March	6 + 6
19th	2023	Bakuriani	Georgia	19 February – 4 March	16 + 14
20th	2025	Engadin	Switzerland	18–30 March	16 + 14
21st	2027	Montafon	Austria		
22nd	2029	Zhangjiakou	China		

* Starting from 2015, it combined with the FIS Snowboard World Championships.
** Second numbers in italic denotes number of snowboarding events at the combined editions.

== Current events ==
=== Men's events ===
Numbers in brackets denotes number of victories in corresponding disciplines. Boldface denotes record number of victories.

==== Aerials ====
Year	Gold	Silver	Bronze
1986 Tignes	Lloyd Langlois (CAN)	Yves Laroche (CAN)	Jean-Marc Bacquin (FRA)
1989 Oberjoch	Lloyd Langlois (CAN) **(2)**	Didier Méda (FRA)	Philippe Laroche (CAN)
1991 Lake Placid	Philippe Laroche (CAN)	John Ross (CAN)	Dave Valenti (USA)
1993 Altenmarkt	Philippe Laroche (CAN) **(2)**	Richard Cobbing (GBR)	Jean-Marc Bacquin (FRA)
1995 La Clusaz	Trace Worthington (USA)	Christian Rijavec (AUT)	Sébastien Foucras (FRA)
1997 Nagano	Nicolas Fontaine (CAN)	Eric Bergoust (USA)	Andy Capicik (CAN)
1999 Meiringen-Hasliberg	Eric Bergoust (USA)	Christian Rijavec (AUT)	Joe Pack (USA)
2001 Whistler-Blackcomb	Alexei Grishin (BLR)	Dmitri Dashinski (BLR)	Joe Pack (USA)
2003 Deer Valley	Dmitry Arkhipov (RUS)	Alexei Grishin (BLR)	Steve Omischl (CAN)
2005 Ruka	Steve Omischl (CAN)	Jeff Bean (CAN)	Alexei Grishin (BLR)
2007 Madonna di Campiglio	Han Xiaopeng (CHN)	Dmitri Dashinski (BLR)	Steve Omischl (CAN)
2009 Inawashiro	Ryan St. Onge (USA)	Steve Omischl (CAN)	Warren Shouldice (CAN)
2011 Deer Valley	Warren Shouldice (CAN)	Qi Guangpu (CHN)	Anton Kushnir (BLR)
2013 Voss	Qi Guangpu (CHN)	Travis Gerrits (CAN)	Jia Zongyang (CHN)
2015 Kreischberg	Qi Guangpu (CHN) **(2)**	Alex Bowen (USA)	Maxim Gustik (BLR)
2017 Sierra Nevada	Jonathon Lillis (USA)	Qi Guangpu (CHN)	David Morris (AUS)
2019 Utah	Maxim Burov (RUS)	Oleksandr Abramenko (UKR)	Noé Roth (SUI)
2021 Almaty	(Russia) Maxim Burov (RSF) **(2)**	Christopher Lillis (USA)	(Russia) Pavel Krotov (RSF)
2023 Bakuriani	Noé Roth (SUI)	Quinn Dehlinger (USA)	Yang Longxiao (CHN)
2025 Engadin	Noé Roth (SUI) **(2)**	Quinn Dehlinger (USA)	Pirmin Werner (SUI)

Medal table

Rank	Nation	Gold	Silver	Bronze	Total
1	Canada	7	5	5	17
2	United States	4	5	3	12
3	China	3	2	2	7
4	Switzerland	2	0	2	4
5	Russia	2	0	0	2
6	Belarus	1	3	3	7
7	(Russia) Russian Ski Federation	1	0	1	2
8	Austria	0	2	0	2
9	France	0	1	3	4
10	Great Britain	0	1	0	1
10	Ukraine	0	1	0	1
12	Australia	0	0	1	1
Totals (12 entries)		**20**	**20**	**20**	**60**

==== Moguls ====
Year	Gold	Silver	Bronze
1986 Tignes	Éric Berthon (FRA)	Petsch Moser (SUI)	Martti Kellokumpu (FIN)
1989 Oberjoch	Edgar Grospiron (FRA)	Jürg Biner (SUI)	Éric Berthon (FRA)
1991 Lake Placid	Edgar Grospiron (FRA)	Bernard Brandt (SUI)	Chuck Martin (USA)
1993 Altenmarkt	Jean-Luc Brassard (CAN)	Fabien Bertrand (FRA)	Olivier Cotte (FRA)
1995 La Clusaz	Edgar Grospiron (FRA) (3)	Jean-Luc Brassard (CAN)	Sergey Shupletsov (RUS)
1997 Nagano	Jean-Luc Brassard (CAN) (2)	Stéphane Rochon (CAN)	Jesper Rönnbäck (SWE)
1999 Meiringen-Hasliberg	Janne Lahtela (FIN)	Lauri Lassila (FIN)	Sami Mustonen (FIN)
2001 Whistler-Blackcomb	Mikko Ronkainen (FIN)	Pierre-Alexandre Rousseau (CAN)	Stéphane Rochon (CAN)
2003 Deer Valley	Mikko Ronkainen (FIN) (2)	Jeremy Bloom (USA)	Toby Dawson (USA)
2005 Ruka	Nathan Roberts (USA)	Marc-André Moreau (CAN)	Dale Begg-Smith (AUS)
2007 Madonna di Campiglio	Pierre-Alexandre Rousseau (CAN)	Dale Begg-Smith (AUS)	Nathan Roberts (USA)
2009 Inawashiro	Patrick Deneen (USA)	Tapio Luusua (FIN)	Vincent Marquis (CAN)
2011 Deer Valley	Guilbaut Colas (FRA)	Alexandre Bilodeau (CAN)	Mikaël Kingsbury (CAN)
2013 Voss	Mikaël Kingsbury (CAN)	Alexandre Bilodeau (CAN)	Patrick Deneen (USA)
2015 Kreischberg	Anthony Benna (FRA)	Mikaël Kingsbury (CAN)	Alexandr Smyshlyaev (RUS)
2017 Sierra Nevada	Ikuma Horishima (JPN)	Benjamin Cavet (FRA)	Mikaël Kingsbury (CAN)
2019 Utah	Mikaël Kingsbury (CAN)	Matt Graham (AUS)	Daichi Hara (JPN)
2021 Almaty	Mikaël Kingsbury (CAN)	Benjamin Cavet (FRA)	Pavel Kolmakov (KAZ)
2023 Bakuriani	Mikaël Kingsbury (CAN) **(4)**	Matt Graham (AUS)	Walter Wallberg (SWE)
2025 Engadin	Ikuma Horishima (JPN) (2)	Mikaël Kingsbury (CAN)	Jung Dae-yoon (KOR)

Medal table

Rank	Nation	Gold	Silver	Bronze	Total
1	Canada	7	8	4	19
2	France	6	3	2	11
3	Finland	3	2	2	7
4	United States	2	1	4	7
5	Japan	2	0	1	3
6	Australia	0	3	1	4
7	Switzerland	0	3	0	3
8	Russia	0	0	2	2
8	Sweden	0	0	2	2
10	Kazakhstan	0	0	1	1
10	South Korea	0	0	1	1
Totals (11 entries)		**20**	**20**	**20**	**60**

==== Dual moguls ====
Year	Gold	Silver	Bronze
1999 Meiringen-Hasliberg	Johann Grégoire (FRA)	Janne Lahtela (FIN)	Lauri Lassila (FIN)
2001 Whistler-Blackcomb	Stéphane Yonnet (FRA)	Patrik Sundberg (SWE)	Johann Grégoire (FRA)
2003 Deer Valley	Jeremy Bloom (USA)	Yugo Tsukita (JPN)	Toby Dawson (USA)
2005 Ruka	Toby Dawson (USA)	Sami Mustonen (FIN)	Jeremy Bloom (USA)
2007 Madonna di Campiglio	Dale Begg-Smith (AUS)	Guilbaut Colas (FRA)	Ruslan Sharifullin (RUS)
2009 Inawashiro	Alexandre Bilodeau (CAN)	Nobuyuki Nishi (JPN)	Tapio Luusua (FIN)
2011 Deer Valley	Alexandre Bilodeau (CAN)	Mikaël Kingsbury (CAN)	Nobuyuki Nishi (JPN)
2013 Voss	Alexandre Bilodeau (CAN) (3)	Mikaël Kingsbury (CAN)	Patrick Deneen (USA)
2015 Kreischberg	Mikaël Kingsbury (CAN)	Philippe Marquis (CAN)	Marc-Antoine Gagnon (CAN)
2017 Sierra Nevada	Ikuma Horishima (JPN)	Bradley Wilson (USA)	Marco Tadé (SUI)
2019 Utah	Mikaël Kingsbury (CAN)	Bradley Wilson (USA)	Daichi Hara (JPN)
2021 Almaty	Mikaël Kingsbury (CAN)	Matt Graham (AUS)	Ikuma Horishima (JPN)
2023 Bakuriani	Mikaël Kingsbury (CAN)	Walter Wallberg (SWE)	Matt Graham (AUS)
2025 Engadin	Mikaël Kingsbury (CAN) **(5)**	Ikuma Horishima (JPN)	Matt Graham (AUS)

Medal table

Rank	Nation	Gold	Silver	Bronze	Total
1	Canada	8	3	1	12
2	United States	2	2	3	7
3	France	2	1	1	4
4	Japan	1	3	3	7
5	Australia	1	1	2	4
6	Finland	0	2	2	4
7	Sweden	0	2	0	2
8	Russia	0	0	1	1
8	Switzerland	0	0	1	1
Totals (9 entries)		**14**	**14**	**14**	**42**

==== Ski cross ====
Year	Gold	Silver	Bronze
2005 Ruka	Tomáš Kraus (CZE)	Jesper Brugge (SWE)	Audun Grønvold (NOR)
2007 Madonna di Campiglio	Tomáš Kraus (CZE) **(2)**	Stanley Hayer (CZE)	Enak Gavaggio (FRA)
2009 Inawashiro	Andreas Matt (AUT)	Thomas Zangerl (AUT)	Davey Barr (CAN)
2011 Deer Valley	Christopher Del Bosco (CAN)	Jouni Pellinen (FIN)	Andreas Matt (AUT)
2013 Voss	Jean-Frédéric Chapuis (FRA)	Bastien Midol (FRA)	John Teller (USA)
2015 Kreischberg	Filip Flisar (SLO)	Jean-Frédéric Chapuis (FRA)	Victor Öhling Norberg (SWE)
2017 Sierra Nevada	Victor Öhling Norberg (SWE)	Jamie Prebble (NZL)	François Place (FRA)
2019 Utah	François Place (FRA)	Brady Leman (CAN)	Kevin Drury (CAN)
2021 Idre	Alex Fiva (SUI)	François Place (FRA)	Erik Mobärg (SWE)
2023 Bakuriani	Simone Deromedis (ITA)	Florian Wilmsmann (GER)	Erik Mobärg (SWE)
2025 Engadin	Ryan Regez (SUI)	Tobias Müller (GER)	Ryō Sugai (JPN)

Medal table

Rank	Nation	Gold	Silver	Bronze	Total
1	France	2	3	2	7
2	Czech Republic	2	1	0	3
3	Switzerland	2	0	0	2
4	Sweden	1	1	3	5
5	Canada	1	1	2	4
6	Austria	1	1	1	3
7	Italy	1	0	0	1
7	Slovenia	1	0	0	1
9	Germany	0	2	0	2
10	Finland	0	1	0	1
10	New Zealand	0	1	0	1
12	Japan	0	0	1	1
12	Norway	0	0	1	1
12	United States	0	0	1	1
Totals (14 entries)		**11**	**11**	**11**	**33**

==== Half-pipe ====
Year	Gold	Silver	Bronze
2005 Ruka	Mathias Wecxsteen (FRA)	Loic Collumb-Patton (FRA)	Corey Vanular (CAN)
2007 Madonna di Campiglio	Cancelled		
2009 Inawashiro	Kevin Rolland (FRA)	Justin Dorey (CAN)	Xavier Bertoni (FRA)
2011 Deer Valley	Mike Riddle (CAN)	Kevin Rolland (FRA)	Simon Dumont (USA)
2013 Voss	David Wise (USA)	Torin Yater-Wallace (USA)	Thomas Krief (FRA)
2015 Kreischberg	Kyle Smaine (USA)	Joffrey Pollet-Villard (FRA)	Yannic Lerjen (SUI)
2017 Sierra Nevada	Aaron Blunck (USA)	Mike Riddle (CAN)	Kevin Rolland (FRA)
2019 Utah	Aaron Blunck (USA) **(2)**	Kevin Rolland (FRA)	Noah Bowman (CAN)
2021 Aspen	Nico Porteous (NZL)	Simon d'Artois (CAN)	Birk Irving (USA)
2023 Bakuriani	Brendan Mackay (CAN)	Jon Sallinen (FIN)	Alex Ferreira (USA)
2025 Engadin	Finley Melville Ives (NZL)	Nick Goepper (USA)	Alex Ferreira (USA)

Medal table

Rank	Nation	Gold	Silver	Bronze	Total
1	United States	4	2	4	10
2	France	2	4	3	9
3	Canada	2	3	2	7
4	New Zealand	2	0	0	2
5	Finland	0	1	0	1
6	Switzerland	0	0	1	1
Totals (6 entries)		**10**	**10**	**10**	**30**

==== Slopestyle ====
Year	Gold	Silver	Bronze
2011 Deer Valley	Alex Schlopy (USA)	Sam Carlson (USA)	Russell Henshaw (AUS)
2013 Voss	Tom Wallisch (USA)	James Woods (GBR)	Nick Goepper (USA)
2015 Kreischberg	Fabian Bösch (SUI)	Russell Henshaw (AUS)	Noah Wallace (USA)
2017 Sierra Nevada	McRae Williams (USA)	Gus Kenworthy (USA)	James Woods (GBR)
2019 Utah	James Woods (GBR)	Birk Ruud (NOR)	Nick Goepper (USA)
2021 Aspen	Andri Ragettli (SUI)	Colby Stevenson (USA)	Alex Hall (USA)
2023 Bakuriani	Birk Ruud (NOR)	Christian Nummedal (NOR)	Andri Ragettli (SUI)
2025 Engadin	Birk Ruud (NOR) **(2)**	Mac Forehand (USA)	Alex Hall (USA)

Medal table

Rank	Nation	Gold	Silver	Bronze	Total
1	United States	3	4	5	12
2	Norway	2	2	0	4
3	Switzerland	2	0	1	3
4	Great Britain	1	1	1	3
5	Australia	0	1	1	2
Totals (5 entries)		**8**	**8**	**8**	**24**

==== Big air ====
Year	Gold	Silver	Bronze
2019 Utah	Fabian Bösch (SUI)	Henrik Harlaut (SWE)	Alex Beaulieu-Marchand (CAN)
2021 Aspen	Oliwer Magnusson (SWE)	Édouard Therriault (CAN)	Kim Gubser (SUI)
2023 Bakuriani	Troy Podmilsak (USA)	Lukas Müllauer (AUT)	Birk Ruud (NOR)
2025 Engadin	Luca Harrington (NZL)	Elias Syrjä (FIN)	Birk Ruud (NOR)

Medal table

Rank	Nation	Gold	Silver	Bronze	Total
1	Sweden	1	1	0	2
2	Switzerland	1	0	1	2
3	New Zealand	1	0	0	1
3	United States	1	0	0	1
5	Canada	0	1	1	2
6	Austria	0	1	0	1
6	Finland	0	1	0	1
8	Norway	0	0	2	2
Totals (8 entries)		**4**	**4**	**4**	**12**

=== Women's events ===
Numbers in brackets denotes number of victories in corresponding disciplines. Boldface denotes record number of victories.

==== Aerials ====
Year	Gold	Silver	Bronze
1986 Tignes	Maria Quintana (USA)	Carin Hernskog (SWE)	Meredith Anne Gardner (CAN)
1989 Oberjoch	Catherine Lombard (FRA)	Sonja Reichart (FRG)	Melanie Palenik (USA)
1991 Lake Placid	Vasilisa Semenchuk (URS)	Elfie Simchen (GER)	Liselotte Johansson (SWE)
1993 Altenmarkt	Lina Cheryazova (UZB)	Marie Lindgren (SWE)	Kristean Porter (USA)
1995 La Clusaz	Nikki Stone (USA)	Marie Lindgren (SWE)	Kirstie Marshall (AUS)
1997 Nagano	Kirstie Marshall (AUS)	Michele Rohrbach (SUI)	Veronica Brenner (CAN)
1999 Meiringen-Hasliberg	Jacqui Cooper (AUS)	Hilde Synnoeve Lid (NOR)	Nikki Stone (USA)
2001 Whistler-Blackcomb	Veronika Bauer (CAN)	Michele Rohrbach (SUI)	Deidra Dionne (CAN)
2003 Deer Valley	Alisa Camplin (AUS)	Veronika Bauer (CAN)	Deidra Dionne (CAN)
2005 Ruka	Li Nina (CHN)	Evelyne Leu (SUI)	Guo Xinxin (CHN)
2007 Madonna di Campiglio	Li Nina (CHN)	Assoli Slivets (BLR)	Jacqui Cooper (AUS)
2009 Inawashiro	Li Nina (CHN) **(3)**	Xu Mengtao (CHN)	Jacqui Cooper (AUS)
2011 Deer Valley	Cheng Shuang (CHN)	Xu Mengtao (CHN)	Olha Volkova (UKR)
2013 Voss	Xu Mengtao (CHN)	Veronika Korsunova (RUS)	Danielle Scott (AUS)
2015 Kreischberg	Laura Peel (AUS)	Kiley McKinnon (USA)	Xu Mengtao (CHN)
2017 Sierra Nevada	Ashley Caldwell (USA)	Danielle Scott (AUS)	Xu Mengtao (CHN)
2019 Utah	Aliaksandra Ramanouskaya (BLR)	Liubov Nikitina (RUS)	Xu Mengtao (CHN)
2021 Almaty	Laura Peel (AUS) (2)	Ashley Caldwell (USA)	(Russia) Liubov Nikitina (RSF)
2023 Bakuriani	Kong Fanyu (CHN)	Danielle Scott (AUS)	Anastasiya Novosad (UKR)
2025 Engadin	Kaila Kuhn (USA)	Xu Mengtao (CHN)	Danielle Scott (AUS)

Medal table

Rank	Nation	Gold	Silver	Bronze	Total
1	China	6	3	4	13
2	Australia	5	2	5	12
3	United States	4	2	3	9
4	Canada	1	1	4	6
5	Belarus	1	1	0	2
6	France	1	0	0	1
6	Soviet Union	1	0	0	1
6	Uzbekistan	1	0	0	1
9	Sweden	0	3	1	4
10	Switzerland	0	3	0	3
11	Russia	0	2	0	2
12	Germany	0	1	0	1
12	Norway	0	1	0	1
12	West Germany	0	1	0	1
15	Ukraine	0	0	2	2
16	(Russia) Russian Ski Federation	0	0	1	1
Totals (16 entries)		**20**	**20**	**20**	**60**

==== Moguls ====
Year	Gold	Silver	Bronze
1986 Tignes	Mary Jo Tiampo (USA)	Hayley Wolff (USA)	Silvia Marciandi (ITA)
1989 Oberjoch	Raphaëlle Monod (FRA)	Donna Weinbrecht (USA)	Tatjana Mittermayer (FRG)
1991 Lake Placid	Donna Weinbrecht (USA)	Tatjana Mittermayer (GER)	Birgit Stein-Keppler (GER)
1993 Altenmarkt	Stine Lise Hattestad (NOR)	Petra Moroder (ITA)	Bronwen Thomas (CAN)
1995 La Clusaz	Candice Gilg (FRA)	Raphaelle Monod (FRA)	Tatjana Mittermayer (GER)
1997 Nagano	Candice Gilg (FRA) (2)	Donna Weinbrecht (USA)	Tatjana Mittermayer (GER)
1999 Meiringen-Hasliberg	Ann Battelle (USA)	Kari Traa (NOR)	Corinne Bodmer (SUI)
2001 Whistler-Blackcomb	Kari Traa (NOR)	Maria Despas (AUS)	Aiko Uemura (JPN)
2003 Deer Valley	Kari Traa (NOR) (2)	Michelle Roark (USA)	Stéphanie St-Pierre (CAN)
2005 Ruka	Hannah Kearney (USA)	Nikola Sudová (CZE)	Margarita Marbler (AUT)
2007 Madonna di Campiglio	Kristi Richards (CAN)	Jennifer Heil (CAN)	Deborah Scanzio (ITA)
2009 Inawashiro	Aiko Uemura (JPN)	Jennifer Heil (CAN)	Nikola Sudová (CZE)
2011 Deer Valley	Jennifer Heil (CAN)	Hannah Kearney (USA)	Kristi Richards (CAN)
2013 Voss	Hannah Kearney (USA) (2)	Miki Itō (JPN)	Justine Dufour-Lapointe (CAN)
2015 Kreischberg	Justine Dufour-Lapointe (CAN)	Hannah Kearney (USA)	Britteny Cox (AUS)
2017 Sierra Nevada	Britteny Cox (AUS)	Perrine Laffont (FRA)	Justine Dufour-Lapointe (CAN)
2019 Utah	Yuliya Galysheva (KAZ)	Jakara Anthony (AUS)	Perrine Laffont (FRA)
2021 Almaty	Perrine Laffont (FRA)	Yuliya Galysheva (KAZ)	(Russia) Anastasia Smirnova (RSF)
2023 Bakuriani	Perrine Laffont (FRA)	Jaelin Kauf (USA)	Avital Carroll (AUT)
2025 Engadin	Perrine Laffont (FRA) **(3)**	Hinako Tomitaka (JPN)	Maïa Schwinghammer (CAN)

Medal table

Rank	Nation	Gold	Silver	Bronze	Total
1	France	6	2	1	9
2	United States	5	7	0	12
3	Canada	3	2	6	11
4	Norway	3	1	0	4
5	Australia	1	2	1	4
5	Japan	1	2	1	4
7	Kazakhstan	1	1	0	2
8	Germany	0	1	3	4
9	Italy	0	1	2	3
10	Czech Republic	0	1	1	2
11	Austria	0	0	2	2
12	(Russia) Russian Ski Federation	0	0	1	1
12	Switzerland	0	0	1	1
12	West Germany	0	0	1	1
Totals (14 entries)		**20**	**20**	**20**	**60**

==== Dual moguls ====
Year	Gold	Silver	Bronze
1999 Meiringen-Hasliberg	Sandra Schmitt (GER)	Kari Traa (NOR)	Ann Battelle (USA)
2001 Whistler-Blackcomb	Kari Traa (NOR)	Corinne Bodmer (SUI)	Tami Bradley (CAN)
2003 Deer Valley	Kari Traa (NOR) (2)	Marina Cherkasova (RUS)	Shannon Bahrke (USA)
2005 Ruka	Jennifer Heil (CAN)	Kari Traa (NOR)	Aiko Uemura (JPN)
2007 Madonna di Campiglio	Jennifer Heil (CAN)	Shannon Bahrke (USA)	Margarita Marbler (AUT)
2009 Inawashiro	Aiko Uemura (JPN)	Miki Itō (JPN)	Hannah Kearney (USA)
2011 Deer Valley	Jennifer Heil (CAN) **(3)**	Chloé Dufour-Lapointe (CAN)	Hannah Kearney (USA)
2013 Voss	Chloé Dufour-Lapointe (CAN)	Miki Itō (JPN)	Hannah Kearney (USA)
2015 Kreischberg	Hannah Kearney (USA)	Justine Dufour-Lapointe (CAN)	Yuliya Galysheva (KAZ)
2017 Sierra Nevada	Perrine Laffont (FRA)	Yuliya Galysheva (KAZ)	Jaelin Kauf (USA)
2019 Utah	Perrine Laffont (FRA)	Jaelin Kauf (USA)	Tess Johnson (USA)
2021 Almaty	(Russia) Anastasia Smirnova (RSF)	(Russia) Viktoriia Lazarenko (RSF)	Anastassiya Gorodko (KAZ)
2023 Bakuriani	Perrine Laffont (FRA) **(3)**	Jaelin Kauf (USA)	Avital Carroll (AUT)
2025 Engadin	Jaelin Kauf (USA)	Tess Johnson (USA)	Anastassiya Gorodko (KAZ)

Medal table

Rank	Nation	Gold	Silver	Bronze	Total
1	Canada	4	2	1	7
2	France	3	0	0	3
3	United States	2	4	7	13
4	Norway	2	2	0	4
5	Japan	1	2	1	4
6	(Russia) Russian Ski Federation	1	1	0	2
7	Germany	1	0	0	1
8	Kazakhstan	0	1	3	4
9	Russia	0	1	0	1
9	Switzerland	0	1	0	1
11	Austria	0	0	2	2
Totals (11 entries)		**14**	**14**	**14**	**42**

==== Ski cross ====
Year	Gold	Silver	Bronze
2005 Ruka	Karin Huttary (AUT)	Magdelina Iljans (SWE)	Ophélie David (FRA)
2007 Madonna di Campiglio	Ophélie David (FRA)	Méryll Boulangeat (FRA)	Alexandra Grauvogl (GER)
2009 Inawashiro	Ashleigh McIvor (CAN)	Karin Huttary (AUT)	Méryll Boulangeat (FRA)
2011 Deer Valley	Kelsey Serwa (CAN)	Julia Murray (CAN)	Anna Holmlund (SWE)
2013 Voss	Fanny Smith (SUI)	Marielle Thompson (CAN)	Ophélie David (FRA)
2015 Kreischberg	Andrea Limbacher (AUT)	Ophélie David (FRA)	Fanny Smith (SUI)
2017 Sierra Nevada	Sandra Näslund (SWE)	Fanny Smith (SUI)	Ophélie David (FRA)
2019 Utah	Marielle Thompson (CAN)	Fanny Smith (SUI)	Alizée Baron (FRA)
2021 Idre	Sandra Näslund (SWE)	Fanny Smith (SUI)	Alizée Baron (FRA)
2023 Bakuriani	Sandra Näslund (SWE) **(3)**	Katrin Ofner (AUT)	Fanny Smith (SUI)
2025 Engadin	Fanny Smith (SUI) (2)	Courtney Hoffos (CAN)	Daniela Maier (GER)

Medal table

Rank	Nation	Gold	Silver	Bronze	Total
1	Canada	3	3	0	6
2	Sweden	3	1	1	5
3	Switzerland	2	3	2	7
4	Austria	2	2	0	4
5	France	1	2	6	9
6	Germany	0	0	2	2
Totals (6 entries)		**11**	**11**	**11**	**33**

==== Half-pipe ====
Year	Gold	Silver	Bronze
2005 Ruka	Sarah Burke (CAN)	Kristi Leskinen (USA)	Grethe Eliassen (NOR)
2007 Madonna di Campiglio	Cancelled		
2009 Inawashiro	Virginie Faivre (SUI)	Megan Gunning (CAN)	Jen Hudak (USA)
2011 Deer Valley	Rosalind Groenewoud (CAN)	Jen Hudak (USA)	Keltie Hansen (CAN)
2013 Voss	Virginie Faivre (SUI)	Anaïs Caradeux (FRA)	Ayana Onozuka (JPN)
2015 Kreischberg	Virginie Faivre (SUI) **(3)**	Cassie Sharpe (CAN)	Mirjam Jäger (SUI)
2017 Sierra Nevada	Ayana Onozuka (JPN)	Marie Martinod (FRA)	Devin Logan (USA)
2019 Utah	Kelly Sildaru (EST)	Cassie Sharpe (CAN)	Brita Sigourney (USA)
2021 Aspen	Eileen Gu (CHN)	Rachael Karker (CAN)	Zoe Atkin (GBR)
2023 Bakuriani	Hanna Faulhaber (USA)	Zoe Atkin (GBR)	Rachael Karker (CAN)
2025 Engadin	Zoe Atkin (GBR)	Li Fanghui (CHN)	Cassie Sharpe (CAN)

Medal table

Rank	Nation	Gold	Silver	Bronze	Total
1	Switzerland	3	0	1	4
2	Canada	2	4	3	9
3	United States	1	2	3	6
4	Great Britain	1	1	1	3
5	China	1	1	0	2
6	Japan	1	0	1	2
7	Estonia	1	0	0	1
8	France	0	2	0	2
9	Norway	0	0	1	1
Totals (9 entries)		**10**	**10**	**10**	**30**

==== Slopestyle ====
Year	Gold	Silver	Bronze
2011 Deer Valley	Anna Segal (AUS)	Kaya Turski (CAN)	Keri Herman (USA)
2013 Voss	Kaya Turski (CAN)	Dara Howell (CAN)	Grete Eliassen (USA)
2015 Kreischberg	Lisa Zimmermann (GER)	Katie Summerhayes (GBR)	Zuzana Stromková (SVK)
2017 Sierra Nevada	Tess Ledeux (FRA)	Emma Dahlström (SWE)	Isabel Atkin (GBR)
2019 Utah	Cancelled		
2021 Aspen	Eileen Gu (CHN)	Mathilde Gremaud (SUI)	Megan Oldham (CAN)
2023 Bakuriani	Mathilde Gremaud (SUI)	Megan Oldham (CAN)	Johanne Killi (NOR)
2025 Engadin	Mathilde Gremaud (SUI) **(2)**	Lara Wolf (AUT)	Megan Oldham (CAN)

Medal table

Rank	Nation	Gold	Silver	Bronze	Total
1	Switzerland	2	1	0	3
2	Canada	1	3	2	6
3	Australia	1	0	0	1
3	China	1	0	0	1
3	France	1	0	0	1
3	Germany	1	0	0	1
7	Great Britain	0	1	1	2
8	Austria	0	1	0	1
8	Sweden	0	1	0	1
10	United States	0	0	2	2
11	Norway	0	0	1	1
11	Slovakia	0	0	1	1
Totals (12 entries)		**7**	**7**	**7**	**21**

==== Big air ====
Year	Gold	Silver	Bronze
2019 Utah	Tess Ledeux (FRA)	Julia Krass (USA)	Isabel Atkin (GBR)
2021 Aspen	(Russia) Anastasia Tatalina (RSF)	(Russia) Lana Prusakova (RSF)	Eileen Gu (CHN)
2023 Bakuriani	Tess Ledeux (FRA) **(2)**	Sandra Eie (NOR)	Megan Oldham (CAN)
2025 Engadin	Flora Tabanelli (ITA)	Sarah Höfflin (SUI)	Anni Kärävä (FIN)

Medal table

Rank	Nation	Gold	Silver	Bronze	Total
1	France	2	0	0	2
2	(Russia) Russian Ski Federation	1	1	0	2
3	Italy	1	0	0	1
4	Norway	0	1	0	1
4	Switzerland	0	1	0	1
4	United States	0	1	0	1
7	Canada	0	0	1	1
7	China	0	0	1	1
7	Finland	0	0	1	1
7	Great Britain	0	0	1	1
Totals (10 entries)		**4**	**4**	**4**	**12**

=== Mixed events ===
Numbers in brackets denotes number of victories in corresponding disciplines. Boldface denotes record number of victories.

==== Team aerials ====
Year	Gold	Silver	Bronze
2019 Utah	Carol Bouvard; Nicolas Gygax; Noé Roth; Switzerland	Xu Mengtao; Sun Jiaxu; Wang Xindi; China	Liubov Nikitina; Stanislav Nikitin; Maxim Burov; Russia
2021 Almaty	Liubov Nikitina; Pavel Krotov; Maxim Burov (Russia) Russian Ski Federation	Carol Bouvard; Pirmin Werner; Noé Roth; Switzerland	Ashley Caldwell; Eric Loughran; Christopher Lillis; United States
2023 Bakuriani	Ashley Caldwell; Christopher Lillis; Quinn Dehlinger; United States	Kong Fanyu; Li Tianma; Yang Longxiao; China	Anastasiya Novosad; Oleksandr Okipniuk; Dmytro Kotovskyi; Ukraine
2025 Engadin	Kaila Kuhn; Quinn Dehlinger **(2)**; Christopher Lillis **(2)**; United States	Anhelina Brykina; Oleksandr Okipniuk; Dmytro Kotovskyi; Ukraine	Lina Kozomara; Noé Roth; Pirmin Werner; Switzerland

Medal table

Rank	Nation	Gold	Silver	Bronze	Total
1	United States	2	0	1	3
2	Switzerland	1	1	1	3
3	(Russia) Russian Ski Federation	1	0	0	1
4	China	0	2	0	2
5	Ukraine	0	1	1	2
6	Russia	0	0	1	1
Totals (6 entries)		**4**	**4**	**4**	**12**

==== Team ski cross ====
Year	Gold	Silver	Bronze
2023 Bakuriani	David Mobärg; Sandra Näslund; Sweden	Reece Howden; Marielle Thompson; Canada	Federico Tomasoni; Jole Galli; Italy
2025 Engadin	Ryan Regez; Fanny Smith; Switzerland	Melvin Tchiknavorian; Jade Grillet Aubert; France	Yanick Gunsch; Jole Galli; Italy

Medal table

Rank	Nation	Gold	Silver	Bronze	Total
1	Sweden	1	0	0	1
1	Switzerland	1	0	0	1
3	Canada	0	1	0	1
3	France	0	1	0	1
5	Italy	0	0	2	2
Totals (5 entries)		**2**	**2**	**2**	**6**

== Discontinued events ==
=== Men's events ===
Numbers in brackets denotes number of victories in corresponding disciplines. Boldface denotes record number of victories.

==== Acroski ====
Year	Gold	Silver	Bronze
1986 Tignes	Richard Schabl (FRG)	Lane Spina (USA)	Georg Fürmeier (FRG)
1989 Oberjoch	Hermann Reitberger (FRG)	Lane Spina (USA)	Dave Walker (CAN)
1991 Lake Placid	Lane Spina (USA)	Roberto Franco (ITA)	Dave Valenti (CAN)
1993 Altenmarkt	Fabrice Becker (FRA)	Rune Kristiansen (NOR)	Lane Spina (USA)
1995 La Clusaz	Rune Kristiansen (NOR)	Fabrice Becker (FRA)	Heini Baumgartner (SUI)
1997 Nagano	Fabrice Becker (FRA) **(2)**	Ian Edmondson (USA)	Heini Baumgartner (SUI)
1999 Meiringen-Hasliberg	Ian Edmondson (USA)	Mike McDonald (CAN)	Heini Baumgartner (SUI)

Medal table

Rank	Nation	Gold	Silver	Bronze	Total
1	United States	2	3	1	6
2	France	2	1	0	3
3	West Germany	2	0	1	3
4	Norway	1	1	0	2
5	Canada	0	1	2	3
6	Italy	0	1	0	1
7	Switzerland	0	0	3	3
Totals (7 entries)		**7**	**7**	**7**	**21**

==== Combined ====
Year	Gold	Silver	Bronze
1986 Tignes	Alain Laroche (CAN)	John Witt (USA)	Éric Laboureix (FRA)
1989 Oberjoch	Chris Simboli (CAN)	Scott Ogren (USA)	Marti Rafel (ESP)
1991 Lake Placid	Sergey Shupletsov (URS)	Jeff Viola (CAN)	Youri Gilg (FRA)
1993 Altenmarkt	Sergey Shupletsov (RUS) **(2)**	Trace Worthington (USA)	Hugo Bonatti (AUT)
1995 La Clusaz	Trace Worthington (USA)	Darcy Downs (CAN)	Jonny Moseley (USA)
1997 Nagano	Darcy Downs (CAN)	Toben Sutherland (CAN)	Oleg Kouleshov (BLR)

Medal table

Rank	Nation	Gold	Silver	Bronze	Total
1	Canada	3	3	0	6
2	United States	1	3	1	5
3	Russia	1	0	0	1
3	Soviet Union	1	0	0	1
5	France	0	0	2	2
6	Austria	0	0	1	1
6	Belarus	0	0	1	1
6	Spain	0	0	1	1
Totals (8 entries)		**6**	**6**	**6**	**18**

=== Women's events ===
Numbers in brackets denotes number of victories in corresponding disciplines. Boldface denotes record number of victories.

==== Acroski ====
Year	Gold	Silver	Bronze
1986 Tignes	Jan Bucher (USA)	Christine Rossi (FRA)	Lucie Barma (CAN)
1989 Oberjoch	Jan Bucher (USA) **(2)**	Conny Kissling (SUI)	Lucie Barma (CAN)
1991 Lake Placid	Ellen Breen (USA)	Jan Bucher (USA)	Cathy Féchoz (FRA)
1993 Altenmarkt	Ellen Breen (USA) **(2)**	Sharon Petzold (USA)	Cathy Féchoz (FRA)
1995 La Clusaz	Elena Batalova (RUS)	Ellen Breen (USA)	Annika Johansson (SWE)
1997 Nagano	Oksana Kushenko (RUS)	Åsa Magnusson (SWE)	Annika Johansson (SWE)
1999 Meiringen-Hasliberg	Natalia Razumovskaya (RUS)	Oksana Kushenko (RUS)	Annika Johansson (SWE)

Medal table

Rank	Nation	Gold	Silver	Bronze	Total
1	United States	4	3	0	7
2	Russia	3	1	0	4
3	Sweden	0	1	3	4
4	France	0	1	2	3
5	Switzerland	0	1	0	1
6	Canada	0	0	2	2
Totals (6 entries)		**7**	**7**	**7**	**21**

==== Combined ====
Year	Gold	Silver	Bronze
1986 Tignes	Conny Kissling (SUI)	Anna Fraser (CAN)	Silvia Marciandi (ITA)
1989 Oberjoch	Melanie Palenik (USA)	Conny Kissling (SUI)	Meredith Anne Gardner (CAN)
1991 Lake Placid	Maja Schmid (SUI)	Conny Kissling (SUI)	Kristean Porter (USA)
1993 Altenmarkt	Katherina Kubenk (CAN)	Nataliya Orekhova (RUS)	Kristean Porter (USA)
1995 La Clusaz	Kristean Porter (USA)	Maja Schmid (SUI)	Katherina Kubenk (CAN)

Medal table

Rank	Nation	Gold	Silver	Bronze	Total
1	Switzerland	2	3	0	5
2	United States	2	0	2	4
3	Canada	1	1	2	4
4	Russia	0	1	0	1
5	Italy	0	0	1	1
Totals (5 entries)		**5**	**5**	**5**	**15**

== Medal table ==
Table updated after the 2025 Championships.

Rank	Nation	Gold	Silver	Bronze	Total
1	Canada	43	42	38	123
2	United States	39	39	40	118
3	France	28	21	22	71
4	Switzerland	18	17	14	49
5	China	11	8	7	26
6	Australia	8	9	11	28
7	Norway	8	8	5	21
8	Sweden	6	10	10	26
9	Japan	6	7	8	21
10	Russia	6	5	4	15
11	(Russia) Russian Ski Federation	4	2	3	9
12	Austria	3	7	6	16
13	Finland	3	7	5	15
14	New Zealand	3	1	0	4
15	Germany	2	4	5	11
16	Belarus	2	4	4	10
16	Great Britain	2	4	4	10
18	Italy	2	2	5	9
19	Czech Republic	2	2	1	5
20	West Germany	2	1	2	5
21	Soviet Union	2	0	0	2
22	Kazakhstan	1	2	4	7
23	Estonia	1	0	0	1
23	Slovenia	1	0	0	1
23	Uzbekistan	1	0	0	1
26	Ukraine	0	2	3	5
27	Slovakia	0	0	1	1
27	South Korea	0	0	1	1
27	Spain	0	0	1	1
Totals (29 entries)		204	204	204	612

== Multiple medalists ==
Boldface denotes active freestyle skiers and highest medal count among all freestyle skiers (including these who not included in these tables) per type.

=== Men ===
Rank	Freestyle skier	Country	Discipline(s)	From	To	Gold	Silver	Bronze	Total
1	Mikaël Kingsbury	Canada	Dual moguls & Moguls	2011	2025	**9**	**4**	2	**15**
2	Alexandre Bilodeau	Canada	Dual moguls & Moguls	2009	2013	3	2	–	5
3	**Noé Roth**	Switzerland	Aerials & Mixed team aerials	2019	2025	3	1	2	6
4	**Ikuma Horishima**	Japan	Moguls & Dual moguls	2017	2025	3	1	1	5
5	**Maxim Burov**	Russia; Russian Ski Federation	Aerials & Mixed team aerials	2019	2021	3	–	1	4
6	Edgar Grospiron	France	Moguls	1989	1995	3	–	–	3
7	**Quinn Dehlinger**	United States	Mixed team aerials & Aerials	2023	2025	2	2	–	4
7	Qi Guangpu	China	Aerials	2011	2017	2	2	–	4
9	**Birk Ruud**	Norway	Slopestyle & Big air	2019	2025	2	1	2	5
10	**Christopher Lillis**	United States	Mixed team aerials & Aerials	2021	2025	2	1	1	4

=== Women ===
Rank	Freestyle skier	Country	Discipline(s)	From	To	Gold	Silver	Bronze	Total
1	**Perrine Laffont**	France	Moguls & Dual moguls	2017	2025	**6**	1	1	**8**
2	Kari Traa	Norway	Dual moguls & Moguls	1999	2005	4	3	–	7
3	Jennifer Heil	Canada	Dual moguls & Moguls	2007	2011	4	2	–	6
4	**Sandra Näslund**	Sweden	Ski cross & Mixed team ski cross	2017	2023	4	–	–	4
5	**Fanny Smith**	Switzerland	Ski cross & Mixed team ski cross	2013	2025	3	3	2	**8**
6	Hannah Kearney	United States	Moguls & Dual moguls	2005	2015	3	2	**3**	**8**
7	Virginie Faivre	Switzerland	Halfpipe	2009	2015	3	–	–	3
7	**Tess Ledeux**	France	Big air & Slopestyle	2017	2023	3	–	–	3
7	Li Nina	China	Aerials	2005	2009	3	–	–	3
10	**Ashley Caldwell**	United States	Aerials & Mixed team aerials	2017	2023	2	1	1	4

== See also ==
- FIS Freestyle Ski World Cup
- Freestyle skiing at the Winter Olympics
- List of Olympic medalists in freestyle skiing
- FIS Freestyle Junior World Ski Championships
