= FIS Freestyle World Ski Championships 2001 =

The 2001 FIS Freestyle World Ski Championships were held between January 17 to January 21 at the Whistler-Blackcomb ski resort in British Columbia near Vancouver, British Columbia, Canada. The World Championships featured both men's and women's events in the Moguls, Aerials and Dual Moguls.

== Results ==
The moguls and aerials events held qualifying rounds and finals. Men's and Women's qualifying and final rounds were held on the same day with two days in between the qualifying and final rounds of each sex. The Dual Moguls event for both sexes held only a finals round.

=== Men's results ===
==== Moguls ====
The men's quarterfinals took place on January 17 followed by the finals on January 19.

Medal	Name	Nation	Result
1st place, gold medalist(s)	Mikko Ronkainen	Finland	28.09
2nd place, silver medalist(s)	Pierre-Alexandre Rousseau	Canada	27.33
3rd place, bronze medalist(s)	Stephane Rochon	Canada	27.22

==== Aerials ====
The men's quarterfinals took place on January 18 followed by the finals on January 20.

Medal	Name	Nation	Result
1st place, gold medalist(s)	Alexei Grishin	Belarus	259.65
2nd place, silver medalist(s)	Dmitri Dashinski	Belarus	257.98
3rd place, bronze medalist(s)	Joe Pack	United States	251.20

==== Dual Moguls ====
The men's finals took place on January 21.

Medal	Name	Nation
1st place, gold medalist(s)	Stephane Yonnet	France
2nd place, silver medalist(s)	Patrik Sundberg	Sweden
3rd place, bronze medalist(s)	Johann Gregoire	France

=== Women's results ===
==== Moguls ====
The women's quarterfinals took place on January 17 followed by the finals on January 19.

Medal	Name	Nation	Result
1st place, gold medalist(s)	Kari Traa	Norway	28.09
2nd place, silver medalist(s)	Maria Despas	Australia	27.33
3rd place, bronze medalist(s)	Aiko Uemura	Japan	27.22

==== Aerials ====
The women's quarterfinals took place on January 18 followed by the finals on January 20.

Medal	Name	Nation	Result
1st place, gold medalist(s)	Veronika Bauer	Canada	259.65
2nd place, silver medalist(s)	Michele Rohrbach	Switzerland	257.98
3rd place, bronze medalist(s)	Deidra Dionne	Canada	251.20

==== Dual Moguls ====
The women's finals took place on January 21.

Medal	Name	Nation
1st place, gold medalist(s)	Kari Traa	Norway
2nd place, silver medalist(s)	Corinne Bodmer	Switzerland
3rd place, bronze medalist(s)	Tami Bradley	Canada
