= Dale Begg-Smith =

Australian-Canadian freestyle skier (born 1985)

Dale Begg-Smith OAM
Personal information
- Born: 18 January 1985 (age 41) Vancouver, British Columbia, Canada
- Height: 186 cm (6 ft 1 in)
- Weight: 75 kg (165 lb)

Sport
- Country: Australia
- Sport: Freestyle skiing
- Event: Moguls

World Cup career
- Seasons: 10 (2001, 2004–2010, 2014)
- Indiv. podiums: 29
- Indiv. wins: 18
- Overall titles: 1 (2007)
- Discipline titles: 4 (2006, 2007, 2008 and 2010)
Medal record
Men's Moguls skiing
Representing Australia
Olympic Games
Gold medal – first place	2006 Turin	Moguls
Silver medal – second place	2010 Vancouver	Moguls
FIS Freestyle World Ski Championships
Gold medal – first place	2007 Madonna di Campiglio	Dual moguls
Silver medal – second place	2007 Madonna di Campiglio	Moguls
Bronze medal – third place	2005 Ruka	Moguls
- Updated on 26 February 2026

Dale Begg-Smith OAM (born 18 January 1985) is an Australian-Canadian businessman and former Olympic freestyle skier. Begg-Smith won the gold medal for Australia in the men's moguls event at the 2006 Winter Olympics and silver at the 2010 Winter Olympics.

== Early years ==
Begg-Smith formed an internet company when he was 13 years old. He was skiing for his native Canada as a teenager when his coaches told him he was spending too much time on his successful business and not enough time in training.

So Begg-Smith quit the Canadian ski program and, along with his brother Jason Begg-Smith, moved to Australia at age 16 to live with his cousin Nicole. The brothers chose to ski for Australia because the country had a smaller ski program that offered them more attention and flexibility to successfully manage their business.

The brothers stayed out of competitive skiing for three years and instead trained with the Australian team, living in Jindabyne, New South Wales each winter. The pair qualified for Australian citizenship, in 2003–04, after three years and were then free to compete for their adopted country.

== Career ==
Begg-Smith is one of only nine Australians to win a gold medal in a Winter Games and the youngest to win an Olympic Gold in the history of men's freestyle mogul skiing.

In the lead-up to the 2006 Winter Games, Dale Begg-Smith won three World Cup rounds and was ranked world number one in the moguls' discipline.

Begg-Smith holds the record for qualifying for the most consecutive World Cup finals in events he entered. In March 2010, he reached his 48th consecutive final. His fourth World Cup title in 2010 also put him even with French Skier Edgar Grospiron for most World Cup wins.

Begg-Smith won silver at the 2010 Winter Olympics held in his native Vancouver, leading to some complaints about biased-judging from members of the Australian coaching staff. "Sometimes you're in the good graces of the judges, sometimes you're not," Gold medalist Alex Bilodeau said. "Judged sports can't be perfect. It can be a bad part of my sport. I see it. But everybody is going to be equal in the end."

Begg-Smith represented Australia at the 2014 Winter Olympics in Sochi, reaching the 2nd qualifying round.

== Personal ==
Begg-Smith is considered a recluse by many, and has repeatedly refused to communicate with non-Australian media, Canadian media in particular. NBC dubbed him "the most mysterious man of the Winter Olympics" in a piece aired on 14 February 2010, during the Vancouver games.

Alisa Monk, coordinator of the moguls program, said that she booked Begg-Smith's hotels and flights economically, despite his wealth. "Wherever the team stays, he stays. There are certainly no big demands. You wouldn't know he had a bit of money." She also said, "When he is at Perisher he stays in the same hut as the other mogul skiers and his brother."

After the 2010 Haiti earthquake, Begg-Smith donated his prize money – about $13,670 – to earthquake relief efforts in Haiti.

== Business controversy ==
There are claims that Begg-Smith's internet advertising business, Ads CPM later called CPM Media, had been linked to the distribution of malware. The Sydney Morning Herald reported that "a trail of digital fingerprints scattered over the web... shows Mr Begg-Smith's long and rewarding involvement in the distribution of "malicious software". Begg-Smith's manager, David Malina, said reports about his client's business had been "exaggerated", and that "it's not really something that he's involved with anymore ... he's minimised his involvement to concentrate on his sport."

== Honours ==
On 21 February 2006, Australia Post issued a postage stamp commemorating Begg-Smith's achievement, saying his gold put him in a "small and honoured group of athletes". In 2005, he was awarded Ski and Snowboard Australia's Snowsports Athlete of the Year. In 2026, inducted into the Sport Australia Hall of Fame as an athlete member.

== Results ==
=== Winter Olympic Games ===
As of 26 February 2026

Year	Age	Moguls
(Italy) 2006 Turin	21	1
(Canada) 2010 Vancouver	25	2
(Russia) 2014 Sochi	29	25

=== World Championships ===
As of 26 February 2026

Year	Age	Moguls	Dual Moguls
(Finland) 2005 Ruka	20	3	5
(Italy) 2007 Madonna di Campiglio	22	2	1

=== World Cup results by season ===
As of 26 February 2026

Season	Moguls			Dual Moguls			Overall Moguls (Note: 2001 season did not include Dual Moguls events towards Overall Mogul ranking points)					Overall Freestyle skiing	
Season	Events started	Wins	Pods	Events started	Wins	Pods	Events started	Wins	Pods	Points	Rank	Points	Rank
2000–01	2/7	0	0	0/1	0	0	2/8	0	0	32	41	8.00	77
2003–04	9/12	0	0	2/2	0	0	11/12	0	0	153	18	11.00	75
2004–05	11/11	0	3	—N/a	—N/a	—N/a	11/11	0	3	478	2nd place, silver medalist(s)	43.00	7
2005–06	11/11	6	8	—N/a	—N/a	—N/a	11/11	6	8	821	1st place, gold medalist(s)	75.00	2nd place, silver medalist(s)
2006–07	7/7	4	5	3/3	2	2	10/10	6	7	784	1st place, gold medalist(s)	78.00	1st place, gold medalist(s)
2007–08	9/9	3	4	1/1	0	1	10/10	3	5	664	1st place, gold medalist(s)	66.00	3rd place, bronze medalist(s)
2008–09	3/7	0	0	1/2	0	0	4/9	0	0	147	18	16.00	58
2009–10	10/10	3	6	—N/a	—N/a	—N/a	10/10	3	6	693	1st place, gold medalist(s)	69.00	3rd place, bronze medalist(s)
2010–11	1/6	0	0	0/5	0	0	1/11	0	0	40	35	4.00	126
2013–14	4/8	0	0	0/3	0	0	4/11	0	0	118	23	11.00	114
Total	67	16	26	7	2	3	74	18	29	–	–	–	–

=== World Cup podiums ===
As of 26 February 2026

- Podiums: 29
  - (gold) First – 18
  - (silver) Second – 8
  - (bronze) Third – 3

No	Season	Date	Location	Discipline	Place
29	2010	18 March 2010	Sierra Nevada, Spain	Moguls	Silver
28	2010	21 January 2010	(United States) Lake Placid, New York, USA	Moguls	Silver
27	2010	16 January 2010	(United States) Deer Valley, Utah, USA	Moguls	Silver
26	2010	14 January 2010	(United States) Deer Valley, Utah, USA	Moguls	Gold
25	2010	9 January 2010	Calgary, Alberta, Canada	Moguls	Gold
24	2010	8 January 2010	Calgary, Alberta, Canada	Moguls	Gold
23	2008	8 March 2008	Åre, Sweden	Dual Moguls	Silver
22	2008	7 March 2008	Åre, Sweden	Moguls	Gold
21	2008	16 February 2008	Inawashiro, Japan	Moguls	Gold
20	2008	20 January 2008	(United States) Lake Placid, New York, USA	Moguls	Gold
19	2008	18 January 2008	(United States) Lake Placid, New York, USA	Moguls	Silver
18	2007	3 March 2007	Voss, Norway	Moguls	Gold
17	2007	2 March 2007	Voss, Norway	Moguls	Gold
16	2007	24 February 2007	Apex, British Columbia, Canada	Moguls	Gold
15	2007	18 February 2007	Inawashiro, Japan	Dual Moguls	Gold
14	2007	6 February 2007	La Plagne, France	Dual Moguls	Gold
13	2007	5 February 2007	La Plagne, France	Moguls	Bronze
12	2007	6 January 2007	Mont Gabriel, Quebec, Canada	Moguls	Gold
11	2006	18 March 2006	Apex, British Columbia, Canada	Moguls	Gold
10	2006	1 March 2006	(South Korea) Jisan Forest Resort, Korea	Moguls	Gold
9	2006	4 February 2006	(Czech Republic) Spindleruv Mlyn, Czechia	Moguls	Silver
8	2006	28 January 2006	Madonna di Campiglio, Italy	Moguls	Gold
7	2006	22 January 2006	(United States) Lake Placid, New York, USA	Moguls	Gold
6	2006	20 January 2006	(United States) Lake Placid, New York, USA	Moguls	Gold
5	2006	13 January 2006	(United States) Deer Valley, Utah, USA	Moguls	Bronze
4	2006	18 December 2005	Oberstdorf, Bavaria, Germany	Moguls	Gold
3	2005	11 February 2005	Naeba, Japan	Moguls	Bronze
2	2005	5 February 2005	Inawashiro, Japan	Moguls	Silver
1	2005	29 January 2005	(United States) Deer Valley, Utah, USA	Moguls	Silver
