= Freestyle skiing at the 2006 Winter Olympics =

Freestyle skiing at the XX Olympic Winter Games
- Venue: Sauze d'Oulx
- Dates: 11–23 February
- Competitors: 119 from 22 nations

Four freestyle skiing events were held at the 2006 Winter Olympics in Turin, at the venue in Sauze d'Oulx. There were both men's and women's competition in both aerials and moguls events. In moguls, the athletes ski down a slope littered with moguls, attempting to get down in as fast a time as possible while also attempting to get points for technique and their two aerial jumps during the course. The aerials events consisted of two jumps, which were judged by air, form and landing.

== Medal summary ==
=== Medal table ===
Rank	Nation	Gold	Silver	Bronze	Total
1	China	1	1	0	2
2	Australia	1	0	1	2
3	Canada	1	0	0	1
3	Switzerland	1	0	0	1
5	Belarus	0	1	0	1
5	Finland	0	1	0	1
5	Norway	0	1	0	1
8	France	0	0	1	1
8	Russia	0	0	1	1
8	United States	0	0	1	1
Totals (10 entries)		4	4	4	12

=== Men’s events ===
Event	Gold		Silver		Bronze	
moguls	Dale Begg-Smith; Australia	26.77	Mikko Ronkainen; Finland	26.62	Toby Dawson; United States	26.30
aerials	Han Xiaopeng; China	250.77	Dmitri Dashinski; Belarus	248.68	Vladimir Lebedev; Russia	246.76

=== Women’s events ===
Event	Gold		Silver		Bronze	
moguls	Jennifer Heil; Canada	26.50	Kari Traa; Norway	25.65	Sandra Laoura; France	25.37
aerials	Evelyne Leu; Switzerland	202.55	Li Nina; China	197.39	Alisa Camplin; Australia	191.39

== Participating NOCs ==
Twenty-two nations contributed freestyle skiers to the events at Torino.

- Argentina (1)
- Australia (9)
- Austria (1)
- Belarus (6)
- Canada (14)
- China (8)
- Czech Republic (3)
- Spain (1)
- Finland (4)
- France (5)
- Germany (2)
- Italy (6)
- Japan (9)
- Kazakhstan (3)
- South Korea (1)
- Norway (2)
- Russia (13)
- Slovenia (2)
- Sweden (4)
- Switzerland (4)
- Ukraine (7)
- United States (14)
