= Alexandra Grauvogl =

German freestyle skier (born 1981)

Personal information
- Nationality: German
- Born: 16 November 1981 (age 44) Tegernsee, Germany

Sport
- Country: Germany
- Sport: Freestyle skiing
Medal record
Women's freestyle skiing
Representing Germany
World Championships
Bronze medal – third place	2007 Madonna di Campiglio	Ski cross

Alexandra Grauvogl (born 16 November 1981) is a German freestyle skier.

She won a bronze medal in ski cross at the FIS Freestyle World Ski Championships 2007. She also competed at the 2005 and 2009 world championships.
