= Corinne Bodmer =

Swiss freestyle skier (born 1970)

Personal information
- Nationality: Swiss
- Born: 23 September 1970 (age 55) Lausanne, Switzerland

Sport
- Country: Switzerland
- Sport: Freestyle skiing
Medal record
Women's freestyle skiing
Representing Switzerland
World Championships
Silver medal – second place	2001 Whistler-Blackcomb	Dual moguls
Bronze medal – third place	1999 Meiringen-Hasliberg	Moguls

Corinne Bodmer (born 23 September 1970) is a Swiss freestyle skier. She was born in Lausanne. She competed at the 1998 and 2002 Winter Olympics, in women's moguls.
