= Jennifer Heil =

Canadian freestyle skier (born 1983)

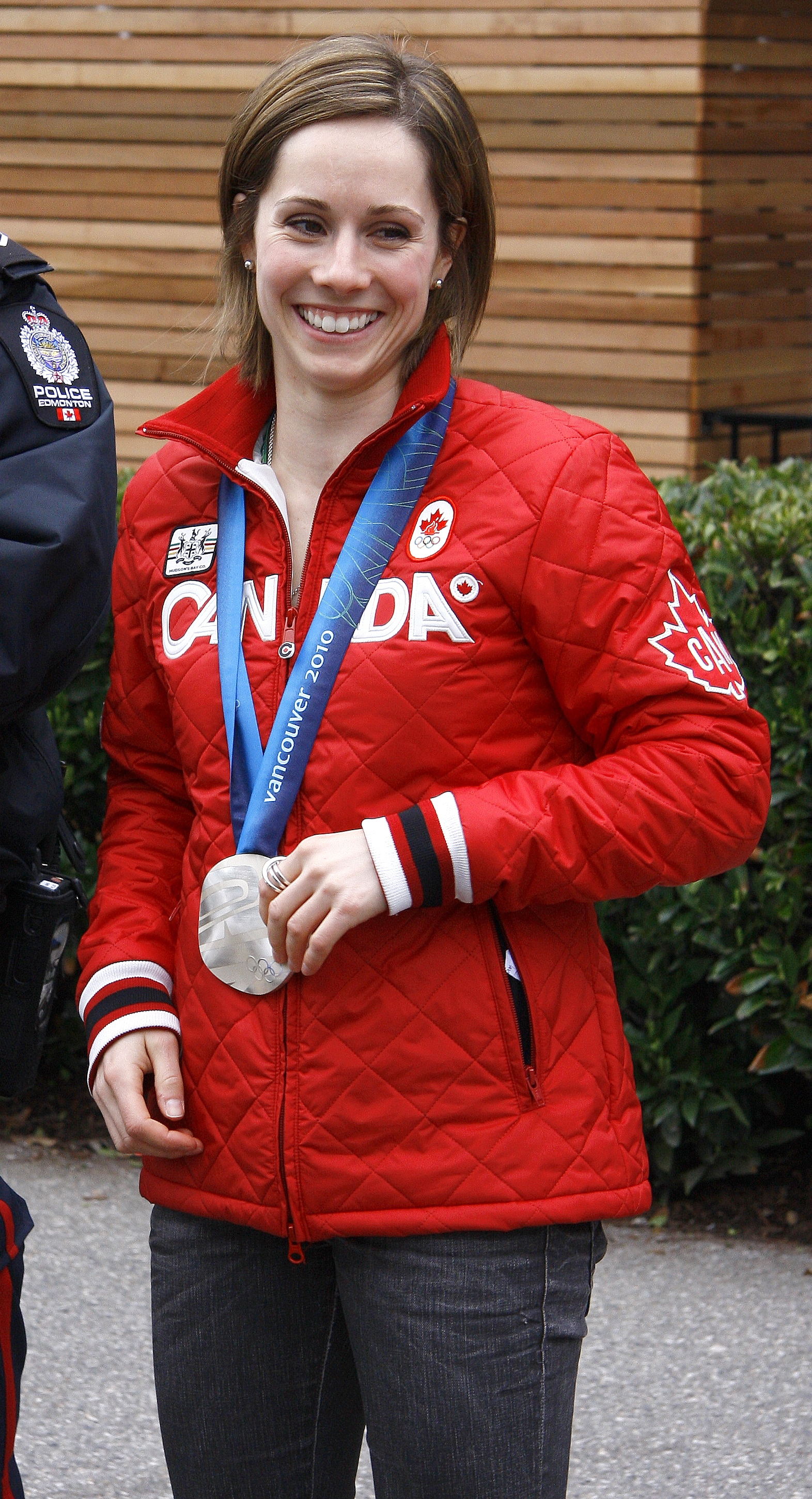
- Heil with her 2010 Winter Olympics silver medal

Personal information
- Born: April 11, 1983 (age 43) Spruce Grove, Alberta, Canada
- Height: 1.63 m (5 ft 4 in)
- Website: www.jenniferheil.com

Skiing career
- Sport: Alpine skiing
- Retired: 2011
- Disciplines: Freestyle skiing, Moguls
- World Cup debut: May 12, 1999 (age 16)

Olympics
- Teams: 3 (2002–2010)
- Medals: 2 (1 gold)

World Championships
- Teams: 5 (2001, 2005-2011)
- Medals: 6 (4 gold)

World Cup
- Seasons: 9 (2001–2002, 2004–2007, 2009–2011)
- Wins: 25
- Podiums: 58
- Overall titles: 1 (2007)
- Discipline titles: 6 - 5x Moguls (2004-2007, 2010), 1x Dual Moguls (2007)
Medal record
International freestyle ski competitions
Event	1st	2nd	3rd
Olympic Games	1	1	0
World Championships	4	2	0
Total	5	3	0
Women's freestyle skiing
Olympic Games
Gold medal – first place	2006 Turin	Moguls
Silver medal – second place	2010 Vancouver	Moguls
FIS Freestyle World Ski Championships
Gold medal – first place	2007 Italy	Dual moguls
Gold medal – first place	2009 Inawashiro	Dual moguls
Gold medal – first place	2011 Deer Valley	Moguls
Gold medal – first place	2011 Deer Valley	Dual moguls
Silver medal – second place	2007 Italy	Moguls
Silver medal – second place	2009 Inwashiro	Moguls

Jennifer Heil (born April 11, 1983) is a Canadian freestyle skier from Spruce Grove, Alberta. Heil started skiing at age two. Jennifer Heil won the first gold medal for Canada in the 2006 Winter Olympics games in Turin, Italy and a silver medal at the 2010 Winter Olympics in Vancouver, which was also Canada's first medal in those games. Jennifer held the Guinness World Record for most gold medals won at a World Championship. She has four world championship titles in total and two silver medals from the Worlds as well. Over her career, Heil became the first mogul skier to complete the "Grand Slam" winning all major titles in the sport including a record-tying five overall FIS World Cup Crystal Globe titles. Jennifer is a member of the Canadian Order of Sport, Alberta Sports Hall of Fame and Pantheon des Sports du Québec, inducted as the winningest female skier in Canadian history.

Heil is recognized for her leadership contributions to various sectors, notably in sport development and public safety policy. During her tenure at viaSport British Columbia, as a member of the executive team, she designed and led the development of the BC Safe Sport Framework resulting in policy development and an independent organization to uphold safety in sport. Heil also co-founded B2ten, an athlete-centered organization to advance sporting excellence. Throughout her career, Heil has garnered numerous accolades and leadership awards including the Meritorious Service Decorations awarded by the Governor General of Canada and AthletesCAN Leadership Award in recognition of her distinguished service to the sports sector.

Heil is involved with several charitable organisations including the Because I am a Girl program by Plan International. During the 2010 Winter Olympics, Heil made a significant donation to Because I am a Girl and kicked off a million dollar fundraising goal resulting in the education of over 630,000 girls and women.

== Career ==
=== Early career ===
Heil competed in her first Olympics at the 2002 Winter Olympics at the age of 18, finishing fourth in the moguls, just one-hundredth of a point out of a bronze medal. She took the 2002–03 season off due to injury, and then won the World Cup in 2003–04, 2004–05 and 2005–06. Heil then won the first gold medal for Canada in the 2006 Winter Olympics in Turin, Italy. Giving Canada its first victory on the first full day of competition, Heil placed her title in the moguls event. Following the Olympics, Heil completed the season by winning her fourth straight World Cup title.

=== B2ten ===
Jennifer Heil engaged in extensive experimental training in order to prepare for the Olympic Games. She worked with one of Canada's leading sports psychologists, a strength trainer, and an athletic therapist daily. After winning in 2006, Jennifer expressed her desire to build a program that would offer the same kind of support she got to other athletes in Canada. JD Miller and her coach Dominick Gauthier helped her build B2ten who now raised tens of millions of dollars and has supported 100s of athletes across summer and winter Olympic Games.

=== 2010 Vancouver Olympics ===
Going into the 2010 Olympics, Heil won the last 4 2009–10 Freestyle Skiing World Cup events that she entered. She opted out of the last event before the games to give her fellow countrymen an opportunity to qualify for the games. The women's moguls qualifications began in unfavourable weather conditions with rain, sleet, and slushy conditions on the course. Heil finished the qualification in second place, meaning she ran second-to-last in the final. In the final Heil had a successful and fast run which put her in first place with one skier yet to go. Heil sat, watched, and waited as Hannah Kearney of the US had her final run. Kearney finished first and displaced Heil for both the gold and as Olympic champion.

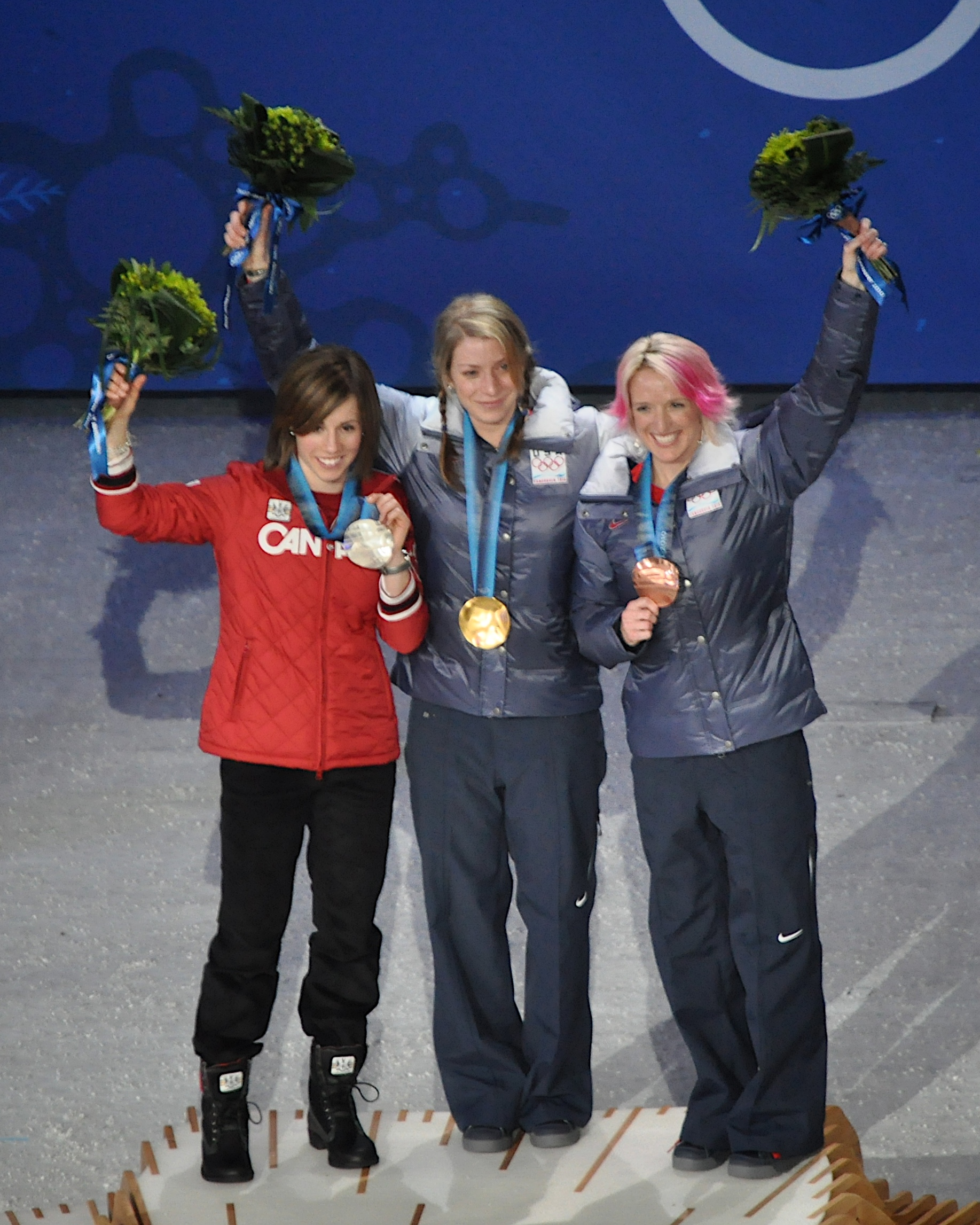
Heil standing on the podium with the other women's moguls medalists

Heil was visibly distraught as she had extensive pressure to win the gold medal. Many journalists said that it was Heil and the Canadian men's hockey team that faced the most pressure to perform at the Games, but that they had the benefit of facing the pressure as a team. Heil had gone into the event as the reigning Olympic champion and favourite not only to win the gold, but Canada's first gold medal during a Canadian hosted Olympics ever. In reference to the experience, Heil said "there is no doubt that the pressure was beyond intense." Heil's B2ten company was founded in part to win the first gold at home and assist fellow Canadians in their quest for medals. The honour of winning the first home-soil Olympic gold medal would go to Alexandre Bilodeau the next day on Sunday, February 14. Although Heil herself did not win it, Bilodeau's victory deserves some credit from Heil as he is a sponsored B2ten athlete and Heil's training partner . The next day Heil was seen on television celebrating her silver medal. She went on to say that she did not lose the gold but won the silver medal and was celebrating on stage at the medal ceremony.

According to CTV an average of about 6.6 million and a peak of 8 million Canadians tuned into their television to watch Heil try and break the gold medal slump. More Canadians watched Heil try to win gold than the 6 million that had watched the New Orleans Saints win Super Bowl XLIV.

Following her 2010 Olympics silver medal win at the Cypress Mountain venue near Vancouver, Heil went on to say that this would likely be her last games. Heil said that she wants to win a third world championship next year in 2011, following that she would like to get on with her post-mogul career. She also stated that she plans to continue her work in philanthropy. Following the 2010 Olympics Heil again made a donation of $25,000, this time to Because I am a Girl, an organization that helps lift girls out of poverty. Heil said of her donation that "I’ve had the power in my hands to help and many young girls don’t have that same power. We want to make this Canada’s most giving Games ever." Alexandre Bilodeau also made a donation but he made his to the Canadian Association of Pediatric Health Centres for cerebral palsy. They both went on to encourage others to give saying that they have the ability to give back and if others were to help in their own way it would make a difference.

=== Finishing her career ===
During January of the 2010–11 World Cup season, Heil officially announced her retirement prior to the Canadian stop at the Canada Olympic Park in Calgary. Heil would say of her retirement that "I'm definitely in good shape. I could go for one more Olympic Games. I'm still at the top of my game, but for me I feel it's an important time to build on my future. I want to be as successful off the slopes as I have been on the slopes and I feel that time is now. I feel that in my heart."

Heil's next event was at the 2011 FIS World Championships. In her last event there in the moguls final, Heil won her first ever gold medal and first ever medal having previously won only in the dual moguls event. Heil said of her win there that "It's a title I've never won before and there's been a lot of discussion about that in Canada. I've never been one to count my medals and count my titles, but I'm pretty happy that that conversation is over." For the last day of the World Championships, Heil competed in the dual moguls event. There she advanced to the final where she defeated young teammate Chloé Dufour-Lapointe to win her second gold medal of the competition. The victory was her third successive dual moguls crown, more importantly it ensured that Heil would end her career as a double world champion. As a result of her dual championship golds she was awarded the Canadian Press's female athlete of the year for 2011.

== Post-Olympic career ==
Heil is founder and CEO of RYA Health, a healthtech company she started while attending the Stanford Graduate School of Business. Jennifer is also a graduate of Desautels Faculty of Management of McGill University in management and political science. In her spare time, Heil is an avid surfer and sport commentator with CBC Television.

In 2025, Heil was named Team Canada's Chef de Mission for the 2026 Winter Olympic Games in Milano Cortina, Italy by the Canadian Olympic Committee.
