= FIS Freestyle World Ski Championships 2003 =

The 2003 FIS Freestyle World Ski Championships were held between January 31 and February 2 at the Deer Valley ski resort in northern Utah near Park City, United States. The World Championships featured both men's and women's events in the Moguls, Aerials and Dual Moguls.

== Results ==
The moguls and aerials events held qualifying rounds and finals. Men's and Women's qualifying and final rounds were held on the same day with two days in between the qualifying and final rounds of each sex. The Dual Moguls event for both sexes held only a finals round.

=== Men's results ===
==== Moguls ====
The men's quarterfinals took place on January 29 followed by the finals on January 31.

Medal	Name	Nation	Result
1st place, gold medalist(s)	Mikko Ronkainen	Finland	28.09
2nd place, silver medalist(s)	Jeremy Bloom	United States	27.33
3rd place, bronze medalist(s)	Toby Dawson	United States	27.22

==== Aerials ====
The men's quarterfinals took place on January 30 followed by the finals on February 2.

Medal	Name	Nation	Result
1st place, gold medalist(s)	Dimitri Arkhipov	Russia	259.65
2nd place, silver medalist(s)	Alexei Grishin	Belarus	257.98
3rd place, bronze medalist(s)	Steve Omischl	Canada	251.20

==== Dual Moguls ====
The men's finals took place on February 2.

Medal	Name	Nation
1st place, gold medalist(s)	Jeremy Bloom	United States
2nd place, silver medalist(s)	Yugo Tsukita	Japan
3rd place, bronze medalist(s)	Toby Dawson	United States

=== Women's results ===
==== Moguls ====
The women's finals were held on January 31.

Medal	Name	Nation	Result
1st place, gold medalist(s)	Kari Traa	Norway	27.99
2nd place, silver medalist(s)	Michelle Roark	United States	27.13
3rd place, bronze medalist(s)	Stephanie St. Pierre	Canada	26.46

==== Aerials ====
The women's finals were held on February 1.

Medal	Name	Nation	Result
1st place, gold medalist(s)	Alisa Camplin	Australia	207.31
2nd place, silver medalist(s)	Veronika Bauer	Canada	204.47
3rd place, bronze medalist(s)	Deidra Dionne	Canada	192.05

==== Dual Moguls ====
The women's finals were held on February 1.

Medal	Name	Nation
1st place, gold medalist(s)	Kari Traa	Norway
2nd place, silver medalist(s)	Marina Cherkasova	Russia
3rd place, bronze medalist(s)	Shannon Bahrke	United States
