= Ultrasport =

Norwegian extreme sports magazine

Ultrasport was a Norwegian extreme sports magazine. The magazine was started in 1991. In 2001 the magazine published nude photos of Kari Traa, which caused public outcry in Norway. In 2006 the magazine was acquired by Cicero Norway AS. It ceased publication in 2008.
