= Justin Dorey =

Canadian freestyle skier

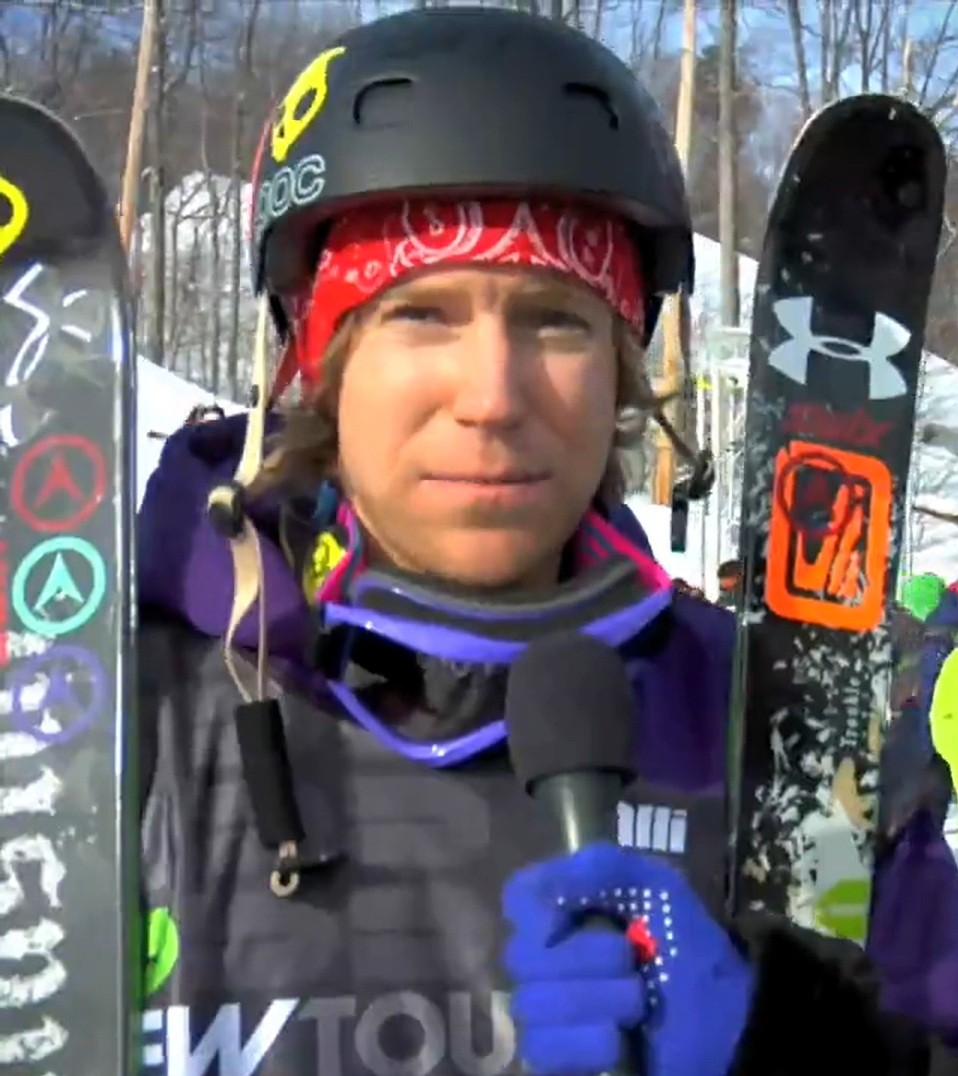
- Dorey in 2009

Personal information
- Born: August 17, 1988 (age 37) Calgary, Alberta
- Height: 5 ft 11 in (180 cm)
- Weight: 180 lb (82 kg)
Medal record
Men's Freestyle skiing
Representing Canada
FIS Freestyle World Ski Championships
| Silver medal – second place | 2009 Inawashiro | Halfpipe |

Justin Dorey (born August 17, 1988) is a Canadian freestyle skier. He won the silver medal in the halfpipe at the 2009 FIS Freestyle World Ski Championships. Dorey represented Canada at the 2014 Winter Olympics in the halfpipe event.
