= FIS Freestyle World Ski Championships 2007 =

2007 edition of the FIS Freestyle World Ski Championships

The 2007 FIS Freestyle World Ski Championships were held in Madonna di Campiglio, Italy, from March 5th-11th. Five events were supposed to be held for each sex, but the half-pipe was canceled.

== Results ==
=== Men's results ===
==== Skicross ====
Medal	Name	Nation	Qualification Time (Seeding)
1st place, gold medalist(s)	Tomáš Kraus	Czech Republic	52.03 (3)
2nd place, silver medalist(s)	Stanley Hayer	Czech Republic	52.47 (12)
3rd place, bronze medalist(s)	Enak Gavaggio	France	53.11 (25)

==== Moguls ====
Medal	Name	Nation	Score
1st place, gold medalist(s)	Pierre-Alexandre Rousseau	Canada	27.17
2nd place, silver medalist(s)	Dale Begg-Smith	Australia	26.65
3rd place, bronze medalist(s)	Nathan Roberts	United States	26.63

==== Dual moguls ====
Medal	Name	Nation	Qualification Score (seeding)
1st place, gold medalist(s)	Dale Begg-Smith	Australia	26.13 (1)
2nd place, silver medalist(s)	Guilbaut Colas	France	25.94 (2)
3rd place, bronze medalist(s)	Ruslan Sharifullin	Russia	25.16 (5)

==== Aerials ====
Medal	Name	Nation	Score
1st place, gold medalist(s)	Han Xiaopeng	China	240.86
2nd place, silver medalist(s)	Dmitri Dashinski	Belarus	236.42
3rd place, bronze medalist(s)	Steve Omischl	Canada	235.81

=== Women's results ===
==== Skicross ====
Medal	Name	Nation	Qualification Time (Seeding)
1st place, gold medalist(s)	Ophelie David	France	54.94 (1)
2nd place, silver medalist(s)	Méryll Boulangeat	France	56.03 (3)
3rd place, bronze medalist(s)	Alexandra Grauvogl	Germany	56.29 (4)

==== Moguls ====
Medal	Name	Nation	Score
1st place, gold medalist(s)	Kristi Richards	Canada	25.37
2nd place, silver medalist(s)	Jennifer Heil	Canada	25.25
3rd place, bronze medalist(s)	Deborah Scanzio	Italy	25.12

==== Dual moguls ====
Medal	Name	Nation	Qualification Score (seeding)
1st place, gold medalist(s)	Jennifer Heil	Canada	25.80 (1)
2nd place, silver medalist(s)	Shannon Bahrke	United States	25.74 (2)
3rd place, bronze medalist(s)	Margarita Marbler	Austria	25.55 (3)

==== Aerials ====
Medal	Name	Nation	Score
1st place, gold medalist(s)	Li Nina	China	188.05
2nd place, silver medalist(s)	Assoli Slivets	Belarus	186.55
3rd place, bronze medalist(s)	Jacqui Cooper	Australia	182.58
