= Aiko Uemura =

Japanese freestyle skier

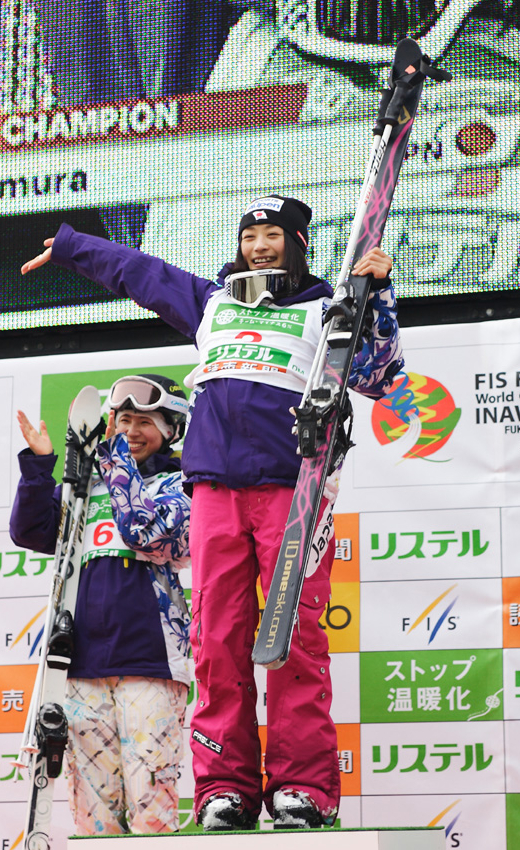

Personal information
- Born: Itami, Hyōgo Prefecture, Japan
- Height: 156 cm (5 ft 1 in)
- Weight: 49 kg (108 lb)

Sport
- Country: Japan
- Sport: Freestyle skiing
Medal record
Representing Japan
FIS Freestyle World Ski Championships
Gold medal – first place	2009 Inawashiro	Moguls
Gold medal – first place	2009 Inawashiro	Dual Moguls
Bronze medal – third place	2001 Whistler	Moguls
Bronze medal – third place	2005 Ruka	Dual Moguls

Aiko Uemura (上村 愛子, Uemura Aiko) is a Japanese freestyle skier. She competed in moguls and dual moguls events at the world level from 1998 until her retirement in 2014.

== Biography ==
Uemura was born December 9, 1979, in Itami. Her family moved to Hakuba town, Nagano Prefecture, in 1986. She graduated from Hakuba High School in 1998, and works for the Kitano Construction Corporation in Nagano city, Japan.

She is the first Japanese woman to win the 2007–08 World Cup in moguls. She also won two gold medals at FIS Freestyle World Ski Championships 2009. She took part in the Winter Olympic Games and World Championship events in 1998, 2002, 2006, 2010, and 2014. At the 2014 Sochi Olympics, she was beaten for bronze by Hannah Kearney, the previous Olympic champion.

"Uemura is treated like a rock star in Japan," noted a Canadian newspaper in 2009. "In training, there are upwards of 100 Japanese journalists and photographers waiting at the bottom of the hill." In June 2009, she married alpine skier Kentaro Minagawa.
