= Méryll Boulangeat =

French freestyle skier (born 1986)

Personal information
- Nationality: French
- Born: 6 September 1986 (age 39)

Sport
- Country: France
- Sport: Freestyle skiing
Medal record
Women's freestyle skiing
Representing France
World Championships
Silver medal – second place	2007 Madonna di Campiglio	Ski cross
Bronze medal – third place	2009 Inawashiro	Ski cross

Méryll Boulangeat (born 6 September 1986) is a French freestyle skier.

She competed at the FIS Freestyle World Ski Championships 2007, where she won a silver medal in ski cross. She won a bronze medal in ski cross at the FIS Freestyle World Ski Championships 2009.
