= Stéphane Yonnet =

French freestyle skier

Stéphane Yonnet is a French freestyle skier born on 18 May 1976, in Caen. He moved to Tignes when he was 7 years old, where he learned how to ski.

On 21 January 2001, he took a gold medal in parallel mogul skiing at the Freestyle World Ski Championship in Whistler, Canada.

He is now a ski instructor in Tignes where he first started skiing.
