= Li Nina =

Chinese freestyle skier

Medal record

Women's freestyle skiing

Representing China

Olympic Games
Silver medal – second place	2006 Turin	Aerials
Silver medal – second place	2010 Vancouver	Aerials

FIS Freestyle World Ski Championships
Gold medal – first place	2005 Ruka	Aerials
Gold medal – first place	2007 Madonna di Campiglio	Aerials
Gold medal – first place	2009 Inawashiro	Aerials

Li Nina (Chinese: 李妮娜; pinyin: Lǐ Nīnà, born January 10, 1983, in Benxi, Liaoning) is a Chinese aerial skier who won silver at both the 2006 and 2010 Winter Olympics. She placed 5th at the 2002 Winter Olympics, and has won three World Championships in aerials.
