= Guilbaut Colas =

French Mogul skier (born 1983)

Medal record

Men's freestyle skiing

Representing France

FIS Freestyle World Ski Championships
Gold medal – first place	2011 Deer Valley	Moguls
Silver medal – second place	2007 Madonna di Campiglio	Dual moguls

Guilbaut Colas (born 18 June 1983) is a French Mogul skier who competed in the 2006 Winter Olympics and has seven World Cup victories. Born in Échirolles, Colas competed in the 2010 Winter Olympics in Men's Moguls. Although he had the best time his "air score" was not as good and he finished sixth overall.
