= Davina Williams =

Australian freestyle skier

Personal information
- Nationality: Australian
- Born: 30 November 1985 (age 39); Camperdown

Sport
- Sport: Freestyle skiing

Davina Williams (born 30 November 1985) is an Australian freestyle skier and graphic designer. She competed at the 2014 Winter Olympics in Sochi, in women's halfpipe.
