= Vincent Marquis =

Canadian freestyle skier

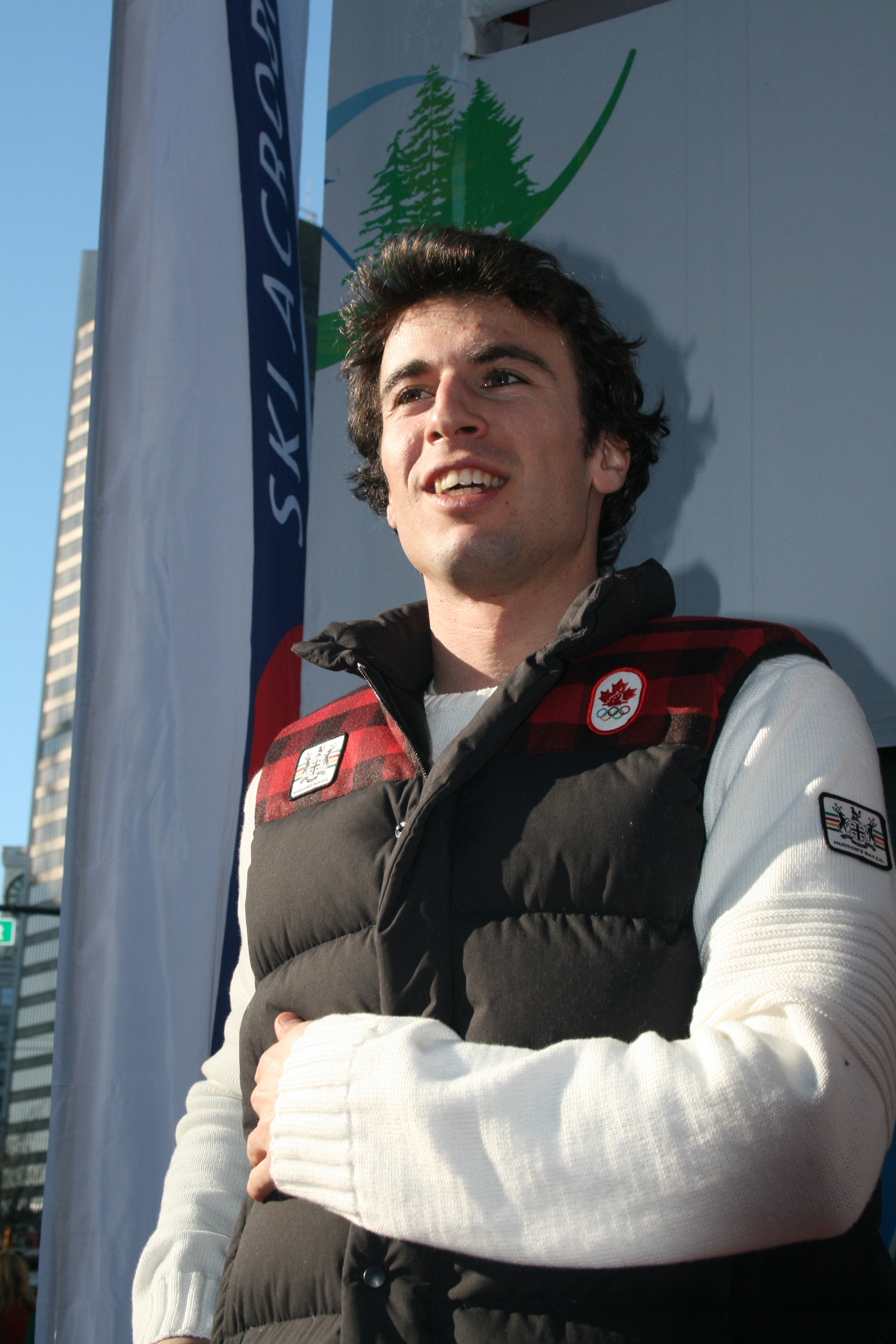
- Marquis in 2010

Personal information
- Born: April 15, 1984 (age 42) Quebec City, Quebec, Canada
- Height: 1.78 m (5 ft 10 in)
- Weight: 73 kg (161 lb; 11.5 st)

Sport
- Country: Canada
- Sport: Freestyle skiing
Medal record
Representing Canada
Men's Freestyle skiing
FIS Freestyle World Ski Championships
Bronze medal – third place	2009 Inawashiro	Moguls

Vincent Marquis (born April 15, 1984 in Quebec City, Quebec) is a Canadian freestyle skier who currently resides in Quebec City. Vincent Marquis participates in moguls.

== Skiing career ==
Marquis has been part of two historic sweeps of the medal podiums on the 2008-09 FIS Freestyle Ski World Cup tour with Alexandre Bilodeau and Pierre-Alexandre Rousseau. Marquis also managed a bronze medal at the 2009 FIS Freestyle World Skiing Championships, the only male Canadian to podium in men's moguls. A career highlight includes winning the world cup event on his home Mount Gabriel course.

Marquis was part of the freestyle squad that went to the 2010 Winter Olympics in Vancouver, British Columbia, Canada. There Marquis qualified for the final with a score of 23.71 that was good enough for 12th. In the finals Marquis had a run of 25.88 as the 8th competitor to go, Marquis remained in the top 3 until the second last competitor started. At this point fellow Canadian Alexandre Bilodeau was on the course, Bilodeau finished in first place and pushed Marquis out of the medals.

== Personal life ==
His brother Philippe Marquis is on the national development squad for men's moguls. Vincent suffered an ACL tear in his knee in 2004, the surgery was performed by his father. Vincent is currently studying physiotherapy at Laval University.
