= Deidra Dionne =

Canadian freestyle skier (born 1982)

Personal information
- Born: February 5, 1982 (age 44) North Battleford, Saskatchewan, Canada
- Website: www.deidradionne.com
Medal record
Women's freestyle skiing
Representing Canada
Olympic Games
| Bronze medal – third place | 2002 Salt Lake City | Aerials |
World Championships
| Bronze medal – third place | 2001 Whistler | Aerials |
| Bronze medal – third place | 2003 Deer Valley | Aerials |

Deidra Dionne (born February 5, 1982) is a Canadian freestyle skier. She was born in North Battleford, Saskatchewan. She won bronze in the 2002 Winter Olympics in freestyle aerial ski She also won the bronze medal at the 2001 and 2003 FIS World Freestyle Ski Championships.

Her health and career appeared in jeopardy on September 1, 2005; when she had a training accident that injured her neck. She came close to being paralyzed. She had to have surgery where two vertebrae in her neck were fused with a titanium plate. A bone graft needed to be taken from her right hip. Eventually she recovered, and was able to participate in the 2006 Winter Olympics.

At the 2002 Salt Lake City Olympics, Dionne won a bronze medal in women's aerial ski jumping.

== Personal life ==
Dionne graduated from the National Sport School in 1999, and then went on to pursue a Bachelor of Arts program through Athabasca University. After she finished her undergrad degree, Dionne studied law at the University of Ottawa. DD then went on to work at Goodmans LLP in Toronto as an Articling Student. She spent 10 months at the firm during 2013–2014. Between September 2015 and April 2018, she worked as the director of partnership and business strategy at Cimoroni & Company, a sport marketing and consulting company. In April 2018 she joined Rogers Media Inc/Sportsnet as Director of Business Affairs.
