= Dmitri Dashinski =

Belarusian freestyle skier and coach (born 1977)

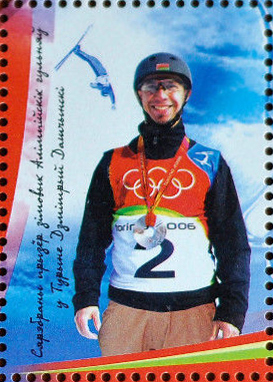
- Dashinski on a 2006 Belarusian stamp

Personal information
- Born: 9 November 1977 (age 48) Minsk, Byelorussian SSR, USSR, now Belarus
- Years active: 1995–2014
- Employer: Olympic Winter Institute of Australia

Sport
- Sport: Freestyle skiing
- Coached by: Nikolai Kozeko
- Retired: 2014
Medal record
Men's freestyle skiing
Representing Belarus
Olympic Games
Bronze medal – third place	1998 Nagano	Aerials
Silver medal – second place	2006 Turin	Aerials
World Championships
Silver medal – second place	2001 Whistler	Aerials
Silver medal – second place	2007 Madonna di Campiglio	Aerials

Dmitri Vladimirovich Daschinski (also Dzmitry Uladzimiravich Dashchynski, Belarusian: Дзмітрый Уладзіміравіч Дашчынскі; born 9 November 1977) is a Belarusian former freestyle skier and current freestyle aerials coach. He is a four-time Olympian and two-time Olympic medalist in freestyle aerials, winning bronze at the 1998 Winter Olympics in Nagano and silver at the 2006 Winter Olympics in Turin. He also placed 7th at the 2002 Winter Olympics in Salt Lake City, 11th at the 2010 Winter Olympics in Vancouver, and 8th at the 2014 Winter Olympics in Sochi in what proved to be his final Olympic appearance. As of his 2006 medal, Daschinski was the first man to have won two Olympic medals in freestyle aerials. He finished 1st in the 2006 Men's Overall World Cup standings, and won silver at both the 2001 World Ski Championships in Whistler and the 2007 World Ski Championships in Madonna di Campiglio. In 2006 he was named Belarus's Sportsman of the Year by the National Olympic Committee of the Republic of Belarus and the newspaper Sportivnaya Panorama.

Daschinski trained for most of his competitive career under long-time Belarusian national aerials coach Nikolai Kozeko, who led the Belarus freestyle team from 1993 and mentored the country's Olympic medalists in the discipline.

== Awards and honours ==
Daschinski was awarded the honorary title of Merited Master of Sport of the Republic of Belarus in 1998. He has also received Belarus's Order of Honour.

== Coaching career ==
Daschinski retired from competition in 2014. He subsequently worked as a coach with the Belarusian national aerials program alongside Kozeko, and was regarded as a potential successor to lead the national team. He later coached in Kazakhstan before joining the Olympic Winter Institute of Australia (OWIA) as Aerial Skiing Head Coach, based in Melbourne, Victoria. Daschinski has been described in Belarusian sports media as coach to Australian aerialist Danielle Scott, who won the silver medal in women's aerials at the 2026 Winter Olympics in Milano Cortina.
