= Mikko Ronkainen =

Finnish freestyle skier

Personal information
- Born: November 25, 1978 (age 47) Muurame, Finland
Medal record
Men's freestyle skiing
Representing Finland
Olympic Games
| Silver medal – second place | 2006 Turin | Moguls |
World Championships
| Gold medal – first place | 2001 Whistler | Moguls |
| Gold medal – first place | 2003 Deer Valley | Moguls |

Mikko Ronkainen (born November 25, 1978, in Muurame) is a freestyle skier from Finland. He is a two-time World Champion (2001 and 2003) and won the moguls World Cup during the 2000–2001 season. At the 2006 Winter Olympics in Turin Ronkainen won a silver medal.
