= Ruslan Sharifullin =

Russian freestyle skier

Personal information
- Nationality: Russian
- Born: 25 August 1985 (age 39); Chusovoy, Russia

Sport
- Sport: Freestyle skiing

Ruslan Sharifullin (born 25 August 1985) is a Russian freestyle skier. He competed in the men's moguls event at the 2006 Winter Olympics.
