= Tapio Luusua =

Finnish freestyle skier

Tapio Luusua (born in Pelkosenniemi on August 4, 1981) is a Finnish freestyle skier. At the FIS Freestyle World Ski Championships 2009 he received a silver medal in moguls and a bronze in dual moguls. He also competed in the 2002 Winter Olympics and competed for Finland at the 2010 Winter Olympics.
