= Pierre-Alexandre Rousseau =

Canadian freestyle skier

Personal information
- Born: October 6, 1979 (age 47) Drummondville, Quebec, Canada
- Height: 1.70 m (5 ft 7 in)
- Weight: 68 kg (150 lb; 10.7 st)

Sport
- Country: Canada
- Sport: Freestyle skiing
Medal record
Men's freestyle skiing
Representing Canada
FIS Freestyle World Ski Championships
| Gold medal – first place | 2007 Madonna di Campiglio | Moguls |
| Silver medal – second place | 2001 Whistler | Moguls |

Pierre-Alexandre Rousseau (born October 6, 1979, in Drummondville, Quebec) is a Canadian freestyle skier who currently resides in Drummondville. Pierre-Alexandre Rousseau participates in the mogul discipline.

Rousseau has been part of two historic sweeps of the medal podiums on the 2008-09 FIS Freestyle Ski World Cup tour with Alexandre Bilodeau and Vincent Marquis. Pierre-Alexandre Rousseau was the world champion at the 2007 Freestyle Ski World Championships in the moguls event. Rousseau also achieved at silver in the moguls event of the 2001 World Championships at Blackcomb.

At the age of 30, Rousseau competed in his first Olympic Games at the 2010 Winter Olympics, placing fifth. Rousseau had previously missed the 2002 Winter Olympics because of a neck injury, and was left off the team in Turin.
