= FIS Freestyle World Ski Championships 2009 =

The FIS Freestyle World Ski Championships 2009 were held between March 2 and March 8 in Inawashiro, Japan.

== Results ==
=== Men's Results ===
==== Skicross ====
Medal	Name	Nation	Qualification Time (Seeding)
1st place, gold medalist(s)	Andreas Matt	Austria	
2nd place, silver medalist(s)	Thomas Zangerl	Austria	
3rd place, bronze medalist(s)	Davey Barr	Canada	

==== Moguls ====
Medal	Name	Nation	Score
1st place, gold medalist(s)	Patrick Deneen	United States	
2nd place, silver medalist(s)	Tapio Luusua	Finland	
3rd place, bronze medalist(s)	Vincent Marquis	Canada	

==== Dual Moguls ====
Medal	Name	Nation	Qualification Score (seeding)
1st place, gold medalist(s)	Alexandre Bilodeau	Canada	
2nd place, silver medalist(s)	Nobuyuki Nishi	Japan	
3rd place, bronze medalist(s)	Tapio Luusua	Finland	

==== Aerials ====
Medal	Name	Nation	Score
1st place, gold medalist(s)	Ryan St. Onge	United States	
2nd place, silver medalist(s)	Steve Omischl	Canada	
3rd place, bronze medalist(s)	Warren Shouldice	Canada	

==== Halfpipe ====
Medal	Name	Nation	Score
1st place, gold medalist(s)	Kevin Rolland	France	
2nd place, silver medalist(s)	Justin Dorey	Canada	
3rd place, bronze medalist(s)	Xavier Bertoni	France	

=== Women's Events ===
==== Skicross ====
Medal	Name	Nation	Qualification Time (Seeding)
1st place, gold medalist(s)	Ashleigh McIvor	Canada	
2nd place, silver medalist(s)	Karin Huttary	Austria	
3rd place, bronze medalist(s)	Méryll Boulangeat	France	

==== Moguls ====
Medal	Name	Nation	Score
1st place, gold medalist(s)	Aiko Uemura	Japan	
2nd place, silver medalist(s)	Jennifer Heil	Canada	
3rd place, bronze medalist(s)	Nikola Sudová	Czech Republic	

==== Dual Moguls ====
Medal	Name	Nation	Qualification Score (seeding)
1st place, gold medalist(s)	Aiko Uemura	Japan	
2nd place, silver medalist(s)	Miki Ito	Japan	
3rd place, bronze medalist(s)	Hannah Kearney	United States	

==== Aerials ====
Medal	Name	Nation	Score
1st place, gold medalist(s)	Li Nina	China	
2nd place, silver medalist(s)	Xu Mengtao	China	
3rd place, bronze medalist(s)	Jacqui Cooper	Australia	

==== Halfpipe ====
Medal	Name	Nation	Score
1st place, gold medalist(s)	Virginie Faivre	Switzerland	
2nd place, silver medalist(s)	Megan Gunning	Canada	
3rd place, bronze medalist(s)	Jen Hudak	United States	

== Medal table ==
Place	Country				Total
1	Canada	2	4	3	9
2	Japan	2	2	0	4
3	United States	2	0	2	4
4	Austria	1	2	0	3
5	France	1	0	2	3
6	China	1	1	0	2
7	Finland	0	1	1	2
8	Switzerland	1	0	0	1
9	Australia	0	0	1	1
9	Czech Republic	0	0	1	1
