= Veronika Bauer =

Canadian freestyle skier

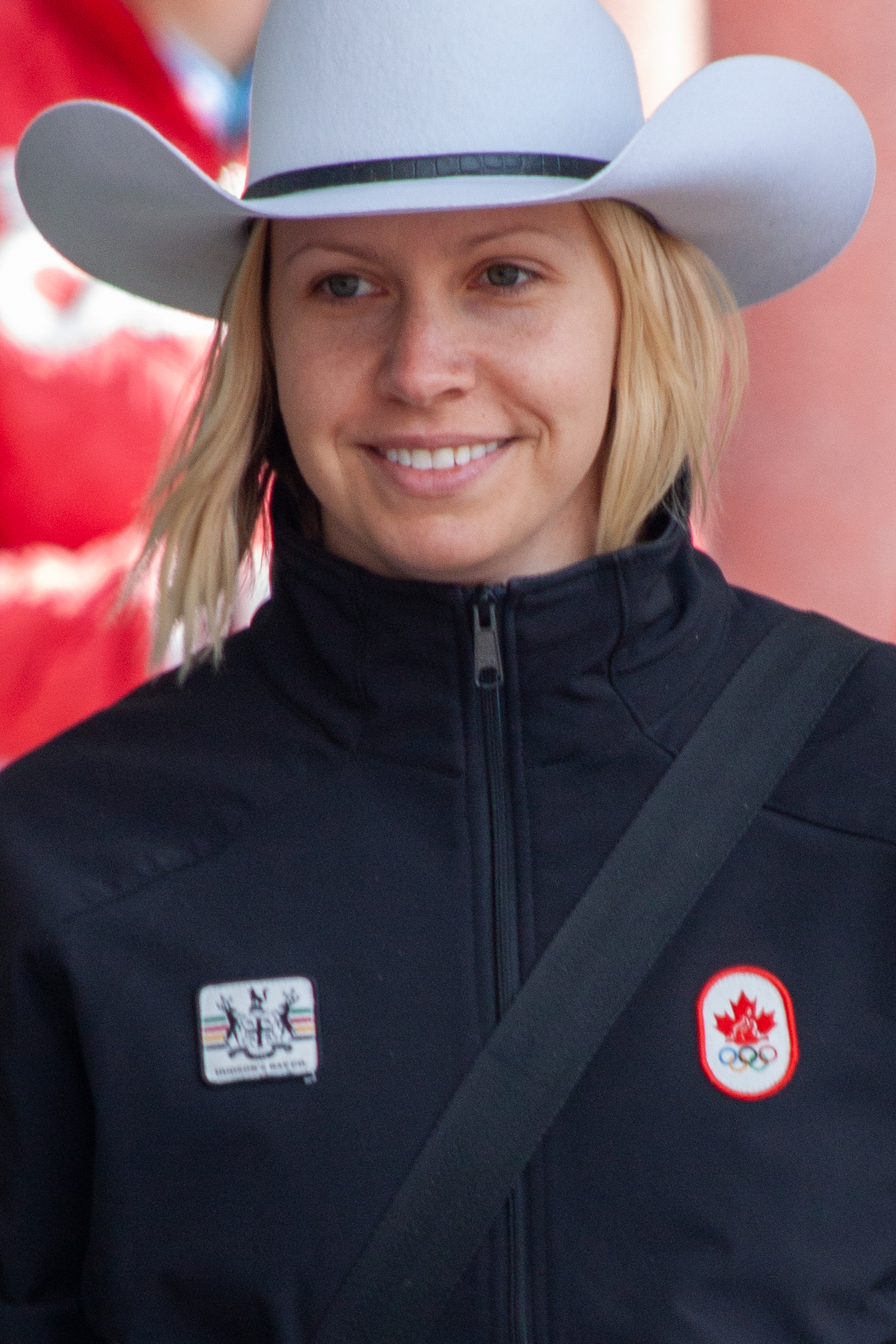
- Bauer in Parade of Champions in Calgary (2014)

Personal information
- Born: November 17, 1979 (age 46) Toronto, Ontario, Canada

Sport
- Sport: Freestyle skiing
Medal record
Women's freestyle skiing
Representing Canada
World Championships
Gold medal – first place	2001 Whistler	Aerials
Silver medal – second place	2003 Deer Valley	Aerials

Veronika Bauer (born October 17, 1979 in Toronto, Ontario) is a Canadian freestyle skier.

Bauer competes in aerials, and made her World Cup debut in August 1997 at Mount Buller in Australia. Her first World Cup podium also came at that venue, two years later. Her first career World Cup win came in 2002, when she won an event at Lake Placid.

Over her career, Bauer has placed on the podium at World Cup events 18 times, with four of these being victories. Her most successful season came in 2003, as she placed 3rd overall in the World Cup standings. That season saw her claim three of her four titles, two at Mt. Buller and one in Fernie. She has made the podium twice at the World Championships. She won a gold medal at Whistler in 2001, then finished less than three points behind Alisa Camplin to earn silver in 2003.

Bauer has competed in three Olympic games, 2002, 2006 and 2010. In the first two she made the final, with her top finish 10th place in 2002. In 2006, she finished 12th and last in the final, after qualifying in 5th place. At the 2010 event she qualified third after the first qualifying jump, but a disastrous second jump cost her a place in the finals.

== World Cup podiums ==
Date	Location	Rank
September 12, 1999	Mount Buller	3rd place, bronze medalist(s)
August 12, 2000	Mount Buller	2nd place, silver medalist(s)
August 13, 2000	Mount Buller	3rd place, bronze medalist(s)
January 12, 2002	Mont Tremblant	3rd place, bronze medalist(s)
January 18, 2002	Lake Placid	1st place, gold medalist(s)
September 7, 2002	Mount Buller	1st place, gold medalist(s)
September 8, 2002	Mount Buller	1st place, gold medalist(s)
January 26, 2003	Fernie	1st place, gold medalist(s)
February 7, 2003	Steamboat	3rd place, bronze medalist(s)
September 7, 2003	Mount Buller	2nd place, silver medalist(s)
January 25, 2004	Fernie	2nd place, silver medalist(s)
February 14, 2004	Harbin	3rd place, bronze medalist(s)
January 21, 2005	Fernie	3rd place, bronze medalist(s)
January 28, 2005	Deer Valley	2nd place, silver medalist(s)
December 18, 2005	Changchun	3rd place, bronze medalist(s)
January 14, 2006	Deer Valley	2nd place, silver medalist(s)
January 7, 2007	Mount Gabriel	3rd place, bronze medalist(s)
December 19, 2008	Adventure Mountain	3rd place, bronze medalist(s)
