= Kari Traa =

Norwegian freestyle skier

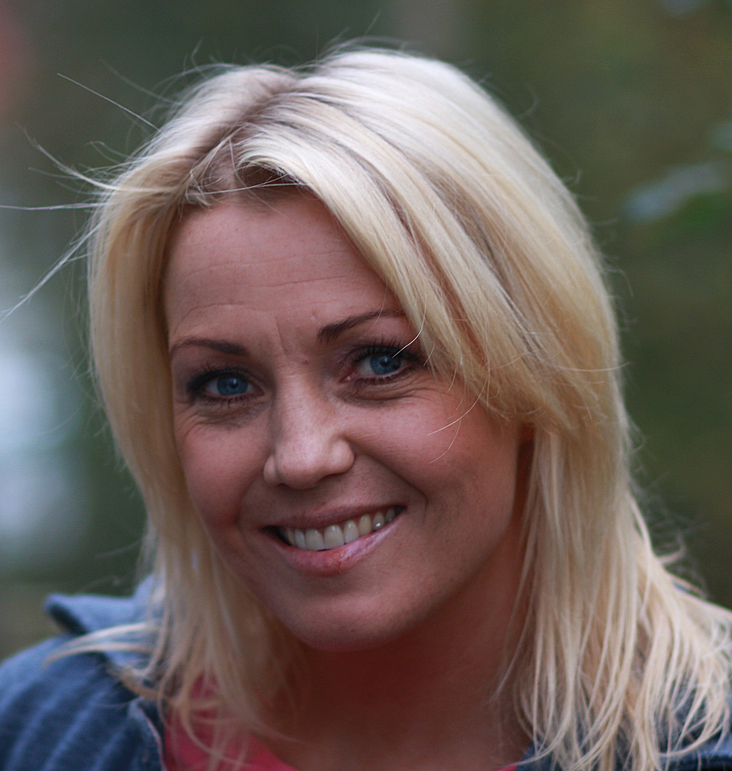
- Traa in Bjerkreim Municipality 2008

Personal information
- Born: 28 January 1974 (age 52) Voss Municipality, Norway
- Height: 168 cm (5 ft 6 in)
- Weight: 65 kg (143 lb)
Medal record
Women's freestyle skiing
Representing Norway
Olympic Games
Gold medal – first place	2002 Salt Lake City	Moguls
Silver medal – second place	2006 Turin	Moguls
Bronze medal – third place	1998 Nagano	Moguls
World Championships
Gold medal – first place	2001 Whistler	Moguls
Gold medal – first place	2001 Whistler	Dual moguls
Gold medal – first place	2003 Deer Valley	Moguls
Gold medal – first place	2003 Deer Valley	Dual moguls
Silver medal – second place	1999 Meiringen-Hasliberg	Moguls
Silver medal – second place	1999 Meiringen-Hasliberg	Dual moguls
Silver medal – second place	2005 Ruka	Dual moguls

Kari Traa (born 28 January 1974) is a Norwegian former Olympic freestyle skier. She won the Olympic title in the moguls event at the 2002 Winter Olympics, finished second at the 2006 games, and finished third at the 1998 games.

== Accomplishments ==
She is four times World Champion, from 2001 (moguls + parallel moguls) and 2003 (moguls + parallel moguls), and has also three silver medals (both moguls and parallel moguls in 1999, and moguls in 2005). She has a total of 37 World Cup victories.

Kari Traa missed the cut for the final round and finished 14th in the 1992 Winter Olympics at Albertville - the first official Olympic mogul competition. Kari did not compete when the Games came to her home country Norway and Lillehammer in 1994. She injured her knee after wiping out on a training run just three weeks before the Olympics. After the 1998 Olympics in Nagano, Japan - Kari finally had an Olympic medal when she won bronze. In subsequent Winter Olympics she gained a gold medal (2002) and silver (2006).

== Publicity ==
Traa attracted attention when she posed almost nude in a series of pictures in the sports magazine Ultrasport in 2001. She started a company in 2002, selling sports clothes, and has later won awards for successfully launching her collections. Her autobiography Kari was issued in 2006. After finishing her active career she has been engaged in recruitment of young ski talents and participated as arranger of world cup events. She is also engaged in the festival Ekstremsportveko (Extreme Sports Week) held at her home in Voss Municipality, regarded as one of the world's largest extreme sports festivals.

Kari Traa was elected "Sexiest woman in Norway" in 2002 by the magazine MANN. Her og Nå and TV 2 Nettavisen elected her as "Most sexy woman" in both 2003 and 2004. In 2007, she was second on a similar list compiled by the TV-program God kveld, Norge!

She was also mentioned as a sponsor for the Norwegian comedy duo Ylvis in a segment on their TV show I kveld med YLVIS where they tried to become "big" in Swahiliwood. Ylvis asked Traa to co-fund a movie production that had run out of money. She agreed and co-funded it with Svendsen Eksos, a local car-repair shop in Norway. In return, Traa's merchandise company was mentioned in the movie's dialogue.

In 2006 she received the Nynorsk User of the Year award.
