= Patrik Sundberg =

Swedish freestyle skier

Personal information
- Nationality: Swedish
- Born: 9 December 1975 (age 49); Österåker, Sweden

Sport
- Sport: Freestyle skiing

Patrik Sundberg (born 9 December 1975) is a Swedish freestyle skier. He competed at the 1998 Winter Olympics and the 2002 Winter Olympics.
