= 2004–05 FIS Freestyle Skiing World Cup =

Freestyle skiing competitive season

Freestyle Skiing World Cup 2004/05
Discipline	Men	Women
Overall	(United States) Jeremy Bloom	(China) Nina Li
Moguls	(United States) Jeremy Bloom	(Canada) Jennifer Heil
Aerials	(United States) Jeret Peterson	(China) Nina Li
Ski Cross	(Czech Republic) Tomáš Kraus	(France) Ophélie David
- Nations Cup: United States

Competition
Locations	19	19
Individual	29	29
Cancelled	2	2

The 2004/05 FIS Freestyle Skiing World Cup was the twenty sixth World Cup season in freestyle skiing organised by International Ski Federation. The season started on 4 September 2004 and ended on 11 March 2005. This season included three disciplines: aerials, moguls and ski cross. Halfpipe was also on schedule but all events were cancelled and so crystal globes were not awarded.

There were no dual mogul events on world cup calendar this season.

== Men ==
=== Aerials ===
Num	Season	Date	Place	Event	Winner	Second	Third
226	1	4 September 2004	(Australia) Mt. Buller	AE	(Switzerland) Martin Walti	(China) Xiaopeng Han	(Czech Republic) Aleš Valenta
227	2	5 September 2004	(Australia) Mt. Buller	AE	(Czech Republic) Aleš Valenta	(United States) Jeret Peterson	(Belarus) Dmitri Dashinski
228	3	9 January 2005	(Canada) Mont Tremblant	AE	(United States) Ryan St. Onge	(United States) Jeret Peterson	(United States) Joe Pack
229	4	14 January 2005	(United States) Lake Placid	AE	(Russia) Dmitry Arkhipov	(Canada) Warren Shouldice	(Canada) Jeff Bean
230	5	16 January 2005	(United States) Lake Placid	AE	(United States) Jeret Peterson	(Canada) Jeff Bean	(Canada) Steve Omischl
231	6	21 January 2005	(Canada) Fernie	AE	(United States) Jeret Peterson	(Ukraine) Stanislav Kravchuk	(Belarus) Aleksei Grishin
232	7	28 January 2005	(United States) Deer Valley	AE	(United States) Ryan St. Onge	(United States) Joe Pack	(Canada) Steve Omischl
233	8	5 February 2005	(China) Shenyang	AE	(United States) Jeret Peterson	(Canada) Steve Omischl	(China) Xiaopeng Han
234	9	12 February 2005	(China) Changchun	AE	(China) Sen Qui	(Canada) Steve Omischl	(Belarus) Aleksei Grishin
235	10	19 February 2005	(Italy) Sauze d'Oulx	AE	(Canada) Steve Omischl	(Canada) Kyle Nissen	(Ukraine) Stanislav Kravchuk
236	11	5 March 2005	(Czech Republic) Špindlerův Mlýn	AE	(Belarus) Dmitri Dashinski	(China) Xiaopeng Han	(Canada) Kyle Nissen
237	12	11 March 2005	(Italy) Madonna di Campiglio	AE	(Ukraine) Enver Ablaev	(United States) Jeret Peterson	(Russia) Vladimir Lebedev

=== Moguls ===
Num	Season	Date	Place	Event	Winner	Second	Third
226	1	16 December 2004	(France) Tignes	MO	(Finland) Janne Lahtela	(United States) Travis Mayer	(United States) Travis-Antone Cabral
227	2	8 January 2005	(Canada) Mont Tremblant	MO	(United States) Toby Dawson	(United States) Jeremy Bloom	(United States) Luke Westerlund
228	3	15 January 2005	(United States) Lake Placid	MO	(United States) Travis Mayer	(Finland) Mikko Ronkainen	(Canada) Marc-André Moreau
229	4	22 January 2005	(Canada) Fernie	MO	(United States) Nathan Roberts	(United States) Travis Mayer	(Russia) Ruslan Sharifullin
230	5	27 January 2005	(United States) Deer Valley	MO	(United States) Jeremy Bloom	(United States) Nathan Roberts	(United States) Toby Dawson
231	6	29 January 2005	(United States) Deer Valley	MO	(United States) Jeremy Bloom	(Australia) Dale Begg-Smith	(Finland) Janne Lahtela
232	7	5 February 2005	(Japan) Inawashiro	MO	(United States) Jeremy Bloom	(Australia) Dale Begg-Smith	(Japan) Osamu Ueno
233	8	6 February 2005	(Japan) Inawashiro	MO	(United States) Jeremy Bloom	(United States) Travis-Antone Cabral	(Japan) Hiroki Nonogaki
234	9	11 February 2005	(Japan) Naeba	MO	(United States) Jeremy Bloom	(Canada) Marc-André Moreau	(Australia) Dale Begg-Smith
235	10	18 February 2005	(Italy) Sauze d'Oulx	MO	(United States) Jeremy Bloom	(United States) Travis Mayer	(Finland) Mikko Ronkainen
236	11	26 February 2005	(Norway) Voss	MO	(Finland) Mikko Ronkainen	(United States) Jeremy Bloom	(Sweden) Fredrik Fortkord

=== Ski Cross ===
Num	Season	Date	Place	Event	Winner	Second	Third
12	1	25 October 2004	(Switzerland) Saas-Fee	SX	(Austria) Isidor Grüner	(Czech Republic) Stanley Hayer	(Japan) Hiroomi Takizawa
13	2	7 January 2005	(France) Les Contamines	SX	(Czech Republic) Tomáš Kraus	(Czech Republic) Stanley Hayer	(Austria) Isidor Grüner
14	3	15 January 2005	(Italy) Pozza di Fassa	SX	(Czech Republic) Tomáš Kraus	(France) Simon Bastelica	(Italy) Karl Heinz Molling
15	4	21 January 2005	(Austria) Kreischberg	SX	(Czech Republic) Tomáš Kraus	(Austria) Isidor Grüner	(Switzerland) Andreas Steffen
16	5	10 February 2005	(Japan) Naeba	SX	(Japan) Yukiyo Kobayashi	(Austria) Isidor Grüner	(Sweden) Lars Lewén
17	6	5 March 2005 (Note: replaces skicross event from Laax for men.)	(Switzerland) Grindelwald	SX	(France) Christian Crétier	(Czech Republic) Stanley Hayer	(Sweden) Jesper Brugge

=== Halfpipe ===
Num	Season	Date	Place	Event	Winner	Second	Third
		26 October 2004	(Switzerland) Saas-Fee	HP	cancelled		
		8 January 2005	(France) Les Contamines	HP	cancelled		

== Ladies ==
=== Aerials ===
Num	Season	Date	Place	Event	Winner	Second	Third
228	1	4 September 2004	(Australia) Mt. Buller	AE	(Australia) Lydia Ierodiaconou	(Australia) Jacqui Cooper	(Russia) Anna Zukal
229	2	5 September 2004	(Australia) Mt. Buller	AE	(Australia) Lydia Ierodiaconou	(Canada) Deidra Dionne	(China) Nina Li
230	3	9 January 2005	(Canada) Mont Tremblant	AE	(Australia) Lydia Ierodiaconou	(China) Nina Li	(Canada) Deidra Dionne
231	4	14 January 2005	(United States) Lake Placid	AE	(China) Nina Li	(Australia) Lydia Ierodiaconou	(China) Shuang Cheng
232	5	16 January 2005	(United States) Lake Placid	AE	(China) Nina Li	(Australia) Lydia Ierodiaconou	(Belarus) Alla Tsuper
233	6	21 January 2005	(Canada) Fernie	AE	(China) Shuang Cheng	(China) Nina Li	(Canada) Veronika Bauer
234	7	28 January 2005	(United States) Deer Valley	AE	(China) Nina Li	(Canada) Veronika Bauer	(Australia) Lydia Ierodiaconou
235	8	5 February 2005	(China) Shenyang	AE	(China) Xinxin Guo	(China) Nina Li	(Australia) Lydia Ierodiaconou
236	9	12 February 2005	(China) Changchun	AE	(China) Nina Li	(Switzerland) Evelyne Leu	(Canada) Deidra Dionne
237	10	19 February 2005	(Italy) Sauze d'Oulx	AE	(Switzerland) Evelyne Leu	(China) Nina Li	(China) Xinxin Guo
238	11	5 March 2005	(Czech Republic) Špindlerův Mlýn	AE	(China) Nina Li	(Switzerland) Evelyne Leu	(Russia) Anna Zukal
239	12	11 March 2005	(Italy) Madonna di Campiglio	AE	(China) Nina Li	(Russia) Anna Zukal	(Belarus) Assoli Slivets

=== Moguls ===
Num	Season	Date	Place	Event	Winner	Second	Third
226	1	16 December 2004	(France) Tignes	MO	(Canada) Jennifer Heil	(Norway) Kari Traa	(Sweden) Sara Kjellin
227	2	8 January 2005	(Canada) Mont Tremblant	MO	(Czech Republic) Nikola Sudová	(Austria) Margarita Marbler	(United States) Hannah Kearney
228	3	15 January 2005	(United States) Lake Placid	MO	(Canada) Jennifer Heil	(Czech Republic) Nikola Sudová	(United States) Michelle Roark
229	4	22 January 2005	(Canada) Fernie	MO	(Norway) Kari Traa	(Canada) Jennifer Heil	(United States) Jillian Vogtli
230	5	27 January 2005	(United States) Deer Valley	MO	(United States) Michelle Roark	(Austria) Margarita Marbler	(United States) Hannah Kearney
231	6	29 January 2005	(United States) Deer Valley	MO	(Canada) Jennifer Heil	(United States) Hannah Kearney	(Czech Republic) Nikola Sudová
232	7	5 February 2005	(Japan) Inawashiro	MO	(United States) Jillian Vogtli	(Austria) Margarita Marbler	(United States) Hannah Kearney
233	8	6 February 2005	(Japan) Inawashiro	MO	(Canada) Jennifer Heil	(Japan) Tae Satoya	(Norway) Kari Traa
234	9	11 February 2005	(Japan) Naeba	MO	(Canada) Jennifer Heil	(Norway) Kari Traa	(United States) Jillian Vogtli
235	10	18 February 2005	(Italy) Sauze d'Oulx	MO	(Norway) Kari Traa	(Canada) Stéphanie St-Pierre	(Czech Republic) Nikola Sudová
236	11	26 February 2005	(Norway) Voss	MO	(Japan) Aiko Uemura	(Austria) Margarita Marbler	(Czech Republic) Nikola Sudová

=== Ski Cross ===
Num	Season	Date	Place	Event	Winner	Second	Third
12	1	25 October 2004	(Switzerland) Saas-Fee	SX	(France) Ophélie David	(Canada) Ashleigh McIvor	(France) Virginie Costerg
13	2	7 January 2005	(France) Les Contamines	SX	(France) Ophélie David	(Austria) Karin Huttary	(Switzerland) Franziska Steffen
14	3	15 January 2005	(Italy) Pozza di Fassa	SX	(Sweden) Magdalena Iljans	(France) Ophélie David	(Germany) Angela Senftinger
15	4	21 January 2005	(Austria) Kreischberg	SX	(Austria) Karin Huttary	(Switzerland) Franziska Steffen	(Germany) Alexandra Grauvogl
16	5	10 February 2005	(Japan) Naeba	SX	(Austria) Karin Huttary	(Switzerland) Franziska Steffen	(France) Ophélie David
17	6	5 March 2005 (Note: replaced skicross event from Laax for ladies.)	(Switzerland) Grindelwald	SX	(Austria) Katharina Gutensohn	(Austria) Karin Huttary	(Sweden) Magdalena Iljans

=== Halfpipe ===
Num	Season	Date	Place	Event	Winner	Second	Third
		26 October 2004	(Switzerland) Saas-Fee	HP	cancelled		
		8 January 2005	(France) Les Contamines	HP	cancelled		

== Men's standings ==
=== Overall ===
Rank		Points
1	(United States) Jeremy Bloom	75
2	(Czech Republic) Tomáš Kraus	68
3	(Austria) Isidor Grüner	65
4	(United States) Jeret Peterson	58
5	(Czech Republic) Stanley Hayer	56

- Standings after 29 races.

=== Moguls ===
Rank		Points
1	(United States) Jeremy Bloom	820
2	(Australia) Dale Begg-Smith	478
3	(United States) Nathan Roberts	440
4	(Finland) Mikko Ronkainen	430
5	(United States) Travis Mayer	419

- Standings after 11 races.

=== Aerials ===
Rank		Points
1	(United States) Jeret Peterson	694
2	(Canada) Steve Omischl	604
3	(China) Xiaopeng Han	455
4	(Russia) Dmitry Arkhipov	447
5	(Belarus) Dmitri Dashinski	440

- Standings after 12 races.

=== Ski Cross ===
Rank		Points
1	(Czech Republic) Tomáš Kraus	408
2	(Austria) Isidor Grüner	391
3	(Czech Republic) Stanley Hayer	338
4	(Switzerland) Andreas Steffen	224
5	(France) Simon Bastelica	221

- Standings after 6 races.

== Ladies' standings ==
=== Overall ===
Rank		Points
1	(China) Nina Li	85
2	(France) Ophélie David	72
3	(Austria) Karin Huttary	71
4	(Canada) Jennifer Heil	71
5	(Australia) Lydia Ierodiaconou	56

- Standings after 29 races.

=== Moguls ===
Rank		Points
1	(Canada) Jennifer Heil	780
2	(Norway) Kari Traa	571
3	(Austria) Margarita Marbler	568
4	(Czech Republic) Nikola Sudová	546
5	(United States) Hannah Kearney	482

- Standings after 11 races.

=== Aerials ===
Rank		Points
1	(China) Nina li	1025
2	(Australia) Lydia Ierodiaconou	668
3	(China) Xinxin Guo	524
4	(Russia) Anna Zukal	438
5	(Australia) Jacqui Cooper	437

- Standings after 12 races.

=== Ski Cross ===
Rank		Points
1	(France) Ophélie David	430
2	(Austria) Karin Huttary	427
3	(Sweden) Magdalena Iljans	305
4	(Switzerland) Franziska Steffen	260
5	(Switzerland) Seraina Murk	192

- Standings after 6 races.

== Nations Cup ==
=== Overall ===
Rank		Points
1	United States	664
2	Canada	612
3	France	365
4	Switzerland	328
5	Austria	311

- Standings after 58 races.

=== Men ===
Rank		Points
1	United States	406
2	Canada	316
3	France	205
4	Austria	168
5	Russia	140

- Standings after 29 races.

=== Ladies ===
Rank		Points
1	Canada	296
2	United States	258
3	Switzerland	188
4	China	170
5	France	160

- Standings after 29 races.
