= 2003–04 FIS Freestyle Skiing World Cup =

2003-2004 season of the FIS Freestyle Skiing World Cup

Freestyle Skiing World Cup 2003/04
Discipline	Men	Women
Overall	(Canada) Steve Omischl	(Norway) Kari Traa
Moguls	(Finland) Janne Lahtela	(Canada) Jennifer Heil
Aerials	(Canada) Steve Omischl	(Australia) Alisa Camplin
Ski Cross	(Sweden) Jesper Brugge	(France) Ophélie David
Halfpipe	(France) Mathias Wecxsteen	(France) Marie Martinod
- Nations Cup: France

Competition
Locations	20	20
Individual	37	37
Cancelled	1	1

The 2003/04 FIS Freestyle Skiing World Cup was the twenty fifth World Cup season in freestyle skiing organised by International Ski Federation. The season started on 6 September 2003 and ended on 13 March 2004. This season included four disciplines: aerials, moguls, ski cross and halfpipe.

In this season new discipline halfpipe was for the first time introduced in world cup. Dual moguls counted together with moguls rankings and awarded with small crystal globe joined with moguls. Both events in Inawashiro were moguls events although 15 Feb 2004 is wrongly labeled as dual moguls in official fis results.

== Men ==
=== Moguls ===
Num	Season	Date	Place	Event	Winner	Second	Third
29	1	24 January 2004	(Canada) Fernie	DM	(Canada) Jim Schiman	(United States) Nathan Roberts	(Russia) Vladimir Tyumentsev
30	2	31 January 2004	(Norway) Voss	DM	(Finland) Janne Lahtela	(United States) Jeremy Bloom	(United States) Toby Dawson
214	1	6 December 2003	(Finland) Ruka	MO	(Finland) Janne Lahtela	(United States) Jeremy Bloom	(Finland) Mikko Ronkainen
215	2	19 December 2003 (Note: Replaces moguls event for men from Tignes.)	(Italy) Madonna di Campiglio	MO	(Finland) Janne Lahtela	(Finland) Mikko Ronkainen	(United States) Toby Dawson
216	3	20 December 2003	(Italy) Madonna di Campiglio	MO	(United States) Nathan Roberts	(Finland) Janne Lahtela	(United States) Travis-Antone Cabral
217	4	10 January 2004	(Canada) Mont Tremblant	MO	(Canada) Marc-André Moreau	(United States) Luke Westerlund	(Finland) Tapio Luusua
218	5	17 January 2004	(United States) Lake Placid	MO	(Finland) Janne Lahtela	(United States) Luke Westerlund	(United States) Travis-Antone Cabral
219	6	30 January 2004	(United States) Deer Valley	MO	(United States) Toby Dawson	(Finland) Janne Lahtela	(United States) Travis-Antone Cabral
220	7	14 February 2004	(Japan) Inawashiro	MO	(United States) Toby Dawson	(Canada) Jim Schiman	(United States) Jeremy Bloom
221	8	15 February 2004*	(Japan) Inawashiro	MO	(United States) Travis-Antone Cabral	(United States) Toby Dawson	(Finland) Mikko Ronkainen
222	9	22 February 2004	(Japan) Naeba	MO	(United States) Toby Dawson	(United States) Travis-Antone Cabral	(United States) Jeremy Bloom
223	10	1 March 2004	(Czech Republic) Špindlerův Mlýn	MO	(United States) Jeremy Bloom	(Finland) Janne Lahtela	(United States) Toby Dawson
		6 March 2004	(Switzerland) Airolo	MO	cancelled		
224	11	7 March 2004	(Switzerland) Airolo	MO	(United States) David Babic	(Canada) Pierre-Alexandre Rousseau	(Finland) Janne Lahtela
225	12	14 March 2004	(Italy) Sauze d'Oulx	MO	(Finland) Janne Lahtela	(Canada) Pierre-Alexandre Rousseau	(United States) David Babic

=== Aerials ===
Num	Season	Date	Place	Event	Winner	Second	Third
214	1	6 September 2003	(Australia) Mt. Buller	AE	(Canada) Steve Omischl	(China) Xiaotao Ou	(Switzerland) Christian Kaufmann
215	2	7 September 2003	(Australia) Mt. Buller	AE	(Canada) Steve Omischl	(Belarus) Dmitri Dashinski	(Switzerland) Martin Walti
216	3	5 December 2003	(Finland) Ruka	AE	(Belarus) Dmitri Dashinski	(Canada) Kyle Nissen	(Ukraine) Stanislav Kravchuk
217	4	11 January 2004	(Canada) Mont Tremblant	AE	(Belarus) Aleksei Grishin	(Canada) Warren Shouldice	(China) Ou Xiaotao
218	5	16 January 2004	(United States) Lake Placid	AE	(Canada) Steve Omischl	(Czech Republic) Aleš Valenta	(Belarus) Dmitri Dashinski
219	6	18 January 2004	(United States) Lake Placid	AE	(Canada) Steve Omischl	(Belarus) Aleksei Grishin	(Canada) Ryan Blais
220	7	25 January 2004	(Canada) Fernie	AE	(Czech Republic) Aleš Valenta	(Canada) Steve Omischl	(Canada) Ryan Blais
221	8	31 January 2004	(United States) Deer Valley	AE	(Belarus) Dmitri Dashinski	(Canada) Steve Omischl	(United States) Jeret Peterson
222	9	14 February 2004	(China) Harbin/Long-zhu	AE	(Belarus) Aleksei Grishin	(Belarus) Dmitri Dashinski	(China) Sen Qiu
223	10	15 February 2004	(China) Harbin/Long-zhu	AE	(Canada) Steve Omischl	(United States) Joe Pack	(China) Sen Qiu
224	11	28 February 2004	(Czech Republic) Špindlerův Mlýn	AE	(China) Xiaotao Ou	(Canada) Steve Omischl	(United States) Joe Pack
225	12	10 March 2004	(Italy) Sauze d'Oulx	AE	(Canada) Steve Omischl	(Russia) Dmitry Arkhipov	(Belarus) Dmitri Dashinski

=== Ski Cross ===
Num	Season	Date	Place	Event	Winner	Second	Third
4	1	23 November 2003	(Switzerland) Saas-Fee	SX	(Switzerland) Patrick Schmid	(Austria) Isidor Grüner	(Sweden) Lars Lewén
5	2	7 January 2004	(France) Les Contamines	SX	(France) Enak Gavaggio	(France) Xavier Kuhn	(Japan) Hiroomi Takizawa
6	3	10 January 2004 (Note: Replaces skicross for men from Tignes.)	(Italy) Pozza di Fassa	SX	(Italy) Karl Heinz Molling	(Sweden) Jesper Brugge	(Japan) Hiroomi Takizawa
7	4	11 January 2004	(Italy) Pozza di Fassa	SX	(France) Enak Gavaggio	(Sweden) Jesper Brugge	(France) Mathias Collomb-Patton
8	5	18 January 2004	(Switzerland) Laax	SX	(France) Enak Gavaggio	(Austria) Roman Hofer	(Japan) Hiroomi Takizawa
9	6	31 January 2004	(Czech Republic) Špindlerův Mlýn	SX	(France) Xavier Kuhn	(Sweden) Jesper Brugge	(Austria) Roman Hofer
10	7	21 February 2004	(Japan) Naeba	SX	(Japan) Hiroomi Takizawa	(Italy) Massimiliano Iezza	(Sweden) Jesper Brugge
11	8	12 March 2004	(Italy) Sauze d'Oulx	SX	(Sweden) Jesper Brugge	(Austria) Roman Hofer	(Sweden) Lars Lewén

=== Halfpipe ===
Num	Season	Date	Place	Event	Winner	Second	Third
1	1	22 November 2003	(Switzerland) Saas-Fee	HP	(France) Mathias Wecxsteen	(France) Vincent Estorc	(France) Arnaud Rougier
2	2	8 March 2004 (Note: Replaces halfpipe event for men from Les Contamines from beginning of the year.)	(France) Les Contamines	HP	(France) Laurent Favre	(France) Mickaël Moh Navarro	(France) Vincent Estorc
3	3	13 March 2004	(Italy) Bardonecchia	HP	(France) Mathias Wecxsteen	(France) Aurélien Fornier	(France) Laurent Favre

== Ladies ==
=== Moguls ===
Num	Season	Date	Place	Event	Winner	Second	Third
29	1	24 January 2004	(Canada) Fernie	DM	(Canada) Elisa Kurylowicz	(United States) Jillian Vogtli	(United States) Shelly Robertson
30	2	31 January 2004	(Norway) Voss	DM	(Norway) Kari Traa	(Sweden) Sara Kjellin	(Austria) Margarita Marbler
214	1	6 December 2003	(Finland) Ruka	MO	(Norway) Kari Traa	(Canada) Jennifer Heil	(United States) Hannah Kearney
215	2	19 December 2003 (Note: Replaces moguls event for ladies from Tignes.)	(Italy) Madonna di Campiglio	MO	(Canada) Jennifer Heil	(United States) Shannon Bahrke	(Austria) Margarita Marbler
216	3	20 December 2003	(Italy) Madonna di Campiglio	MO	(Norway) Kari Traa	(United States) Shannon Bahrke	(Canada) Stéphanie St-Pierre
217	4	10 January 2004	(Canada) Mont Tremblant	MO	(Canada) Stéphanie St-Pierre	(Canada) Jennifer Heil	(United States) Shannon Bahrke
218	5	17 January 2004	(United States) Lake Placid	MO	(Canada) Jennifer Heil	(United States) Shannon Bahrke	(Canada) Stéphanie St-Pierre
219	6	30 January 2004	(United States) Deer Valley	MO	(Norway) Kari Traa	(United States) Hannah Kearney	(Canada) Jennifer Heil
220	7	14 February 2004	(Japan) Inawashiro	MO	(Austria) Margarita Marbler	(Canada) Jennifer Heil	(United States) Jillian Vogtli
221	8	15 February 2004*	(Japan) Inawashiro	DM	(Austria) Margarita Marbler	(Canada) Jennifer Heil	(Norway) Kari Traa
222	9	22 February 2004	(Japan) Naeba	MO	(United States) Hannah Kearney	(Austria) Margarita Marbler	(United States) Laurel Shanley
223	10	29 February 2004	(Czech Republic) Špindlerův Mlýn	MO	(Canada) Jennifer Heil	(Norway) Kari Traa	(Austria) Margarita Marbler
		6 March 2004	(Switzerland) Airolo	MO	cancelled		
224	11	7 March 2004	(Switzerland) Airolo	MO	(United States) Hannah Kearney	(Austria) Margarita Marbler	(Canada) Jennifer Heil
225	12	14 March 2004	(Italy) Sauze d'Oulx	MO	(Norway) Kari Traa	(United States) Hannah Kearney	(Austria) Margarita Marbler

=== Aerials ===
Num	Season	Date	Place	Event	Winner	Second	Third
216	1	6 September 2003	(Australia) Mt. Buller	AE	(China) Nannan Xu	(Australia) Alisa Camplin	(Australia) Lydia Ierodiaconou
217	2	7 September 2003	(Australia) Mt. Buller	AE	(Australia) Lydia Ierodiaconou	(Canada) Veronika Bauer	(China) Nannan Xu
218	3	5 December 2003	(Finland) Ruka	AE	(Australia) Alisa Camplin	(China) Nina Li	(United States) Kate Reed
219	4	11 January 2004	(Canada) Mont Tremblant	AE	(Australia) Alisa Camplin	(China) Nina Li	(Canada) Deidra Dionne
220	5	16 January 2004	(United States) Lake Placid	AE	(China) Jiao Wang	(China) Nina Li	(Australia) Lydia Ierodiaconou
221	6	18 January 2004	(United States) Lake Placid	AE	(Australia) Alisa Camplin	(Australia) Lydia Ierodiaconou	(Belarus) Assoli Slivets
222	7	25 January 2004	(Canada) Fernie	AE	(Australia) Alisa Camplin	(Canada) Veronika Bauer	(Australia) Elizabeth Gardner
223	8	31 January 2004	(United States) Deer Valley	AE	(Australia) Alisa Camplin	(Australia) Lydia Ierodiaconou	(Switzerland) Evelyne Leu
224	9	14 February 2004	(China) Harbin/Long-zhu	AE	(Australia) Alisa Camplin	(Switzerland) Evelyne Leu	(Canada) Veronika Bauer
225	10	15 February 2004	(China) Harbin/Long-zhu	AE	(Australia) Lydia Ierodiaconou	(Russia) Anna Zukal	(Australia) Alisa Camplin
226	11	28 February 2004	(Czech Republic) Špindlerův Mlýn	AE	(China) Nina Li	(Australia) Alisa Camplin	(Australia) Lydia Ierodiaconou
227	12	10 March 2004	(Italy) Sauze d'Oulx	AE	(Australia) Alisa Camplin	(Switzerland) Evelyne Leu	(Australia) Elizabeth Gardner

=== Ski Cross ===
Num	Season	Date	Place	Event	Winner	Second	Third
4	1	23 November 2003	(Switzerland) Saas-Fee	SX	(Slovenia) Saša Farič	(Switzerland) Franziska Steffen	(Sweden) Magdalena Iljans
5	2	7 January 2004	(France) Les Contamines	SX	(France) Ophélie David	(Switzerland) Franziska Steffen	(France) Valentine Scuotto
6	3	10 January 2004 (Note: Replaces skicross for ladies from Tignes.)	(Italy) Pozza di Fassa	SX	(Switzerland) Franziska Steffen	(Canada) Aleisha Cline	(France) Ophélie David
7	4	11 January 2004	(Italy) Pozza di Fassa	SX	(Canada) Aleisha Cline	(Switzerland) Franziska Steffen	(France) Ophélie David
8	5	18 January 2004	(Switzerland) Laax	SX	(Sweden) Magdalena Iljans	(Finland) Josefiina Kilpinen	(France) Valentine Scuotto
9	6	31 January 2004	(Czech Republic) Špindlerův Mlýn	SX	(France) Ophélie David	(Finland) Josefiina Kilpinen	(Sweden) Magdalena Iljans
10	7	21 February 2004	(Japan) Naeba	SX	(Canada) Aleisha Cline	(Sweden) Magdalena Iljans	(Switzerland) Seraina Murk
11	8	12 March 2004	(Italy) Sauze d'Oulx	SX	(France) Ophélie David	(Finland) Josefiina Kilpinen	(Canada) Aleisha Cline

=== Halfpipe ===
Num	Season	Date	Place	Event	Winner	Second	Third
1	1	22 November 2003	(Switzerland) Saas-Fee	HP	(France) Marie Martinod	(Switzerland) Virginie Faivre	(France) Marie Andrieux
2	2	8 March 2004 (Note: Replaces halfpipe event for ladies from Les Contamines from beginning of the year.)	(France) Les Contamines	HP	(France) Marie Martinod	(Switzerland) Virginie Faivre	(Norway) Kari Traa
3	3	13 March 2004	(Italy) Bardonecchia	HP	(France) Marie Martinod	(Switzerland) Virginie Faivre	(Norway) Kari Traa

== Men's standings ==
=== Overall ===
Rank		Points
1	(Canada) Steve Omischl	76
2	(France) Mathias Wecxsteen	74
3	(France) Laurent Favre	70
4	(Finland) Janne Lahtela	64
5	(France) Vincent Estorc	63

- Standings after 37 races.

=== Moguls ===
Rank		Points
1	(Finland) Janne Lahtela	891
2	(United States) Toby Dawson	712
3	(United States) Jeremy Bloom	600
4	(United States) Travis-Antone Cabral	564
5	(United States) Nathan Roberts	486

- Standings after 14 races.

=== Aerials ===
Rank		Points
1	(Canada) Steve Omischl	918
2	(Belarus) Dmitri Dashinski	708
3	(Belarus) Aleksei Grishin	498
4	(Czech Republic) Aleš Valenta	470
5	(United States) Joe Pack	388

- Standings after 12 races.

=== Ski Cross ===
Rank		Points
1	(Sweden) Pierre-Alexandre Rousseau	483
2	(France) David Babic	464
3	(Austria) Luke Westerling	420
4	(Japan) Tapio Luusua	345
5	(France) Marc-André Moreau	325

- Standings after 8 races.

=== Halfpipe ===
Rank		Points
1	(France) Mathias Wecxsteen	222
2	(France) Laurent Favre	210
3	(France) Vincent Estorc	190
4	(France) Aurélien Fornier	154
5	(France) Mickaël Moh Navarro	130

- Standings after 3 races.

== Ladies' standings ==
=== Overall ===
Rank		Points
1	(Norway) Kari Traa	104
2	(France) Marie Martinod	100
3	(Switzerland) Virginie Faivre	80
4	(Australia) Alisa Camplin	79
5	(Canada) Jennifer Heil	67

- Standings after 37 races.

=== Moguls ===
Rank		Points
1	(Canada) Jennifer Heil	940
2	(Norway) Kari Traa	867
3	(Austria) Margarita Marbler	764
4	(United States) Hannah Kearney	665
5	(United States) Shannon Bahrke	501

- Standings after 14 races.

=== Aerials ===
Rank		Points
1	(Australia) Alisa Camplin	948
2	(Australia) Lydia Ierodiaconou	679
3	(Switzerland) Evelyne Leu	467
4	(Russia) Anna Zukal	442
5	(China) Nina Li	433

- Standings after 12 races.

=== Ski Cross ===
Rank		Points
1	(France) Ophélie David	535
2	(Switzerland) Franziska Steffen	455
3	(Sweden) Magdalena Iljans	438
4	(Finland) Josefiina Kilpinen	396
5	(Slovenia) Saša Farič	360

- Standings after 8 races.

=== Halfpipe ===
Rank		Points
1	(France) Marie Martinod	300
2	(Switzerland) Virginie Faivre	240
3	(France) Marie Andrieux	160
4	(Norway) Kari Traa	120
5	(Switzerland) Audrey Faivre	90

- Standings after 3 races.

== Nations Cup ==
=== Overall ===
Rank		Points
1	France	1058
2	United States	710
3	Canada	612
4	Switzerland	506
5	Austria	269

- Standings after 74 races.

=== Men ===
Rank		Points
1	France	742
2	United States	379
3	Canada	336
4	Austria	166
5	Finland	161

- Standings after 37 races.

=== Ladies ===
Rank		Points
1	Switzerland	354
2	United States	331
3	France	316
4	Canada	276
5	Australia	203

- Standings after 37 races.
