= 2002–03 FIS Freestyle Skiing World Cup =

Freestyle skiing competitive season

Freestyle Skiing World Cup 2002/03
Discipline	Men	Women
Overall	(Russia) Dmitry Arkhipov	(Norway) Kari Traa
Moguls	(United States) Travis-Antone Cabral	(United States) Shannon Bahrke
Dual moguls	(Finland) Janne Lahtela	(Austria) Margarita Marbler
Aerials	(Russia) Dmitry Arkhipov	(Australia) Alisa Camplin
Ski Cross	(Japan) Hiroomi Takizawa	(France) Valentine Scuotto
- Nations Cup: United States

Competition
Locations	15	15
Individual	25	25
Cancelled	2	2

The 2002/03 FIS Freestyle Skiing World Cup was the twenty fourth World Cup season in freestyle skiing organised by the International Ski Federation. The season started on 7 September 2002 and ended on 12 March 2003. This season included four disciplines: aerials, moguls, dual moguls and ski cross.

In this season new discipline skicross was for first time introduced in the World Cup. This season dual moguls counted as season title and was awarded with small crystal globe separately from moguls for the last time. From next season on dual moguls became one with moguls ranking, title and its small crystal globe.

== Men ==
=== Moguls ===
Num	Season	Date	Place	Event	Winner	Second	Third
26	1	25 January 2003	(Canada) Fernie	DM	(Finland) Janne Lahtela	(Canada) Stéphane Rochon	(United States) Toby Dawson
27	2	22 February 2003	(Japan) Madarao	DM	(Canada) Pierre-Alexandre Rousseau	(Finland) Janne Lahtela	(Sweden) Fredrik Fortkord
28	3	2 March 2003	(Norway) Voss	DM	(Canada) Stéphane Rochon	(United States) Toby Dawson	(Finland) Janne Lahtela
204	1	1 December 2002	(France) Tignes	MO	(United States) Travis-Antone Cabral	(Canada) Scott Bellavance	(Finland) Janne Lahtela
205	2	7 December 2002	(Italy) Sauze d'Oulx	MO	(Finland) Mikko Ronkainen	(Canada) Scott Bellavance	(United States) Travis Mayer
206	3	14 December 2002	(Italy) Madonna di Campiglio	MO	(United States) Toby Dawson	(Finland) Mikko Ronkainen	(United States) Travis Mayer
207	4	19 December 2002	(Finland) Ruka	MO	(Finland) Tapio Luusua	(United States) Travis Mayer	(Canada) Pierre-Alexandre Rousseau
208	5	11 January 2003	(Canada) Mont Tremblant	MO	(Canada) Pierre-Alexandre Rousseau	(United States) Jeremy Bloom	(Finland) Tapio Luusua
209	6	18 January 2003	(United States) Lake Placid	MO	(United States) Travis-Antone Cabral	(Finland) Janne Lahtela	(Canada) Pierre-Alexandre Rousseau
210	7	8 February 2003	(United States) Steamboat	MO	(United States) Jeremy Bloom	(Canada) Pierre-Alexandre Rousseau	(United States) David Babic
211	8	15 February 2003	(Japan) Inawashiro	MO	(United States) Travis-Antone Cabral	(Finland) Mikko Ronkainen	(Russia) Vitaly Glushchenko
212	9	23 February 2003	(Japan) Madarao	MO	(United States) Jeremy Bloom	(United States) Travis-Antone Cabral	(Canada) Pierre-Alexandre Rousseau
213	10	1 March 2003	(Norway) Voss	MO	(Finland) Janne Lahtela	(United States) Luke Westerlund	(United States) Travis Mayer

=== Aerials ===
Num	Season	Date	Place	Event	Winner	Second	Third
205	1	7 September 2002	(Australia) Mt. Buller	AE	(Canada) Jeff Bean	(Belarus) Aleksei Grishin	(United States) Eric Bergoust
206	2	8 September 2002	(Australia) Mt. Buller	AE	(Canada) Steve Omischl	(Austria) Christian Rijavec	(United States) Joe Pack
207	3	12 January 2003	(Canada) Mont Tremblant	AE	(Canada) Jeff Bean	(United States) Jeret Peterson	(Canada) Ryan Blais
208	4	17 January 2003	(United States) Lake Placid	AE	(Russia) Dmitry Arkhipov	(Canada) Steve Omischl	(China) Xiaopeng Han
209	5	19 January 2003	(United States) Lake Placid	AE	(Canada) Ryan Blais	(Belarus) Dmitri Dashinski	(Canada) Jeff Bean
210	6	26 January 2003	(Canada) Fernie	AE	(Czech Republic) Aleš Valenta	(Russia) Dmitry Arkhipov	(China) Xiaotao Ou
211	7	7 February 2003	(United States) Steamboat	AE	(Russia) Dmitry Arkhipov	(Belarus) Aleksei Grishin	(Canada) Steve Omischl
212	8	1 March 2003	(Czech Republic) Špindlerův Mlýn	AE	(Russia) Dmitry Arkhipov	(Canada) Jeff Bean	(China) Xiaotao Ou
213	9	2 March 2003	(Czech Republic) Špindlerův Mlýn	AE	(Canada) Steve Omischl	(Russia) Dmitry Arkhipov	(United States) Joe Pack

=== Ski Cross ===
Num	Season	Date	Place	Event	Winner	Second	Third
1	1	30 November 2002	(France) Tignes	SX	(Czech Republic) Tomáš Kraus	(Austria) Isidor Grüner	(Austria) Markus Wittner
		6 December 2002	(Italy) Sauze d'Oulx	SX	cancelled		
		15 December 2002	(Italy) Madonna di Campiglio	SX	cancelled		
2	2	18 January 2003	(Switzerland) Laax	SX	(France) Enak Gavaggio	(Japan) Hiroomi Takizawa	(Austria) Markus Wittner
3	3	12 March 2003	(France) Les Contamines	SX	(Japan) Hiroomi Takizawa	(Italy) Karl Heinz Molling	(France) Xavier Mathex

== Ladies ==
=== Moguls ===
Num	Season	Date	Place	Event	Winner	Second	Third
26	1	25 January 2003	(Canada) Fernie	DM	(Canada) Stéphanie St-Pierre	(Canada) Tami Bradley	(Austria) Margarita Marbler
27	2	22 February 2003	(Japan) Madarao	DM	(France) Berenice Gregoire	(Japan) Aiko Uemura	(Austria) Margarita Marbler
28	3	1 March 2003	(Norway) Voss	DM	(Norway) Kari Traa	(Japan) Aiko Uemura	(United States) Shelly Robertson
204	1	1 December 2002	(France) Tignes	MO	(Austria) Margarita Marbler	(United States) Shannon Bahrke	(United States) Michelle Roark
205	2	7 December 2002	(Italy) Sauze d'Oulx	MO	(Norway) Kari Traa	(United States) Shannon Bahrke	(Austria) Margarita Marbler
206	3	14 December 2002	(Italy) Madonna di Campiglio	MO	(United States) Shannon Bahrke	(Norway) Ingrid Berntsen	(Norway) Kari Traa
207	4	19 December 2002	(Finland) Ruka	MO	(Norway) Kari Traa	(Norway) Ingrid Berntsen	(United States) Shannon Bahrke
208	5	11 January 2003	(Canada) Mont Tremblant	MO	(United States) Shannon Bahrke	(Russia) Marina Cherkasova	(United States) Laurel Shanley
209	6	18 January 2003	(United States) Lake Placid	MO	(Japan) Aiko Uemura	(France) Sandra Laoura	(Norway) Ingrid Berntsen
210	7	8 February 2003	(United States) Steamboat	MO	(Norway) Kari Traa	(United States) Shannon Bahrke	(Norway) Ingrid Berntsen
211	8	15 February 2003	(Japan) Inawashiro	MO	(Norway) Kari Traa	(United States) Michelle Roark	(France) Sandra Laoura
212	9	23 February 2003	(Japan) Madarao	MO	(Austria) Margarita Marbler	(United States) Shannon Bahrke	(Norway) Kari Traa
213	10	1 March 2003	(Norway) Voss	MO	(United States) Shannon Bahrke	(Japan) Aiko Uemura	(Norway) Kari Traa

=== Aerials ===
Num	Season	Date	Place	Event	Winner	Second	Third
207	1	7 September 2002	(Australia) Mt. Buller	AE	(Canada) Veronika Bauer	(Australia) Lydia Ierodiaconou	(Russia) Anna Zukal
208	2	8 September 2002	(Australia) Mt. Buller	AE	(Canada) Veronika Bauer	(Australia) Alisa Camplin	(China) Nannan Xu
209	3	12 January 2003	(Canada) Mont Tremblant	AE	(Australia) Alisa Camplin	(Australia) Lydia Ierodiaconou	(United States) Kate Reed
210	4	17 January 2003	(United States) Lake Placid	AE	(Australia) Alisa Camplin	(China) Nina Li	(Belarus) Alla Tsuper
211	5	19 January 2003	(United States) Lake Placid	AE	(China) Nannan Xu	(China) Nina Li	(Belarus) Alla Tsuper
212	6	26 January 2003	(Canada) Fernie	AE	(Canada) Veronika Bauer	(Belarus) Alla Tsuper	(China) Nina Li
213	7	7 February 2003	(United States) Steamboat	AE	(Australia) Alisa Camplin	(Australia) Lydia Ierodiaconou	(Canada) Veronika Bauer
214	8	1 March 2003	(Czech Republic) Špindlerův Mlýn	AE	(Australia) Lydia Ierodiaconou	(China) Nina Li	(Australia) Alisa Camplin
215	9	2 March 2003	(Czech Republic) Špindlerův Mlýn	AE	(Switzerland) Evelyne Leu	(Belarus) Assoli Slivets	(Australia) Alisa Camplin

=== Ski Cross ===
Num	Season	Date	Place	Event	Winner	Second	Third
1	1	30 November 2002	(France) Tignes	SX	(Sweden) Magdalena Iljans	(Canada) Aleisha Cline	(France) Valentine Scuotto
		6 December 2002	(Italy) Sauze d'Oulx	SX	cancelled		
		15 December 2002	(Italy) Madonna di Campiglio	SX	cancelled		
2	2	18 January 2003	(Switzerland) Laax	SX	(Sweden) Magdalena Iljans	(France) Valentine Scuotto	(Austria) Karin Huttary
3	3	12 March 2003	(France) Les Contamines	SX	(Austria) Karin Huttary	(Norway) Ingrid Berntsen	(Canada) Aleisha Cline

== Men's standings ==
=== Overall ===
Rank		Points
1	(Russia) Dmitry Arkhipov	95
2	(Canada) Steve Omischl	93
3	(Canada) Jeff Bean	93
4	(United States) Travis-Antone Cabral	90
5	(Japan) Hiroomi Takizawa	89

- Standings after 25 races.

=== Moguls ===
Rank		Points
1	(United States) Travis-Antone Cabral	628
2	(Canada) Pierre-Alexandre Rousseau	616
3	(United States) Travis Mayer	616
4	(United States) Toby Dawson	596
5	(Finland) Mikko Ronkainen	576

- Standings after 10 races.

=== Aerials ===
Rank		Points
1	(Russia) Dmitry Arkhipov	572
2	(Canada) Steve Omischl	560
3	(Canada) Jeff Bean	556
4	(United States) Joe Pack	488
5	(Belarus) Aleksei Grishin	476

- Standings after 9 races.

=== Ski Cross ===
Rank		Points
1	(Japan) Hiroomi Takizawa	268
2	(France) Enak Gavaggio	252
3	(Austria) Markus Wittner	232
4	(Austria) Isidor Grüner	180
5	(Czech Republic) Tomáš Kraus	172

- Standings after 3 races.

=== Dual moguls ===
Rank		Points
1	(Finland) Janne Lahtela	264
2	(Canada) Stéphane Rochon	260
3	(Sweden) Fredrik Fortkord	248
4	(Canada) Pierre-Alexandre Rousseau	220
5	(Japan) Yugo Tsukita	208

- Standings after 3 races.

== Ladies' standings ==
=== Overall ===
Rank		Points
1	(Norway) Kari Traa	125
2	(Norway) Ingrid Berntsen	117
3	(Austria) Margarita Marbler	113
4	(United States) Shannon Bahrke	98
5	(Australia) Alisa Camplin	97

- Standings after 25 races.

=== Moguls ===
Rank		Points
1	(United States) Shannon Bahrke	684
2	(Norway) Kari Traa	676
3	(Austria) Margarita Marbler	612
4	(Norway) Ingrid Berntsen	604
5	(France) Sandra Laoura	588

- Standings after 10 races.

=== Aerials ===
Rank		Points
1	(Australia) Alisa Camplin	580
2	(Australia) Lydia Ierodiaconou	556
2	(Canada) Veronika Bauer	556
4	(China) Li Nina	552
5	(Russia) Anna Zukal	500

- Standings after 9 races.

=== Ski Cross ===
Rank		Points
1	(France) Valentine Scuotto	276
2	(Sweden) Magdalena Iljans	252
3	(Switzerland) Annick Staudenmann	216
4	(Austria) Karin Huttary	192
5	(Canada) Aleisha Cline	188

- Standings after 3 races.

=== Dual moguls ===
Rank		Points
1	(Austria) Margarita Marbler	236
2	(Canada) Tami Bradley	208
3	(Norway) Kari Traa	204
4	(Canada) Elisa Kurylowicz	200
5	(Japan) Aiko Uemura	196

- Standings after 3 races.

== Nations Cup ==
=== Overall ===
Rank		Points
1	United States	1567
2	Canada	1485
3	France	850
4	Switzerland	705
5	Austria	532

- Standings after 50 races.

=== Men ===
Rank		Points
1	United States	912
2	Canada	799
3	France	483
4	Austria	355
5	Finland	313

- Standings after 25 races.

=== Ladies ===
Rank		Points
1	Canada	686
2	United States	655
3	Switzerland	468
4	Australia	437
5	France	367

- Standings after 25 races.
