= Simon Bastelica =

French skier (born 1977)

Simon Bastelica (born 1977) is a retired French alpine skier and freestyle skier.

He made his Alpine Skiing World Cup debut in December 1998 in Bormio. Some weeks later he collected his first World Cup points with a 27th-place finish in Wengen. After a series of lowly finishes he improved to 16th place in the super-G race in January 2001 in Garmisch-Partenkirchen. His last World Cup outing came in February 2002 in St. Moritz. He also competed at the 2001 World Championships, but failed to finish the super-G race.

Bastelica instead took up freestyle skiing, specifically the ski cross. He made his Freestyle Skiing World Cup debut in November 2002 in Tignes. After achieving a 7th place in January 2003 in Laax, he amassed a total of ten top-10 placements, the best being a second place in January 2005 in Pozza di Fassa. His last World Cup outing came in January 2008 in Les Contamines. He also finished 12th at the 2005 World Championships and 17th at the 2007 World Championships.

He represented the sports club Biguglia Sports Neige.
