= Enver Ablaev =

Ukrainian freestyle skier (born 1977)

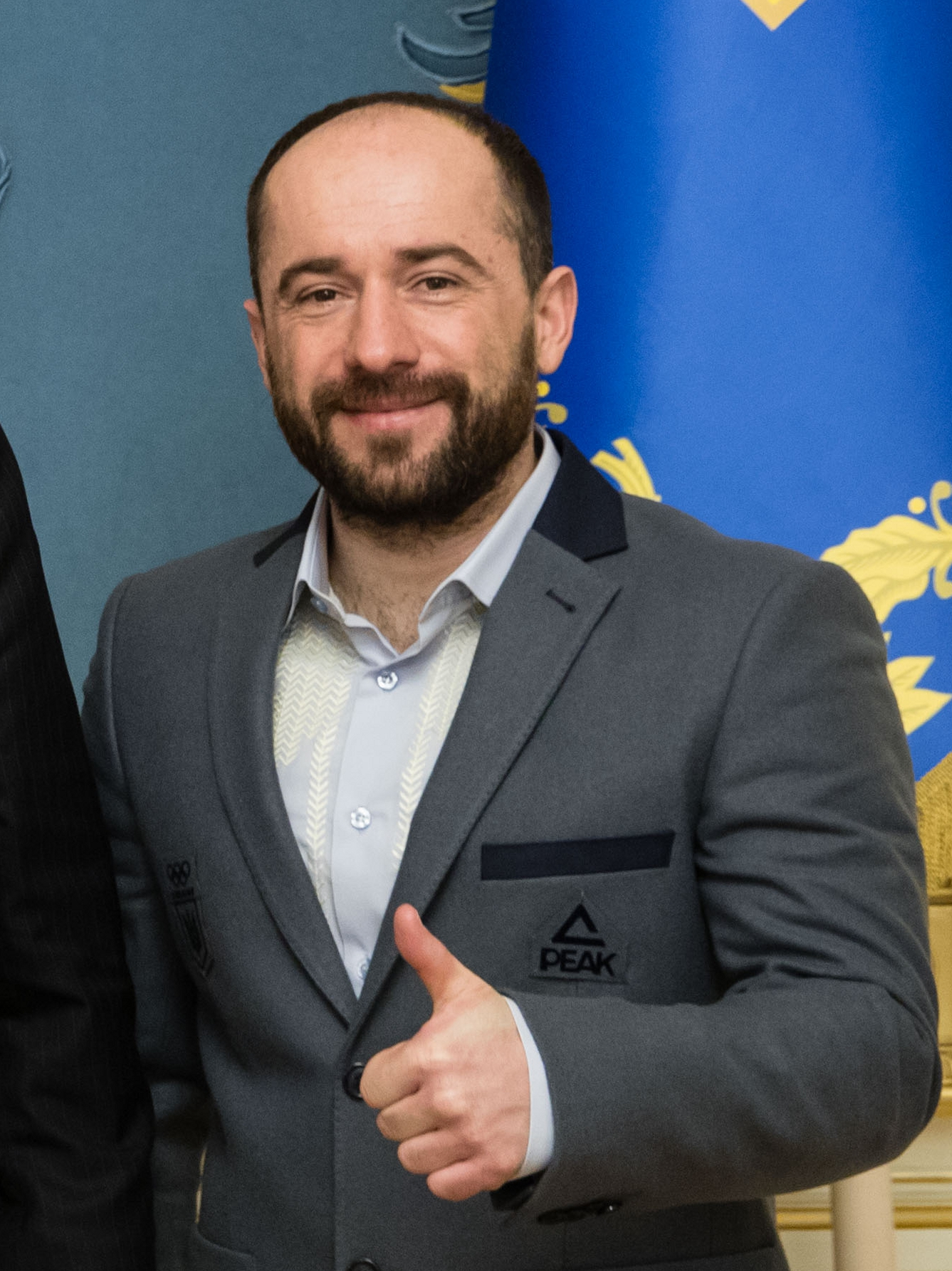

Personal information
- Born: 5 June 1979 (age 47) Chirchiq, Uzbek SSR, Soviet Union

Sport
- Sport: Skiing

World Cup career
- Indiv. podiums: 1
- Indiv. wins: 1
- Updated on 28 March 2013

Enver Nazymovych Ablaev (Crimean Tatar: Enver Nazim oğlu Ablayev, Ukrainian: Енвер Назімович Аблаєв; born 5 June 1977) is a Crimean Tatar freestyle skier of specializing in aerials who has represented Ukraine in the Olympics.

== Early life ==
Ablaev was born on 5 June 1977 in the city of Chirchiq, which was then part of the Uzbek SSR in the Soviet Union. When he was sevenn, he first started training in artistic gymnastics under coach Anatolii Pavlovych Mazur, but after a year and a half switched to freestyle skiing. He started training in the city of Mykolaiv for the sport, and in 1995 permanently moved to Ukraine to settle in the border town of Berehove and later Mukachevo. In 1996, he started studying at Mukachevo Vocational School No. 31 as a driver, before switching to attend the Mukachevo Technological Institute until 2002. He later returned to seeking a higher education, and attended the Uzhhorod National University within the Faculty of Physical Culture and Sports, and graduated there.

== Career ==
Ablaev competed at the 2002, 2006 and 2010 Winter Olympics for Ukraine. In 2002, he finished 22nd in qualifying in the aerials event. In 2006, he placed 9th in the qualifying round, but finished last out of 12 qualifiers in the final. In 2010, he placed 19th in the qualifying round of the event, again failing to advance to the final.

As of March 2013, his best showing at the World Championships is 4th, in 2003. Ablaev made his World Cup debut in August 2000. As of March 2013, he has one World Cup victory, in 2004/05 in Madonna di Campiglio. His best World Cup overall finish in aerials is 14th, in 2002/03, 2008/09 and 2010/11.

== Personal life ==
In 2015 he married Svitlana Herei, and together a year later they had a son.

== World Cup podiums ==
Date	Location	Rank	Event
11 March 2005	Madonna di Campiglio	1st place, gold medalist(s)	Aerials
