= Franziska Steffen =

Swiss freestyle skier

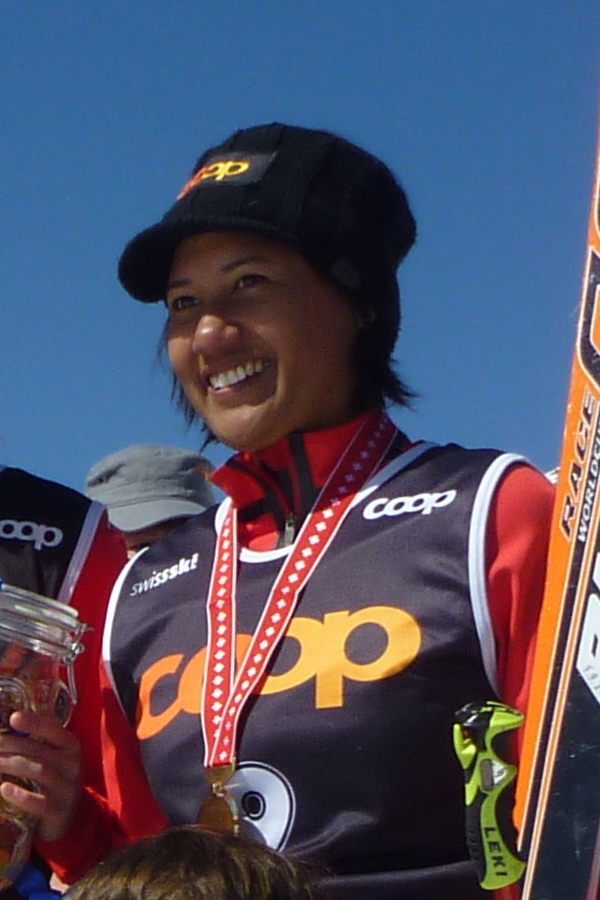

Personal information
- Born: August 25, 1981 (age 44) Surodadi, Indonesia

Sport
- Sport: Skiing

World Cup career
- Indiv. podiums: 7
- Indiv. wins: 1
- Updated on July 31, 2013

Franziska Steffen (Fränzi, born August 25, 1981) is an Indonesian-born Swiss freestyle skier, specializing in ski cross and a former alpine skier.

== Early life ==
Steffen was born in Surodadi, a village in Tegal Regency, Central Java. She was adopted as an infant by Swiss parents from Saanen.

== Athletic career ==
After initially competing in giant slalom, Steffen switched to ski cross in 2003, making her World Cup debut in January. She apparently obtained second place in ski cross at this event, but her result does not appear in the FIS database. She went on to place second and first in several World Cups. Her only finish at the World Championships was 13th, in 2005.

She had one World Cup victory, coming at Pozza di Fassa in 2003/04. This was also her best World Cup overall finish in ski cross, coming in second place. Her 2004/05 season was almost as successful. Steffen was on the podium three times and came third in the discipline rankings. She also won the Swiss national championship in this year.

Steffen was selected to compete in the 2010 Winter Olympics for Switzerland following a disabling injury by Émilie Serain. She placed 29th in the qualifying round in women's ski cross advancing to the knockout stages. She failed to finish her first round heat, and did not advance.

Steffen was injured during training for the 2014 Winter Olympics and was unable to participate in the qualifying rounds.

== Retirement ==
After several injuries, Steffen retired in 2015 and went to work as a civil servant, doubling as a clerk for the town of Saanen and as a tax secretary for the municipality of Bolligen.

== World Cup podiums ==
Date	Location	Rank	Event
23 November 2003	Saas-Fee	2nd place, silver medalist(s)	Ski cross
7 January 2004	Les Contamines	2nd place, silver medalist(s)	Ski cross
10 January 2004	Pozza di Fassa	1st place, gold medalist(s)	Ski cross
10 January 2004	Pozza di Fassa	2nd place, silver medalist(s)	Ski cross
7 January 2005	Les Contamines	3rd place, bronze medalist(s)	Ski cross
21 January 2005	Kreischberg	2nd place, silver medalist(s)	Ski cross
10 February 2005	Naeba	2nd place, silver medalist(s)	Ski cross
