= Markus Wittner =

Austrian freestyle skier

Markus Wittner (born 2 March 1973) is an Austrian freestyle skier who specializes in the skicross discipline.

He made his World Cup debut in November 2002 in Tignes, finishing third. He followed up with a third place in January 2003 in Laax. Over the next seasons he achieved a handful of top-ten results, as well as finishing 21st at the 2005 World Championships, but his next podium places came in January and February 2006 in Kreischberg and Pec respectively. He recorded another third place in January 2009 in Les Contamines.

He represents the sports club SC Kitzbühel.
