= Colby Cohen =

American ice hockey player (born 1989)

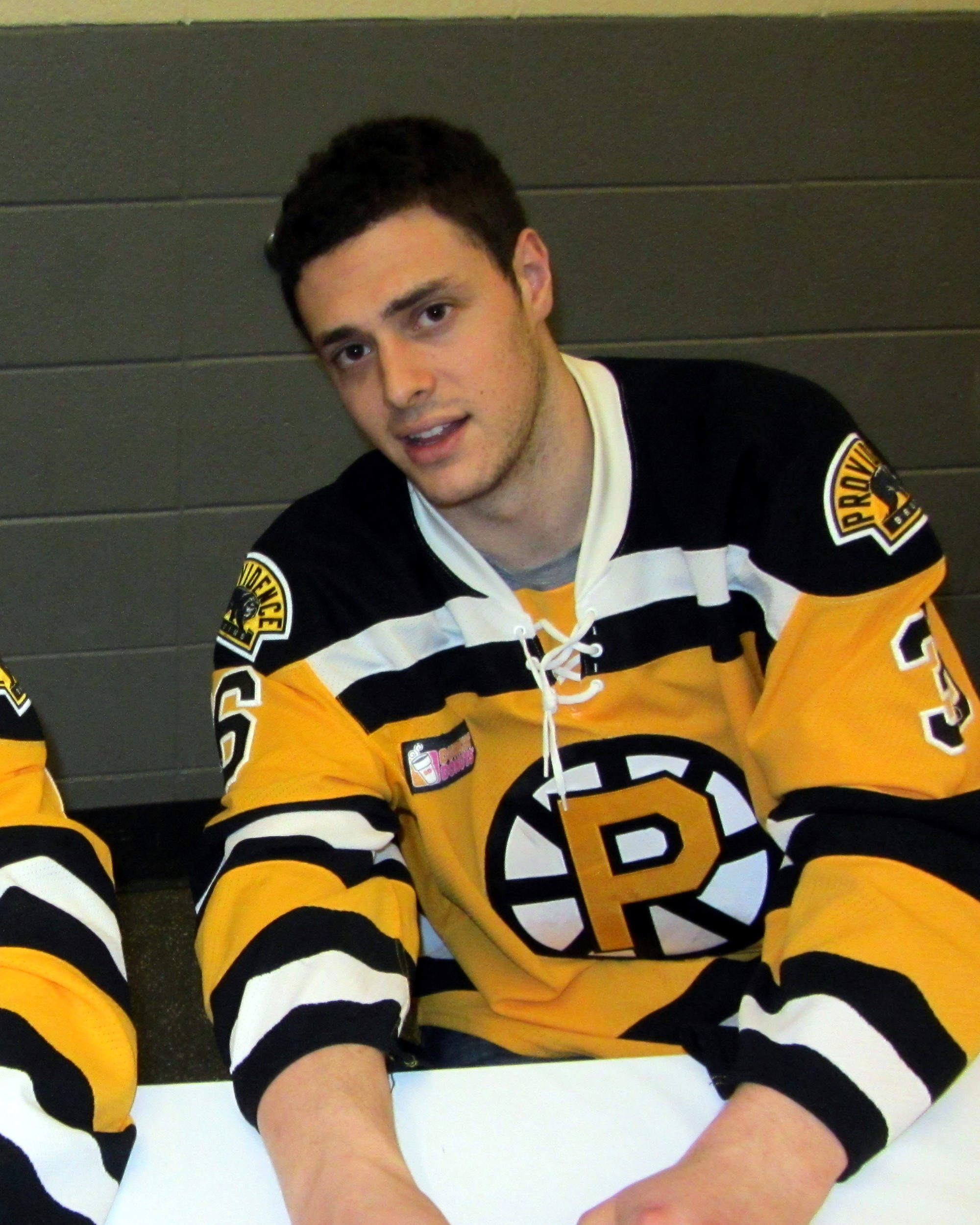
- Cohen in 2012
- Born: April 25, 1989 (age 37) Villanova, Pennsylvania, U.S.
- Height: 6 ft 3 in (191 cm)
- Weight: 215 lb (98 kg; 15 st 5 lb)
- Position: Defense
- Shot: Right
- Played for: Colorado Avalanche; Ässät; HC ’05 Banská Bystrica
- NHL draft: 45th overall, 2007; Colorado Avalanche
- Playing career: 2010–2015

Colby Shane Cohen (born April 25, 1989) is an American former professional ice hockey defenseman. He played 3 games in the National Hockey League with the Colorado Avalanche and in the AHL with the Providence Bruins, the minor league affiliate of the Boston Bruins. Currently, Colby serves as an NCAA college ice hockey and NHL color analyst for Westwood One and ESPN.

== Playing career ==
=== Amateur ===
Cohen first played junior hockey with the Syracuse Stars in the Eastern Junior Hockey League and the Ontario Junior Hockey League in the 2004–05 season. Colby was selected to play in the U.S. National Team Development Program and represented the United States in the 2006 World U-17 Hockey Challenge, in a silver-medal performance.

Committing to a collegiate career with Boston University for 2008, Cohen began the 2006–07 season with the USNTDP before leaving, citing unhappiness within his role, to join the Lincoln Stars of the United States Hockey League. In his lone season with the Stars, Cohen established his offensive prowess and led the entire USHL among defensemen with 60 points in 53 games to earn a place in the USHL Second All-Star Team.

Cohen was then selected as the Colorado Avalanche's second pick, 45th overall, in the 2007 NHL entry draft, joining the Avalanche's first-round pick, former Development Program teammate and fellow BU recruit Kevin Shattenkirk. In his freshman year with the Terriers in 2007–08, Cohen played in 39 out of a possible 40 games in the Hockey East, finishing third among Terriers Blueliners, and trailing only Shattenkirk in assists with 13.

In his sophomore year, Colby enjoyed his most successful collegiate season as BU advanced to the Frozen Four Tournament. In 43 games he compiled 8 goals and 24 assists to finish second among Terrier defensemen with 32 points, while also posting a plus/minus of 24 to finish fifth overall in the country. Colby earned selection to the Frozen Four All-Tournament Team and was named the tournament's Most Outstanding Player after scoring the overtime game-winning goal, from a pass from defense partner Shattenkirk, in a 4–3 victory over the Miami Redhawks to win the 2009 National Championship.

Returning for his junior campaign with the Terriers in 2009–10, Cohen was named as Player of the Month in January but was unable to help the team defend its National Championship after losing in the Hockey East Semi-finals. Cohen was named to the Hockey East First All-Star Team and the NCAA East First All-American Team as he led the team's defense with 30 points in 36 games, scoring 14 goals which were the most scored in a single season by a BU defenseman in over 30 years.

Following elimination, Cohen brought an end to his collegiate career, signing an entry-level contract with the Avalanche, alongside Shattenkirk, on April 3, 2010.

=== Professional ===
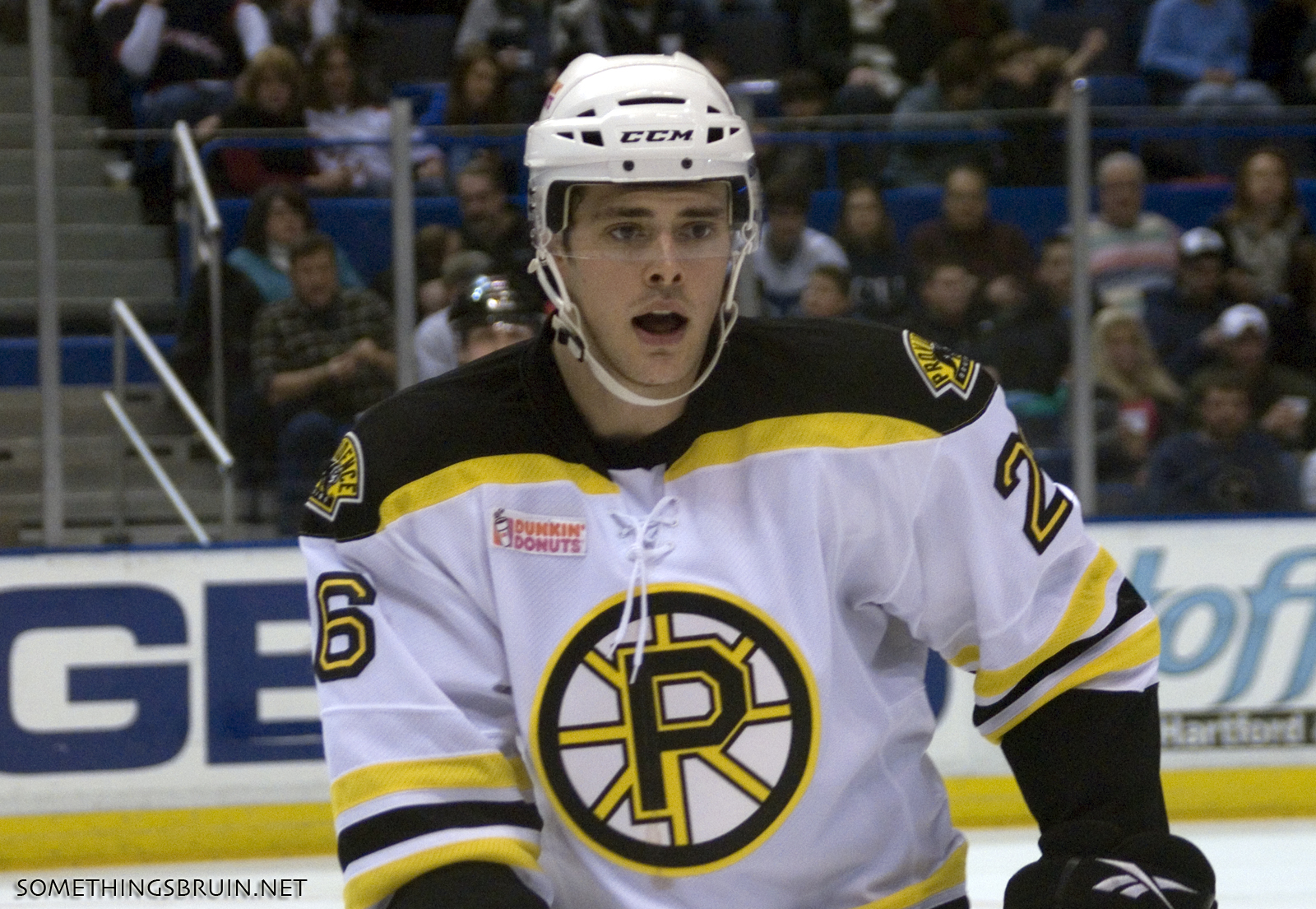
Cohen in 2011

Upon signing with the Avalanche, Cohen moved directly into the American Hockey League and made his professional debut with the Lake Erie Monsters. He finished the 2009–10 season with one assist in three games.

Prior to the 2010–11 season, Cohen attended his first Avalanche training camp and was among the final cuts assigned to Lake Erie on October 3, 2010. After starting the season with the Monsters, Cohen was recalled by the injury-depleted Avalanche and made his NHL debut in a 5–0 shutout win against the Dallas Stars on November 6, 2010. In his ascension to the NHL, Cohen again joined Shattenkirk as a teammate along the blueline.

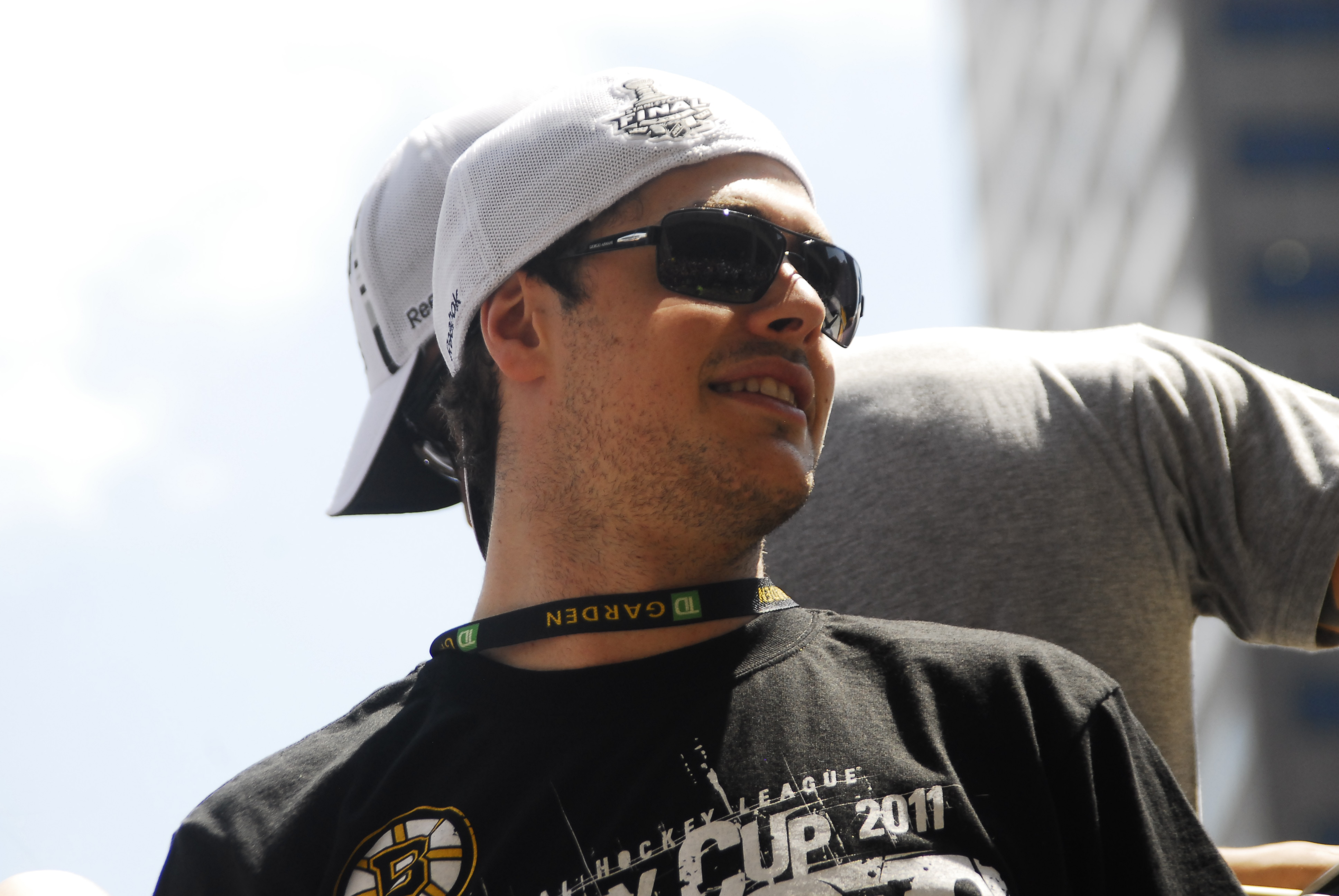
Cohen during Boston Bruins 2011 Stanley Cup victory parade

After three games with the Avalanche, Cohen was returned to Lake Erie before being traded to the Boston Bruins for Matt Hunwick on December 29, 2010. On April 14, 2011, Cohen was called up by the Boston Bruins as a spare for the playoffs, but he did not play so his name was not engraved on the Stanley Cup as a result when the team won the 2011 Stanley Cup Playoffs. The Bruins did, however, include Cohen in the official Stanley Cup photo, and he was presented with a Stanley Cup ring.

On June 26, 2013, Cohen signed his first European contract with the Finnish club Ässät. Five games into the 2013–14 season with Ässät, Cohen left the team to join the San Antonio Rampage of the American Hockey League, for which he would play two games.

After his stint with the Rampage, Cohen joined NESN as a College Ice Hockey Analyst while also completing his degree in History from Boston University. Cohen signaled a return to ice hockey, and after bouncing around European clubs for a season, Cohen opted to end his professional playing career to pursue a career as a television analyst currently working for NBC Sports Philadelphia, ESPN, NESN, CBS Sports, and American Sports Network.

== Personal life ==
Cohen, who is Jewish, was born and raised in Villanova, Pennsylvania. He attended Radnor High School. Cohen is also first cousin to Olympic skier and NFL player Jeremy Bloom.

== Halls of fame ==
In 2019, Cohen was inducted into the Philadelphia Jewish Sports Hall of Fame.

== Career statistics ==
=== Regular season and playoffs ===
			Regular season					Playoffs
Season	Team	League	GP	G	A	Pts	PIM	GP	G	A	Pts	PIM
2004–05	Syracuse Jr. Stars	OPJHL	49	7	21	28	124	11	2	10	12	9
2005–06	U.S. NTDP U17	USDP	46	5	7	12	44	—	—	—	—	—
2005–06	U.S. NTDP U18	NAHL	37	5	9	14	33	10	1	1	2	0
2006–07	Lincoln Stars	USHL	53	13	47	60	110	4	0	0	0	2
2006–07	U.S. NTDP U18	NAHL	4	1	3	4	0	—	—	—	—	—
2007–08	Boston University	HE	39	3	13	16	34	—	—	—	—	—
2008–09	Boston University	HE	43	8	24	32	65	—	—	—	—	—
2009–10	Boston University	HE	36	14	16	30	82	—	—	—	—	—
2009–10	Lake Erie Monsters	AHL	3	0	1	1	9	—	—	—	—	—
2010–11	Lake Erie Monsters	AHL	14	1	0	1	12	—	—	—	—	—
2010–11	Colorado Avalanche	NHL	3	0	0	0	4	—	—	—	—	—
2010–11	Providence Bruins	AHL	46	1	11	12	46	—	—	—	—	—
2011–12	Providence Bruins	AHL	58	4	11	15	39	—	—	—	—	—
2012–13	Providence Bruins	AHL	43	0	14	14	48	—	—	—	—	—
2013–14	Ässät	SM-l	5	0	1	1	2	—	—	—	—	—
2013–14	San Antonio Rampage	AHL	2	0	0	0	0	—	—	—	—	—
2014–15	HC ’05 Banská Bystrica	Slovak	15	0	9	9	60	—	—	—	—	—
NHL totals			3	0	0	0	4	—	—	—	—	—

=== International ===
Year	Team	Event	Result	GP	G	A	Pts	PIM
2006	United States	U17	2nd place, silver medalist(s)	6	1	1	2	6
Junior totals				6	1	1	2	6

== Awards and honors ==
Award	Year
USHL
Second All-Star Team	2006–07
All-Star Game	2006–07
College
NCAA All-Tournament Team	2009
NCAA Frozen Four Tournament Most Outstanding Player	2009
All-Hockey East First Team	2009–10
AHCA East First-Team All-American	2009–10

== See also ==
- List of select Jewish ice hockey players

Awards and achievements
Preceded by Nathan Gerbe	NCAA Tournament Most Outstanding Player; 2009	Succeeded by Ben Smith
