= Aleisha Cline =

Canadian cross skier

- Born: 10 September 1970 (age 56); Calgary

Aleisha Cline (born 10 September 1970) is a Canadian cross skier. The website of the International Olympic Committee describes her as a "living legend".

== Early life ==
Cline was born on 10 September 1970 in Calgary, Alberta and grew up in Kelowna, British Columbia.

== Career ==
Along with Ophélie David and Magdalena Jonsson, Cline holds the record for most medals won at the Winter X Games for skiing. She won gold medals in 1999, 2001, 2002, 2003 and a silver in 2004. Cline won a bronze at the 2005 Winter X Games. She has thrice won the FIS Ski Cross World Cup; two times during the 2003–04 season and once during the 2008–09 season. In the same world cup category, Cline has secured the second and third positions, thrice and twice, respectively.

After ski cross was introduced at the 2010 Winter Olympics, Cline came out of her retirement and participated in the test event organised in Cypress Mountain Ski Area. Her last world cup participation was in 2010 and she finished in the second position.

== Personal life ==
Cline is separated with two children. She took a break for 2 years from skicross for her family. She currently resides in Squamish, British Columbia.
