= Ingrid Berntsen =

Norwegian freestyle skier

Ingrid Berntsen (born 18 April 1978) is a Norwegian freestyle skier who specialized in the moguls. Her career peaked with good performances in the 2002–03 World Cup, but she never succeeded in the Olympic Games, and spent most of her career in the shadow of Kari Traa.

== Background ==
Ingrid Berntsen hails from Filtvet, and is the younger sister of skier Hedda Berntsen. She made her international debut in December 1995, in a European Cup race in Sölden when she finished among the top three before the season was over, with a third place in Altenmarkt-Zauchensee in January 1996.

== Career ==
In February in La Clusaz she made her World Cup debut. She continued racing in both cups, and in March 1997 she finished among the World Cup top fifteen for the first time, with a 14th place at Hundfjället. She then missed the 1997–98 season. She returned in early 1999, and her first placement among the top 10 came in January 1999, with a fourth place in the dual moguls race in Whistler Blackcomb. In the World Championships staged in Meiringen-Hasliberg in March the same year, she finished 20th in moguls and ninth in dual moguls.

In the 1999–00 season, Berntsen finished five times among the top 10; with three ninth places in dual moguls and two 10th places in moguls. In January 2001 she finished with a career best seventh place in the moguls competition in Deer Valley. In the World Championships staged in Whistler later that month, she only finished 21st in moguls and 17th in dual moguls. In January 2002, she again opened her season by recording a career best placement, finishing fourth in the moguls competition in Tignes. In March she finally won her first World Cup event, a dual moguls race in Madarao. Ingrid Berntsen was scheduled to compete in freestyle skiing at the 2002 Winter Olympics, while her sister Hedda was a candidate for the alpine skiing team. By competing in different sports at the same Olympic Games, the sisters were historic in a Norwegian context. Ingrid entered the moguls event, but did not reach the final, finishing 17th. Countryfellow Kari Traa won the race.

Berntsen continued her career with better performances in the 2002–03 season. She finished second in her third race of the season, in Madonna di Campiglio in December, and followed with another second place in Ruka the next week. Before the season was over, she had finished among the top five an additional seven times. In the World Championships staged in Deer Valley in February, she finished fifth in moguls and fourth in dual moguls. She then ended the season with a second place in a skicross World Cup race. However, due to injuries she did not retain her form, came the 2003–04 season. She performed consistently, but mostly finished in the range between 10 and 20. She then missed the entire 2004–05 season due to injury. The plans she harbored to compete more in skicross were effectively ruined.

Berntsen returned in the 2005–06 season, the goal of the season being the 2006 Winter Olympics. Having recorded two sixth places as her season's best, she entered the Olympic moguls race and finished 19th. She rounded off the season with three decent World Cup competitions in the moguls, as well as a third place in halfpipe. In the 2006–07 season she recorded four top-five placements, in both moguls, dual moguls and halfpipe. In the World Championships staged in Madonna di Campiglio in March 2007, she finished 10th in moguls and 12th in dual moguls. This was her last international competition.

In 2008, her sister Hedda, having retired as an alpine skier in 2003, successfully took up skicross.
