= Alisa Camplin =

Australian aerial skier (born 1974)

Alisa Camplin AM
Personal information
- Born: Alisa Peta Camplin-Warner; 10 November 1974 (age 51) Melbourne, Victoria, Australia
- Height: 157 cm (5 ft 2 in)
- Weight: 49 kg (108 lb)
Medal record
Women's freestyle skiing
Representing Australia
Olympic Games
Gold medal – first place	2002 Salt Lake City	Aerials
Bronze medal – third place	2006 Turin	Aerials
World Championships
Gold medal – first place	2003 Deer Valley	Aerials

Alisa Peta Camplin-Warner (born 10 November 1974) is an Australian former aerial skier who won gold at the 2002 Winter Olympics, the second ever winter Olympic gold medal for Australia. At the 2006 Winter Olympics, Camplin finished third to receive a bronze medal. She is the first Australian skier to win medals at consecutive Winter Olympics, making her one of Australia's best skiers.

== Background ==
Camplin is a former gymnast, standing at 157 cm tall. She was educated in Melbourne at the Methodist Ladies' College and has a bachelor's degree in information technology from Swinburne University of Technology. As a teenager, Alisa was an accomplished sailor, winning two Australian National Titles in the Hobie Cat catamaran class. Inspired by the example of three-time Olympian Kirstie Marshall, Camplin approached the Olympic Winter Institute of Australia in 1994 to see the possibilities of becoming an aerial skier. She was new to skiing, and even in Salt Lake she trampled on her victory flowers when she fell over during the trip to the winner's news conference.

Before the 2002 Winter Olympics, none of the dozen top 10 results she had made on the World Cup circuit included a victory, and compatriot Jacqui Cooper was viewed as the favourite for the aerials event. While most athletes use flags to mark the start of their jumps, Alisa used a wooden spoon. The rationale was that early in her career, confusion was caused by both Alisa and Jacqui using Australian flags to mark their starts, but in Australia a wooden spoon is a metaphorical prize for people or teams coming last in their sporting event.

== Salt Lake City 2002 ==
Alisa competed at the Olympics against doctors' advice—she had injured herself after being caught by a headwind in training a few weeks before. At the time, she was told she had bone bruising, it was not until she was examined by doctors in Salt Lake that she discovered both her ankles were fractured. The doctors were amazed that she was walking, let alone planning to jump.

Jacqui Cooper injured her knee in practice a week before the games. Camplin was so nervous she did not eat dinner the night before the final. Camplin performed a pair of triple-twisting, double backflip jumps to win the event.

Her family had been told to stay home by the athlete because she did not want distractions in the crowd, but her mother and younger sister Georgina defied her, watching her from behind a large Australian flag.

Camplin's gold was celebrated by Australia Post issuing a 45 cent stamp of her. Her stamp was issued on 22 February, four days after her victory. She received A$20,000 for the use of her image. Camplin was delighted, saying "For us to be put in with the summer Olympians who had their stamps and the previous 39 sporting legends who’ve had their stamps is amazing."

== Turin 2006 ==
In her preparations for the Turin Winter Olympics, Camplin incurred a serious knee injury in October 2005, requiring a knee reconstruction. To speed the healing process, she used the relatively uncommon practice of using donor tissue in the knee, and returned to limited training only 11 weeks after the surgery. She finished fourth at a World Cup event in Lake Placid to secure her place in the team.

On 22 February, in a night competition that was marked by a thick fog that disturbed competitions to an extent, Camplin registered a score of 94.99 in her first jump, the fourth best. In the second jump, she received a 96.40, which temporarily placed her second, a silver medal. She was, however, eventually dislodged by China's Li Nina, finishing third behind Switzerland's Evelyne Leu, who won the event, and Nina, who took silver. She also benefited from the unexpected fall of China's Xinxin Guo, who had received the highest score in the first jump and was expected to secure a place in the Olympic podium—at which time Camplin, who was already third then, would have gone out of the medal zone.

She was the Australian flag-bearer at the Opening Ceremony.

== Post-skiing career ==
Camplin announced her retirement from competition in July 2006. She intends to pursue interests in the media and in the ski travel industry.

As of 30 July 2006, she is an international executive for IBM, works as a motivational speaker, and does promotional and charity work. Camplin currently works as a senior executive at IBM managing a team of over 300 people. She has been the face of Wrigley's Extra chewing gum in Australia since shortly after the 2002 Winter Olympics. She is also a judge on the Australian television competition Torvill and Dean's Dancing on Ice, and runs Alisa Camplin Ski Tours.

On 4 November 2009, Alisa Camplin was one of 15 international torchbearers taking part in the relay's International media program, aimed at increasing global coverage of the cross-Canada relay. She ran on day 6 of the Vancouver 2010 Winter Olympic torch relay through the town of Dawson City in the Yukon Territory.

On 8 December 2009, it was announced that Alisa has joined the Collingwood Football Club board as a replacement for Sally Capp.

In 2024, Camplin was named as Australia's chef de mission for the 2026 games in Milano Cortina.

== Personal life ==
Camplin married Oliver Warner in December 2010. Their first child, Finnan Maximus Camplin-Warner, was born six weeks prematurely on 10 March 2011. Finnan died 10 days later due to a congenital heart condition. Camplin and Warner have set up the charity Finnan's Gift (http://finnansgift.com), organised through the Royal Children's Hospital, to raise money to buy equipment that will detect heart defects in other babies. On 3 October 2013, Camplin gave birth to their second child. On 20 July 2016, Camplin gave birth to their third child.

== Honours ==
Camplin received the Australian Sports Medal in 2000. She was awarded a Medal of the Order of Australia in 2003 for her 2002 gold medal win. In 2008, she was inducted into the Sport Australia Hall of Fame. In the 2019 Queen's Birthday Honours Camplin was appointed a Member of the Order of Australia in recognition of her "significant service to the community through support for paediatric health care".
