= Nate Roberts (skier) =

American freestyle skier

Medal record

Men's freestyle skiing

Representing the United States

World Championships
Gold medal – first place	2005 Ruka	Moguls
Bronze medal – third place	2007 Madonna di Campiglio	Moguls

Nathan Roberts (born March 24, 1982) (nickname "Nate Dog") is an American freestyle skier who has competed since 1999. He won two medals at the FIS Freestyle World Ski Championships with a gold in 2005 and a bronze in 2007.

Roberts also won ten World Cup victories in moguls from 2003 to 2007.

He was named to the US team for the 2010 Winter Olympics in January 2010. Roberts is known in the freestyle world as the first skier to perform a double back flip, which is not sanctioned by the F.I.S. because it is considered too dangerous. He did display the jump in 2005 at an exhibition in Are, Sweden, one week before winning the World Championships in Ruka, Finland.

He is also known for performing the "Natedog", i.e., a backflip with a full 360 twist, which was accepted by the F.I.S. as a sanctioned aerial move.

Roberts is also a prolific golfer, and was ranked 6th(tied with NHL hockey player Brett Hull) in the World by Golf Digest in 2009 in "Celebrity Golfers" rankings. He graduated from Golf Academy of America in Carlsbad, California, in August, 2014, and is currently an Assistant Golf Professional at the Park City Golf Course in Park City, Utah. Nate's current goal is to complete his Manager on Duty hours and to ultimately qualify for his Class A PGA card, for the purpose of becoming a teaching pro.

Roberts was born in Ogden, Utah, raised in Park City, Utah, and currently resides in Park City. .
