= Magdalena Iljans =

Swedish freestyle skier

Personal information
- Born: 26 September 1969 (age 56) Kungsängen, Sweden

Skiing career
- Sport: Alpine skiing
- Retired: 23 February 2010 (age 40)
- Disciplines: Ski cross
- World Cup debut: 30 November 2002 (age 33)

Olympics
- Teams: 1 – (2010)

World Championships
- Teams: 3 – (2005–2009)
- Medals: 1

World Cup
- Seasons: 8 – (2003–2010)
- Wins: 7
- Podiums: 13
Medal record
Women's freestyle skiing
Representing Sweden
World Championships
Silver medal – second place	2005 Ruka	Ski Cross
- Updated on 31 July 2013

Anna Magdalena Iljans, née Jonsson (born 26 September 1969) is a Swedish freestyle skier, specializing in ski cross.

Iljans competed at the 2010 Winter Olympics for Sweden. She placed 11th in the qualifying round in ski cross, to advance to the knockout stages. She finished second in her first round heat, advancing to the quarterfinals. She did not finish her quarterfinal race, failing to advance. Retiring from ski cross because of injuries, she is now working as a school principal.

As of April 2013, Iljans has one medal finish at the World Championships. She won a silver medal, in 2005, the first World Championships at which ski cross was contested. She qualified third overall, then won both her first round and semifinal races, before finishing behind Karin Huttary in the final.

Iljans made her World Cup debut in November 2002. As of April 2013, she has seven World Cup victories, the first coming in her debut race at Tignes in 2002/03. Her best World Cup overall finish in ski cross is 2nd, in 2002/03 and 2006/07.

== World Cup podiums ==
7 wins, 13 podiums

Date	Location	Rank	Event
30 November 2002	Tigens	1st place, gold medalist(s)	Ski cross
18 January 2003	Laax	1st place, gold medalist(s)	Ski cross
23 November 2003	Saas-Fee	3rd place, bronze medalist(s)	Ski cross
18 January 2004	Laax	1st place, gold medalist(s)	Ski cross
31 January 2004	Spindleruv Mlyn	3rd place, bronze medalist(s)	Ski cross
21 February 2004	Naeba	2nd place, silver medalist(s)	Ski cross
15 January 2005	Pozza di Fassa	1st place, gold medalist(s)	Ski cross
5 March 2005	Grindelwald	3rd place, bronze medalist(s)	Ski cross
14 January 2006	Les Contamines	3rd place, bronze medalist(s)	Ski cross
20 January 2006	Kirschberg	1st place, gold medalist(s)	Ski cross
12 March 2006	Sierra Nevada	1st place, gold medalist(s)	Ski cross
10 January 2007	Flaine	1st place, gold medalist(s)	Ski cross
16 February 2007	Inawashiro	2nd place, silver medalist(s)	Ski cross
