= Fredrik Fortkord =

Swedish freestyle skier (born 1979)

Personal information
- Nationality: Swedish
- Born: 12 October 1979 (age 47) Saltsjöbaden, Sweden

Sport
- Sport: Freestyle skiing

Fredrik Fortkord (born 12 October 1979) is a Swedish freestyle skier. He competed at the 2002 Winter Olympics and the 2006 Winter Olympics.
