= Jillian Vogtli =

American freestyle skier

Jillian Rachell Vogtli (born May 26, 1973) was a two-time Olympian and athlete on the U.S. Ski Team; she competed in the freestyle skiing events of moguls and dual moguls.

== Early years ==
Vogtli was born in Buffalo, New York, and started skiing at the age of 10 at Holiday Valley (ski resort), near Buffalo. She attended and played soccer at the State University of New York at Brockport, graduating in 1996.

== United States Ski Team ==
By winning the Moguls circuit on the Nor-Am Cup in 1996, she earned a spot on the US Ski Team. Shortly afterward, she competed in her first World Cup on January 12, 1997 in Lake Placid, New York, where she placed 8th in Moguls.

A two-time Olympian, she competed in the Salt Lake City Olympic Games in 2002 and the Turin, Italy Olympic Games in 2006. She placed 18th in Moguls in Salt Lake, and 11th in Moguls in Italy.

In 110 World Cup starts, she had 8 podiums, including one victory in Moguls in Inawashiro on February 5, 2005.

She competed in seven FIS Freestyle World Ski Championships, and she placed in the top-10 in all of them except her first, when she placed 13th. Her best finishes in the FIS Freestyle World Ski Championships were 6th place in Moguls and Dual Moguls, in 2005 and 2007, respectively.

She is also a two-time US National Champion.

Vogtli is one of the few women skiers on the Moguls World Cup who performs the very difficult D-Spin aerial maneuver (somewhat inverted 720).

== Later years ==
Vogtli now sells and designs jewelry (her retail web site is jewelrybyjillian.com), and she is completing her doctorate in Natural Health.
