= Martin Walti =

Swiss freestyle skier

Personal information
- Nationality: Swiss
- Born: 9 January 1982 (age 43); Schlieren, Switzerland

Sport
- Sport: Freestyle skiing

Martin Walti (born 9 January 1982) is a Swiss freestyle skier. He competed in the men's aerials event at the 2002 Winter Olympics.
