= Marc-André Moreau =

Canadian freestyle skier

Medal record

Men's freestyle skiing

Representing Canada

FIS Freestyle World Ski Championships
Silver medal – second place	2005 Ruka	Moguls

Marc-André Moreau (born January 22, 1982, in Chambly, Quebec) is a Canadian freestyle skier.

Moreau, a mogulist has placed in the top-3 in World Cup events on three occasions. In 2004, he won a World Cup event in Mont-Tremblant, Quebec, and he picked up a silver medal at the 2005 moguls world championships in Ruka, Finland.

At the 2006 Winter Olympics, Moreau placed fourth in the Moguls event.
