= Hiroomi Takizawa =

Japanese freestyle skier (born 1973)

Personal information
- Born: 13 September 1973 (age 52)

Sport
- Sport: Skiing

World Cup career
- Seasons: 1996–1999 (mogul); 2005–2009 (skicross)
Medal record
Men's freestyle skiing
Representing Japan
Winter X Games
Silver medal – second place	2009 Aspen	Ski Cross

Hiroomi Takizawa (瀧澤 宏臣, Takizawa Hiroomi; born 13 September 1973) is a Japanese freestyle skier who specializes in the skicross discipline. He is a former moguls skier.

== Moguls ==
Takizawa competed three seasons in the moguls discipline. He made his debut in the so-called Nor-Am Cup in December 1996 with a sixth place in Fortress Mountain. He followed up with a fourteenth and sixteenth place in Deer Valley, and a 28th and sixth place in Le Relais. In the 1997–98 he competed less. He made his World Cup debut in December, but finished 65th. In the 1998–99 he started off with good results in the so-called European Cup, then participated in four races in Japan in February. With two thirtieth places in Inawashiro and two 29th places in Madarao he collected his first and only World Cup points.

== Skicross ==
Takizawa later switched to skicross, and made his World Cup debut in January 2005 with a twelfth place in Pozza di Fassa. He followed up with good results in the 2005–06 season, with the best being a seventh place from Sierra Nevada in March. In the 2006–07 season he only competed twice, but finished second and first in the two races. He also competed at the 2007 World Championships, but with limited success. In the 2007–08 season he finished among the top fifteen in seven out of eight World Cup outings. The 2008–09 season was opened with an abysmal 60th place in St. Johann in January, but he returned five days later to record a thirteenth place in Les Contamines.
