= Margarita Marbler =

Austrian freestyle skier

Personal information
- Born: 16 July 1975 (age 51) Petropavlovsk-Kamchatsky, Soviet Union

Skiing career
- Sport: Alpine skiing
- Club: Freestyle-Club Villach
- Disciplines: Moguls, dual moguls
- World Cup debut: 9 January 1999

Olympics
- Teams: 3 – (2002, 2006, 2010)

World Championships
- Teams: 5 – (2001–2009)
- Medals: 3

World Cup
- Wins: 7
- Podiums: 36
Medal record
Women's freestyle skiing
Representing Austria
World Championships
| Bronze medal – third place | 2005 Ruka | Moguls |
| Bronze medal – third place | 2007 Madonna | Dual Moguls |

Margarita Marbler (born 16 July 1975) is a retired Austrian freestyle moguls skier, originally from Russia. She's been included in three Winter Olympic Games; at Salt Lake City, Turin and Vancouver. She has competed in both the Moguls and Dual Moguls event, as well as the Acrobatics and Aerials events. Marbler uses Elan skis, Dalbello Boots and Exel ski poles.

== Professional career ==
=== FIS World Cup and Championships ===
Marbler made her debut at the International Youth Championship event on 6 March 1994 in Laajavuori, Finland in both the Aerials and Moguls event. That same December, she made her first World Cup start in Tignes, France. Marbler finally broke through with her first podium in 1999, finishing second at a Moguls event in Japan. Her best World Championships result was third in 2005 and 2007, at Rukatunturi and Madonna di Campiglio respectively.

=== Olympics ===
Marbler has made it to the Winter Olympics three times, all in the Moguls event. She made her Olympic debut in 2002 at the Salt Lake City Olympics. She ultimately finished in tenth place there. Marbler could not improve on her tenth place finish four years later in Turin, placing seventeenth. She was able to improve on her Salt Lake City result with her Olympic best result, finishing eighth.

== Personal life ==
Marbler was born in Russia, but became an Austrian citizen following her marriage with her husband Harald in 1995. Harald is also Margarita's coach. Her hobbies include watching television, playing with her Game Boys and knitting.

=== World Cup victories ===
7 victories (6 Moguls, 1 Dual Moguls)

| Date | Location | Race |
|---|---|---|
| 12 January 2002 | (France) Tignes | Moguls |
| 23 February 2003 | (Japan) Madarao | Moguls |
| 14 February 2004 | (Japan) Inawashiro | Moguls |
| 15 February 2004 | (Japan) Inawashiro | Dual Moguls |
| 13 December 2007 | (France) Tignes | Moguls |
| 13 February 2009 | (Sweden) Åre | Moguls |
| 18 March 2009 | (France) La Plagne | Moguls |
