= FIS Freestyle World Ski Championships 2005 =

The 2005 FIS Freestyle World Ski Championships took place at the Rukatunturi ski resort in Kuusamo, Finland, between March 17th and March 20th. Five events were held for each sex, including half-pipe, skicross, aerials, moguls and dual moguls.

== Results ==
=== Men's Results ===
==== Half-Pipe ====
The men's event took place on March 17.

Medal	Name	Nation	Result
1st place, gold medalist(s)	Mathias Wecxsteen	France	47.00
2nd place, silver medalist(s)	Loic Collumb-Patton	France	46.70
3rd place, bronze medalist(s)	Corey Vanular	Canada	44.00

==== Ski Cross ====
The men's event took place on March 18.

Medal	Name	Nation
1st place, gold medalist(s)	Tomas Kraus	Czech Republic
2nd place, silver medalist(s)	Jesper Brugge	Sweden
3rd place, bronze medalist(s)	Audun Groenvold	Norway

==== Aerials ====
The men's event took place on March 18.

Medal	Name	Nation	Result
1st place, gold medalist(s)	Steve Omischl	Canada	258.98
2nd place, silver medalist(s)	Jeff Bean	Canada	253.61
3rd place, bronze medalist(s)	Alexei Grishin	Belarus	246.19

==== Moguls ====
The men's event took place on March 19.

Medal	Name	Nation	Result
1st place, gold medalist(s)	Nathan Roberts	United States	26.90
2nd place, silver medalist(s)	Marc-Andre Moreau	Canada	26.83
3rd place, bronze medalist(s)	Dale Begg-Smith	Australia	26.75

==== Dual Moguls ====
The men's event took place on March 20.

Medal	Name	Nation
1st place, gold medalist(s)	Toby Dawson	United States
2nd place, silver medalist(s)	Sami Mustonen	Finland
3rd place, bronze medalist(s)	Jeremy Bloom	United States

=== Women's Results ===
==== Half-Pipe ====
The women's event took place on March 17.

Medal	Name	Nation	Result
1st place, gold medalist(s)	Sarah Burke	Canada	44.00
2nd place, silver medalist(s)	Kristi Leskinen	United States	39.70
3rd place, bronze medalist(s)	Grethe Eliassen	Norway	38.20

==== Ski Cross ====
The women's event took place on March 18.

Medal	Name	Nation
1st place, gold medalist(s)	Karin Huttary	Austria
2nd place, silver medalist(s)	Magdelina Iljans	Sweden
3rd place, bronze medalist(s)	Ophelie David	France

==== Aerials ====
The women's event took place on March 18.

Medal	Name	Nation	Result
1st place, gold medalist(s)	Li Nina	China	197.37
2nd place, silver medalist(s)	Evelyne Leu	Switzerland	196.01
3rd place, bronze medalist(s)	Guo Xinxin	China	183.94

==== Moguls ====
The women's event took place on March 19.

Medal	Name	Nation	Result
1st place, gold medalist(s)	Hannah Kearney	United States	26.40
2nd place, silver medalist(s)	Nikola Sudová	Czech Republic	26.31
3rd place, bronze medalist(s)	Margarita Marbler	Austria	26.31

==== Dual Moguls ====
The women's event took place on March 20.

Medal	Name	Nation
1st place, gold medalist(s)	Jennifer Heil	Canada
2nd place, silver medalist(s)	Kari Traa	Norway
3rd place, bronze medalist(s)	Aiko Uemura	Japan
