= Ou Xiaotao =

Chinese freestyle skier

Personal information
- Nationality: Chinese
- Born: 11 February 1980 (age 45); Fushun, China

Sport
- Sport: Freestyle skiing

Ou Xiaotao (born 11 February 1980) is a Chinese freestyle skier. He competed at the 1998 Winter Olympics, the 2002 Winter Olympics, and the 2006 Winter Olympics.
