= Freestyle skiing at the 2002 Winter Olympics =

Freestyle skiing at the XIX Olympic Winter Games
- Venue: Deer Valley; Park City, Utah; United States
- Dates: 9–19 February
- Competitors: 105 from 21 nations

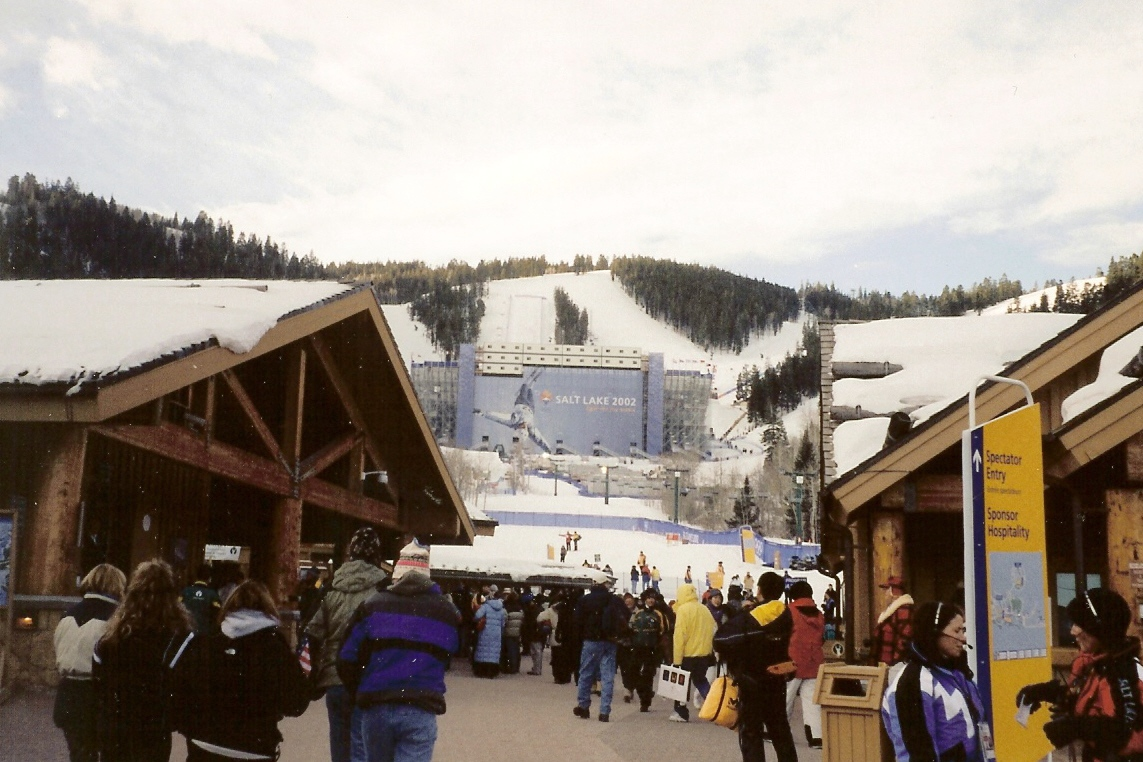
Olympic Aerials Venue at Deer Valley Resort at the 2002 Olympic Games.

Four freestyle skiing events were held at the 2002 Winter Olympics in Salt Lake City, at the venue in Deer Valley. There were both men's and women's competition in both aerials and moguls events. In moguls, the athletes ski down a slope littered with moguls (bumps), attempting to get down in as fast a time as possible while also attempting to get points for technique and their two aerial jumps during the course. The aerials events consisted of two jumps, which were judged by air, form and landing.

== Medal summary ==
=== Medal table ===
Rank	Nation	Gold	Silver	Bronze	Total
1	Australia	1	0	0	1
1	Czech Republic	1	0	0	1
1	Finland	1	0	0	1
1	Norway	1	0	0	1
5	United States	0	3	0	3
6	Canada	0	1	1	2
7	Belarus	0	0	1	1
7	France	0	0	1	1
7	Japan	0	0	1	1
Totals (9 entries)		4	4	4	12

=== Men’s events ===
Event	Gold		Silver		Bronze	
moguls	Janne Lahtela; Finland	27.97	Travis Mayer; United States	27.59	Richard Gay; France	26.91
aerials	Aleš Valenta; Czech Republic	257.02	Joe Pack; United States	251.64	Alexei Grishin; Belarus	251.19

=== Women’s events ===
Event	Gold		Silver		Bronze	
moguls	Kari Traa; Norway	25.94	Shannon Bahrke; United States	25.06	Tae Satoya; Japan	24.85
aerials	Alisa Camplin; Australia	193.47	Veronica Brenner; Canada	190.02	Deidra Dionne; Canada	189.26

== Participating NOCs ==
Twenty-one nations competed in the freestyle skiing events at Salt Lake City.

- Argentina (1)
- Australia (7)
- Austria (1)
- Belarus (5)
- Canada (14)
- China (7)
- Czech Republic (2)
- Denmark (1)
- Finland (4)
- France (6)
- Great Britain (3)
- Italy (1)
- Japan (8)
- Kazakhstan (1)
- Norway (3)
- Russia (12)
- Slovenia (1)
- Sweden (4)
- Switzerland (6)
- Ukraine (3)
- United States (14)
