= Enak Gavaggio =

French freestyle skier

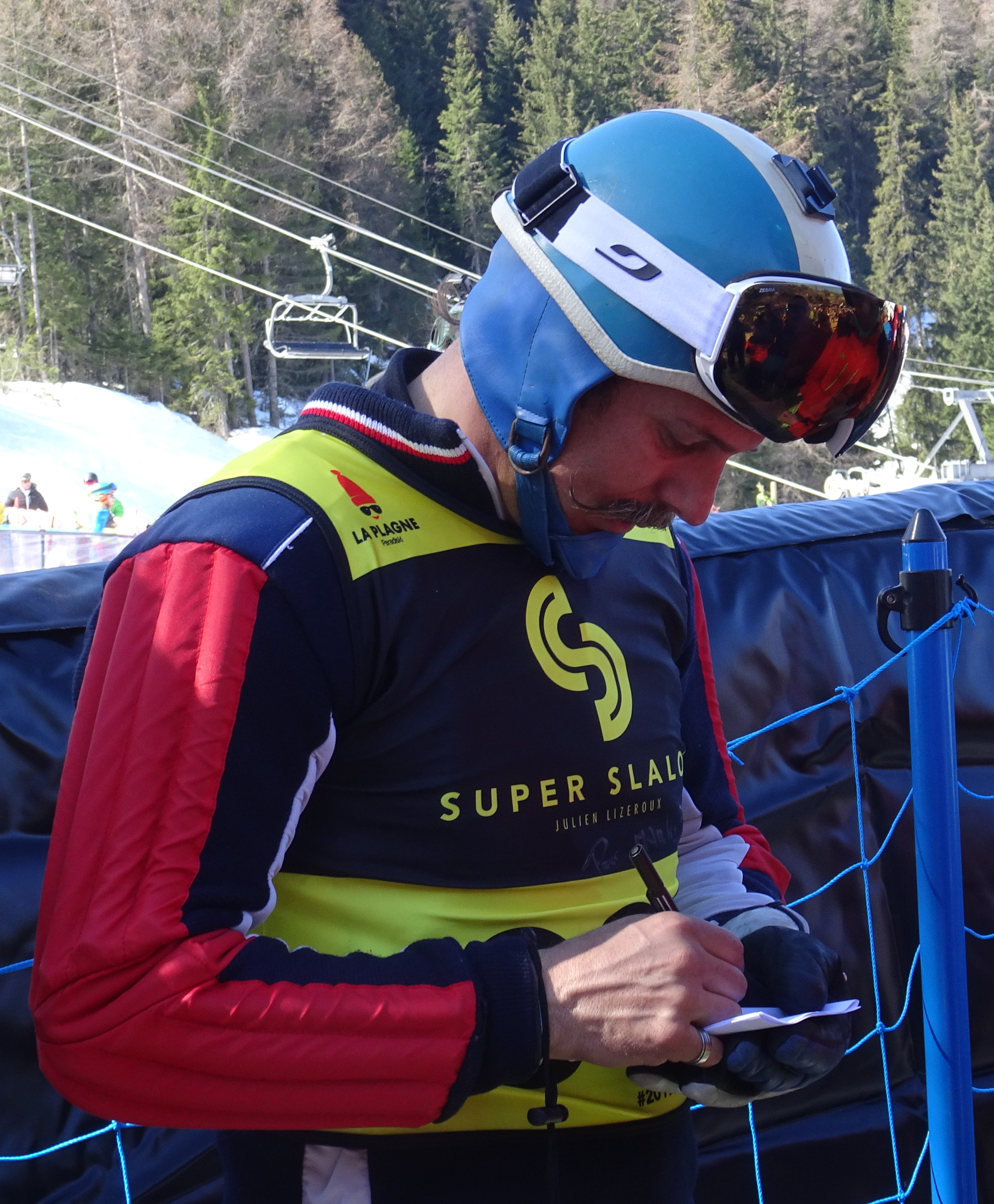
- Gavaggio in 2019 at Super Slalom de La Plagne

Personal information
- Nationality: French
- Born: 4 May 1976 (age 48)

Sport
- Sport: Freestyle skiing

Enak Gavaggio (born May 4, 1976) is a French freestyle skier. He represented France at the 2010 Winter Olympics in Vancouver. Some of his noteworthy achievements include: 7 skier-cross medals at the X-Games, 1 medal at the World Championship, 5x skicross world cup winner, and a 4th and 5th place at the Freeride World Tour Championship.
