= Travis Mayer =

American freestyle skier

Personal information
- Full name: Travis Mayer
- Born: February 22, 1982 (age 44) Buffalo, New York, U.S.

Sport
- Sport: Skiing
- Club: Steamboat Springs Winter Sports Club

World Cup career
- Seasons: 2001-2006
- Indiv. podiums: 11
- Indiv. wins: 1

Medal record

Men's freestyle skiing

Representing the United States

Olympic Games
Silver medal – second place	2002 Salt Lake City	Moguls

Travis Mayer (born February 22, 1982, in Buffalo, New York) is an Olympic-level freestyle skier. He won the silver medal in the moguls competition at the 2002 Winter Olympics and also competed in the 2006 Winter Olympics.

== Early life and education ==
Travis grew up skiing in Western New York at Holiday Valley and across the Northeast as a member of the Holiday Valley Freestyle Team. After completing junior high school in Orchard Park, as a freshman in high school he went to Killington Mountain School in Vermont for five months to concentrate on his skiing. Mayer moved to Steamboat Springs, Colorado, to attend the Lowell Whiteman School.

In the fall of his junior year, at 16, Mayer was named a member of the US Ski Team. Mayer continued to pursue skiing at an elite level, but by 2000 began to want to take a break from skiing and explore other life avenues. In January 2001, Mayer returned to full-time skiing and his development further accelerated. He barely made the Olympic team a few months prior, and ended up taking silver at the Salt Lake City Games in 2002. Subsequently, he won his first World Cup event, in 2005 at Lake Placid.

== Career ==
Mayer studied food science and planned to go into the same cider and bottled water that his family has owned for 150 years.

In June 2005, Mayer was involved in a two-car accident in Wales, New York. The accident resulted in the death of the occupant of the other vehicle. The police concluded that Mayer was not using drugs or alcohol, and he was not charged with a crime. He was given a citation for failing to yield at a stop sign.

In January 2006, Mayer was named to the U.S. Olympic team for Torino. He finished in seventh place.

Mayer became the chief financial officer at Intrawest ULC in March 2012, after joining Intrawest in 2007. He started as a financial analyst in July 2010. He served as executive vice president of operations and business development at Intrawest from January 2014 to January 2015. He was involved with the outdoor sports and leisure travel industries. Mayer has an MBA from Harvard Business School and a BS from Cornell University, where he graduated summa cum laude. He currently resides in Steamboat Springs, Colorado.

His most famous trick was the straight 720 spin.

== Other sources ==
- Official website
- US Ski Team biography
- NBC Olympics biography
- Ted's U.S. Olympic Team bio
- US Ski Team Press Release
- Wallechinsky, David and Jaime Loucky (2009). "Freestyle Skiing, Men: Moguls". In The Complete Book of the Winter Olympics: 2010 Edition. London: Aurum Press Limited. p. 302.
