= Assol Slivets =

Belarusian freestyle skier

Assol Vitalyevna Slivets (Russian: Ассоль Витальевна Сливец; born 22 June 1982), also known under the nickname Assol "Oly" Slivets, is a Belarusian, and later Russian freestyle skier. She competed for Belarus until 2011, and then switched to Russia.

She has participated at two Olympic Games in the Aerial event. She came fifth at the 2006 Olympics and reached the finals at the 2010 Olympics.

She won a bronze at the 2007 World Ski Championships in the Aerials event.

She made the podium at five of her first 53 World Cup events.

Her hometown club in Minsk was the Republican Centre for Physical Education and Sports. Later she moved to Sochi. Assol Slivets is a sister of a freestyle skier Timofei Slivets.
