= Dmitry Arkhipov (skier) =

Russian freestyle skier

Personal information
- Nationality: Russian
- Born: 1 April 1981 (age 44) Chirchiq, Uzbekistan

Sport
- Sport: Freestyle skiing

Dmitry Nikolayevich Arkhipov (Russian: Дмитрий Николаевич Архипов; born 1 April 1981) is a Russian freestyle skier who was born in the Uzbek Soviet Socialist Republic. He competed at the 2002 Winter Olympics and the 2006 Winter Olympics.
