= Anna Zukal =

Russian freestyle skier

Personal information
- Born: 7 October 1985 (age 39); Tashkent, Uzbek SSR, Soviet Union

Sport
- Country: Russia
- Sport: Freestyle skiing

Anna Zukal (born 7 October 1985) is a Russian freestyle skier. She was born in Tashkent. She competed at the 2002 Winter Olympics, where she placed sixth in women's aerials. She also competed at the 2006 Winter Olympics.
