= Jeremy Bloom =

American skier and football player (born 1982)

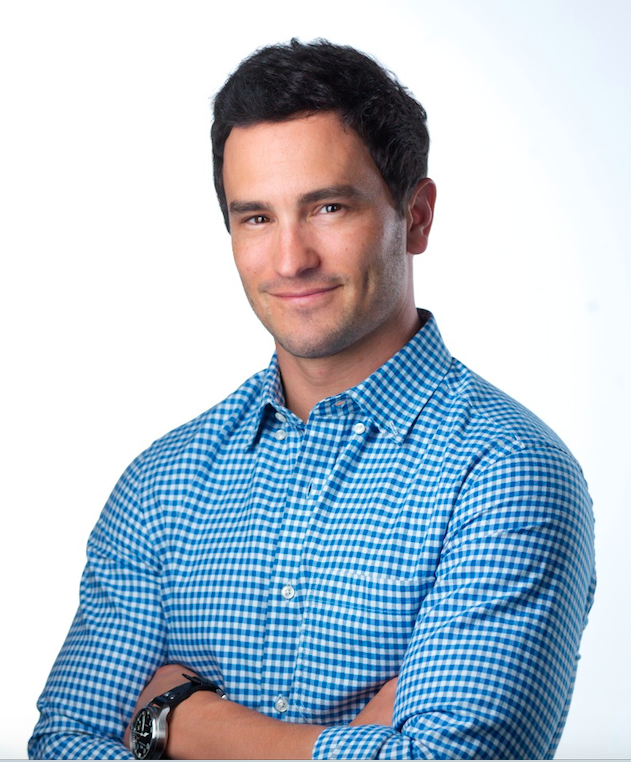
- Bloom in 2016
- Born: April 2, 1982 (age 44); Fort Collins, Colorado, U.S.
- Relatives: Molly Bloom (sister); Colby Cohen (cousin)
- Football career

Profile
- Positions: Wide receiver, return specialist

Personal information
- Listed height: 5 ft 9 in (1.75 m)
- Listed weight: 180 lb (82 kg)

Career information
- High school: Loveland (CO)
- College: Colorado
- NFL draft: 2006: 5th round, 147th overall pick

Career history
- Philadelphia Eagles (2006); Pittsburgh Steelers (2007–2008)*
- * Offseason or practice squad member only

Jeremy Bloom (born April 2, 1982) is an American former skier and football player. As a skier, he is a one-time world champion, two-time Olympian, and 10-time World Cup gold medalist. He was inducted into the National Ski Hall of Fame in 2013.

Bloom was a Freshman All-American at the University of Colorado. He was selected by the Philadelphia Eagles in the 2006 NFL draft and was also a member of the Pittsburgh Steelers, but did not play in a regular season game for either team. Bloom later went into business.

== Personal life ==
Bloom was born in Fort Collins, Colorado, the son of Charlene, a ski and fly fishing instructor, and Larry Bloom, a clinical psychologist; Jeremy grew up in nearby Loveland. Bloom's father is Jewish but his mother is not. His older sister, Molly Bloom, is an author and former member of the U.S. Ski Team, dubbed the "Poker Princess" by the tabloid press for organizing high-stakes underground poker games that attracted A-list actors and other celebrities; her 2014 memoir was adapted into the 2017 film Molly's Game. Jeremy's cousin is ice hockey player Colby Cohen.

== Skiing career ==
Jeremy Bloom
Medal record
Men's freestyle skiing
Representing United States
World Championships
Gold medal – first place	2003 Deer Valley	Dual Moguls
Silver medal – second place	2003 Deer Valley	Moguls
Bronze medal – third place	2005 Kuusamo	Dual Moguls

Bloom grew up skiing in Keystone, Colorado. At 15 he became the youngest male freestyle skier to ever make the United States Ski Team.

He competed in Moguls at the 2002 and 2006 Winter Olympics, placing 9th in the former and 6th in the latter.

On November 24, 2008, Bloom announced his intention to attend the United States ski team's training camp to assess the possibility of a 2010 return to Olympic skiing.

Bloom was featured in The Weight of Gold (2020), an HBO Sports Documentary which "explor(es) the mental health challenges that Olympic athletes often face."

== College football career ==
Bloom was a wide receiver and punt returner for the University of Colorado football team. He was selected for the first-team Freshman All-America list by the FWAA.

On October 5, 2002, Bloom caught a pass from Robert Hodge against Kansas State in Boulder that resulted in a 94-yard touchdown, setting four Colorado team records: all-time longest passing play, longest scoring play from scrimmage, longest gain on a first career reception, and longest gain by a freshman.

He also holds the Colorado team record for most combined return yards (kick & punt) in a single game, set against Baylor University in Waco, Texas on October 4, 2003 (143 kickoff and 107 punt).

Bloom's college football career was cut short when the NCAA ruled him ineligible due to his acceptance of sponsorships for his Olympic skiing career, which violated amateurism rules. Despite appeals by Bloom and the University of Colorado, the NCAA upheld the decision, effectively ending his football career and sparking debate about its impact on athletes pursuing dual-sport careers.

== Professional football career ==
Pre-draft measurables
Height	Weight	Arm length	Hand span	40-yard dash	10-yard split	20-yard split
5 ft 9 in (1.75 m)	173 lb (78 kg)	28 1/2 in (0.72 m)	9 in (0.23 m)	4.53 s	1.56 s	2.62 s
All values from NFL Combine

=== Philadelphia Eagles ===
On April 30, 2006, Bloom was selected by the Philadelphia Eagles in the fifth round (147th overall) of the 2006 NFL draft. He was featured in the NFL TV show Hey Rookie, Welcome To The NFL. He practiced with the team all through mini-camp as a punt and kick returner, but injured his hamstring during training camp, placing him on injured reserve. Bloom remained with the team for the 2006 season. After spending his entire rookie year on injured reserve, Bloom averaged 20.3 yards on 12 kickoff returns and 7.8 yards on 10 punt returns during the 2007 preseason. He was released by the Eagles prior to the regular season.

=== Pittsburgh Steelers ===
On December 31, 2007, Bloom was signed by the Pittsburgh Steelers in preparation for the 2008 AFC playoff game against the Jacksonville Jaguars. He began 2008 training camp with the Steelers. He was released by the Steelers on August 25, 2008.

== Other ventures ==
In the 2000s, Bloom was a DJ for MTV.

In March 2003, Bloom won the 30th annual CBS Superstars competition in Jamaica; he defeated nine professional athletes including Dexter Jackson, Ahman Green, and Will Allen.

In April 2010, Bloom, with Hart Cunningham, co-founded a marketing software company, Integrate.

In 2012, Bloom participated in the dating game show The Choice.

As of 2018, Bloom is a college football and Olympic sports television analyst and has worked for ESPN, Fox, NBC and the Pac-12 Network.

In 2018, Bloom was named as a member of an exploratory committee for a possible bid for Denver to host a Winter Olympics.

In December 2024, Bloom was made CEO of the X Games organization.
