= Toby Dawson =

South Korean-American mogul skier (born 1979)

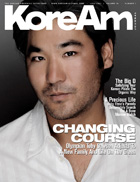
- On the cover of KoreAm, July 2007

Personal information
- Nationality: United States; South Korea
- Born: May 4, 1979 (age 47) Busan, South Korea
Medal record
Men's freestyle skiing
Representing the United States
Olympic Games
Bronze medal – third place	2006 Turin	Moguls
World Championships
Gold medal – first place	2005 Ruka	Dual Moguls
Bronze medal – third place	2003 Deer Valley	Moguls
Bronze medal – third place	2003 Deer Valley	Dual Moguls

Toby Dawson (Korean: 김수철; Kim Soo-cheol; born Kim Bong-seok; 김봉석; May 4, 1979) is a Korean-American retired mogul skier. He won a bronze medal at the 2006 Winter Olympics. Dawson is a featured athlete on the sports medicine show Athlete 360. He is currently a coach for the Korean national freestyle skiing team.

== Early life ==
Dawson was born in Busan, South Korea as Kim Bong-seok. When he was three, then-Kim Bong-seok was at a crowded Jungang market in Beomil-dong, Dong-gu, Busan with his mother and went missing. His father went through many orphanages in the area for days, and his son was nowhere to be found. A couple from Vail, Colorado, who were ski instructors, adopted Kim Bong-seok and he was renamed Toby Dawson.

== Reunion with biological parents ==
A man from Busan, Kim Jae-su (김재수), saw Dawson's image in the media; Kim had a missing son of Dawson's age, a DNA test has proven that Jae-su is indeed Dawson's biological father. Dawson and Kim met in Seoul for the first time on Wednesday, February 28, 2007, along with Kim's younger son. Dawson has stated his intent to start a foundation, named after his birth name, to prevent such cases in the future. After the reunion, Kim, Dawson, and his biological younger brother had lunch.

Dawson met his biological mother on Friday, November 2, 2012, in Busan, South Korea, according to his Twitter, with his biological father and brother.

He is a PR ambassador for Korea National Tourism Organization and the 2014, 2018 Pyeongchang Olympic Winter Games Bid Committee.

== Personal life ==
Dawson married Leah Halmi on March 14, 2007, in Palm Springs, California. They held a second wedding ceremony on May 24, 2007, in Busan, South Korea. Dawson and his wife were featured on the WE TV show "Platinum Weddings," which premiered on June 24, 2007. The couple wrote a book together, Twenty-Two Years for Twenty-Two Seconds. They divorced in 2009.

On September 14, 2013, Dawson married Kim Yeon-ji, a former member of the South Korean national taekwondo team in Seoul. Kim won the World Taekwondo Championships twice in 2001 and 2003.
