= Guo Xinxin =

Chinese freestyle skier

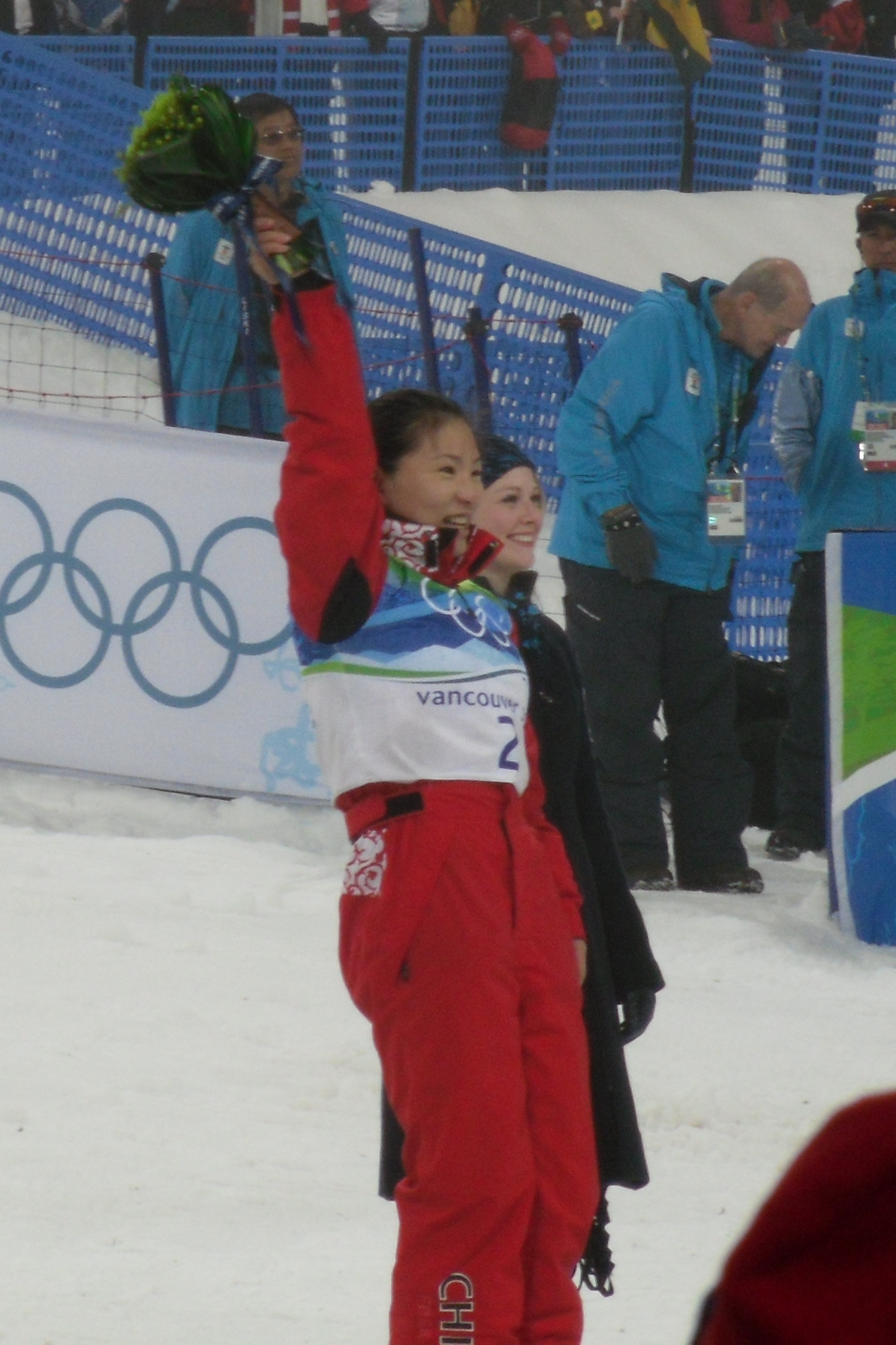
- Guo Xinxin at the 2010 Winter Olympics

Medal record

Women's freestyle skiing

Representing China

Olympic Games
Bronze medal – third place	2010 Vancouver	Aerials

Guo Xinxin (born August 2, 1983) is a Chinese aerial skier who competed in the 2002 Winter Olympics and the 2006 Winter Olympics. She competed for China at the 2010 Winter Olympics as well and won the bronze medal in the aerials event.
