= Joe Pack =

American freestyle skier

Personal information
- Born: April 10, 1978 (age 48) Eugene, Oregon, U.S.
Medal record
Men's freestyle skiing
Representing the United States
Olympic Games
Silver medal – second place	2002 Salt Lake City	Aerials
World Championships
Bronze medal – third place	1999 Meiringen-Hasliberg	Aerials
Bronze medal – third place	2001 Whistler	Aerials

Joe Pack (born April 10, 1978) is an American freestyle skier and Olympic medalist. He received a silver medal at the 2002 Winter Olympics in Salt Lake City, in aerials.

Pack is a Latter-day Saint. He was born in Eugene, Oregon. Joe was inducted into the US Ski and Snowboard Hall of Fame in 2001. Pack lives in Hawaii as the Head Golf Professional at Turtle Bay Resort. He is married to jewelry designer Vanessa Pack (née Gardiner). They got married at the historic Maidstone Club in 2008. They have one daughter Gabriella, and a German Shepherd named Oso. Joe is also an avid Red Sox fan.
