= Karin Huttary =

Austrian freestyle skier (born 1977)

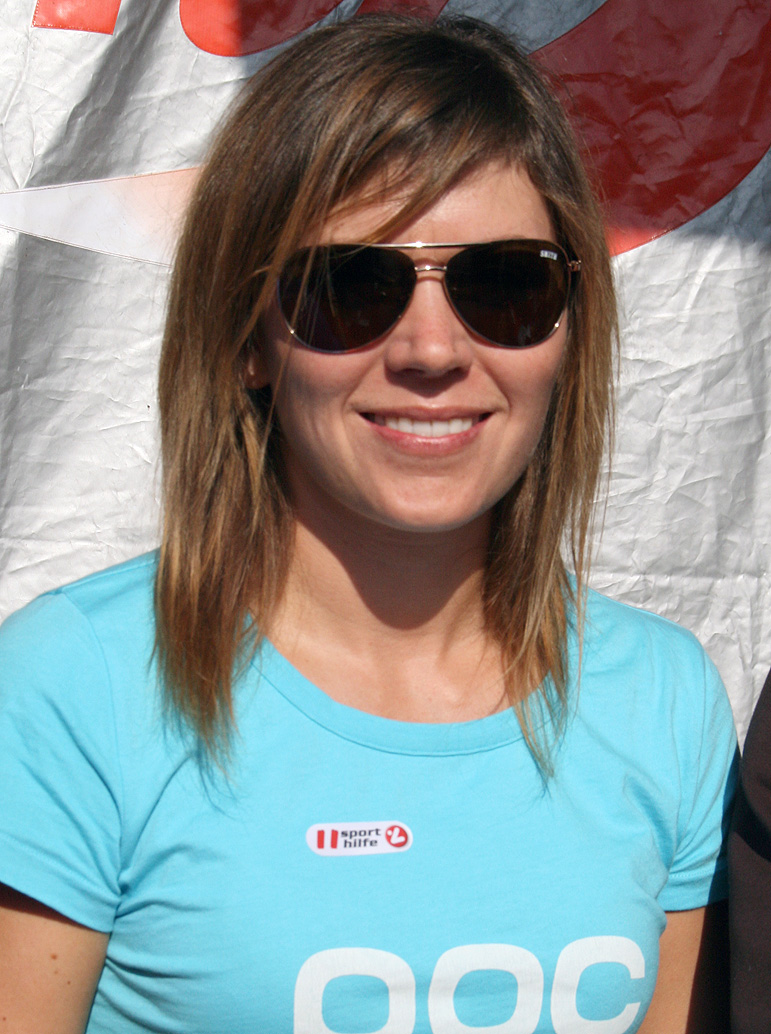
Huttary in 2009

Karin Huttary (born 23 May 1977 in Innsbruck) is an Austrian freestyle skier who won a silver medal at the FIS Freestyle World Ski Championships 2009 in ski-cross. Although an Austrian she was once a member of the Swedish ski team, but switched to ski-cross and will compete for Austria at the 2010 Winter Olympics.
