= Evelyne Leu =

Swiss freestyle skier (born 1976)

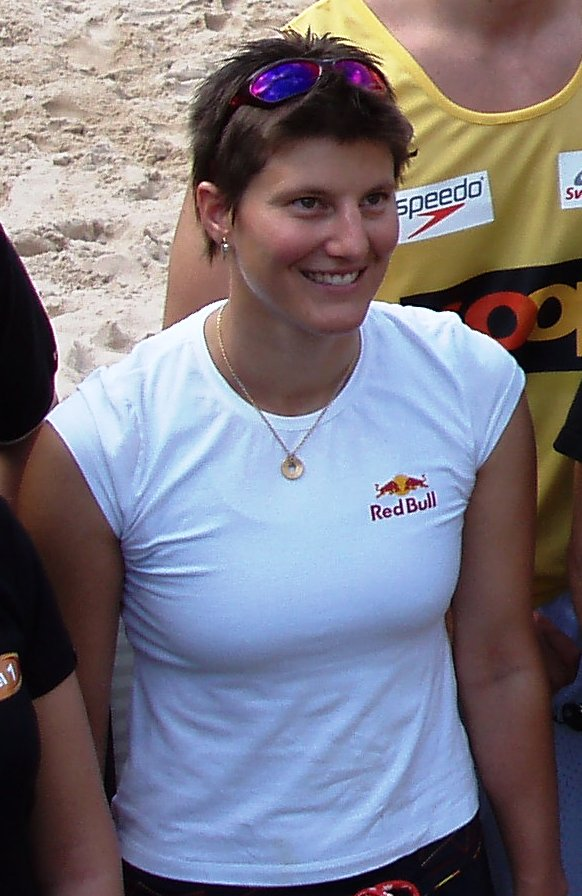

Medal record

Women's Freestyle skiing (Aerials)

Representing Switzerland

Olympic Games
Gold medal – first place	2006 Turin	Aerials

FIS Freestyle World Ski Championships
Silver medal – second place	2005 Ruka	Aerials

Evelyne Leu (born 7 July 1976) is a former Swiss freestyle skier.

She won a gold medal in Aerial skiing at the 2006 Winter Olympics. However, she failed to reach the Finals at the 2010 Winter Olympics when she crashed in her second jump during qualifying.

She retired in April 2010.
