= Les Contamines-Montjoie =

Commune in south-eastern France

Les Contamines-Montjoie Lé Kontamnè-Monzhoué (Savoyard)
- Commune
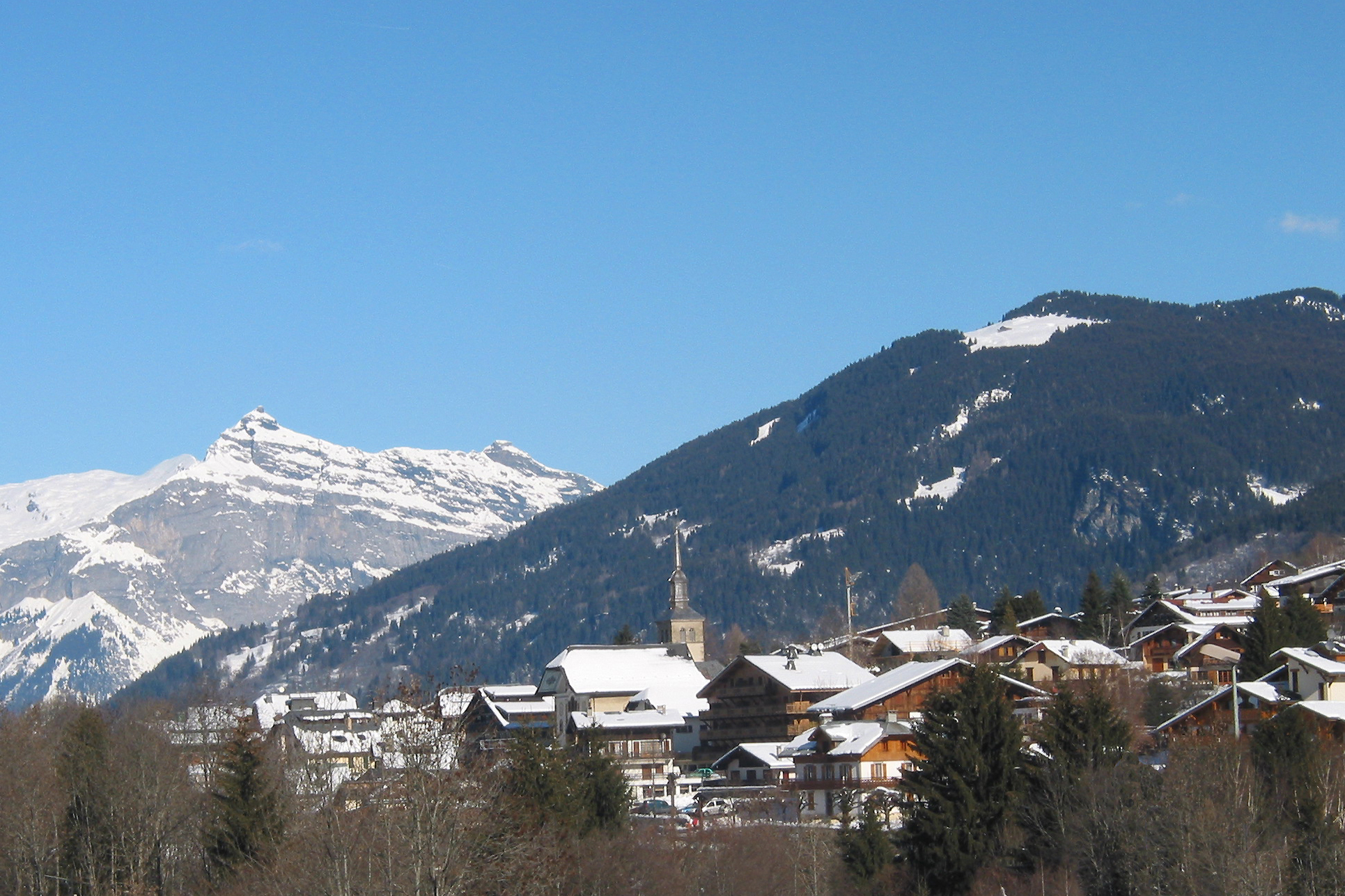
- February 2005 view of Les Contamines-Montjoie

- Coat of arms
- Location of Les Contamines-Montjoie
- Location within France Location within Auvergne-Rhône-Alpes
- Coordinates: 45°49′21″N 6°43′48″E
- Country: France
- Region: Auvergne-Rhône-Alpes
- Department: Haute-Savoie
- Arrondissement: Bonneville
- Canton: Le Mont-Blanc

Government
  - Mayor (2020–2026): François Barbier
- Area^{1}: 43.55 km^{2} (16.81 sq mi)
- Elevation: 1,164 m (3,819 ft)
- Highest elevation: 3,880 m (12,730 ft)
- Lowest elevation: 990 m (3,250 ft)
- Population (2023): 1,109
  - Density: 25.46/km^{2} (65.95/sq mi)
- Time zone: UTC+01:00 (CET)
  - Summer (DST): UTC+02:00 (CEST)
- INSEE/Postal code: 74085 /74170
- ^{1} French Land Register data, which excludes lakes, ponds, glaciers > 1 km^{2} (0.386 sq mi or 247 acres) and river estuaries.

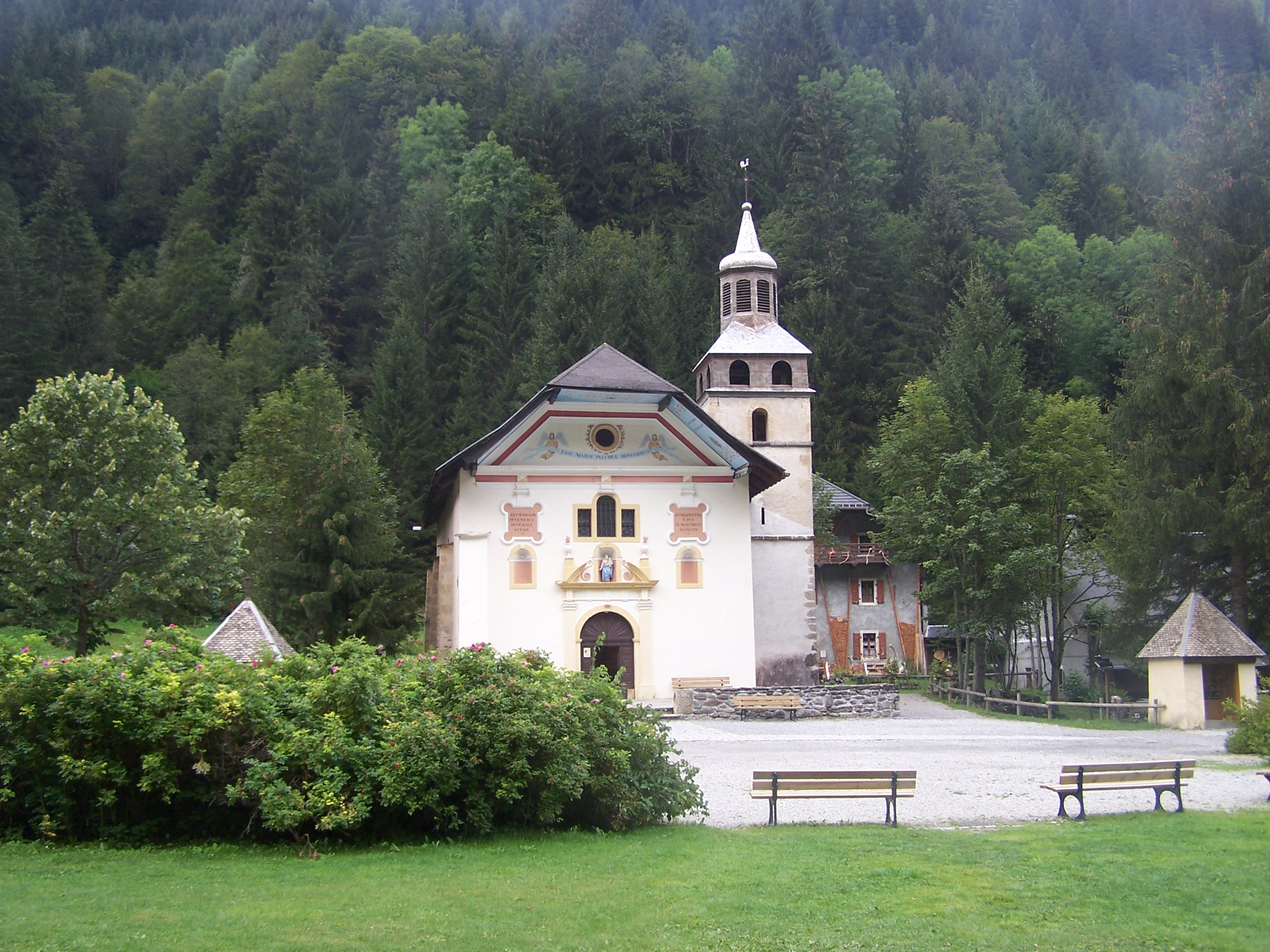
Notre-Dame-de-la-Gorge Church near Les Contamines-Montjoie

Les Contamines-Montjoie (French pronunciation: [le kɔ̃tamin mɔ̃ʒwa]; Savoyard: Lé Kontamnè-Monzhoué) is a commune in the Haute-Savoie department in the Auvergne-Rhône-Alpes region in south-eastern France.

== Etymology ==
The original name of the village, Les Contamines, is from the word contamines, which in the ancient local dialect meant ploughable land on the estate of the squire.

== History ==
In 1760, the parish became independent of the parish of Saint-Nicolas de Véroce.

The creation of the local Mountain Guides Company which was established in 1850, marked the first corporation in the village dedicated to tourism. Further development surged after 1900, in the form of hotels, restaurants, and, in 1911, a local ski club. The first ski lift began operation in 1937.

After World War II, in 1949, the name was changed to Les Contamines-Montjoie. The first chair lift opened three years later, in 1952, along with a summer attraction at l'Etape.

== Location ==
Les Contamines-Montjoie is located in the French Alps. It is approximately 1 1/4 hours from the airport of Geneva and 15 minutes from the Saint-Gervais-les-Bains-Le Fayet train station and from the A40 Highway (exit 21). Les Contamines-Montjoie is situated in between the well known resorts of Chamonix and Megève, it is close to Mont Blanc which means that it is used for both mountain climbing in the Summer and skiing in the Winter. Its proximity to Chamonix means that access to Italy is easy via the Mont Blanc Tunnel.

== Aspect of the village ==
The village of Les Contamines-Montjoie is in the Mont Blanc region. The sensation of a hidden valley results in a very close knit local community. The village has preserved its historic aspect. More than 70% of old farm buildings have been restored in respect of the local Savoy architecture.

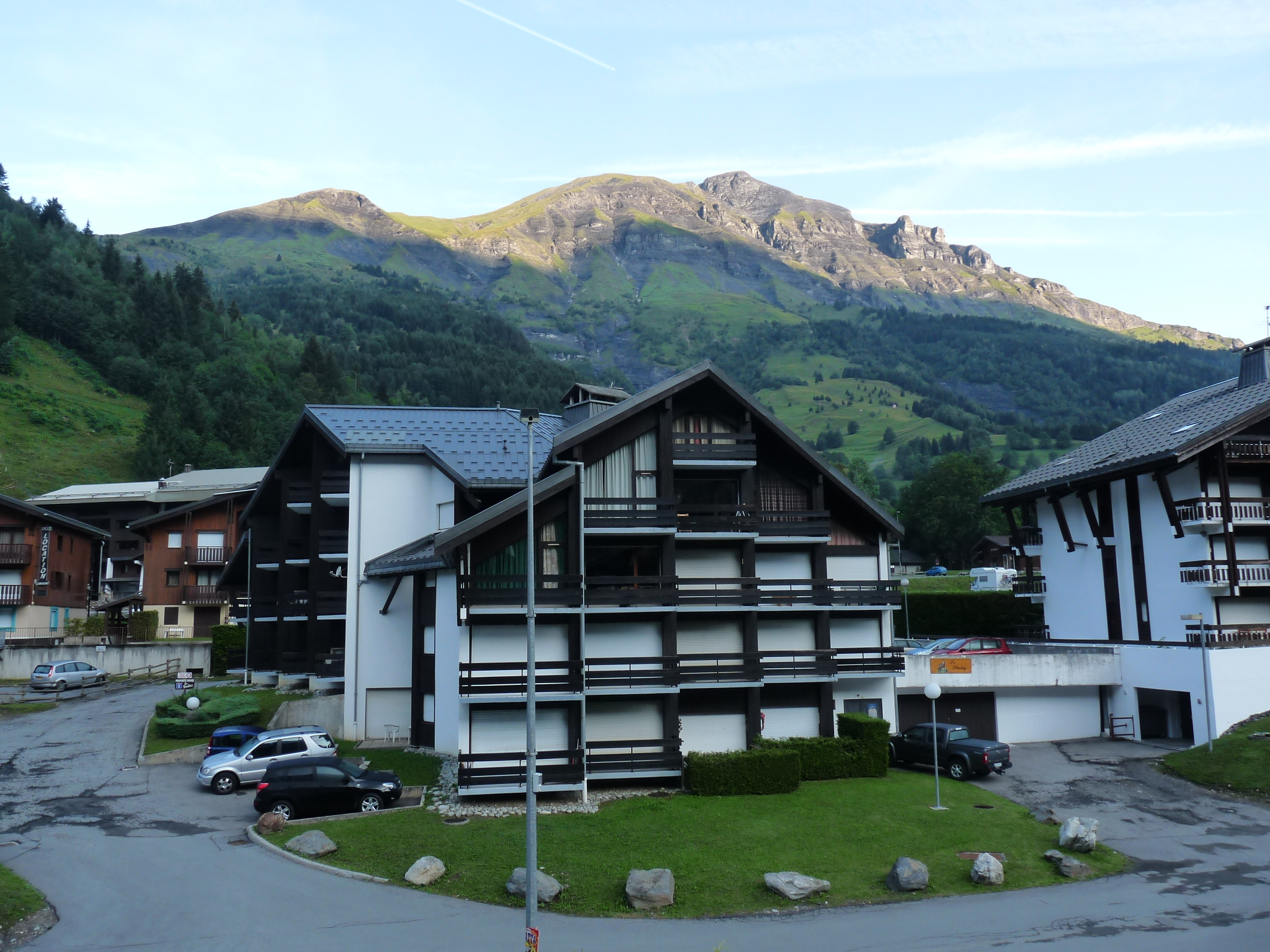
The peak of Mont Joly from the village. It is a typical demonstration of the surrounding terrain

== Nature reserve ==
Created in 1979, the nature reserve, La réserve naturelle des Contamines-Montjoie, covers more than 5,500 hectares (14,000 acres) of varied terrain rising from 1,100 to 3,800 meters (3,600 to 12,500 ft) high and covering forests, pastures, torrents, rocks, snow fields and glaciers. A local association ensures a link between the reserve and the general public. The information centre, located in the village centre, can recommend various activities for all age groups.

== Ski resort ==
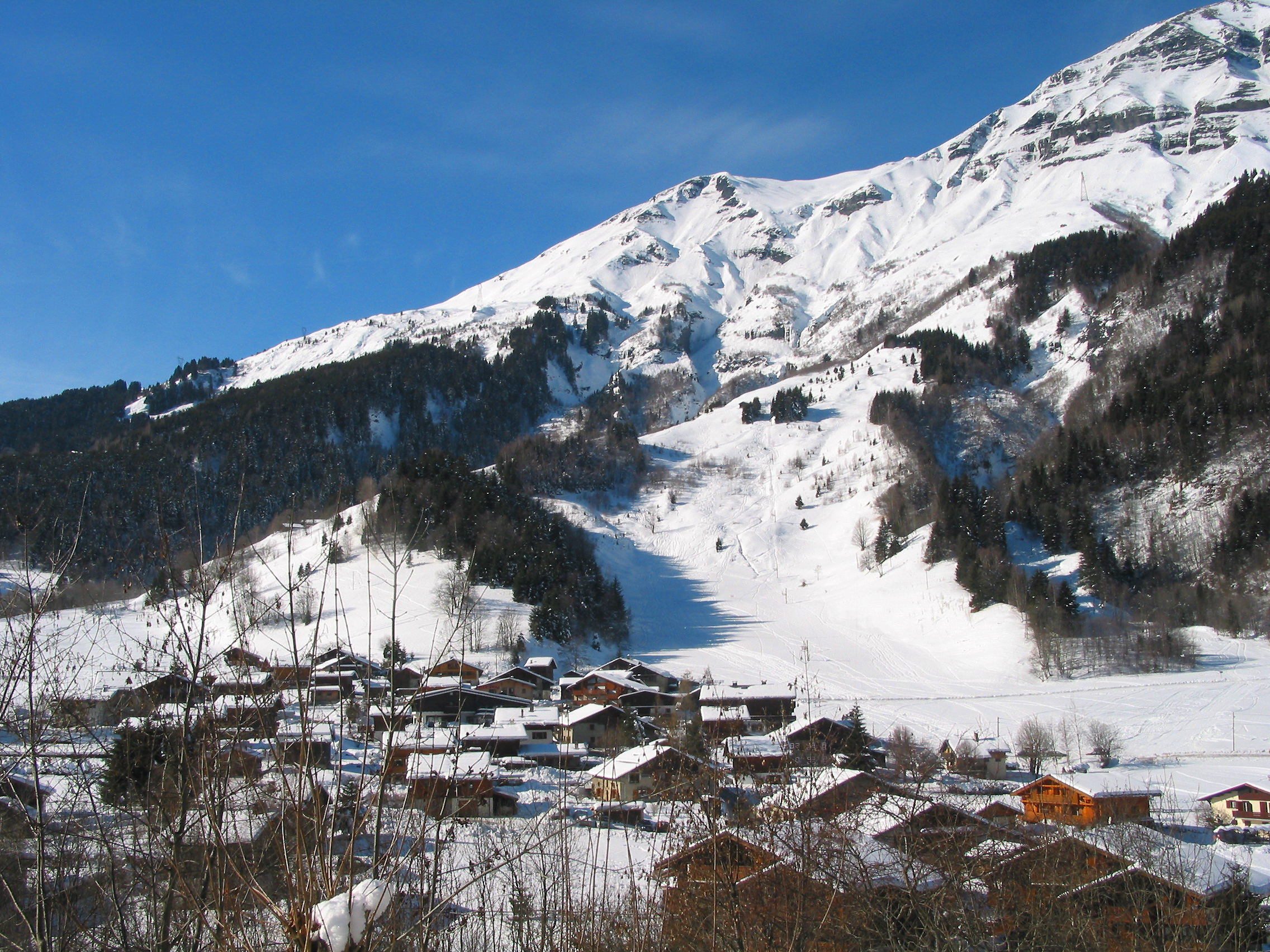
Mont Joly

Les Contamines Montjoie main industry is tourism through its skiing area which is moderately sized. It ranges from the village at around 1,100 m (3,600 ft) to l'Aiguille Croche (Crooked Needle) at around 2,500 m (8,200 ft). There are four sections of the ski area: the Tierces, the Roselette, the Montjoie, and the Hauteluce.

The Tierces section faces south: it is the highest section of the resort and possesses the resort's hardest black runs, Grevettaz and Rebans. The Tierces section also has easier blue and red runs such as Coins (blue) and Tierces (red). From most places in the Tierces section one can, weather permitting, see a panorama of Mont Blanc and its neighbouring peaks, including Aiguille de Bionnassay and Domes de Miage.

The Roselette section is a north-facing area of ski runs which range from blue to black, the hardest run in this section being the black of Olympique. The Aiguille de Roselette towers over the majority of the section giving it its name. There is off piste potential in the steep couloirs of the Aiguille de Roselette.

The Hauteluce section is the name given to the section of runs on the other side of the Col du Joly in the Val Joly (rather than the Val Montjoie). The run difficulty is varied in this section.

The Montjoie section is the name used to describe the lower runs.

== See also ==
- Communes of the Haute-Savoie department
