= 2009–10 FIS Freestyle Skiing World Cup =

Freestyle skiing competitive season

Freestyle Skiing World Cup 2009/10
Discipline	Men	Women
Overall	(Belarus) Anton Kushnir	(China) Nina Li
Moguls	(Australia) Dale Begg-Smith	(Canada) Jennifer Heil
Aerials	(Belarus) Anton Kushnir	(China) Nina Li
Ski Cross	(Switzerland) Michael Schmid	(France) Ophélie David
- Nations Cup: Canada

Competition
Locations	17	17
Individual	27	28
Cancelled	4	3

The 2009/10 FIS Freestyle Skiing World Cup was the thirty first World Cup season in freestyle skiing organised by International Ski Federation. The season started on 12 December 2009 and lasted until 18 March 2010. This season included three disciplines: moguls, aerials and ski cross. There were no halfpipe and dual moguls events this season on calendar.

== Men ==
=== Moguls ===
Num	Season	Date	Place	Event	Winner	Second	Third
271	1	11 December 2009 (Note: Moguls event for men cancelled in Meribel on 16 December 2009 was replaced in Suomu on 11 December 2009.)	(Finland) Suomu	MO	(Sweden) Jesper Björnlund	(United States) Bryon Wilson	(Canada) Alexandre Bilodeau
272	2	12 December 2009	(Finland) Suomu	MO	(Sweden) Jesper Björnlund	(United States) Bryon Wilson	(United States) Nathan Roberts
		16 December 2009	(France) Méribel	MO	replaced in Suomu		
273	3	8 January 2010	(Canada) Calgary	MO	(Australia) Dale Begg-Smith	(Canada) Vincent Marquis	(Russia) Alexandr Smyshlyaev
274	4	9 January 2010	(Canada) Calgary	MO	(Australia) Dale Begg-Smith	(Canada) Alexandre Bilodeau	(Russia) Alexandr Smyshlyaev
275	5	14 January 2010	(United States) Deer Valley	MO	(Australia) Dale Begg-Smith	(France) Guilbaut Colas	(Kazakhstan) Dmitriy Reiherd
276	6	16 January 2010	(United States) Deer Valley	MO	(France) Guilbaut Colas	(Australia) Dale Begg-Smith	(Canada) Alexandre Bilodeau
277	7	21 January 2010	(United States) Lake Placid	MO	(France) Guilbaut Colas	(Australia) Dale Begg-Smith	(Sweden) Jesper Björnlund
		6 March 2010	(Japan) Inawashiro	MO	heavy fog		
		7 March 2010	(Japan) Inawashiro	MO	heavy fog		
278	8	12 March 2010	(Sweden) Åre	MO	(Sweden) Jesper Björnlund	(United States) Patrick Deneen	(Canada) Maxime Gingras
279	9	13 March 2010	(Sweden) Åre	MO	(France) Guilbaut Colas	(Canada) Maxime Gingras	(United States) Patrick Deneen
280	10	18 March 2010	(Spain) Sierra Nevada	MO	(France) Guilbaut Colas	(Australia) Dale Begg-Smith	(France) Pierre Ochs

=== Ski Cross ===
Num	Season	Date	Place	Event	Winner	Second	Third
43	1	21 December 2009	(Italy) Innichen/San Candido	SX	(Switzerland) Michael Schmid	(France) Xavier Kuhn	(United States) Casey Puckett
44	2	22 December 2009	(Italy) Innichen/San Candido	SX	(Switzerland) Michael Schmid	(Norway) Audun Grønvold	(Switzerland) Conradign Netzer
45	3	5 January 2010	(Austria) St. Johann in Tirol	SX	(Germany) Simon Stickl	(United States) Daron Rahlves	(Canada) David Duncan
46	4	9 January 2010	(France) Les Contamines	SX	(France) Xavier Kuhn	(Canada) Stanley Hayer	(Czech Republic) Tomáš Kraus
47	5	13 January 2010	(France) Alpe d'Huez	SX	(Canada) Christopher Del Bosco	(Czech Republic) Tomáš Kraus	(France) Ted Piccard
48	6	20 January 2010	(Canada) Blue Mountain	SX	(Austria) Andreas Matt	(Sweden) Lars Lewen	(Austria) Patrick Koller
49	7	24 January 2010	(United States) Lake Placid	SX	(Canada) Christopher Del Bosco	(Austria) Andreas Matt	(Canada) David Duncan
		3 March 2010	(Norway) Norefjell	SX	cancelled		
50	8	6 March 2010	(Sweden) Branäs	SX	(Switzerland) Michael Schmid	(Canada) Christopher Del Bosco	(Austria) Andreas Matt
51	9	12 March 2010 (Note: Ski cross event for men in Grindelwald replaces the 11 March 2010 date on the same place.)	(Switzerland) Grindelwald	SX	(Norway) Audun Grønvold	(Switzerland) Michael Schmid	(Canada) Christopher Del Bosco
52	10	14 March 2010	(Switzerland) Meiringen-Hasliberg	SX	(Switzerland) Michael Schmid	(Norway) Audun Grønvold	(Canada) Christopher Del Bosco
53	11	20 March 2010	(Spain) Sierra Nevada	SX	(Switzerland) Michael Schmid	(Norway) Audun Grønvold	(Switzerland) Andreas Steffen

=== Aerials ===
Num	Season	Date	Place	Event	Winner	Second	Third
270	1	19 December 2009	(China) Changchun	AE	(Belarus) Anton Kushnir	(China) Zhongqing Liu	(China) Chao Wu
271	2	20 December 2009	(China) Changchun	AE	(China) Zongyang Jia	(China) Guangpu Qi	(Belarus) Anton Kushnir
272	3	10 January 2010	(Canada) Calgary	AE	(China) Zongyang Jia	(Belarus) Anton Kushnir	(Belarus) Alexei Grishin
273	4	15 January 2010	(United States) Deer Valley	AE	(Belarus) Anton Kushnir	(China) Guangpu Qi	(Belarus) Dmitri Dashinski
274	5	22 January 2010	(United States) Lake Placid	AE	(Belarus) Anton Kushnir	(Canada) Warren Shouldice	(Canada) Ryan Blais
275	6	30 January 2010	(Canada) Mont Gabriel	AE	(Belarus) Anton Kushnir	(China) Guangpu Qi	(Switzerland) Renato Ulrich

== Women ==
=== Moguls ===
Num	Season	Date	Place	Event	Winner	Second	Third
271	1	11 December 2009 (Note: Moguls event for ladies cancelled in Meribel on 16 December 2009 was replaced in Suomu on 11 December 2009.)	(Finland) Suomu	MO	(Canada) Kristi Richards	(Japan) Aiko Uemura	(United States) Hannah Kearney
272	2	12 December 2009	(Finland) Suomu	MO	(United States) Hannah Kearney	(Canada) Kristi Richards	(Canada) Jennifer Heil
		16 December 2009	(France) Méribel	MO	cancelled		
273	3	8 January 2010	(Canada) Calgary	MO	(Canada) Jennifer Heil	(Czech Republic) Nikola Sudová	(Austria) Margarita Marbler
274	4	9 January 2010	(Canada) Calgary	MO	(Canada) Jennifer Heil	(Japan) Aiko Uemura	(Czech Republic) Nikola Sudová
275	5	14 January 2010	(United States) Deer Valley	MO	(United States) Heather McPhie (Canada) Jennifer Heil		(United States) Shannon Bahrke
276	6	16 January 2010	(United States) Deer Valley	MO	(Canada) Jennifer Heil	(United States) Heather McPhie	(United States) Michelle Roark
277	7	21 January 2010	(United States) Lake Placid	MO	(United States) Hannah Kearney	(United States) Shannon Bahrke	(United States) Heather McPhie
		6 March 2010	(Japan) Inawashiro	MO	cancelled		
278	8	7 March 2010	(Japan) Inawashiro	MO	(Japan) Aiko Uemura	(Canada) Jennifer Heil	(United States) Shannon Bahrke
279	9	12 March 2010	(Sweden) Åre	MO	(United States) Hannah Kearney	(Canada) Jennifer Heil	(United States) Shannon Bahrke
280	10	13 March 2010	(Sweden) Åre	MO	(United States) Hannah Kearney	(United States) Shannon Bahrke	(Canada) Jennifer Heil
281	11	18 March 2010	(Spain) Sierra Nevada	MO	(United States) Eliza Outtrim	(Austria) Margarita Marbler	(United States) Heather McPhie

=== Ski Cross ===
Num	Season	Date	Place	Event	Winner	Second	Third
44	1	21 December 2009	(Italy) Innichen/San Candido	SX	(Sweden) Anna Holmlund	(Canada) Ashleigh McIvor	(France) Ophélie David
45	2	22 December 2009	(Italy) Innichen/San Candido	SX	(Sweden) Anna Holmlund	(France) Ophélie David	(Switzerland) Sanna Lüdi
46	3	5 January 2010	(Austria) St. Johann in Tirol	SX	(France) Ophélie David	(France) Méryll Boulangeat	(Canada) Julia Murray
47	4	9 January 2010	(France) Les Contamines	SX	(Canada) Ashleigh McIvor	(Canada) Julia Murray	(Austria) Karin Huttary
48	5	13 January 2010	(France) Alpe d'Huez	SX	(Canada) Kelsey Serwa	(France) Ophélie David	(Canada) Ashleigh McIvor
49	6	20 January 2010	(Canada) Blue Mountain	SX	(Norway) Marte Hoeie Gjefsen	(Canada) Ashleigh McIvor	(Slovenia) Saša Farič
50	7	24 January 2010	(United States) Lake Placid	SX	(Canada) Kelsey Serwa	(Switzerland) Fanny Smith	(France) Ophélie David
		3 March 2010	(Norway) Norefjell	SX	cancelled		
51	8	6 March 2010	(Sweden) Branäs	SX	(France) Ophélie David	(Canada) Aleisha Cline	(Switzerland) Fanny Smith
52	9	12 March 2010	(Switzerland) Grindelwald (Note: Ski cross event for ladies in Grindelwald replaces the 11 March 2010 date on the same place.)	SX	(Canada) Kelsey Serwa	(Canada) Ashleigh McIvor	(Canada) Danielle Poleschuk
53	10	14 March 2010	(Switzerland) Meiringen-Hasliberg	SX	(Sweden) Anna Holmlund	(France) Ophélie David	(Norway) Marte Høie Gjefsen
54	11	20 March 2010	(Spain) Sierra Nevada	SX	(Sweden) Anna Holmlund	(France) Ophélie David	(Norway) Marte Høie Gjefsen

=== Aerials ===
Num	Season	Date	Place	Event	Winner	Second	Third
273	1	19 December 2009	(China) Changchun	AE	(China) Xinxin Guo	(China) Nina Li	(China) Mengtao Xu
274	2	20 December 2009	(China) Changchun	AE	(China) Mengtao Xu	(China) Xinxin Guo	(China) Xin Zhang
275	3	10 January 2010	(Canada) Calgary	AE	(China) Nina Li	(Switzerland) Evelyne Leu	(China) Xinxin Guo
276	4	15 January 2010	(United States) Deer Valley	AE	(Australia) Lydia Lassila	(China) Mengtao Xu	(China) Nina Li
277	5	22 January 2010	(United States) Lake Placid	AE	(Australia) Lydia Lassila	(China) Nina Li	(China) Xin Zhang
278	6	30 January 2010	(Canada) Mont Gabriel	AE	(China) Nina Li	(China) Shuang Cheng	(Belarus) Assoli Slivets

== Men's standings ==
=== Overall ===
Rank		Points
1	(Belarus) Anton Kushnir	90.00
2	(Switzerland) Michael Schmid	74.09
3	(Australia) Dale Begg-Smith	69.30
4	(France) Guilbaut Colas	61.50
5	(Sweden) Jesper Bjoernlund	55.20

- Standings after 27 races.

=== Moguls ===
Rank		Points
1	(Australia) Dale Begg-Smith	693
2	(France) Guilbaut Colas	615
3	(Sweden) Jesper Bjoernlund	552
4	(Canada) Alexandre Bilodeau	347
5	(United States) Bryon Wilson	306

- Standings after 10 races.

=== Aerials ===
Rank		Points
1	(Belarus) Anton Kushnir	540
2	(China) Qi Guangpu	265
3	(China) Zongyang Jia	246
4	(Switzerland) Renato Ulrich	215
5	(Belarus) Timofei Slivets	192

- Standings after 6 races.

=== Ski Cross ===
Rank		Points
1	(Switzerland) Michael Schmid	815
2	(Canada) Christopher Del Bosco	547
3	(Norway) Audun Grønvold	530
4	(Austria) Andreas Matt	432
5	(Canada) Stanley Hayer	352

- Standings after 11 races.

== Women's standings ==
=== Overall ===
Rank		Points
1	(China) Nina Li	72.67
2	(France) Ophélie David	66.82
3	(Canada) Jennifer Heil	65.91
4	(China) Guo Xinxin	57.67
5	(United States) Heather McPhie	56.00

- Standings after 28 races.

=== Moguls ===
Rank		Points
1	(Canada) Jennifer Heil	725
2	(United States) Heather McPhie	616
3	(United States) Hannah Kearney	616
4	(United States) Shannon Bahrke	507
5	(Austria) Margarita Marbler	410

- Standings after 11 races.

=== Aerials ===
Rank		Points
1	(China) Nina Li	436
2	(China) Xinxin Guo	346
3	(China) Mengtao Xu	314
4	(Australia) Lydia Lassila	259
5	(China) Xin Zhang	254

- Standings after 6 races.

=== Ski Cross ===
Rank		Points
1	(France) Ophélie David	735
2	(Canada) Ashleigh McIvor	608
3	(Sweden) Anna Holmlund	522
4	(Canada) Kelsey Serwa	487
5	(Norway) Marte Høie Gjefsen	381

- Standings after 11 races.

== Nations Cup ==
=== Overall ===
Rank		Points
1	Canada	845
2	United States	591
3	China	452
4	Switzerland	395
5	France	297

- Standings after 55 races.

=== Men ===
Rank		Points
1	Canada	418
2	United States	243
3	Switzerland	239
4	France	197
5	China	165

- Standings after 27 races.

=== Women ===
Rank		Points
1	Canada	427
2	United States	348
3	China	287
4	Switzerland	156
5	Australia	112

- Standings after 28 races.
