= Freestyle skiing at the 2010 Winter Olympics – Men's ski cross =

Ski Cross Men at the XXI Olympic Winter Games
- Venue: Cypress Bowl Ski Area in Cypress Provincial Park, West Vancouver, British Columbia, Canada
- Dates: 21 February
- Competitors: 33 from 15 nations

Medalists
1st place, gold medalist(s)		Michael Schmid	Switzerland
2nd place, silver medalist(s)		Andreas Matt	Austria
3rd place, bronze medalist(s)		Audun Grønvold	Norway

The men's ski cross event in freestyle skiing at the 2010 Winter Olympics in Vancouver, British Columbia, Canada, took place on 21 February at the Cypress Bowl Ski Area in the Cypress Provincial Park, West Vancouver.

== Results ==
=== Qualification ===
The qualification was held at 09:15.

Rank	Bib	Name	Country	Time	Notes
1	4	Michael Schmid	Switzerland	1:12.53	Q
2	6	Christopher Del Bosco	Canada	1:12.89	Q
3	13	Xavier Kuhn	France	1:12.91	Q
4	5	Andreas Matt	Austria	1:13.13	Q
5	14	Audun Grønvold	Norway	1:13.23	Q
6	2	Thomas Zangerl	Austria	1:13.44	Q
7	31	Filip Flisar	Slovenia	1:13.46	Q
8	1	Simon Stickl	Germany	1:13.49	Q
9	27	Errol Kerr	Jamaica	1:13.71	Q
10	11	Stanley Hayer	Canada	1:13.74	Q
11	7	Tomáš Kraus	Czech Republic	1:13.75	Q
12	33	Scott Kneller	Australia	1:13.85	Q
13	20	Enak Gavaggio	France	1:13.90	Q
14	17	Sylvain Miaillier	France	1:13.91	Q
14	16	Conradign Netzer	Switzerland	1:13.91	Q
16	8	Ted Piccard	France	1:14.10	Q
17	29	Anders Rekdal	Norway	1:14.17	Q
18	12	Casey Puckett	United States	1:14.35	Q
19	9	Lars Lewen	Sweden	1:14.44	Q
20	25	Egor Korotkov	Russia	1:14.54	Q
21	32	Michael Forslund	Sweden	1:14.66	Q
21	23	Juha Haukkala	Finland	1:14.66	Q
23	22	Tommy Eliasson	Sweden	1:14.73	Q
24	15	Daron Rahlves	United States	1:14.91	Q
25	10	Davey Barr	Canada	1:14.98	Q
26	21	Hiroomi Takizawa	Japan	1:15.03	Q
27	19	Richard Spalinger	Switzerland	1:15.12	Q
28	18	Patrick Koller	Austria	1:15.22	Q
29	24	Martin Fiala	Germany	1:15.88	Q
30	26	Markus Wittner	Austria	1:15.91	Q
31	3	Beni Hofer	Switzerland	1:16.18	Q
32	30	Eric Iljans	Sweden	1:16.34	Q
	28	Zdeněk Šafář	Czech Republic	DNF	

=== Elimination round ===
The top two finishers from each heat advance to the next round. In the semifinals the first two ranked competitors of each heat proceed to the Big Final, third and fourth ranked competitors of each heat proceed to the Small Final.

==== 1/8 round ====
Heat 1

Rank	Bib	Name	Country	Notes
1	1	Michael Schmid	Switzerland	Q
2	32	Eric Iljans	Sweden	Q
3	24	Daron Rahlves	United States	
4	16	Ted Piccard	France	DNF

Heat 2

Rank	Bib	Name	Country	Notes
1	9	Errol Kerr	Jamaica	Q
2	25	Davey Barr	Canada	Q
3	8	Simon Stickl	Germany	
4	17	Anders Rekdal	Norway	DNF

Heat 3

Rank	Bib	Name	Country	Notes
1	11	Tomáš Kraus	Czech Republic	Q
2	27	Richard Spalinger	Switzerland	Q
3	6	Thomas Zangerl	Austria	
4	19	Lars Lewen	Sweden	

Heat 4

Rank	Bib	Name	Country	Notes
1	13	Enak Gavaggio	France	Q
2	4	Andreas Matt	Austria	Q
3	29	Martin Fiala	Germany	
4	21	Michael Forslund	Sweden	

Heat 5

Rank	Bib	Name	Country	Notes
1	14	Sylvain Miaillier	France	Q
2	30	Markus Wittner	Austria	Q
3	22	Juha Haukkala	Finland	
4	3	Xavier Kuhn	France	DNF

Heat 6

Rank	Bib	Name	Country	Notes
1	5	Audun Grønvold	Norway	Q
2	12	Scott Kneller	Australia	Q
3	20	Egor Korotkov	Russia	
4	28	Patrick Koller	Austria	

Heat 7

Rank	Bib	Name	Country	Notes
1	7	Filip Flisar	Slovenia	Q
2	10	Stanley Hayer	Canada	Q
3	26	Hiroomi Takizawa	Japan	
4	18	Casey Puckett	United States	

Heat 8

Rank	Bib	Name	Country	Notes
1	2	Christopher Del Bosco	Canada	Q
2	23	Tommy Eliasson	Sweden	Q
3	15	Conradign Netzer	Switzerland	
4	31	Beni Hofer	Switzerland	

==== Quarterfinals ====
Heat 1

Rank	Bib	Name	Country	Notes
1	1	Michael Schmid	Switzerland	Q
2	25	Davey Barr	Canada	Q
3	9	Errol Kerr	Jamaica	
4	32	Eric Iljans	Sweden	

Heat 2

Rank	Bib	Name	Country	Notes
1	13	Enak Gavaggio	France	Q
2	4	Andreas Matt	Austria	Q
3	11	Tomáš Kraus	Czech Republic	
4	27	Richard Spalinger	Switzerland	

Heat 3

Rank	Bib	Name	Country	Notes
1	5	Audun Grønvold	Norway	Q
2	12	Scott Kneller	Australia	Q
3	14	Sylvain Miaillier	France	
4	30	Markus Wittner	Austria	

Heat 4

Rank	Bib	Name	Country	Notes
1	2	Christopher Del Bosco	Canada	Q
2	7	Filip Flisar	Slovenia	Q
3	23	Tommy Eliasson	Sweden	
4	10	Stanley Hayer	Canada	

==== Semifinals ====
Heat 1

Rank	Bib	Name	Country	Notes
1	1	Michael Schmid	Switzerland	Q
2	4	Andreas Matt	Austria	Q
3	25	Davey Barr	Canada	
4	13	Enak Gavaggio	France	

Heat 2

Rank	Bib	Name	Country	Notes
1	5	Audun Grønvold	Norway	Q
2	2	Christopher Del Bosco	Canada	Q
3	12	Scott Kneller	Australia	
4	7	Filip Flisar	Slovenia	

==== Finals ====
Small Final

Rank	Bib	Name	Country	Notes
5	13	Enak Gavaggio	France	
6	25	Davey Barr	Canada	
7	12	Scott Kneller	Australia	
8	7	Filip Flisar	Slovenia	DNF

Big Final

Rank	Bib	Name	Country	Notes
1st place, gold medalist(s)	1	Michael Schmid	Switzerland	
2nd place, silver medalist(s)	4	Andreas Matt	Austria	
3rd place, bronze medalist(s)	5	Audun Grønvold	Norway	
4	2	Christopher Del Bosco	Canada	DNF
