= 2007–08 FIS Freestyle Skiing World Cup =

Freestyle skiing competitive season

Freestyle Skiing World Cup 2007/08
Discipline	Men	Women
Overall	(Canada) Steve Omischl	(France) Ophélie David
Moguls	(Australia) Dale Begg-Smith	(Japan) Aiko Uemura
Aerials	(Canada) Steve Omischl	(Australia) Jacqui Cooper
Ski Cross	(Czech Republic) Tomáš Kraus	(France) Ophélie David
Halfpipe	(Canada) Matthew Hayward	(Canada) Sarah Burke
- Nations Cup: Canada

Competition
Locations	18	18
Individual	30	30
Cancelled	2	2

The 2007/08 FIS Freestyle Skiing World Cup was the twenty ninth World Cup season in freestyle skiing organised by International Ski Federation. The season started on 12 December 2007 and ended on 16 March 2008. This season included four disciplines: aerials, moguls, ski cross and halfpipe.

Dual mogul counted together with moguls ranking and for moguls title.

== Men ==
=== Moguls ===
Num	Season	Date	Place	Event	Winner	Second	Third
34	1	8 March 2008	(Sweden) Åre	DM	(Kazakhstan) Dmitriy Reiherd	(Australia) Dale Begg-Smith	(Canada) Vincent Marquis
255	1	13 December 2007	(France) Tignes	MO	(Canada) Pierre-Alexandre Rousseau	(Finland) Tapio Luusua	(Canada) Alexandre Bilodeau
256	2	18 January 2008	(United States) Lake Placid	MO	(Canada) Warren Tanner	(Australia) Dale Begg-Smith	(United States) Patrick Deneen
257	3	20 January 2008	(United States) Lake Placid	MO	(Australia) Dale Begg-Smith	(Canada) Alexandre Bilodeau	(United States) Patrick Deneen
258	4	26 January 2008	(Canada) Mont Gabriel	MO	(France) Guilbaut Colas	(Russia) Ruslan Sharifullin	(Canada) Vincent Marquis
259	5	2 February 2008	(United States) Deer Valley	MO	(Canada) Vincent Marquis	(United States) Landon Gardner	(Canada) Alexandre Bilodeau
		9 February 2008	(Canada) Cypress Mountain	MO	cancelled		
260	6	16 February 2008	(Japan) Inawashiro	MO	(Australia) Dale Begg-Smith	(Japan) Osamu Ueno	(United States) David Babic (France) Guilbaut Colas
261	7	1 March 2008	(Czech Republic) Mariánské Lázně	MO	(France) Guilbaut Colas	(United States) Nathan Roberts	(Canada) Alexandre Bilodeau
262	8	7 March 2008	(Sweden) Åre	MO	(Australia) Dale Begg-Smith	(United States) Nathan Roberts	(Kazakhstan) Dmitriy Reiherd
263	9	15 March 2008	(Italy) Valmalenco	MO	(United States) David Babic	(Canada) Vincent Marquis	(United States) Patrick Deneen

=== Aerials ===
Num	Season	Date	Place	Event	Winner	Second	Third
255	1	21 December 2007	(China) Lianhua Mountain	AE	(Canada) Steve Omischl	(Belarus) Anton Kushnir	(China) Xiaopeng Han
256	2	22 December 2007	(China) Lianhua Mountain	AE	(Belarus) Dmitri Dashinski	(China) Xiaopeng Han	(Canada) Steve Omischl
257	3	19 January 2008	(United States) Lake Placid	AE	(Canada) Steve Omischl	(Belarus) Anton Kushnir	(China) Xiaopeng Han
258	4	27 January 2008	(Canada) Mont Gabriel	AE	(Canada) Steve Omischl	(Belarus) Anton Kushnir	(Belarus) Dmitri Dashinski
259	5	1 February 2008	(United States) Deer Valley	AE	(Ukraine) Stanislav Kravchuk	(Russia) Vladimir Lebedev	(Switzerland) Renato Ulrich
260	6	10 February 2008	(Canada) Cypress Mountain	AE	(Canada) Steve Omischl	(Belarus) Dmitri Dashinski	(Canada) Warren Shouldice
261	7	17 February 2008	(Japan) Inawashiro	AE	(Belarus) Anton Kushnir	(Canada) Steve Omischl	(United States) Ryan St. Onge
262	8	1 March 2008	(Russia) Moscow	AE	(Canada) Steve Omischl	(Ukraine) Stanislav Kravchuk	(France) Nicolas Thepaut
263	9	7 March 2008	(Switzerland) Davos-Parsenn	AE	(Canada) Steve Omischl	(Canada) Warren Shouldice	(Belarus) Dmitri Dashinski

=== Ski Cross ===
Num	Season	Date	Place	Event	Winner	Second	Third
26	1	12 January 2008	(France) Les Contamines	SX	(Czech Republic) Tomas Kraus	(United States) Casey Puckett	(Canada) Stanley Hayer
27	2	16 January 2008	(France) Flaine	SX	(Czech Republic) Tomas Kraus	(France) Enak Gavaggio	(Switzerland) Richard Spalinger
28	3	20 January 2008	(Austria) Kreischberg	SX	(Czech Republic) Tomas Kraus	(Switzerland) Michael Schmid	(Switzerland) Alois Mani
29	4	2 February 2008	(United States) Deer Valley	SX	(Canada) Davey Barr	(United States) Casey Puckett	(Switzerland) Michael Schmid
30	5	22 February 2008	(Spain) Sierra Nevada	SX	(Czech Republic) Tomas Kraus	(Canada) Stanley Hayer	(Switzerland) Andreas Steffen
		28 February 2008	(Czech Republic) Mariánské Lázně	SX	cancelled		
31	6	6 March 2008	(Switzerland) Grindelwald	SX	(Sweden) Lars Lewen	(Canada) Davey Barr	(Canada) Stanley Hayer
32	7	9 March 2008	(Switzerland) Meiringen-Hasliberg	SX	(Sweden) Lars Lewen	(Canada) Stanley Hayer	(Czech Republic) Tomas Kraus
33	8	16 March 2008	(Italy) Valmalenco	SX	(Sweden) Lars Lewen	(Switzerland) Andreas Steffen	(Austria) Andreas Matt

=== Halfpipe ===
Num	Season	Date	Place	Event	Winner	Second	Third
7	1	13 January 2008	(France) Les Contamines	HP	(Canada) Matthew Hayward	(France) Kevin Rolland	(Canada) Justin Dorey
8	2	15 February 2008	(Japan) Inawashiro	HP	(Canada) Matthew Hayward	(Finland) Kalle Leinonen	(Canada) Michael Riddle
9	3	12 March 2008	(Italy) Valmalenco	HP	(Canada) Michael Riddle	(Finland) Kalle Leinonen	(France) Xavier Bertoni

== Ladies ==
=== Moguls ===
Num	Season	Date	Place	Event	Winner	Second	Third
33	1	8 March 2008	(Sweden) Åre	DM	(Japan) Aiko Uemura	(Czech Republic) Nikola Sudova	(United States) Kayla Snyderman
255	1	13 December 2007	(France) Tignes	MO	(Austria) Margarita Marbler	(Japan) Aiko Uemura	(Canada) Kristi Richards
256	2	18 January 2008	(United States) Lake Placid	MO	(United States) Emiko Torito	(Italy) Deborah Scanzio	(United States) Kayla Snyderman
257	3	20 January 2008	(United States) Lake Placid	MO	(United States) Michelle Roark	(Russia) Ekaterina Stolyarova	(Czech Republic) Nikola Sudova
258	4	26 January 2008	(Canada) Mont Gabriel	MO	(Russia) Ekaterina Stolyarova	(Italy) Deborah Scanzio	(United States) Michelle Roark
259	5	2 February 2008	(United States) Deer Valley	MO	(United States) Shelly Robertson	(Austria) Margarita Marbler	(Canada) Kristi Richards
		9 February 2008	(Canada) Cypress Mountain	MO	cancelled		
260	6	16 February 2008	(Japan) Inawashiro	MO	(Japan) Aiko Uemura	(Czech Republic) Nikola Sudova	(United States) Emiko Torito
261	7	1 March 2008	(Czech Republic) Mariánské Lázně	MO	(Japan) Aiko Uemura	(Canada) Sylvia Kerfoot	(United States) Emiko Torito
262	8	7 March 2008	(Sweden) Åre	MO	(Japan) Aiko Uemura	(Canada) Kristi Richards	(United States) Emiko Torito
263	9	15 March 2008	(Italy) Valmalenco	MO	(Japan) Aiko Uemura	(Austria) Margarita Marbler	(Czech Republic) Nikola Sudova

=== Aerials ===
Num	Season	Date	Place	Event	Winner	Second	Third
257	1	21 December 2007	(China) Lianhua Mountain	AE	(Australia) Jacqui Cooper	(Australia) Lydia Lassila	(China) Xinxin Guo
258	2	22 December 2007	(China) Lianhua Mountain	AE	(Australia) Jacqui Cooper	(China) Nina Li	(China) Shuang Cheng
259	3	19 January 2008	(United States) Lake Placid	AE	(Australia) Jacqui Cooper	(China) Xinxin Guo	(Switzerland) Evelyne Leu
260	4	27 January 2008	(Canada) Mont Gabriel	AE	(Belarus) Alla Tsuper	(China) Nina Li	(Australia) Lydia Lassila
261	5	1 February 2008	(United States) Deer Valley	AE	(China) Nina Li	(Australia) Jacqui Cooper	(China) Shuang Cheng
262	6	10 February 2008	(Canada) Cypress Mountain	AE	(Australia) Jacqui Cooper	(Australia) Lydia Lassila	(China) Shuangfei Dai
263	7	17 February 2008	(Japan) Inawashiro	AE	(Australia) Jacqui Cooper	(Belarus) Alla Tsuper	(China) Nina Li
264	8	1 March 2008	(Russia) Moscow	AE	(United States) Emily Cook	(Canada) Deidra Dionne	(China) Zhang Xin
265	9	7 March 2008	(Switzerland) Davos-Parsenn	AE	(Switzerland) Evelyne Leu	(Australia) Lydia Lassila	(Belarus) Alla Tsuper

=== Ski Cross ===
Num	Season	Date	Place	Event	Winner	Second	Third
26	1	12 January 2008	(France) Les Contamines	SX	(France) Ophelie David	(Norway) Hedda Berntsen	(France) Meryll Boulangeat
27	2	16 January 2008	(France) Flaine	SX	(France) Meryll Boulangeat	(Australia) Jenny Owens	(Japan) Noriko Fukushima
28	3	20 January 2008	(Austria) Kreischberg	SX	(France) Ophelie David	(Austria) Karin Huttary	(Australia) Jenny Owens
29	4	2 February 2008	(United States) Deer Valley	SX	(France) Ophelie David	(Slovenia) Saša Farič	(Switzerland) Emilie Serain
30	5	22 February 2008	(Spain) Sierra Nevada	SX	(France) Ophelie David	(Norway) Hedda Berntsen	(Austria) Katrin Ofner
		28 February 2008	(Czech Republic) Mariánské Lázně	SX	cancelled		
31	6	6 March 2008	(Switzerland) Grindelwald	SX	(Slovenia) Saša Farič	(Switzerland) Emilie Serain	(France) Meryll Boulangeat
32	7	9 March 2008	(Switzerland) Meiringen-Hasliberg	SX	(France) Ophelie David	(Slovenia) Saša Farič	(Norway) Gro Kvinlog
33	8	16 March 2008	(Italy) Valmalenco	SX	(France) Ophelie David	(Norway) Hedda Berntsen	(France) Meryll Boulangeat

=== Halfpipe ===
Num	Season	Date	Place	Event	Winner	Second	Third
7	1	13 January 2008	(France) Les Contamines	HP	(Canada) Sarah Burke	(United States) Jen Hudak	(Switzerland) Mirjam Jaeger
8	2	15 February 2008	(Japan) Inawashiro	HP	(Canada) Sarah Burke	(United States) Jen Hudak	(Australia) Davina Williams
9	3	12 March 2008	(Italy) Valmalenco	HP	(United States) Jen Hudak	(Canada) Sarah Burke	(Canada) Rosalind Groenewoud

== Men's standings ==
=== Overall ===
Rank		Points
1	(Canada) Steve Omischl	85.44
2	(Czech Republic) Tomas Kraus	69.37
3	(Australia) Dale Begg-Smith	66.40
4	(Belarus) Anton Kushnir	60.33
5	(Sweden) Lars Lewen	56.00

- Standings after 30 races.

=== Moguls ===
Rank		Points
1	(Australia) Dale Begg-Smith	664
2	(France) Guilbaut Colas	499
3	(Canada) Vincent Marquis	429
4	(Canada) Alexandre Bilodeau	402
5	(United States) Patrick Deneen	352

- Standings after 10 races.

=== Aerials ===
Rank		Points
1	(Canada) Steve Omischl	769
2	(Belarus) Anton Kushnir	543
3	(Belarus) Dmitri Dashinski	444
4	(Ukraine) Stanislav Kravchuk	396
5	(China) HanXiaopeng	352

- Standings after 9 races.

=== Ski Cross ===
Rank		Points
1	(Czech Republic) Tomas Kraus	555
2	(Sweden) Lars Lewen	448
3	(Canada) Stanley Hayer	344
4	(Canada) Davey Barr	302
5	(France) Ted Piccard	263

- Standings after 8 races.

=== Halfpipe ===
Rank		Points
1	(Canada) Matthew Hayward	229
2	(Finland) Kalle Leinonen	196
3	(Canada) Michael Riddle	170
4	(Canada) Justin Dorey	160
5	(France) Xavier Bertoni	137

- Standings after 3 races.

== Ladies' standings ==
=== Overall ===
Rank		Points
1	(France) Ophelie David	80.75
2	(Australia) Jacqui Cooper	71.33
3	(Japan) Aiko Uemura	68.30
4	(Canada) Sarah Burke	56.00
5	(Slovenia) Saša Farič	55.88

- Standings after 30 races.

=== Moguls ===
Rank		Points
1	(Japan) Aiko Uemura	683
2	(Czech Republic) Nikola Sudova	540
3	(Austria) Margarita Marbler	510
4	(Canada) Kristi Richards	405
5	(United States) Emiko Torito	396

- Standings after 10 races.

=== Aerials ===
Rank		Points
1	(Australia) Jacqui Cooper	642
2	(Australia) Lydia Lassila	460
3	(Belarus) Alla Tsuper	453
4	(China) Nina Li	405
5	(Switzerland) Evelyne Leu	322

- Standings after 9 races.

=== Ski Cross ===
Rank		Points
1	(France) Ophelie David	646
2	(Slovenia) Saša Farič	447
3	(France) Meryll Boulangeat	428
4	(Norway) Hedda Berntsen	409
5	(Japan) Norihito Fukushima	310

- Standings after 8 races.

=== Halfpipe ===
Rank		Points
1	(Canada) Sarah Burke	280
2	(United States) Jen Hudak	260
3	(Canada) Rosalind Groenewoud	160
4	(Australia) Davina Williams	139
5	(Sweden) Marta Ahrenstedt	85

- Standings after 3 races.

== Nations Cup ==
=== Overall ===
Rank		Points
1	Canada	911
2	United States	623
3	France	491
4	Switzerland	392
5	Japan	320

- Standings after 60 races.

=== Men ===
Rank		Points
1	Canada	529
2	France	318
3	United States	285
4	Switzerland	239
5	Russia	147

- Standings after 30 races.

=== Ladies ===
Rank		Points
1	Canada	382
2	United States	338
3	Australia	231
4	China	191
5	Japan	181

- Standings after 30 races.
