= Sweden at the 2010 Winter Olympics =

- IOC code: SWE
- NOC: Swedish Olympic Committee
- Website: www.sok.se (in Swedish and English)

in Vancouver
- Competitors: 106 in 9 sports
- Flag bearers: Peter Forsberg (opening); Marcus Hellner (closing)
- Medals Ranked 7th: Gold 5 Silver 2 Bronze 5 Total 12

Winter Olympics appearances (overview)
- 1924; 1928; 1932; 1936; 1948; 1952; 1956; 1960; 1964; 1968; 1972; 1976; 1980; 1984; 1988; 1992; 1994; 1998; 2002; 2006; 2010; 2014; 2018; 2022; 2026

Sweden participated at the 2010 Winter Olympics in Vancouver, British Columbia, Canada. 106 competitors competed in nine of the fifteen disciplines.

== Medalists ==
The following Swedish athletes won medals at the games:

Medal	Name	Sport	Event
Gold	Charlotte Kalla	Cross-country skiing	Women's 10 km freestyle
Gold	Björn Ferry	Biathlon	Men's pursuit
Gold	Marcus Hellner	Cross-country skiing	Men's 30 km pursuit
Gold	Marcus Hellner; Johan Olsson; Daniel Rickardsson; Anders Södergren	Cross-country skiing	Men's 4 x 10 km relay
Gold	Kajsa Bergström; Anna Le Moine; Cathrine Lindahl; Eva Lund; Anette Norberg	Curling	Women's
Silver	Anna Haag	Cross-country skiing	Women's 15 km pursuit
Silver	Anna Haag; Charlotte Kalla	Cross-country skiing	Women's team sprint
Bronze	Anja Pärson	Alpine skiing	Women's combined
Bronze	Johan Olsson	Cross-country skiing	Men's 30 km pursuit
Bronze	André Myhrer	Alpine skiing	Men's slalom
Bronze	Johan Olsson	Cross-country skiing	Men's 50 km classical
Bronze	Fredrik Lindström; Carl-Johan Bergman; Mattias Nilsson; Björn Ferry	Biathlon	Men's relay

Medals by sport
Sport	Gold medal	Silver medal	Bronze medal	Total
Cross-country skiing	3	2	2	7
Biathlon	1	0	1	2
Curling	1	0	0	1
Alpine skiing	0	0	2	2
Total	5	2	5	12

Medals by date						Cumulative			
Day	Date	Gold medal	Silver medal	Bronze medal	Total	Gold medal	Silver medal	Bronze medal	Total
Day 1	13th	0	0	0	0	0	0	0	0
Day 2	14th	0	0	0	0	0	0	0	0
Day 3	15th	1	0	0	1	1	0	0	1
Day 4	16th	1	0	0	1	2	0	0	2
Day 5	17th	0	0	0	0	2	0	0	2
Day 6	18th	0	0	1	1	2	0	1	3
Day 7	19th	0	1	0	1	2	1	1	4
Day 8	20th	1	0	1	2	3	1	2	6
Day 9	21st	0	0	0	0	3	1	2	6
Day 10	22nd	0	1	0	1	3	2	2	7
Day 11	23rd	0	0	0	0	3	2	2	7
Day 12	24th	1	0	0	1	4	2	2	8
Day 13	25th	0	0	0	0	4	2	2	8
Day 14	26th	1	0	0	1	5	2	2	9
Day 15	27th	0	0	1	1	5	2	3	10
Day 16	28th	0	0	1	1	5	2	4	11
Reallocation	N/A	0	0	1	1	5	2	5	12
Total		5	2	5	12	5	2	5	12

Multiple medalists
Name	Sport	Gold medal	Silver medal	Bronze medal	Total
Marcus Hellner	Cross-country skiing	2	0	0	2
Charlotte Kalla	Cross-country skiing	1	1	0	2
Johan Olsson	Cross-country skiing	1	0	2	3
Björn Ferry	Biathlon	1	0	1	2
Anna Haag	Cross-country skiing	0	2	0	2

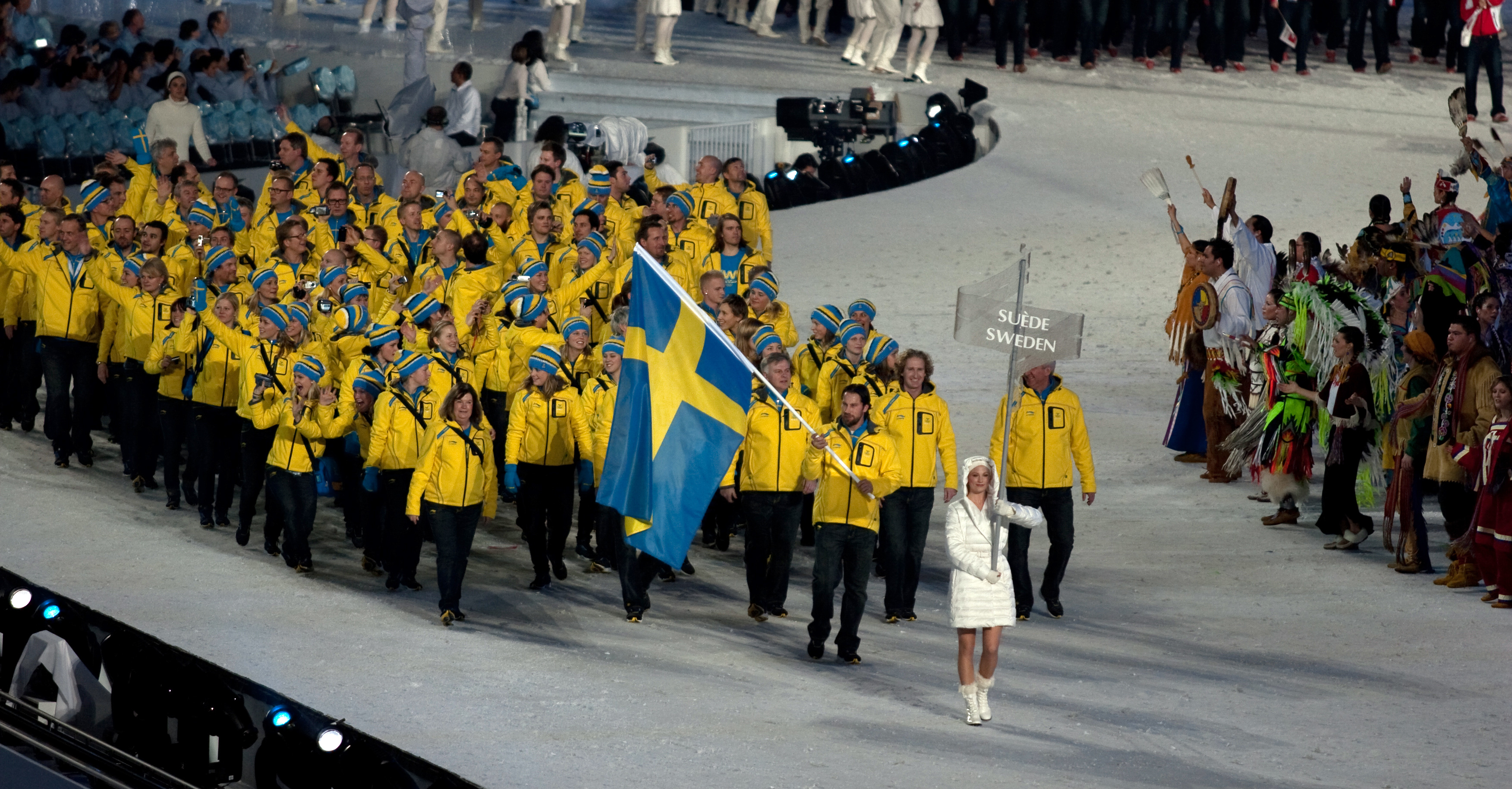
The athletes entering the stadium during the opening ceremonies.

== Alpine skiing ==
Men

Athlete	Event	Final			
Athlete	Event	Run 1	Run 2	Total	Rank
Jens Byggmark	Slalom	50.50	52.03	1:42.53	22
Axel Bäck	Slalom	50.25	Disqualified		
Mattias Hargin	Slalom	49.27	51.98	1.41:25	14
Patrik Järbyn	Downhill			1:56.58	29
Patrik Järbyn	Super-G			did not finish	
Markus Larsson	Downhill			1:58.82	43
Markus Larsson	Giant slalom	1:19.46	1:21.97	2:41.43	27
Markus Larsson	Combined	1:56.51	51.79	2:48.30	16
André Myhrer	Giant slalom	1:24.37	did not finish		
André Myhrer	Slalom	49.03	50.73	1:39.76	Bronze medal
Hans Olsson	Downhill			1:55.19	12
Hans Olsson	Super-G			did not finish	
Hans Olsson	Giant slalom	did not start			
Hans Olsson	Combined	1:53.83	did not finish		

Women

Athlete	Event	Final			
Athlete	Event	Run 1	Run 2	Total	Rank
Therese Borssén	Slalom	52.97	53.74	1:46.71	21
Frida Hansdotter	Slalom	52.50	53.17	1:45.67	15
Kajsa Kling^{[1]}	Giant slalom	1:17.49	1:12.44	2:29.93	26
Jessica Lindell-Vikarby	Downhill			1:53.76	30
Jessica Lindell-Vikarby	Super-G			1:24.83	26
Jessica Lindell-Vikarby	Giant slalom	1:18.34	1:14.37	2:32.71	31
Jessica Lindell-Vikarby	Combined	1:26.47	47.69	2:14.16	22
Maria Pietilä Holmner	Giant slalom	1:16.28	1:13.35	2:29.63	24
Maria Pietilä Holmner	Slalom	51.64	52.58	1:44.22	4
Anja Pärson	Downhill			did not finish	
Anja Pärson	Super-G			1:21.98	11
Anja Pärson	Giant slalom	1:16.01	1:12.89	2:28.90	22
Anja Pärson	Slalom	52.93	did not finish		
Anja Pärson	Combined	1:25.57	44.62	2:10.19	Bronze medal

1. Kajsa Kling was scheduled to participate in the downhill, super-G and combined events as well but withdrew due to illness.

== Biathlon ==
Men

Athlete	Event	Final		
Athlete	Event	Time	Misses	Rank
Carl-Johan Bergman	Sprint	26:41.7	2 (1+1)	42
Carl-Johan Bergman	Pursuit	35:14.6	1 (0+1+0+0)	19
Carl-Johan Bergman	Individual	54:44.1	5 (2+1+0+2)	61
Björn Ferry	Sprint	25:20.2	0 (0+0)	8
Björn Ferry	Pursuit	33:38.4	1 (0+0+0+1)	Gold medal
Björn Ferry	Individual	53:16.7	5 (1+0+3+1)	42
Björn Ferry	Mass start	36:13.3	2 (0+0+0+2)	12
Magnus Jonsson	Sprint	28:29.2	3 (0+3)	79
Magnus Jonsson	Pursuit	did not qualify		
Fredrik Lindström	Sprint	26:33.3	1 (1+0)	38
Fredrik Lindström	Pursuit	36:25.5	4 (0+1+1+2)	33
Fredrik Lindström	Individual	57:29.8	4 (1+2+0+1)	77
Mattias Nilsson	Individual	52:50.1	3 (1+1+0+1)	34
Fredrik Lindström; Carl-Johan Bergman; Mattias Nilsson; Björn Ferry	Relay	1:23:02.0	(0+1),(0+0) (0+1),(0+3) (0+0),(1+3) (0+1),(0+1)	Bronze medal

Women

Athlete	Event	Final		
Athlete	Event	Time	Misses	Rank
Sofia Domeij	Sprint	21:55.0	1 (0+1)	41
Sofia Domeij	Pursuit	34:23.8	2 (1+0+0+1)	41
Elisabeth Högberg	Individual	49:46.5	4 (1+1+0+2)	77
Helena Jonsson	Sprint	20:42.5	0 (0+0)	12
Helena Jonsson	Pursuit	31:53.8	2 (0+0+2+0)	14
Helena Jonsson	Individual	45:52.9	4 (1+2+0+1)	49
Helena Jonsson	Mass start	36:15.9	2 (1+1+0+0)	10
Anna-Maria Nilsson	Sprint	20:45.5	0 (0+0)	16
Anna-Maria Nilsson	Pursuit	35:16.9	6 (1+2+2+1)	47
Anna-Maria Nilsson	Individual	43:44.0	1 (1+0+0+0)	24
Anna-Maria Nilsson	Mass start	39:05.8	4 (1+1+1+1)	28
Anna Carin Olofsson-Zidek	Sprint	20:53.5	1 (1+0)	20
Anna Carin Olofsson-Zidek	Pursuit	30:55.4	1 (1+0+0+0)	4
Anna Carin Olofsson-Zidek	Individual	43:12.1	2 (1+0+0+1)	17
Anna Carin Olofsson-Zidek	Mass start	36:22.9	4 (1+1+1+1)	13
Elisabeth Högberg; Anna Carin Olofsson-Zidek; Anna-Maria Nilsson; Helena Jonsson	Relay	1:10:47.2	(0+0),(0+1) (0+0),(0+0) (0+2),(0+0) (0+0),(0+0)	5

== Cross-country skiing ==
Men

Athlete	Event	Final	
Athlete	Event	Time	Rank
Marcus Hellner	15 km freestyle	34:13.5	4
Marcus Hellner	30 km pursuit	1:15:11.4	Gold medal
Marcus Hellner	50 km classical	2:07:03.2	22
Johan Olsson	15 km freestyle	34:39.3	11
Johan Olsson	30 km pursuit	1:15:14.2	Bronze medal
Johan Olsson	50 km classical	2:05:36.5	Bronze medal
Daniel Rickardsson	15 km freestyle	34:58.7	22
Daniel Rickardsson	30 km pursuit	1:17:34.0	23
Daniel Rickardsson	50 km classical	2:05:45.2	7
Anders Södergren	15 km freestyle	35:01.2	25
Anders Södergren	30 km pursuit	1:15:47.0	10
Anders Södergren	50 km classical	2:05:47.1	9
Daniel Rickardsson; Johan Olsson; Anders Södergren; Marcus Hellner	4 x 10 km relay	1:45:05.4	Gold medal

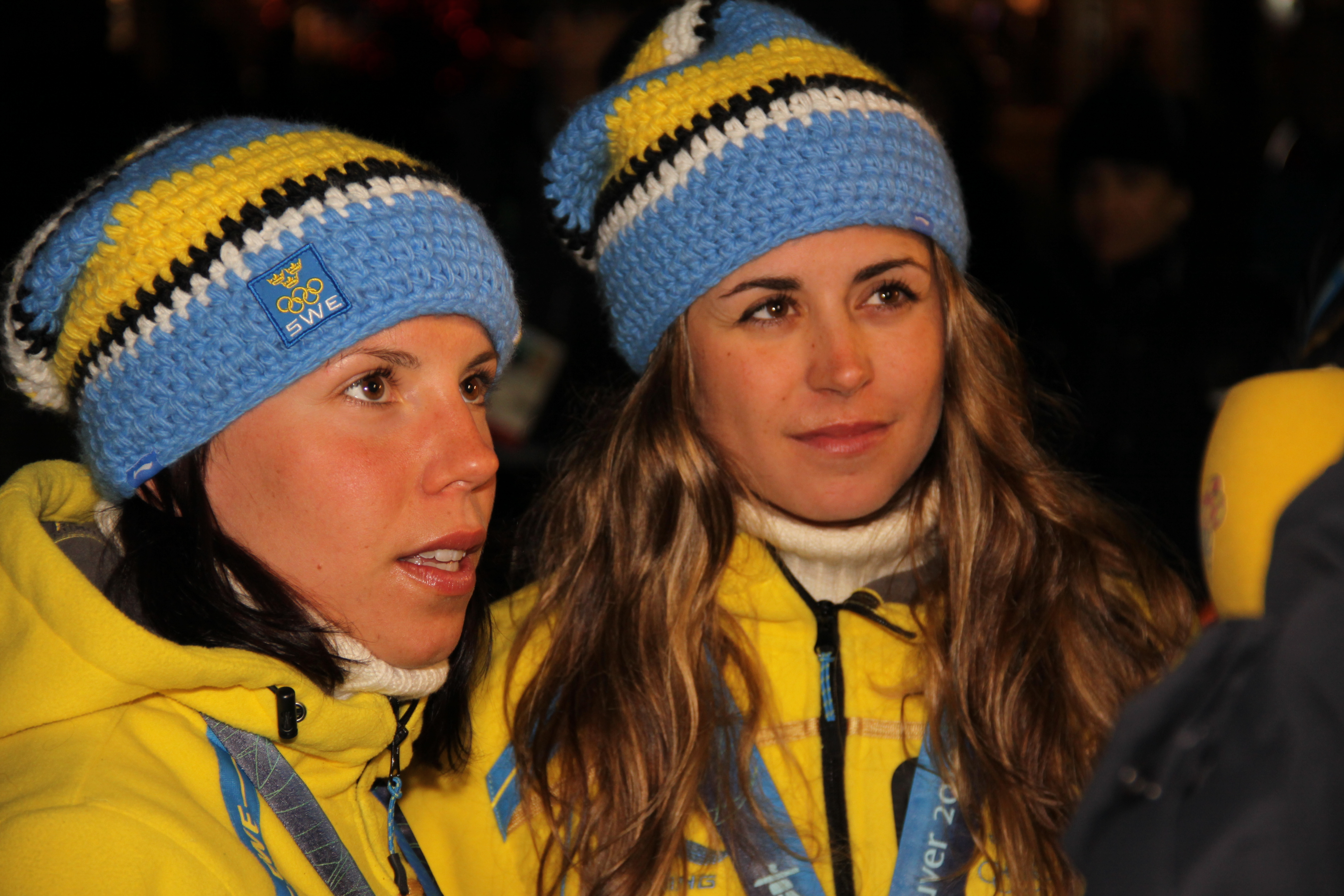
Charlotte Kalla and Anna Haag

Women

Athlete	Event	Final	
Athlete	Event	Time	Rank
Anna Haag^{[2]}	10 km freestyle	25:19.3	4
Anna Haag^{[2]}	15 km pursuit	40:07.0	Silver medal
Ida Ingemarsdotter	15 km pursuit	44:16.5	42
Ida Ingemarsdotter	30 km classical	did not finish	
Charlotte Kalla	10 km freestyle	24:58.4	Gold medal
Charlotte Kalla	15 km pursuit	41:18.5	8
Charlotte Kalla	30 km classical	1:31:57.6	6
Britta Johansson Norgren	10 km freestyle	26:48.1	29
Britta Johansson Norgren	15 km pursuit	45:25.7	53
Anna Olsson	10 km freestyle	26:23.1	24
Anna Olsson	30 km classical	1:33:00.3	9
Anna Olsson; Magdalena Pajala; Charlotte Kalla; Ida Ingemarsdotter	4 x 5 km relay	56:18.9	5

Sprint

Athlete	Event	Qualifying		Quarterfinal		Semifinal		Final	
Athlete	Event	Total	Rank	Total	Rank	Total	Rank	Total	Rank
Hanna Falk	Women's sprint	3:49.94	27 Q	4:22.5	6	did not advance			29
Ida Ingemarsdotter	Women's sprint	3:49.11	25 Q	3:40.0	3	did not advance			15
Emil Jönsson	Men's sprint	3:36.01	2 Q	3:41.8	1 Q	3:37.4	3	DNA	7
Björn Lind	Men's sprint	3:38.62	14 Q	3:37.6	4	did not advance			19
Jesper Modin	Men's sprint	3:38.53	13 Q	3:39.1	4	did not advance			18
Anna Olsson	Women's sprint	3:41.95	3 Q	3:36.5	1 Q	3:38.7	2 Q	3:41.7	4
Magdalena Pajala^{[2]}	Women's sprint	3:45.50	13 Q	3:37.7	2 Q	3:45.0	5	DNA	10
Teodor Peterson	Men's sprint	3:39.08	18 Q	3:38.3	2 Q	3:43.8	6	DNA	11
Marcus Hellner; Teodor Peterson	Men's team sprint					19:06.5	8	DNA	13
Charlotte Kalla; Anna Haag	Women's team sprint					18:35.9	1 Q	18:04.3	Silver medal

2. Anna Haag was scheduled to participate in the 4 x 5 km relay event, and she and Magdalena Pajala were scheduled to participate in the 30 km classical event but withdrew due to illness.

Reigning olympic champion in women's team sprint, Lina Andersson, was also drafted for the team, but was unable to participate due to illness.

== Curling ==
Summary

Team	Event	Group stage										Tiebreaker	Semifinal	Final / BM	
Team	Event	Opposition Score	Opposition Score	Opposition Score	Opposition Score	Opposition Score	Opposition Score	Opposition Score	Opposition Score	Opposition Score	Rank	Opposition Score	Opposition Score	Opposition Score	Rank
Niklas Edin; Sebastian Kraupp; Fredrik Lindberg; Viktor Kjäll; Oskar Eriksson	Men's tournament	GBR; W 6–4	GER; W 6–3	CAN; L 3–7	CHN; W 6–5	USA; L 7–8	FRA; L 4–5	NOR; W 8–7	SUI; L 3–7	DEN; W 7–6	=4 QT	GBR; W 7–6	CAN; L 3–6	SUI; L 4–5	4
Anette Norberg; Eva Lund; Cathrine Lindahl; Anna Le Moine; Kajsa Bergström	Women's tournament	DEN; W 6–5	SUI; W 8–7	GBR; W 6–4	CHN; W 6–4	RUS; L 1–10	USA; W 9–3	CAN; L 2–6	JPN; W 10–6	GER; W 8–7	2 Q	BYE	CHN; W 9–4	CAN; W 7–6	1st place, gold medalist(s)

=== Men's tournament ===
Team: Niklas Edin (skip), Sebastian Kraupp, Fredrik Lindberg, Viktor Kjäll, Oskar Eriksson (alternate).

Round-robin

Draw 1

Sheet A	1	2	3	4	5	6	7	8	9	10	Final
Great Britain (Murdoch)	0	1	0	0	0	0	1	0	2	0	4
Sweden (Edin)	0	0	2	0	0	1	0	2	0	1	6

Draw 2

Sheet D	1	2	3	4	5	6	7	8	9	10	Final
Germany (Kapp)	1	0	0	1	1	0	0	0	0	0	3
Sweden (Edin)	0	0	2	0	0	1	0	1	0	2	6

Draw 3

Sheet C	1	2	3	4	5	6	7	8	9	10	Final
Canada (Martin)	2	0	0	0	3	1	0	0	1	x	7
Sweden (Edin)	0	0	0	1	0	0	1	1	0	x	3

Draw 4

Sheet A	1	2	3	4	5	6	7	8	9	10	11	Final
Sweden (Edin)	0	1	0	0	0	2	0	1	1	0	1	6
China (Wang)	1	0	1	1	0	0	1	0	0	1	0	5

Draw 5

Sheet D	1	2	3	4	5	6	7	8	9	10	11	Final
Sweden (Edin)	0	0	1	0	2	0	3	0	0	1	0	7
United States (Shuster)	1	1	0	2	0	1	0	0	2	0	1	8

Draw 6

Sheet C	1	2	3	4	5	6	7	8	9	10	Final
Sweden (Edin)	1	0	2	0	0	0	1	0	0	0	4
France (Dufour)	0	2	0	0	0	0	0	0	2	1	5

Draw 7

Sheet B	1	2	3	4	5	6	7	8	9	10	Final
Norway (Ulsrud)	2	0	0	2	0	2	0	1	0	0	7
Sweden (Edin)	0	3	0	0	1	0	2	0	1	1	8

Draw 8

Sheet D	1	2	3	4	5	6	7	8	9	10	Final
Switzerland (Stöckli)	1	1	0	2	0	0	0	0	3	x	7
Sweden (Edin)	0	0	2	0	0	0	1	0	0	x	3

Draw 9

Sheet B	1	2	3	4	5	6	7	8	9	10	Final
Sweden (Edin)	3	0	2	1	0	0	0	0	0	1	7
Denmark (Schmidt)	0	1	0	0	2	1	1	0	1	0	6

Standings

Final round robin standings
Team	Skip	Pld	W	L	PF	PA	EW	EL	BE	SE	S%	Qualification
Canada	Kevin Martin	9	9	0	75	36	36	28	14	2	85%	Playoffs
Norway	Thomas Ulsrud	9	7	2	64	43	40	32	15	7	84%	Playoffs
Switzerland	Ralph Stöckli	9	6	3	53	44	35	33	20	8	81%	Playoffs
Sweden	Niklas Edin	9	5	4	50	52	34	36	20	6	82%	Tiebreaker
Great Britain	David Murdoch	9	5	4	57	44	35	29	20	9	81%	Tiebreaker
Germany	Andy Kapp	9	4	5	48	60	35	38	11	9	75%	
France	Thomas Dufour	9	3	6	37	63	22	34	16	7	73%	
China	Wang Fengchun	9	2	7	52	60	37	37	9	7	77%	
Denmark	Ulrik Schmidt	9	2	7	45	63	31	29	12	6	78%	
United States	John Shuster	9	2	7	43	59	32	41	18	9	76%	

Tiebreaker

Sheet A	1	2	3	4	5	6	7	8	9	10	11	Final
Sweden (Edin)	2	0	2	1	0	0	0	1	0	0	1	7
Great Britain (Murdoch)	0	2	0	0	1	1	1	0	0	1	0	6

==== Final rounds ====
Semifinal

Sheet B	1	2	3	4	5	6	7	8	9	10	Final
Sweden (Edin)	0	0	1	0	0	0	0	1	1	x	3
Canada (Martin)	0	1	0	1	2	2	0	0	0	x	6

Bronze medal game

Team	1	2	3	4	5	6	7	8	9	10	Final
Sweden (Edin)	0	1	0	0	2	0	1	0	0	0	4
Switzerland (Stöckli)	1	0	0	1	0	1	0	0	0	2	5

=== Women's tournament ===
Team: Anette Norberg (skip), Eva Lund, Cathrine Lindahl, Anna Le Moine, Kajsa Bergström (alternate).

Round-robin

Draw 1

Sheet B	1	2	3	4	5	6	7	8	9	10	Final
Denmark (Jensen)	0	0	2	0	1	0	0	2	0	0	5
Sweden (Norberg)	0	0	0	1	0	2	0	0	2	1	6

Draw 2

Sheet C	1	2	3	4	5	6	7	8	9	10	11	Final
Switzerland (Ott)	0	2	0	1	0	1	0	1	0	2	0	7
Sweden (Norberg)	1	0	1	0	2	0	2	0	1	0	1	8

Draw 3

Sheet B	1	2	3	4	5	6	7	8	9	10	Final
Great Britain (Muirhead)	0	0	1	0	1	0	1	0	1	0	4
Sweden (Norberg)	1	1	0	2	0	0	0	1	0	1	6

Draw 6

Sheet B	1	2	3	4	5	6	7	8	9	10	Final
Sweden (Norberg)	1	0	1	0	2	0	0	1	0	1	6
China (Wang)	0	0	0	1	0	0	1	0	2	0	4

Draw 7

Sheet A	1	2	3	4	5	6	7	8	9	10	Final
Sweden (Norberg)	0	0	0	0	0	1	0	x	x	x	1
Russia (Privivkova)	0	1	3	1	2	0	3	x	x	x	10

Draw 9

Sheet D	1	2	3	4	5	6	7	8	9	10	Final
United States (McCormick)	0	0	1	0	1	0	1	0	0	x	3
Sweden (Norberg)	1	0	0	2	0	3	0	0	3	x	9

Draw 10

Sheet C	1	2	3	4	5	6	7	8	9	10	Final
Sweden (Norberg)	0	0	0	0	1	0	0	0	1	x	2
Canada (Bernard)	0	2	1	1	0	0	1	1	0	x	6

Draw 11

Sheet A	1	2	3	4	5	6	7	8	9	10	Final
Japan (Meguro)	0	1	0	1	0	3	0	1	0	x	6
Sweden (Norberg)	2	0	3	0	1	0	2	0	2	x	10

Draw 12

Sheet D	1	2	3	4	5	6	7	8	9	10	Final
Sweden (Norberg)	2	0	3	0	2	0	1	0	0	0	8
Germany (Schöpp)	0	2	0	2	0	0	0	2	0	1	7

Standings

Final round robin standings
Team	Skip	Pld	W	L	PF	PA	EW	EL	BE	SE	S%	Qualification
Canada	Cheryl Bernard	9	8	1	56	37	40	29	20	13	81%	Playoffs
Sweden	Anette Norberg	9	7	2	56	52	36	36	13	5	79%	Playoffs
China	Wang Bingyu	9	6	3	61	47	39	37	12	7	74%	Playoffs
Switzerland	Mirjam Ott	9	6	3	67	48	40	36	7	12	76%	Playoffs
Denmark	Angelina Jensen	9	4	5	49	61	31	40	15	5	74%	
Germany	Andrea Schöpp	9	3	6	52	56	35	40	15	4	75%	
Great Britain	Eve Muirhead	9	3	6	54	59	36	41	11	10	75%	
Japan	Moe Meguro	9	3	6	64	70	36	37	13	5	73%	
Russia	Liudmila Privivkova	9	3	6	53	60	36	40	14	13	77%	
United States	Debbie McCormick	9	2	7	43	65	36	36	12	12	77%	

==== Final rounds ====
Semifinal

Team	1	2	3	4	5	6	7	8	9	10	Final
China (Wang)	0	0	0	1	0	1	1	0	1	x	4
Sweden (Norberg)	1	1	1	0	3	0	0	3	0	x	9

Final

Sheet C	1	2	3	4	5	6	7	8	9	10	11	Final
Canada (Bernard)	0	1	0	1	0	1	2	0	1	0	0	6
Sweden (Norberg)	0	0	2	0	2	0	0	0	0	2	1	7

== Figure skating ==
Sweden has qualified one entrant in men's singles, for a total of one athlete.

Athlete(s)	Event	CD		SP/OD		FS/FD		Total	
Athlete(s)	Event	Points	Rank	Points	Rank	Points	Rank	Points	Rank
Adrian Schultheiss	Men			63.13	22 Q	137.31	13	200.44	15

== Freestyle skiing ==
Men

Athlete	Event	Qualifying		Final	
Athlete	Event	Points	Rank	Points	Rank
Jesper Björnlund	Moguls	24.53	5 Q	25.12	8
Per Spett	Moguls	22.10	23	did not advance	

Athlete	Event	Qualifying		1/8 finals	1/4 finals	Semifinals	Final
Athlete	Event	Time	Rank	Rank	Rank	Rank	Rank
Tommy Eliasson	Ski cross	1:14.73	23 Q	2 Q	3	DNA	13
Michael Forslund	Ski cross	1:14.66	21 Q	4	did not advance		27
Erik Iljans	Ski cross	1:16.34	32 Q	2 Q	4	DNA	16
Lars Lewén	Ski cross	1:14.44	19 Q	4	did not advance		24

Women

Athlete	Event	Qualifying		1/8 finals	1/4 finals	Semifinals	Final
Athlete	Event	Time	Rank	Rank	Rank	Rank	Rank
Anna Holmlund	Ski cross	1:17.15	1 Q	1 Q	2 Q	4	6
Magdalena Iljans	Ski cross	1:19.05	11 Q	2 Q	3 (DNF)	DNA	10

== Ice hockey ==
Summary

Key:

- OT – Overtime
- GWS – Match decided by penalty-shootout

Team	Event	Group stage				Qualification playoff	Quarterfinal	Semifinal / Pl.	Final / BM / Pl.	
Team	Event	Opposition Score	Opposition Score	Opposition Score	Rank	Opposition Score	Opposition Score	Opposition Score	Opposition Score	Rank
Sweden men's	Men's tournament	Germany; W 2–0	Belarus; W 4–2	Finland; W 3–0	1 QQ	BYE	Slovakia; L 3–4	did not advance		5
Sweden women's	Women's tournament	Switzerland; W 3–0	Slovakia; W 6–2	Canada; L 1–13	2 Q	—N/a		United States; L 1–9	Finland; L 2–3 OT	4

=== Men's tournament ===
Sweden went into the tournament as the ruling Olympic champions.

Roster

The following is the Swedish roster in the men's ice hockey tournament of the 2010 Winter Olympics.

No.	Pos.	Name	Height	Weight	Birthdate	Birthplace	2009–10 team
50	G	Jonas Gustavsson	191 cm (6 ft 3 in)	87 kg (192 lb)	24 October 1984	Danderyd	(Canada) Toronto Maple Leafs (NHL)
1	G	Stefan Liv	183 cm (6 ft 0 in)	80 kg (180 lb)	21 December 1980	Gdynia, Poland	(Sweden) HV71 (SEL)
30	G	Henrik Lundqvist	185 cm (6 ft 1 in)	88 kg (194 lb)	2 March 1982	Åre	(United States) New York Rangers (NHL)
39	D	Tobias Enström	178 cm (5 ft 10 in)	79 kg (174 lb)	5 November 1984	Nordingrå	(United States) Atlanta Thrashers (NHL)
6	D	Magnus Johansson	178 cm (5 ft 10 in)	82 kg (181 lb)	4 September 1973	Linköping	(Sweden) Linköping (SEL)
55	D	Niklas Kronwall	183 cm (6 ft 0 in)	86 kg (190 lb)	12 January 1981	Stockholm	(United States) Detroit Red Wings (NHL)
5	D	Nicklas Lidström – C	188 cm (6 ft 2 in)	86 kg (190 lb)	28 April 1970	Avesta	(United States) Detroit Red Wings (NHL)
3	D	Douglas Murray	191 cm (6 ft 3 in)	109 kg (240 lb)	12 March 1980	Bromma	(United States) San Jose Sharks (NHL)
29	D	Johnny Oduya	183 cm (6 ft 0 in)	91 kg (201 lb)	1 October 1981	Stockholm	(United States) Atlanta Thrashers (NHL)
10	D	Henrik Tallinder	191 cm (6 ft 3 in)	98 kg (216 lb)	10 January 1979	Stockholm	(United States) Buffalo Sabres (NHL)
2	D	Mattias Öhlund	191 cm (6 ft 3 in)	100 kg (220 lb)	9 September 1976	Piteå	(United States) Tampa Bay Lightning (NHL)
11	F	Daniel Alfredsson – A	180 cm (5 ft 11 in)	93 kg (205 lb)	11 December 1972	Gothenburg	(Canada) Ottawa Senators (NHL)
19	F	Nicklas Bäckström	185 cm (6 ft 1 in)	95 kg (209 lb)	23 November 1987	Gävle	(United States) Washington Capitals (NHL)
91	F	Loui Eriksson	185 cm (6 ft 1 in)	83 kg (183 lb)	17 July 1985	Gothenburg	(United States) Dallas Stars (NHL)
21	F	Peter Forsberg	183 cm (6 ft 0 in)	95 kg (209 lb)	20 July 1973	Örnsköldsvik	(Sweden) Modo (SEL)
93	F	Johan Franzén	191 cm (6 ft 3 in)	100 kg (220 lb)	23 December 1979	Vetlanda	(United States) Detroit Red Wings (NHL)
27	F	Patric Hörnqvist	180 cm (5 ft 11 in)	85 kg (187 lb)	1 January 1987	Sollentuna	(United States) Nashville Predators (NHL)
33	F	Fredrik Modin	193 cm (6 ft 4 in)	101 kg (223 lb)	8 October 1974	Sundsvall	(United States) Columbus Blue Jackets (NHL)
26	F	Samuel Påhlsson	183 cm (6 ft 0 in)	96 kg (212 lb)	17 December 1977	Ånge	(United States) Columbus Blue Jackets (NHL)
22	F	Daniel Sedin	185 cm (6 ft 1 in)	83 kg (183 lb)	26 September 1980	Örnsköldsvik	(Canada) Vancouver Canucks (NHL)
20	F	Henrik Sedin	188 cm (6 ft 2 in)	83 kg (183 lb)	26 September 1980	Örnsköldsvik	(Canada) Vancouver Canucks (NHL)
80	F	Mattias Weinhandl	182 cm (6 ft 0 in)	85 kg (187 lb)	1 June 1980	Ljungby	(Russia) Dynamo Moscow (KHL)
40	F	Henrik Zetterberg – A	180 cm (5 ft 11 in)	88 kg (194 lb)	9 October 1980	Njurunda	(United States) Detroit Red Wings (NHL)

Forward Tomas Holmström was selected, but due to a knee injury he was replaced by Johan Franzén.

==== Group play ====
All times are local (UTC-8).

17 February 2010; 16:30	Sweden	2–0 (0–0, 2–0, 0–0)	Germany	Canada Hockey Place, Vancouver; Attendance: 16,966

Game reference
Henrik Lundqvist	Goalies	Thomas Greiss	Referees: (Canada) Marc Joannette (Canada) Guy Pellerin; Linesmen: (Ukraine) Andriy Kicha (United States) Thor Nelson
M. Öhlund (T. Enström, M. Weinhandl) (PP) – 24:29 / 1–0; L. Eriksson (N. Bäckström) – 34:13 / 2–0			Referees: (Canada) Marc Joannette (Canada) Guy Pellerin; Linesmen: (Ukraine) Andriy Kicha (United States) Thor Nelson
18 min	Penalties	22 min	Referees: (Canada) Marc Joannette (Canada) Guy Pellerin; Linesmen: (Ukraine) Andriy Kicha (United States) Thor Nelson
25	Shots	21	Referees: (Canada) Marc Joannette (Canada) Guy Pellerin; Linesmen: (Ukraine) Andriy Kicha (United States) Thor Nelson

19 February 2010; 12:00	Belarus	2–4 (0–2, 1–1, 1–1)	Sweden	Canada Hockey Place, Vancouver; Attendance: 16,878

Game reference

Andrei Mezin
Goalies
Jonas Gustavsson
Referees:
(United States) Dennis LaRue
(Switzerland) Brent Reiber
Linesmen:
(United States) Brian Murphy
(Russia) Yuri Oskirko

	0–1	6:40 – D. Sedin (H. Sedin, M. Weinhandl)
	0–2	9:04 – D. Alfredsson (M. Johansson, N. Bäckström) (PP)
	0–3	29:35 – J. Franzén (S. Påhlsson, F. Modin)
D. Meleshko (N. Stasenko, A. Ryadinsky) (PP) – 34:40	1–3
D. Meleshko (A. Kulakov) – 51:33	2–3
	2–4	59:49 – D. Alfredsson (H. Sedin, D. Sedin)

8 min
Penalties
4 min
19
Shots
38

21 February 2010; 21:00	Sweden	3–0 (1–0, 2–0, 0–0)	Finland	Canada Hockey Place, Vancouver; Attendance: 17,410

Game reference

Henrik Lundqvist
Goalies
Miikka Kiprusoff
Referees:
(Canada) Marc Joannette
(Switzerland) Danny Kurmann
Linesmen:
(United States) Tim Nowak
(Russia) Yuri Oskirko

L. Eriksson (N. Bäckström, M. Johansson) (PP2) – 6:41	1–0
N. Bäckström (D. Sedin) – 24:19	2–0
L. Eriksson (J. Franzén, N. Bäckström) (PP) – 38:08	3–0

14 min
Penalties
33 min
32
Shots
20

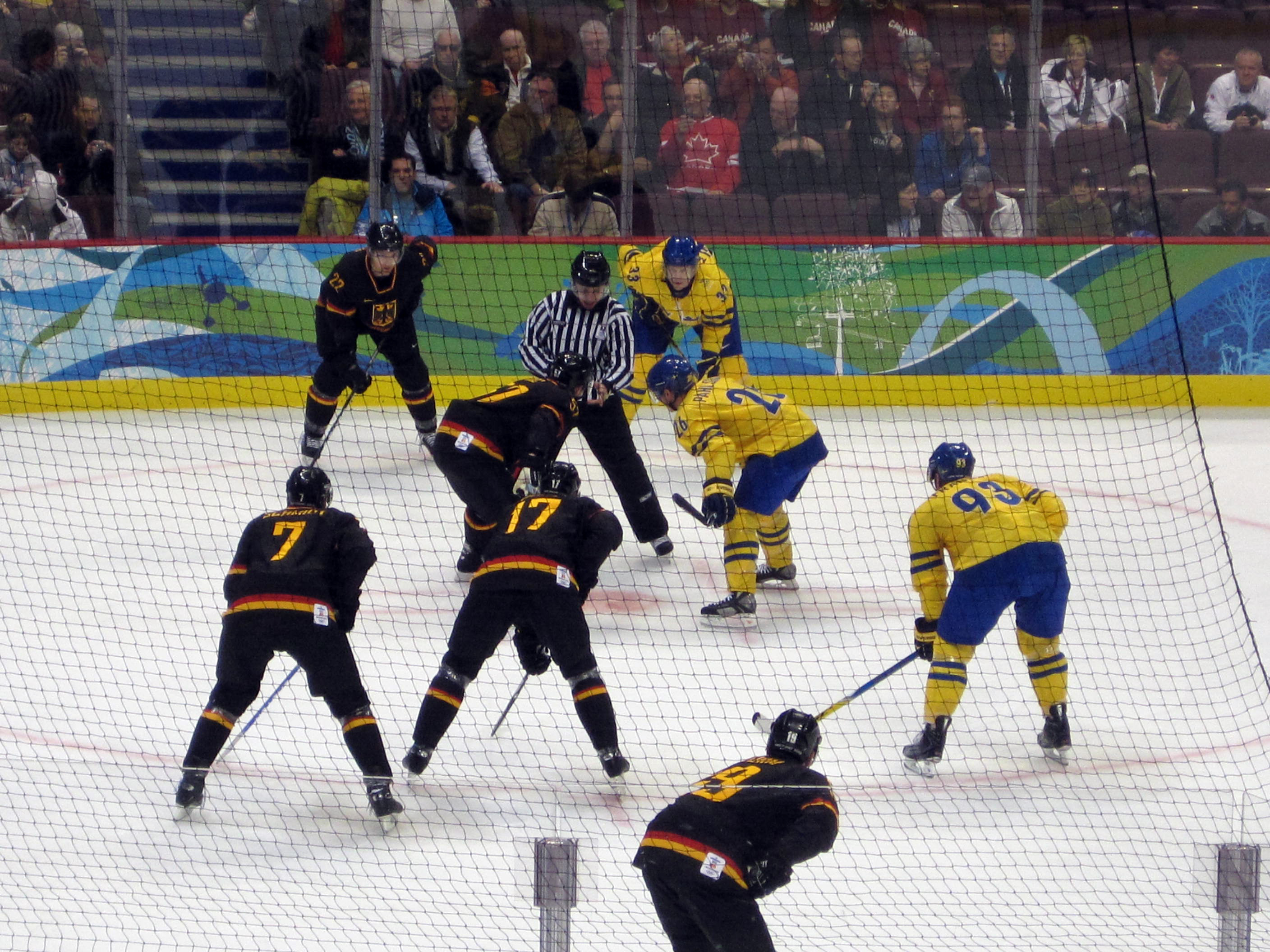
The Swedish team in action against Germany.

Standings

Team	Pld	W	OTW	OTL	L	GF	GA	GD	Pts	Qualification
Sweden	3	3	0	0	0	9	2	+7	9	Quarterfinals
Finland	3	2	0	0	1	10	4	+6	6	Quarterfinals
Belarus	3	1	0	0	2	8	12	−4	3	
Germany	3	0	0	0	3	3	12	−9	0	

Source: IIHF

==== Final rounds ====
Quarterfinal

24 February 2010; 21:00	Sweden	3–4 (0–0, 2–3, 1–1)	Slovakia	Canada Hockey Place, Vancouver; Attendance: 17,493

Game reference

Henrik Lundqvist
Goalies
Jaroslav Halák
Referees:
(Canada) Bill McCreary
(Finland) Jyri Rönn
Linesmen:
(United States) Peter Feola
(Canada) Jean Morin

	0–1	27:34 – M. Gáborík (Mari. Hossa, P. Demitra) (PP)
	0–2	28:11 – A. Sekera (R. Zedník, Ž. Pálffy)
P. Hörnqvist (P. Forsberg) – 33:49	1–2
H. Zetterberg (T. Enström) – 34:26	2–2
	2–3	39:12 – P. Demitra (Z. Chára, Mari. Hossa) (PP)
	2–4	49:01 – T. Kopecký (Mari. Hossa, Demitra)
D. Alfredsson (N. Bäckström, L. Eriksson) – 49:39	3–4

10 min
Penalties
6 min
29
Shots
14

=== Women's tournament ===
Sweden is looking to improve on the silver medal from the previous tournament.

Roster

The following is the Swedish roster in the women's ice hockey tournament of the 2010 Winter Olympics.

Position	Name	Height	Weight	Birthdate	Birthplace	2009–10 team
G	Sara Grahn	171 cm (5 ft 7 1/2 in)	71 kg (157 lb; 11.2 st)	25 September 1988	Örebro	Linköpings HC
G	Valentina Lizana	170 cm (5 ft 7 in)	68 kg (150 lb; 10.7 st)	30 March 1990	Trångsund	AIK
G	Kim Martin	166 cm (5 ft 5 1/2 in)	66 kg (146 lb; 10.4 st)	28 February 1986	Stockholm	Minnesota Duluth Bulldogs
D	Emilia Andersson	175 cm (5 ft 9 in)	73 kg (161 lb; 11.5 st)	31 August 1988	Stockholm	Segeltorps IF
D	Gunilla Andersson	169 cm (5 ft 6 1/2 in)	69 kg (152 lb; 10.9 st)	26 April 1975	Skutskär	Segeltorps IF
D	Jenni Asserholt – A	172 cm (5 ft 7 1/2 in)	73 kg (161 lb; 11.5 st)	8 April 1988	Örebro	Linköpings HC
D	Emma Eliasson	166 cm (5 ft 5 1/2 in)	70 kg (150 lb; 11 st)	12 June 1989	Kiruna	Brynäs IF
D	Frida Nevalainen	165 cm (5 ft 5 in)	64 kg (141 lb; 10.1 st)	27 January 1987	Umeå	Modo Hockey
D	Emma Nordin	168 cm (5 ft 6 in)	69 kg (152 lb; 10.9 st)	22 March 1991	Örnsköldsvik	Modo Hockey
F	Tina Enström	166 cm (5 ft 5 1/2 in)	64 kg (141 lb; 10.1 st)	23 March 1991	Örnsköldsvik	Modo Hockey
F	Elin Holmlöv	173 cm (5 ft 8 in)	73 kg (161 lb; 11.5 st)	8 May 1987	Knivsta	Segeltorps IF
F	Erika Holst – C	179 cm (5 ft 10 1/2 in)	82 kg (181 lb; 12.9 st)	8 April 1979	Varberg	Segeltorps IF
F	Isabelle Jordansson	170 cm (5 ft 7 in)	70 kg (150 lb; 11 st)	8 March 1991	Danderyd	AIK
F	Klara Myrén	172 cm (5 ft 7 1/2 in)	69 kg (152 lb; 10.9 st)	25 May 1991	Borlänge	Leksands IF
F	Cecilia Östberg	166 cm (5 ft 5 1/2 in)	64 kg (141 lb; 10.1 st)	15 January 1991	Leksand	Leksands IF
F	Maria Rooth – A	176 cm (5 ft 9 1/2 in)	72 kg (159 lb; 11.3 st)	2 November 1979	Ängelholm	AIK
F	Danijela Rundqvist	178 cm (5 ft 10 in)	75 kg (165 lb; 11.8 st)	26 September 1984	Stockholm	AIK
F	Frida Svedin Thunström	172 cm (5 ft 7 1/2 in)	75 kg (165 lb; 11.8 st)	4 November 1989	Sundsvall	Modo Hockey
F	Katarina Timglas	168 cm (5 ft 6 in)	63 kg (139 lb; 9.9 st)	24 November 1985	Malmö	AIK
F	Erica Udén Johansson	170 cm (5 ft 7 in)	69 kg (152 lb; 10.9 st)	20 July 1989	Sundsvall	Segeltorps IF
F	Pernilla Winberg	165 cm (5 ft 5 in)	63 kg (139 lb; 9.9 st)	24 February 1989	Limhamn	Segeltorps IF

==== Group play ====
Sweden will play in Group A. All times are local (UTC-8).

13 February 2010; 12:00	Sweden	3–0 (1–0, 1–0, 1–0)	Switzerland	UBC Winter Sports Centre, Vancouver; Attendance: 5,222

Game reference

Kim Martin
Goalies
Florence Schelling
Referee:
Leah Wrazidlo (United States)

Rundqvist (Udén Johansson, Svedin Thunström) – 12:31	1–0
Enström (Östberg, Myrén) – 31:35	2–0
Udén Johansson (Nevalainen) – 41:50	3–0

14 min
Penalties
6 min
34
Shots
16

15 February 2010; 19:00	Sweden	6–2 (3–2, 1–0, 2–0)	Slovakia	UBC Winter Sports Centre, Vancouver; Attendance: 5,323

Game reference

Sara Grahn
Goalies
Zuzana Tomčíková
Referee:
Aina Høve (Norway)

Winberg (Holmlöv, Holst) (PP) – 5:01	1–0
	1–1	9:52 – Džurňáková (Babonyová, Herichová)
Winberg (Eliasson, Holmlöv) (PP) – 12:11	2–1
	2–2	13:29 – Čupková (Čulíková, Kapustová)
Asserholt (Myrén, Östberg) – 16:07	3–2
Winberg (E. Andersson) – 29:07	4–2
Holmlöv (Holst, G. Andersson) (PP) – 46:08	5–2
Winberg (Nordin) – 53:20	6–2

10 min
Penalties
16 min
48
Shots
16

17 February 2010; 14:30	Canada	13–1 (5–0, 7–0, 1–1)	Sweden	UBC Winter Sports Centre, Vancouver; Attendance: 5,483

Game reference

Kim St-Pierre (out 40:00) / Charline Labonté (in 40:00)
Goalies
Kim Martin (out 28:47) / Sara Grahn (in 28:47)
Referee:
Leah Wrazidlo (United States)

Agosta (Piper, Ouellette) – 06:58	1–0
Poulin (Agosta, Wickenheiser) – 09:16	2–0
Piper (Wickenheiser, Sostorics) – 13:00	3–0
Vaillancourt (Johnston, Sostorics) – 15:27	4–0
Bonhomme (Agosta) – 15:57	5–0
Agosta (Hefford) – 21:06	6–0
Hefford (Ouellette, Kellar) – 25:36	7–0
Wickenheiser (Apps) – 25:14	8–0
Apps (Irwin, Piper) – 26:13	9–0
Agosta (Ouellette) (PP) – 27:59	10–0
Piper (Wickenheiser) – 29:17	11–0
Irwin (Vaillancourt, Ward) (PP) – 31:43	12–0
Apps (MacLeod, Wickenheiser) – 47:43	13–0
	13–1	52:16 – Timglas (Jordansson, Rooth) (PP)

8 min
Penalties
16 min
52
Shots
13

Standings

Team	Pld	W	OTW	OTL	L	GF	GA	GD	Pts	Qualification
Canada	3	3	0	0	0	41	2	+39	9	Semifinals
Sweden	3	2	0	0	1	10	15	−5	6	Semifinals
Switzerland	3	1	0	0	2	6	15	−9	3	5–8th classification
Slovakia	3	0	0	0	3	4	29	−25	0	5–8th classification

Source: ESPN

==== Final rounds ====
Semifinal

22 February 2010; 12:00	Sweden	1–9 (0–2, 1–3, 0–4)	United States	Canada Hockey Place, Vancouver; Attendance: 16,021

Game reference

Kim Martin
Goalies
Jessie Vetter
Referee:
Mary Anne Gage (Canada)

	0–1	7:14 – M. Lamoureux (Potter, Knight)
	0–2	8:23 – Duggan (Cahow, Stack) (PP)
	0–3	23:22 – Ruggiero (J. Lamoureux)
	0–4	25:58 – Cahow (Thatcher)
Winberg (Jordansson) (PP) – 29:34	1–4
	1–5	33:35 – Thatcher (J. Lamoureux, Lawler)
	1–6	45:59 – M. Lamoureux (Potter, Engstrom) (PP)
	1–7	47:15 – Weiland (Lawler)
	1–8	55:20 – Stack (Chu, Engstrom)
	1–9	57:19 – M. Lamoureux (Knight) (PP)

10 min
Penalties
8 min
12
Shots
46

Bronze medal game

25 February 2010; 11:00	Sweden	2–3 (OT) (0–0, 1–2, 1–0, 0–1)	Finland (bronze)	Canada Hockey Place, Vancouver; Attendance: 16,398

Game reference

Sara Grahn
Goalies
Noora Räty
Referee:
Nicole Hertrich (Germany)

	0–1	24:24 – Pelttari
Rooth (Jordansson, Eliasson) (PP) – 32:24	1–1
	1–2	36:02 – Karvinen (Välimäki)
Rundqvist (G. Andersson, Holmlöv) (PP) – 45:09	2–2
	2–3	62:33 – Rantamäki (Tuominen, Hiirikoski)

12 min
Penalties
14 min
18
Shots
24

== Snowboarding ==
Athlete	Event	Qualification		Round of 16	Quarterfinals	Semifinals	Finals	
Athlete	Event	Time	Rank	Opposition time	Opposition time	Opposition time	Opposition time	Rank
Daniel Biveson	Men's parallel giant slalom	1:17.86	8 Q	Mathieu Bozzetto +0.36	did not advance			14

== Speed skating ==
Men

Athlete	Event	Final	
Athlete	Event	Time	Rank
Joel Eriksson	Men's 1500 m	1:49.08	24
Daniel Friberg	Men's 1500 m	1:49.13	25
Johan Röjler	Men's 1500 m	1:49.50	28
Johan Röjler	Men's 5000 m	6:35.88	21

Team pursuit

Athlete	Event	Quarterfinal	Semifinal	Final	
Athlete	Event	Opposition time	Opposition time	Opposition time	Rank
Joel Eriksson; Daniel Friberg; Johan Röjler	Men's team pursuit	Netherlands; 3:46.40; L	did not advance	Japan; 3:46.18; W	7

== See also ==
- Sweden at the 2010 Winter Paralympics
