= Martin Fiala =

German freestyle skier (born 1968)

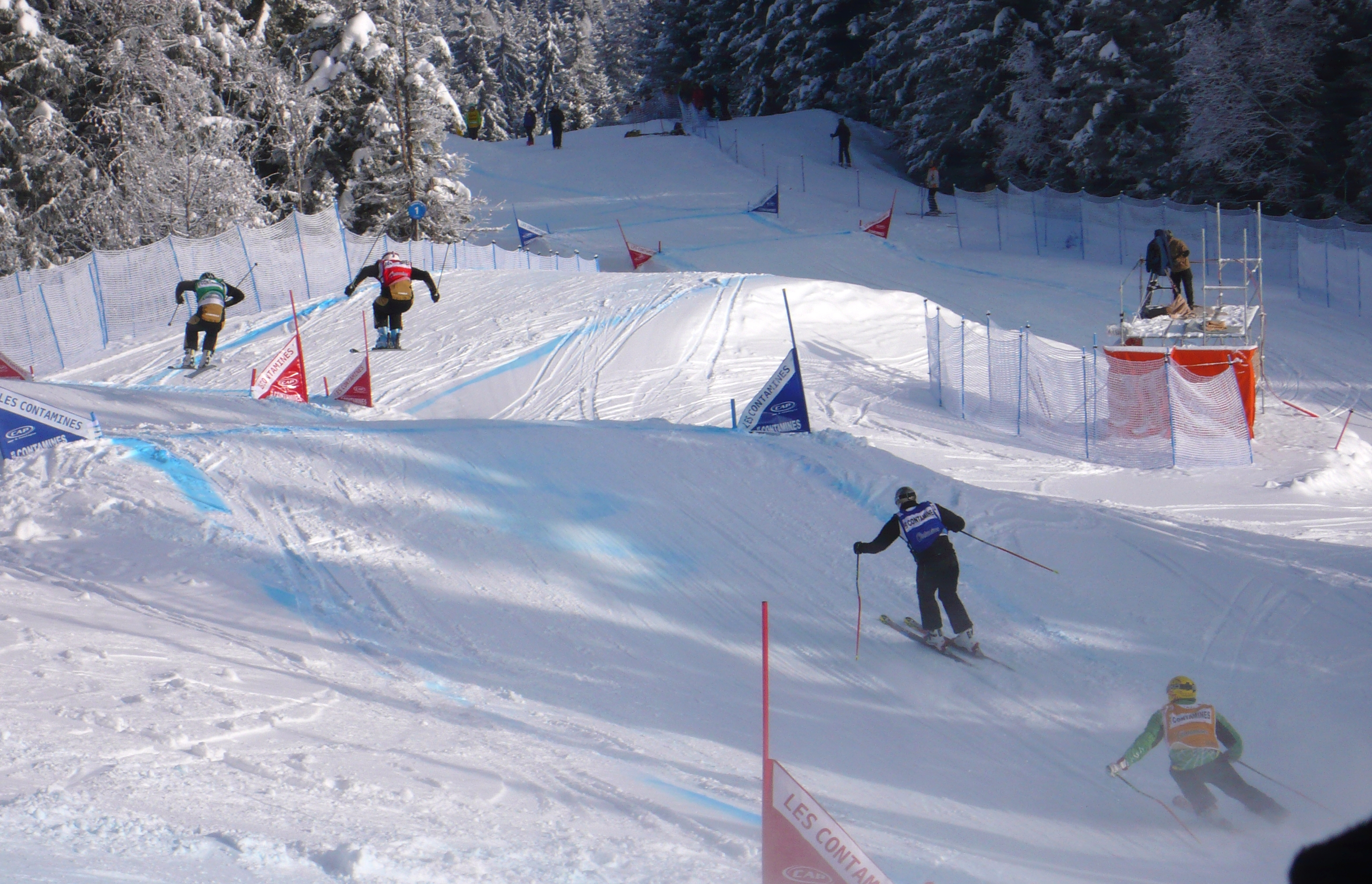

Personal information
- Born: January 25, 1968 (age 58) Prague, Czechoslovakia

Sport
- Sport: Skiing
- Updated on March 31, 2013

Martin Fiala (born January 25, 1968, in Prague) is a retired Czech-born German freestyle skier, specializing in ski cross and a former World Cup alpine skier.

Fiala competed at the 2010 Winter Olympics for Germany. He placed 29th in the qualifying round in ski cross, to advance to the knockout stages. He finished 3rd in his first round heat, failing to advance to the quarterfinals.

As of March 2013, his best showing at the Alpine World Championships is 14th, in the 1991 combined.

Fiala made his Alpine World Cup debut in December 1992. His best finish was 11th, in a combined event at Garmisch. His best overall World Cup position was 108th, in 1992/93. Fiala made his Freestyle World Cup debut in March 2009. As of March 2013, his best finish was 14th, at Alpe d'Huez in 2009/10. His best World Cup overall finish in ski cross is 35th, in 2009/10.
