= Davey Barr =

Canadian freestyle skier

Personal information
- Born: March 3, 1977 (age 49) Whistler, British Columbia, Canada
- Height: 1.78 m (5 ft 10 in)
- Weight: 83.9 kg (185 lb; 13.21 st)
- Website: www.daveybarr.com

Sport
- Country: Canada
Medal record
Men's Freestyle skiing
Representing Canada
FIS Freestyle World Ski Championships
| Bronze medal – third place | 2009 Inawashiro | Ski Cross |
Winter X Games
| Silver medal – second place | 2005 Aspen | Ski Cross |

Davey Barr (born March 3, 1977) is a Canadian freestyle skier currently residing in Whistler, British Columbia. Davey Barr is a member of the Canadian national ski cross team.

Barr managed his first world championship medal, a bronze, in 2009. His highest ranking on the World Cup tour was 3rd during the 2007–08 season. Barr won the first ever FIS world cup ski cross event held in North America at Deer Valley in 2008. The 2010 Vancouver Olympics will be taking place in his hometown of Whistler, British Columbia. Davey Barr was not originally selected by the Canadian Freestyle Ski Association to attend those games; however, he attended as a replacement for Brady Leman of Calgary, Alberta. Leman himself was a replacement for Dave Duncan who broke his right clavicle bone during a training run.

Barr qualified for the 1/8 finals with a time of 1:14:98, ranking him 25th out of 33 skiers. There, he avoided a near-collision between Simon Stickl of Germany and Anders Rekdal of Denmark to finish second. In the quarterfinals, Barr fought against Kerr, only to surpass him on the first turn and remain second throughout the heat. The semifinals saw Barr struggle to retain his position in third, sending him to the B-Final. Barr trailed the pack for the grand majority of the race, until a fall by Slovenia's Filip Flisar caused Australia's Scott Kneller to ski off-course, allowing him to place sixth overall.
