= Richard Spalinger =

Swiss freestyle skier

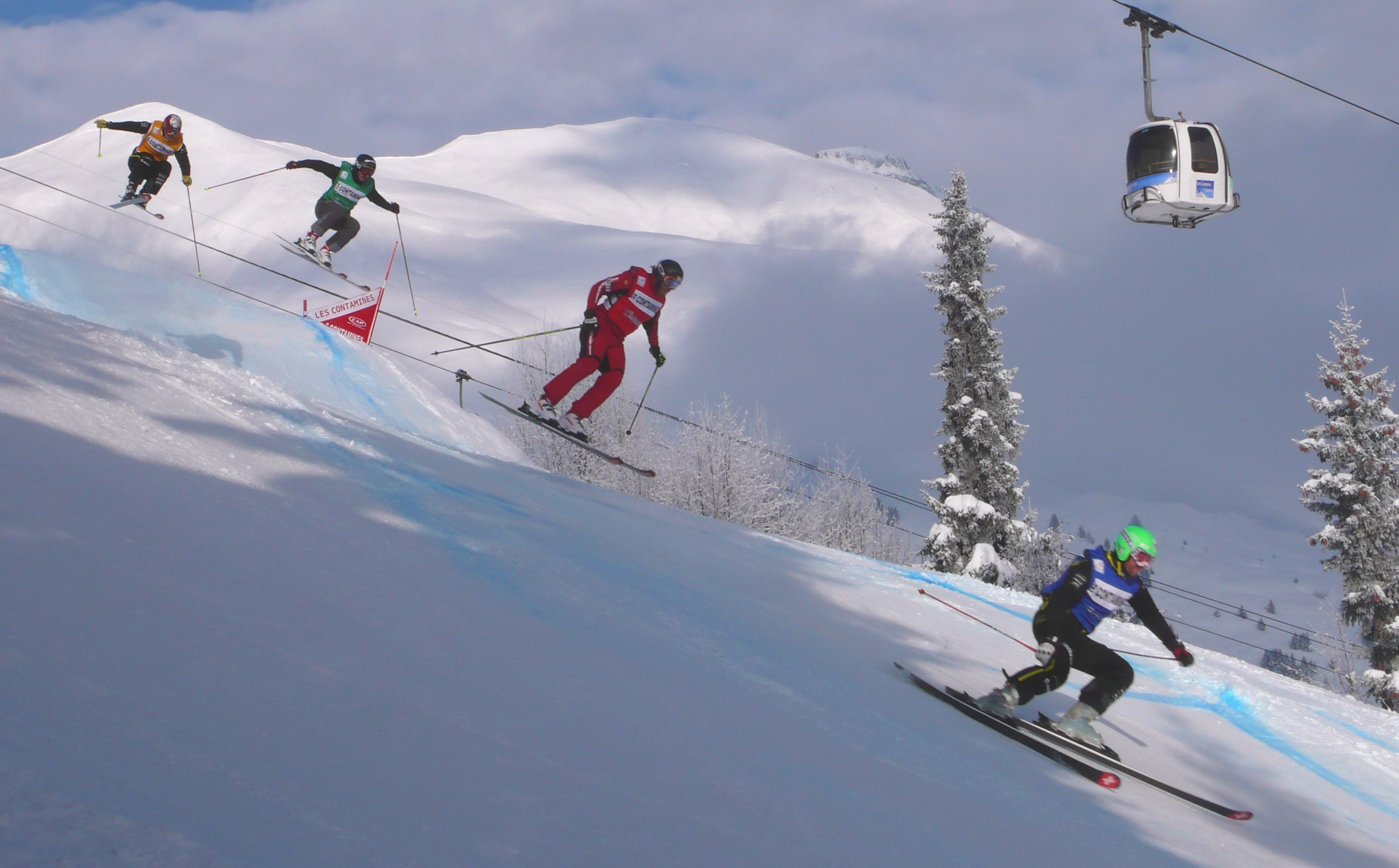

Personal information
- Born: 18 February 1975 (age 51) Zweisimmen, Switzerland

Sport
- Sport: Skiing

World Cup career
- Indiv. podiums: 1
- Updated on 28 March 2013

Richard Spalinger (born 18 February 1975 in Zweisimmen) is a Swiss freestyle skier, specializing in ski cross.

Spalinger competed at the 2010 Winter Olympics for Switzerland. He placed 27th in the qualifying round in ski cross, to advance to the knockout stages. He advanced from the first round by finishing second in his heat, but finished 4th in his quarterfinal, failing to advance to the semifinals.

As of March 2013, his best showing at the World Championships is 10th, in 2005.

Spalinger made his World Cup debut in January 2008. As of March 2013, he has one World Cup podium finish, a bronze at Flaine in 2007/08. His best World Cup overall finish in ski cross is 13th, in 2004/05.

== World Cup podiums ==
Date	Location	Rank	Event
16 January 2008	Flaine	3rd place, bronze medalist(s)	Ski cross
