= Beni Hofer =

Swiss freestyle skier

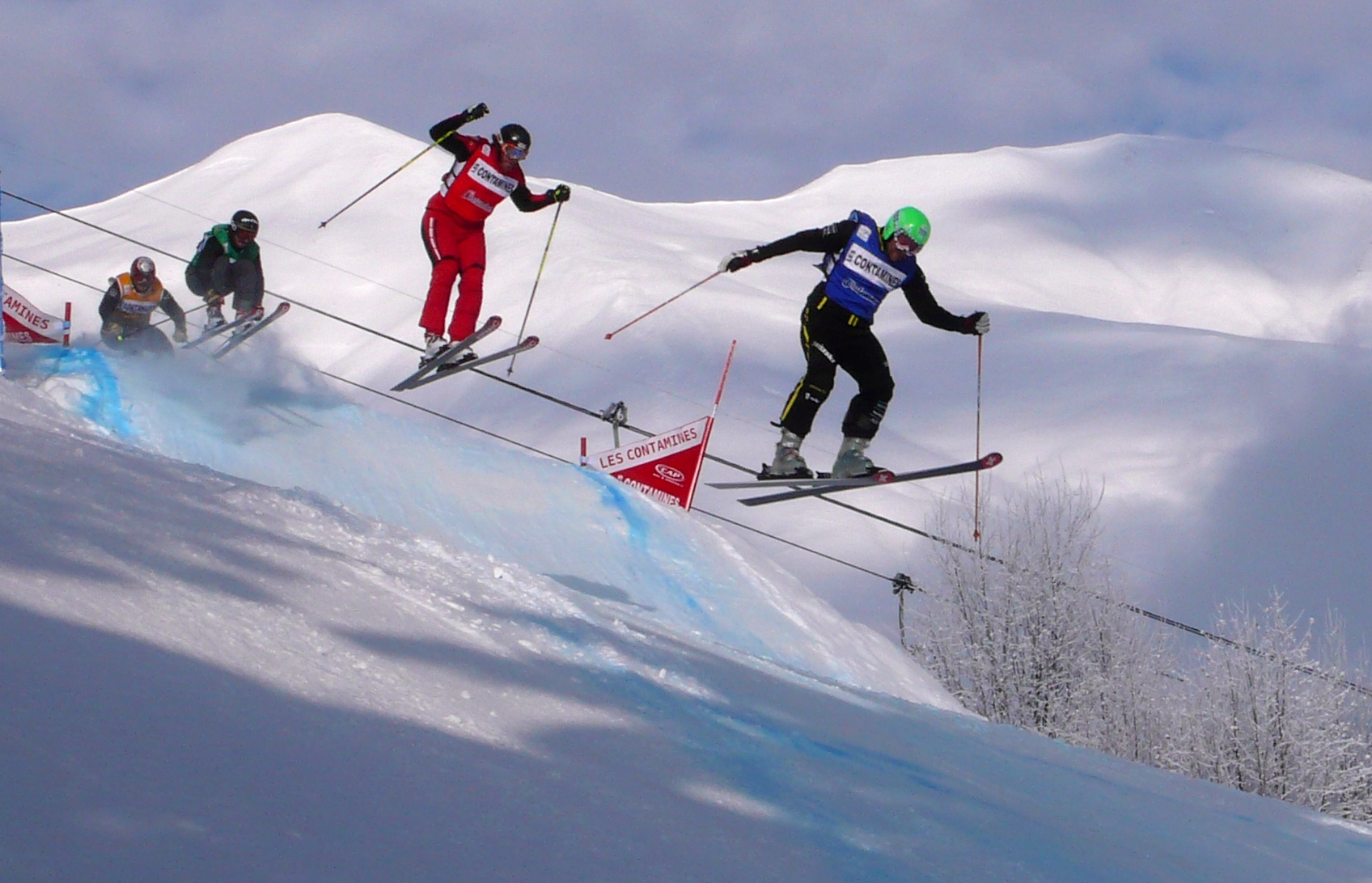

Personal information
- Born: May 3, 1978 (age 48) Davos, Switzerland

Sport
- Sport: Skiing
- Updated on March 28, 2013

Beni Hofer (born May 3, 1978 in Zweisimmen) is a Swiss freestyle skier, specializing in ski cross and a former alpine skier.

Hofer competed at the 2010 Winter Olympics for Switzerland. He placed 27th in the qualifying round in ski cross, to advance to the knockout stages. He advanced from the first round by finishing second in his heat, but finished 4th in his quarterfinal, failing to advance to the semifinals.

As of March 2013, his best showing at the World Championships is 10th, in 2005.

Hofer made his World Cup debut in January 2008. His best World Cup overall finish in ski cross is 13th, in 2004/05.
