= Stanislav Kravchuk =

Ukrainian freestyle skier

Personal information
- Born: 25 September 1978 (age 47) Chirchiq, Uzbek SSR, Soviet Union

Sport
- Sport: Skiing

World Cup career
- Indiv. podiums: 12
- Indiv. wins: 2
- Updated on 28 March 2013

Stanislav Kravchuk (Ukrainian: Станіслав Михайлович Кравчук; born 25 September 1978 in Chirchiq) is an Uzbek-born Ukrainian freestyle skier, specializing in aerials.

== Career ==
Kravchuk competed at the 1998, 2002, 2006 and 2010 Winter Olympics for Ukraine. In 1998, he qualified for the aerials final, ending up 9th. In 2002, he again qualified for the final, finishing 5th. In 2006, he placed 13th in the qualifying round, failing to advance to the final. In 2010, he placed 19th in the qualifying round of the aerials event, again failing to advance to the final.

As of March 2013, his best showing at the World Championships is 5th, in 2003.

Kravchuk made his World Cup debut in March 1997. As of March 2013, he has won two World Cup events and finished on the podium twelve times. His two wins came in 2007/08 in Deer Valley and 2011/12 in Minsk. His best World Cup overall finish in aerials is 4th, in 2007/08.

== World Cup podiums ==
| Date | Location | Rank | Event |
| 5 December 2003 | Ruka | 3rd place, bronze medalist(s) | Aerials |
| 21 January 2005 | Fernie | 2nd place, silver medalist(s) | Aerials |
| 19 February 2005 | Sauze d'Oulx | 3rd place, bronze medalist(s) | Aerials |
| 12 January 2007 | Deer Valley | 3rd place, bronze medalist(s) | Aerials |
| 1 February 2008 | Deer Valley | 1st place, gold medalist(s) | Aerials |
| 3 January 2008 | Moscow | 2nd place, silver medalist(s) | Aerials |
| 6 February 2009 | Cypress Mountain | 3rd place, bronze medalist(s) | Aerials |
| 14 February 2009 | Moscow | 3rd place, bronze medalist(s) | Aerials |
| 16 January 2011 | Mont Gabriel | 3rd place, bronze medalist(s) | Aerials |
| 12 February 2011 | Moscow | 2nd place, silver medalist(s) | Aerials |
| 19 February 2011 | Minsk | 2nd place, silver medalist(s) | Aerials |
| 25 February 2012 | Minsk | 1st place, gold medalist(s) | Aerials |
