= Franck Piccard =

French alpine skier (born 1965)

Personal information
- Born: 17 September 1964 (age 61) Albertville, France
- Height: 1.82 m (6 ft 0 in)
- Weight: 70 kg (154 lb)

Sport
- Sport: alpine skiing
- Club: Les Saisies
Medal record
Representing France
Olympic Games
Gold medal – first place	1988 Calgary	Super-G
Silver medal – second place	1992 Albertville	Downhill
Bronze medal – third place	1988 Calgary	Downhill

Franck Piccard (born 17 September 1964) is a French former Alpine skier. A native of Les Saisies, Piccard won a total of four Alpine Skiing World Cup races. At the 1988 Olympics in Calgary he won a gold medal in the Super-G competition (the first winter Olympic gold-medal for a French athlete since ski racer Jean-Claude Killy in 1968, who became a three-times gold-medallist) and a bronze medal in the downhill. At the 1992 Olympics in Albertville he won a silver medal in the downhill. He also could achieve a bronze-medal in the Super-G-Race at the FIS Alpine Skiing World Championships 1991.

First excellent success was winning a gold-medal in the downhill race in the FIS Alpine skiing Junior World Championships 1982 at Auron. First "World Cup Points", he could catch on 10 December 1983, placed 4th in the Super-G at Val-d’Isère, first win was in the Super-G on 23 March 1988 at Beaver Creek. At the beginning of his skiing career, he did prefer starting in Downhill and Super-G races, later he changed to the giant slalom. Last World Cup race was on 10 February 1996 in the giant slalom at Hinterstoder; he was placed 27th (therefore one place - and 0.38 sec. - behind Hermann Maier at his debut in World Cup Races). Afterwards, he did start in so-called FIS-races and in the French Championships, until the year 2000. He could achieve a three-times French Champion (1985 till 1993).

Other results in the FIS Alpine Skiing World Championships:

Bormio 1985: Alpine Combined 6th; Downhill 15th.
Crans-Montana 1987: Super-G 10th; Alpine Combined 10th.
Vail 1989: Super-G 10th.
Saalbach-Hinterglemm 1991: Super-G 3rd; Giant slalom 13th; Downhill 15th.
Sierra Nevada 1996: Giant slalom 15h.
In the giant slalom at Morioka in 1993 he didn't finish the first run, held on 9 February.

After retiring from downhill skiing, Piccard competed in long-distance cross-country skiing at the national level in 2006–2009. In 1988, he was awarded the Prix de la ville de Paris by the French Academy of Sports.

His father gave him the name Franck in tribute to Frank Sinatra. Piccard's siblings Leila Piccard, Ian Piccard and Jeff Piccard also competed as alpine skiers, as does his daughter Lucie. Another brother, Ted Piccard, has competed in both alpine skiing and skiercross.

== World Cup victories ==
Date	Location	Race
13 March 1988	(United States) Beaver Creek	Super-G
11 January 1990	(Austria) Schladming	Downhill
2 December 1990	(France) Valloire	Super-G
30 October 1993	(Austria) Sölden	Giant slalom
