= Ian Piccard =

French alpine skier (born 1968)

Ian Piccard (born 11 March 1968) is a French former alpine skier who competed in the 1994 Winter Olympics and 1998 Winter Olympics.

He is the brother of fellow skiers Franck Piccard, Leila Piccard, Ted Piccard and Jeff Piccard.
