= Leila Piccard =

French alpine skier (born 1971)

Leila Piccard (born 11 January 1971) is a French former alpine skier who competed in the 1994 Winter Olympics and 1998 Winter Olympics. She took a bronze medal in the giant slalom in the 1997 Alpine Skiing World Championships and scored one World Cup win, in a parallel slalom event in Tignes in October 1997.

Leila was named after the Eric Clapton song "Layla". She is the sister of fellow skiers Franck Piccard, Ian Piccard, Ted Piccard and Jeff Piccard.
