= Eric Iljans =

Swedish freestyle skier

Eric Iljans (born 1969) is a Swedish freestyle skier. He represented Sweden at the 2010 Winter Olympics in Vancouver, where he competed in ski cross.

He is married to Magdalena Iljans.
