= Errol Kerr =

American-Jamaican freestyle skier, construction executive, and ski instructor

Errol Kerr (born April 12, 1986, in Brooklyn, New York) is an American-Jamaican skicross racer, construction executive, and ski instructor based in Truckee, California. Formerly with the U.S. Ski Team, Kerr represented Jamaica at the 2010 Winter Olympics in Vancouver, finishing ninth in the skicross event — the best placing by a Caribbean athlete at any Winter Olympics. Kerr is the son of a Jamaican father and an American mother. He started skiing at age four and began racing competitively at age 11. Kerr cross-trained in BMX and motocross before finding his niche in skicross.

== Skiing career ==
Kerr made his World Cup debut in January 2008 with a twelfth-place finish in Les Contamines and followed up with an eighth-place finish in Meiringen-Hasliberg in March. He opened the 2008–09 season with a thirtieth place in St. Johann in Tirol and a fifteenth place in Lake Placid, and then finished tenth at the Skicross World Championships 2009 in Japan.

At the 2010 Winter Olympics, Kerr served as flag bearer for Jamaica during the opening ceremony and finished ninth overall in the skicross event, the best result by a Caribbean athlete at any Winter Olympics. Kerr also finished fifth in Skier X at Winter X Games XV.

Kerr continues to work as a ski instructor at Palisades Tahoe (formerly Squaw Valley) in the Lake Tahoe area during the winter season.

== Post-skiing career ==
=== Aerial cinematography ===
After his competitive skiing career, Kerr co-founded Copter Kids LLC, an aerial cinematography company based in the Reno–Tahoe area. Kerr served as the aerial cinematographer, operating cameras from helicopters, while pilot Trent Palmer handled the flying. The company's work included projects featured on the Outdoor Channel and various action sports productions. Kerr's cinematography credits are listed on the Internet Movie Database.

=== Construction and excavation ===
Kerr is the Excavation Foreman of Ruppert Inc., a commercial excavation and GPS machine control company operating in the Truckee–Lake Tahoe region. The company specializes in excavation, grading, GPS machine control technology, and commercial snow removal. Kerr also operates E Kerr LLC, his own excavation business.

== Personal life ==
Kerr resides in Truckee, California. He continues to ski instruct at Palisades Tahoe during the winter months while running his construction businesses year-round.

Olympic Games
Preceded by Veronica Campbell-Brown	Flag bearer for Jamaica; Vancouver 2010	Succeeded by Usain Bolt
