= Tommy Eliasson =

Swedish freestyle skier (born 1980)

Personal information
- Born: 28 February 1980 (age 46) Boden, Sweden

Sport
- Sport: Skiing

World Cup career
- Indiv. podiums: 1
- Updated on 28 March 2013

Tommy Eliasson (born 28 February 1980 in Boden, Sweden) is a Swedish freestyle skier, specializing in ski cross.

Eliasson competed at the 2010 Winter Olympics for Sweden. He placed 23rd in the qualifying round in ski cross, to advance to the knockout stages. He advanced from the first round by finishing second in his heat, but finished 3rd in the quarterfinals, failing to advance to the semifinals.

As of March 2013, his best showing at the World Championships is 4th, in 2005.

Eliasson made his World Cup debut in January 2009. As of March 2013, he has one World Cup podium finish, a bronze at St. Johann in Tirol in 2008/09. His best World Cup overall finish in ski cross is 9th, in 2004/05.

== World Cup podiums ==
Date	Location	Rank	Event
5 January 2009	St. Johann in Tirol	3rd place, bronze medalist(s)	Ski cross
