= Frida Svedin Thunström =

Swedish ice hockey player

- Born: November 4, 1989 (age 35); Timrå, Sweden
- Height: 5 ft 7 in (170 cm)
- Weight: 160 lb (73 kg; 11 st 6 lb)
- Position: Forward
- Shoots: Left
- National team: Sweden
- Playing career: 2009–present

Frida Anna Linnéa Svedin Thunström (born 4 November 1989 in Timrå, Sweden) is a Swedish ice hockey forward.

== International career ==
Svedin Thunström was selected for the Sweden women's national ice hockey team in the 2010 Winter Olympics. She played in all five games, recording one assist.

Svedin Thunström has also appeared for Sweden at the IIHF Women's World Championships. Her only appearance to date came in 2009.

== Career statistics ==
=== International career ===
| Year | Team | Event | GP | G | A | Pts | PIM |
|---|---|---|---|---|---|---|---|
| 2009 | Sweden | WW | 5 | 1 | 2 | 3 | 2 |
| 2010 | Sweden | Oly | 5 | 0 | 1 | 1 | 6 |
