= Marte Gjefsen =

Norwegian freestyle skier (born 1989)

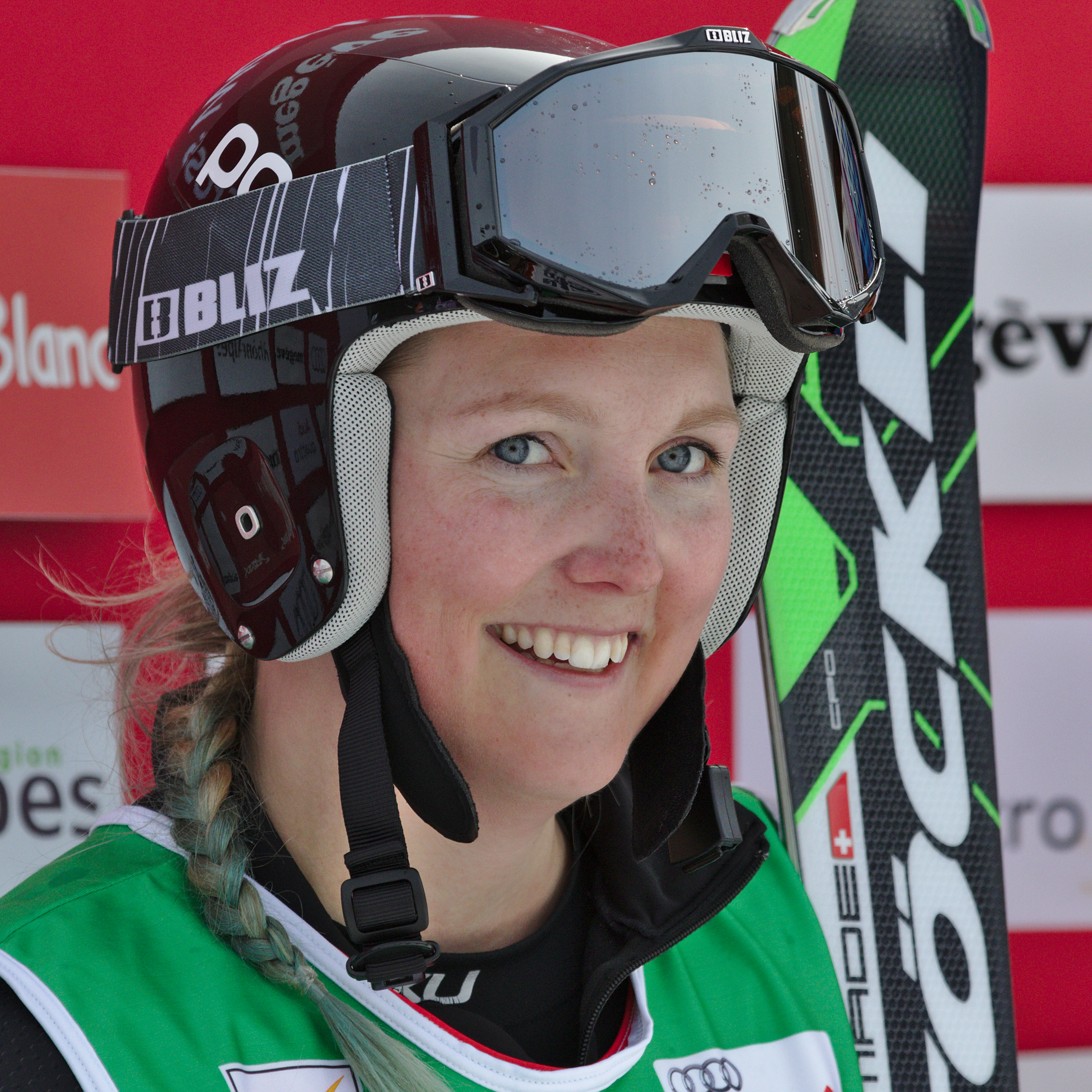

Personal information
- Born: Marte Høie Gjefsen; 6 March 1989 (age 37) Lillehammer, Norway
- Height: 169 cm (5 ft 7 in) (2014)

Sport
- Country: Norway
- Sport: Freestyle skicross
Medal record
Women's freestyle skiing
Representing Norway
X Games
Gold medal – first place	2012 Aspen	Skier X

Marte Høie Gjefsen (born 6 March 1989) is a Norwegian freestyle skier. She represented Norway at the 2010 Winter Olympics in Vancouver. Gjefsen placed first in the World Cup competition in ski cross in Canada 20 January 2010. She won the gold medal in Women's Skier X at the 2012 Winter X Games in Aspen, Colorado.
