= Juha Haukkala =

Finnish freestyle skier

Juha Haukkala (born 28 June 1978) is a Finnish freestyle skier who specializes in the skicross discipline.

He made his World Cup debut in February 2003 in Les Contamines, and collected his first World Cup points in January 2004, with a 25th place in Laax and a 22nd place in Spindleruv Mlyn. The next year he won a gold medal at the 2005 Winter Universiade and finished seventh at the 2005 World Championships. He placed among the top World Cup twenty for the first time in January 2006, with a fifteenth place in Les Contamines, and successively improved to fourteenth and eleventh before the season was over. He continued with decent placements in 2007, 2008 and 2009, with a fifth place from January 2008 in Kreischberg as his best result. He finished eleventh at the 2007 World Championships.

He was born in Seinäjoki, but resides in Helsinki where he works as a radiologist. He represents the sports club Seinäjoen Hiihtoseura.
