= Audun Grønvold =

Norwegian freestyle skier (1976–2025)

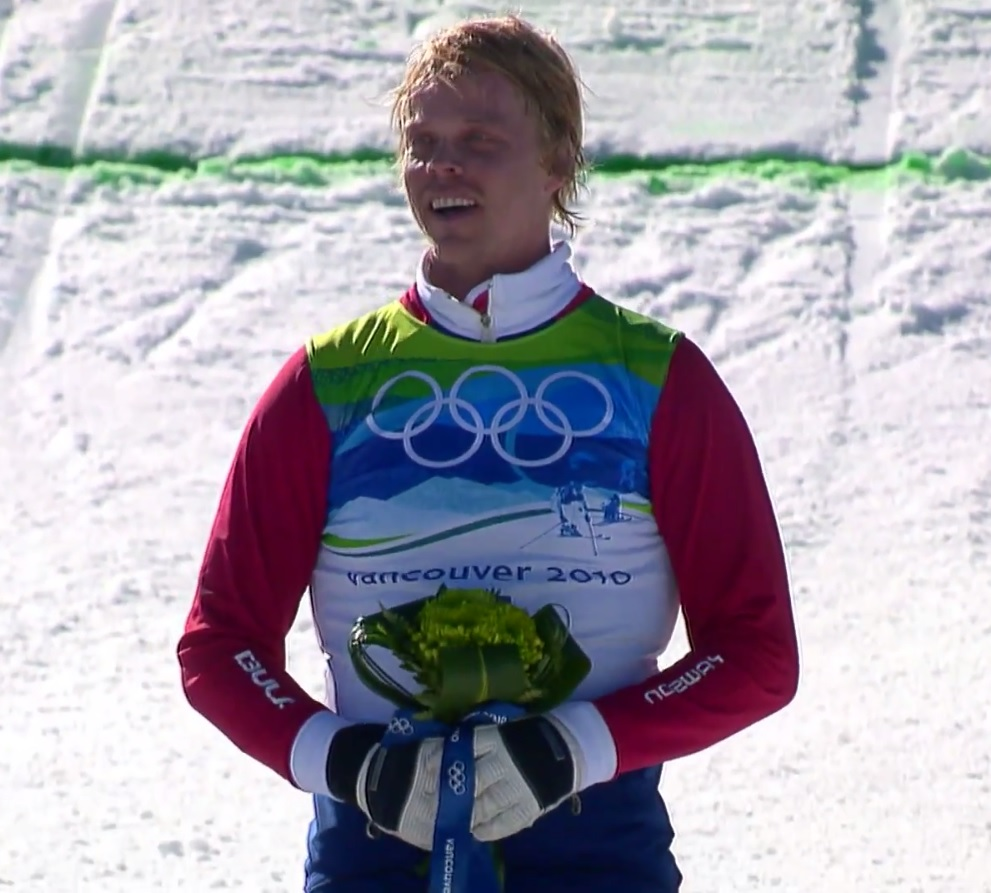
- Grønvold in 2010

Personal information
- Born: 28 February 1976 Hamar, Norway
- Died: 15 July 2025 (aged 49) Norway

Sport
- Country: Norway
- Sport: Alpine skiing Freestyle skiing
- Club: Vang Skiløperforening
Medal record
Representing Norway
Men's freestyle skiing
Olympic Games
Bronze medal – third place	2010 Vancouver	Ski cross
FIS Freestyle World Ski Championships
Bronze medal – third place	2005 Ruka	Ski cross

Audun Grønvold (28 February 1976 – 15 July 2025) was a Norwegian alpine and freestyle skier, born in Hamar.

He won national titles in both downhill and ski cross. Internationally, he won bronze medals in ski cross both at the Olympics and at the world championships. After his active career he coached the Norwegian national ski cross team.

== Career ==
Grønvold won a bronze medal in ski cross at the FIS Freestyle World Ski Championships 2005. He won the Ski Cross World Cup in 2007. He represented Norway at the 2010 Winter Olympics in Vancouver, where he won a bronze medal in the men's ski cross. A third place in downhill was his best World Cup achievement.

Grønvold won national titles in both alpine skiing (downhill) and freestyle skiing (ski cross), winning the Norwegian championship in downhill in 2003 and 2004, and becoming Norwegian champion in ski cross in 2005 and 2006. He won another national title in ski cross in 2010, which also earned him the Kongepokal trophy.

Grønvold retired as active athlete in 2010, due to injury problems. After his active career, he was assigned as coach for the Norwegian national ski cross team from 2010 to 2012. He later established the company Grønvold Sports for selling sports equipment, and worked as a media consultant for Egmont Publishing.

== Death ==
Grønvold died aged 49, on 15 July 2025, after being struck by lightning several days earlier, on 12 July, whilst on a cabin trip. He was survived by his wife and three children.
