= Saša Farič =

Slovenian freestyle skier (born 1984)

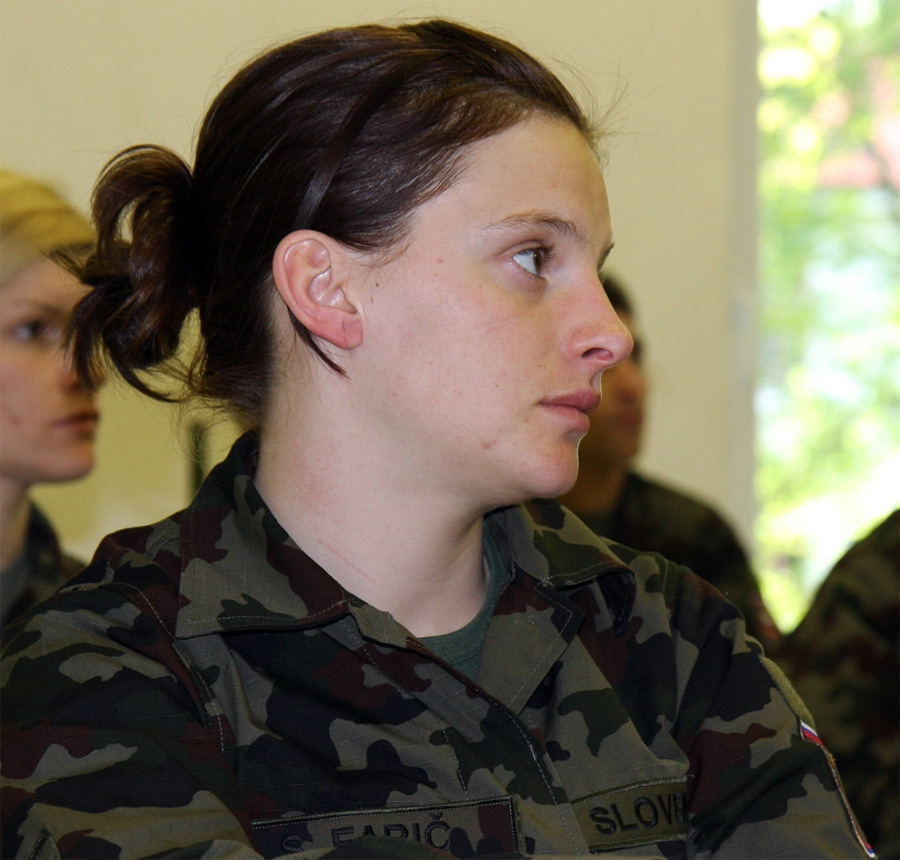

Personal information
- Born: July 19, 1984 (age 42) Radomlje, SFR Yugoslavia

Sport
- Sport: Skiing

World Cup career
- Indiv. podiums: 5
- Indiv. wins: 2
- Updated on July 31, 2013

Saša Farič (born July 19, 1984 in Radomlje) is a Slovenian freestyle skier, specializing in ski cross and a former alpine skier.

Farič competed at the 2010 Winter Olympics for Slovenia. She placed 16th in the qualifying round in ski cross, to advance to the knockout stages. She finished second in her first round heat to advance to the quarterfinals. In that race, she finished in fourth, failing to advance.

As of April 2013, her best finish at the World Championships is 4th, in 2009.

Faric made her World Cup debut in November 2003. As of April 2013, she has two World Cup victories, the first coming in that debut race at Saas-Fee in 2003/04. She also has three other World Cup podium finishes. Her best World Cup overall finish in ski cross is 2nd, in 2007/08.

== World Cup podiums ==
| Date | Location | Rank | Event |
| 23 November 2003 | Saas-Fee | 1st place, gold medalist(s) | Ski cross |
| 2 February 2008 | Deer Valley | 2nd place, silver medalist(s) | Ski cross |
| 6 March 2008 | Grindelwald | 1st place, gold medalist(s) | Ski cross |
| 9 March 2008 | Meiringen-Hasliberg | 2nd place, silver medalist(s) | Ski cross |
| 20 January 2010 | Blue Mountain | 3rd place, bronze medalist(s) | Ski cross |
