= Ted Piccard =

French freestyle skier (born 1978)

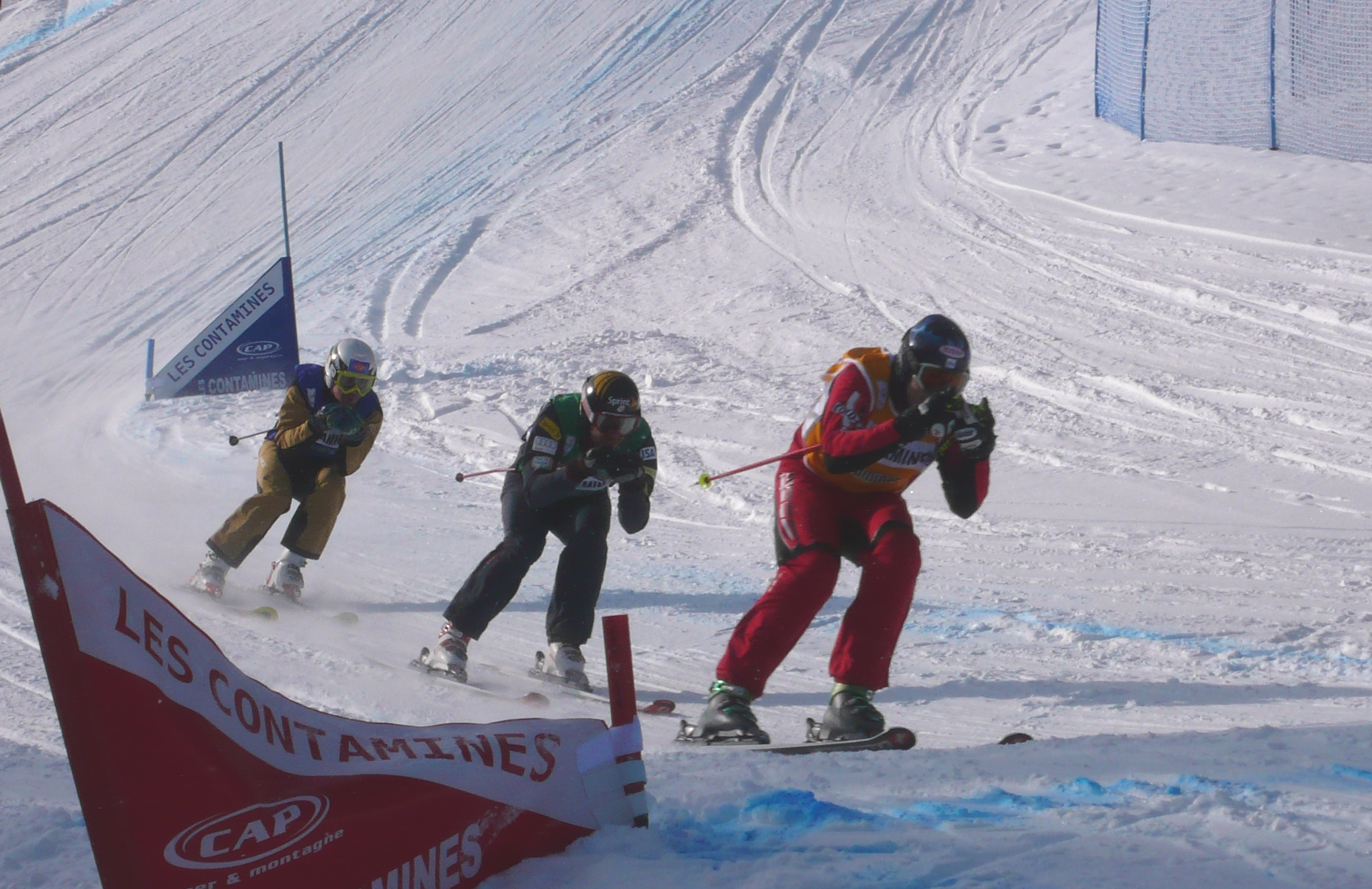

Personal information
- Born: November 30, 1978 (age 47) Albertville, France

Sport
- Sport: Skiing

World Cup career
- Indiv. podiums: 1
- Updated on March 31, 2013

Ted Piccard (born November 30, 1978, in Albertville) is a French freestyle skier, specializing in ski cross and a former alpine skier.

Piccard competed at the 2010 Winter Olympics for France. He placed 16th in the qualifying round in ski cross, to advance to the knockout stages. In the first round, he failed to finish, and did not advance.

As of March 2013, his best showing at the World Championships is 29th, in 2009.

Piccard made his World Cup debut in January 2005. As of March 2013, he has one World Cup podium finish, winning a bronze in 2009–10 at Alpe d'Huez. His best World Cup overall finish in aerials is 7th, in 2011–12.

He was named after US Senator Ted Kennedy. He is the brother of fellow skiers Franck Piccard, Leila Piccard, Ian Piccard and Jeff Piccard.

== World Cup podiums ==
Date	Location	Rank	Event
13 January 2010	Alpe d'Huez	2nd place, silver medalist(s)	Ski cross
