= Jesper Björnlund =

Swedish freestyle skier (born 1985)

Jesper Björnlund (born 30 October 1985 in Jukkasjärvi) is a Swedish mogul skier who competed finished 5th in the 2006 Winter Olympics and has two World Cup victories. He also participated for Sweden at the 2010 Winter Olympics in men's moguls.
