= Xinjiang Xinxin Mining Industry Company =

Chinese mining company

Xinjiang Xinxin Mining 新疆新鑫矿业
- Company type: State-owned enterprise
- Industry: Mining
- Founded: 2005
- Headquarters: Fuyun County, Xinjiang, People's Republic of China
- Area served: China and abroad
- Key people: Chairman: Yuan Ze
- Products: Nickel, Copper, Lithium, Beryllium, Tantalum, Niobium, Gold, Cobalt, Silver, Platinum, Palladium
- Website: Xinjiang Xinxin Mining

Xinjiang Xinxin Mining Industry Company Limited (SEHK: 3833), commonly referred to as Xinxin Mining, is a major Chinese non-ferrous metals mining company headquartered in Fuyun County, Altay Prefecture, Xinjiang. The company is the second largest producer of electrolytic nickel in Mainland China and one of the few Chinese companies with integrated mining, smelting, and refining capabilities for a wide range of strategic and rare metals.

== History ==
Established in 2005, the company holds 30-year mining rights over several key deposits of nickel and copper in Fuyun County, a region rich in non-ferrous mineral resources. In addition to nickel and copper, the company extracts and processes cobalt, lithium, beryllium, tantalum, niobium, and various noble metals such as platinum and palladium.

Xinxin Mining was listed on the Hong Kong Stock Exchange on 12 October 2007 as an H-share company.

== Operations ==
The company's main mining and processing facilities are located in the Kalatongke Mine zone in Fuyun, Xinjiang. It operates both underground and open-pit mines and has invested in modernization of its smelting and refining infrastructure to improve efficiency and environmental compliance.

As of 2022, the company reported proven and probable reserves of over 500,000 tonnes of nickel and significant quantities of copper and cobalt.
