= Anders Rekdal =

Norwegian freestyle skier

Personal information
- Nationality: Norwegian
- Born: 4 January 1987 (age 39)

Sport
- Country: Norway
- Sport: Freestyle skiing
Medal record
Men's freestyle skiing
Representing Norway
Junior World Championships
| Silver medal – second place | 2006 Krasnoe Ozero | Ski cross |

Anders Rekdal (born 4 January 1987) is a Norwegian freestyle skier. He represented Norway at the 2010 Winter Olympics in Vancouver.
