= Xavier Kuhn =

French freestyle skier (born 1978)

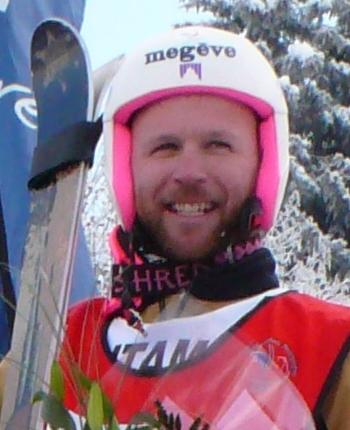

Personal information
- Nationality: French
- Born: 1978 (age 46–47)

Sport
- Sport: Freestyle skiing

Xavier Kuhn (born 1978) is a French freestyle skier. He represents France at the 2010 Winter Olympics in Vancouver.
