= Scott Kneller =

Australian freestyle skier (born 1989)

Personal information
- Nationality: Australian
- Born: 19 May 1989 (age 37) Cooma, New South Wales, Australia
- Height: 180 cm (5 ft 11 in) (2014)
- Weight: 90 kg (198 lb) (2014)
- Spouse: Regina Kneller (m.2019)

Sport
- Country: Australia
- Sport: Freestyle Skiing
- Event: Ski Cross Men

Achievements and titles
- Olympic finals: 2010 Winter Olympics (Vancouver), 2014 Winter Olympics (Australia)
Medal record
New Zealand Winter Games
Gold medal – first place	2011 Cardrona	Ski Cross
- Updated on 26 January 2019

Scott Kneller (born 1989) in central Australia. He is an Australian freestyle skier. He represented Australia at the 2010 Winter Olympics in Vancouver. Competing in the ski cross, he came seventh. He came second in his 1/8 final, and then in his 1/4 final to qualify for the semifinals. In each race there are four competitors and the top two progress. He then came third in the semi-final and third in the Small Final, for those eliminated in the semifinals. He competed for Australia at the 2014 Winter Olympics in the ski cross events.

Kneller completed high school at Hurlstone Agricultural High School in southern Sydney in 2007 and studied a combined Bachelor of Commerce/Bachelor of Engineering at the University of New South Wales from 2009-2015.
