= Patrick Koller =

Austrian freestyle skier

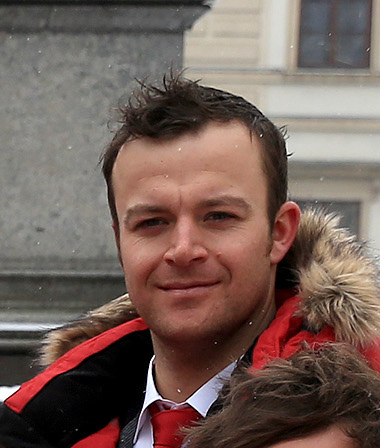
Patrick Koller

Patrick Koller (born 16 October 1983) is an Austrian freestyle skier who specializes in the ski cross discipline.

He made his World Cup debut in February 2007 in Les Contamines, with a 30th place, and finished among the top twenty for the first time one year later, with a 20th place in Flaine. In the last World Cup event of the 2007–08 season he finished tenth in Meiringen-Hasliberg. In January 2009 he took his first podium as he finished second in Lake Placid.

He represents the sports club WSV Söll.
