= Conradign Netzer =

Swiss freestyle skier

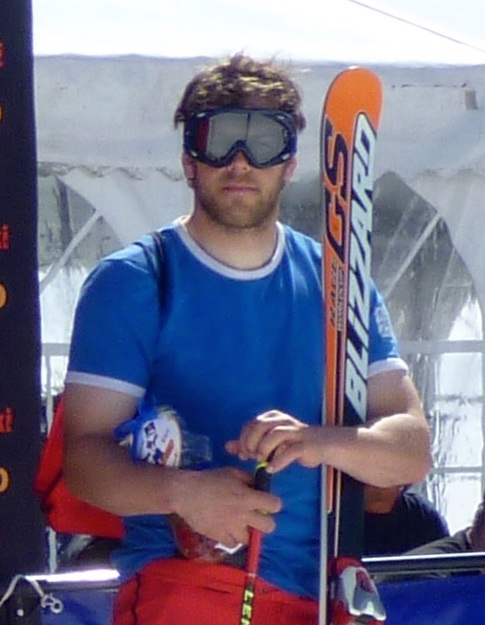
Swiss skicrosser Conradign Netzer 2011 in Arosa/Switzerland.

Conradign Netzer (born 2 August 1980) is a Swiss freestyle skier who specializes in the skicross discipline.

He made his World Cup debut in November 2003 in Saas-Fee, and collected his first World Cup points with a sixteenth place in January 2004 in Laax. He equalled this place in two World Cup races, in January 2005 and January 2006 respectively, and also finished fourteenth at the 2005 World Championships. In the 2008–09 season he opened with a 26th place, and followed with fourteenth, sixteenth and nineteenth places before recording his best World Cup result at the time, a fifth place in Valmalenco in March.

In the next season he reached the world cup podium for the first time in his career, with a third place at Innichen.

The best form of his career came at the end of the 2010–11 season. He achieved third place in the event at Branas and then a career-best second place in the event at Myrkdalen-Voss. In the same year he finished sixth at the 2011 World Championships. He is also the current Swiss National Champion having won the title in Arosa.

He represents the sports club SV Andeer.

Netzer will be the head coach of the High Performance Centre New Zealand's (HPCNZ) Men's Team this Southern hemisphere winter season at Cardrona Alpine Resort in Wānaka.
