= Michael Schmid (skier) =

Swiss freestyle skier

Medal record

Men's freestyle skiing

Representing Switzerland

Olympic Games
Gold medal – first place	2010 Vancouver	Ski cross

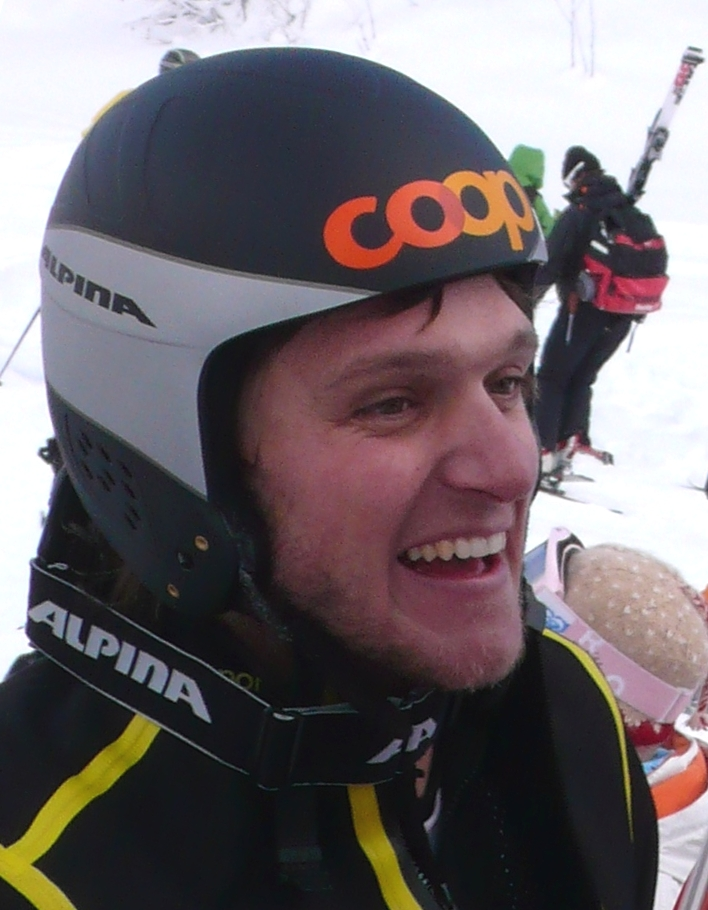
Michael Schmid

Michael ("Mike") Schmid (born 18 March 1984) is a Swiss freestyle skier who specializes in the ski cross discipline. He is the inaugural Olympic champion in the event.

He made his World Cup debut in January 2004 in Laax, and finished among the top thirty for the first time one year later, with a 22nd place in Pozza di Fassa. Then, two tenth places and a thirteenth place followed before the end of the season. He also finished sixth at the 2005 World Championships in Ruka. In the 2005–06 season he finished eighth three times, and took his first podium with a second place in Kreischberg in January. In the seasons 2006–07 and 2007–08 he finished consistently among the top ten in the World Cup, recording one more second place, and finished tenth at the 2007 World Championships in Madonna di Campiglio. In January 2009, he won a World Cup race for the first time, in St. Johann in Tirol.

Schmid won the gold medal at the 2010 Winter Olympics, after achieving the best time in qualification and dominating all four final runs.

He represents the sports club SK Frutigen. He uses Stöckli skis.
