= Lars Lewén =

Swedish freestyle skier (born 1975)

Personal information
- Born: 7 October 1975 (age 50) Stockholm, Sweden

Sport
- Sport: Skiing

World Cup career
- Indiv. podiums: 10
- Indiv. wins: 5
- Updated on 28 March 2013

Lars Lewén (born 7 October 1975 in Stockholm) is a Swedish freestyle skier, specializing in ski cross and a former alpine skier.

Lewén competed at the 2010 Winter Olympics for Sweden. He placed 19th in the qualifying round in ski cross, to advance to the knockout stages. In the first round, he finished fourth in his heat, and did not advance.

As of March 2013, his best showing at the World Championships is fifth, in 2005 and 2007.

Lewén made his World Cup debut in November 2002. As of March 2013, he has ten World Cup podiums and five victories, with the first coming in 2007/08 at Grindelwald. His best World Cup overall finish in ski cross is second, in 2007/08.

== World Cup podiums ==
Date	Location	Rank	Event
23 November 2003	Saas-Fee	3rd place, bronze medalist(s)	Ski cross
12 March 2004	Sauze d'Oulx	3rd place, bronze medalist(s)	Ski cross
10 February 2005	Naeba	3rd place, bronze medalist(s)	Ski cross
6 March 2008	Grindelwald	1st place, gold medalist(s)	Ski cross
9 March 2008	Meiringen-Hasliberg	1st place, gold medalist(s)	Ski cross
16 March 2008	Valmalenco	1st place, gold medalist(s)	Ski cross
19 January 2009	Lake Placid	1st place, gold medalist(s)	Ski cross
24 February 2009	Branas	1st place, gold medalist(s)	Ski cross
20 January 2010	Blue Mountain	2nd place, silver medalist(s)	Ski cross
11 January 2012	Alpe d'Huez	3rd place, bronze medalist(s)	Ski cross
