= Simon Stickl =

German freestyle skier

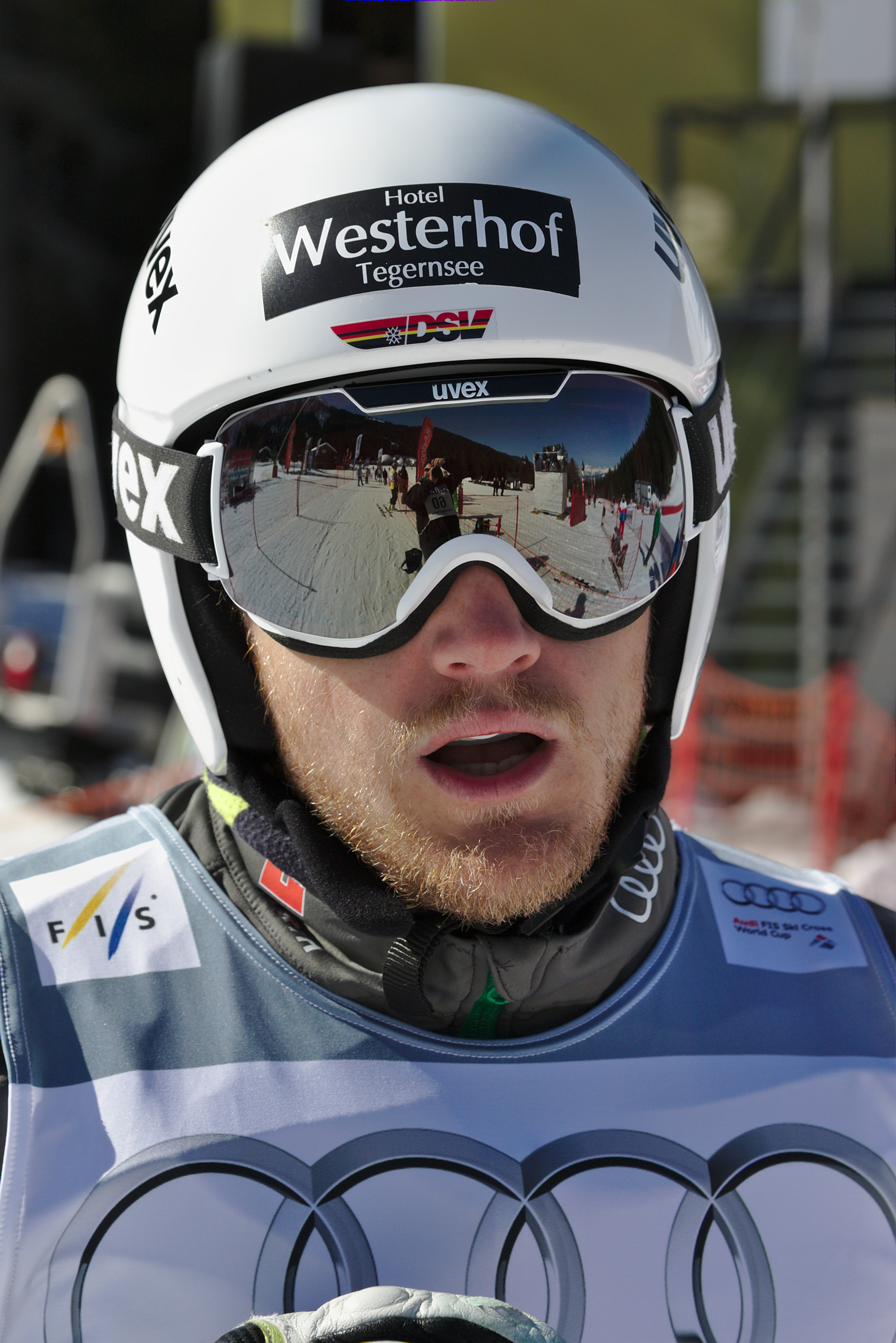

Simon Stickl (born 18 October 1987) is a German freestyle skier who specializes in the skicross discipline.

He made his World Cup debut in January 2008 in Les Contamines, and collected his first World Cup points four days later with a nineteenth place in Flaine. He then recorded a thirteenth place in Kreischberg before dropping slightly through the remainder of the 2007–08 season. He opened the 2008–09 season with a 21st place in St. Johann in Tirol.

He represents the sports club SC Bad Wiessee.
