= United States at the 2010 Winter Olympics =

- Flag of the United States
- IOC code: USA
- NOC: United States Olympic Committee

in Vancouver
- Competitors: 212 (120 men and 92 women) in 8 sports
- Flag bearers: Mark Grimmette (opening ceremony); Bill Demong (closing ceremony)
- Medals Ranked 3rd: Gold 9 Silver 15 Bronze 13 Total 37

Winter Olympics appearances (overview)
- 1924; 1928; 1932; 1936; 1948; 1952; 1956; 1960; 1964; 1968; 1972; 1976; 1980; 1984; 1988; 1992; 1994; 1998; 2002; 2006; 2010; 2014; 2018; 2022; 2026

The United States participated in the 2010 Winter Olympics in Vancouver, British Columbia, Canada. The U.S. team had a historic Winter Games, winning an unprecedented 37 medals. Team USA's medal haul, which included nine gold, marked the first time since the 1932 Lake Placid Games that the U.S. earned more medals than any other participant.

The U.S. alpine ski team rebounded from a disappointing showing in 2006 by having its most successful Olympic performance ever, gathering a total of eight medals. Lindsey Vonn became the first American woman to win gold in the downhill event; while Bode Miller became the most successful U.S. alpine skier in history after winning gold in the super combined as well as two other medals. Medal winning performances by Julia Mancuso and Andrew Weibrecht contributed to the team's success.

In Nordic combined, the U.S. team ended an 86-year drought during which the United States had not earned a single medal in the sport. Bill Demong won gold in the individual large hill/10 km, and Johnny Spillane won silver in both the individual normal hill/10 km and the individual large hill/10 km. Demong, Spillane, Todd Lodwick and Brett Camerota also won silver in the team event.

Short track speed skater Apolo Ohno surpassed Bonnie Blair as the most decorated American Winter Olympic athlete in history with a total of eight medals in his Olympic career. Ohno gave the US relay team the final push for the bronze in the 5000 meter relay, and earned silver and bronze medals in the 1500 and 1000 meter individual events respectively. Women's 1000 meter silver medalist Katherine Reutter broke a streak dating back to 1994 in which no American woman had medaled in an individual short track event.

Long track speed skater Shani Davis became the first man to win back-to-back gold in the 1000 meter event. Davis also earned a silver medal at 1500 meters, duplicating his Olympic results from four years earlier.

Figure skater Evan Lysacek became the first American man to win the Olympic men's figure skating title since Brian Boitano in 1988 at Calgary. Lysacek is also the first non-Russian or Unified Team skater to win the men's title since Boitano. Ice dancers Meryl Davis and Charlie White won only the second silver medal in that discipline for the United States.

The U.S. snowboard team also enjoyed success, garnering five medals overall. Shaun White defended his gold medal in men's halfpipe, as did Seth Wescott in men's snowboard cross. Hannah Teter and Kelly Clark won silver and bronze in women's halfpipe.

The USA-1 four-man bobsled team, nicknamed "Night Train" and led by pilot Steve Holcomb, delivered the United States' first gold medal in the event since the St. Moritz Games in 1948. Holcomb's driving was described as "super-genius" by Kevin Kuske of the silver medal winning German team. Brakeman Curtis Tomasevicz and pushers Steve Mesler and Justin Olsen rounded out the gold medal crew.

The United States finished the 2010 Olympic Games by setting a new record for the most medals won by a single country at a Winter Olympics. The previous record of 36 was set by Germany at the 2002 Winter Olympics; with the silver medal won by the men's hockey team in the final Olympic event of 2010, the U.S. earned their 37th medal of the Vancouver Games. In addition, the U.S. team set a Winter Games record for bronze medals with 13, and the 15 silver medals by the U.S. was second only to the record of 16 set by Germany in 2002.

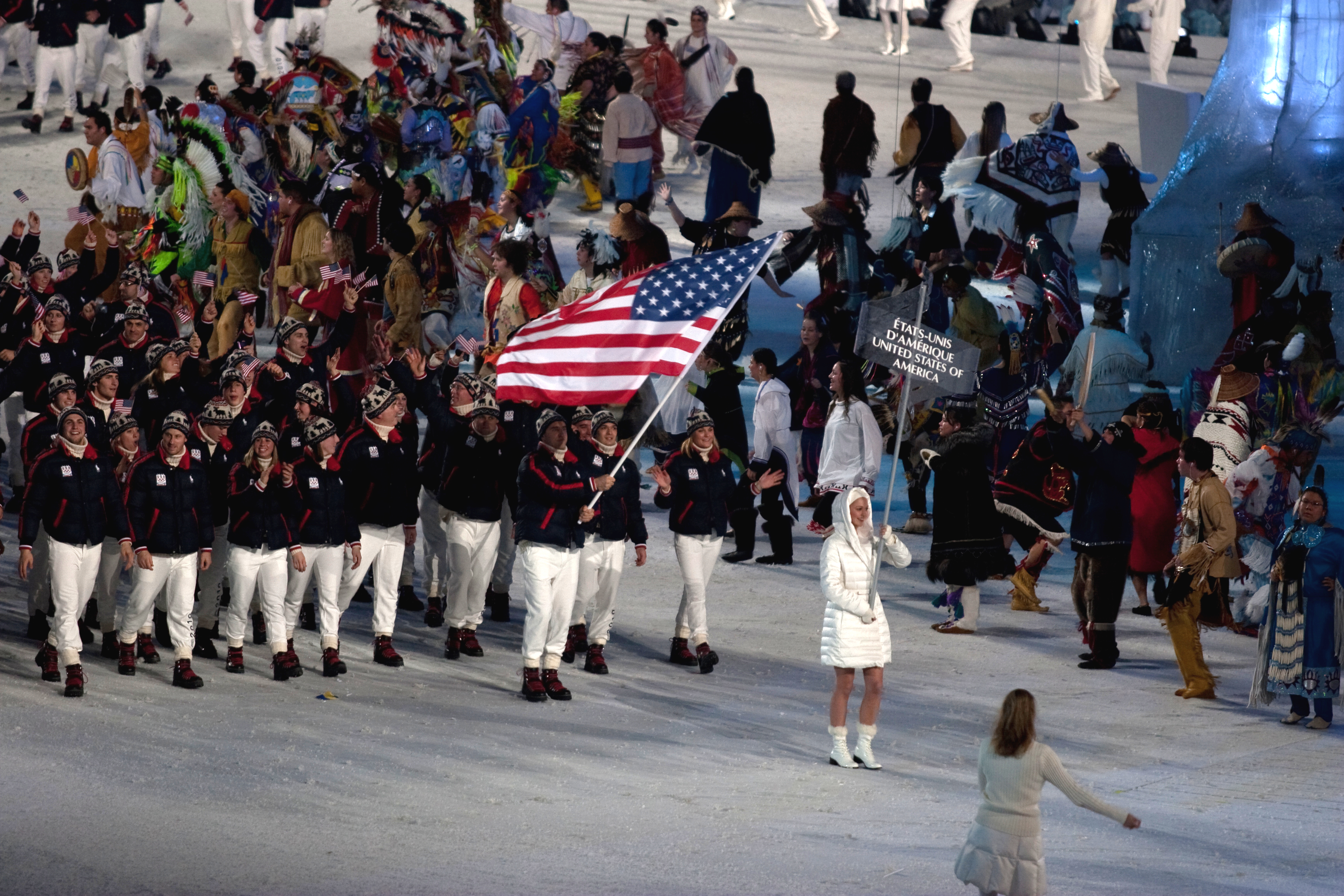
The United States team entering during the opening ceremony.

== Medalists ==
The following U.S. competitors won medals at the games. In the by discipline sections below, medalists' names are bolded.

Medal	Name	Sport	Event	Date
Gold	Hannah Kearney	Freestyle skiing	Women's moguls	February 13
Gold	Seth Wescott	Snowboarding	Men's snowboard cross	February 15
Gold	Lindsey Vonn	Alpine skiing	Women's downhill	February 17
Gold	Shaun White	Snowboarding	Men's halfpipe	February 17
Gold	Shani Davis	Speed skating	Men's 1000 meters	February 17
Gold	Evan Lysacek	Figure skating	Men's singles	February 18
Gold	Bode Miller	Alpine skiing	Men's combined	February 21
Gold	Bill Demong	Nordic combined	Individual large hill/10 km	February 25
Gold	Steve Holcomb; Steve Mesler; Curtis Tomasevicz; Justin Olsen	Bobsled	Four-man	February 27
Silver	Apolo Ohno	Short track speed skating	Men's 1500 meters	February 13
Silver	Johnny Spillane	Nordic combined	Individual normal hill/10 km	February 14
Silver	Julia Mancuso	Alpine skiing	Women's downhill	February 17
Silver	Julia Mancuso	Alpine skiing	Women's combined	February 18
Silver	Hannah Teter	Snowboarding	Women's halfpipe	February 18
Silver	Bode Miller	Alpine skiing	Men's super-G	February 19
Silver	Shani Davis	Speed skating	Men's 1500 meters	February 20
Silver	Meryl Davis; Charlie White	Figure skating	Ice dancing	February 22
Silver	Brett Camerota; Todd Lodwick; Bill Demong; Johnny Spillane	Nordic combined	Team competition	February 23
Silver	Jeret Peterson	Freestyle skiing	Men's aerials	February 25
Silver	United States women's national ice hockey team: Kacey Bellamy; Caitlin Cahow; Lisa Chesson; Julie Chu; Natalie Darwitz; Meghan Duggan; Molly Engstrom; Hilary Knight; Jocelyne Lamoureux; Monique Lamoureux; Erika Lawler; Gisele Marvin; Brianne McLaughlin; Jenny Potter; Angela Ruggiero; Molly Schaus; Kelli Stack; Karen Thatcher; Jessie Vetter; Kerry Weiland; Jinelle Zaugg-Siergiej	Ice hockey	Women's tournament	February 25
Silver	Johnny Spillane	Nordic combined	Individual large hill/10 km	February 25
Silver	Katherine Reutter	Short track speed skating	Women's 1000 meters	February 26
Silver	Chad Hedrick; Brian Hansen; Jonathan Kuck; Trevor Marsicano	Speed skating	Men's team pursuit	February 27
Silver	United States men's national ice hockey team: David Backes; Dustin Brown; Ryan Callahan; Chris Drury; Tim Gleason; Erik Johnson; Jack Johnson; Patrick Kane; Ryan Kesler; Phil Kessel; Jamie Langenbrunner; Ryan Malone; Ryan Miller; Brooks Orpik; Zach Parise; Joe Pavelski; Jonathan Quick; Brian Rafalski; Bobby Ryan; Paul Stastny; Ryan Suter; Tim Thomas; Ryan Whitney	Ice hockey	Men's tournament	February 28
Bronze	Shannon Bahrke	Freestyle skiing	Women's moguls	February 13
Bronze	J. R. Celski	Short track speed skating	Men's 1500 meters	February 13
Bronze	Bryon Wilson	Freestyle skiing	Men's moguls	February 14
Bronze	Bode Miller	Alpine skiing	Men's downhill	February 15
Bronze	Scott Lago	Snowboarding	Men's halfpipe	February 17
Bronze	Chad Hedrick	Speed skating	Men's 1000 meters	February 17
Bronze	Kelly Clark	Snowboarding	Women's halfpipe	February 18
Bronze	Andrew Weibrecht	Alpine skiing	Men's super-G	February 19
Bronze	Lindsey Vonn	Alpine skiing	Women's super-G	February 20
Bronze	Apolo Ohno	Short track speed skating	Men's 1000 meters	February 20
Bronze	Erin Pac; Elana Meyers	Bobsled	Two-woman	February 24
Bronze	Allison Baver; Kimberly Derrick^{[a]} Alyson Dudek; Lana Gehring; Katherine Reutter	Short track speed skating	Women's 3000 meter relay	February 24
Bronze	J. R. Celski; Simon Cho^{[a]} Travis Jayner; Apolo Ohno; Jordan Malone	Short Track speed skating	Men's 5000 meter relay	February 26

Medals by sport
Sport	1st place, gold medalist(s)	2nd place, silver medalist(s)	3rd place, bronze medalist(s)	Total
Alpine skiing	2	3	3	**8**
Snowboarding	2	1	2	**5**
Nordic combined	1	3	0	**4**
Speed skating	1	2	1	**4**
Freestyle skiing	1	1	2	**4**
Figure skating	1	1	0	**2**
Bobsled	1	0	1	**2**
Short track speed skating	0	2	4	**6**
Ice hockey	0	2	0	**2**
Total	9	15	13	37

Medals by day
Day	Date	1st place, gold medalist(s)	2nd place, silver medalist(s)	3rd place, bronze medalist(s)	Total
1	February 13	1	1	2	**4**
2	February 14	0	1	1	**2**
3	February 15	1	0	1	**2**
5	February 17	3	1	2	**6**
6	February 18	1	2	1	**4**
7	February 19	0	1	1	**2**
8	February 20	0	1	2	**3**
9	February 21	1	0	0	**1**
10	February 22	0	1	0	**1**
11	February 23	0	1	0	**1**
12	February 24	0	0	2	**2**
13	February 25	1	3	0	**4**
14	February 26	0	1	1	**2**
15	February 27	1	1	0	**2**
16	February 28	0	1	0	**1**
Total		9	15	13	37

Medals by gender
Gender	1st place, gold medalist(s)	2nd place, silver medalist(s)	3rd place, bronze medalist(s)	Total	Percentage
Male	7	9	8	**24**	64.9%
Female	2	5	5	**12**	32.4%
Mixed	0	1	0	**1**	2.7%
Total	9	15	13	37	100%

Multiple medalists
Name	Sport	1st place, gold medalist(s)	2nd place, silver medalist(s)	3rd place, bronze medalist(s)	Total
Bode Miller	Alpine skiing	1	1	1	**3**
Johnny Spillane	Nordic combined	0	3	0	**3**
Apolo Ohno	Short track speed skating	0	1	2	**3**
Shani Davis	Speed skating	1	1	0	**2**
Bill Demong	Nordic combined	1	1	0	**2**
Lindsey Vonn	Alpine skiing	1	0	1	**2**
Julia Mancuso	Alpine skiing	0	2	0	**2**
Chad Hedrick	Speed skating	0	1	1	**2**
Katherine Reutter	Short track speed skating	0	1	1	**2**
J. R. Celski	Short track speed skating	0	0	2	**2**

^{a} Athletes who participated in the heats only.

== Alpine skiing ==
The United States men's and women's teams were announced on January 26, 2010.

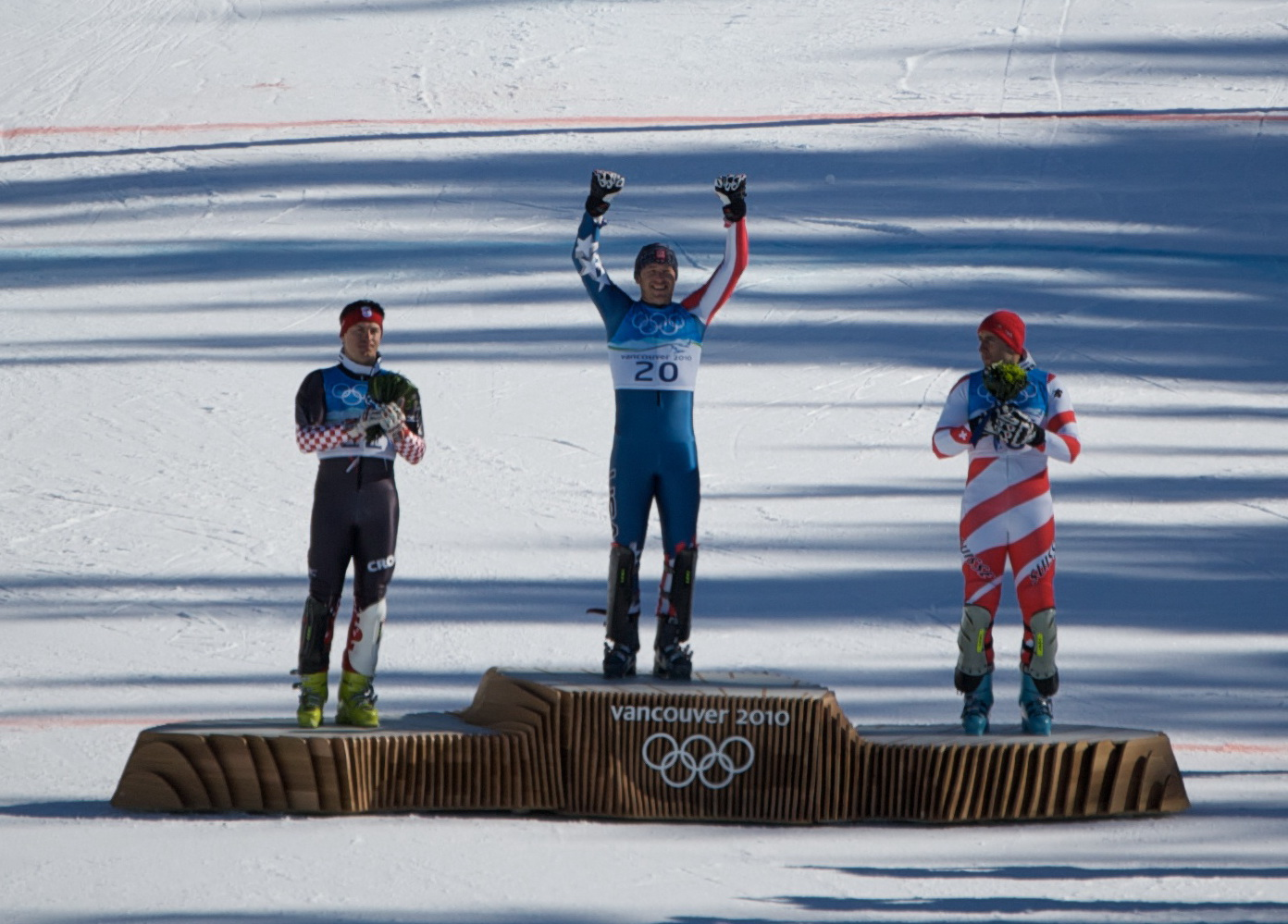
The medal ceremony for the men's combined. From left: Ivica Kostelić (silver), Bode Miller (gold) and Silvan Zurbriggen (bronze).

Men

Athlete	Event	Run 1	Run 2	Total	Rank
Bode Miller	Downhill	—N/a		1:54.40	3rd place, bronze medalist(s)
Steven Nyman	Downhill	—N/a		1:55.71	20
Marco Sullivan	Downhill	—N/a		2:07.76	60
Andrew Weibrecht	Downhill	—N/a		1:55.74	21
Will Brandenburg	Combined	1:56.28	50.78	2:47.06	10
Ted Ligety	Combined	1:55.06	50.76	2:45.82	5
Bode Miller	Combined	1:53.91	51.01	2:44.92	1st place, gold medalist(s)
Andrew Weibrecht	Combined	1:55.23	52.35	2:47.58	11
Ted Ligety	Super-G	—N/a		1:31.70	19
Bode Miller	Super-G	—N/a		1:30.62	2nd place, silver medalist(s)
Marco Sullivan	Super-G	—N/a		1:32.09	23
Andrew Weibrecht	Super-G	—N/a		1:30.65	3rd place, bronze medalist(s)
Tommy Ford	Giant slalom	1:19.10	1:22.05	2:41.15	26
Ted Ligety	Giant slalom	1:17.87	1:21.24	2:39.11	9
Bode Miller	Giant slalom	DNF			
Jake Zamansky	Giant slalom	1:19.85	1:22.50	2:42.35	31
Jimmy Cochran	Slalom	54.94	DNF		
Nolan Kasper	Slalom	50.66	52.51	1:43.17	24
Ted Ligety	Slalom	DNF			
Bode Miller	Slalom	DNF			

Women

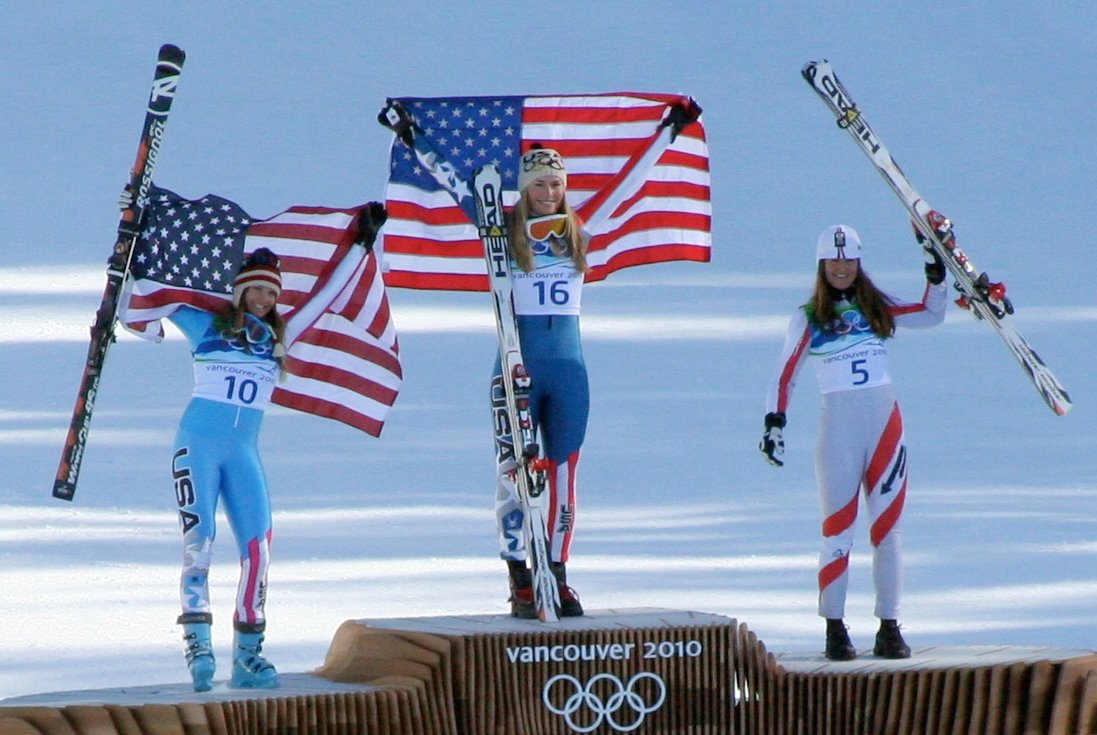
The medal ceremony for the women's downhill. From left: Julia Mancuso (silver), Lindsey Vonn (gold) and Elisabeth Görgl (bronze).

Athlete	Event	Run 1	Run 2	Total	Rank
Stacey Cook	Downhill	—N/a		1:46.98	11
Julia Mancuso	Downhill	—N/a		1:44.75	2nd place, silver medalist(s)
Alice McKennis	Downhill	—N/a		DSQ	
Lindsey Vonn	Downhill	—N/a		1:44.19	1st place, gold medalist(s)
Julia Mancuso	Combined	1:24.96	45:12	2:10.08	2nd place, silver medalist(s)
Kaylin Richardson	Combined	1:27.64	45.76	2:13.40	17
Leanne Smith	Combined	1:27.27	46.70	2:13.97	21
Lindsey Vonn	Combined	1:24.16	DNF		
Julia Mancuso	Super-G	—N/a		1:21.50	9
Chelsea Marshall	Super-G	—N/a		DNF	
Leanne Smith	Super-G	—N/a		1:23.05	18
Lindsey Vonn	Super-G	—N/a		1:20.88	3rd place, bronze medalist(s)
Julia Mancuso	Giant slalom	1:16.42	1:11.24	2:27.66	8
Megan McJames	Giant slalom	1:18.30	1:14.68	2:32.98	32
Sarah Schleper	Giant slalom	1:16.19	1:12.17	2:28.36	14
Lindsey Vonn	Giant slalom	DNF			
Hailey Duke	Slalom	54.02	54.67	1:48.69	30
Megan McJames	Slalom	54.41	DNF		
Sarah Schleper	Slalom	51.83	54.05	1:45.88	16
Lindsey Vonn	Slalom	DNF			

== Biathlon ==
The United States pre-qualified three men and one woman for the 2010 Olympics based on their top-30 status in the overall World Cup standings. The remaining men's and women's teams were officially announced on January 11, 2010, after the conclusion of the IBU cup races at Altenberg, Germany.

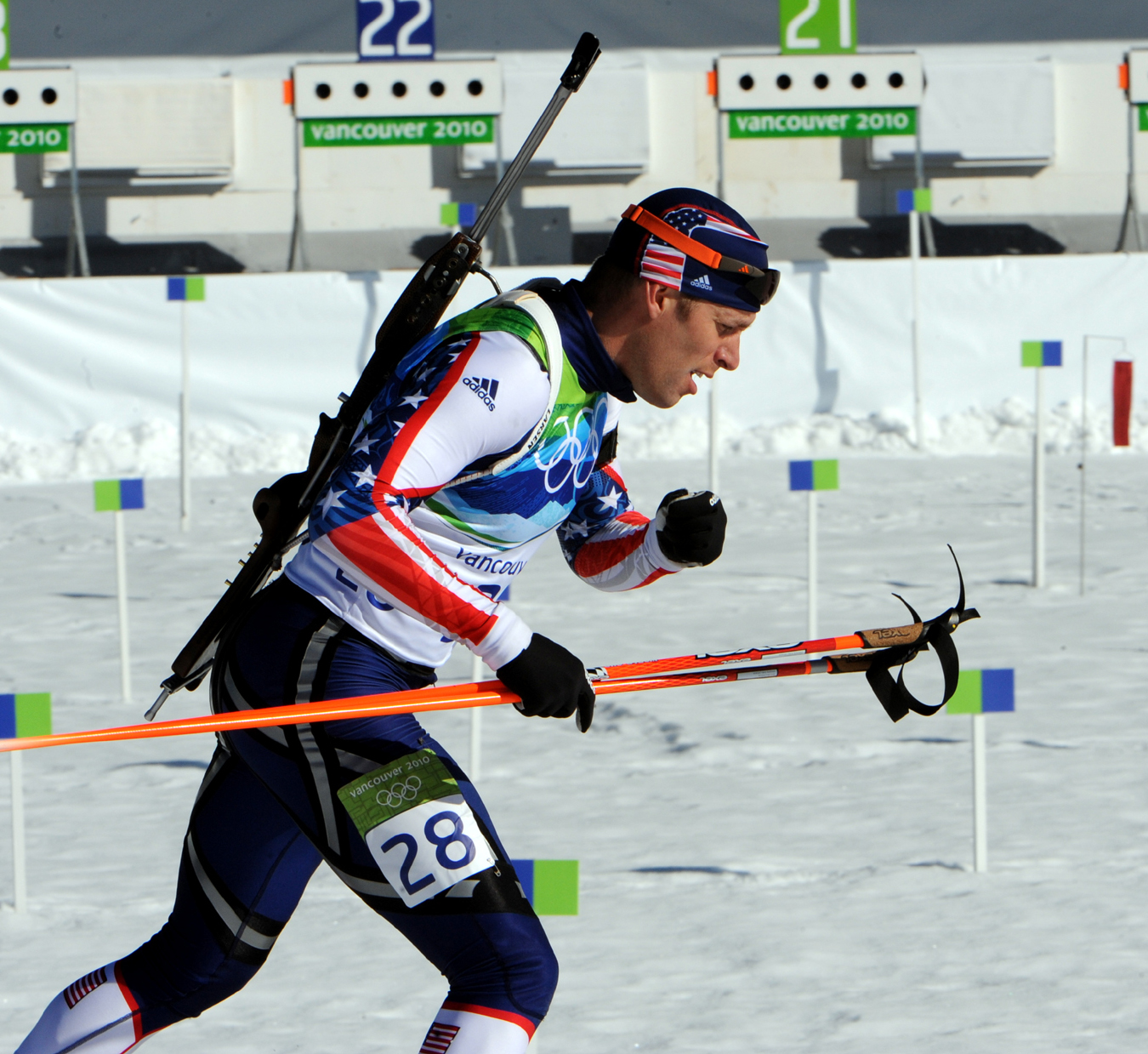
Jeremy Teela departs the shooting range of the 15 km mass start.

Men

Athlete	Event	Time	Rank
Lowell Bailey	10 km sprint	26:26.6	36
Tim Burke	10 km sprint	26:54.8	47
Jay Hakkinen	10 km sprint	27:17.4	54
Jeremy Teela	10 km sprint	25:21.7	9
Lowell Bailey	12.5 km pursuit	36:34.0	36
Tim Burke	12.5 km pursuit	37:26.8	46
Jay Hakkinen	12.5 km pursuit	40:33.2	57
Jeremy Teela	12.5 km pursuit	35:45.4	24
Lowell Bailey	20 km individual	54:23.1	57
Tim Burke	20 km individual	53:22.6	45
Jay Hakkinen	20 km individual	57:01.8	76
Wynn Roberts	20 km individual	58:49.2	86
Tim Burke	15 km mass start	36:44.7	18
Jeremy Teela	15 km mass start	38:36.1	29
Lowell Bailey; Tim Burke; Jay Hakkinen; Jeremy Teela	4 x 7.5 km relay	1:27:58.3	12

Women

Athlete	Event	Time	Rank
Lanny Barnes	7.5 km sprint	23:26.0	78
Haley Johnson	7.5 km sprint	23:35.4	80
Laura Spector	7.5 km sprint	23:18.1	77
Sara Studebaker	7.5 km sprint	22:05.3	45
Sara Studebaker	10 km pursuit	35:00.1	46
Lanny Barnes	15 km individual	43:31.8	23
Haley Johnson	15 km individual	47:19.4	66
Laura Spector	15 km individual	47:19.3	65
Sara Studebaker	15 km individual	44:27.3	34
Lanny Barnes; Haley Johnson; Laura Spector; Sara Studebaker	4 x 6 km relay	1:15:47.5	17

== Bobsleigh ==
The US has qualified three sleds in all three events.

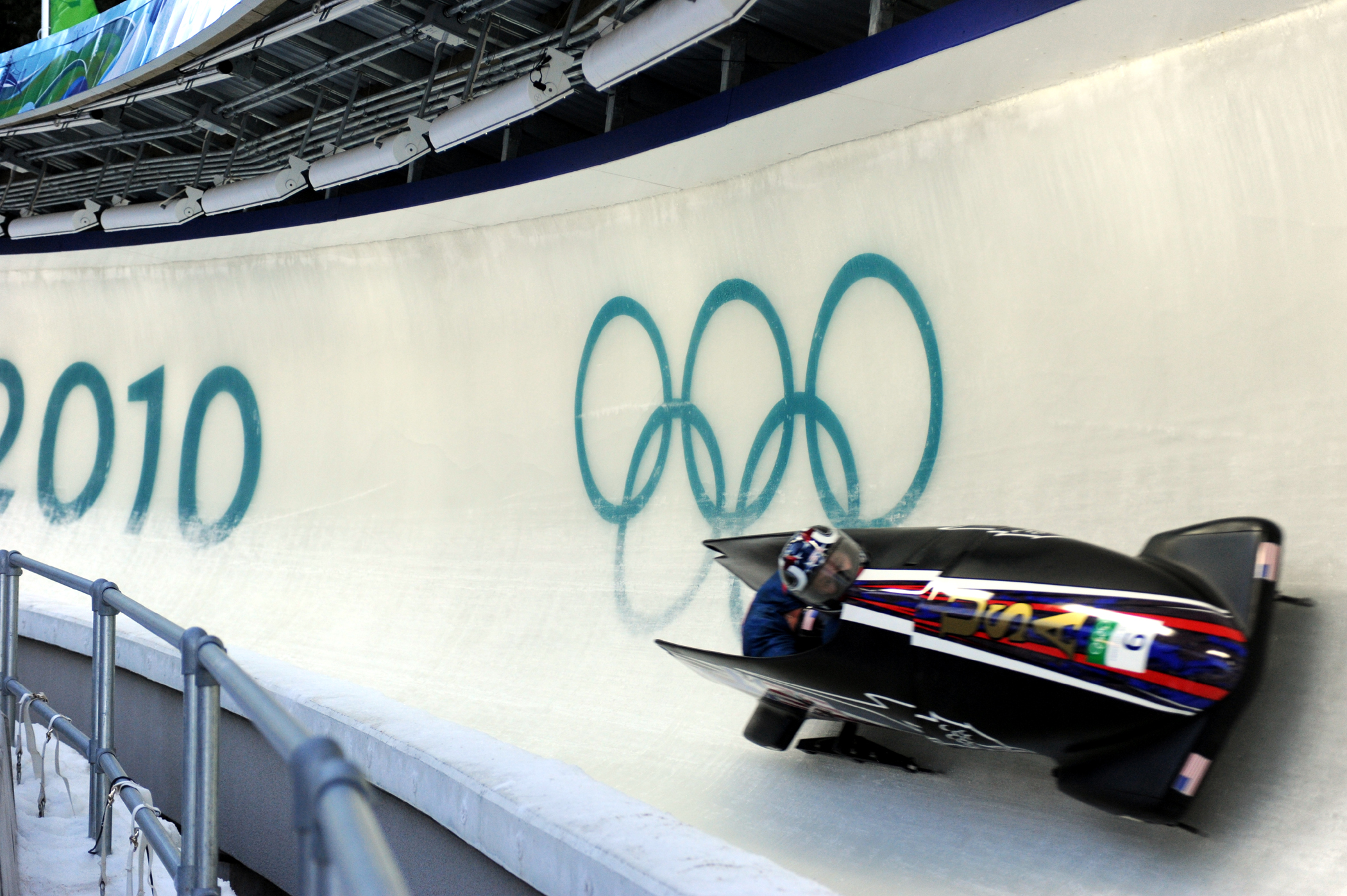
Steve Holcomb and Curtis Tomasevicz aboard USA I in the first run of the two-man bobsled competition.

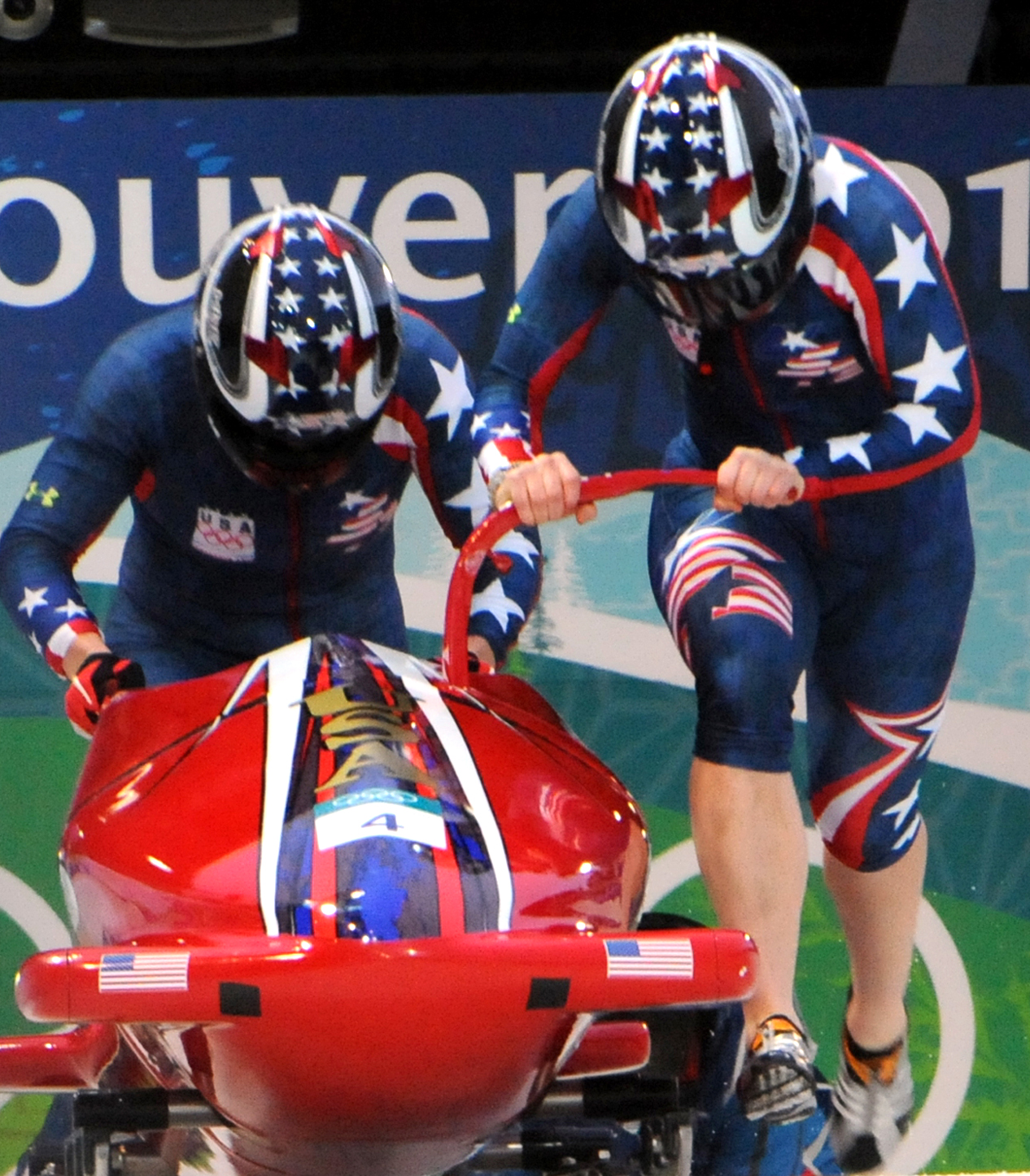
Shauna Rohbock (right) and Michelle Rzepka push USA I to start the third run of the two women's bobsled event

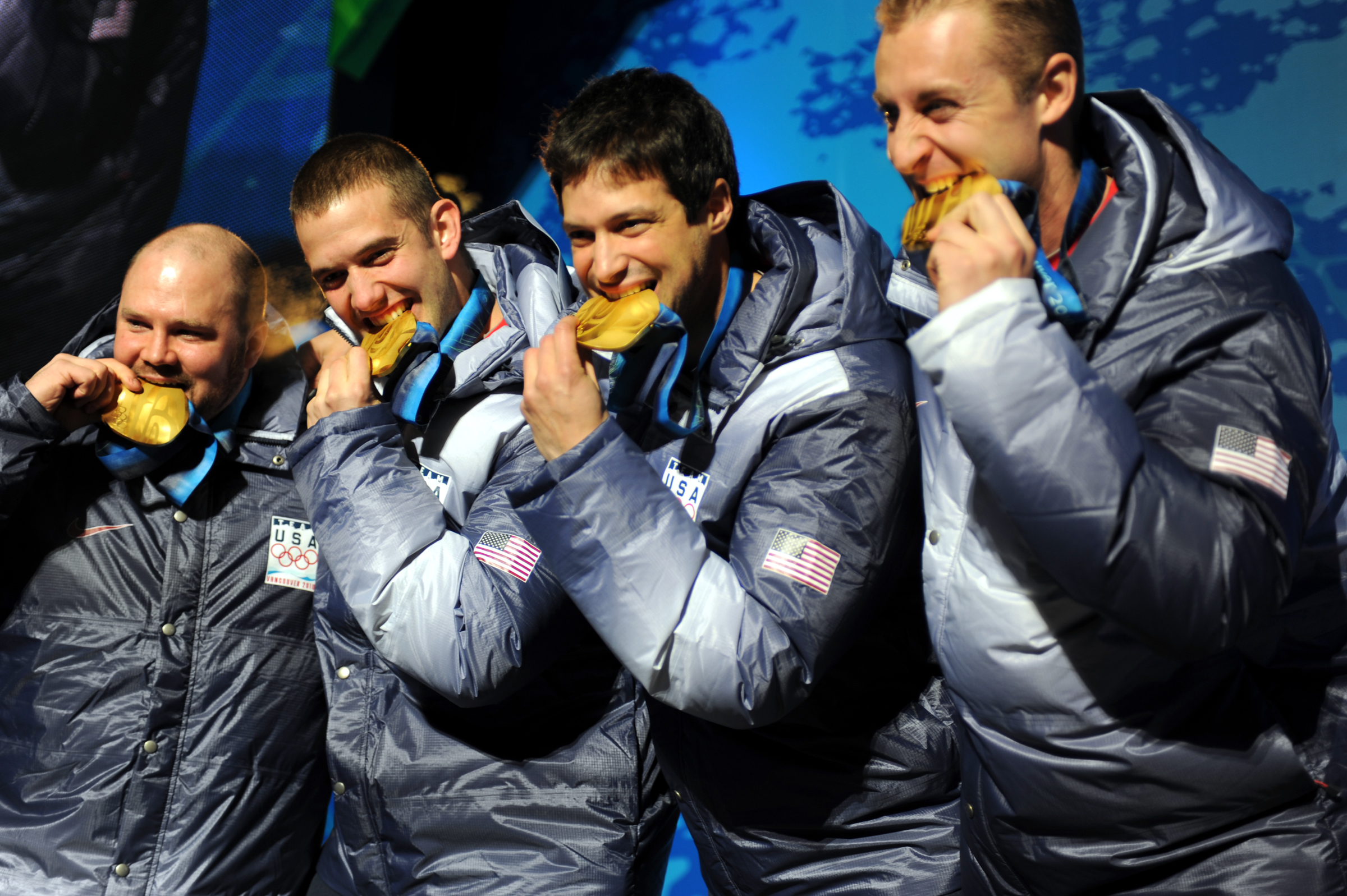
The USA-1 team with their gold medals. From left to right: Holcomb, Olsen, Mesler and Tomasevicz.

Men

Athletes (driver listed first)	Sled	Event	Run 1		Run 2		Run 3		Run 4		Total	
Athletes (driver listed first)	Sled	Event	Time	Rank	Time	Rank	Time	Rank	Time	Rank	Time	Rank
Steve Holcomb; Curtis Tomasevicz	USA I	Two-man	51.89	6	52.04	4	51.98	5	52.03	7	3:27.94	6
John Napier; Steven Langton	USA II	Two-man	52.28	12	52.45	11	52.31	11	52.36	10	3:29.40	20
Mike Kohn; Nick Cunningham	USA III	Two-man	52.47	16	52.71	14	52.25	12	52.35	9	3:29.78	12
Steve Holcomb; Justin Olsen; Steve Mesler; Curtis Tomasevicz	USA I	Four-man	50.89	1	50.86	1	51.19	1	51.52	3	3:24.46	1st place, gold medalist(s)
John Napier; Charles Berkeley; Steven Langton; Christopher Fogt	USA II	Four-man	51.30	7	53.41	20	DNS					
Mike Kohn; Jamie Moriarty; Bill Schuffenhauer; Nick Cunningham	USA III	Four-man	51.69	15	51.42	11	52.10	13	52.11	13	3:27.32	13

Women

Athletes (driver listed first)	Sled	Event	Run 1		Run 2		Run 3		Run 4		Total	
Athletes (driver listed first)	Sled	Event	Time	Rank	Time	Rank	Time	Rank	Time	Rank	Time	Rank
Shauna Rohbock; Michelle Rzepka	USA I	Two-woman	53.73	7	53.36	7	53.53	5	53.44	4	3:34.06	6
Erin Pac; Elana Meyers	USA II	Two-woman	53.28	2	53.05	2	53.29	2	53.78	8	3:33.40	3rd place, bronze medalist(s)
Bree Schaaf; Emily Azevedo	USA III	Two-woman	53.76	8	53.33	6	53.56	6	53.40	3	3:34.05	5

== Cross-country skiing ==
The United States men's and women's teams were announced on January 19, 2010. The United States had three automatic qualifiers. After the re-allocation of Olympic berths, the U.S. is expected to receive up to four additional spots.

Distance
Men

Athlete	Event	Classical		Freestyle		Total	
Athlete	Event	Time	Rank	Time	Rank	Time	Rank
Kris Freeman	15 km freestyle	—N/a				36:41.6	59
Simi Hamilton	15 km freestyle	—N/a				37:30.5	64
Garrott Kuzzy	15 km freestyle	—N/a				36:41.5	58
James Southam	15 km freestyle	—N/a				35:58.2	48
Kris Freeman	30 km pursuit	43:17.1	48	39:16.1	39	1:23:02.6	45
James Southam	30 km pursuit	41:29.5	34	38:47.7	34	1:20:46.2	34
Kris Freeman	50 km classical	—N/a				DNF	
James Southam	50 km classical	—N/a				2:10:08.3	28
Simi Hamilton; Torin Koos; Garrott Kuzzy; Andrew Newell	4 x 10 km relay	—N/a				1:51:27.7	13

Women

Athlete	Event	Classical		Freestyle		Total	
Athlete	Event	Time	Rank	Time	Rank	Time	Rank
Morgan Arritola	10 km freestyle	—N/a				27:04.4	34
Holly Brooks	10 km freestyle	—N/a				27:17.6	42
Caitlin Compton	10 km freestyle	—N/a				26:49.1	30
Liz Stephen	10 km freestyle	—N/a				27:41.1	50
Morgan Arritola	15 km pursuit	23:06.6	43	19:50.5	24	43:25.9	38
Holly Brooks	15 km pursuit	23:38.2	53	21:31.9	58	45:38.8	56
Caitlin Compton	15 km pursuit	24:01.2	56	19:46.8	23	44:23.3	43
Liz Stephen	15 km pursuit	24:21.3	60	21:05.3	52	45:53.8	58
Morgan Arritola	30 km classical	—N/a				DNF	
Holly Brooks	30 km classical	—N/a				1:38:14.5	36
Kikkan Randall	30 km classical	—N/a				1:34:59.0	24
Morgan Arritola; Holly Brooks; Caitlin Compton; Kikkan Randall	4 x 5 km relay	—N/a				58:57.5	11

Sprint
Men

Athletes	Event	Qualification		Quarterfinal		Semifinal		Final	
Athletes	Event	Time	Rank	Time	Rank	Time	Rank	Time	Rank
Simi Hamilton	Sprint	3:41.53	29 Q	3:43.4	6	Did not advance			
Torin Koos	Sprint	3:42.72	36	Did not advance					
Garrott Kuzzy	Sprint	3:47.46	47	Did not advance					
Andrew Newell	Sprint	3:46.77	45	Did not advance					
Torin Koos; Andrew Newell	Team sprint	—N/a				18:43.7	2 Q	19:21.6	9

Women

Athletes	Event	Qualification		Quarterfinal		Semifinal		Final	
Athletes	Event	Time	Rank	Time	Rank	Time	Rank	Time	Rank
Holly Brooks	Sprint	3:52.51	38	Did not advance					
Kikkan Randall	Sprint	3:44.97	10 Q	3:39.40	3 q	3:45.90	4	Did not advance	
Caitlin Compton; Kikkan Randall	Team sprint	—N/a				18:48.9	3 Q	18:51.6	6

== Curling ==
The United States has qualified a team in both the men's and women's tournaments.

Summary

Team	Event	Group stage										Tiebreaker	Semifinal	Final / BM	
Team	Event	Opposition Score	Opposition Score	Opposition Score	Opposition Score	Opposition Score	Opposition Score	Opposition Score	Opposition Score	Opposition Score	Rank	Opposition Score	Opposition Score	Opposition Score	Rank
John Benton; Jeff Isaacson; Chris Plys; John Shuster (S); Jason Smith	Men's tournament	GER; L 5–7	NOR; L 5–6	SUI; L 6–7	DEN; L 6–7	FRA; W 4–3	SWE; W 8–7	GBR; L 2–4	CAN; L 2–7	CHN; L 5–11	10	Did not advance			
Nicole Joraanstad; Debbie McCormick (S); Natalie Nicholson; Allison Pottinger; Tracy Sachtjen	Women's tournament	JPN; L 7–9	GER; L 5–6	DEN; L 6–7	RUS; W 6–4	GBR; W 6–5	CAN; L 2–9	SWE; L 3–9	CHN; L 5–6	SUI; L 3–10	10	Did not advance			

=== Men's tournament ===
Roster

Name	Position	Date of birth	Residence
John Shuster	Skip	November 3, 1982	Chisholm, Minnesota
John Benton	Lead	June 23, 1969	Stillwater, Minnesota
Jeff Isaacson	Second	July 14, 1983	Aurora, Minnesota
Jason Smith	Third	September 18, 1983	Robbinsdale, Minnesota
Chris Plys	Alternate	August 13, 1987	Duluth, Minnesota
Phill Drobnick	Head Coach	October 9, 1980	Virginia, Minnesota

Round-robin

Final round robin standings
Team	Skip	Pld	W	L	PF	PA	EW	EL	BE	SE	S%	Qualification
Canada	Kevin Martin	9	9	0	75	36	36	28	14	2	85%	Playoffs
Norway	Thomas Ulsrud	9	7	2	64	43	40	32	15	7	84%	Playoffs
Switzerland	Ralph Stöckli	9	6	3	53	44	35	33	20	8	81%	Playoffs
Sweden	Niklas Edin	9	5	4	50	52	34	36	20	6	82%	Tiebreaker
Great Britain	David Murdoch	9	5	4	57	44	35	29	20	9	81%	Tiebreaker
Germany	Andy Kapp	9	4	5	48	60	35	38	11	9	75%	
France	Thomas Dufour	9	3	6	37	63	22	34	16	7	73%	
China	Wang Fengchun	9	2	7	52	60	37	37	9	7	77%	
Denmark	Ulrik Schmidt	9	2	7	45	63	31	29	12	6	78%	
United States	John Shuster	9	2	7	43	59	32	41	18	9	76%	

Draw 1

Sheet C	1	2	3	4	5	6	7	8	9	10	Final
United States (Shuster) 🔨	0	1	0	2	0	0	1	0	1	0	5
Germany (Kapp)	1	0	2	0	1	1	0	2	0	0	7

Draw 2

Sheet D	1	2	3	4	5	6	7	8	9	10	11	Final
United States (Shuster) 🔨	0	0	0	1	0	0	2	0	2	0	0	5
Norway (Ulsrud)	0	1	0	0	1	0	0	2	0	1	1	6

Draw 3

Sheet B	1	2	3	4	5	6	7	8	9	10	11	Final
United States (Shuster)	0	0	0	2	1	1	1	1	0	0	0	6
Switzerland (Stöckli) 🔨	2	1	1	0	0	0	0	0	1	1	1	7

Draw 4

Sheet A	1	2	3	4	5	6	7	8	9	10	11	Final
Denmark (Schmidt) 🔨	0	2	0	1	0	0	1	1	0	1	1	7
United States (Shuster)	1	0	2	0	0	2	0	0	1	0	0	6

Draw 6

Sheet C	1	2	3	4	5	6	7	8	9	10	Final
France (Dufour) 🔨	0	0	0	1	0	0	2	0	0	0	3
United States (Plys)	0	0	0	0	1	0	0	0	2	1	4

Draw 7

Sheet D	1	2	3	4	5	6	7	8	9	10	11	Final
Sweden (Edin) 🔨	0	0	1	0	2	0	3	0	0	1	0	7
United States (Shuster)	1	1	0	2	0	1	0	0	2	0	1	8

Draw 9

Sheet A	1	2	3	4	5	6	7	8	9	10	Final
United States (Shuster) 🔨	0	1	0	0	0	0	0	1	0	0	2
Great Britain (Murdoch)	0	0	0	0	2	1	0	0	0	1	4

Draw 10

Sheet B	1	2	3	4	5	6	7	8	9	10	Final
Canada (Martin) 🔨	0	1	0	2	0	1	1	0	2	x	7
United States (Shuster)	1	0	1	0	0	0	0	0	0	x	2

Draw 11

Sheet D	1	2	3	4	5	6	7	8	9	10	Final
China (Li) 🔨	3	0	1	1	0	0	3	0	3	x	11
United States (Shuster)	0	2	0	0	1	1	0	1	0	x	5

=== Women's tournament ===
Roster

Name	Position	Date of birth	Residence
Debbie McCormick	Skip	January 18, 1974	Rio, Wisconsin
Natalie Nicholson	Lead	March 10, 1976	Bemidji, Minnesota
Nicole Joraanstad	Second	November 10, 1980	Madison, Wisconsin
Allison Pottinger	Third	July 5, 1973	Eden Prairie, Minnesota
Tracy Sachtjen	Alternate	February 20, 1969	Lodi, Wisconsin
Wally Henry	Head Coach	May 5, 1947	Madison, Wisconsin

Round-robin

Final round robin standings
Team	Skip	Pld	W	L	PF	PA	EW	EL	BE	SE	S%	Qualification
Canada	Cheryl Bernard	9	8	1	56	37	40	29	20	13	81%	Playoffs
Sweden	Anette Norberg	9	7	2	56	52	36	36	13	5	79%	Playoffs
China	Wang Bingyu	9	6	3	61	47	39	37	12	7	74%	Playoffs
Switzerland	Mirjam Ott	9	6	3	67	48	40	36	7	12	76%	Playoffs
Denmark	Angelina Jensen	9	4	5	49	61	31	40	15	5	74%	
Germany	Andrea Schöpp	9	3	6	52	56	35	40	15	4	75%	
Great Britain	Eve Muirhead	9	3	6	54	59	36	41	11	10	75%	
Japan	Moe Meguro	9	3	6	64	70	36	37	13	5	73%	
Russia	Liudmila Privivkova	9	3	6	53	60	36	40	14	13	77%	
United States	Debbie McCormick	9	2	7	43	65	36	36	12	12	77%	

Draw 1

Sheet A	1	2	3	4	5	6	7	8	9	10	Final
United States (McCormick) 🔨	1	2	0	1	0	2	0	1	0	0	7
Japan (Meguro)	0	0	1	0	3	0	3	0	1	1	9

Draw 2

Sheet B	1	2	3	4	5	6	7	8	9	10	Final
Germany (Schöpp) 🔨	1	0	0	0	3	0	0	2	0	0	6
United States (McCormick)	0	0	0	1	0	1	1	0	1	1	5

Draw 4

Sheet D	1	2	3	4	5	6	7	8	9	10	Final
Denmark (Jensen)	1	1	0	0	0	1	3	0	1	0	7
United States (McCormick) 🔨	0	0	2	1	1	0	0	1	0	1	6

Draw 5

Sheet B	1	2	3	4	5	6	7	8	9	10	Final
Russia (Sidorova) 🔨	0	0	0	1	0	0	2	0	1	0	4
United States (McCormick)	0	0	1	0	2	0	0	1	0	2	6

Draw 7

Sheet B	1	2	3	4	5	6	7	8	9	10	11	Final
United States (McCormick)	0	0	0	1	1	1	0	0	1	1	1	6
Great Britain (Muirhead) 🔨	1	0	2	0	0	0	2	0	0	0	0	5

Draw 8

Sheet C	1	2	3	4	5	6	7	8	9	10	Final
Canada (Bernard)	0	0	4	0	2	0	3	x	x	x	9
United States (McCormick) 🔨	0	1	0	0	0	1	0	x	x	x	2

Draw 9

Sheet D	1	2	3	4	5	6	7	8	9	10	Final
United States (McCormick)	0	0	1	0	1	0	1	0	0	x	3
Sweden (Norberg) 🔨	1	0	0	2	0	3	0	0	3	x	9

Draw 11

Sheet C	1	2	3	4	5	6	7	8	9	10	Final
United States (McCormick)	0	1	1	0	0	2	0	1	0	0	5
China (Wang) 🔨	1	0	0	2	1	0	1	0	0	1	6

Draw 12

Sheet A	1	2	3	4	5	6	7	8	9	10	Final
Switzerland (Ott)	0	0	2	1	3	1	3	x	x	x	10
United States (McCormick) 🔨	1	2	0	0	0	0	0	x	x	x	3

== Figure skating ==
The United States has qualified three entrants in men's singles, two in ladies' singles, two in pair skating, and three in ice dancing, for a total of 16 athletes.

Individual

Athlete(s)	Event	SP		FS		Total	
Athlete(s)	Event	Points	Rank	Points	Rank	Points	Rank
Jeremy Abbott	Men's	69.40	15	149.56	9	218.96	9
Evan Lysacek	Men's	90.30	2	167.37	1	257.67	1st place, gold medalist(s)
Johnny Weir	Men's	82.10	6	156.77	6	238.87	6
Rachael Flatt	Ladies'	64.64	5	117.85	8	182.49	7
Mirai Nagasu	Ladies'	63.76	6	126.39	5	190.15	4

Mixed

Athlete(s)	Event	CD		SP/OD		FS/FD		Total	
Athlete(s)	Event	Points	Rank	Points	Rank	Points	Rank	Points	Rank
Caydee Denney / Jeremy Barrett	Pairs	—N/a		53.26	14	105.07	12	158.33	13
Amanda Evora / Mark Ladwig	Pairs	—N/a		57.86	10	114.06	10	171.92	10
Meryl Davis / Charlie White	Ice dancing	41.47	3	67.08	2	107.19	2	215.74	2nd place, silver medalist(s)
Tanith Belbin / Benjamin Agosto	Ice dancing	40.83	4	62.50	4	99.74	4	203.07	4
Emily Samuelson / Evan Bates	Ice dancing	31.37	14	53.99	11	88.94	11	174.30	11

== Freestyle skiing ==
The US Olympic freestyle team was announced on January 26, 2010.

Aerials
Men

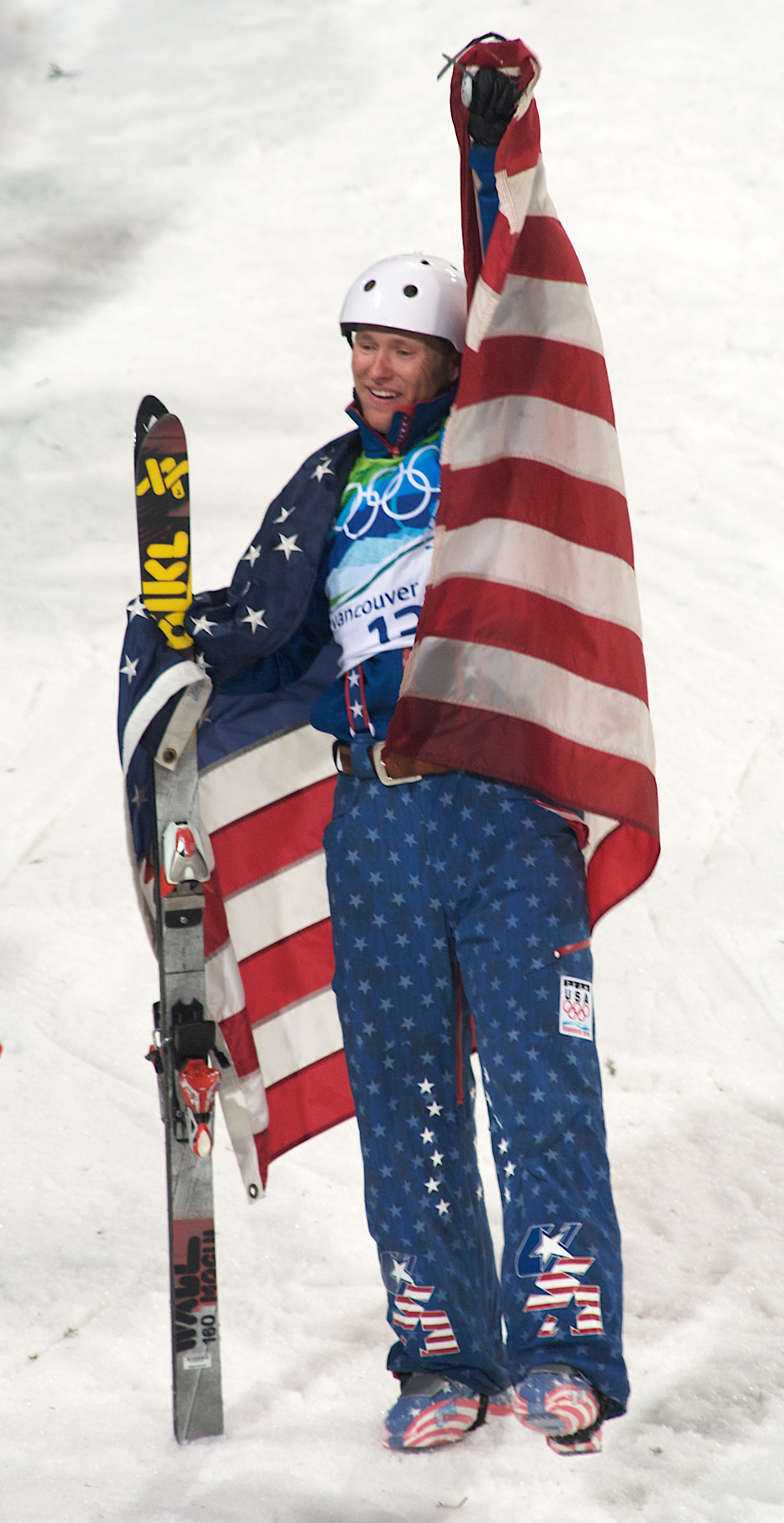
Jeret "Speedy" Peterson celebrates after his silver medal jump in men's aerials.

Athlete	Event	Qualifying						Final					
Athlete	Event	Jump 1		Jump 2		Total		Jump 1		Jump 2		Total	
Points	Rank	Points	Rank	Points	Rank	Points	Rank	Points	Rank	Points	Rank	Points	Rank
Scotty Bahrke	Aerials	82.52	22	86.20	22	168.72	23	Did not advance					
Matt DePeters	Aerials	101.84	18	100.64	19	202.48	17	Did not advance					
Dylan Ferguson	Aerials	DNS (illness)											
Jeret Peterson	Aerials	119.47	8	117.87	7	237.34	5 Q	118.59	5	128.62	3	247.21	2nd place, silver medalist(s)
Ryan St. Onge	Aerials	122.57	6	118.10	6	240.67	2 Q	115.27	8	124.66	5	239.93	4

Women

Athlete	Event	Qualifying						Final					
Athlete	Event	Jump 1		Jump 2		Total		Jump 1		Jump 2		Total	
Points	Rank	Points	Rank	Points	Rank	Points	Rank	Points	Rank	Points	Rank	Points	Rank
Ashley Caldwell	Aerials	76.66	16	82.68	8	162.34	12 Q	86.53	10	84.57	8	171.10	10
Emily Cook	Aerials	86.31	12	93.94	3	180.25	5 Q	65.03	11	83.89	9	148.92	11
Jana Lindsey	Aerials	64.10	19	87.59	5	151.69	17	Did not advance					
Lacy Schnoor	Aerials	87.77	10	81.74	10	169.51	6 Q	89.88	8	83.01	10	172.89	9

Moguls
Men

Athlete	Event	Qualifying			Final		
Athlete	Event	Time	Points	Rank	Time	Points	Rank
Patrick Deneen	Moguls	24.39	23.97	10 Q	RNS		=19
Michael Morse	Moguls	26.06	23.08	19 Q	24.45	23.38	15
Nate Roberts	Moguls	24.23	23.22	16 Q	RNS		=19
Bryon Wilson	Moguls	24.01	25.06	3 Q	24.00	26.08	3rd place, bronze medalist(s)

Women

Athlete	Event	Qualifying			Final		
Athlete	Event	Time	Points	Rank	Time	Points	Rank
Shannon Bahrke	Moguls	29.74	24.27	6 Q	27.90	25.43	3rd place, bronze medalist(s)
Hannah Kearney	Moguls	27.97	25.96	1 Q	27.86	26.63	1st place, gold medalist(s)
Heather McPhie	Moguls	28.62	25.03	3 Q	30.92	14.52	18
Michelle Roark	Moguls	29.64	23.98	7 Q	32.27	15.90	17

Ski cross

Athlete	Event	Qualifying		1/8 final	Quarterfinal	Semifinal	Final	
Athlete	Event	Time	Rank	Position	Position	Position	Position	Rank
Casey Puckett	Men's ski cross	1:14.35	12 Q	4	Did not advance			23
Daron Rahlves	Men's ski cross	1:14.91	15 Q	3	Did not advance			28

== Ice hockey ==
Summary

Team	Event	Group stage				Qualification playoff	Quarterfinal	Semifinal / Pl.	Final / BM / Pl.	
Team	Event	Opposition Score	Opposition Score	Opposition Score	Rank	Opposition Score	Opposition Score	Opposition Score	Opposition Score	Rank
United States men's	Men's tournament	Switzerland; W 3–1	Norway; W 6–1	Canada; W 5–3	1 QQ	Bye	Switzerland; W 2–0	Finland; W 6–1	Canada; L 2–3 OT	2nd place, silver medalist(s)
United States women's	Women's tournament	China; W 12–1	Russia; W 13–0	Finland; W 6–0	1 Q	—N/a		Sweden; W 9–1	Canada; L 0–2	2nd place, silver medalist(s)

=== Men's tournament ===
Roster
The following is the American roster in the men's ice hockey tournament of the 2010 Winter Olympics.

No.	Pos.	Name	Height	Weight	Birthdate	Birthplace	2009–10 team
39	G	Ryan Miller	188 cm (6 ft 2 in)	75 kg (165 lb)	17 July 1980	East Lansing, MI	(United States) Buffalo Sabres (NHL)
29	G	Jonathan Quick	185 cm (6 ft 1 in)	91 kg (201 lb)	21 January 1986	Hamden, CT	(United States) Los Angeles Kings (NHL)
30	G	Tim Thomas	180 cm (5 ft 11 in)	91 kg (201 lb)	15 April 1974	Davison, MI	(United States) Boston Bruins (NHL)
4	D	Tim Gleason	183 cm (6 ft 0 in)	98 kg (216 lb)	29 January 1983	Clawson, MI	(United States) Carolina Hurricanes (NHL)
6	D	Erik Johnson	193 cm (6 ft 4 in)	107 kg (236 lb)	21 March 1988	Bloomington, MN	(United States) St. Louis Blues (NHL)
3	D	Jack Johnson	185 cm (6 ft 1 in)	102 kg (225 lb)	13 January 1987	Indianapolis, IN	(United States) Los Angeles Kings (NHL)
44	D	Brooks Orpik	188 cm (6 ft 2 in)	99 kg (218 lb)	26 September 1980	San Francisco, CA	(United States) Pittsburgh Penguins (NHL)
28	D	Brian Rafalski – A	178 cm (5 ft 10 in)	87 kg (192 lb)	28 September 1973	Dearborn, MI	(United States) Detroit Red Wings (NHL)
20	D	Ryan Suter – A	185 cm (6 ft 1 in)	88 kg (194 lb)	21 January 1985	Madison, WI	(United States) Nashville Predators (NHL)
19	D	Ryan Whitney	190 cm (6 ft 3 in)	95 kg (209 lb)	19 February 1983	Scituate, MA	(United States) Anaheim Ducks (NHL)
42	F	David Backes	191 cm (6 ft 3 in)	102 kg (225 lb)	1 May 1984	Blaine, MN	(United States) St. Louis Blues (NHL)
32	F	Dustin Brown – A	183 cm (6 ft 0 in)	94 kg (207 lb)	4 November 1984	Ithaca, NY	(United States) Los Angeles Kings (NHL)
24	F	Ryan Callahan	180 cm (5 ft 11 in)	84 kg (185 lb)	21 March 1985	Rochester, NY	(United States) New York Rangers (NHL)
23	F	Chris Drury	179 cm (5 ft 10 in)	86 kg (190 lb)	20 August 1976	Trumbull, CT	(United States) New York Rangers (NHL)
88	F	Patrick Kane	178 cm (5 ft 10 in)	81 kg (179 lb)	19 November 1988	Buffalo, NY	(United States) Chicago Blackhawks (NHL)
17	F	Ryan Kesler	188 cm (6 ft 2 in)	92 kg (203 lb)	31 August 1984	Livonia, MI	(Canada) Vancouver Canucks (NHL)
81	F	Phil Kessel	180 cm (5 ft 11 in)	82 kg (181 lb)	2 October 1987	Madison, WI	(Canada) Toronto Maple Leafs (NHL)
15	F	Jamie Langenbrunner – C	185 cm (6 ft 1 in)	91 kg (201 lb)	24 July 1975	Cloquet, MN	(United States) New Jersey Devils (NHL)
12	F	Ryan Malone	193 cm (6 ft 4 in)	102 kg (225 lb)	1 December 1979	Pittsburgh, PA	(United States) Tampa Bay Lightning (NHL)
9	F	Zach Parise – A	180 cm (5 ft 11 in)	86 kg (190 lb)	28 July 1984	Prior Lake, MN	(United States) New Jersey Devils (NHL)
16	F	Joe Pavelski	180 cm (5 ft 11 in)	88 kg (194 lb)	11 July 1984	Plover, WI	(United States) San Jose Sharks (NHL)
54	F	Bobby Ryan	188 cm (6 ft 2 in)	97 kg (214 lb)	17 March 1987	Cherry Hill, NJ	(United States) Anaheim Ducks (NHL)
26	F	Paul Stastny	183 cm (6 ft 0 in)	93 kg (205 lb)	27 December 1985	Quebec City, QC, Canada	(United States) Colorado Avalanche (NHL)

Defensemen Paul Martin and Mike Komisarek were initially selected, but due to injuries were replaced by Ryan Whitney and Tim Gleason.

Group play
United States were drawn into Group A.

Team	Pld	W	OTW	OTL	L	GF	GA	GD	Pts	Qualification
United States	3	3	0	0	0	14	5	+9	9	Quarterfinals
Canada	3	1	1	0	1	14	7	+7	5	
Switzerland	3	0	1	1	1	8	10	−2	3	
Norway	3	0	0	1	2	5	19	−14	1	

Source: IIHF

All times are local (UTC-8).

16 February 2010; 12:00	United States	3–1 (1–0, 2–0, 0–1)	Switzerland	Canada Hockey Place, Vancouver; Attendance: 16,706

Game reference

Ryan Miller
Goalies
Jonas Hiller
Referees:
(Russia) Vyacheslav Bulanov
(Canada) Dan O'Halloran
Linesmen:
(Canada) Jean Morin
(Russia) Yuri Oskirko

B. Ryan – 18:59	1–0
D. Backes – 25:52	2–0
R. Malone (R. Suter) (PP) – 28:25	3–0
	3–1	49:45 – R. Wick (H. Domenichelli, M. Streit) (PP)

4 min
Penalties
6 min
24
Shots
15

18 February 2010; 12:00	United States	6–1 (2–0, 1–1, 3–0)	Norway	Canada Hockey Place, Vancouver; Attendance: 16,710

Game reference

Ryan Miller
Goalies
Pål Grotnes
Referees:
(Canada) Marc Joannette
(Canada) Guy Pellerin
Linesmen:
(Czech Republic) Petr Blümel
(Canada) Jean Morin

P. Kessel (J. Pavelski, R. Malone) – 2:39	1–0
C. Drury (R. Callahan, D. Backes) – 13:04	2–0
P. Kane (Z. Parise) – 25:52	3–0
	3–1	28:37 – M. Holtet (SH)
R. Malone (J. Johnson, R. Miller) – 54:19	4–1
B. Rafalski (Z. Parise, P. Kessel) (PP) – 57:00	5–1
B. Rafalski (R. Suter, J. Pavelski) – 59:23	6–1

4 min
Penalties
10 min
39
Shots
11

21 February 2010; 16:40	Canada	3–5 (1–2, 1–1, 1–2)	United States	Canada Hockey Place, Vancouver; Attendance: 16,910

Game reference

Martin Brodeur
Goalies
Ryan Miller
Referees:
(United States) Chris Rooney
(Canada) Brad Watson
Linesmen:
(United States) Thor Nelson
(Canada) Jay Sharrers

	0–1	0:41 – B. Rafalski (R. Suter, J. Langenbrunner)
E. Staal (B. Seabrook, J. Toews) – 8:53	1–1
	1–2	9:15 – B. Rafalski
D. Heatley (J. Toews, S. Weber) – 23:32	2–2
	2–3	36:46 – C. Drury (B. Ryan, D. Backes)
	2–4	47:09 – J. Langenbrunner (B. Rafalski, R. Suter) (PP)
S. Crosby (R. Nash, D. Keith) (PP) – 56:51	3–4
	3–5	59:15 – R. Kesler (Z. Parise) (EN)

8 min
Penalties
6 min
45
Shots
23

The United States was seeded as the top team in the playoff round after finishing with nine points from three regulation wins during the group stage. They were drawn to face the winner of the Switzerland and Belarus qualification playoff, which was won by Switzerland in a shootout.

Quarterfinal

24 February 2010; 12:00	United States	2–0 (0–0, 0–0, 2–0)	Switzerland	Canada Hockey Place, Vancouver; Attendance: 17,536

Game reference
Ryan Miller	Goalies	Jonas Hiller	Referees: (Canada) Paul Devorski (Slovakia) Peter Ország; Linesmen: (United States) Shane Heyer (Germany) Felix Winnekens
Z. Parise (B. Rafalski, P. Stastny) (PP) – 42:08 / 1–0; Z. Parise (EN) – 59:48 / 2–0			Referees: (Canada) Paul Devorski (Slovakia) Peter Ország; Linesmen: (United States) Shane Heyer (Germany) Felix Winnekens
6 min	Penalties	8 min	Referees: (Canada) Paul Devorski (Slovakia) Peter Ország; Linesmen: (United States) Shane Heyer (Germany) Felix Winnekens
44	Shots	19	Referees: (Canada) Paul Devorski (Slovakia) Peter Ország; Linesmen: (United States) Shane Heyer (Germany) Felix Winnekens

Semifinal

26 February 2010; 12:00	United States	6–1 (6–0, 0–0, 0–1)	Finland	Canada Hockey Place, Vancouver; Attendance: 17,602

Game reference

Ryan Miller (out 48:29) / Tim Thomas (in 48:29)
Goalies
Miikka Kiprusoff (out 10:08) / Niklas Bäckström (in 10:08)
Referees:
(Canada) Dan O'Halloran
(Sweden) Marcus Vinnerborg
Linesmen:
(Czech Republic) Petr Blümel
(United States) Shane Heyer

R. Malone – 2:04	1–0
Z. Parise (P. Stastny, B. Rafalski) (PP) – 6:22	2–0
E. Johnson (J. Pavelski, R. Malone) (PP) – 8:36	3–0
P. Kane – 10:08	4–0
P. Kane (B. Rafalski) – 12:31	5–0
P. Stastny (J. Langenbrunner, Z. Parise) – 12:46	6–0
	6–1	54:46 – A. Miettinen (S. Lepistö) (PP)

6 min
Penalties
20 min
25
Shots
25

Gold medal game

28 February 2010; 12:15	(silver) United States	2–3 (OT) (0–1, 1–1, 1–0, 0–1)	Canada (gold)	Canada Hockey Place, Vancouver; Attendance: 17,748

Game reference

Ryan Miller
Goalies
Roberto Luongo
Referees:
(Canada) Bill McCreary
(Canada) Dan O'Halloran
Linesmen:
(Finland) Stefan Fonselius
(Canada) Jean Morin

	0–1	12:50 – J. Toews (M. Richards)
	0–2	27:13 – C. Perry (R. Getzlaf, D. Keith)
R. Kesler (P. Kane) – 32:44	1–2
Z. Parise (J. Langenbrunner, P. Kane) – 59:35	2–2
	2–3	67:40 – S. Crosby (J. Iginla)

4 min
Penalties
4 min
36
Shots
39

=== Women's tournament ===
Roster
The following is the American roster in the women's ice hockey tournament of the 2010 Winter Olympics.

Head coach: (United States) Mark Johnson Assistant coaches: (United States) Dave Flint, (United States) Jodi McKenna

No.	Pos.	Name	Height	Weight	Birthdate	Birthplace	2009–10 team
1	G	Molly Schaus	174 cm (5 ft 9 in)	67 kg (148 lb)	July 29, 1988 (aged 21)	Natick, Massachusetts	Boston College Eagles
2	F	Erika Lawler	152 cm (5 ft 0 in)	59 kg (130 lb)	5 February 1987 (aged 23)	Fitchburg, Massachusetts	Wisconsin Badgers
4	D	Angela Ruggiero – A	175 cm (5 ft 9 in)	87 kg (192 lb)	3 January 1980 (aged 30)	Los Angeles, California	Harvard Crimson
5	F	Karen Thatcher	174 cm (5 ft 9 in)	74 kg (163 lb)	29 February 1984 (aged 25)	Blaine, Washington	Providence Friars
7	F	Monique Lamoureux	168 cm (5 ft 6 in)	71 kg (157 lb)	3 July 1989 (aged 20)	Grand Forks, North Dakota	North Dakota Fighting Sioux
8	D	Caitlin Cahow	163 cm (5 ft 4 in)	71 kg (157 lb)	20 May 1985 (aged 24)	New Haven, Connecticut	Harvard Crimson
9	D	Molly Engstrom	175 cm (5 ft 9 in)	81 kg (179 lb)	1 March 1983 (aged 26)	Siren, Wisconsin	Wisconsin Badgers
10	F	Meghan Duggan	175 cm (5 ft 9 in)	74 kg (163 lb)	3 September 1987 (aged 22)	Danvers, Massachusetts	Wisconsin Badgers
11	D	Lisa Chesson	169 cm (5 ft 7 in)	69 kg (152 lb)	18 August 1986 (aged 23)	Plainfield, Illinois	Ohio State Buckeyes
12	F	Jenny Potter – A	163 cm (5 ft 4 in)	66 kg (146 lb)	12 January 1979 (aged 31)	Edina, Minnesota	Minnesota Golden Gophers
13	F	Julie Chu – A	174 cm (5 ft 9 in)	67 kg (148 lb)	13 March 1982 (aged 27)	Bridgeport, Connecticut	Harvard Crimson
16	F	Kelli Stack	165 cm (5 ft 5 in)	59 kg (130 lb)	13 January 1988 (aged 22)	Brooklyn Heights, Ohio	Boston College Eagles
17	F	Jocelyne Lamoureux	168 cm (5 ft 6 in)	70 kg (150 lb)	3 July 1989 (aged 20)	Grand Forks, North Dakota	North Dakota Fighting Sioux
19	F	Gigi Marvin	174 cm (5 ft 9 in)	75 kg (165 lb)	7 March 1987 (aged 22)	Warroad, Minnesota	Minnesota Golden Gophers
20	F	Natalie Darwitz – C	160 cm (5 ft 3 in)	62 kg (137 lb)	13 October 1983 (aged 26)	Eagan, Minnesota	Minnesota Golden Gophers
21	F	Hilary Knight	178 cm (5 ft 10 in)	78 kg (172 lb)	12 July 1989 (aged 20)	Hanover, New Hampshire	Wisconsin Badgers
22	D	Kacey Bellamy	174 cm (5 ft 9 in)	65 kg (143 lb)	22 April 1987 (aged 22)	Westfield, Massachusetts	New Hampshire Wildcats
23	D	Kerry Weiland	163 cm (5 ft 4 in)	64 kg (141 lb)	18 October 1980 (aged 29)	Palmer, Alaska	Wisconsin Badgers
27	F	Jinelle Zaugg-Siergiej	183 cm (6 ft 0 in)	82 kg (181 lb)	27 March 1986 (aged 23)	Eagle River, Wisconsin	Wisconsin Badgers
29	G	Brianne McLaughlin	174 cm (5 ft 9 in)	59 kg (130 lb)	20 June 1987 (aged 22)	Sheffield, Ohio	Robert Morris Colonials
31	G	Jessie Vetter	174 cm (5 ft 9 in)	77 kg (170 lb)	19 December 1985 (aged 24)	Cottage Grove, Wisconsin	Wisconsin Badgers

Group play
The United States played in Group B.

Team	Pld	W	OTW	OTL	L	GF	GA	GD	Pts	Qualification
United States	3	3	0	0	0	31	1	+30	9	Semifinals
Finland	3	2	0	0	1	7	8	−1	6	Semifinals
Russia	3	1	0	0	2	3	19	−16	3	5–8th classification
China	3	0	0	0	3	3	16	−13	0	5–8th classification

Source: ESPN

All times are local (UTC-8).

14 February 2010; 12:00	United States	12–1 (5–0, 3–0, 4–1)	China	UBC Winter Sports Centre, Vancouver; Attendance: 5,278

Game reference

Molly Schaus (out 52:00) / Brianne McLaughlin (in 52:00)
Goalies
Shi Yao
Referee:
Ulla Sipilä (Finland)

Ruggiero – 2:50	1–0
Stack (Chu) – 9:56	2–0
Potter (M. Lamoureux) – 14:22	3–0
Duggan (Stack, Darwitz) (PP) – 17:40	4–0
Potter (Knight, M. Lamoureux) – 18:01	5–0
Potter (Engstrom, Chesson) (PP) – 21:18	6–0
Chesson (Marvin, Chu) – 23:46	7–0
J. Lamoureux (Thatcher) – 39:39	8–0
Duggan (Marvin, Potter) – 43:59	9–0
Engstrom (Potter, M. Lamoureux) – 50:43	10–0
Darwitz (M. Lamoureux, Weiland) – 54:43	11–0
	11–1	57:39 – Jin (Ma, Sun) (PP)
Chu (Darwitz) – 59:21	12–1

8 min
Penalties
12 min
61
Shots
7

16 February 2010; 14:30	Russia	0–13 (0–5, 0–7, 0–1)	United States	UBC Winter Sports Centre, Vancouver; Attendance: 5,365

Game reference

Anna Prugova (out 31:00)
Mariya Onolbayeva (in 31:00)
Goalies
Jessie Vetter
Referee:
Nicole Hertrich (Germany)
Linesmen:
Annica Flöden (Sweden)
Heather Richardson (Canada)

0–1	2:19 – M. Lamoureux (J. Lamoureux, Stack)
0–2	5:48 – Potter (Knight) (SH)
0–3	9:54 – Thatcher (Potter, Knight)
0–4	12:57 – Cahow (Stack, Darwitz) (PP)
0–5	15:56 – Potter (Knight) (PP)
0–6	20:34 – Ruggiero (Chu, Darwitz) (PP)
0–7	23:16 – Stack (M. Lamoureux) (PP)
0–8	26:01 – J. Lamoureux (Darwitz)
0–9	27:50 – Darwitz (Cahow) (PP)
0–10	31:00 – Darwitz (Knight) (SH)
0–11	31:46 – Potter (Thatcher, Bellamy)
0–12	33:32 – Engstrom (Chesson) (PP)
0–13	41:05 – Chesson (Stack) (PP)

16 min
Penalties
10 min
7
Shots
34

18 February 2010; 14:30	United States	6–0 (4–0, 1–0, 1–0)	Finland	UBC Winter Sports Centre, Vancouver; Attendance: 5,398

Game reference

Jessie Vetter
Goalies
Noora Räty
Referee:
Aina Høve (Norway)

Chu (Ruggiero) – 8:08	1–0
Engstrom (M. Lamoureux) (PP) – 10:47	2–0
Duggan (Darwitz, Marvin) – 11:29	3–0
Darwitz (Engstrom, Chesson) – 18:03	4–0
Knight (Darwitz) – 31:48	5–0
Thatcher (J. Lamoureux, Ruggiero) – 58:22	6–0

12 min
Penalties
6 min
42
Shots
23

Semifinal

22 February 2010; 12:00	Sweden	1–9 (0–2, 1–3, 0–4)	United States	Canada Hockey Place, Vancouver; Attendance: 16,021

Game reference

Kim Martin
Goalies
Jessie Vetter
Referee:
Mary Anne Gage (Canada)

	0–1	7:14 – M. Lamoureux (Potter, Knight)
	0–2	8:23 – Duggan (Cahow, Stack) (PP)
	0–3	23:22 – Ruggiero (J. Lamoureux)
	0–4	25:58 – Cahow (Thatcher)
Winberg (Jordansson) (PP) – 29:34	1–4
	1–5	33:35 – Thatcher (J. Lamoureux, Lawler)
	1–6	45:59 – M. Lamoureux (Potter, Engstrom) (PP)
	1–7	47:15 – Weiland (Lawler)
	1–8	55:20 – Stack (Chu, Engstrom)
	1–9	57:19 – M. Lamoureux (Knight) (PP)

10 min
Penalties
8 min
12
Shots
46

Gold medal game

25 February 2010; 15:30	(gold) Canada	2–0 (2–0, 0–0, 0–0)	United States (silver)	Canada Hockey Place, Vancouver; Attendance: 16,805

Game reference
Shannon Szabados	Goalies	Jessie Vetter	Referee: Aina Høve (Norway)
Poulin (Botterill) – 13:55 / 1–0; Poulin (Agosta) – 16:50 / 2–0			Referee: Aina Høve (Norway)
12 min	Penalties	10 min	Referee: Aina Høve (Norway)
18	Shots	21	Referee: Aina Høve (Norway)

== Luge ==
On December 16, 2009, the U.S. Olympic Luge team was announced. The team was formally announced in New York on December 18, 2009, on The Today Show. Honorary team captains were Eric Mabius of ABC's Ugly Betty television series and astronaut Scott Parazynski who were both lugers in the 1980s.

Men

Athlete	Event	Run 1		Run 2		Run 3		Run 4		Total	
Athlete	Event	Time	Rank	Time	Rank	Time	Rank	Time	Rank	Time	Rank
Tony Benshoof	Singles	48.657	7	48.747	7	49.010	8	48.714	11	3:15.128	8
Chris Mazdzer	Singles	48.811	12	48.963	16	49.223	13	48.816	17	3:15.813	13
Bengt Walden	Singles	49.002	20	48.865	14	49.323	19	48.794	15	3:15.984	15
Mark Grimmette; Brian Martin	Doubles	41.821	11	42.184	16	—N/a				1:24.005	13
Dan Joye; Christian Niccum	Doubles	41.602	6	41.689	6	—N/a				1:23.291	6

Women

Athlete	Event	Run 1		Run 2		Run 3		Run 4		Total	
Athlete	Event	Time	Rank	Time	Rank	Time	Rank	Time	Rank	Time	Rank
Julia Clukey	Singles	42.059	15	42.075	15	42.472	16	42.754	25	2:49.360	17
Erin Hamlin	Singles	41.835	8	42.219	20	42.792	24	42.262	16	2:49.108	16
Megan Sweeney	Singles	42.450	22	42.960	27	42.625	22	42.450	20	2:50.215	22

== Nordic combined ==
The team was announced on January 21, 2010.

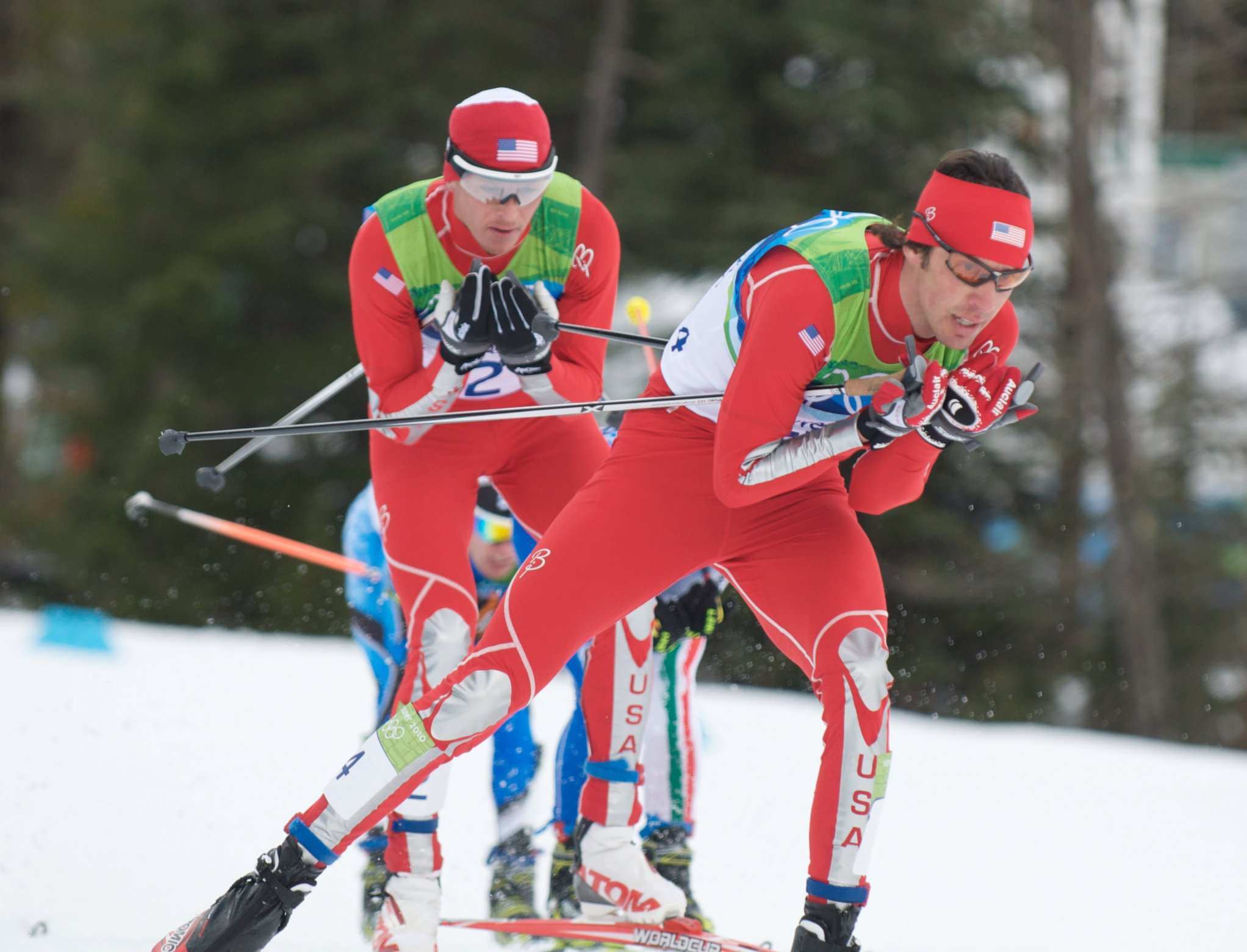
Johnny Spillane (leading) and Todd Lodwick during the individual normal hill/10 km event.

Athlete	Event	Ski jumping			Cross-country	Total	
Athlete	Event	Distance	Points	Rank	Time	Time	Rank
Brett Camerota	Normal hill/10 km	100.0	121.5	10	27:00.6	27:56.6	36
Bill Demong	Normal hill/10 km	96.5	115.5	24	24:45.0	26:05.0	6
Todd Lodwick	Normal hill/10 km	101.5	127.0	2	25:14.6	25:48.6	4
Johnny Spillane	Normal hill/10 km	100.5	124.5	4	25:03.5	25:47.5	2nd place, silver medalist(s)
Bill Demong	Large hill/10 km	127.0	115.5	6	24:46.9	25:32.9	1st place, gold medalist(s)
Taylor Fletcher	Large hill/10 km	82.0	38.0	46	26:17.5	31.73.5	45
Todd Lodwick	Large hill/10 km	122.5	108.7	13	25:30.2	26.43.2	13
Johnny Spillane	Large hill/10 km	129.0	118.5	2	25:02.9	25:36.9	2nd place, silver medalist(s)
Brett Camerota; Bill Demong; Todd Lodwick; Johnny Spillane	Team large hill/4 x 5 km	538.5	505.8	2	49:34.8	49:36.8	2nd place, silver medalist(s)

== Short track speed skating ==
The men's and women's short track speed skating team was determined after the Olympic Trials, held September 9–13, 2009, in Marquette, Michigan. Combination of their overall ranking and individual event finishes is what was used to determine the Olympic team.

Men

Athlete	Event	Heat		Quarterfinal		Semifinal		Final	
Athlete	Event	Time	Position	Time	Position	Time	Position	Time	Position
Simon Cho	500 m	41.726	2 Q	41.211	3	Did not advance			
Jordan Malone	500 m	1:03.884	4	Did not advance					
Apolo Ohno	500 m	41.665	1 Q	42.004	2 Q	41.460	1 Q	DSQ	
J. R. Celski	1000 m	1:25.113	2 Q	1:24.621	2 Q	DSQ		Did not advance	
Travis Jayner	1000 m	1:26.870	3	Did not advance					
Apolo Ohno	1000 m	1:25.940	1 Q	1:25.502	2 Q	1:25.033	1 Q	1:24.128	3rd place, bronze medalist(s)
J. R. Celski	1500 m	2:12.460	3 Q	—N/a		2:13.606	2 Q	2:18.053	3rd place, bronze medalist(s)
Jordan Malone	1500 m	DSQ		—N/a		did not advance			
Apolo Ohno	1500 m	2:17.653	1 Q	—N/a		2:11.072	2 Q	2:17.976	2nd place, silver medalist(s)
J. R. Celski; Simon Cho; Travis Jayner; Apolo Ohno	5000 m relay	—N/a				6:46.369	2 Q	6:44.498	3rd place, bronze medalist(s)

Women

*-Indicates athlete skated in a preliminary round but not the final.
Athlete	Event	Heat		Quarterfinal		Semifinal		Final	
Athlete	Event	Time	Position	Time	Position	Time	Position	Time	Position
Alyson Dudek	500 m	44.560	2 Q	44.588	4	Did not advance			
Katherine Reutter	500 m	44.187	1 Q	43.834	1 Q	44.145	4	Consolation final 44.846	7
Allison Baver	1000 m	DSQ		Did not advance					
Kimberly Derrick	1000 m	1:31.663	3	Did not advance					
Katherine Reutter	1000 m	1:30.508 OR	1 Q	1:29.955	1 Q	1:30.568	1 Q	1:29.324	2nd place, silver medalist(s)
Allison Baver	1500 m	2:44.915	4 q	—N/a		2:25.053	5	Did not advance	
Kimberly Derrick	1500 m	2:24.375	4	—N/a		Did not advance			
Katherine Reutter	1500 m	2:29.316	2 Q	—N/a		2:37.060	4 q	2:18.396	4
Allison Baver; Kimberly Derrick*; Alyson Dudek; Lana Gehring; Katherine Reutter	3000 m relay	—N/a				4:15.376	2 Q	4:14.081	3rd place, bronze medalist(s)

== Skeleton ==
The U.S. Olympic skeleton team was finalized after the completion of the seventh World Cup race. Based on race rankings through January 17, 2010.

Athlete	Event	Run 1		Run 2		Run 3		Run 4		Total	
Athlete	Event	Time	Rank	Time	Rank	Time	Rank	Time	Rank	Time	Rank
Eric Bernotas	Men	53.23	14	53.55	15	53.33	17	53.16	13	3:33.27	14
John Daly	Men	54.08	21	53.65	16	53.23	15	53.05	12	3:34.01	17
Zach Lund	Men	53.04	10	52.85	3	52.57	5	52.81	8	3:31.27	5
Noelle Pikus-Pace	Women	54.30	7	54.21	4	53.88	3	54.07	6	3:36.46	4
Katie Uhlaender	Women	54.51	8	54.53	9	54.54	11	54.35	9	3:37.93	11

== Ski jumping ==
The United States ski team announced the 2010 Olympic ski jumping team on January 20, 2010.

Athlete	Event	Qualifying			1st round			Final		
Athlete	Event	Distance	Points	Rank	Distance	Points	Rank	Distance	Points	Rank
Nick Alexander	Normal hill	96.0	113.0	35 Q	93.5	106.5	41	Did not advance		
Peter Frenette	Normal hill	97.0	115.0	30 Q	93.0	106.5	41	Did not advance		
Anders Johnson	Normal hill	93.5	108.5	40 Q	86.5	92.5	49	Did not advance		
Nick Alexander	Large hill	127.5	116.5	28 Q	109.0	79.2	40	Did not advance		
Peter Frenette	Large hill	126.0	113.8	30 Q	114.5	90.6	32	Did not advance		
Anders Johnson	Large hill	117.0	95.6	42	Did not advance					
Nick Alexander; Taylor Fletcher; Peter Frenette; Anders Johnson	Team large hill	—N/a			447.5	340.0	11	Did not advance		

== Snowboarding ==
The United States Olympic snowboard team was announced on January 26, 2010.

Freestyle
Men

Athlete	Event	Qualification			Semifinal			Final		
Athlete	Event	Run 1	Run 2	Rank	Run 1	Run 2	Rank	Run 1	Run 2	Rank
Greg Bretz	Halfpipe	36.2	41.3	4 Q	42.1	38.0	2 Q	18.3	13.0	12
Scotty Lago	Halfpipe	39.0	28.4	6 Q	41.3	16.2	3 Q	42.8	17.5	3rd place, bronze medalist(s)
Louie Vito	Halfpipe	26.1	41.8	3 QF	Bye			39.1	39.4	5
Shaun White	Halfpipe	45.8	10.8	1 QF	Bye			46.8	48.4	1st place, gold medalist(s)

Women

Athlete	Event	Qualification			Semifinal			Final		
Athlete	Event	Run 1	Run 2	Rank	Run 1	Run 2	Rank	Run 1	Run 2	Rank
Gretchen Bleiler	Halfpipe	36.6	40.2	5 QF	Bye			11.0	14.7	11
Kelly Clark	Halfpipe	45.4	13.6	2 QF	Bye			25.6	42.2	3rd place, bronze medalist(s)
Elena Hight	Halfpipe	35.7	37.9	8 Q	37.1	10.8	4 Q	24.6	16.0	10
Hannah Teter	Halfpipe	39.7	42.7	4 QF	Bye			42.4	39.2	2nd place, silver medalist(s)

Parallel

Athlete	Event	Qualification		1/8 final	Quarterfinal	Semifinal	Final	
Athlete	Event	Time	Rank	Opposition margin	Opposition margin	Opposition margin	Opposition margin	Rank
Tyler Jewell	Men's giant slalom	1:17.85	7 Q	Jasey-Jay Anderson (CAN); L +1.18	Did not advance			
Chris Klug	Men's giant slalom	1:18.84	16 Q	Andreas Prommegger (AUT); W −0.25	Mathieu Bozzetto (FRA); L DNF	Consolation round Zan Kosir (SLO); L +1.71	Consolation round Rok Flander (SLO); W opponent DNS	7
Michelle Gorgone	Women's giant slalom	1:24.63	13 Q	Ekaterina Ilyukhina (RUS); L +0.21	Did not advance			

Snowboard cross
Men

Athlete	Event	Qualification		1/8 final	Quarterfinal	Semifinal	Final	
Athlete	Event	Time	Rank	Position	Position	Position	Position	Rank
Nick Baumgartner	Snowboard cross	1:21.70	13 Q	4	Did not advance			
Nate Holland	Snowboard cross	1:21.78	15 Q	1 Q	2 Q	1 Q	4	4
Graham Watanabe	Snowboard cross	1:20.53	2 Q	3	Did not advance			
Seth Wescott	Snowboard cross	1:22.87	17 Q	1 Q	1 Q	2 Q	1	1st place, gold medalist(s)

Women

Athlete	Event	Qualification		Quarterfinal	Semifinal	Final	
Athlete	Event	Time	Rank	Position	Position	Position	Rank
Callan Chythlook-Sifsof	Snowboard cross	1:59.04	21	did not advance			
Faye Gulini	Snowboard cross	1:30.75	12 Q	3	Did not advance		
Lindsey Jacobellis	Snowboard cross	1:25.41	2 Q	1 Q	4	Consolation final 1	5

== Speed skating ==
The United States men's and women's speed skating team was announced on December 31, 2009.

Distance
Men

Athlete	Event	Race 1		Race 2		Total	
Athlete	Event	Time	Rank	Time	Rank	Time	Rank
Shani Davis	500 m	35.450	18	DNS			
Tucker Fredricks	500 m	35.218	15	35.138	9	1:10.356	12
Nick Pearson	500 m	35.834	25	36.094	28	1:11.928	26
Mitchell Whitmore	500 m	36.734	39	36.314	34	1:13.048	37
Shani Davis	1000 m	—N/a				1:08.94	1st place, gold medalist(s)
Chad Hedrick	1000 m	—N/a				1:09.32	3rd place, bronze medalist(s)
Trevor Marsicano	1000 m	—N/a				1:10.11	10
Nick Pearson	1000 m	—N/a				1:09.79	7
Shani Davis	1500 m	—N/a				1:46.10	2nd place, silver medalist(s)
Brian Hansen	1500 m	—N/a				1:48.45	18
Chad Hedrick	1500 m	—N/a				1:46.69	6
Trevor Marsicano	1500 m	—N/a				1:47.84	15
Chad Hedrick	5000 m	—N/a				6:27.07	11
Shani Davis	5000 m	—N/a				6:28.44	12
Trevor Marsicano	5000 m	—N/a				6:30.93	14
Ryan Bedford	10000 m	—N/a				13:40.20	12
Jonathan Kuck	10000 m	—N/a				13:31.78	8

Women

Athlete	Event	Race 1		Race 2		Total	
Athlete	Event	Time	Rank	Time	Rank	Time	Rank
Lauren Cholewinski	500 m	39.514	29	39.587	32	1:19.101	30
Elli Ochowicz	500 m	39.002	18	39.048	19	1:18.050	17
Heather Richardson	500 m	38.698	9	38.477	6	1:17.175	6
Jennifer Rodriguez	500 m	39.182	20	39.281	24	1:18.463	21
Rebekah Bradford	1000 m	—N/a				1:18.788	29
Elli Ochowicz	1000 m	—N/a				1:18.330	26
Heather Richardson	1000 m	—N/a				1:17.370	9
Jennifer Rodriguez	1000 m	—N/a				1:17.080	7
Heather Richardson	1500 m	—N/a				1:59.56	16
Jennifer Rodriguez	1500 m	—N/a				2:00.08	18
Jilleanne Rookard	1500 m	—N/a				2:01.95	24
Catherine Raney-Norman	1500 m	—N/a				2:03.02	31
Catherine Raney-Norman	3000 m	—N/a				4:16.95	17
Jilleanne Rookard	3000 m	—N/a				4:13.05	12
Nancy Swider-Peltz Jr.	3000 m	—N/a				4:11.16	9
Maria Lamb	5000 m	—N/a				7:25.15	15
Jilleanne Rookard	5000 m	—N/a				7:07.48	8

Team pursuit

Athletes	Event	Quarterfinal	Semifinal	Final	
Athletes	Event	Opposition time	Opposition time	Opposition time	Rank
Brian Hansen; Chad Hedrick; Jonathan Kuck; Trevor Marsicano	Men's team pursuit	Japan; W 3:44.25	Netherlands; W 3:42.71	Canada; L 3:41.58	2nd place, silver medalist(s)
Catherine Raney-Norman; Jennifer Rodriguez; Jilleanne Rookard; Nancy Swider-Peltz Jr.	Women's team pursuit	Canada; W 3:02.19	Germany; L 3:03.78	Poland; L 3:05.29	4

== See also ==
- United States at the 2010 Winter Paralympics
- United States at the 2010 Summer Youth Olympics
