= Slivets =

Slivets is an East-Slavic surname. Polish counterpart: Śliwiec. Notable people with the surname include:

- Assol Slivets (born 1982), Belarusian skier
- Timofei Slivets (born 1984), Belarusian skier
