= Freestyle skiing at the 2010 Winter Olympics – Men's aerials =

Men's aerials at the XXI Olympic Winter Games
- Venue: Cypress Bowl Ski Area in Cypress Provincial Park, West Vancouver, British Columbia, Canada
- Dates: 22 February 2010 (qualifying round); 25 February 2010 (final)
- Competitors: 24 from 8 nations
- Winning score: 248.41

Medalists
1st place, gold medalist(s)		Alexei Grishin	Belarus
2nd place, silver medalist(s)		Jeret Peterson	United States
3rd place, bronze medalist(s)		Liu Zhongqing	China

The men's aerials event in freestyle skiing at the 2010 Winter Olympics in Vancouver, Canada took place on 22 February for the qualification round. The final was held on 25 February. Both events were held at the Cypress Bowl Ski Area in Cypress Provincial Park, West Vancouver, British Columbia.

== Results ==
=== Qualification ===
The qualification was held on 22 February at 18:00.

Rank	Bib	Name	Country	Jump 1	Rank	Jump 2	Rank	Total	Note
1	3	Jia Zongyang	China	120.80	7	121.72	3	242.52	Q
2	28	Ryan St. Onge	United States	122.57	6	118.10	6	240.67	Q
3	18	Thomas Lambert	Switzerland	114.58	11	123.75	1	238.33	Q
4	17	Dmitri Dashinski	Belarus	115.93	10	122.40	2	238.33	Q
5	13	Jeret Peterson	United States	119.47	8	117.87	7	237.34	Q
6	8	Warren Shouldice	Canada	122.79	5	113.14	10	235.93	Q
7	10	Aleksei Grishin	Belarus	123.01	4	111.26	12	234.27	Q
8	9	Steve Omischl	Canada	116.15	9	117.73	8	233.88	Q
9	11	Kyle Nissen	Canada	123.75	3	109.96	14	233.71	Q
10	2	Qi Guangpu	China	108.60	14	121.68	4	230.28	Q
11	6	Liu Zhongqing	China	124.78	2	104.89	17	229.67	Q
12	5	Timofei Slivets	Belarus	110.63	13	111.28	11	221.91	Q
13	15	David Morris	Australia	105.09	16	115.93	9	221.02	
14	22	Andreas Isoz	Switzerland	103.76	17	110.42	13	214.18	
15	1	Anton Kushnir	Belarus	125.89	1	88.01	21	213.90	
16	19	Christian Haechler	Switzerland	106.64	15	100.61	20	207.25	
17	32	Matt DePeters	United States	101.84	18	100.64	19	202.48	
18	4	Renato Ulrich	Switzerland	81.86	23	118.55	5	200.41	
19	20	Stanislav Kravchuk	Ukraine	90.93	19	106.46	15	197.39	
20	24	Dmitry Marushchak	Russia	88.50	20	106.46	15	194.96	
21	23	Han Xiaopeng	China	111.95	12	80.57	24	192.52	
22	29	Enver Ablaev	Ukraine	88.08	21	101.33	12	189.41	
23	31	Scotty Bahrke	United States	82.52	22	86.20	22	168.72	
24	30	Oleksandr Abramenko	Ukraine	80.53	24	82.03	23	162.56	
	27	Yury Shapkin	Russia	Did Not Start					

=== Final ===
The final was held on 25 February 2010 at 18:00.

Rank	Bib	Name	Country	Jump 1	Rank	Jump 2	Rank	Total
1st place, gold medalist(s)	10	Aleksei Grishin	Belarus	120.58	2	127.83	4	248.41
2nd place, silver medalist(s)	13	Jeret Peterson	United States	118.59	5	128.62	3	247.21
3rd place, bronze medalist(s)	6	Liu Zhongqing	China	119.91	3	122.62	6	242.53
4	28	Ryan St. Onge	United States	115.27	8	124.66	5	239.93
5	11	Kyle Nissen	Canada	126.92	1	112.39	11	239.31
6	3	Jia Zongyang	China	119.47	4	118.10	9	237.57
7	2	Qi Guangpu	China	115.38	7	119.47	8	234.85
8	9	Steve Omischl	Canada	112.39	9	121.27	7	233.66
9	5	Timofei Slivets	Belarus	115.84	6	109.74	12	225.58
10	8	Warren Shouldice	Canada	94.03	10	129.27	1	223.30
11	17	Dmitri Dashinski	Belarus	86.95	12	128.73	2	215.68
12	18	Thomas Lambert	Switzerland	93.66	11	117.24	10	210.90
