= Maxime Gingras =

Maxime Gingras may refer to:

- Maxime Gingras (ice hockey) (born 1978), Canadian ice hockey goaltender
- Maxime Gingras (skier) (born 1984), retired Canadian freestyle skier
