= Freestyle skiing at the 2010 Winter Olympics – Men's moguls =

Men's moguls at the XXI Olympic Winter Games
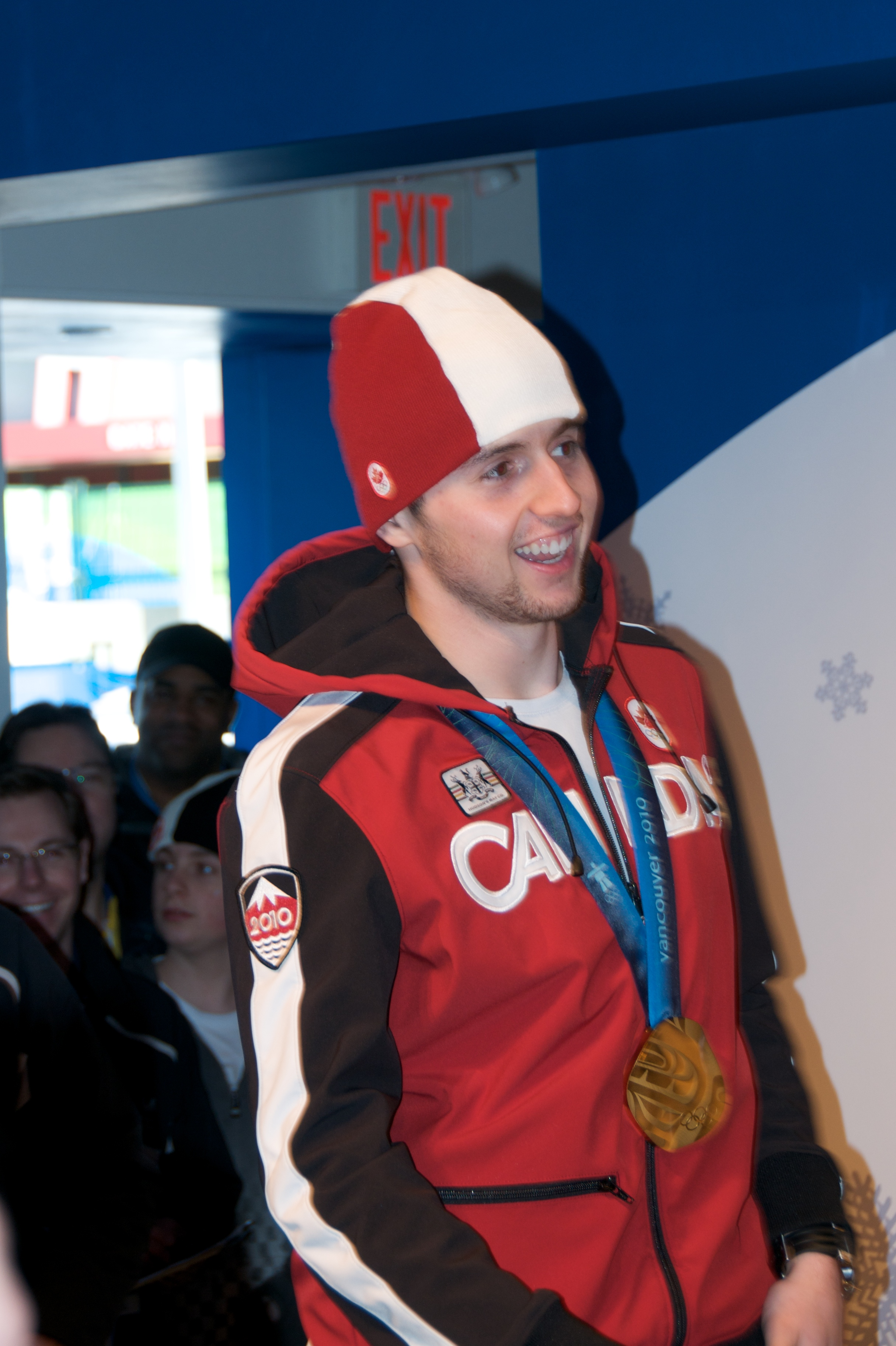
- Gold medalist Alexandre Bilodeau
- Venue: Cypress Bowl Ski Area
- Dates: 14 February
- Competitors: 30 from 10 nations
- Winning Score: 26.75

Medalists
1st place, gold medalist(s)		Alexandre Bilodeau	Canada
2nd place, silver medalist(s)		Dale Begg-Smith	Australia
3rd place, bronze medalist(s)		Bryon Wilson	United States

The men's moguls event in freestyle skiing at the 2010 Winter Olympics in Vancouver, Canada took place on February 14 at Cypress Bowl Ski Area. This event produced the first gold medal for Canada as an Olympic host country and the first silver medal for Australia in Winter Olympic competition.

== Results ==
=== Qualification ===
The qualification was held at 14:30.

Rank	Bib	Name	Country	Time	Score			Total	Notes
Rank	Bib	Name	Country	Time	Turns	Air	Time	Total	Notes
1	3	Guilbaut Colas	France	23.35	13.7	5.11	7.12	25.93	Q
2	4	Alexandre Bilodeau	Canada	24.22	13.5	5.26	6.72	25.48	Q
3	5	Bryon Wilson	United States	24.01	13.3	4.95	6.81	25.06	Q
4	1	Dale Begg-Smith	Australia	24.65	13.6	4.91	6.52	25.03	Q
5	2	Jesper Björnlund	Sweden	25.04	13.2	5.00	6.33	24.53	Q
6	10	Maxime Gingras	Canada	24.06	12.7	4.88	6.79	24.37	Q
7	17	Pierre-Alexandre Rousseau	Canada	24.25	12.9	4.76	6.70	24.36	Q
8	26	Sho Endo	Japan	24.69	12.8	5.06	6.50	24.36	Q
9	7	Dmitriy Reiherd	Kazakhstan	24.78	12.8	5.00	6.46	24.26	Q
10	14	Patrick Deneen	United States	24.39	13.2	4.13	6.64	23.97	Q
11	20	Yugo Tsukita	Japan	25.34	13.0	4.60	6.20	23.80	Q
12	22	Arttu Kiramo	Finland	25.00	13.0	4.43	6.35	23.78	Q
13	9	Vincent Marquis	Canada	24.28	12.5	4.52	6.69	23.71	Q
14	8	Alexandr Smyshlyaev	Russia	25.43	12.8	4.70	6.15	23.65	Q
15	11	Nobuyuki Nishi	Japan	25.74	12.9	4.61	6.01	23.52	Q
16	21	Nathan Roberts	United States	24.23	12.4	4.11	6.71	23.22	Q
17	23	Pierre Ochs	France	23.85	11.9	4.40	6.89	23.19	Q
18	12	Denis Dolgodvorov	Russia	25.38	12.1	4.81	6.18	23.09	Q
19	6	Michael Morse	United States	26.06	12.8	4.42	5.86	23.08	Q
20	31	Mikko Ronkainen	Finland	24.95	12.6	4.02	6.38	23.00	Q
21	27	Tapio Luusua	Finland	25.57	13.0	3.74	6.09	22.83	
22	28	Arnaud Burille	France	24.50	11.8	4.19	6.59	22.58	
23	19	Per Spett	Sweden	27.27	12.4	4.40	5.30	22.10	
24	16	Kai Ozaki	Japan	23.34	11.0	3.94	7.13	22.07	
25	25	Andrey Volkov	Russia	25.28	11.4	4.33	6.22	21.95	
26	32	Lukas Vaculik	Czech Republic	25.73	12.0	3.77	6.01	21.78	
27	29	Ramone Cooper	Australia	26.78	11.4	4.19	5.52	21.11	
28	30	Sergey Volkov	Russia	29.25	5.6	2.25	4.37	12.22	
29	33	Dmitriy Barmashov	Kazakhstan	28.45	4.1	2.71	4.75	11.56	
30	15	Anthony Benna	France	RNS					

=== Final ===
The final was held at 17:30.

Rank	Bib	Name	Country	Time	Score			Total	Notes
Rank	Bib	Name	Country	Time	Turns	Air	Time	Total	Notes
1st place, gold medalist(s)	4	Alexandre Bilodeau	Canada	23.17	14.1	5.44	7.21	26.75	
2nd place, silver medalist(s)	1	Dale Begg-Smith	Australia	23.72	14.2	5.43	6.95	26.58	
3rd place, bronze medalist(s)	5	Bryon Wilson	United States	24.00	13.8	5.46	6.82	26.08	
4	9	Vincent Marquis	Canada	23.10	13.6	5.04	7.24	25.88	
5	17	Pierre-Alexandre Rousseau	Canada	25.83	13.9	5.05	6.88	25.83	
6	3	Guilbaut Colas	France	22.90	13.9	4.51	7.33	25.74	
7	26	Sho Endo	Japan	23.52	13.1	5.24	7.04	25.38	
8	2	Jesper Björnlund	Sweden	24.33	13.5	4.95	6.67	25.12	
9	11	Nobuyuki Nishi	Japan	23.92	13.4	4.85	6.86	25.11	
10	8	Alexandr Smyshlyaev	Russia	23.75	13.2	4.24	6.94	24.38	
11	10	Maxime Gingras	Canada	23.40	12.0	5.03	7.10	24.13	
12	23	Pierre Ochs	France	24.96	12.9	4.35	6.37	23.62	
13	12	Denis Dolgodvorov	Russia	25.53	12.5	4.98	6.11	23.59	
14	31	Mikko Ronkainen	Finland	24.59	12.8	4.16	6.54	23.50	
15	6	Michael Morse	United States	24.45	12.3	4.47	6.61	23.38	
16	22	Arttu Kiramo	Finland	23.92	11.8	4.10	6.86	22.76	
17	20	Yugo Tsukita	Japan	24.98	12.0	4.38	6.36	22.74	
18	7	Dmitriy Reiherd	Kazakhstan	25.28	10.3	2.71	6.22	19.23	
19	14	Patrick Deneen	United States	RNS					
19	21	Nathan Roberts	United States	RNS					

RNS = Run Not Scored
