= Andreas Isoz =

Swiss freestyle skier

Personal information
- Born: 17 February 1984 (age 42) Zurich, Switzerland

Sport
- Sport: Skiing
- Updated on March 28, 2013

Andreas Isoz (born 17 February 1984 in Zurich) is a Swiss freestyle skier, specializing in aerials.

Isoz competed at the 2010 Winter Olympics for Switzerland. He placed 14th in the qualifying round of the aerials event, failing to advance to the final.

As of March 2013, his best showing at the World Championships is 5th, in the 2007.

Isoz made his World Cup debut in March 2000. As of March 2013, his best World Cup event finish is 4th, achieved three times. His best World Cup overall finish in aerials is 8th, in 2007/08.
