= Yury Shapkin =

Russian freestyle skier

Personal information
- Born: 1 June 1987 (age 39) Moscow, Russian SFSR, Soviet Union

Sport
- Sport: Skiing
- Updated on 28 March 2013

Yury Shapkin (born 1 June 1987) is a Russian freestyle skier, specializing in aerials.

Shapkin was entered at the 2010 Winter Olympics for Russia, but pulled out before the qualifying round of the aerials event.

Shapkin made his World Cup debut in December 2007. As of March 2013, his best finish in a World Cup event is 13th, at a 2009/10 at Calgary. His best World Cup overall finish in aerials is 26th, in 2007/08.
