= Jeret Peterson =

American aerial skier

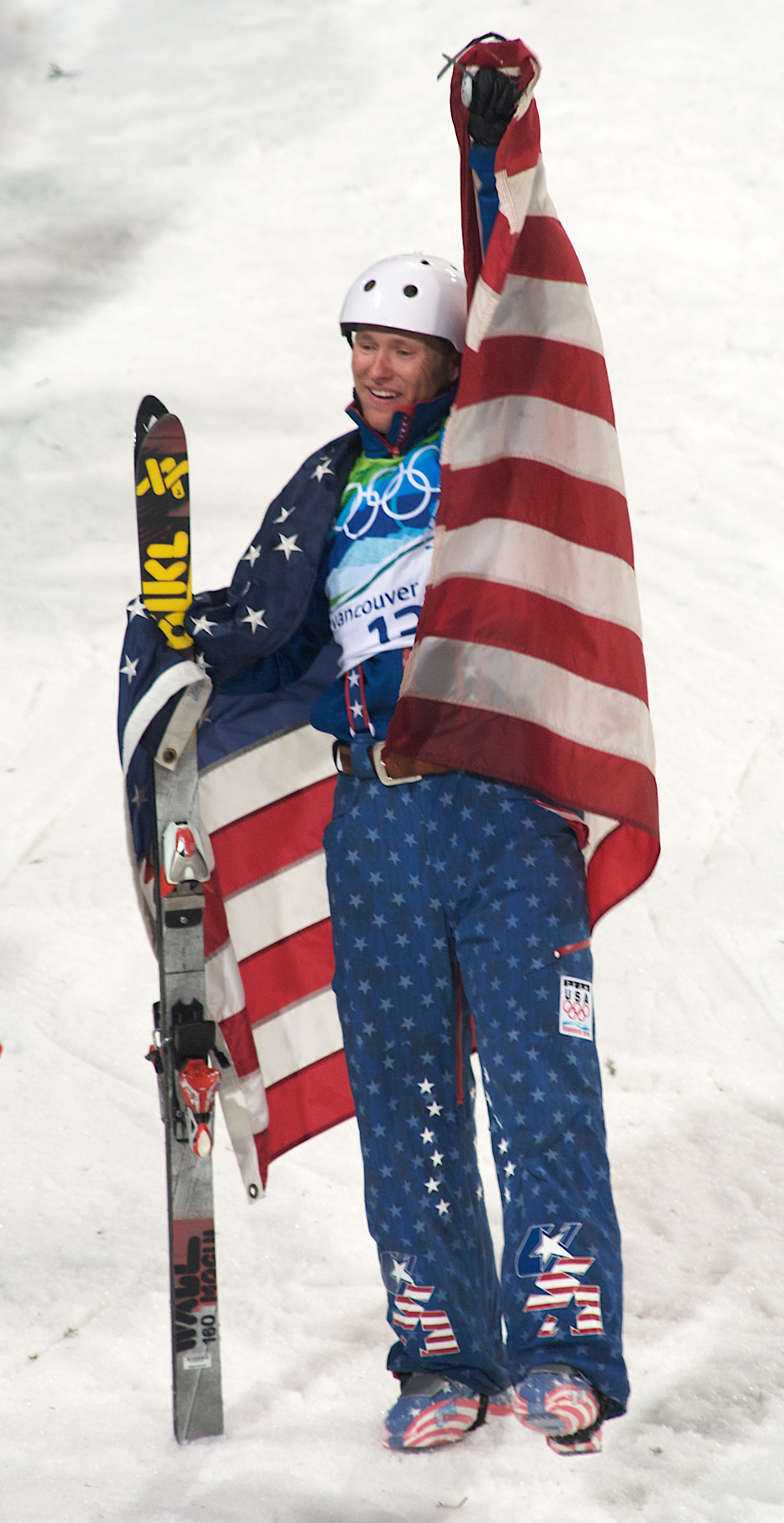

Personal information
- Nickname: Speedy
- Nationality: American
- Born: December 12, 1981 Boise, Idaho
- Died: July 25, 2011 (aged 29) Lambs Canyon, Utah

Sport
- Country: United States
- Sport: Freestyle Skiing
- Event: Men's aerials
Medal record
Men's freestyle skiing
Representing the United States
Olympic Games
Silver medal – second place	2010 Vancouver	Aerials

Jeret "Speedy" Peterson (December 12, 1981 – July 25, 2011) was an American World Cup aerial skier from Boise, Idaho, skiing out of Bogus Basin. A three-time Olympian, he won the silver medal at the 2010 Winter Olympics in Vancouver. Peterson was found dead by suicide in Lambs Canyon, a remote canyon between Salt Lake City and Park City, Utah on July 25, 2011. The cause of death was determined to be a self-inflicted gunshot wound.

== Athletic career ==
Through the 2006 season, Peterson had won four World Cup events in aerials, and a total of nine World Cup podiums. His best season was 2005, with three World Cup wins and three seconds. With the help of these six strong placings, he took the 2005 World Cup season title in aerials. He finished in sixth place for the 2006 season.

A member of three Olympic teams, he participated in the 2002 Games in Salt Lake (placing 9th) and the 2006 Games in Turin, Italy. In the finals of the 2006 aerial competitions, Peterson was in third place after the first round, but fell to seventh place after the second jump, when he failed to solidly land the difficult "Hurricane" maneuver, which involves five spins and three somersaults.

The following day, February 24, 2006, he was dispatched from the Games after a drunken altercation during a post-competition celebration. U.S. Olympic official Jim McCarthy said, "This type of conduct is irresponsible and will not be tolerated. Like every athlete, Jeret had an opportunity to represent himself, his sport, and his country in a positive manner. He chose to do otherwise, and because of his unacceptable actions, his Olympic experience is ending early."

A month after the Olympics in Italy, Peterson won the 2006 U.S. National Championships at Killington, Vermont.

He was an alumnus of Timberline High School in Boise, and was one of the six athletes featured on the Week 6 episode of The Biggest Loser: Couples 3.

After a tumultuous four years on and off the snow following the 2006 Olympics, Peterson made a career comeback and in January 2010 was named to the U.S. Olympic freestyle team for the 2010 Winter Olympics. Entering the Olympic finals in fifth place, he successfully landed his signature "Hurricane" maneuver (5 twists, 3 flips) to win the silver medal.

== Death ==
On July 25, 2011, Peterson was found dead in Lambs Canyon, Utah. The cause of death was determined to be a self-inflicted gunshot wound. Three days previously, Peterson had been arrested for driving while intoxicated. He was still reeling from the suicide of a friend named Trevor Fernald, who had killed himself in front of Peterson in 2005, also from a self-inflicted gunshot. Peterson also had problems with alcohol and depression and admitted he had his own thoughts of suicide, stemming from child sexual abuse and the death of his sister, Kim, who was killed by a drunk driver in 1987.

A few days after Peterson's death, Utah law enforcement released a recording of the 911 call that Peterson made just before he committed suicide. In it Peterson told the dispatcher that he was going to kill himself and that he wanted the police to come and get his body.

Peterson's death was discussed in The Weight of Gold (2020), an HBO Sports Documentary which "explor(es) the mental health challenges that Olympic athletes often face."

== Results ==
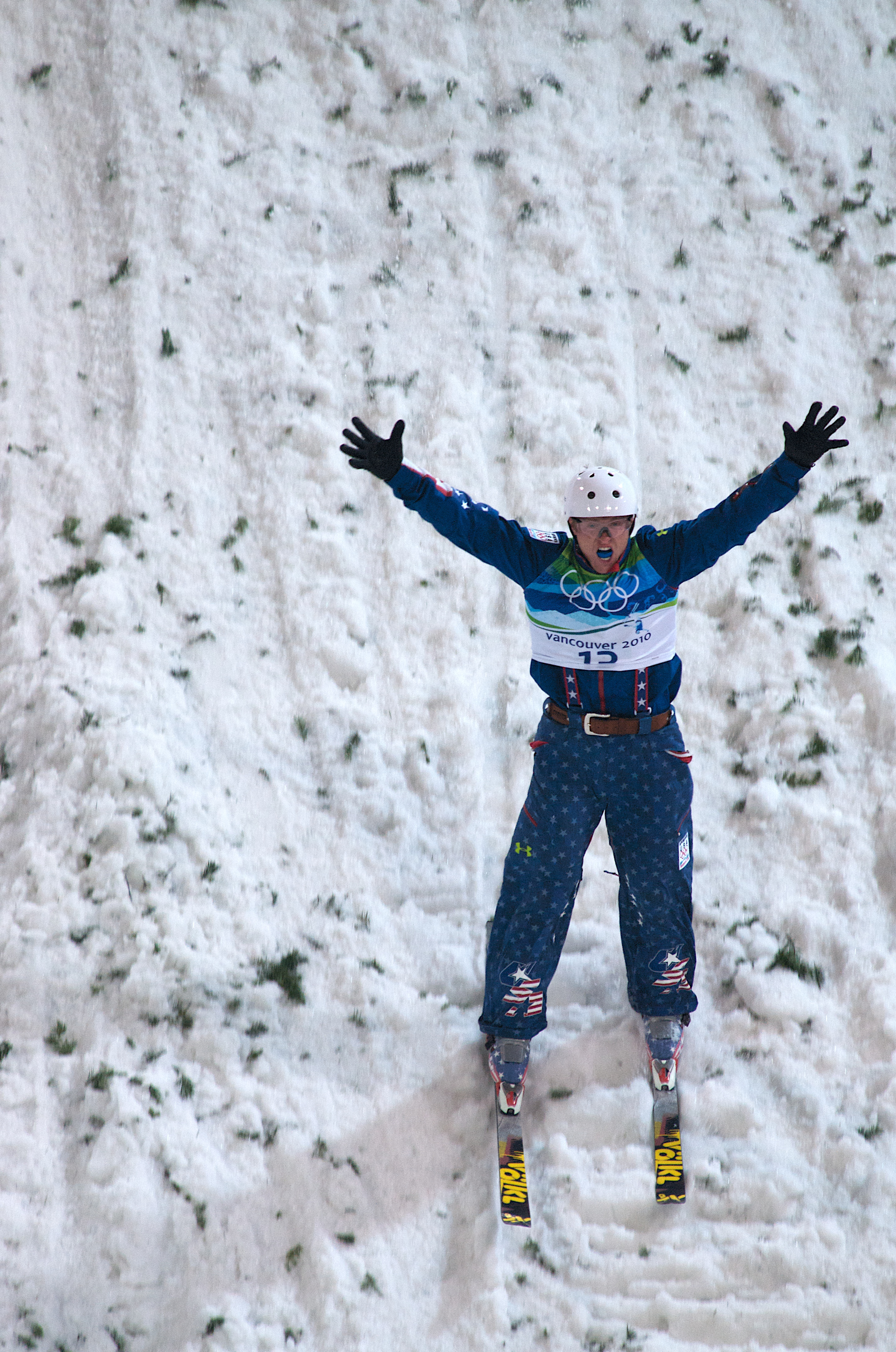
Jeret Peterson

- 1999 U.S. Junior National Championships – Gold – Aerials
- 2000 World Junior Championships – Bronze – Aerials
- 2001 World Junior Championships – Bronze – Aerials
- 2001 Junior Freestyle Skier of the Year – by Ski Racing magazine
- 2002 Olympic Winter Games – 9th place – Aerials
- 2002 World Cup season – 22nd place – Aerials
- 2003 World Championships – 6th place – Aerials
- 2003 World Cup season – 8th place – Aerials
- 2004 World Cup season – 16th place – Aerials
- 2005 World Championships – 12th place – Aerials
- 2005 World Cup season – 1st place – Aerials
- 2006 Olympic Winter Games – 7th place – Aerials
- 2006 World Cup season – 6th place – Aerials
- 2006 U.S. National Championships – GOLD – Aerials
- 2010 Olympic Winter Games – SILVER – Aerials
