= Lisa Chesson =

American ice hockey defenseman

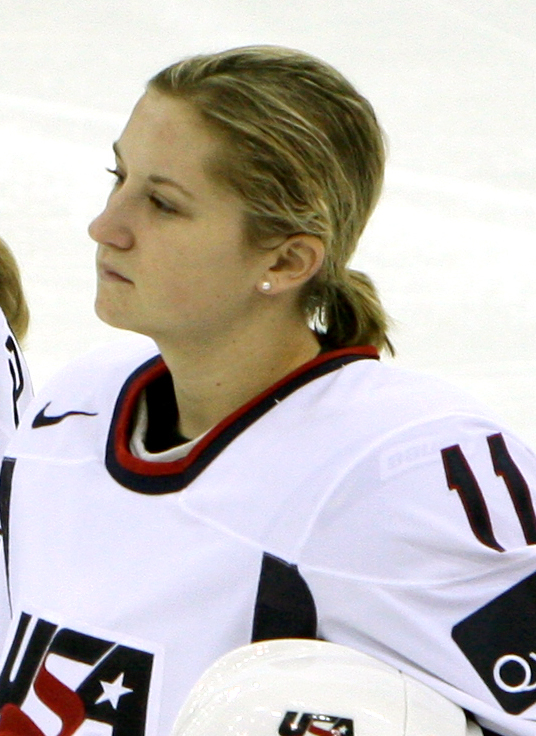
- Born: August 18, 1986 (age 40) Plainfield, Illinois, U.S.
- Height: 5 ft 6 in (168 cm)
- Weight: 145 lb (66 kg; 10 st 5 lb)
- Position: Defense
- Shoots: Left
- PHF team: Buffalo Beauts
- National team: United States
- Playing career: 2006–present
Medal record
Representing United States
Women's ice hockey
Olympic Games
| Silver medal – second place | 2010 Vancouver | Tournament |
IIHF World Women's Championships
| Gold medal – first place | 2009 Finland | Tournament |
| Gold medal – first place | 2013 Canada | Tournament |
| Silver medal – second place | 2012 United States | Tournament |
Women's 4 Nations Cup
| Gold medal – first place | 2011 Sweden | Tournament |

Lisa Chesson (born August 18, 1986) is an American ice hockey defender, currently playing for the Buffalo Beauts of the Premier Hockey Federation (PHF).

== Playing career ==
=== Early career ===
Chesson attended Plainfield Central High School in Plainfield, Illinois. She went on to play ice hockey for four years at Ohio State University, scoring 89 points in 145 games.

=== Professional ===
Chesson played professionally for the NWHL's Buffalo Beauts for three seasons, between 2016 and 2019, winning the Isobel Cup in 2017. She participated in the 3rd NWHL All-Star Game and the 2019 NWHL All-Star Game.

In May 2019, she joined the newly formed PWHPA, and would spend the entire season with the organisation.

In April 2020, she left the PWHPA to rejoin the Beauts for the 2020–21 NWHL season.

== International career ==
Chesson was a member of the United States hockey team which placed second in the 2007 edition of the 4 Nations Cup. She was named to the United States women's ice hockey team for the 2010 Winter Olympics, winning a silver medal. She played for the US at the 2009, 2012, and 2013 IIHF Women's World Championships, scoring a total of seven points in fifteen games, winning gold twice and silver once.

== Career statistics ==
| | | | Regular season | | | | | Playoffs |
| Season | Team | League | GP | G | A | Pts | PIM | GP | G | A | Pts | PIM |
|---|---|---|---|---|---|---|---|---|---|---|---|---|
| 2004–05 | Ohio State Buckeyes | NCAA | 37 | 3 | 6 | 9 | 12 | - | - | - | - | - |
| 2005–06 | Ohio State Buckeyes | NCAA | 36 | 3 | 14 | 17 | 6 | - | - | - | - | - |
| 2006–07 | Ohio State Buckeyes | NCAA | 37 | 13 | 24 | 37 | 32 | - | - | - | - | - |
| 2007–08 | Ohio State Buckeyes | NCAA | 35 | 8 | 18 | 26 | 16 | - | - | - | - | - |
| 2016-17 | Buffalo Beauts | NWHL | 7 | 0 | 3 | 3 | 0 | 1 | 0 | 1 | 1 | 0 |
| 2017-18 | Buffalo Beauts | NWHL | 14 | 1 | 4 | 5 | 16 | 2 | 0 | 0 | 0 | 0 |
| 2018-19 | Buffalo Beauts | NWHL | 16 | 1 | 8 | 9 | 6 | 2 | 0 | 0 | 0 | 0 |
| 2019-20 | Buffalo | PWHPA | - | - | - | - | - | - | - | - | - | - |
| NWHL totals | | | 37 | 2 | 15 | 17 | 22 | 5 | 0 | 1 | 1 | 0 |
