= Bryon Wilson =

American freestyle skier (born 1988)

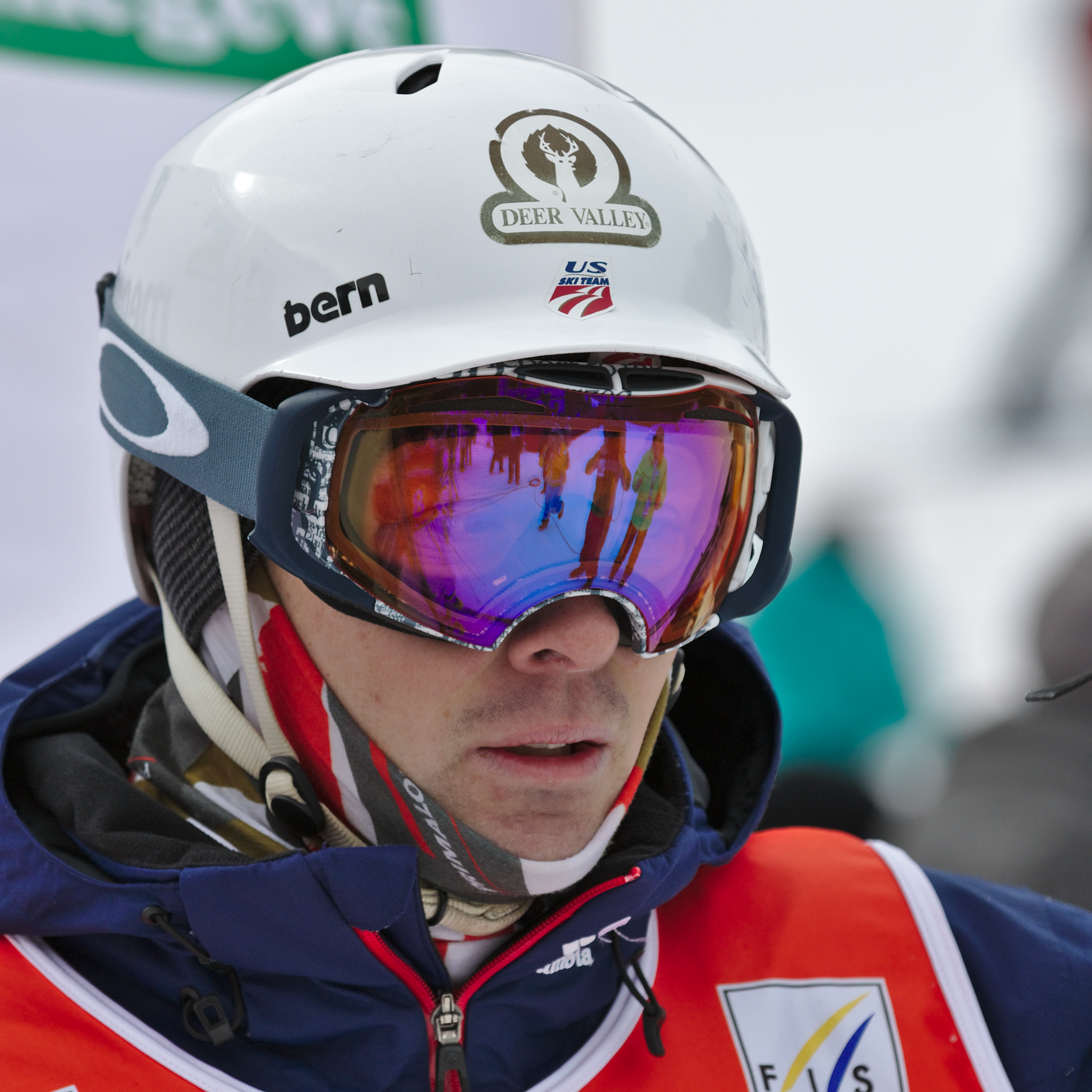

Personal information
- Born: April 7, 1988 (age 38) Butte, Montana
- Height: 1.78 m (5 ft 10 in)
- Weight: 172 lb (78 kg)

Sport
- Country: United States
- Sport: Freestyle skiing
Medal record
Men's Freestyle skiing
Representing the United States
Winter Olympics
| Bronze medal – third place | 2010 Vancouver | Moguls |

Bryon Wilson (born April 7, 1988) is an American freestyle skier and Olympic bronze medalist. He earned a spot on the US Freestyle Ski Team for the 2010 Winter Olympics after a solid beginning to the 2009–10 FIS Freestyle Skiing World Cup season where he had two 2nd-place finishes during the first weekend of competition at Suomu, Finland.

Bryon was born and lived in Butte, Montana, for most of his life until his family made the decision to move to Park City, Utah, to be closer to an advanced training facility to enable him, along with his younger brother Brad Wilson, to advance their skills and build a career in competitive skiing. The boys learned gymnastics from a young age and began skiing as toddlers. They later began to combine the two sports. Both brothers train at Deer Valley and the Utah Olympic Park in Park City.

At the 2010 Vancouver Olympics, Wilson won the bronze medal in men's moguls with a score of 26.08.

== See also ==
- Freestyle skiing at the 2010 Winter Olympics
- 2010 Winter Olympics
