= Haley Johnson =

American biathlete (born 1981)

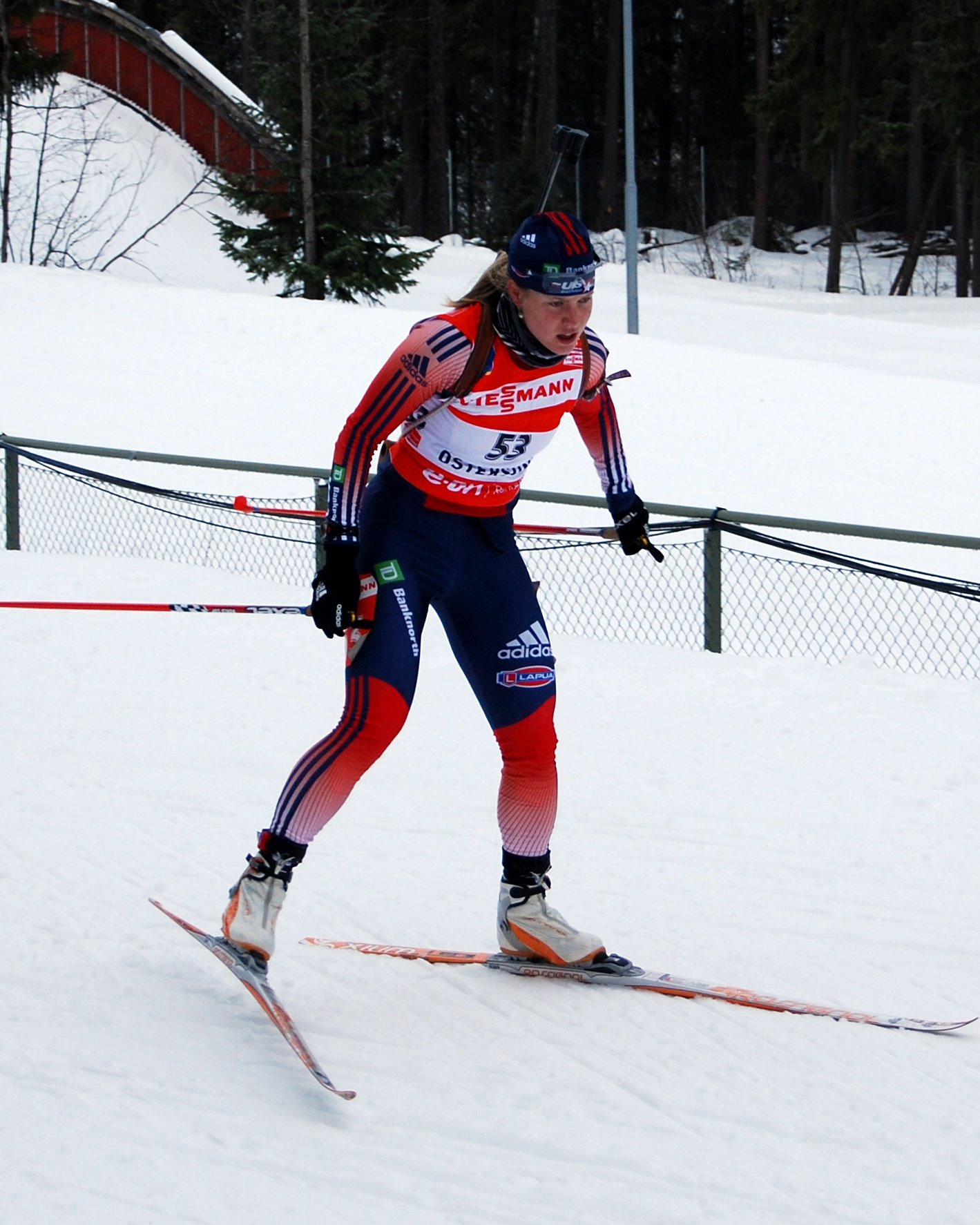
Haley Johnson

Haley Johnson (born December 8, 1981, in Denver, Colorado) is an American biathlete who has competed since 2008. Her best World Cup finish was 52nd in a pursuit event in Sweden in 2008.

Johnson's best finish at the Biathlon World Championships was 23rd in the individual event at Pyeongchang in 2009. At the 2010 Winter Olympics, she placed 80th at the 7.5 km sprint event.
