= Maxime Gingras (skier) =

Canadian freestyle skier (born 1984)

Maxime Gingras (born December 17, 1984) is a Canadian retired freestyle skier. He competed for Canada at the 2010 Winter Olympics, finishing 11th in the men's moguls. Gingras was born in Montreal.
