= Garrott Kuzzy =

American cross-country skier (born 1982)

Garrott Kuzzy (born November 26, 1982, in Wisconsin) is an American cross-country skier who has competed since 2001. His best individual World Cup finish was ninth in an individual sprint event in Canada in 2008.

It was announced on 26 January 2010 that Kuzzy qualified for the 2010 Winter Olympics where he earned his best finish of 13th in the 4 x 10 km relay.
