= Timofei Slivets =

Belarusian and Russian freestyle skier

Personal information
- Born: 22 October 1984 (age 41) Minsk, Byelorussian SSR, Soviet Union

Sport
- Sport: Skiing

World Cup career
- Indiv. podiums: 2
- Updated on 28 March 2013

Timofei Vitalyevich Slivets (Belarusian: Цімафей Слівец; Russian: Тимофей Витальевич Сливец; born 22 October 1984 in Minsk) is a Belarusian, and later Russian freestyle skier, specializing in aerials.

Slivets competed at the 2010 Winter Olympics for Belarus. He placed 12th in the qualifying round of the aerials event, earning the last spot in the final. He was 6th after one jump in the final, but had the lowest scored on his second jump, ending up 9th overall.

As of March 2013, his best showing at the World Championships is 10th, in the 2005.

Slivets made his World Cup debut in December 2003. As of March 2013, he has finished on the podium at World Cup events two times. Both finishes were silver medals, one in 2006/07 and the second in 2008/09. His best World Cup overall finish in aerials is 5th, in 2009/10.

== World Cup podiums ==
Date	Location	Rank	Event
10 December 2006	Beida Lake	2nd place, silver medalist(s)	Aerials
25 January 2009	Mont Gabriel	2nd place, silver medalist(s)	Aerials
