= Michael Morse (skier) =

American freestyle skier

Michael Morse (born April 2, 1981) is an American freestyle skier who has competed since 1997. His best World Cup finish was third, which was in a moguls event in Norway in 2009.

Morse's best finish at the FIS Freestyle World Ski Championships was 18th in the moguls event at Inawashiro in 2009.

He was named to the US team for the 2010 Winter Olympics in January 2010.
