= Matt DePeters =

American freestyle skier

Matt DePeters (born August 20, 1987) is an American freestyle skier who has competed since 2006. His best World Cup finish was 15th in an aerials event at Deer Valley, Utah in January 2010. He grew up skiing for the Buffalo Ski Club Freestyle Team.

DePeters was named to the United States team for the 2010 Winter Olympics in January 2010.
