= 2017–18 in skiing =

== Alpine skiing ==
=== 2018 Winter Olympics and Paralympics (Alpine skiing) ===
- February 11 – 24: Alpine skiing at the 2018 Winter Olympics
  - Men's Downhill winners: (gold) (Norway) Aksel Lund Svindal; (silver) (Norway) Kjetil Jansrud; (bronze) (Switzerland) Beat Feuz
  - Women's Downhill winners: (gold) (Italy) Sofia Goggia; (silver) (Norway) Ragnhild Mowinckel; (bronze) (United States) Lindsey Vonn
  - Men's Super G winners: (gold) (Austria) Matthias Mayer; (silver) (Switzerland) Beat Feuz; (bronze) (Norway) Kjetil Jansrud
  - Women's Super G winners: (gold) (Czech Republic) Ester Ledecká; (silver) (Austria) Anna Veith; (bronze) (Liechtenstein) Tina Weirather
  - Men's Giant Slalom winners: (gold) (Austria) Marcel Hirscher; (silver) (Norway) Henrik Kristoffersen; (bronze) (France) Alexis Pinturault
  - Women's Giant Slalom winners: (gold) (United States) Mikaela Shiffrin; (silver) (Norway) Ragnhild Mowinckel; (bronze) (Italy) Federica Brignone
  - Men's Slalom winners: (gold) (Sweden) André Myhrer; (silver) (Switzerland) Ramon Zenhäusern; (bronze) (Austria) Michael Matt
  - Women's Slalom winners: (gold) (Sweden) Frida Hansdotter; (silver) (Switzerland) Wendy Holdener; (bronze) (Austria) Katharina Gallhuber
  - Men's Combined winners: (gold) (Austria) Marcel Hirscher; (silver) (France) Alexis Pinturault; (bronze) (France) Victor Muffat-Jeandet
  - Women's Combined winners: (gold) (Switzerland) Michelle Gisin; (silver) (United States) Mikaela Shiffrin; (bronze) (Switzerland) Wendy Holdener
  - Mixed Team winners: (gold) Switzerland; (silver) Austria; (bronze) Norway
- March 10 – 18: Alpine skiing at the 2018 Winter Paralympics
  - Men's Visually Impaired Winners:
    - Downhill: (gold) (Canada) Mac Marcoux; (silver) (Slovakia) Jakub Krako; (bronze) (Italy) Giacomo Bertagnolli
    - Super G: (gold) (Slovakia) Jakub Krako; (silver) (Italy) Giacomo Bertagnolli; (bronze) (Slovakia) Miroslav Haraus
    - Giant Slalom: (gold) (Italy) Giacomo Bertagnolli; (silver) (Slovakia) Jakub Krako; (bronze) (Canada) Mac Marcoux
    - Slalom: (gold) (Italy) Giacomo Bertagnolli; (silver) (Slovakia) Jakub Krako; (bronze) (International Paralympic Committee) Valery Redkozubov
    - Super Combined: (gold) (Slovakia) Miroslav Haraus; (silver) (Spain) Jon Santacana Maiztegui; (bronze) (International Paralympic Committee) Valery Redkozubov
  - Men's Sitting Winners:
    - Downhill: (gold) (United States) Andrew Kurka; (silver) (Japan) Taiki Morii; (bronze) (New Zealand) Corey Peters
    - Super G: (gold) (Canada) Kurt Oatway; (silver) (United States) Andrew Kurka; (bronze) (France) Frédéric François
    - Giant Slalom: (gold) (Norway) Jesper Pedersen; (silver) (United States) Tyler Walker; (bronze) (Poland) Igor Sikorski
    - Slalom: (gold) (Croatia) Dino Sokolović; (silver) (United States) Tyler Walker; (bronze) (France) Frédéric François
    - Super Combined: (gold) (Netherlands) Jeroen Kampschreur; (silver) (France) Frédéric François; (bronze) (Norway) Jesper Pedersen
  - Men's Standing Winners:
    - Downhill: (gold) (Switzerland) Théo Gmür; (silver) (France) Arthur Bauchet; (bronze) (Austria) Markus Salcher
    - Super G: (gold) (Switzerland) Théo Gmür; (silver) (France) Arthur Bauchet; (bronze) (Austria) Markus Salcher
    - Giant Slalom: (gold) (Switzerland) Théo Gmür; (silver) (International Paralympic Committee) Alexey Bugaev; (bronze) (Canada) Alexis Guimond
    - Slalom: (gold) (New Zealand) Adam Hall; (silver) (France) Arthur Bauchet; (bronze) (United States) Jamie Stanton
    - Super Combined: (gold) (International Paralympic Committee) Alexey Bugaev; (silver) (France) Arthur Bauchet; (bronze) (New Zealand) Adam Hall
  - Women's Visually Impaired Winners:
    - Downhill: (gold) (Slovakia) Henrieta Farkašová; (silver) (United Kingdom) Millie Knight; (bronze) (Belgium) Eléonor Sana
    - Super G: (gold) (Slovakia) Henrieta Farkašová; (silver) (United Kingdom) Millie Knight; (bronze) (United Kingdom) Menna Fitzpatrick
    - Giant Slalom: (gold) (Slovakia) Henrieta Farkašová; (silver) (United Kingdom) Menna Fitzpatrick; (bronze) (Australia) Melissa Perrine
    - Slalom: (gold) (United Kingdom) Menna Fitzpatrick; (silver) (Slovakia) Henrieta Farkašová; (bronze) (United Kingdom) Millie Knight
    - Super Combined: (gold) (Slovakia) Henrieta Farkašová; (silver) (United Kingdom) Menna Fitzpatrick; (bronze) (Australia) Melissa Perrine
  - Women's Sitting Winners:
    - Downhill: (gold) (Germany) Anna Schaffelhuber; (silver) (Japan) Momoka Muraoka; (bronze) (United States) Laurie Stephens
    - Super G: (gold) (Germany) Anna Schaffelhuber; (silver) (Austria) Claudia Lösch; (bronze) (Japan) Momoka Muraoka
    - Giant Slalom: (gold) (Japan) Momoka Muraoka; (silver) (Netherlands) Linda van Impelen; (bronze) (Austria) Claudia Lösch
    - Slalom: (gold) (Germany) Anna-Lena Forster; (silver) (Japan) Momoka Muraoka; (bronze) (Austria) Heike Eder
    - Super Combined: (gold) (Germany) Anna-Lena Forster; (silver) (Germany) Anna Schaffelhuber; (bronze) (Japan) Momoka Muraoka
  - Women's Standing Winners:
    - Downhill: (gold) (France) Marie Bochet; (silver) (Germany) Andrea Rothfuss; (bronze) (Canada) Mollie Jepsen
    - Super G: (gold) (France) Marie Bochet; (silver) (Germany) Andrea Rothfuss; (bronze) (Canada) Alana Ramsay
    - Giant Slalom: (gold) (France) Marie Bochet; (silver) (Germany) Andrea Rothfuss; (bronze) (Canada) Mollie Jepsen
    - Slalom: (gold) (France) Marie Bochet; (silver) (Canada) Mollie Jepsen; (bronze) (Germany) Andrea Rothfuss
    - Super Combined: (gold) (Canada) Mollie Jepsen; (silver) (Germany) Andrea Rothfuss; (bronze) (Canada) Alana Ramsay

=== FIS World Championships (AS) ===
- August 27 – September 1, 2017: 2017 FIS Junior Grass Ski World Championships in (Italy) Sauris
  - Giant Slalom winners: (Czech Republic) Martin Bartak (m) / (Japan) Chisaki Maeda (f)
  - Slalom winners: (Czech Republic) Martin Bartak (m) / (Japan) Chisaki Maeda (f)
  - Super Combined winners: (Czech Republic) Martin Bartak (m) / (Czech Republic) Adela Kettnerova (f)
  - Super G winners: (Czech Republic) Martin Bartak (m) / (Japan) Chisaki Maeda (f)
- September 5 – 10, 2017: 2017 FIS Grass Ski World Championships in (Austria) Kaprun
  - Super G winners: (Czech Republic) Jan Gardavský (m) / (Czech Republic) Adela Kettnerova (f)
  - Super Combined winners: (Italy) Lorenzo Gritti (m) / (Japan) Chisaki Maeda (f)
  - Slalom winners: (Austria) Michael Stocker (m) / (Austria) Jacqueline Gerlach (f)
  - Giant Slalom winners: (Czech Republic) Jan Gardavský (m) / (Austria) Jacqueline Gerlach (f)
- January 29 – February 8: World Junior Alpine Skiing Championships 2018 in Davos
  - Downhill winners: (Switzerland) Marco Odermatt (m) / (Norway) Kajsa Vickhoff Lie (f)
  - Super G winners: (Switzerland) Marco Odermatt (m) / (Norway) Kajsa Vickhoff Lie (f)
  - Giant Slalom winners: (Switzerland) Marco Odermatt (m) / (Austria) Julia Scheib (f)
  - Slalom winners: (France) Clement Noel (m) / (Slovenia) Meta Hrovat (f)
  - Combined winners: (Switzerland) Marco Odermatt (m) / (Switzerland) Aline Danioth (f)
  - Team event winners: Switzerland (Camille Rast, Marco Odermatt, Aline Danioth, Semyel Bissig)

=== 2017–18 Alpine Skiing World Cup ===
- October 2017
- October 28 & 29: ASWC #1 in (Austria) Sölden
  - Note: The Men's Giant Slalom event was cancelled due to a wind storm.
  - Women's Giant Slalom winner: (Germany) Viktoria Rebensburg
- November 2017
- November 11 & 12: ASWC #2 in (Finland) Levi
  - Slalom winners: (Germany) Felix Neureuther (m) / (Slovakia) Petra Vlhová (f)
- November 22 – 26: ASWC #3 in (Canada) Lake Louise Ski Resort #1
  - Men's Downhill winner: (Switzerland) Beat Feuz
  - Men's Super G winner: (Norway) Kjetil Jansrud
- November 25 & 26: ASWC #4 in (United States) Killington Ski Resort
  - Women's Giant Slalom winner: (Germany) Viktoria Rebensburg
  - Women's Slalom winner: (United States) Mikaela Shiffrin
- November 28 – December 3: ASWC #5 in (Canada) Lake Louise Ski Resort #2
  - Women's Downhill winners: (Austria) Cornelia Hütter (#1) / (United States) Mikaela Shiffrin (#2)
  - Women's Super G winner: (Liechtenstein) Tina Weirather
- November 29 – December 3: ASWC #6 in (United States) Beaver Creek Resort
  - Men's Super G winner: (Austria) Vincent Kriechmayr
  - Men's Downhill winner: (Norway) Aksel Lund Svindal
  - Men's Giant Slalom winner: (Austria) Marcel Hirscher
- December 2017
- December 8 – 10: ASWC #7 in (Switzerland) St. Moritz
  - Note: Two, of three, Super G and the Alpine Combined events was cancelled.
  - Women's Super G winner: (Switzerland) Jasmine Flury
- December 9 & 10: ASWC #8 in (France) Val-d'Isère #1
  - Men's Giant Slalom winner: (France) Alexis Pinturault
  - Men's Slalom winner: (Austria) Marcel Hirscher
- December 13 – 16: ASWC #9 in (Italy) Val Gardena
  - Men's Super G winner: (Germany) Josef Ferstl
  - Men's Downhill winner: (Norway) Aksel Lund Svindal
- December 14 – 17: ASWC #10 in (France) Val-d'Isère #2
  - Note: The women's downhill event here was cancelled.
  - Women's Super G winners: (United States) Lindsey Vonn (#1) / (Austria) Anna Veith (#2)
- December 17 & 18: ASWC #11 in (Italy) Alta Badia
  - Men's Giant Slalom winner: (Austria) Marcel Hirscher
  - Men's Parallel Giant Slalom winner: (Sweden) Matts Olsson
- December 19 & 20: ASWC #12 in (France) Courchevel
  - Women's Giant Slalom & Parallel Slalom winner: (United States) Mikaela Shiffrin
- December 22: ASWC #13 in (Italy) Madonna di Campiglio
  - Men's Slalom winner: (Austria) Marcel Hirscher
- December 26 – 29: ASWC #14 in (Italy) Bormio
  - Men's Downhill winners: (Italy) Dominik Paris (#1) / (Austria) Matthias Mayer (#2)
  - Men's Alpine Combined winner: (France) Alexis Pinturault
- December 28 & 29: ASWC #15 in (Austria) Lienz
  - Women's Giant Slalom winner: (Italy) Federica Brignone
  - Women's Slalom winner: (United States) Mikaela Shiffrin
- January 2018
- January 1: ASWC #16 in (Norway) Oslo
  - City Event winners: (Sweden) André Myhrer (m) / (United States) Mikaela Shiffrin (f)
- January 3 & 4: ASWC #17 in (Croatia) Zagreb
  - Slalom winners: (m) / (United States) Mikaela Shiffrin (f)
- January 6 & 7: ASWC #18 in (Slovenia) Kranjska Gora
  - Women's Giant Slalom & Slalom winner: (United States) Mikaela Shiffrin
- January 6 & 7: ASWC #19 in (Switzerland) Adelboden
  - Men's Giant Slalom & Slalom winner: (Austria) Marcel Hirscher
- January 9: ASWC #20 in (Austria) Flachau
  - Women's Slalom winner: (United States) Mikaela Shiffrin
- January 9 – 14: ASWC #21 in (Switzerland) Wengen
  - Men's Alpine Combined winner: (France) Victor Muffat-Jeandet
  - Men's Downhill winners: (Italy) Dominik Paris (#1) / (Switzerland) Beat Feuz (#2)
  - Men's Slalom winner: (Austria) Marcel Hirscher
- January 11 – 14: ASWC #22 in (Austria) Bad Kleinkirchheim
  - Women's Downhill winner: (Italy) Sofia Goggia
  - Women's Super G winner: (Italy) Federica Brignone
- January 16 – 21: ASWC #23 in (Austria) Kitzbühel
  - Men's Super G winner: (Norway) Aksel Lund Svindal
  - Men's Downhill winner: (Germany) Thomas Dreßen
  - Men's Slalom winner: (Norway) Henrik Kristoffersen
- January 17 – 21: ASWC #24 in (Italy) Cortina d'Ampezzo
  - Women's Downhill winners: (Italy) Sofia Goggia (#1) / (United States) Lindsey Vonn (#2)
  - Women's Super G winner: (Switzerland) Lara Gut
- January 23: ASWC #25 in (Austria) Schladming
  - Men's Slalom winner: (Austria) Marcel Hirscher
- January 23: ASWC #26 in (Italy) Kronplatz
  - Women's Giant Slalom winner: (Germany) Viktoria Rebensburg
- January 25 – 28: ASWC #27 in (Germany) Garmisch-Partenkirchen #1
  - Men's Downhill winner: (Switzerland) Beat Feuz
  - Men's Giant Slalom winner: (Austria) Marcel Hirscher
- January 26 – 28: ASWC #28 in (Switzerland) Lenzerheide
  - Women's Alpine Combined winner: (Switzerland) Wendy Holdener
  - Women's Super G winner: (United States) Lindsey Vonn
  - Women's Giant Slalom winner: (France) Tessa Worley
  - Women's Slalom winner: (Slovakia) Petra Vlhová
- January 30: ASWC #29 in (Sweden) Stockholm
  - City Event winners: (Switzerland) Ramon Zenhäusern (m) / (Norway) Nina Haver-Løseth (f)
- February 2018
- February 1 – 4: ASWC #30 in (Germany) Garmisch-Partenkirchen #2
  - Women's Downhill winner: (United States) Lindsey Vonn (2 times)
- March 2018
- March 3 & 4: ASWC #31 in (Switzerland) Crans-Montana
  - Women's Super G winners: (Liechtenstein) Tina Weirather (#1) / (Italy) Sofia Goggia (#2)
  - Women's Alpine Combined winner: (Italy) Federica Brignone
- March 3 & 4: ASWC #32 in (Slovenia) Kranjska Gora Ski Resort
  - Men's Giant Slalom & Slalom winner: (Austria) Marcel Hirscher
- March 8 – 11: ASWC #33 in (Norway) Kvitfjell
  - Men's Downhill winner: (Germany) Thomas Dreßen
  - Men's Super G winner: (Norway) Kjetil Jansrud
- March 9 & 10: ASWC #34 in (Germany) Ofterschwang
  - Women's Giant Slalom winner: (Norway) Ragnhild Mowinckel
  - Women's Slalom winner: (United States) Mikaela Shiffrin
- March 12 – 18: ASWC #35 (final) in Åre ski resort
  - Note: Both the men's Slalom and women's Giant Slalom events were cancelled.
  - Men's Downhill winners: (Austria) Vincent Kriechmayr and (Austria) Matthias Mayer (tie)
  - Women's Downhill winner: (United States) Lindsey Vonn
  - Super G winners: (Austria) Vincent Kriechmayr (m) / (Italy) Sofia Goggia (f)
  - Men's Giant Slalom winner: (Austria) Marcel Hirscher
  - Women's Slalom winner: (United States) Mikaela Shiffrin
  - Women's Alpine Team Event winners: Sweden

=== 2017 FIS Grass Skiing World Cup ===
- June 10 & 11: GSWC #1 in (Austria) Rettenbach
  - Giant Slalom winners: (Italy) Edoardo Frau (m) / (Austria) Jacqueline Gerlach (f)
  - Super Combined winners: (Austria) Marc Zickbauer (m) / (Austria) Jacqueline Gerlach (f)
- July 29 & 30: GSWC #2 in (Italy) Montecampione
  - Slalom winners: (Italy) Lorenzo Gritti (m) / (Czech Republic) Adela Kettnerova (f)
  - Giant Slalom winners: (Austria) Michael Stocker (m) / (Austria) Kristin Hetfleisch (f)
- August 12 & 13: GSWC #3 in (Switzerland) Marbach
  - Giant Slalom winners: (Switzerland) Stefan Portmann (m) / (Slovakia) Barbara Míková (f)
  - Super G winners: (Switzerland) Stefan Portmann (m) / (Slovakia) Barbara Míková (f)
- August 19 & 20: GSWC #4 in (Czech Republic) Předklášteří
  - Giant Slalom winners: (Czech Republic) Martin Bartak (m) / (Slovakia) Barbara Míková (f)
  - Slalom winners: (Italy) Lorenzo Gritti (m) / (Slovakia) Barbara Míková (f)
- August 24 & 25: GSWC #5 in (Italy) Santa Caterina Valfurva
  - Slalom #1 winners: (Italy) Lorenzo Gritti (m) / (Austria) Jacqueline Gerlach (f)
  - Slalom #2 winners: (Italy) Lorenzo Gritti (m) / (Austria) Jacqueline Gerlach (f)

=== 2017 FIS Australia & New Zealand Cup (AS) ===
- August 21 – 25: A&NZ #1 in (Australia) Thredbo
  - Giant Slalom #1 winners: (New Zealand) Adam Barwood (m) / (Sweden) Sara Hector (f)
  - Giant Slalom #2 winners: (Austria) Daniel Meier (m) / (Sweden) Sara Hector (f)
  - Slalom #1 winners: (Germany) Linus Straßer (m) / (Sweden) Estelle Alphand (f)
  - Slalom #2 winners: (Germany) Linus Straßer (m) / (Sweden) Sara Hector (f)
- August 28 – 31: A&NZ #2 in (New Zealand) Coronet Peak
  - Giant Slalom #1 winners: (Canada) Erik Read (m) / (Norway) Mina Fürst Holtmann (f)
  - Giant Slalom #2 winners: (Canada) Erik Read (m) / (Sweden) Sara Hector (f)
  - Slalom #1 winners: (Austria) Manuel Feller (m) / (Sweden) Estelle Alphand (f)
  - Slalom #2 winners: (Switzerland) Marc Rochat (m) / (Austria) Chiara Mair (f)
- September 5 & 6: A&NZ #3 (final) in (New Zealand) Mount Hutt
  - Event cancelled.

=== 2017–18 FIS European Cup (AS) ===
- November 29 & 30, 2017: ECAS #1 in (Sweden) Funäsdalen
  - Women's Slalom winners: (Austria) Katharina Liensberger (#1) / (Germany) Marina Wallner (#2)
- December 3 & 4, 2017: ECAS #2 in (Norway) Hafjell
  - Women's Giant Slalom winners: (Sweden) Estelle Alphand (#1) / (Slovenia) Meta Hrovat (#2)
- December 5 & 6, 2017: ECAS #3 in (Sweden) Fjätervålen
  - Men's Slalom winners: (Switzerland) Ramon Zenhäusern (#1) / (Switzerland) Marc Rochat (#2)
- December 7 – 9, 2017: ECAS #3 in (Norway) Kvitfjell #1
  - Women's Alpine combined winner: (Austria) Franziska Gritsch
  - Women's Giant Slalom winner: (Switzerland) Vanessa Kasper
  - Women's Super G winner: (Norway) Kajsa Vickhoff Lie
- December 8 & 9, 2017: ECAS #4 in (Norway) Trysil
  - Men's Giant Slalom winners: (Austria) Johannes Strolz (2 times)
- December 13, 2017: ECAS #5 in (Italy) Obereggen
  - Men's Slalom winner: (Croatia) Matej Vidović
- December 14 & 15, 2017: ECAS #6 in (Italy) Andalo
  - Note: One, of two, Giant Slalom events was cancelled.
  - Women's Giant Slalom winner: (Slovenia) Meta Hrovat
- December 16, 2017: ECAS #7 in (Italy) Kronplatz
  - Parallel Slalom winners: (Austria) Dominik Raschner (m) / (Switzerland) Aline Danioth (f)
  - Slalom (Qualification Race) winners: (Croatia) Matej Vidović (m) / (Austria) Franziska Gritsch (f)
- December 18, 2017: ECAS #8 in (Italy) Fassa Valley
  - Men's Slalom winner: (Italy) Stefano Gross
- December 20 & 21, 2017: ECAS #9 in (Austria) Reiteralm
  - Men's Super G winners: (Austria) Niklas Köck (#1) / (Austria) Christoph Krenn (#2)
- December 19 – 22, 2017: ECAS #10 in (Italy) Fassa Valley
  - Women's Downhill winner: (Switzerland) Juliana Suter (2 times)
- January 5 & 6: ECAS #10 in (Switzerland) Wengen
  - Note: One, of two, Super G events was cancelled.
  - Men's Super G winner: (Italy) Emanuele Buzzi
- January 8 – 12: ECAS #11 in (Austria) Innerkrems
  - Women's Alpine combined winner: (Sweden) Lisa Hörnblad
  - Women's Super G winners: (Austria) Nina Ortlieb (#1) / (Austria) Franziska Gritsch (#2)
- January 8 – 12: ECAS #12 in (Austria) Saalbach-Hinterglemm
  - Men's Alpine combined winner: (Liechtenstein) Marco Pfiffner
  - Men's Downhill winners: (Austria) Daniel Hemetsberger (#1) / (Norway) Henrik Roea (#2)
- January 13 & 14: ECAS #13 in (Austria) Zell am See
  - Women's Slalom winners: (Sweden) Magdalena Fjällström (#1) / (Germany) Marina Wallner (#2)
- January 14 & 15: ECAS #14 in (Austria) Kirchberg
  - Men's Giant Slalom winners: (Italy) Florian Eisath (#1) / (Italy) Alex Hofer (#2)
- January 15 – 19: ECAS #15 in (Austria) Zauchensee
  - Note: Here, the downhill events competition were cancelled.
  - Women's Super G winner: (Sweden) Lisa Hörnblad
- January 17 – 21: ECAS #16 in (France) Méribel
  - Event cancelled.
- January 22 & 23: ECAS #17 in (Italy) Folgaria/Lavarone
  - Men's Giant Slalom winners: (Austria) Stefan Brennsteiner (#1) / (Switzerland) Marco Odermatt (#2)
- January 23 & 24: ECAS #18 in (Switzerland) Zinal
  - Event cancelled.
- January 25 & 26: ECAS #19 in (Switzerland) Melchsee-Frutt
  - Women's Slalom winners: (Sweden) Anna Swenn-Larsson (2 times)
- January 25 & 26: ECAS #20 in (France) Chamonix
  - Men's Slalom winners: (Austria) Johannes Strolz (#1) / (Italy) Simon Maurberger (#2)
- February 16 & 17: ECAS #21 in (Switzerland) Jaun
  - Men's Slalom winners: (Croatia) Matej Vidović (#1) / (Switzerland) Marc Rochat (#2)
- February 17 & 18: ECAS #22 in (Germany) Bad Wiessee
  - Women's Slalom winner: (Sweden) Charlotta Säfvenberg (2 times)
- February 19 – 23: ECAS #23 in (Italy) Sarntal
  - Men's Downhill winners: (Norway) Stian Saugestad (#1) / (Norway) Adrian Smiseth Sejersted (#2)
  - Men's Alpine combined winner: (Austria) Johannes Strolz
- February 24 – 28: ECAS #24 in (Switzerland) Crans-Montana
  - Women's Downhill winners: (Austria) Ariane Raedler (#1 & #3) / (Switzerland) Priska Nufer (#2)
  - Women's Super G winner: (Switzerland) Jasmine Flury
- February 26 & 27: ECAS #25 in (Switzerland) St. Moritz
  - Men's Giant Slalom winners: (France) Thibaut Favrot (#1) / (Switzerland) Thomas Tumler (#2)
- March 1 & 2: ECAS #26 in (Switzerland) Zinal
  - Women's Giant Slalom winners: (Norway) Thea Louise Stjernesund (#1) / (Austria) Katharina Liensberger (#2)
- March 3 – 6: ECAS #27 in (Norway) Kvitfjell #2
  - Men's Downhill winners: (Norway) Adrian Smiseth Sejersted (#1) / (Austria) Christopher Neumayer (#2)
- March 8 & 9: ECAS #28 in (Spain) La Molina
  - Women's Giant Slalom winners: (Norway) Thea Louise Stjernesund (#1) / (Austria) Nina Ortlieb (#2)
- March 10 & 11: ECAS #29 in (Germany) Berchtesgaden
  - Men's Giant Slalom winner: (Norway) Timon Haugan
  - Men's Slalom winner: (Switzerland) Marc Rochat
- March 12 – 18: ECAS #30 (final) in (Andorra) Soldeu - El Tarter
  - Downhill winners: (Austria) Otmar Striedinger (m) / (Austria) Ariane Raedler (f)
  - Giant Slalom winners: (Austria) Dominik Raschner (m) / (Norway) Kristine Gjelsten Haugen (f)
  - Super G winners: (Switzerland) Stefan Rogentin (m) / (Austria) Ariane Raedler (f)
  - Slalom winners: (Austria) Christian Hirschbuehl / (France) Josephine Forni (f)

=== 2017–18 Far East Cup (AS) ===
- December 6 – 9, 2017: FEC #1 in (China) Wanlong
  - Men's Slalom winners: (Czech Republic) Ondřej Berndt (2 times)
  - Women's Slalom winners: (Japan) Asa Ando (2 times)
  - Men's Giant Slalom winners: (Russia) Vladislav Novikov (2 times)
  - Women's Giant Slalom winners: (Japan) Sakurako Mukogawa (#1) / (Japan) Asa Ando (#2)
- December 13 – 16, 2017: FEC #2 in (China) Songhua
  - Men's Slalom winners: (Japan) Hideyuki Narita (2 times)
  - Women's Slalom winners: (Slovenia) Neja Dvornik (#1) / (Japan) Sakurako Mukogawa (#2)
  - Men's Giant Slalom winners: (Switzerland) Cédric Noger (2 times)
  - Women's Giant Slalom winners: (Japan) Sakurako Mukogawa (2 times)
- January 8 – 12: FEC #3 in (South Korea) High1 Resort
  - Men's Giant Slalom winners: (United Kingdom) Charlie Raposo (#1) / (Switzerland) Cédric Noger (#2)
  - Women's Giant Slalom winners: (Japan) Haruna Ishikawa (#1) / (Japan) Mio Arai (#2)
  - Men's Slalom winners: (Spain) Joaquim Salarich (#1) / (Spain) Juan del Campo (#2)
  - Women's Slalom winners: (Japan) Yukina Tomii (#1) / (Japan) Sakurako Mukogawa (#2)
  - Alpine Combined winners: (Slovakia) Matej Falat (m) / (Japan) Sakurako Mukogawa (f)
  - Super G winners: (Japan) Hideyuki Narita (m) / (Japan) Sakurako Mukogawa (f)
- January 14 & 15: FEC #4 in (South Korea) High1 Resort
  - Men's Slalom winners: (Slovakia) Matej Falat (#1) / (Spain) Juan del Campo (#2)
  - Women's Slalom winners: (Japan) Sakurako Mukogawa (#1) / (Japan) Haruna Ishikawa (#2)
- February 5 – 7: FEC #5 in (Japan) Engaru
  - Giant Slalom winners: (Sweden) Anthon Cassman (m) / (Japan) Haruna Ishikawa (f)
  - Men's Slalom winners: (Austria) Richard Leitgeb (#1) / (Japan) Hideyuki Narita (#2)
  - Women's Slalom winners: (France) Josephine Forni (2 times)
- March 9 – 11: FEC #6 in (Japan) Sapporo
  - Note: Here the Giant Slalom events are cancelled'.
  - Slalom winners: (Japan) Ryunosuke Ohkoshi (m) / (Japan) Sakurako Mukogawa (f)

=== 2017–18 North American Cup (AS) ===
- November 18 & 19, 2017: NAC #1 in (United States) Loveland Ski Area
  - Women's Slalom winners: (Canada) Erin Mielzynski (#1) / (Canada) Laurence St-Germain (#2)
- November 18 – 21, 2017: NAC #2 in (United States) Copper Mountain
  - Men's Giant Slalom winners: (Canada) Phil Brown (#1) / (Canada) Trevor Philp (#2)
  - Women's Giant Slalom winners: (Canada) Marie-Michèle Gagnon (#1) / (United States) AJ Hurt (#2)
  - Men's Slalom winners: (Canada) Phil Brown (#1) / (Canada) Jeffrey Read (#2)
- December 4 – 8, 2017: NAC #3 in (Canada) Lake Louise
  - Downhill winners: (Austria) Markus Dürager (m) / (Canada) Roni Remme (f)
  - Super G winners: (Canada) Sam Mulligan (m) / (Canada) Roni Remme (f)
- December 9 – 16, 2017: NAC #4 in (Canada) Panorama
  - Alpine combined winners: (United States) River Radamus (m) / (Canada) Roni Remme (f)
  - Men's Super G winners: (Canada) Jeffrey Read (#1) / (United States) River Radamus (#2)
  - Women's Super G winners: (Canada) Roni Remme (#1) / (United States) AJ Hurt (#2)
  - Men's Giant Slalom winners: (United States) Brian McLaughlin (#1) / (United States) River Radamus (#2)
  - Women's Giant Slalom winners: (Netherlands) Adriana Jelinkova (#1) / (New Zealand) Alice Robinson (#2)
  - Men's Slalom winners: (Switzerland) Tanguy Nef (#1) / (United States) Nolan Kasper (#2)
  - Women's Slalom winners: (Canada) Roni Remme (2 times)
- February 13 – 16: NAC #5 in (United States) Stowe Mountain Resort
  - Men's Giant Slalom winners: (Switzerland) Tanguy Nef (#1) / (United Kingdom) Charlie Raposo (#2)
  - Men's Slalom winners: (United States) Michael Ankeny (#1) / (United States) Luke Winters (#2)
- February 13 – 16: NAC #6 in (United States) Whiteface Mountain
  - Women's Giant Slalom winners: (Canada) Mikaela Tommy (2 times)
  - Women's Slalom winners: (United States) Nina O'Brien (2 times)
- February 26 – March 4: NAC #7 in (United States) Copper Mountain Resort
  - Men's Downhill winners: (Canada) James Crawford (#1) / (Canada) Jeffrey Read (#2)
  - Women's Downhill winners: (United States) Maureen Lebel (#1) / (Canada) Roni Remme (#2)
  - Alpine combined winners: (Canada) Sam Mulligan (m) / (Canada) Valérie Grenier (f)
  - Super G winners: (Canada) Broderick Thompson (m) / (Canada) Valérie Grenier (f)

=== 2017 FIS South American Cup (AS) ===
- August 1 – 5: SAC #1 in (Argentina) Chapelco
  - This event is cancelled.
- August 7 – 11: SAC #2 in (Argentina) Cerro Catedral
  - Giant Slalom winners: Men's here is cancelled / (Argentina) Nicol Gastaldi (f)
  - Slalom winners: (Argentina) Sebastiano Gastaldi (m) / (Belgium) Kim Vanreusel (f)
- August 12 – 15: SAC #3 in (Chile) Antillanca (part of South American Alpine Skiing Championships)
  - This event is cancelled.
- September 2: SAC #4 in (Chile) El Colorado #1
  - Giant Slalom winners: (Norway) Rasmus Windingstad (m) / (Italy) Anna Hofer (f)
- September 3–8: SAC #5 in (Chile) La Parva
  - Slalom winners: (France) Martin Arene (m) / (Spain) Núria Pau (f)
  - Downhill #1 winners: (France) Brice Roger (m) / (Czech Republic) Ester Ledecká (f)
  - Downhill #2 winners: (Slovenia) Klemen Kosi (m) / (Czech Republic) Ester Ledecká (f)
  - Super G winners: (Germany) Thomas Dreßen (m) / (Czech Republic) Ester Ledecká (f)
- September 10 – 12: SAC #6 in (Argentina) Chapelco
  - Giant Slalom #1 winners: (Argentina) Sebastiano Gastaldi (m) / (Chile) Noelle Barahona (f)
  - Giant Slalom #2 winner: (Argentina) Sebastiano Gastaldi (Men's only)
- September 13 & 14: SAC #7 in (Argentina) Cerro Catedral #2
  - Slalom winners: (Argentina) Tomas Birkner De Miguel (m) / (Spain) Núria Pau (f)
  - Giant Slalom here is cancelled.
- September 18 – 22: SAC #8 (final) in (Chile) El Colorado #2
  - Alpine combined #1 winners: (Norway) Rasmus Windingstad (m) / (Spain) Núria Pau (f)
  - Alpine combined #2 winners: (Serbia) Marko Vukićević (m) / (Russia) Aleksandra Prokopyeva (f)
  - Super G #1 winners: (Slovenia) Klemen Kosi (m) / (Russia) Aleksandra Prokopyeva (f)
  - Super G #2 winners: (United Kingdom) Jack Gower (m) / (Russia) Iulija Pleshkova (f)
  - Downhill #1 winners: (Serbia) Marko Vukićević (m) (2 runs) / (Russia) Aleksandra Prokopyeva (f)
  - Downhill #2 winners: (Serbia) Marko Vukićević (m) (2 runs) / (Russia) Aleksandra Prokopyeva (f)

== Biathlon ==
=== 2018 Winter Olympics and Paralympics (Biathlon) ===
- February 10 – 23: Biathlon at the 2018 Winter Olympics
  - Men's Individual winners: (gold) (Norway) Johannes Thingnes Bø; (silver) (Slovenia) Jakov Fak; (bronze) (Austria) Dominik Landertinger
  - Women's Individual winners: (gold) (Sweden) Hanna Öberg; (silver) (Slovakia) Anastasiya Kuzmina; (bronze) (Germany) Laura Dahlmeier
  - Men's Sprint winners: (gold) (Germany) Arnd Peiffer; (silver) (Czech Republic) Michal Krčmář; (bronze) (Italy) Dominik Windisch
  - Women's Sprint winners: (gold) (Germany) Laura Dahlmeier; (silver) (Norway) Marte Olsbu; (bronze) (Czech Republic) Veronika Vítková
  - Men's Pursuit winners: (gold) (France) Martin Fourcade; (silver) (Sweden) Sebastian Samuelsson; (bronze) (Germany) Benedikt Doll
  - Women's Pursuit winners: (gold) (Germany) Laura Dahlmeier; (silver) (Slovakia) Anastasiya Kuzmina; (bronze) (France) Anaïs Bescond
  - Men's Mass Start winners: (gold) (France) Martin Fourcade; (silver) (Germany) Simon Schempp; (bronze) (Norway) Emil Hegle Svendsen
  - Women's Mass Start winners: (gold) (Slovakia) Anastasiya Kuzmina; (silver) (Belarus) Darya Domracheva; (bronze) (Norway) Tiril Eckhoff
  - Men's 4 x 7.5 km Relay winners: (gold) Sweden; (silver) Norway; (bronze) Germany
  - Women's 4 x 6 km Relay winners: (gold) Belarus; (silver) Sweden; (bronze) France
  - Mixed 2 x 6 km / 2 x 7.5 km Relay winners: (gold) France; (silver) Norway; (bronze) Italy
- March 10, 13, & 16: Biathlon at the 2018 Winter Paralympics
  - Men's Visually Impaired Winners:
    - 7.5 km: (gold) (Ukraine) Vitaliy Lukyanenko; (silver) (Belarus) Yury Holub; (bronze) (Ukraine) Anatolii Kovalevskyi
    - 12.5 km: (gold) (Belarus) Yury Holub; (silver) (Ukraine) Oleksandr Kazik; (bronze) (Ukraine) Iurii Utkin
    - 15 km: (gold) (Ukraine) Vitaliy Lukyanenko; (silver) (Ukraine) Oleksandr Kazik; (bronze) (France) Anthony Chalencon
  - Men's Sitting Winners:
    - 7.5 km: (gold) (United States) Daniel Cnossen; (silver) (Belarus) Dzmitry Loban; (bronze) (Canada) Collin Cameron
    - 12.5 km: (gold) (Ukraine) Taras Rad; (silver) (United States) Daniel Cnossen; (bronze) (United States) Andy Soule
    - 15 km: (gold) (Germany) Martin Fleig; (silver) (United States) Daniel Cnossen; (bronze) (Canada) Collin Cameron
  - Men's Standing Winners:
    - 7.5 km: (gold) (France) Benjamin Daviet; (silver) (Canada) Mark Arendz; (bronze) (Ukraine) Ihor Reptyukh
    - 12.5 km: (gold) (France) Benjamin Daviet; (silver) (Ukraine) Ihor Reptyukh; (bronze) (Canada) Mark Arendz
    - 15 km: (gold) (Canada) Mark Arendz; (silver) (France) Benjamin Daviet; (bronze) (Norway) Nils Erik Ulset
  - Women's Visually Impaired Winners:
    - 6 km: (gold) (International Paralympic Committee) Mikhalina Lysova; (silver) (Ukraine) Oksana Shyshkova; (bronze) (Belarus) Sviatlana Sakhanenka
    - 10 km: (gold) (Ukraine) Oksana Shyshkova; (silver) (International Paralympic Committee) Mikhalina Lysova; (bronze) (Germany) Clara Klug
    - 12.5 km: (gold) (International Paralympic Committee) Mikhalina Lysova; (silver) (Ukraine) Oksana Shyshkova; (bronze) (Germany) Clara Klug
  - Women's Sitting Winners:
    - 6 km: (gold) (United States) Kendall Gretsch; (silver) (United States) Oksana Masters; (bronze) (Belarus) Lidziya Hrafeyeva
    - 10 km: (gold) (Germany) Andrea Eskau; (silver) (International Paralympic Committee) Marta Zaynullina; (bronze) (International Paralympic Committee) Irina Gulyayeva
    - 12.5 km: (gold) (Germany) Andrea Eskau; (silver) (United States) Oksana Masters; (bronze) (Belarus) Lidziya Hrafeyeva
  - Women's Standing Winners:
    - 6 km: (gold) (International Paralympic Committee) Ekaterina Rumyantseva; (silver) (International Paralympic Committee) Anna Burmistrova; (bronze) (Ukraine) Liudmyla Liashenko
    - 10 km: (gold) (International Paralympic Committee) Ekaterina Rumyantseva; (silver) (International Paralympic Committee) Anna Burmistrova; (bronze) (Ukraine) Liudmyla Liashenko
    - 12.5 km: (gold) (International Paralympic Committee) Anna Burmistrova; (silver) (International Paralympic Committee) Ekaterina Rumyantseva; (bronze) (Canada) Brittany Hudak

=== International biathlon championships ===
- January 23 – 28: 2018 IBU Open European Championships in (Italy) Ridnaun-Val Ridanna
  - Individual winners: (Austria) Felix Leitner (m) / (France) Chloe Chevalier (f)
  - Sprint winners: (Latvia) Andrejs Rastorgujevs (m) / (Ukraine) Iryna Varvynets (f)
  - Pursuit winners: (Russia) Alexandr Loginov (m) / (France) Chloe Chevalier (f)
  - Single mixed relay winners: Norway (Thekla Brun-Lie & Vetle Sjåstad Christiansen)
  - 2x6+2x7.5 km mixed relay winners: Ukraine (Yuliya Zhuravok, Iryna Varvynets, Artem Pryma, & Dmytro Pidruchnyi)
- January 30 – February 4: 2018 IBU Junior Open European Championships in (Slovenia) Pokljuka
  - Junior individual winners: (Russia) Said Karimulla Khalili (m) / (Austria) Tamara Steiner (f)
  - Junior sprint winners: (Russia) Igor Malinovskii (m) / (Russia) Valeriia Vasnetcova (f)
  - Junior pursuit winners: (Russia) Igor Malinovskii (m) / (Russia) Polina Shevnina (f)
  - Junior single mixed relay winners: Finland (Jenni Keranen & Jaakko Ranta)
  - Junior 2x6+2x7.5 km mixed relay winners: Russia (Polina Shevnina, Valeriia Vasnetcova, Vasilii Tomshin, & Igor Malinovskii)
- February 26 – March 4: 2018 IBU Youth/Junior World Championships in (Estonia) Otepää
  - Junior individual winners: (Russia) Igor Malinovskii (m) / (Poland) Kamila Zuk (f)
  - Junior sprint winners: (Russia) Vasilii Tomshin (m) / (Poland) Kamila Zuk (f)
  - Junior pursuit winners: (Norway) Sverre Dahlen Aspenes (m) / (Czech Republic) Marketa Davidova (f)
  - Junior Men's 4x7.5 km relay winners: Russia (Said Karimulla Khalili, Vasilii Tomshin, Viacheslav Maleev, & Igor Malinovskii)
  - Junior Women's 3x6 km relay winners: France (Camille Bened, Myrtille Begue, & Lou Jeanmonnot-Laurent)
  - Youth individual winners: (Russia) Mikhail Pervushin (m) / (Sweden) Elvira Oeberg (f)
  - Youth sprint winners: (Russia) Mikhail Pervushin (m) / (Sweden) Elvira Oeberg (f)
  - Youth pursuit winners: (Russia) Andrei Viukhin (m) / (Russia) Anastasiia Goreeva (f)
  - Youth Men's 3x7.5 km relay winners: Russia (Denis Tashtimerov, Andrei Viukhin, & Mikhail Pervushin)
  - Youth Women's 3x6 km relay winners: Sweden (Amanda Lundstroem, Ella Halvarsson, & Elvira Oeberg)

=== 2017–18 Biathlon World Cup ===
- November 24, 2017 – December 3, 2017: BWC #1 in (Sweden) Östersund
  - Individual winners: (Norway) Johannes Thingnes Bø (m) / (Belarus) Nadezhda Skardino (f)
  - Sprint winners: (Norway) Tarjei Bø (m) / (Germany) Denise Herrmann (f)
  - Pursuit winners: (France) Martin Fourcade (m) / (Germany) Denise Herrmann (f)
  - Single mixed relay winners: Austria (Lisa Hauser & Simon Eder)
  - 2x6+2x7.5 km Mixed Relay winners: Norway (Ingrid Landmark Tandrevold, Tiril Eckhoff, Johannes Thingnes Bø, & Emil Hegle Svendsen)
- December 5 – 10, 2017: BWC #2 in (Austria) Hochfilzen
  - Sprint winners: (Norway) Johannes Thingnes Bø (m) / (Belarus) Darya Domracheva (f)
  - Pursuit winners: (Norway) Johannes Thingnes Bø (m) / (Slovakia) Anastasiya Kuzmina (f)
  - Men's 4x7.5 km relay winners: Norway (Ole Einar Bjørndalen, Henrik L'Abée-Lund, Erlend Bjøntegaard, & Lars Helge Birkeland)
  - Women's 4x6 km relay winners: Germany (Vanessa Hinz, Franziska Hildebrand, Maren Hammerschmidt, & Laura Dahlmeier)
- December 12 – 17, 2017: BWC #3 in (France) Annecy-Le Grand-Bornand
  - Sprint winners: (Norway) Johannes Thingnes Bø (m) / (Slovakia) Anastasiya Kuzmina (f)
  - Pursuit winners: (Norway) Johannes Thingnes Bø (m) / (Germany) Laura Dahlmeier (f)
  - Mass Start winners: (France) Martin Fourcade (m) / (France) Justine Braisaz (f)
- January 2 – 7: BWC #4 in (Germany) Oberhof
  - Sprint winners: (France) Martin Fourcade (m) / (Slovakia) Anastasiya Kuzmina (f)
  - Pursuit winners: (France) Martin Fourcade (m) / (Slovakia) Anastasiya Kuzmina (f)
  - Men's 4x7.5 km relay winners: Sweden (Martin Ponsiluoma, Jesper Nelin, Sebastian Samuelsson, & Fredrik Lindström)
  - Women's 4x6 km relay winners: France (Anaïs Bescond, Anaïs Chevalier, Célia Aymonier, & Justine Braisaz)
- January 9 – 14: BWC #5 in Ruhpolding
  - Individual winners: (France) Martin Fourcade (m) / (Italy) Dorothea Wierer (f)
  - Men's 4x7.5 km relay winners: Norway (Lars Helge Birkeland, Tarjei Bø, Emil Hegle Svendsen, & Johannes Thingnes Bø)
  - Women's 4x6 km relay winners: Germany (Franziska Preuß, Denise Herrmann, Franziska Hildebrand, & Laura Dahlmeier)
  - Mass Start winners: (Norway) Johannes Thingnes Bø (m) / (Finland) Kaisa Mäkäräinen (f)
- January 16 – 21: BWC #6 in (Italy) Antholz-Anterselva
  - Sprint winners: (Norway) Johannes Thingnes Bø (m) / (Norway) Tiril Eckhoff (f)
  - Pursuit winners: (Norway) Johannes Thingnes Bø (m) / (Germany) Laura Dahlmeier (f)
  - Mass Start winners: (France) Martin Fourcade (m) / (Belarus) Darya Domracheva (f)
- March 6 – 11: BWC #7 in (Finland) Kontiolahti
  - Sprint winners: (Russia) Anton Shipulin (m) / (Belarus) Darya Domracheva (f)
  - Single mixed relay winners: France (Anaïs Chevalier & Antonin Guigonnat)
  - 2x6+2x7.5 km Mixed Relay winners: Italy (Dorothea Wierer, Lisa Vittozzi, Dominik Windisch, & Lukas Hofer)
  - Mass Start winners: (Austria) Julian Eberhard (m) / (Germany) Vanessa Hinz (f)
- March 13 – 18: BWC #8 in Oslo-Holmenkollen
  - Sprint winners: (Norway) Henrik L'Abée-Lund (m) / (Slovakia) Anastasiya Kuzmina (f)
  - Pursuit winners: (France) Martin Fourcade (m) / (Belarus) Darya Domracheva (f)
  - Men's 4x7.5 km relay winners: Norway (Lars Helge Birkeland, Henrik L'Abée-Lund, Tarjei Bø, & Johannes Thingnes Bø)
  - Women's 4x6 km relay winners: France (Anaïs Chevalier, Célia Aymonier, Marie Dorin Habert, & Anaïs Bescond)
- March 20 – 25: BWC #9 (final) in (Russia) Tyumen
  - Sprint winners: (France) Martin Fourcade (m) / (Belarus) Darya Domracheva (f)
  - Pursuit winners: (France) Martin Fourcade (m) / (Finland) Kaisa Mäkäräinen (f)
  - Mass Start winners: (Russia) Maxim Tsvetkov (m) / (Belarus) Darya Domracheva (f)

=== 2017–18 IBU Cup ===
- November 22 – 26, 2017: IBU Cup #1 in (Norway) Sjusjøen
  - Men's 10 km winners: (France) Emilien Jacquelin (#1) / (Norway) Tarjei Bø (#2)
  - Women's 7.5 km winners: (Russia) Uliana Kaisheva (#1) / (Germany) Denise Herrmann (#2)
  - Single mixed relay winners: France (Julia Simon & Antonin Guigonnat)
  - 2x6+2x7.5 km Mixed Relay winners: Russia (Uliana Kaisheva, Irina Uslugina, Alexander Povarnitsyn, Alexey Slepov)
- December 7 – 10, 2017: IBU Cup #2 in (Switzerland) Lenzerheide
  - Pursuit winners: (France) Antonin Guigonnat (m) / (Russia) Uliana Kaisheva (f)
  - Sprint winners: (France) Antonin Guigonnat (m) / (Russia) Uliana Kaisheva (f)
  - Single mixed relay winners: Norway (Thekla Brun-Lie & Vetle Sjåstad Christiansen)
  - 2x6+2x7.5 km Mixed Relay winners: France (Enora Latuillière, Chloe Chevalier, Clement Dumont, & Fabien Claude)
- December 13 – 17, 2017: IBU Cup #3 in (Austria) Obertilliach
  - Individual winners: (Norway) Vetle Sjåstad Christiansen (m) / (Poland) Monika Hojnisz (f)
  - Sprint winners: (Russia) Dmitry Malyshko (m) / (Germany) Karolin Horchler (f)
  - Single mixed relay winners: Russia (Kristina Reztsova & Alexey Volkov)
  - 2x6+2x7.5 km Mixed Relay winners: Norway (Emilie Aagheim Kalkenberg, Karoline Offigstad Knotten, Vetle Sjåstad Christiansen, & Vegard Gjermundshaug)
- January 5 – 7: IBU Cup #4 in (Slovakia) Brezno-Osrblie
  - Men's 10 km winners: (France) Simon Fourcade (#1) / (Norway) Vegard Gjermundshaug (#2)
  - Women's 7.5 km winner: (Russia) Uliana Kaisheva (2 times)
- January 10 – 13: IBU Cup #5 in (Germany) Großer Arber
  - Individual winners: (France) Jean-Guillaume Béatrix (m) / (Germany) Nadine Horchler (f)
  - Sprint winners: (Norway) Vetle Sjåstad Christiansen (m) / (Norway) Hilde Fenne (f)
- February 1 – 3: IBU Cup #6 in (Italy) Martell-Val Martello
  - Sprint winners: (Russia) Alexandr Loginov (m) / (Russia) Victoria Slivko (f)
  - Pursuit winners: (Russia) Alexandr Loginov (m) / (Russia) Anastasia Zagoruiko (f)
- March 9 – 11: IBU Cup #7 in (Russia) Uvat
  - Individual winners: (France) Fabien Claude (m) / (Russia) Irina Uslugina (f)
  - Sprint winners: (Russia) Alexandr Loginov (m) / (Russia) Evgeniya Pavlova (f)
- March 13 – 17: IBU Cup #8 (final) in (Russia) Khanty-Mansiysk
  - Super Sprint winners: (Norway) Vetle Sjåstad Christiansen (m) / (Germany) Karolin Horchler (f)
  - Sprint winners: (Russia) Alexey Slepov (m) / (Austria) Julia Schwaiger (f)
  - Pursuit winners: (Russia) Alexandr Loginov (m) / (Russia) Irina Uslugina (f)

=== 2017–18 IBU Junior Cup ===
- December 8 – 10, 2017: IBUJC #1 in (Austria) Obertilliach
  - Junior Sprint #1 winners: (France) Hugo Rivail (m) / (France) Myrtille Begue (f)
  - Junior Sprint #2 winners: (France) Emilien Claude (m) / (Germany) Sophia Schneider (f)
- December 14 – 16, 2017: IBUJC #2 in (Italy) Ridnaun-Val Ridanna
  - Junior Individual winners: (Russia) Vasilii Tomshin (m) / (Italy) Irene Lardschneider (f)
  - Junior Sprint winners: (Belarus) Dzmitry Lazouski (m) / (Germany) Marina Sauter (f)
- January 25 – 27: IBUJC #3 (final) in (Czech Republic) Nové Město na Moravě
  - Note: This event was supposed to be held in Duszniki-Zdrój, but it was moved due to unexplained reasons.
  - Junior Sprint #1 winners: (France) Emilien Claude (m) / (France) Lou Jeanmonnot-Laurent (f)
  - Junior Sprint #2 winners: (France) Martin Perrillat Bottonet (m) / (Germany) Sophia Schneider (f)

== Cross-country skiing ==
=== 2018 Winter Olympics and Paralympics (XC) ===
- February 10 – 25: Cross-country skiing at the 2018 Winter Olympics
  - Men's 15 km Freestyle winners: (gold) (Switzerland) Dario Cologna; (silver) (Norway) Simen Hegstad Krüger; (bronze) (International Olympic Committee) Denis Spitsov
  - Women's 10 km Freestyle winners: (gold) (Norway) Ragnhild Haga; (silver) (Sweden) Charlotte Kalla; (bronze) (Norway) Marit Bjørgen; (bronze) (Finland) Krista Pärmäkoski
  - Men's 30 km Skiathlon winners: (gold) (Norway) Simen Hegstad Krüger; (silver) (Norway) Martin Johnsrud Sundby; (bronze) (Norway) Hans Christer Holund
  - Women's 15 km Skiathlon winners: (gold) (Sweden) Charlotte Kalla; (silver) (Norway) Marit Bjørgen; (bronze) (Finland) Krista Pärmäkoski
  - Men's 50 km Classical winners: (gold) (Finland) Iivo Niskanen; (silver) (International Olympic Committee) Aleksandr Bolshunov; (bronze) (International Olympic Committee) Andrey Larkov
  - Women's 30 km Classical winners: (gold) (Norway) Marit Bjørgen; (silver) (Finland) Krista Pärmäkoski; (bronze) (Sweden) Stina Nilsson
  - Men's 4 x 10 km Relay winners: (gold) Norway; (silver) Olympic Athletes from Russia; (bronze) France
  - Women's 4 x 5 km Relay winners: (gold) Norway; (silver) Sweden; (bronze) Olympic Athletes from Russia
  - Men's Sprint Classical winners: (gold) (Norway) Johannes Høsflot Klæbo; (silver) (Italy) Federico Pellegrino; (bronze) (International Olympic Committee) Alexander Bolshunov
  - Women's Sprint Classical winners: (gold) (Sweden) Stina Nilsson; (silver) (Norway) Maiken Caspersen Falla; (bronze) (International Olympic Committee) Yulia Belorukova
  - Men's Team Sprint Freestyle winners: (gold) Norway (Martin Johnsrud Sundby & Johannes Høsflot Klæbo); (silver) (International Olympic Committee) (Denis Spitsov & Aleksandr Bolshunov); (bronze) France (Maurice Manificat & Richard Jouve)
  - Women's Team Sprint Freestyle winners: (gold) United States (Kikkan Randall & Jessie Diggins); (silver) Sweden (Charlotte Kalla & Stina Nilsson); (bronze) Norway (Marit Bjørgen & Maiken Caspersen Falla)
- March 11 – 18: Cross-country skiing at the 2018 Winter Paralympics
  - Men's Visually Impaired Winners:
    - Sprint: (gold) (Canada) Brian McKeever; (silver) (Sweden) Zebastian Modin; (bronze) (Norway) Eirik Bye
    - 10 km: (gold) (Canada) Brian McKeever; (silver) (United States) Jake Adicoff; (bronze) (Belarus) Yury Holub
    - 20 km Freestyle: (gold) (Canada) Brian McKeever; (silver) (Belarus) Yury Holub; (bronze) (France) Thomas Clarion
  - Men's Sitting Winners:
    - Sprint: (gold) (United States) Andy Soule; (silver) (Belarus) Dzmitry Loban; (bronze) (United States) Daniel Cnossen
    - 7.5 km: (gold) (South Korea) Sin Eui-hyun; (silver) (United States) Daniel Cnossen; (bronze) (Ukraine) Maksym Yarovyi
    - 15 km: (gold) (Ukraine) Maksym Yarovyi; (silver) (United States) Daniel Cnossen; (bronze) (South Korea) Sin Eui-hyun
  - Men's Standing Winners:
    - Sprint: (gold) (Kazakhstan) Alexandr Kolyadin; (silver) (Japan) Yoshihiro Nitta; (bronze) (Canada) Mark Arendz; (bronze) (Finland) Ilkka Tuomisto
    - 10 km: (gold) (Japan) Yoshihiro Nitta; (silver) (Ukraine) Grygorii Vovchynskyi; (bronze) (Canada) Mark Arendz
    - 20 km Freestyle: (gold) (Ukraine) Ihor Reptyukh; (silver) (France) Benjamin Daviet; (bronze) (Norway) Håkon Olsrud
  - Women's Visually Impaired Winners:
    - Sprint: (gold) (Belarus) Sviatlana Sakhanenka; (silver) (International Paralympic Committee) Mikhalina Lysova; (bronze) (Ukraine) Oksana Shyshkova
    - 7.5 km: (gold) (Belarus) Sviatlana Sakhanenka; (silver) (International Paralympic Committee) Mikhalina Lysova; (bronze) (Austria) Carina Edlinger
    - 15 km Freestyle: (gold) (Belarus) Sviatlana Sakhanenka; (silver) (Ukraine) Oksana Shyshkova; (bronze) (International Paralympic Committee) Mikhalina Lysova
  - Women's Sitting Winners:
    - Sprint: (gold) (United States) Oksana Masters; (silver) (Germany) Andrea Eskau; (bronze) (International Paralympic Committee) Marta Zaynullina
    - 5 km: (gold) (United States) Oksana Masters; (silver) (Germany) Andrea Eskau; (bronze) (International Paralympic Committee) Marta Zaynullina
    - 12 km: (gold) (United States) Kendall Gretsch; (silver) (Germany) Andrea Eskau; (bronze) (United States) Oksana Masters
  - Women's Standing Winners:
    - Sprint: (gold) (International Paralympic Committee) Anna Burmistrova; (silver) (Norway) Vilde Nilsen; (bronze) (Canada) Natalie Wilkie
    - 7.5 km: (gold) (Canada) Natalie Wilkie; (silver) (International Paralympic Committee) Ekaterina Rumyantseva; (bronze) (Canada) Emily Young
    - 15 km Freestyle: (gold) (International Paralympic Committee) Ekaterina Rumyantseva; (silver) (International Paralympic Committee) Anna Burmistrova; (bronze) (Ukraine) Liudmyla Liashenko
  - Relays
    - 4 x 2.5 km Mixed Relay winners: (gold) Ukraine; (silver) Canada; (bronze) Germany
    - 4 x 2.5 km Open Relay winners: (gold) France; (silver) Norway; (bronze) Canada

=== 2017–18 Tour de Ski ===
- December 30, 2017 – January 1, 2018: TdS #1 in (Switzerland) Lenzerheide
  - Sprint Freestyle winners: (Russia) Sergey Ustiugov (m) / (Switzerland) Laurien van der Graaff (f)
  - Classical winners: (Switzerland) Dario Cologna (m) / (Norway) Ingvild Flugstad Østberg (f)
  - Freestyle Pursuit winners: (Switzerland) Dario Cologna (m) / (Norway) Ingvild Flugstad Østberg (f)
- January 3 & 4: TdS #2 in (Germany) Oberstdorf
  - Note: The sprint classical events here was cancelled, due to a thunderstorm.
  - Freestyle Mass Start winners: (Norway) Emil Iversen (m) / (Norway) Ingvild Flugstad Østberg (f)
- January 6 & 7: TdS #3 (final) in (Italy) Fiemme Valley
  - Classical Mass Start winners: (Kazakhstan) Alexey Poltoranin (m) / (Norway) Heidi Weng (f)
  - Freestyle Pursuit winners: (Switzerland) Dario Cologna (m) / (Norway) Heidi Weng (f)

=== 2017–18 FIS Cross-Country World Cup ===
- November 24 – 26, 2017: CCWC #1 in (Finland) Kuusamo (Ruka)
  - Classical winners: (Norway) Johannes Høsflot Klæbo (m) / (Norway) Marit Bjørgen (f)
  - Sprint Classical winners: (Norway) Johannes Høsflot Klæbo (m) / (Sweden) Stina Nilsson (f)
  - Freestyle Pursuit winners: (France) Maurice Manificat (m) / (Norway) Ragnhild Haga (f)
- December 2 & 3, 2017: CCWC #2 in (Norway) Lillehammer
  - Sprint Classical winners: (Norway) Johannes Høsflot Klæbo (m) / (Norway) Maiken Caspersen Falla (f)
  - Skiathlon winners: (Norway) Johannes Høsflot Klæbo (m) / (Sweden) Charlotte Kalla (f)
- December 9 & 10, 2017: CCWC #3 in (Switzerland) Davos
  - Freestyle winners: (France) Maurice Manificat (m) / (Norway) Ingvild Flugstad Østberg (f)
  - Sprint Freestyle winners: (Norway) Johannes Høsflot Klæbo (m) / (Sweden) Stina Nilsson (f)
- December 16 & 17, 2017: CCWC #4 in (Italy) Toblach
  - Classical Pursuit winners: (Kazakhstan) Alexey Poltoranin (m) / (Norway) Ingvild Flugstad Østberg (f)
  - Freestyle winners: (Norway) Simen Hegstad Krüger (m) / (Sweden) Charlotte Kalla (f)
- January 13 & 14: CCWC #5 in (Germany) Dresden
  - Sprint Freestyle winners: (Italy) Federico Pellegrino (m) / (Sweden) Hanna Falk (f)
  - Team Sprint Freestyle winners: Italy (Dietmar Nöckler & Federico Pellegrino) (m) / Sweden (Ida Ingemarsdotter & Maja Dahlqvist) (f)
- January 20 & 21: CCWC #6 in (Slovenia) Planica
  - Sprint Classical winners: (Norway) Johannes Høsflot Klæbo (m) / (Sweden) Stina Nilsson (f)
  - Classical winners: (Kazakhstan) Alexey Poltoranin (m) / (Finland) Krista Pärmäkoski (f)
- January 27 & 28: CCWC #7 in (Austria) Seefeld in Tirol
  - Sprint Freestyle winners: (Norway) Johannes Høsflot Klæbo (m) / (United States) Sophie Caldwell (f)
  - Freestyle Mass Start winners: (Switzerland) Dario Cologna (m) / (United States) Jessie Diggins (f)
- March 3 & 4: CCWC #8 in (Finland) Lahti
  - Sprint Freestyle winners: (Italy) Federico Pellegrino (m) / (Norway) Maiken Caspersen Falla (f)
  - Classical winners: (Kazakhstan) Alexey Poltoranin (m) / (Finland) Krista Pärmäkoski (f)
- March 7: CCWC #9 in (Norway) Drammen
  - Sprint Classical winners: (Norway) Johannes Høsflot Klæbo (m) / (Norway) Maiken Caspersen Falla (f)
- March 10 & 11: CCWC #10 in (Norway) Oslo
  - Freestyle Mass Start winners: (Switzerland) Dario Cologna (m) / (Norway) Marit Bjørgen (f)
- March 16 – 18: CCWC #11 (final) in (Sweden) Falun
  - Sprint Freestyle winners: (Norway) Johannes Høsflot Klæbo (m) / (Sweden) Hanna Falk (f)
  - Classical Mass Start winners: (Russia) Alexander Bolshunov (m) / (Finland) Krista Pärmäkoski (f)
  - Freestyle Pursuit winners: (Russia) Alexander Bolshunov (m) / (Norway) Marit Bjørgen (f)

=== 2017–18 East European Cup (XC) ===
- November 20 – 24, 2017: Khakasia Cup in (Russia) Vershina Tea
  - Men's 10 km Classic winner: (Russia) Stanislav Volzhentsev
  - Women's 5 km Classic winner: (Russia) Svetlana Nikolaeva
  - Men's 1.7 km Speed Freestyle winner: (Russia) Andrey Parfenov
  - Women's 1.3 km Speed Freestyle winner: (Russia) Tatiana Aleshina
  - Men's 1.7 km Classic winner: (Russia) Ermil Vokuev
  - Women's 1.3 km Classic winner: (Russia) Polina Nekrasova
  - Men's 15 km Freestyle winner: (Russia) Artem Nikolaev
  - Women's 10 km Freestyle winner: (Russia) Daria Storozhilova
- December 20 – 22, 2017: EEC #2 in (Ukraine) Syanki
  - 1,6 km Sprint Freestyle winners: (Belarus) Aliaksandr Saladkou (m) / (Ukraine) Darya Blashko (f)
  - Men's 10 km Freestyle winner: (Bulgaria) Veselin Tzinzov
  - Women's 5 km Freestyle winner: (Ukraine) Maryna Antsybor
  - Men's 10 km Classic winner: (Bulgaria) Veselin Tzinzov
  - Women's 5 km Classic winner: (Ukraine) Tetyana Antypenko
- December 23 – 27, 2017: EEC #3 in (Russia) Krasnogorsk
  - Event cancelled.
- January 8 – 12: EEC #4 in (Belarus) Raubichi/Minsk
  - Event cancelled.
- February 9: EEC #5 in (Russia) Krasnogorsk
  - Men's 10 km Classic winner: (Russia) Maxim Vylegzhanin
  - Women's 5 km Classic winner: (Russia) Polina Kalsina
- February 11: EEC #6 in (Russia) Moscow
  - 1.4 km Freestyle winners: (Russia) Gleb Retivykh (m) / (Russia) Natalya Matveyeva (f)
- February 24 – 28: EEC #7 in (Russia) Kononovskaya
  - Men's 15 km Freestyle winner: (Russia) Artem Maltsev
  - Women's 10 km Freestyle winner: (Russia) Mariya Istomina
  - Men's 1.4 km Classic winner: (Russia) Gleb Retivykh
  - Women's 1.2 km Classic winner: (Russia) Natalya Matveyeva
  - Men's Skiathlon winner: (Russia) Stanislav Volzhentsev
  - Women's Skiathlon winner: (Russia) Polina Kalsina

=== 2017–18 Far East Cross Country Cup (XC) ===
- December 26 & 27, 2017: FAC #1 in (Japan) Otoineppu
  - Men's 10 km Classic winners: (Japan) Keishin Yoshida (#1) / (Japan) Naoto Baba (#2)
  - Women's 5 km Classic winners: (Japan) Masako Ishida (2 times)
- January 6 & 7: FAC #2 & #3 in (Japan) Sapporo
  - Men's 10 km Classic winner: (Japan) Hiroyuki Miyazawa
  - Women's 5 km Classic winner: (Japan) Masako Ishida
  - 1.4 Sprint Classic winners: (Japan) Hiroyuki Miyazawa (m) / (Japan) Kozue Takizawa (f)
- January 11 & 12: FAC #4 in (South Korea) Alpensia Resort
  - Men's 10 km Classic winner: (Japan) Hiroyuki Miyazawa
  - Women's 5 km Classic winner: (South Korea) Lee Chae-won
  - Men's 10 km Freestyle winner: (Japan) Hiroyuki Miyazawa
  - Women's 5 km Freestyle winner: (South Korea) Lee Chae-won

=== 2017–18 Scandinavian Cup (XC) ===
- December 15 – 17, 2017: SCAN #1 in (Finland) Vuokatti
  - Men's 15 km Sprint Freestyle winner: (Norway) Daniel Stock
  - Women's 10 km Sprint Freestyle winner: (Norway) Tiril Udnes Weng
  - Sprint Freestyle winners: (Norway) Sindre Bjørnestad Skar (m) / (Norway) Tiril Udnes Weng (f)
  - Men's 15 km Classic winner: (Finland) Ristomatti Hakola
  - Women's 10 km Classic winner: (Finland) Johanna Matintalo
- January 5 – 7: SCAN #2 in (Sweden) Piteå
  - 1 km Sprint Classic winners: (Norway) Eirik Brandsdal (m) / (Norway) Lotta Udnes Weng (f)
  - Men's 15 km Freestyle winner: (Norway) Eirik Sverdrup Augdal
  - Women's 10 km Freestyle winner: (Sweden) Charlotte Kalla
  - Men's 30 km Classic Must Start winner: (Norway) Mattis Stenshagen
  - Women's 20 km Classic Must Start winner: (Finland) Johanna Matintalo
- February 23 – 25: SCAN #3 in (Norway) Trondheim
  - Men's 1.5 km Sprint Freestyle winner: (Norway) Sindre Bjørnestad Skar
  - Women's 1.3 km Sprint Freestyle winner: (Norway) Anne Kjersti Kalvå
  - Men's 10 km Classic winner: (Norway) Paal Golberg
  - Women's 5 km Classic winner: (Norway) Thea Krokan Murud
  - Men's 15 km Freestyle Pursuit winner: (Norway) Magne Haga
  - Women's 10 km Freestyle Pursuit winner: (Norway) Tiril Udnes Weng

=== 2017–18 Slavic Cup (XC) ===
- December 16 & 17, 2017: SC #1 (Tatra Cup) in (Slovakia) Štrbské pleso
  - Men's 1.6 km Classic winner: (Slovakia) Peter Mlynár
  - Women's 1.4 km Classic winner: (Ukraine) Kateryna Serdyuk
  - Men's 10 km Freestyle winner: (Slovakia) Peter Mlynár
  - Women's 7.5 km Freestyle winner: (Ukraine) Tetyana Antypenko
- December 29 & 30, 2017: SC #2 (Memoriál 24 padlých hrdinov SNP) in (Slovakia) Štrbské pleso
  - 1.6 km Sprint Freestyle winners: (Poland) Kamil Bury (m) / (Poland) Justyna Kowalczyk (f)
  - Men's 15 km Classic winner: (Belarus) Yury Astapenka
  - Women's 10 km Classic winner: (Poland) Justyna Kowalczyk
- March 3 & 4: SC #3 in (Poland) Wisla
  - 1.5 km Classic winners: (Poland) Mateusz Haratyk (m) / (Poland) Eliza Rucka (f)
  - Men's 15 km Freestyle winner: (Poland) Mateusz Haratyk
  - Women's 10 km Freestyle winner: (Poland) Eliza Rucka

=== 2018 FIS Balkan Cup (XC) ===
- January 13 & 14: BC #1 in (Croatia) Ravna Gora
  - Note: Here Sprint Freestyle competitions is cancelled.
  - 2.5 Freestyle winners: (Croatia) Edi Dadić (m) / (Bulgaria) Antoniya Grigorova-Burgova (f)
  - Men's 10 km Classic winner: (Bulgaria) Yordan Chuchuganov
  - Women's 5 km Classic winner: (Slovenia) Anja Žavbi Kunaver
- January 19 – 21: BC #2 in (Turkey) Erzurum
  - Men's 10 km Classic winners: (Croatia) Edi Dadić (2 times)
  - Women's 5 km Classic winners: (Bulgaria) Antoniya Grigorova-Burgova (#1) / (Bulgaria) Nansi Okoro (#2)
  - Men's 10 km Freestyle winner: (Serbia) Damir Rastić
  - Women's 5 km Freestyle winner: (Czech Republic) Sandra Schuetzova
- February 3 & 4: BC #3 in (Greece) Naousa
  - Men's 10 km Freestyle winners: (Romania) Florin Robert Dolhăscu (#1) / (Romania) Petrică Hogiu (#2)
  - Women's 5 km Freestyle winners: (Greece) Maria Danou (#1) / (Bulgaria) Nansi Okoro (#2)
- February 28 & March 1: BC #4 in (Serbia) Zlatibor
  - 1.2 Freestyle winners: (Bulgaria) Nikolay Viyachev (m) / (Bulgaria) Nansi Okoro (f)
  - Men's 10 km Freestyle winner: (Serbia) Damir Rastić
  - Women's 5 km Freestyle winner: (Bulgaria) Nansi Okoro

=== 2017–18 Cross Country Continental Cup (XC) ===
- December 9 & 10, 2017: OPA #1 in (France) Les Tuffes
  - Note: The second set of 15 km and 10 km cross country events here was cancelled, due to heavy snow.
  - Men's 15 km winners: (France) Ivan Perrillat Boiteux (#1)
  - Women's 10 km winners: (Czech Republic) Kateřina Beroušková (#1)
- December 15 – 17, 2017: OPA #2 in (Austria) St. Ulrich/Pillersee Valley
  - Men's 1.4 km Sprint Freestyle winner: (United States) Simi Hamilton
  - Women's 1.2 km Sprint Freestyle winner: (United States) Sophie Caldwell
  - Men's 10 km Classic winner: (France) Alexis Jeannerod
  - Women's 5 km Classic winner: (Russia) Elena Soboleva
  - Men's 15 km Freestyle Must Start winner: (Switzerland) Beda Klee
  - Women's 10 km Freestyle Must Start winner: (Germany) Julia Belger
- January 5 – 7: OPA #3 in (Switzerland) Campra
  - Men's 1.6 km Sprint Classic winner: (Italy) Maicol Rastelli
  - Women's 1.4 km Sprint Classic winner: (Germany) Anne Winkler
  - Men's 15 km Freestyle winner: (France) Clément Arnault
  - Women's 10 km Freestyle winner: (Italy) Sara Pellegrini
  - Skiathlon winners: (Italy) Sergio Rigoni (m) / (Italy) Sara Pellegrini (f)
- February 16 – 18: OPA #4 in (Germany) Zwiesel
  - Men's 1.8 km Sprint Classic winner: (Italy) Giacomo Gabrielli
  - Women's 1.6 km Sprint Classic winner: (Germany) Laura Gimmler
  - Men's 15 km Classic winner: (France) Valentin Chauvin
  - Women's 10 km Classic winner: (Germany) Antonia Fraebel
  - Men's 20 km Freestyle Must Start winner: (France) Robin Duvillard
  - Women's 10 km Freestyle Must Start winner: (Germany) Antonia Fraebel
- March 3 & 4: OPA #5 in (Italy) Cogne
  - Men's 15 km Classic winner: (France) Adrien Backscheider
  - Women's 10 km Classic winner: (United States) Rosie Frankowski
  - 15 km Freestyle Pursuit winners: (France) Adrien Backscheider (m) / (United States) Rosie Frankowski

=== 2017 FIS Australia & New Zealand Cup (CC) ===
- July 22 & 23: ANZC #1 in (Australia) Perisher Valley
  - 1 km Freestyle speed: (Australia) Phillip Bellingham (m) / (Slovenia) Barbara Jezeršek (f)
  - Men's 10 km Classic winner: (Switzerland) Philippe Nicollier
  - Women's 5 km Classic winner: (Australia) Katerina Paul
- August 19 & 20: ANZC #2 in (Australia) Falls Creek (part of Australian Cross Country Skiing Championships)
  - 1 km Classic winners: (Australia) Phillip Bellingham (m) / (Slovenia) Barbara Jezeršek (f)
  - Men's 15 km Freestyle winner: (Australia) Phillip Bellingham
  - Women's 10 km Freestyle winner: (Slovenia) Barbara Jezeršek
- September 7 – 9: ANZC #3 in (New Zealand) Snow Farm
  - Men's 10 km Freestyle winner: (United States) Benjamin Lustgarten
  - Women's 5 km Freestyle winner: (United States) Jessie Diggins
  - 1.6 km Sprint Classic winners: (United States) Ben Saxton (m) / (United States) Sophie Caldwell (f)
  - Men's 15 km Classic Mass Start winner: (United States) Benjamin Lustgarten
  - Women's 10 km Classic Mass Start winner: (United States) Jessie Diggins

=== 2017–18 USA Super Tour (XC) ===
- December 2 & 3, 2017: UST #1 in (United States) Rendezvous Ski Trails
  - 1,3 km Sprint Freestyle winners: (United States) Nick Michaud (m) / (United States) Annie Hart (f)
  - Men's 15 km Classic winner: (United States) Brian Gregg
  - Women's 10 km Classic winner: (Sweden) Hedda Bångman
- January 26 – 28: UST #2 in (United States) Craftsbury
  - 1,3 Sprint Classic winners: (United States) Forrest Mahlen (m) / (United States) Kaitlynn Miller (f)
  - Men's Individual 10 km Freestyle winner: (United States) David Norris
  - Women's Individual 5 km Freestyle winner: (United States) Becca Rorabaugh
- February 15 – 18: UST #3 in (United States) Al Quaal Recreation Area
  - 1,6 km Sprint Freestyle winners: (United States) Kevin Bolger (m) / (Norway) Anikken Gjerde-Alnaes (f)
  - Men's 20 km Freestyle Must Start winner: (United States) David Norris
  - Women's 15 km Freestyle Must Start winner: (United States) Chelsea Holmes
  - Men's 10 km Classic winner: (United States) David Norris
  - Women's 5 km Classic winner: (United States) Kaitlynn Miller

=== 2017–18 North American Cup (XC) ===
- December 9 & 10: NAC #1 in (Canada) Vernon
  - 1,3 km Classic winners: (Canada) Bob Thompson (m) / (United States) Kaitlynn Miller (f)
  - Men's 15 km Classic winner: (United States) Ian Torchia
  - Women's 10 km Classic winner: (United States) Caitlin Patterson
- December 15 – 17: NAC #2 in (Canada) Rossland
  - Men's 10 km Classic winner: (United States) Brian Gregg
  - Women's 5 km Classic winner: (United States) Caitlin Compton Gregg
  - 1,3 km Freestyle winners: (Canada) Julien Locke (m) / (Canada) Zina Kocher (f)
  - Men's 15 km Freestyle Pursuit winner: (United States) Brian Gregg
  - Women's 10 km Freestyle Pursuit winner: (United States) Caitlin Compton Gregg
- January 5 – 10: NAC #3 in (Canada) Mont-Sainte-Anne
  - Sprint Classique winners: (Canada) Julien Locke (m) / (Canada) Dahria Beatty (f)
  - Skiathlon winners: (Canada) Knute Johnsgaard (m) / (Canada) Cendrine Browne (f)
  - Sprint Freestyle winners: (Canada) Jesse Cockney (m) / (Canada) Dahria Beatty (f)
  - Men's Individual 15 km winner: (Canada) Ricardo Izquierdo-Bernier
  - Women's Individual 10 km winner: (Canada) Cendrine Browne
- January 19 – 21: NAC #4 in (Canada) Red Deer, Alberta
  - 1.2 km Sprint Freestryle winners: (Canada) Jesse Cockney (m) / (Canada) Olivia Bouffard-Nesbitt (f)
  - Men's 15 km Classic Must Start winner: (Canada) Andy Shields
  - Women's 10 km Classic Must Start winner: (Canada) Annika Hicks
- February 2 – 4: NAC #5 in (Canada) Nakkertok
  - 1,4 km Classic winners: (United States) Benjamin Saxton (m) / (United States) Becca Rorabaugh (f)
  - Men's 15 km Freestyle winner: (United States) John Hegman
  - Women's 10 km Freestyle winner: (United States) Rosie Frankowski
  - Men's 15 km Classic Pursuit winner: (United States) David Norris
  - Women's 10 km Classic Pursuit winner: (United States) Rosie Frankowski

=== 2017 FIS Roller Skiing World Cup & 2017 FIS Roller Skiing Junior World Cup ===
- July 7 – 9: RSWC #1 & RSJWC #1 in (Croatia) Oroslavje
  - Men's 16 km Freestyle Must Start: (Italy) Emanuele Becchis
  - Women's 12 km Freestyle Must Start: (Italy) Lisa Bolzan
  - Men's Junior 16 km Freestyle Must Start: (Italy) Francesco Becchis
  - Women's Junior 12 km Freestyle Must Start: (Germany) Anna-Maria Dietze
  - 7 km Cross Uphill winners: (Sweden) Robin Norum (m) / (Sweden) Sandra Olsson (f)
  - Junior 7 km Cross Uphill winners: (Sweden) Hugo Jacobsson (m) / (Sweden) Kristina Axelsson (f)
  - 0.2 km Speed Freestyle winners: (Russia) Dmitriy Voronin (m) / (Italy) Anna Bolzan (f)
  - Junior 0.2 km Speed Freestyle winners: (Germany) Nico Rieckhoff (m) / (Italy) Anna Bolzan (f)
- August 3 – 6: RSWC #2 & RSJWC #2 in Sollefteå (part of 2017 FIS Rollerski World Championships)
  - Men's 22.5 km Freestyle winner: (Sweden) Anders Svanebo
  - Women's 18 km Freestyle winner: (Sweden) Linn Sömskar
  - Men's Junior 18 km Freestyle winner: (Russia) Alexander Grigoriev
  - Women's Junior 13.5 km Freestyle winner: (Russia) Anna Zherebyateva
  - 0.2 km Freestyle winners: (Italy) Emanuele Becchis (m) / (Russia) Olga Letucheva (f)
  - Junior 0.2 km Freestyle winners: (Sweden) Adam Persson (m) / (Italy) Alba Mortagna (f)
  - Men's 20 km Freestyle Must Start: (Russia) Alexander Bolshunov
  - Women's 16 km Freestyle Must Start: (Sweden) Linn Sömskar
  - Men's Junior 16 km Freestyle Must Start: (Sweden) Leo Johansson
  - Women's Junior 12 km Freestyle Must Start: (Russia) Anna Zherebyateva
  - Team Sprint Freestyle winners: Norway (Even Sæteren Hippe, Ragnar Bragvin Andresen) (m) / Sweden (Maja Dahlqvist, Linn Sömskar) (f)
  - Junior Team Sprint Freestyle winners: Italy (Mattia Armellini, Francesco Becchis) (m) / Norway Kristin Austgulen Fosnæs, Amalie Honerud Olsen)
- August 11 – 13: RSWC #3 & RSJWC #3 in (Latvia) Madona
  - 0.2 km Speed winners: (Italy) Emanuele Becchis (m) / (Slovakia) Alena Procházková (f)
  - Junior 0.2 km Speed winners: (Russia) Dmitriy Karakosov (m) / (Italy) Alba Mortagna (f)
  - Men's 7.5 km Classic winner: (Sweden) Robin Norum
  - Men's Junior 7.5 km Classic winner: (Sweden) Gabriel Strid
  - Women's 5 km Classic winner: (Slovakia) Alena Procházková
  - Women's Junior 5 km Classic winner: (Ukraine) Yuliia Krol
  - Men's 15 km Freestyle Pursuit winner: (Sweden) Robin Norum
  - Men's Junior 15 km Freestyle Pursuit winner: (Latvia) Raimo Vigants
  - Women's 10 km Freestyle Pursuit winner: (Slovakia) Alena Procházková
  - Women's Junior 10 km Freestyle Pursuit winner: (Ukraine) Yuliia Krol
  - Overall Standing winners: (Sweden) Robin Norum (m) / (Slovakia) Alena Procházková (f)
  - Overall Standing Junior winners: (Latvia) Raimo Vigants (m) / (Ukraine) Yuliia Krol (f)
- September 8 – 10: RSWC #4 & RSJWC #4 in (Italy) Trento/Monte Bondone
  - 0.165 km Sprint Freestyle winners: (Italy) Emanuele Becchis (m) / (Slovakia) Alena Procházková (f)
  - Junior 0.165 km Sprint Freestyle winners: (Latvia) Raimo Vigants (m) / (Italy) Alba Mortagna (f)
  - Men's 8.5 km Classic winner: (Andorra) Irineu Esteve Altimiras
  - Women's 4.7 km Classic winner: (Sweden) Helene Söderlund
  - Juniors 4.7 km Classic winners: (Italy) Luca Curti (m) / (Italy) Chiara Becchis (f)
  - Men's 10.8 km Freestyle Pursuit winner: (Romania) Paul Constantin Pepene
  - Women's 6.9 km Freestyle Pursuit winner: (Sweden) Helene Söderlund
  - Juniors 6.9 km Freestyle Pursuit winners: (Sweden) Gabriel Strid (m) / (Sweden) Hanna Abrahamsson (f)

== Freestyle skiing ==
=== 2018 Winter Olympics (Freestyle) ===
- February 9 – 23: Freestyle skiing at the 2018 Winter Olympics
  - Men's Aerials winners: (gold) (Ukraine) Oleksandr Abramenko; (silver) (China) Jia Zongyang; (bronze) (International Olympic Committee) Ilya Burov
  - Women's Aerials winners: (gold) (Belarus) Hanna Huskova; (silver) (China) Zhang Xin; (bronze) (China) Kong Fanyu
  - Men's Halfpipe winners: (gold) (United States) David Wise; (silver) (United States) Alex Ferreira; (bronze) (New Zealand) Nico Porteous
  - Women's Halfpipe winners: (gold) (Canada) Cassie Sharpe; (silver) (France) Marie Martinod; (bronze) (United States) Brita Sigourney
  - Men's Moguls winners: (gold) (Canada) Mikaël Kingsbury; (silver) (Australia) Matt Graham; (bronze) (Japan) Daichi Hara
  - Women's Moguls winners: (gold) (France) Perrine Laffont; (silver) (Canada) Justine Dufour-Lapointe; (bronze) (Kazakhstan) Yuliya Galysheva
  - Men's Slopestyle winners: (gold) (Norway) Øystein Bråten; (silver) (United States) Nick Goepper; (bronze) (Canada) Alex Beaulieu-Marchand
  - Women's Slopestyle winners: (gold) (Switzerland) Sarah Höfflin; (silver) (Switzerland) Mathilde Gremaud; (bronze) (United Kingdom) Isabel Atkin
  - Men's Ski Cross winners: (gold) (Canada) Brady Leman; (silver) (Switzerland) Marc Bischofberger; (bronze) (International Olympic Committee) Sergey Ridzik
  - Women's Ski Cross winners: (gold) (Canada) Kelsey Serwa; (silver) (Canada) Brittany Phelan; (bronze) (Switzerland) Fanny Smith

=== World and Continental events ===
- March 2: 2018 Asian Cup (Halfpipe) in (South Korea) Pyeongchang
  - Halfpipe winners: (South Korea) Lee Kang-bok (m) / (South Korea) Jang Yu-jin (f)
- FIS Junior Freestyle Ski World Championships

=== 2017–18 FIS Freestyle Skiing World Cup ===
- August 26, 2017 – March 25, 2018: 2017–18 FIS Freestyle Skiing World Cup Schedule

Moguls and Aerials

- December 9, 2017: MAWC #1 in (Finland) Rukatunturi (Kuusamo)
  - Moguls winners: (Canada) Mikaël Kingsbury (m) / (Australia) Britteny Cox (f)
- December 16 & 17, 2017: MAWC #2 in Genting Resort Secret Garden (Chongli District. Zhangjiakou)
  - Men's aerials winner: (China) Jia Zongyang (2 times)
  - Women's aerials winners: (Belarus) Hanna Huskova (#1) / (Australia) Danielle Scott (#2)
  - Team aerials winners: China (Xu Mengtao, Qi Guangpu, & Jia Zongyang)
- December 21 & 22, 2017: MAWC #3 in (China) Thaiwoo (Chongli District, Zhangjiakou)
  - Men's moguls winner: (Canada) Mikaël Kingsbury (2 times)
  - Women's moguls winners: (United States) Jaelin Kauf (#1) / (Kazakhstan) Yuliya Galysheva (#2)
- January 6: MAWC #4 in (Russia) Moscow
  - Aerials winners: (Belarus) Anton Kushnir (m) / (United States) Kiley McKinnon (f)
- January 6: MAWC #5 in (Canada) Calgary
  - Moguls winners: (Canada) Mikaël Kingsbury (m) / (Australia) Britteny Cox (f)
- January 10 – 12: MAWC #6 in (United States) Deer Valley
  - Men's moguls winner: (Canada) Mikaël Kingsbury (2 times)
  - Women's moguls winners: (France) Perrine Laffont (#1) / (United States) Jaelin Kauf (#2)
  - Aerials winners: (Russia) Maxim Burov (m) / (China) Xu Mengtao (f)
- January 19 & 20: MAWC #7 in (United States) Lake Placid, New York
  - Men's aerials winners: (China) Jia Zongyang (#1) / (Russia) Maxim Burov (#2)
  - Women's aerials winners: (Australia) Lydia Lassila (#1) / (China) Xu Mengtao (#2)
- January 20: MAWC #8 in (Canada) Mont Tremblant Resort
  - Moguls winners: (Japan) Ikuma Horishima (m) / (Canada) Justine Dufour-Lapointe (f)
- March 3 & 4: MAWC #9 in (Japan) Tazawako
  - Moguls winners: (Japan) Ikuma Horishima (m) / (France) Perrine Laffont (f)
  - Dual moguls winners: (Japan) Ikuma Horishima (m) / (United States) Tess Johnson (f)
- March 10: MAWC #10 in (Switzerland) Airolo
  - Event cancelled.
- March 18: MAWC #11 (final) in (France) Megève
  - Dual moguls winners: (Canada) Mikaël Kingsbury (m) / (United States) Jaelin Kauf (f)

Half-pipe, Big air, and Slopestyle

- August 26 – September 1, 2017: HB&SWC #1 in (New Zealand) Cardrona Alpine Resort
  - Slopestyle winners: (United Kingdom) James Woods (m) / (Estonia) Kelly Sildaru (f)
  - Half-pipe winners: (United States) Alex Ferreira (m) / (Canada) Cassie Sharpe (f)
- November 3, 2017: HB&SWC #2 in (Denmark) Copenhagen
  - Event cancelled.
- November 18, 2017: HB&SWC #3 in (Italy) Milan
  - Big Air winners: (Switzerland) Elias Ambühl (m) / (France) Coline Ballet Baz (f)
- November 24 – 26, 2017: HB&SWC #4 in (Austria) Stubai Alps
  - Slopestyle winners: (Norway) Øystein Bråten (m) / (Sweden) Jennie-Lee Burmansson (f)
- December 1, 2017: HB&SWC #5 in (Germany) Mönchengladbach
  - Big Air winners: (Norway) Christian Nummedal (m) / (Switzerland) Giulia Tanno (f)
- December 6 & 8, 2017: HB&SWC #6 in (United States) Copper Mountain
  - Half-pipe winners: (United States) David Wise (m) / (France) Marie Martinod (f)
- December 20 & 22, 2017: HB&SWC #7 in (China) Genting Resort Secret Garden (Chongli District, Zhangjiakou)
  - Half-pipe winners: (France) Thomas Krief (m) / (China) ZHANG Kexin (f)
- December 21 – 23, 2017: HB&SWC #8 in (France) Font-Romeu
  - Slopestyle winners: (Sweden) Oscar Wester (m) / (France) Tess Ledeux (f)
- January 10 – 13: HB&SWC #9 in (United States) Snowmass
  - Half-pipe winners: (United States) David Wise (m) / (Canada) Cassie Sharpe (f)
  - Slopestyle winners: (Switzerland) Andri Ragettli (m) / (Norway) Johanne Killi (f)
- January 17 – 21: HB&SWC #10 in (United States) Mammoth Mountain Ski Area
  - Half-pipe winners: (United States) Kyle Smaine (m) / (United States) Brita Sigourney (f)
  - Slopestyle winners: (Canada) Teal Harle (m) / (Norway) Tiril Sjåstad Christiansen (f)
- March 2 & 3: HB&SWC #11 in (Switzerland) Silvaplana
  - Slopestyle winners: (United States) Alexander Hall (m) / (France) Tess Ledeux (f)
- March 14 & 16: HB&SWC #12 in (Italy) Seiser Alm
  - Slopestyle winners: (United States) Nicholas Goepper (m) / (United States) Caroline Claire (f)
- March 21 & 22: HB&SWC #13 in (France) Tignes
  - Half-pipe winners: (Canada) Noah Bowman (m) / (Canada) Cassie Sharpe (f)
- March 22 & 24: HB&SWC #14 (final) in (Canada) Stoneham Mountain Resort
  - Note: The slopestyle event here has been cancelled.
  - Big Air winners: (Norway) Christian Nummedal (m) / (Canada) Dara Howell (f)

Ski cross

- December 7 & 9, 2017: SCWC #1 in (France) Val Thorens
  - Note: The second set of ski cross events here was cancelled, due to heavy snow.
  - Ski cross winners: (Canada) Christopher Del Bosco (m) / (Sweden) Sandra Näslund (f)
- December 12, 2017: SCWC #2 in (Switzerland) Arosa
  - Ski cross winners: (Sweden) Viktor Andersson (m) / (Sweden) Sandra Näslund (f)
- December 15, 2017: SCWC #3 in (Austria) Montafon
  - Ski cross winners: (Russia) Sergey Ridzik (m) / (Switzerland) Fanny Smith (f)
- December 20 – 22, 2017: SCWC #4 in (Italy) Innichen
  - Men's ski cross winner: (Switzerland) Marc Bischofberger (2 times)
  - Women's ski cross winners: (Germany) Heidi Zacher (#1) / (Sweden) Sandra Näslund (#2)
- January 12 – 14: SCWC #5 in (Sweden) Idre
  - Men's ski cross winners: (Switzerland) Alex Fiva (#1) / (France) Jean-Frédéric Chapuis (#2)
  - Women's ski cross winner: (Sweden) Sandra Näslund (2 times)
- January 19 & 20: SCWC #6 in (Canada) Nakiska
  - Ski cross winners: (Germany) Paul Eckert (m) / (Sweden) Sandra Näslund (f)
- March 2 – 4: SCWC #7 (final) in (Russia) Sunny Valley Ski Resort (Miass)
  - Men's ski cross winners: (Switzerland) Jonas Lenherr (#1) / (Canada) Kevin Drury (#2)
  - Women's ski cross winners: (Switzerland) Fanny Smith (#1) / (Sweden) Sandra Näslund (#2)
- March 17: SCWC #8 in (France) Megève
  - Event cancelled.

=== 2017–18 European Cup (FS) ===
- November 26, 2017: ECFS #1 in (Austria) St. Leonhard im Pitztal
  - Ski Cross winners: (Switzerland) Jonas Lenherr (m) / (Canada) Georgia Simmerling (f)
- December 1 & 2, 2017: ECFS #2 in (Finland) Rukatunturi (Super Continental Cup)
  - Men's Aerials winners: (Ukraine) Oleksandr Abramenko (2 times)
  - Women's Aerials winners: (Australia) Laura Peel (#1) / (Australia) Danielle Scott (#2)
- December 9 – 16, 2017: ECFS #3 in (Austria) Kaprun
  - Halfpipe winners: (Austria) Lukas Müllauer (m) / (Austria) Elisabeth Gram (f)
  - Slopestyle winners: (Norway) Petter Ulsletten (m) / (Norway) Sandra Moestue Eie (f)
- December 21 – 23, 2017: ECFS #4 in (France) Val Thorens
  - Men's Ski Cross winners: (Germany) Cornel Renn (#1) / (Switzerland) Ryan Regez (#2)
  - Women's Ski Cross winners: (Switzerland) Zoé Cheli (2 times)
- January 17 – 20: ECFS #4 in (France) Megève
  - Men's Moguls winners: (Sweden) Oskar Elofsson (2 times)
  - Women's Moguls winners: (Sweden) Clara Månsson (2 times)
  - Dual Moguls winners: (Sweden) Oskar Elofsson (m) / (Russia) Ksenia Kuznetsova (f)
- January 19 & 20: ECFS #5 in (Sweden) Idre Fjäll
  - Men's Ski Cross winners: (Germany) Franz Pietzko (2 times)
  - Women's Ski Cross winners: (Sweden) Alexandra Edebo (2 times)
- January 25 & 26: ECFS #6 in (Switzerland) Lenk im Simmental
  - Men's Ski Cross winners: (Switzerland) Ryan Regez (2 times)
  - Women's Ski Cross winners: (Sweden) Alexandra Edebo (2 times)
- January 26 – 28: ECFS #7 in (Austria) St Anton am Arlberg
  - Event was cancelled.
- January 31 – February 1: ECFS #8 in (Russia) Krasnoe Ozero
  - Moguls winners: (Russia) Andrey Uglovski (m) / (Russia) Anastasiia Smirnova (f)
  - Dual Moguls winners: (Sweden) Oskar Elofsson (m) / (Russia) Anastasiia Smirnova (f)
- January 31 – February 3: ECFS #9 in (France) St. Francois
  - Men's Ski Cross winners: (France) Jean-Frédéric Chapuis (#1) / (France) Morgan Guipponi Barfety (#2)
  - Women's Ski Cross winners: (France) Alizée Baron (2 times)
- February 4 & 5: ECFS #10 in (Finland) Jyväskylä
  - Moguls winners: (Finland) Topi Kanninen (m) / (Russia) Ksenia Kuznetsova (f)
  - Dual Moguls winners: (Sweden) Oskar Elofsson (m) / (Sweden) Frida Lundblad (f)
- February 6 & 7: ECFS #11 in (France) Méribel
  - Slopestyle winners: (Spain) Javier Lliso (m) / (Norway) Tora Johansen (f)
- February 10 & 11: ECFS #12 in (Sweden) Åre
  - Moguls winners: (Finland) Topi Kanninen (m) / (Sweden) Clara Månsson (f)
  - Dual Moguls winners: (Sweden) Loke Nilsson (m) / (Russia) Ksenia Kuznetsova (f)
- February 16 – 18: ECFS #13 in Minsk
  - Men's Aerials winners: (Belarus) Dzmitry Mazurkevich (#1) / (Belarus) Pavel Dzik (#2) / (Russia) Kirill Samorodov (#3)
  - Women's Aerials winners: (Switzerland) Carol Bouvard (#1 & #3) / (Germany) Emma Weiß (#2)
  - Team Aerials winners: Belarus 2 (Denis Osipau, Artsiom Bashlakou, Yana Yarmashevich)
- February 23 – 25: ECFS #14 in (Switzerland) Davos
  - Big Air winners: (Switzerland) Kim Gubser (m) / (Italy) Sophia Insam (f)
  - Halfpipe winners: (Switzerland) Mario Grob (m) / (Netherlands) Isabelle Hanssen (f)
- February 24 & 25: ECFS #15 in (Germany) Grasgehren
  - Men's Ski Cross winners: (Switzerland) Ryan Regez (2 times)
  - Women's Ski Cross winners: (Sweden) Alexandra Edebo (#1) / (Canada) Abby McEwen (#2)
- March 1 – 3: ECFS #16 in (Germany) Mittenwald
  - Men's Ski Cross winners: (Switzerland) Ryan Regez (2 times)
  - Women's Ski Cross winners: (Canada) Zoe Chore (#1) / (Sweden) Alexandra Edebo (#2)
- March 2 & 3: ECFS #17 in (Germany) Götschen
  - Big Air winners: (Austria) Hannes Rudigier (m) / (Italy) Sophia Insam (f)
- March 3 & 4: ECFS #18 in (Austria) Krispl
  - Men's Moguls winners: (Sweden) Oskar Elofsson (#1) / (Russia) Nikita Novitckii (#2)
  - Women's Moguls winners: (Sweden) Frida Lundblad (2 times)

=== 2017–18 North American Cup (FS) ===
- December 15 & 16, 2017: NAC #1 in (United States) Copper Mountain
  - Men's Halfpipe winners: (United States) Cassidy Jarrell (#1) / (United States) Hunter Hess (#2)
  - Women's Halfpipe winners: (United States) Abigale Hansen (2 times)
- December 16 & 17, 2017: NAC #2 in (United States) Utah Olympic Park
  - Men's Aerials winners: (United States) Justin Schoenefeld (#1) / (United States) Zachary Surdell (#2)
  - Women's Aerials winners: (United States) Karena Elliott (#1) / (United States) Madison Varmette (#2)
- January 21 – 23: NAC #3 in (Canada) Nakiska
  - Men's Ski Cross winners: (Canada) Reece Howden (2 times)
  - Women's Ski Cross winners: (Japan) Reina Umehara (2 times)
- January 27 & 28: NAC #4 in (Canada) Val Saint-Côme
  - Moguls winners: (Canada) Kerrian Chunlaud (m) / (Canada) Berkley Brown (f)
  - Dual Moguls winners: (United States) Dylan Walczyk (m) / (United States) Avital Shimko (f)
- February 3 & 4: NAC #5 in (United States) Killington Ski Resort
  - Moguls winners: (United States) Dylan Walczyk (m) / (Canada) Valerie Gilbert (f)
  - Dual Moguls winners: (United States) Dylan Walczyk (m) / (United States) Avital Shimko (f)
- February 9 – 11: NAC #6 in (Canada) Calgary
  - Slopestyle winners: (Canada) Philippe Langevin (m) / (Canada) Megan Oldham (f)
  - Men's Halfpipe winners: (United States) Birk Irving (2 times)
  - Women's Halfpipe winners: (United States) Abigale Hansen (#1) / (United States) Carly Margulies (#2)
- February 12 – 15: NAC #7 in (United States) Sunday River
  - Men's Ski Cross winners: (Canada) Reece Howden (#1) / (Canada) Mathieu Leduc (#2)
  - Women's Ski Cross winners: (Canada) Tiana Gairns (2 times)
- February 17 & 18: NAC #8 in (United States) Lake Placid
  - Event was cancelled.
- February 17 – 19: NAC #9 in (Canada) Calabogie Peaks
  - Men's Ski Cross winners: (United States) Brant Crossan (#1) / (Canada) Zach Belczyk (#2)
  - Women's Ski Cross winners: (Canada) Zoe Chore (#1) / (Canada) Abby McEwen (#2)
- February 23 & 24: NAC #10 in (Canada) Le Relais, QC
  - Men's Aerials winners: (United States) Justin Schoenefeld (2 times)
  - Women's Aerials winners: (United States) Kaila Kuhn (2 times)
- February 22 – 24: NAC #11 in (United States) Aspen / Buttermilk
  - Big Air winners: (Canada) Noah Morrison (m) / (United States) Rell Harwood (f)
  - Slopestyle winners: (United States) William Borm (m) / (United States) Marin Hamill (f)
  - Halfpipe winners: (United States) Birk Irving (m) / (United States) Abigale Hansen (f)
- February 24 & 25: NAC #12 in (Canada) Calgary, AB
  - Moguls winners: (Canada) Laurent Dumais (m) / (United States) Avital Shimko (f)
  - Dual Moguls winners: (Canada) Laurent Dumais (m) / (United States) Elizabeth O'Connell (f)
- February 27 – March 4: NAC #13 in (United States) Park City
  - Moguls winners: (United States) Hunter Bailey (m) / (United States) Hannah Soar (f)
  - Dual Moguls winners: (United States) Jesse Andringa (m) / (Canada) Berkley Brown (f)
- March 1 & 2: NAC #14 in (United States) Utah Olympic Park
  - Men's Aerials winners: (United States) Jasper Holcomb (#1) / (United States) Harrison Smith (#2)
  - Women's Aerials winners: (United States) Madison Varmette (#1) / (United States) Kaila Kuhn (#2)

=== 2017 South American Cup (FS) ===
- August 11 & 12: SAC #1 in (Chile) La Parva #1
  - Slopestyle #1 winners: (United States) Alex Hall (m) / (Chile) Melanie Kraizel (f)
  - Slopestyle #2 winners: (United States) Nathan Miceli (m) / (Chile) Dominique Ohaco (f)
- August 24 – 26: SAC #2 in (Chile) La Parva #2
  - This event is cancelled.
- September 17 & 18: SAC #3 in (Argentina) Cerro Catedral
  - Big Air #1 winners: (Argentina) Nahuel Medrano (m) / (Argentina) Josefina Vitiello (f)
  - Big Air #2 winners: (Argentina) Ivan Kuray (m) / (Argentina) Maria Cabanillas (f)

=== 2017 Australia & New Zealand Cup (FS) ===
- July 31 – August 4: ANCFS #1 in (Australia) Mount Buller #1
  - Ski Cross #1 winners: (Australia) Doug Crawford (m) / (Australia) Sami Kennedy-Sim (f)
  - Ski Cross #2 winners: (Australia) Doug Crawford (m) / (Australia) Sami Kennedy-Sim (f)
- August 15 – 17: ANCFS #2 in (New Zealand) Cardrona (part of FIS Continental Cup)
  - Halfpipe winners: (New Zealand) Nico Porteous (m) / (Germany) Sabrina Cakmakli (f)
  - Slopestyle winners: (Norway) Birk Ruud (m) / (South Korea) Mee-hyun Lee (f)
- August 24 – 27: ANCFS #3 in (Australia) Mount Hotham
  - Ski Cross #1 winners: (New Zealand) Jamie Prebble (m) / (Australia) Sami Kennedy-Sim (f)
  - Ski Cross #2 winners: (United States) Tyler Wallasch (m) / (Australia) Sami Kennedy-Sim (f)
- August 29 – 30: ANCFS #4 in (Australia) Perisher Ski Resort
  - Moguls #1 winners: (Australia) Matthew Graham (m) / (France) Perrine Laffont (f)
  - Moguls #2 winners: (Canada) Mikaël Kingsbury (m) / (Australia) Britteny Cox (f)
- September 2: ANCFS #5 in (Australia) Mount Buller #2
  - Dual Moguls winners: (Australia) Matt Graham (m) / (Australia) Nicole Parks (f)

== Nordic combined ==
=== 2018 Winter Olympics (NC) ===
- February 14, 20, & 22: Nordic combined at the 2018 Winter Olympics
  - Men's individual large hill/10 km winners: (gold) (Germany) Johannes Rydzek; (silver) (Germany) Fabian Rießle; (bronze) (Germany) Eric Frenzel
  - Men's individual normal hill/10 km winners: (gold) (Germany) Eric Frenzel; (silver) (Japan) Akito Watabe; (bronze) (Austria) Lukas Klapfer
  - Men's team large hill/4 x 5 km winners: (gold) Germany; (silver) Norway; (bronze) Austria

=== 2018 FIS Junior World Ski Championships ===
- January 30 – February 3: 2018 FIS Junior World Ski Championships (NC) in (Switzerland) Kandersteg-Goms, Valais
  - Men's individual winners: (Czech Republic) Ondrej Pazout (#1) / (Slovenia) Vid Vrhovnik (#2)
  - Men's team winners: Austria (Johannes Lamparter, Florian Dagn, Dominik Terzer, & Mika Vermeulen)

=== 2017–18 FIS Nordic Combined World Cup ===
- November 24 – 26, 2017: NCWC #1 in (Finland) Rukatunturi (Kuusamo)
  - Men's individual winners: (Norway) Espen Andersen (#1) / (Japan) Akito Watabe (#2) / (Germany) Johannes Rydzek (#3)
- December 2 & 3, 2017: NCWC #2 in Lillehammer
  - Men's individual winner: (Norway) Espen Andersen
  - Men's team winners: Norway (Jan Schmid, Espen Andersen, Jarl Magnus Riiber, & Jørgen Graabak)
- December 16 & 17, 2017: NCWC #3 in (Austria) Ramsau am Dachstein
  - Men's individual winners: (Germany) Eric Frenzel (#1) / (Germany) Fabian Rießle (#2)
- January 6 & 7: NCWC #4 in (Estonia) Otepää
  - Event cancelled.
- January 12 – 14: NCWC #5 in (Italy) Fiemme Valley
  - Men's individual winners: (Norway) Jørgen Graabak (#1) / (Norway) Jan Schmid (#2)
  - Men's team winners: Germany (Eric Frenzel & Vinzenz Geiger)
- January 20 & 21: NCWC #6 in (France) Chaux-Neuve
  - Men's individual winner: (Norway) Jan Schmid
  - Men's team winners: Norway (Jan Schmid, Espen Andersen, Jarl Magnus Riiber, & Jørgen Graabak)
- January 26 – 28: NCWC #7 in (Austria) Seefeld in Tirol
  - Men's individual winner: (Japan) Akito Watabe (3 times)
- February 3 & 4: NCWC #8 in (Japan) Hakuba
  - Men's individual winners: (Japan) Akito Watabe (#1) / (Norway) Jan Schmid (#2)
- March 3 & 4: NCWC #9 in (Finland) Lahti
  - Men's individual winner: (Germany) Johannes Rydzek
  - Men's team winners: Austria (Wilhelm Denifl & Bernhard Gruber)
- March 10: NCWC #10 in (Norway) Oslo
  - Men's individual winner: (Japan) Akito Watabe
- March 13 & 14: NCWC #11 in (Norway) Trondheim
  - Men's individual winners: (Germany) Eric Frenzel (#1) / (Germany) Fabian Rießle (#2)
- March 17 & 18: NCWC #12 in (Germany) Klingenthal
  - Men's individual winner: (Germany) Fabian Rießle (2 times)
- March 24 & 25: NCWC #13 (final) in (Germany) Schonach im Schwarzwald
  - Men's individual winner: (Japan) Akito Watabe (2 times)

=== 2017–18 Continental Cup (NK) ===
- December 15 – 27, 2017: CCNK #1 in (United States) Steamboat Springs, Colorado
  - Men's winners: (Finland) Mikko Kokslien (3 times)
- January 5 – 7: CCNK #2 in (Germany) Klingenthal
  - Men's winners: (France) Antoine Gérard (#1) / (Austria) Franz-Josef Rehrl (#2) / (France) François Braud (#3)
- January 6 & 7: CCNK #3 in (Estonia) Otepää
  - This event is cancelled.
- January 12 – 14: CCNK #4 in (Finland) Rukatunturi
  - Men's winners: (Austria) Bernhard Flaschberger (#1) / (Norway) Sindre Ure Søtvik (#2) / (Austria) Thomas Jöbstl (#3)
- January 20 & 21: CCNK #5 in (Norway) Rena
  - Men's winners: (Austria) Thomas Jöbstl (#1) / (Austria) Dominik Terzer (#2)
  - Women's winners: (Russia) Stefaniya Nadymova (#1) / (Japan) Ayane Miyazaki (#2)
- February 3 & 4: CCNK #6 in (Slovenia) Planica
  - Men's winners: (United States) Bryan Fletcher (2 times)
- February 9 – 11: CCNK #7 in (Austria) Eisenerz
  - Men's winners: (Austria) Mika Vermeulen (#1) / (Finland) Mikko Kokslien (#2)
- March 9 – 11: CCNK #8 in (Russia) Nizhny Tagil
  - Men's winners: (Italy) Lukas Runggaldier (#1) / (France) Laurent Muhlethaler (#2)
  - Women's winners: (Russia) Stefaniya Nadymova (2 times)
  - Men's Mass Start winner: (Austria) Bernhard Flaschberger

=== 2017 Grand Prix (NK) ===
- August 19 & 20, 2017: GPNK #1 in (Germany) Oberwiesenthal
  - Men's winner: (Austria) Mario Seidl
  - Team winners: Czech Republic I (Tomáš Portyk, Miroslav Dvořák)
- August 23, 2017: GPNK #2 in (Austria) Tschagguns
  - Men's winner: (Germany) Fabian Rießle
- August 25 & 26, 2017: GPNK #3 in (Germany) Oberstdorf
  - Men's winners: (Germany) Eric Frenzel (#1) / (Austria) Mario Seidl (#2)
- September 30 & October 1, 2017: GPNK #4 in (Slovenia) Planica
  - Men's winners: (Norway) Magnus Moan (2 times)

=== 2017–18 OPA Alpen Cup (NK) ===
Summer

- August 7, 2017: ACNK #1 in (Germany) Klingenthal
  - Women's winner: (Italy) Lena Prinoth
- August 11, 2017: ACNK #2 in (Germany) Bischofsgrün
  - Women's winner: (Germany) Jenny Nowak
- September 9 & 10, 2017: ANCK #3 in (Switzerland) Kandersteg
  - Men's winners: (Austria) Florian Dagn (#1) / (France) Lilian Vaxelaire (#2)
- September 23, 2017: ANCK #4 in (Italy) Predazzo
  - Women's winner: (Italy) Lena Prinoth
- September 23 & 24, 2017: ANCK #5 in (Germany) Winterberg
  - Men's winners: (Germany) Justin Moczarski (2 times)

Winter

- December 16 & 17, 2017: ANCK #6 in (Austria) Seefeld in Tirol
  - Men's winners: (Czech Republic) Ondřej Pažout (#1) / (France) Edgar Vallet (#2)
  - Women's winners: (Germany) Jenny Nowak (2 times)
- January 13 & 14: ANCK #7 in (Germany) Schonach
  - Men's winners: (Austria) Mika Vermeulen (2 times)
  - Women's winners: (Germany) Jenny Nowak (2 times)
- February 17 & 18: ANCK #8 in (Germany) Baiersbronn
  - Men's winners: (Austria) Johannes Lamparter (#1) / (Austria) Florian Dagn (#2)
  - Women's winners: (Italy) Annika Sieff (#1) / (Germany) Jenny Nowak (#2)
- February 24 & 25: ANCK #9 in (Slovenia) Planica
  - Men's winners: (Italy) Iacopo Bortolas (#1) / (Austria) Johannes Lamparter (#2)
  - Women's winners: (Germany) Marie Naehring (#1) / (Germany) Jenny Nowak (#2)
  - Teams winners: Austria (Stefan Rettenegger, Fabian Hafner, Manuel Einkemmer, Johannes Lamparter) (m) / Germany (Sophia Maurus, Marie Naehring, Jenny Nowak)
- March 10 & 11: ANCK #10 in (France) Chaux-Neuve
  - Men's winners: (Austria) Johannes Lamparter (2 times)
  - Women's winners: (Italy) Annika Sieff (2 times)

== Ski jumping ==
=== 2018 Winter Olympics (SJ) ===
- February 10 – 19: Ski jumping at the 2018 Winter Olympics
  - Men's Individual Normal Hill winners: (gold) (Germany) Andreas Wellinger; (silver) (Norway) Johann André Forfang; (bronze) (Norway) Robert Johansson
  - Men's Individual Large Hill winners: (gold) (Poland) Kamil Stoch; (silver) (Germany) Andreas Wellinger; (bronze) (Norway) Robert Johansson
  - Men's Team Large Hill winners: (gold) Norway; (silver) Germany; (bronze) Poland
  - Women's Individual Normal Hill winners: (gold) (Norway) Maren Lundby; (silver) (Germany) Katharina Althaus; (bronze) (Japan) Sara Takanashi

=== World ski jumping championships ===
- January 19 – 21: FIS Ski Flying World Championships 2018 in (Germany) Oberstdorf
  - Men's individual winner: (Norway) Daniel-André Tande
  - Men's team winners: Norway (Robert Johansson, Andreas Stjernen, Johann André Forfang, & Daniel-André Tande)
- February 1 – 4: 2018 FIS Junior World Ski Championships (SJ) in (Switzerland) Kandersteg-Goms, Valais
  - Individual winners: (Norway) Marius Lindvik (m) / (Slovenia) Nika Kriznar (f)
  - Men's team winners: Germany (Philipp Raimund, Justin Lisso, Cedrik Weigel, & Constantin Schmid)
  - Women's team winners: Slovenia (Jerneja Brecl, Nika Kriznar, Katra Komar, & Ema Klinec)
  - Mixed team winners: Norway (Silje Opseth, Fredrik Villumstad, Anna Odine Strøm, & Marius Lindvik)

=== 2017–18 Four Hills Tournament ===
- December 29 & 30, 2017: FHT #1 in (Germany) Oberstdorf
  - Winner: (Poland) Kamil Stoch
- December 31, 2017 & January 1, 2018: FHT #2 in (Germany) Garmisch-Partenkirchen
  - Winner: (Poland) Kamil Stoch
- January 3 & 4: FHT #3 in (Austria) Innsbruck
  - Winner: (Poland) Kamil Stoch
- January 5 & 6: FHT #4 (final) in (Austria) Bischofshofen
  - Winner: (Poland) Kamil Stoch

=== Raw Air 2018 ===
- March 9 – 11: RA #1 in Oslo (SJWC #18)
  - Individual winners: (Norway) Daniel-André Tande (m) / (Norway) Maren Lundby (f)
  - Men's team winners: Norway (Daniel-André Tande, Andreas Stjernen, Johann André Forfang, & Robert Johansson)
- March 12 & 13: RA #2 in (Norway) Lillehammer (SJWC #19)
  - Men's individual winner: (Poland) Kamil Stoch
- March 14 & 15: RA #3 in (Norway) Trondheim (SJWC #20)
  - Men's individual winner: (Poland) Kamil Stoch
- March 16 – 18: RA #4 (final) in Vikersund (SJWC #21)
  - Men's individual winner: (Norway) Robert Johansson
  - Men's team winners: Norway (Daniel-André Tande, Johann André Forfang, Andreas Stjernen, & Robert Johansson)

=== 2017–18 FIS Ski Jumping World Cup ===
- November 17 – 19, 2017: SJWC #1 in (Poland) Wisła
  - Men's individual winner: (Japan) Junshirō Kobayashi
  - Men's team winners: Norway (Johann André Forfang, Anders Fannemel, Daniel-André Tande, & Robert Johansson)
- November 24 – 26, 2017: SJWC #2 in (Finland) Ruka (Kuusamo)
  - Men's individual winner: (Slovenia) Jernej Damjan
  - Men's team winners: Norway (Robert Johansson, Anders Fannemel, Daniel-André Tande, & Johann André Forfang)
- November 30 – December 3, 2017: SJWC #3 in (Norway) Lillehammer
  - Women's individual winners: (Norway) Maren Lundby (#1) / (Germany) Katharina Althaus (#2; 2 times)
- December 1 – 3, 2017: SJWC #4 in (Russia) Nizhny Tagil
  - Men's individual winners: (Germany) Richard Freitag (#1) / (Germany) Andreas Wellinger (#2)
- December 9 & 10, 2017: SJWC #5 in (Germany) Titisee-Neustadt
  - Men's individual winner: (Germany) Richard Freitag
  - Men's team winners: Norway (Robert Johansson, Daniel-André Tande, Anders Fannemel, & Johann André Forfang)
- December 15 – 17, 2017: SJWC #6 in (Switzerland) Engelberg
  - Men's individual winners: (Norway) Anders Fannemel (#1) / (Germany) Richard Freitag (#2)
- December 15 – 17, 2017: SJWC #7 in (Germany) Hinterzarten
  - Women's individual winner: (Norway) Maren Lundby
  - Women's team winners: Japan (Yuki Ito, Kaori Iwabuchi, Yūka Setō, & Sara Takanashi)
- January 5 – 7: SJWC #8 in (Romania) Râșnov
  - Event cancelled (moved to March 2 – 4).
- January 12 – 14: SJWC #9 in (Japan) Sapporo
  - Women's individual winner: (Norway) Maren Lundby (2 times)
- January 12 – 14: SJWC #10 in (Austria) Tauplitz-Bad Mitterndorf
  - Note: The second men's individual event was cancelled.
  - Men's individual winner: (Norway) Andreas Stjernen
- January 18 – 21: SJWC #11 in Zaō, Miyagi
  - Women's individual winner: (Norway) Maren Lundby (2 times)
  - Women's team winners: Japan (Kaori Iwabuchi, Yūka Setō, Yuki Ito, & Sara Takanashi)
- January 26 – 28: SJWC #12 in (Slovenia) Ljubno ob Savinji
  - Women's individual winners: (Norway) Maren Lundby (#1) / (Austria) Daniela Iraschko-Stolz (#2)
- January 26 – 28: SJWC #13 in Zakopane
  - Men's individual winner: (Slovenia) Anže Semenič
  - Men's team winners: Poland (Maciej Kot, Stefan Hula Jr., Dawid Kubacki, & Kamil Stoch)
- February 2 – 4: SJWC #14 in (Austria) Hinzenbach
  - Event cancelled.
- February 2 – 4: SJWC #15 in (Germany) Willingen
  - Men's individual winners: (Norway) Daniel-André Tande (#1) / (Norway) Johann André Forfang (#2)
- March 2 – 4: SJWC #16 in (Finland) Lahti
  - Men's individual winner: (Poland) Kamil Stoch
  - Men's team winners: Germany (Karl Geiger, Markus Eisenbichler, Richard Freitag, & Andreas Wellinger)
- March 2 – 4: SJWC #17 in (Romania) Râșnov
  - Women's individual winners: (Germany) Katharina Althaus (#1) / (Norway) Maren Lundby (#2)
- March 22 – 25: SJWC #22 in (Slovenia) Planica
  - Men's individual winner: (Poland) Kamil Stoch (2 times)
  - Men's team winners: Norway (Daniel-André Tande, Andreas Stjernen, Robert Johansson, & Johann André Forfang)
- March 23 – 25: SJWC #23 (final) in (Germany) Oberstdorf
  - Women's individual winner: (Japan) Sara Takanashi (2 times)

=== 2017–18 FIS Ski Jumping Continental Cup ===
Summer

- July 7 & 8, 2017: #1 in (Slovenia) Kranj
  - Men's winners: (Poland) Klemens Murańka (2 times)
- August 18, 2017: #2 in (Poland) Szczyrk
  - Men's winner: (Poland) Aleksander Zniszczoł
- August 18 & 19, 2017: #3 in (Germany) Oberwiesenthal
  - Women's winners: (Germany) Ramona Straub (#1) / (Poland) Kamila Karpiel (#2)
- August 18 & 19: #4 (Czech Republic) Frenštát pod Radhoštěm
  - Women's winners: (Japan) Yuki Ito (#1) / (Japan) Sara Takanashi (#2)
- August 19, 2017: #5 in (Poland) Wisła
  - Men's winner: (Slovenia) Miran Zupančič
- August 20, 2017: #6 in (Czech Republic) Frenštát pod Radhoštěm (Men's only)
  - Men's winner: (Austria) Maximilian Steiner
- September 9 & 10, 2017: #7 in (Austria) Stams
  - Men's winners: (Austria) Stefan Kraft (#1) / (Austria) Daniel Huber (#2)
- September 16 & 17, 2017: #8 in (Norway) Trondheim
  - Men's winners: (Germany) Pius Paschke (#1) / (Slovenia) Timi Zajc (#2)
  - Women's winners: (Germany) Juliane Seyfarth (2 times)
- September 23 & 24, 2017: #9 in (Romania) Râșnov
  - Men's winners: (Germany) Pius Paschke (2 times)
- September 30 & October 1, 2017: #10 in (Germany) Klingenthal
  - Men's winners: (Norway) Joachim Hauer (#1) / (Slovenia) Tilen Bartol (#2)

Winter

- December 9 & 10, 2017: CC#11 in (Canada) Whistler
  - Men's winners: (Poland) Tomasz Pilch (#1) / (Germany) Andreas Wank (#2)
- December 15 & 16, 2017: CC #12 in (Norway) Notodden
  - Women's winners: (Russia) Lidiia Iakovleva (#1) / (Russia) Aleksandra Barantceva (#2)
- December 16 & 17, 2017: CC #13 in (Finland) Rukatunturi
  - Men's winners: (Poland) Tomasz Pilch (#1) / (Slovenia) Jurij Tepeš (#2)
- December 27 & 28, 2017: CC #14 in (Switzerland) Engelberg
  - Men's winners: (France) Jonathan Learoyd (#1) / (Austria) Ulrich Wohlgenannt (#2)
- January 6 & 7: CC #15 in (Germany) Titisee-Neustadt
  - Men's winners: (Norway) Marius Lindvik (#1) / (Germany) David Siegel (#2)
- January 10 & 11: CC #16 in (Austria) Bischofshofen
  - Men's winners: (Norway) Tom Hilde (#1) / (Germany) David Siegel (#2)
- January 20: CC #17 in (Turkey) Erzurum
  - Men's winners: (Germany) David Siegel (#1) / (Slovenia) Anže Lanišek (#2)
- January 20 & 21: CC #18 in (Slovenia) Planica #1
  - Women's winners: (Austria) Daniela Iraschko-Stolz (2 times)
- January 26 & 29: CC #19 in (Japan) Sapporo
  - Men's winners: (Slovenia) Robert Kranjec (2 times) / (Austria) Daniel Huber (#2)
- February 3 & 4: CC #19 in (Slovenia) Planica #2
  - Men's winners: (Slovenia) Anže Lanišek (2 times)
- February 10 & 11: CC #20 in (United States) Iron Mountain, Michigan
  - Men's winners: (Norway) Marius Lindvik (#1) / (Norway) Halvor Egner Granerud (#2)

=== 2017 FIS Ski Jumping Grand Prix ===
- July 13 – 15: #1 in Wisła
  - Men's winner: (Poland) Dawid Kubacki
  - Teams winners: Poland (Piotr Żyła, Kamil Stoch, Dawid Kubacki, Maciej Kot)
- July 28 & 29: #2 in (Germany) Hinterzarten
  - Men's winner: (Poland) Dawid Kubacki
- August 10 – 12: #3 in (France) Courchevel
  - Winners: (Poland) Dawid Kubacki (m) / (Germany) Katharina Althaus (f)
- August 25 – 27: #4 in (Japan) Hakuba
  - Men's winners: (Japan) Junshirō Kobayashi (2 times)
- September 8 – 10: #5 in (Russia) Chaykovsky
  - Men's winners: (Slovenia) Anže Lanišek (2 times)
  - Women's winners: (Japan) Sara Takanashi (2 times)
- September 30 – October 1: #6 in (Austria) Hinzenbach
  - Men's winners: (Poland) Dawid Kubacki
- October 2 & 3: #7 in (Germany) Klingenthal
  - Men's winners: (Poland) Dawid Kubacki

=== 2017–18 FIS Ski Jumping Alpen Cup ===
Summer

- August 6 & 7, 2017: OPA #1 in (Germany) Klingenthal
  - Women's winners: (Austria) Julia Mühlbacher (#1) / (Germany) Alexandra Seifert (#2)
- August 9 & 10, 2017: OPA #2 in (Germany) Pöhla
  - Women's winners: (Austria) Lisa Eder (2 times)
- August 11 & 12, 2017: OPA #3 in (Germany) Bischofsgrün (Women's only)
  - Women's winners: (Slovenia) Katra Komar (#1) / (Austria) Lisa Eder (#2)
- September 9 & 10, 2017: OPA #4 in (Switzerland) Kandersteg
  - Men's winners: (Slovenia) Aljaž Osterc (#1) / (Switzerland) Sandro Hauswirth (#2)
- September 23 & 24, 2017: OPA #5 in (Italy) Predazzo
  - Men's winners: (Germany) Justin Lisso (2 times)
  - Women's winners: (France) Océane Paillard (2 times)

Winter

- December 15 – 17, 2017: OPA #6 in (Austria) Seefeld in Tirol
  - Note: Second women's event here is cancelled.
  - Men's winners: (Austria) Clemens Leitner (#1) / (Switzerland) Sandro Hauswirth (#2)
  - Women's winners: (Germany) Jenny Nowak (#1)
- January 13 & 14: OPA #7 in (Germany) Hinterzarten
  - Men's winners: (Austria) Jan Hoerl (2 times)
  - Women's winners: (Slovenia) Jerneja Brecl (2 times)

=== 2017–18 FIS Cup ===
Summer

- July 1 & 2, 2017: FC #1 in (Austria) Villach
  - Men's winners: (Slovenia) Timi Zajc (#1) / (Germany) Lukas Wagner (#2)
  - Women's winners: (Slovenia) Nika Križnar (2 times)
- August 12 & 13, 2017: FC #2 in (Finland) Kuopio
  - Men's winners: (Slovenia) Timi Zajc (2 times)
- September 16 & 17, 2017: FC #3 in (Switzerland) Kandersteg
  - Men's winners: (Slovenia) Timi Zajc (#1) / (Japan) Masamitsu Itō (#2)
  - Women's winners: (France) Léa Lemare (#1) / (Slovenia) Nika Križnar (#2)
- September 21 & 22, 2017: FC #4 in (Romania) Râșnov
  - Men's winners: (Austria) Markus Rupitsch (#1) / (Germany) Dominik Mayländer (#2)
  - Women's winners: (Romania) Daniela Haralambie (2 times)

Winter

- December 7 & 8, 2017: FC #5 in (Canada) Whistler
  - Men's winners: (Austria) Elias Tollinger (#1) / (Slovenia) Nejc Dežman (#2)
  - Women's winners: (Canada) Abigail Strate (2 times)
- December 15 & 16, 2017: FC #6 in (Norway) Notodden
  - Men's winners: (Norway) Sondre Ringen (#1) / (Austria) Ulrich Wohlgenannt (#2)
- January 13 & 14: FC #7 in (Poland) Zakopane
  - Men's winners: (Austria) Maximilian Steiner (#1) / (Austria) Stefan Huber (#2)
- January 20 & 21: FC #8 in (Slovenia) Planica
  - Men's winners: (Austria) Markus Schiffner (#1) / (Germany) Dominik Mayländer (#2)
- February 10 & 11: FC #9 in (Germany) Breitenberg/Rastbüchl
  - Men's winners: (Poland) Tomasz Pilch (2 times)
  - Women's winners: (Germany) Agnes Reisch (2 times)

== Snowboarding ==
=== 2018 Winter Olympics and Paralympics (SB) ===
- February 10 – 24: Snowboarding at the 2018 Winter Olympics
  - Men's Parallel Giant Slalom winners: (gold) (Switzerland) Nevin Galmarini; (silver) (South Korea) Lee Sang-ho; (bronze) (Slovenia) Žan Košir
  - Women's Parallel Giant Slalom winners: (gold) (Czech Republic) Ester Ledecká; (silver) (Germany) Selina Jörg; (bronze) (Germany) Ramona Theresia Hofmeister
  - Men's Halfpipe winners: (gold) (United States) Shaun White; (silver) (Japan) Ayumu Hirano; (bronze) (Australia) Scott James
  - Women's Halfpipe winners: (gold) (United States) Chloe Kim; (silver) (China) Liu Jiayu; (bronze) (United States) Arielle Gold
  - Men's Big Air winners: (gold) (Canada) Sébastien Toutant; (silver) (United States) Kyle Mack; (bronze) (United Kingdom) Billy Morgan
  - Women's Big Air winners: (gold) (Austria) Anna Gasser; (silver) (United States) Jamie Anderson; (bronze) (New Zealand) Zoi Sadowski-Synnott
  - Men's Slopestyle winners: (gold) (United States) Redmond Gerard; (silver) (Canada) Maxence Parrot; (bronze) (Canada) Mark McMorris
  - Women's Slopestyle winners: (gold) (United States) Jamie Anderson; (silver) (Canada) Laurie Blouin; (bronze) (Finland) Enni Rukajärvi
  - Men's Snowboard Cross winners: (gold) (France) Pierre Vaultier; (silver) (Australia) Jarryd Hughes; (bronze) (Spain) Regino Hernández
  - Women's Snowboard Cross winners: (gold) (Italy) Michela Moioli; (silver) (France) Julia Pereira de Sousa Mabileau; (bronze) (Czech Republic) Eva Samková
- March 12 & 16: Snowboarding at the 2018 Winter Paralympics
  - Men's Banked Slalom winners:
    - SB-UL: (gold) (United States) Mike Minor; (silver) (Austria) Patrick Mayrhofer; (bronze) (Australia) Simon Patmore
    - SB-LL1: (gold) (United States) Noah Elliott; (silver) (United States) Mike Schultz; (bronze) (Croatia) Bruno Bošnjak
    - SB-LL2: (gold) (Japan) Gurimu Narita; (silver) (United States) Evan Strong; (bronze) (Finland) Matti Suur-Hamari
  - Men's Snowboard Cross winners:
    - SB-UL: (gold) (Australia) Simon Patmore; (silver) (Italy) Manuel Pozzerle; (bronze) (United States) Mike Minor
    - SB-LL1: (gold) (United States) Mike Schultz; (silver) (Netherlands) Chris Vos; (bronze) (United States) Noah Elliott
    - SB-LL2: (gold) (Finland) Matti Suur-Hamari; (silver) (United States) Keith Gabel; (bronze) (Japan) Gurimu Narita
  - Women's Banked Slalom winners:
    - SB-LL1: (gold) (United States) Brenna Huckaby; (silver) (France) Cécile Hernandez; (bronze) (United States) Amy Purdy
    - SB-LL2: (gold) (Netherlands) Bibian Mentel; (silver) (United States) Brittani Coury; (bronze) (Netherlands) Lisa Bunschoten
  - Women's Snowboard Cross winners:
    - SB-LL1: (gold) (United States) Brenna Huckaby; (silver) (United States) Amy Purdy; (bronze) (France) Cécile Hernandez
    - SB-LL2: (gold) (Netherlands) Bibian Mentel; (silver) (Netherlands) Lisa Bunschoten; (bronze) (Spain) Astrid Fina

=== International events ===
- March 2: Asian Cup (Snowboard) in (South Korea) Pyeongchang
  - Halfpipe winners: (South Korea) Lee Kwang-ki (m) / (South Korea) Sunoo Kwon (f)

=== Alpine snowboarding ===
- December 14, 2017: ASWC #1 in (Italy) Carezza
  - Parallel Giant Slalom winners: (Russia) Andrey Sobolev (m) / (Czech Republic) Ester Ledecká (f)
- December 15 & 16, 2017: ASWC #2 in (Italy) Cortina d'Ampezzo
  - Parallel Giant Slalom winners: (Austria) Alexander Payer (m) / (Czech Republic) Ester Ledecká (f)
  - Parallel Slalom winners: (Italy) Roland Fischnaller (m) / (Austria) Sabine Schöffmann (f)
- January 5: ASWC #3 in (Austria) Lackenhof
  - Parallel Giant Slalom winners: (Switzerland) Nevin Galmarini (m) / (Czech Republic) Ester Ledecká (f)
- January 12: ASWC #4 in (Austria) Bad Gastein
  - Parallel Slalom winners: (Russia) Dmitry Loginov (m) / (Germany) Ramona Theresia Hofmeister (f)
- January 20 & 21: ASWC #5 in (Slovenia) Rogla Ski Resort
  - Men's Parallel Giant Slalom winners: (Austria) Andreas Prommegger (#1) / (Austria) Benjamin Karl (#2)
  - Women's Parallel Giant Slalom winners: (Czech Republic) Ester Ledecká (#1) / (Germany) Ramona Theresia Hofmeister (#2)
- January 26 & 28: ASWC #6 in (Bulgaria) Bansko
  - Men's Parallel Giant Slalom winners: (Canada) Jasey-Jay Anderson (#1) / (Switzerland) Nevin Galmarini (#2)
  - Women's Parallel Giant Slalom winners: (Czech Republic) Ester Ledecká (#1) / (Austria) Julia Dujmovits (#2)
- March 3: ASWC #7 in (Turkey) Kayseri
  - Parallel Giant Slalom winners: (Germany) Stefan Baumeister (m) / (Russia) Milena Bykova (f)
- March 10: ASWC #8 in (Switzerland) Scuol
  - Parallel Giant Slalom winners: (Slovenia) Tim Mastnak (m) / (Czech Republic) Ester Ledecká (f)
- March 17: ASWC #9 (final) in (Germany) Winterberg
  - Parallel Slalom winners: (Italy) Roland Fischnaller (m) / (Germany) Selina Jörg (f)

=== Snowboard cross ===
- September 8 – 10, 2017: SBXWC #1 in (Argentina) Cerro Catedral
  - Men's Snowboard cross winner: (Australia) Alex Pullin (2 times)
  - Women's Snowboard cross winners: (France) Chloé Trespeuch (#1) / (United States) Lindsey Jacobellis (#2)
- December 12 & 13, 2017: SBXWC #2 in (France) Val Thorens
  - Snowboard cross winners: (Germany) Paul Berg (m) / (United States) Lindsey Jacobellis (f)
- December 15 – 17, 2017: SBXWC #3 in (Austria) Montafon
  - Men's Snowboard cross winner: (Australia) Jarryd Hughes
  - Women's Snowboard cross winner: (Italy) Michela Moioli
  - Team winners: Spain (Regino Hernández & Lucas Eguibar) (m) / France (Chloé Trespeuch & Nelly Moenne Loccoz) (f)
- December 21 & 22, 2017: SBXWC #4 in (Italy) Breuil-Cervinia
  - Snowboard cross winners: (Italy) Omar Visintin (m) / (Italy) Michela Moioli (f)
- January 20 & 21: SBXWC #5 in (Turkey) Erzurum
  - Snowboard cross winners: (Italy) Omar Visintin (m) / (Czech Republic) Eva Samková (f)
  - Team winners: Italy (Emanuel Perathoner & Omar Visintin) (m) / France (Nelly Moenne Loccoz & Chloé Trespeuch) (f)
- January 27: SBXWC #6 in (Bulgaria) Bansko
  - Snowboard cross winners: (France) Pierre Vaultier (m) / (France) Charlotte Bankes (f)
- February 2 – 4: SBXWC #7 in (Germany) Feldberg
  - Men's Snowboard cross winners: (Austria) Julian Lueftner (#1) / (France) Pierre Vaultier (#2)
  - Women's Snowboard cross winner: (Italy) Michela Moioli (2 times)
- March 2 & 3: SBXWC #8 in (Spain) La Molina
  - Snowboard Cross winners: (Austria) Alessandro Hämmerle (m) / (Czech Republic) Eva Samková (f)
- March 10 & 11: SBXWC #9 in (Russia) Moscow
  - Snowboard Cross winners: (Austria) Alessandro Hämmerle (m) / (Czech Republic) Eva Samková (f)
  - Team winners: Italy (Emanuel Perathoner & Omar Visintin) (m) / France (Nelly Moenne Loccoz & Chloé Trespeuch) (f)
- March 16 – 18: SBXWC #10 (final) in (Switzerland) Veysonnaz
  - Snowboard Cross winners: (United States) Nate Holland (m) / (Italy) Michela Moioli (f)
  - Team winners: Germany (Paul Berg & Konstantin Schad) (m) / France (Nelly Moenne Loccoz & Chloé Trespeuch) (f)

=== Freestyle snowboarding ===
- September 3 – 9, 2017: FSWC #1 in (New Zealand) Cardrona Alpine Resort
  - Slopestyle winners: (Norway) Marcus Kleveland (m) / (United States) Jamie Anderson (f)
  - Half-pipe winners: (Japan) Yuto Totsuka (m) / (United States) Chloe Kim (f)
- November 4, 2017: FSWC #2 in (Denmark) Copenhagen
  - Event cancelled.
- November 11, 2017: FSWC #3 in (Italy) Milan
  - Big Air winners: (United States) Chris Corning (m) / (Austria) Anna Gasser (f)
- November 24 & 25, 2017: FSWC #4 in (China) Beijing
  - Big Air winners: (Canada) Mark McMorris (m) / (Austria) Anna Gasser (f)
- December 2, 2017: FSWC #5 in (Germany) Mönchengladbach
  - Big Air winners: (Norway) Marcus Kleveland (m) / (Switzerland) Carla Somaini (f)
- December 7 – 10, 2017: FSWC #6 in (United States) Copper Mountain
  - Big Air winners: (Norway) Mons Røisland (m) / (Japan) Reira Iwabuchi (f)
  - Half-pipe winners: (Japan) Ayumu Hirano (m) / (United States) Chloe Kim (f)
- December 19 & 21, 2017: FSWC #7 in (China) Genting Resort Secret Garden
  - Half-pipe winners: (Japan) Ayumu Hirano (m) / (China) Liu Jiayu (f)
- January 10 – 13: FSWC #8 in (United States) Snowmass
  - Slopestyle winners: (United States) Redmond Gerard (m) / (New Zealand) Christy Prior (f)
  - Half-pipe winners: (United States) Shaun White (m) / (Spain) Queralt Castellet (f)
- January 17 – 20: FSWC #9 in (Switzerland) Laax
  - Note: The slopestyle events here were cancelled.
  - Half-pipe winners: (Switzerland) Iouri Podladtchikov (m) / (China) Liu Jiayu (f)
- March 15 – 17: FSWC #10 in (Italy) Seiser Alm
  - Slopestyle winners: (United States) Chris Corning (m) / (Russia) Sofya Fyodorova (f)
- March 23 & 24: FSWC #11 (final) in (Canada) Stoneham Mountain Resort
  - Big Air winners: (Canada) Maxence Parrot (m) / (United States) Julia Marino (f)

=== 2017–18 European Cup (SB) ===
- November 22 – 23, 2017: SBEC #1 in (Netherlands) Landgraaf
  - Men's Slopestyle winners: (Netherlands) Erik Bastiaansen (two times)
  - Women's Slopestyle winners: (Belgium) Evy Poppe (#1) / (Germany) Annika Morgan (#2)
- November 25 & 26, 2017: SBEC #2 in (Austria) Kaunertal
  - Event cancelled.
- November 29 & 30, 2017: SBEC #3 in (Austria) Sankt Leonhard im Pitztal
  - Men's Snowboard Cross winners: (Austria) Julian Lüftner (#1) / (United States) Nick Baumgartner (#2)
  - Women's Snowboard Cross winners: (United States) Rosina Mancari (#1) / (United States) Faye Gulini (#2)
- December 9 & 10, 2017: SBEC #4 in (Germany) Hochfügen
  - Men's Parallel Giant Slalom winners: (Germany) Patrick Bussler (#1) / (Poland) Michał Nowaczyk (#2)
  - Women's Parallel Giant Slalom winners: (Germany) Selina Jörg (#1) / (Austria) Sabine Schöffmann (#2)
- January 13 & 14: SBEC #5 in (Slovakia) Jasna
  - Men's Slopestyle winners: (Switzerland) Gian Andrea Sutter (#1) / (Germany) Noah Vicktor (#2)
  - Women's Slopestyle winners: (Germany) Annika Morgan (2 times)
- January 13 & 14: SBEC #6 in (France) Isola 2000
  - Men's Snowboard Cross winners: (France) Ken Vuagnoux (#1) / (Austria) Jakob Dusek (#2)
  - Women's Snowboard Cross winners: (France) Holly Roberts (#1) / (Switzerland) Muriel Jost (#2)
- January 19 & 21: SBEC #7 in (France) Font Romeu
  - Big Air winners: (Germany) Leon Vockensperger (m) / (Croatia) Lea Jugovac (f)
  - Slopestyle winners: (Germany) Leon Vockensperger (m) / (Croatia) Lea Jugovac (f)
- January 20 & 21: SBEC #8 in (Austria) Lachtal
  - Men's Parallel Giant Slalom winners: (Italy) Daniele Bagozza (2 times)
  - Women's Parallel Giant Slalom winners: (Austria) Jemima Juritz (#1) / (Russia) Alexandra Vlasenko (#2)
- January 23 & 24: SBEC #9 in (France) Vars
  - Slopestyle winners: (Switzerland) Gian Andrea Sutter (m) / (Switzerland) Ariane Burri (f)
  - Big Air winners: (Germany) Leon Vockensperger (m) / (Poland) Katarzyna Rusin (f)
- January 27 & 28: SBEC #10 in (Switzerland) Crans-Montana
  - Halfpipe winners: (Switzerland) Elias Allenspach (m) / (Slovenia) Kaja Verdnik (f)
  - Big Air winners: (France) Enzo Valax (m) / (Switzerland) Lia-Mara Bösch (f)
- January 27 & 28: SBEC #11 in (Germany) Grasgehren
  - Men's Snowboard Cross winners: (Germany) Florian Gregor (#1) / (Austria) Jakob Dusek (#2)
  - Women's Snowboard Cross winners: (France) Alexia Queyrel (#1) / (Italy) Sofia Belingheri (#2)
- January 3 & 4: SBEC #12 in (France) Puy-Saint-Vincent
  - Men's Snowboard Cross winners: (Austria) Jakob Dusek (#1) / (Austria) Luca Hämmerle (#2)
  - Women's Snowboard Cross winners: (Switzerland) Muriel Jost (2 times)
- February 10 & 11: SBEC #13 in (Bulgaria) Pamporovo
  - This event was cancelled.
- February 10 & 11: SBEC #14 in (Switzerland) Lenzerheide
  - Men's Parallel Slalom winners: (Italy) Maurizio Bormolini (#1) / (Italy) Daniele Bagozza (#2)
  - Women's Parallel Slalom winners: (Switzerland) Larissa Gasser (#1) / (Austria) Jemima Juritz (#2)
- February 18: SBEC #15 in (Bosnia and Herzegovina) Sarajevo
  - Big Air winners: (France) Enzo Valax (m) / (France) Thalie Larochaix (f)
- February 23 & 24: SBEC #16 in (Switzerland) Davos
  - Halfpipe winners: (Switzerland) Viktor Ivanov (m) / (Switzerland) Verena Rohrer (f)
- February 25 & 26: SBEC #17 in (Serbia) Kopaonik
  - Men's Big Air winners: (France) Enzo Valax (#1)
  - Women's Big Air winners: (Croatia) Lea Jugovac (#1)
  - Note: Second events of Big Air here is cancelled.
- March 1 – 3: SBEC #18 in (Germany) Götschen
  - Big Air winners: (Germany) Leon Vockensperger (m) / (Belgium) Loranne Smans (f)
- March 10: SBEC #19 in (Czech Republic) Pec pod Sněžkou
  - Slopestyle winners: (Italy) Nicola Liviero (m) / (Poland) Katarzyna Rusin (f)
- March 9 – 11: SBEC #20 in (Switzerland) Lenk
  - Men's Snowboard Cross winners: (Australia) Matthew Thomas (2 times)
  - Women's Snowboard Cross winners: (Germany) Hanna Ihedioha (#1) / (France) Alexia Queyrel (#2)
- March 10 & 11: SBEC #21 in (Austria) Tauplitz
  - Men's Parallel Slalom winners: (Austria) Johann Stefaner (2 times)
  - Women's Parallel Slalom winners: (Russia) Maria Valova (#1) / (Austria) Jemima Juritz (#2)

=== 2017–18 North American Cup (SB) ===
- December 9 & 10, 2017: NAC #1 in (United States) Steamboat Ski Resort
  - Parallel Giant Slalom winners: (United States) Steven MacCutcheon (m) / (Australia) Millie Bongiorno
  - Parallel Slalom winners: (Portugal) Christian De Oliveira (m) / (Canada) Jennifer Hawkrigg (f)
- December 11 – 16, 2017:: NAC #2 in (United States) Copper Mountain
  - Men's Halfpipe winners: (Japan) Raibu Katayama (#1) / (Japan) Yūto Totsuka (#2)
  - Women's Halfpipe winners: (Australia) Torah Bright (#1) / (Japan) Kurumi Imai (#2)
- December 15 – 17, 2017:: NAC #3 in (United States) Buck Hill
  - Men's Parallel Slalom winners: (United States) William Taylor (#1) / (Canada) Richard-Riley Kilmer-Choi (#2) / (United States) Dylan Udolf (#3)
  - Women's Parallel Slalom winners: (Canada) Jennifer Hawkrigg (2 times) / (United States) Karina Bladon (#3)
- January 3 – 5: NAC #4 in (Canada) Le Relais
  - Men's Parallel Giant Slalom winners: (Canada) Michael Nazwaski (#1) / (Canada) Arnaud Gaudet (#2)
  - Women's Parallel Giant Slalom winners: (Australia) Millie Bongiorno (#1) / (Canada) Jennifer Hawkrigg (#2)
- January 23 & 24: NAC #5 in (Canada) Sun Peaks Resort
  - Men's Slopestyle winners: (Canada) Liam Gill (#1) / (Canada) Liam Brearley (#2)
  - Women's Slopestyle winners: (Canada) Jasmine Baird (#1) / (Canada) Sommer Gendron (#2)
- January 26 – 28: NAC #6 in (Canada) Big White Ski Resort
  - Men's Snowboard Cross winners: (Canada) Danny Bourgeois (2 times)
  - Women's Snowboard Cross winners: (Canada) Emilie-Kate Robinson-Leith (2 times)
- January 31 – February 2: NAC #7 in (United States) Holiday Valley
  - Men's Parallel Giant Slalom winners: (Canada) Arnaud Gaudet (#1) / (Canada) Jules Lefebvre (#2)
  - Women's Parallel Giant Slalom winners: (Canada) Megan Farrell (2 times)
- February 4 – 9: NAC #8 in (Canada) Blue Mountain Resort
  - Parallel Giant Slalom winners: (Canada) Darren Gardner (m) / (Canada) Megan Farrell (f)
  - Parallel Slalom winners: (Canada) Sebastien Beaulieu (m) / (Canada) Megan Farrell (f)
- February 7 – 9: NAC #9 in (Canada) Craigleith
  - Men's Snowboard Cross winners: (United States) Senna Leith (2 times)
  - Women's Snowboard Cross winners: (Australia) Elise Turner (#1) / (United States) Stacy Gaskill (#2)
- February 8 – 10: NAC #10 in (Canada) Mount St-Louis Moonstone
  - Slopestyle winners: (Canada) Nicolas Laframboise (m) / (Canada) Jasmine Baird (f)
  - Halfpipe winners: (Canada) Jack Collins (m) / (United States) Taylor Obregon (f)
- February 12 – 15: NAC #11 in (United States) Sunday River
  - Men's Snowboard Cross winners: (Canada) Danny Bourgeois (2 times)
  - Women's Snowboard Cross winners: (Australia) Emily Boyce (#1) / (United States) Anna Miller (#2)
- February 20 – 22: NAC #12 in (Canada) Toronto
  - Men's Parallel Slalom winners: (United States) Robert Burns (2 times)
  - Women's Parallel Slalom winners: (Canada) Megan Farrell (2 times)
- February 21 – 23: NAC #13 in (Canada) Mont Original
  - Men's Snowboard Cross winners: (Canada) Liam Moffatt (#1) / (Canada) Danny Bourgeois (#2)
  - Women's Snowboard Cross winners: (United States) Danielle Steinhoff (#1) / (Australia) Emily Boyce (#2)
- February 27 & 28: NAC #14 in (United States) Park City
  - Halfpipe winners: (United States) Chase Blackwell (m) / (United States) Anna Valentine (f)
  - Slopestyle winners: (United States) Lyon Farrell (m) / (United States) Courtney Rummel (f)
- March 5 – 8: NAC #15 in (United States) Sugarloaf
  - Men's Snowboard Cross winners: (Australia) Henry Collins (#1) / (Canada) Danny Bourgeois (#2)
  - Women's Snowboard Cross winners: (United States) Stacy Gaskill (#1) / (United States) Anna Miller (#2)
- March 5 – 11: NAC #16 in Canada Olympic Park, AB
  - Halfpipe winners: (Canada) Shawn Fair (m) / (Canada) Calynn Irwin (f)
  - Slopestyle winners: (Canada) William Buffey (m) / (Canada) Jasmine Baird (f)

=== 2017 South American Cup (SB) ===
- August 11 & 12: SAC #1 in (Chile) La Parva #1
  - Slopestyle #1 winners: (Argentina) Federico Chiaradio (m) / (Chile) Antonia Yáñez (f)
  - Slopestyle #2 winners: (Argentina) Matias Schmitt (m) / (Chile) Antonia Yáñez (f)
- August 25 & 26: SAC #2 in (Chile) La Parva #2
  - Snowboardcross #1 winners: (Canada) Kevin Hill (m) / (Canada) Meryeta Odine (f)
  - Snowboardcross #2 here is cancelled
- September 4 & 5: SAC #3 in (Chile) Corralco (part of XXIII Brazilian Snowboard Championships)
  - Snowboardcross #1 winners: (Austria) Markus Schairer (m) / (Brazil) Isabel Clark Ribeiro (f)
  - Snowboardcross #2 here is cancelled
- September 12 & 13: SAC #4 in (Argentina) Cerro Catedral
  - Snowboardcross #1 winners: (Canada) Danny Bourgeois (m) / (Switzerland) Simona Meiler (f)
  - Snowboardcross #2 winners: (Canada) Danny Bourgeois (m) / (United States) Anna Miller (f)
- September 17 & 18: SAC #5 in (Argentina) Cerro Catedral
  - Big Air #1 winners: (Argentina) Martín Jaureguialzo (m) / (Argentina) Macarena Valle (f)
  - Big Air #2 winners: (Argentina) Martín Jaureguialzo (m) / (Mexico) Sandra Isabel Hillen Rodriguez (f)

=== 2017 Australia & New Zealand Cup (SB) ===
- July 26 – 28: SBANC #1 in (Australia) Mount Hotham #1
  - Snowboardcross #1 winners: (Australia) Cameron Bolton (m) / (Australia) Georgia Baff (f)
  - Snowboardcross #2 winners: (Australia) Alex Pullin (m) / (Australia) Georgia Baff (f)
- August 15 – 17: SBANC #2 in (New Zealand) Cardrona (part of FIS Continental Cup)
  - Halfpipe winners: (Japan) Naito Ando (m) / (Australia) Emily Arthur (f)
  - Slopestyle winners: (Australia) Matthew Cox (m) / (Japan) Reira Iwabuchi (f)
- August 24 – 27: SBANC #3 in (Australia) Mount Hotham #2
  - Snowboardcross #1 winners: (Australia) Alex Pullin (m) / (Australia) Emily Boyce (f)
  - Snowboardcross #2 winners: (Australia) Alex Pullin (m) / (Australia) Emily Boyce (f)

== Telemark skiing ==
=== FIS Telemark Junior World Ski Championships ===
- March 19 – 25: 2018 FIS Junior World Ski Championships (TS) in (Switzerland) Mürren-Schilthorn
  - Sprint winners: (Switzerland) Romain Beney (m) / (Norway) Kaja Bjoernstad Konow (f)
  - Classic winners: (France) Noe Claye (m) / (France) Chloe Blyth (f)
  - Parallel Sprint winners: (Germany) Louis Uber (m) / (Norway) Goril Strom Eriksen (f)
  - Mixed Team Parallel Sprint winners: Norway

=== 2017–18 FIS Telemark World Cup ===
- December 1 – 3, 2017: TSWC #1 in (Austria) Hintertux
  - Men's Sprint winners: (Switzerland) Bastien Dayer (#1) / (Switzerland) Nicolas Michel (#2)
  - Women's Sprint winners: (Switzerland) Beatrice Zimmermann (#1) / (Germany) Johanna Holzmann (#2)
  - Parallel Sprint winners: (Switzerland) Bastien Dayer (m) / (Germany) Johanna Holzmann (f)
- January 12 & 13: TSWC #2 in (France) Pralognan-la-Vanoise
  - Sprint winners: (Switzerland) Nicolas Michel (m) / (Germany) Johanna Holzmann (f)
  - Classic winners: (Switzerland) Stefan Matter (m) / (France) Argeline Tan Bouquet (f)
- January 20 – 22: TSWC #3 in (United States) Suicide Six
  - Men's Sprint winners: (Slovenia) Jure Ales (#1) / (Switzerland) Nicolas Michel (#2)
  - Women's Sprint winners: (United Kingdom) Jasmin Taylor (#1) / (Switzerland) Simone Oehrli (#2)
  - Parallel Sprint winners: (Switzerland) Nicolas Michel (m) / (Germany) Johanna Holzmann (f)
- January 24 – 26: TSWC #4 in (United States) Sugarbush Resort
  - Classic #1 winners: (Slovenia) Jure Ales (m) / (United Kingdom) Jasmin Taylor (f)
  - Classic #2 winners: (France) Philippe Lau (m) / (France) Argeline Tan Bouquet (f)
  - Sprint winners: (France) Philippe Lau (m) / (France) Argeline Tan Bouquet (f)
- February 3 & 4: TSWC #5 in (Germany) Bad Hindelang-Oberjoch
  - Sprint winners: (France) Philippe Lau (m) / (Switzerland) Beatrice Zimmermann (f)
  - Parallel Sprint winners: (Switzerland) Nicolas Michel (m) / (Germany) Johanna Holzmann (f)
- February 7 & 8: TSWC #6 in (Slovenia) Krvavec Ski Resort
  - Note: The sprint events here were cancelled.
  - Parallel Sprint winners: (Switzerland) Stefan Matter (m) / (United Kingdom) Jasmin Taylor (f)
- March 14 – 17: TSWC #7 in (Norway) Rjukan
  - Sprint #1 winners: (Norway) Trym Nygaard Loeken (m) / (Switzerland) Martina Wyss (f)
  - Sprint #2 winners: (France) Philippe Lau (m) / (France) Argeline Tan Bouquet (f)
  - Men's Parallel Sprint winners: (Norway) Trym Nygaard Loeken (#1) / (Slovenia) Jure Ales (#2)
  - Women's Parallel Sprint winner: (Germany) Johanna Holzmann (2 times)
- March 19 – 25: TSWC #8 (final) in (Switzerland) Mürren-Schilthorn (part of FIS Telemark Junior World Championships)
  - Sprint winners: (Norway) Trym Nygaard Loeken (m) / (Germany) Johanna Holzmann (f)
  - Classic winners: (Norway) Trym Nygaard Loeken (m) / (Switzerland) Beatrice Zimmermann (f)
  - Parallel Sprint winners: (France) Philippe Lau (m) / (United Kingdom) Jasmin Taylor (f)
  - Mixed Team Parallel Sprint winners: France
