= FIS Freestyle Ski and Snowboarding World Championships 2017 – Women's moguls =

2017 edition of the FIS Freestyle Ski and Snowboarding World Championships

The women's moguls competition of the FIS Freestyle Ski and Snowboarding World Championships 2017 was held at Sierra Nevada, Spain on March 8 (qualifying and finals). 34 athletes from 15 countries competed.

== Qualification ==
The following are the results of the qualification.

Rank	Bib	Name	Country	Q1	Q2	Notes
1	1	Britteny Cox	Australia	80.23		Q
2	3	Justine Dufour-Lapointe	Canada	78.37		Q
3	5	Chloé Dufour-Lapointe	Canada	76.80		Q
4	15	Hedvig Wessel	Norway	76.34		Q
5	2	Perrine Laffont	France	76.16		Q
6	4	Andi Naude	Canada	76.12		Q
7	6	Keaton McCargo	United States	75.59		Q
8	12	Marika Pertakhiya	Russia	75.52		Q
9	10	Regina Rakhimova	Russia	75.09		Q
10	18	Yulia Galysheva	Kazakhstan	71.73	76.81	Q
11	8	Audrey Robichaud	Canada	36.93	75.73	Q
12	11	Olivia Giaccio	United States	69.08	75.42	Q
13	28	Lea Bouard	Germany	74.94	73.39	Q
14	22	Jakara Anthony	Australia	40.34	74.63	Q
15	26	Seo Jung-hwa	South Korea	69.84	74.25	Q
16	21	Deborah Scanzio	Switzerland	73.38	73.85	Q
17	9	Maxime Dufour-Lapointe	Canada	70.86	73.78	Q
18	24	Laura Grasemann	Germany	73.40	69.29	Q
19	17	Morgan Schild	United States	70.19	DNF	
20	23	Madi Himbury	Australia	66.33	68.91	
21	7	Jaelin Kauf	United States	67.27	68.58	
22	30	Seo Jee-won	South Korea	42.31	63.23	
23	35	Makayla Gerken Schofield	Great Britain	55.18	61.92	
24	34	Ayaulum Amrenova	Kazakhstan	61.19	56.50	
25	31	Melanie Meilinger	Austria	52.45	60.67	
26	37	Kristine Gullachsen	Norway	48.76	58.47	
27	33	Wang Jin	China	52.74	49.82	
28	32	Guan Ziyan	China	34.88	26.42	
29	38	Tetiana Petrova	Ukraine	31.43	25.27	
30	40	Feng Yue	China	21.54		
31	36	Ma Zhuoni	China	3.10		
	27	Katharina Foerster	Germany	DNF		
	41	Marina Terron	Spain	DNF		
	36	Leonie Gerken Schofield	Great Britain	DNS		

== Final ==
The following are the results of the finals.

Rank	Bib	Name	Country	Final 1	Final 2
1st place, gold medalist(s)	1	Britteny Cox	Australia	82.82	83.63
2nd place, silver medalist(s)	2	Perrine Laffont	France	82.64	82.51
3rd place, bronze medalist(s)	3	Justine Dufour-Lapointe	Canada	82.58	80.74
4	12	Marika Pertakhiya	Russia	81.94	77.54
5	15	Hedvig Wessel	Norway	79.08	77.45
6	10	Regina Rakhimova	Russia	78.12	75.77
7	18	Yulia Galysheva	Kazakhstan	77.97	
8	21	Deborah Scanzio	Switzerland	76.67	
9	5	Chloé Dufour-Lapointe	Canada	76.37	
10	6	Keaton McCargo	United States	75.86	
11	24	Laura Grasemann	Germany	75.52	
12	22	Jakara Anthony	Australia	75.45	
13	4	Andi Naude	Canada	74.22	
14	28	Lea Bouard	Germany	74.04	
15	11	Olivia Giaccio	United States	73.43	
16	9	Maxime Dufour-Lapointe	Canada	73.06	
17	26	Seo Jung-hwa	South Korea	45.43	
	8	Audrey Robichaud	Canada	DNF	
