= FIS Freestyle Ski and Snowboarding World Championships 2017 – Women's dual moguls =

The women's moguls competition of the FIS Freestyle Ski and Snowboarding World Championships 2017 was held at Sierra Nevada, Spain on March 9 (qualifying and finals). 31 athletes from 15 countries competed.

== Bracket ==
The following are the results of the competition.

=== Finals ===
Semifinals
18	Yulia Galysheva (KAZ)	27
28	Seo Jee-won (KOR)	8
7	Jaelin Kauf (USA)	14
2	Perrine Laffont (FRA)	21

Final
18	Yulia Galysheva (KAZ)	17
2	Perrine Laffont (FRA)	18
Third place
28	Seo Jee-won (KOR)	14
7	Jaelin Kauf (USA)	21

=== Top half ===
Round of 32
37	Ayaulum Amrenova (RUS)	12
22	Jakara Anthony (AUS)	18
8	Audrey Robichaud (CAN)	DNF
27	Lea Bouard (GER)
23	Madi Himbury (AUS)	6
18	Yulia Galysheva (KAZ)	29
5	Chloe Dufour-Lapointe (CAN)	27
36	Makayla Gerken Schofield (GBR)	8
28	Seo Jee-won (KOR)	19
11	Olivia Giaccio (USA)	16
21	Deborah Scanzio (SUI)	19
24	Laura Grasemann (GER)	16
31	Wang Jin (CHN)	DNF
4	Andi Naude (CAN)

Round of 16
1	Britteny Cox (AUS)	21
22	Jakara Anthony (AUS)	14
27	Lea Bouard (GER)	17
18	Yulia Galysheva (KAZ)	18
5	Chloe Dufour-Lapointe (CAN)	16
28	Seo Jee-won (KOR)	19
21	Deborah Scanzio (SUI)	18
4	Andi Naude (CAN)	17

Quarterfinals
1	Britteny Cox (AUS)	12
18	Yulia Galysheva (KAZ)	23
28	Seo Jee-won (KOR)	21
21	Deborah Scanzio (SUI)	14

Semifinals
18	Yulia Galysheva (KAZ)	27
21	Seo Jee-won (KOR)	8

=== Bottom half ===
Round of 32
3	Justine Dufour-Lapointe (CAN)	25
32	Kristine Gullachsen (NOR)	10
29	Melanie Meilinger (AUT)	8
12	Marika Pertakhiya (RUS)	27
10	Regina Rakhimova (RUS)	35
38	Tetiana Petrova (UKR)	0
30	Guan Ziyan (CHN)	3
7	Jaelin Kauf (USA)	32
6	Keaton McCargo (USA)	33
34	Feng Yue (CHN)	2
33	Ma Zhuoni (CHN)	0
17	Morgan Schild (USA)	35
15	Hedvig Wessel (NOR)	21
26	Seo Jung-hwa (KOR)	14
35	Marina Terron (ESP)	0
2	Perrine Laffont (FRA)	35

Round of 16
3	Justine Dufour-Lapointe (CAN)	14
12	Marika Pertakhiya (RUS)	21
10	Regina Rakhimova (RUS)	14
7	Jaelin Kauf (USA)	21
6	Keaton McCargo (USA)	20
17	Morgan Schild (USA)	15
15	Hedvig Wessel (NOR)	16
2	Perrine Laffont (FRA)	19

Quarterfinals
12	Marika Pertakhiya (RUS)	15
7	Jaelin Kauf (USA)	20
6	Keaton McCargo (USA)	DNF
2	Perrine Laffont (FRA)

Semifinals
7	Jaelin Kauf (USA)	14
2	Perrine Laffont (FRA)	21
