= Freestyle skiing at the 2018 Winter Olympics – Women's moguls =

Women's moguls at the XXIII Olympic Winter Games
- Venue: Bogwang Phoenix Park, Pyeongchang, South Korea
- Dates: 9 February (qualification 1); 11 February (qualification 2 and final)
- Competitors: 30 from 14 nations
- Winning points: 78.65

Medalists
1st place, gold medalist(s)		Perrine Laffont	France
2nd place, silver medalist(s)		Justine Dufour-Lapointe	Canada
3rd place, bronze medalist(s)		Yuliya Galysheva	Kazakhstan

The Women's moguls event in freestyle skiing at the 2018 Winter Olympics took place at the Bogwang Phoenix Park, Pyeongchang, South Korea from 9 to 11 February 2018. It was won by Perrine Laffont, with Justine Dufour-Lapointe taking silver and Yuliya Galysheva taking bronze. For Laffont and Galysheva these were first Olympic medals. Galysheva also won the first ever medal in Kazakhstan in freestyle skiing.

The field included the defending champion, Justine Dufour-Lapointe, and the 2014 silver medalist and her sister, Chloé Dufour-Lapointe. Both advanced to Final 1, but only Justine advanced further to Final 2 (and eventually to Final 3). With Andi Naude, who had the highest total score in Final 2, skiing off the course, and Britteny Cox and Jakara Anthony posting total scores well below their performance in Final 2, Galysheva, Dufour-Lapointe, and Laffont consecutively came to the lead and took the podium.

In the victory ceremony, the medals were presented by Tony Estanguet, member of the International Olympic Committee accompanied by Michel Vion, FIS council member.

== Qualification ==
The top 30 athletes in the Olympic quota allocation list qualified, with a maximum of four athletes per National Olympic Committee (NOC) allowed. All athletes qualifying must also have placed in the top 30 of a FIS World Cup event or the FIS Freestyle Ski and Snowboarding World Championships 2017 during the qualification period (July 1, 2016 to January 21, 2018) and also have a minimum of 80 FIS points to compete. If the host country, South Korea at the 2018 Winter Olympics did not qualify, their chosen athlete would displace the last qualified athlete, granted all qualification criterion was met.

== Results ==
=== Qualification ===
In the first qualifying round, the ten best athletes directly qualified for the final. Others competed in the second qualification round.

==== Qualifying 1 ====
QF — Qualified directly for the final
QS — Qualified for the semifinal
Bib — Bib number
DNF — Did not finish
DNS — Did not start

Rank	Order	Name	Country	Time	Score			Total	Notes
Rank	Order	Name	Country	Time	Turns	Air	Time	Total	Notes
1	13	Perrine Laffont	France	28.87	50.5	13.75	15.47	79.72	QF
2	3	Andi Naude	Canada	29.10	49.6	14.79	15.21	79.60	QF
3	5	Morgan Schild	United States	29.76	48.8	14.48	14.48	77.74	QF
4	8	Justine Dufour-Lapointe	Canada	29.26	48.3	14.33	15.03	77.66	QF
5	18	Jaelin Kauf	United States	28.91	48.3	13.73	15.42	77.45	QF
6	2	Britteny Cox	Australia	28.94	48.4	12.99	15.39	76.78	QF
7	19	Yuliya Galysheva	Kazakhstan	30.51	47.1	15.64	13.62	76.36	QF
8	10	Keaton McCargo	United States	29.84	48.5	12.80	14.37	75.67	QF
9	9	Arisa Murata	Japan	29.90	46.0	13.83	14.30	74.13	QF
10	16	Audrey Robichaud	Canada	32.32	48.3	12.60	11.58	72.48	QF
11	20	Regina Rakhimova	Olympic Athletes from Russia	31.74	45.4	14.14	12.23	71.77	
12	1	Marika Pertakhiya	Olympic Athletes from Russia	30.37	44.6	12.05	13.78	70.43	
13	15	Chloé Dufour-Lapointe	Canada	30.01	44.0	11.35	14.18	69.53	
14	21	Jakara Anthony	Australia	30.52	43.4	12.48	13.61	69.49	
15	25	Madii Himbury	Australia	31.45	44.0	12.42	12.56	68.98	
16	30	Camille Cabrol	France	31.96	44.7	12.21	11.98	68.89	
17	28	Claudia Gueli	Australia	31.17	43.1	12.71	12.87	68.68	
18	11	Hedvig Wessel	Norway	29.70	42.0	12.11	14.53	68.64	
19	14	Seo Jee-won	South Korea	30.71	45.0	10.07	13.39	68.46	
20	17	Ekaterina Stolyarova	Olympic Athletes from Russia	30.82	42.3	12.12	13.27	67.69	
21	6	Deborah Scanzio	Switzerland	30.82	41.2	11.91	13.27	66.38	
22	29	Tess Johnson	United States	30.56	41.7	10.29	13.56	65.55	
23	26	Katharina Förster	Germany	29.71	39.4	9.25	14.52	63.17	
24	24	Léa Bouard	Germany	29.18	33.6	6.99	15.12	55.71	
25	12	Melanie Meilinger	Austria	33.78	37.0	8.02	9.93	54.95	
26	22	Ayaulum Amrenova	Kazakhstan	35.15	36.5	7.89	8.39	52.78	
27	4	Wang Jin	China	34.87	35.9	6.69	8.70	51.29	
28	23	Guan Ziyan	China	36.30	32.7	8.32	7.09	48.11	
29	27	Tetiana Petrova	Ukraine	36.69	31.5	8.04	6.65	46.19	
30	7	Seo Jung-hwa	South Korea	41.80	9.2	6.47	0.90	16.57	

==== Qualifying 2 ====
QF — Qualified for the final
Bib — Bib number
DNF — Did not finish
DNS — Did not start

Rank	Order	Name	Country	Qual 1	Time	Score			Total	Best	Notes
Rank	Order	Name	Country	Qual 1	Time	Turns	Air	Time	Total	Best	Notes
1	19	Tess Johnson	United States	65.55	30.97	50.0	12.23	13.10	75.33	75.33	QF
2	9	Ekaterina Stolyarova	Olympic Athletes from Russia	67.69	30.63	47.8	12.12	13.48	73.40	73.40	QF
3	11	Jakara Anthony	Australia	69.49	31.69	48.3	12.76	12.29	73.35	73.35	QF
4	10	Regina Rakhimova	Olympic Athletes from Russia	71.77	31.95	46.7	14.12	12.00	72.82	72.82	QF
5	5	Hedvig Wessel	Norway	68.64	30.03	44.9	12.60	14.16	71.66	71.66	QF
6	4	Seo Jung-hwa	South Korea	16.57	29.45	44.4	12.37	14.81	71.58	71.58	QF
7	1	Marika Pertakhiya	Olympic Athletes from Russia	70.43	36.98	16.8	7.79	6.33	30.92	70.43	QF
8	8	Chloé Dufour-Lapointe	Canada	69.53	29.45	43.4	10.27	14.81	68.48	69.53	QF
9	16	Katharina Förster	Germany	63.17	30.05	45.9	9.34	14.14	69.38	69.38	QF
10	15	Madii Himbury	Australia	68.98	31.44	45.8	10.99	12.57	69.36	69.36	QF
11	3	Deborah Scanzio	Switzerland	66.38	31.29	44.7	11.58	12.74	69.02	69.02	
12	20	Camille Cabrol	France	68.89	DNF					68.89	
13	18	Claudia Gueli	Australia	68.68	38.35	19.5	10.91	4.78	35.19	68.68	
14	7	Seo Jee-won	South Korea	68.46	31.55	44.2	7.96	12.45	64.61	68.46	
15	14	Léa Bouard	Germany	55.71	28.96	40.1	9.62	15.36	65.08	65.08	
16	6	Melanie Meilinger	Austria	54.95	34.61	41.2	7.51	9.00	57.71	57.71	
17	12	Ayaulum Amrenova	Kazakhstan	52.78	35.25	23.4	7.00	8.28	38.68	52.78	
18	13	Guan Ziyan	China	48.11	35.50	35.6	8.20	8.00	51.80	51.80	
19	2	Wang Jin	China	51.29	35.01	28.2	6.31	8.55	43.06	51.29	
20	17	Tetiana Petrova	Ukraine	46.19	37.62	14.3	3.16	5.61	23.07	46.19	

=== Final ===
==== Final 1 ====
In the first final round, the 12 best athletes qualified for the second final round.

Q — Qualified for next round

Rank	Order	Name	Country	Time	Score			Total	Notes
Rank	Order	Name	Country	Time	Turns	Air	Time	Total	Notes
1	17	Justine Dufour-Lapointe	Canada	29.70	50.6	14.37	14.53	79.50	Q
2	16	Jaelin Kauf	United States	28.79	50.7	12.47	15.56	78.73	Q
3	13	Keaton McCargo	United States	30.04	50.6	12.13	14.15	76.88	Q
4	8	Jakara Anthony	Australia	30.46	50.1	13.04	13.67	76.81	Q
5	15	Britteny Cox	Australia	29.19	48.1	12.59	15.10	75.79	Q
6	20	Perrine Laffont	France	29.33	48.1	12.71	14.95	75.76	Q
7	14	Yuliya Galysheva	Kazakhstan	30.62	47.3	14.31	13.49	75.10	Q
8	11	Audrey Robichaud	Canada	32.00	47.2	15.13	11.94	74.27	Q
9	10	Tess Johnson	United States	30.68	47.7	12.97	13.43	74.10	Q
10	19	Andi Naude	Canada	29.06	45.5	13.24	15.25	73.99	Q
11	7	Regina Rakhimova	Olympic Athletes from Russia	30.92	46.6	13.82	13.16	73.58	Q
12	9	Ekaterina Stolyarova	Olympic Athletes from Russia	30.52	48.0	11.62	13.61	73.23	Q
13	2	Katharina Förster	Germany	29.63	46.4	11.32	14.61	72.33	
14	5	Seo Jung-hwa	South Korea	29.77	45.0	12.86	14.45	72.31	
15	18	Morgan Schild	United States	30.80	45.5	13.44	13.29	72.23	
16	4	Marika Pertakhiya	Olympic Athletes from Russia	30.52	46.9	11.14	13.61	71.65	
17	3	Chloé Dufour-Lapointe	Canada	30.39	45.8	11.43	13.75	70.98	
18	12	Arisa Murata	Japan	30.51	44.8	12.35	13.62	70.77	
19	6	Hedvig Wessel	Norway	29.99	43.0	11.57	14.20	68.77	
20	1	Madii Himbury	Australia	31.03	42.5	12.66	13.03	68.19	

==== Final 2 ====
In the second final round, the six best athletes qualified for the third final round.

Q — Qualified for next round

Rank	Order	Name	Country	Time	Score			Total	Notes
Rank	Order	Name	Country	Time	Turns	Air	Time	Total	Notes
1	3	Andi Naude	Canada	28.98	48.2	15.24	15.34	78.78	Q
2	8	Britteny Cox	Australia	28.99	49.6	13.35	15.33	78.28	Q
3	7	Perrine Laffont	France	29.78	49.7	13.72	14.44	77.86	Q
4	12	Justine Dufour-Lapointe	Canada	29.70	49.1	13.85	14.53	77.48	Q
5	9	Jakara Anthony	Australia	30.48	50.4	12.80	13.65	76.85	Q
6	6	Yuliya Galysheva	Kazakhstan	30.65	47.6	15.75	13.46	76.81	Q
7	11	Jaelin Kauf	United States	28.74	47.3	13.12	15.61	76.03	
8	10	Keaton McCargo	United States	29.54	48.2	12.88	14.71	75.79	
9	5	Audrey Robichaud	Canada	32.47	48.2	15.28	11.41	74.89	
10	2	Regina Rakhimova	Olympic Athletes from Russia	30.87	46.0	14.34	13.21	73.55	
11	1	Ekaterina Stolyarova	Olympic Athletes from Russia	30.48	47.1	11.99	13.65	72.74	
12	4	Tess Johnson	United States	30.77	46.7	10.47	13.32	70.49	

==== Final 3 ====
The third final round determined the medalists.

Rank	Order	Name	Country	Time	Score			Total	Notes
Rank	Order	Name	Country	Time	Turns	Air	Time	Total	Notes
1st place, gold medalist(s)	4	Perrine Laffont	France	29.36	50.5	13.24	14.91	78.65	
2nd place, silver medalist(s)	3	Justine Dufour-Lapointe	Canada	29.54	49.4	14.45	14.71	78.56	
3rd place, bronze medalist(s)	1	Yuliya Galysheva	Kazakhstan	30.14	47.9	15.47	14.03	77.40	
4	2	Jakara Anthony	Australia	30.94	49.1	13.12	13.13	75.35	
5	5	Britteny Cox	Australia	28.29	47.3	11.66	16.12	75.08	
6	6	Andi Naude	Canada	DNF					
