= FIS Freestyle Ski and Snowboarding World Championships 2015 – Women's moguls =

The women's moguls competition of the FIS Freestyle Ski and Snowboarding World Championships 2015 was held at Kreischberg, Austria on January 18 (qualifying and finals). 36 athletes from 17 countries competed.

== Qualification ==
The following are the results of the qualification.

Rank	Bib	Name	Country	Q1	Q2	Notes
1	1	Justine Dufour-Lapointe	Canada	86.21		Q
2	2	Hannah Kearney	United States	84.70		Q
3	6	Britteny Cox	Australia	81.74		Q
4	5	Maxime Dufour-Lapointe	Canada	80.85		Q
5	11	Yulia Galysheva	Kazakhstan	80.42		Q
6	9	Nikola Sudova	Czech Republic	80.24		Q
7	20	Sophia Schwartz	United States	79.55		Q
8	14	Junko Hoshino	Japan	77.57		Q
9	25	Marika Pertakhiya	Russia	77.05		Q
10	21	Ali Kariotis	United States	74.87	79.68	Q
11	13	Keaton McCargo	United States	75.54	77.57	Q
12	18	Regina Rakhimova	Russia	73.66	76.76	Q
13	8	Deborah Scanzio	Switzerland	76.96	75.92	Q
14	4	KC Oakley	United States	76.86	75.62	Q
15	17	Hedvig Wessel	Norway	72.69	74.97	Q
16	27	Julia Nilsson	Sweden	71.04	74.28	Q
17	12	Perrine Laffont	France	74.19	74.09	Q
18	26	Laura Grasemann	Germany	70.37	73.47	Q
19	16	Seo Jee-won	South Korea	72.61	72.71	
20	29	Aurora Amundsen	Norway	69.02	71.70	
21	39	Lara Frost	Germany	65.02	68.30	
22	28	Katharina Foerster	Germany	59.65	67.88	
23	31	Ellie Koyander	Great Britain	68.18	67.33	
24	32	Azusa Ito	Japan	66.55	64.63	
25	35	Ning Qin	China	64.51	62.51	
26	19	Satsuki Ito	Japan	74.99	61.11	
27	38	Melanie Meilinger	Austria	52.99	58.20	
28	30	Ako Iwamoto	Japan	69.38	33.46	
29	22	Nicole Parks	Australia	68.84	DNF	
30	40	Karin Hackl	Austria	51.41		
31	36	Nina Kern	Austria	49.82		
32	3	Chloe Dufour-Lapointe	Canada	48.29		
33	34	Tetiana Petrova	Ukraine	46.67		
34	10	Andi Naude	Canada	44.54		
35	37	Katharina Ramsauer	Austria	44.00		
36	33	Seo Jung-hwa	South Korea	40.18		

== Final ==
The following are the results of the finals.

Rank	Bib	Name	Country	Final 1	Final 2
1st place, gold medalist(s)	1	Justine Dufour-Lapointe	Canada	83.19	87.25
2nd place, silver medalist(s)	2	Hannah Kearney	United States	82.58	85.66
3rd place, bronze medalist(s)	6	Britteny Cox	Australia	82.56	81.98
4	5	Maxime Dufour-Lapointe	Canada	81.26	80.92
5	11	Yulia Galysheva	Kazakhstan	81.08	79.30
6	18	Regina Rakhimova	Russia	79.61	78.47
7	8	Deborah Scanzio	Switzerland	79.51	
8	21	Ali Kariotis	United States	78.33	
9	26	Laura Grasemann	Germany	78.14	
10	25	Marika Pertakhiya	Russia	76.14	
11	14	Junko Hoshino	Japan	75.12	
12	13	Keaton McCargo	United States	75.07	
13	12	Perrine Laffont	France	74.84	
14	17	Hedvig Wessel	Norway	74.64	
15	27	Julia Nilsson	Sweden	73.58	
16	9	Nikola Sudova	Czech Republic	73.41	
17	20	Sophia Schwartz	United States	72.73	
18	4	KC Oakley	United States	34.66	
