= FIS Freestyle Ski and Snowboarding World Championships 2015 – Women's dual moguls =

The women's moguls competition of the FIS Freestyle Ski and Snowboarding World Championships 2015 was held at Kreischberg, Austria on January 19 (qualifying and finals). 35 athletes from 17 countries competed.

== Qualification ==
The following are the results of the qualification.

Rank	Bib	Name	Country	Score	Notes
1	2	Hannah Kearney	United States	82.82	Q
2	1	Justine Dufour-Lapointe	Canada	82.28	Q
3	3	Chloe Dufour-Lapointe	Canada	78.47	Q
4	5	Maxime Dufour-Lapointe	Canada	77.31	Q
5	11	Yulia Galysheva	Kazakhstan	77.13	Q
6	14	Junko Hoshino	Japan	76.48	Q
7	6	Britteny Cox	Australia	76.24	Q
8	12	Perrine Laffont	France	75.86	Q
9	26	Laura Grasemann	Germany	75.19	Q
10	10	Andi Naude	Canada	75.10	Q
11	18	Regina Rakhimova	Russia	74.51	Q
12	33	Seo Jung-hwa	South Korea	74.35	Q
13	7	Audrey Robichaud	Canada	73.71	Q
14	13	Keaton McCargo	United States	73.05	Q
15	16	Seo Jee-won	South Korea	72.58	Q
16	21	Ali Kariotis	United States	72.14	Q
17	25	Marika Pertakhiya	Russia	71.84	
18	9	Nikola Sudova	Czech Republic	71.33	
19	8	Deborah Scanzio	Switzerland	70.83	
20	29	Aurora Amundsen	Norway	69.93	
21	30	Ako Iwamoto	Japan	67.25	
22	19	Satsuki Ito	Japan	66.47	
23	31	Ellie Koyander	Great Britain	66.15	
24	27	Julia Nilsson	Sweden	65.77	
25	17	Hedvig Wessel	Norway	65.32	
26	32	Azusa Ito	Japan	63.76	
27	20	Sophia Schwartz	United States	60.86	
28	39	Lara Frost	Germany	60.65	
29	28	Katharina Foerster	Germany	55.88	
30	38	Melanie Meilinger	Austria	53.17	
31	34	Tetiana Petrova	Ukraine	45.77	
32	37	Katharina Ramsauer	Austria	36.56	
33	35	Ning Qin	China	14.18	
	36	Nina Kern	Austria	DNF	
	40	Karin Hackl	Austria	DNF	

== Final Bracket ==
The following are the results of the finals.

Round of 16
1	Hannah Kearney (USA)	29
16	Ali Kariotis (USA)	6
8	Perrine Laffont (FRA)	19
9	Laura Grasemann (GER)	16
5	Yulia Galysheva (KAZ)	35
12	Seo Jung-hwa (KOR)	0
4	Maxime Dufour-Lapointe (CAN)	15
13	Audrey Robichaud (CAN)	20
3	Chloe Dufour-Lapointe (CAN)	21
14	Keaton McCargo (USA)	14
6	Junko Hushino (JPN)	13
11	Regina Rakhimova (RUS)	22
7	Britteny Cox (AUS)	22
10	Andi Naude (CAN)	13
2	Justine Dufour-Lapointe (CAN)	25
15	Seo Jee-won (KOR)	10

Quarterfinals
1	Hannah Kearney (USA)	27
8	Perrine Laffont (FRA)	8
5	Yulia Galysheva (KAZ)	21
13	Audrey Robichaud (CAN)	14
3	Chloe Dufour-Lapointe (CAN)	28
11	Regina Rakhimova (RUS)	7
7	Britteny Cox (AUS)	12
2	Justine Dufour-Lapointe (CAN)	23

Semifinals
1	Hannah Kearney (USA)	18
5	Yulia Galysheva (KAZ)	17
3	Chloe Dufour-Lapointe (CAN)	9
2	Justine Dufour-Lapointe (CAN)	26

Finals
1	Hannah Kearney (USA)	29 (gold)
2	Justine Dufour-Lapointe (CAN)	6 (silver)
Third place
5	Yulia Galysheva (KAZ)	18 (bronze)
3	Chloe Dufour-Lapointe (CAN)	17
