= FIS Freestyle World Ski Championships 2013 – Women's moguls =

The women's moguls competition of the FIS Freestyle World Ski Championships 2013 was held at Myrkdalen-Voss, Norway on March 5 (qualifying) and March 6 (finals). 37 athletes from 17 countries competed.

== Results ==
=== Qualification ===
The following are the results of the qualification.

Rank	Bib	Name	Country	Run 1	Run 2	Notes
1	1	Hannah Kearney	United States	26.54		Q
2	8	Aiko Uemura	Japan	24.74		Q
3	3	Heather McPhie	United States	24.08		Q
4	5	Chloé Dufour-Lapointe	Canada	23.86		Q
5	10	Mikaela Matthews	United States	22.83		Q
6	4	Eliza Outtrim	United States	22.75		Q
7	7	Nikola Sudová	Czech Republic	22.73		Q
8	6	Miki Itō	Japan	22.63		Q
9	16	Britteny Cox	Australia	22.63		Q
10	22	Marika Pertakhiya	Russia	22.41		Q
11	2	Justine Dufour-Lapointe	Canada	14.93	24.14	Q
12	15	Arisa Murata	Japan	21.43	22.37	Q
13	9	Audrey Robichaud	Canada	22.25	22.12	Q
14	23	Seo Jung-Hwa	South Korea	18.72	21.65	Q
15	40	Deborah Scanzio	Italy	19.68	21.19	Q
16	12	Yulia Galysheva	Kazakhstan	21.25	20.79	Q
17	14	Andi Naude	Canada	5.26	20.29	Q
18	29	Nicole Parks	Australia	21.21	20.16	Q
19	19	Regina Rakhimova	Russia	19.11	20.01	
20	24	Elena Muratova	Russia	20.15	19.93	
21	27	Ning Qin	China	21.26	19.85	
22	31	Emilie Klingen Amundsen	Norway	19.05	19.29	
23	20	Hedvig Wessel	Norway	20.60	19.07	
24	26	Tereza Vaculíková	Czech Republic	18.36	18.72	
25	25	Darya Rybalova	Kazakhstan	13.36	18.42	
26	21	Junko Hoshino	Japan	16.13	17.64	
27	35	Julia Nilsson	Sweden	17.33	17.50	
28	30	Seo Jee-Won	South Korea	DNF	15.96	
29	34	Aurora Amundsen	Norway	18.91	15.89	
30	42	Nina Bednarik	Slovenia	14.71	12.74	
31	38	Karin Hackl	Austria	12.84	12.28	
32	39	Claudia Kohler	Austria	14.51	11.89	
33	33	Reyes Santa-Olalla	Spain	11.55	11.26	
34	32	Melanie Meilinger	Austria	11.66	11.18	
35	36	Maj-Beldring Henningsen	Denmark	9.48	8.98	
36	41	Thea Johnsen Berg	Norway	10.96	8.09	
37	37	Ellie Koyander	Great Britain	18.16	2.54	

=== Final ===
The following are the results of the final.

Rank	Bib	Name	Country	Run 1	Run 2	Notes
1st place, gold medalist(s)	1	Hannah Kearney	United States	26.48	26.70	
2nd place, silver medalist(s)	6	Miki Itō	Japan	25.18	24.92	
3rd place, bronze medalist(s)	2	Justine Dufour-Lapointe	Canada	24.95	23.48	
4	3	Heather McPhie	United States	25.49	22.98	
5	8	Aiko Uemura	Japan	24.62	22.24	
6	15	Arisa Murata	Japan	24.83	15.29	
7	7	Nikola Sudová	Czech Republic	24.60		
8	5	Chloé Dufour-Lapointe	Canada	24.44		
9	22	Marika Pertakhiya	Russia	24.39		
10	16	Britteny Cox	Australia	23.74		
11	9	Audrey Robichaud	Canada	23.41		
12	14	Andi Naude	Canada	23.36		
13	4	Eliza Outtrim	United States	23.32		
14	10	Mikaela Matthews	United States	23.22		
15	40	Deborah Scanzio	Italy	22.70		
16	23	Seo Jung-Hwa	South Korea	22.60		
17	12	Yulia Galysheva	Kazakhstan	22.49		
18	29	Nicole Parks	Australia	21.53		
