= FIS Freestyle Ski and Snowboarding World Championships 2019 – Women's dual moguls =

Women's dual moguls at the FIS Freestyle Ski and Snowboarding World Championships 2019
- Venue: Deer Valley
- Location: Utah, United States
- Dates: February 9
- Competitors: 30

Medalists
gold medal	Perrine Laffont	France
silver medal	Jaelin Kauf	United States
bronze medal	Tess Johnson	United States

The Women's dual moguls competition at the FIS Freestyle Ski and Snowboarding World Championships 2019 was held on February 9, 2019.

== Qualification ==
=== Top half ===
Round of 32
24	(Kazakhstan) Ayaulym Amrenova	14.49
16	(Japan) Kisara Sumiyoshi	72.05
9	(Germany) Laura Grasemann	66.14
29	(China) Ma Zhuoni	12.02
18	(United Kingdom) Leonie Gerken Schofield	61.08
8	(Canada) Chloé Dufour-Lapointe	DNF

Round of 16
1	(France) Perrine Laffont	85.37
16	(Japan) Kisara Sumiyoshi	74.74
9	(Germany) Laura Grasemann	82.72
18	(United Kingdom) Leonie Gerken Schofield	65.91

Quarterfinals
1	(France) Perrine Laffont	82.23
9	(Germany) Laura Grasemann	80.33

Round of 32
5	(Australia) Britteny Cox
25	(South Korea) Park Sung-youn	DNS
23	(China) Guan Ziyan	DNF
12	(Japan) Junko Hoshino	74.11
13	(United States) Nessa Dziemian	69.14
27	(Norway) Aurora Amundsen	73.73
17	(South Korea) Seo Jung-hwa	22.71
4	(Kazakhstan) Yuliya Galysheva	82.51

Round of 16
5	(Australia) Britteny Cox	60.27
12	(Japan) Junko Hoshino	78.74
27	(Norway) Aurora Amundsen	68.45
4	(Kazakhstan) Yuliya Galysheva	83.34

Quarterfinals
12	(Japan) Junko Hoshino	72.93
4	(Kazakhstan) Yuliya Galysheva	82.12

=== Bottom half ===
Round of 32
3	(Australia) Jakara Anthony	78.96
20	(Sweden) Thea Wallberg	DNF
26	(South Korea) Seo Jee-won	DNF
14	(Canada) Sofiane Gagnon	68.56
11	(United States) Olivia Giaccio	19.44
19	(Australia) Taylah O'Neill	73.39
28	(Sweden) Josefina Wersen	DNF
6	(United States) Tess Johnson	71.72

Round of 16
3	(Australia) Jakara Anthony	79.15
14	(Canada) Sofiane Gagnon	76.34
19	(Australia) Taylah O'Neill	DNF
6	(United States) Tess Johnson	80.63

Quarterfinals
3	(Australia) Jakara Anthony	64.29
6	(United States) Tess Johnson	82.22

Round of 32
7	(Canada) Justine Dufour-Lapointe	69.84
31	(China) Ning Qin	DNF
30	(Ukraine) Viktoriia Pryimak	DNF
10	(Japan) Hinako Tomitaka	76.69
15	(Russia) Anastasia Smirnova	74.67
22	(China) Wang Jin	9.50
21	(Australia) Sophie Ash	32.05
2	(United States) Jaelin Kauf	77.33

Round of 16
7	(Canada) Justine Dufour-Lapointe	70.99
10	(Japan) Hinako Tomitaka	72.53
15	(Russia) Anastasia Smirnova	77.16
2	(United States) Jaelin Kauf	82.27

Quarterfinals
10	(Japan) Hinako Tomitaka	34.94
2	(United States) Jaelin Kauf	78.01

== Finals ==
Semifinals
1	(France) Perrine Laffont	84.88
4	(Kazakhstan) Yuliya Galysheva	81.37
6	(United States) Tess Johnson	73.56
2	(United States) Jaelin Kauf	79.97

Finals
1	(France) Perrine Laffont	84.74
2	(United States) Jaelin Kauf	82.59
Third place
4	(Kazakhstan) Yuliya Galysheva	79.28
6	(United States) Tess Johnson	82.60
