= FIS Freestyle Ski and Snowboarding World Championships 2019 – Women's moguls =

Women's moguls at the FIS Freestyle Ski and Snowboarding World Championships 2019
- Venue: Deer Valley
- Location: Utah, United States
- Dates: February 8
- Competitors: 33 from 14 nations
- Winning points: 79.14

Medalists
gold medal	Yuliya Galysheva	Kazakhstan
silver medal	Jakara Anthony	Australia
bronze medal	Perrine Laffont	France

The Women's moguls competition at the FIS Freestyle Ski and Snowboarding World Championships 2019 was held on February 8, 2019.

== Qualification ==
The qualification was started at 12:45. The best 18 skiers qualified for the final.

Rank	Bib	Start order	Name	Country	Q1	Q2	Notes
1	2	5	Jakara Anthony	Australia	75.80		Q
2	1	2	Perrine Laffont	France	75.11		Q
3	9	11	Justine Dufour-Lapointe	Canada	69.81		Q
4	3	19	Jaelin Kauf	United States	68.83		Q
5	4	16	Yuliya Galysheva	Kazakhstan	68.08		Q
6	8	23	Hinako Tomitaka	Japan	65.10		Q
7	19	6	Seo Jung-hwa	South Korea	64.90		Q
8	21	17	Maïa Schwinghammer	Canada	64.47		Q
9	13	12	Sofiane Gagnon	Canada	64.08		Q
10	12	25	Nessa Dziemian	United States	60.85	64.92	Q
11	14	18	Anastasia Smirnova	Russia	61.77	62.15	Q
12	6	24	Chloé Dufour-Lapointe	Canada	58.90	62.07	Q
13	5	3	Tess Johnson	United States	DNF	60.86	Q
14	26	4	Thea Wallberg	Sweden	56.59	48.87	Q
15	20	29	Makayla Gerken Schofield	Great Britain	55.36	52.38	Q
16	28	30	Sophie Ash	Australia	49.18	53.44	Q
17	11	15	Junko Hoshino	Japan	39.06	53.20	Q
18	24	9	Taylah O'Neill	Australia	47.45	52.95	Q
19	27	28	Claudia Gueli	Australia	51.57	DNF	
20	10	21	Britteny Cox	Australia	50.01	47.14	
21	18	22	Kisara Sumiyoshi	Japan	48.18	DNF	
22	32	27	Ayaulum Amrenova	Kazakhstan	47.03	44.53	
23	33	10	Park Sung-youn	South Korea	36.26	39.61	
24	34	8	Seo Jee-won	South Korea	30.79	15.90	
25	15	20	Olivia Giaccio	United States	21.71	30.25	
26	7	1	Laura Grasemann	Germany	24.33	27.95	
27	30	26	Guan Ziyan	China	6.36	21.32	
28	35	7	Aurora Amundsen	Norway	16.89	DNF	
29	39	32	Viktoriia Pryimak	Ukraine	6.13	7.37	
30	36	33	Josefina Wersén	Sweden	5.65	DNF	
31	37	34	Ma Zhuoni	China	4.63	4.83	
32	29	14	Wang Jin	China	4.74	DNS	
33	38	31	Ning Qin	China	DNF	1.27	
	31	13	Kristine Gullachsen	Norway	Did not started		

== Final ==
The final was started at 19:00.

Rank	Bib	Name	Country	Final 1	Final 2
1st place, gold medalist(s)	4	Yuliya Galysheva	Kazakhstan	74.48	79.14
2nd place, silver medalist(s)	2	Jakara Anthony	Australia	79.58	78.99
3rd place, bronze medalist(s)	1	Perrine Laffont	France	78.31	78.70
4	14	Anastasia Smirnova	Russia	70.63	72.67
5	9	Justine Dufour-Lapointe	Canada	72.67	71.25
6	3	Jaelin Kauf	United States	76.71	66.41
7	6	Chloé Dufour-Lapointe	Canada	70.13	
8	8	Hinako Tomitaka	Japan	68.68	
9	11	Junko Hoshino	Japan	68.47	
10	13	Sofiane Gagnon	Canada	67.73	
11	20	Makayla Gerken Schofield	Great Britain	66.32	
12	5	Tess Johnson	United States	66.11	
13	24	Taylah O'Neill	Australia	64.68	
14	12	Nessa Dziemian	United States	59.22	
15	28	Sophie Ash	Australia	59.18	
16	26	Thea Wallberg	Sweden	56.30	
17	19	Seo Jung-hwa	South Korea	34.46	
18	21	Maïa Schwinghammer	Canada	DNS	
