= Freestyle skiing at the 2014 Winter Olympics – Women's moguls =

Women's moguls at the XXII Olympic Winter Games
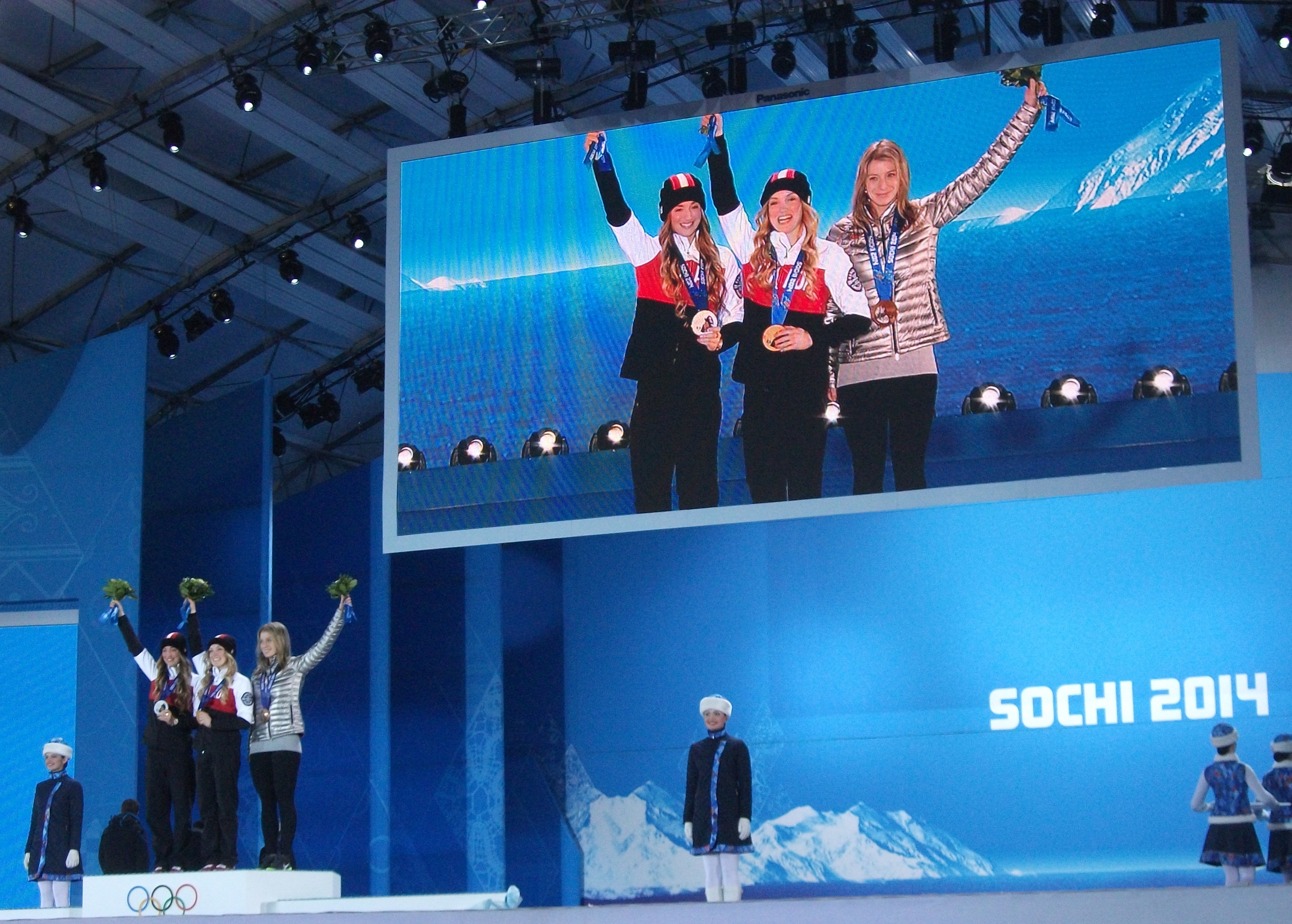
- The Medalists
- Venue: Rosa Khutor Extreme Park, Krasnaya Polyana, Russia
- Dates: 6 February 2014 (qualification); 8 February 2014 (final)
- Competitors: 30 from 13 nations
- Winning Score: 22.44

Medalists
1st place, gold medalist(s)		Justine Dufour-Lapointe	Canada
2nd place, silver medalist(s)		Chloé Dufour-Lapointe	Canada
3rd place, bronze medalist(s)		Hannah Kearney	United States

The women's moguls event in freestyle skiing at the 2014 Winter Olympics in Sochi, Russia took place on the 6 February (first qualification) and 8 February (second qualification, semifinals, and final) at the Rosa Khutor Extreme Park in Krasnaya Polyana, Sochi.

The defending Olympic and world champion was Hannah Kearney of the United States. Kearney returned to the podium, winning the 2014 bronze medal. The first two places were won by sisters, for only the fourth time in Olympic history: Canadian Justine Dufour-Lapointe earned gold while her sister Chloé won the silver. The third Dufour-Lapointe sister on the Canadian team, Maxime, made it to Final 2 in the event. Maxime, Justine, and Chloé Dufour-Lapointe became the first three sisters in Olympics history to compete in the same event. This was Justine Dufour-Lapointe's first Olympics, whereas Chloé was ranked fifth in Vancouver 2010.

== Qualification ==
An athlete must have placed in the top 30 in at a World Cup event after July 2012 or at the 2013 World Championships and a minimum of 80 FIS points. A total of 30 quota spots were available to athletes to compete at the games. A maximum of 4 athletes could be entered by a National Olympic Committee.

== Results ==
=== Qualification ===
In the first qualifying round, the ten best athletes directly qualified for the final. Others competed in the second qualification round.

==== Qualifying 1 ====
QF — Qualified directly for the final
QS — Qualified for the semifinal
Bib — Bib number
DNF — Did not finish
DNS — Did not start

Rank	Bib	Name	Country	Time	Score			Total	Notes
Rank	Bib	Name	Country	Time	Turns	Air	Time	Total	Notes
1	1	Hannah Kearney	United States	30.14	12.6	4.46	5.99	23.05	QF
2	3	Chloé Dufour-Lapointe	Canada	30.80	12.3	4.62	5.72	22.64	QF
3	2	Justine Dufour-Lapointe	Canada	32.02	12.3	4.74	5.24	22.28	QF
4	7	Eliza Outtrim	United States	30.79	11.1	4.68	5.73	21.51	QF
5	18	Perrine Laffont	France	31.92	11.2	4.86	5.28	21.34	QF
6	6	Yulia Galysheva	Kazakhstan	30.89	10.4	5.08	5.69	21.17	QF
7	12	Aiko Uemura	Japan	30.74	10.7	4.56	5.75	21.01	QF
8	5	Maxime Dufour-Lapointe	Canada	31.22	11.3	4.02	5.56	20.88	QF
9	30	Audrey Robichaud	Canada	33.55	11.0	4.98	4.63	20.61	QF
10	15	Regina Rakhimova	Russia	31.02	10.4	4.44	5.64	20.48	QF
11	13	Nikola Sudová	Czech Republic	31.30	10.9	3.96	5.52	20.38	
12	8	Britteny Cox	Australia	31.74	10.4	4.44	5.35	20.19	
13	16	Deborah Scanzio	Italy	30.56	9.7	4.50	5.82	20.02	
14	10	Heather McPhie	United States	31.65	10.3	4.23	5.39	19.92	
15	14	Junko Hoshino	Japan	30.95	9.5	4.56	5.66	19.72	
16	28	Taylah O'Neill	Australia	33.14	10.0	3.78	4.79	18.57	
17	21	Nicole Parks	Australia	31.45	9.0	4.02	5.47	18.49	
18	34	Elena Muratova	Russia	31.65	9.2	3.36	5.39	17.95	
19	23	Marika Pertakhiya	Russia	29.64	7.5	3.84	6.19	17.53	
20	33	Tereza Vaculíková	Czech Republic	34.03	9.3	3.72	4.44	17.46	
21	31	Ning Qin	China	32.10	7.5	4.12	5.21	16.83	
22	24	Arisa Murata	Japan	31.33	7.0	4.18	5.51	16.69	
23	27	Darya Rybalova	Kazakhstan	33.34	8.7	2.83	4.71	16.24	
24	32	Seo Jee-Won	South Korea	33.49	8.9	2.40	4.65	15.95	
25	19	Ekaterina Stolyarova	Russia	38.78	3.5	2.4	2.54	8.44	
26	22	Laura Grasemann	Germany	37.72	0.3	3.54	2.97	6.81	
—	26	Hedvig Wessel	Norway	DNF					
—	4	Heidi Kloser	United States	DNS					
—	29	Seo Jung-Hwa	South Korea	DNS					
—	35	Miki Itō	Japan	DNS					

==== Qualifying 2 ====
Q — Qualified for the final
Bib — Bib number
DNF — Did not finish
DNS — Did not start

Rank	Bib	Name	Country	Time	Score			Total	Notes
Rank	Bib	Name	Country	Time	Turns	Air	Time	Total	Notes
1	19	Ekaterina Stolyarova	Russia	31.97	10.9	5.16	5.26	21.32	Q
2	16	Deborah Scanzio	Italy	31.04	11.0	4.38	5.63	21.01	Q
3	13	Nikola Sudová	Czech Republic	31.48	11.5	3.48	5.45	20.43	Q
4	8	Britteny Cox	Australia	31.48	10.1	4.38	5.45	19.93	Q
5	24	Arisa Murata	Japan	32.65	9.7	4.69	4.99	19.38	Q
6	10	Heather McPhie	United States	31.21	9.7	3.59	5.56	18.85	Q
7	28	Taylah O'Neill	Australia	33.39	9.4	3.72	4.69	17.81	Q
8	21	Nicole Parks	Australia	32.65	8.7	4.08	4.99	17.77	Q
9	31	Ning Qin	China	31.60	8.8	3.54	5.41	17.75	Q
10	23	Marika Pertakhiya	Russia	31.10	7.8	3.54	5.60	16.94	Q
11	34	Elena Muratova	Russia	33.36	9.3	2.64	4.70	16.64	
12	22	Laura Grasemann	Germany	33.46	7.3	3.80	4.66	15.76	
13	32	Seo Jee-Won	South Korea	33.02	7.8	2.76	4.84	15.40	
14	29	Seo Jung-Hwa	South Korea	33.56	6.6	2.94	4.62	14.16	
15	14	Junko Hoshino	Japan	32.37	1.4	3.12	5.10	9.62	
16	26	Hedvig Wessel	Norway	36.47	1.0	1.74	3.47	6.21	
	33	Tereza Vaculíková	Czech Republic	DNF					
	27	Darya Rybalova	Kazakhstan	DNS					
	4	Heidi Kloser	United States	DNS					
	35	Miki Itō	Japan	DNS					

=== Final ===
The finals were started at 22:00.

==== Final 1 ====
Q — Qualified for next round
Bib — Bib number
DNF — Did not finish
DNS — Did not start

Rank	Bib	Name	Country	Time	Score			Total	Notes
Rank	Bib	Name	Country	Time	Turns	Air	Time	Total	Notes
1	13	Nikola Sudová	Czech Republic	30.76	12.0	4.08	5.74	21.82	Q
2	7	Eliza Outtrim	United States	31.70	11.7	4.74	5.37	21.81	Q
3	3	Chloé Dufour-Lapointe	Canada	31.90	12.1	4.26	5.29	21.65	Q
4	2	Justine Dufour-Lapointe	Canada	31.82	11.3	4.92	5.32	21.54	Q
5	6	Yulia Galysheva	Kazakhstan	30.73	10.8	4.71	5.75	21.26	Q
6	15	Regina Rakhimova	Russia	31.84	10.9	4.98	5.31	21.19	Q
7	1	Hannah Kearney	United States	31.54	11.6	3.92	5.43	20.95	Q
8	8	Britteny Cox	Australia	30.87	10.2	4.98	5.70	20.88	Q
9	22	Aiko Uemura	Japan	30.68	10.4	4.26	5.77	20.43	Q
10	10	Audrey Robichaud	Canada	33.20	10.9	4.74	4.77	20.41	Q
11	5	Maxime Dufour-Lapointe	Canada	31.90	10.9	4.14	5.29	20.33	Q
12	16	Deborah Scanzio	Italy	29.94	9.8	4.25	6.07	20.12	Q
13	10	Heather McPhie	United States	30.24	10.0	4.10	5.95	20.05	
14	18	Perrine Laffont	France	32.82	10.2	3.66	4.92	18.78	
15	21	Nicole Parks	Australia	32.05	9.3	3.84	5.23	18.37	
16	28	Taylah O'Neill	Australia	33.03	9.8	3.54	4.84	18.18	
17	23	Marika Pertakhiya	Russia	31.11	8.5	3.48	5.60	17.58	
18	31	Ning Qin	China	32.04	7.8	4.23	5.23	17.26	
19	19	Ekaterina Stolyarova	Russia	34.85	4.0	2.88	4.11	10.99	
	24	Arisa Murata	Japan	DNS					

Yekaterina Stolyarova fell after the second jump, was still able to complete the distance but was ranked last.

==== Final 2 ====
Q — Qualified for next round
Bib — Bib number
DNF — Did not finish
DNS — Did not start

Rank	Bib	Name	Country	Time	Score			Total	Notes
Rank	Bib	Name	Country	Time	Turns	Air	Time	Total	Notes
1	1	Hannah Kearney	United States	31.18	11.3	5.06	5.57	21.93	Q
2	3	Chloé Dufour-Lapointe	Canada	31.97	12.0	4.44	5.26	21.70	Q
3	2	Justine Dufour-Lapointe	Canada	31.96	11.7	4.68	5.26	21.64	Q
4	8	Britteny Cox	Australia	30.73	10.8	5.04	5.75	21.59	Q
5	7	Eliza Outtrim	United States	31.90	11.2	5.04	5.29	21.53	Q
6	22	Aiko Uemura	Japan	31.19	10.9	4.68	5.57	21.15	Q
7	6	Yulia Galysheva	Kazakhstan	30.52	10.8	4.48	5.84	21.12	
8	15	Regina Rakhimova	Russia	31.89	11.1	4.68	5.29	21.07	
9	13	Nikola Sudová	Czech Republic	32.09	11.8	3.96	5.21	20.97	
10	10	Audrey Robichaud	Canada	33.50	10.9	4.80	4.65	20.35	
11	16	Deborah Scanzio	Italy	29.59	9.6	4.26	6.21	20.07	
12	5	Maxime Dufour-Lapointe	Canada	31.25	9.8	3.30	5.54	18.64	

==== Final 3 ====
Rank	Bib	Name	Country	Time	Score			Total	Notes
Rank	Bib	Name	Country	Time	Turns	Air	Time	Total	Notes
1st place, gold medalist(s)	2	Justine Dufour-Lapointe	Canada	31.56	12.1	4.92	5.42	22.44	
2nd place, silver medalist(s)	3	Chloé Dufour-Lapointe	Canada	31.71	12.1	4.20	5.36	21.66	
3rd place, bronze medalist(s)	1	Hannah Kearney	United States	31.04	11.1	4.76	5.63	21.49	
4	22	Aiko Uemura	Japan	30.46	10.6	4.20	5.86	20.66	
5	8	Britteny Cox	Australia	31.19	10.2	3.66	5.57	19.43	
6	7	Eliza Outtrim	United States	31.49	9.9	4.02	5.45	19.37	
