= FIS Freestyle Ski and Snowboarding World Championships 2021 – Women's moguls =

Women's moguls at the FIS Freestyle Ski and Snowboarding World Championships 2021
- Venue: Shymbulak
- Location: Almaty, Kazakhstan
- Date: 8 March
- Competitors: 34 from 13 nations
- Winning points: 82.11

Medalists
gold medal	Perrine Laffont	France
silver medal	Yuliya Galysheva	Kazakhstan
bronze medal	Anastasiia Smirnova

The Women's moguls competition at the FIS Freestyle Ski and Snowboarding World Championships 2021 was held on 8 March 2021.

== Qualification ==
The qualification was started at 09:30. The best 18 skiers qualified for the final.

Rank	Bib	Start order	Name	Country	Q1	Q2	Notes
1	1	13	Perrine Laffont	France	79.41		Q
2	14	19	Yuliya Galysheva	Kazakhstan	78.23		Q
3	19	22	Viktoriia Lazarenko	Russian Ski Federation	77.17		Q
4	13	24	Anastasiia Smirnova	Russian Ski Federation	76.65		Q
5	4	9	Kai Owens	United States	75.07		Q
6	10	12	Jakara Anthony	Australia	74.87		Q
7	5	23	Jaelin Kauf	United States	73.93		Q
8	6	26	Tess Johnson	United States	73.76		Q
9	3	11	Hannah Soar	United States	72.23		Q
10	7	14	Hinako Tomitaka	Japan	71.84	75.96	Q
11	9	10	Justine Dufour-Lapointe	Canada	70.81	74.72	Q
12	25	15	Chloé Dufour-Lapointe	Canada	71.58	69.51	Q
13	15	17	Britteny Cox	Australia	71.03	71.22	Q
14	11	3	Junko Hoshino	Japan	62.72	70.93	Q
15	23	18	Anastassiya Gorodko	Kazakhstan	68.58	70.76	Q
16	8	20	Kisara Sumiyoshi	Japan	69.53	DNF	Q
17	27	5	Anastasiia Pervushina	Russian Ski Federation	67.15	66.51	Q
18	12	16	Makayla Gerken Schofield	Great Britain	66.62	DNF	Q
19	26	4	Sofiane Gagnon	Canada	66.27	DNF	
20	2	2	Anri Kawamura	Japan	65.89	DNF	
21	18	1	Camille Cabrol	France	62.76	65.17	
22	28	27	Ayaulym Amrenova	Kazakhstan	64.64	64.88	
23	36	28	Sophie Weese	Germany	64.58	57.45	
24	29	7	Hanna Weese	Germany	48.67	60.63	
25	32	6	Skyler Nunn	Great Britain	58.38	59.90	
26	40	35	Olessya Graur	Kazakhstan	54.40	58.83	
27	30	25	Melanie Meilinger	Austria	57.37	56.52	
28	34	8	Nicole Gasparini	Switzerland	DNF	55.90	
29	41	31	Katharina Ramsauer	Austria	50.28	54.99	
30	39	32	Yuliia Brudko	Ukraine	48.88	51.87	
31	37	34	Dorota Šamánková	Czech Republic	51.35	49.26	
32	31	30	Ekaterina Ogneva	Russian Ski Federation	41.89	48.78	
33	33	21	Lena Mayer	Germany	19.62	34.49	
34	35	29	Eliška Coufalová	Czech Republic	29.37	DNF	
	38	33	Viktoriia Pryimak	Ukraine	Did not start		

== Final ==
The final was started at 15:00.

Rank	Bib	Name	Country	Final 1	Final 2
1st place, gold medalist(s)	1	Perrine Laffont	France	81.65	82.11
2nd place, silver medalist(s)	14	Yuliya Galysheva	Kazakhstan	82.54	79.52
3rd place, bronze medalist(s)	13	Anastasiia Smirnova	Russian Ski Federation	78.69	79.41
4	10	Jakara Anthony	Australia	77.59	77.40
5	7	Hinako Tomitaka	Japan	78.06	76.45
6	4	Kai Owens	United States	77.30	DNF
7	15	Britteny Cox	Australia	77.03	—
8	5	Jaelin Kauf	United States	76.75	—
9	19	Viktoriia Lazarenko	Russian Ski Federation	76.28	—
10	3	Hannah Soar	United States	76.12	—
11	6	Tess Johnson	United States	75.59	—
12	9	Justine Dufour-Lapointe	Canada	75.49	—
13	23	Anastassiya Gorodko	Kazakhstan	74.23	—
14	8	Kisara Sumiyoshi	Japan	74.05	—
15	11	Junko Hoshino	Japan	73.53	—
16	25	Chloé Dufour-Lapointe	Canada	73.01	—
17	12	Makayla Gerken Schofield	Great Britain	72.47	—
18	27	Anastasiia Pervushina	Russian Ski Federation	71.84	—
