= Justine Dufour-Lapointe =

Canadian freestyle skier

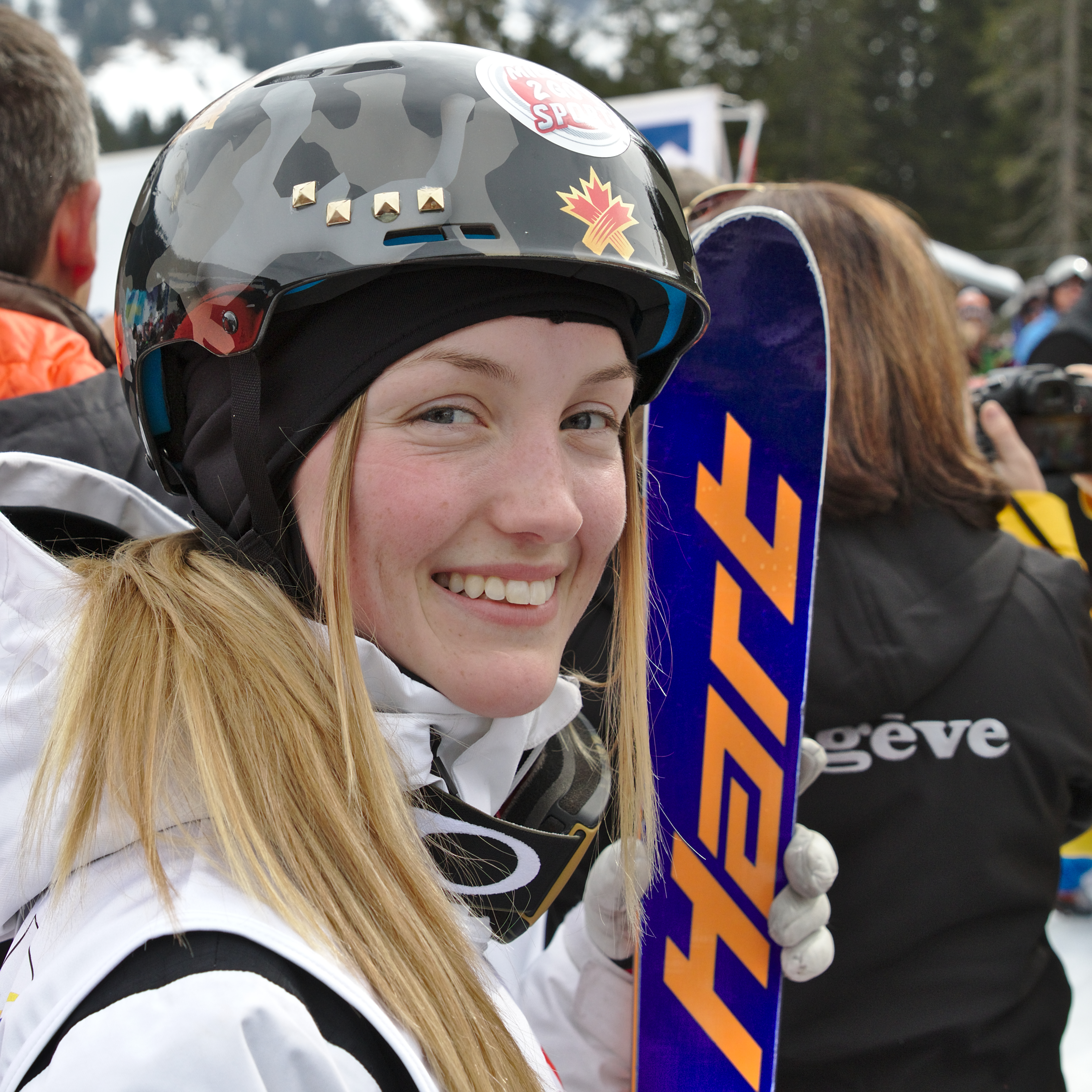
- Justine Dufour-Lapointe in March 2015

Personal information
- Born: March 25, 1994 (age 32) Montreal, Quebec, Canada
- Height: 1.63 m (5 ft 4 in)

Skiing career
- Sport: Alpine skiing
- Disciplines: Moguls, Dual Moguls and Freeride
- World Cup debut: 11 December 2010 (age 16)

Olympics
- Teams: 3 – (2014–2022)
- Medals: 2 (1 gold)

World Championships
- Teams: 5 – (2013–2021)
- Medals: 4 (1 gold)

World Cup
- Seasons: 12 – (2011–2022)
- Wins: 15
- Podiums: 49
- Overall titles: 0 – (3rd in 2014)
- Discipline titles: 0 – (2nd in moguls in 2012, 2013, 2014, 2015, 2016)
Medal record
Women's freestyle skiing
Representing Canada
International freestyle skiing competitions
Event	1st	2nd	3rd
Olympic Games	1	1	0
World Championships	1	1	2
Total	2	2	2
Olympic Games
Gold medal – first place	2014 Sochi	Moguls
Silver medal – second place	2018 Pyeongchang	Moguls
World Championships
Gold medal – first place	2015 Kreischberg	Moguls
Silver medal – second place	2015 Kreischberg	Dual Moguls
Bronze medal – third place	2013 Voss	Moguls
Bronze medal – third place	2017 Sierra Nevada	Moguls

Justine Dufour-Lapointe (born March 25, 1994) is a Canadian freestyle and freeride skier. She was the Olympic champion in the moguls event at the 2014 Winter Olympics and won a silver medal in moguls at the 2018 Winter Olympics. The gold and silver she and her sister Chloe Dufour-Lapointe won in 2014 was the first time that Canadian sisters stood together on the podium, and the fourth time ever by all nations. In winning the Olympics, she became the youngest freestyle skiing Olympic champion ever at nineteen years of age. Dufour-Lapointe was the FIS World Cup rookie of the year for the 2010–11 season. Dufour-Lapointe was the world champion in moguls at the 2015 World Championships has also won a silver and two other bronze medals in the moguls event at the Freestyle World Ski Championships.

She started competing in the Freeride World Tour in 2023, winning the season in her first year of competition and repeating as World Tour champion in 2025.

== Career ==
=== Moguls ===
Justine Dufour-Lapointe started her young career during the 2010–11 FIS Freestyle Skiing World Cup. During that season, she became the youngest female winner of a FIS World Cup moguls event at the age of 16, winning the event in Mont Gabriel. She has two older sisters, Chloe Dufour-Lapointe and Maxime Dufour-Lapointe, who also compete in moguls.

She won her first major medal at the 2013 FIS Freestyle Skiing World Championships, where she placed third, winning the bronze behind the dominant Hannah Kearney, who had won the gold medal. Dufour-Lapointe had fallen during her qualification but managed to place a good second run to qualify for the final. This was a proud result for Dufour-Lapointe; given the adversity required to win the bronze, she stated, "I’m so happy about my medal today, but in fact, it’s not the medal so much as the path that I took to get it. The path was tough, but I made it."

At the 2014 Sochi Olympics, Dufour-Lapointe competed in Moguls along with her sisters Chloé and Maxime. This was the fifth time that three siblings competed at the Winter Games in the same event. Justine finished first overall in the event with a score of 22.44, with her sister Chloé placing second with a score of 21.66. With the result, she became the youngest freestyle skiing champion ever at the Winter Games. Thanks to the win, this earned the sisters' and Canada's first gold and silver medals of the 2014 Sochi Olympics. Dufour-Lapointe said of the event with her sister and her excitement that "Holding Chloe's hand meant that I wasn't alone. I was in shock. I saw Chloe, and I felt calm. Holding her hand, I knew it would feel more like home."

The 2015 FIS World Championships were another event for Dufour-Lapointe to build her elite status. At these championships, she began by first winning the World Championship title in the mogul's event; she said, "My plan was simple. I wanted to find a balance between speed and technique. I stayed calm and focused during the day. I was really in a zone. To get the Olympic gold medal and now the World Championship gold medal is a dream come true. I’ve grown so much since the Olympics and learned a lot. That experience helped me here." She accompanied her gold medal with a silver medal performance in the dual moguls in Kreischberg, Austria.

Dufour-Lapointe went into the 2018 Winter Olympics as an underdog and having trouble finding the podium with her usual regularity. She would qualify for the finals and the third run against five other competitors for the medal. She finished in second place in the final run, just one-tenth of a second away from the gold medal. Dufour-Lapointe noted the distinction between her two Olympics, saying, "I feel so different than I was in Sochi. In Sochi, I was completely a kid, enjoying this life, not knowing what's going on around. But today... I know what to do, to focus on myself, my ski, my line, my moment, and that's all. Because if not, I won't be proud of me."

She was named to Canada's 2022 Olympic team in Beijing. However, the games would end in disappointment for Dufour-Lapointe as she would crash in the final and finished 20th. Her sister Chloe was seen comforting her following the poor result and Dufour-Lapointe would later say that "I was so grateful to have my sister down there. I don't think I would have been able to hold myself like I did. Having people that you can trust that much and look in the eye and truly express how you feel for a couple of minutes was really reassuring and felt like everything was going to be OK."

=== Freeride ===
Dufour-Lapointe switched to freeride skiing during the 2023 season. She won two stops during the 2023 Freeride World Tour at Ordino Arcalís and Fieberbrunn on her way to winning the season title. Dufour-Lapointe skipped the 2024 season for personal reasons, but returned to the Freeride World Tour in 2025, winning the first event and finishing second at Val Thorens, on her way to winning her second World Tour.

== Personal life ==
Dufour-Lapointe studied Cégep distance education in humanities. She is the youngest of three skiing sisters.

== World Cup results ==
All results are sourced from the International Ski Federation (FIS).

=== Season standings ===
Season	Age	Overall	Moguls
2011	16	13	4
2012	17	4	2
2013	18	7	2
2014	19	3	2
2015	20	4	2
2016	21	8	2
2017	23	12	3
2018	24	14	5
2019	25	30	6
2020	26	14	4
2021	27	—N/a	9
2022	28	—N/a	11

=== Race Podiums ===
- 15 wins – (10 MO, 5 DM)
- 49 podiums – (31 MO, 18 DM)

No.	Season	Date	Location	Discipline	Place
1	2010–11	15 December 2010	Méribel, France	Dual Moguls	3rd
2	2010–11	15 January 2011	Mont Gabriel, Canada	Dual Moguls	1st
3	2010–11	12 March 2011	Åre, Sweden	Dual Moguls	2nd
4	2010–11	20 March 2011	Myrkdalen-Voss, Norway	Dual Moguls	3rd
5	2011–12	20 December 2011	Méribel, France	Dual Moguls	2nd
6	2011–12	14 January 2012	Mont Gabriel, Canada	Dual Moguls	2nd
7	2011–12	19 January 2012	(United States) Lake Placid, USA	Moguls	2nd
8	2011–12	28 January 2012	Calgary, Canada	Moguls	2nd
9	2011–12	4 February 2012	(United States) Deer Valley, USA	Dual Moguls	2nd
10	2011–12	12 February 2012	Beida Lake, China	Moguls	2nd
11	2011–12	18 February 2012	Naeba, Japan	Moguls	3rd
12	2011–12	18 March 2012	Megève, France	Dual Moguls	1st
13	2012–13	15 December 2012	Ruka, Finland	Dual Moguls	2nd
14	2012–13	22 December 2012	Kreischberg, Austria	Dual Moguls	3rd
15	2012–13	26 January 2013	Calgary, Canada	Moguls	1st
16	2012–13	2 February 2013	(United States) Deer Valley, USA	Dual Moguls	2nd
17	2013–14	14 December 2013	Ruka, Finland	Moguls	2nd
18	2013–14	4 January 2014	Calgary, Canada	Moguls	1st
19	2013–14	9 January 2014	(United States) Deer Valley, USA	Moguls	3rd
20	2013–14	15 January 2014	(United States) Lake Placid, USA	Moguls	1st
21	2013–14	19 January 2014	Val St. Côme, Canada	Moguls	2nd
22	2013–14	1 March 2014	Inawashiro, Japan	Moguls	1st
23	2013–14	15 March 2014	Voss-Myrkdalen, Norway	Moguls	1st
24	2013–14	16 March 2014	Voss-Myrkdalen, Norway	Dual Moguls	2nd
25	2014–15	3 January 2015	Calgary, Canada	Moguls	3rd
26	2014–15	9 January 2015	(United States) Deer Valley, USA	Moguls	2nd
27	2014–15	10 January 2015	(United States) Deer Valley, USA	Dual Moguls	1st
28	2014–15	29 January 2015	(United States) Lake Placid, USA	Moguls	1st
29	2014–15	15 March 2015	Megève, France	Dual Moguls	3rd
30	2015–16	23 January 2016	Val St. Côme, Canada	Moguls	1st
31	2015–16	30 January 2016	Calgary, Canada	Moguls	2nd
32	2015–16	4 February 2016	(United States) Deer Valley, USA	Moguls	1st
33	2015–16	6 February 2016	(United States) Deer Valley, USA	Dual Moguls	1st
34	2016–17	21 January 2017	Val St. Côme, Canada	Moguls	1st
35	2016–17	28 January 2017	Calgary, Canada	Moguls	2nd
36	2016–17	2 February 2017	(United States) Deer Valley, USA	Moguls	2nd
37	2016–17	11 February 2017	Pyeongchang, South Korea	Moguls	2nd
38	2016–17	25 February 2017	Thaiwoo, China	Moguls	2nd
39	2016–17	26 February 2017	Thaiwoo, China	Dual Moguls	3rd
40	2017–18	6 January 2018	Calgary, Canada	Moguls	3rd
41	2017–18	20 January 2018	Mont-Tremblant, Canada	Moguls	1st
42	2017–18	3 March 2018	Tazawako, Japan	Moguls	2nd
43	2017–18	18 March 2018	Megève, France	Dual Moguls	3rd
44	2018–19	26 January 2019	Mont-Tremblant, Canada	Moguls	3rd
45	2018–19	2 March 2019	Shymbulak, Kazakhstan	Moguls	3rd
46	2019–20	14 December 2019	Thaiwoo, China	Moguls	3rd
47	2019–20	1 February 2020	Calgary, Canada	Moguls	3rd
48	2019–20	6 February 2020	(United States) Deer Valley, USA	Moguls	3rd
49	2019–20	8 February 2020	(United States) Deer Valley, USA	Dual Moguls	1st

== Olympic results ==
- 2 medals – (1 gold, 1 silver)

Year	Age	Moguls
(Russia) 2014 Sochi	19	1
(South Korea) 2018 Pyeongchang	23	2
(China) 2022 Beijing	27	20

== World Championships results ==
- 4 medals – (1 gold, 1 silver, 2 bronze)

Year	Age	Moguls	Dual Moguls
(Norway) 2013 Voss	18	3	15
(Austria) 2015 Kreischberg	20	1	2
(Spain) 2017 Sierra Nevada	22	3	14
(United States) 2019 Deer Valley	24	5	12
(Kazakhstan) 2021 Almaty	26	12	9

== See also ==
- List of Olympic medalist families
