= Tetiana Petrova =

Ukrainian freestyle skier

Personal information
- Full name: Тетяна Петрова
- Nationality: Ukraine
- Born: 5 June 1993 (age 33)

Sport
- Sport: Skiing

Tetiana Petrova (born 5 June 1993) is a Ukrainian freestyle skier, specializing in moguls. She competed for Ukraine at the 2018 Winter Olympics in the women's moguls event.

== Career ==
Petrova began competing in February 2014 winning national championships in Slovenia. Next year she debuted at World Championships in Kreischberg, Austria, where she was 33rd in moguls and 31st in dual moguls. Later she took a pause and returned at 2017 Winter Universiade in Almaty, Kazakhstan, where she finished 5th in both moguls and dual moguls. At 2017 World Championships in Spain's Sierra Nevada she was 29th in moguls and 27th in dual moguls. On December 9, 2017, she debuted at FIS Freestyle Skiing World Cup in Finnish Ruka where she finished 41st. As of February 2018, her best World Cup finish is 40th.

After Petrova finished her competitive career, she became moguls coach for the national team of Ukraine.

== Career results ==
=== Winter Olympics ===
Year	Place	Moguls
2018	Pyeongchang, South Korea	30

=== World Championships ===
Year	Place	MO	DM
2015	Kreischberg, Austria	33	31
2017	Sierra Nevada, Spain	29	27
