= Andi Naude =

Canadian freestyle skier (born 1996)

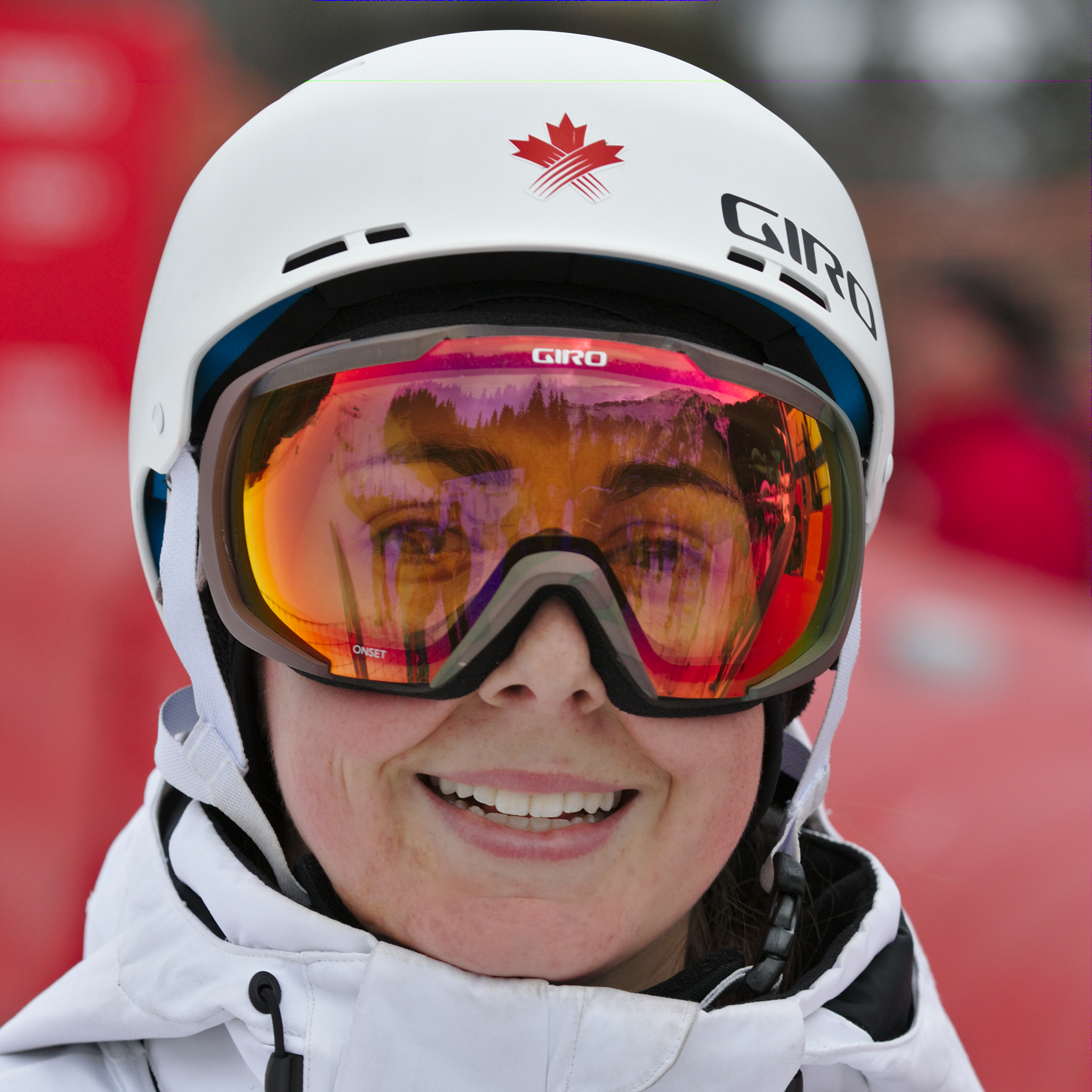
- Naude at the 2015 FIS Moguls World Cup Finals in Megève

Personal information
- Born: January 10, 1996 (age 30) Regina, Saskatchewan
- Height: 1.64 m (5 ft 5 in)
- Weight: 62 kg (137 lb)

Sport
- Country: Canada
- Sport: Freestyle skiing

Andi Naude (born January 10, 1996) is a Canadian freestyle skier. She competed at the 2018 Winter Olympics for Canada in moguls.

== Personal life ==
Naude was born in Regina, Saskatchewan but grew up in Penticton, British Columbia skiing at Apex Mountain Resort.

== World Cup results ==
All results are sourced from the International Ski Federation (FIS).

=== Season standings ===
Season	Starts	Age	Overall	Moguls
2011–12	1	16	—	—
2012–13	12	17	56	14
2013–14	11	18	44	7
2014–15	9	19	19	5
2015–16	8	20	25	5
2016–17	11	21	18	4

=== Race Podiums ===
- 10 podiums – (8 MO, 2 DM)

Season	Date	Location	Discipline	Place
2014–15	January 29, 2015	Lake Placid, United States	Moguls	3rd
2015–16	January 30, 2016	Calgary, Canada	Moguls	3rd
2015–16	March 5, 2016	Moscow, Russia	Dual Moguls	2nd
2016–17	January 21, 2017	Val St-Come, Canada	Moguls	2nd
2016–17	February 4, 2017	(United States) Deer Valley, Canada	Dual Moguls	2nd
2016–17	February 11, 2017	Pyeongchang, South Korea	Moguls	3rd
2016–17	February 18, 2017	Tazawako, Japan	Moguls	3rd
2017–18	December 21, 2017	Thaiwoo, China	Moguls	3rd
2017–18	December 22, 2017	Thaiwoo, China	Moguls	3rd
2017–18	January 20, 2018	Tremblant, Canada	Moguls	2nd

== World Championships results ==
Year	Age	Moguls	Dual Moguls
(Norway) 2013 Voss	17	12	7
(Austria) 2015 Kreischberg	19	34	12
(Spain) 2017 Sierra Nevada	21	13	9
