= Perrine Laffont =

French freestyle skier (born 1998)

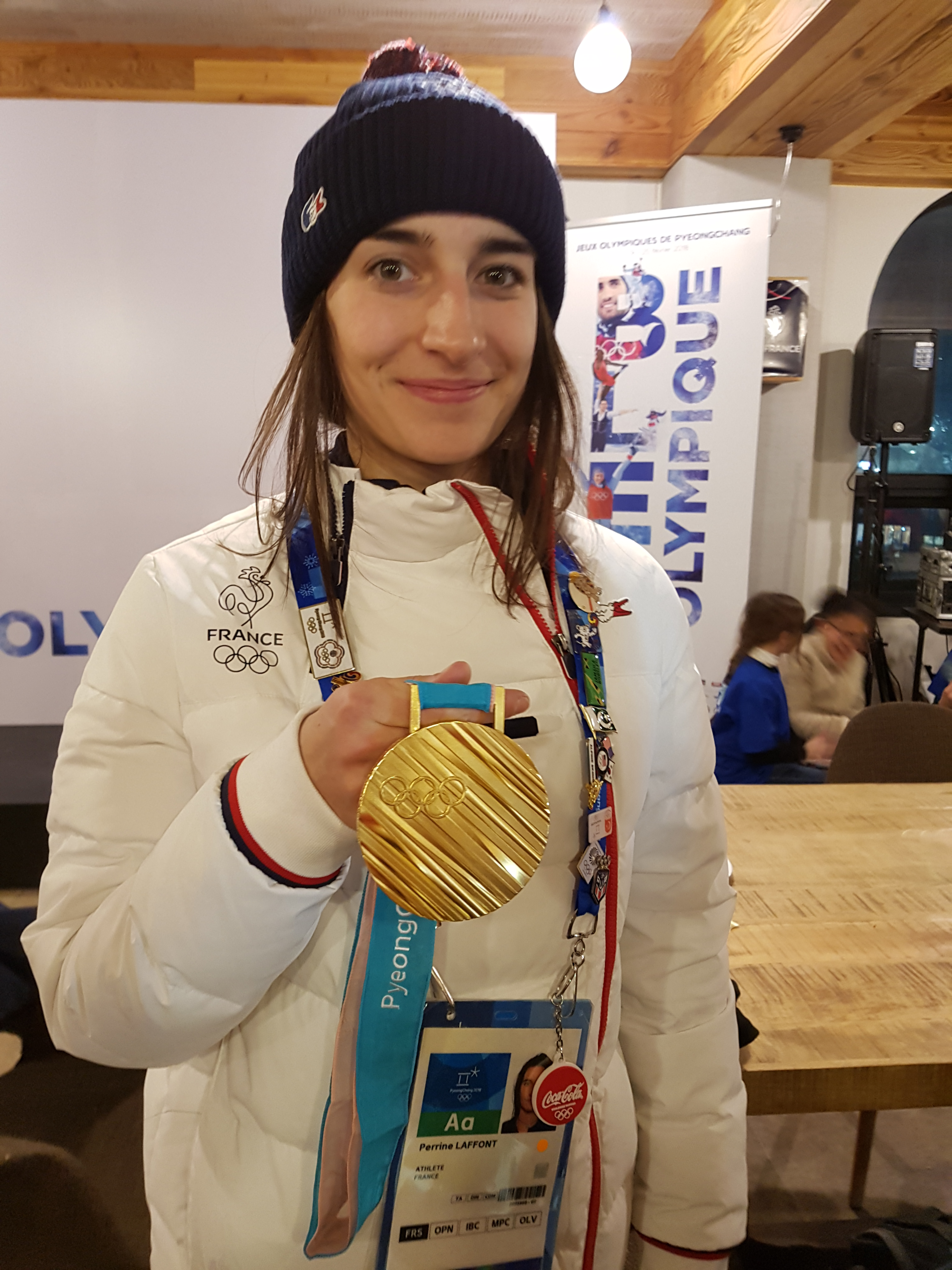
- Perrine Laffont at the 2018 Olympics

Personal information
- Born: 28 October 1998 (age 27) Lavelanet, France
- Height: 1.64 m (5 ft 5 in)

Skiing career
- Sport: Alpine skiing
- Club: Boss Club des Monts d'Olmes
- Disciplines: Moguls, dual moguls
- World Cup debut: 4 January 2014

Olympics
- Teams: 3 – (2014–2022)
- Medals: 2 (1 gold)

World Championships
- Teams: 6 – (2015–2025)
- Medals: 8 (6 gold)

World Cup
- Wins: 24
- Podiums: 40
- Overall titles: 79
Medal record
Women's freestyle skiing
Representing France
Olympic Games
Gold medal – first place	2018 Pyeongchang	Moguls
Bronze medal – third place	2026 Milano Cortina	Moguls
World Championships
Gold medal – first place	2017 Sierra Nevada	Dual moguls
Gold medal – first place	2019 Utah	Dual moguls
Gold medal – first place	2021 Almaty	Moguls
Gold medal – first place	2023 Bakuriani	Moguls
Gold medal – first place	2023 Bakuriani	Dual moguls
Gold medal – first place	2025 St. Moritz	Moguls
Silver medal – second place	2017 Sierra Nevada	Moguls
Bronze medal – third place	2019 Utah	Moguls

Perrine Laffont (French pronunciation: [peʁin lafɔ̃]; born 28 October 1998) is a French mogul skier. She is the 2018 Olympic Champion and a six times World Champion.

== Career ==
She won the gold medal at the 2018 Winter Olympic Games in the moguls event, and was back-to-back overall winner of the FIS Freestyle Ski World Cup in the 2018–19 and 2019–20 seasons.

On 8 March 2021, Laffont won the single mogul skiing event at the world championships on the Almaty piste in Kazakhstan.

On 11 February 2026, Laffont won the bronze medal in moguls at the 2026 Winter Olympics in Valtellina.

== Results ==
=== Olympics ===
- 2 medals – (1 gold, 1 bronze)

Year	Age	Moguls	Dual Moguls
(Russia) 2014 Sochi	15	14	—N/a
(South Korea) 2018 Pyeongchang	19	1	—N/a
(China) 2022 Beijing	23	4	—N/a
(Italy) 2026 Milano Cortina	27	3	4

=== World Championships ===
- 8 medals – (6 gold, 1 silver and 1 bronze)

Year	Age	Moguls	Dual Moguls
(Austria) 2015 Kreischberg	16	13	6
(Spain) 2017 Sierra Nevada	18	2	1
(United States) 2019 Utah	20	3	1
(Kazakhstan) 2021 Almaty	22	1	7
(Georgia (country)) 2023 Bakuriani	24	1	1
(Switzerland) 2025 St. Moritz	26	1	5

=== Junior World Championships ===
- 5 medals – (3 gold and 2 bronze)

Year	Age	Moguls	Dual Moguls
(Italy) 2013 Chiesa in Valmalenco	14	5	3
(Italy) 2014 Chiesa in Valmalenco	15	3	4
(Italy) 2015 Chiesa in Valmalenco	16	1	1
(Sweden) 2016 Åre	17	1	DNS

=== Season standings ===
Season	Age	Overall	Overall Moguls	Moguls	Dual Moguls
2014	16	88	19	—N/a	
2015	17	61	16	—N/a	
2016	18	11	3rd place, bronze medalist(s)	—N/a	
2017	19	9	2nd place, silver medalist(s)	—N/a	
2018	20	4	1st place, gold medalist(s)	—N/a	
2019	21	1st place, gold medalist(s)	1st place, gold medalist(s)	—N/a	
2020	22	1st place, gold medalist(s)	1st place, gold medalist(s)	—N/a	
2021	23	—N/a	1st place, gold medalist(s)	—N/a	
2022	24	—N/a	2nd place, silver medalist(s)	1st place, gold medalist(s)	2nd place, silver medalist(s)
2023	25	—N/a	1st place, gold medalist(s)	2nd place, silver medalist(s)	1st place, gold medalist(s)
2025	27	—N/a	2nd place, silver medalist(s)	2nd place, silver medalist(s)	2nd place, silver medalist(s)
