= Tess Johnson =

American freestyle skier (born 2000)

Personal information
- Born: June 19, 2000 (age 26) Vail, United States
- Height: 5 ft 4 in (163 cm)
- Weight: 117 lb (53 kg)

Sport
- Country: United States
- Sport: Freestyle skiing
- Event: Dual moguls
- Club: Ski and Snowboard Club Vail
Medal record
Women's freestyle skiing
Representing the United States
World Championships
Silver medal – second place	2025 Engadin	Dual moguls
Bronze medal – third place	2019 Utah	Dual moguls

Tess Johnson (born June 19, 2000) is an American freestyle moguls skier. In 2014, she became the youngest moguls skier ever named to the United States national team. She represented the United States at the 2018 and 2026 Winter Olympics.

== Early life and education ==
Tess Johnson was born in Vail, Colorado to TJ and Carol Johnson. She is the granddaughter of William Oscar Johnson, a writer who covered the Olympics and ski racing for Sports Illustrated. Tess began skiing with her parents at age two. She played soccer for Vail Mountain School, which won state championships in 2015 and 2016.

== Career ==
At fourteen years old, Johnson became the youngest ever moguls skier named to the United States national team. In the 2014–15 season, she had five top-10 finishes on the NorAm tour. In 2016, she won the Grand Prix title for the NorAm tour. and a silver medal at the FIS Junior World Ski Championships.

In January 2018, Johnson placed fourth at a World Cup event in Tremblant, Quebec. The result was the best of any American competing at the event and Johnson's best World Cup finish to date. On January 22, 2018, Johnson was named to the United States Olympic Team for the 2018 Winter Olympics in Pyeongchang. At the Olympics, Johnson placed seventeenth in the first round of qualifying. She is coached by former Nordic skier Sylvan Ellefson as well as Riley Campbell and John Dowling.

Competing at the 2026 Winter Olympics in Valtellina, she finished in 9th place in the first qualification round of the moguls with a score of 73.79 on February 10, 2026, qualifying her for the final.

== Results ==
=== Olympic Winter Games ===
Year	Age	Moguls	Dual Moguls
(South Korea) 2018 Pyeongchang	21	12	—N/a
(Italy) 2026 Milano Cortina	25	10	5

=== World Championships ===
Year	Age	Moguls	Dual Moguls
(United States) 2019 Deer Valley	19	12	3
(Kazakhstan) 2021 Almaty	21	11	5
(Switzerland) 2025 Engadin	25	12	2

==== Season standings ====
Season	Age	Overall Moguls	Moguls	Dual Moguls
2016	16	41	—N/a	
2017	17	13	—N/a	
2018	18	7	—N/a	
2019	19	5	—N/a	
2020	20	10	—N/a	
2021	21	6	—N/a	
2022	22	5	5	7
2023	23	12	11	13
2024	24	7	8	7
2025	25	3rd place, bronze medalist(s)	4	5
