= Waterville Valley BBTS =

Ski and snowboard club

The Waterville Valley BBTS Ski Educational Foundation is a ski and snowboard club based out of Waterville Valley, New Hampshire, United States.

The ski club was founded in the 1930s, before the Waterville Valley Resort ski area was opened. BBTS, an acronym for Black and Blue Trail Smashers, was a common name among the skiers cutting their first trails along Mount Tecumseh.
