= Leonie Gerken Schofield =

British freestyle skier

Personal information
- Nationality: United Kingdom
- Born: 15 February 1998 (age 28) Chelmsford, United Kingdom

Sport
- Sport: Freestyle skiing
- Club: GB Snowsports
Medal record
Women's freestyle skiing
Representing Great Britain
Junior World Championships
Silver medal – second place	2013 Chiesa in Valmalenco	Moguls

Leonie Gerken Schofield (born 15 February 1998) is a British freestyle skier athlete. She competed in the 2022 Winter Olympics.

== Career ==
Leonie Gerken Schofield won a silver medal at the 2013 FIS Freestyle Junior World Ski Championships in the moguls event, held in Chiesa in Valmalenco. At the women's moguls event, she finished 17th out of 20 competitors in the second qualifying round, failing to qualify for the finals.

== Personal life ==
Leonie Gerken Schofield has a twin brother, Thomas, and a younger sister Makayla, both of whom are also freestyle skiers. The siblings grew up in Essex, England, before moving to France at a young age. She dedicated her Olympic runs to her grandfather, who died before the 2022 Olympics.
