= Morgan Schild =

American freestyle mogul skier (born 1997)

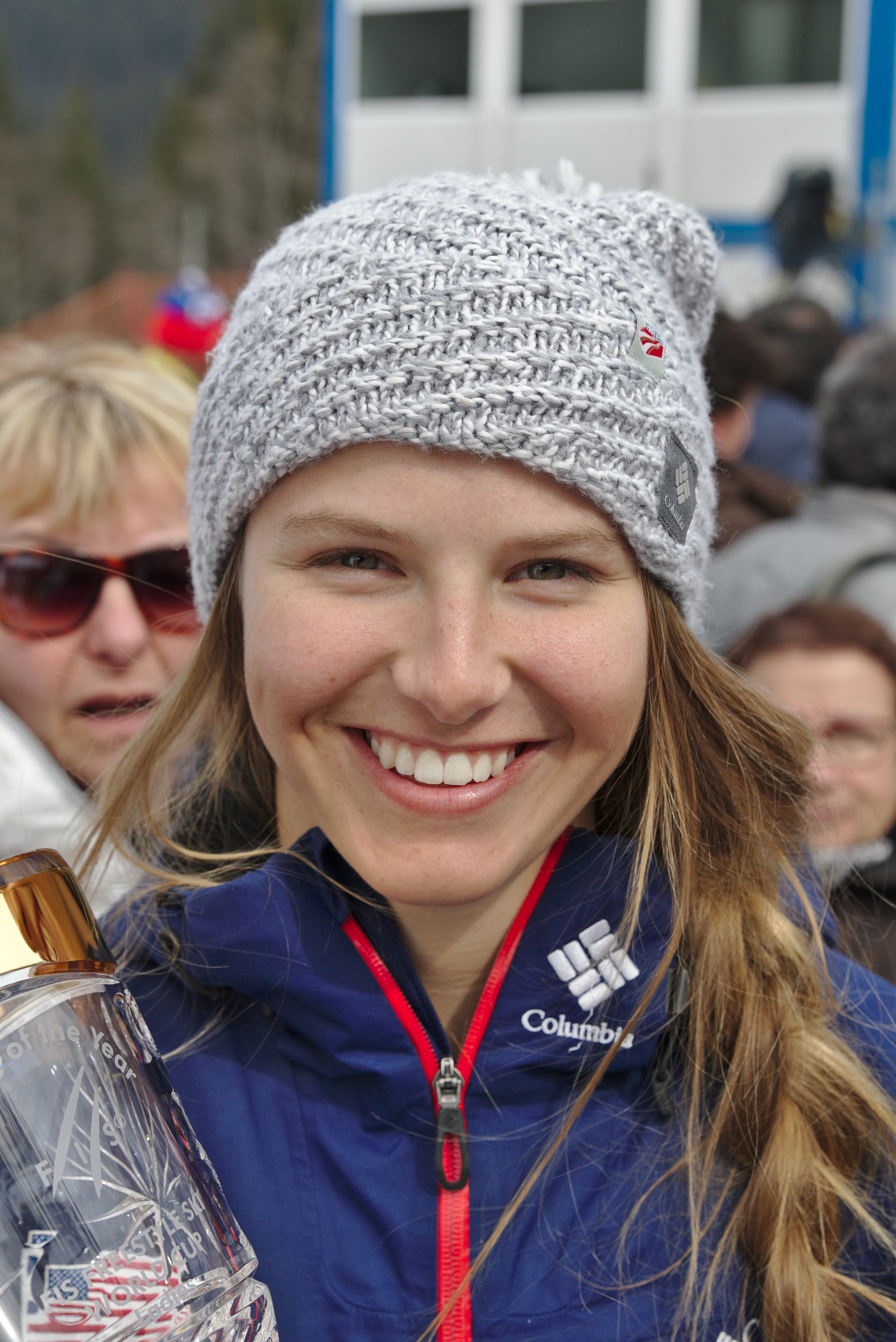
- Schild in 2015

Personal information
- Born: August 25, 1997 (age 28) Rochester, New York
- Height: 5 ft 7 in (170 cm)

Sport
- Sport: Skiing

Morgan Schild (born August 25, 1997) is an American freestyle mogul skier. She competed for the United States Olympic team at the 2018 Winter Olympics in Pyeongchang.

== Early life and education ==
Schild was born August 25, 1997, in Rochester, New York, to Robert, known as "Buzz," and Lorraine, a nurse practitioner. She was raised in Pittsford, New York. Schild was athletic as a child. She began skiing at age five. Alongside freestyle skiing, she also skied cross-country, and played soccer and softball. Schild was inspired to ski competitively after watching Hannah Kearney win a gold medal at the 2010 Winter Olympics. At age 15, Schild began dividing her time and training between Bristol Mountain, New York and Vail, Colorado. Schild has attended Pittsford Sutherland and Westminster College.

== Career ==
Schild is a freestyle mogul skier. In 2014, Schild was the overall NorAm Tour Winner and won silver medal at the Junior World Championships. The following year, she was named Rookie of the Year for the FIS World Cup. At the 2015 Junior World Championships, Schild tore her ACL and injured her shoulder. The injuries prevented her from competing for two years.

Schild made her comeback to competition in January 2017, placing third in moguls at her first competition back. That March Schild won the United States national championship in moguls. In January 2018, Schild placed third in two events at the FIS Visa International World Cup, securing her spot on the United States Olympic team for the 2018 Winter Olympics in Pyeongchang. At the Olympics, Schild was in third place after the first round of qualifications, allowing her to automatically advance to the first round of finals. Schild was the top American qualifier.

Schild is coached by John Kroetz. Her nickname in competitions is “Warpaint” for her concentration in competition.
