= Hannah Kearney =

American freestyle skier

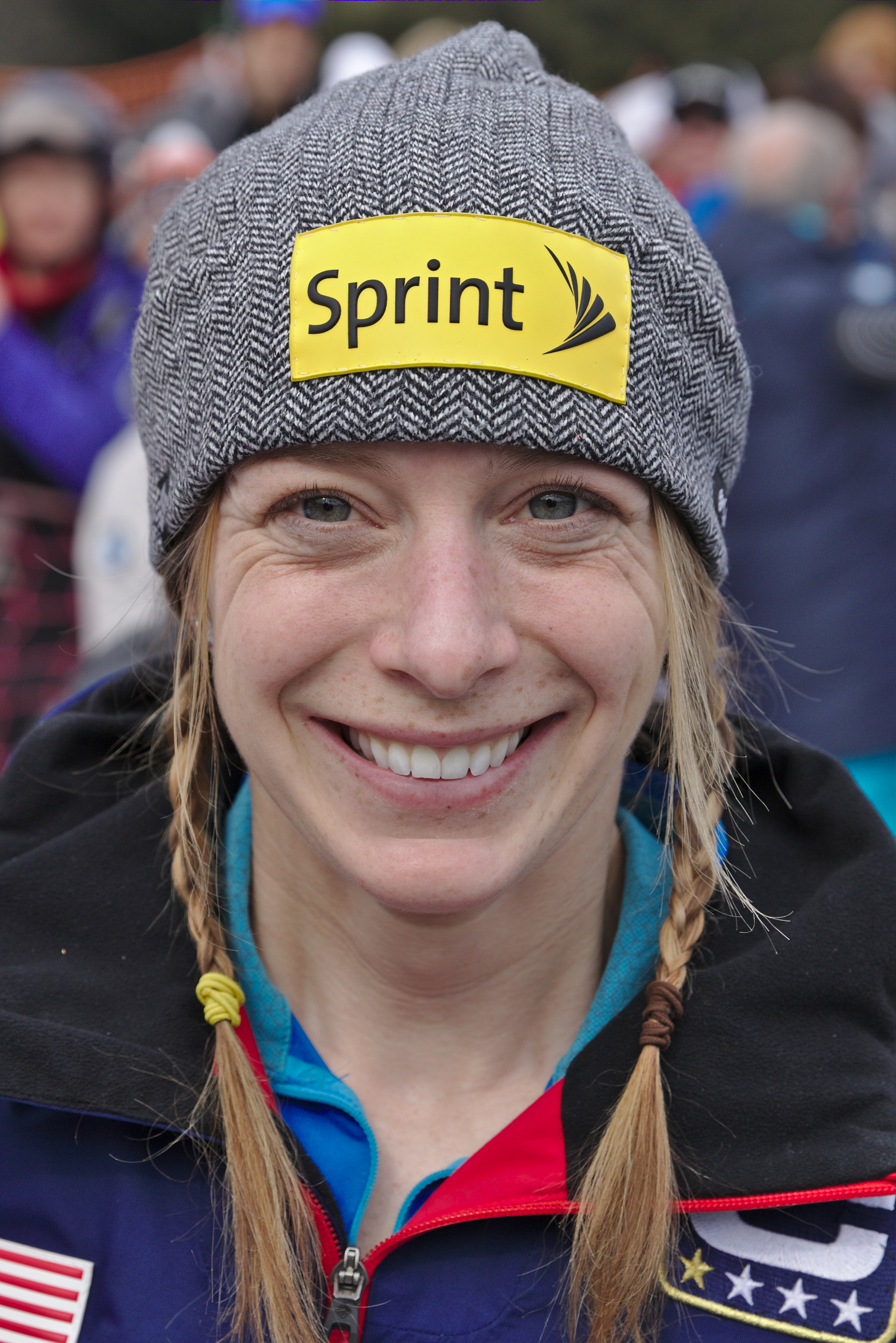
- Kearney in March 2015

Personal information
- Born: February 26, 1986 (age 40) Hanover, New Hampshire, U.S.
- Height: 5 ft 6 in (168 cm)

Skiing career
- Country: United States
- Sport: Alpine skiing
- Club: Waterville Valley BBTS
- Disciplines: Moguls, Dual Moguls
- World Cup debut: January 11, 2003 (age 16)

Olympics
- Teams: 3 (2006, 2010, 2014)
- Medals: 2 (1 gold)

World Championships
- Teams: 4
- Medals: 6 (2 gold)

World Cup
- Seasons: 10
- Wins: 46
- Podiums: 71
- Overall titles: 4 (2011, 2012, 2014, 2015)
- Discipline titles: 6 moguls (2009, 2011, 2012, 2013, 2014, 2015)
Medal record
Women's freestyle skiing
Representing the United States
Olympic Games
Gold medal – first place	2010 Vancouver	Moguls
Bronze medal – third place	2014 Sochi	Moguls
World Championships
Gold medal – first place	2005 Ruka	Moguls
Gold medal – first place	2013 Voss	Moguls
Gold medal – first place	2015 Kreischberg	Dual moguls
Silver medal – second place	2011 Deer Valley	Moguls
Silver medal – second place	2015 Kreischberg	Moguls
Bronze medal – third place	2009 Inawashiro	Dual moguls
Bronze medal – third place	2011 Deer Valley	Dual moguls
Bronze medal – third place	2013 Voss	Dual moguls

Hannah Angela Kearney (born February 26, 1986) is an American mogul skier who won a gold medal at the 2010 Winter Olympics and a bronze medal at the 2014 Winter Olympics.

== Early life, family and education ==
Kearney was born in Dartmouth-Hitchcock Medical Center in Hanover, New Hampshire, to Jill (née Gass) and Tom Kearney. They met while attending McGill University in Montreal, Quebec, Canada. She was raised in Norwich, Vermont (and continues to live there). Her mother is active in promoting youth sports as the director of the Town of Norwich Recreation Department. Hannah began skiing at age two. She considers herself "half-Canadian" because her mother grew up in Montreal and she has relatives living in Vancouver and Montreal.

Kearney skied for Waterville Valley BBTS and graduated from Hanover High School. She studied at Dartmouth College as a member of the class of 2015.

== Career ==
Kearney was the national junior moguls champion in 2002. She made her first World Cup appearance on January 11, 2003, finishing 26th.

=== 2006 Winter Olympics ===
A gold medal favorite entering her first Olympics, Kearney had a poor first run and did not make it out of the qualification round. She stumbled after landing her first jump. Her score of 20.80 points put her in 10th at that point, with 20 skiers left to compete. After the second-to-last skier, she was officially bumped out of the top 20, the ranking she would have needed to advance to the final, placing 22nd.

=== 2010 Winter Olympics ===
In December 2009, Kearney won the US Olympic trial event at Steamboat, earning a spot on the US Team.

At the 2010 Winter Olympics, Kearney entered the final round with a qualification score of 25.96. As a result of having the best qualifying score, Kearney would be the last skier to ski in the final round. Fellow teammate Shannon Bahrke was in second place, and Canadian Jennifer Heil was in first, with scores of 25.43 and 25.69 respectively. Kearney skied a clean run, earning a score of 26.63 and winning the gold medal.

=== 2014 Winter Olympics ===
At the 2014 Winter Olympics, Kearney entered the final round with a qualification score of 21.93 As a result of having the best qualifying score, Kearney would be the last skier to ski in the final round. Kearney faltered slightly after the first jump, earning a score of 21.49 to win the bronze medal.

== World Cup results ==
=== Season titles ===
10 titles (4 overall freestyle, 6 moguls)

Season	Discipline
2009	Moguls
2011	Overall
2011	Moguls
2012	Overall
2012	Moguls
2013	Moguls
2014	Overall
2014	Moguls
2015	Overall
2015	Moguls

== Personal life ==
In her free time, Kearney enjoys riding horses, knitting, playing soccer, reading, and watching her brother Denny play hockey.
