= Léa Bouard =

German freestyle skier (born 1996)

Lea Bouard
Personal information
- Born: 7 June 1996 (age 30) Weinheim, Germany
- Height: 1.65 m (5 ft 5 in)
- Weight: 52 kg (115 lb)

Sport
- Country: Germany
- Sport: Freestyle skiing
Medal record
Winter Universiade
Gold medal – first place	2019 Krasnoyarsk	Dual moguls
Silver medal – second place	2019 Krasnoyarsk	Moguls

Lea Bouard (born 7 June 1996) is a German freestyle skier. She competed in the 2018 Winter Olympics in the moguls event.

In June 2016 she switched nationality and began competing for Germany. She represented France at 2015 and 2016 Junior World Ski Championships, winning 2 bronze and a silver medal.

== Personal ==
She was born in Germany to a German mother and a French father.
