= Maxime Dufour-Lapointe =

Canadian freestyle skier (born 1989)

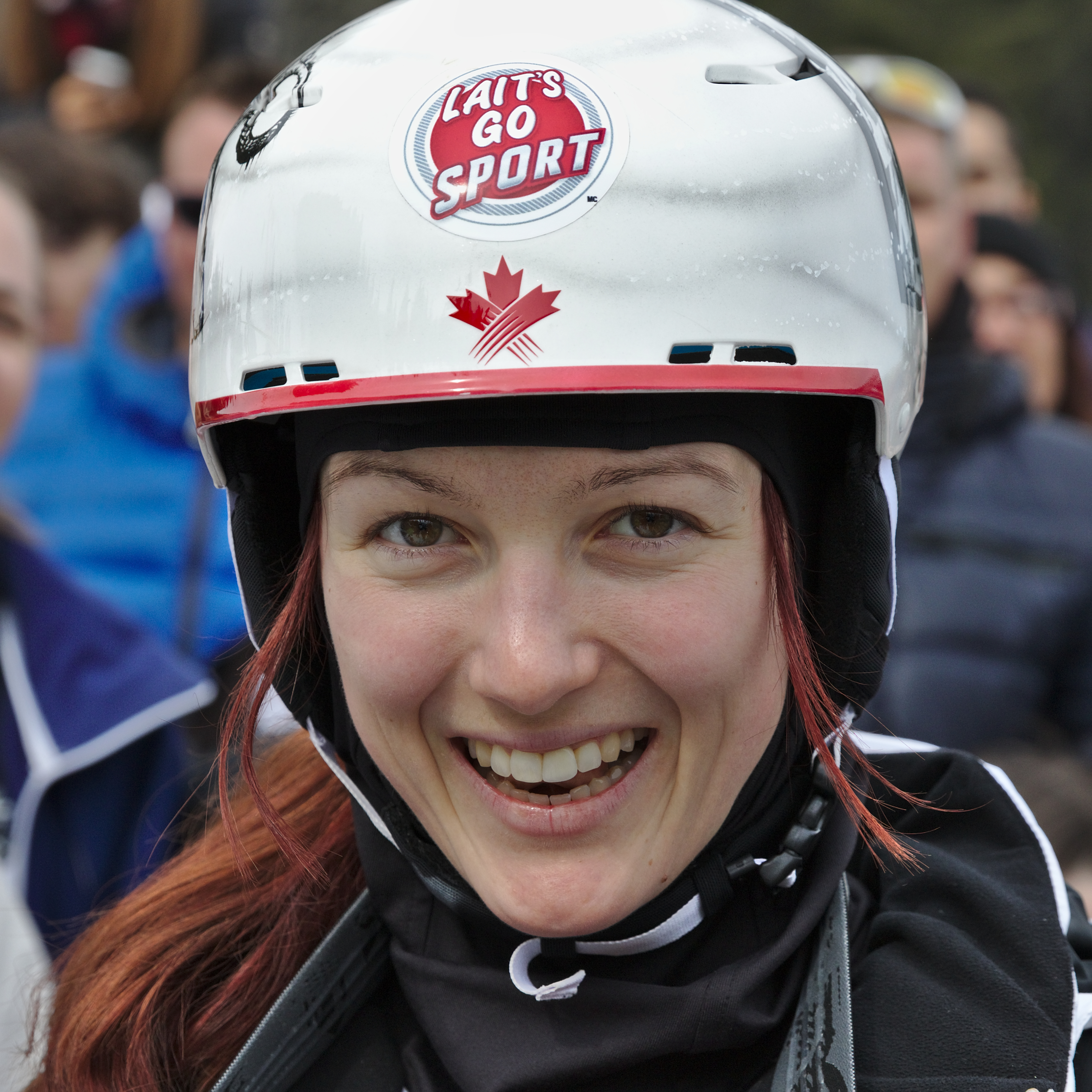
- Maxime Dufour-Lapointe in 2015

Personal information
- Born: February 9, 1989 (age 36) Montréal, Quebec
- Height: 1.67 m (5 ft 6 in)
- Weight: 63 kg (139 lb)

Sport
- Country: Canada
- Sport: Freestyle skiing

Maxime Dufour-Lapointe (born February 9, 1989) is a Canadian freestyle skier from Montréal, Quebec.

She competed at the 2014 Winter Olympics for Canada in moguls. Dufour-Lapointe is the oldest of three sisters to compete at the Winter Olympics with her younger sisters Chloé Dufour-Lapointe and Justine Dufour-Lapointe both being world champion medalists and Olympic medalists. This was the fifth time that three siblings have competed at the same event at the Winter Games.

== Personal life ==
Dufour-Lapointe took eight years to obtain her CEGEP diploma while skiing competitively, before retiring in 2018, then began studying medicine at the University of Montreal. Her residency at Charles-Le Moyne Hospital on Montreal's South Shore begins July 1, 2023.
