= Katharina Förster =

German freestyle skier (born 1988)

Personal information
- Born: 6 November 1988 (age 37)
- Height: 1.64 m (5 ft 5 in)

Sport
- Country: Germany
- Sport: Freestyle skiing

Katharina Förster (born 6 November 1988) is a German freestyle skier. She competed in the 2018 Winter Olympics in the moguls event.
