= Schönberg-Lachtal =

- Former municipality
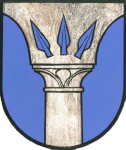
- Coat of arms

- Location within Austria
- Coordinates: 47°11′00″N 14°21′00″E
- Country: Austria
- State: Styria
- District: Murau

Area
  - Total: 42.03 km^{2} (16.23 sq mi)
- Elevation: 1,038 m (3,406 ft)

Population (1 January 2016)
  - Total: 429
  - Density: 10.2/km^{2} (26.4/sq mi)
- Time zone: UTC+1 (CET)
  - Summer (DST): UTC+2 (CEST)
- Postal code: 8831
- Area code: 03587
- Vehicle registration: MU
- Website: www.schoenberg-lachtal.steiermark.at

Schönberg-Lachtal is a former municipality in the district of Murau in the Austrian state of Styria. Since the 2015 Styria municipal structural reform, it is part of the municipality Oberwölz.

== Geography ==
The municipality lies about 16 km northeast of Murau in the Wölz Tauern.
