= Wang Jin (skier) =

Chinese freestyle skier

Personal information
- Born: 19 February 1997 (age 28)
- Height: 1.67 m (5 ft 6 in)

Sport
- Country: China
- Sport: Freestyle skiing

Wang Jin (Chinese: 王金; pinyin: Wáng Jīn; Mandarin pronunciation: [wǎŋ tɕín]; born 19 February 1997) is a Chinese freestyle skier. She competed in the 2018 Winter Olympics, in the moguls event.
