= Guan Ziyan =

Chinese freestyle skier

Personal information
- Born: 16 November 2000 (age 25)
- Height: 1.66 m (5 ft 5 in)

Sport
- Country: China
- Sport: Freestyle skiing

Guan Ziyan
- Simplified Chinese: 关子妍
- Traditional Chinese: 關子妍
Transcriptions
Standard Mandarin
- Hanyu Pinyin: Guān Zǐyán
- IPA: [kwán tsɹ̩̀ jɛ̌n]

Guan Ziyan (Chinese: 关子妍; pinyin: Guān Zǐyán; Mandarin pronunciation: [kwán tsɹ̩̀ jɛ̌n]; born 16 November 2000) is a Chinese freestyle skier. She competed in the 2018 Winter Olympics, in the moguls event.
