= Keaton McCargo =

American freestyle skier (born 1995)

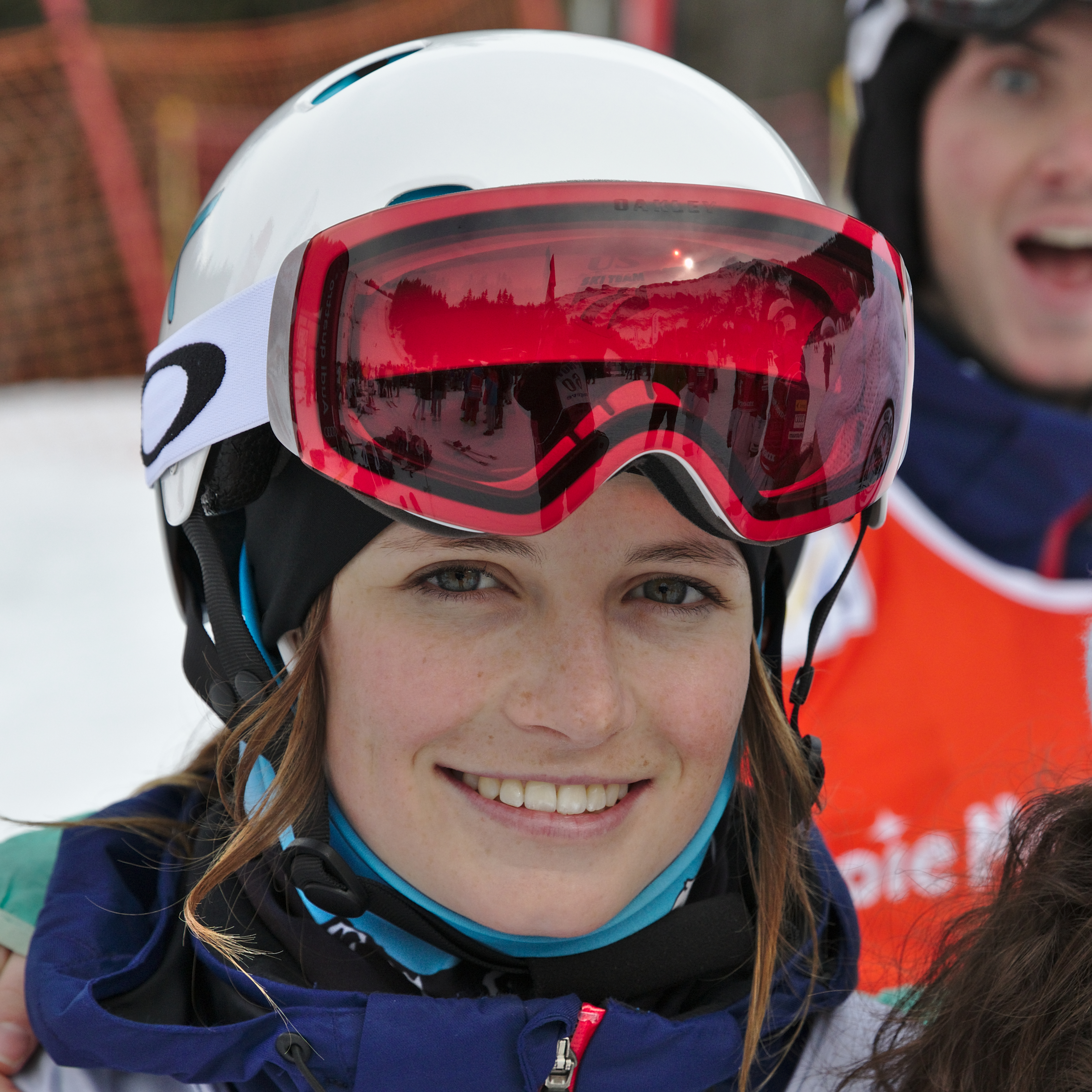

Personal information
- Nationality: United States
- Born: 10 July 1995 (age 31) Telluride, Colorado, U.S.

Sport
- Sport: Skiing

Keaton McCargo (born July 10, 1995) is an American freestyle skier. She has been selected to compete in moguls for the United States at the 2018 Winter Olympics in Pyeongchang.

== Early life and education ==
Keaton McCargo is from Telluride, Colorado. She has two sisters. McCargo graduated from Telluride Mountain School has attended university of Colorado boulder, Environmental Design.

== Career ==
McCargo is a two time gold medalist at the FIS Junior World Championships, winning in 2013 and 2014. McCargo placed third in moguls at the U.S. Championships in 2015. The following year, she won the U.S. Championships. At the end of the 2017 season, McCargo was ranked sixth in moguls in the world. In 2018, McCargo was chosen to compete for the United States in moguls at the 2018 Winter Olympics in Pyeongchang. Leading into the Olympics, McCargo is ranked eighth in World Cup standings.
