= Laura Grasemann =

German freestyle skier (born 1992)

Personal information
- Born: 30 April 1992 (age 34) Heidelberg, Germany

Sport
- Sport: Skiing

Laura Grasemann (born 30 April 1992 in Heidelberg) is a German freestyle skier, specializing in moguls.

Grasemann competed at the 2014 Winter Olympics for Germany. She placed 26th in the first qualifying round in the moguls, failing to advance. In the second qualifying round, she placed 12th, again not advancing.

As of September 2015, her best showing at the World Championships is 9th, in the 2015 moguls.

Grasemann made her World Cup debut in December 2008. As of September 2015, her best World Cup finish is 12th, in a pair of moguls events. Her best World Cup overall finish is 24th, in 2014–15.
