= Marika Pertakhiya =

Russian freestyle skier

Personal information
- Full name: Марика Автандиловна Пертахия
- Born: 15 December 1992 (age 33) Gali, Georgia

Sport
- Sport: Skiing
Medal record
Winter Universiade
Silver medal – second place	2015 Granada	Moguls

Marika Pertakhiya (Russian: Марика Автандиловна Пертахия; born 15 December 1992) is a Russian freestyle skier. She competed at the 2014 Winter Olympics in Sochi, where she qualified for the moguls finals.
