= Yuliya Galysheva =

Kazakhstani freestyle skier (born 1992)

Yulia Galysheva
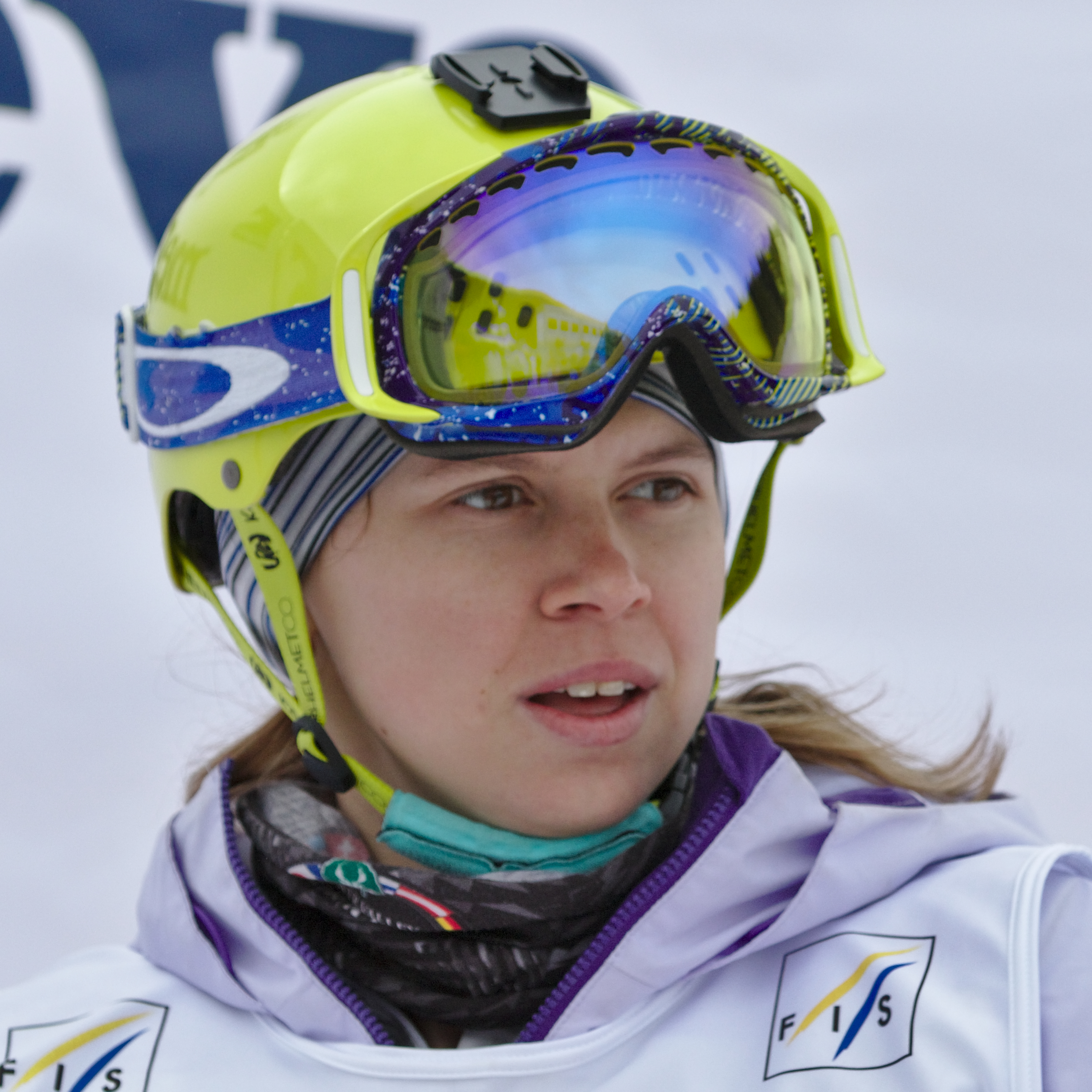
- Galysheva in 2015

Personal information
- Native name: Юлия Евгеньевна Галышева
- Full name: Yulia Evgenievna Galysheva
- Nickname: Yulka
- Nationality: Kazakhstani
- Born: 23 October 1992 (age 33) Oskemen, Kazakhstan
- Height: 1.67 m (5 ft 6 in)

Sport
- Sport: Skiing
- Club: Dynamo

World Cup career
- Seasons: 2010–
- Indiv. podiums: 16
- Indiv. wins: 4
Medal record
Women's freestyle skiing
Representing Kazakhstan
Olympic Games
Bronze medal – third place	2018 Pyeongchang	Moguls
World Championships
Gold medal – first place	2019 Utah	Moguls
Silver medal – second place	2017 Sierra Nevada	Dual Moguls
Silver medal – second place	2021 Almaty	Moguls
Bronze medal – third place	2015 Kreischberg	Dual Moguls
Asian Winter Games
Gold medal – first place	2011 Astana-Almaty	Moguls
Gold medal – first place	2011 Astana-Almaty	Dual moguls
Silver medal – second place	2017 Sapporo	Moguls
Gold medal – first place	2017 Sapporo	Dual moguls
Winter Universiade
Gold medal – first place	2015 Granada	Moguls
Gold medal – first place	2017 Almaty	Moguls
Gold medal – first place	2017 Almaty	Dual moguls

Yulia Evgenievna Galysheva (Russian: Юлия Евгеньевна Галышева, born 23 October 1992) is a Kazakhstani mogul skier who won three medals at FIS Freestyle Ski World Championships, bronze medal at the 2018 Pyeongchang Olympic Games and two gold medals at the Asian Winter Games in 2011.

== Athletic career ==
Yulia Galysheva has competed at international challenges since March 2006. She debuted at the Europa Cup stage in the Russian Saint-Petersburg. She was 21st in mogul and 18th in dual moguls. In 2007, she competed in FIS Freestyle World Ski Championship at the Madonna di Campiglio, where she finished 22nd in moguls and 21st in dual moguls.

In February 2008, she placed second in the German Schliersee at the Europa cup's dual mogul. A few days later, she won two gold medals in moguls and dual moguls at the Swiss Engelberg. In 2010, she competed at the Winter Olympics in Vancouver, where she finished 11th in moguls. Galysheva got her first World Cup victory at the Meribel and was ahead of Hannah Kearney in the final of dual moguls. In 2011, she won gold medals at the 2011 Asian Winter Games in moguls and dual moguls. In 2011, she also won in the Europa cup stage in Jyväskylä. Next year, she became juniors World champion in moguls.

Also, she won a silver medal in dual moguls at the Italian Valmalenco. She has three podiums in the season of 2012/13, which includes 3rd place at the American Deer Valley and 3rd and 2nd places at the Swedish Åre. At the 2015 FIS World Freestyle Championships in Krieschberg, Austria, she won her first world championship medal, a bronze in dual moguls, behind the 2014 and 2010 Olympic champions, Justine Dufour Lapointe (silver) and Hannah Kearney (gold). Two years later, at the world championships in Sierra Nevada, she upgraded to silver, behind gold medalist Perrine Laffont and ahead of bronze medalist Jaelin Kauf.

Galysheva won the first world champion title for Kazakh moguls at the FIS Freestyle skiing and Snowboarding Championships 2019. And her Olympic bronze medal at Pyeongchang 2018 is also historical for Kazakh freestyle skiing because it is the first Olympic medal in this sport for Kazakhstan.

She also represented Kazakhstan at the 2022 Winter Olympics.

== Career highlights ==
Olympic Games
2018 – PyeongChang (bronze) 3rd, Moguls

FIS Freestyle World Ski Championships
2019 – Utah (gold) 1st, Moguls
2017 – Sierra Nevada (silver) 2nd, Dual moguls
2021 – Almaty (silver) 2nd, Moguls
2015 – Kreischberg (bronze) 3rd, Dual moguls

FIS Junior World Ski Championships
2011 – Jyväskylä (gold) 1st, Moguls
2012 – Valmalenco (gold) 1st, Moguls
2012 – Valmalenco (bronze) 3rd, Dual moguls

Asian Winter Games
2011 – Almaty (gold) 1st, Moguls
2011 – Almaty (gold) 1st, Dual moguls

World Cup podiums
2010 – Meribel (gold) 1st, Dual moguls
2012 – Beida Lake (bronze) 3rd, Moguls
2013 – Deer Valley (bronze) 3rd, Dual moguls
2013 – Åre (bronze) 3rd, Moguls
2013 – Åre (silver) 2nd, Dual moguls
2014 – Deer Valley, (silver) 2nd, Moguls
2014 – Ruka, (gold) 1st, Dual Moguls
2016 – Deer Valley, (silver) 2nd, Moguls
2016 – Deer Valley, (silver) 2nd, Dual Moguls
2016 – Tazawako, (silver) 2nd, Dual Moguls
2017 – Thaiwoo, (silver) 2nd, Moguls
2017 – Thaiwoo (gold) 1st, Moguls
2018 – Mont-Tremblant, (bronze) 3rd, Moguls
2018 – Ruka, (silver) 2nd, Moguls
2018 – Thaiwoo (bronze) 3rd, Moguls
2018 – Calgary (gold) 1st, Moguls
