= Regina Rakhimova =

Russian freestyle skier

Personal information
- Born: September 22, 1989 (age 36) Chusovoy, Russian SSR

Sport
- Sport: Skiing
Medal record
Representing Russia

Regina Rakhimova (born September 22, 1989 in Chusovoy) is a Russian freestyle skier, specializing in Moguls .

Rakhimova competed at the 2010 Winter Olympics for Russia. She placed 19th in the qualifying round of the moguls, advancing to the final, where she placed 9th.

As of April 2013, her best showing at the World Championships is 7th, in the 2011 moguls event.

Rakhimova made her World Cup debut in January 2009. As of March 2013, her best finish at a World Cup event is 4th, at Are in 2010/11. Her best World Cup overall finish in moguls is 11th, in 2010/11.
