= Hedvig Wessel =

Norwegian freestyle skier

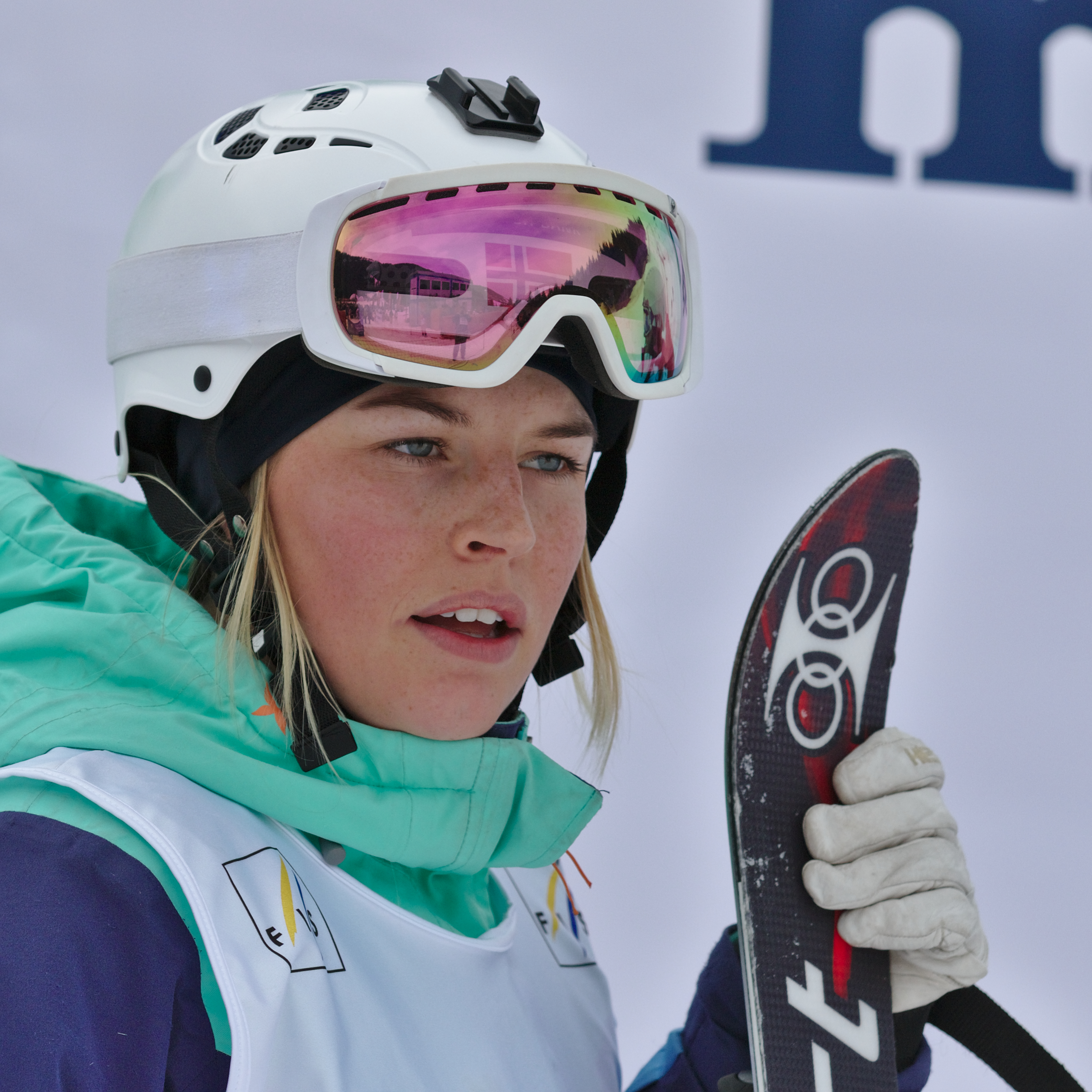

Personal information
- Nationality: Norwegian
- Born: 25 August 1995 (age 29); Oslo, Norway

Sport
- Sport: Freestyle skiing
- Club: IL Heming

Hedvig Wessel (born 25 August 1995) is a Norwegian freestyle skier. She was born in Oslo. She competed at the 2014 Winter Olympics in Sochi.

She represents the club IL Heming.
