= Melanie Meilinger =

Austrian freestyle skier

Personal information
- Born: 27 June 1991 (age 34)
- Height: 1.66 m (5 ft 5 in)

Sport
- Country: Austria
- Sport: Freestyle skiing

Melanie Meilinger (born 27 June 1991) is an Austrian freestyle skier. She competed in the 2018 Winter Olympics in the moguls event.
