= Deborah Scanzio =

Italian freestyle skier

Personal information
- Born: 25 December 1986 (age 39) Faido, Switzerland

Sport
- Sport: Skiing

World Cup career
- Indiv. podiums: 3
Medal record
Women's freestyle skiing
Representing Italy
World Championships
Bronze medal – third place	2007 Madonna di Campiglio	Moguls
- Updated on July 24, 2013

Deborah Scanzio (born 25 December 1986 in Faido) is a Swiss-born Italian freestyle skier, specializing in Moguls.

Scanzio competed at the 2006 and 2010 Winter Olympics for Italy. Her best finish was in moguls, when she placed 13th in the qualifying round, and 9th in the final. In 2010, she again advanced to the moguls final, advancing to the final, where she placed 8th.

As of April 2013, she has one World Championships medal, a bronze in the moguls event in 2007.

Scanzio made her World Cup debut in December 2002. As of April 2013, she has three World Cup podium finishes, taking silver each time, twice in 2007/08 and once in 2006/07. Her best World Cup overall finish in moguls is 9th, in 2007/08.

== World Cup podiums ==
Date	Location	Rank	Event
5 February 2007	La Plagne	2nd place, silver medalist(s)	Moguls
18 January 2008	Lake Placid	2nd place, silver medalist(s)	Moguls
26 January 2008	Mont Gabriel	2nd place, silver medalist(s)	Moguls
