= Seo Jee-won =

South Korean freestyle skier

Personal information
- Born: April 13, 1994 (age 32) Seoul, South Korea

Sport
- Sport: Skiing

- Seo Jee-won
- Hangul: 서지원
- RR: Seo Jiwon
- MR: Sŏ Chiwŏn

Seo Jee-won (Korean: 서지원; born April 13, 1994 in Seoul) is a South Korean freestyle skier specializing in moguls.

Seo competed at the 2014 Winter Olympics for South Korea. She placed 24th in the first qualifying round in the moguls, failing to advance. In the second qualifying round, she placed 13th, again not advancing.

As of March 2017, her best showing at the World Championships is 4th place in the 2017 dual moguls. She lost in the semifinals to eventual silver medalist Yulia Galysheva and missed out on bronze to American Jaelin Kauf.

Seo made her World Cup debut in February 2012. As of September 2015, her best World Cup finish is 6th place in a dual moguls event at Deer Valley in 2014–15. Her best World Cup overall finish in halfpipe is 23rd in 2014–15.
