= Chloé Dufour-Lapointe =

Canadian freestyle skier

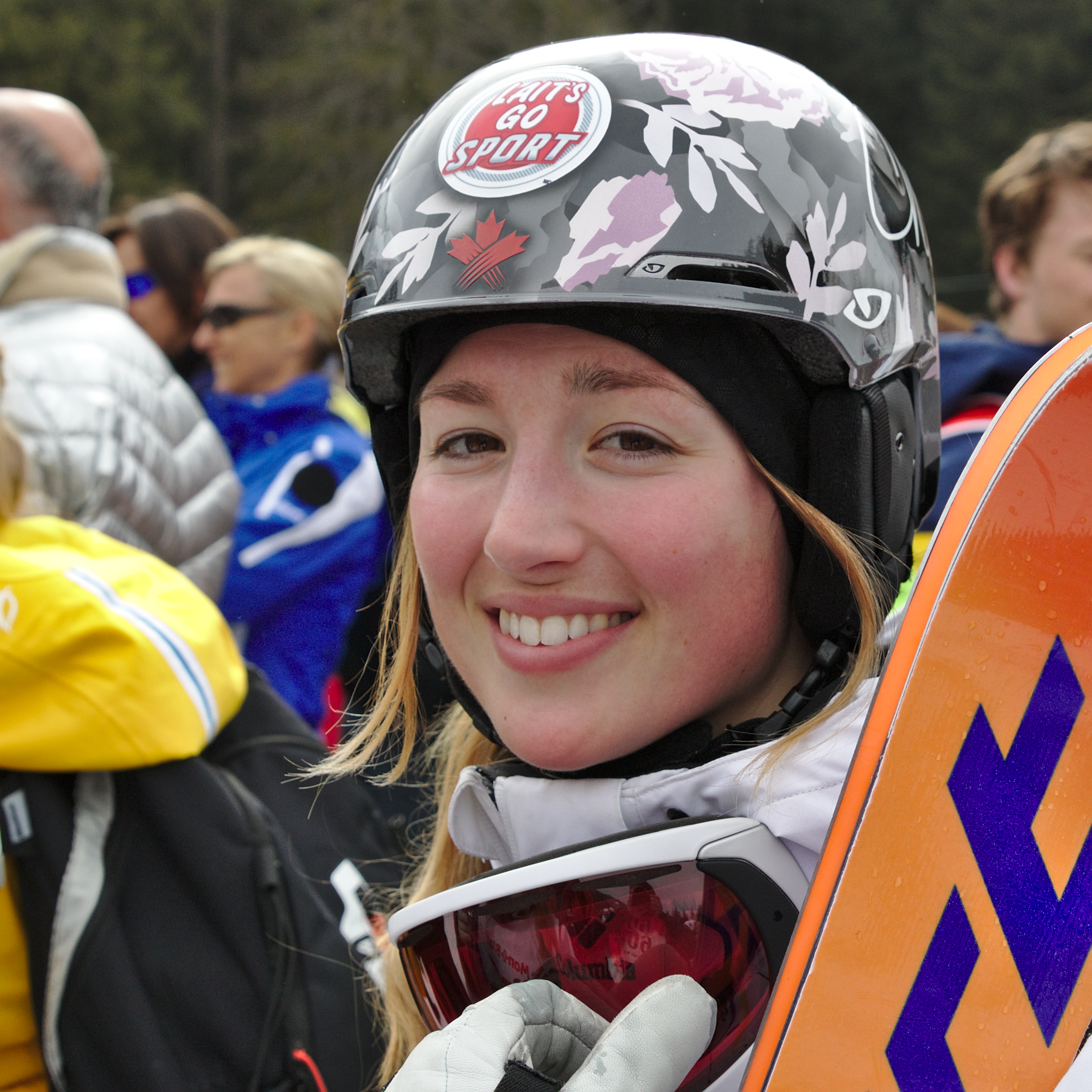
- Dufour-Lapointe in 2015

Personal information
- Born: 2 December 1991 (age 34) Montreal, Quebec, Canada
- Height: 1.65 m (5 ft 5 in)
- Weight: 61 kg (134 lb)

Sport
- Country: Canada
- Sport: Freestyle skiing
Medal record
Olympic Games
Silver medal – second place	2014 Sochi	Moguls
FIS Freestyle World Ski Championships
Gold medal – first place	2013 Voss	Dual moguls
Silver medal – second place	2011 Deer Valley	Dual moguls

Chloé Dufour-Lapointe (born 2 December 1991) is a Canadian freestyle skier. She was the 2013 FIS World Champion in dual moguls with her winning run at the 2013 World Championships. Dufour-Lapointe was the runner-up and silver medallist at the FIS Freestyle World Ski Championships 2011 as well and placed fifth at the 2010 Olympic Games. She won silver at the 2014 Olympic Games behind her sister Justine.

== Career ==
Her first Winter Olympics competition was at the 2010 Winter Olympics Women's moguls in Vancouver, where she finished in fifth place on 13 February 2010. Her sisters Maxime Dufour-Lapointe and Justine Dufour-Lapointe are also moguls competitors, the latter having won a World Championship medal and a gold medal at the 2014 Olympics.

Dufour-Lapointe's first international success came at the 2011 World Championships. In the dual moguls event, she advanced to the final against teammate and idol, Jennifer Heil. Dufour-Lapointe lost the race but walked away with the silver medal. Heil had nothing but kind words to say for the rising star, saying, "It was so cool to go against Chloe in the final. She's the next generation, and she'll be here for a long time with such a bright future. My last run down the hill at a world championships, it's really amazing to ski against her."

For the next couple of years, Dufour-Lapointe found limited success on the World Cup tour though she still found herself on the podium several times. This led up to the 2013 World Championships; in her first matchup in the dual moguls, she was up against sister Justine who she would beat 19–16. From here, Dufour-Lapointe went on a run and made it to the final, where she edged out a World Championship victory by a single point. This was the first major title of her career and one that springboarded her into the Sochi Olympics in 2014.

At the 2014 Sochi Olympics, Chloe competed in Moguls along with her sisters Justine and Maxime. This was the fifth time that three siblings have competed together in the same event at the Winter Games. Chloé finished second overall in the event to her sister Justine, with a score of 21.66. The sisters earned Canada's first gold and silver medals of the Sochi Olympics.

At the 2015 World Championships, she had a disappointing competition. She failed to make it to the moguls finals after making mistakes in the qualifying round. Her sister Justine took the gold. She was the reigning world champion in dual moguls and was a favourite to medal. However, in the semi-finals, she lost to her sister Justine and made the bronze medal match, where small mistakes put her second to Yulia Galysheva, putting her into fourth place overall.

On January 24, 2022, Dufour-Lapointe was named to Canada's 2022 Olympic team.

== Personal life ==
Dufour-Lapointe studied fashion marketing at Cégep Marie-Victorin.

== See also ==
- List of Olympic medalist families
