= Seo Jung-hwa =

South Korean freestyle skier

Seo Jung-Hwa
Personal information
- Born: 27 September 1990 (age 35) Gyeonggi Province, South Korea
- Height: 5 ft 4 in (163 cm)
- Weight: 132 lb (60 kg)

Sport
- Country: South Korea
- Sport: Freestyle skiing
Medal record
Representing South Korea

- Seo Jung-hwa
- Hangul: 서정화
- RR: Seo Jeonghwa
- MR: Sŏ Chŏnghwa

Seo Jung-hwa (Korean: 서정화; born 27 September 1990) is a South Korean freestyle skier specializing in mogul skiing, who has competed since 2006. She started attending USC in 2008. She qualified for 2010 Winter Olympics in 2009 by placing 15th in the 2009 World Championships. Seo went on to compete in the 2010 Olympics in moguls, where she placed 21st.

Seo also competed in the 2018 Winter Olympics in moguls, finishing 30th.
