= Britteny Cox =

Australian freestyle skier (born 1994)

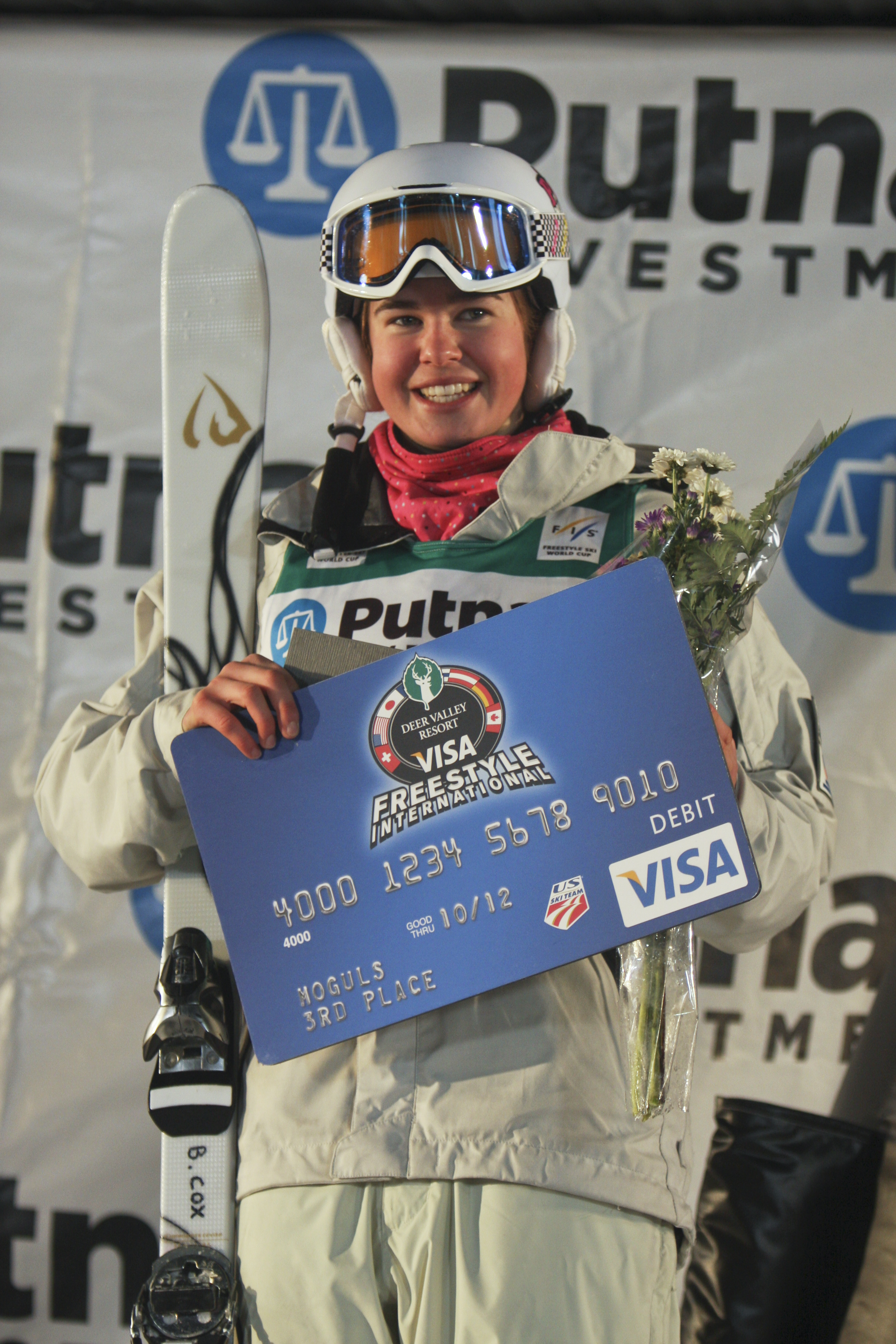
- Cox in 2012

Personal information
- Born: 29 September 1994 (age 31) Wodonga, Victoria, Australia
- Height: 163 cm (5 ft 4 in)
- Weight: 59 kg (130 lb)

Sport
- Country: Australia
- Sport: Freestyle skiing
- Event: Mogul skiing
- Coached by: Steve Desovich, Jerry Grossi
Medal record
Representing Australia
Women's Freestyle skiing
World Championships
| Gold medal – first place | 2017 Sierra Nevada | Moguls |
| Bronze medal – third place | 2015 Kreischberg | Moguls |

Britteny Cox (born 29 September 1994) is an Australian mogul skier. Growing up in the Victorian alpine resort of Falls Creek, Cox was born into a mogul skiing environment, with her family passionate mogul skiers.

Cox was the youngest athlete to compete at the Vancouver 2010 Olympic Winter Games.

Since the Vancouver Olympics, Cox has continued to improve, winning Australia's first-ever female World Cup mogul skiing medal, after finishing third at the 2011–12 FIS Freestyle Skiing World Cup in Deer Valley, Utah. In 2013 Cox won her second World Cup bronze at the 2012–13 FIS Freestyle Skiing World Cup. She won the Crystal Globe for Women's Moguls at the 2016–17 FIS Freestyle Ski World Cup with seven victories and several other podium finishes. She is the first female Australian mogul skier to win the crystal globe.

Cox competed at the FIS Freestyle World Ski Championships 2011, FIS Freestyle World Ski Championships 2013, and at the 2014 Winter Olympics.

She is a scholarship athlete with the Olympic Winter Institute of Australia and the Australian Institute of Sport.
