= 2005–06 FIS Freestyle Skiing World Cup =

Freestyle skiing competitive season

Freestyle Skiing World Cup 2005/06
Discipline	Men	Women
Overall	(Czech Republic) Tomáš Kraus	(France) Ophélie David
Moguls	(Australia) Dale Begg-Smith	(Canada) Jennifer Heil
Aerials	(Belarus) Dmitri Dashinski	(Switzerland) Evelyne Leu
Ski Cross	(Czech Republic) Tomáš Kraus	(France) Ophélie David
Halfpipe	(Finland) Kalle Leinonen	(France) Anaïs Caradeux
- Nations Cup: Canada

Competition
Locations	16	16
Individual	29	29

The 2005/06 FIS Freestyle Skiing World Cup was the twenty seventh World Cup season in freestyle skiing organised by International Ski Federation. The season started on 3 September 2005 and ended on 19 March 2006. This season included four disciplines: aerials, moguls, ski cross and halfpipe.

There were no dual mogul events on world cup calendar this season.

== Men ==
=== Moguls ===
Num	Season	Date	Place	Event	Winner	Second	Third
237	1	14 December 2005	(France) Tignes	MO	(Finland) Tapio Luusua	(Japan) Yugo Tsukita	(Finland) Sami Mustonen
238	2	18 December 2005	(Germany) Oberstdorf	MO	(Australia) Dale Begg-Smith	(United States) Travis Mayer	(Australia) Michael Robertson
239	3	7 January 2006	(Canada) Mont Gabriel	MO	(Canada) Alexandre Bilodeau	(United States) Jeremy Bloom	(Finland) Janne Lahtela
240	4	13 January 2006	(United States) Deer Valley	MO	(United States) Toby Dawson	(Finland) Janne Lahtela	(Australia) Dale Begg-Smith
241	5	20 January 2006	(United States) Lake Placid	MO	(Australia) Dale Begg-Smith	(Canada) Alexandre Bilodeau	(United States) Toby Dawson
242	6	22 January 2006	(United States) Lake Placid	MO	(Australia) Dale Begg-Smith	(Finland) Sami Mustonen	(Finland) Tapio Luusua
243	7	28 January 2006	(Italy) Madonna di Campiglio	MO	(Australia) Dale Begg-Smith	(Finland) Sami Mustonen	(Finland) Janne Lahtela
244	8	4 February 2006	(Czech Republic) Špindlerův Mlýn	MO	(Canada) Alexandre Bilodeau	(Australia) Dale Begg-Smith	(United States) Nathan Roberts
245	9	1 March 2006	(South Korea) Jisan	MO	(Australia) Dale Begg-Smith	(France) Guilbaut Colas	(United States) David Digravio
246	10	5 March 2006	(Japan) Inawashiro	MO	(Finland) Mikko Ronkainen	(Japan) Kai Ozaki	(Canada) Pierre-Alexandre Rousseau
247	11	18 March 2006	(Canada) Apex	MO	(Australia) Dale Begg-Smith	(Canada) Warren Tanner	(France) Guilbaut Colas

=== Aerials ===
Num	Season	Date	Place	Event	Winner	Second	Third
238	1	3 September 2005	(Australia) Mt. Buller	AE	(United States) Jeret Peterson	(Canada) Kyle Nissen	(United States) Joe Pack
239	2	4 September 2005	(Australia) Mt. Buller	AE	(United States) Ryan St. Onge	(United States) Eric Bergoust	(Belarus) Aleksei Grishin
240	3	16 December 2005	(China) Changchun	AE	(Canada) Warren Shouldice	(Belarus) Dmitri Dashinski	(Canada) Kyle Nissen
241	4	18 December 2005	(China) Changchun	AE	(Belarus) Dmitri Dashinski	(Canada) Kyle Nissen	(Canada) Steve Omischl
242	5	8 January 2006	(Canada) Mont Gabriel	AE	(Canada) Kyle Nissen	(Canada) Jeff Bean	(Canada) Warren Shouldice
243	6	13 January 2006	(United States) Deer Valley	AE	(United States) Ryan St. Onge	(United States) Joe Pack	(Belarus) Dmitri Dashinski
244	7	14 January 2006	(United States) Deer Valley	AE	(Belarus) Dmitri Dashinski	(Canada) Warren Shouldice	(Canada) Kyle Nissen
245	8	21 January 2006	(United States) Lake Placid	AE	(Canada) Ryan Blais	(Canada) Jeff Bean	(United States) Jeret Peterson
246	9	5 February 2006	(Czech Republic) Špindlerův Mlýn	AE	(Belarus) Dmitri Dashinski	(China) Xiaopeng Han	(Belarus) Dmitri Rak
247	10	3 March 2006	(Switzerland) Davos	AE	(Canada) Steve Omischl	(Belarus) Aleksei Grishin	(Czech Republic) Aleš Valenta
248	11	19 March 2006	(Canada) Apex	AE	(Belarus) Dmitri Dashinski	(Canada) Ryan Blais	(Czech Republic) Aleš Valenta

=== Ski Cross ===
Num	Season	Date	Place	Event	Winner	Second	Third
18	1	14 January 2006	(France) Les Contamines	SX	(Czech Republic) Tomáš Kraus	(Italy) Massimiliano Iezza	(France) Enak Gavaggio
19	2	20 January 2006	(Austria) Kreischberg	SX	(Czech Republic) Tomáš Kraus	(Switzerland) Michael Schmid	(Austria) Markus Wittner
20	3	3 February 2006	(Czech Republic) Pec pod Sněžkou	SX	(France) Enak Gavaggio	(Italy) Karl Heinz Molling	(Austria) Markus Wittner
21	4	11 March 2006	(Spain) Sierra Nevada	SX	(Czech Republic) Tomáš Kraus	(Austria) Roman Hofer	(Czech Republic) Stanley Hayer
22	5	12 March 2006 (Note: replaces skicross event from Apex for men.)	(Spain) Sierra Nevada	SX	(Austria) Roman Hofer	(Czech Republic) Tomáš Kraus	(Czech Republic) Stanley Hayer

=== Halfpipe ===
Num	Season	Date	Place	Event	Winner	Second	Third
4	1	15 January 2006	(France) Les Contamines	HP	(Finland) Kalle Leinonen	(Canada) Micheal Riddle	(France) Alexandre Laube
5	2	17 March 2006	(Canada) Apex	HP	(Finland) Kalle Leinonen	(Norway) Anders Murud	(Canada) Matthew Hayward

== Ladies ==
=== Moguls ===
Num	Season	Date	Place	Event	Winner	Second	Third
237	1	14 December 2005	(France) Tignes	MO	(United States) Hannah Kearney	(Canada) Jennifer Heil	(Sweden) Sara Kjellin
238	2	18 December 2005	(Germany) Oberstdorf	MO	(Canada) Jennifer Heil	(Canada) Kristi Richards	(Czech Republic) Nikola Sudová
239	3	7 January 2006	(Canada) Mont Gabriel	MO	(Norway) Kari Traa	(Canada) Jennifer Heil	(Czech Republic) Nikola Sudová
240	4	13 January 2006	(United States) Deer Valley	MO	(United States) Michelle Roark	(Canada) Jennifer Heil	(Sweden) Sara Kjellin
241	5	20 January 2006	(United States) Lake Placid	MO	(United States) Michelle Roark	(Canada) Stéphanie St-Pierre	(Norway) Kari Traa
242	6	22 January 2006	(United States) Lake Placid	MO	(Norway) Kari Traa	(Canada) Jennifer Heil	(United States) Jillian Vogtli
243	7	28 January 2006	(Italy) Madonna di Campiglio	MO	(Canada) Jennifer Heil	(United States) Hannah Kearney	(Austria) Margarita Marbler
244	8	4 February 2006	(Czech Republic) Špindlerův Mlýn	MO	(Norway) Kari Traa	(France) Sandra Laoura	(United States) Michelle Roark
245	9	1 March 2006	(South Korea) Jisan	MO	(Canada) Jennifer Heil	(Norway) Kari Traa	(United States) Hannah Kearney
246	10	5 March 2006	(Japan) Inawashiro	MO	(Canada) Jennifer Heil	(France) Sandra Laoura	(Japan) Aiko Uemura
247	11	18 March 2006	(Canada) Apex	MO	(Czech Republic) Nikola Sudová	(Canada) Jennifer Heil	(United States) Hannah Kearney

=== Aerials ===
Num	Season	Date	Place	Event	Winner	Second	Third
240	1	3 September 2005	(Australia) Mt. Buller	AE	(China) Nina Li	(China) Nannan Xu	(Belarus) Alla Tsuper
241	2	4 September 2005	(Australia) Mt. Buller	AE	(China) Nina Li	(Belarus) Alla Tsuper	(China) Shuang Cheng
242	3	16 December 2005	(China) Changchun	AE	(China) Jiao Wang	(China) Zhao Shanshan	(Switzerland) Evelyne Leu
243	4	18 December 2005	(China) Changchun	AE	(China) Nannan Xu	(China) Xin Zhang	(Canada) Veronika Bauer
244	5	8 January 2006	(Canada) Mont Gabriel	AE	(Switzerland) Evelyne Leu	(Switzerland) Manuela Müller	(Ukraine) Tetiana Kozachenko
245	6	13 January 2006	(United States) Deer Valley	AE	(Australia) Lydia Ierodiaconou	(Switzerland) Manuela Müller	(China) Nina Li
246	7	14 January 2006	(United States) Deer Valley	AE	(China) Xinxin Guo	(Canada) Veronika Bauer	(Belarus) Alla Tsuper
247	8	21 January 2006	(United States) Lake Placid	AE	(Switzerland) Evelyne Leu	(Canada) Amber Peterson	(Russia) Anna Zukal
248	9	5 February 2006	(Czech Republic) Špindlerův Mlýn	AE	(China) Nina Li	(Belarus) Alla Tsuper	(Switzerland) Manuela Müller
249	10	3 March 2006	(Switzerland) Davos	AE	(Australia) Jacqui Cooper	(Belarus) Alla Tsuper	(Switzerland) Evelyne Leu
250	11	19 March 2006	(Canada) Apex	AE	(Belarus) Alla Tsuper	(China) Shuang Cheng	(United States) Emily Cook

=== Ski Cross ===
Num	Season	Date	Place	Event	Winner	Second	Third
18	1	14 January 2006	(France) Les Contamines	SX	(Austria) Karin Huttary	(France) Ophélie David	(Sweden) Magdalena Iljans
19	2	20 January 2006	(Austria) Kreischberg	SX	(Sweden) Magdalena Iljans	(France) Ophélie David	(Austria) Karin Huttary
20	3	3 February 2006	(Czech Republic) Pec pod Sněžkou	SX	(France) Ophélie David	(Austria) Karin Huttary	(Finland) Josefiina Kilpinen
21	4	11 March 2006	(Spain) Sierra Nevada	SX	(France) Ophélie David	(France) Méryll Boulangeat	(Austria) Karin Huttary
22	5	12 March 2006 (Note: replaces skicross event from Apex for ladies.)	(Spain) Sierra Nevada	SX	(Sweden) Magdalena Iljans	(Austria) Karin Huttary	(France) Ophélie David

=== Halfpipe ===
Num	Season	Date	Place	Event	Winner	Second	Third
4	1	15 January 2006	(France) Les Contamines	HP	(France) Anaïs Caradeux	(Switzerland) Mirjam Jäger	(Sweden) Marta Ahrenstedt
5	2	17 March 2006	(Canada) Apex	HP	(Canada) Sarah Burke	(United States) Jennifer Hudak	(Norway) Ingrid Berntsen

== Men's standings ==
=== Overall ===
Rank		Points
1	(Czech Republic) Tomáš Kraus	86
2	(Australia) Dale Begg-Smith	75
3	(Austria) Roman Hofer	57
4	(Belarus) Dmitri Dashinski	53
5	(Canada) Kyle Nissen	50

- Standings after 29 races.

=== Moguls ===
Rank		Points
1	(Australia) Dale Begg-Smith	821
2	(Canada) Alexandre Bilodeau	506
3	(Finland) Sami Mustonen	399
4	(United States) Toby Dawson	294
5	(United States) Nathan Roberts	282

- Standings after 11 races.

=== Aerials ===
Rank		Points
1	(Belarus) Dmitri Dashinski	589
2	(Canada) Kyle Nissen	549
3	(Canada) Warren Shouldice	449
4	(Canada) Ryan Blais	404
5	(United States) Ryan St. Onge	369

- Standings after 11 races.

=== Ski Cross ===
Rank		Points
1	(Czech Republic) Tomáš Kraus	430
2	(Austria) Roman Hofer	286
3	(France) Enak Gavaggio	221
4	(Czech Republic) Stanley Hayer	219
5	(Sweden) Jesper Brugge	195

- Standings after 5 races.

=== Halfpipe ===
Rank		Points
1	(Finland) Kalle Leinonen	200
2	(Canada) Micheal Riddle	112
3	(France) Xavier Bertoni	90
4	(Canada) Matthew Hayward	89
5	(Norway) Anders Murud	80

- Standings after 2 races.

== Ladies' standings ==
=== Overall ===
Rank		Points
1	(France) Ophélie David	84
2	(Austria) Karin Huttary	76
3	(Canada) Jennifer Heil	75
4	(Sweden) Magdalena Iljans	66
5	(Norway) Kari Traa	53

- Standings after 29 races.

=== Moguls ===
Rank		Points
1	(Canada) Jennifer Heil	829
2	(Norway) Kari Traa	586
3	(United States) Michelle Roark	528
4	(Czech Republic) Nikola Sudová	499
5	(United States) Hannah Kearney	395

- Standings after 11 races.

=== Aerials ===
Rank		Points
1	(Switzerland) Evelyne Leu	524
2	(Belarus) Alla Tsuper	507
3	(Switzerland) Manuela Müller	438
4	(China) Nina Li	436
5	(United States) Emily Cook	349

- Standings after 11 races.

=== Ski Cross ===
Rank		Points
1	(France) Ophélie David	420
2	(Austria) Karin Huttary	380
3	(Sweden) Magdalena Iljans	329
4	(France) Méryll Boulangeat	217
5	(Finland) Josefiina Kilpinen	169

- Standings after 5 races.

=== Halfpipe ===
Rank		Points
1	(France) Anaïs Caradeux	140
2	(Switzerland) Mirjam Jäger	106
3	(Canada) Sarah Burke	100
4	(United States) Jennifer Hudak	80
5	(Canada) Rosalind Groenewoud	68

- Standings after 2 races.

== Nations Cup ==
=== Overall ===
Rank		Points
1	Canada	744
2	United States	591
3	France	497
4	Switzerland	367
5	Austria	282

- Standings after 58 races.

=== Men ===
Rank		Points
1	Canada	454
2	United States	277
3	France	253
4	Austria	181
5	Finland	160

- Standings after 29 races.

=== Ladies ===
Rank		Points
1	United States	314
2	Canada	290
3	France	244
4	Switzerland	215
5	China	155

- Standings after 29 races.
