= 2008–09 FIS Freestyle Skiing World Cup =

Freestyle skiing competitive season

Freestyle Skiing World Cup 2008/09
Discipline	Men	Women
Overall	(Canada) Alexandre Bilodeau	(France) Ophélie David
Moguls	(Canada) Alexandre Bilodeau	(United States) Hannah Kearney
Aerials	(Canada) Steve Omischl	(Australia) Lydia Lassila
Ski Cross	(Czech Republic) Tomáš Kraus	(France) Ophélie David
Halfpipe	(France) Kevin Rolland	(Switzerland) Virginie Faivre
- Nations Cup: Canada

Competition
Locations	16	16
Individual	27	29
Cancelled	3	1

The 2008/09 FIS Freestyle Skiing World Cup was the thirtieth World Cup season in freestyle skiing organised by International Ski Federation. The season started on 18 December 2008 and ended on 20 March 2009. This season included four disciplines: moguls, ski cross, aerials and halfpipe.

Dual mogul counted together with moguls ranking and for moguls title.

== Men ==
=== Moguls ===
Num	Season	Date	Place	Event	Winner	Second	Third
35	1	18 December 2008	(France) Meribel	DM	(Canada) Pierre-Alexandre Rousseau	(Canada) Alexandre Bilodeau	(France) Anthony Benna
36	2	14 February 2009	(Sweden) Åre	DM	(Canada) Alexandre Bilodeau	(France) Guilbaut Colas	(Canada) Maxime Gringas
		21 February 2009	(Norway) Myrkdalen-Voss	DM	cancelled		
264	1	24 January 2009	(Canada) Mont Gabriel	MO	(Canada) Vincent Marquis	(Canada) Alexandre Bilodeau	(Canada) Pierre-Alexandre Rousseau
265	2	29 January 2009	(United States) Deer Valley	MO	(France) Guilbaut Colas	(Canada) Alexandre Bilodeau	(United States) Patrick Deneen
266	3	31 January 2009	(United States) Deer Valley	MO	(France) Guilbaut Colas	(United States) David Babic	(Russia) Alexandr Smyshlyaev
267	4	7 February 2009	(Canada) Cypress Mountain	MO	(Canada) Alexandre Bilodeau	(Japan) Yugo Tsukita	(France) Guilbaut Colas
268	5	13 February 2009	(Sweden) Åre	MO	(Canada) Alexandre Bilodeau	(Canada) Pierre-Alexandre Rousseau	(Canada) Vincent Marquis
269	6	20 February 2009	(Norway) Myrkdalen-Voss	MO	(Canada) Alexandre Bilodeau	(Finland) Tapio Luusua	(United States) Michael Morse
270	7	18 March 2009	(France) La Plagne	MO	(Canada) Alexandre Bilodeau	(France) Guilbaut Colas	(France) Pierre Ochs

=== Ski Cross ===
Num	Season	Date	Place	Event	Winner	Second	Third
34	1	5 January 2009	(Austria) St. Johann in Tirol/Oberndorf	SX	(Switzerland) Michael Schmid	(Austria) Andreas Matt	(Sweden) Tommy Eliasson
35	2	10 January 2009	(France) Les Contamines	SX	(Austria) Andreas Matt	(Canada) Christopher Del Bosco	(Austria) Markus Wittner
36	3	5 January 2009	(France) Flaine	SX	(Czech Republic) Tomáš Kraus	(United States) Casey Puckett	(Sweden) Eric Iljans
37	4	19 January 2009	(United States) Lake Placid	SX	(Sweden) Lars Lewen	(Austria) Patrick Koller	(Czech Republic) Tomáš Kraus
38	5	6 February 2009	(Canada) Cypress Mountain	SX	(Canada) Christopher Del Bosco	(Canada) Stanley Hayer	(Canada) Davey Barr
39	6	19 February 2009	(Norway) Myrkdalen-Voss	SX	(Czech Republic) Tomáš Kraus	(Austria) Thomas Zangerl	(Austria) Andreas Matt
40	7	24 February 2009	(Sweden) Branäs	SX	(Sweden) Lars Lewen	(Canada) Christopher Del Bosco	(Switzerland) Michael Schmid
41	8	14 March 2009	(Switzerland) Meiringen-Hasliberg	SX	(Switzerland) Andreas Steffen	(Canada) Christopher Del Bosco	(France) Xavier Kuhn
		15 March 2009	(Switzerland) Meiringen-Hasliberg	SX	cancelled		
42	9	20 March 2009	(France) La Plagne	SX	(Czech Republic) Tomáš Kraus	(Switzerland) Armin Niederer	(Canada) Stanley Hayer

=== Aerials ===
Num	Season	Date	Place	Event	Winner	Second	Third
		19 December 2008	(China) Adventure Mountain	AE	cancelled		
264	1	20 December 2008	(China) Adventure Mountain	AE	(Belarus) Alexei Grishin	(China) Ke Li	(Canada) Warren Shouldice
265	2	18 January 2009	(United States) Lake Placid	AE	(United States) Jeret Peterson	(Canada) Kyle Nissen	(Canada) Warren Shouldice
266	3	25 January 2009	(Canada) Mont Gabriel	AE	(Canada) Steve Omischl	(Belarus) Timofei Slivets	(Switzerland) Thomas Lambert
267	4	30 January 2009	(United States) Deer Valley	AE	(United States) Ryan St. Onge	(China) Zhongqing Liu	(Canada) Steve Omischl
268	5	6 February 2009	(Canada) Cypress Mountain	AE	(Canada) Steve Omischl	(Belarus) Anton Kushnir	(Ukraine) Stanislav Kravchuk
269	6	14 February 2009	(Russia) Moscow	AE	(United States) Ryan St. Onge	(Belarus) Dmitri Dashinski	(Ukraine) Stanislav Kravchuk

=== Halfpipe ===
Num	Season	Date	Place	Event	Winner	Second	Third
10	1	11 January 2009	(France) Les Contamines	HP	(France) Xavier Bertoni	(Switzerland) Nils Lauper	(France) Kevin Rolland
11	2	29 January 2009	(United States) Park City Mountain Resort	HP	(France) Kevin Rolland	(France) Xavier Bertoni	(United States) Walter Wood
12	3	19 March 2009	(France) La Plagne	HP	(France) Kevin Rolland	(United States) David Wise	(Switzerland) Nils Lauper

== Women ==
=== Moguls ===
Num	Season	Date	Place	Event	Winner	Second	Third
34	1	18 December 2008	(France) Meribel	DM	(United States) Hannah Kearney	(Canada) Jennifer Heil	(Czech Republic) Nikola Sudová
35	2	14 February 2009	(Sweden) Åre	DM	(United States) Hannah Kearney	(Japan) Aiko Uemura	(Austria) Margarita Marbler
		21 February 2009	(Norway) Myrkdalen-Voss	DM	cancelled		
264	1	24 January 2009	(Canada) Mont Gabriel	MO	(Japan) Aiko Uemura	(Canada) Jennifer Heil	(United States) Hannah Kearney
265	2	29 January 2009	(United States) Deer Valley	MO	(United States) Hannah Kearney	(United States) Michelle Roark	(Austria) Margarita Marbler
266	3	31 January 2009	(United States) Deer Valley	MO	(Canada) Jennifer Heil	(United States) Hannah Kearney	(Czech Republic) Nikola Sudová
267	4	7 February 2009	(Canada) Cypress Mountain	MO	(Canada) Jennifer Heil	(United States) Hannah Kearney	(Austria) Margarita Marbler
268	5	13 February 2009	(Sweden) Åre	MO	(Austria) Margarita Marbler	(Canada) Jennifer Heil	(Japan) Aiko Uemura
269	6	20 February 2009	(Norway) Myrkdalen-Voss	MO	(Japan) Aiko Uemura	(Czech Republic) Nikola Sudová	(Japan) Miki Ito
270	7	18 March 2009	(France) La Plagne	MO	(Austria) Margarita Marbler	(Czech Republic) Nikola Sudová	(Canada) Chloé Dufour-Lapointe

=== Ski Cross ===
Num	Season	Date	Place	Event	Winner	Second	Third
34	1	5 January 2009	(Austria) St. Johann in Tirol/Oberndorf	SX	(France) Marion Josserand	(Austria) Katharina Gutensohn	(Canada) Kelsey Serwa
35	2	10 January 2009	(France) Les Contamines	SX	(Norway) Hedda Berntsen	(France) Ophelie David	(Austria) Katrin Ofner
36	3	5 January 2009	(France) Flaine	SX	(France) Ophelie David	(Canada) Ashleigh McIvor	(Austria) Karin Huttary
37	4	19 January 2009	(United States) Lake Placid	SX	(France) Ophelie David	(Australia) Jenny Owens	(France) Meryl Boulangeat
38	5	6 February 2009	(Canada) Cypress Mountain	SX	(Canada) Aleisha Cline	(Canada) Ashleigh McIvor	(Austria) Karin Huttary
39	6	19 February 2009	(Norway) Myrkdalen-Voss	SX	(France) Ophelie David	(Austria) Katharina Gutensohn	(Austria) Karin Huttary
40	7	24 February 2009	(Sweden) Branäs	SX	(France) Ophelie David	(Austria) Katarina Huttary	(Canada) Ashleigh McIvor
41	8	12 March 2009	(Switzerland) Grindelwald	SX	(France) Ophelie David	(France) Marion Josserand	(Switzerland) Sanna Lüdi
42	9	14 March 2009	(Switzerland) Meiringen-Hasliberg	SX	(Austria) Katharina Gutensohn	(France) Ophelie David	(Canada) Julia Murray
43	10	20 March 2009	(France) La Plagne	SX	(France) Ophelie David	(Canada) Kelsey Serwa	(Switzerland) Emilie Serain

=== Aerials ===
Num	Season	Date	Place	Event	Winner	Second	Third
266	1	19 December 2008	(China) Adventure Mountain	AE	(Australia) Lydia Lassila	(Australia) Jacqui Cooper	(Canada) Veronika Bauer
267	2	20 December 2008	(China) Adventure Mountain	AE	(China) Shanshan Zhao	(China) Nina Li	(Australia) Lydia Lassila
268	3	18 January 2009	(United States) Lake Placid	AE	(Belarus) Alla Tsuper	(China) Mengtao Xu	(United States) Emily Cook
269	4	25 January 2009	(Canada) Mont Gabriel	AE	(Australia) Lydia Lassila	(China) Shuang Cheng	(China) Shanshan Zhao
270	5	30 January 2009	(United States) Deer Valley	AE	(China) Nina Li	(China) Xinxin Guo	(United States) Emily Cook
271	6	6 February 2009	(Canada) Cypress Mountain	AE	(Switzerland) Evelyne Leu	(China) Shuangfei Dai	(China) Shuang Cheng
272	7	14 February 2009	(Russia) Moscow	AE	(China) Mengtao Xu	(China) Shuang Cheng	(Australia) Lydia Lassila

=== Halfpipe ===
Num	Season	Date	Place	Event	Winner	Second	Third
10	1	11 January 2009	(France) Les Contamines	HP	(Switzerland) Virginie Faivre	(Japan) Miyuki Hatanaka	(United States) Jessica Reedy
11	2	29 January 2009	(United States) Park City Mountain Resort	HP	(United States) Angeli Vanlaanen	(Canada) Megan Gunning	(France) Anais Caradeux
12	3	19 March 2009	(France) La Plagne	HP	(France) Anais Caradeux	(Switzerland) Virginie Faivre	(Canada) Rosalind Groenewoud

== Men's standings ==
=== Overall ===
Rank		Points
1	(Canada) Alexandre Bilodeau	88
2	(Canada) Steve Omischl	64
3	(Czech Republic) Tomáš Kraus	64
4.	(France) Guilbaut Colas	63
5.	(United States) Ryan St. Onge	52

- Standings after 27 races.

=== Moguls ===
Rank		Points
1	(Canada) Alexandre Bilodeau	790
2	(France) Guilbaut Colas	564
3	(Canada) Vincent Marquis	362
4	(Canada) P.A. Rousseau	313
5	(France) Anthony Brenna	288

- Standings after 9 races.

=== Aerials ===
Rank		Points
1	(Canada) Steve Omischl	382
2	(United States) Ryan St. Onge	313
3	(United States) Jeret Peterson	248
4	(Canada) Kyle Nissen	203
5	(Belarus) Alexei Grishin	184

- Standings after 6 races.

=== Ski Cross ===
Rank		Points
1	(Czech Republic) Tomáš Kraus	574
2	(Canada) Christopher Del Bosco	462
3	(Sweden) Lars Lewen	423
4	(United States) Casey Puckett	319
5	(Canada) Stanley Hayer	300

- Standings after 9 races.

=== Halfpipe ===
Rank		Points
1	(France) Kevin Rolland	260
2	(France) Xavier Bertoni	220
3	(Switzerland) Nils Lauper	140
4	(United States) David Wise	102
5	(France) Vivien Thiery	97

- Standings after 3 races.

== Women's standings ==
=== Overall ===
Rank		Points
1	(France) Ophélie David	86
2	(United States) Hannah Kearney	71
3	(Canada) Jennifer Heil	64
4	(Austria) Margarita Marbler	62
5	(Australia) Lydia Lassila	51

- Standings after 29 races.

=== Moguls ===
Rank		Points
1	(United States) Hannah Kearney	642
2	(Canada) Jennifer Heil	574
3	(Austria) Margarita Marbler	464
4	(Czech Republic) Nikola Sudová	456
5	(Japan) Aiko Uemura	439

- Standings after 9 races.

=== Aerials ===
Rank		Points
1	(Australia) Lydia Lassila	360
2	(China) Nina Li	336
3	(China) Shuang Cheng	300
4	(China) Mengtao Xu	282
5	(Switzerland) Evelyn Leu	244

- Standings after 7 races.

=== Ski Cross ===
Rank		Points
1	(France) Ophélie David	860
2	(Austria) Katharina Gutensohn	469
3	(Canada) Kelsey Serwa	416
4	(Austria) Karin Huttary	413
5	(Canada) Ashleigh McIvor	364

- Standings after 10 races.

=== Halfpipe ===
Rank		Points
1	(Switzerland) Virginie Faivre	230
2	(France) Anais Caradeux	205
3	(Canada) Megan Gunning	116
4	(United States) Jessica Reedy	105
5	(United States) Angelie Vanlaanen	100

- Standings after 3 races.

== Nations Cup ==
=== Overall ===
Rank		Points
1	Canada	5772
2	United States	3625
3	France	3419
4	Switzerland	2465
5	Austria	2267

- Standings after 56 races.

=== Men ===
Rank		Points
1	Canada	3093
2	United States	1960
3	France	1804
4	Switzerland	1246
5	Sweden	951

- Standings after 27 races.

=== Ladies ===
Rank		Points
1	Canada	2679
2	United States	1665
3	France	1615
4	Austria	1503
5	Switzerland	1219

- Standings after 29 races.
