= Freestyle skiing at the 2006 Winter Olympics – Women's aerials =

Women's aerials at the XX Olympic Winter Games
- Pictogram for freestyle skiing
- Venue: Sauze d'Oulx
- Dates: 21 February (qualification); 22 February (final)
- Competitors: 23 from 9 nations
- Winning score: 202.55

Medalists
1st place, gold medalist(s)		Evelyne Leu	Switzerland
2nd place, silver medalist(s)		Li Nina	China
3rd place, bronze medalist(s)		Alisa Camplin	Australia

The Women's aerials event in freestyle skiing at the 2006 Winter Olympics in Turin, Italy began on 21 February and concluded on 22 February at Sauze d'Oulx.

== Results ==
=== Qualification ===
The qualification round took place on 21 February, with 23 skiers competing. The top 12 advanced to the final.

Rank	Name	Country	Jump 1	Jump 2	Total	Notes
1	Jacqui Cooper	Australia	113.80	99.56	213.36	Q
2	Guo Xinxin	China	105.45	99.42	204.87	Q
3	Li Nina	China	98.87	90.06	188.93	Q
4	Evelyne Leu	Switzerland	83.60	96.77	180.37	Q
5	Veronika Bauer	Canada	94.29	82.37	176.66	Q
6	Anna Zukal	Russia	88.35	83.89	172.24	Q
7	Xu Nannan	China	80.72	91.29	172.01	Q
8	Alla Tsuper	Belarus	88.83	80.16	168.99	Q
9	Manuela Mueller	Switzerland	95.88	72.43	168.31	Q
10	Alisa Camplin	Australia	69.97	95.35	165.32	Q
11	Oly Slivets	Belarus	88.72	74.48	163.20	Q
12	Wang Jiao	China	71.55	88.67	160.22	Q
13	Olha Volkova	Ukraine	86.01	74.02	160.03	
14	Lydia Ierodiaconou	Australia	101.52	53.93	155.45	
15	Amber Peterson	Canada	80.64	72.43	153.07	
16	Jana Lindsey	United States	79.38	70.85	150.23	
17	Olga Koroleva	Russia	76.75	71.75	148.40	
18	Tatiana Kozachenko	Ukraine	69.44	78.07	147.51	
19	Emily Cook	United States	60.32	84.10	144.42	
20	Nadiya Didenko	Ukraine	80.16	56.75	136.91	
21	Kayo Henmi	Japan	57.48	71.92	129.40	
22	Deidra Dionne	Canada	69.79	58.51	128.30	
23	Elizabeth Gardner	Australia	65.56	61.86	127.42	

=== Final ===
The final took place on the evening of 22 February. Evelyne Leu was 5th after her first jump, but on her second she earned the highest score of the final round, a 107.93, to win the gold medal.

Rank	Athlete	Jump 1	Jump 2	Total
Gold medal	Evelyne Leu (SUI)	94.62	107.93	202.55
Silver medal	Li Nina (CHN)	100.81	96.58	197.39
Bronze medal	Alisa Camplin (AUS)	94.99	96.40	191.39
4	Xu Nannan (CHN)	98.70	92.53	191.23
5	Oly Slivets (BLR)	87.50	90.25	177.75
6	Guo Xinxin (CHN)	103.17	71.68	174.85
7	Manuela Mueller (SUI)	73.49	85.65	159.14
8	Jacqui Cooper (AUS)	78.97	73.72	152.69
9	Anna Zukal (RUS)	81.90	70.14	152.04
10	Alla Tsuper (BLR)	53.58	84.26	137.84
11	Wang Jiao (CHN)	61.51	71.02	132.53
12	Veronika Bauer (CAN)	67.32	58.33	125.65
