= The Will to Fly =

2016 feature documentary

- Directed by: Katie Bender Wynn; Leo Baker
- Produced by: Katie Bender Wynn
- Starring: Lydia Lassila
- Cinematography: Leo Baker
- Edited by: Jane Usher; Ellen Dimler
- Music by: Thomas E Rouch
- Production company: Binding Films
- Release date: 8 March 2016
- Running time: 99 minutes
- Country: Australia
- Language: English

The Will to Fly is a 2016 feature documentary film about the Australian Olympic freestyle skier gold medalist Lydia Lassila.

The film was produced by Katie Bender Wynn who co-directed with Leo Baker. The film made its Australian premiere in Melbourne on International Women's Day (8 March), 2016 followed by a theatrical release.

== Synopsis ==
The Will to Fly is the story of Olympic Champion Lydia Lassila who, as a young mum competed in one of the world's most dangerous sports, and dares to reach for a dream.

The film shows Lydia’s journey: from her first love, gymnastics, to her transition into an aerial skiing career. After winning the gold medal at her third Olympic games in 2010, Lydia became a mother. She then returned to aerial skiing with the intent of becoming the first woman to perform the sport's most complex acrobatic manoeuvre; one that had only ever been achieved by male aerialists before her.

The film chronicles Lydia’s lifelong pursuit to reach personal fulfilment by achieving her true potential, on the world stage at the Sochi Olympics in 2014.

== Impact ==
In October 2015, before the release of The Will To Fly, the film was used as a catalyst in convincing NSW (Australian) parliament to invest in a $10 million Olympic training facility so that the Australian Winter Olympic team could train on home soil.

"It has been 10 years in the making, but Australia’s Winter Olympic leaders finally have the green light to build a water ramp facility that will underpin future international success".

NSW Sports Minister Stuart Ayres announced in June 2016 that the $10 million facility will be built at the Lake Ainsworth Sport and Recreation Centre at Lennox Head in subtropical northern NSW.

"The godfather of Australian winter sport, Olympic Winter Institute chairman Geoff Henke, believes a screening of a documentary on Lassila’s preparation for the Sochi Winter Olympics, The Will to Fly, in the NSW parliament house this year achieved the breakthrough. Ayres and his office staff all attended, as did Treasury staff".

“That’s when they understood what it was all about. Henke said."

In August 2017, Olympic champion hurdler Sally Pearson made headlines worldwide after coming out of retirement to win the 2017 world championship title. Pearson told the media that her comeback to sport was motivated after watching The Will To Fly film on a plane in 2016.

"The acclaimed movie ‘The Will to Fly’ struck a chord with Pearson and triggered a series of events that ultimately led to her triumphant return in London." “I was on a plane going from the Gold Coast,” Pearson said. “I was scrolling through the movies on the TV and came across it.”

The Rio Olympics were about to start but Pearson wasn’t there to defend her crown because injuries had forced her withdrawal just a few weeks earlier.

“I was in such a horrible dark place, more so because I’m such a harsh critic of myself,” Pearson told the BBC.

“When I missed the Olympics, I hated everything, I hated everyone and I didn’t want to be anywhere.

“I wanted to run away but there was a voice in the back of my head saying, ‘But what if, what if, what if’.

“I watched her movie and she had those what ifs and she still did it, Lydia came out better for it.”

By the time she’d left Gold Coast airport, the 2012 Olympic champion had decided she would not only return to her sport but would also coach herself.

“I was on a bit of a downer at that moment, I’d been let down by a few people,” Pearson said.

“My injuries have been a result of maybe bad coaching, bad choices as well.

“I didn’t really know what I wanted and whether to stay in the sport, whether to retire.

“Then I thought, ‘What the hell am I going to do? I don’t really have anything else but my sport’.

“I walked off the plane and still had the movie stuck in my head.

“As soon as I walked out the door of the airport, I was like, ‘Right I am coaching myself, I’m going stay in sport and we’ll see what happens.”

Pearson, 30, went back to training and within 12 months was the champion of the world again.

“As soon as I made that decision everything seemed light again and easy and I made choices, I made the right choices,” she said.

“The main thing to have is resilience. I found that in me, I found the resilience.

“So I want to send huge thanks (to Lydia) for her putting that movie out which I choose to watch.”

== Film awards and nominations ==
- Winner, Best World Documentary Award, Whistler Film Festival 2016
- Winner, Best Mountain Culture Film Award, Whistler Film Festival 2016
- Winner, Award Of Excellence, Impact Doc Awards 2017
- Nomination, APRA AMCOS award for Best Music in Documentary, APRA AMCOS Awards Australia 2016

== Participants ==
- Lydia Lassila
- Jacqui Cooper
- Alisa Camplin
- Kai Lassila
- Lauri Lassila
- Phyllis Ierodiaconou
- Kirstie Marshall
- Frank Bare, Jr.
- Chick Ierodiaconou
- Peter Braun
- Dennis Capicik
- Lainie Cole
- Dmitri Dashinski
- Elizabeth Gardner
- Jeffrey Hodges
- George Ierodiaconou
- Peppi Ierodiaconou
- Erkki Lassila
- Leena Lassila
- Xu Mengtao
- David Morris
- Bree Munroe
- Daniel Murphy
- Li Nina
- Steve Omischl
- Michel Roth
- Warren Shouldice
- Cord Spero
- Dusty Wilson
