= Freestyle skiing at the 2002 Winter Olympics – Women's aerials =

Women's aerials at the XIX Olympic Winter Games
- Venue: Park City
- Dates: 16 February (qualification); 18 February (final)
- Competitors: 21 from 10 nations
- Winning score: 193.47

Medalists
1st place, gold medalist(s)		Alisa Camplin	Australia
2nd place, silver medalist(s)		Veronica Brenner	Canada
3rd place, bronze medalist(s)		Deidra Dionne	Canada

The Women's Aerials event in freestyle skiing at the 2002 Winter Olympics in Salt Lake City, United States took place on 16 and 18 February at Park City.

== Results ==
=== Qualification ===
The qualification was held on 16 February at 10:00. The top 12 advanced to the final.

Rank	Name	Country	Jump 1	Jump 2	Total	Notes
1	Evelyne Leu	Switzerland	103.74	99.42	203.16	Q
2	Alisa Camplin	Australia	93.89	89.77	183.66	Q
3	Alla Tsuper	Belarus	95.85	85.52	181.37	Q
4	Li Nina	China	88.83	92.47	181.30	Q
5	Deidra Dionne	Canada	90.56	83.95	174.51	Q
6	Natalya Orekhova	Russia	88.04	81.49	169.53	Q
7	Anna Zukal	Russia	79.89	89.30	169.19	Q
8	Veronica Brenner	Canada	87.41	80.62	168.03	Q
9	Veronika Bauer	Canada	75.28	92.30	167.58	Q
10	Lydia Ierodiaconou	Australia	82.21	83.85	166.06	Q
11	Olga Koroleva	Russia	75.69	85.83	161.52	Q
12	Xu Nannan	China	82.37	78.27	160.64	Q
13	Oly Slivets	Belarus	83.00	74.96	157.96	
14	Tracy Evans	United States	85.05	67.02	152.07	
15	Tatiana Kozachenko	Ukraine	79.89	71.34	151.23	
16	Hilde Synnøve Lid	Norway	62.20	86.62	148.82	
17	Brenda Petzold	United States	58.58	79.22	137.80	
18	Wang He	China	74.09	62.68	136.77	
19	Guo Xinxin	China	53.55	76.76	130.31	
20	Manuela Müller	Switzerland	53.70	71.77	125.47	
21	Liselotte Johansson	Sweden	84.89	40.31	125.20	

=== Final ===
The final was held on 18 February at 12:00.

Rank	Athlete	Jump 1	Jump 2	Total
Gold medal	Alisa Camplin (AUS)	93.72	99.75	193.47
Silver medal	Veronica Brenner (CAN)	90.09	99.93	190.02
Bronze medal	Deidra Dionne (CAN)	88.98	100.28	189.26
4	Olga Koroleva (RUS)	97.65	90.72	188.37
5	Li Nina (CHN)	87.25	97.98	185.23
6	Anna Zukal (RUS)	83.52	90.72	174.24
7	Natalya Orekhova (RUS)	86.15	84.39	170.54
8	Lydia Ierodiaconou (AUS)	84.49	84.89	169.38
9	Alla Tsuper (BLR)	96.73	68.19	164.92
10	Veronika Bauer (CAN)	84.66	69.22	153.88
11	Evelyne Leu (SUI)	72.39	74.92	147.31
12	Xu Nannan (CHN)	62.48	73.48	135.96
