= Leo Baker =

Leo Baker may refer to:

- Leo Baker (director)
- Leo Baker (skateboarder) (born 1991), American skateboarder
