= Freestyle skiing at the 2010 Winter Olympics – Women's aerials =

Women's aerials at the XXI Olympic Winter Games
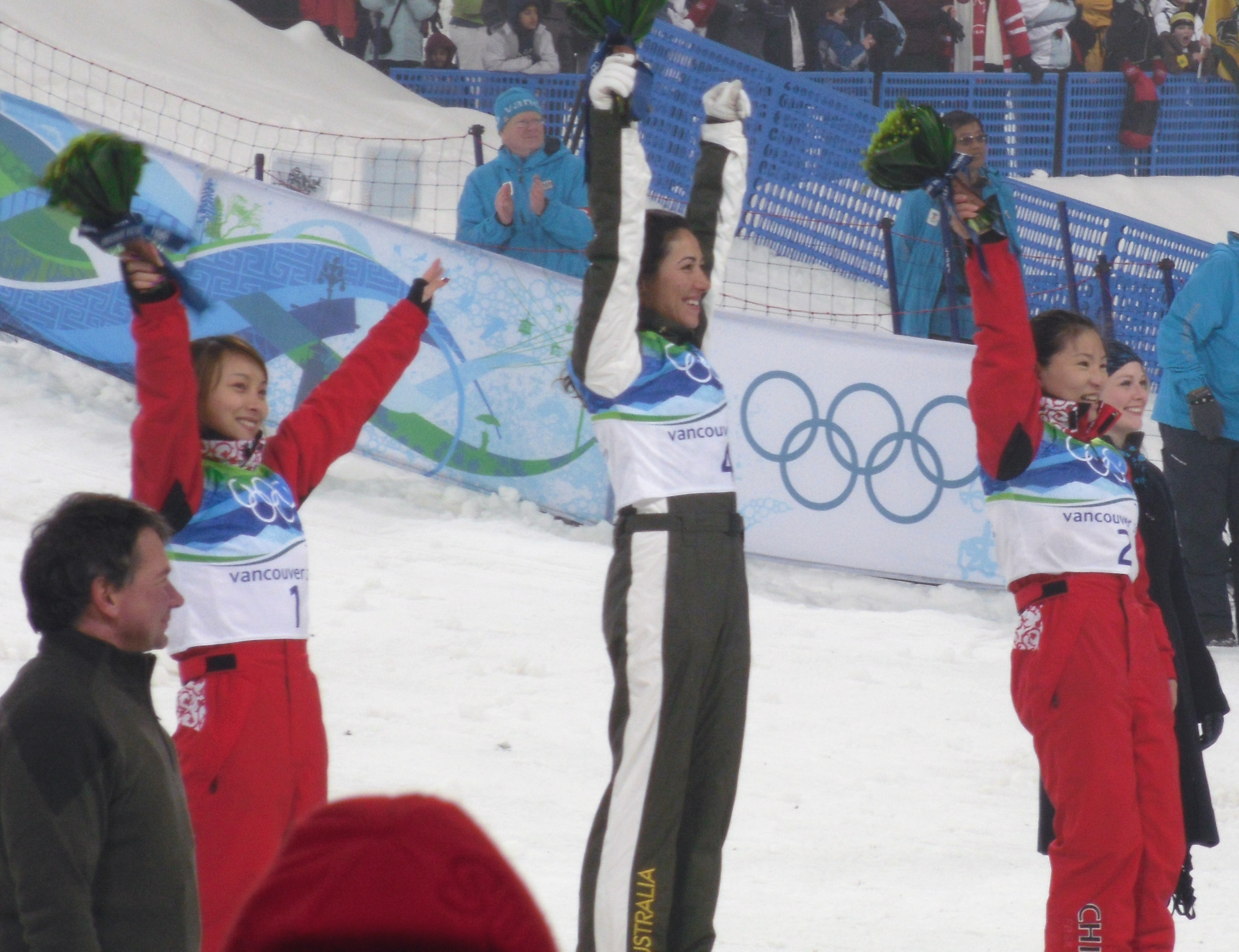
- Flower ceremony for the winners of the Women's Aerials. From left: Li Nina (silver), Lydia Lassila (gold) and Guo Xinxin (bronze)
- Venue: Cypress Bowl Ski Area
- Dates: 20 February (qualification); 24 February (final)
- Competitors: 23 from 10 nations
- Winning score: 214.74

Medalists
| 1st place, gold medalist(s) | | Lydia Lassila | Australia |
| 2nd place, silver medalist(s) | | Li Nina | China |
| 3rd place, bronze medalist(s) | | Guo Xinxin | China |

The women's aerials event in freestyle skiing at the 2010 Winter Olympics in Vancouver, Canada, took place on the February 20 (qualification) and February 24 (final) at Cypress Bowl Ski Area.

== Results ==
=== Qualification ===
The qualification was held on 20 February at 10:00.

| Rank | Bib | Name | Country | Jump 1 | Rank | Jump 2 | Rank | Total | Note |
|---|---|---|---|---|---|---|---|---|---|
| 1 | 25 | Alla Tsuper | Belarus | 105.64 | 1 | 90.12 | 4 | 195.76 | Q |
| 2 | 1 | Li Nina | China | 97.11 | 2 | 94.99 | 2 | 192.10 | Q |
| 3 | 2 | Guo Xinxin | China | 88.08 | 8 | 101.08 | 1 | 189.16 | Q |
| 4 | 6 | Cheng Shuang | China | 94.29 | 4 | 86.62 | 6 | 180.91 | Q |
| 5 | 18 | Emily Cook | United States | 86.31 | 12 | 93.94 | 3 | 180.25 | Q |
| 6 | 16 | Lacy Schnoor | United States | 87.77 | 10 | 81.74 | 10 | 169.51 | Q |
| 7 | 8 | Assoli Slivets | Belarus | 84.17 | 14 | 85.22 | 7 | 169.39 | Q |
| 8 | 3 | Xu Mengtao | China | 92.74 | 6 | 75.81 | 12 | 168.55 | Q |
| 9 | 4 | Lydia Lassila | Australia | 85.65 | 13 | 81.90 | 9 | 167.55 | Q |
| 10 | 19 | Elizabeth Gardner | Australia | 89.00 | 7 | 75.60 | 13 | 164.60 | Q |
| 11 | 24 | Jacqui Cooper | Australia | 87.88 | 9 | 75.11 | 14 | 162.99 | Q |
| 12 | 22 | Ashley Caldwell | United States | 79.66 | 16 | 82.68 | 8 | 162.34 | Q |
| 13 | 10 | Nadiya Didenko | Ukraine | 87.77 | 11 | 73.49 | 15 | 161.26 | |
| 14 | 17 | Olha Volkova | Ukraine | 82.53 | 15 | 78.25 | 11 | 160.78 | |
| 15 | 26 | Veronika Bauer | Canada | 94.47 | 3 | 65.99 | 17 | 160.46 | |
| 16 | 7 | Evelyne Leu | Switzerland | 93.75 | 5 | 61.75 | 19 | 155.50 | |
| 17 | 12 | Jana Lindsey | United States | 64.10 | 19 | 87.59 | 5 | 151.69 | |
| 18 | 9 | Bree Munro | Australia | 74.37 | 17 | 69.09 | 16 | 143.46 | |
| 19 | 11 | Tanja Schärer | Switzerland | 60.63 | 20 | 65.10 | 18 | 125.73 | |
| 20 | 21 | Olga Polyuk | Ukraine | 60.37 | 21 | 55.36 | 20 | 115.73 | |
| 21 | 30 | Martina Konopová | Czech Republic | 66.84 | 18 | 48.23 | 22 | 115.07 | |
| 22 | 23 | Sarah Ainsworth | Great Britain | 52.44 | 22 | 52.92 | 21 | 105.36 | |
| 23 | 28 | Zhibek Arapbayeva | Kazakhstan | 48.89 | 23 | 38.09 | 23 | 86.98 | |

=== Final ===
The final was held on 24 February at 19:30.

| Rank | Bib | Name | Country | Jump 1 | Rank | Jump 2 | Rank | Total | Note |
|---|---|---|---|---|---|---|---|---|---|
| 1st place, gold medalist(s) | 4 | Lydia Lassila | Australia | 106.25 | 2 | 108.49 | 1 | 214.74 | |
| 2nd place, silver medalist(s) | 1 | Li Nina | China | 99.40 | 4 | 107.83 | 2 | 207.23 | |
| 3rd place, bronze medalist(s) | 2 | Guo Xinxin | China | 98.82 | 5 | 106.40 | 3 | 205.22 | |
| 4 | 8 | Assoli Slivets | Belarus | 102.79 | 3 | 95.90 | 5 | 198.69 | |
| 5 | 24 | Jacqui Cooper | Australia | 90.82 | 7 | 103.47 | 4 | 194.29 | |
| 6 | 3 | Xu Mengtao | China | 108.74 | 1 | 82.87 | 11 | 191.61 | |
| 7 | 6 | Cheng Shuang | China | 94.64 | 6 | 93.23 | 7 | 187.87 | |
| 8 | 25 | Alla Tsuper | Belarus | 86.64 | 9 | 95.20 | 6 | 181.84 | |
| 9 | 16 | Lacy Schnoor | United States | 89.88 | 8 | 83.01 | 10 | 172.89 | |
| 10 | 22 | Ashley Caldwell | United States | 86.53 | 10 | 84.57 | 8 | 171.10 | |
| 11 | 18 | Emily Cook | United States | 65.03 | 11 | 83.89 | 9 | 148.92 | |
| 12 | 19 | Elizabeth Gardner | Australia | 63.09 | 12 | 23.61 | 12 | 86.70 | |
