= Freestyle skiing at the 2002 Winter Olympics – Men's aerials =

Men's aerials at the XIX Olympic Winter Games
- Venue: Park City
- Dates: 16 February (qualification); 19 February (final)
- Competitors: 25 from 11 nations
- Winning score: 257.02

Medalists
| 1st place, gold medalist(s) | | Aleš Valenta | Czech Republic |
| 2nd place, silver medalist(s) | | Joe Pack | United States |
| 3rd place, bronze medalist(s) | | Alexei Grishin | Belarus |

The Men's Aerials event in freestyle skiing at the 2002 Winter Olympics in Salt Lake City, United States took place on 16 and 19 February at Park City.

== Results ==
=== Qualification ===
The qualification was held on 16 February at 13:30. The top 12 advanced to the final.

| Rank | Name | Country | Jump 1 | Jump 2 | Total | Notes |
|---|---|---|---|---|---|---|
| 1 | Alexei Grishin | Belarus | 130.38 | 121.38 | 251.76 | Q |
| 2 | Eric Bergoust | United States | 127.71 | 116.59 | 244.30 | Q |
| 3 | Joe Pack | United States | 124.82 | 118.44 | 243.28 | Q |
| 4 | Steve Omischl | Canada | 115.92 | 126.38 | 242.30 | Q |
| 5 | Dmitry Rak | Belarus | 115.83 | 125.04 | 240.87 | Q |
| 6 | Andy Capicik | Canada | 118.65 | 121.04 | 239.69 | Q |
| 7 | Jeret Peterson | United States | 119.91 | 117.48 | 237.39 | Q |
| 8 | Aleš Valenta | Czech Republic | 119.48 | 115.03 | 234.51 | Q |
| 9 | Jeff Bean | Canada | 122.82 | 107.46 | 230.28 | Q |
| 10 | Brian Currutt | United States | 104.08 | 121.93 | 226.01 | Q |
| 11 | Stanislav Kravchuk | Ukraine | 111.02 | 114.66 | 225.68 | Q |
| 12 | Dmitri Dashinski | Belarus | 98.56 | 121.38 | 219.94 | Q |
| 13 | Christian Kaufmann | Switzerland | 111.78 | 103.12 | 214.90 | |
| 14 | Vladimir Lebedev | Russia | 101.46 | 112.38 | 213.84 | |
| 15 | Dmitry Arkhipov | Russia | 91.89 | 120.81 | 212.70 | |
| 16 | Nicolas Fontaine | Canada | 89.89 | 122.59 | 212.48 | |
| 17 | Miha Gale | Slovenia | 96.81 | 96.39 | 193.20 | |
| 18 | Qiu Sen | China | 93.75 | 93.67 | 187.42 | |
| 19 | Ou Xiaotao | China | 88.55 | 86.46 | 175.01 | |
| 20 | Taku Nakanishi | Japan | 79.89 | 83.00 | 162.89 | |
| 21 | Martin Walti | Switzerland | 81.59 | 78.97 | 160.56 | |
| 22 | Enver Ablaev | Ukraine | 102.87 | 53.97 | 156.84 | |
| 23 | Alexander Mikhailov | Russia | 70.98 | 75.65 | 146.63 | |
| 24 | Han Xiaopeng | China | 73.71 | 71.20 | 144.91 | |
| 25 | Clyde Getty | Argentina | 60.32 | 56.70 | 117.02 | |

=== Final ===
The final was held on 19 February at 12:00.

| Rank | Athlete | Jump 1 | Jump 2 | Total |
|---|---|---|---|---|
| Gold medal | Aleš Valenta (CZE) | 127.04 | 129.98 | 257.02 |
| Silver medal | Joe Pack (USA) | 129.49 | 122.15 | 251.64 |
| Bronze medal | Alexei Grishin (BLR) | 129.71 | 121.48 | 251.19 |
| 4 | Jeff Bean (CAN) | 128.60 | 122.37 | 250.97 |
| 5 | Stanislav Kravchuk (UKR) | 125.49 | 120.81 | 246.30 |
| 6 | Brian Currutt (USA) | 123.93 | 121.26 | 245.19 |
| 7 | Dmitri Dashinski (BLR) | 127.04 | 117.25 | 244.29 |
| 8 | Andy Capicik (CAN) | 117.18 | 126.60 | 243.78 |
| 9 | Jeret Peterson (USA) | 112.56 | 125.49 | 238.05 |
| 10 | Dmitri Rak (BLR) | 98.41 | 127.93 | 226.34 |
| 11 | Steve Omischl (CAN) | 100.34 | 121.70 | 222.04 |
| 12 | Eric Bergoust (USA) | 130.38 | 88.11 | 218.49 |
