= Simon Jecl =

Slovenian freestyle skier (born 1986)

Simon Jecl (born 14 April 1986) is a former Slovenian freestyle skier who specialized in the skicross discipline.

He made his World Cup debut in January 2008 in Les Contamines, and collected his first World Cup points in January 2009, with a 27th place in St. Johann in Tirol.

He represents the sports club SD Vagabund.

== World Cup ==
=== Cup standings ===
Season	Overall	Ski cross
2008–09	198th	54th
2009–10	–	–
2010–11	208th	62nd

== Other results ==
=== FIS Freestyle World Ski Championships ===
Rank	Year	Place	Discipline
34th	2009	(Japan) Inawashiro	Ski cross
