= Katie Bender =

Katie Bender may refer to:

- Katie Bender, victim of the Royal Canberra Hospital implosion
- Katie Bender (filmmaker) (born 1985), Australian film producer and director
