= Martina Konopová =

Czech freestyle skier

Personal information
- Born: 8 April 1986 (age 40) Šumperk, Czechoslovakia

Sport
- Sport: Skiing

Martina Konopová (born 8 April 1986 in Šumperk) is a Czech freestyle skier, specializing in aerials .

Konopová competed at the 2010 Winter Olympics for the Czech Republic. She placed 21st in the qualifying round of the aerials, failing to advance to the final.

Konopová made her World Cup debut in January 2009. As of April 2013, her best finish at a World Cup event is 10th, at Mont Gabriel in 2008/09. Her lone World Cup overall finish in aerials is 27th, in 2008/09.
