= Lacy Schnoor =

American freestyle skier

Personal information
- Born: June 12, 1985 (age 41) Draper, Utah, U.S.
- Height: 5 ft 3 in (160 cm)

Sport
- Country: United States
- Sport: Aerial skiing

Lacy Schnoor (born June 12, 1985) is an American freestyle skier who competed in the aerials discipline. At the women's aerials event of the 2010 Winter Olympics, she finished ninth.

Schnoor started competing in 2002, and made her FIS Freestyle Ski World Cup debut in 2005. Her World Cup best was an eighth-place finish in 2007. While her best finish at the FIS Freestyle World Ski Championships was seventh at Inawashiro 2009. Schnoor was the U.S. national champion in 2005.

== Life and career ==
Schnoor was born and raised in Draper, Utah, the second of four children to Steve and Pat Schnoor. Her father is a geophysicist while her mother is a nurse. Although her family skied recreationally, Schnoor initially competed in gymnastics and track and field (hurdling). While attending Crescent View Middle School in nearby Sandy, an Olympic outreach program visited and allowed students to try simulations of various winter sports. After trying aerial maneuvers on a bungee contraption, Schnoor was invited to an Olympic development summer camp. She then attended Alta High School in Sandy and was a cheerleader there. However, she had to finish her senior year through distance education to train year-round with the U.S. Ski Team. In 2002, she began competing in aerial skiing. She then graduated from high school in 2003.

On her FIS Freestyle Ski World Cup debut at Mont Tremblant on January 9, 2005, Schnoor finished tenth. She then won the U.S. National Aerial Championship at the Utah Olympic Park on March 25, 2005. She performed a full-full (two backflips with a 360-dregree spin during each flip) and a lay-full (a backflip and then a 360-degree spin backflip) to score 154.57 points. In 2006, she fractured a scapula after landing on her back on solid ice; while in 2007, she suffered a knee injury.

In her 2009 season, Schnoor achieved two top-ten finishes at World Cup events. She also finished seventh at the 2009 edition of the FIS Freestyle World Ski Championships in Inawashiro, Japan. Meanwhile, at the U.S. National Championships, she finished third—behind Jana Lindsey and Emily Cook. In December, she won the Olympic trials in Steamboat Springs, Colorado, earning her spot at the U.S. Ski Team for the 2010 Winter Olympics.

At the women's aerials finals of the Vancouver Winter Olympics on February 24, Schnoor finished ninth despite landing both jumps. Her U.S. teammates, Ashley Caldwell and Emily Cook, finished tenth and eleventh respectively. After the Olympics, Schnoor said she was certain to compete at World Cup events for one more year.

Schnoor and fellow winter sports athletes Clair Bidez, Hannah Teter, and Lindsey Vonn were featured in the 2010 Sports Illustrated Swimsuit Issue.

As of 2010, Schnoor was majoring in business at Westminster College in Salt Lake City.
