= Leo Baker (director) =

Australian director and filmmaker

- Born: Melbourne, Victoria, Australia
- Occupation(s): Writer, Director

Leo Baker is a writer and film director. Leo was the sole animator of the 2011 Oscar Award winning short animation The Lost Thing. Between 2013 and 2016 Leo co-directed a feature documentary film The Will To Fly about the life and sport career of Olympic freestyle aerial skier Lydia Lassila.

== Film career ==
Baker began working in the film industry in 1998 and worked as a clapper loader on TV commercials and feature films. During the later period of working in the camera department, he became strongly drawn to modern visual effects(VFX) after working on a variety of VFX heavy productions. In 2003 Baker transition to work within VFX, specialising in the animation department.

=== The Lost Thing ===
In 2007, Baker worked for Passion Pictures Australia on the animated film adaptation of Shaun Tan's picture story book, The Lost Thing. Baker worked closely with director Shaun Tan and Producer Sophie Byrne and one other VFX artists Tom Bryant working remotely from Scotland. In 2010 Baker completed animating The Lost Thing and it won many international awards, including the 2011 Academy Award for Best Animated Short Film, the 2010 Annecy Cristal, and the 2010 Grand Prix for Best Short Film at the Melbourne International Film Festival.

In 2011, Baker was awarded a Fellowship by The Winston Churchill Memorial Trust of Australia, to travel internationally researching methods for sustainable production and creative culture in the animation industry. Leo travelled to Japan, Hong Kong, USA, Canada, UK, France and Germany to research this study.

=== The Will To Fly ===
In 2013 Baker commenced working on the feature documentary The Will To Fly with partner Katie Bender (co-director and producer). They spent three years crafting the film, one of Australia's first feature length sport documentaries, about the life and tumultuous sport career of freestyle aerial skiing Olympic Champion Lydia Lassila.

As a sports film, Baker and Bender structured The Will To Fly with a classic construction with reflecting elements of the hero's journey.

=== Select filmography ===
- Off Course (2012) 8 minutes
- Love Notes (2013) 12 minutes
- The Will To Fly (2016) 99 minutes
