= Matildas: The World at Our Feet =

Disney+ original documentary series

- Genre: Documentary
- Directed by: Katie Bender Wynn
- Country of origin: Australia
- Original language: English
- No. of seasons: 1
- No. of episodes: 6

Production
- Executive producers: Christopher G Cowen; Steve Bibb
- Production companies: Disney+; Station 10; Barking Mad Productions; Boardwalk Pictures; Fremantle Media

Original release
- Network: Disney+
- Release: April 26, 2023

Matildas: The World at Our Feet is an Australian documentary television series which was released on April 26, 2023 on Disney+, prior to the 2023 FIFA Women's World Cup.

The six-part docu-series is an inspirational and intimate behind-the-scenes story about the Matildas, Australia women's national soccer team, as they prepare for the 2023 FIFA Women's World Cup.

== Background ==
Across six episodes, Matildas: The World at Our Feet follows the players on and off the field as they work towards their biggest challenge yet, the 2023 FIFA Women's World Cup on home soil. There has not yet been any information on when season 2 is coming out

The series features players including superstar Sam Kerr, Ellie Carpenter, Mary Fowler, and more. The series reveal the sacrifices they’ve made and struggles they’ve endured to become number one in the world's most popular sport.

== Production ==
The series is directed by Katie Bender Wynn with Steve Bibb and Christopher G Cowen serving as executive producers, and David Briegel-Jones as co-executive producer.

== Episodes ==
No.	Title	Directed by	Original release date
1	"Dare to Dream"	Katie Bender Wynn	April 26, 2023
To prepare for the 2023 World Cup, the Matildas play the world's best while the team faces a shock.
2	"We Are Family"	Katie Bender Wynn	April 26, 2023
After their shocking defeat at the AFC Asian Cup, the Matildas must find their way back to winning ways against arch-rivals New Zealand. The team also receives the traditional Welcome to Country along with a fumigation ceremony.
3	"A Special Bond"	Katie Bender Wynn	April 26, 2023
The Matildas are moved by the bond with their fans, while a star player suffers a shocking injury.
4	"Win A Player"	Katie Bender Wynn	April 26, 2023
With many senior players resting, the new generation of Matildas have the chance to claim World Cup selection; full-back Charlotte Grant replaces injured Ellie Carpenter.
5	"No Time to Waste"	Katie Bender Wynn	April 26, 2023
Mary Fowler joins one of the biggest clubs as senior players return to face Olympic champs, Canada.
6	"A Lasting Legacy"	Katie Bender Wynn	April 26, 2023
The Matildas are out for revenge against Sweden, world number two, the team that narrowly knocked them out of the 2020 Olympics. It will be their second meeting with them post their semi-final defeat in Japan.

== Filming ==
Filming locations include Australia, Dubai, France, London, Sweden, Spain, Portugal and the United States.

== Accolades ==
The series was nominated for Best Documentary or Factual Program at the AACTA Awards, with Katie Bender Wynn receiving a nomination for Best Direction in Nonfiction Television. The series was nominated for Best Factual or Documentary Program at the 2024 Logie Awards.

== See also ==
- List of Disney+ original programming
