= Hilda Kincaid =

Australian medical practitioner (1886–1967)

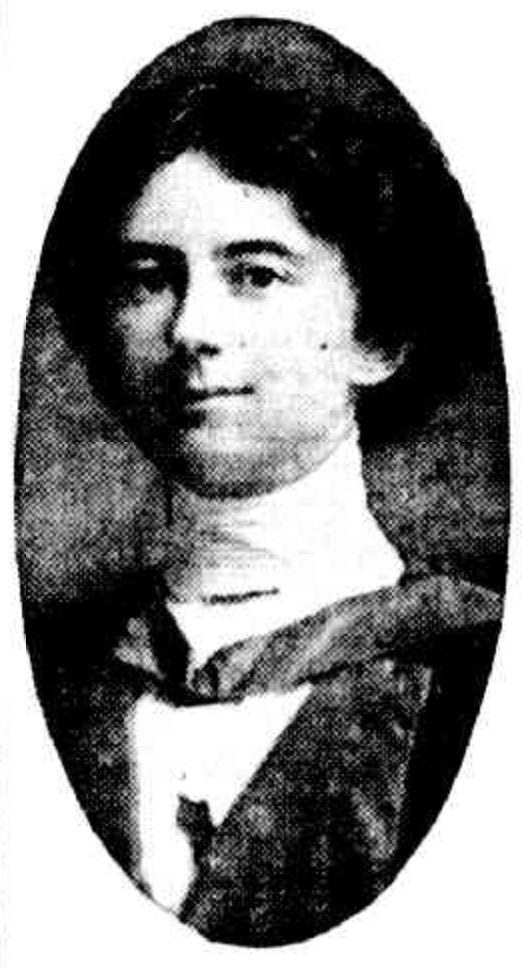
- Kincaid in 1912
- Born: Hilda Estelle Kincaid; 15 December 1886; Fitzroy, Victoria, Australia
- Died: 31 March 1967 (aged 80); East Malvern, Victoria, Australia
- Occupation: Medical practitioner

Hilda Estelle Kincaid (15 December 1886 – 31 March 1967) was an Australian medical practitioner and served as child welfare officer with the Melbourne City Council from 1927 to 1952.

== Early life and education ==
Kincaid was born in Fitzroy, Victoria on 15 December 1886. She completed her secondary schooling at Methodist Ladies' College in Kew as dux in 1902. Three years later she enrolled at the University of Melbourne, graduating in 1908 with a B.Sc., and in 1910 an M.Sc. She was awarded a Government scholarship. Her thesis, "Biochemical significance of phosphorus," won for her a D.Sc. in 1912.

She was employed by the University of Melbourne as a demonstrator and lectured in domestic science. She resigned to study medicine, graduating with an MB BS in 1920.

== Medical career ==
On graduation her first role was resident medical officer at Melbourne Hospital in 1920. From 1921 to 1926 she lived in Sydney as senior resident medical officer at the Renwick Hospital for Infants and also as medical officer for the Scarba Children's Home. In about 1922 she also worked as physiology demonstrator at the University of Sydney. In 1927 she served as assistant outpatient physician at the Rachel Foster Hospital for Women and Children in Sydney.

Kincaid returned to Melbourne in 1927 as medical officer responsible for children's welfare at Melbourne City Council.
