= Tomáš Kraus =

Czech skier

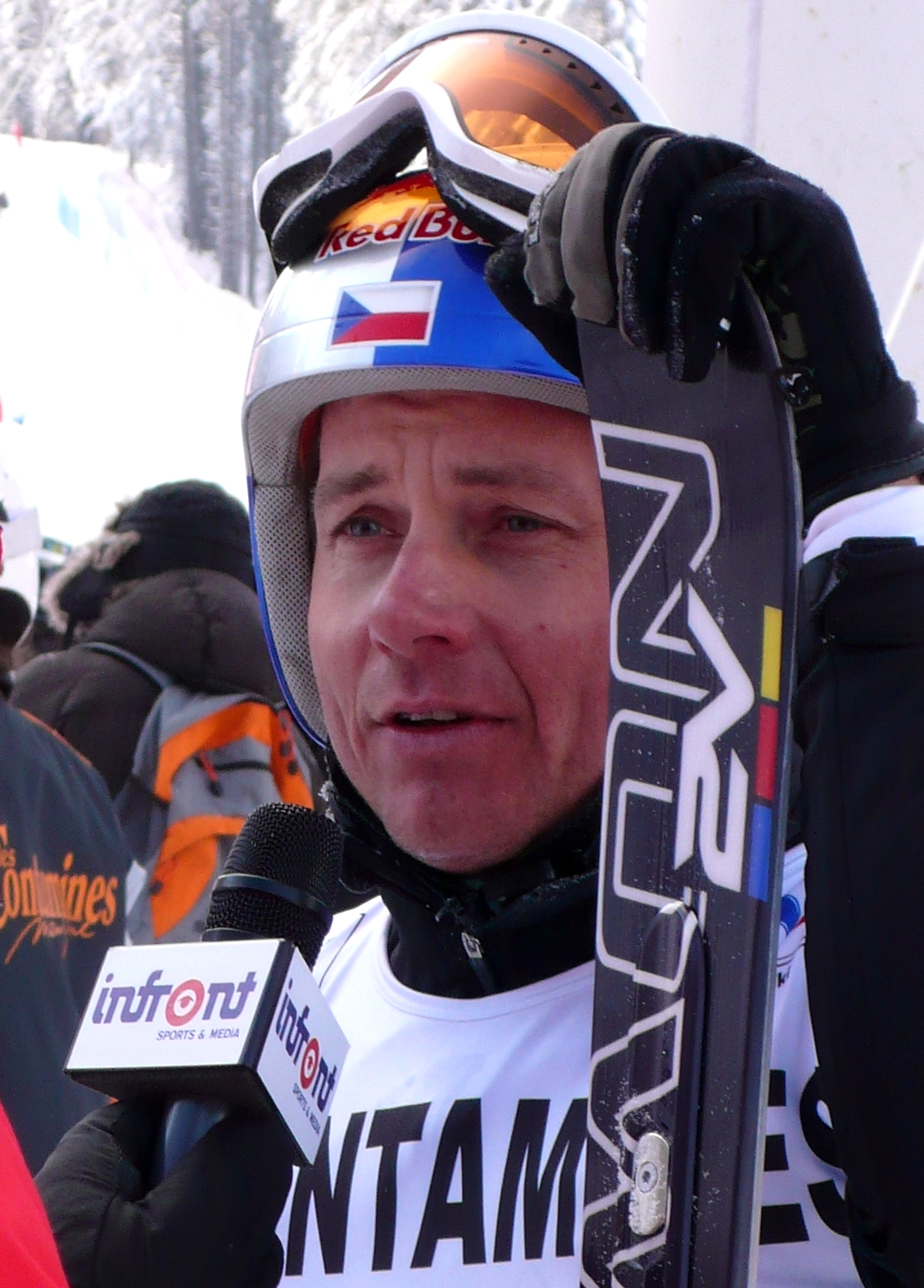
- Kraus at the 2010 Ski Cross World Cup in Les Contamines-Montjoie

Personal information
- Born: 3 March 1974 (age 52)

Sport
- Country: Czech Republic
- Sport: Freestyle skiing, alpine skiing

Achievements and titles
- Highest world ranking: 1st in Ski Cross World Cup (2005, 2006, 2008, 2009); 1st in Freestyle Ski World Cup (2006)
Medal record
World Championships
Gold medal – first place	2005 Ruka	Ski Cross
Gold medal – first place	2007 Madonna di Campiglio	Ski Cross

Tomáš Kraus (born 3 March 1974) is a Czech sportsman who has specialized in both alpine skiing and freestyle skiing. His best results as an alpine skier was two 28th places at the 1997 and 2003 World Championships, but as a freestyle skier he is a double world champion and has 15 victories in World Cup races in the skicross discipline.

== Personal life ==
Kraus was born on 3 March 1974 in Děčín.

== Freestyle skiing ==
Before retiring as an alpine skier, Kraus had already taken up ski cross. He made his World Cup debut in November 2002 in Tignes, and won that race, but only competed in two more races that season. He opened the 2003–04 season with an eighth place in Saas-Fee, and recorded a fourth place from Pozza di Fassa in January as his best result. In the 2004–05 season he competed in six World Cup races, winning three of them; in Les Contamines, Pozza di Fassa and Kreischberg. At the end of the season he won the gold medal at the 2005 World Championships in Ruka.

Kraus opened the 2005–06 season with a victory in Les Contamines, and followed up with victories in Kreischberg and Sierra Nevada. His worst result that season was a fourth place. He continued his form in the 2006–07 season. Albeit only competing three times, with two second places and one third place, he won another gold medal at the 2007 World Championships in Madonna di Campiglio. In 2007–08 he won four out of his first five races, his worst result being a fifth place. In 2008–09 he opened with two fifth places, but then won the race in Flaine in January.

Kraus represents the sports club USK Praha. He has used Fischer skis during his freestyle career, and Dynastar during his alpine career.
