= Frances Gertrude Kumm =

Australian philanthropist (1886–1966)

Frances Gertrude Kumm OBE
- Born: Frances Gertrude Cato; 8 April 1886; Hawthorne, Victoria, Australia
- Died: 4 June 1966 (aged 80); East Melbourne, Victoria, Australia
- Occupation(s): philanthropist, women's activist
- Known for: assisting refugees, leadership in Victoria National Council of Women

Frances Gertrude Kumm OBE (8 April 1886 – 4 June 1966) was an Australian women's rights activist and philanthropist. She served leadership roles in the World YWCA, the Australian YWCA, the Australian Red Cross and the Victoria National Council of Women. She was particularly active in responding to the needs of refugees after World War II, and was a member of the Commonwealth Immigration Advisory Council. She was made an Officer of the Order of the British Empire in 1948.

== Early years ==
Kumm was born Frances Gertrude Cato on 8 April 1886, in Collingwood, Victoria, Australia. The eldest of eight children, her father was Frederick John Cato, a successful merchant, and Frances Bethune, of New Zealand. Cato built a grocery empire, and settled his family in Toorak when Gertrude was two. Her father was very active in the Wesleyan Church. Kumm was educated at home as a child, and then attended the Methodist Ladies' College.

In 1911, she met Dr. Hermann Karl William Kumm, a missionary who knew her father and stayed with her family for a time. Hermann Kumm was born in Prussia, but was later based in England. He was a fellow of the Royal Geographical Society, and had traveled extensively in Africa. He was a widower, his wife having died in 1906, leaving him with two young sons. The couple married in Australia on 12 January 1912, and then travelled to Hawaii for their honeymoon. They settled in England, where Herman Kumm continued working for the Sudan United Mission. With the start of World War I, they moved to New Jersey, in the United States. While living in the States, Kumm gave birth to two children, John and Lucy.

== Charitable work ==
After her husband's death in 1930, Kumm returned to Australia with her children. In 1934, tragedy struck again when her daughter Lucy, a diabetic, died.

In the following years, Kumm became extremely active in charitable causes, often serving in leadership roles for the organizations she supported. She was president of the Women's Hospital in Melbourne from 1938 to 1942. She was the national president of the YWCA from 1945 to 1950. She then served as vice-president representing the South Pacific Area for the World YWCA from 1951 to 1955. She also served as president of the Victoria National Council of Women and later the Australian National Council of Women. A diabetic herself, she served as president of the Victorian Diabetic Association from 1953 to 1957. She was also very active with the Australian Red Cross.

Kumm served on the Commonwealth Immigration Advisory Council from 1952 to 1961, and assisted post-war refugees to settle in Australia. She established the Kumm Award for Citizenship, given to new immigrants to Australia. It was discontinued after her death.

== Honours ==
On 10 June 1948, as part of the 1948 Birthday Honours, Kumm was appointed an Officer of the British Empire. She was recognised for her work as president of the Victoria National Council of Women.

== Death and legacy ==
Gertrude Kumm died on 4 June 1966 in Yarra, Melbourne, Victoria, and was cremated.

A street in the Canberra suburb Cook is named for Kumm. There is also a wing of the Royal Women's Hospital, Carlton, named in her honour. The Y.W.C.A.'s Cato Conference Centre in Melbourne commemorates the work of Kumm, her sister Una and their mother, Frances.
