= Taku Nakanishi =

Japanese freestyle skier (born 1972)

Personal information
- Nationality: Japanese
- Born: 26 February 1972 (age 53); Suita, Japan

Sport
- Sport: Freestyle skiing

Taku Nakanishi (中西 拓, Nakanishi Taku, born 26 February 1972) is a Japanese freestyle skier. He competed in the men's aerials event at the 2002 Winter Olympics.
