= Methodist Ladies' College, Melbourne =

Location
- 207 Barkers Road; Kew, Victoria, 3101; Australia; 37°48′49″S 145°2′19″E

Information
- Type: private school, single-sex, day and boarding school
- Motto: Latin: Deo Domuique ("For God and for Home")
- Denomination: Non-denominational
- Established: 1882; 144 years ago
- Principal: Julia Shea
- Gender: Girls
- Enrolment: ~2,200 (ELC–12)
- Colours: Green & silver
- Affiliation: Girls Sport Victoria
- Alumnae: MLC Old Collegians
- Website: mlc.vic.edu.au

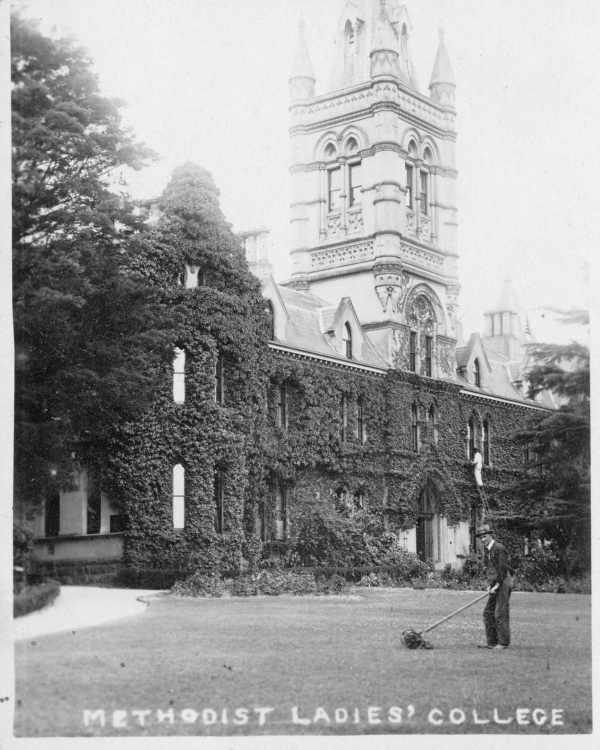
Methodist Ladies' College, c. 1930

Methodist Ladies' College (commonly referred to as MLC) is a non-selective, non-denominational private day and boarding school for girls, located in Kew, an eastern suburb of Melbourne, Victoria, Australia. The school has two additional outdoor education campuses known as "Marshmead" and "Banksia".

Established in 1882 on its current campus by the Methodist Church of Australasia, MLC caters for approximately 2000 students from the Early Learning Centre (MLC Kindle) to Year 12, including more than 100 boarders.

The college is a member of Girls Sport Victoria, the Australian Boarding Schools' Association, the Junior School Heads Association of Australia (JSHAA), the Association of Heads of Independent Schools of Australia (AHISA), and the Alliance of Girls' Schools Australasia.

MLC offers students both the Victorian Certificate of Education and the International Baccalaureate.

== History ==
William Henry Fitchett was secretary of a committee formed in 1879 to start a secondary school for girls. MLC was founded on its current campus in Kew on 14 February 1882 as a modern school of the first order, with buildings that formed a collegiate institution for girls unsurpassed in the colonies. It was the first Australian girls' school established by the Wesleyan Methodists and Fitchett was the first principal. The goal of its founders was to provide a high-class Christian education for girls, comparable with that provided elsewhere for boys. As the first Australian girls' school established by the Wesleyan Methodists, MLC attracted boarders from all Australian colonies.

In 1990, MLC became the first school in the world to introduce laptop computers for all students from Year 5 to Year 12. In 1991, MLC Marshmead opened, providing Year 9 students with an eight-week residential experience with a focus on outdoor education.

In 2001, The Sun-Herald reported a 1988 study which ranked MLC third in Australia's top ten girls' schools, based on the number of its alumni mentioned in the Who's Who in Australia (a listing of notable Australians).^{[a]} In 2002, MLC won the title of 'Australian School of the Year', as published in The Australian newspaper.

== Principals ==
There have been a total of nine principals, or formerly headmasters, of MLC since the school was founded in 1882.

| Period | Principal |
|---|---|
| 1882–1928 | Rev. Dr William H. Fitchett |
| 1929–1938 | Rev. John W. Grove |
| 1939–1966 | Rev. Dr Harold A. Wood, OBE |
| 1967–1978 | Rev. Ron A.W. Woodgate |
| 1979–1996 | David Loader |
| 1997–2012 | Rosa Storelli |
| 2012–2013 | Debbie Dunwoody |
| 2014–2022 | Diana Vernon |
| 2023–present | Julia Shea |

== House system ==
As with most Australian schools, MLC has a house system through which students partake in inter-house competitions and activities. The college currently has five houses:

- Berry – Colour: Purple, Mascot: Turtle.
- Cato – Colour: Blue, Mascot: Bear.
- Fitchett – Colour: Yellow, Mascot: Lion
- Krome – Colour: Green, Mascot: Frog
- Nevile – Colour: Pink, Mascot: Pink Panther

In the past, there was a Tiddeman house (colour red), which was specifically for boarders.

== Curriculum ==
MLC offers a range of VCE and Vocational Education Training (VET) courses, as well as the IB Diploma Programme. It has one of the largest VCE subject selections in the state. The school's success with the IB Programme is internationally renowned, with students achieving in the top global percentile each year. Its physical education program includes summer and winter sports. It participates in the Girls Sport Victoria competition.

The music school has an auditorium, and a department for woodwind, strings, keyboard, percussion and brass, with ensembles including a concert orchestra, senior strings, choirs and bands. The music school is known for its excellence.

The school offers a speech and drama program from early years and theatre arts and drama at VCE level, as well as studio arts subjects.

== Sport ==
MLC is a member of Girls Sport Victoria (GSV).

=== GSV premierships ===
MLC has won the following GSV premierships.

In 2024, MLC won all 4 x GSV Carnival Premierships for Athletics, Cross Country, Diving & Swimming (the only GSV school to do so). And, won 25 x GSV weekly sport Premierships.

- Athletics (5) - 2010, 2023, 2024, 2025, 2026
- Badminton (4) – 2011, 2016, 2024, 2026
- Basketball (8) – 2004, 2005, 2007, 2011, 2017, 2019, 2022, 2026
- Cricket (4) – 2008, 2010, 2015, 2017
- Cross Country - 2024
- Diving (6) – 2001, 2002, 2022, 2023, 2024, 2026
- Football (8) – 2011, 2012, 2013, 2014, 2015, 2016, 2018, 2019
- Hockey (11) – 2001, 2004, 2009, 2010, 2012, 2013, 2015, 2016, 2017, 2018, 2019
- Indoor Cricket (2) – 2009, 2010
- Netball – 2002
- Soccer – 2005, 2025
- Softball (3) – 2001, 2008, 2009
- Swimming (25) – 2001, 2002, 2003, 2004, 2005, 2006, 2007, 2008, 2009, 2010, 2011, 2012, 2014, 2015, 2016, 2017, 2018, 2019, 2020, 2022, 2023, 2024, 2025, 2026
- Tennis (6) – 2005, 2006, 2010, 2018, 2025, 2026
- Volleyball (7) – 2012, 2013, 2014, 2015, 2019, 2025, 2026
- Water Polo (5) – 2016, 2017, 2018, 2024, 2025

== Indigenous programmes ==
MLC has worked with the Yalari scholarship programme to support Indigenous girls from regional, rural and remote communities to study and board at MLC. Yalari is a not-for-profit organisation that offers secondary education scholarships at leading Australian boarding schools. MLC includes Indigenous issues in its mainstream curriculum, maintains a student Aboriginal Reconciliation Committee, grows an Indigenous garden, and appoints a senior Year 12 prefect to an Indigenous portfolio. MLC holds annual sporting and cultural exchanges with Worowa Aboriginal College at Healesville, Victoria.

== Notable alumnae ==
MLC Old Collegians Club Logo

Alumnae of the Methodist Ladies' College are known as 'Old Collegians' and automatically become members of the 'MLC Old Collegians' Club' upon graduation. The club was established on 29 October 1904 for the purpose of providing an ongoing relationship between the college and its alumnae.

Some notable "Old Collegians" include:

Entertainment, media and the arts

- Alice Marian Ellen Bale – artist
- Katie Bender Wynn – filmmaker
- Cate Blanchett, AC – Academy Award-winning actress, director, (also attended Ivanhoe Girls' Grammar School)
- Zoe Caldwell, OBE – Tony Award-winning actress
- Margaret Dredge – painter and printmaker
- Roma Egan – child TV actress, ballet dancer and teacher
- (Ada) Lorna Forbes – actress
- Deborra-Lee Furness – actress
- Marzena Godecki – actress
- Libbi Gorr – entertainer (also once commonly known as "Elle McFeast" working as a comedian on the major media network the Australian Broadcasting Corporation)
- Tessa James – actress
- Olivia Junkeer- actress
- Nene King − magazine publisher, former editor and editor-in-chief of Women's Weekly and Woman's Day
- Karen Knowles – singer, producer and director
- Joyce Nicholson – author, political philanthropist
- Bambi Northwood-Blythe - model
- Yumi Stynes – television presenter (also attended Melbourne Girls' Grammar School)
- Dora Lynnell Wilson – artist
- Elizabeth Wood-Ellem – editor and biographer

Medicine and science

- Marie Elizabeth Amy Castilla - pioneer doctor
- Isabel Clifton Cookson – botanist and palaeobotanist
- Mary Clementina De Garis – obstetrician, second woman in Victoria to take out a Doctorate of Medicine
- Hilda Estelle Kincaid – medical practitioner
- Adrienne Clarke AC – botanist, Chancellor of La Trobe University, Lieutenant Governor of Victoria
- Lorna Verdun Sisely OBE (1916–2004), Surgeon, and founder of the Monash Medical Centre Breast Clinic.

Politics and the law

- Millie Peacock – first woman elected to the Parliament of Victoria
- Nicola Roxon – Labor, federal Minister for Health, Attorney-General of Australia
- Fiona Richardson – State Labor Minister for Northcote, Minister for women and Minister for the Prevention of Family Violence
- Mary Wooldridge – State Liberal member for Doncaster, Minister for Mental Health, Minister for Women's Affairs and Minister for Community Services, 2010–14
- Judith Troeth – Liberal Senator for Victoria
- Lara Giddings – Labor Premier of Tasmania
- Julia Riley – barrister, cellist

Sport

- Alisa Camplin – aerial skier, Winter Olympiad gold medallist
- Lydia Ierodiaconou – aerial skier, Winter Olympiad gold medallist
- Marina Cade – lightweight rower (world champion)
- Rebecca Adam – sports administrator (President of the International Committee of Sports for the Deaf)
- Elizabeth Patrick – rowing coxswain (national champion, world champion and a dual Olympian)
- Meg Hutchins – AFLW footballer
- Mimi Hill – AFLW
- Daisy Bateman – AFLW
- Annabel Sutherland – Cricketer

Other

- Frances Gertrude Kumm (8 April 1886 – 4 June 1966) – women's activist and philanthropist
- Janet McCalman AC – social historian at University of Melbourne
- Jessie Vasey – founder, War Widows' Guild of Australia (also attended Lauriston Girls' School)
- List of people on the postage stamps of Australia – Cate Blanchett, Lydia Ierodiaconou, Alisa Camplin

== Controversy ==
In September 2012 the school board sacked the then principal of 15 years, Rosa Storelli, leading to calls by Storelli plus many parents and Old Collegians for the board's dismissal. There were also protests outside the school by parents and students. The action by the board was made possible by changes to the school's constitution. This became a cautionary tale for other independent schools in Australia about the relationship between principals and the boards of those schools and the power-sharing relationships among the various stakeholders. Rosa Storelli subsequently joined La Trobe University as an adjunct professor.

== See also ==
- List of schools in Victoria
- List of high schools in Victoria

== Notes ==
- Who's Who of girls' school rankings: 1.PLC Melbourne, 2.SCEGGS Darlinghurst, 3.MLC Melbourne, 4.PLC Sydney, 5.Melbourne Girls Grammar School, 6.Mac.Robertson Girls' High School, 7.North Sydney Girls High School, 8.Sydney Girls High School, 9.MLC Sydney, 10.University High School, Melbourne
