= Brian Currutt =

American freestyle skier

Personal information
- Born: April 11, 1974 (age 52) Cleveland, Ohio, United States

Sport
- Sport: Freestyle skiing

Brian Currutt (born April 11, 1974) is an American freestyle skier. He competed in the men's aerials event at the 2002 Winter Olympics.
