= The Lost Thing =

2000 picture book by Shaun Tan

- Book cover
- Author: Shaun Tan
- Illustrator: Shaun Tan
- Language: English
- Publisher: Lothian Books
- Publication date: 2000
- Publication place: Australia
- Media type: Print
- Pages: 32
- ISBN: 978-0-7344-1138-9
- OCLC: 61677652
- Dewey Decimal: A823.3
- Website: https://www.shauntan.net/the-lost-thing-book

The Lost Thing (2000) is a picture book written and illustrated by Shaun Tan that was also adapted into an Academy Award-winning animated short film.

== Plot ==
Set in a dystopian Melbourne, Australia, in the near future, The Lost Thing is a story about Shaun who enjoys collecting bottle tops for his bottle top collection. One day, while collecting bottle tops near a beach, he discovers a strange creature, that seems to be a combination of a crab, an octopus, and an industrial boiler. This creature is referred to as "The Lost Thing" by the narrator.

Shaun realizes the creature is lost and out of place in the city. He attempts to find its owner or otherwise its source but is not able to, due to the indifference of everyone else. Pete, an opinionated friend of Shaun's, explains that it may not actually belong anywhere. When he seeks help from a government agency, he is met by a creature who warns that the department exists only to hide and forget about uncategorizable things, and gives him a business card with an arrowhead sign on it. After searching much of the city for the sign, which they find and follow numerous times, Shaun discovers a utopian land for lost things, where he parts ways with the creature, and continues on with his life - although he was unable to say whether the creature, or any of the others, really belonged there.

== 2010 film ==
This book was adapted into a 15-minute animated short film in 2010, directed by Shaun Tan and Andrew Ruhemann and narrated by Tim Minchin. It won the Oscar for Best Animated Short. It was nominated for the 2011 Hugo Award for Best Dramatic Presentation, Short Form.

The film was produced by Sophie Byrne with Passion Pictures Australia and animated by two primary artists; CG lead Tom Bryant and animator and editor Leo Baker. Tom Bryant was located in Scotland, whilst Leo Baker worked from Melbourne. The film was in development for some years, but took three years of full-time production to complete between 2007 and 2010.
