= Kai Ozaki =

Japanese freestyle skier (born 1987)

Personal information
- Born: July 30, 1987 (age 38) Fujisawa, Kanagawa, Japan
- Height: 1.65 m (5 ft 5 in)

Sport
- Sport: Skiing
- Updated on March 2, 2013

Kai Ozaki (尾崎 快, Ozaki Kai; born July 30, 1987 in Fujisawa, Kanagawa) is a Japanese freestyle skier, specializing in moguls.

Ozaki competed at the 2006 and 2010 Winter Olympics for Japan. His best finish was in 2010, finishing 24th in the preliminary round of the moguls event. In 2006, he finished 30th.

As of February 2013, his best showing at the World Championships came in 2009, where he finished 16th in the moguls event.

Ozaki made his World Cup debut in February 2004. As of February 2013, he has made a World Cup podium once, winning silver at Inawashiro in 2005/06. His best World Cup overall finish is 13th, in 2005/06.

== World Cup podiums ==
Date	Location	Rank	Event
March 5, 2006	Inawashiro	2nd place, silver medalist(s)	Moguls
