= Nils Lauper =

Swiss freestyle skier

Personal information
- Born: 12 October 1982 (age 43) Seedorf, Switzerland

Sport
- Sport: Skiing

World Cup career
- Indiv. podiums: 3

Nils Lauper (born 12 October 1982 in Seedorf, Switzerland) is a Swiss freestyle skier, specializing in halfpipe.

Lauper competed at the 2014 Winter Olympics for Switzerland. He placed 16th in the qualifying round in the halfpipe, failing to advance.

As of April 2014, his best showing at the World Championships is 10th, in the 2011 halfpipe.

Lauper made his World Cup debut in November 2003. As of April 2014, he has three World Cup podium finishes, with his best a silver at Les Contamines in 2008–09. His best World Cup overall finish in the halfpipe is 3rd, in 2008–09.

== World Cup podiums ==
Date	Location	Rank	Event
11 January 2009	Les Contamines	2nd place, silver medalist(s)	Halfpipe
19 March 2009	La Plagne	3rd place, bronze medalist(s)	Halfpipe
21 January 2011	Kreischberg	3rd place, bronze medalist(s)	Halfpipe
