= Kayo Henmi =

Japanese freestyle skier (born 1979)

Personal information
- Born: 12 June 1979 (age 45); Isawa, Yamanashi, Japan

Sport
- Country: Japan
- Sport: Freestyle skiing

Kayo Henmi (born 12 June 1979) is a Japanese freestyle skier.

She was born in Isawa, Yamanashi. She competed at the 2006 Winter Olympics, in women's aerials.
