= Brenda Petzold =

American freestyle skier

Personal information
- Born: August 6, 1973 (age 51); Lawrence, Massachusetts, U.S.

Sport
- Country: United States
- Sport: Freestyle skiing

Brenda Petzold (born August 6, 1973) is an American freestyle skier. She was born in Lawrence, Massachusetts. She competed at the 2002 Winter Olympics in Salt Lake City, in women's aerials.
