= Christian Kaufmann (skier) =

Swiss freestyle skier

Personal information
- Nationality: Swiss
- Born: 9 September 1976 (age 48); Waiden, Austria

Sport
- Sport: Freestyle skiing

Christian Kaufmann (born 9 September 1976) is a Swiss freestyle skier. He competed in the men's aerials event at the 2002 Winter Olympics.
