= Sarah Ainsworth =

British freestyle skier (born 1985)

Personal information
- Born: 6 July 1985 (age 39); Chelmsford, Essex, Great Britain
- Height: 5 ft 6 in (1.68 m)
- Weight: 134 lb (61 kg)

Sport
- Country: United Kingdom
- Sport: Freestyle Skiing

Sarah Catherine Ainsworth (born 6 July 1985 in Chelmsford, Essex) is a British freestyle skier who has competed since 2007. Her best World Cup finish was 12th in an aerials event at Davos, Switzerland in 2007.

Ainsworth does have a career best fourth-place finish at the Meiringen-Haslisberg Europa Cup event in 2008.

Ainsworth's best FIS Freestyle World Ski Championships result was 22nd in Inawashiro, Japan.

She made her Olympic debut at the Women's Aerials event on 20 February 2010 where she finished 22nd.
