= Alta High School (Utah) =

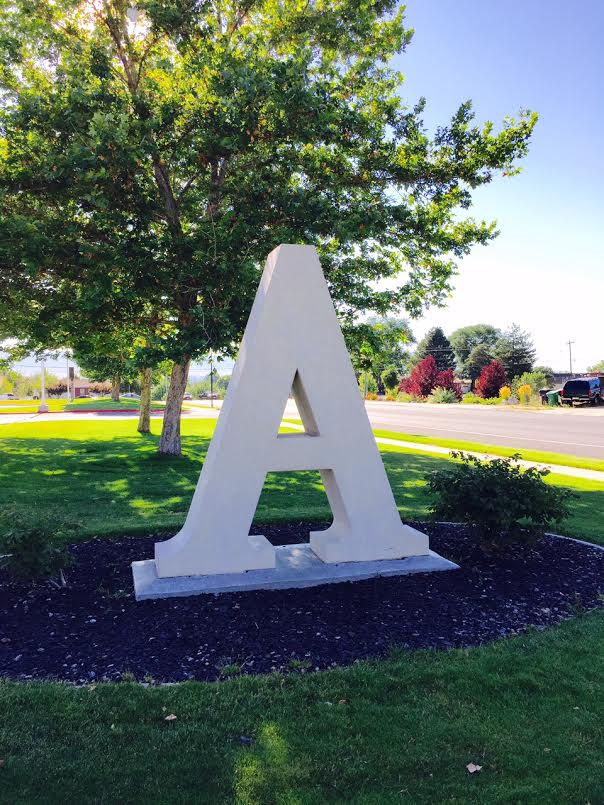

Location
- 11055 S. 1000 E. Sandy, UT 84094; 40°33′00″N 111°51′40″W

Information
- Type: Public
- Established: 1978
- School district: Canyons School District
- Principal: Kenneth Rowley
- Staff: 92.85 (FTE)
- Grades: 9–12
- Enrollment: 2,278 (2024-2025)
- Student to teacher ratio: 24.53
- Colors: Black and silver
- Athletics: Football, basketball, soccer, swimming, tennis, baseball, softball
- Mascot: Hawk
- Website: Official website

Alta High School is a secondary school in Sandy, Utah, United States which services students from the cities of Sandy and Draper. Founded in 1978, it is part of the Canyons School District.

== History ==
The school opened in 1978. The modern, two-level brick building is situated on a 37-acre (150,000 m^{2}) site with an unobstructed view of both Oquirrh Mountain and Wasatch ranges.

School is in session for 180 days per year on a traditional 9-month calendar. Students attend four 84-minute classes each day on an alternating block schedule, beginning at 7:45 am and ending at 2:25 pm. The school operates a quarterly schedule.

In November 2017 voters passed a bond that allowed Canyons School District to renovate several of their buildings, including Alta High School. The three-phase project will make the school more energy efficient and let in more natural sunlight as well as structural strengthening and aesthetic design improvements. The plans were designed by Salt Lake City based VCBO Architecture which oversaw a smaller renovation in 2014. The latter project's first phase was started with a groundbreaking on June 7, 2018. The first phase will include a new auditorium, updated electronic marquis replacing an electric light board, new north parking lot, new bus loading area, and a new greenhouse. An open house was held at the school for the general public on April 25, 2018 to review tentative construction schedules and introduce architectural renderings.

== Athletics ==
The Alta Hawks football team won state championships in 1983, 1988, 2007, and 2008. Alta's boys' basketball team won the Utah State Championship in 1992, 1995, 2003, 2010, and 2023. Alta's girls' soccer team was ranked second in the nation in 2006, and is coached by Lee Mitchell, who was named national coach of the year. The team won state championships in 1999, 2002, 2004, 2006, 2007, 2008, 2009, and 2010. The wrestling team won the 4A state championship in 1990. The Lady Hawks tennis team won back-to-back state championships in 2007 and 2008. The boys' cross country team won a state championship in 2008. Alta's women's basketball team took the 5A State Championship in 2002 and 2011. Alta's women's Track & Field team took the 5A State championship in 2003.

Alta also offers football, golf, tennis, cross country, soccer, dance company, volleyball, debate, ballroom, drill team, cheerleading, basketball, wrestling, swimming, diving, hockey, baseball, softball, track and field, lacrosse, rugby union, ultimate, bowling, and other athletic clubs.

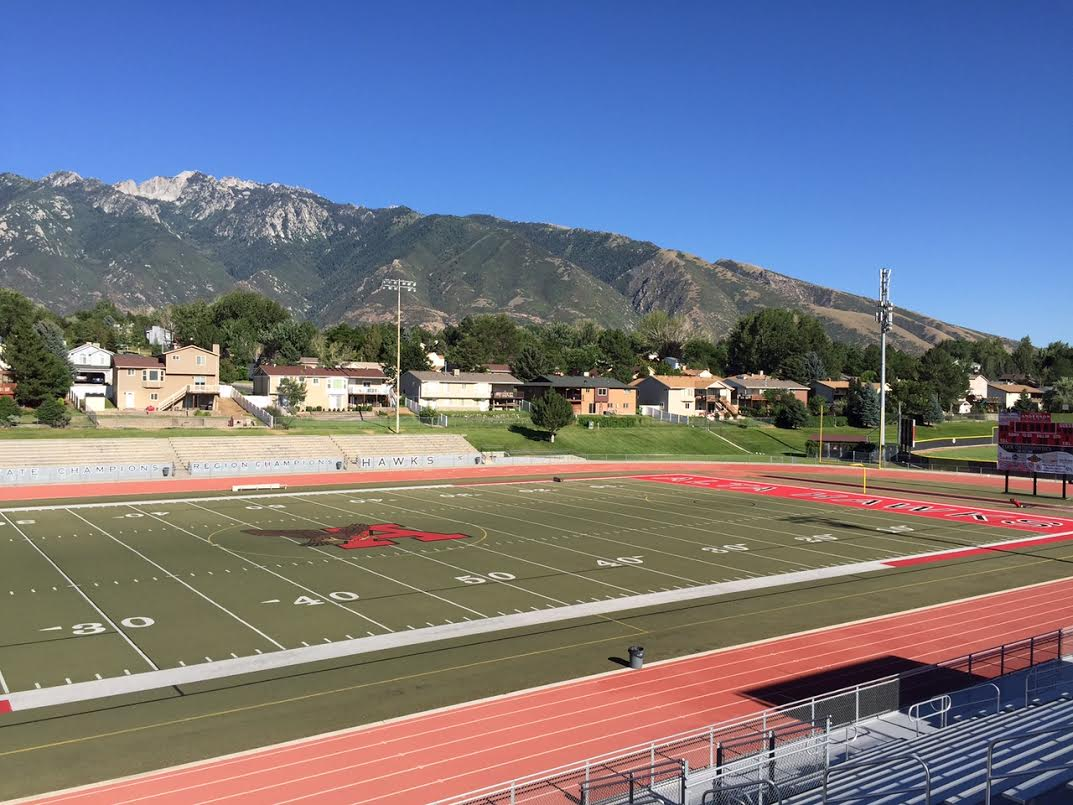
Alta's football field

== Performing arts ==
Alta High School has an award-winning performing arts program. The Theatre Department won the 5A State Championship in 2012 and in 2013. Alta's jazz band has consistently received high markings in state competitions. As part of the 2017 voter-approved bond, a new Performing Arts Center will replace the current auditorium. It is taller, not within the center of the building, and has twice as much seating as the former space. It is scheduled to open in March, 2020.

== Clubs ==
Alta offers Key Club, the largest international student leadership organization in the world. Alta also offers Art, Anime, Ultimate Frisbee, Polynesian, Latinos in Action, Improv, Drama, Nintendo, TableTop Gaming, Chess, Robotics, Medieval, and Hacker clubs.

== Notable alumni ==
- Robert Adamson – actor
- Ryon Bingham – retired NFL player; played for the San Diego Chargers from 2004 to 2010
- Kirby Heyborne – actor
- Julianne Hough – dancer, singer, actress and television personality; two-time winner of Dancing with the Stars; star of Safe Haven
- Travis Knight – member of the UConn Basketball All Century Team.; retired NBA player; won an NBA World Championship as a member of the Los Angeles Lakers in 2000
- Frank Maile - assistant head football coach Boise State University
- Erin Mendenhall - politician and activist; incumbent mayor of Salt Lake City
- Brecken Mozingo – professional soccer player; currently plays for the National Women's Soccer League team Utah Royals
- Lacy Schnoor – aerial skier; 2010 Winter Olympian
- Heather Stainbrook – professional soccer player; currently plays for the National Women's Soccer League team Washington Spirit
- Michele Vasconcelos – retired professional soccer player; played for the National Women's Soccer League team Utah Royals
- Kealia Watt – retired professional soccer player; member of the United States 2012 FIFA U-20 Women's World Cup-winning team; last played for the National Women's Soccer League team Chicago Red Stars
