= Olga Koroleva =

Russian freestyle skier (born 1979)

Olga Yuryevna Koroleva (Russian: Ольга Юрьевна Королëва, born 30 April 1979) is a former Russian freestyle skier.

Koroleva finished 4th in Aerial skiing at the 2002 Winter Olympics.
