= Kyle Nissen =

Canadian freestyle skier (born 1979)

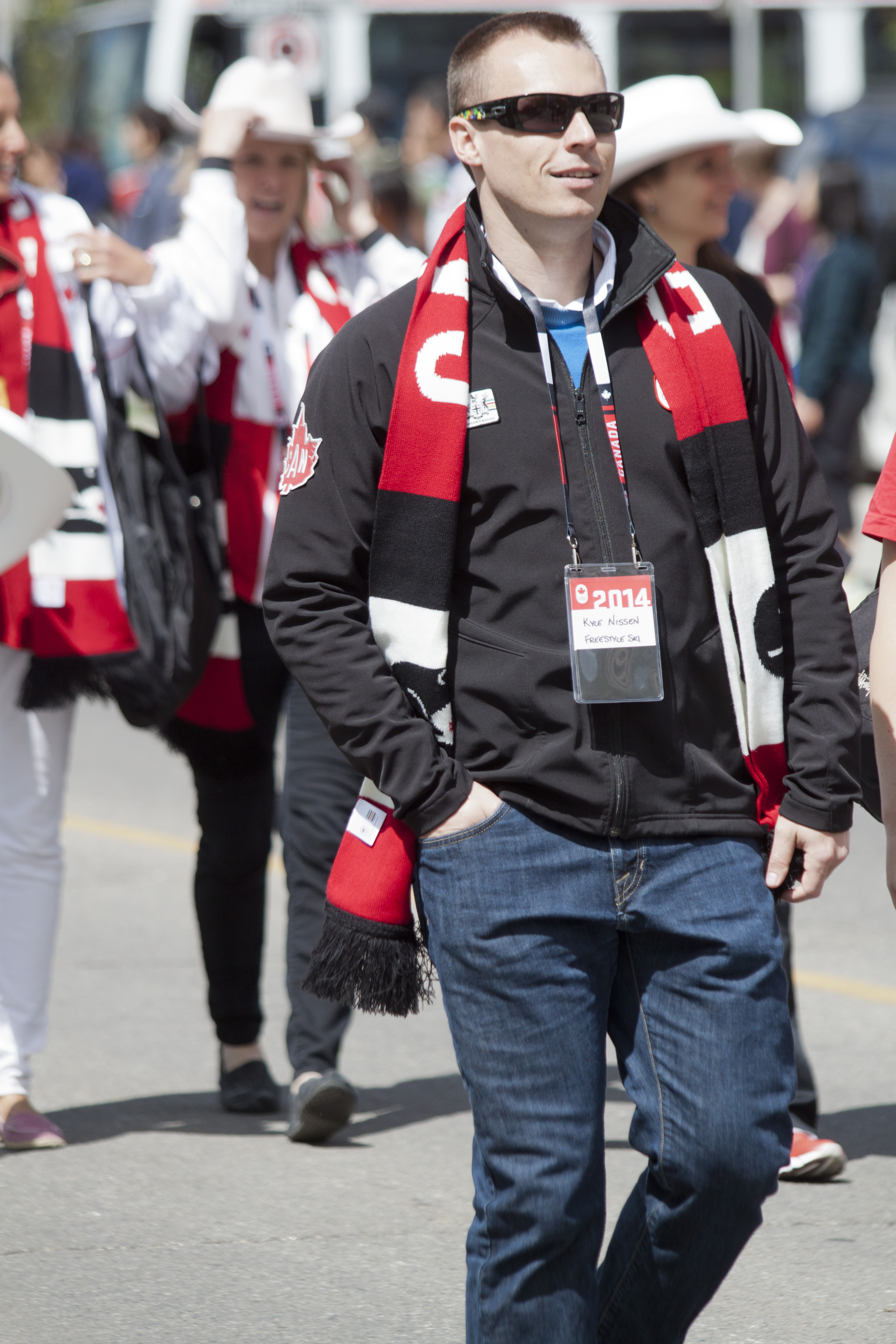
- Nissen in Parade of Champions in Calgary (2014)

Personal information
- Born: August 23, 1979 (age 46) Calgary, Alberta, Canada

Sport
- Country: Canada
- Sport: freestyle skiing

Kyle Nissen (born August 23, 1979) is a Canadian freestyle skier.

Born in Calgary, Alberta, Nissen competes in aerials, and made his World Cup debut in December 1999. He made his first World Cup podium later that season, winning an event in Heavenly, California.

Nissen has won one other World Cup event, at Mont Gabriel in 2006, and has placed on the podium at 10 other events. His most successful season came in 2006, when he placed 2nd overall in the World Cup standings, behind Dmitri Dashinski. Nissen's best showing at the World Championships came in 2005, when he finished 5th, also behind Dashinski.

Nissen also competed in the 2006 Winter Olympics in Turin, qualifying for the aerials final 7th place. In the final, he was 9th after the first jump, but moved up to 5th after scoring the most points in the competition on the second jump.

At the 2010 Winter Olympics in Vancouver, Nissen finished 9th in the qualification with 233.71 points after two jumps and qualified for the finals In jump 1 of the finals, he scored 126.92 points and led the second place competitor Aleksei Grishin of Belarus by 6.34 points. However, in jump 2, Nissen performed poorly and scored only 112.39 points, second-last from the 12 competitors in the finals. Nissen finished with an overall result of fifth place.

== World Cup podiums ==
| Date | Location | Rank |
| January 23, 2000 | Heavenly | 1st place, gold medalist(s) |
| September 8, 2001 | Mount Buller | 2nd place, silver medalist(s) |
| December 5, 2003 | Ruka | 2nd place, silver medalist(s) |
| February 19, 2005 | Sauze d'Oulx | 2nd place, silver medalist(s) |
| March 5, 2005 | Špindlerův Mlýn | 3rd place, bronze medalist(s) |
| September 3, 2005 | Mount Buller | 2nd place, silver medalist(s) |
| December 16, 2005 | Changchun | 3rd place, bronze medalist(s) |
| December 18, 2005 | Changchun | 2nd place, silver medalist(s) |
| January 8, 2006 | Mount Gabriel | 1st place, gold medalist(s) |
| January 14, 2006 | Deer Valley | 3rd place, bronze medalist(s) |
| February 25, 2007 | Apex | 2nd place, silver medalist(s) |
| January 18, 2009 | Lake Placid | 2nd place, silver medalist(s) |
