= Miyuki Hatanaka =

Japanese freestyle skier (born 1975)

Personal information
- Nationality: Japanese
- Born: 18 December 1975 (age 49); Miyagi, Japan

Sport
- Sport: Freestyle skiing

Miyuki Hatanaka (畑中 みゆき, Hatanaka Miyuki, born 18 December 1975) is a Japanese freestyle skier. She competed at the 2002 Winter Olympics and the 2006 Winter Olympics.
