= Jana Lindsey =

American freestyle skier

Jana Lindsey (born September 18, 1984, in Rapid City, South Dakota) is an American freestyle skier who has competed since 1999. Her best World Cup fourth was in an aerials event in China in 2009.

At the 2006 Winter Olympics in Turin, Lindsey finished 16th in the aerials event. Her best finish at the FIS Freestyle World Ski Championships was fifth in the aerials at Inawashiro in 2009. Lindsey competed for the US team at the 2010 Winter Olympics in January 2010, finishing 17th in the aerials event.

Lindsey is the second South Dakota native to make the US Winter Olympics Team. The first was ski jumper Scott Berry in 1972. She attended the University of Utah and currently resides in Park City, Utah.
