= Katie Bender (filmmaker) =

Australian filmmaker (born 1985)

Katie Bender Wynn
- Born: 5 October 1985 (age 41); Geelong, Victoria, Australia
- Occupations: Documentary filmmaker, director
- Years active: 2016–present
- Website: katiebenderwynn.com

Katie Bender Wynn (born 5 October 1985) is an Australian documentary filmmaker working across film and television. Her work focuses on sport and athlete-driven storytelling. She is known for directing The Will to Fly (2016), Matildas: The World at Our Feet (2023), and Taurasi (2025).

== Early life ==
Bender Wynn trained as a gymnast before transitioning to freestyle aerial skiing as part of the Australian national program. She attended Methodist Ladies’ College in Melbourne, where she trained at a high-performance gymnastics facility on campus. At the age of 16, she was recruited by the Olympic Winter Institute of Australia into a talent identification program designed to transition gymnasts into aerial skiing.

== Career ==
=== The Will to Fly ===
Bender Wynn made her directorial debut with the feature documentary The Will to Fly (2016), which follows Australian Olympic freestyle skier Lydia Lassila. Development on the film began in 2012 after Bender Wynn visited Lassila at a training camp in Utah.

The film documents Lassila’s return to competition following the birth of her first child and her preparation for the 2014 Winter Olympics in Sochi.

The Will to Fly premiered in Melbourne on 8 March 2016 and was subsequently released theatrically in Australia. The film received positive reviews from critics and was described by The Huffington Post Australia as “the most inspirational movie of the year”.

=== Matildas: The World at Our Feet ===
In 2023, Bender Wynn directed the Disney+ documentary series Matildas: The World at Our Feet.

The six-part series follows the Australia women’s national soccer team in the lead-up to the 2023 FIFA Women’s World Cup.

For her work on the series, Bender Wynn was nominated for the AACTA Award for Best Direction in Nonfiction Television.

=== Taurasi ===
In 2025, Bender Wynn directed Taurasi, a three-part documentary series about American professional basketball player Diana Taurasi. The series was produced by Skydance Sports, Meadowlark Media, and Institute Pictures, and released on Amazon Prime Video.

The series follows Taurasi’s career, including her early life in California, her collegiate career at the University of Connecticut, and her professional career in the Women’s National Basketball Association (WNBA), as well as her international playing career.

== Filmography ==
- The Will to Fly (2016) – director
- We Champion (2021) – director
- Matildas: The World at Our Feet (2023) – director
- Taurasi (2025) – director

== Awards and nominations ==
Matildas: The World at Our Feet
Year	Award	Category	Nominated work	Result
2024	AACTA Award	Best Documentary or Factual Program	Matildas: The World at Our Feet	Nominated
2024	AACTA Award	Best Direction in Nonfiction Television	Matildas: The World at Our Feet	Nominated
2024	Logie Awards	Best Factual and Documentary Program	Matildas: The World at Our Feet	Nominated

The Will to Fly
Year	Award	Category	Nominated work	Result
2016	Whistler Film Festival	Best World Documentary Award	The Will to Fly	Won
2016	Whistler Film Festival	Best Mountain Culture Film Award	The Will to Fly	Won
2016	Alliance of Women Film Journalists	EDA Award for Best Female-Directed Documentary	The Will to Fly	Nominated
2016	APRA AMCOS Awards Australia	APRA AMCOS award for Best Music in Documentary	The Will to Fly	Nominated
