= Jeff Bean =

Canadian freestyle skier

Personal information
- Born: January 11, 1977 (age 49) Ottawa, Ontario, Canada
Medal record
Representing Canada
Men's freestyle skiing
World Championships
| Silver medal – second place | 2005 Ruka | Aerials |

Jeff Bean (born January 11, 1977) is a Canadian freestyle skier.

Bean competes in aerials, and made his World Cup debut in January 1996, and made his first World Cup podium later that season, finishing third in Kirchberg. One year later, Kirchberg was the site of his first two career World Cup wins, as he won events on back-to-back days.

Over his career, Bean placed on the podium at 17 World Cup events, and claimed 4 titles over a 10-year span. His most successful season came in 2003, when he placed 3rd overall in the World Cup standings. His lone medal at the World Championships came in 2005, when he finished second behind countryman Steve Omischl.

Bean competed in three Olympic games, beginning in 1998 and ending in 2006. His best finish was 4th in 2002, missing out on a medal by only two-tenths of a point. He also made the final in 1998, but finished 11th out of 12 competitors. In 2006, he was well positioned to make the final after the first jump, but a poor second jump left him in 19th place.

Additionally, Bean competed on the television show "Mantracker" in season 2, episode 8. He and fellow Olympian Steve Omishl, completed a gruelling 42 km route on foot in the Ontario wilderness over 2 days to beat the star of the show, Terry Grant, and sidekick Phil Lemieux to the finish line.

== World Cup podiums ==
| Date | Location | Rank |
| February 2, 1996 | Kirchberg | 3rd place, bronze medalist(s) |
| December 7, 1996 | Tignes | 3rd place, bronze medalist(s) |
| February 19, 1997 | Kirchberg | 1st place, gold medalist(s) |
| February 20, 1997 | Kirchberg | 1st place, gold medalist(s) |
| August 2, 1997 | Mount Buller | 3rd place, bronze medalist(s) |
| January 6, 2001 | Deer Valley | 2nd place, silver medalist(s) |
| January 12, 2002 | Mont Tremblant | 2nd place, silver medalist(s) |
| January 27, 2002 | Whistler | 3rd place, bronze medalist(s) |
| September 7, 2002 | Mount Buller | 1st place, gold medalist(s) |
| January 12, 2003 | Mont Tremblant | 1st place, gold medalist(s) |
| January 19, 2003 | Lake Placid | 3rd place, bronze medalist(s) |
| March 3, 2003 | Špindlerův Mlýn | 2nd place, silver medalist(s) |
| January 14, 2005 | Lake Placid | 3rd place, bronze medalist(s) |
| January 16, 2005 | Lake Placid | 2nd place, silver medalist(s) |
| January 8, 2006 | Mount Gabriel | 2nd place, silver medalist(s) |
| January 21, 2006 | Lake Placid | 2nd place, silver medalist(s) |
| December 12, 2006 | Jilin | 3rd place, bronze medalist(s) |
