= Dmitry Rak =

Belarusian freestyle skier

Personal information
- Nationality: Belarusian
- Born: 21 June 1976 (age 49) Minsk, Belarus

Sport
- Sport: Freestyle skiing

Dmitry Rak (born 21 June 1976) is a Belarusian freestyle skier. He competed at the 2002 Winter Olympics and the 2006 Winter Olympics.
