= Manuela Müller =

Swiss freestyle skier (born 1980)

Personal information
- Born: 7 October 1980 (age 44); Thalwil, Switzerland

Sport
- Country: Switzerland
- Sport: Freestyle skiing

Manuela Müller (born 7 October 1980) is a Swiss freestyle skier. She was born in Thalwil. She competed at the 2002 Winter Olympics in Salt Lake City. She competed at the 2006 Winter Olympics in Turin, where she placed seventh in women's aerials.
