= Steve Omischl =

Canadian freestyle skier

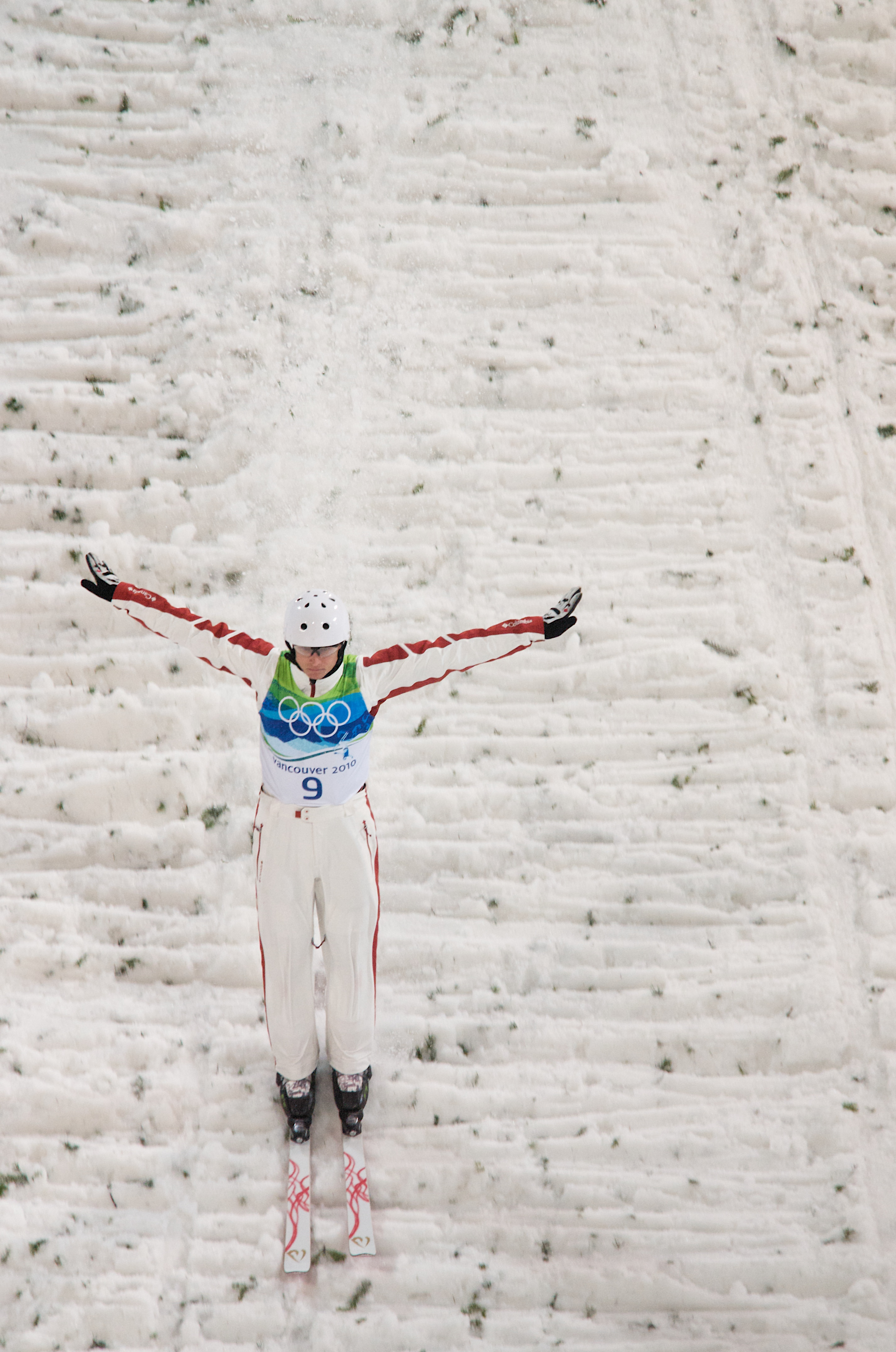
- Omischl competing at the 2010 Winter Olympics

Personal information
- Born: November 16, 1978 (age 47) North Bay, Ontario, Canada
Medal record
Men's freestyle skiing
Representing Canada
World Championships
Gold medal – first place	2005 Ruka	Aerials
Silver medal – second place	2009 Inawashiro	Aerials
Bronze medal – third place	2003 Deer Valley	Aerials
Bronze medal – third place	2007 Madonna di Campiglio	Aerials

Steve Omischl (born November 16, 1978) is a Canadian freestyle skier.

== Career ==
Omischl was born in North Bay, Ontario. He competes in aerials, and made his World Cup debut in December 1999, finishing with a silver medal at an event in Blackcomb. Omischl earned five more podiums on the World Cup circuit before winning his first event in mid-2002.

Along with a fellow olympian Jeff Bean, he participated in an episode of the hit show Mantracker where he defeated Terry Grant in the nerve-wracking chase.

Over his career, Omischl has placed on the podium at 40 World Cup events, and claimed 20 titles. He has won four overall World Cup titles, finishing atop the aerials standings in 2004, 2007, 2008 and 2009. He has won four medals at the World Championships. His lone gold came in 2005, and most recently won a silver medal in 2009.

Omischl has competed in three Olympic Games. In 2002, he placed 4th in the qualifying but ended up 11th in the final. In 2006, he was well positioned to make the final after the first jump, but a poor second jump left him in 20th place.

Omischl was also a member of the Canadian team at the 2010 Winter Olympics in Vancouver. He qualified for the final in 8th and was ranked 8th overall after the final.

== World Cup podiums ==
Date	Location	Rank
December 4, 1999	Blackcomb	2nd place, silver medalist(s)
February 26, 2000	Piancavallo	2nd place, silver medalist(s)
August 12, 2000	Mount Buller	3rd place, bronze medalist(s)
December 2, 2000	Blackcomb	3rd place, bronze medalist(s)
March 10, 2001	Himos	2nd place, silver medalist(s)
January 18, 2002	Lake Placid	3rd place, bronze medalist(s)
September 8, 2002	Mount Buller	1st place, gold medalist(s)
January 17, 2003	Lake Placid	2nd place, silver medalist(s)
February 7, 2003	Steamboat	3rd place, bronze medalist(s)
March 3, 2003	Špindlerův Mlýn	1st place, gold medalist(s)
September 6, 2003	Mount Buller	1st place, gold medalist(s)
September 7, 2003	Mount Buller	1st place, gold medalist(s)
January 16, 2004	Lake Placid	1st place, gold medalist(s)
January 18, 2004	Lake Placid	1st place, gold medalist(s)
January 25, 2004	Fernie	2nd place, silver medalist(s)
January 31, 2004	Deer Valley	2nd place, silver medalist(s)
February 15, 2004	Harbin	1st place, gold medalist(s)
February 28, 2004	Špindlerův Mlýn	2nd place, silver medalist(s)
March 10, 2004	Sauze d'Oulx	1st place, gold medalist(s)
January 16, 2005	Lake Placid	3rd place, bronze medalist(s)
January 28, 2005	Deer Valley	3rd place, bronze medalist(s)
February 5, 2005	Shenyang	2nd place, silver medalist(s)
February 12, 2005	Changchun	2nd place, silver medalist(s)
February 19, 2005	Sauze d'Oulx	1st place, gold medalist(s)
December 18, 2005	Changchun	3rd place, bronze medalist(s)
March 3, 2006	Davos	1st place, gold medalist(s)
December 10, 2006	Jilin	1st place, gold medalist(s)
January 11, 2007	Deer Valley	2nd place, silver medalist(s)
February 25, 2007	Apex	1st place, gold medalist(s)
December 21, 2007	Lianhua Mountain	1st place, gold medalist(s)
December 22, 2007	Lianhua Mountain	3rd place, bronze medalist(s)
January 19, 2008	Lake Placid	1st place, gold medalist(s)
January 27, 2008	Mont Tremblant	1st place, gold medalist(s)
February 10, 2008	Cypress Mountain	1st place, gold medalist(s)
February 17, 2008	Inawashiro	2nd place, silver medalist(s)
March 1, 2008	Moscow	1st place, gold medalist(s)
March 7, 2008	Davos	1st place, gold medalist(s)
January 25, 2009	Mount Gabriel	1st place, gold medalist(s)
January 30, 2009	Deer Valley	3rd place, bronze medalist(s)
February 2, 2009	Cypress Mountain	1st place, gold medalist(s)
