= Amber Peterson =

Canadian freestyle skier

Amber Peterson (born April 24, 1982) is a Canadian freestyle skier.

Peterson was born in Thunder Bay, Ontario. She competes in aerials, and made her World Cup debut in December 1999 at Blackcomb, British Columbia. Her first, and to date, only World Cup podium came at Lake Placid in January, 2006. Peterson has made, to date, 47 World Cup starts, and appeared at 3 World Championships

Peterson competed at the 2006 Winter Olympics, but did not advance from the qualifying round, ending up 15th overall.

== World Cup podiums ==
Date	Location	Rank
January 21, 2006	Salt Lake City	2nd place, silver medalist(s)
