= Stanley Hayer =

Canadian-Czech freestyle skier (born 1973)

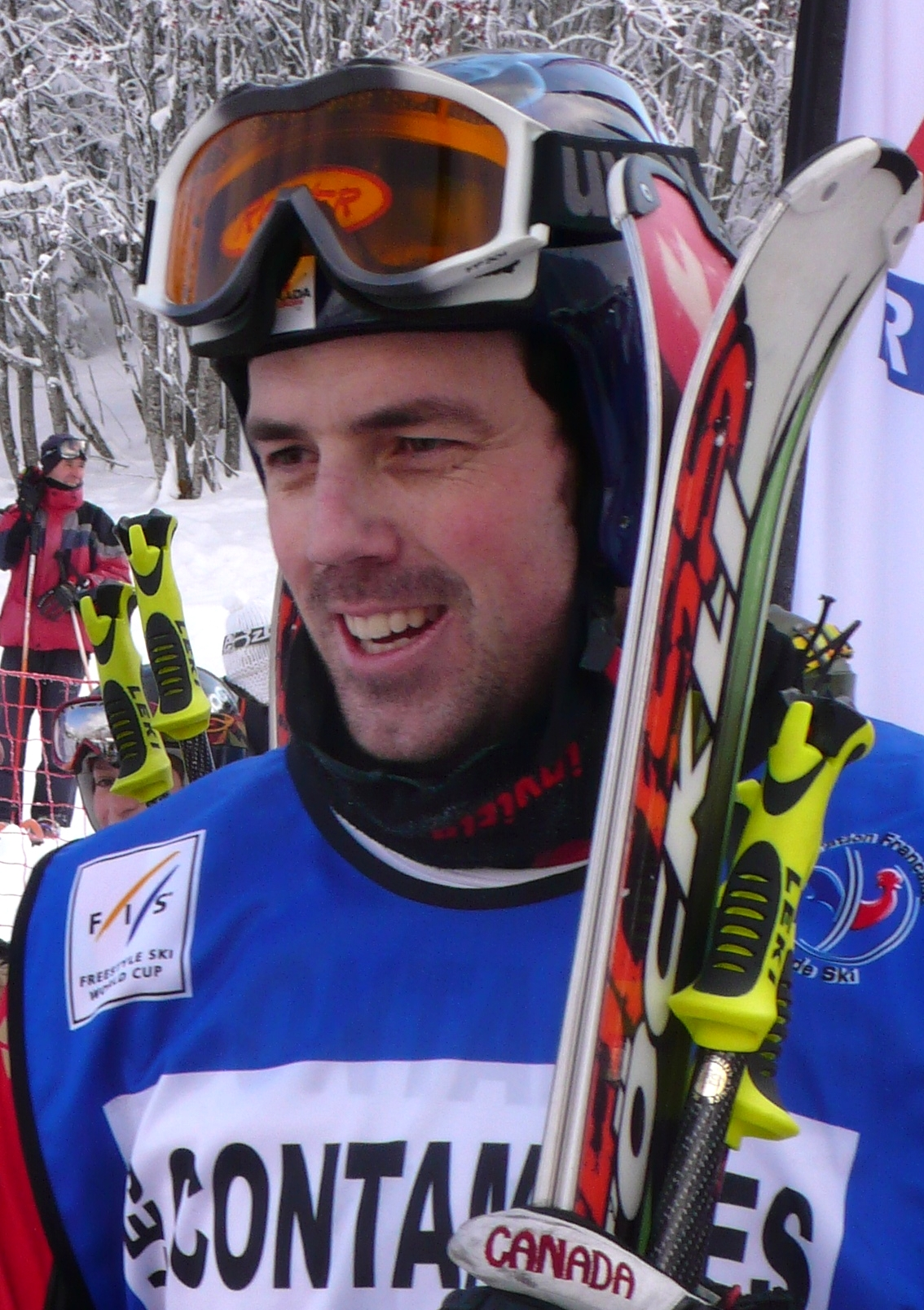

Personal information
- Born: July 19, 1973 (age 52) Edmonton, Alberta, Canada
- Height: 1.93 m (6 ft 4 in)
- Weight: 94.8 kg (209 lb; 14.93 st)

Sport
- Country: Canada
Medal record
Ski Cross
Representing Czech Republic
FIS Freestyle World Ski Championships
Silver medal – second place	2007 Madonna di Campiglio	Ski Cross
Men's Freestyle Skiing
Representing Canada
Winter X Games
Gold medal – first place	2009 Aspen	Ski Cross
Silver medal – second place	2008 Aspen	Ski Cross

Stanley Hayer (Czech: Stanislav Hujer; born July 19, 1973) is a Canadian-Czech former freestyle skier. He is a member of the Canadian national ski cross team.

Hayer moved over to the Czech Republic to ski with their team in the early part of the 2000s after disagreements with the Canadian National program. He would win a silver in the Czech nationals and go on to win a silver in the 2007 FIS World Championships. Hayer went back to the Canadian ski cross team for the start of the 2007–08 season with the 2010 Winter Olympics taking place in Canada.

Hayer won the gold medal at the 2009 Winter X-Games having won silver at the 2008 X-Games the year before.

Hayer was a member of the Canadian team going to the 2010 Winter Olympics in Vancouver. He was 10th in qualification and advanced to the elimination round. He finished second in his heat in the 1/8 round, and continued to the quarterfinals, where he finished last in his heat and was eliminated.

Hayer became the head coach of the Canadian ski cross team in 2015. In 2019, Hayer won a Petro-Canada Coaching Excellence Award.
