= Xavier Bertoni =

French Freestyle skier

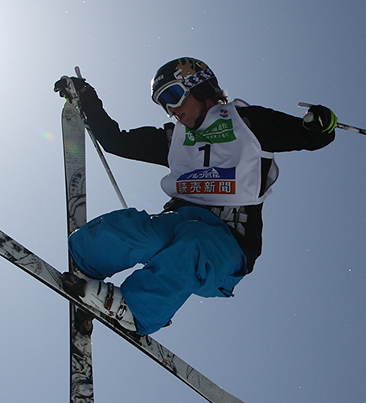
- Xavier Bertoni in 2009

Personal information
- Born: 4 May 1988 (age 38) La Clusaz, France
Medal record
Men's Freestyle Skiing
Representing France
FIS Freestyle World Ski Championships
Bronze medal – third place	2009 Inawashiro	Halfpipe
X Games
Gold medal – first place	2009 Aspen	Superpipe
Bronze medal – third place	2010 Aspen	Superpipe

Xavier Bertoni (born 4 May 1988 in La Clusaz) is a French Freestyle skier. He began skiing when he was two years old, and has been with Rossignol since 2004.

== Results ==
- 3rd 2010 14th X Games, Aspen, Colorado, Superpipe
- 1st 2009 13th X Games, Aspen, Colorado, Superpipe
- 1st 2009 fis World Cup Les Contamines, FRA Halfpipe
- 6th 2008 Tignes Airwaves Tignes, FRA Halfpipe
- 8th 2008 fis World Cup Les Contamines, FRA Halfpipe
- 1st 2007 NZ Freeski Open Lake Wanaka, NZL Halfpipe
- 3rd 2007 World Skiing Invitational Whistler, BC CAN Superpipe
- 4th 2007 Tignes Airwaves Tignes, FRA Big Air
