= Ryan St. Onge =

American freestyle skier

Personal information
- Born: February 7, 1983 (age 43) Hartford, Connecticut, U.S.
- Height: 5 ft 9 in (1.75 m)
- Weight: 165 lb (75 kg)
Medal record
Men's freestyle skiing
Representing the United States
World Championships
Gold medal – first place	2009 Inawashiro	Aerials

Ryan St. Onge (born February 7, 1983) is an American freestyle skier who has competed since 1997.

== Career ==
He won a gold medal in the aerials event at the FIS Freestyle World Ski Championships 2009 in Inawashiro.

At the 2006 Winter Olympics in Turin, St. Onge finished 16th in the aerials event.

He also has seven World Cup victories in aerials from 2005 to 2009.

St. Onge was named to the US team for the 2010 Winter Olympics in January 2010, qualified and finished fourth.
