= Warren Shouldice =

Canadian freestyle skier (born 1983)

Personal information
- Born: April 1, 1983 (age 43) Calgary, Alberta, Canada
- Height: 1.75 m (5 ft 9 in)
- Weight: 72.57 kg (160.0 lb; 11.428 st)

Sport
- Country: Canada
- Sport: Freestyle skiing
Medal record
Men's freestyle skiing
Representing Canada
FIS Freestyle World Ski Championships
Gold medal – first place	2011 Deer Valley	Aerials
Bronze medal – third place	2009 Inawashiro	Aerials

Warren Shouldice (born April 1, 1983 in Calgary) is a retired Canadian freestyle skier. Over his career, Shouldice has earned twelve podium finishes at World Cup events. His best result came in 2011, when he won the World Championships in Deer Valley Utah. Shouldice won his first World Championship medal in 2009, a bronze.

Shouldice competes in aerials, and made his World Cup debut in January 2003. His first podium came a year later, when he finished second in an event at Mont Tremblant. His first, World Cup victory came in December 2005 in Changchun. Shouldice also won a memorable World Cup event in his hometown of Calgary in 2011.

Shouldice competed in the 2006 Olympic Games and 2010 Olympic Games. In Torino he qualified in 3rd place, and recorded the 6th highest score on each of his two jumps in the final, en route to 6th place overall. He finished 10th at the Olympics in Vancouver, after touching back on one of his jumps. Shouldice followed Olympic disappointment by winning a World Championship title the following season. He landed a perfect lay triple full full and described the victory as "I'm the only one who does that jump in the whole world, and I got a perfect score on it right here tonight. This can't be happening. This only happens in fairy tales and my dreams. It can't be for real." Since retiring in 2012, Shouldice has gone on to a successful career as a real estate agent in his hometown of Calgary, AB.

== World Cup Podiums ==
Date	Location	Rank
January 11, 2004	Mont Tremblant	2nd place, silver medalist(s)
January 14, 2005	Lake Placid	2nd place, silver medalist(s)
December 16, 2005	China	1st place, gold medalist(s)
January 8, 2006	Mount Gabriel	1st place, gold medalist(s)
January 14, 2006	Deer Valley	2nd place, silver medalist(s)
February 10, 2008	Cypress Mountain	3rd place, bronze medalist(s)
March 7, 2008	Davos	2nd place, silver medalist(s)
December 20, 2008	China	3rd place, bronze medalist(s)
January 18, 2009	Lake Placid	3rd place, bronze medalist(s)
January 22, 2010	Lake Placid	2nd place, silver medalist(s)
December 17, 2010	China	2nd place, silver medalist(s)
January 28, 2011	Calgary	1st place, gold medalist(s)
