= Wang He (skier) =

Chinese freestyle skier

Personal information
- Nationality: Chinese
- Born: 16 April 1983 (age 43)

Sport
- Sport: Freestyle skiing

Wang He (born 16 April 1983) is a Chinese freestyle skier. She competed at the 2002 Winter Olympics and the 2006 Winter Olympics.
