= Apex Mountain Resort =

Ski resort in British Columbia, Canada

- Location within British Columbia Location within Canada
- Location: British Columbia, Canada
- Nearest city: Penticton
- Coordinates: 49.39°N 119.9°W
- Vertical: 603 m (1,978 ft)
- Top elevation: 2,178 m (7,146 ft)
- Base elevation: 1,575 m (5,167 ft)
- Skiable area: 4.5 km^{2} (1,112 acres)
- Trails: 79
- Longest run: 5 km (3 mi)
- Lift system: 4 total (1 Conveyor, 1 T-bar, 1 Triple chairlift, 1 High-Speed Quad)
- Terrain parks: 4
- Snowfall: 600 cm (240 in; 20 ft)
- Snowmaking: yes
- Website: apexresort.com

Apex Mountain Resort is a ski resort in southwestern Canada, located in the Okanagan region on Beaconsfield Mountain, just west of Penticton, British Columbia. Its first Pomalift was installed in 1961, with a vertical rise of 370 m (1,200 ft).

Beaconsfield Mountain has a summit elevation of 2,178 m (7,146 ft) above sea level and receives an average of 600 cm (20 ft) of snow a year. It has 4.5 km^{2} (1,112 acres) of groomed, skiable terrain, 50 km^{2} (20 sq mi) of backcountry skiing terrain, and 50 km (30 mi) of groomed cross-country terrain. There are 79 named trails accessed by four ski lifts, including one high-speed quad. The resort also offers four terrain parks and a tube park. Apex currently operates twelve snow guns that provide top-to-bottom snowmaking capability.

The mountain's main accommodation providers include Stay at Apex, Apex Lodge, and Apex Mountain Inn. Other activities that the resort provides include a 1.0 km (0.6 mi) skating loop and a hockey rink. Nearby, Nickel Plate Nordic Centre also offers snowshoeing and cross-country skiing.

Runs (by lift and difficulty):

Stocks Triple Chair:

Beginner: Whipsaw, Finger, Dude-Ney Trail, Village Traverse, Easy Out, Greenhorn's Traverse, Stock's Traverse

Intermediate: Maverick, Stagecoach, Lucky Strike, Sluice Box, Gambit, Lower Gambit, Motherlode, Little Joe, Sweet Louise

Advanced: Window

Quickdraw Express Quad:

Beginner: Grandfather's Trail

Intermediate: Ben's Run, Wild Bill, Ridge Run, Juniper, 97C, Dawdler 1, Dawdler 2, Wildly Easy (Wildside), Easy Out (Wildside)

Advanced: Sun Bowl, West Bank, The Pit, The Great Wall, Toilet Bowl, Essendale, Grouse Gulch, Tongue, Hanks, Showboat, Highway 97, Face, Poma, Chute, K, K2, Magnum, Buckshot, Winchester, Golden Eagle, Shootout (Wildside), Gun Slinger (Wildside), Grandmother's Trail (Wildside), Hang’em High (Wildside), Lower Hang’em High (Wildside), Jackpot (Wildside), Showdown (Wildside), Bob's Run (Wildside), Glades (Wildside)

Expert: Tooth Tusk, Sweet Sue, Gromit, Gunbarrel, 22, Pea Shooter, Make My Day, Dirty Harry

T-Bar:

Beginner: Rookies Trail, Chicken Finger

Intermediate: Adrian's Alley, Spruce Hollow, Old Mill, Okanagan Run, Wishbone, Okanagan Night Park

Advanced: Andi's Alley, Kristi's

Terrain Parks: Skier/Boarder Cross, Claim Jumper, Prospector, Terrain Park

Magic Carpet (conveyor lift):

Beginner: Easy Rider

Tube Runs: Tube Park

== See also ==
- List of ski areas and resorts in Canada
