= Elizabeth Gardner (athlete) =

Australian freestyle skier

Liz Gardner
Personal information
- Full name: Elizabeth Gardner
- Born: 4 September 1980 (age 45) Melbourne, Australia
- Height: 5 ft 1 in (1.55 m)
- Weight: 121 lb (55 kg)

Sport
- Country: Australia
- Sport: Freestyle Skiing

Elizabeth Gardner (born 4 September 1980 in Melbourne, Australia), also known as Liz Gardner, is an Australian freestyle skier.

== Professional career ==
Gardner made her professional debut on 8 September 2001 at the Mount Buller women's aerial event. Since her debut, she has competed in the Europa, Nor-Am, and World Cup. Her coach is Michel Roth.

Her best World Cup result was third at Fernie, British Columbia and Sauze d'Oulx, Italy.

She has participated in two Olympic games; the 2006 Turin Olympics and the 2010 Vancouver Winter Games. Gardner finished 23rd in Turin, and finished 10th in Vancouver.

== Personal life ==
Her nicknames vary from Gards and Beth to Lizard. Gardner was a gymnast before switching to aerials. She completed a bachelor's degree in Applied Science (Human Movement) at the Royal Melbourne Institute of Technology.
