= Lydia Lassila =

Australian freestyle skier (born 1982)

Lydia Lassila OAM
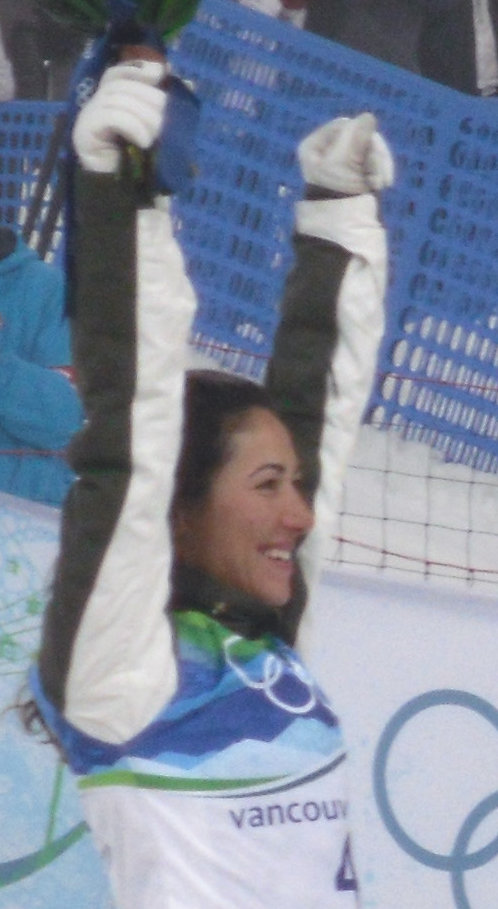
- Lassila at the 2010 Winter Olympics

Personal information
- Born: 17 January 1982 (age 44) Melbourne, Victoria, Australia
- Education: RMIT University
- Occupations: Skier; entrepreneur; motivational speaker
- Height: 157 cm (5 ft 2 in)
- Weight: 52 kg (115 lb)
- Spouse: Lauri Lassila
- Children: 2
- Website: www.bodyice.com

Sport
- Country: Australia
- Sport: Freestyle skiing
- Coached by: Michel Roth
Medal record
Women's freestyle skiing
Representing Australia
Olympic Games
Gold medal – first place	2010 Vancouver	Aerials
Bronze medal – third place	2014 Sochi	Aerials

Lydia Lassila OAM (née Ierodiaconou) (born 17 January 1982) is an Australian Olympic freestyle skier gold medalist who competed in the 2002, 2006, 2010, 2014 and 2018 Winter Olympic Games. She is the 2010 Olympic champion and the 2014 bronze medalist in aerials.

On 20 October 2010, Lassila was awarded the prestigious 'The Don' award by the Sport Australia Hall of Fame, which recognised her ability to inspire as well as her achievements during 2010, including her gold medal performance at the 2010 Winter Olympic Games.

== Personal life ==
Lydia Lassila (née Ierodiaconou) was born 17 January 1982 in Melbourne, Australia. She is of Greek-Cypriot and Italian descent. Her mother is Italian and her father Cypriot.

Lassila completed her primary schooling at Our Lady of the Immaculate Conception Primary School in Sunshine, Victoria, and completed her secondary education at Methodist Ladies' College, Melbourne and Westbourne Grammar School. She completed a bachelor's degree in Applied Science (Human Movement) at RMIT University. She is married to Lauri Lassila, a Finnish former professional freestyle skier, whose career included placing 2nd in moguls at the FIS Freestyle Skiing World Championships in 1999. She gave birth to her first son in 2011 after winning gold at the 2010 Vancouver Winter Olympics. Her second son was born in 2015 after the 2014 Sochi Winter Olympics where she claimed bronze. In 2020, they moved from Lorne, Victoria, to Kittilä, Finnish Lapland, near to the Levi fell.

== Career ==
In June 2005, Lassila suffered a ruptured anterior cruciate ligament (ACL) and underwent knee reconstruction using an allograft. This allowed for a faster recovery and a swift return to the slopes in time for the start of the 2006 Winter Olympic Games in February.

During the second qualifying round of the Torino aerials competition, Lassila's knee collapsed on impact after she attempted to land a difficult jump, re-rupturing her ACL and forcing her to withdraw. However, taking inspiration from compatriots and teammates Jacqui Cooper and Alisa Camplin, both of whom have suffered similar knee injuries, the then 24-year-old Lassila vowed to return to the sport when she recovered.

Lassila made her comeback to World Cup competition 16 months later in China in December 2007, collecting a silver medal in her first event.

She ended the 2007/08 season ranked second in the World Cup standings, and then went on to win her first World Cup title in the following 2008/09 season.

=== 2010 Winter Olympics ===
At the 2010 Winter Olympics in Vancouver, Lassila won gold in the aerials, getting Australia's second gold medal for the games after snowboarder Torah Bright won gold in the halfpipe, also at Cypress Mountain. This medal was also the second gold for an Australian in the aerials at all Winter Olympic Games, after Alisa Camplin in 2002. There was a lot of pressure and hype from the Australian press for Lassila to do well as world number one. She was in second position after the first jump of the final, before posting the highest scoring second round jump. The leader after the first jump, Xu Mengtao, had the last jump, but scored more than 25 points below Lassila's second jump to fall down the rankings into sixth, due to a failed landing. Lassila had a combined score of 214.74, beating second placed Li Nina with 207.23 points. Australian team-mates Jacqui Cooper and Elizabeth Gardner finished 5th with 194.29 and 12th with 86.70 respectively.

=== 2014 Winter Olympics ===
Lassila achieved a bronze medal in the Freestyle Skiing Women's Aerials event. Her jump was a quad-twisting triple somersault. If she had 'landed' it she would have been the first woman to do so, but she landed hard and 'slapped' down on her back on landing. Her score for the aerial was 72.12. Lassilas' prior jumps were scored at 95.76 and 99.22.

=== Return to competition ===
At the beginning of 2017, Lassila returned to competition in a bid to return to the Winter Olympics for 2018. On 3 February 2017 she won her first World Cup event since 2014, clinching a close fought victory ahead of Kiley McKinnon (USA) and Xu Mengtao (CHN) at Deer Valley. She then went on to obtain the second and the third World Cup wins at the end of February in Minsk and in the beginning of March 2017 in Moscow.

== Awards ==
Apart from her sporting medals, Lassila has also received other honours and awards:

- 2010 Australian Institute of Sport 'Athlete of the Year'
- 2010 Sport Australia Hall of Fame, 'The Don' Award
- 2010 Governor's Award for the Victorian Sportsperson of the Year
- 2010 Victorian Female Athlete of the Year- Kitty McEwan Award
- 2010 Ski and Snowboard Australia Athlete of the Year
- 2023 - Sport Australia Hall of Fame inductee

== Film/Television ==
Lydia is the subject of a feature documentary film called The Will To Fly that chronicles her life and sport pursuits. The film was released in Australia in 2016 to much critical acclaim. In 2022, Lassila joined Seven Network's commentary team for the 2022 Winter Olympics.

=== Australian Survivor ===
In 2018, Lassila appeared as a contestant on Australian Survivor: Champions vs. Contenders, competing in the fifth season of the competitive reality television series Australian Survivor as part of the Champions tribe. In the beginning of the game, Lassila dominated in challenges, winning for her tribe in many instances. Lassila made very strong relationships in the game, notably with fellow contestants Mat Rogers and Shane Gould. Come the merge, Lassila was seen as a physical threat by many contestants and was voted out in 12th place.

In 2020, Lassila returned to appear on Australian Survivor: All Stars, being eliminated via a fire challenge against opposing tribe member Phoebe Timmins on Day 18.

Awards and achievements
Preceded by Emma Moffatt and Brenton Rickard	Australian Athlete of the Year; 2010	Succeeded by Anna Meares
