= FIS Freestyle World Ski Championships 2013 – Women's dual moguls =

Freestyle world ski championships

The women's dual moguls competition of the FIS Freestyle World Ski Championships 2013 was held at Myrkdalen-Voss, Norway on March 7 (qualifying) and March 8 (finals). 37 athletes from 17 countries competed.

== Results ==
=== Qualification ===
The following are the results of the qualification.

Rank	Bib	Name	Country	Score	Notes
1	1	Hannah Kearney	United States	25.37	Q
2	5	Chloé Dufour-Lapointe	Canada	24.30	Q
3	15	Arisa Murata	Japan	23.94	Q
4	9	Audrey Robichaud	Canada	23.89	Q
5	6	Miki Itō	Japan	23.49	Q
6	3	Heather McPhie	United States	23.22	Q
7	7	Nikola Sudová	Czech Republic	23.12	Q
8	19	Regina Rakhimova	Russia	23.09	Q
9	14	Andi Naude	Canada	22.96	Q
10	10	Mikaela Matthews	United States	22.78	Q
11	4	Eliza Outtrim	United States	22.51	Q
12	24	Elena Muratova	Russia	22.11	Q
13	16	Britteny Cox	Australia	21.95	Q
14	27	Ning Qin	China	21.89	Q
15	2	Justine Dufour-Lapointe	Canada	21.84	Q
16	29	Nicole Parks	Australia	21.55	Q
17	12	Yulia Galysheva	Kazakhstan	21.50	
18	25	Darya Rybalova	Kazakhstan	21.21	
19	23	Seo Jung-Hwa	South Korea	20.86	
20	8	Aiko Uemura	Japan	20.71	
21	40	Deborah Scanzio	Italy	20.17	
22	30	Seo Jee-Won	South Korea	19.73	
23	37	Ellie Koyander	Great Britain	19.32	
24	34	Aurora Amundsen	Norway	18.37	
25	26	Tereza Vaculíková	Czech Republic	17.86	
26	32	Melanie Meilinger	Austria	16.20	
27	35	Julia Nilsson	Sweden	12.60	
28	21	Junko Hoshino	Japan	11.08	
29	33	Reyes Santa-Olalla	Spain	10.92	
30	36	Maj-Beldring Henningsen	Denmark	10.17	
31	31	Emilie Klingen Amundsen	Norway	7.75	
32	22	Marika Pertakhiya	Russia	7.54	
33	20	Hedvig Wessel	Norway	5.44	
	38	Karin Hackl	Austria	DNF	
	39	Claudia Kohler	Austria	DNF	
	41	Thea Johnsen Berg	Norway	DNF	
	42	Nina Bednarik	Slovenia	DNS	

=== Final ===
The following are the results of the final.

Round of 16
1	Hannah Kearney (USA)	W
16	Nicole Parks (AUS)
8	Regina Rakhimova (RUS)
9	Andi Naude (CAN)	W
5	Miki Itō (JPN)	W
12	Elena Muratova (RUS)
4	Audrey Robichaud (CAN)
13	Britteny Cox (AUS)	W
3	Arisa Murata (JPN)	W
14	Ning Qin (CHN)
6	Heather McPhie (USA)	W
11	Eliza Outtrim (USA)
7	Nikola Sudová (CZE)	W
10	Mikaela Matthews (USA)
2	Chloé Dufour-Lapointe (CAN)	W
15	Justine Dufour-Lapointe (CAN)

Quarterfinals
1	Hannah Kearney (USA)	W
9	Andi Naude (CAN)
5	Miki Itō (JPN)	W
13	Britteny Cox (AUS)
3	Arisa Murata (JPN)
6	Heather McPhie (USA)	W
7	Nikola Sudová (CZE)
2	Chloé Dufour-Lapointe (CAN)	W

Semifinals
1	Hannah Kearney (USA)
5	Miki Itō (JPN)	W
6	Heather McPhie (USA)
2	Chloé Dufour-Lapointe (CAN)	W

Finals
5	Miki Itō (JPN)	2nd place, silver medalist(s)
2	Chloé Dufour-Lapointe (CAN)	1st place, gold medalist(s)
Third place
1	Hannah Kearney (USA)	3rd place, bronze medalist(s)
6	Heather McPhie (USA)
