= FIS Freestyle World Ski Championships 2011 – Women's dual moguls =

The women's dual moguls competition of the FIS Freestyle World Ski Championships 2011 was held at Deer Valley, United States on 5 February.

== Qualification ==
Rank	Bib	Name	Country	Time	Score			Total	Notes
Rank	Bib	Name	Country	Time	Turns	Air	Time	Total	Notes
1	1	Hannah Kearney	United States	30.42	13.6	4.84	5.83	24.27	Q
2	2	Jennifer Heil	Canada	29.47	13.1	4.56	6.21	23.87	Q
3	6	Heather McPhie	United States	29.89	12.6	4.50	6.04	23.14	Q
4	11	Chloé Dufour-Lapointe	Canada	30.29	11.8	5.04	5.88	22.72	Q
5	3	Audrey Robichaud	Canada	31.45	12.6	4.20	5.42	22.22	Q
6	7	Eliza Outtrim	United States	32.28	12.3	4.68	5.08	22.06	Q
7	10	Regina Rakhimova	Russia	31.21	11.9	4.62	5.51	22.03	Q
8	4	Kristi Richards	Canada	30.43	11.6	4.38	5.82	21.80	Q
9	12	Marika Pertakhiya	Russia	31.78	11.3	4.09	5.28	20.67	Q
10	9	Nikola Sudova	Czech Republic	32.53	11.9	3.66	4.98	20.54	Q
11	8	Ekaterina Stolyarova	Russia	31.12	10.2	4.74	5.55	20.49	Q
12	34	Britteny Cox	Australia	32.51	11.2	4.20	4.99	20.39	Q
13	21	Arisa Murata	Japan	32.11	10.4	4.58	5.15	20.13	Q
14	25	Kayla Snyderman	United States	32.64	11.3	3.84	4.94	20.08	Q
15	13	Anastassia Gunchenko	Russia	31.90	11.2	3.24	5.24	19.68	Q
16	14	Deborah Scanzio	Italy	34.45	10.4	4.80	4.22	19.42	Q
17	23	Tereza Vaculikova	Czech Republic	32.60	9.9	4.50	4.96	19.36	
18	22	Marina Kaffka	Germany	32.04	10.5	3.60	5.18	19.28	
19	29	Nicole Parks	Australia	32.41	8.3	4.08	5.03	17.41	
20	33	Junko Hoshino	Japan	33.60	8.4	3.96	4.56	16.92	
21	32	Ellie Koyander	United Kingdom	34.53	8.9	3.60	4.18	16.68	
22	31	Seo Jee-Won	Korea	36.27	8.0	3.06	3.49	14.55	
23	28	Samanta Gobbi	Switzerland	37.82	8.0	2.99	2.87	13.86	
24	26	Reyes Santa-Olalla	Spain	39.37	4.9	3.13	2.25	10.28	
25	27	Xue Yang	People's Republic of China	48.63	2.1	1.17	0.00	3.27	
26	35	Junhan Shao	People's Republic of China	45.93	1.5	1.02	0.00	2.52	

== Elimination round ==
Round of 16
D. Scanzio (ITA)
H. Kearney (USA)
K. Richards (CAN)
M. Pertakhiya (RUS)
B. Cox (AUS)
A. Robichaud (CAN)
C. Dufour-Lapointe (CAN)
A. Murata (JPN)
H. McPhie (USA)
K. Snyderman (USA)
E. Stolyarova (RUS)
E. Outtrim (USA)
R. Rakhimova (RUS)
N. Sudova (CZE)
A. Gunchenko (RUS)
J. Heil (CAN)

Quarterfinals
H. Kearney (USA)
K. Richards (CAN)
A. Robichaud (CAN)
C. Dufour-Lapointe (CAN)
H. McPhie (USA)
E. Stolyarova (RUS)
N. Sudova (CZE)
J. Heil (CAN)

Semifinals
H. Kearney (USA)
C. Dufour-Lapointe (CAN)
H. McPhie (USA)
J. Heil (CAN)

Finals
C. Dufour-Lapointe (CAN)	2nd place, silver medalist(s)
J. Heil (CAN)	1st place, gold medalist(s)
Third place
H. Kearney (USA)	3rd place, bronze medalist(s)
H. McPhie (USA)
