= FIS Freestyle World Ski Championships 2011 – Women's moguls =

The women's moguls competition of the FIS Freestyle World Ski Championships 2011 was held at Deer Valley, United States on February 2, 2011 (qualifications and finals). 27 athletes from 17 countries competed.

== Results ==
=== Qualification ===
| Rank | Bib | Name | Country | Time | Score | | | Total | Notes |
| Rank | Bib | Name | Country | Time | Turns | Air | Time | Total | Notes |
|---|---|---|---|---|---|---|---|---|---|
| 1 | 2 | Jennifer Heil | Canada | 30.66 | 12.9 | 4.62 | 5.73 | 23.25 | Q |
| 2 | 1 | Hannah Kearney | United States | 31.72 | 12.7 | 4.68 | 5.31 | 22.69 | Q |
| 3 | 4 | Kristi Richards | Canada | 33.54 | 11.4 | 5.16 | 4.58 | 21.14 | Q |
| 4 | 10 | Regina Rakhimova | Russia | 32.79 | 11.5 | 4.32 | 4.88 | 20.70 | Q |
| 5 | 8 | Ekaterina Stolyarova | Russia | 32.96 | 11.2 | 4.56 | 4.81 | 20.57 | Q |
| 6 | 7 | Eliza Outtrim | United States | 32.99 | 11.1 | 4.62 | 4.80 | 20.52 | Q |
| 7 | 6 | Heather McPhie | United States | 32.61 | 10.8 | 4.26 | 4.95 | 20.01 | Q |
| 8 | 3 | Audrey Robichaud | Canada | 34.59 | 10.9 | 4.62 | 4.16 | 19.68 | Q |
| 9 | 14 | Deborah Scanzio | Italy | 33.64 | 10.5 | 4.38 | 4.54 | 19.42 | Q |
| 10 | 9 | Nikola Sudova | Czech Republic | 34.04 | 11.9 | 3.06 | 4.38 | 19.34 | Q |
| 11 | 12 | Marika Pertakhiya | Russia | 32.35 | 10.0 | 4.09 | 5.06 | 19.15 | Q |
| 12 | 21 | Arisa Murata | Japan | 32.32 | 9.9 | 4.06 | 5.07 | 19.03 | Q |
| 13 | 30 | Martina Schriwer | Sweden | 33.16 | 8.4 | 4.68 | 4.73 | 17.81 | Q |
| 14 | 22 | Marina Kaffka | Germany | 32.38 | 9.2 | 3.48 | 5.04 | 17.72 | Q |
| 15 | 23 | Tereza Vaculikova | Czech Republic | 32.73 | 8.7 | 3.90 | 4.90 | 17.50 | Q |
| 16 | 13 | Anastassia Gunchenko | Russia | 35.27 | 9.3 | 3.36 | 3.89 | 16.55 | Q |
| 17 | 34 | Britteny Cox | Australia | 34.94 | 8.1 | 4.02 | 4.02 | 16.14 | |
| 18 | 19 | Heidi Kloser | United States | 35.48 | 6.4 | 3.48 | 3.80 | 13.68 | |
| 19 | 31 | Jee-Won Seo | South Korea | 37.95 | 7.9 | 2.82 | 2.82 | 13.56 | |
| 20 | 33 | Junko Hoshino | Japan | 36.99 | 5.8 | 4.14 | 3.20 | 13.14 | |
| 21 | 28 | Samanta Gobbi | Switzerland | 40.97 | 3.0 | 2.78 | 1.61 | 7.39 | |
| 22 | 11 | Chloé Dufour-Lapointe | Canada | 47.99 | 0.4 | 3.30 | 0.00 | 3.70 | |
| 23 | 26 | Reyes Santa-Olalla | Spain | 43.50 | 0.3 | 2.40 | 0.60 | 3.30 | |
| 24 | 27 | Xue Yang | China | 56.46 | 1.1 | 1.06 | 0.00 | 2.16 | |
| 25 | 35 | Junhan Shao | China | 57.38 | 1.4 | 0.72 | 0.00 | 2.12 | |
| 26 | 32 | Ellie Koyander | United Kingdom | 45.46 | 1.1 | 0.30 | 0.00 | 1.40 | |
| 27 | 29 | Nicole Parks | Australia | | | | | DNF | |

=== Final ===
| Rank | Bib | Name | Country | Time | Score | | | Total | Notes |
| Rank | Bib | Name | Country | Time | Turns | Air | Time | Total | Notes |
|---|---|---|---|---|---|---|---|---|---|
| 1st place, gold medalist(s) | 2 | Jennifer Heil | Canada | 30.11 | 13.6 | 4.80 | 5.95 | 24.35 | |
| 2nd place, silver medalist(s) | 1 | Hannah Kearney | United States | 29.68 | 14.0 | 4.19 | 6.12 | 24.31 | |
| 3rd place, bronze medalist(s) | 4 | Kristi Richards | Canada | 30.41 | 12.9 | 4.98 | 5.83 | 23.71 | |
| 4 | 8 | Ekaterina Stolyarova | Russia | 30.20 | 13.0 | 4.68 | 5.92 | 23.60 | |
| 5 | 7 | Eliza Outtrim | United States | 31.22 | 12.5 | 5.16 | 5.51 | 23.71 | |
| 6 | 6 | Heather McPhie | United States | 29.02 | 11.8 | 4.46 | 6.39 | 22.65 | |
| 7 | 10 | Regina Rakhimova | Russia | 31.13 | 12.0 | 4.86 | 5.54 | 22.40 | |
| 8 | 9 | Nikola Sudova | Czech Republic | 32.86 | 12.5 | 3.78 | 4.85 | 21.13 | |
| 9 | 12 | Marika Pertakhiya | Russia | 31.96 | 11.2 | 4.29 | 5.21 | 20.70 | |
| 10 | 3 | Audrey Robichaud | Canada | 33.45 | 11.1 | 4.62 | 4.62 | 20.34 | |
| 11 | 23 | Tereza Vaculikova | Czech Republic | 31.90 | 10.3 | 4.68 | 5.24 | 20.22 | |
| 12 | 21 | Arisa Murata | Japan | 31.27 | 10.1 | 4.09 | 5.49 | 19.68 | |
| 13 | 30 | Martina Schriwer | Sweden | 33.40 | 10.5 | 4.50 | 4.64 | 19.64 | |
| 14 | 22 | Marina Kaffka | Germany | 32.27 | 10.5 | 3.42 | 5.09 | 19.01 | |
| 15 | 13 | Anastassia Gunchenko | Russia | 32.38 | 10.0 | 3.54 | 5.04 | 18.58 | |
| 16 | 14 | Deborah Scanzio | Italy | 35.63 | 5.0 | 2.27 | 3.74 | 11.01 | |
