= Freestyle skiing at the 2006 Winter Olympics – Women's moguls =

Women's moguls at the XX Olympic Winter Games
- Venue: Sauze d'Oulx
- Dates: 11 February
- Competitors: 30 from 15 nations

Medalists
1st place, gold medalist(s)		Jennifer Heil	Canada
2nd place, silver medalist(s)		Kari Traa	Norway
3rd place, bronze medalist(s)		Sandra Laoura	France

The Women's Moguls event in freestyle skiing at the 2006 Winter Olympics in Turin, Italy took place on 11 February.

== Results ==
=== Qualification ===
Hannah Kearney, the winner of the event at the 2005 World Championship, failed to qualify for the final, while Canadian Jennifer Heil, the World Cup leader finished over a point ahead of the competition in her qualifying race.

Rank	Name	Country	Score	Notes
1	Jennifer Heil	Canada	26.67	Q
2	Sandra Laoura	France	25.45	Q
3	Sara Kjellin	Sweden	24.85	Q
4	Michelle Roark	United States	24.45	Q
5	Aiko Uemura	Japan	24.20	Q
6	Margarita Marbler	Austria	24.15	Q
7	Kari Traa	Norway	24.06	Q
8	Kristi Richards	Canada	23.76	Q
9	Tae Satoya	Japan	23.63	Q
10	Daria Serova	Russia	23.49	Q
11	Nikola Sudová	Czech Republic	23.31	Q
12	Audrey Robichaud	Canada	22.73	Q
13	Deborah Scanzio	Italy	22.72	Q
14	Ingrid Berntsen	Norway	22.45	Q
15	Miki Ito	Japan	22.34	Q
16	Manuela Berchtold	Australia	22.19	Q
17	Stephanie St. Pierre	Canada	22.15	Q
18	Shannon Bahrke	United States	22.07	Q
19	Marina Cherkasova	Russia	21.82	Q
20	Jillian Vogtli	United States	21.79	Q
21	Lyudmila Dymchenko	Russia	21.42	
22	Hannah Kearney	United States	20.80	
23	Mariangela Parravicini	Italy	19.62	
24	Nina Bednarik	Slovenia	19.54	
25	Darya Rybalova	Kazakhstan	18.70	
26	Sarka Sudova	Czech Republic	18.64	
27	Miyuki Hatanaka	Japan	18.61	
28	Yuliya Rodonova	Kazakhstan	16.76	
29	Nuria Montané	Spain	11.76	
30	Yun Chae-rin	South Korea	7.07	

=== Final ===
Heil, the top qualifier, started last, and was up against the time of Norwegian Kari Traa, who improved on her qualifying sum by 1.39 points. However, Heil's total of 26.50 was nearly a point better than Traa, which gave her the gold.

Rank	Athlete	Score
Gold medal	Jennifer Heil (CAN)	26.50
Silver medal	Kari Traa (NOR)	25.65
Bronze medal	Sandra Laoura (FRA)	25.37
4	Sara Kjellin (SWE)	24.74
5	Aiko Uemura (JPN)	24.01
6	Nikola Sudová (CZE)	23.58
7	Kristi Richards (CAN)	23.30
8	Audrey Robichaud (CAN)	23.10
9	Deborah Scanzio (ITA)	23.00
10	Shannon Bahrke (USA)	22.82
11	Jillian Vogtli (USA)	22.72
12	Stephanie St. Pierre (CAN)	22.52
13	Daria Serova (RUS)	22.44
14	Manuela Berchtold (AUS)	22.21
15	Tae Satoya (JPN)	22.12
16	Marina Cherkasova (RUS)	22.05
17	Margarita Marbler (AUT)	20.79
18	Michelle Roark (USA)	20.04
19	Ingrid Berntsen (NOR)	19.84
20	Miki Ito (JPN)	17.78
