= Freestyle skiing at the 2010 Winter Olympics – Women's moguls =

Women's moguls at the XXI Olympic Winter Games
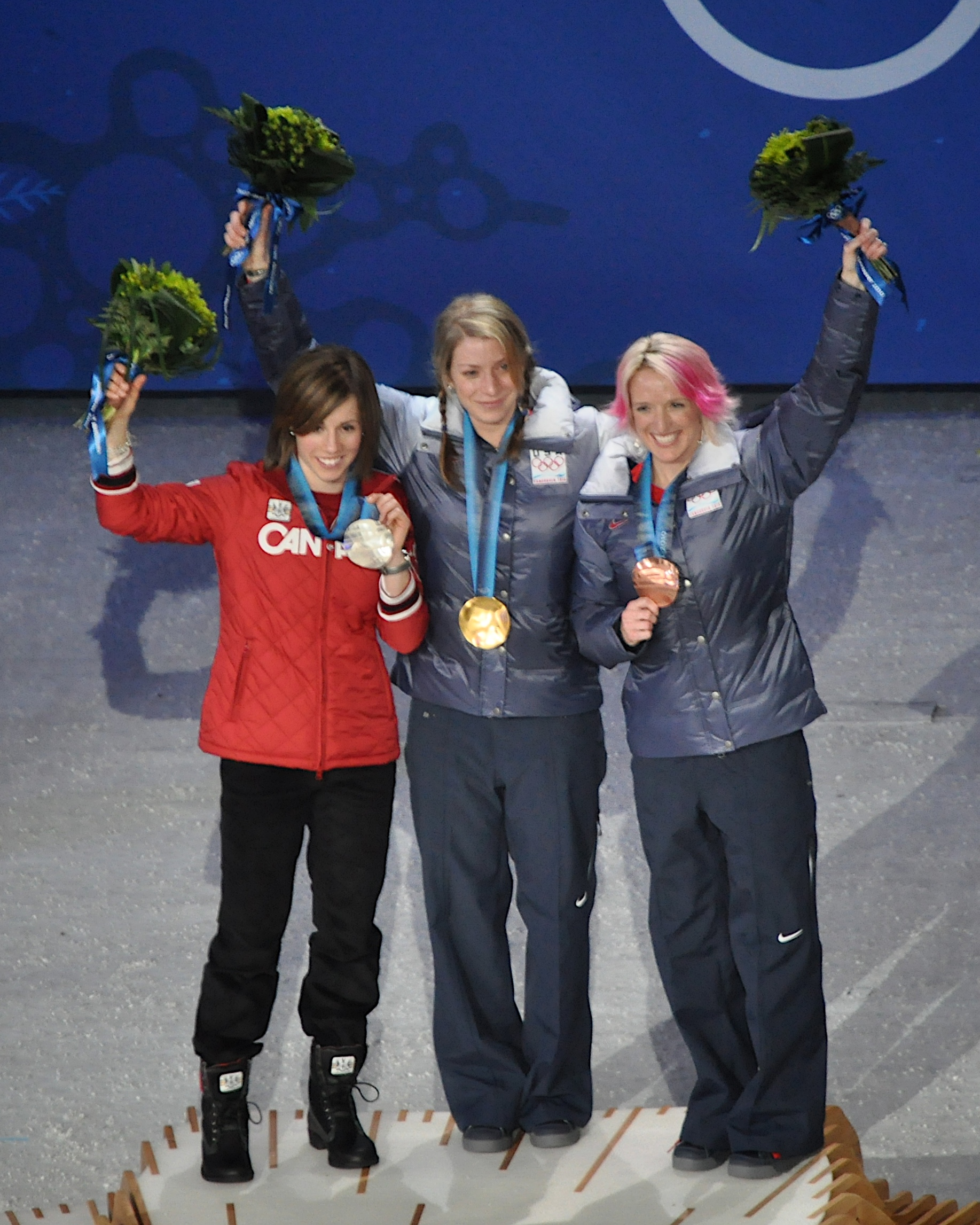
- The medalists in the event. From left: Jennifer Heil (silver), Hannah Kearney (gold) and Shannon Bahrke (bronze)
- Venue: Cypress Bowl Ski Area
- Dates: 13 February
- Competitors: 27 from 12 nations
- Winning Score: 26.63

Medalists
1st place, gold medalist(s)		Hannah Kearney	United States
2nd place, silver medalist(s)		Jennifer Heil	Canada
3rd place, bronze medalist(s)		Shannon Bahrke	United States

The women's moguls event in freestyle skiing at the 2010 Winter Olympics in Vancouver, Canada took place February 13 at Cypress Bowl Ski Area. The qualification event started at 4:30 PM PST and the final event took place at 7:30 PM PST.

== Results ==
=== Qualification ===
The qualification was held at 16:30.

Rank	Bib	Name	Country	Time	Score			Total	Notes
Rank	Bib	Name	Country	Time	Turns	Air	Time	Total	Notes
1	3	Hannah Kearney	United States	27.97	14.0	4.98	6.98	25.96	Q
2	1	Jennifer Heil	Canada	28.69	13.7	5.10	6.70	25.50	Q
3	2	Heather McPhie	United States	28.82	13.4	4.98	6.65	25.03	Q
4	5	Kristi Richards	Canada	29.11	13.0	5.10	6.53	24.63	Q
5	6	Aiko Uemura	Japan	29.11	12.8	4.98	6.53	24.31	Q
6	4	Shannon Bahrke	United States	29.74	13.3	4.68	6.29	24.27	Q
7	8	Michelle Roark	United States	29.64	12.8	4.85	6.33	23.98	Q
8	7	Margarita Marbler	Austria	29.93	13.0	4.56	6.21	23.77	Q
9	11	Chloé Dufour-Lapointe	Canada	30.02	12.2	5.36	6.18	23.74	Q
10	13	Ekaterina Stolyarova	Russia	31.04	11.9	5.34	5.77	23.01	Q
11	27	Arisa Murata	Japan	30.81	12.2	4.92	5.87	22.99	Q
12	9	Nikola Sudová	Czech Republic	31.63	12.6	4.26	5.54	22.40	Q
13	29	Tae Satoya	Japan	29.32	12.1	3.60	6.45	22.15	Q
14	14	Deborah Scanzio	Italy	32.40	12.1	4.50	5.24	21.84	Q
15	16	Miki Itō	Japan	32.06	11.7	4.74	5.37	21.81	Q
16	19	Yulia Galysheva	Kazakhstan	29.80	11.2	4.05	6.26	21.51	Q
17	20	Darya Rybalova	Kazakhstan	30.94	11.3	4.20	5.81	21.31	Q
18	25	Daria Serova	Russia	31.84	11.5	4.12	5.46	21.08	Q
19	22	Regina Rakhimova	Russia	32.06	11.2	4.44	5.37	21.01	Q
20	26	Marina Cherkasova	Russia	32.19	11.1	4.50	5.32	20.92	Q
21	28	Seo Jung-Hwa	South Korea	31.44	11.3	3.96	5.62	20.88	
22	23	Yuliya Rodionova	Kazakhstan	31.16	11.2	3.80	5.73	20.73	
23	32	Britteny Cox	Australia	32.63	10.7	4.02	5.15	19.87	
24	33	Ellie Koyander	Great Britain	31.99	9.8	3.78	5.40	18.98	
25	34	Šárka Sudová	Czech Republic	34.04	10.3	3.66	4.59	18.55	
26	31	Nina Bednarik	Slovenia	37.26	7.4	3.06	3.33	13.79	
27	30	Tereza Vaculíková	Czech Republic	DNF	0.3	1.20	0.00	1.50	

=== Final ===
The final was held at 19:30.

Rank	Bib	Name	Country	Time	Score			Total	Notes
Rank	Bib	Name	Country	Time	Turns	Air	Time	Total	Notes
1st place, gold medalist(s)	3	Hannah Kearney	United States	27.86	14.2	5.40	7.03	26.63	
2nd place, silver medalist(s)	1	Jennifer Heil	Canada	27.91	13.7	4.98	7.01	25.69	
3rd place, bronze medalist(s)	4	Shannon Bahrke	United States	27.90	13.5	4.92	7.01	25.43	
4	6	Aiko Uemura	Japan	28.88	12.9	5.16	6.62	24.68	
5	11	Chloé Dufour-Lapointe	Canada	29.87	12.7	4.93	6.24	23.87	
6	7	Margarita Marbler	Austria	29.52	13.0	4.32	6.37	23.69	
7	13	Ekaterina Stolyarova	Russia	30.96	12.7	5.04	5.81	23.55	
8	27	Arisa Murata	Japan	30.05	12.5	4.56	6.16	23.22	
9	22	Regina Rakhimova	Russia	30.77	11.9	4.92	5.88	22.70	
10	14	Deborah Scanzio	Italy	30.29	11.8	4.32	6.07	22.19	
11	19	Yulia Galysheva	Kazakhstan	29.67	11.4	4.46	6.31	22.17	
12	16	Miki Itō	Japan	31.51	11.6	4.44	5.59	21.63	
13	26	Marina Cherkasova	Russia	31.21	11.3	4.08	5.71	21.09	
14	20	Darya Rybalova	Kazakhstan	30.59	10.7	4.20	5.95	20.85	
15	25	Daria Serova	Russia	31.59	11.1	4.18	5.56	20.84	
16	9	Nikola Sudová	Czech Republic	31.10	10.6	3.06	5.75	19.41	
17	8	Michelle Roark	United States	32.27	5.9	4.71	5.29	15.90	
18	2	Heather McPhie	United States	30.92	4.8	3.90	5.82	14.52	
19	29	Tae Satoya	Japan	33.69	5.6	2.52	4.73	12.85	
20	5	Kristi Richards	Canada	DNF	1.6	2.76	0.00	4.36	
