= Russia at the 2010 Winter Olympics =

- IOC code: RUS
- NOC: Russian Olympic Committee
- Website: www.roc.ru (in Russian)

in Vancouver
- Competitors: 177 in 15 sports
- Flag bearer: Aleksey Morozov
- Medals Ranked 12th: Gold 2 Silver 5 Bronze 6 Total 13

Winter Olympics appearances (overview)
- 1994; 1998; 2002; 2006; 2010; 2014; 2018–2026

Other related appearances
- Soviet Union (1956–1988); Unified Team (1992); Olympic Athletes from Russia (2018); ROC (2022); Individual Neutral Athletes (2026)

Russia participated in the 2010 Winter Olympics in Vancouver, British Columbia, Canada.

In summary, the country's participants earned 13 medals: two gold, five silver, and six bronze. The gold-medal tally of two was the worst ever result for Russia since the breakup of the Soviet Union, whilst the total of 13 medals was the country's second lowest score since the 2002 Winter Games. This was seen as a national humiliation considering that Russia was to host the next Winter Games at Sochi.

According to Dr Maxim Titorenko, a Russian psychoanalyst and anthropologist,"the reasons for failures were to a large extent psychological. By receiving advance rewards [from the government] for something they were expected to do in future, the sportsmen lost all psychological incentive for further achievements.” The comparatively poor result generated a "chorus of criticism" in Russia, and President Dmitry Medvedev demanded the resignation of Russian Olympic officials and ordered an audit. Corruption, as well as cronyism and apathy of Russian sports managers, was criticized. It was later learned that Russia's performance at the Olympics followed widespread misspending by sports officials and a dysfunctional bureaucracy, according to government auditors. Russia spent $186 million for the games, including preparations. The audit cited dozens of examples of money being wasted, saying the figure ran into millions of dollars.

By contrast, Russia performed well at the Paralympics, also hosted in Vancouver, the following month. This led the media to highlight the contrast between the achievements of the country's Olympic and Paralympic delegations, despite the greater attention awarded to the Olympics.

Russia initially won three gold medals and 15 in total. However, biathlete Evgeny Ustyugov was later stripped of his gold and bronze medal for haemoglobin doping.

With Sochi being the host city of the 2014 Winter Olympics, a Russian segment was performed at the closing ceremony.

== Medalists ==
Medal	Name	Sport	Event
Gold	Nikita Kriukov	Cross-country skiing	Men's sprint
Gold	Svetlana Sleptsova; Anna Bogaliy-Titovets; Olga Medvedtseva; Olga Zaitseva	Biathlon	Women's relay
Silver	Alexander Panzhinskiy	Cross-country skiing	Men's sprint
Silver	Evgeni Plushenko	Figure skating	Men's singles
Silver	Olga Zaitseva	Biathlon	Women's mass start
Silver	Ivan Skobrev	Speed skating	Men's 10000 metres
Silver	Ekaterina Ilyukhina	Snowboarding	Women's parallel giant slalom
Bronze	Ivan Skobrev	Speed skating	Men's 5000 metres
Bronze	Aleksandr Tretyakov	Skeleton	Men's skeleton
Bronze	Alexandr Zubkov; Alexey Voyevoda	Bobsleigh	Two-man
Bronze	Irina Khazova; Natalya Korostelyova	Cross-country skiing	Women's team sprint
Bronze	Nikolay Morilov; Alexey Petukhov	Cross-country skiing	Men's team sprint
Bronze	Oksana Domnina; Maxim Shabalin	Figure skating	Ice dancing

Sport	Athletes			Events		Gold	Silver	Bronze
Sport	Men	Women	Total	Competed	Total	Gold	Silver	Bronze
Alpine skiing	3	2	5	10	10			
Biathlon	5	6	11	10	10	1	1	0
Bobsleigh	13	4	17	3	3			1
Cross-country skiing	11	8	19	12	12	1	1	2
Curling		5	5	1	2			
Figure skating	8	8	16	4	4		1	1
Freestyle skiing	7	5	12	5	6			
Ice hockey	23	21	44	2	2			
Luge	7	3	10	3	3			
Nordic combined	2		2	2	3			
Short track speed skating	2	3	5	6	8			
Skeleton	2	2	4	2	2			1
Ski jumping	4		4	3	3			
Snowboarding	2	4	6	3	6		1	
Speed skating	7	10	17	11	12		1	1
TOTAL	96	81	177	77	86	2	5	6

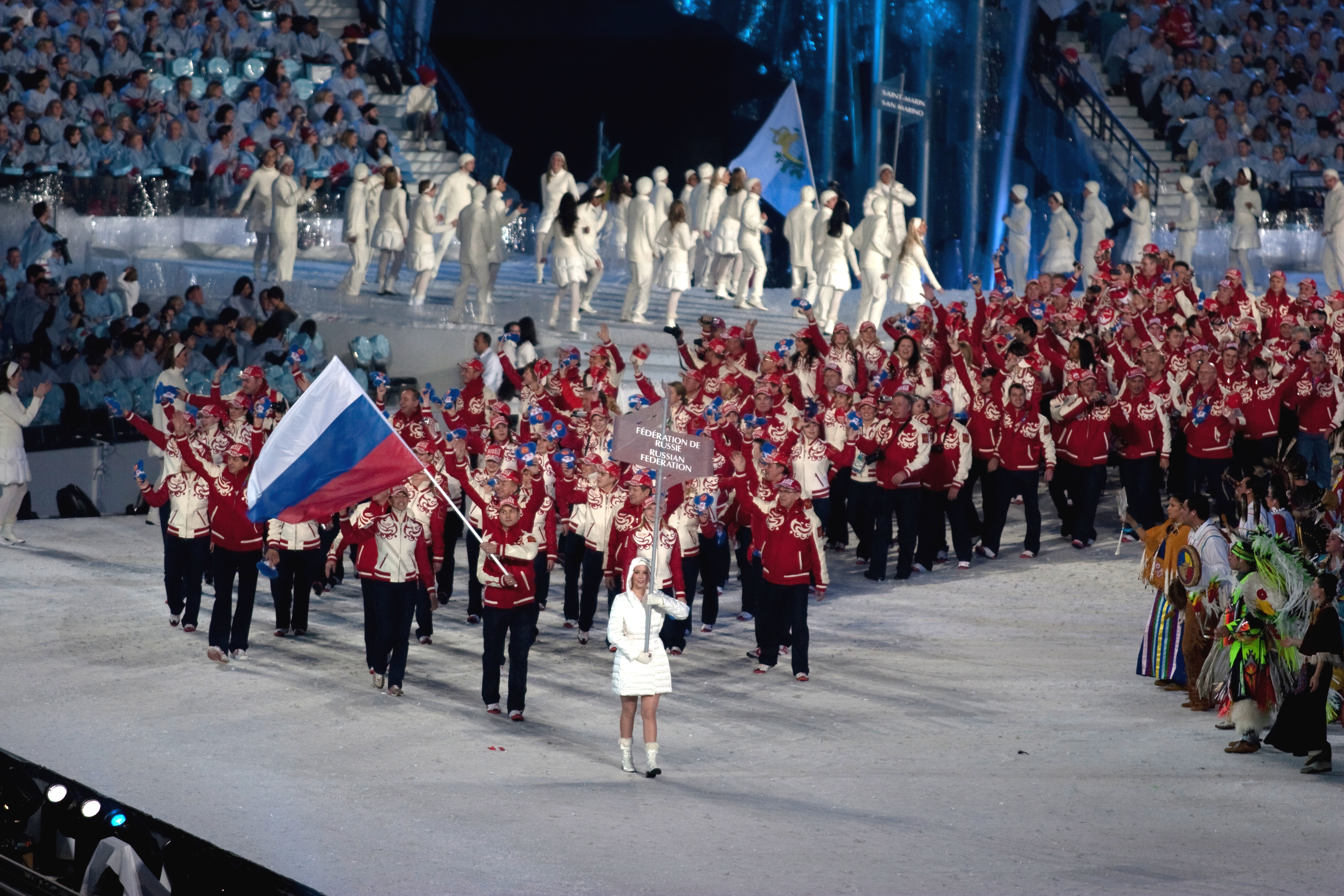
The athletes entering the stadium during the opening ceremonies.

== Alpine skiing ==
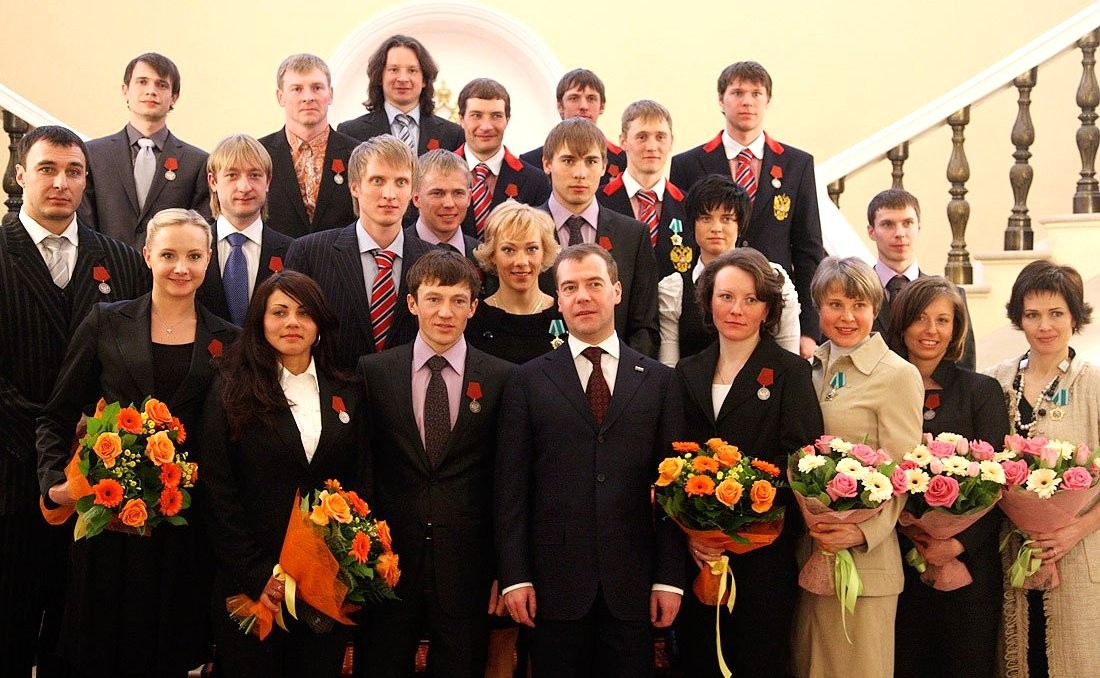
2010-03-15

.

Athlete	Event	Run 1	Run 2	Total	Rank
Aleksandr Khoroshilov	Men's downhill			1:59.21	45
Aleksandr Khoroshilov	Men's super-G			1:32.84	28
Aleksandr Khoroshilov	Men's combined	1:56.77	52.51	2:49.28	21
Aleksandr Khoroshilov	Men's giant slalom	1:21.28	1:24.08	2:45.36	38
Aleksandr Khoroshilov	Men's slalom	50.50	52.32	1:42.82	23
Sergei Maitakov	Men's super-G			Did not finish	
Sergei Maitakov	Men's giant slalom	1:21.13	1:24.53	2:45.66	42
Sergei Maitakov	Men's slalom	DNF		Did not finish	
Stepan Zuev	Men's downhill			2:00.58	54
Stepan Zuev	Men's super-G			1:34.13	36
Stepan Zuev	Men's combined	1:57.23	52.52	2:49.75	23
Stepan Zuev	Men's giant slalom	1:26.32	1:33.41	2:59.73	64
Stepan Zuev	Men's slalom	DNF		Did not finish	
Elena Prosteva	Women's downhill			1:50.07	26
Elena Prosteva	Women's combined	DNF		Did not finish	
Elena Prosteva	Women's super-G			1:24.43	24
Elena Prosteva	Women's giant slalom	DNF		Did not finish	
Elena Prosteva	Women's slalom	54.20	54.14	1:48.34	28
Lyaysan Rayanova	Women's super-G			Did not finish	
Lyaysan Rayanova	Women's giant slalom	1:20.37	1:16.58	2:36.95	37
Lyaysan Rayanova	Women's slalom	55.13	55.69	1:50.82	33

== Biathlon ==
Men

Athlete	Event	Final		
Athlete	Event	Time	Misses	Rank
Nikolay Kruglov	Individual	50:40.4	0	11
Anton Shipulin	Sprint	26:18.7	1	30
Anton Shipulin	Pursuit	35:34.4	3	20
Anton Shipulin	Individual	52:51.7	3	36
Anton Shipulin	Mass start	37:04.7	3	22
Ivan Tcherezov	Sprint	25:25.9	2	10
Ivan Tcherezov	Pursuit	34:29.6	2	6
Ivan Tcherezov	Individual	50:56.7	3	15
Ivan Tcherezov	Mass start	36:09.2	3	6
Maxim Tchoudov	Sprint	27:28.0	2	63
Evgeny Ustyugov	Sprint	25:47.9	2	15
Evgeny Ustyugov	Pursuit	35:07.4	4	15
Evgeny Ustyugov	Individual	49:11.8	1	4
Evgeny Ustyugov	Mass start	35:35.7	0	DSQ
Ivan Tcherezov; Anton Shipulin; Maxim Tchoudov; Evgeny Ustyugov	Relay	1:22:16.9	0+4	DSQ

Women

Athlete	Event	Final		
Athlete	Event	Time	Misses	Rank
Anna Bogaliy-Titovets	Individual	43:46.3	3	25
Anna Boulygina	Sprint	20:07.5	0	4
Anna Boulygina	Pursuit	31:08.1	1	6
Anna Boulygina	Mass start	39:17.2	8	30
Olga Medvedtseva	Sprint	21:01.6	1	22
Olga Medvedtseva	Pursuit	32:31.9	3	20
Olga Medvedtseva	Individual	43:25.9	2	21
Olga Medvedtseva	Mass start	35:40.8	0	4
Iana Romanova	Individual	46:41.0	5	56
Svetlana Sleptsova	Sprint	20:43.1	0	13
Svetlana Sleptsova	Pursuit	32:06.9	3	18
Svetlana Sleptsova	Mass start	36:23.3	3	14
Olga Zaitseva	Sprint	20:23.4	0	7
Olga Zaitseva	Pursuit	31:20.3	2	7
Olga Zaitseva	Individual	43:46.8	3	26
Olga Zaitseva	Mass start	35:25.1	1	2nd place, silver medalist(s)
Svetlana Sleptsova; Anna Bogaliy-Titovets; Olga Medvedtseva; Olga Zaitseva	Relay	1:09:36.3	0+5	1st place, gold medalist(s)

== Bobsleigh ==
Athlete	Event	Final					
Athlete	Event	Run 1	Run 2	Run 3	Run 4	Total	Rank
Alexandr Zubkov; Alexey Voyevoda	Two-man	51.79	52.02	51.80	51.90	3:27.51	3rd place, bronze medalist(s)
Dmitry Abramovitch; Sergey Prudnikov	Two-man	52.03	52.40	52.11	51.92	3:28.46	7
Olga Fyodorova; Yulia Timofeeva	Two-woman	54.40	55.21	54.40	57.39	3:41.40	18
Anastasiya Skulkina; Elena Doronina	Two-woman	54.38	53.64	54.08	53.83	3:35.93	9
Alexandr Zubkov; Filipp Yegorov; Petr Moiseev; Dmitry Trunenkov	Four-man	52.52	DNS	did not advance			
Dmitry Abramovitch; Roman Oreshnikov; Sergey Prudnikov; Dmitriy Stepushkin	Four-man	51.32	51.40	51.78	51.75	3:26.25	9
Yevgeni Popov; Alexey Kireev; Denis Moiseychenkov; Andrey Yurkov	Four-man	51.49	51.16	51.67	51.81	3:26.13	8

== Cross-country skiing ==
Distance
Men

Athlete	Event	Final	
Athlete	Event	Time	Rank
Alexander Legkov	15 km freestyle	34:51.1	15
Alexander Legkov	30 km pursuit	1:15:15.4	4
Alexander Legkov	50 km classical	2:05:53.3	14
Sergei Novikov	30 km pursuit	1:22:44.3	43
Nikolay Pankratov	30 km pursuit	1:19:48.9	32
Petr Sedov	15 km freestyle	35:06.2	26
Petr Sedov	50 km classical	2:07:35.4	24
Sergey Shiryayev	15 km freestyle	35:14.5	31
Sergey Shiryayev	50 km classical	did not finish	
Maxim Vylegzhanin	15 km freestyle	34:31.6	9
Maxim Vylegzhanin	30 km pursuit	1:17:04.2	17
Maxim Vylegzhanin	50 km classical	2:05:46.4	8
Nikolay Pankratov; Petr Sedov; Alexander Legkov; Maxim Vylegzhanin	4 x 10 km relay	1:47:04.7	8

Women

Athlete	Event	Final	
Athlete	Event	Time	Rank
Irina Khazova	10 km freestyle	26:08.7	20
Irina Khazova	15 km pursuit	41:56.1	13
Natalya Korostelyova	10 km freestyle	26:07.0	19
Yevgeniya Medvedeva	10 km freestyle	25:26.5	7
Yevgeniya Medvedeva	15 km pursuit	43:59.6	40
Olga Rocheva	15 km pursuit	42:30.5	26
Olga Rocheva	30 km classical	1:37:15.5	30
Olga Schuchkina	30 km classical	1:38:30.3	38
Olga Zavyalova	10 km freestyle	25:57.7	12
Olga Zavyalova	15 km pursuit	41:38.3	12
Olga Zavyalova	30 km classical	1:34:46.3	23
Olga Zavyalova; Irina Khazova; Yevgeniya Medvedeva; Natalya Korostelyova	4 x 5 km relay	57:00.9	7

Sprint

Athlete	Event	Qualifying		Quarterfinal		Semifinal		Final	
Athlete	Event	Total	Rank	Total	Rank	Total	Rank	Total	Rank
Mikhail Devyatyarov	Men's sprint	3:38.82	16 Q	3:35.3	4 Q	3:37.6	4	Did not advance	8
Nikita Kriukov	Men's sprint	3:36.46	4 Q	3:37.2	2 Q	3:34.6	3 Q	3:36.3	1st place, gold medalist(s)
Nikolay Morilov	Men's sprint	3:40.22	23 Q	3:40.2	6	did not advance			26
Alexander Panzhinskiy	Men's sprint	3:34.57	1 Q	3:36.4	1 Q	3:34.3	1 Q	3:36.3	2nd place, silver medalist(s)
Natalya Korostelyova	Women's sprint	3:45.56	14 Q	3:42.9	2 Q	3:48.1	6	Did not advance	12
Olga Rocheva	Women's sprint	3:53.87	40	did not advance					40
Yevgeniya Shapovalova	Women's sprint	3:49.52	26 Q	3:43.2	6	did not advance			28
Elena Turysheva	Women's sprint	3:51.99	35	did not advance					35
Nikolay Morilov; Alexey Petukhov	Men's team sprint					18:47.6	1 Q	19:02.5	3rd place, bronze medalist(s)
Irina Khazova; Natalya Korostelyova	Women's team sprint					18:48.0 q	5	18:07.7	3rd place, bronze medalist(s)

== Curling ==
=== Women's tournament ===
Team:
Skip: Ludmila Privivkova
Third: Anna Sidorova
Second: Nkeiruka Ezekh
Lead: Ekaterina Galkina
Alternate: Margarita Fomina

Round-robin
Draw 1

Tuesday, 16 February, 2:00 PM

Sheet C	1	2	3	4	5	6	7	8	9	10	Final
Germany (Schöpp) 🔨	2	0	2	0	1	0	0	1	0	3	9
Russia (Privivkova)	0	1	0	1	0	0	1	0	2	0	5

Draw 3

Wednesday, 17 February, 7:00 PM

Sheet A	1	2	3	4	5	6	7	8	9	10	Final
Russia (Privivkova)	0	0	1	0	0	2	0	1	1	2	7
Denmark (Jensen) 🔨	0	0	0	2	0	0	1	0	0	0	3

Draw 4

Thursday, 18 February, 2:00 PM

Sheet C	1	2	3	4	5	6	7	8	9	10	Final
Russia (Privivkova) 🔨	0	0	1	1	0	0	1	0	x	x	3
Great Britain (Muirhead)	2	3	0	0	2	2	0	1	x	x	10

Draw 5

Friday, 19 February, 9:00 AM

Sheet B	1	2	3	4	5	6	7	8	9	10	Final
Russia (Sidorova) 🔨	0	0	0	1	0	0	2	0	1	0	4
United States (McCormick)	0	0	1	0	2	0	0	1	0	2	6

Draw 6

Friday, 19 February, 7:00 PM

Sheet D	1	2	3	4	5	6	7	8	9	10	Final
Switzerland (Ott)	4	1	0	0	1	1	0	1	0	x	8
Russia (Sidorova) 🔨	0	0	1	1	0	0	2	0	1	x	5

Draw 7

Saturday, 20 February, 2:00 PM

Sheet A	1	2	3	4	5	6	7	8	9	10	Final
Sweden (Norberg)	0	0	0	0	0	1	0	x	x	x	1
Russia (Privivkova) 🔨	0	1	3	1	2	0	3	x	x	x	10

Draw 8

Sunday, 21 February, 9:00 AM

Sheet D	1	2	3	4	5	6	7	8	9	10	11	Final
Russia (Privivkova)	0	0	0	3	3	0	0	2	0	1	0	9
Japan (Meguro) 🔨	0	0	0	0	0	3	3	0	3	0	3	12

Draw 10

Monday, 22 February, 2:00 PM

Sheet A	1	2	3	4	5	6	7	8	9	10	Final
Russia (Sidorova)	0	0	3	0	1	0	1	1	1	x	7
China (Wang) 🔨	1	0	0	1	0	2	0	0	0	x	4

Draw 12

Tuesday, 23 February, 7:00 PM

Sheet B	1	2	3	4	5	6	7	8	9	10	Final
Canada (Bernard)	0	0	0	1	0	4	0	1	1	x	7
Russia (Sidorova) 🔨	0	1	0	0	1	0	1	0	0	x	3

Standings

Final round robin standings
Team	Skip	Pld	W	L	PF	PA	EW	EL	BE	SE	S%	Qualification
Canada	Cheryl Bernard	9	8	1	56	37	40	29	20	13	81%	Playoffs
Sweden	Anette Norberg	9	7	2	56	52	36	36	13	5	79%	Playoffs
China	Wang Bingyu	9	6	3	61	47	39	37	12	7	74%	Playoffs
Switzerland	Mirjam Ott	9	6	3	67	48	40	36	7	12	76%	Playoffs
Denmark	Angelina Jensen	9	4	5	49	61	31	40	15	5	74%	
Germany	Andrea Schöpp	9	3	6	52	56	35	40	15	4	75%	
Great Britain	Eve Muirhead	9	3	6	54	59	36	41	11	10	75%	
Japan	Moe Meguro	9	3	6	64	70	36	37	13	5	73%	
Russia	Liudmila Privivkova	9	3	6	53	60	36	40	14	13	77%	
United States	Debbie McCormick	9	2	7	43	65	36	36	12	12	77%	

== Figure skating ==
Russia has qualified two entrants in men's singles, two in ladies singles, three in pair skating, and three in ice dancing, for a total of 16 athletes.

Athlete(s)	Event	CD		SP/OD		FS/FD		Total	
Athlete(s)	Event	Points	Rank	Points	Rank	Points	Rank	Points	Rank
Evgeni Plushenko	Men's			90.85	1	165.51	2	256.36	2nd place, silver medalist(s)
Artem Borodulin	Men's			72.24	13	137.92	12	210.16	13
Ksenia Makarova	Ladies'			59.22	12	112.69	9	171.91	10
Alena Leonova	Ladies'			62.14	8	110.32	10	172.46	9
Yuko Kavaguti & Alexander Smirnov	Pairs			74.16	3	120.61	7	194.77	4
Maria Mukhortova & Maxim Trankov	Pairs			63.44	8	122.35	5	185.79	7
Vera Bazarova & Yuri Larionov	Pairs			56.54	12	106.96	11	163.50	11
Oksana Domnina & Maxim Shabalin	Ice dancing	43.76	1	62.84	3	101.04	3	207.64	3rd place, bronze medalist(s)
Ekaterina Bobrova & Dmitri Solovyev	Ice dancing	29.86	17	50.61	15	82.88	14	163.35	15
Jana Khokhlova & Sergei Novitski	Ice dancing	37.18	7	55.57	9	93.11	8	185.86	9

_{Key: CD = Compulsory Dance, FD = Free Dance, FS = Free Skate, OD = Original Dance, SP = Short Program}

== Freestyle skiing ==
Men

Athlete	Event	Qualifying		Final	
Athlete	Event	Points	Rank	Points	Rank
Alexandr Smyshlyaev	Moguls	23.65	14 Q	24.38	10
Andrey Volkov	Moguls	21.95	25	did not advance	
Denis Dolgodvorov	Moguls	23.09	18 Q	23.59	13
Sergey Volkov	Moguls	12.22	28	did not advance	
Dmitry Marushchak	Aerials	194.96	20	did not advance	
Yury Shapkin	Aerials	did not start		did not advance	

Women

Athlete	Event	Qualifying		Final	
Athlete	Event	Points	Rank	Points	Rank
Ekaterina Stolyarova	Moguls	23.01	10 Q	23.55	7
Regina Rakhimova	Moguls	21.01	19 Q	22.70	9
Marina Cherkasova	Moguls	20.92	20 Q	21.09	13
Daria Serova	Moguls	21.08	18 Q	20.84	15

Ski cross

Athlete	Event	Qualifying		Round of 16	Quarterfinals	Semifinals	Finals	Rank
Athlete	Event	Time	Rank	Position	Position	Position	Position	Rank
Egor Korotkov	Men's ski cross	1:14.54	20 Q	Audun Grønvold (NOR) (5); Scott Kneller (AUS) (12); Patrick Koller (AUS) (28); 3	did not advance			25
Yulia Livinskaya	Women's ski cross	1:22.83	32 Q	Anna Holmlund (SWE) (1); Sasa Faric (SLO) (16); Julia Manhard (GER) (24); 4 DNF	did not advance			32

== Ice hockey ==
=== Men's tournament ===
Roster

The following is the Russian roster in the men's ice hockey tournament of the 2010 Winter Olympics.

No.	Pos.	Name	Height	Weight	Birthdate	Birthplace	2009–10 team
30	G	Ilya Bryzgalov	191 cm (6 ft 3 in)	90 kg (200 lb)	22 June 1980	Tolyatti	(United States) Phoenix Coyotes (NHL)
20	G	Evgeni Nabokov	183 cm (6 ft 0 in)	91 kg (201 lb)	25 July 1975	Ust-Kamenogorsk, Kazakh SSR	(United States) San Jose Sharks (NHL)
40	G	Semyon Varlamov	191 cm (6 ft 3 in)	96 kg (212 lb)	27 April 1988	Kuybyshev	(United States) Washington Capitals (NHL)
55	D	Sergei Gonchar	188 cm (6 ft 2 in)	98 kg (216 lb)	13 April 1974	Chelyabinsk	(United States) Pittsburgh Penguins (NHL)
37	D	Denis Grebeshkov	185 cm (6 ft 1 in)	88 kg (194 lb)	11 October 1983	Yaroslavl	(Canada) Edmonton Oilers (NHL)
7	D	Dmitri Kalinin	191 cm (6 ft 3 in)	93 kg (205 lb)	22 July 1980	Chelyabinsk	(Russia) Salavat Yulaev Ufa (KHL)
22	D	Konstantin Korneyev	180 cm (5 ft 11 in)	82 kg (181 lb)	5 June 1984	Moscow	(Russia) CSKA Moscow (KHL)
79	D	Andrei Markov	183 cm (6 ft 0 in)	92 kg (203 lb)	20 December 1978	Voskresensk	(Canada) Montreal Canadiens (NHL)
5	D	Ilya Nikulin	191 cm (6 ft 3 in)	100 kg (220 lb)	12 March 1982	Moscow	(Russia) Ak Bars Kazan (KHL)
51	D	Fedor Tyutin	188 cm (6 ft 2 in)	95 kg (209 lb)	19 July 1983	Izhevsk	(United States) Columbus Blue Jackets (NHL)
6	D	Anton Volchenkov	185 cm (6 ft 1 in)	107 kg (236 lb)	15 February 1982	Moscow	(Canada) Ottawa Senators (NHL)
61	RW	Maxim Afinogenov	183 cm (6 ft 0 in)	86 kg (190 lb)	4 September 1979	Moscow	(United States) Atlanta Thrashers (NHL)
13	C	Pavel Datsyuk	180 cm (5 ft 11 in)	88 kg (194 lb)	20 July 1978	Sverdlovsk	(United States) Detroit Red Wings (NHL)
29	C	Sergei Fedorov	188 cm (6 ft 2 in)	93 kg (205 lb)	13 December 1969	Pskov	(Russia) Metallurg Magnitogorsk (KHL)
71	LW	Ilya Kovalchuk – A	187 cm (6 ft 2 in)	107 kg (236 lb)	15 April 1983	Kalinin	(United States) New Jersey Devils (NHL)
52	RW	Viktor Kozlov	196 cm (6 ft 5 in)	107 kg (236 lb)	14 February 1975	Tolyatti	(Russia) Salavat Yulaev Ufa (KHL)
11	C	Evgeni Malkin	191 cm (6 ft 3 in)	88 kg (194 lb)	31 July 1986	Magnitogorsk	(United States) Pittsburgh Penguins (NHL)
95	RW	Aleksey Morozov – C	188 cm (6 ft 2 in)	89 kg (196 lb)	16 February 1977	Moscow	(Russia) Ak Bars Kazan (KHL)
8	LW	Alexander Ovechkin – A	188 cm (6 ft 2 in)	108 kg (238 lb)	17 September 1985	Moscow	(United States) Washington Capitals (NHL)
47	RW	Alexander Radulov	185 cm (6 ft 1 in)	85 kg (187 lb)	5 July 1986	Nizhny Tagil	(Russia) Salavat Yulaev Ufa (KHL)
28	LW	Alexander Semin	188 cm (6 ft 2 in)	93 kg (205 lb)	3 March 1984	Krasnoyarsk	(United States) Washington Capitals (NHL)
25	LW	Danis Zaripov	185 cm (6 ft 1 in)	84 kg (185 lb)	26 March 1981	Chelyabinsk	(Russia) Ak Bars Kazan (KHL)
42	C	Sergei Zinovjev	178 cm (5 ft 10 in)	81 kg (179 lb)	4 March 1980	Prokopyevsk	(Russia) Salavat Yulaev Ufa (KHL)

Defencemen Sergei Zubov, Oleg Tverdovsky and Vitali Proshkin, forwards Alexei Kovalev, Alexander Frolov, Nikolai Kulemin and Alexei Tereschenko, and goaltenders Vasiliy Koshechkin and Alexander Eremenko were selected as reserves in case of injury during the tournament.

==== Group play ====
Russia played in Group B.

Round-robin

All times are local (UTC-8).

16 February 2010; 21:00	Russia	8–2 (3–0, 1–0, 4–2)	Latvia	Canada Hockey Place, Vancouver; Attendance: 16,862

Game reference

Evgeni Nabokov
Goalies
Edgars Masaļskis
Referees:
(United States) Dennis LaRue
(Sweden) Marcus Vinnerborg
Linesmen:
(United States) Peter Feola
(Canada) Jay Sharrers

D. Zaripov (S. Fedorov, I. Nikulin) – 2:38	1–0
A. Radulov (S. Fedorov, D. Kalinin) – 7:46	2–0
A. Ovechkin (A. Semin) – 19:25	3–0
E. Malkin (M. Afinogenov, I. Kovalchuk) (PP) – 38:18	4–0
	4–1	40:33 – H. Vasiļjevs (A. Ņiživijs, M. Cipulis)
A. Ovechkin (P. Datsyuk) – 40:59	5–1
D. Zaripov (S. Zinovyev) – 41:30	6–1
I. Kovalchuk (E. Malkin, F. Tyutin) – 43:04	7–1
	7–2	43:35 – Ģ. Ankipāns (J. Sprukts, M. Karsums)
A. Morozov (A. Markov) – 58:57	8–2

10 min
Penalties
16 min
45
Shots
20

18 February 2010; 21:00	Slovakia	2–1 (SO) (0–0, 0–1, 1–0, 0–0, 1–0)	Russia	Canada Hockey Place, Vancouver; Attendance: 17,202

Game reference
Jaroslav Halák	Goalies	Ilya Bryzgalov	Referees: (Switzerland) Danny Kurmann (Canada) Bill McCreary; Linesmen: (Canada) Jay Sharrers (Germany) Felix Winnekens
/ 0–1 / 25:32 – A. Morozov (A. Markov, S. Zinovyev); Mari. Hossa (Demitra, Marc. Hossa) – 49:48 / 1–1			Referees: (Switzerland) Danny Kurmann (Canada) Bill McCreary; Linesmen: (Canada) Jay Sharrers (Germany) Felix Winnekens
J. Stümpel; P. Demitra (miss); Mari. Hossa (miss); J. Stümpel (miss); M. Handzuš (miss); M. Gáborík (miss); P. Demitra	Shootout	(miss) A. Morozov; A. Ovechkin; (miss) P. Datsyuk; (miss) A. Ovechkin; (miss) I. Kovalchuk; (miss) A. Ovechkin; (miss) E. Malkin	Referees: (Switzerland) Danny Kurmann (Canada) Bill McCreary; Linesmen: (Canada) Jay Sharrers (Germany) Felix Winnekens
10 min	Penalties	6 min	Referees: (Switzerland) Danny Kurmann (Canada) Bill McCreary; Linesmen: (Canada) Jay Sharrers (Germany) Felix Winnekens
32	Shots	37	Referees: (Switzerland) Danny Kurmann (Canada) Bill McCreary; Linesmen: (Canada) Jay Sharrers (Germany) Felix Winnekens

21 February 2010; 12:00	Russia	4–2 (1–1, 1–0, 2–1)	Czech Republic	Canada Hockey Place, Vancouver; Attendance: 17,114

Game reference

Evgeni Nabokov
Goalies
Tomáš Vokoun
Referees:
(Canada) Dan O'Halloran
(Canada) Guy Pellerin
Linesmen:
(United States) Peter Feola
(Canada) Jean Morin

E. Malkin (P. Datsyuk, A. Ovechkin) (PP) – 15:13	1–0
	1–1	19:06 – T. Plekanec (P. Eliáš, T. Kaberle) (PP2)
V. Kozlov (A. Radulov, S. Fedorov) – 34:34	2–1
E. Malkin (A. Semin, F. Tyutin) – 41:49	3–1
	3–2	54:51 – M. Michálek (M. Židlický, M. Blaťák)
P. Datsyuk (E. Malkin, A. Ovechkin) (EN) – 59:47	4–2

12 min
Penalties
6 min
31
Shots
25

Standings

Team	Pld	W	OTW	OTL	L	GF	GA	GD	Pts	Qualification
Russia	3	2	0	1	0	13	6	+7	7	Quarterfinals
Czech Republic	3	2	0	0	1	10	7	+3	6	
Slovakia	3	1	1	0	1	9	4	+5	5	
Latvia	3	0	0	0	3	4	19	−15	0	

Source: IIHF

==== Final rounds ====
Quarterfinal

24 February 2010; 16:30	Russia	3–7 (1–4, 2–3, 0–0)	Canada	Canada Hockey Place, Vancouver; Attendance: 17,740

Game reference

Evgeni Nabokov (out 24:07) / Ilya Bryzgalov (in 24:07)
Goalies
Roberto Luongo
Referees:
(United States) Dennis LaRue
(Sweden) Marcus Vinnerborg
Linesmen:
(United States) Thor Nelson
(Slovakia) Milan Novak

	0–1	2:21 – R. Getzlaf (D. Boyle, C. Pronger)
	0–2	12:09 – D. Boyle (D. Heatley, P. Marleau) (PP)
	0–3	12:55 – R. Nash (J. Toews, M. Richards)
D. Kalinin (A. Volchenkov, S. Fedorov) – 14:39	1–3
	1–4	18:18 – B. Morrow (D. Boyle, D. Keith)
	1–5	23:10 – C. Perry (R. Getzlaf, D. Keith)
	1–6	24:07 – S. Weber (J. Toews, J. Iginla)
M. Afinogenov (I. Kovalchuk, D. Grebeshkov) – 24:46	2–6
	2–7	29:51 – C. Perry (E. Staal, R. Getzlaf)
S. Gonchar (E. Malkin) (PP) – 31:40	3–7

10 min
Penalties
10 min
28
Shots
42

=== Women's tournament ===
Roster

The following is the Russian roster in the women's ice hockey tournament of the 2010 Winter Olympics.

Head coach: (Russia) Valentin Gureev Assistant coach: (Russia) Alexei Chistyakov

No.	Pos.	Name	Height	Weight	Birthdate	Birthplace	2009–10 team
1	G	Anna Prugova	1.74 m (5 ft 9 in)	62 kg (137 lb)	20 November 1993	Khabarovsk	(Russia) Tornado Dmitrov
4	D	Alena Khomich	1.68 m (5 ft 6 in)	55 kg (121 lb)	26 February 1981	Pervouralsk, Soviet Union	(Russia) SKIF Nizhny Novgorod
7	F	Olga Sosina	1.60 m (5 ft 3 in)	66 kg (146 lb)	27 July 1992	Almetyevsk	(Russia) SKIF Nizhny Novgorod
8	F	Iya Gavrilova – A	1.73 m (5 ft 8 in)	67 kg (148 lb)	3 September 1987	Krasnoyarsk, Soviet Union	(Russia) Tornado Dmitrov
9	F	Alexandra Vafina	1.68 m (5 ft 6 in)	57 kg (126 lb)	28 July 1990	Almaty, Kazakh SSR, Soviet Union	(Russia) Fakel Chelyabinsk
11	F	Marina Sergina	1.68 m (5 ft 6 in)	68 kg (150 lb)	2 March 1986	Polyarnye Zori, Soviet Union	(Russia) Tornado Dmitrov
13	D	Kristina Petrovskaya	1.70 m (5 ft 7 in)	64 kg (141 lb)	3 June 1980	Moscow, Soviet Union	(Russia) Tornado Dmitrov
15	D	Olga Permyakova – A	1.71 m (5 ft 7 in)	67 kg (148 lb)	12 April 1982	Chelyabinsk, Soviet Union	(Russia) Tornado Dmitrov
17	F	Yekaterina Smolentseva – C	1.76 m (5 ft 9 in)	65 kg (143 lb)	15 September 1981	Pervouralsk, Soviet Union	(Russia) Tornado Dmitrov
20	G	Irina Gashennikova	1.64 m (5 ft 5 in)	66 kg (146 lb)	11 May 1975	Pushkino, Soviet Union	(Russia) Tornado Dmitrov
22	F	Yulia Deulina	1.73 m (5 ft 8 in)	62 kg (137 lb)	14 April 1984	Krasnogorsk, Soviet Union	(Russia) SKIF Nizhny Novgorod
23	F	Tatiana Burina	1.65 m (5 ft 5 in)	70 kg (150 lb)	20 March 1980	Novosibirsk, Soviet Union	(Russia) Tornado Dmitrov
25	F	Yekaterina Lebedeva	1.66 m (5 ft 5 in)	66 kg (146 lb)	14 September 1989	Sverdlovsk, Soviet Union	(Russia) Dinamo Yekaterinburg
26	D	Zoya Polunina	1.70 m (5 ft 7 in)	65 kg (143 lb)	12 June 1991	Bogoroditsk, Soviet Union	(Russia) Tornado Dmitrov
28	F	Svetlana Terentieva	1.63 m (5 ft 4 in)	69 kg (152 lb)	25 September 1983	Pervouralsk, Soviet Union	(Russia) SKIF Nizhny Novgorod
29	F	Tatiana Sotnikova	1.67 m (5 ft 6 in)	59 kg (130 lb)	20 January 1981	Moscow, Soviet Union	(Russia) SKIF Nizhny Novgorod
30	G	Mariya Onolbayeva	1.78 m (5 ft 10 in)	78 kg (172 lb)	25 December 1978	Murmansk, Soviet Union	(Russia) Fakel Chelyabinsk
34	D	Svetlana Tkacheva	1.70 m (5 ft 7 in)	63 kg (139 lb)	3 November 1984	Moscow, Soviet Union	(Russia) SKIF Nizhny Novgorod
44	D	Alexandra Kapustina	1.66 m (5 ft 5 in)	74 kg (163 lb)	7 April 1984	Pervouralsk, Soviet Union	(Russia) SKIF Nizhny Novgorod
91	F	Yekaterina Ananina	1.72 m (5 ft 8 in)	62 kg (137 lb)	13 June 1991	Sverdlovsk, Soviet Union	(Russia) Spartak-Merkury Yekaterinburg
95	D	Inna Dyubanok	1.66 m (5 ft 5 in)	63 kg (139 lb)	20 February 1990	Mozhaysk, Soviet Union	(Russia) Tornado Dmitrov

==== Group play ====
Russia played in Group B.

Round-robin

All times are local (UTC-8).

14 February 2010; 16:30	Finland	5–1 (1–1, 2–0, 2–0)	Russia	UBC Winter Sports Centre, Vancouver; Attendance: 5,275

Game reference

Noora Räty
Goalies
Irina Gashennikova
Referee:
Mary Anne Gage (Canada)
Linesmen:
Heather Richardson (Canada)
Kerry Rumble (Canada)

	0–1	6:11 – Vafina (Burina) (PP)
Sirviö (Saarinen, Välimäki) (PP2) – 9:30	1–1
Voutilainen (Rantamäki) – 23:59	2–1
Hovi (Hiirikoski) – 37:36	3–1
Tikkinen (S. Tuominen, Karvinen) – 42:25	4–1
Tikkinen (Pelttari, Karvinen) (PP) – 49:32	5–1

14 min
Penalties
12 min
34
Shots
14

16 February 2010; 14:30	Russia	0–13 (0–5, 0–7, 0–1)	United States	UBC Winter Sports Centre, Vancouver; Attendance: 5,365

Game reference

Anna Prugova (out 31:00)
Mariya Onolbayeva (in 31:00)
Goalies
Jessie Vetter
Referee:
Nicole Hertrich (Germany)
Linesmen:
Annica Flöden (Sweden)
Heather Richardson (Canada)

0–1	2:19 – M. Lamoureux (J. Lamoureux, Stack)
0–2	5:48 – Potter (Knight) (SH)
0–3	9:54 – Thatcher (Potter, Knight)
0–4	12:57 – Cahow (Stack, Darwitz) (PP)
0–5	15:56 – Potter (Knight) (PP)
0–6	20:34 – Ruggiero (Chu, Darwitz) (PP)
0–7	23:16 – Stack (M. Lamoureux) (PP)
0–8	26:01 – J. Lamoureux (Darwitz)
0–9	27:50 – Darwitz (Cahow) (PP)
0–10	31:00 – Darwitz (Knight) (SH)
0–11	31:46 – Potter (Thatcher, Bellamy)
0–12	33:32 – Engstrom (Chesson) (PP)
0–13	41:05 – Chesson (Stack) (PP)

16 min
Penalties
10 min
7
Shots
34

18 February 2010; 19:00	China	1–2 (0–0, 1–2, 0–0)	Russia	UBC Winter Sports Centre, Vancouver; Attendance: 5,391

Game reference

Shi Yao
Goalies
Irina Gashennikova
Referee:
Mary Anne Gage (Canada)
Linesmen:
Meghan Margaret Hishmeh (United States)
Anna Majapuro (Finland)

	0–1	24:23 – Smolentseva (Kapustina, Khomich)
	0–2	36:02 – Sergina (Burina, Permyakova) (PP)
Jin (Sun) – 37:38	1–2

4 min
Penalties
12 min
22
Shots
39

Standings

Team	Pld	W	OTW	OTL	L	GF	GA	GD	Pts	Qualification
United States	3	3	0	0	0	31	1	+30	9	Semifinals
Finland	3	2	0	0	1	7	8	−1	6	Semifinals
Russia	3	1	0	0	2	3	19	−16	3	5–8th classification
China	3	0	0	0	3	3	16	−13	0	5–8th classification

Source: ESPN

==== Final rounds ====
Fifth place semifinal

20 February 2010; 19:00	Russia	4–2 (2–0, 1–1, 1–1)	Slovakia	UBC Winter Sports Centre, Vancouver; Attendance: 5,488

Game reference

Irina Gashennikova
Goalies
Zuzana Tomčíková
Referee:
Aina Høve (Norway)
Linesmen:
Annica Flöden (Sweden)
Kerry Rumble (Canada)

Sotnikova (Lebedeva) – 7:34	1–0
Gavrilova (Sergina, Smolentseva) (PP) – 18:16	2–0
	2–1	23:24 – Pravlíková (Veličková) (PP)
Terentieva (Kapustina, Dyubanok) (SH) – 33:45	3–1
	3–2	40:31 – Kapustová (Veličková)
Gavrilova (PP) – 50:26	4–2

8 min
Penalties
8 min
43
Shots
19

Fifth place game

22 February 2010; 19:00	Switzerland	2–1 GWS (0–1, 1–0, 0–0) (OT: 0–0) (SO: 1–0)	Russia	UBC Winter Sports Centre, Vancouver; Attendance: 5,412

Game reference
Florence Schelling	Goalies	Irina Gashennikova	Referee: Ulla Sipilä (Finland); Linesmen: Zuzana Arazimová (Czech Republic); Kerry Rumble (Canada)
/ 0–1 / 9:05 – Burina (Sergina, Permyakova) (PP); S. Marty (Nussbaum, Meier) (PP) – 34:12 / 1–1			Referee: Ulla Sipilä (Finland); Linesmen: Zuzana Arazimová (Czech Republic); Kerry Rumble (Canada)
Lehmann (miss); Bullo; S. Marty	Shootout	Sosina; (miss) Gavrilova; (miss) Deulina	Referee: Ulla Sipilä (Finland); Linesmen: Zuzana Arazimová (Czech Republic); Kerry Rumble (Canada)
10 min	Penalties	16 min	Referee: Ulla Sipilä (Finland); Linesmen: Zuzana Arazimová (Czech Republic); Kerry Rumble (Canada)
27	Shots	33	Referee: Ulla Sipilä (Finland); Linesmen: Zuzana Arazimová (Czech Republic); Kerry Rumble (Canada)

== Luge ==
Athlete	Event	Final					
Athlete	Event	Run 1	Run 2	Run 3	Run 4	Total	Rank
Albert Demtschenko	Men's singles	48.590	48.579	48.769	48.467	3:14.405	4
Viktor Kneib	Men's singles	48.899	48.862	49.224	48.747	3:15.272	12
Stepan Fedorov	Men's singles	49.214	48.859	49.123	49.021	3:16.217	19
Alexandra Rodionova	Women's singles	41.828	41.731	41.984	41.913	2:47.456	6
Tatiana Ivanova	Women's singles	41.816	41.601	41.914	41.850	2:47.181	4
Natalia Khoreva	Women's singles	41.932	41.785	42.175	42.092	2:47.984	10
Vladislav Yuzhakov; Vladimir Makhnutin	Doubles	41.798	41.948			1:23.746	10
Mikhail Kuzmich; Stanislav Mikheev	Doubles	42.174	41.981			1:24.155	14

== Nordic combined ==
Athlete	Event	Ski jumping		Cross-country		
Athlete	Event	Points	Rank	Deficit	Time	Rank
Sergej Maslennikov	Normal hill	111.5	32	+1:36	+3:42.2	42
Sergej Maslennikov	Large hill	101.2	21	+1:43	+3:52.8	36
Niyaz Nabeev	Large hill	95.3	26	+2:07	+5:09.7	43

== Short track speed skating ==
Athlete	Event	Heat		Quarterfinal		Semifinal		Final		Ranking
Athlete	Event	Time	Rank	Time	Rank	Time	Rank	Time	Rank	Ranking
Semion Elistratov	Men's 1500 metres	2:15.455	4			did not advance				24
Semion Elistratov	Men's 1000 metres	1:27.254	3	did not advance						24
Semion Elistratov	Men's 500 metres	42.982	3	did not advance						24
Ruslan Zakharov	Men's 1500 metres	2:14.929	6			did not advance				31
Ruslan Zakharov	Men's 1000 metres	1:26.883	4	did not advance						29
Ruslan Zakharov	Men's 500 metres	43.207	4	did not advance						27
Valeriya Potemkina	Women's 500 metres	44.952	4	did not advance						25
Valeriya Potemkina	Women's 1500 metres	2:28.405	5			did not advance				27
Valeriya Potemkina	Women's 1000 metres	1:36.438	4	did not advance						26
Nina Yevteyeva	Women's 1500 metres	2:24.277	3 Q			2:25.414	6	did not advance		16
Nina Yevteyeva	Women's 1000 metres	1:31.302	4	did not advance						24
Olga Belyakova	Women's 1500 metres	2:26.762	6			did not advance				30

== Skeleton ==
Athlete	Event	Final					
Athlete	Event	Run 1	Run 2	Run 3	Run 4	Total	Rank
Aleksandr Tretyakov	Men's	52.70	53.05	52.3	52.7	3:30.75	3rd place, bronze medalist(s)
Sergey Chudinov	Men's	53.64	53.26	53.13	52.92	3:32.95	12
Svetlana Trunova	Women's	56.47	55.32	55.23	55.77	3:42.19	16
Elena Yudina	Women's	55.42	56.06	55.54	55.17	3:42.79	18

== Ski jumping ==
Athlete	Event	Qualifying		First round		Final		
Athlete	Event	Points	Rank	Points	Rank	Points	Total	Rank
Dimitry Ipatov	Normal hill	113.5	33 Q	102.5	46	did not advance		46
Dimitry Ipatov	Large hill	102.0	37 Q	63.9	47	did not advance		47
Pavel Karelin	Normal hill	116.5	27 Q	111.5	33	did not advance		33
Pavel Karelin	Large hill	119.3	24 Q	80.2	38	did not advance		38
Denis Kornilov	Normal hill	117.0	26 Q	118.5	22 Q	114.0	232.5	26
Denis Kornilov	Large hill	127.6	14 Q	85.2	35	did not advance		35
Ilya Rosliakov	Normal hill	104.5	45	did not advance				
Ilya Rosliakov	Large hill	101.1	38 Q	73.9	44	did not advance		44
Pavel Karelin; Denis Kornilov; Ilya Rosliakov; Dimitry Ipatov	Team			414.1	10	did not advance		10

== Snowboarding ==
Parallel GS

Athlete	Event	Qualification		Round of 16	Quarterfinals	Semifinals	Finals	
Athlete	Event	Time	Rank	Opposition time	Opposition time	Opposition time	Opposition time	Rank
Ekaterina Tudegesheva	Women's parallel giant slalom	1:23.72	5 Q	Kober (GER) (12); L DSQ	did not advance			10
Ekaterina Ilyukhina	Women's parallel giant slalom	1:23.43	4 Q	Gorgone (USA) (13); W -0.21	Kober (GER) (12); W DSQ	Kreiner (AUT) (1); W -0.14	Sauerbreij (NED) (2); L +0.23	2nd place, silver medalist(s)
Alena Zavarzina	Women's parallel giant slalom	1:25.51	17	did not advance				17
Svetlana Boldykova	Women's parallel giant slalom	1:26.66	24	did not advance				24
Stanislav Detkov	Men's parallel giant slalom	1:18.29	11 Q	Lambert (CAN) (6); W -12.05	Schoch (SUI) (3); W DSQ	Anderson (CAN) (10); L +1.72	Bronze medal final Bozzetto (FRA) (9); L DSQ	4

Snowboard cross

Athlete	Event	Qualifying		Round of 16	Quarterfinals	Semifinals	Finals	Rank
Athlete	Event	Time	Rank	Position	Position	Position	Position	Rank
Andrey Boldykov	Men's snowboard cross	1:23.28	20 Q	Novotny (CZE) (29); Schiavon (ITA) (13) de Le Rue (FRA) (4); 1 Q	Fuchs (AUT) (5); Gruener (AUT) (12); Novotny (CZE) (13); 3	did not advance		15

== Speed skating ==
Men

Athlete	Event	Race 1		Final	
Athlete	Event	Time	Rank	Time	Rank
Yevgeny Lalenkov	500 metres	36.420	36	73.03	36
Yevgeny Lalenkov	1000 metres			1:10.14	11
Yevgeny Lalenkov	1500 metres			1:47.06	11
Aleksandr Lebedev	500 metres	36.144	30	72.42	32
Aleksandr Lebedev	1000 metres			1:12.78	38
Aleksandr Lebedev	1500 metres			1:52.09	36
Dmitry Lobkov	500 metres	35.133	8	70.46	14
Dmitry Lobkov	1000 metres			1:10.795	21
Aleksandr Rumyantsev	5000 metres			DSQ	
Aleksandr Rumyantsev	10000 metres			13:45.77	13
Ivan Skobrev	5000 metres			6:18.05	3rd place, bronze medalist(s)
Ivan Skobrev	1500 metres			1:46.42	4
Ivan Skobrev	10000 metres			13:02.07	2nd place, silver medalist(s)
Timofey Skopin	500 metres	36.482	37	72.94	35
Aleksey Yesin	1000 metres			1:10.797	22
Aleksey Yesin	1500 metres			1:48.65	21

Women

Athlete	Event	Race 1		Final	
Athlete	Event	Time	Rank	Time	Rank
Yekaterina Abramova	1500 metres			2:03.19	32
Olga Fatkulina	500 metres	39.359	24	78.43	20
Olga Fatkulina	1000 metres			1:18.13	20
Svetlana Kaykan	500 metres	39.422	27	78.63	22
Galina Likhachova	3000 metres			4:17.63	20
Yekaterina Lobysheva	1000 metres			1:18.785	28
Yekaterina Lobysheva	1500 metres			1:59.01	11
Yekaterina Malysheva	500 metres	39.782	32	78.72	24
Yekaterina Malysheva	1000 metres			1:18.56	27
Yulia Nemaya	500 metres	38.594	7	did not finish	
Alla Shabanova	1500 metres			1:59.35	12
Yekaterina Shikhova	1000 metres			1:17.46	11
Yekaterina Shikhova	1500 metres			1:58.54	8
Svetlana Vysokova	3000 metres			4:16.91	18
Svetlana Vysokova	5000 metres			7:23.33	13

Team pursuit

Athlete	Event	Quarterfinal	Semifinal	Final	
Athlete	Event	Opposition time	Opposition time	Opposition time	Rank
Galina Likhachova; Yekaterina Lobysheva; Alla Shabanova; Yekaterina Shikhova	Women's team pursuit	Poland; L +1.96	did not advance	Final D South Korea; W -0.49	7

== See also ==
- Russia at the 2010 Winter Paralympics
