= Shannon Bahrke =

American freestyle skier

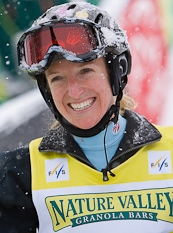

Personal information
- Born: November 7, 1980 (age 45) Reno, Nevada, U.S.
- Website: www.shannonbahrke.com

Skiing career
- Sport: Alpine skiing
- Club: Olympic Valley Freestyle
- Retired: July 27, 2010
- Disciplines: Moguls, Dual Moguls
- World Cup debut: January 9, 1999

Olympics
- Teams: 3 (2002, 2006, 2010)
- Medals: 2 (2002 Silver, 2010 Bronze) (0 gold)

World Championships
- Teams: 9
- Medals: 2 (2003 Bronze, 2007 Silver) (0 gold)

World Cup
- Seasons: 12
- Wins: 7
- Podiums: 24
- Overall titles: N/A
- Discipline titles: 1 (2003)
Medal record
Women's freestyle skiing
Representing the United States
Olympic Games
Silver medal – second place	2002 Salt Lake City	Moguls
Bronze medal – third place	2010 Vancouver	Moguls
World Championships
Silver medal – second place	2007 Madonna di Campiglio	Dual Moguls
Bronze medal – third place	2003 Deer Valley	Dual Moguls

Shannon Bahrke (born November 7, 1980) is an American Olympic freestyle skier and entrepreneur. Bahrke was the silver medalist in Moguls at the 2002 Winter Olympics held in Salt Lake City and went on to become the 2003 World Cup Champion. She also won the bronze medal at the 2010 Winter Olympics in Vancouver. With her bronze medal in 2010, she became the first US women's freestyle skier to win multiple Olympic medals. Bahrke was also the 2009 US National Champion in dual moguls. She has reached the podium twice at the FIS Freestyle World Ski Championships, winning bronze in 2003 and silver in 2007, both in dual moguls.

In 2008, she founded Silver Bean Coffee, a Salt Lake City based coffee roasting company. She sold Silver Bean Coffee in 2015 and founded Team Empower Hour, a corporate team-building and inspiration company.

== Early life and family ==
Bahrke was born in Reno, Nevada, to Dick and Trilla Bahrke and raised in Tahoe City, California. The Bahrke family name originates in Norway; her paternal grandparents are from a town near Oslo. She began skiing at the age of three and skied different resorts around Lake Tahoe while growing up. When she was 13, she was discovered by the coach of the freestyle team at Squaw Valley Ski Resort, and he eventually convinced her to join the team. Besides skiing, Bahrke also participated in soccer, softball and track and played trumpet in her high school bands.

After high school, at the age of 18, she moved to Salt Lake City to attend the University of Utah as well as to pursue her dreams of making the U.S. Ski Team. In December 1998, she earned a spot on the U.S. Freestyle Ski Team and continued to compete on the team for the next 12 years.

Her younger brother, Scotty Bahrke, also competed with the US Freestyle Team as an aerialist. He joined the US Olympic Team for the 2010 Winter Games in Vancouver on short notice, replacing teammate Dylan Ferguson who was recovering from an emergency appendectomy shortly before the Games began.

Bahrke is married to longtime boyfriend Matt Happe, with whom she co-founded Silver Bean Coffee Company in 2013. She announced that following the 2010 Olympics, she would retire from competition, wed Happe on October 10, 2010 (10/10/10), and concentrate on their business. They have two children.

== Skiing career ==
After being selected to the US team in December 1998, Bahrke's first World Cup appearance was at Mont-Tremblant, Quebec in January 1999; six weeks later she reached her first podium with a second-place finish in dual moguls at Madarao in Japan. She went on to place fifth in dual moguls at the 1999 World Ski Championships. From 1999 through the 2001–2002 season, Bahrke reached the podium at seven World Cup events, including two victories.

In 2002, Bahrke was selected to the US Olympic Team for the Salt Lake Olympic Games. She won the silver medal, and was the first of 34 American medalists at the 2002 Games. After the 2002 Olympics, Bahrke went on to win the 2003 World Cup Championship. At the 2003 Deer Valley World Ski Championships, she won the bronze medal in dual moguls, and finished fourth in moguls, missing the podium by 34 hundredths of a point.

Bahrke's career was interrupted by injuries beginning in February 2004 when she suffered a broken jaw during a World Cup event in Japan, ending her season. Then, while training for the second event of the 2004–2005 season, she sustained a serious injury to her right knee, with a torn ACL, a partially torn MCL and damage to the meniscus.

Returning to the slopes in December 2005, she qualified for a spot on the US Team for the 2006 Winter Olympics in Turin where she finished in tenth place, the top US result. Bahrke then returned to form during the 2007 season, winning dual moguls silver at the Madonna di Campiglio World Championships, and placing second in World Cup standings for the season. Prior to the beginning of the 2007–2008 season, she suffered another season-ending knee injury.

She came back from injury once again, and in March 2009 won the dual moguls title at the US National Freestyle Championships, her sixth US title. Bahrke dedicated the win to her longtime coach Clay Beck, who died in a 2008 plane accident. After a third-place finish at the December 2009 Olympic trials, her status for the 2010 Winter Olympics would be determined at the end of January 2010 following the World Cup events. She was one of four women selected to the US Moguls Team for the Vancouver Games, along with Hannah Kearney, Heather McPhie, and Michelle Roark. Bahrke was the only past Olympic medalist on the 18-strong US Freestyle Team.

Bahrke won the bronze medal in the women's moguls freestyle skiing event at the Vancouver Olympics. She was in first place after her run with a score of 25.43, with 5 skiers left. Teammate Heather McPhie fell on her run, as did Canadian skier Kristi Richards. Jennifer Heil, the penultimate skier, scored a 25.69, pushing Bahrke to second place, and second time Olympian Hannah Kearney's gold medal winning run 26.63 dropped Bahrke to bronze and Heil to silver.

== Corporate career ==
While recovering from her 2007 knee injury, Bahrke and her fiancé Matt Happe founded a coffee roasting company in Salt Lake City called Silver Bean Coffee. In addition to ski-themed coffee blends, the company also sells coffees to support US ski team members and their charities. Over 20 US skiers, including 2006 Olympic giant slalom gold medalist Julia Mancuso and 2009 Nordic combined world champion Bill Demong have their own coffees, and a portion of the proceeds goes to the athlete and their charity of choice. Silver Bean also sells Best Friend Blends; for every bag of these coffees, five dollars go to Bahrke's charity of choice, the Best Friends Animal Society. Bharke sold the company in the year 2015.

Bahrke now works as a Ski Champion for Deer Valley. She has been a keynote speaker for companies and organizations all around the globe. To support fellow Olympians and motivate other people, she launched a corporate team-building and inspiration company called Team Empower Hour. She is the Chief Inspiration Olympian of the company that is based out of Salt Lake City and Park City.

== Other interests ==
Bahrke is active in motorsports as well. She holds a wheel-to-wheel racing license with NASA and Miller Motor Sports park. She currently races in the Spec Miata Class. She is an avid off-road motorcyclist featured on the cover of American Motorcyclist Magazine in March 2010. In 2011, Bahrke appeared in the Visit California promotional film aimed at boosting tourism from the UK.

== Books ==
Bahrke is the author of a children's book titled "Mommy, Why Is Your Hair Pink?"(ASIN B07BT1P273) which is about her life story and sports journey.
