= Yun Chae-rin =

South Korean freestyle skier

Personal information
- Nationality: South Korean
- Born: 16 October 1990 (age 34)

Sport
- Sport: Freestyle skiing

Yun Chae-rin (born 16 October 1990) is a South Korean freestyle skier. She competed in the women's moguls event at the 2006 Winter Olympics.
