= Nicole Parks =

Australian freestyle skier

Personal information
- Born: 11 July 1992 (age 33) Cooma, Australia
- Height: 5 ft 6 in (168 cm)
- Weight: 128 lb (58 kg)
- Parents: Andrew Parks (father); Josephine Buhagiar (mother)

Sport
- Country: Australia
- Sport: Freestyle skiing
Medal record
Representing Australia

Nicole Parks (born 11 July 1992) is an Australian freestyle skier. She competed at the 2014 Winter Olympics in Sochi, where she qualified for the moguls finals, retired from competition skiing in 2017, and is now a coach.

== Family ==
Nicole Parks was born on 11 July 1992 in Cooma, a town in the south of New South Wales, Australia. Her father, Andrew Parks, is Australian and a skier who loved to ski moguls. Her mother, Josephine Buhagiar, was originally from Ghajnsielem, which is a municipality on the southeastern coast of the island of Gozo in Malta. At the time of the 2014 Winter Olympics, Parks lived in Jindabyne, New South Wales.

== Skiing before Sochi ==
Nicole Parks' parents enrolled her in the Winter Sports Club Program when she was seven years old. At seventeen, she competed in her first World Cup, and came 31st. This was one place too low to compete in the 2010 Winter Olympics in Vancouver.

In February 2011, Parks did not finish the course when she competed in the women's moguls qualifications for the World Ski Championships at Deer Valley (USA). She came 19th in the qualifications for the dual moguls.

In March 2013, Parks came 18th in the women's moguls qualifications for the World Ski Championships at Myrkdalen-Voss (Norway), and came 18th in the final. In the dual moguls, she came 16th in the qualifications, and 16th in the first round of the finals.

== 2014 Winter Olympics ==
Parks landed heavily and fell on a jump in practice at the Rosa Khutor Extreme Park in Krasnaya Polyana near Sochi (Russia) on Tuesday 4 February 2014, breaking the lenses of her sports glasses, but was not hurt. Parks said: "I just landed a bit forward and caught an edge that was a bit soft. One ski went one way and I rolled over. Everyone does that at least once in training. I broke my lenses but I have plenty of them. I came prepared." There were several competitors in different sports who were injured on the site. She participated in the ladies' moguls event over three rounds:

- Parks came 17th out of 30 skiers in the first qualification round on Thursday 6 February 2014, the day before the opening ceremony for the games. The top ten qualified for the final.
- Parks came 8th out of 20 in the second qualification round on Saturday 8 February 2014. Again, the top ten qualified for the final.
- Parks came 15th out of 20 in the first round of the final on Saturday 8 February 2014. Only the top 12 qualified for the second round of the final.

== Skiing after Sochi ==
In January 2015, Parks came 23rd in the first round of qualifications for the World Ski Championships at Kreischberg (Austria). But Parks did not finish the course in the second round of qualifications, and so came 29th overall.

In early 2015, Parks injured her knee. She suffered an anterior cruciate ligament injury, tore her meniscus, and fractured her tibia and fibula. She managed to compete in the latter end of the 2015/16 World Cup competition.

== Coach ==
Parks competed as a mogul skier for 13 years, before she retired in 2017 to become a coach. In 2022, Parks was one of 31 coaches in different sports given a paid two-year apprenticeship as part of the inaugural National Generation 2032 Coach Program in preparation for the 2032 Brisbane Olympic and Paralympic Games.
