= Stéphanie St-Pierre =

Canadian freestyle skier

Personal information
- Born: August 2, 1985 (age 40) Victoriaville, Quebec, Canada
- Website: www.stephaniestpierre.com
Medal record
Women's freestyle skiing
Representing Canada
World Championships
Bronze medal – third place	2003 Deer Valley	Moguls

Stéphanie St-Pierre (born August 2, 1985) is a Canadian freestyle skier. St-Pierre competes in moguls.

Born in Victoriaville, Quebec, St-Pierre made her World Cup debut in January 2002 at Tignes. Her first World Cup podium came at Fernie, British Columbia in 2003, where she won a dual moguls event.

Over her career, St-Pierre has earned eight podium places at World Cup events, with two of these being victories. Her most successful season came in 2007, when she placed 5th overall in the World Cup standings. She also won a bronze medal at the 2003 World Championships in Deer Valley.

St-Pierre competed at the 2006 Winter Olympics. She finished 17th in the opening round of the women's moguls, good enough to advance in the final. In the final, she improved her score to end up 12th overall.

== World Cup podiums ==
Date	Location	Rank
January 25, 2003	Fernie	1st place, gold medalist(s)
December 20, 2003	Madonna di Campiglio	3rd place, bronze medalist(s)
January 10, 2004	Mont Tremblant	1st place, gold medalist(s)
January 17, 2004	Lake Placid	3rd place, bronze medalist(s)
February 18, 2005	Sauze d'Oulx	2nd place, silver medalist(s)
January 20, 2006	Lake Placid	2nd place, silver medalist(s)
February 17, 2007	Inawashiro	3rd place, bronze medalist(s)
March 3, 2007	Voss	3rd place, bronze medalist(s)
