= Šárka Razýmová =

Czech freestyle skier (born 1986)

Personal information
- Born: Šárka Sudová; 23 January 1986 (age 40) Jablonec nad Nisou, Czechoslovakia

Sport
- Sport: Skiing

Šárka Razýmová (née Sudová; born 23 January 1986) is a Czech writer and journalist. She is also a former freestyle skier, representing the Czech Republic at the 2006 and 2010 Winter Olympics in mogul skiing.

== Personal life ==
Šárka Sudová was born on 23 January 1986 in Jablonec nad Nisou. She is the younger sister of Nikola Sudová. She studied business economics on Technical University of Liberec.

She married Czech skier Aleš Razým. They have two children, Thea-Nina and Kryštof. As of 2020, she still lives in Jablonec nad Nisou.

== Skiing career ==
Sudová made her World Cup debut in December 2003. She competed at the 2006 and 2010 Winter Olympics for the Czech Republic. Her best finish came in 2010, when she placed 25th in the qualifying round of the moguls, failing to advance to the final. In 2006, she finished 26th in the preliminary round, and did not advance.

Her best showing at the World Championships is 17th, in the dual moguls event in 2005 and 2007.

Her best World Cup event finish is 16th place, at Voss in 2006–07. In the same season, she recorded her best World Cup overall finish in moguls, which was 26th.

In 2011, Sudová decided to end her career. She originally wanted to quit after the 2010–11 season, but due to an injury in training, she did not finish the season. She skied moguls for 15 years.

== Work after sports career ==
From 2012, after ending her sports career, she worked as a sports journalist. She worked for the Czech Radio, but she also cooperates with Mladá fronta Dnes and with SKI magazín. She sometimes helps out as an assistant coach of Czech acrobatic skiers. She also worked as a communications manager for the Ski Association of the Czech Republic. As of 2024, she works as a PR manager and occasional TV presenter.

In 2015, Šárka Sudová and her husband Aleš Razým (then still a boyfriend) wrote a travelogue called Lyžnící v Karibiku ("Skiers in the Caribbean"). She is the author of many feuilletons. She contributed to the books Zlatý a bronzový Vancouver ("Golden and Bronze Vancouver") and Naše hory, lyže a sníh ("Our Mountains, Skis and Snow").
