= Sara Kjellin =

Swedish freestyle skier

Personal information
- Born: 16 December 1977 (age 48) Undersåker, Sweden

Sport
- Country: Sweden
- Sport: Freestyle skiing

Sara Kjellin (born 16 December 1977) is a Swedish freestyle skier. She was born in Undersåker in Åre Municipality. She competed at the 2006 Winter Olympics, where she placed fourth in women's moguls. She also at the 1998 Winter Olympics and 2002 Winter Olympics.
