= Nuria Montané =

Spanish freestyle skier

Personal information
- Nationality: Spanish
- Born: 16 January 1982 (age 43); La Seu d'Urgell, Spain

Sport
- Sport: Freestyle skiing

Nuria Montané (born 16 January 1982) is a Spanish freestyle skier. She competed in the women's moguls event at the 2006 Winter Olympics.
