= Speed skating at the 2010 Winter Olympics – Men's 10,000 metres =

Speed skating at the Olympics

Men's 10,000 metres at the XXI Olympic Winter Games
- Venue: Richmond Olympic Oval
- Date: 23 February 2010
- Competitors: 15 from 9 nations
- Winning time: 12:58.55

Medalists
1st place, gold medalist(s)		Lee Seung-hoon	South Korea
2nd place, silver medalist(s)		Ivan Skobrev	Russia
3rd place, bronze medalist(s)		Bob de Jong	Netherlands

The men's 10,000 metres speed skating competition of the Vancouver 2010 Olympics was held at Richmond Olympic Oval on 23 February 2010.

The overwhelming pre-race favorite Sven Kramer, who had won 18 consecutive 10,000 m races since 2006, was disqualified due to a missed lane change after 6600 m into the race. Kramer finished the race in a time of 12:54.50, under the impression that he had won the gold medal in a new Olympic and track record, but was then told by his coach, Gerard Kemkers, that he had been disqualified. Kemkers took the blame for the gaffe, as he had directed Kramer into the inner lane, even when Kramer was attempting to take the correct outer lane.

The gold medal instead was won by Lee Seung-hoon in 12:58.55, edging the existing Olympic record by 0.37 seconds. Despite Lee's earlier silver medal at the 5000 m race, his achievement was a surprise, since, before 2010, he had never skated a 10,000 m race under 14 minutes. He broke his personal and the Korean national record, set on 10 January 2010, by 22.5 seconds. Kramer's disqualification allowed Bob de Jong to earn his third Olympic medal on the 10,000 m (he won silver in 1998 and gold in 2006), a feat only equalled by Knut Johannesen, who won silver, gold and bronze at the Olympics in 1956, 1960 and 1964.

== Records ==
Prior to this competition, the existing world and Olympic records were as follows.

World record	Sven Kramer (NED)	12:41.69	Salt Lake City, United States	10 March 2007
Olympic record	Jochem Uytdehaage (NED)	12:58.92	Salt Lake City, United States	22 February 2002

The following new Olympic record was set during this competition.

Date	Round	Athlete	Country	Time	Record
23 February	Pair 5	Lee Seung-hoon	South Korea	12:58.55	OR

OR = Olympic record
The Richmond Olympic Oval track record remained at 12:55.32, set by Sven Kramer on 14 March 2009.

== Results ==
Rank	Pair	Lane	Name	Country	Time	Time behind	Notes
1st place, gold medalist(s)	5	I	Lee Seung-hoon	South Korea	12:58.55	—	OR
2nd place, silver medalist(s)	8	O	Ivan Skobrev	Russia	13:02.07	+3.52	
3rd place, bronze medalist(s)	7	O	Bob de Jong	Netherlands	13:06.73	+8.18	
4	6	I	Alexis Contin	France	13:12.11	+13.56	
5	7	I	Håvard Bøkko	Norway	13:14.92	+16.37	
6	2	O	Sverre Haugli	Norway	13:18.74	+20.19	
7	3	I	Henrik Christiansen	Norway	13:25.65	+27.10	
8	2	I	Jonathan Kuck	United States	13:31.78	+33.23	
9	5	O	Arjen van der Kieft	Netherlands	13:33.37	+34.82	
10	6	O	Marco Weber	Germany	13:35.73	+37.18	
11	4	I	Hiroki Hirako	Japan	13:37.56	+39.01	
12	1	I	Ryan Bedford	United States	13:40.20	+41.65	
13	4	O	Aleksandr Rumyantsev	Russia	13:45.77	+47.22	
14	3	O	Sebastian Druszkiewicz	Poland	13:49.31	+49.40	
	8	I	Sven Kramer	Netherlands	(12:54.50)		DSQ
	-	-	Enrico Fabris	Italy			DNS
