= Sandra Laoura =

French freestyle skier

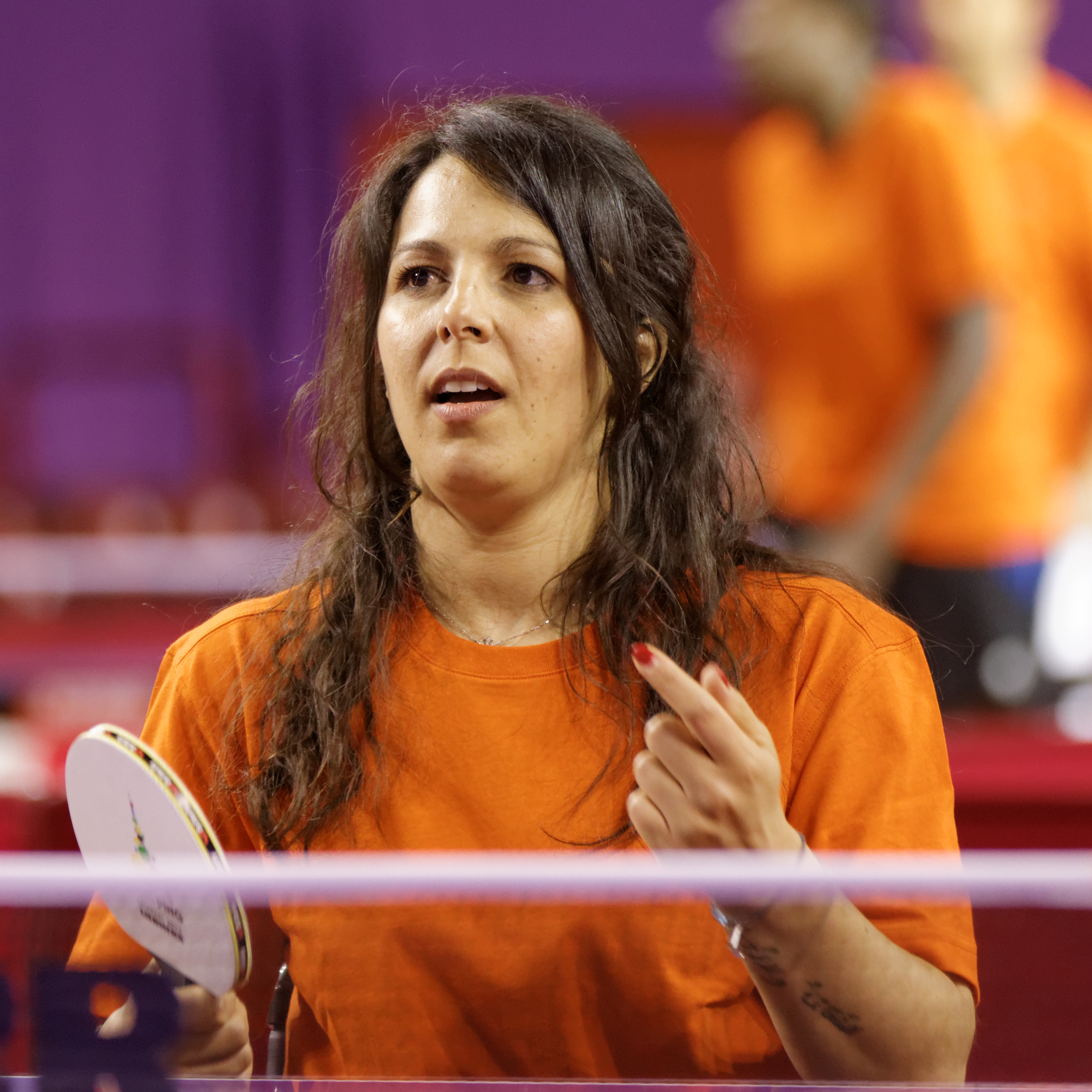

Medal record

Representing France

Freestyle skiing

Olympic Games
Bronze medal – third place	2006 Turin	Moguls

Sandra Laoura (born 21 July 1980 in Constantine, Algeria) is a French freestyle skier of Algerian origin who competed at the 2006 Winter Olympics in Turin, Italy. Laoura won bronze in the women's moguls event.

On 5 January 2007, during a training session for a World Cup event at Mont Gabriel (Quebec, Canada), she landed on her head and fractured two thoracic vertebrae. She underwent surgical intervention aiming to repair the fractured vertebrae, but lost the use of her legs. She traveled to both Portugal and Russia for intensive rehabilitation therapy.
