= Mariangela Parravicini =

Italian freestyle skier

Personal information
- Nationality: Italian
- Born: 7 May 1986 (age 38); Tirano, Italy

Sport
- Sport: Freestyle skiing

Mariangela Parravicini (born 7 May 1986) is an Italian freestyle skier. She competed in the women's moguls event at the 2006 Winter Olympics.
