= Nina Bednarik =

Slovenian freestyle skier (born 1982)

Personal information
- Born: March 12, 1982 (age 44) Škofja Loka, SFR Yugoslavia

Sport
- Sport: Skiing
- Updated on July 24, 2013

Nina Bednarik (born March 12, 1982, in Škofja Loka) is a Slovenian freestyle skier, specializing in Moguls .

Bednarik competed at the 2006 and 2010 Winter Olympics for Slovenia. Her best finish was in 2006, when she placed 24th in the qualifying round of the moguls, failing to advance. In 2010, she placed 26th in the qualifying round of the moguls, again failing to advance.

As of April 2013, her best showing at the World Championships is 9th, in the dual moguls event in 2005 .

Bednarik made her World Cup debut in December 2001. As of April 2013, her best World Cup event finish is 17th place, in a moguls event at Spindelruv Mlyn in 2005/06. Her best World Cup overall finish in moguls is 28th, in 2004/05.
