= Sergey Prudnikov =

Russian bobsledder (born 1985)

Personal information
- Native name: Сергей Александрович Прудников
- Birth name: Sergey Aleksandrovich Prudnikov
- Born: 1 July 1985 (age 39); Oryol, Oryol Oblast, Russia

Sport
- Sport: Bobsled
- Events: Two-man bobsled; Four-man bobsled

Sergey Aleksandrovich Prudnikov (Russian: Сергей Александрович Прудников; born 1 July 1985 in Oryol, Russia) is a Russian bobsledder who has competed since 2007. His best World Cup finish was tied for second in the four-man event at Park City, Utah, on 14 November 2009.

Prudnikov's best finish at the FIBT World Championships was fifth in the mixed team event at Lake Placid, New York, in 2009.

He finished seventh in the two-man event and tied for ninth in the four-man event at the 2010 Winter Olympics in Vancouver.
