= Elena Muratova (skier) =

Russian freestyle skier

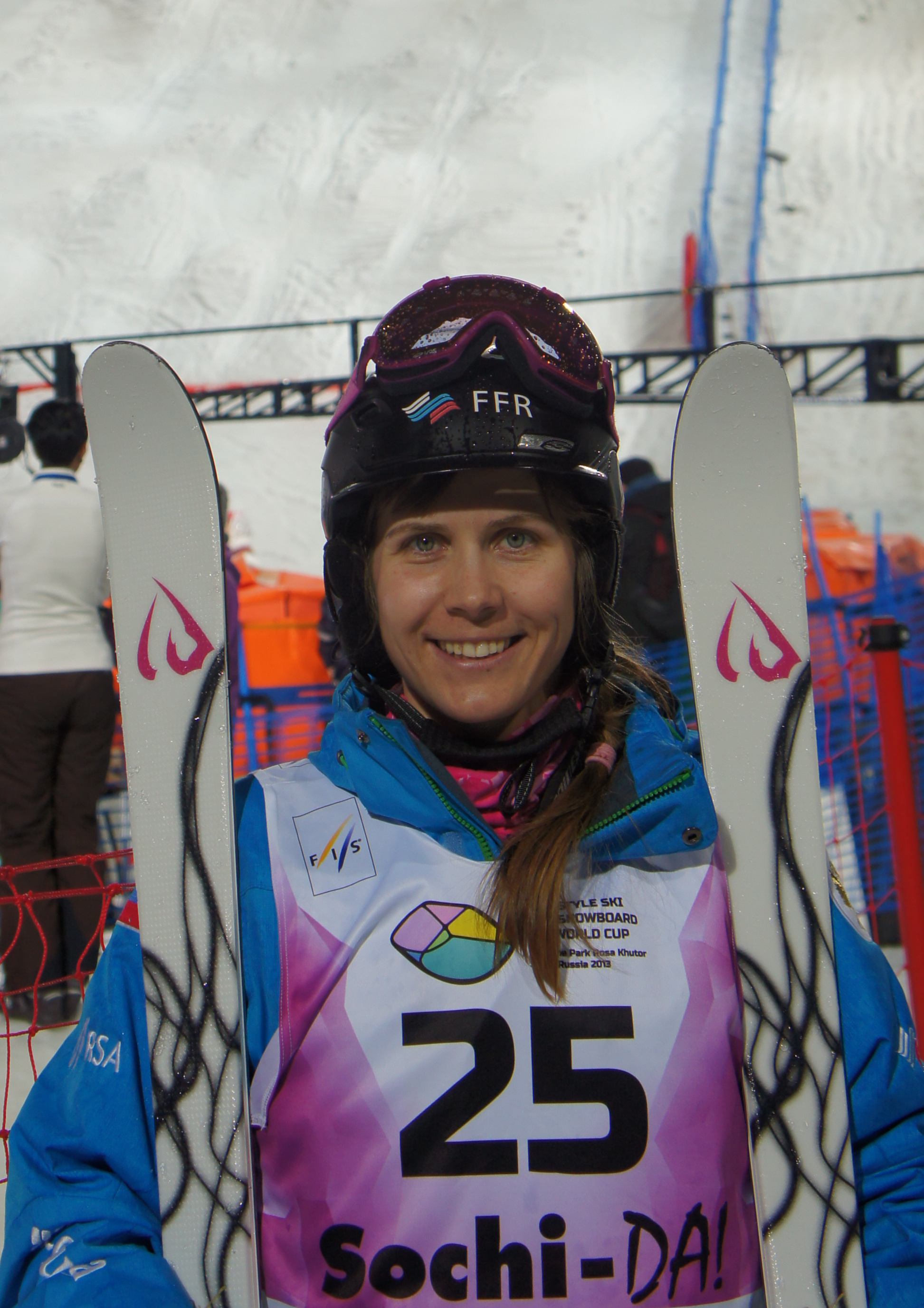
- Elena Muratova in Sochi in 2013

Personal information
- Born: December 12, 1986 (age 39) Kirovsk, USSR
- Height: 164 cm (5 ft 5 in)

Skiing career
- Sport: Alpine skiing
- Disciplines: Moguls, Dual Moguls
- World Cup debut: March 19, 2005 (age 18)

Olympics
- Teams: 1 (2014)
Medal record
World Cups
Silver medal – second place	2014 Inawashiro	Dual Moguls
Junior World Championships
Silver medal – second place	2006 Krasnoe Ozero	Moguls
Bronze medal – third place	2006 Krasnoe Ozero	Dual Moguls
Europe Cups
Gold medal – first place	2006 Dolni Morava	Moguls
Gold medal – first place	2006 Krasnoe Ozero	Moguls
Gold medal – first place	2006 Krasnoe Ozero	Dual Moguls
Gold medal – first place	2010 Hemsedal	Moguls
Gold medal – first place	2010 Hemsedal	Dual Moguls
Gold medal – first place	2010 Megeve	Dual Moguls
Gold medal – first place	2012 Prato Leventina	Dual Moguls
Gold medal – first place	2012 Prato Leventina	Moguls
Gold medal – first place	2012 Piancavallo	Moguls
Gold medal – first place	2012 Piancavallo	Moguls
Silver medal – second place	2005 Spicak v Jizerskych horach	Dual Moguls
Silver medal – second place	2005 Krasnoe Ozero	Moguls
Silver medal – second place	2010 Krasnoe Ozero	Dual Moguls
Silver medal – second place	2010 Sierra Nevada	Dual Moguls
Silver medal – second place	2012 Sudelfeld	Moguls
Silver medal – second place	2012 Sudelfeld	Dual Moguls
Bronze medal – third place	2006 Dolni Morava	Moguls
Bronze medal – third place	2006 Dolni Morava	Moguls
Bronze medal – third place	2010 Krasnoe Ozero	Moguls
Bronze medal – third place	2010 Himos	Dual Moguls
Bronze medal – third place	2010 Himos	Moguls
Bronze medal – third place	2010 Megeve	Moguls
Bronze medal – third place	2011 Polyarnye Zori	Dual Moguls

== Skiing ==
Elena Igorevna Muratova (born December 12, 1986) is a former Russian mogul skier who participated in the 2014 Winter Olympics, won medals at the World Cup, Europe Cup and Russian National Championship.

== Career ==
Muratova has a degree in sports science and works as a personal trainer in Canada. and is the author of My Russian Way to Boldness: How to Find Yourself. ISBN 978-1653891764.
