= Manuela Berchtold =

Australian freestyle skier (born 1977)

Manuela Berchtold (born 27 May 1977) is an Australian freestyle skier, who represented Australia at the 2002 and 2006 Winter Olympics.

== Early life ==
Berchtold was born in 1977 to Ursula Barth and Karl Berchtold in Jindabyne in the Snowy Mountains region of New South Wales. Her mother had represented Switzerland in alpine skiing, while her father was a ski instructor. Her parents had met in Canada before setting in Australia. Berchtold's brother Andrea was also a competitive skier. She grew up in Jindabyne, where she attended Jindabyne Public School before going to high school in Cooma.

== Skiing career ==
A left knee injury in 1997 led to Berchtold not being considered for the 1998 Winter Olympics. Reconstruction of her left knee in 1997 was followed by a reconstruction of her right knee in 1999.

Berchtold was not initially selected for the 2002 Winter Olympics after a knee injury did not allow her to compete in a qualifying event shortly before the games. After an appeal to the Court of Arbitration for Sport (CAS), Berchtold competed in the women's moguls and placed 27th in 2002.

She competed at the FIS Freestyle World Ski Championships in 2001, 2003 and 2005, with her best placement being 17th places in the double moguls at all three World Championships. In the FIS Freestyle Ski World Cup, she placed as high as 8th in January 2004 in Lake Placid, and 9th in January 2006 in Madonna di Campiglio, which was also her last World Cup race.

She was hampered by injuries between Olympics and had a knee reconstruction. In 2006, she came 16th in the qualifying round to make the finals, where she came 14th. She then retired.

== Later life ==
Shortly after retiring from competition, Berchtold opened a gymnasium, High Country Fitness, in Jindabyne, New South Wales.
