= Darya Rybalova =

Kazakhstani freestyle skier

Personal information
- Born: August 19, 1988 (age 37) Oskemen, Kazakh SSR

Sport
- Sport: Skiing
- Updated on July 24, 2013

Darya Rybalova (born August 19, 1988, in Oskemen) is a Kazakhstani freestyle skier, specializing in Moguls.

Rybalova competed at the 2006 and 2010 Winter Olympics for Kazakhstan. Her best finish came in 2010, when she placed 17th in the qualifying round of the moguls, advancing to the final, where she placed 14th. In 2006, she finished 25th in the preliminary round, and did not advance.

As of April 2013, her best showing at the World Championships is 13th, in the 2009 moguls event.

Rybalova made her World Cup debut in December 2005. As of April 2013, her best World Cup event finish is 6th place, at Lake Beida in 2011/12. Her best World Cup overall finish in moguls is 13th, in 2008/09.
