= Eliza Outtrim =

American freestyle skier

Personal information
- Born: Eliza Shirley Outtrim; July 18, 1985 (age 40) New Haven, Connecticut
- Height: 5 ft 4 in (163 cm)
- Weight: 123 lb (56 kg)

Sport
- Country: United States
- Sport: Freestyle skiing
Medal record
Representing United States

Eliza Shirley Outtrim (born July 18, 1985) is an athlete on the U.S. Ski Team; she competes in the freestyle skiing events of moguls and dual moguls.

== Early years ==
Outtrim grew up in Hamden, Connecticut, and when she was young she skied at Mount Snow, Vermont, where she joined the freestyle ski team. Later, she attended the Lowell Whiteman School in Steamboat Springs, Colorado and trained with the Steamboat Springs Winter Sports Club, both of which, the school and the ski team, have produced many Olympic skiers. She attended college while skiing on the US Ski Team, graduating from Colorado College.

== United States Ski Team ==
Outtrim earned a spot on the US Ski Team in 2005, after she tied for second in the Nor-Am Cup moguls rankings. On January 13, 2006, she competed in her first World Cup, which took place in Deer Valley, Utah, and she placed 7th. She started strong, as that was her best World Cup result that season and only top-10 out of those 8 World Cups.

Her highest world ranking was 8th in moguls in 2012, but she was 9th in moguls in 2011 and 2010 as well.

In the World Ski Championships in Inawashiro, Japan, on March 7–8, 2009, she placed 6th in dual moguls and 17th in moguls. But she improved upon that in the 2011 World Ski Championships in Deer Valley, Utah on February 2 and 5, 2011, placing 5th in moguls and 9th in dual moguls.

She has two World Cup podiums, a 1st and a 2nd. The 2nd-place finish was in Moguls in Ruka, Finland on December 10, 2011, where she scored a 22.25 (Hannah Kearney, also of the US Ski Team, won with a score of 24.70). Her World Cup victory came in moguls in Sierra Nevada, Spain on March 18, 2010; in 2nd and 3rd were Austrian Margarita Marbler and American Heather McPhie, and Outtrim was the fastest of the podium finishers and won with a score of 24.38, which was more than half a point higher than Marbler's 23.73 and McPhie's 23.71.

Between 2005 and 2010, she was on the Nor-Am Cup podium 14 times, with 7 victories.

Outtrim also has one national title; she won the US National Championships in dual moguls on March 27, 2011, in Stratton Mountain, Vermont.

Eliza is one of few women on the World Cup who performs the very difficult D-Spin (an off-axis 720) aerial maneuver in moguls.
