= Daria Serova =

Russian freestyle skier

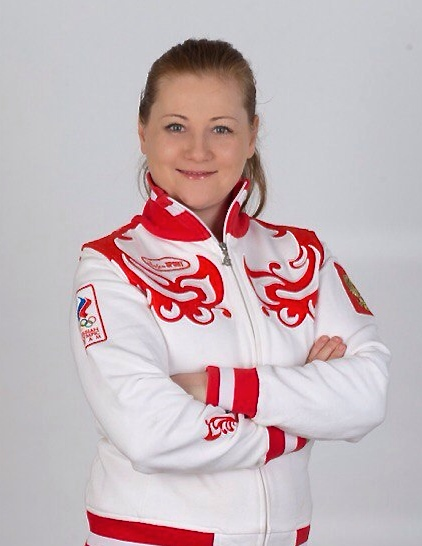

Daria Yevgenyevna Serova (Russian: Дария Евгеньевна Серова, born 24 July 1982 in Kirovsk, Murmansk Oblast) is a Russian freestyle skier who specializes in the moguls discipline. She competed at the 2006 Winter Olympics and the 2010 Winter Olympics.
