= Ellie Koyander =

British freestyle skier

Ellie Koyander (born Elleanor Koyander on 23 March 1991) is a British Olympic mogul skier who competed in the 2010 Winter Olympics.

== Early life ==
She was born in Chesterfield.

She attended the Lady Manners School, a comprehensive school in Bakewell. She trained with the Sharks Ski Club in Sheffield. Her father is a former mogul skier.

== Career ==
Ellie started mogul skiing in 2002.

By the age of 15, she had become the (GBR) Mogul skiing champion and French Junior Champion.

She was coached by Patrick D. Deneen, father of USA moguls competitor Patrick M. Deneen.

=== 2010 Winter Olympics ===
In the 2010 Winter Olympics, she was the youngest member of Team GB, aged 18. She was the youngest female ever to have competed in an Olympic freestyle skiing event. Great Britain only entered three freestyle skiers in three separate events, who were all females.

In the actual competition, she was placed 24th out of 27 but only the first 20 qualified for the final.

== Personal life ==
She used to live in Tideswell in the picturesque Derbyshire Dales. Currently, she lives in Washington state, with her husband and former fellow moguls Olympian, Patrick M. Deneen.

On 29 June 2012 she carried the Olympic flame through Ashbourne.
