= Tereza Vaculíková =

Czech freestyle skier

Personal information
- Born: 30 October 1992 (age 33) Brno, Czech Republic

Sport
- Sport: Skiing
- Updated on 24 July 2013

Tereza Vaculíková (born 30 October 1992 in Brno) is a Czech freestyle skier, specializing in moguls.

Vaculíková competed at the 2010 Winter Olympics and the 2014 Winter Olympics for the Czech Republic in moguls.

In 2011, she won a bronze medal at the Junior World Championship. As of April 2013, her best showing at the World Championships is 11th, in the moguls event in 2011.

Vaculíková made her World Cup debut in February 2009. As of April 2013, her best World Cup event finish is 7th place, in a dual moguls event at Are in 2010/11. Her best World Cup overall finish in moguls is 20th, in 2010/11.
