= Marina Cherkasova (skier) =

Russian freestyle skier

Personal information
- Born: 1 March 1972 (age 54) Moscow, Russian SFSR, Soviet Union
Medal record
Women's freestyle skiing
Representing Russia
World Championships
Silver medal – second place	2003 Deer Valley	Dual Moguls

Marina Yevgenyevna Cherkasova (Russian: Марина Евгеньевна Черкасова; born 1 March 1972) is a Russian freestyle skier who specializes in the moguls discipline and competed at four Winter Olympics.

She was born in Moscow.
