= Ekaterina Stolyarova =

Russian freestyle skier

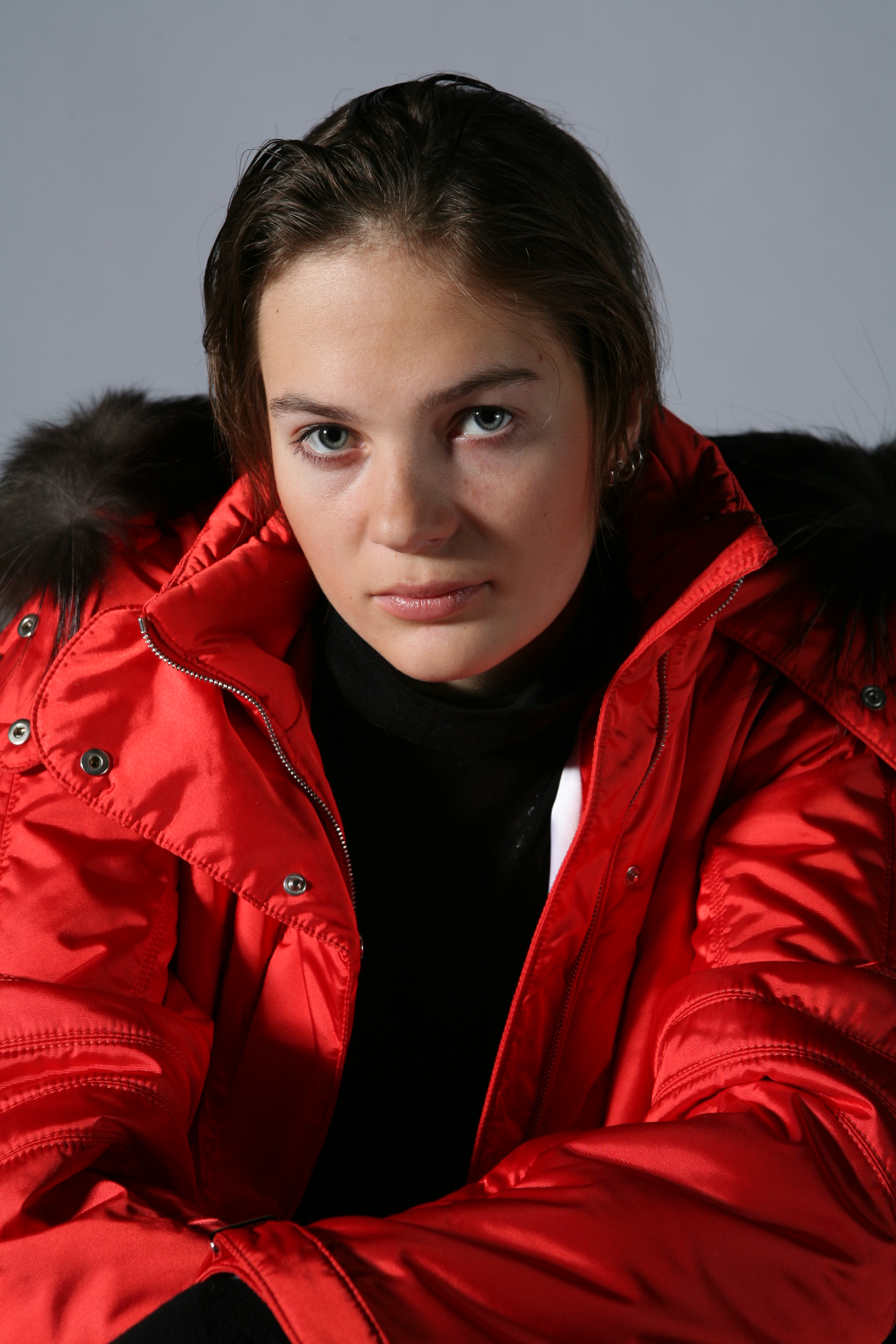
- Ekaterina Stolyarova is a Russian sportswoman, world freestyle champion.

Personal information
- Full name: Ekaterina Andreyevna Stolyarova
- Nationality: Russia
- Born: April 25, 1988 (age 38) Chusovoy, Russian SFSR, Soviet Union (now Russia)

Sport
- Sport: Skiing
- Updated on July 24, 2013

Ekaterina Andreyevna Stolyarova (Russian: Екатерина Андреевна Столярова; born April 25, 1988) is a Russian freestyle skier, specializing in Moguls.

== Career ==
Stolyarova competed at the 2010 Winter Olympics for Russia. She placed 10th in the qualifying round of the moguls, advancing to the final, where she placed 7th.

As of April 2013, her best showing at the World Championships is 4th, in the 2011 moguls event.

Stolyarova made her World Cup debut in December 2005. As of March 2013, she has one World Cup victory, winning at Mont Gabriel in 2007/08. She has also earned three other podium finishes. Her best World Cup overall finish in moguls is 8th, in 2007/08.

== World Cup podiums ==
Date	Location	Rank	Event
20 January 2008	Lake Placid	2nd place, silver medalist(s)	Moguls
26 January 2008	Mont Gabriel	1st place, gold medalist(s)	Moguls
29 January 2011	Calgary	3rd place, bronze medalist(s)	Moguls
14 January 2012	Mont Gabriel	3rd place, bronze medalist(s)	Dual Moguls
