= Junko Hoshino =

Japanese freestyle skier (born 1989)

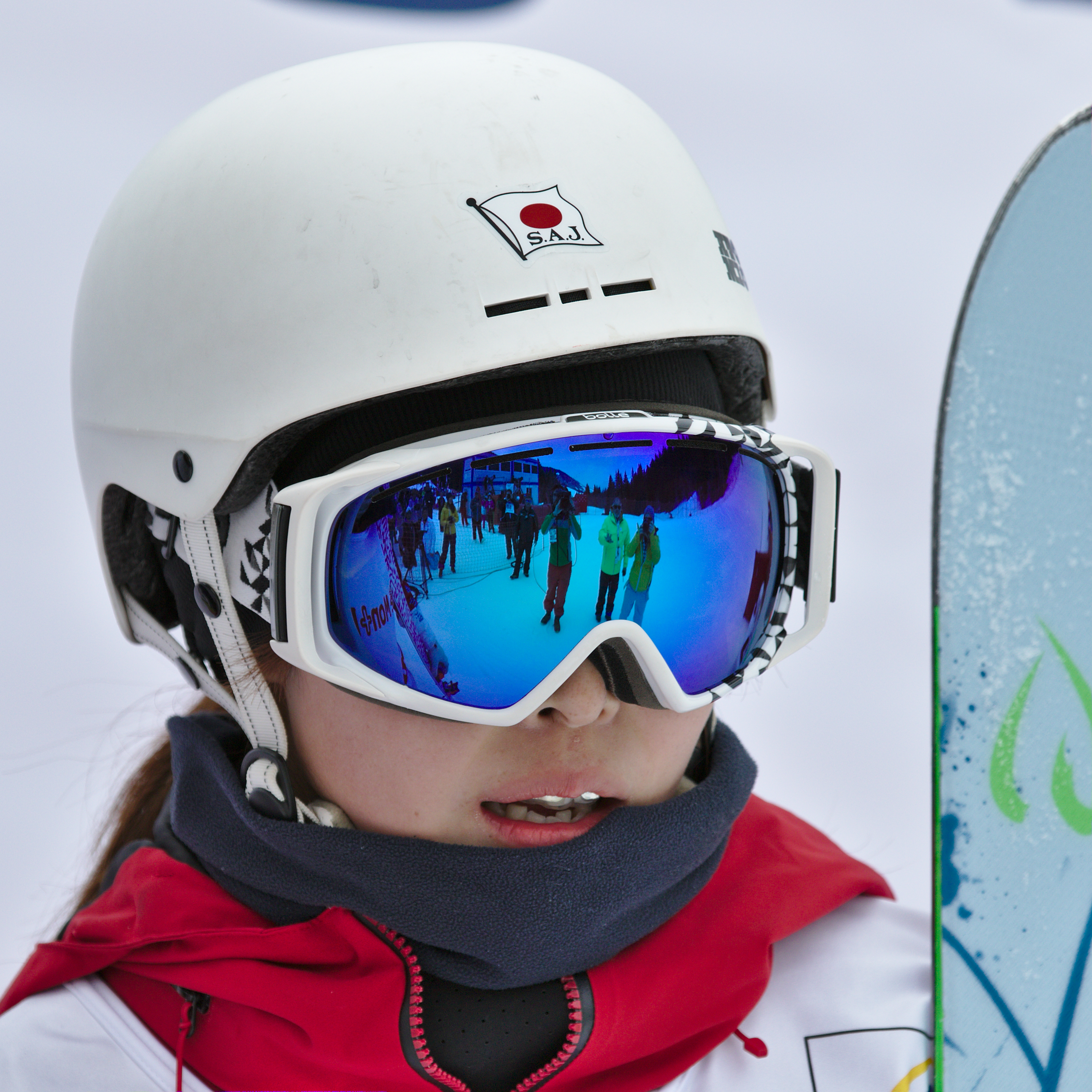

Personal information
- Born: Junko Hoshino; September 25, 1989 (age 36) Nagaoka, Niigata Prefecture, Japan

Sport
- Country: Japan
- Sport: Freestyle skiing
Medal record
Representing Japan

Junko Hoshino (born September 25, 1989) is a Japanese skier who competes in the freestyle skiing event of moguls. She represented Japan in the 2014 Winter Olympics, finishing 15th in women's moguls.
