= Michelle Roark =

American freestyle skier

Personal information
- Born: Artesia, New Mexico, U.S.
- Height: 5 ft 2 in (1.57 m)
- Weight: 111 lb (50 kg)
Medal record
Women's freestyle skiing
Representing United States
World Championships
Silver medal – second place	2003 Deer Valley	Moguls

Michelle Roark is an American freestyle skier who has competed since 1995, mainly in moguls. She is a two-time Olympian, World Cup Champion, World Champion silver medalist FIS Freestyle World Ski Championships 2003 in Deer Valley, Utah and National Champion. She has a half a dozen World Cup victories and a handful of World Cup podium finishes. Roark was named to the US team for the 2006 Winter Olympics and 2010 Winter Olympics.

== Business career ==
Roark is a cum laude graduate of Colorado School of Mines in chemical engineering, scientist of bioenergetics, certified perfumer, author, public speaker and wellness entrepreneur. She is the founder and CEO of a bioenergetics lab based in Denver, Colorado, where she also runs and operates an award winning 'Wellness Salon Spa'.
