= Audrey Robichaud =

Canadian freestyle skier

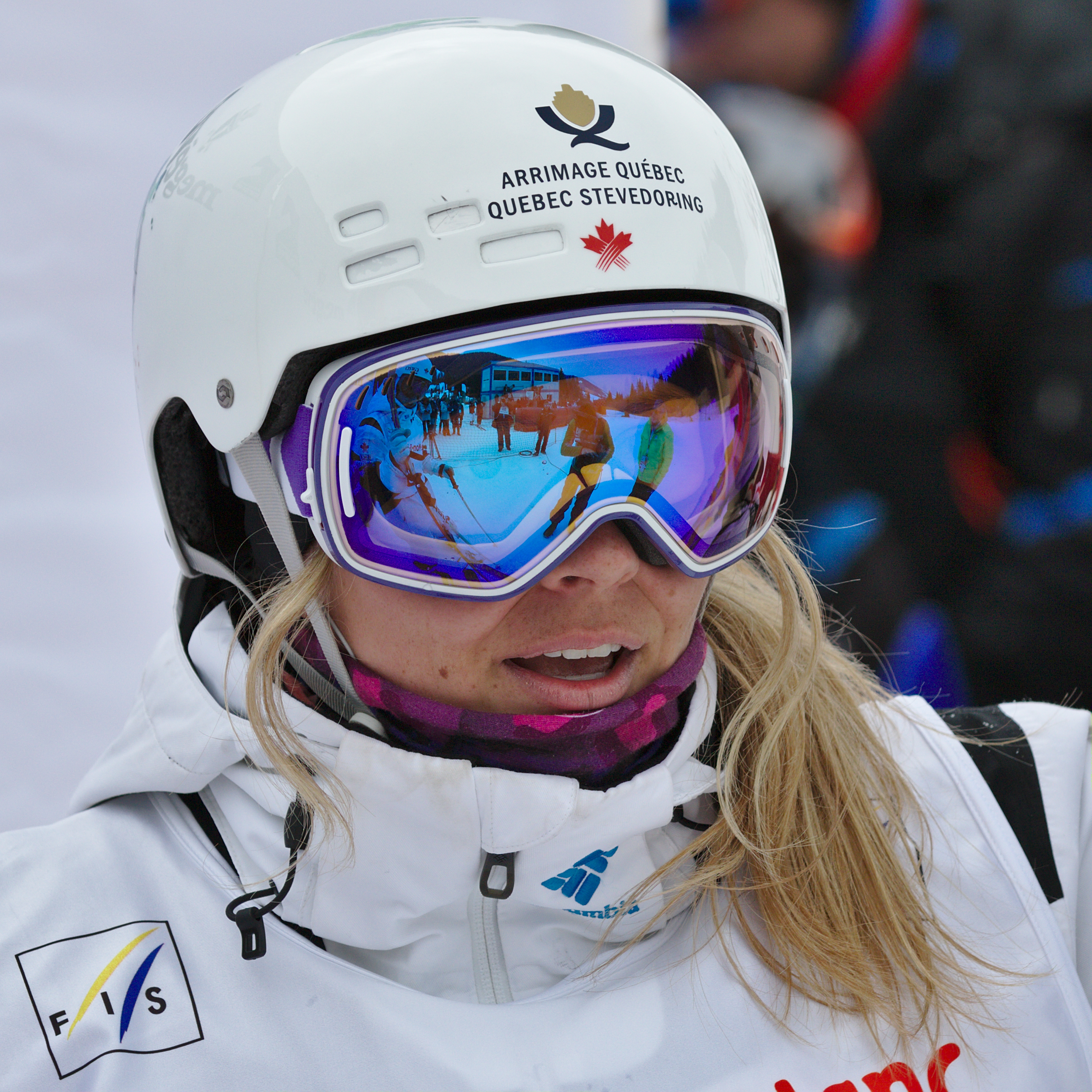

Personal information
- Born: May 5, 1988 (age 38) Quebec City, Quebec, Canada
- Height: 1.55 m (5 ft 1 in)
- Weight: 59 kg (130 lb)
- Website: Audrey Robichaud

Sport
- Country: Canada
- Sport: Freestyle skiing

Audrey Robichaud (born May 5, 1988) is a Canadian skier.

She placed eighth in the women's moguls freestyle skiing at the 2006 Olympics with a score of 23.10. She finished behind fellow Canadians Kristi Richards (7th, 23.30) and Jennifer Heil (1st, 26.50) at this February 11, 2006, event.

In the World Cup Moguls event on December 18, 2005, she finished 14th.

== Early career ==
Audrey began skiing at 4 years old and has been skiing moguls since she was 7 years old at Le Relais, Québec. After a few years of competing at regional and provincial competitions, she was promoted to the Québec team. At the age of 13 years, she was becoming more and more serious about the sport. At 16, after a couple of good results on the Noram circuit, she made the national team. In that same year, she won her first world cup in Mont-Tremblant Québec and competed at 7 world cups, even winning the "rookie of the year" trophy.

== Canadian Ski Team ==
In 2006 at the age of 17 Audrey was accepted by the National Team and qualified for the Olympics in Torino, where she placed 8th. Audrey did not qualify for the 2010 Olympics in Vancouver, but plans on competing in the 2014 Olympic Games in Sochi, RU.

== Results ==
2004 – 2010
