= Kristi Richards =

Canadian freestyle skier

Personal information
- Born: October 27, 1981 (age 44) Penticton, British Columbia, Canada
- Height: 1.63 m (5 ft 4 in)
- Weight: 59 kg (130 lb; 9.3 st)

Sport
- Country: Canada
- Sport: Women's freestyle skiing
Medal record
FIS Freestyle World Ski Championships
Gold medal – first place	2007 Madonna di Campiglio	Moguls
Bronze medal – third place	2011 Deer Valley	Moguls

Kristi Richards (born October 27, 1981, in Penticton, British Columbia) is a Canadian freestyle skier from Summerland, British Columbia. She participates in moguls.

In 2003, Richards won the Canadian championships and in the same year she won the Apex Mountain BC Nor-Am Cup. At the 2006 Winter Olympics, Richards finished in 7th place in the ladies' moguls.

Richards is a two-time recipient of the B.C. Premier's Awards.

At the 2007 Freestyle Skiing world championships in Madonna di Campiglio, Italy, Richards won the gold medal in the mogul competition, beating fellow Canadian and Olympic champion Jennifer Heil.

Richards was a member of the Canadian freestyle team that went to the 2010 Winter Olympics in Vancouver. Kristi Richards competed in the final of the moguls after finishing the qualifying run in 4th place. Richards landed her first jump and on her way to the second jump she lost control, lost a ski, and fell. Richards stood for a while and collected her thoughts, and to the cheers of the Canadians waiting at the bottom once again sped on her way to the second jump. There she landed a back full and completed her run to a screaming throng of Canadian fans at the bottom. However, due to her fall she finished in 20th place and last in the final. Richards recovered from her disappointing Olympics by winning a bronze at the 2011 World Championships in the moguls event.
