= Nikola Sudová =

Czech freestyle skier

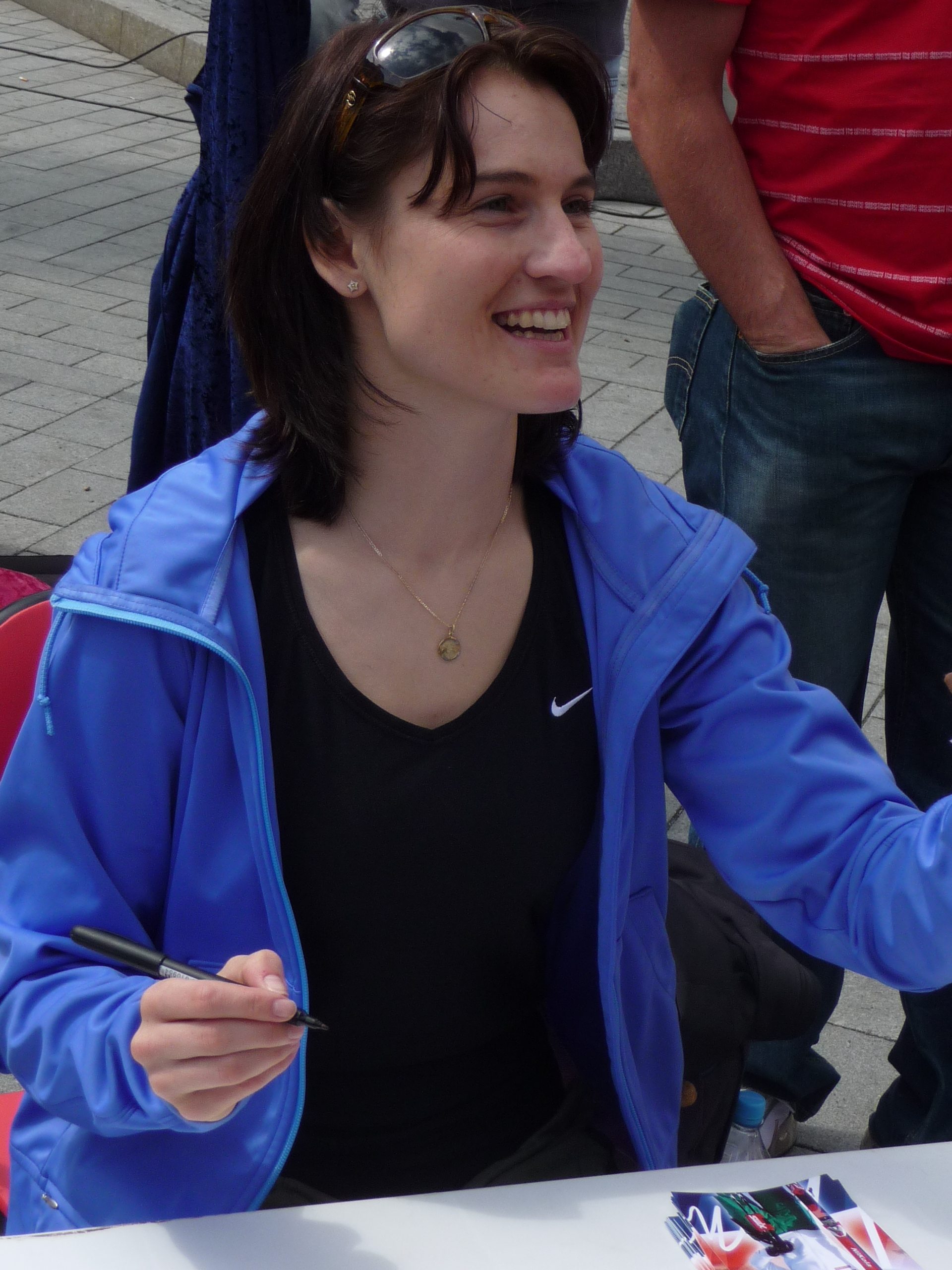
- Nikola Sudová gives autographs

Personal information
- Born: 17 March 1982 (age 44) Jablonec nad Nisou, Czechoslovakia
- Height: 5 ft 4 in (163 cm)
- Weight: 121 lb (55 kg)

Sport
- Country: Czech Republic
- Sport: Freestyle skiing
Medal record
Representing Czech Republic
World Championships
Silver medal – second place	2005 Ruka	Moguls
Bronze medal – third place	2009 Inawashiro	Moguls

Nikola Sudová (born 17 March 1982) is a Czech freestyle skier known for moguls. She has two World Cup victories and competed for the Czech Republic at the 2006 Winter Olympics. She competed in ladies moguls for the Czech Republic at the 2010 Winter Olympics.

She is the older sister of Šárka Sudová.
