= Heather McPhie =

American freestyle skier (born 1984)

Personal information
- Born: May 28, 1984 (age 42) Bozeman, Montana, U.S.
- Height: 5 ft 2 in (157 cm)
- Weight: 123 lb (56 kg)

Skiing career
- Sport: Alpine skiing
- Club: Bridger Freestyle, Team Summit
- Disciplines: Moguls, Dual Moguls
- World Cup debut: January 13, 2006

Olympics
- Teams: 1 (2010)
- Medals: 0 (0 gold)

World Championships
- Teams: 1
- Medals: 0 (0 gold)

World Cup
- Seasons: 5
- Wins: 1
- Podiums: 2
- Discipline titles: 0

Heather McPhie (born May 28, 1984) is an American freestyle moguls skier. She competed for the US Olympic Team at the 2010 Winter Olympics in Vancouver. McPhie earned the Olympic team spot with a 2nd-place finish at the FIS World Cup event at Deer Valley in January 2010. At the 2007 FIS Freestyle World Ski Championships McPhie finished in 8th place in moguls, and 9th in duals.

== Early life ==
McPhie grew up skiing with her family in Bozeman, Montana. Both her parents were ski instructors. She is a great-granddaughter of the founders of Eagle's Store. She was a gymnast until age twelve. She always loved mogul skiing so when she stopped gymnastics, her parents signed her up for the Bridger Freestyle Ski Team. She was originally terrified of jumping which is now her strong suit in the sport.

She graduated from high school in 2002. She received an academic scholarship from the State of Montana, where she attended Montana State University from 2002–2003. In the fall of 2004, McPhie decided to focus all of her attention on mogul skiing. She moved to Breckenridge, Colorado to train in a full-time program.

== Professional career ==
McPhie qualified for the United States Freestyle Ski Team in 2005 by winning the North American Tour. She has been on the national team ever since. In 2010, she went from being unranked in the world in mogul skiing to being ranked second in less than four months. This led her to represent the United States at the 2010 Winter Olympic Games in Vancouver.

In 2012, McPhie became the first mogul skier to pick up a Red Bull sponsorship. That year she added four more World Cup podium finishes on her way to finishing fourth in the mogul standings. She ended the season 2012 with her first United States National Title.

The 2013 season has been a success for McPhie. She had three World Cup wins as well as two other podium finishes. She finished the season ranked third overall in the world. In addition, she won the United States National Title again.

=== Career highlights ===
- 2013 Are- 1st place
- 2013 FIS Freestyle World Championships-4th place
- 2013 Kreischberg- 1st place
- 2013 Ruka- 1st place
- 2013 Deer Valley World Cup- 2nd place
- 2013 World Cup, Moguls Austria- 1st place
- 2012 World Cup, Moguls Finland- 1st place
- 2012 US Championships- 1st place
- 2011 World Cup- 5th place
- 2011 National Championship- 2nd place
- 2010 Overall World Cup- 2nd place
- 2009 North American Tour, Overall Grand Prix Champion
- 2009 Europa Cup- 1st place
- 2006 North American Tour, Overall Grand Prix Champion
- 2005 North American Tour, Overall Grand Prix Champion
