= January 2009 in sports =

| << | January 2009 | | | | | >> |
| Su | Mo | Tu | We | Th | Fr | Sa |
| | | | | 1 | 2 | 3 |
| 4 | 5 | 6 | 7 | 8 | 9 | 10 |
| 11 | 12 | 13 | 14 | 15 | 16 | 17 |
| 18 | 19 | 20 | 21 | 22 | 23 | 24 |
| 25 | 26 | 27 | 28 | 29 | 30 | 31 |
Sports

This list shows notable sports-related deaths, events, and notable outcomes that occurred in January 2009.

== Deaths in January ==
- 2: Ian Greaves
- 2: Joe Henry
- 2: Ryuzo Hiraki
- 3: Sam McQuagg
- 4: Lei Clijsters
- 4: Ivan Gubijan
- 4: Giselle Salandy
- 5: Carl Pohlad
- 5: Dale Livingston
- 5: Pascal Terry
- 6: Charlie Thomson
- 7: Alfie Conn, Sr.
- 8: Zbigniew Podlecki
- 9: Dave Roberts
- 9: Frank Williams
- 10: Rob Gauntlett
- 10: René Herms
- 10: Gil Mains
- 10: Jack Wheeler
- 10: Sidney Wood
- 11: Bob Kilby
- 11: Freddie Mack
- 11: Jon Tvedt
- 12: Russ Craft
- 12: Friaça
- 13: Tommy Casey
- 13: Preston Gómez
- 13: Lanny Kean
- 14: Mike Derrick
- 14: Leo Rwabwogo
- 14: Gennadiy Shatkov
- 15: Tommy Jones
- 16: Joe Erskine
- 16: Claudio Milar
- 17: Mike Parkinson
- 17: Marjorie Parker Smith
- 17: Tomislav Crnković
- 19: José Torres
- 19: Joop Wille
- 20: Johnny Dixon
- 20: Joe Domnanovich
- 20: Dante Lavelli
- 21: Pat Crawford
- 21: Vic Crowe
- 21: Shane Dronett
- 21: Finn Kobberø
- 21: Peter Persidis
- 22: Bill Herchman
- 22: Clément Pinault
- 22: Billy Werber
- 24: Kay Yow
- 24: Fernando Cornejo
- 24: Karl Koller
- 25: Ed Lyons
- 26: Jerry Fowler
- 26: John Isaacs
- 26: Don Ladner
- 27: Billy Wilson
- 27: Aubrey Powell
- 28: Gene Corbett
- 28: Glenn "Jeep" Davis
- 28: Gyula Pálóczi
- 29: Hélio Gracie
- 29: Roy Saunders
- 30: John Gordy
- 30: Safar Iranpak
- 30: Ingemar Johansson
- 31: Eddie Logan

== Current sporting seasons ==
=== American football 2008 ===
- NFL Playoffs

=== Auto racing 2008 ===
- A1 Grand Prix
- GP2 Asia Series
- Speedcar Series
- Rolex Sports Car Series

=== Basketball 2008–09 ===
- NBA
- Euroleague
- EuroCup
- EuroChallenge
- NCAA men
- NCAA women
- Australia
- Greece
- Iran
- Israel
- Italy
- Philippines
  - Philippine Cup
- Spain
  - Spanish 2nd division
- Turkey

=== Football (soccer) ===
- 2008–09
  - England
  - Germany
  - Iran
  - Italy
  - Spain
  - France
  - UEFA (Europe) Champions League
  - UEFA Cup
  - 2010 FIFA World Cup Qualifying

=== Golf 2009 ===
- European Tour
- PGA Tour

=== Ice hockey 2008–09 ===
- National Hockey League
- Champions Hockey League
- Kontinental Hockey League

=== Rugby union 2008–09 ===
- Heineken Cup
- English Premiership
- Celtic League
- Top 14

=== Winter sports ===
- Alpine Skiing World Cup
- Biathlon World Cup
- Bobsleigh World Cup
- Cross-Country Skiing World Cup
- Freestyle Skiing World Cup
- Luge World Cup
- Nordic Combined World Cup
- Short Track Speed Skating World Cup
- Skeleton World Cup
- Ski Jumping World Cup
- Snowboard World Cup
- Speed Skating World Cup

== Days of the month ==
=== January 31, 2009 (Saturday) ===
==== American football ====
- NCAA Bowl Games:
  - 2009 Texas vs. The Nation Game in El Paso, Texas:
    - The Nation 27, Texas 24
      - In college football's season finale, Florida Atlantic's Frantz Joseph, with a 26-yard interception and a 32-yard fumble return, led The Nation team to a 27–24 victory over the Texas squad. Joseph was also named the game's defensive Most Valuable Player.

==== Cricket ====
- India in Sri Lanka:
  - 2nd ODI at Colombo:
    - India 256/9 (50 ov); Sri Lanka 241 (49.2 ov). India win by 15 runs and lead 5-match series 2–0.
- Zimbabwe in Kenya:
  - 3rd ODI in Nairobi:
    - Kenya 234 (49.3 ov); Zimbabwe 236/6 (48.2 ov). Zimbabwe win by 4 wickets and win 5-match series 3–0.

==== Mixed martial arts ====
- UFC 94 in Las Vegas

==== Tennis ====
- Australian Open in Melbourne, day 13:
  (seeding in parentheses)
  - Women's singles final:
    - Serena Williams (United States) (2) beat Dinara Safina (Russia) (3) 6–0, 6–3
      - Serena Williams wins her fourth Australian Open and tenth Grand Slam title, and will claim the Women's World #1 ranking.
  - Men's doubles final:
    - Bob Bryan (United States) /Mike Bryan (United States) (2) beat Mahesh Bhupathi (India) /Mark Knowles (The Bahamas) (3) 2–6, 7–5, 6–0
      - The Bryans win their third Australian Open and seventh Grand Slam men's doubles title.

==== Winter sports ====
===== Alpine skiing =====
- Men's World Cup in Garmisch-Partenkirchen, Germany:
  - Downhill: cancelled
- Women's World Cup in Garmisch-Partenkirchen, Germany:
  - Super giant slalom: postponed to February 1.

===== Cross-country skiing =====
- World Cup in Rybinsk, Russia:
  - Women sprint freestyle: (1) Pirjo Muranen (Finland) (2) Arianna Follis (Italy) (3) Magda Genuin (Italy)
    - Overall World Cup standings (after 21 of 33 races): (1) Aino-Kaisa Saarinen (Finland) 1220 points (2) Petra Majdič (Slovenia) 1090 Virpi Kuitunen (Finland) 1069
  - Men sprint freestyle: (1) Renato Pasini (Italy) (2) Alexei Petukhov (Russia) (3) Anton Gafarov (Russia)
    - Overall World Cup standings (after 21 of 33 races): (1) Dario Cologna (Switzerland) 906 points (2) Petter Northug (Norway) 698 (3) Axel Teichmann (Germany) 649

===== Freestyle skiing =====
- World Cup in Deer Valley, Park City, Utah, United States:
  - Half-pipe men:
  - Half-pipe women:
  - Dual moguls men:
  - Dual moguls women:

===== Nordic combined =====
- World Cup in Chaux-Neuve, France:
  - 10 km Gundersen: (1) Magnus Moan (Norway) 26min 06sec 8/10 (25th) (2) Anssi Koivuranta (Finland) at 9.2 (1st) (3) Bjorn Kircheisen (Germany) 32.9 (8th)
    - Overall World Cup standings (after 14 of 22 events): (1) Koivuranta 853 points (2) Moan 801 (3) Kircheisen 709

===== Ski jumping =====
- World Cup in Sapporo, Japan:
  - 134m hill: (1) Gregor Schlierenzauer (Austria) 253.3 points (133.0/120.5m) (2) Thomas Morgenstern (Austria) 216.9 (112.0/123.5) (3) Wolfgang Loitzl (Austria) 211.2 (112.0/119.5)
    - Schlierenzauer wins fourth World Cup in a row.
    - Overall World Cup standings (after 18 events): (1) Schlierenzauer 1420 points, (2) Simon Ammann (Switzerland) 1248, (3) Loitzl 1166

===== Snowboarding =====
- World Cup in Bayrischzell/Sudelfeld, Germany:
  - Parallel GS men: (1) Andreas Prommegger (Austria) (2) Matthew Morrison (Canada) (3) Sylvain Dufour (France)
  - Parallel GS women: (1) Doris Guenther (Austria) (2) Amelie Kober (Germany) (3) Nicolien Sauerbreij (Netherlands)

===== Speed skating =====
- World Cup 7 in Erfurt, Germany:
  - Men's 500 m:
  - Men's 1500 m
  - Women's 500 m:
  - Women's 3000 m:

=== January 30, 2009 (Friday) ===
==== Cricket ====
- South Africa in Australia:
  - 5th ODI in Perth:
    - South Africa 288/6 (50 ov); Australia 249 (49 ov). South Africa win by 39 runs and win the series 4–1.

==== Football (soccer) ====
- UNCAF Nations Cup in Tegucigalpa, Honduras:
  - Semifinals:
    - Costa Rica 1–0 El Salvador
    - Honduras 0–1 Panama

==== Handball ====
- World Men's Championship in Croatia
  - Semifinals:
    - Denmark 22–27 **France**
    - **Croatia** 29–23 Poland

==== Tennis ====
- Australian Open in Melbourne, day 12:
  (seeding in parentheses)
  - Men's singles semifinals:
    - Rafael Nadal (Spain) (1) beat Fernando Verdasco (Spain) (14) 6–7 (4), 6–4, 7–6 (2), 6–7 (1), 6–4
  - Women's doubles final:
    - Serena Williams (United States) /Venus Williams (United States) (10) beat Daniela Hantuchová (Slovakia) /Ai Sugiyama (Japan) (9) 6–3, 6–3
      - The Williams sisters win their third Australian Open and eighth Grand Slam title.

==== Winter sports ====
===== Alpine skiing =====
- Women's World Cup in Garmisch-Partenkirchen, Germany:
  - Slalom: (1) Lindsey Vonn (United States) 1:47.17 (52.49 + 54.68) (2) Maria Riesch (Germany) at 0.90 (53.05 + 55.02) (3) Marusa Ferk (Slovenia) 1.16 (53.61 + 54.72)
    - World Cup overall standings (after 21 of 34 races): (1) Vonn 1014 pts (2) Riesch 890 (3) Kathrin Zettel (Austria) & Anja Paerson (Sweden) 775

===== Cross-country skiing =====
- World Cup in Rybinsk, Russia:
  - Women 10 km freestyle: (1) Marianna Longa (Italy) 25min 22.6sec (2) Arianna Follis (Italy) at 0.4sec (3) Stephanie Böhler (Germany) 1.6
    - Overall World Cup standings (after 20 of 33 races): (1) Aino-Kaisa Saarinen (Finland) 1170 points (2) Petra Majdič (Slovenia) 1054 (3) Virpi Kuitunen (Finland) 1045
  - Men 15 km freestyle: (1) Tobias Angerer (Germany) 36:05.9 (2) Jean Marc Gaillard (France) 0.7 (3) Sergei Dolidovich (Belarus) 1.0
    - Overall World Cup standings (after 20 of 33 races): (1) Dario Cologna (Switzerland) 906 points (2) Petter Northug (Norway) 698 (3) Axel Teichmann (Germany) 649

===== Freestyle skiing =====
- World Cup in Deer Valley, Park City, Utah, United States:
  - Aerials men: (1) Ryan St. Onge (United States) 254.89 points (2) Zhongquin Liu (China) 249.79 (3) Steve Omischl (Canada) 247.92
  - Aerials women: (1) Li Nina (China) 194.67 points (2) Guo Xinxin (China) 191.54 (3) Emily Cook (United States) 178.21

===== Speed skating =====
- World Cup 7 in Erfurt, Germany:
  - Men's 500 m: (1) Yu Fengtong (China) 35.03 (2) Keiichiro Nagashima (Japan) 35.04 (3) Tucker Fredricks (United States) 35.12
  - Men's 5000 m: (1) Sven Kramer (Netherlands) 6:16.02 (2) Håvard Bøkko (Norway) 6:22.37 (3) Bob de Jong (Netherlands) 6:23.45
  - Women's 500 m: (1) Jenny Wolf (Germany) 37.58 (2) Yu Jing (China) 38.18 (3) Jin Peiyu (China) 38.30
  - Women's 1500 m: (1) Anni Friesinger (Germany) 1:56.90 (2) Daniela Anschütz-Thoms (Germany) 1:58.13 (3) Ireen Wüst (Netherlands) 1:58.54

=== January 29, 2009 (Thursday) ===
==== Basketball ====
- Euroleague Top 16, week 1:
  - Group E:
    - AJ Milano (Italy) 76–74 (Greece) Olympiacos
  - Group F:
    - Maccabi Tel Aviv (Israel) 96–65 (Germany) ALBA Berlin
  - Group G:
    - Panathinaikos (Greece) 81–63 (Serbia) Partizan Igokea
    - Lottomatica Roma (Italy) 75–88 (Spain) Unicaja Málaga
  - Group H:
    - Fenerbahçe Ülker (Turkey) 48–66 (Russia) CSKA Moscow

==== Cricket ====
- Zimbabwe in Kenya:
  - 2nd ODI in Mombasa:
    - Zimbabwe 351/7 (50 ov); Kenya 200 (45.1 ov). Zimbabwe win by 151 runs and lead 5-match series 2–0.

==== Football (soccer) ====
- UNCAF Nations Cup in Tegucigalpa, Honduras:
  - Fifth place:
    - Nicaragua 2–0 Guatemala
      - Nicaragua qualify to CONCACAF Gold Cup.

==== Handball ====
- World Men's Championship in Croatia
  - 5th/6th Placement Match:
    - Hungary 25–28 Germany
  - 7th/8th Placement Match:
    - Sweden 37–29 Serbia
  - 9th/10th Placement Match:
    - Slovakia 27–34 Norway
  - 11th/12th Placement Match:
    - South Korea 31–32 Macedonia

==== Tennis ====
- Australian Open in Melbourne, day 11:
  (seeding in parentheses)
  - Men's singles semifinals:
    - Roger Federer (Switzerland) (2) bt Andy Roddick (United States) (7) 6–2, 7–5, 7–5
  - Women's singles semifinals:
    - Serena Williams (United States) (2) bt Elena Dementieva (Russia) (4) 6–3, 6–4
    - Dinara Safina (Russia) (3) bt Vera Zvonareva (Russia) (7) 6–3, 7–6 (4)

==== Winter sports ====
===== Freestyle skiing =====
- World Cup in Deer Valley, Park City, Utah, United States:
  - Moguls men: (1) Guilbaut Colas (France) 24.62 (2) Alexandre Bilodeau (Canada) 24.20 (3) Patrick Deneen (United States) 23.99
  - Moguls women: (1) Hannah Kearney (United States) 22.91 (2) Michelle Roark (United States) 21.75 (3) Margarita Marbler (Austria) 20.80

=== January 28, 2009 (Wednesday) ===
==== Basketball ====
- Euroleague Top 16, week 1:
  - Group E:
    - TAU Cerámica (Spain) 99–77 (Poland) Asseco Prokom Sopot
  - Group F:
    - Real Madrid (Spain) 85–83 (Spain) Regal FC Barcelona
  - Group H:
    - Cibona Zagreb (Croatia) 88–81 (Italy) Montepaschi Siena

==== Cricket ====
- India in Sri Lanka:
  - 1st ODI at Dambulla:
    - Sri Lanka 246/7 (50 ov); India 247/4 (48.1 ov). India win by 6 wickets and lead 5-match series 1–0.

==== Ice hockey ====
- Champions Hockey League Finals, second leg:
  - **ZSC Lions** (Switzerland) 5–0 (Russia) Metallurg Magnitogorsk
    - Lions win 7–2 on aggregate

==== Tennis ====
- Australian Open in Melbourne, day 10:
  (seeding in parentheses)
  - Men's singles quarterfinals:
    - Rafael Nadal (Spain) (1) bt Gilles Simon (France) (6) 6–2, 7–5, 7–5
    - Fernando Verdasco (Spain) (14) bt Jo-Wilfried Tsonga (France) (5) 7–6 (2), 3–6, 6–3, 6–2
  - Women's singles quarterfinals:
    - Serena Williams (United States) (2) bt Svetlana Kuznetsova (Russia) (8) 5–7, 7–5, 6–1
    - Elena Dementieva (Russia) (4) bt Carla Suárez Navarro (Spain) 6–2, 6–2

=== January 27, 2009 (Tuesday) ===
==== Cricket ====
- Zimbabwe in Kenya:
  - 1st ODI in Mombasa:
    - Zimbabwe 306/7 (50 ov); Kenya 197 (46.2 ov). Zimbabwe win by 109 runs and lead 5-match series 1–0.

==== Football (soccer) ====
- UNCAF Nations Cup in Tegucigalpa, Honduras:
  - Group 2:
    - Panama 1–0 Guatemala
      - Panama advance to the semifinals and qualify to CONCACAF Gold Cup. Guatemala will play for 5th place.

==== Handball ====
- World Men's Championship in Croatia:
  (teams in **bold** advance to the semifinals)
  - Group I:
    - Hungary 28–27 South Korea
    - Slovakia 26–27 Sweden
    - **France** 19–22 **Croatia**
  - Group II:
    - Macedonia 28–32 Serbia
    - Germany 25–27 **Denmark**
    - **Poland** 31–30 Norway
  - 13th/14th Placement Match:
    - Spain 28–24 Egypt
  - 15th/16th Placement Match:
    - Romania 42–38 Russia
  - 17th/18th Placement Match:
    - Argentina 23–29 Tunisia
  - 19th/20th Placement Match:
    - Cuba 27–34 Algeria
  - 21st/22nd Placement Match:
    - Kuwait 24–27 Brazil
  - 23rd/24th Placement Match:
    - Australia 19–23 Saudi Arabia

==== Tennis ====
- Australian Open in Melbourne, day 9:
  (seeding in parentheses)
  - Men's singles quarterfinals:
    - Roger Federer (Switzerland) (2) bt Juan Martín del Potro (Argentina) (8) 6–3, 6–0, 6–0
    - Andy Roddick (United States) (7) bt Novak Djokovic (Serbia) (3) 6–7 (3), 6–4, 6–2, 2–1, retired
  - Women's singles quarterfinals:
    - Dinara Safina (Russia) (3) bt Jelena Dokić (Australia) 6–4, 4–6, 6–4
    - Vera Zvonareva (Russia) (7) bt Marion Bartoli (France) (16) 6–3, 6–0

==== Winter sports ====
===== Alpine skiing =====
- Men's World Cup in Schladming, Austria:
  - Slalom: (1) Reinfried Herbst (Austria) 1:37.32 ( 47.73 + 49.59) (2) Manfred Pranger (Austria) 1:38.48 ( 48.31 + 50.17) (3) Ivica Kostelic (Croatia) 1:38.55 ( 48.83 + 49.72)
    - World Cup overall standings (after 25 of 37 races): (1) Kostelic 735 pts (2) Benjamin Raich (Austria) 660 Jean-Baptiste Grange (France) 656

=== January 26, 2009 (Monday) ===
==== Cricket ====
- South Africa in Australia:
  - 4th ODI in Adelaide:
    - Australia 222 (48 ov); South Africa 223/2 (38.1 ov). South Africa wins by 8 wickets, and wins series, 3–1 with one match remaining.

==== Football (soccer) ====
- UNCAF Nations Cup in Tegucigalpa, Honduras:
  - Group 1:
    - Nicaragua 1–1 Belize
    - Honduras 2–0 El Salvador
      - Honduras and El Salvador advance to the semifinals and qualify to CONCACAF Gold Cup. Nicaragua will play in 5th place playoff.

==== Handball ====
- World Men's Championship in Croatia:
  - President's Cup–Group I:
    - Australia 24–27 Kuwait
    - Argentina 30–23 Cuba
    - Romania 32–40 Spain
  - President's Cup–Group II:
    - Algeria 30–27 Saudi Arabia
    - Tunisia 34–33 Brazil
    - Russia 27–31 Egypt

==== Tennis ====
- Australian Open in Melbourne, day 8:
  (seeding in parentheses)
  - Men's singles 4th round:
    - Rafael Nadal (Spain) (1) bt Fernando González (Chile) (13) 6–3, 6–2, 6–4
    - Fernando Verdasco (Spain) (14) bt Andy Murray (United Kingdom) (4) 2–6, 6–1, 1–6, 6–3, 6–4
    - Jo-Wilfried Tsonga (France) (5) bt James Blake (United States) (9) 6–4, 6–4, 7^{7}-6^{3}
    - Gilles Simon (France) (6) bt Gaël Monfils (France) (12) 6–4, 2–6, 6–1, retired
  - Women's singles 4th round:
    - Serena Williams (United States) (2) bt Victoria Azarenka (Belarus) (13), 3–6, 4–2, retired
    - Elena Dementieva (Russia) (4) bt Dominika Cibulková (Slovakia) (18), 6–2, 6–2
    - Svetlana Kuznetsova (Russia) (8) bt Zheng Jie (China) (22) 4–1, retired
    - Carla Suárez Navarro (Spain) bt Anabel Medina Garrigues (Spain) (21) 6–3, 6–2

==== Winter sports ====
===== Alpine skiing =====
- Women's World Cup in Cortina d'Ampezzo, Italy:
  - Super giant slalom: (1) Jessica Lindell-Vikarby (Sweden) 1:25.13 (2) Andrea Fenninger (Austria) 1:25.94 (2) Andrea Dettling (Switzerland) 1:26.00
    - World Cup overall standings (after 20 of 34 races): (1) Lindsey Vonn (United States) 914 pts (2) Maria Riesch (Germany) 810 (3) Anja Paerson (Sweden) & Kathrin Zettel (Austria) 775

=== January 25, 2009 (Sunday) ===
==== Auto racing ====
- Sports cars endurance racing:
  - 24 Hours of Daytona in Daytona Beach, Florida, United States:
    - (1) David Donohue (United States) Antonio García (Spain) Darren Law (United States) Buddy Rice (United States)
    - (2) Juan Pablo Montoya (Colombia) Scott Pruett (United States) Memo Rojas (Mexico)
    - (3) João Barbosa (Portugal) Terry Borcheller (United States) J. C. France (United States) Hurley Haywood (United States)
      - In the closest contested finish in the history of major international 24-hour endurance racing, the No. 58 Brumos Racing-run Riley–Porsche held off the No. 01 Chip Ganassi Racing with Felix Sabates-run Riley-Lexus by just 0.167 seconds after 2,616.6 miles (4,211.0 km).

==== Cycling ====
- UCI ProTour:
  - Tour Down Under:
    - Stage 6, Adelaide City Council Circuit, 90 km: (1) Francesco Chicchi (Italy) Liquigas 1hr 42min 00, (2) Robbie McEwen (Australia) same time, (3) Graeme Brown (Australia) s.t.
      - Final standing: (1) Allan Davis (Australia) 19hr 26min 59sec, (2) Stuart O'Grady (Australia) at 25secs, (3) Jose Rojas (Spain) 30 ...29. Lance Armstrong (United States) 49

==== Football (soccer) ====
- UNCAF Nations Cup in Tegucigalpa, Honduras:
  - Group 2:
    - Guatemala 1–3 Costa Rica
      - Costa Rica advance to the semifinals.

==== Golf ====
- PGA Tour:
  - Bob Hope Classic in Palm Desert, California:
    - Winner: Pat Perez (United States) 327 (−33)
- European Tour:
  - Qatar Masters in Doha, Qatar:
    - Winner: Álvaro Quirós (Spain) 269 (−19)
- LPGA Tour:
  - HSBC LPGA Brasil Cup in Brazil:
    - Winner: Catriona Matthew (Scotland) 138 (−6)

==== Handball ====
- World Men's Championship in Croatia:
  (teams in **bold** advance to the semifinals)
  - Group I:
    - **Croatia** 31–25 Slovakia
    - South Korea 21–30 **France**
    - Sweden 30–31 Hungary
  - Group II:
    - Denmark 32–24 Macedonia
    - Norway 25–24 Germany
    - Serbia 23–35 Poland
  - President's Cup–Group I:
    - Spain 31–19 Argentina
    - Kuwait 27–34 Romania
    - Cuba 27–17 Australia
  - President's Cup–Group II:
    - Egypt 31–30 Tunisia
    - Saudi Arabia 15–34 Russia
    - Brazil 28–29 Algeria

==== Ice hockey ====
- NHL All-Star Game in Montreal, Canada:
  - East 12, West 11 (OT)

==== Rugby union ====
- Heineken Cup Pool stage, week 6:
  (teams in **bold** advance to the quarterfinals)
  - Pool 1:
    - Montauban (France) 13–39 (Ireland) **Munster**
      - Munster, assured of a quarterfinal berth last weekend, secure a home quarterfinal.
  - Pool 2:
    - **Leinster** (Ireland) 12–3 (Scotland) Edinburgh
      - Leinster's win and Wasps' loss send the Irish through as pool winners.
    - Castres (France) 21–15 (England) London Wasps
      - A Castres try four minutes from time eliminates Wasps from European competition, which also assure (Wales) **Ospreys** a quarterfinal spot.
  - Pool 5:
    - **Bath** (England) 3–3 (France) **Toulouse**
      - A dour draw played in a downpour at The Rec sees both teams go through to the quarterfinals.
    - Glasgow Warriors (Scotland) 13–10 (Wales) Newport Gwent Dragons
  - Quarterfinal matchups (to be played weekend of 10–12 April):
    - (1) Cardiff Blues (Wales) – (France) Toulouse (8)
    - (2) Munster (Ireland) – (Wales) Ospreys (7)
    - (3) Harlequins (England) – (Ireland) Leinster (6)
    - (4) Leicester Tigers (England) – (England) Bath (5)

==== Tennis ====
- Australian Open in Melbourne, day 7:
  (seeding in parentheses)
  - Men's singles 4th round:
    - Roger Federer (Switzerland) (2) bt Tomáš Berdych (Czech Republic) (20) 4–6, 6–7 (4), 6–4, 6–4 6–2
    - Novak Djokovic (Serbia) (3) bt Marcos Baghdatis (Cyprus) 6–1, 7–6 (1), 6–7 (5), 6–2
    - Andy Roddick (United States) (7) bt Tommy Robredo (Spain) (21) 7–5, 6–1, 6–3
    - Juan Martín del Potro (Argentina) (8) bt Marin Čilić (Croatia) (19) 5–7, 6–4, 6–4, 6–2
  - Women's singles 4th round:
    - Marion Bartoli (France) (16) bt Jelena Janković (Serbia) (1) 6–1 6–4
    - Dinara Safina (Russia) (3) bt Alizé Cornet (France) (15) 6–2, 2–6, 7–5
    - Vera Zvonareva (Russia) (7) bt Nadia Petrova (Russia) (10) 7–5, 6–4
    - Jelena Dokić (Australia) bt Alisa Kleybanova (Russia) (29) 7–5, 5–7, 8–6

==== Winter sports ====
===== Alpine skiing =====
- Men's World Cup in Kitzbühel, Austria:
  - Slalom: (1) Julien Lizeroux (France) 1min 33.83sec (46.88 + 46.95) (2) Jean-Baptiste Grange (France) 1:33.91 (45.88 + 48.03) (3) Patrick Thaler (Italy) 1:34.50 (47.20 + 47.30)
  - Combined: (1) Silvan Zurbriggen (Switzerland) 3min 33.38sec (2) Ivica Kostelic (Croatia) 3:33.87 (3) Natko Zrnčić-Dim (Croatia) 3:36.36
    - World Cup overall standings (after 24 of 38 races): (1) Kostelic 675 pts (2) Benjamin Raich (Austria) 660 (3) Grange 656
- Women's World Cup in Cortina d'Ampezzo, Italy:
  - Giant slalom: (1) Kathrin Zettel (Austria) 2:47.10 (1:19.47 + 1:27.63) (2) Michaela Kirchgasser (Austria) 2:48.49 (1:20.18 + 1:28.31) (3) Elisabeth Görgl (Austria) 2:48.81 (1:19.09 + 1:29.72)
    - World Cup overall standings (after 19 races): (1) Lindsey Vonn (United States) 882 pts (2) Maria Riesch (Germany) 810 (3) Anja Pärson (Sweden) 775

===== Bandy =====
- World Championship in Västerås, Sweden:
  - Final: Sweden 6–1 Russia
  - Match for 3rd place: Kazakhstan 5–7 Finland
  - Qualification for Group A: Belarus 3–1 United States

===== Biathlon =====
- World Cup 6 in Antholz, Italy:
  - Women's 12.5 km Mass Start: (1) Ekaterina Iourieva (Russia) 36min 37.8sec (0) (2) Helena Jonsson (Sweden) at 13.4sec (1) (3) Kaisa Maekaerainen (FIN) 27.8 (2) ... 7. Magdalena Neuner (Germany) 46.0 (5)
    - Neuner had a comfortable lead going to the last shoot, but she missed all 5 targets and finished in seventh place.
    - Overall World Cup standings (after 14 of 26 races): (1) Iourieva 567 points (2) Kati Wilhelm (Germany) 520 (3) Neuner 502
  - Men's 15 km Mass Start: (1) Christoph Stephan (Germany) 37:19.9 (1 penalty) (2) Dominik Landertinger (Austria) at 0.2 (3) (3) Ivan Tcherezov (Russia) 2.8 (2)
    - Overall World Cup standings (after 14 of 26 races): (1) Emil Hegle Svendsen (Norway) 568 points (2) Tomasz Sikora (Poland) 554 (3) Carl-Johan Bergman (Sweden) 456

===== Cross-country skiing =====
- World Cup in Otepää, Estonia:
  - Men's classic sprint: (1) Ola Vigen Hattestad (Norway) (2) Øystein Pettersen (Norway) (3) Boerre Naess (Norway)
    - Overall World Cup standings (after 19 of 33 races): (1) Dario Cologna (Switzerland) 880 points (2) Petter Northug (Norway) 698 (3) Axel Teichmann (Germany) 631
  - Women's classic sprint: (1) Petra Majdič (Slovenia) (2) Aino-Kaisa Saarinen (Finland) (3) Virpi Kuitunen (Finland)
    - Overall World Cup standings (after 19 of 33 races): (1) Saarinen 1138 points (2) Majdic 1043 (3) Kuitunen 1027

===== Figure skating =====
- United States Championships in Cleveland, Ohio:
  - Men: (1) Jeremy Abbott 241.89pts (2) Brandon Mroz 229.70 (3) Evan Lysacek 229.10

===== Freestyle skiing =====
- World Cup in Mont Gabriel, Canada:
  - Aerials men: (1) Steve Omischl (Canada) 242.45 pts (2) Timofei Slivets (Belarus) 240.95 (3) Thomas Lambert (Switzerland) 233.95
  - Aerials women: (1) Lydia Lassila (Australia) 185.94 pts (2) Cheng Shuang (China) 181.18 (3) Zhao Shanshan (China) 170.41

===== Luge =====
- World Cup 7 in Altenberg, Germany:
  - Men: (1) Armin Zöggeler (Italy) (2) Felix Loch (Germany) (3) David Möller (Germany)
    - World Cup standings (after 7 of 9 races): (1) Zöggeler 601 points (2) Möller 525 (3) Jan Eichhorn (Germany) 430

===== Ski jumping =====
- World Cup in Vancouver, British Columbia, Canada:
  - 140m hill: (1) Gregor Schlierenzauer (Austria) 293.2pts (137.5/149.0 m), (2) Thomas Morgenstern (Austria) 291.7 (140.5/141.0), (3) Ville Larinto (Finland) 272.3 (137.0/149.0)
    - Schlierenzauer scores third win in a row and fifth in six events.
    - World Cup standings (17 of 28 rounds): (1) Schlierenzauer 1320pts, (2) Simon Ammann (Switzerland) 1212, (3) Wolfgang Loitzl (Austria) 1106

===== Speed skating =====
- World Cup 6 in Kolomna, Russia:
  - Men:
    - 100 m: (1) Yuya Oikawa (Japan) 09.61 (2) Joji Kato (Japan) 09.66 (3) Zhang Zhongqi (China) 09.81
    - 500 m: (1) Tucker Fredricks (United States) 34.81 (2) Keiichiro Nagashima (Japan) 34.87 (3) Yu Fengtong (China) 34.89
    - 1000 m: (1) Denny Morrison (Canada) 1:08.53 (2) Stefan Groothuis (Netherlands) 1:08.67 (3) Mark Tuitert (Netherlands) 1:09.09
  - Women:
    - 100 m: (1) Jenny Wolf (Germany) 10.33 (2) Judith Hesse (Germany) 10.56 (3) Xing Aihua (China) 10.59
    - 500 m: (1) Jenny Wolf (Germany) 37.67 (2) Jin Peiyu (China) 38.01 (3) Yu Jing (China) 38.13
    - 1000 m: (1) Margot Boer (Netherlands) 1:15.79 (2) Anni Friesinger (Germany) 1:15.81 (3) Christine Nesbitt (Canada) 1:15.85

=== January 24, 2009 (Saturday) ===
==== College Football bowl game ====
- 2009 Senior Bowl, Mobile, Alabama
  - South 35, North 18
    - West Virginia's Pat White led the all-star South squad to a 35–18 victory in the annual game.

==== Cricket ====
- Sri Lanka in Pakistan:
  - 3rd ODI in Lahore:
    - Sri Lanka 309/5 (50 ov); Pakistan 75 (22.5 ov). Sri Lanka win by 234 runs and win the 3-match series 2–1.
      - Pakistan's 75 is the lowest ever score in an ODI at Gaddafi Stadium.

==== Cycling ====
- UCI ProTour:
  - Tour Down Under:
    - Stage 5, Snapper Point – Willunga, 148 km: (1) Allan Davis (Australia) 3hr 28min 33sec, (2) Jose Rojas (Spain) same time, (3) Martin Elmiger (Switzerland) s.t.
      - Overall standings: (1) Davis 17hr 44min 59sec, (2) Stuart O'Grady (Australia) at 25secs, (3) Rojas 30 ... 29. Lance Armstrong (United States) 49

==== Football (soccer) ====
- UNCAF Nations Cup in Tegucigalpa, Honduras:
  - Group 1:
    - Belize 1–4 El Salvador
    - Honduras 4–1 Nicaragua
      - Honduras advance to the semifinals.

==== Handball ====
- World Men's Championship in Croatia:
  - Group I:
    - Slovakia 23–20 South Korea
    - Hungary 27–20 Croatia
    - France 28–21 Sweden
  - Group II:
    - Macedonia 27–29 Norway
    - Poland 32–28 Denmark
    - Germany 35–35 Serbia
  - President's Cup–Group I:
    - Argentina 26–25 Kuwait
    - Australia 10–42 Spain
    - Romania 39–28 Cuba
  - President's Cup–Group II:
    - Tunisia 28–21 Saudi Arabia
    - Algeria 28–22 Egypt
    - Russia 25–22 Brazil

==== Rugby union ====
- Heineken Cup Pool stage, week 6:
  (teams in **bold** advance to the quarterfinals)
  - Pool 1:
    - Sale Sharks (England) 26–17 (France) Clermont
  - Pool 3:
    - Ospreys (Wales) 15–9 (England) **Leicester Tigers**
      - Leicester's bonus-point loss is enough to put the Tigers top of the group. Ospreys would qualify as one of the two best runners-up after the next day's results.
    - Benetton Treviso (Italy) 16–48 (France) Perpignan
  - Pool 4:
    - **Harlequins** (England) 29–24 (Wales) Scarlets
      - Quins' bonus-point win improves their chances of a home quarterfinal.
    - Stade Français (France) 24–19 (Ireland) Ulster

==== Tennis ====
- Australian Open in Melbourne, day 6:
  (top 10 seeds results; seeding in parentheses)
  - Men's singles 3rd round:
    - Rafael Nadal (Spain) (1) bt Tommy Haas (Germany) 6–4, 6–2, 6–2
    - Andy Murray (United Kingdom) (4) bt Jürgen Melzer (Austria) (31) 7–5, 6–0, 6–3
    - Jo-Wilfried Tsonga (France) (5) bt Dudi Sela (Israel) 6–4, 6–2, 1–6, 6–1
    - Gilles Simon (France) (6) bt Mario Ančić (Croatia) 7–6 (2), 6–4, 6–2
    - James Blake (United States) (9) bt Igor Andreev (Russia) (18) 6–3, 6–2, 3–6, 6–1
      - The top 9 seeds are all safely through to the fourth round.
  - Women's singles 3rd round:
    - Serena Williams (United States) (2) bt Peng Shuai (China) 6–1, 6–4
    - Elena Dementieva (Russia) (4) bt Samantha Stosur (Australia) 7–6 (6), 6–4
    - Svetlana Kuznetsova (Russia) (8) bt Alona Bondarenko (Ukraine) (31) 7–6 (7), 6–4

==== Winter sports ====
===== Alpine skiing =====
- Women's World Cup in Cortina d'Ampezzo, Italy:
  - Downhill: (1) Dominique Gisin (Switzerland) 1:16.98 (2) Lindsey Vonn (United States) 1:17.13 (3) Anja Pärson (Sweden) 1:17.15
    - Gisin's win follows her first World Cup victory at Altenmarkt-Zauchensee last week.
    - World Cup overall standings (after 18 races): (1) Vonn 856 pts (2) Maria Riesch (Germany) 810 (3) Paerson 762
- Men's World Cup in Kitzbühel, Austria:
  - Downhill: (1) Didier Défago (Switzerland) 1:56.09 (2) Michael Walchhofer (Austria) 1:56.26 (3) Klaus Kröll (Austria) 1:56.38
    - Défago, who didn't win a World Cup downhill until last week, wins two prestigious races on the Lauberhorn and Hahnenkamm in succession.
    - World Cup overall standings (after 22 of 37 races): (1) Benjamin Raich (Austria) 660 pts (2) Aksel Lund Svindal (Norway) 610 (3) Defago 595

===== Bandy =====
- World Championship in Västerås, Sweden:
  - Semifinals:
    - **Sweden** 8–3 Kazakhstan
    - **Russia** 10–4 Finland

===== Biathlon =====
- World Cup 6 in Antholz, Italy:
  - Women's 10 km Pursuit: (1) Anna Boulygina (Russia) 32min 49.8sec (2 penalties) (2) Kaisa Maekaerainen (Finland) at 2.3 (1) (3) Darya Domracheva (Belarus) 2.3 (2)
    - Overall World Cup standings (after 13 of 26 events): (1) Ekaterina Iourieva (Russia) 507 points (2) Svetlana Sleptsova (Russia) 481 (3) Kati Wilhelm (Germany) 477
  - Men's 12.5 km Pursuit: (1) Björn Ferry (Sweden) 33:19.4 (1) (2) Simon Eder (Austria) at 17.6sec (0) (3) Emil Hegle Svendsen (Norway) 24.7 (3)
    - Overall World Cup standings (after 13 of 26 events): (1) Svendsen 568 points (2) Tomasz Sikora (Poland) 518 (3) Carl-Johan Bergman (Sweden) 436

===== Cross-country skiing =====
- World Cup in Otepää, Estonia:
  - Women's 10 km classic: (1) Justyna Kowalczyk (Poland) 26:25.6 (2) Aino-Kaisa Saarinen (Finland) 26:51.8 (3) Virpi Kuitunen (Finland) 27:12.2
    - World Cup overall standings: (1) Saarinen 1058 points (2) Kuitunen 967 (3) Kowalczyk 954
  - Men's 15 km classic: (1) Lukáš Bauer (Czech Republic) 35min 43.5sec (2) Johan Olsson (Sweden) at 1.5 (3) Vincent Vittoz (France) 9.3
    - World Cup overall standings (after 18 of 33 events): (1) Dario Cologna (Switzerland) 880 points (2) Petter Northug (Norway) 698 (3) Axel Teichmann (Germany) 631

===== Figure skating =====
- European Championships in Helsinki, Finland:
  - Ladies: (1) Laura Lepistö (Finland) 167.32 (1, 2) (2) Carolina Kostner (Italy) 165.42 (3, 1) (3) Susanna Pöykiö (Finland) 156.31 (2, 3)
- United States Championships in Cleveland, Ohio:
  - Pairs: (1) Keauna McLaughlin/Rockne Brubaker 178.76 (2) Caydee Denney/Jeremy Barrett 176.27 (3) Rena Inoue/John Baldwin 171.08
  - Ice dance: (1) Meryl Davis/Charlie White 201.68 (2) Emily Samuelson/Evan Bates 181.64 (3) Kimberly Navarro/Brent Bommentre 176.30
  - Ladies: (1) Alissa Czisny 178.06 pts (2) Rachael Flatt 173.78 (3) Caroline Zhang 171.08

===== Freestyle skiing =====
- World Cup in Mont Gabriel, Canada:
  - Moguls men: (1) Vincent Marquiz (Canada) 25.77 (2) Alexandre Bilodeau (Canada) 25.50 (3) Pierre-Alexandre Rousseau (Canada) 25.39
  - Moguls women: (1) Aiko Uemura (Japan) 25.53 (2) Jennifer Heil (Canada) 25.51 (3) Hannah Kearney (United States) 24.89

===== Luge =====
- World Cup 7 in Altenberg, Germany:
  - Doubles: (1) Christian Oberstolz/Patrick Gruber (Italy) (2) Patric Leitner/Alexander Resch (Germany) (3) Andreas Linger/Wolfgang Linger (Austria)
    - World Cup standings (after 7 of 9 races): (1) Oberstolz/Gruber 580 pts (2) Leitner/Resch 484 (3) Linger/Linger 470
  - Women's: (1) Natalie Geisenberger (Germany) (2) Tatjana Hüfner (Germany) (3) Anke Wischnewski (Germany)
    - World Cup standings (after 7 of 9 races): (1) Hüfner 670 pts (2) Geisenberger 600 (3) Wischnewski 462

===== Ski jumping =====
- World Cup in Vancouver, British Columbia, Canada:
  - 140m hill: (1) Gregor Schlierenzauer (Austria) 289.2 points (142.0/139.5m) (2) Wolfgang Loitzl (Austria) 274.1 (136.5/135.5) (3) Matti Hautamaeki (Finland) 270.6 (136.5/135.5)
    - Schlierenzauer set a hill record with his first jump of 142m. His 4th win in 5 events lift him to the top of the World Cup standings.
    - Overall World Cup standings (after 16 of 28 events): (1) Schlierenzauer 1,220 points (2) Simon Ammann (Switzerland) 1,172 (3) Loitzl 1,061

===== Snowboarding =====
- World Championship in Gangwon-do, South Korea:
  - Big air men: (1) Markku Koski (Finland) 55.6 points (2) Seppe Smits (Belgium) 53.0 (3) Stefan Gimpl (Austria) 51.0

===== Speed skating =====
- World Cup 6 in Kolomna, Russia:
  - Men:
    - 500 m: (1) Keiichiro Nagashima (Japan) 34.85 (2) Yu Fengtong (China) 34.89 (3) Yuya Oikawa (Japan) 34.96
    - 1000 m: (1) Denny Morrison (Canada) 1:08.71 (2) Stefan Groothuis (Netherlands) 1:08.97 (3) Yevgeny Lalenkov (Russia) 1:09.02
  - Women:
    - 500 m: (1) Jenny Wolf (Germany) 37.51 (2) Annette Gerritsen (Netherlands) 38.02 (3) Yu Jing (China) 38.17
    - 1000 m: (1) Margot Boer (Netherlands) 1:15.84 (2) Yu Jing (China) 1:16.04 (3) Christine Nesbitt (Canada) 1:16.26

=== January 23, 2009 (Friday) ===
==== American football ====
- NFL News:
  - Herman Edwards was fired as the head coach of the Kansas City Chiefs.

==== Cricket ====
- South Africa in Australia:
  - 3rd ODI in Sydney:
    - Australia 269 (49.2 ov); South Africa 270/7 (46.3 ov). South Africa win by 3 wickets, lead 5-match series 2–1.
- Zimbabwe in Bangladesh:
  - 3rd ODI in Dhaka:
    - Zimbabwe 119/9 (37 ov); Bangladesh 124/4 (32.3 ov). Bangladesh win by 6 wickets, win 3-match series 2–1.

==== Cycling ====
- UCI ProTour:
  - Tour Down Under:
    - Stage 4, Burnside Village – Angaston, 143 km: (1) Allan Davis (Australia) Quick Step 3hr 29min 35sec, (2) Graeme Brown (Australia) same time, (3) Jose Rojas (Spain) s.t.
      - Overall standings: (1) Davis 14hr 16min 36sec, (2) Brown at 4secs, (3) Stuart O'Grady (Australia) 15

==== Football (soccer) ====
- UNCAF Nations Cup in Tegucigalpa, Honduras:
  - Group 2:
    - Costa Rica 3–0 Panama

==== Rugby union ====
- Heineken Cup Pool stage, week 6:
  (teams in **bold** advance to the quarterfinals)
  - Pool 6:
    - **Cardiff Blues** (Wales) 62–20 (Italy) Calvisano
      - The Blues win secures them the top seed in the knockout phase.
    - Biarritz (France) 24–10 (England) Gloucester
      - Gloucester's defeat by more than seven points and Biarritz's failure to score four tries mean that both teams are eliminated.

==== Tennis ====
- Australian Open in Melbourne, day 5:
  (top 10 seeds results; seeding in parentheses)
  - Men's singles 3rd round:
    - Roger Federer (Switzerland) (2) bt Marat Safin (Russia) (26) 6–3, 6–2, 7–6 (5)
    - Novak Djokovic (Serbia) (3) bt Amer Delić (United States) 6–2, 4–6, 6–3, 7–6 (4)
      - Following this match, outside the Rod Laver Arena, Bosnian and Serb fans fought one another, mostly by throwing chairs. (Fox News (USA))
    - Andy Roddick (United States) (7) bt Fabrice Santoro (France) 6–3, 6–4, 6–2
    - Juan Martín del Potro (Argentina) (8) bt Gilles Müller (Luxembourg) 6–7 (5), 7–5, 6–3, 7–5
  - Women's singles 3rd round:
    - Jelena Janković (Serbia) (1) bt Ai Sugiyama (Japan) (26) 6–4, 6–4
    - Dinara Safina (Russia) (3) bt Kaia Kanepi (Estonia) (25) 6–2, 6–2
    - Alisa Kleybanova (Russia) (29) bt Ana Ivanovic (Serbia) (5) 7–5, 6–7 (5), 6–2
    - Vera Zvonareva (Russia) (7) bt Sara Errani (Italy) 6–4, 6–1
    - Nadia Petrova (Russia) (10) bt Galina Voskoboeva (Kazakhstan) 6–1 retired

==== Winter sports ====
===== Alpine skiing =====
- Men's World Cup in Kitzbühel, Austria:
  - Super giant slalom: (1) Klaus Kröll (Austria) 1:12.78 (2) Aksel Lund Svindal (Norway) 1:13.00 (3) Ambrosi Hoffmann (Switzerland) 1:13.17
    - Overall World Cup standings (after 21 of 37 events): (1) Benjamin Raich (Austria) 638 pts (2) Svindal 598 (3) Jean-Baptiste Grange (France) 576

===== Biathlon =====
- World Cup 6 in Antholz, Italy:
  - Men's 10 km Sprint: (1) Emil Hegle Svendsen (Norway) 24:52.5 (0) (2) Björn Ferry (Sweden) at 3.6 (0) (3) Tomasz Sikora (Poland) 6.7 (0)
    - Overall World Cup standings (after 12 of 26 events): (1) Svendsen 520 points (2) Tomasz Sikora (Poland) 475 (3) Carl-Johan Bergman (Sweden) 413

===== Figure skating =====
- European Championships in Helsinki, Finland:
  - Ice dance final results (free dance in brackets): (1) Jana Khoklova / Sergei Novitski (Russia) 196.91 (97.31) (2) Federica Faiella / Massimo Scali (Italy) 186.17 (91.11) (3) Sinead Kerr / John Kerr (United Kingdom) 185.20 (92.60)
  - Ladies' short program: (1) Laura Lepistö (Finland) 56.62 points (2) Susanna Pöykiö (Finland) 56.06 (3) Carolina Kostner (Italy) 51.36
- United States Championships in Cleveland, Ohio:
  - Men's short program: (1) Jeremy Abbott 86.40pts (2) Evan Lysacek 83.59 (3) Parker Pennington 76.17

===== Snowboarding =====
- World Championship in Gangwon-do, South Korea:
  - Half pipe men: (1) Ryoh Aono (Japan) 47.3 points, (2) Jeff Batchelor (Canada) 44.4, (3) Mathieu Crepel (France) 43.3
  - Half pipe women: (1) Jiayu Liu (China) 43.5 points, (2) Holly Crawford (Australia) 39.6, (3) Paulina Ligocki (Poland) 38.5

=== January 22, 2009 (Thursday) ===
==== Baseball ====
- Major League Baseball news:
  - Tribune Company has sold the Chicago Cubs, Wrigley Field and twenty percent interest in Comcast SportsNet Chicago to the Ricketts family for US $900 million, pending the approval of Major League Baseball.

==== Basketball ====
- NBA News:
  - Marc Iavaroni was sacked as the coach of the Memphis Grizzlies, and replaced on an interim basis by Johnny Davis.

==== Cycling ====
- UCI ProTour:
  - Tour Down Under:
    - Stage 3, Unley – Victor Harbor, 136 km: (1) Graeme Brown (Australia) Rabobank 3h 15' 35" (2) Allan Davis (Australia) Quick Step s.t. (3) Stuart O'Grady (Australia) Team Saxo Bank s.t.

==== Football (soccer) ====
- UNCAF Nations Cup in Tegucigalpa, Honduras:
  - Group 1:
    - El Salvador 1–1 Nicaragua
    - Honduras 2–1 Belize

==== Handball ====
- World Men's Championship in Croatia:
  (teams in **bold** advance to the top 12 stage)
  - Group A:
    - **Slovakia** 28–23 Romania
    - **France** 27–22 **Hungary**
    - Argentina 36–16 Australia
  - Group B:
    - Spain 23–24 **South Korea**
    - **Croatia** 30–26 **Sweden**
    - Kuwait 23–26 Cuba
  - Group C:
    - **North Macedonia** 36–30 Russia
    - **Germany** 30–23 **Poland**
    - Tunisia 36–25 Algeria
  - Group D:
    - Egypt 25–22 Brazil
    - **Denmark** 32–28 **Norway**
    - **Serbia** 38–29 Saudi Arabia

==== Tennis ====
- Australian Open in Melbourne, day 4:
  (top 10 seeds results; seeding in parentheses)
  - Men's singles 2nd round:
    - Rafael Nadal (Spain) (1) bt Roko Karanušić (Croatia) 6–2, 6–3, 6–2
    - Andy Murray (United Kingdom) (4) bt Marcel Granollers (Spain) 6–4, 6–2, 6–2
    - Jo-Wilfried Tsonga (France) (5) bt Ivan Ljubičić (Croatia) 6–7 (4), 7–6 (8), 7–6 (7), 6–2
    - Gilles Simon (France) (6) bt Chris Guccione (Australia) 6–7 (5), 6–4, 6–1, 6–2
    - James Blake (United States) (9) bt Sébastien de Chaunac (France) 6–3, 6–2, 6–3
  - Women's singles 2nd round:
    - Serena Williams (United States) (2) bt Gisela Dulko (Argentina) 6–3, 7–5
    - Elena Dementieva (Russia) (4) bt Iveta Benešová (Czech Republic) 6–4, 6–1
    - Carla Suárez Navarro (Spain) bt Venus Williams (United States) (6) 2–6, 6–3, 7–5
    - Svetlana Kuznetsova (Russia) (8) bt Tatjana Malek (Germany) 6–2, 6–2

==== Winter sports ====
===== Bandy =====
- World Championship in Västerås, Sweden:
  (teams in **bold** advance to the semifinals)
  - Group A:
    - Belarus 3–13 **Sweden**
    - **Kazakhstan** 7–2 Norway
    - **Russia** 15–3 **Finland**

===== Biathlon =====
- World Cup 6 in Antholz, Italy:
  - Women's 7.5 km Sprint: (1) Tora Berger (Norway) 21' 25.5" (2) Darya Domracheva (Belarus) 21' 33.6" (3) Kati Wilhelm (Germany) 21' 46.2"
    - Overall World Cup standings (after 12 of 26 events): (1) Svetlana Sleptsova (Russia) 481 points, (2) Ekaterina Iourieva (Russia) 473, (3) Wilhelm 437

===== Figure skating =====
- European Championships in Helsinki, Finland:
  - Men: (1) Brian Joubert (France) 232.01 points (1, 2) (2) Samuel Contestini (Italy) 220.92 (3, 3) (3) Kevin van der Perren (Belgium) 219.36 (4, 4)
  - Ice dance (after original dance): (1) Jana Khokhlova / Sergei Novitski (Russia) 99.60 points (1, 1) (2) Federica Faiella / Massimo Scali (Italy) 95.06 (2, 2) (3) Sinead Kerr / John Kerr (United Kingdom) 92.60 (3, 3)
- United States Championships in Cleveland, Ohio:
  - Ladies short programme: (1) Alissa Czisny 65.75 pts (2) Rachael Flatt 60.19 (3) Caroline Zhang 58.91
  - Pairs short programme: (1) Caydee Denney/Jeremy Barrett 61.51 pts (2) Keauna McLaughlin/Rockne Brubaker 61.12 (3) Rena Inoue/John Baldwin 61.11
  - Ice dance (after original dance): (1) Meryl Davis/Charlie White 101.86 (2) Emily Samuelson/Evan Bates 93.25 (3) Kimberly Navarro/Brent Bommentre 89.52

=== January 21, 2009 (Wednesday) ===
==== Basketball ====
- NCAA Men's Basketball:
  - The New Jersey Institute of Technology ended the longest losing streak in Division I Men's Basketball at 57 games by defeating Bryant College, 61–51. The school last won a game against Longwood University on February 19, 2007.

==== Cricket ====
- Zimbabwe in Bangladesh:
  - 2nd ODI in Dhaka:
    - Zimbabwe 160/9 (50 ov); Bangladesh 164/4 (44.5 ov). Bangladesh win by 6 wickets, 3-match series tied 1–1.
- Sri Lanka in Pakistan:
  - 2nd ODI in Karachi:
    - Sri Lanka 290/8 (50 ov); Pakistan 161 (34.5 ov). Sri Lanka win by 129 runs, 3-match series tied 1–1.

==== Cycling ====
- UCI ProTour:
  - Tour Down Under:
    - Stage 2, Hahndorf – Stirling, 145 km: (1) Allan Davis (Australia) Quick Step 3h 46' 25" (2) Graeme Brown (Australia) Rabobank s.t. (3) Martin Elmiger (Switzerland) AG2R La Mondiale +2"

==== Handball ====
- World Men's Championship in Croatia:
  (teams in **bold** advance to the Top 12 stage)
  - Group A:
    - Slovakia 26–35 **France**
    - **Hungary** 31–20 Argentina
    - Australia 20–40 Romania
  - Group B:
    - Spain 22–32 **Croatia**
    - **Sweden** 30–19 Kuwait
    - Cuba 26–31 South Korea
  - Group C:
    - North Macedonia 23–33 **Germany**
    - **Poland** 31–27 Tunisia
    - Algeria 28–29 Russia
  - Group D:
    - Egypt 17–26 **Denmark**
    - **Norway** 26–27 Serbia
    - Saudi Arabia 24–26 Brazil

==== Ice hockey ====
- Champions Hockey League Finals, first leg:
  - Metallurg Magnitogorsk (Russia) 2–2 (Switzerland) ZSC Lions

==== Tennis ====
- Australian Open in Melbourne, day 3:
  (top 10 seeds results; seeding in parentheses)
  - Men's singles 2nd round:
    - Roger Federer (Switzerland) (2) def. Evgeny Korolev (Russia) 6–2, 6–3, 6–1
    - Novak Djokovic (Serbia) (3) def. Jérémy Chardy (France) 7–5, 6–1, 6–3
    - Andy Roddick (United States) (7) def. Xavier Malisse (Belgium) 4–6, 6–2, 7–6, 6–2
    - Juan Martín del Potro (Argentina) (8) def. Florian Mayer (Germany) 6–1, 7–5, 6–2
    - Lu Yen-hsun (Chinese Taipei) def. David Nalbandian (Argentina) (10) 6–4, 5–7, 4–6, 6–4, 6–2
  - Women's singles 2nd round:
    - Jelena Janković (Serbia) (1) def. Kirsten Flipkens (Belgium) 6–4, 7–5
    - Dinara Safina (Russia) (3) def. Ekaterina Makarova (Russia) 6–7 (3), 6–3, 6–0
    - Ana Ivanovic (Serbia) (5) def. Alberta Brianti (Italy) 6–3, 6–2
    - Vera Zvonareva (Russia) (7) def. Edina Gallovits (Romania) 6–0, 6–0
    - Nadia Petrova (Russia) (10) def. Sania Mirza (India) 6–3, 6–2

==== Winter sports ====
===== Bandy =====
- World Championship in Västerås, Sweden:
  - Group A:
    - Belarus 5–6 Norway
    - Sweden 2–2 Russia
    - Kazakhstan 1–8 Finland

===== Figure skating =====
- European Championships in Helsinki, Finland:
  - Pairs: (1) Aliona Savchenko / Robin Szolkowy (Germany) 199.07 points (2 SP, 1 FS) (2) Yuko Kawaguchi / Alexander Smirnov (Russia) 182.77 (3, 2) (3) Maria Mukhortova / Maxim Trankov (Russia) 182.07 (1, 4)
  - Men's short program: (1) Brian Joubert (France) 86.90 points (2) Tomáš Verner (Czech Republic) 81.45 (3) Samuel Contesti (Italy) 75.95
- United States Championships in Cleveland, Ohio:
  - Compulsory Dance: (1) Meryl Davis/Charlie White 39.93 pts (2) Emily Samuelson/Evan Bates 36.28 (3) Kimberly Navarro/Brent Bommentre 35.22

===== Snowboarding =====
- World Championship in Gangwon-do, South Korea:
  - Parallel slalom men: (1) Benjamin Karl (Austria) , (2) Sylvain Dufour (France) , (3) Patrick Bussler (Germany)
  - Parallel slalom women: (1) Fraenzi Maegert-Kohli (Switzerland) , (2) Doris Guenther (Austria) , (3) Ekaterina Tudegesheva (Russia)

=== January 20, 2009 (Tuesday) ===
==== Cricket ====
- Sri Lanka in Pakistan:
  - 1st ODI in Karachi:
    - Sri Lanka 219 (45.2 ov); Pakistan 220/2 (45.5 ov). Pakistan win by 8 wickets and lead 3-match series 1–0.

==== Cycling ====
- UCI ProTour:
  - Tour Down Under:
    - Stage 1, Norwood – Mawson Lakes, 140 km: (1) André Greipel (Germany) Team Columbia 3h 45' 27" (2) Baden Cooke (Australia) UniSA s.t. (3) Stuart O'Grady (Australia) Team Saxo Bank s.t.

==== Tennis ====
- Australian Open in Melbourne, day 2:
  (top 10 seeds results; seeding in parentheses)
  - Men's singles 1st round:
    - Rafael Nadal (Spain) (1) def. Christophe Rochus (Belgium) 6–0, 6–2, 6–2
    - Andy Murray (United Kingdom) (4) def. Andrei Pavel (Romania) 6–2, 3–1 (ret.)
    - Jo-Wilfried Tsonga (France) (5) def. Juan Mónaco (Argentina) 6–4, 6–4, 6–0
    - Gilles Simon (France) (6) def. Pablo Andújar (Spain) 6–4, 6–1, 6–1
    - James Blake (United States) (9) def. Frank Dancevic (Canada) 6–4, 6–3, 7–5
  - Women's singles 1st round:
    - Serena Williams (United States) (2) def. Meng Yuan (China) 6–3, 6–2
    - Elena Dementieva (Russia) (4) def. Kristina Barrois (Germany) 7–6, 2–6, 6–1
    - Venus Williams (United States) (6) def. Angelique Kerber (Germany) 6–3, 6–3
    - Svetlana Kuznetsova (Russia) (8) def. Anastasia Rodionova (Australia) 6–2, 3–6, 6–3
    - Kateryna Bondarenko (Ukraine) def. Agnieszka Radwańska (Poland) (9) 7–6, 4–6, 6–1

==== Winter sports ====
===== Bandy =====
- World Championship in Västerås, Sweden:
  - Group A:
    - Belarus 1–12 Finland
    - Russia 13–2 Kazakhstan
    - Sweden 15–3 Norway

===== Figure skating =====
- European Championships in Helsinki, Finland:
  - Compulsory dance: (1) Jana Khokhlova/Sergei Novitski (Russia) 37.43 pts (2) Federica Faiella/Massimo Scali (Italy) 36.03 (3) Sinead Kerr/John Kerr (United Kingdom) 34.89
  - Pairs' short program: (1) Maria Mukhortova/Maxim Trankov (Russia) 69.62 pts (2) Aliona Savchenko/Robin Szolkowy (Germany) 66.64 (3) Yuko Kawaguchi/Alexander Smirnov (Russia) 65.38

===== Snowboarding =====
- World Championship in Gangwon-do, South Korea:
  - Parallel giant slalom men: (1) Jasey Jay Anderson (Canada) (2) Sylvain Dufour (France) (3) Matthew Morison (Canada)
  - Parallel giant slalom women: (1) Marion Kreiner (Austria) (2) Doris Guenther (Austria) (3) Patrizia Kummer (Switzerland)

=== January 19, 2009 (Monday) ===
==== Cricket ====
- Zimbabwe in Bangladesh:
  - 1st ODI in Dhaka:
    - Bangladesh 124 (48.1 ov); Zimbabwe 127/8 (49.2 ov). Zimbabwe win by 2 wickets and lead 3-match series 1–0.

==== Handball ====
- World Men's Championship in Croatia:
  - Group A:
    - Romania 30–26 Argentina
    - Hungary 24–24 Slovakia
    - France 42–11 Australia
  - Group B:
    - South Korea 34–19 Kuwait
    - Sweden 34–30 Spain
    - Croatia 41–20 Cuba
  - Group C:
    - Poland 29–30 North Macedonia
    - Germany 32–20 Algeria
    - Russia 36–31 Tunisia
  - Group D:
    - Brazil 32–30 Serbia
    - Norway 30–20 Egypt
    - Denmark 32–13 Saudi Arabia

==== Tennis ====
- Australian Open in Melbourne, day 1:
  (top 10 seeds results; seeding in parentheses)
  - Men's singles 1st round:
    - Roger Federer (Switzerland) (2) def. Andreas Seppi (Italy) 6–1, 7–6 (4), 7–5
    - Novak Djokovic (Serbia) (3) def. Andrea Stoppini (Italy) 6–2, 6–3, 7–5
    - Andy Roddick (United States) (7) def. Björn Rehnquist (Sweden) 6–0, 6–2, 6–2
    - Juan Martín del Potro (Argentina) (8) def. Mischa Zverev (Germany) 6–3, 6–4, 6–2
    - David Nalbandian (Argentina) (10) def. Marc Gicquel (France) 6–4, 4–6, 6–2, 6–3
  - Women's singles 1st round:
    - Jelena Janković (Serbia) (1) def. Yvonne Meusburger (Austria) 6–1, 6–3
    - Dinara Safina (Russia) (3) def. Alla Kudryavtseva (Russia) 6–3, 6–4
    - Ana Ivanovic (Serbia) (5) def. Julia Görges (Germany) 7–5, 6–3
    - Vera Zvonareva (Russia) (7) def. Magdaléna Rybáriková (Slovakia) 7–6 (2), 6–0
    - Nadia Petrova (Russia) (10) def. Yaroslava Shvedova (Kazakhstan) 6–3, 7–6 (3)

==== Winter sports ====
===== Bandy =====
- World Championship in Västerås, Sweden:
  - Group A:
    - Russia 14–2 Belarus
    - Norway 5–0 Finland
    - Kazakhstan 3–4 Sweden

===== Freestyle skiing =====
- World Cup in Lake Placid, New York, United States:
  - Skicross men: (1) Lars Lewens (Sweden) (2) Patrick Koller (Austria) (3) Tomas Kraus (Czech Republic)
  - Skicross women: (1) Ophelie David (France) (2) Jenny Owens (Australia) (3) Meryl Boulangeat (France)

=== January 18, 2009 (Sunday) ===
==== American football ====
- NFL Playoffs, Conference Championship Games:
  Conference rankings in parentheses
  - NFC: (4) Arizona Cardinals 32, (6) Philadelphia Eagles 25
    - The Cardinals book their first Super Bowl trip behind four Kurt Warner touchdown passes—three to Larry Fitzgerald in the first half, and the last to Tim Hightower after the Cards had blown a 24–6 halftime lead.
  - AFC: (2) Pittsburgh Steelers 23, (6) Baltimore Ravens 14
    - Thanks to Santonio Holmes' 65-yard catch from Ben Roethlisberger and Troy Polamalu 40-yard interception return, the Steelers will attempt to become the first team to win six Lombardi Trophies.

==== Badminton ====
- BWF Super Series:
  - Korea Open Super Series in Seoul:
    (seeding in parentheses)
    - Men's singles: Peter Hoeg Gade (Denmark) (3) bt Lee Chong Wei (Malaysia) (1) 21–18, 10–21, 21–17
    - Women's singles: Tine Rasmussen (Denmark) (2) bt Pi Hongyan (France) (4) 21–19, 21–19
    - Men's doubles: Mathias Boe/Carsten Mogensen (Denmark) (4) bt Jung Jae-Sung/Lee Yong-Dae (South Korea) (2) 21–12, 24–22
    - Women's doubles: Chien Yu Chin/Chieng Wen Hsing (Chinese Taipei) (1) bt Lee Kyung-Won/Lee Hyo-jung (South Korea) (2) 21–19, 21–8
    - Mixed doubles: Lee Yong-Dae/Lee Hyo-jung (South Korea) (2) bt Songphon Anugritayawon/Kunchala Voravichitchaikul (Thailand) (4) 21–8, 21–7

==== Cricket ====
- South Africa in Australia:
  - 2nd ODI in Hobart:
    - Australia 249/9 (50 ov); South Africa 244/6 (50 ov). Australia win by 5 runs and level 5-match series 1–1.

==== Golf ====
- PGA Tour:
  - Sony Open in Hawaiʻi in Honolulu, Hawaiʻi
    - Winner: (United States) Zach Johnson 265 (−15)
- Champions Tour:
  - Wendy's Champions Skins Game in Kāʻanapali, Hawaiʻi:
    - Winners: Fuzzy Zoeller and Ben Crenshaw (13 skins, US $530,000)
- European Tour:
  - Abu Dhabi Golf Championship in Abu Dhabi, United Arab Emirates
    - Winner: (England) Paul Casey 267 (−21)

==== Snooker ====
- Masters in London, United Kingdom:
  - Final: (2) **Ronnie O'Sullivan** (England) def. (1) Mark Selby (England) 10–8

==== Handball ====
- World Men's Championship in Croatia:
  - Group A:
    - Australia 12–47 Slovakia
    - Romania 27–30 Hungary
    - Argentina 26–33 France
  - Group B:
    - Cuba 20–45 Spain
    - South Korea 34–19 Sweden
    - Kuwait 21–40 Croatia
  - Group C:
    - Algeria 19–32 North Macedonia
    - Tunisia 24–26 Germany
    - Russia 22–24 Poland
  - Group D:
    - Brazil 21–39 Norway
    - Saudi Arabia 18–26 Egypt
    - Serbia 36–37 Denmark

==== Rugby union ====
- Heineken Cup pool stage, week 5:
  (teams in **bold** advance to the quarterfinals)
  - Pool 4:
    - Scarlets (Wales) 31–17 (France) Stade Français
      - Stade's loss secures first place in the pool and a quarterfinal berth for (England) **Harlequins**.
  - Pool 5:
    - Newport Gwent Dragons (Wales) 12–15 (England) Bath
      - Bath set up a showdown with (France) Toulouse next weekend, with first place in the pool on the line.
  - Pool 6:
    - Gloucester (England) 12–16 (Wales) **Cardiff Blues**
      - The Blues, playing a man down from the 25th minute, come from behind and claim a quarterfinal berth with a converted try from Bradley Davies in the 76th minute.

==== Winter sports ====
===== Alpine skiing =====
- Men's World Cup in Wengen, Switzerland:
  - Slalom: (1) Manfred Pranger (Austria) 1:40.36 (48.10 + 52.26) (2) Reinfried Herbst (Austria) 1:40.70 (48.44 + 52.26) (3) Ivica Kostelic (Croatia) 1:40.75 (48.80 + 51.95)
    - Overall World Cup standings (after 20 of 38 races): (1) Benjamin Raich (Austria) 638 pts (2) Jean-Baptiste Grange (France) 576 (3) Kostelic 546
- Women's World Cup in Altenmarkt–Zauchensee, Austria:
  - Downhill: (1) Anja Paerson (Sweden) & Dominique Gisin (Switzerland) 1:47.52 (3) Lindsey Vonn (United States) 1:47.69
    - Overall World Cup standings (after 17 of 35 races): (1) Vonn 776 pts (2) Maria Riesch (Germany) 765 (3) Paerson 702

===== Bandy =====
- World Championship in Västerås, Sweden:
  - Group A:
    - Russia 19–0 Norway
    - Sweden 8–1 Finland
    - Kazakhstan 7–5 Belarus

===== Biathlon =====
- World Cup 5 in Ruhpolding, Germany:
  - Women's 10 km Pursuit: (1) Magdalena Neuner (Germany) 32:56.5 (4), (2) Ekaterina Iourieva (Russia) at 8.9s (1), (3) Kati Wilhelm (Germany) 21.7 (3)
    - Overall World Cup standings (after 11 of 26 races): (1) Svetlana Sleptsova (Russia) 481 points, (2) Iourieva 461, (3) Neuner 409
  - Men's 12.5 km Pursuit: (1) Ole Einar Bjørndalen (Norway) 36min 17.4sec (1) (2) Emil Hegle Svendsen (Norway) 34.4 (1) (3) Dominik Landertinger (Austria) 46.5 (2)
    - Overall World Cup standings (after 11 of 26 races): (1) Svendsen 460 points (2) Tomasz Sikora (Poland) 427 (3) Bjørndalen 408

===== Bobsleigh =====
- World Cup 6 and European Championships at Sankt Moritz, Switzerland:
  - Four-man: (1) Alexandre Zoubkov, Roman Oreshnikov, Dmitry Trunenkov, Dmitriy Stepushkin (Russia) 2:10.48 (1:05.20/1:05.28) (2) Thomas Florschütz, Marc Kühne, Andreas Barucha, Alex Metzger (Germany) 2:10.79 (1:05.61/1:05.18) (3) Karl Angerer, Andreas Udvari, Thomas Pöge, Gregor Bermbach (Germany) 2:10.81 (1:05.53/1:05.28)
    - World Cup standings (after 5 of 7 races): (1) Zoubkov 1046 points (2) André Lange (Germany) 955 (3) Jānis Miņins (Latvia) 904

===== Cross-country skiing =====
- World Cup in Vancouver, British Columbia, Canada:
  - Team sprint men: (1) Sweden 19:44.1 (2) Italy 19:44.4 (3) Canada 19:44.7
  - Team sprint women: (1) Italy 17:20.1 (2) Germany 17:30.0 (3) Sweden 17:31.2

===== Curling =====
- World Curling Tour:
  - Glynhill Ladies International in Braehead, Glasgow, Scotland:
    - Women's final: (Canada) Jennifer Jones def. (Switzerland) Binia Feltscher-Beeli 7–6

===== Figure skating =====
- Canadian Championships in Saskatoon, Saskatchewan:
  - Men: (1) Patrick Chan 254.82 (2) Vaughn Chipeur 206.30 (3) Jeremy Ten 204.03

===== Freestyle skiing =====
- World Cup in Lake Placid, New York, United States:
  - Aerials men: (1) Jeret Peterson (United States) 252.59 (2) Kyle Nyssen (Canada) 244.92 (3) Warren Shouldice (Canada) 243.03
  - Aerials women: (1) Alla Tsuper (Belarus) 189.98 (2) Xu Mengtao (China) 186.11 (3) Emily Cook (United States) 184.70

===== Luge =====
- World Cup 6 in Oberhof, Germany:
  - Women: (1) Tatjana Hüfner (Germany) (2) Natalie Geisenberger (Germany) (3) Anke Wischnewski (Germany)

===== Short track speed skating =====
- European Championships in Torino, Italy:
  - Men's overall standings: (1) Nicola Rodigari (Italy) 76 (2) Haralds Silovs (Latvia) 55 (3) Viktor Knoch (Hungary) 55
  - Women's overall standings: (1) Arianna Fontana (Italy) 83 (2) Katerina Novotná (Czech Republic) 76 (3) Stéphanie Bouvier (France) 63

===== Snowboarding =====
- World Championship in Gangwon-do, South Korea:
  - Snowboardcross men: (1) Markus Schairer (Austria) (2) Xavier de Le Rue (France) (3) Nick Baumgartner (United States)
  - Snowboardcross women: (1) Helene Olafsen (Norway) (2) Olivia Nobs (3) Mellie Francon (Switzerland)

===== Speed skating =====
- World Sprint Championships in Moscow, Russia:
  - Men's overall standings: (1) Shani Davis (United States) 139.560 (2) Keiichiro Nagashima (Japan) 139.720 (3) Simon Kuipers (Netherlands) 140.450
  - Women's overall standings: (1) Wang Beixing (China) 152.475 (2) Jenny Wolf (Germany) 153.410 (3) Yu Jing (China) 153.740

=== January 17, 2009 (Saturday) ===
==== American football ====
- NFL News:
  - Less than 24 hours after sacking Jon Gruden as head coach, the Tampa Bay Buccaneers replace him with defensive backs coach Raheem Morris.
  - The St. Louis Rams agree to terms with New York Giants defensive coordinator Steve Spagnuolo on a four-year contract to become the team's new head coach.

==== Auto racing ====
- Rallying:
  - Dakar Rally in Argentina and Chile:
    - Cars: (1) Giniel De Villiers (South Africa) Dirk von Zitzewitz (Germany) 48:10:57 (2) Mark Miller (United States) Ralph Pitchford (South Africa) 48:19:56 (3) Robby Gordon (United States) Andy Grider (United States) 49:57:12
    - Trucks: (1) Firdaus Kabirov (Russia) Aydar Belyaev (Russia) Andrey Mokeev (Russia) 49:34:46 (2) Vladimir Chagin (Russia) Sergey Savostin (Russia) Eduard Nikolaev (Russia) 49:38:25 (3) Gerard De Rooy (Netherlands) Tom Coldoul (Belgium) Marcel Van Melis (Netherlands) 50:34:42
    - Motorbikes: (1) Marc Coma (Spain) 52:14:33 (2) Cyril Despres (France) 53:40:11 (3) David Fretigne (France) 53:53:29
    - Quads: (1) Josef Machacek (Czech Republic) 68:22:06 (2) Marcos Patronelli (Argentina) 70:56:06 (3) Rafal Sonik (Poland) 76:04:40

==== Football (soccer) ====
- Arabian Gulf Cup in Muscat, Oman:
  - Final:
    - **Oman** 0–0 Saudi Arabia
      - Oman win 6–5 in penalty shootout

==== Handball ====
- World Men's Championship in Croatia:
  - Group A:
    - Slovakia 27–25 Argentina
    - Hungary 41–17 Australia
    - France 31–21 Romania
  - Group B:
    - Spain 47–17 Kuwait
    - Sweden 41–14 Cuba
  - Group C:
    - Poland 39–22 Algeria
    - Germany 26–26 Russia
    - North Macedonia 24–25 Tunisia
  - Group D:
    - Norway 39–23 Saudi Arabia
    - Egypt 22–30 Serbia
    - Denmark 40–27 Brazil

==== Mixed martial arts ====
- UFC 93 in Dublin:

==== Rugby union ====
- Heineken Cup pool stage, week 5:
  - Pool 2:
    - London Wasps (England) 19–12 (Ireland) Leinster
  - Pool 3:
    - Leicester Tigers (England) 52–0 (Italy) Benetton Treviso
    - Perpignan (France) 17–15 (Wales) Ospreys
  - Pool 4:
    - Ulster Rugby (Ireland) 21–10 (England) Harlequins
  - Pool 5:
    - Toulouse (France) 26–33 (Scotland) Glasgow
  - Pool 6:
    - Calvisano (Italy) 15–23 (France) Biarritz

==== Tennis ====
- ATP Tour:
  - Medibank International Sydney in Sydney, Australia:
    - Final: (Argentina) **David Nalbandian** def. (Finland) Jarkko Nieminen 6–3, 6–7 (9/11), 6–2
  - Heineken Open in Auckland, New Zealand:
    - Final: (Argentina) **Juan Martín del Potro** def. (United States) Sam Querrey, 6–4, 6–4
- Exhibition tournaments:
  - AAMI Kooyong Classic in Melbourne, Australia:
    - Final: (Switzerland) **Roger Federer** def. (Switzerland) Stanislas Wawrinka 6–1, 6–3

==== Winter sports ====
===== Alpine skiing =====
- Men's World Cup in Wengen, Switzerland:
  - Downhill: (1) Didier Défago (Switzerland) 2:31.98 (2) Bode Miller (United States) 2:32.18 (3) Marco Sullivan (United States) 2:32.37
    - Defago wins his first ever World Cup downhill on the Lauberhorn course as the home crowd celebrate second Swiss victory in two days.
    - Overall World Cup standings (after 19 of 38 races): (1) Benjamin Raich (Austria) 593 points (2) Jean-Baptiste Grange (France) 536 (3) Aksel Lund Svindal (Norway) 518
- Women's World Cup in Altenmarkt–Zauchensee, Austria:
  - Super combined: (1) Lindsey Vonn (United States) 2:40.53 (2) Kathrin Zettel (Austria) 2:40.83 (3) Anja Paerson (Sweden) 2:41.19
    - Overall World Cup standings (after 16 of 35 races): (1) Maria Riesch (Germany) 729 points (2) Vonn 716 (3) Zettel 651

===== Biathlon =====
- World Cup 5 in Ruhpolding, Germany:
  - Men's 10 km Sprint: (1) Ole Einar Bjørndalen (Norway) 23:25.8 (0 penalty laps) (2) Dominik Landertinger (Austria) at 33.4 (0) (3) Emil Hegle Svendsen (Norway) 35.3 (1)
    - World Cup overall standings (after 10 of 26 events): (1) Svendsen 406 points (2) Tomasz Sikora (Poland) 393 (3) Bjørndalen 348

===== Bobsleigh =====
- World Cup 6 and European Championships at Sankt Moritz, Switzerland:
  - Two-man: (1) Pierre Lueders/David Bissett (Canada) 2:12.08 (1:06.21/1:05.87) (2) André Lange/Martin Putze (Germany) 2:12.10 (1:06.23/1:05.87) Beat Hefti/Thomas Lamparter (Switzerland) 2:12.23 (1:06.36/1:05.87)
    - European Championship: (1) Lange/Putze (2) Hefti/Lamparter (3) Thomas Florschütz/Marc Kuehne (Germany) (4th overall)
    - World Cup standings (after 6 of 8 races): (1) Hefti 1171 points (2) Lange 1141 (3) Ivo Rüegg (Switzerland) 1020

===== Cross-country skiing =====
- World Cup in Vancouver, British Columbia, Canada:
  - Men's 15 km classic/15 km freestyle pursuit: (1) Pietro Piller Cottrer (Italy) 1hr 13min 1.5sec (2) Jean-Marc Gaillard (France) 15.0 (3) Valerio Checci (Italy) 15.3
    - Overall World Cup standings (after 17 of 33 events): (1) Dario Cologna (Switzerland) 835 points (2) Petter Northug (Norway) 698 (3) Axel Teichmann (Germany) 581
  - Women's 7.5 km classic/7.5 km freestyle Pursuit: (1) Justyna Kowalczyk (Poland) 40:41.3 (2) Marianna Longa (Italy) 40:48.9 (3) Arianna Follis (Italy) 41:27.3
    - Overall World Cup standings (after 16 of 33 events): (1) Aino-Kaisa Saarinen (Finland) 978 points (2) Virpi Kuitunen (Finland) 907 (3) Petra Majdič (Slovenia) 893

===== Figure skating =====
- Canadian Championships in Saskatoon, Saskatchewan:
  - Women: (1) Joannie Rochette 185.35 (2) Cynthia Phaneuf 151.42 (3) Amélie Lacoste 143.01
  - Pairs: (1) Jessica Dubé / Bryce Davison 188.43 (2) Meagan Duhamel / Craig Buntin 182.50 (3) Mylène Brodeur / John Mattatall 159.85
  - Ice dancing: (1) Tessa Virtue / Scott Moir 197.77 (2) Vanessa Crone / Paul Poirier 175.58 (3) Kaitlyn Weaver / Andrew Poje 170.23

===== Luge =====
- World Cup 6 in Oberhof, Germany:
  - Men: (1) Jan Eichhorn (Germany) (2) Felix Loch (Germany) (3) David Möller (GER)
    - World Cup standings (after 6 of 9 races): (1) Armin Zöggeler (Italy) 501 points (2) Möller 455 (3) Eichhorn 375
  - Doubles: (1) Tobias Wendl/Tobias Arlt (Germany) (2) Patric Leitner/Alexander Resch (Germany) (3) André Florschütz/Torsten Wustlich (Germany)
    - World Cup standings (after 6 of 9 races): (1) Christian Oberstolz/Patrick Gruber (Italy) 480 points (2) Wendl/Arlt 405 (3) Andreas Linger/Wolfgang Linger (Austria) 400

===== Nordic combined =====
- World Cup in Vancouver, British Columbia, Canada:
  - 10 km Gundersen: (1) Magnus Moan (Norway) 25:18.7 (2) Bjoern Kircheisen (Germany) 25:19.1 (3) Bill Demong (United States) 25:19.2
    - World Cup standings (after 13 out of 24 races): (1) Anssi Koivuranta (Finland) 773 points (2) Moan 701 (3) Demong 675

===== Skeleton =====
- World Cup 6 and European Championships at Sankt Moritz, Switzerland:
  - Men: (1) Frank Rommel (Germany) 2:15.77 (1:08.08/1:07.69) (2) Kristan Bromley (United Kingdom) 2:16.74 (1:08.37/1:08.37) (3) Gregor Stähli (Switzerland) 2:16.79 (1:08.36/1:08.43)
    - World Cup standings (after 5 of 7 events): (1) Aleksandr Tretyakov (Russia) 924 points (2) Florian Grassl (Germany) 907 (3) Rommel 900

===== Ski jumping =====
- World Cup in Zakopane, Poland:
  - 134m hill: (1) Gregor Schlierenzauer (Austria) 285.7 points (130.5/138.5m) (2) Wolfgang Loitzl (Austria) 280.7 (130.0/136.5) (3) Simon Ammann (Switzerland) 271.2 (127.5/134.0)
    - World Cup standings (after 15 of 28 events): (1) Ammann 1,122 points (2) Schlierenzauer 1,120 (3) Loitzl 981

=== January 16, 2009 (Friday) ===
==== American football ====
- NFL News:
  - The Tampa Bay Buccaneers fire head coach Jon Gruden and General Manager Bruce Allen after a disappointing December in which they lost 4 games in a row and missed the playoffs.

==== Cricket ====
- South Africa in Australia:
  - 1st ODI in Melbourne:
    - Australia 271/8 (50 ov); South Africa 272/7 (49.3 ov). South Africa win by 3 wickets and lead 5-match series 1–0.
- Tri-Series in Bangladesh:
  - Final in Dhaka:
    - Bangladesh 152 (50 overs); Sri Lanka 153/8 (48.1 overs). Sri Lanka win by 2 wickets.
      - Bangladesh reduce Sri Lanka to 6 for 5 after eight overs, the lowest score ever recorded in ODI history at the fall of the 5th wicket. Sri Lanka fights back to take the Tri-Series with 59 runs from Kumar Sangakkara and 33 not out by Muttiah Muralitharan off 16 balls, including 18 runs in one over.

==== Handball ====
- World Men's Championship in Croatia:
  - Group B:
    - Croatia 27–26 South Korea

==== Rugby union ====
- Pool stage, week 5:
  (teams in **bold** advance to the quarterfinal)
  - Pool 1:
    - **Munster** (Ireland) 37–14 (England) Sale Sharks
      - Munster get the bonus-point win they need to clinch first place in the pool and advance to the quarterfinals.
    - Clermont (France) 43–10 (France) Montauban
  - Pool 2:
    - Edinburgh Rugby (Scotland) 32–14 (France) Castres

==== Tennis ====
- WTA Tour:
  - Medibank International Sydney in Sydney, Australia:
    - Final: (Russia) **Elena Dementieva** def. (Russia) **Dinara Safina** 6–3, 2–6, 6–1
      - Dementieva wins two tournaments back-to-back after winning the ASB Classic in Auckland last week.
  - Moorilla Hobart International in Hobart, Australia:
    - Final: (Czech Republic) **Petra Kvitová** def. (Czech Republic) **Iveta Benešová** 7–5, 6–1

==== Winter sports ====
===== Alpine skiing =====
- Men's World Cup in Wengen, Switzerland:
  - Super combined: (1) Carlo Janka (Switzerland) 2:34.16 (1:47.15 + 47.01) (2) Peter Fill (Italy) 2:34.38 (1:47.65 + 46.73) (3) Silvan Zurbriggen (Switzerland) 2:34.56 (1:48.16 + 46.40)
    - Overall World cup standings (after 18 events): (1) Benjamin Raich (Austria) 593 pts (2) Jean-Baptiste Grange (France) 536 (3) Aksel Lund Svindal (Norway) 502

===== Biathlon =====
- World Cup 5 in Ruhpolding, Germany:
  - Women's 7.5 km Sprint: (1) Magdalena Neuner (Germany) 23min 26.6sec (1), (2) Kati Wilhelm (Germany) at 0.2 (0), (3) Darya Domracheva (Belarus) 14.0 (0)
    - Overall World Cup standings (after 10 of 26 events): (1) Svetlana Sleptsova (Russia) 441 points, (2) Ekaterina Iourieva (Russia) 407, (3) Helena Jonsson (Sweden) 363

===== Bobsleigh =====
- World Cup 6 and European Championships at Sankt Moritz, Switzerland:
  - Two-woman: (1) Sandra Kiriasis/Berit Wiacker (Germany) 2:17.40 (1:09.20/1:08.20) (2) Cathleen Martini/Janine Tischer (Germany) 2:18.36 (1:09.73/1:08.63) (3) Nicole Minichiello/Gillian Cooke (United Kingdom) 2:18.75 (1:09.68/1:09.07)
    - World Cup standings (after 6 of 8 races): (1) Kiriasis 1295 points (2) Martini 1206 (3) Shauna Rohbock (United States) 1155

===== Cross-country skiing =====
- World Cup in Vancouver, British Columbia, Canada:
  - Men 1.6 km Classic Sprint: (1) Emil Joensson (Sweden) (2) Ola Vigen Hattestad (Norway) (3) Josef Wenzl (Germany)
  - Ladies 1.3 km Classic Sprint: (1) Alena Prochazkova (Slovakia) (2) Justyna Kowalczyk (Poland) (3) Anna Olsson (Sweden)

===== Nordic combined =====
- World Cup in Vancouver, British Columbia, Canada:
  - 10 km Gundersen: (1) Bill Demong (United States) 25:07.9 (2) Anssi Koivuranta (Finland) 25:26.3 (3) Bjoern Kircheisen (Germany) 25:40.2
    - World Cup standings (after 12 out of 24 races): (1) Koivuranta 723 points (2) Demong 615 (3) Magnus Moan (Norway) 601

===== Skeleton =====
- World Cup 6 and European Championships at Sankt Moritz, Switzerland:
  - Women: (1) Shelley Rudman (United Kingdom) 2:20.50 (1:10.53/1:09.97) (2) Mellisa Hollingsworth (Canada) 2:20.59 (1:10.43/1:10.16) (3) Michelle Kelly (Canada) 2:21.68 (1:10.95/1:10.73)
    - European Championship: (1) Rudman (2) Marion Trott (Germany) (4th overall) (3) Maya Pedersen (Switzerland) (7th)
    - World Cup standings (after 5 races): (1) Rudman 972 points (2) Anja Huber (Germany) 931 (3) Trott 912

===== Ski jumping =====
- World Cup in Zakopane, Poland:
  - 134m hill: (1) Wolfgang Loitzl (Austria) 272.7 points (129.5/132.0m), (2) Gregor Schlierenzauer (Austria) 262.5 (127.5/130.0), (3) Martin Schmitt (Germany) 249.4 (121.0/129.5)
    - Overall World Cup standings (after 14 of 28 rounds): (1) Simon Ammann (Switzerland) 1062pts, (2) Schlierenzauer 1020, (3) Loitzl 901

=== January 15, 2009 (Thursday) ===
==== Baseball ====
- Major League Baseball news:
  - MLB owners approve two rules changes:
    - All postseason games, as well as one-game playoffs, will be played to their conclusion. Games called due to weather will be suspended, regardless of the number of innings played.
    - Home-field advantage for one-game playoffs to break ties for division championships or wild-card berths will now be determined by head-to-head record, instead of a coin flip.

==== Basketball ====
- Euroleague, week 10:
  (teams in **bold** advance to the Top 16 stage)
  - Group A:
    - Air Avellino (Italy) 79–75 (Croatia) **Cibona Zagreb**
    - **Unicaja Málaga** (Spain) 92–69 (Israel) **Maccabi Tel Aviv**
      - Málaga's win secure them top spot in this group.
    - **Olympiacos** (Greece) 68–78 (France) Le Mans
  - Group C:
    - **TAU Cerámica** (Spain) 91–83 (Spain) DKV Joventut
    - **ALBA Berlin** (Germany) 59–67 (Slovenia) Union Olimpija Ljubljana
      - ALBA clinch the last spot in the Top 16 despite their loss because Joventut also lost.
    - **Fenerbahçe Ülker** (Turkey) 90–86(OT) (Italy) **Lottomatica Roma**

==== Winter sports ====
===== Biathlon =====
- World Cup 5 in Ruhpolding, Germany:
  - Men's 4 x 7.5 km Relay: (1) Norway 1hr 24min 54.0sec (0), (2) Germany at 1:20.2 (0), (3) Austria 1:43.1 (0)
    - World Cup relay standings (after four of six events): (1) Austria 222 points, (2) Russia 190, (3) Germany 182

===== Bobsleigh =====
- World Cup 4 at Sankt Moritz, Switzerland:
  - Two-man: (1) Pierre Lueders/David Bissett (Canada) 2:14.34 (1:07.55/1:06.79) (2) Ivo Rüegg/Roman Handschin (Switzerland) 2:14.64 (1:07.78/1:06.86) (3) Beat Hefti/Thomas Lamparter (Switzerland) 2:15.08 (1:08.03/1:07.05)
    - World Cup rankings (after 5 of 8 races): (1) Hefti 971 points (2) André Lange 931 (Germany) (3) Rüegg 860
  - Two-woman: (1) Sandra Kiriasis/Berit Wiacker (Germany) 2:17.34 (1:08.75/1:08.59) (2) Cathleen Martini/Janine Tischer (Germany) 2:17.36 (1:08.85/1:08.51) (3) Nicole Minichiello/Jackie Gunn (United Kingdom) 2:17.70 (1:08.75/1:08.95)
    - World Cup rankings (after 5 of 8 races): (1) Kiriasis 1070 points (2) Martini 996 (3) Shauna Rohbock (United States) 979
      - These races are substitutes for the cancelled races in Cesana Pariol in December.

=== January 14, 2009 (Wednesday) ===
==== American football ====
- College football news:
  - 2008 Heisman Trophy winner Sam Bradford announces that he will return for his junior (third) season at Oklahoma; as a third-year sophomore, he was eligible to declare for the 2009 NFL draft.

==== Basketball ====
- Euroleague, week 10:
  (teams in **bold** advance to the Top 16 stage)
  - Group B:
    - **Regal FC Barcelona** (Spain) 90–68 (Lithuania) Žalgiris Kaunas
    - SLUC Nancy (France) 79–103 (Italy) **Montepaschi Siena**
    - **Panathinaikos Athens** (Greece) 75–53 (Poland) **Asseco Prokom Sopot**
      - Sopot clinch the 4th berth in the Top 16 despite their loss as their rivals, Žalgiris and Nancy, lose as well.
  - Group D:
    - **CSKA Moscow** (Russia) 63–66 (Serbia) **Partizan Belgrade**
    - **Real Madrid** (Spain) 80–69 (Turkey) Efes Pilsen
    - Panionios (Greece) 77–87 (Italy) **AJ Milano**
      - Partizan Belgrade and Milano clinch berths in the Top 16 with their wins. Efes Pilsen's elimination ends a 12-years streak in the last-16 stage of Euroleague.

==== Cricket ====
- Tri-Series in Bangladesh:
  - 3rd match in Dhaka:
    - Sri Lanka 147 (30.3/31 ov); Bangladesh 151/5 (23.5/31 ov). Bangladesh win by 5 wickets, and advance to the final on Friday against Sri Lanka.

==== Football (soccer) ====
- Arabian Gulf Cup in Muscat, Oman:
  - Semifinals:
    - **Oman** 1–0 Qatar
    - Kuwait 0–1 **Saudi Arabia**
- News:
  - Israel police allows the Israeli Premier League match between Bnei Sakhnin F.C. and Hakoah Amidar Ramat Gan F.C. to be played at Sakhnin as scheduled on Saturday. It was earlier reported that due to fear of violence between home Arab fans and visiting Jewish supporters resulted from Israel-Gaza conflict the match would not be played at Sakhnin.

==== Winter sports ====
===== Biathlon =====
- World Cup 5 in Ruhpolding, Germany:
  - Women's 4 x 6 km Relay: (1) Germany 1hr 16min 41.2sec (0) (2) Russia at 37.5sec (0) (3) Sweden 56.5 (0)
    - World Cup relay standings (after 4 of 6 events): (1) Russia 234 points (2) Germany 205 (3) France 175

===== Freestyle skiing =====
- World Cup in Flaine, France:
  - Skicross men: (1) Tomas Kraus (Czech Republic) (2) Casey Puckett (United States) (3) Eric Iljans (Sweden)
  - Skicross women: (1) Ophelie David (France) (2) Ashleigh McIvor (Canada) (3) Karin Huttary (Austria)

===== Snowboarding =====
- World Cup in Gujō, Japan:
  - Halfpipe men: (1) Ryoh Aono (Japan) (2) Ben Mates (Australia) (3) Shi Wancheng (China)
  - Halfpipe women: (1) Liu Jiayu (China) (2) Sun Zhifeng (China) (3) Soko Yamaoka (Japan)

=== January 13, 2009 (Tuesday) ===
==== Cricket ====
- West Indies in New Zealand:
  - 5th ODI in Napier:
    - West Indies 293/9 (50 ov); New Zealand 211/5 (35/35 ov). New Zealand win by 9 runs (D/L method) and win the series 2–1.
- South Africa in Australia:
  - 2nd T20I in Brisbane
    - South Africa 157/5 (20/20 ov); Australia 161/4 (18.5/20 ov). Australia win by 6 wickets and win the series 2–0.

==== Football (soccer) ====
- CECAFA Cup in Kampala, Uganda:
  - Final:
    - Kenya 0–1 **Uganda**
      - Uganda wins the title for a record tenth time.
  - Bronze medal match:
    - **Tanzania** 3–2 Burundi
- News:
  - Israel Football Association decides to resume play in the top three divisions this weekend for the first time since the start of Israel-Gaza conflict. Lower divisions will still be suspended. Teams whose home grounds are within 40 km of the Gaza Strip will have to play their matches on alternative grounds out of the danger zone. Also, matches between teams from Jewish and Arab towns may be played on neutral grounds by police order for fear of possible crowd violence. Officials of teams that could be affected by this decision, in particular Hapoel Be'er Sheva F.C. and Bnei Sakhnin F.C., say they object to move away from their home grounds.

=== January 12, 2009 (Monday) ===
==== American football ====
- NFL News:
  - Tony Dungy retires from football as head coach of the Indianapolis Colts. Jim Caldwell, who was named head coach designate in January 2008, takes over Dungy's responsibilities.
  - Josh McDaniels, offensive coordinator of the New England Patriots, is named the new head coach of the Denver Broncos.

==== Baseball ====
- Jim Rice and Rickey Henderson are elected to the Hall of Fame by the BBWAA. Henderson enters in his first year of eligibility while Rice enters in his 15th and final year of eligibility, the third player to do so.

==== Cricket ====
- Tri-Series in Bangladesh:
  - 2nd match in Dhaka:
    - Sri Lanka 210/6 (50 ov); Zimbabwe 80 (28.2 ov). Sri Lanka win by 130 runs.

==== Football (soccer) ====
- 2008 FIFA World Player of the Year awards in Zürich, Switzerland:
  - Men: (1) (Portugal) Cristiano Ronaldo (Manchester United) (2) (Argentina) Lionel Messi (Barçelona) (3) (Spain) Fernando Torres (Liverpool)
  - Women: (1) (Brazil) Marta (Umeå) (2) (Germany) Birgit Prinz (Frankfurt) (3) (Brazil) Cristiane (Corinthians)

=== January 11, 2009 (Sunday) ===
==== American football ====
- NFL Playoffs, Divisional Playoff Round:
  (Conference rankings in parentheses)
  - NFC: (6) Philadelphia Eagles 23, (1) New York Giants 11
    - The Eagles victory means the reigning Super Bowl champion will not defend its title for the fourth year in a row. Philadelphia will play at Glendale, Arizona in the NFC Championship Game next Sunday against the Arizona Cardinals.
  - AFC: (2) Pittsburgh Steelers 35, (4) San Diego Chargers 24.
    - Willie Parker runs for 146 yards and two touchdowns to lead the Steelers to the win and the right to host their divisional rivals, the Baltimore Ravens, in the AFC Championship Game next week.
- College football news:
  - Tim Tebow announces he will return for his senior season at Florida.

==== Badminton ====
- BWF Super Series:
  - Malaysia Super Series in Kuala Lumpur:
    (seeding in parentheses)
    - Men's Singles: Lee Chong Wei (Malaysia) (1) bt Park Sung-hwan (South Korea) (5) 21–14, 21–13
    - Women's Singles: Tine Rasmussen (Denmark) (2) bt Zhou Mi (Hong Kong) (1) 21–17, 15–21, 21–16
    - Mixed Doubles: Nova Widianto/Liliyana Natsir (Indonesia) (1) bt Lee Yong-dae/Lee Hyo-jung (South Korea) (2) 21–14, 21–19
    - Women's Doubles: Lee Hyo-jung/Lee Kyung-won (South Korea) (4) bt Yang Wei/Zhang Jiewen (China) (5) 21–15, 21–12
    - Men's Doubles: Jung Jae-sung/Lee Yong-dae (South Korea) (2) bt Hendra Aprida Gunawan/Alvent Yulianto (Indonesia) 18–21, 21–14, 21–14

==== Cricket ====
- South Africa in Australia:
  - 1st T20I in Melbourne:
    - Australia 182/9 (20/20 ov); South Africa 130 (18/20 ov). Australia win by 52 runs, and lead 1–0 in 2-match series.

==== Darts ====
- BDO World Championship in Frimley Green, United Kingdom:
  - Men's Final: (England) Ted Hankey def. (England) Tony O'Shea 7–6
    - The Count wins his second World Championship title.

==== Football (soccer) ====
- CECAFA Cup in Kampala, Uganda:
  - Semifinals:
    - **Kenya** 2–1 Tanzania
    - **Uganda** 5–0 Burundi

==== Golf ====
- PGA Tour:
  - Mercedes-Benz Championship in Kapalua, Hawaii:
    - Winner: (Australia) Geoff Ogilvy 268 (−24)
- European Tour:
  - Joburg Open in Johannesburg, South Africa:
    - Winner: (Denmark) Anders Hansen 269 (−15)

==== Tennis ====
- ATP Tour:
  - Brisbane International in Brisbane, Australia:
    - Final: (Czech Republic) **Radek Štěpánek** def. (Spain) Fernando Verdasco 3–6 6–3 6–4
  - Chennai Open in Chennai, India:
    - Final: (Croatia) **Marin Čilić** def. (India) Somdev Devvarman 6–4, 7–6 (7/3)

==== Winter sports ====
===== Alpine skiing =====
- Men's World Cup in Adelboden, Switzerland:
  - Slalom: (1) Reinfried Herbst (Austria) 1:42.95 (50.12 + 52.83) (2) Manfred Pranger (Austria) 1:43.13 (49.14 + 53.99) (3) Felix Neureuther (Germany) 1:43.27 (50.37 + 52.90)
    - Overall World Cup standings (after 17 events): (1) Benjamin Raich (Austria) 557 pts (2) Jean-Baptiste Grange (France) 507 (3) Aksel Lund Svindal (Norway) 470
- Women's World Cup in Maribor, Slovenia:
  - Slalom: (1) Maria Riesch (Germany) 1:29.64 (44.78 + 44.86) (2) Kathrin Zettel (Austria) 1:30.79 (46.07 + 44.72) (3) Tanja Poutiainen (Finland) 1:31.41 (46.08 + 45.33)
    - Overall World Cup standings (after 15 of 35 events): (1) Riesch 729 points (2) Poutiainen 644 (3) Lindsey Vonn (United States) 616

===== Biathlon =====
- World Cup 4 in Oberhof, Germany:
  - 12.5 km Mass Start Women: (1) Kati Wilhelm (Germany) 38min 11.6sec (2 penalties) (2) Olga Medvedtseva (Russia) at 1.6sec (2) (3) Helena Jonsson (Sweden) 11.1 (1)
    - Overall World Cup standings (after nine events): (1) Svetlana Sleptsova (Russia) 401 points (2) Ekaterina Iourieva (Russia) 371 (3) Jonsson 331
  - 15 km Mass Start Men: (1) Christoph Sumann (Austria) 38:11.9 (1+0+1+0) (2) Carl Johan Bergman (Sweden) 38:21.6 (0+0+1+1) (3) Ole Einar Bjørndalen (Norway) 38:21.8 (0+1+1+0)

===== Bobsleigh =====
- World Cup 5 in Königssee, Germany:
  - Four-man: (1) Germany (Karl Angerer, Andreas Udvari, Alex Mann, Gregor Bermbach) 1:37.84 (48.96/48.88) (2) Netherlands (Edwin van Calker, Arnold van Calker, Arno Klaassen, Sybren Jansma) 1:37.93 (48.91/49.02) (3) Germany (André Lange, Rene Hoppe, Alexander Rödiger, Martin Putze) 1:37.94 (48.78/49.16) & Latvia (Jānis Miņins, Daumants Dreiškens, Oskars Melbardis, Intars Dambis) 1:37.94 (48.83/49.11)
    - World Cup standings (after 4 of 8 events): (1) Alexandre Zoubkov (Russia) 821 (2) Lange 803 (3) Minins 760

===== Curling =====
- Ramada Perth Masters in Perth Scotland:
  - Men's final: (Canada) Kevin Koe 6–5 (Norway) Thomas Ulsrud
- Bernese Ladies Cup in Bern, Switzerland:
  - Women's final: (Canada) Shannon Kleibrink 6–5 (Germany) Andrea Schöpp
- Casino Rama Skins in Rama, Ontario
  - (Canada) Randy Ferbey def. (Canada) Glenn Howard

===== Freestyle skiing =====
- World Cup in Les Contamines, France:
  - Half-pipe men: (1) Xavier Bertoni (France) 44.60 (2) Nils Lauper (Switzerland) 42.00 (3) Kevin Rolland (France) 41.90
  - Half-pipe women: (1) Virginie Faivre (Switzerland) 41.2 (2) Miyuki Hatanaka (Japan) 36.8 (3) Jessica Reedy (United States) 33.6

===== Luge =====
- World Cup 5 in Cesana Pariol, Italy:
  - Men: (1) Armin Zöggeler (Italy) (2) Felix Loch (Germany) (3) Daniel Pfister (Austria)
    - World Cup standings (after 5 of 9 races): (1) Zöggeler 455 (2) David Möller (Germany) 385 (3) Jan Eichhorn (Germany) 275

===== Nordic combined =====
- World Cup in Val di Fiemme, Italy:
  - 10 km Gundersen: (1) Magnus Moan (Norway) 27:33.1 (13th after ski jump) (2) Jan Schmid (Norway) 27:37.2 (7) (3) Pavel Churavy (Czech Republic) 27:37.5 (8)
    - Overall World Cup standings (after 11 out of 24 races): (1) Anssi Koivuranta (Finland) 643 points (2) Moan 556 (3) Bill Demong (United States) 515

===== Ski jumping =====
- World Cup in Tauplitz/Bad Mitterndorf, Austria:
  - 200m flying hill: (1) Gregor Schlierenzauer (Austria) 393.6 points (203.5/202.0m) (2) Harri Olli (Finland) 390.4 (201.5/200.5) (3) Simon Ammann (Switzerland) 382.2 (197.5/198.5)
    - Overall World Cup standings (after 13 of 28 events): (1) Ammann 1017 points (2) Schlierenzauer 940 (3) Wolfgang Loitzl (Austria) 801

===== Snowboarding =====
- World Cup in Bad Gastein, Austria:
  - Snowboardcross men: (1) Damon Hayler (Australia) (2) Markus Schairer (Austria) (3) Mike Robertson (Canada)
  - Snowboardcross women: (1) Lindsey Jacobellis (United States) (2) Dominique Maltais (Canada) (3) Zoe Gillings (United Kingdom)

===== Speed skating =====
- European Championships in Heerenveen, Netherlands:
  - Men overall standings: (1) Sven Kramer (Netherlands) 148.564 points (2) Håvard Bøkko (Norway) 150.495 (3) Wouter olde Heuvel (Netherlands) 150.629
  - Women overall standings: (1) Claudia Pechstein (Germany) 162.014 points (2) Daniela Anschütz-Thoms (Germany) 162.307 (3) Martina Sáblíková (Czech Republic) 162.815

=== January 10, 2009 (Saturday) ===
==== American football ====
- NFL Playoffs, Divisional Playoff Round (conference rankings in parentheses):
  - AFC: (6) Baltimore Ravens 13, (1) Tennessee Titans 10
    - Matt Stover's 43-yard field goal with 53 seconds left provides the winning margin, and Joe Flacco becomes the first rookie quarterback in NFL history to win two playoff games. The Ravens will travel to either San Diego or Pittsburgh for next week's AFC title game.
  - NFC: (4) Arizona Cardinals 33, (2) Carolina Panthers 13
    - Jake Delhomme throws five interceptions and loses a fumble, leading to 23 of Arizona's points. The Cardinals will play either Philadelphia Eagles or New York Giants in the NFC Championship Game.

==== Cricket ====
- West Indies in New Zealand:
  - 4th ODI in Auckland:
    - New Zealand 275/4 (50 ov); West Indies 64/0 (10.3/40 ov). No result. 5-match series level 1–1.
- Tri-Series in Bangladesh:
  - 1st match in Dhaka:
    - Zimbabwe 205/9 (50 ov); Bangladesh 167 (46.2 ov). Zimbabwe win by 38 runs.

==== Ice hockey ====
- World Women's U18 Championship in Füssen, Germany:
  - Final:
    - **United States** 3–2(OT) Canada
      - Kendal Coyne's eighth goal of the tournament in overtime gives USA their second title in as many women junior world championships.
  - Bronze medal game:
    - **Sweden** 9–1 Czech Republic
  - Game for 5th place:
    - Germany 1–2 **Finland**
  - Game for 7th place:
    - Switzerland 2–3(SO) **Russia**
      - Switzerland is relegated to Division I in 2010, and will be replaced in the top division by Japan.

==== Tennis ====
- ATP Tour:
  - Qatar ExxonMobil Open in Doha, Qatar:
    - Final: (United Kingdom) **Andy Murray** def. (United States) Andy Roddick 6–4, 6–2
- WTA Tour:
  - Brisbane International in Brisbane, Australia:
    - Final: (Belarus) **Victoria Azarenka** def. (France) Marion Bartoli 6–3, 6–1
  - ASB Classic in Auckland, New Zealand:
    - Final: (Russia) **Elena Dementieva** def. (Russia) Elena Vesnina 6–4 6–1
- JB Group Classic in Hong Kong:
  - Gold group final (best of five matches):
    - Gisela Dulko (Argentina) (Americas) def. Anna Chakvetadze (Russia) 3–6, 6–4, 6–4
    - Venus Williams (United States) (Americas) def. Vera Zvonareva (Russia) 6–2, 6–2
    - Venus Williams/Coco Vandeweghe (United States) (Americas) def. Anna Chakvetadze/Alexandra Panova (Russia) 6–4, 6–1
      - Americas beat Russia 4–1
  - Silver group final (best of three matches):
    - Zheng Jie (China) (Asia-Pacific) def. Michelle Larcher de Brito (Portugal) (Europe) 6–1, 6–1
      - Asia-Pacific beat Europe 3–0

==== Winter sports ====
===== Alpine skiing =====
- Men's World Cup in Adelboden, Switzerland:
  - Giant slalom: (1) Benjamin Raich (Austria) 2:24.95 (1:12.33 + 1:12.62) (2) Massimiliano Blardone (Italy) 2:25.19 (1:12.53 + 1:12.66) (3) Kjetil Jansrud (Norway) 2:25.67 (1:14.19 + 1:11.48)
    - Overall World Cup standings (after 16 events): (1) Raich 533 points (2) Jean-Baptiste Grange (France) 478 (3) Aksel Lund Svindal (Norway) 470
- Women's World Cup in Maribor, Slovenia:
  - Giant slalom: (1) Tina Maze (Slovenia) 2:45.15 (1:21.75 + 1:23.40) (2) Denise Karbon (Italy) 2:45.54 (1:21.66 + 1:23.88) (3) Kathrin Hoelzl (Germany) 2:46.07 (1:21.93 + 1:24.14)
    - Overall World Cup standings (after 14 of 35 events): (1) Maria Riesch (Germany) 629 points (2) Tanja Poutiainen (Finland) 584 (3) Lindsey Vonn (United States) 566

===== Biathlon =====
- World Cup 4 in Oberhof, Germany:
  - 10 km Sprint Men: (1) Maxim Tchoudov (Russia) 25:49.5 (0+0) (2) Michael Roesch (Germany) 26:02.2 (0+0) (3) Tomasz Sikora (Poland) 26:14.7 (1+0)

===== Bobsleigh =====
- World Cup 5 in Königssee, Germany:
  - Two-man: Thomas Florschuetz/Marc Kühne (Germany) 1:44.62 (52.20/52.42) (2) Ivo Rüegg/Cedric Grand (Switzerland) 1:39.27 (49.54/49.73) (3) Alexandre Zoubkov/Dmitry Trunenkov (Russia) 1:39.31 (49.58/49.73) & Karl Angerer/Alex Mann (Germany) 1:39.31 (49.73/49.58)
    - World Cup standings (after 4 of 8 races): (1) André Lange (Germany) 795 points (2) Beat Hefti (Switzerland) 771 (3) Zoubkov & Todd Hays (United States) 672
  - Two-woman: (1) Shauna Rohbock/Valerie Fleming (United States) 1:41.91 (50.78/51.13) (2) Nicole Minichiello/Gillian Cooke (United Kingdom) 1:42.05 (50.87/51.18) & Sandra Kiriasis/Romy Logsch (Germany) 1:42.05 (51.02/51.03)
    - World Cup standings (after 4 of 8 races): (1) Kiriasis 845 points (2) Rohbock 803 (3) Helen Upperton (Canada) 794

===== Freestyle skiing =====
- World Cup in Les Contamines, France:
  - Skicross men: (1) Andreas Matt (Austria) (2) Christopher Delbosco (Canada) (3) Markus Wittner (Austria)
  - Skicross women: (1) Hedda Berntsen (Norway) (2) Ophelie David (France) (3) Katrin Ofner (Austria)

===== Luge =====
- World Cup 5 in Cesana Pariol, Italy:
  - Women: (1) Tatjana Hüfner (Germany) (2) Natalie Geisenberger (Germany) (3) Nina Reithmayer (Austria)
    - World Cup standings (after 5 of 9 races): (1) Hüfner 485 points (2) Geisenberger 415 (3) Anke Wischnewski (Germany) 322
  - Doubles: (1) Christian Oberstolz/Patrick Gruber (Italy) (2) Gerhard Plankensteiner/Oswald Haselrieder (Italy) (3) Andris Sics/Juris Sics (Latvia)
    - World Cup standings (after 5 of 9 races): (1) Oberstolz/Gruber 420 points (2) Andreas Linger/Wolfgang Linger (Austria) 350 (3) Plankensteiner/Haselrieder 319

===== Nordic combined =====
- World Cup in Val di Fiemme, Italy:
  - 10 km mass start: (1) Bjoern Kircheisen (Germany) (2) Bernhard Gruber (Austria) (3) Jan Schmid (Norway)
    - Overall World Cup standings (after 10 of 24 events): (1) Anssi Koivuranta (Finland) 643 points (2) Kircheisen 509 (3) Bill Demong (United States) 497

===== Ski jumping =====
- World Cup in Tauplitz/Bad Mitterndorf, Austria:
  - 200m flying hill: (1) Gregor Schlierenzauer (Austria) 398.0 points (199.5/215.5m (hill record)) (2) Simon Ammann (Switzerland) 390.1 (207.5/195.5) (3) Martin Koch (Austria) 386.8 (197.5/209.0)
    - World Cup overall standings (after 12 of 28 events): (1) Ammann 957 points (2) Schlierenzauer 840 (3) Wolfgang Loitzl (Austria) 775

===== Snowboarding =====
- World Cup in Bad Gastein, Austria:
  - Snowboardcross men: (1) Xavier de Le Rue (France) (2) Michal Novotny (Czech Republic) (3) Nate Holland (United States)
  - Snowboardcross women: (1) Sandra Frei (Switzerland) (2) Déborah Anthonioz (France) Lindsey Jacobellis (United States)

=== January 9, 2009 (Friday) ===
==== Darts ====
- BDO World Championship in Frimley Green, United Kingdom:
  - Women's final: (Netherlands) Francis Hoenselaar beat (England) Trina Gulliver 2–1
    - Hoenselaar wins her first World Championship title after losing in five previous finals to 7-times champion Gulliver.

==== Ice hockey ====
- World Women's U18 Championship in Füssen, Germany:
  - Semifinals:
    - **Canada** 6–1 Sweden
    - **United States** 18–0 Czech Republic
      - In a repeat of last year's championships, Canada and United States will play in the final, while Sweden and Czech Republic play for bronze medals.
  - Classification 5–8:
    - Switzerland 1–2(SO) **Germany**
    - Russia 1–2(OT) **Finland**

==== Tennis ====
- Hopman Cup in Perth, Australia:
  - Final:
    - **Slovakia** 2–0 Russia (doubles match not played)
      - Dominika Cibulková and Dominik Hrbatý give Slovakia its third Hopman Cup title.
- JB Group Classic in Hong Kong:
  - Gold group final (best of five matches):
    - Venus Williams (United States) (Americas) bt Anna Chakvetadze (Russia) 7–6 (7/1), 6–3
    - Vera Zvonareva (Russia) bt Gisela Dulko (Argentina) (Americas) 6–4, 0–6, 6–3
      - Americas and Russia level 1–1.
  - Silver group final (best of three matches):
    - Sania Mirza (India) (Asia-Pacific) bt Ágnes Szávay (Hungary) (Europe) 6–3, 6–4
    - Zheng Jie (China) /Sania Mirza (India) (Asia-Pacific) bt Jelena Janković (Serbia) /Michelle Larcher de Brito (Portugal) (Europe) 6–1, 6–1
      - Asia-Pacific win the silver group final 2–0.

==== Winter sports ====
===== Biathlon =====
- World Cup 4 in Oberhof, Germany:
  - 7.5 km Sprint Women: (1) Ekaterina Iourieva (Russia) 22:09.7 (1 penalty), (2) Andrea Henkel (Germany) at 2.4 (O), (3) Helena Jonsson (Sweden) 19.6 (0)
    - Overall World Cup standings (after eight rounds): (1) Svetlana Sleptsova (Russia) 361 points, (2) Iourieva 337, (3) Jonsson 283

===== Skeleton =====
- World Cup 5 in Königssee, Germany:
  - Men: (1) Frank Rommel (Germany) 1:34.91 (47.44/47.47) (2) Florian Grassl (Germany) 1:35.91 (47.85/48.06) (3) Aleksandr Tretyakov (Russia) 1:36.03 (48.20/47.83)
    - World Cup standings (after four races): (1) Grassl 803 points (2) Martins Dukurs (Latvia) 802 (3) Tretyakov 772
  - Women: (1) Anja Huber (Germany) 1:38.85 (49.55/49.30) (2) Shelley Rudman (United Kingdom) 1:39.09 (49.84/49.25) (3) Marion Trott (Germany) 1:39.20 (49.65/49.55)
    - World Cup standings (after four races): (1) Huber 811 points (2) Rudman 747 (3) Amy Williams (United Kingdom) 736

=== January 8, 2009 (Thursday) ===
==== American football ====
- NCAA Bowl Games:
  - BCS National Championship Game at Miami Gardens, Florida:
    - (2) Florida 24, (1) Oklahoma 14
      - The Gators win their second BCS national title in three seasons as 2007 Heisman Trophy winner Tim Tebow outduels 2008 winner Sam Bradford.

==== Basketball ====
- Euroleague, week 9:
  (teams in **bold** advance to the Top 16 stage; teams in italics are eliminated)
  - Group A:
    - **Cibona Zagreb** (Croatia) 76–77 (Spain) **Unicaja Málaga**
    - **Maccabi Tel Aviv** (Israel) 96–83 (Greece) **Olympiacos**
      - Following these results, Málaga move to the top of the group, ahead of Olympiacos and Maccabi.
  - Group B:
    - **Montepaschi Siena** (Italy) 82–77 (Greece) **Panathinaikos Athens**
    - Žalgiris Kaunas (Lithuania) 105–94 (France) SLUC Nancy
      - Žalgiris draw level with Nancy and Sopot for the 4th and final Top 16 place in the group, and hold tie-break advantage against each one of them, but Sopot would have the edge in case of a 3-way tie.
  - Group C:
    - Union Olimpija Ljubljana (Slovenia) 70–90 (Turkey) **Fenerbahçe Ülker**
      - Fenerbahçe punch their ticket to the Top 16.
    - **Lottomatica Roma** (Italy) 96–103(OT) (Spain) **TAU Cerámica**
      - TAU get the four-point win they needed to secure top spot in the group.
  - Group D:
    - AJ Milano (Italy) 70–61 (Spain) **Real Madrid**
      - Real's loss assures **CSKA Moscow** of first place in the group. Milano gets level with Partizan Belgrade and Efes Pilsen in 3rd to 5th places, but because of disadvantage in tiebreakers can only advance to the Top 16 if results in other group matches on the final day go their way.

==== Tennis ====
- Hopman Cup in Perth, Australia:
  (teams in **bold** advance to the final)
  - Group A:
    - United States 2–1 Australia
    - **Slovakia** 3–0 Germany
  - Group B:
    - **Russia** 2–1 France
    - Italy 3–0 Chinese Taipei

==== Winter sports ====
===== Biathlon =====
- World Cup 4 in Oberhof, Germany:
  - 4 x 7.5 km Relay Men: (1) Austria 1hr 19min 36.61sec (0 penalties), (2) Russia 8.7sec behind (0), (3) Germany 19.2 (1)
    - World Cup relay standings: (1) Austria 174 (2) Russia 154 (3) Sweden 124

=== January 7, 2009 (Wednesday) ===
==== Basketball ====
- Euroleague, week 9:
  (teams in **bold** advance to the Top 16 stage; teams in italics are eliminated)
  - Group A:
    - Le Mans (France) 92–88 (Italy) Air Avellino
      - Le Mans score their first win, but it's too late...
  - Group B:
    - Asseco Prokom Sopot (Poland) 64–76 (Spain) **Regal FC Barcelona**
      - Barcelona secure top place in the group which put them in the top seeding group for the draw of the Top 16 stage.
  - Group C:
    - DKV Joventut (Spain) 75–79 (Germany) ALBA Berlin
      - ALBA get level with Joventut in 4th place, and take the tie-break advantage against them.
  - Group D:
    - Efes Pilsen (Turkey) 55–74 (Russia) **CSKA Moscow**
      - CSKA's win effectively secure them top place in the group, and also assures Real Madrid advance to the Top 16.
    - Partizan Belgrade (Serbia) 80–57 (Greece) Panionios
      - Partizan draw level with Efes Pilsen in 3rd place. Panionios drop to last place and has only a slim chance of qualifying.

==== Cricket ====
- South Africa in Australia:
  - 3rd Test in Sydney, day 5:
    - Australia 445 and 257/4d; South Africa 327 and 272. Australia win by 103 runs, South Africa win the series 2–1.
- West Indies in New Zealand:
  - 3rd ODI in Wellington:
    - West Indies 128 (41.4 ov); New Zealand 129/3 (20.3 ov). New Zealand win by 7 wickets and level the 5-match series 1–1.
- News:
  - In a tumultuous day for the England cricket team, Kevin Pietersen steps down as captain and Peter Moores is sacked as head coach. Andrew Strauss will take over as captain for the upcoming tour of the West Indies.

==== Ice hockey ====
- Champions Hockey League Semifinals, second leg:
  (First leg scores in parentheses)
  - Salavat Yulaev Ufa (Russia) 1(2)–4(1) (Russia) **Metallurg Magnitogorsk**
    - Metallurg win in penalty shootout.
  - Espoo Blues (Finland) 1(3)–4(6) (Switzerland) **ZSC Lions**
    - Lions win 10–4 on aggregate.
- World Women's U18 Championship in Füssen, Germany:
  (teams in **bold** advance to the semifinals)
  - Group B:
    - Switzerland 4–3 Finland
    - **Canada** 13–0 **Czech Republic**
  - Group A:
    - **United States** 9–2 **Sweden**
    - Russia 5–2 Germany

==== Tennis ====
- Hopman Cup in Perth, Australia:
  - Group A:
    - United States 1–2 Germany
  - Group B:
    - Russia 2–1 Chinese Taipei

==== Winter sports ====
===== Biathlon =====
- World Cup 4 in Oberhof, Germany:
  - 4 x 6 km Relay Women: (1) Russia (Svetlana Sleptsova, Olga Zaitseva, Ekaterina Iourieva, Olga Medvedtseva) 1hr 16min 47.7sec (1 penalty), (2) Ukraine at 1:10.2 (0), (3) Germany 1:31.4 (2)
    - World Cup relay standings (after 3 of 6 events): (1) Russia 180 points, (2) Germany 145, (3) France 139

===== Snowboarding =====
- World Cup in Kreischberg, Austria:
  - Parallel slalom men: (1) Simon Schoch (Switzerland) (2) Rok Flander (Slovenia) (3) Zan Kosir (Slovenia)
  - Parallel slalom women: (1) Amelie Kober (Germany) (2) Tomoka Takeuchi (Japan) (3) Heidi Neururer (Austria)

=== January 6, 2009 (Tuesday) ===
==== American football ====
- NCAA Bowl Games:
  - GMAC Bowl: Tulsa 45, (22) Ball State 13

==== Cricket ====
- South Africa in Australia:
  - 3rd Test in Sydney, day 4:
    - Australia 445 and 257/4d (Simon Katich 61); South Africa 327 and 62/1. South Africa require another 314 runs with 9 wickets remaining.
- Sri Lanka in Bangladesh:
  - 2nd Test in Chittagong, day 4
    - Sri Lanka 384 and 447/6d (Tillakaratne Dilshan 143); Bangladesh 208 and 158. Sri Lanka win by 465 runs and win the series 2–0.

==== Ice hockey ====
- World Women's U18 Championship in Füssen, Germany:
  (teams in **bold** advance to the semifinals)
  - Group B:
    - Czech Republic 7–3 Switzerland
    - Finland 0–6 **Canada**
  - Group A:
    - **Sweden** 6–1 Russia
    - Germany 0–11 **United States**

==== Tennis ====
- Hopman Cup in Perth, Australia:
  - Group B:
    - France 1–2 Italy
  - Group A:
    - Australia 1–2 Slovakia

==== Winter sports ====
===== Alpine skiing =====
- Men's World Cup in Zagreb, Croatia:
  - Slalom: (1) Jean-Baptiste Grange (France) 1:53.31 (53.91 + 59.40) (2) Ivica Kostelic (Croatia) 1:53.36 (54.18 + 59.18) (3) Giuliano Razzoli (Italy) 1:53.66 (54.88 + 58.78)
    - Overall World Cup standings (after 15 races): (1) Grange 466pts, (2) Aksel Lund Svindal (Norway) 444, (3) Benjamin Raich (Austria) 433

===== Ski jumping =====
- Four Hills Tournament:
  - World Cup in Bischofshofen, Austria:
    - Individual 140m hill: (1) Wolfgang Loitzl (Austria) 301.2 points (142.5/141.5m) (2) Simon Ammann (Switzerland) 284.4 (137.5/140.5) (3) Dimitry Vassiliev (Russia) 279.2 (138.0/138.5)
      - Final Four Hills standings: (1) Loitzl 1123.7 points (2) Ammann 1091.1 (3) Gregor Schlierenzauer (Austria) 1077.1
      - Overall World Cup standings (after 11 of 28 events): (1) Ammann 877 points (2) Schlierenzauer 740 (3) Loitzl 739

===== Snowboarding =====
- World Cup in Kreischberg, Austria:
  - Parallel GS men: (1) Siegfried Grabner (Austria) (2) Simon Schoch (Switzerland) (3)Meinhard Erlacher (Italy)
  - Parallel GS women: (1) Doris Guenther (Austria) (2) Tomoka Takeuchi (Japan) (3) Claudia Riegler (Austria)

=== January 5, 2009 (Monday) ===
==== American football ====
- NCAA Bowl Games:
  - Bowl Championship Series
    - Fiesta Bowl: (3) Texas 24, (10) Ohio State 21.
      - Colt McCoy's 26-yard pass to Quan Cosby with 16 seconds left wins the game for the Longhorns.

==== Baseball ====
- Philadelphia Phillies reliever JC Romero and Sergio Mitre of the New York Yankees are both suspended for the first 50 games of the 2009 season after violating substance policy rules.
- Carl Pohlad, owner of the Minnesota Twins, dies at the age of 93 in Minneapolis.

==== Cricket ====
- South Africa in Australia:
  - 3rd Test in Sydney, day 3:
    - Australia 445 and 33/0; South Africa 327 (Mark Boucher 89). Australia lead by 151 runs with 10 wickets remaining.
- Sri Lanka in Bangladesh:
  - 2nd Test in Chittagong, day 3:
    - Sri Lanka 384 and 296/4 (Tillakaratne Dilshan 81*); Bangladesh 208. Sri Lanka lead by 472 runs with 6 wickets remaining.

==== Ice hockey ====
- World Junior Championships in Ottawa, Ontario, Canada
  - Gold Medal Game:
    - Sweden 1–5 **Canada**
      - Canada wins its fifth consecutive gold medal, matching their own record set from 1993–1997.
  - Bronze Medal Game:
    - Slovakia 2–5 **Russia**
- World Women's U18 Championship in Füssen, Germany:
  - Group B:
    - Czech Republic 1–2(SO) **Finland**
    - **Canada** 16–1 Switzerland
  - Group A:
    - **United States** 17–0 Russia
    - **Sweden** 8–1 Germany

==== Tennis ====
- Hopman Cup in Perth, Australia:
  - Group A:
    - Australia 1–2 Germany
    - United States 0–3 Slovakia

==== Winter sports ====
===== Freestyle skiing =====
- World Cup in St. Johann in Tirol, Austria:
  - Skicross men: (1) Michael Schmid (Switzerland) (2) Andreas Matt (Austria) (3) Tommy Eliasson (Sweden)
  - Skicross women: (1) Marion Josserand (France) (2) Katharina Gutensohn (Austria) (3) Kelsey Serwa (Canada)

=== January 4, 2009 (Sunday) ===
==== American football ====
- NFL Playoffs Wild card round:
  (Seedings in parentheses)
  - AFC: (6) Baltimore Ravens 27, (3) Miami Dolphins 9
    - Ed Reed's 64-yard interception return for a touchdown was the turning point for Baltimore.
  - NFC: (6) Philadelphia Eagles 26, (3) Minnesota Vikings 14
    - Donovan McNabb's 79-yard touchdown pass to Brian Westbrook was the difference as the Eagles beat the NFC North champions.
  - Next week's Divisional Round will be rematches of regular season games with the Arizona Cardinals visiting the Carolina Panthers and the Eagles visiting the New York Giants in the NFC, while the Ravens visit the Tennessee Titans and the San Diego Chargers making a trip to the Pittsburgh Steelers in the AFC.

==== Cricket ====
- South Africa in Australia:
  - 3rd Test in Sydney, day 2:
    - Australia 445 (Michael Clarke 138), South Africa 125/1. South Africa trail by 320 runs with 9 wickets remaining in the 1st innings.
- Sri Lanka in Bangladesh:
  - 2nd Test in Chittagong, day 2:
    - Sri Lanka 384 (Tillakaratne Dilshan 162) and 13/0; Bangladesh 208 (Mashrafe Mortaza 63). Sri Lanka lead by 189 runs with 10 wickets remaining.

==== Darts ====
- PDC World Darts Championship in London, United Kingdom:
  - Final:
    - **(England) Phil Taylor** def. (Netherlands) Raymond van Barneveld 7–1

==== Ice hockey ====
- World Junior Championships in Ottawa, Ontario, Canada
  - Relegation Round (at the Ottawa Civic Centre):
    - Germany 1–3 **Finland**
    - Kazakhstan 1–7 **Latvia**
      - Germany and Kazakhstan are relegated to Division 1 in 2010.
  - 5th place Playoff (at Scotiabank Place):
    - United States 3–2(OT) Czech Republic

==== Tennis ====
- Hopman Cup in Perth, Australia:
  - Group B:
    - Russia 2–1 Italy

==== Winter sports ====
===== Alpine skiing =====
- Women's World Cup in Zagreb, Croatia:
  - Slalom: (1) Maria Riesch (Germany) 1min 58.96sec (58.60 + 1:00.36) (2) Nicole Gius (Italy) 1:59.40 (1:00.15 + 59.25) (3) Šárka Záhrobská (Czech Republic) 1:59.59 (59.79 + 59.80)
    - Overall standings (after 13 of 35 races): (1) Riesch 607pts, (2) Tanja Poutiainen (Finland) 534, (3) Lindsey Vonn (United States) 530

===== Cross-country skiing =====
- Tour de Ski stage 7 in Val di Fiemme, Italy:
  - Men Final standings: (1) Dario Cologna (Switzerland) 2hr 46min 05.4sec, (2) Petter Northug (Norway) at 59.0sec, (3) Axel Teichmann (Germany) 1min 02.8sec
    - Overall World Cup standings (after 15 of 33 races): (1) Cologna 835 points, (2) Teichmann 661, (3) Northug 618
  - Women Final standings: (1) Virpi Kuitunen (Finland) 2hr 06min 41.4sec, (2) Aino-Kaisa Saarinen (Finland) at 7.2sec, (3) Petra Majdič (Slovenia) 34.5
    - Overall World Cup standings (after 14 of 33 races): (1) Saarinen 978 points, (2) Kuitunen 907, (3) Majdic 893

===== Luge =====
- World Cup 4 in Königssee, Germany:
  - Men: (1) Armin Zöggeler (Italy) (2) David Möller (Germany) (3) Felix Loch (Germany)
    - Overall standings (after 4 of 9 races): (1) Zöggeler 355 (2) Möller 325 (3) Andi Langenhan (Germany) 227

===== Nordic combined =====
- World Cup in Schonach, Germany:
  - 10 km Gundersen: (1) Anssi Koivuranta (Finland) 22min 15.4sec (1) (2) Bill Demong (United States) at 6.7 (18) (3) Bjorn Kircheisen (Germany) 7.1 (19)
    - Overall standings (after 9 of 24 races): (1) Koivuranta 643 points (2) Demong 447 (3) Magnus Moan (Norway) 420

===== Ski jumping =====
- Four Hills Tournament:
  - World Cup in Innsbruck, Austria:
    - Individual 130m hill: (1) Wolfgang Loitzl (Austria) 261.0 points (126.5m/128.5m) (2) Gregor Schlierenzauer (Austria) 260.3 (126.0/127.5) (3) Martin Schmitt (Germany) 257.7 (128.5/125.5)
      - Four Hills Tournament standings (after 3 of 4 events): (1) Loitzl 822.5 points (2) Simon Ammann (Switzerland) 806.7 (3) Schlierenzauer 798.0
      - World Cup standings (after 10 of 28 events): (1) Ammann 797 points (2) Schlierenzauer 690 (3) Loitzl 639

=== January 3, 2009 (Saturday) ===
==== American football ====
- NFL Playoffs Wild card round:
  (Seedings in parentheses)
  - NFC: (4) Arizona Cardinals 30, (5) Atlanta Falcons 24
    - The Cardinals win in their first home playoff game since 1947.
  - AFC: (4) San Diego Chargers 23, (5) Indianapolis Colts 17 (OT)
    - Darren Sproles' 22-yard rushing TD sends the Chargers to the Divisional playoffs for the third consecutive season.
- NCAA Bowl Games:
  - International Bowl: Connecticut 38, Buffalo 20
    - The Huskies score 28 unanswered points to come back from a ten-point deficit.

==== Cricket ====
- South Africa in Australia:
  - 3rd Test in Sydney, day 1:
    - Australia 267/6 (Michael Clarke 73*, Dale Steyn 2/71).
- Sri Lanka in Bangladesh:
  - 2nd Test in Chittagong, day 1:
    - Sri Lanka 371/6 (Tillakaratne Dilshan 162, Mashrafe Mortaza 2/48).
- West Indies in New Zealand:
  - 2nd ODI in Christchurch:
    - New Zealand 152/8 (Jesse Ryder 32, Fidel Edwards 3/26); West Indies 158/5 (Ramnaresh Sarwan 67*, Jacob Oram 1/25). Match reduced to 28 overs each by rain. West Indies win by 5 wickets (D/L method) and lead 5-match series 1–0.

==== Ice hockey ====
- World Junior Championships in Ottawa, Ontario, Canada
  - Relegation Round (at the Ottawa Civic Centre):
    - Finland 7–1 Kazakhstan
  - Semifinals (at Scotiabank Place):
    - **Sweden** 5–3 Slovakia
    - **Canada** 6–5(SO) Russia

==== Tennis ====
- Capitala World Tennis Championship in Abu Dhabi, United Arab Emirates:
  - Final:
    - **Andy Murray** (United Kingdom) def. Rafael Nadal (Spain) 6–4, 5–7, 6–3
- Hopman Cup in Perth, Australia:
  - Group B:
    - France 3–0 Chinese Taipei

==== Winter sports ====
===== Cross-country skiing =====
- Tour de Ski stage 6 in Val di Fiemme, Italy:
  - 10 km classic women mass start: (1) Virpi Kuitunen (Finland) 30min 10.3sec, (2) Petra Majdič (Slovenia) at 13.8sec, (3) Aino-Kaisa Saarinen (Finland) 20.5
    - Overall standings (after 6 of 7 stages): (1) Kuitunen 1hr 29min 14.5sec, (2) Saarinen at 31.7sec, (3) Majdic (SLO) 49.1
  - 20 km classic men mass start, 15:30 CET: (1) Axel Teichmann (Germany) 55min 19.2sec, (2) Sami Jauhojärvi (Finland) at 0.3sec, (3) Nikolai Chebotko (Kazakhstan) 1.3
    - Overall standings (after 6 of 7 stages): (1) Dario Cologna (Switzerland) 2hr 20min 53.4sec, (2) Teichmann 2hr 21:27.5, (3) Eldar Roenning (Norway) 2hr 21:58.6

===== Luge =====
- World Cup 4 in Königssee, Germany:
  - Women: (1) Tatjana Hüfner (Germany) (2) Natalie Geisenberger (Germany) (3) Anke Wischnewski (Germany)
    - Overall standings (after 4 of 9 races): (1) Hüfner 385 (2) Geisenberger 330 (3)Wischnewski 280
  - Doubles: (1) Patric Leitner/Alexander Resch (Germany) (2) Tobias Wendl/Tobias Arlt (Germany) (3) Andreas Linger/Wolfgang Linger (Austria)
    - Overall standings (after 4 of 9 races): (1) Christian Oberstolz/Patrick Gruber (Italy) 320 (2) Linger/Linger 290 (3) Leitner/Resch 264

===== Nordic combined =====
- World Cup in Schonach, Germany:
  - 4x5km Team: (1) Germany 43:28.1 (2) Norway 43:47.7 (3) Austria 44:02.8

=== January 2, 2009 (Friday) ===
==== American football ====
- NCAA Bowl Games:
  (BCS ranking in parentheses)
  - Cotton Bowl Classic: (25) Mississippi 47, (8) Texas Tech 34
  - Liberty Bowl: Kentucky 25, East Carolina 19
    - The Wildcats win three straight bowl games for the first time in school history.
- Bowl Championship Series:
  - Sugar Bowl: (6) Utah 31, (4) Alabama 17
    - The Utes jump to a 21–0 lead in the first quarter and never look back, finishing as this season's only unbeaten Division I FBS team.

==== Ice hockey ====
- World Junior Championships in Ottawa, Ontario, Canada
  - Relegation Round (at the Ottawa Civic Centre):
    - Germany 1–7 **Latvia**
  - Quarterfinals (at Scotiabank Place):
    - United States 3–5 **Slovakia**
    - **Russia** 5–1 Czech Republic

=== January 1, 2009 (Thursday) ===
==== American football ====
- NCAA Bowl Games:
  (BCS ranking in parentheses)
  - Outback Bowl: Iowa 31, South Carolina 10
  - Gator Bowl: Nebraska 26, Clemson 21
  - Capital One Bowl: (15) Georgia 24, (18) Michigan State 12
- Bowl Championship Series
  - Rose Bowl: (5) Southern California 38, (8) Penn State 24
  - Orange Bowl: (19) Virginia Tech 20, (12) Cincinnati 7
    - The Hokies' win ends an eight-game BCS losing streak for the ACC.

==== Ice hockey ====
- 2009 NHL Winter Classic at Wrigley Field, Chicago:
  - Detroit Red Wings 6, Chicago Blackhawks 4
    - The Wings won the 701st meeting of these Original Six rivals in front of 40,818 fans.

==== Winter sports ====
===== Cross-country skiing =====
- Tour de Ski stage 5 in Nove Mesto, Czech Republic:
  - 1.2 km Sprint freestyle men: (1) Petter Northug (Norway) (2) Tor Arne Hetland (Norway) (3) Cristian Zorzi (Italy)
    - Overall standings (after five of seven Tour de Ski rounds): (1) Dario Cologna (Switzerland) 1 hr 26 min 02.4 sec (2) Vasily Rochev (Russia) 1 h 26:25.9 (3) Eldar Rønning (Norway) 1 h 26:34.9
  - 1.2 km Sprint freestyle women: (1) Arianna Follis (Italy) (2) Petra Majdič (Slovenia) (3) Aino-Kaisa Saarinen (Finland)
    - Overall standings (after five of seven Tour de Ski rounds): (1) Saarinen 59:30.4 (2) Virpi Kuitunen (Finland) at 13.8 (3) Marit Bjørgen (Norway) 37.0

===== Ski jumping =====
- Four Hills Tournament:
  - World Cup in Garmisch-Partenkirchen, Germany:
    - Individual 140m hill: (1) Wolfgang Loitzl (Austria) 276.3 points (134.5/136.5m) (2) Simon Ammann (Switzerland) 274.6 (140.0/134.5) (3) Harri Olli (Finland) 258.6 (133.0/131.5)
      - Four Hills standings (after two of four events): (1) Loitzl 561.5 points (2) Ammann 561.0 (3) Gregor Schlierenzauer (Austria) 537.7
      - World Cup standings (after 9 of 28 events): (1) Ammann 765 points (2) Schlierenzauer 610 (3) Loitzl 539
