= Zimbabwean cricket team in Bangladesh in 2008–09 =

	Zimbabwe	Bangladesh
- Dates: 6 January 2009 – 23 January 2009
Captains	Prosper Utseya	Mohammad Ashraful

One Day International series
- Results: Bangladesh won the 3-match series 2–1
Most runs	Sean Williams (105)	Raqibul Hasan (94)
Most wickets	Ray Price (7)	Mashrafe Mortaza (8)
- Player of the series: Shakib Al Hasan

The Zimbabwean cricket team toured Bangladesh in January 2009, participating in the Tri-Series in Bangladesh in 2008-09, winning its only tour match against a Bangladesh Cricket Board Academy team and winning one of the three One Day International's (ODI's) against the Bangladesh national cricket team.

== Tour Matches ==
=== Only Tour match ===
6–8 January
Scorecard

Bangladesh Cricket Board Academy	v	Zimbabwe
59 (23.4 overs); Marshall Ayub 18 (45); Elton Chigumbura 3/7 (5 overs)		89 (21.3 overs); Hamilton Masakadza 21 (29); Sajidul Islam 5/14 (6.3 overs)
108 (43.3 overs); Naeem Islam 36 (103); Ray Price 6/21 (11.3 overs)		273 (65.2 overs); Tatenda Taibu 70 (90); Nazmul Hossain 4/49 (16 overs)

Zimbabwe won by 195 runs
Shaheed Chandu Stadium, Bogra, Bangladesh
Umpires: Mahfuzur Rahman & Tanvir Ahmed

== Tri-Nation Series ==
For the results of the Tri-Nation Series, please see Tri-Series in Bangladesh in 2008-09

== ODI series ==
=== 1st ODI ===
19 January
Scorecard

Zimbabwe; 127/8 (49.2 overs)	v	Bangladesh; 124 (48.1 overs)
Malcolm Waller 24 (48); Shakib Al Hasan 3/11 (10 overs)		Raqibul Hasan 28 (33); Ray Price 4/22 (10 overs)

Zimbabwe won by 2 wickets
Sher-e-Bangla Cricket Stadium, Dhaka, Bangladesh
Umpires: Nadir Shah & Zameer Haider
Player of the match: Ray Price

=== 2nd ODI ===
21 January
Scorecard

Zimbabwe; 160/9 (50 overs)	v	Bangladesh; 164/4 (44.5 overs)
Sean Williams 59 (89); Nazmul Hossain 3/28 (10 overs)		Raqibul Hasan 52*; Prosper Utseya 1/24 (10 overs)

Bangladesh won by 6 wickets
Sher-e-Bangla Cricket Stadium, Dhaka, Bangladesh
Umpires: Enamul Haque & Zameer Haider
Player of the match: Raqibul Hasan

=== 3rd ODI ===
23 January
Scorecard

Zimbabwe; 119/9 (37 overs)	v	Bangladesh; 121/4 (32.3 overs)
Sean Williams 36 (46); Shakib Al Hasan 3/15 (8 overs)		Tamim Iqbal 34 (49); Ray Price 2/9 (7 overs)

Bangladesh won by 6 wickets
Sher-e-Bangla Cricket Stadium, Dhaka, Bangladesh
Umpires: Enamul Haque & Zameer Haider
Player of the match: Mashrafe Mortaza

Heavy fog delayed the start of play, so the match was reduced to 37 overs per team.
