= Sri Lankan cricket team in Bangladesh in 2008–09 =

Sri Lankan cricket team in Bangladesh in 2008-09
	Bangladesh	Sri Lanka
- Dates: 23 December 2008 – 14 January 2009
Captains	Mohammad Ashraful	Mahela Jayawardene

Test series
- Result: Sri Lanka won the 2-match series 2–0
- Player of the series: Tillakaratne Dilshan

The Sri Lankan cricket team toured Bangladesh between 21 December 2008 and 14 January 2009. The team played two Tests and took part in a three match One Day International tournament also featuring Zimbabwe.

== Squads ==
Test series
Bangladesh	Sri Lanka
Mohammad Ashraful	Mahela Jayawardene
Mashrafe Mortaza	Tillakaratne Dilshan
Enamul Haque Jr	Dilhara Fernando
Imrul Kayes	Rangana Herath
Junaid Siddique	Prasanna Jayawardene
Mahbubul Alam	Chamara Kapugedera
Mehrab Hossain, Jr.	Farveez Maharoof
Mushfiqur Rahim	Muttiah Muralitharan
Rajin Saleh	Dammika Prasad
Raqibul Hasan	Thilan Samaraweera
Sajidul Islam	Kumar Sangakkara
Shahadat Hossain	Thilan Thushara
Shakib Al Hasan	Chaminda Vaas
Tamim Iqbal	Michael Vandort
	Malinda Warnapura

== Tour matches ==
=== Three-day: Bangladesh Cricket Board XI vs Sri Lankans ===
21–23 December 2008
Scorecard

BCB XI (Bangladesh)	v	(Sri Lanka) Sri Lankans
88 (34.1 overs); Imrul Kayes 26 (41); Rangana Herath 6/16 (11.1 overs)		316 (95.3 overs); Tillakaratne Dilshan 88 (139); Raihanuddin Arafat 3/37 (10.3 overs)

Match drawn
Bangladesh Krira Shiksha Pratisthan, Savar
Umpires: Nadir Shah (Ban) and Sharfuddoula (Ban)

- No play was possible on Day 1 due to fog. Day 2 was shortened, also due to fog.
- Players per side: Bangladesh Cricket Board XI 14 (11 batting, 11 fielding); Sri Lankans 12 (11 batting, 11 fielding)

== Test series ==
=== 1st Test ===
26–31 December 2008
Scorecard

Sri Lanka	v	Bangladesh
293 (89.4 overs); Thilan Samaraweera 90 (141); Shakib Al Hasan 5/70 (28.4 overs)		178 (60 overs); Imrul Kayes 33 (53); Muttiah Muralitharan 6/49 (22 overs)
405/6d (108 overs); Mahela Jayawardene 166 (269); Mehrab Hossain jnr 2/37 (10 overs)		413 (126.2 overs); Mohammad Ashraful 101 (193); Muttiah Muralitharan 4/141 (48 overs)

Sri Lanka won by 107 runs
Sher-e-Bangla Cricket Stadium, Mirpur
Umpires: Steve Bucknor (WI) and Nigel Llong (Eng)
Player of the match: Shakib Al Hasan (Ban)

- 29 December was a rest day due to the Bangladeshi general election

=== 2nd Test ===
3–7 January 2009
Scorecard

Sri Lanka	v	Bangladesh
385 (94 overs); Tillakaratne Dilshan 162 (165); Shakib Al Hasan 4/109 (30 overs)		208 (76.2 overs); Mashrafe Mortaza 63 (89); Ajantha Mendis 4/71 (28 overs)
447/6d (127 overs); Tillakaratne Dilshan 143 (175); Mohammad Ashraful 2/56 (17 overs)		158 (49.2 overs); Shakib Al Hasan 46 (49); Tillakaratne Dilshan 4/10 (4.2 overs)

Sri Lanka won by 465 runs
Zohur Ahmed Chowdhury Stadium, Chittagong
Umpires: Steve Bucknor (WI) and Nigel Llong (Eng)
Player of the match: Tillakaratne Dilshan (SL)

- Sri Lanka won the toss and elected to bat.
- Mahela Jayawardene (SL) played in his 100th Test.
