= Tri-Series in Bangladesh in 2008–09 =

Tri-Series in Bangladesh in 2009
- Date: 10 January 2009 – 16 January 2009
- Location: Bangladesh
- Result: Sri Lanka wins
- Player of the series: Shakib Al Hasan
Teams
Bangladesh	Sri Lanka	Zimbabwe
Captains
Mohammad Ashraful	Mahela Jayawardene	Prosper Utseya
Most runs
Shakib Al Hasan 153 Raqibul Hasan 69 Mohammad Ashraful 57	Sanath Jayasuriya 76; Kumar Sangakkara 63; Jehan Mubarak 57	Elton Chigumbura 70; Stuart Matsikenyeri 57; Tatenda Taibu 26
Most wickets
Mashrafe Mortaza 6 Shakib Al Hasan 5 Naeem Islam & Rubel Hossain 4	Ajantha Mendis & Nuwan Kulasekara 7 Muttiah Muralitharan 4	Ed Rainsford 4 Prosper Utseya & Ray Price 3

The Tri-Series in Bangladesh in 2009 was a One Day International cricket tournament held in Bangladesh from January 10 to January 16, 2009. The tri-series involved the national teams of Bangladesh, Sri Lanka and Zimbabwe, with Sri Lanka winning the tournament.

== Squads ==
Squads for the Tri-Series
#	Bangladesh	Sri Lanka	Zimbabwe
1	Mohammad Ashraful (Captain)	Mahela Jayawardene (Captain)	Prosper Utseya (Captain)
2	Mushfiqur Rahim (WK)	Kumar Sangakkara (WK)	Tatenda Taibu (WK)
3	Tamim Iqbal	Upul Tharanga	Elton Chigumbura
4	Junaid Siddique	Dammika Prasad	Graeme Cremer
5	Raqibul Hasan	Thilina Kandamby	Keith Dabengwa
6	Shakib Al Hasan	Dilhara Fernando	Hamilton Masakadza
7	Naeem Islam	Sanath Jayasuriya	Stuart Matsikenyeri
8	Mahmudullah	Nuwan Kulasekara	Chris Mpofu
9	Mashrafe Mortaza	Farveez Maharoof	Tawanda Mupariwa
10	Rubel Hossain	Angelo Mathews	Forster Mutizwa
11	Nazmul Hossain	Ajantha Mendis	Ray Price
12	Rubel Hossain	Jehan Mubarak	Ed Rainsford
13	Mehrab Hossain jnr	Muttiah Muralitharan	Vusi Sibanda
14	Mahbubul Alam	Thilan Thushara	Malcolm Waller
15	Enamul Haque jnr	Chamara Kapugedera	Sean Williams

== Group stage ==
=== Points table ===
Group Stage
Pos	Team	Pld	W	L	T	NR	BP	Pts	NRR	For	Against
1	Sri Lanka	2	1	1	0	0	1	5	1.279	357/81	231/73.5
2	Bangladesh	2	1	1	0	0	1	5	−0.039	318/73.5	352/81
3	Zimbabwe	2	1	1	0	0	0	4	−0.920	285/100	377/100

Source: ESPNcricinfo

=== Matches ===
10 January
(Scorecard)

Zimbabwe; 205/9 (50 overs)	v	Bangladesh; 167 (46.2 overs)
Elton Chigumbura 64 (95); Shakib Al Hasan 3/23 (10 overs)		Shakib Al Hasan 52 (66); Prosper Utseya 2/22 (10 overs)

Zimbabwe by 38 runs
Shere Bangla National Stadium, Mirpur Thana
Umpires: Billy Doctrove (WIN) & Nadir Shah (BAN)
Player of the match: Elton Chigumbura

12 January
(Scorecard)

Sri Lanka; 210/6 (50 overs)	v	Zimbabwe; 80 (28.2 overs)
Angelo Mathews 52 (96); Ed Rainsford 3/41 (10 overs)		Stuart Matsikenyeri 15 (29); Nuwan Kulasekara 3/13 (7 overs)

Sri Lanka by 130 runs
Shere Bangla National Stadium, Mirpur Thana
Umpires: Billy Doctrove (WIN) & Enamul Haque (BAN)
Player of the match: Angelo Mathews

14 January
(Scorecard)

Sri Lanka; 147 (30.3 overs)	v	Bangladesh; 151/5 (23.5 overs)
Sanath Jayasuriya 54 (64); Rubel Hossain 4/33 (5.3 overs)		Shakib Al Hasan 92 (69); Thilan Thushara 1/12 (4 overs)

Bangladesh by 5 Wickets
Shere Bangla National Stadium, Mirpur Thana
Umpires: Billy Doctrove (WIN) & Nadir Shah (BAN)
Player of the match: Shakib Al Hasan

=== Final ===
16 January
(Scorecard)

Bangladesh; 152 (49.4 overs)	v	Sri Lanka; 153/8 (48.1 overs)
Raqibul Hasan 43* (107); Nuwan Kulasekara 3/19 (8 overs)		Kumar Sangakkara 59 (133); Nazmul Hossain 3/30 (10 overs)

Sri Lanka by 2 wickets
Shere Bangla National Stadium, Mirpur Thana
Umpires: Billy Doctrove (WIN) & Enamul Haque (BAN)
Player of the match: Kumar Sangakkara
