= 2007–08 Bobsleigh World Cup =

The 2007–08 Bobsleigh World Cup is a multi race tournament over a season for bobsleigh. The season started on 26 November 2007 and ended on 10 February 2008. The World Cup is organised by the FIBT who also run world cups and championships in skeleton.

== Calendar ==
| Date | Place | Disc. | Winner | Second | Third |
|---|---|---|---|---|---|
| November 30 - December 1, 2007 | (Canada) Calgary | Two-man | Germany; André Lange; Kevin Kuske | United States; Steven Holcomb; Curtis Tomasevicz | Austria; Wolfgang Stampfer; Martin Lachkovics |
| November 30 - December 1, 2007 | (Canada) Calgary | Four-man | United States; Steven Holcomb; Pavle Jovanovic; Steve Mesler; Brock Kreitzburg | Germany; André Lange; René Hoppe; Kevin Kuske; Martin Putze | Canada; Pierre Lueders; David Bissett; Lascelles Brown; Justin Kripps |
| November 30 - December 1, 2007 | (Canada) Calgary | Two-woman | Canada; Helen Upperton; Jennifer Ciochetti | Germany; Cathleen Martini; Janine Tischer | Germany; Sandra Kiriasis; Berit Wiacker |
| December 7–8, 2007 | (United States) Park City | Two-man | United States; Steven Holcomb; Curtis Tomasevicz | Germany; Thomas Florschuetz; Mirko Paetzold | Austria; Wolfgang Stampfer; Johannes Wipplinger |
| December 7–8, 2007 | (United States) Park City | Four-man | United States; Steven Holcomb; Pavle Jovanovic; Steve Mesler; Brock Kreitzburg | Germany; André Lange; René Hoppe; Kevin Kuske; Martin Putze | Canada; Pierre Lueders; Ken Kotyk; Lascelles Brown; Justin Kripps |
| December 7–8, 2007 | (United States) Park City | Two-woman | Germany; Sandra Kiriasis; Romy Logsch | Germany; Cathleen Martini; Janine Tischer | United States; Shauna Rohbock; Valerie Fleming |
| December 15–16, 2007 | (United States) Lake Placid | Two-man | Canada; Pierre Lueders; Lascelles Brown | Germany; André Lange; Martin Putze | United States; Steven Holcomb; Curtis Tomasevicz |
| December 15–16, 2007 | (United States) Lake Placid | Four-man | Russia; Alexandre Zoubkov; Alexei Seliverstov; Philippe Egorov; Alexey Andryunin | United States; Steven Holcomb; Pavle Jovanovic; Steve Mesler; Brock Kreitzburg | Canada; Pierre Lueders; Ken Kotyk; Lascelles Brown; Justin Kripps |
| December 15–16, 2007 | (United States) Lake Placid | Two-woman | Germany; Sandra Kiriasis; Romy Logsch | Canada; Helen Upperton; Jennifer Ciochetti | Canada; Kaillie Humphries; Shelley-Ann Brown |
| January 11–13, 2008 | (Italy) Cortina d'Ampezzo | ~~Two-man~~ | cancelled | | |
| January 11–13, 2008 | (Italy) Cortina d'Ampezzo | Four-man | Canada; Pierre Lueders; Ken Kotyk; David Bissett; Justin Kripps | Russia; Alexandre Zoubkov; Alexei Seliverstov; Philippe Egorov; Evgeny Pechenkin | Switzerland; Ivo Rüegg; Michael Lukas; Roman Handschin; Cédric Grand |
| January 11–13, 2008 | (Italy) Cortina d'Ampezzo | Two-woman | Germany; Sandra Kiriasis; Romy Logsch | Canada; Helen Upperton; Heather Moyse | Germany; Cathleen Martini; Janine Tischer |
| January 18–20, 2008 | (Italy) Cesana European Championships 2008 | Two-man _{rescheduled from Cortina d'Ampezzo} | Italy; Simone Bertazzo; Samuele Romanini | Germany; André Lange; Martin Putze | Switzerland; Ivo Rüegg; Roman Handschin |
| January 18–20, 2008 | (Italy) Cesana European Championships 2008 | Two-man | Russia; Alexandre Zoubkov; Alexey Voevoda | Germany; André Lange; Kevin Kuske | Italy; Simone Bertazzo; Samuele Romanini |
| January 18–20, 2008 | (Italy) Cesana European Championships 2008 | Four-man | Latvia; Jānis Miņins; Daumants Dreiškens; Oskars Melbārdis; Intars Dambis | Switzerland; Martin Galliker; Juerg Egger; Olexander Streltsov; Patrick Bloechliger | Germany; André Lange; René Hoppe; Kevin Kuske; Martin Putze |
| January 18–20, 2008 | (Italy) Cesana European Championships 2008 | Two-woman | Canada; Helen Upperton; Jennifer Ciochetti | United States; Shauna Rohbock; Valerie Fleming | Germany; Sandra Kiriasis; Berit Wiacker |
| January 26–27, 2008 | (Switzerland) St. Moritz | Two-man | Germany; André Lange; Martin Putze | Switzerland; Ivo Rüegg; Cédric Grand | Canada; Pierre Lueders; Lascelles Brown |
| January 26–27, 2008 | (Switzerland) St. Moritz | Four-man | Latvia; Jānis Miņins; Daumants Dreiškens; Oskars Melbārdis; Intars Dambis | Russia; Alexandre Zoubkov; Roman Oreshnikov; Dmitry Trunenkov; Dmitriy Stepushkin | Switzerland; Ivo Rüegg; Tommy Herzog; Roman Handschin; Cédric Grand |
| January 26–27, 2008 | (Switzerland) St. Moritz | Two-woman | Germany; Sandra Kiriasis; Romy Logsch | Germany; Cathleen Martini; Janine Tischer | Canada; Helen Upperton; Heather Moyse |
| February 1–3, 2008 | (Germany) Königssee | Two-man | Germany; Matthias Höpfner; Alex Mann | Germany; André Lange; Kevin Kuske | Canada; Pierre Lueders; Lascelles Brown |
| February 1–3, 2008 | (Germany) Königssee | Four-man | Germany; André Lange; René Hoppe; Kevin Kuske; Alex Metzger | Russia; Alexandre Zoubkov; Roman Oreshnikov; Dmitry Trunenkov; Dmitriy Stepushkin; United States; Steven Holcomb; Pavle Jovanovic; Steve Mesler; Brock Kreitzburg | |
| February 1–3, 2008 | (Germany) Königssee | Two-woman | Germany; Cathleen Martini; Janine Tischer | Germany; Sandra Kiriasis; Berit Wiacker | Germany; Claudia Schramm; Nicole Herschmann |
| February 9–10, 2008 | (Germany) Winterberg | Two-man | Russia; Alexandre Zoubkov; Alexey Voevoda | Germany; Thomas Florschuetz; Enrico Kühn | Germany; Matthias Höpfner; Alex Mann |
| February 9–10, 2008 | (Germany) Winterberg | Four-man | Germany; André Lange; René Hoppe; Marc Kuehne; Alex Metzger | Russia; Alexandre Zoubkov; Alexey Andryunin; Alexander Ushakov; Dmitriy Stepushkin | Latvia; Jānis Miņins; Daumants Dreiškens; Oskars Melbārdis; Intars Dambis |
| February 9–10, 2008 | (Germany) Winterberg | Two-woman | Germany; Sandra Kiriasis; Berit Wiacker | Germany; Cathleen Martini; Janine Tischer | United States; Shauna Rohbock; Valerie Fleming |
| February 11–24, 2008 | (Germany) Altenberg | FIBT World Championships 2008 | | | |

== Standings ==
=== Two-man ===
| Pos. | Bobsledder | CAL | PAC | LPL | CES | CES | SMO | KÖN | WIN | Points |
|---|---|---|---|---|---|---|---|---|---|---|
| 1. | (Germany) André Lange | 1 | 4 | 2 | 2 | 2 | 1 | 2 | 9 | 1634 |
| 2. | (Switzerland) Ivo Rüegg | 6 | 9 | 7 | 3 | 4 | 2 | 5 | 5 | 1466 |
| 3. | (Russia) Alexandre Zoubkov | 8 | 7 | 4 | 4 | 1 | 16 | 7 | 1 | 1426 |
| 4. | (United States) Steven Holcomb | 2 | 1 | 3 | 5 | 8 | 17 | 11 | 5 | 1387 |
| 5. | (Italy) Simone Bertazzo | 9 | 6 | 5 | 1 | 3 | 5 | 15 | 8 | 1385 |
| 6. | (Germany) Thomas Florschuetz | 4 | 2 | 6 | 10 | 15 | 7 | 6 | 2 | 1380 |
| 7. | (Canada) Pierre Lueders | 5 | 5 | 1 | 8 | 9 | 3 | 3 | | 1305 |
| 8. | (Latvia) Jānis Miņins | 10 | 11 | 12 | 6 | 6 | 14 | 8 | 16 | 1128 |
| 9. | (Austria) Wolfgang Stampfer | 3 | 3 | DSQ | 9 | 5 | 13 | 16 | 10 | 1096 |
| 10. | (Monaco) Patrice Servelle | 13 | 12 | 16 | 11 | 7 | 12 | 12 | 4 | 1096 |
| 11. | (Czech Republic) Ivo Danilevič | 20 | 17 | 9 | 11 | 10 | 10 | 13 | 7 | 1020 |
| 12. | (Switzerland) Daniel Schmid | 12 | 13 | 9 | 16 | 12 | 9 | 14 | 14 | 1000 |
| 13. | (Netherlands) Edwin Van Calker | 16 | 18 | 15 | 13 | 16 | 11 | 4 | 13 | 944 |
| 14. | (Germany) Matthias Höpfner | | | | 7 | 11 | 4 | 1 | 3 | 921 |
| 15. | (Italy) Fabrizio Tosini | 18 | 14 | 13 | 15 | 13 | 18 | 17 | 12 | 832 |
| 16. | (Canada) Lyndon Rush | 10 | 10 | 8 | 14 | 20 | 25 | 18 | 20 | 816 |
| 17. | (Switzerland) Martin Galliker | 21 | 20 | 17 | 18 | 18 | 8 | 9 | 18 | 770 |
| 18. | (Austria) Jürgen Loacker | 15 | 16 | 18 | 20 | 14 | 21 | 24 | 11 | 703 |
| 19. | (United States) Mike Kohn | 13 | | | 19 | 21 | 6 | 10 | 15 | 680 |
| 20. | (Russia) Yevgeni Popov | 17 | 23 | 19 | 22 | 17 | 24 | 19 | 17 | 563 |

=== Four-man ===
| Pos. | Bobsledder | CAL | PAC | LPL | COR | CES | SMO | KÖN | WIN | Points |
|---|---|---|---|---|---|---|---|---|---|---|
| 1. | (Germany) André Lange | 2 | 2 | 5 | 5 | 3 | 7 | 1 | 1 | 1606 |
| 2. | (Russia) Alexandre Zoubkov | 7 | 6 | 1 | 2 | 5 | 2 | 2 | 2 | 1593 |
| 3. | (Latvia) Jānis Miņins | 5 | 4 | 9 | 7 | 1 | 1 | 4 | 3 | 1538 |
| 4. | (United States) Steven Holcomb | 1 | 1 | 2 | 8 | 11 | 6 | 2 | 4 | 1534 |
| 5. | (Switzerland) Ivo Rüegg | 6 | 9 | 6 | 3 | 6 | 3 | 10 | 5 | 1408 |
| 6. | (Canada) Pierre Lueders | 3 | 3 | 3 | 1 | 8 | 5 | 6 | | 1345 |
| 7. | (Switzerland) Martin Galliker | 12 | 16 | 11 | 9 | 2 | 4 | 13 | 11 | 1170 |
| 8. | (Russia) Yevgeni Popov | 4 | 5 | 4 | DSQ | 4 | 18 | 15 | 6 | 1120 |
| 9. | (Germany) Thomas Florschuetz | 8 | 10 | DSQ | 5 | 9 | 11 | 7 | 7 | 1112 |
| 10. | (Russia) Dmitry Abramovitch | 15 | 14 | 7 | 11 | 7 | 10 | 9 | | 984 |
| 11. | (Italy) Fabrizio Tosini | 16 | 12 | 10 | 12 | 10 | 26 | 16 | 14 | 884 |
| 12. | (Austria) Wolfgang Stampfer | 9 | 15 | 13 | 15 | 16 | 22 | 22 | 12 | 816 |
| 13. | (Switzerland) Daniel Schmid | 10 | 17 | DSQ | 16 | 14 | 13 | 19 | 8 | 794 |
| 14. | (Germany) Matthias Höpfner | | | | 4 | 13 | 9 | 5 | 15 | 752 |
| 15. | (Netherlands) Edwin Van Calker | 19 | 20 | 16 | 17 | 21 | 21 | 14 | 9 | 714 |
| 16. | (Czech Republic) Ivo Danilevič | 20 | 23 | 15 | 10 | 19 | 19 | 20 | 16 | 678 |
| 17. | (United States) Mike Kohn | 21 | | | 14 | 20 | 12 | 11 | 10 | 650 |
| 18. | (Austria) Juergen Loacker | | | | 12 | 15 | 8 | 8 | 17 | 640 |
| 19. | (United Kingdom) Lee Johnston | 13 | 18 | 18 | | | 16 | 17 | 13 | 584 |
| 20. | (Italy) Simone Bertazzo | 11 | 13 | 14 | 18 | 12 | | | | 576 |

=== Two-woman ===
| Pos. | Bobsledder | CAL | PAC | LPL | COR | CES | SMO | KÖN | WIN | Points |
|---|---|---|---|---|---|---|---|---|---|---|
| 1. | (Germany) Sandra Kiriasis | 3 | 1 | 1 | 1 | 3 | 1 | 2 | 1 | 1735 |
| 2. | (Germany) Cathleen Martini | 2 | 2 | 4 | 3 | 4 | 2 | 1 | 2 | 1649 |
| 3. | (Canada) Helen Upperton | 1 | 4 | 2 | 2 | 1 | 3 | 4 | 5 | 1638 |
| 4. | (United States) Shauna Rohbock | 5 | 3 | 5 | 4 | 2 | 6 | 6 | 3 | 1522 |
| 5. | (Canada) Kaillie Humphries | 4 | 6 | 3 | 8 | 5 | 7 | 5 | 9 | 1416 |
| 6. | (Germany) Claudia Schramm | 6 | 7 | 8 | 5 | 8 | 10 | 3 | 4 | 1384 |
| 7. | (United Kingdom) Nicole Minichiello | 11 | 12 | 7 | 7 | 9 | 4 | 11 | 11 | 1216 |
| 8. | (Switzerland) Maya Bamert | 7 | 13 | 9 | 10 | 6 | 15 | 7 | 6 | 1208 |
| 9. | (Switzerland) Sabrina Hafner | 10 | 10 | 12 | 9 | 10 | 11 | 9 | 10 | 1144 |
| 10. | (Italy) Jessica Gillarduzzi | 14 | 9 | 10 | 6 | 11 | 14 | 13 | 13 | 1072 |
| 11. | (United States) Erin Pac | 8 | 5 | 6 | | 14 | 9 | 17 | 7 | 1040 |
| 12. | (Canada) Lisa Szabon | 12 | 8 | 13 | 12 | 13 | 13 | 15 | 8 | 1040 |
| 13. | (Russia) Victoria Tokovaia | 13 | 11 | 11 | | 7 | 5 | 8 | 14 | 1016 |
| 14. | (United Kingdom) Jackie Davies | 15 | 15 | 14 | 14 | 22 | 17 | 16 | 17 | 760 |
| 15. | (Latvia) Aiva Aparjode | 16 | 14 | 15 | DSQ | 18 | 22 | 19 | 16 | 618 |
| 16. | (Japan) Manami Hino | 17 | 17 | 16 | | 20 | 19 | 20 | 18 | 562 |
| 17. | (Sweden) Karin Margareta Olsson | | | | 10 | 21 | 18 | 14 | 12 | 526 |
| 18. | (Netherlands) Esme Kamphuis | | | | 13 | 15 | 16 | 12 | | 448 |
| 19. | (United States) Jamia Jackson | | | | | 12 | 8 | 10 | | 432 |
| 20. | (Austria) Christine Muessiggang | | | | 15 | 19 | 21 | 18 | | 320 |
