= 2014 Winter Olympics medal table =

2014 Winter Olympics medals
- Location: Sochi, Russia

Highlights
- Most gold medals: Norway (11)
- Most total medals: Russia (29)
- Medalling NOCs: 26

World map showing the medal achievements of each country during the 2014 Winter Olympics Legend: Gold represents countries that won at least one gold medal Silver represents countries that won at least one silver medal Bronze represents countries that won at least one bronze medal Red represents countries that did not win any medals Grey represents countries that did not participate

The 2014 Winter Olympics, officially known as the XXII Olympic Winter Games, were a winter multi-sport event held in Sochi, Russia, from 7 to 23 February. A total of 2,873 athletes from 88 nations participated in 98 medal events in 7 sports across 15 different disciplines.

Initially, host nation Russia matched the Soviet Union's 1976 tally of thirteen gold medals, (Note: Russia is widely and legally considered to be the successor state of the Soviet Union.) (Note: The gold medal counts were previously topped by host nations in 1932 by the United States, in 1952 by Norway, and in 2010 by Canada.) but 4 gold, 8 silver and 1 bronze medals were later stripped due to doping. However, the Court of Arbitration for Sport reinstated 2 gold, 7 silver and 1 bronze medals, returning Russia to the first place in the medals standings. In 2024, one more gold medal was rescinded by the International Biathlon Union, putting Norway first in the gold medal count, with 11 gold medals. Russia still has the most medals overall, with 29.

The Netherlands achieved four podium sweeps in the speed skating, dominating the men's 500 metres, men's 5,000 metres, men's 10,000 metres, and women's 1,500 metres, surpassing the previous record of two podium sweeps. Slovenia won its first Winter Olympics gold medal ever, in alpine skiing. This was also the first Winter Olympic gold medal tie. Latvia won its first Olympic gold medal due to medals reallocation after the IOC retested doping samples in November 2017. Luger Armin Zöggeler of Italy became the first athlete to achieve six Winter Olympic medals over six consecutive games, all achieved at the men's singles event. Speed skater Ireen Wüst from the Netherlands achieved five medals (two gold and three silver), more than any other athlete. South Korean-born Russian short track speed skater Viktor Ahn, Norwegian cross-country skier Marit Bjørgen, and Belarusian biathlete Darya Domracheva tied for the most gold medals, with three each.

== Medal table ==
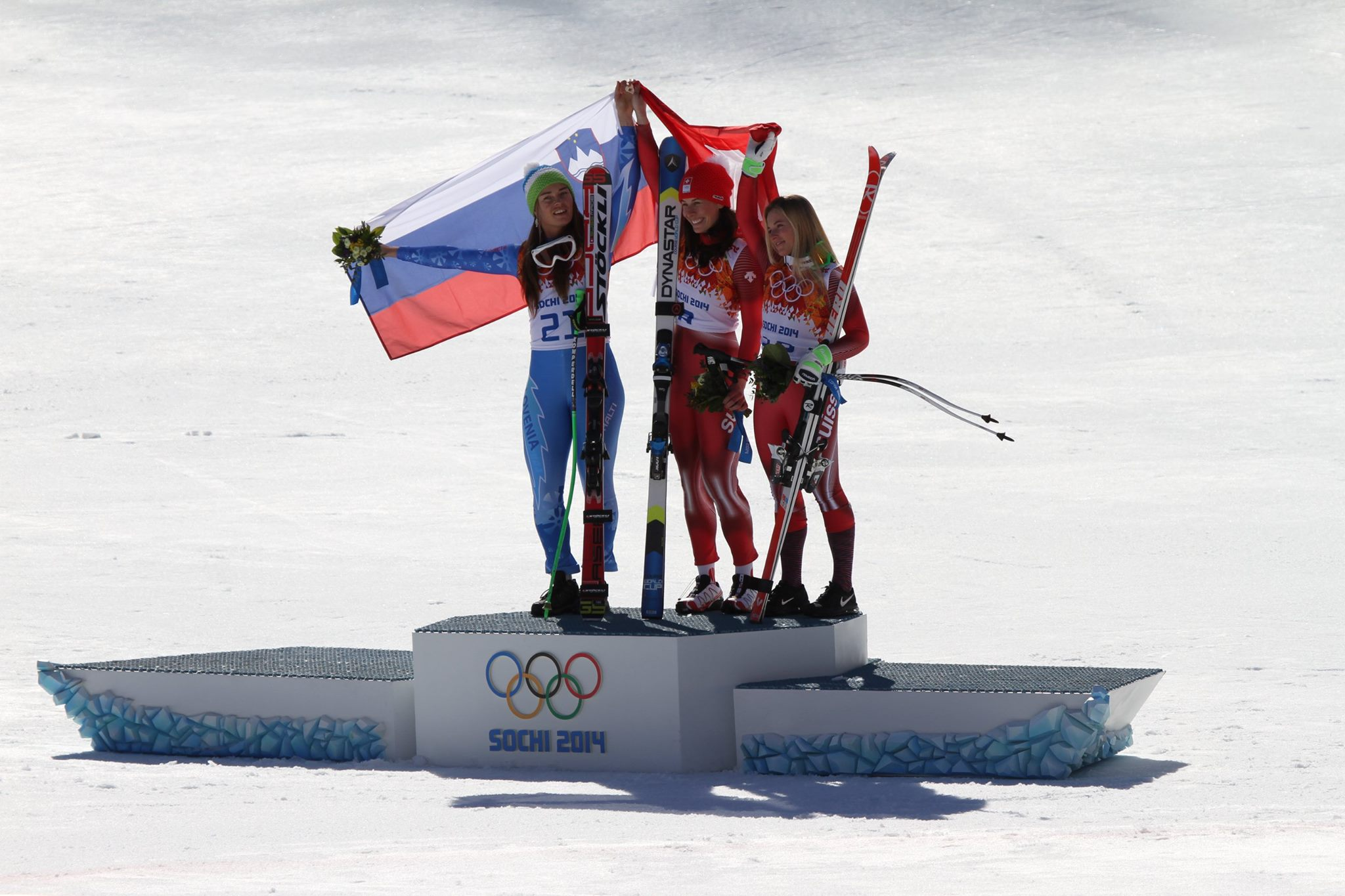
From left to right: Tina Maze of Slovenia (gold), Dominique Gisin of Switzerland (gold) and Lara Gut of Switzerland (bronze) atop the women's downhill alpine skiing podium in the first Winter Olympic gold medal tie.

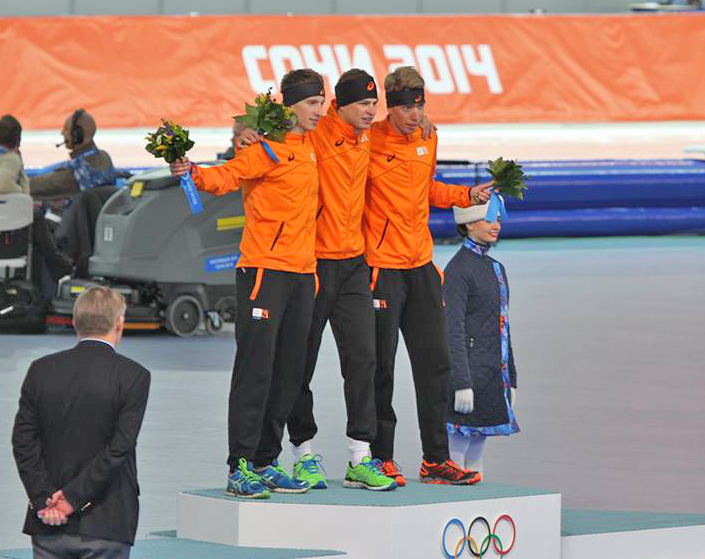
From left to right: Jan Blokhuijsen (silver), Sven Kramer (gold) and Jorrit Bergsma (bronze) with medals they earned in the men's 5,000 metres speed skating, one of the four podium sweeps by the Netherlands.

The medal table is based on information provided by the International Olympic Committee (IOC) and is consistent with IOC convention in its published medal tables. The table uses the Olympic medal table sorting method. By default, the table is ordered by the number of gold medals the athletes from a nation have won, where a nation is an entity represented by a National Olympic Committee (NOC). The number of silver medals is taken into consideration next, and then the number of bronze medals. If teams are still tied, equal ranking is given and they are listed alphabetically by their IOC country code.

In the women's downhill event in alpine skiing two gold medals were awarded for a first place tie, no silver medal was awarded for the event. In the men's super-G alpine skiing, two bronze medals were awarded for a third place tie.

Key

‡ Post-competition changes in medal standings (totals after changes)

* Host nation (Russia)

2014 Winter Olympics medal table
Rank	NOC	Gold	Silver	Bronze	Total
1	Norway	11	6	10	27
2	Russia*‡	10	10	9	29
3	Canada	10	10	5	25
4	United States‡	9	9	10	28
5	Germany	9	5	5	19
6	Netherlands	8	7	9	24
7	Switzerland‡	7	2	2	11
8	Belarus	5	0	1	6
9	Austria	4	9	4	17
10	France	4	4	7	15
11	Poland	4	1	1	6
12	China	3	4	2	9
13	South Korea	3	3	2	8
14	Sweden	2	7	6	15
15	Czech Republic	2	4	3	9
16	Slovenia	2	2	4	8
17	Japan	1	4	3	8
18	Finland	1	3	1	5
19	Great Britain‡	1	1	3	5
19	Latvia‡	1	1	3	5
21	Ukraine	1	0	1	2
22	Slovakia	1	0	0	1
23	Italy	0	2	6	8
24	Australia	0	2	1	3
25	Croatia	0	1	0	1
26	Kazakhstan	0	0	1	1
Totals (26 entries)		99	97	99	295

== Changes in medal standings ==
=== Russian team doping case ===
On 18 July 2016, the McLaren Report was published alleging that the Russian government had sanctioned the use of performance-enhancing drugs by Russian athletes in the 2014 Winter Olympics.

On 9 December 2016, a World Anti-Doping Agency report expanded upon the previous report and included the note that "Two [Russian] [sport] athletes, winners of 4 Sochi Olympic Gold medals, and a female Silver medal winner in [sport] had samples with salt readings that were physiologically impossible" and that "Twelve [Russian] medal winning athletes ... from 44 examined samples had scratches and marks on the inside of the caps of their B sample bottles, indicating tampering".

In December 2016, following the release of the McLaren Report on Russian doping at the Sochi Olympics, the International Olympic Committee announced the initiation of an investigation of 28 Russian athletes at the Sochi Olympic Games. The number later rose to 46.

From 1 November 2017 to 22 December 2017, the IOC handled 46 cases related to Russian team doping. Three cases were closed without sanction and without officially disclosing the names of suspected athletes. 43 Russian athletes were disqualified from the 2014 Winter Olympics and banned from competing in the 2018 edition and all other future Olympic Games, as part of the Oswald Commission proceedings.

All but one of these athletes appealed their bans to the Court of Arbitration for Sport. On 1 February 2018, the court overturned the sanctions on 28 athletes, meaning that their Sochi medals and results (except four-man bobsleigh) were reinstated, but decided that there was sufficient evidence against 11 athletes to uphold their Sochi sanctions. On 24 September 2020, the court overturned the sanctions on a further two athletes, meaning that one Sochi medal and result in women's biathlon sprint were reinstated, but decided that there was sufficient evidence against one other athlete to uphold Sochi sanctions in women's biathlon relay. The court also decided that none of the 42 athletes should be banned from all future Olympic Games, but only the 2018 Games.

Separately, on 15 February 2020, the International Biathlon Union announced that because of a doping violation, Evgeny Ustyugov and Russian men's 4 x 7.5km relay team had been disqualified from the 2014 Olympics. The IOC affirmed the decision and approved reallocation of medals in September 2025.

No.	Athlete	Sport	IOC decisions	CAS decision, 1 February 2018, 24 September 2020
			1 November 2017	
1	Alexander Legkov (RUS)	Cross-country skiing (gold) (silver)	Disqualified	Sanctions annulled
2	Evgeniy Belov (RUS)	Cross-country skiing	Disqualified	Sanctions annulled
			9 November 2017	
3	Julia Ivanova (RUS)	Cross-country skiing	Disqualified	Sanctions partially confirmed
4	Alexey Petukhov (RUS)	Cross-country skiing	Disqualified	Sanctions annulled
5	Evgenia Shapovalova (RUS)	Cross-country skiing	Disqualified	Sanctions annulled
6	Maxim Vylegzhanin (RUS)	Cross-country skiing (silver) (silver) (silver)	Disqualified	Sanctions annulled
7	Adelina Sotnikova (RUS)	Figure skating	Case closed	-
			22 November 2017	
8	Elena Nikitina (RUS)	Skeleton (bronze)	Disqualified	Sanctions annulled
9	Maria Orlova (RUS)	Skeleton	Disqualified	Sanctions annulled
10	Olga Potylitsina (RUS)	Skeleton	Disqualified	Sanctions annulled
11	Aleksandr Tretyakov (RUS)	Skeleton (gold)	Disqualified	Sanctions annulled
			24 November 2017	
12	Olga Stulneva (RUS)	Bobsleigh	Disqualified	Sanctions annulled
13	Aleksandr Zubkov (RUS)	Bobsleigh (gold) (gold)	Disqualified	Sanctions partially confirmed
14	Olga Fatkulina (RUS)	Speed skating (silver)	Disqualified	Sanctions annulled
15	Alexander Rumyantsev (RUS)	Speed skating	Disqualified	Sanctions annulled
			27 November 2017	
16	Sergei Chudinov (RUS)	Skeleton	Disqualified	Sanctions annulled
17	Aleksei Negodailo (RUS)	Bobsleigh (gold)	Disqualified	Sanctions annulled
18	Dmitry Trunenkov (RUS)	Bobsleigh (gold)	Disqualified	Sanctions annulled
19	Yana Romanova (RUS)	Biathlon (silver)	Disqualified	Sanctions annulled (Sept 2020)
20	Olga Vilukhina (RUS)	Biathlon (silver) (silver)	Disqualified	Sanctions annulled (Sept 2020)
			29 November 2017	
21	Aleksandr Kasyanov (RUS)	Bobsleigh	Disqualified	Sanctions partially confirmed
22	Aleksei Pushkarev (RUS)	Bobsleigh	Disqualified	Sanctions partially confirmed
23	Ilvir Khuzin (RUS)	Bobsleigh	Disqualified	Sanctions partially confirmed
			1 December 2017	
24	Yulia Chekaleva (RUS)	Cross-country skiing	Disqualified	Sanctions partially confirmed
25	Anastasia Dotsenko (RUS)	Cross-country skiing	Disqualified	Sanctions partially confirmed
26	Olga Zaitseva (RUS)	Biathlon (silver)	Disqualified	Sanctions partially confirmed (Sept 2020)
			12 December 2017	
27	Inna Dyubanok (RUS)	Ice hockey	Disqualified	Sanctions partially confirmed
28	Ekaterina Lebedeva (RUS)	Ice hockey	Disqualified	Sanctions annulled
29	Ekaterina Pashkevich (RUS)	Ice hockey	Disqualified	Sanctions annulled
30	Anna Shibanova (RUS)	Ice hockey	Disqualified	Sanctions partially confirmed
31	Ekaterina Smolentseva (RUS)	Ice hockey	Disqualified	Sanctions annulled
32	Galina Skiba (RUS)	Ice hockey	Disqualified	Sanctions partially confirmed
33	Anna Shokhina (RUS)	Ice hockey	Case closed	-
			18 December 2017	
34	Alexey Voevoda (RUS)	Bobsleigh (gold) (gold)	Disqualified	Sanctions partially confirmed
35	Denis Yuskov (RUS)	Speed skating	Case closed	-
			22 December 2017	
36	Ivan Skobrev (RUS)	Speed skating	Disqualified	Sanctions annulled
37	Artem Kuznetcov (RUS)	Speed skating	Disqualified	Sanctions annulled
38	Tatiana Ivanova (RUS)	Luge (silver)	Disqualified	Sanctions annulled
39	Albert Demchenko (RUS)	Luge (silver) (silver)	Disqualified	Sanctions annulled
40	Nikita Kryukov (RUS)	Cross-country skiing (silver)	Disqualified	Sanctions annulled
41	Alexander Bessmertnykh (RUS)	Cross-country skiing (silver)	Disqualified	Sanctions annulled
42	Natalia Matveeva (RUS)	Cross-country skiing	Disqualified	Sanctions annulled
43	Liudmila Udobkina (RUS)	Bobsleigh	Disqualified	Sanctions annulled
44	Maxim Belugin (RUS)	Bobsleigh	Disqualified	Did not appeal to CAS
45	Tatiana Burina (RUS)	Ice hockey	Disqualified	Sanctions annulled
46	Anna Shchukina (RUS)	Ice hockey	Disqualified	Sanctions annulled

On 1 February 2018, the IOC said in a statement that “the result of the CAS decision does not mean that athletes from the group of 28 will be invited to the 2018 Games. Not being sanctioned does not automatically confer the privilege of an invitation” and that “this [case] may have a serious impact on the future fight against doping”. The IOC found it important to note that CAS Secretary General "insisted that the CAS decision does not mean that these 28 athletes are innocent” and that they would consider an appeal against the courts decision. On 9 February 2018, the CAS dismissed 47 appeals from Russian athletes and coaches to the IOC's decision not to invite these athletes and coaches to the 2018 Olympics. On 19 January 2019, the IOC's appeal of Legkov's case was rejected and the organization decided not to proceed with 27 remaining cases because the chance of winning would be very low. The IOC voiced its disappointment with the decision.

=== List of official changes ===
Ruling date	Sport / event	Athlete (NOC)	1st place, gold medalist(s)	2nd place, silver medalist(s)	3rd place, bronze medalist(s)	Total	Comment
List of official changes in medal standings (after the Games)
1 November 2017; 9 November 2017; 22 December 2017	Cross-country skiing Men's 50 kilometre freestyle Men's 4 × 10 kilometre relay Men's team sprint	Alexander Legkov (RUS), Maxim Vylegzhanin (RUS), Alexander Bessmertnykh (RUS), Nikita Kryukov (RUS)	(−1)	(−3)		(−4)	On 1 November 2017, the IOC disqualified cross country skier Alexander Legkov and he was stripped of his gold medal in 50 km mass start and silver medal in relay. On 9 November 2017, the IOC disqualified cross country skier Maxim Vylegzhanin and he was stripped of his two silver medals in 50 km mass start and team sprint (alongside with the stripped silver medal in the relay with Legkov). Alexander Bessmertnykh who won silver medal in relay and Nikita Kryukov who won silver medal in team sprint were disqualified on 22 December 2017.
22 November 2017	Skeleton; Men's event Women's event	Alexander Tretyakov (RUS), Elena Nikitina (RUS)	(−1)		(−1)	(−2)	On 22 November 2017, the IOC disqualified men's gold medallist Alexander Tretyakov and women's bronze medallist Elena Nikitina.
24 November 2017; 27 November 2017; 28 December 2017	Bobsleigh; Two-man; Four-man	Alexandr Zubkov (RUS) DSQ, Alexey Voyevoda (RUS) DSQ, Alexey Negodaylo (RUS), Dmitry Trunenkov (RUS)	–2			−2	On 24 November 2017, the IOC disqualified bobsledder Alexandr Zubkov and he was stripped of his two gold medals. His teammates in four-man bobsled Alexey Negodaylo and Dmitry Trunenkov were disqualified three days later. On 18 December 2017, Zubkov's teammate in two-man bobsled and four-man bobsled, Alexey Voyevoda was also disqualified. Medals were redistributed.
24 November 2017; 27 November 2017; 28 December 2017	Bobsleigh; Two-man; Four-man	team (LAT)	+1	–1	+1	+1	On 24 November 2017, the IOC disqualified bobsledder Alexandr Zubkov and he was stripped of his two gold medals. His teammates in four-man bobsled Alexey Negodaylo and Dmitry Trunenkov were disqualified three days later. On 18 December 2017, Zubkov's teammate in two-man bobsled and four-man bobsled, Alexey Voyevoda was also disqualified. Medals were redistributed.
24 November 2017; 27 November 2017; 28 December 2017	Bobsleigh; Two-man; Four-man	team (SUI)	+1	–1		0	On 24 November 2017, the IOC disqualified bobsledder Alexandr Zubkov and he was stripped of his two gold medals. His teammates in four-man bobsled Alexey Negodaylo and Dmitry Trunenkov were disqualified three days later. On 18 December 2017, Zubkov's teammate in two-man bobsled and four-man bobsled, Alexey Voyevoda was also disqualified. Medals were redistributed.
24 November 2017; 27 November 2017; 28 December 2017	Bobsleigh; Two-man; Four-man	team (USA)		+2	–2	0	On 24 November 2017, the IOC disqualified bobsledder Alexandr Zubkov and he was stripped of his two gold medals. His teammates in four-man bobsled Alexey Negodaylo and Dmitry Trunenkov were disqualified three days later. On 18 December 2017, Zubkov's teammate in two-man bobsled and four-man bobsled, Alexey Voyevoda was also disqualified. Medals were redistributed.
24 November 2017; 27 November 2017; 28 December 2017	Bobsleigh; Two-man; Four-man	team (GBR)			+1	+1	On 24 November 2017, the IOC disqualified bobsledder Alexandr Zubkov and he was stripped of his two gold medals. His teammates in four-man bobsled Alexey Negodaylo and Dmitry Trunenkov were disqualified three days later. On 18 December 2017, Zubkov's teammate in two-man bobsled and four-man bobsled, Alexey Voyevoda was also disqualified. Medals were redistributed.
24 November 2017	Speed skating Women's 500 metres	Olga Fatkulina (RUS)		(–1)		(−1)	On 24 November 2017, the IOC disqualified speedskater Olga Fatkulina and she was stripped of her silver medal.
27 November 2017; 1 December 2017	Biathlon; Women's sprint Women's relay	Olga Vilukhina (RUS), Yana Romanova (RUS), Olga Zaitseva (RUS) DSQ		(–1) –1		(–1) –1	On 27 November 2017, the IOC disqualified biathletes Olga Vilukhina and Yana Romanova, and they were stripped of their relay silver. Vilukhina was also stripped of her silver medal in women's sprint. On 1 December 2017, relay team member Olga Zaitseva was also disqualified. Teammate Ekaterina Shumilova was not disqualified but lost her relay medal as a result. The women's relay medals were reallocated on 19 May 2022.
22 December 2017	Luge; Men's singles Team relay	Albert Demchenko (RUS), Tatiana Ivanova (RUS)		(–2)		(−2)	On 22 December 2017, the IOC disqualified lugers Albert Demchenko and Tatiana Ivanova who won a combined two silver medals.
1 February 2018; 24 September 2020	Cross-country skiing Men's 50 kilometre freestyle Men's team sprint Men's 4 × 10 kilometre relay	Alexander Legkov (RUS), Maxim Vylegzhanin (RUS), Alexander Bessmertnykh (RUS), Nikita Kryukov (RUS)	(+2)	(+7)	(+1)	(+10)	On 1 February 2018, the Court of Arbitration for Sport reinstated the results for medalists Alexander Legkov, Maxim Vylegzhanin, Alexander Bessmertnykh and Nikita Kryukov in cross-country skiing, Aleksander Tretyakov and Elena Nikitina in skeleton, Olga Fatkulina in speed skating, Albert Demchenko and Tatiana Ivanova in luge. Also the CAS removed the sanctions from Alexey Negodaylo and Dmitry Trunenkov in bobsleigh, but upheld them on their teammates Alexandr Zubkov and Alexey Voyevoda. As a result, none received bobsleigh medals. On 24 September 2020, the Court of Arbitration for Sport removed the sanctions from biathletes Olga Vilukhina, Yana Romanova, but upheld them on their teammate Olga Zaitseva. As a result, none received biathlon relay medals.
1 February 2018; 24 September 2020	Skeleton; Men's event Women's event	Aleksander Tretyakov (RUS), Elena Nikitina (RUS)	(+2)	(+7)	(+1)	(+10)	
1 February 2018; 24 September 2020	Speed skating Women's 500 metres	Olga Fatkulina (RUS)	(+2)	(+7)	(+1)	(+10)	
1 February 2018; 24 September 2020	Luge; Men's singles Team relay	Albert Demchenko (RUS), Tatiana Ivanova (RUS)	(+2)	(+7)	(+1)	(+10)	
1 February 2018; 24 September 2020	Bobsleigh; Four-men	Alexey Negodaylo (RUS), Dmitry Trunenkov (RUS)	(+2)	(+7)	(+1)	(+10)	
1 February 2018; 24 September 2020	Biathlon; Women's sprint Women's relay	Olga Vilukhina (RUS), Yana Romanova (RUS)	(+2)	(+7)	(+1)	(+10)	
24 September 2020; 19 May 2022	Biathlon; Women's relay	team (NOR)		+1	−1	0	The medals were reallocated on 19 May 2022.
24 September 2020; 19 May 2022	Biathlon; Women's relay	team (CZE)			+1	+1	The medals were reallocated on 19 May 2022.
15 February 2020	Biathlon; Men's relay	Evgeny Ustyugov (RUS)	−1			−1	IBU decision.
19 September 2025	Biathlon; Men's relay	team (GER)	+1	−1		0	In September 2025 the IOC Executive Board approved these medal reallocations.
19 September 2025	Biathlon; Men's relay	team (AUT)		+1	−1	0	In September 2025 the IOC Executive Board approved these medal reallocations.
19 September 2025	Biathlon; Men's relay	team (NOR)			+1	+1	In September 2025 the IOC Executive Board approved these medal reallocations.

=== List of official changes by country ===
NOC	Gold	Silver	Bronze	Total
Russia	−3	−1		−4
Great Britain			+1	+1
Latvia	+1	–1	+1	+1
Switzerland	+1	–1		0
Germany	+1	–1		0
Austria		+1	–1	0
United States		+2	−2	0
Norway		+1		+1
Czech Republic			+1	+1

== See also ==
- 2014 Winter Paralympics medal table
