= Russia at the Olympics =

- IOC code: RUS
- NOC: Russian Olympic Committee
- Website: www.olympic.ru/en
- Medals Ranked 12th: Gold 192 Silver 163 Bronze 184 Total 539

Summer appearances
- 1996; 2000; 2004; 2008; 2012; 2016; 2020–2024; 2028

Winter appearances
- 1994; 1998; 2002; 2006; 2010; 2014; 2018–2026

Other related appearances
- Russian Empire (1900–1912); Soviet Union (1952–1988); Unified Team (1992); Olympic Athletes from Russia (2018); ROC (2020–2022); Individual Neutral Athletes (2024–2026)

Russia, referred to by its formal name; the Russian Federation, by the International Olympic Committee, has competed at the modern Olympic Games on many occasions, but as different nations in its history. As the Russian Empire, the nation first competed at the 1900 Summer Olympics and returned again in 1908 and 1912. It would be forty years until Russian athletes once again competed at the Olympics, as the Soviet Union at the 1952 Summer Olympics. After the dissolution of the Soviet Union in 1991, Russia competed as part of the Unified Team in 1992, and finally returned once again as Russia at the 1994 Winter Olympics.

The Russian Olympic Committee was created in 1991 and recognized in 1993. The Soviet Union hosted the 1980 Summer Olympics in Moscow, and the Russian Federation hosted the 2014 Winter Olympics in Sochi.

In twelve appearances from 1994 to 2016, Russian athletes won a total of 422 medals at the Summer Olympic Games and another 120 at the Winter Olympic Games. Russia's 542 total medals, including 193 gold medals, are second behind only the United States in that timespan.

In 2017, Russia was suspended from competing at the Olympic Games due to the state-sponsored doping scandal. Russian athletes were allowed to participate in the 2018 Winter Olympics as the Olympic Athletes from Russia (OAR). They were also allowed to compete at the 2020 Summer Olympics and the 2022 Winter Olympics, representing the Russian Olympic Committee (ROC).

Amid the Russian invasion of Ukraine, the International Olympic Committee (IOC) allowed Russian athletes to participate at the 2024 Summer Olympics and 2026 Winter Olympics as Individual Neutral Athletes (AIN). The suspension of the ROC was provisionally lifted in July 2026, before the qualifying events for the 2028 Summer Olympics, with the IOC also stating that a decision on restoring the complete use of the Russia name and its national symbols at the Olympics will later be made "at the appropriate time."

== Hosted Games ==
Russia has hosted the Games on two occasions. Moscow was the host of the 1980 Summer Games, when Russia (Russian SFSR) was part of the Soviet Union. Sochi was the host of the 2014 Winter Games, as part of the Russian Federation.

Games	Host city	Dates	Nations	Participants	Events
1980 Summer Olympics	Moscow, Russian SFSR, Soviet Union	19 July–3 August	80	5,179	203
2014 Winter Olympics	Sochi, Krasnodar Krai, Russian Federation	7–23 February	88	2,873	98

== Participation ==
=== Timeline of participation ===
Olympic Year/s	Teams	
1900–1912	Russian Empire	
1920–1936		
1952–1988	Soviet Union	
1992	Unified Team	
1994–2016	Russia	Belarus
2018	Olympic Athletes from Russia	Belarus
2020–2022	ROC	Belarus
2024–present	Individual Neutral Athletes	

=== Combined medals ===
The Russian Federation, the Russian Empire, the Olympic Athletes from Russia, and the Russian Olympic Committee (ROC) are sometimes combined outside of IOC sources. The Soviet Union is often combined with the post-union team that competed in 1992. Some sources combine the Soviet Union and Russia, despite the fact that many republics which subsequently gained or re-gained independence (Armenia, Azerbaijan, Belarus, Estonia, Georgia, Kazakhstan, Kyrgyzstan, Latvia, Lithuania, Moldova, Tajikistan, Turkmenistan, Ukraine and Uzbekistan) contributed to the medal tally of the USSR, and there are sources that combine all medals of RU1, URS, EUN, OAR, ROC and RUS. On 31 January 1992, the United Nations recognized, without objection, Russia as legal successor of the rights and obligations of the former Soviet Union, but this has no significance in medal tallies.

Neutral Russian athletes that competed as Individual Neutral Athletes (AIN) at the 2024 Summer and the 2026 Winter Olympics are also included in the table.

Medal counts:
Russia combined with precursors and Russian delegations
status after the 2026 Olympics

- Note: Neutral Russian athletes that competed as AIN at the 2024 Summer and the 2026 Winter Olympics are also included in the table.

	Summer Games					Winter Games					Combined total				
Team (IOC code)	No.	1st place, gold medalist(s)	2nd place, silver medalist(s)	3rd place, bronze medalist(s)	Total	No.	1st place, gold medalist(s)	2nd place, silver medalist(s)	3rd place, bronze medalist(s)	Total	No.	1st place, gold medalist(s)	2nd place, silver medalist(s)	3rd place, bronze medalist(s)	Total
Russia	6	147	124	150	421	6	45	39	34	118	12	192	163	184	539
Russian Empire	3	1	4	3	8	0	0	0	0	0	3	1	4	3	8
Soviet Union	9	395	319	296	1010	9	78	57	59	194	18	473	376	355	1204
Unified Team	1	45	38	29	112	1	9	6	8	23	2	54	44	37	135
Olympic Athletes from Russia	0	0	0	0	0	1	2	6	9	17	1	2	6	9	17
ROC	1	20	28	23	71	1	5	12	15	32	2	25	40	38	103
Individual Neutral Athletes	1	0	1	0	1	1	0	1	0	1	2	0	2	0	2
Total	21	608	514	501	1623	19	139	121	125	385	40	747	635	626	2008

== Medal tables ==
=== Medals by Summer Games ===
Games	Athletes	Gold	Silver	Bronze	Total	Rank
1900–1912	as part of the Russian Empire					
1920–1948	did not participate					
1952–1988	as part of the Soviet Union					
(Spain) 1992 Barcelona	as part of the Unified Team					
(United States) 1996 Atlanta	390	26	21	16	63	2
(Australia) 2000 Sydney	435	32	28	29	89	2
(Greece) 2004 Athens	446	28	26	36	90	3
(China) 2008 Beijing	455	24	13	23	60	3
(United Kingdom) 2012 London	436	18	19	26	63	4
(Brazil) 2016 Rio de Janeiro	282	19	17	20	56	4
(Japan) 2020 Tokyo	as the ROC					
(France) 2024 Paris	as part of the Individual Neutral Athletes					
(United States) 2028 Los Angeles	future event					
(Australia) 2032 Brisbane	future event					
Total (6/30)	2,444	147	124	150	421	13

=== Medals by Winter Games ===
Host country

Games	Athletes	Gold	Silver	Bronze	Total	Rank
1956–1988	as part of the Soviet Union					
(France) 1992 Albertville	as part of the Unified Team					
(Norway) 1994 Lillehammer	113	11	8	4	23	1
(Japan) 1998 Nagano	122	9	6	3	18	3
(United States) 2002 Salt Lake City	151	5	4	4	13	5
(Italy) 2006 Turin	190	8	6	8	22	4
(Canada) 2010 Vancouver	177	2	5	6	13	12
(Russia) 2014 Sochi	232	10	10	9	29	2
(South Korea) 2018 Pyeongchang	as the Olympic Athletes from Russia					
(China) 2022 Beijing	as the ROC					
(Italy) 2026 Milano Cortina	as part of the Individual Neutral Athletes					
(France) 2030 French Alps	future event					
(United States) 2034 Utah	future event					
Total (6/25)	985	45	39	34	118	13

=== Medals by summer sport ===
Leading in that sport

Sport	Gold	Silver	Bronze	Total
Wrestling	31	11	14	56
Gymnastics	22	21	21	64
Athletics	18	19	19	56
Fencing	13	5	8	26
Boxing	10	5	15	30
Artistic swimming	10	0	0	10
Shooting	7	13	11	31
Cycling	5	5	9	19
Judo	5	4	7	16
Swimming	4	9	9	22
Diving	4	8	6	18
Weightlifting	4	7	6	17
Modern pentathlon	4	1	0	5
Tennis	3	3	2	8
Canoeing	2	4	7	13
Handball	2	1	1	4
Volleyball	1	3	2	6
Rowing	1	0	2	3
Marathon swimming	1	0	0	1
Taekwondo	0	2	2	4
Water polo	0	1	3	4
Archery	0	1	1	2
Sailing	0	1	1	2
Basketball	0	0	3	3
Badminton	0	0	1	1
Totals (25 entries)	147	124	150	421

=== Medals by winter sport ===
Sport	Gold	Silver	Bronze	Total
Cross country skiing	14	10	9	33
Figure skating	14	9	3	26
Biathlon	8	5	7	20
Speed skating	3	5	5	13
Short track speed skating	3	1	1	5
Snowboarding	2	2	1	5
Skeleton	1	0	2	3
Luge	0	3	0	3
Freestyle skiing	0	1	3	4
Bobsleigh	0	1	1	2
Ice hockey	0	1	1	2
Alpine skiing	0	1	0	1
Nordic combined	0	0	1	1
Totals (13 entries)	45	39	34	118

== Notes ==
- On 9 February 2014, Russia captured the inaugural gold medal in the team figure skating event at the 2014 Sochi Winter Olympics. Yulia Lipnitskaya, at 15, becomes the youngest Russian Winter Olympic medalist.
- On 10 February 2014, Viktor Ahn won the first short track speedskating medal for Russia competing as Russia. He won the bronze medal in the 1500m short track speedskating event at the 2014 Sochi winter Olympics.
- On 15 February 2014, Ahn won the second Russian gold medal in the 1000m short track speedskating event, leading the first Russian 1–2 finish in short track, with Vladimir Grigorev winning silver. At 31 years and 191 days, Grigorev also became the oldest man to win a short track Olympic medal.
- On 20 February 2014, Adelina Sotnikova won the first ever Russian ladies figure skating gold medal.

== Stripped Olympic medals ==
Due to doping violations, Russia has been stripped of 52 Olympic medals – the most of any country, four times the number of the runner-up, and 31% of the global total. It was the leading country in terms of medals removed due to doping at the 2002 Winter Olympics (5 medals), the 2006 Winter Olympics (1 medal), the 2008 Summer Olympics (14 medals), the 2010 Winter Olympics (2 medals), the 2012 Summer Olympics (20 medals), 2014 Winter Olympics (4 medals — 10 others were stripped and subsequently returned), as well as joint-most at the 2004 Summer Olympics (3 medals) and the 2016 Summer Olympics (1 medal). Also two medals were also stripped from Russian teams competing as OAR at the 2018 Winter Olympics (1 medal) and the ROC at the 2022 Winter Olympics (1 medal downgraded from gold → bronze).

Key
†	Denotes medals stripped from Russian teams competing as OAR or ROC

Olympics	#	Athlete	Medal	Event	Ref
2002 Winter Olympics	#1	Olga Danilova	1st place, gold medalist(s)	Cross-country skiing, women's 5 km + 5 km combined pursuit	
2002 Winter Olympics	#2	Olga Danilova	2nd place, silver medalist(s)	Cross-country skiing, women's 10 km classical	
2002 Winter Olympics	#3	Larisa Lazutina	1st place, gold medalist(s)	Cross-country skiing, women's 30 km classical	
2002 Winter Olympics	#4	Larisa Lazutina	2nd place, silver medalist(s)	Cross-country skiing, women's 15 km freestyle	
2002 Winter Olympics	#5	Larisa Lazutina	2nd place, silver medalist(s)	Cross-country skiing, women's 5 km + 5 km combined pursuit	
2004 Summer Olympics	#6	Irina Korzhanenko	1st place, gold medalist(s)	Athletics, women's shot put	
2004 Summer Olympics	#7	Svetlana Krivelyova	3rd place, bronze medalist(s)	Athletics, women's shot put	
2004 Summer Olympics	#8	Oleg Perepetchenov	3rd place, bronze medalist(s)	Weightlifting, men's 77 kg	
2006 Winter Olympics	#9	Olga Pyleva	2nd place, silver medalist(s)	Biathlon, women's individual	
2008 Summer Olympics	#10	Relay team (Yuliya Chermoshanskaya)	1st place, gold medalist(s)	Athletics, women's 4 × 100 m relay	
2008 Summer Olympics	#11	Relay team (Anastasiya Kapachinskaya, Tatyana Firova)	2nd place, silver medalist(s)	Athletics, women's 4 × 400 m relay	
2008 Summer Olympics	#12	Maria Abakumova	2nd place, silver medalist(s)	Athletics, women's javelin throw	
2008 Summer Olympics	#13	Khasan Baroyev	2nd place, silver medalist(s)	Wrestling, men's Greco-Roman 120 kg	
2008 Summer Olympics	#14	Tatyana Lebedeva	2nd place, silver medalist(s)	Athletics, women's triple jump	
2008 Summer Olympics	#15	Tatyana Lebedeva	2nd place, silver medalist(s)	Athletics, women's long jump	
2008 Summer Olympics	#16	Marina Shainova	2nd place, silver medalist(s)	Weightlifting, women's 58 kg	
2008 Summer Olympics	#17	Relay team (Denis Alexeev)	3rd place, bronze medalist(s)	Athletics, men's 4 × 400 m relay	
2008 Summer Olympics	#18	Yekaterina Volkova	3rd place, bronze medalist(s)	Athletics, women's 3000 m steeplechase	
2008 Summer Olympics	#19	Anna Chicherova	3rd place, bronze medalist(s)	Athletics, women's high jump	
2008 Summer Olympics	#20	Khadzhimurat Akkayev	3rd place, bronze medalist(s)	Weightlifting, men's 94 kg	
2008 Summer Olympics	#21	Tatyana Chernova	3rd place, bronze medalist(s)	Athletics, Women's heptathlon	
2008 Summer Olympics	#22	Dmitry Lapikov	3rd place, bronze medalist(s)	Weightlifting, men's 105 kg	
2008 Summer Olympics	#23	Nadezhda Evstyukhina	3rd place, bronze medalist(s)	Weightlifting, women's 75 kg	
2010 Winter Olympics	#24	Evgeny Ustyugov	1st place, gold medalist(s)	Biathlon, Men's mass start	
2010 Winter Olympics	#25	Relay team (Evgeny Ustyugov)	3rd place, bronze medalist(s)	Biathlon, Men's relay	
2012 Summer Olympics	#26	Natalya Antyukh	1st place, gold medalist(s)	Athletics, women's 400 m hurdles	
2012 Summer Olympics	#27	Sergey Kirdyapkin	1st place, gold medalist(s)	Athletics, men's 50 km walk	
2012 Summer Olympics	#28	Elena Lashmanova	1st place, gold medalist(s)	Athletics, Women's 20 km walk	
2012 Summer Olympics	#29	Tatyana Lysenko	1st place, gold medalist(s)	Athletics, women's hammer throw	
2012 Summer Olympics	#30	Ivan Ukhov	1st place, gold medalist(s)	Athletics, Men's high jump	
2012 Summer Olympics	#31	Mariya Savinova	1st place, gold medalist(s)	Athletics, women's 800 m	
2012 Summer Olympics	#32	Yuliya Zaripova	1st place, gold medalist(s)	Athletics, women's 3000 m steeplechase	
2012 Summer Olympics	#33	Apti Aukhadov	2nd place, silver medalist(s)	Weightlifting, men's 85 kg	
2012 Summer Olympics	#34	Aleksandr Ivanov	2nd place, silver medalist(s)	Weightlifting, men's 94 kg	
2012 Summer Olympics	#35	Olga Kaniskina	2nd place, silver medalist(s)	Athletics, women's 20 km walk	
2012 Summer Olympics	#36	Yevgeniya Kolodko	2nd place, silver medalist(s)	Athletics, women's shot put	
2012 Summer Olympics	#37	Darya Pishchalnikova	2nd place, silver medalist(s)	Athletics, women's discus throw	
2012 Summer Olympics	#38	Tatyana Tomashova	2nd place, silver medalist(s)	Athletics, Women's 1500 m	
2012 Summer Olympics	#39	Relay (Antonina Krivoshapka, Yulia Gushchina, Tatyana Firova, Natalya Antyukh)	2nd place, silver medalist(s)	Athletics, women's 4 × 400 m relay	
2012 Summer Olympics	#40	Svetlana Tsarukayeva	2nd place, silver medalist(s)	Weightlifting, women's 63 kg	
2012 Summer Olympics	#41	Natalia Zabolotnaya	2nd place, silver medalist(s)	Weightlifting, women's 75 kg	
2012 Summer Olympics	#42	Tatyana Chernova	3rd place, bronze medalist(s)	Athletics, women's heptathlon	
2012 Summer Olympics	#43	Ekaterina Poistogova	3rd place, bronze medalist(s)	Athletics, women's 800 m	
2012 Summer Olympics	#44	Svetlana Shkolina	3rd place, bronze medalist(s)	Athletics, Women's high jump	
2012 Summer Olympics	#45	Ruslan Albegov	3rd place, bronze medalist(s)	Weightlifting, Men's +105 kg	
2014 Winter Olympics	#46	Alexandr Zubkov, Alexey Voyevoda	1st place, gold medalist(s)	Bobsleigh, Two-man	
2014 Winter Olympics	#47	Alexandr Zubkov, Alexey Negodaylo, Dmitry Trunenkov and Alexey Voyevoda	1st place, gold medalist(s)	Bobsleigh, Four-man	
2014 Winter Olympics	#48	Relay team (Evgeny Ustyugov)	1st place, gold medalist(s)	Biathlon, Men's relay	
2014 Winter Olympics	#49	Relay team (Olga Vilukhina, Yana Romanova, Olga Zaitseva)	2nd place, silver medalist(s)	Biathlon, Women's relay	
2016 Summer Olympics	#50	Mikhail Aloyan	2nd place, silver medalist(s)	Boxing, men's flyweight	
2018 Winter Olympics	#51	Curling team (Aleksandr Krushelnitckii)^{†}	3rd place, bronze medalist(s)	Curling, Mixed doubles	
2022 Winter Olympics	#52	Team event (Mark Kondratiuk, Kamila Valieva, Anastasia Mishina, Aleksandr Galliamov, Victoria Sinitsina, Nikita Katsalapov)^{†}	(gold) → (bronze)	Figure Skating, Team event	

== 2016–2026 suspension ==
Russia was partially banned from participation at the 2016 Summer Olympics due to the state-sponsored doping scandal. Russian athletes were then allowed to participate in the 2018 Winter Olympics as the Olympic Athletes from Russia (OAR), and in both the 2020 Summer Olympics and the 2022 Winter Olympics as the Russian Olympic Committee athletes (ROC).

Amid the Russian invasion of Ukraine, the International Olympic Committee (IOC) announced in January 2023 plans to have Russian athletes introduced as Individual Neutral Athletes (AIN) at the 2024 Summer Olympics. The IOC also published a statement stating that it supported the return of Russian athletes, as long as they did not "actively" advocate for the war and as long as their flag, anthem, colors, and organizations were excluded (thus preventing them from competing under the Russian Olympic Committee as in 2020 and 2022). However, they could not compete in team events. With the Russo-Ukrainian war extending into 2026, Russian athletes were also introduced as Individual Neutral Athletes at the 2026 Winter Olympics under the same rules used in 2024. In July 2026, the IOC provisionally lifted the suspension of the ROC, in time for Russian athletes to potentially take part in qualifying events for the 2028 Summer Olympics, and stated that it will make the decision on the display of Russian national symbols at the Olympics "at the appropriate time."

== Flag bearers ==
- 1994 Lillehammer – Sergei Tchepikov
- 1996 Atlanta – Aleksandr Karelin
- 1998 Nagano – Alexey Prokurorov
- 2000 Sydney – Andrey Lavrov
- 2002 Salt Lake City – Alexey Prokurorov
- 2004 Athens – Alexander Popov
- 2006 Turin – Dmitry Dorofeyev
- 2008 Beijing – Andrei Kirilenko
- 2010 Vancouver – Aleksey Morozov
- 2012 London – Maria Sharapova
- 2014 Sochi – Alexander Zubkov
- 2016 Rio de Janeiro – Sergey Tetyukhin

== See also ==
- Category:Olympic competitors for Russia
- Russia at the Paralympics
- Russia at the Youth Olympics
- Russian Empire at the Olympics
- Soviet Union at the Olympics & Unified Team at the Olympics
- Doping in Russia
- Icarus (2017 film)
