= List of flag bearers for Russia at the Olympics =

Russia at the Olympics
- IOC code: RUS
- NOC: Russian Olympic Committee
- Website: www.olympic.ru (in Russian)
- Medals: Gold 195 Silver 165 Bronze 187 Total 547

Summer appearances
- 1996; 2000; 2004; 2008; 2012; 2016; 2020–2024

Winter appearances
- 1994; 1998; 2002; 2006; 2010; 2014; 2018–2022; 2026

Other related appearances
- Russian Empire (1900–1912); Soviet Union (1952–1988); Unified Team (1992); Olympic Athletes from Russia (2018); ROC (2020–2022); Individual Neutral Athletes (2024)

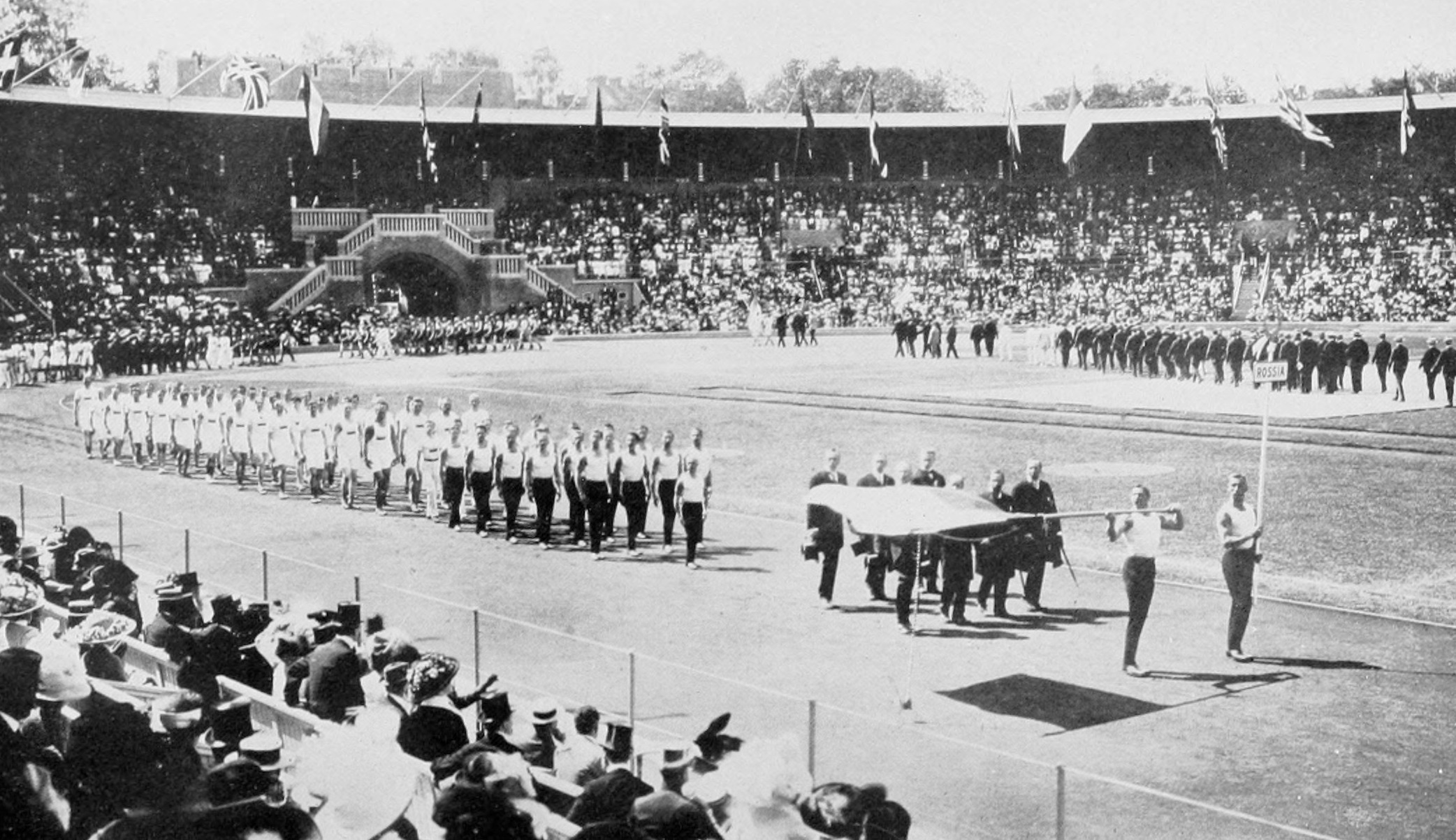
Russia at the 1912 Summer Olympics

This is a list of flag bearers who have represented Russia at the Olympics.

Flag bearers carry the national flag of their country at the opening ceremony of the Olympic Games.

#	Event year	Season	Flag bearer	Sport
1	1912	Summer	M. E. Rayevsky	Gymnastics
2	1994	Winter	Sergei Tchepikov	Biathlon
3	1996	Summer	Aleksandr Karelin	Greco-Roman wrestling
4	1998	Winter	Aleksey Prokurorov	Cross-country skiing
5	2000	Summer	Andrey Lavrov	Handball
6	2002	Winter	Aleksey Prokurorov	Cross-country skiing
7	2004	Summer	Aleksandr Popov	Swimming
8	2006	Winter	Dmitry Dorofeyev	Speed skating
9	2008	Summer	Andrei Kirilenko	Basketball
10	2010	Winter	Aleksey Morozov	Ice hockey
11	2012	Summer	Maria Sharapova	Tennis
12	2014	Winter	Alexandr Zubkov	Bobsleigh
13	2016	Summer	Sergey Tetyukhin	Volleyball

== See also ==
- Russia at the Olympics
