= Michael Lucas =

Michael Lucas may refer to:

- Michael Lucas, 2nd Baron Lucas of Chilworth (1926–2001), British peer and Conservative politician
- Michael Lucas (political activist) (1926—2020), artist, designer, and political activist
- Mike Lucas (cricketer) (born 1944), Australian cricketer
- Mike Lucas (born 1959), football coach
- Michael Lucas (director) (born 1972), performer in and director of gay pornographic films
- Michael Lucas (Australian filmmaker), Australian screenwriter and producer, writer of TV series The Newsreader (2021)

== See also ==
- Michael Lukas (born 1983), Swiss bobsledder
- Michael David Lukas (born 1979), author
