= Sandra Kiriasis =

German bobsledder (born 1975)

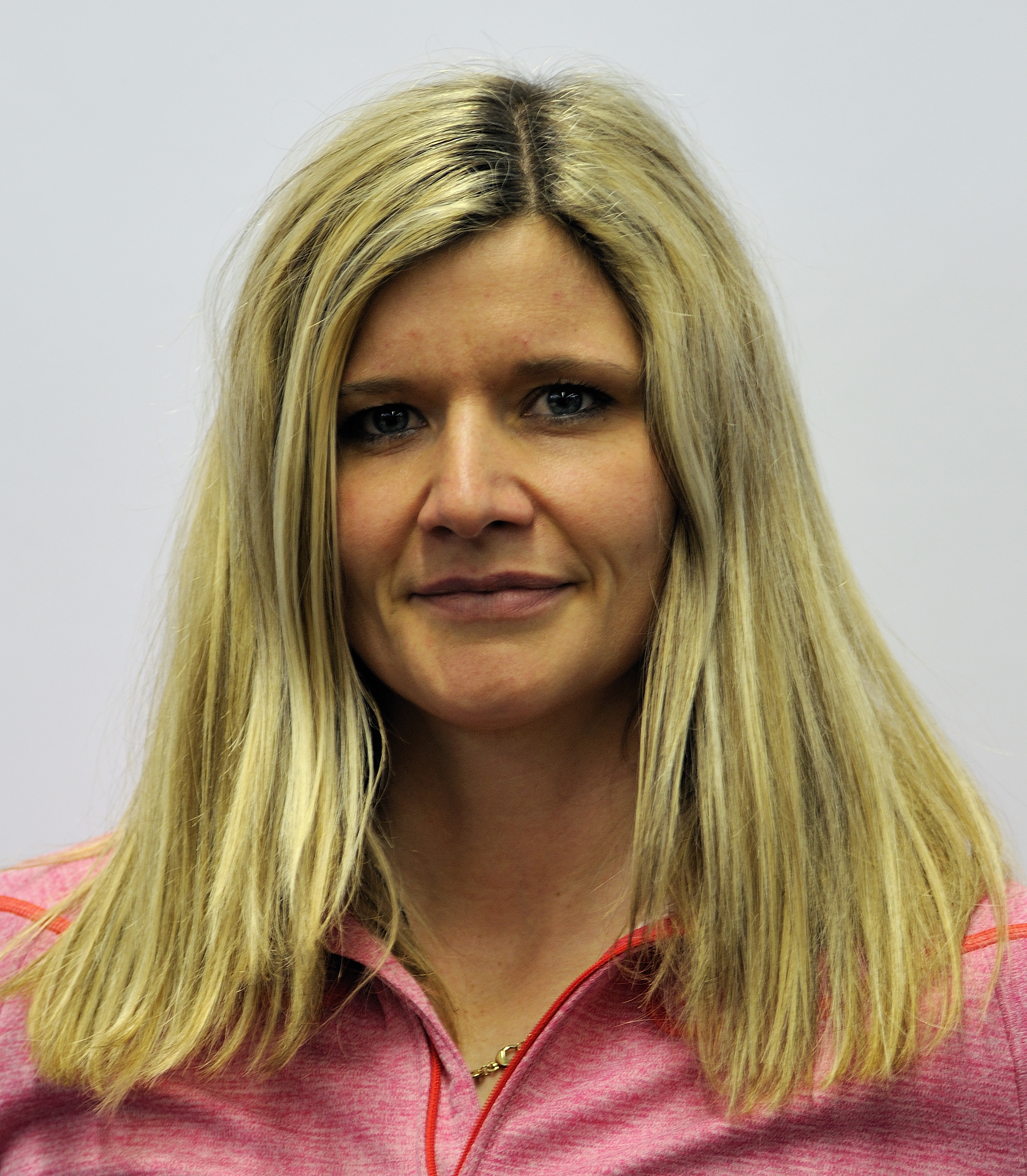

Personal information
- Nationality: German
- Born: 4 January 1975 (age 51) Dresden, East Germany
- Height: 1.82 m (6 ft 0 in)
- Weight: 81 kg (179 lb)

Sport
- Country: Germany
- Sport: Bobsleigh
- Event: 2-woman
- Club: RSG Hochsauerland
- Retired: 2014

Achievements and titles
- Olympic finals: 1st place, gold medalist(s) 2nd place, silver medalist(s)
Medal record
Women's bobsleigh
Representing Germany
Olympic Games
Gold medal – first place	2006 Turin	Two-woman
Silver medal – second place	2002 Salt Lake City	Two-woman
World Championships
Gold medal – first place	2005 Calgary	Two-woman
Gold medal – first place	2007 St. Moritz	Two-woman
Gold medal – first place	2007 St. Moritz	Mixed team
Gold medal – first place	2008 Altenberg	Two-woman
Gold medal – first place	2008 Altenberg	Mixed team
Gold medal – first place	2009 Lake Placid	Mixed team
Gold medal – first place	2011 Königssee	Mixed team
Silver medal – second place	2003 Winterberg	Two-woman
Silver medal – second place	2004 Königssee	Two-woman
Silver medal – second place	2012 Lake Placid	Two-woman
Silver medal – second place	2012 Lake Placid	Mixed team
Silver medal – second place	2013 St. Moritz	Mixed team
Bronze medal – third place	2013 St. Moritz	Two-woman
World Cup Championships
Gold medal – first place	2003–04	Two-woman
Gold medal – first place	2004–05	Two-woman
Gold medal – first place	2005–06	Two-woman
Gold medal – first place	2006–07	Two-woman
Gold medal – first place	2007–08	Two-woman
Gold medal – first place	2008–09	Two-woman
Gold medal – first place	2009–10	Two-woman
Gold medal – first place	2010–11	Two-woman
Silver medal – second place	2000–01	Two-woman
Silver medal – second place	2001–02	Two-woman
Silver medal – second place	2002–03	Two-woman
Silver medal – second place	2013-13	Two-woman
Bronze medal – third place	2011–12	Two-woman
European Championships
Gold medal – first place	2006 St. Moritz	Two-woman
Gold medal – first place	2007 Cortina d'Ampezzo	Two-woman
Gold medal – first place	2008 Cesana	Two-woman
Gold medal – first place	2009 St. Moritz	Two-woman
Gold medal – first place	2011 Winterberg	Two-woman
Gold medal – first place	2013 Innsbruck-Igls	Two-woman
Silver medal – second place	2005 Altenberg	Two-woman
Silver medal – second place	2012 Altenberg	Two-woman
Silver medal – second place	2014 Königgsee	Two-woman
Bronze medal – third place	2010 Innsbruck-Igls	Two-woman

Sandra Kiriasis (née Prokoff; born 4 January 1975 in Dresden) is a German former bobsledder who has competed from 2000 to 2014.

At the 2002 Winter Olympics in Salt Lake City she won silver in the two-woman event together with teammate Ulrike Holzner. She also competed in the bobsleigh events at the 2006 Winter Olympics in Turin, where Kiriasis (married in late 2004) won gold in the two-woman event with teammate Anja Schneiderheinze. She finished fourth in the two-woman event at the 2010 Winter Olympics in Vancouver.

Kiriasis also won eight medals at the FIBT World Championships with five golds (Two-woman: 2005, 2007, 2008; Mixed team: 2007, 2008, 2009) and two silvers (Two-woman: 2003, 2004). She won the overall two-woman Bobsleigh World Cup in 2003-4, 2004–5, 2005–6, 2006-7, 2007-8, 2008-9, 2009–10, 2010–11 and won a record 43 World Cup races in total.

Kiriasis retired from the sport after the 2014 Winter Olympics. In July 2014 Kiriasis joined basketball team Nürnberger BC as a fitness coach. In 2017 she was appointed as driving coach for the Jamaican women's bobsleigh team ahead of the 2018 Winter Olympics in Pyeongchang, South Korea, helping them to qualify for the Olympics for the first time. However, she parted company with the Jamaica Bobsleigh Federation days ahead of the start of bobsleigh training at the Games after she was told she would be demoted from her position as driver coach to the role of track and performance analyst.

== Career highlights ==
Olympic Winter Games
2002 – Salt Lake City, (silver) 2nd with Ulrike Holzner
2006 – Turin, (gold) 1st with Anja Schneiderheinze
2018 – PyeongChang, Former coach of the women's Jamaican bobsled team.
World Championships
2003 – Winterberg, (silver) 2nd with Ulrike Holzner
2004 – Königssee, (silver) 2nd with Anja Schneiderheinze
2005 – Calgary, (gold) 1st with Anja Schneiderheinze
2007 – St. Moritz, (gold) 1st with Romy Logsch
2008 – Altenberg, (gold) 1st with Romy Logsch
European Championships
2005 – Altenberg, (silver) 2nd with Anja Schneiderheinze
2006 – St. Moritz, (gold) 1st with Berit Wiacker
2007 – Cortina d'Ampezzo, (gold) 1st with Romy Logsch
2008 – Cesana, (gold) 1st with Berit Wiacker
2009 – St. Moritz, (gold) 1st with Berit Wiacker
World Cup Single Events
2000/2001 – Winterberg, (silver) 2nd with Daniela Clobes
2000/2001 – Winterberg, (bronze) 3rd with Daniela Clobes
2000/2001 – Igls, (silver) 2nd with Kerstin Szymkowiak
2000/2001 – Igls, (silver) 2nd with Kerstin Szymkowiak
2000/2001 – Park City, (gold) 1st with Ulrike Holzner
2001/2002 – Winterberg, (gold) 1st with Ulrike Holzner
2001/2002 – Winterberg, (gold) 1st with Ulrike Holzner
2001/2002 – Königssee, (gold) 1st with Nicole Herschmann
2001/2002 – Igls, (gold) 1st with Ulrike Holzner
2001/2002 – Igls, (gold) 1st with Nicole Herschmann
2001/2002 – Calgary, (bronze) 3rd with Ulrike Holzner
2001/2002 – Calgary, (bronze) 3rd with Ulrike Holzner
2002/2003 – Calgary, (silver) 2nd with Ulrike Holzner
2002/2003 – Calgary, (gold) 1st with Ulrike Holzner
2002/2003 – Park City, (gold) 1st with Nicole Herschmann
2002/2003 – Park City, (gold) 1st with Ulrike Holzner
2002/2003 – Lake Placid, (gold) 1st with Ulrike Holzner
2002/2003 – Lake Placid, (gold) 1st with Nicole Herschmann
2002/2003 – Igls, (silver) 2nd with Nicole Herschmann
2002/2003 – Igls, (silver) 2nd with Ulrike Holzner
2003/2004 – Calgary, (gold) 1st with Anja Schneiderheinze
2003/2004 – Calgary, (gold) 1st with Janine Tischer
2003/2004 – Lake Placid, (gold) 1st with Anja Schneiderheinze
2003/2004 – Lake Placid, (silver) 2nd with Janine Tischer
2003/2004 – Lillehammer, (gold) 1st with Anja Schneiderheinze
2003/2004 – Lillehammer, (gold) 1st with Berit Wiacker
2004/2005 – Winterberg, (gold) 1st with Anja Schneiderheinze
2004/2005 – Altenberg, (silver) 2nd with Anja Schneiderheinze
2004/2005 – Igls, (gold) 1st with Berit Wiacker
2004/2005 – Cortina d'Ampezzo, (gold) 1st with Berit Wiacker
2004/2005 – Cesana, (gold) 1st with Berit Wiacker
2004/2005 – Lake Placid, (gold) 1st with Anja Schneiderheinze
2005/2006 – Calgary, (gold) 1st with Anja Schneiderheinze
2005/2006 – Lake Placid, (gold) 1st with Anja Schneiderheinze
2005/2006 – Igls, (gold) 1st with Berit Wiacker
2005/2006 – Cortina d'Ampezzo, (gold) 1st with Anja Schneiderheinze
2005/2006 – Königssee, (bronze) 3rd with Anja Schneiderheinze
2005/2006 – St. Moritz, (silver) 2nd with Berit Wiacker
2006/2007 – Calgary, (bronze) 3rd with Romy Logsch
2006/2007 – Lake Placid, (bronze) 3rd with Anja Schneiderheinze
2006/2007 – Cortina d'Ampezzo, (gold) 1st with Romy Logsch
2006/2007 – Igls, (gold) 1st with Anja Schneiderheinze
2006/2007 – Cesana, (gold) 1st with Anja Schneiderheinze
2006/2007 – Winterberg, (gold) 1st with Romy Logsch
2006/2007 – Königssee, (gold) 1st with Berit Wiacker
2007/2008 – Calgary, (bronze) 3rd with Berit Wiacker
2007/2008 – Park City, (gold) 1st with Romy Logsch
2007/2008 – Lake Placid, (gold) 1st with Romy Logsch
2007/2008 – Cortina d'Ampezzo, (gold) 1st with Romy Logsch
2007/2008 – Cesana, (bronze) 3rd with Berit Wiacker
2007/2008 – St. Moritz, (gold) 1st with Romy Logsch
2007/2008 – Königssee, (silver) 2nd with Berit Wiacker
2007/2008 – Winterberg, (gold) 1st with Berit Wiacker
2008/2009 – Winterberg, (silver) 2nd with Romy Logsch
2008/2009 – Altenberg, (gold) 1st with Berit Wiacker
2008/2009 – Igls, (bronze) 3rd with Romy Logsch
2008/2009 – Königssee, (silver) 2nd with Romy Logsch
2008/2009 – St. Moritz, (gold) 1st with Berit Wiacker
2008/2009 – St. Moritz, (gold) 1st with Berit Wiacker
2008/2009 – Park City, (bronze) 3rd with Patricia Polifka
