= Janeshia Adams-Ginyard =

American entertainment personality

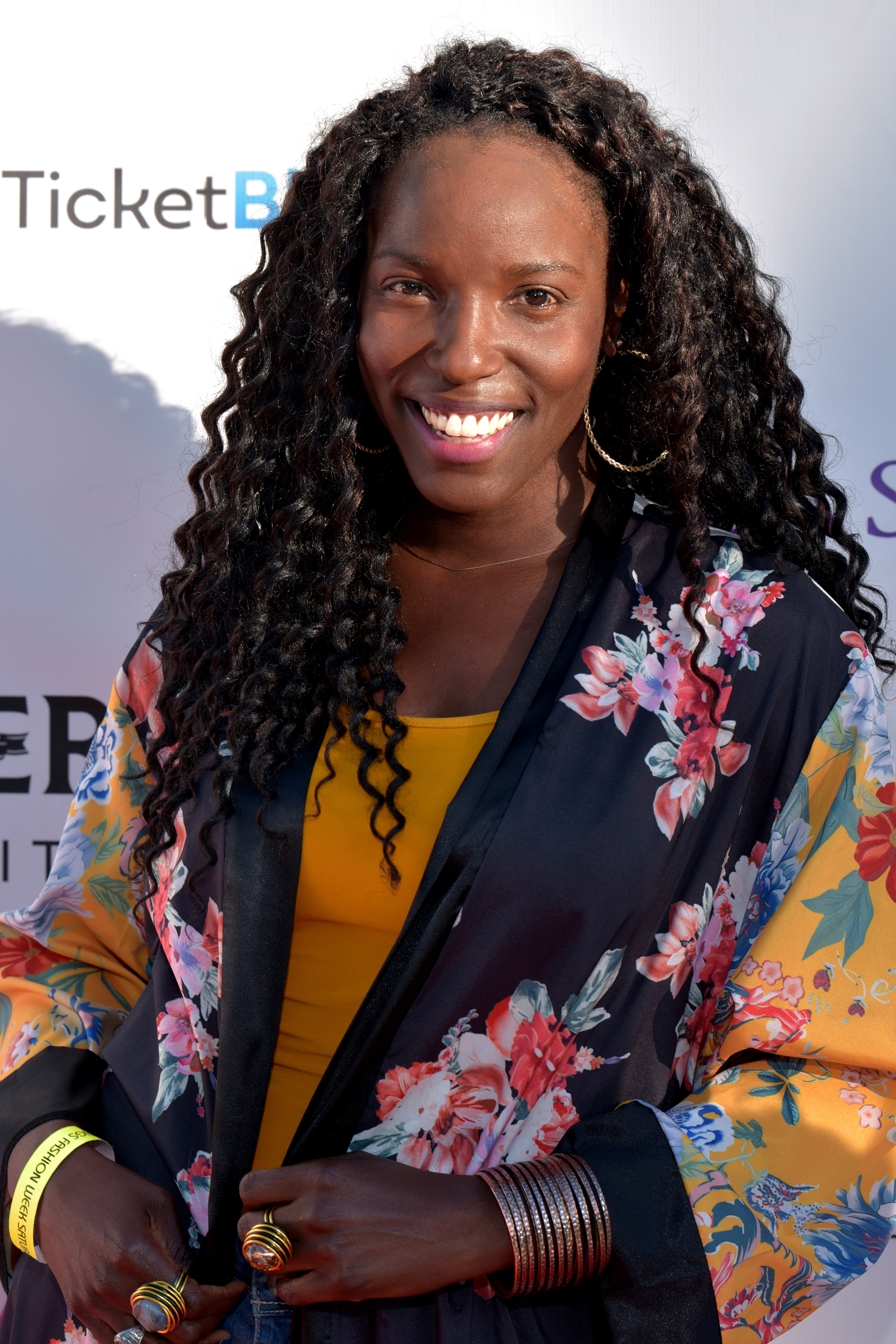
- Adams-Ginyard at the Palm Springs Fashion Week April 2019
- Born: February 14, 1984 (age 42); Los Angeles, California, U.S.
- Education: University of California, Berkeley (BA)
- Occupations: Actress, stuntwoman, professional wrestler
- Years active: 2009–present

Janeshia Adams-Ginyard (born February 14, 1984) is an American actress, stunt woman and professional wrestler. She is best known for her role as Nomble, one of the Dora Milaje, in the Marvel Cinematic Universe film Black Panther and the Disney+ series The Falcon and the Winter Soldier, and her work as a stunt woman on both Black Panther and Avengers: Infinity War.

== Early life ==
Adams-Ginyard was born in Los Angeles, California. She has two siblings, a brother and a twin sister. She is of Jamaican descent.

She attended Gahr High School in Cerritos, California, where she was a noted athlete. She holds multiple records in athletics, including 300 metres hurdles, heptathlon, and as part of the 4 x 100 metres relay and 4 x 400 metres relay. She also played volleyball. During her senior year, she was the California Interscholastic Federation 300 metres hurdles champion. After graduating, she attended the University of California, Berkeley. At UC Berkeley, she studied linguistics and African-American studies, with an emphasis on Caribbean culture, and graduated with a Bachelor's degree. She is fluent in American sign language. She is the CEO of Hyphy 4 Christ, Inc., a faith-based organization.

== Sports ==
Between 2006 and 2007, she was a member of the U.S. National Bobsled team as a brakeman. She and Jamia Jackson were the first all African-American female team. Beginning in 2012, Adams-Ginyard hosted the LA Talk Live Radio Show, Lady J's Wild World of Sports. In 2012, she began her professional wrestling career with WOW! Women of Wrestling, under the ring name FROST The Olympian, based on her real-life experience as a bobsledder.

== Acting and stunt career ==
In preparation for a career as a stunt performer, Adams-Ginyard studied taekwondo and gymnastics. She also gained experience on film sets by working as an extra.

She began working as a stunt performer in 2010, and went on to perform stunts for television programs, including The Mindy Project, K.C. Undercover, True Blood and American Horror Story. Adams-Ginyard appeared in the 2018 film Black Panther as a member of the Dora Milaje. She also worked as a stunt performer for the film, and another Marvel Cinematic Universe film, Avengers: Infinity War, as the stunt double for Danai Gurira. She worked as a stunt performer on 9-1-1 and Godzilla: King of the Monsters, and Us.

She has also appeared in commercials for Nike and Toyota, and was featured in a Lexus advertisement at the Super Bowl in 2018. The stunt performers for Black Panther won Outstanding Action Performance by a Stunt Ensemble in a Motion Picture at the Screen Actors Guild Awards in 2019.

On July 13, 2021, it was announced that Janeshia was nominated for a Primetime Emmy Award in the new category of Outstanding Stunt Performance for her work on the HBO series, Lovecraft Country. And on November 10, 2021, she became a Member of the SAG-AFTRA National Stunt Committee.

== Selected filmography ==
Acting roles
Year	Title	Role	Notes
2009	I'm Alive	Sgt. Monique Munro-Harris	TV series
2013	Women of Wrestling	Frost	TV series
2015	Coaching Bad		TV series
2018	Black Panther	Nomble	
2018	Station 19	Tactical Commander	TV series
2020	Corporate Lives and House Wives	Monica	
2021	The Falcon and the Winter Soldier	Nomble	TV series
2022	Black Panther: Wakanda Forever	Nomble	
2023	South Park: Joining the Panderverse	Panderverse Eric Cartman, additional voices (voice)	TV film

Stunt roles
Year	Title	Notes
2011	Black Gold	
2011	Contagion	
2013	Justified	
2014	True Blood	
2014	Hawaii Five-0	
2015	Gamer's Guide to Pretty Much Everything	
2016	Shameless	
2016	K.C. Undercover	
2016	Broad City	
2016	Teen Wolf	
2017	Fear the Walking Dead	
2017	The Mindy Project	
2018	Black Panther	
2018	Avengers: Infinity War	
2018	Insecure	
2018	American Horror Story	
2018	NCIS: Los Angeles	
2018	The Rookie	
2018	9-1-1	
2019	I Am the Night	
2019	Us	
2019	Godzilla: King of the Monsters	
2019	Dolemite Is My Name	
