= Alexander Ushakov =

Alexander Ushakov may refer to:

- Alexander Ushakov (biathlete) (born 1948), former Soviet biathlete
- Alexander Ushakov (bobsledder) (born 1979), Russian bobsledder
