= Wipplinger =

Wipplinger is a German surname and may refer to the following people:

- Johannes Wipplinger (born 1978), Austrian bobsledder
- Julia Wipplinger (1923–20??), South African tennis player
- Leopold Wipplinger, Austrian politician
- Hans-Peter Wipplinger (born 1968), German artist
- Franz Wipplinger (1760–1812), German artist
