= Nathan Cross =

Canadian bobsledder

Medal record

Bobsleigh

World Championships
Silver medal – second place	2008 Altenberg	Mixed team

Nathan Cross (born December 2, 1980) is a Canadian bobsledder who has competed since 2007. He won the silver medal in the mixed bobsleigh-skeleton team event at the 2008 FIBT World Championships in Altenberg, Germany.
