= Maria Spirescu =

Romanian bobsledder

Personal information
- Nationality: Romanian
- Born: 2 April 1980 (age 44); Miercurea Ciuc, Romania

Sport
- Sport: Bobsleigh

Maria Spirescu (born 2 April 1980) is a Romanian bobsledder. She competed in the two woman event at the 2002 Winter Olympics.
