= Paula McKenzie =

Canadian bobsledder

Personal information
- Born: 4 July 1970 (age 55) Brooks, Alberta, Canada

Sport
- Sport: Bobsleigh

Paula McKenzie (born 4 July 1970) is a Canadian bobsledder. She competed in the two woman event at the 2002 Winter Olympics.
