= Ildikó Strehli =

Hungarian bobsledder

Ildikó Stréhli
Personal information
- Nationality: Hungarian
- Born: 15 July 1965 (age 59); Dorog, Hungary

Sport
- Sport: Bobsleigh

Ildikó Stréhli (born 15 July 1965) is a Hungarian bobsledder. She competed in the two woman event at the 2002 Winter Olympics.
