= Bobsleigh at the 2002 Winter Olympics – Two-woman =

Two-woman at the XIX Olympic Winter Games
- Pictogram for bobsleigh
- Venue: Park City
- Dates: February 19, 2002
- Competitors: 30 from 11 nations
- Winning time: 1:37.76

Medalists
1st place, gold medalist(s)		United States; Jill Bakken, Vonetta Flowers
2nd place, silver medalist(s)		Germany; Sandra Prokoff, Ulrike Holzner
3rd place, bronze medalist(s)		Germany; Susi Erdmann, Nicole Herschmann

The Women's two-woman bobsleigh competition at the 2002 Winter Olympics in Salt Lake City, United States was held on 19 February, at Park City. The event was contested for the first time in Olympic history.

== Results ==
Each of the 15 two-woman teams entered for the event completed both runs.

Rank	Country	Athletes	Run 1	Run 2	Total
Gold medal	United States (USA-2)	Jill Bakken; Vonetta Flowers	48.81	48.95	1:37.76
Silver medal	Germany (GER-1)	Sandra Prokoff; Ulrike Holzner	49.10	48.96	1:38.06
Bronze medal	Germany (GER-2)	Susi Erdmann; Nicole Herschmann	49.19	49.10	1:38.29
4	Switzerland	Françoise Burdet; Katharina Sutter	49.28	49.06	1:38.34
5	United States (USA-1)	Jean Racine; Gea Johnson	49.31	49.42	1:38.73
6	Netherlands (NED-1)	Eline Jurg; Nannet Kiemel	49.64	49.54	1:39.18
7	Italy	Gerda Weissensteiner; Antonella Bellutti	49.66	49.55	1:39.21
8	Russia	Viktoria Tokovaya; Kristina Bader	49.72	49.55	1:39.27
9	Canada	Christina Smith; Paula McKenzie	49.60	49.75	1:39.35
10	Netherlands (NED-2)	Ilse Broeders; Jeanette Pennings	49.70	49.67	1:39.37
11	Great Britain (GBR-2)	Michelle Coy; Jackie Davies	49.77	49.78	1:39.55
12	Great Britain (GBR-1)	Cheryl Done; Nicola Gautier	50.10	49.79	1:39.89
13	Hungary	Ildikó Strehli; Éva Kürti	49.99	49.92	1:39.91
14	Sweden	Karin Olsson; Lina Engren	50.37	49.93	1:40.30
15	Romania	Erika Kovacs; Maria Spirescu	50.12	50.62	1:40.74
