= Erika Kovacs =

Romanian bobsledder

Personal information
- Nationality: Romanian
- Born: 18 May 1973 (age 51); Miercurea Ciuc, Romania

Sport
- Sport: Bobsleigh

Erika Kovacs (born 18 May 1973) is a Romanian bobsledder. She competed in the two woman event at the 2002 Winter Olympics.
