= Ulrike Holzner =

German former athlete and bobsledder (born 1968)

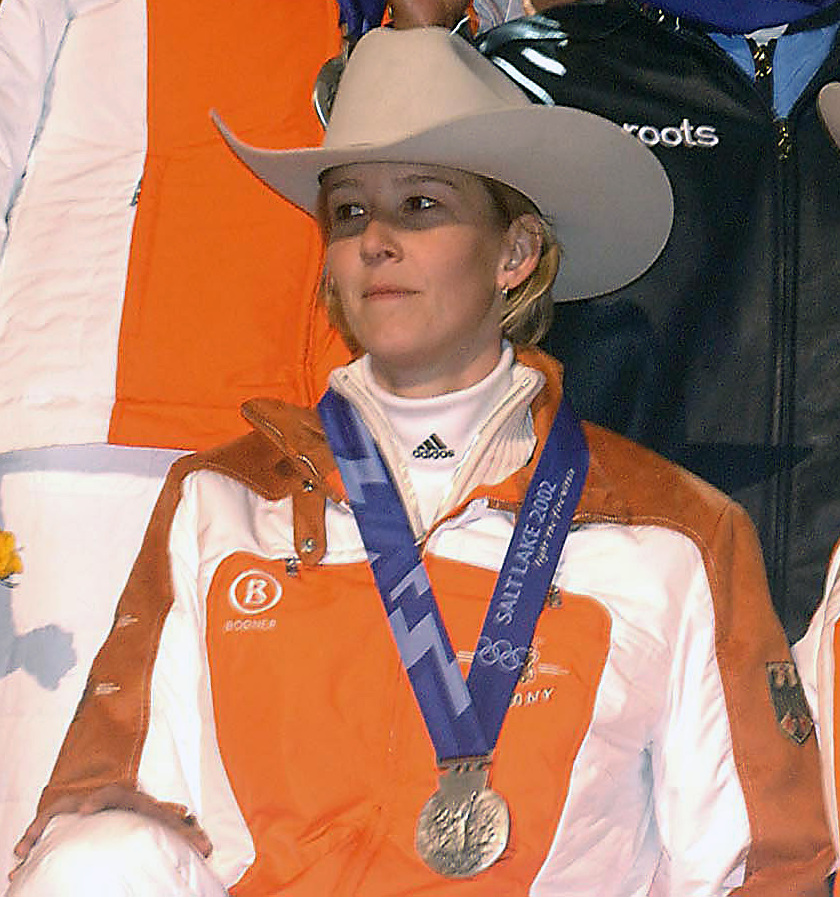
- Holzner at the 2002 Winter Olympics

Personal information
- Born: 18 September 1968 (age 58) Mainz, Rhineland-Palatinate, West Germany

Sport
- Country: Germany
- Sport: Bobsleigh
- Event: Two-woman

Achievements and titles
- Olympic finals: 2nd place, silver medalist(s)
Medal record
Women's Bobsleigh
Representing Germany
Olympic Games
| Silver medal – second place | 2002 Salt Lake City | Two-woman |
World Championships
| Silver medal – second place | 2003 Winterberg | Two-woman |

Ulrike Holzner (born on 18 September 1968 in Mainz, Rhineland-Palatinate) is a German former athlete and bobsledder who switched to the latter event in the early 2000s. She won a silver medal in the two-woman event with teammate Sandra Prokoff at the 2002 Winter Olympics in Salt Lake City.

Holzner also won a silver medal in the two-woman event at the 2003 FIBT World Championships in Winterberg.
