= Nannet Kiemel =

Dutch bobsledder

Personal information
- Nationality: Dutch
- Born: 4 June 1969 (age 55); Deventer, Netherlands

Sport
- Sport: Bobsleigh

Nannet Kiemel (born 4 June 1969) is a Dutch bobsledder. She competed in the two woman event at the 2002 Winter Olympics.
