= Lina Engren =

Swedish bobsledder

Personal information
- Nationality: Swedish
- Born: 13 February 1977 (age 48) Stockholm, Sweden

Sport
- Sport: Bobsleigh

Lina Engren (born 13 February 1977) is a Swedish bobsledder. She competed in the two woman event at the 2002 Winter Olympics.
