= Cheryl Done =

British bobsledder

Personal information
- Nationality: British
- Born: 25 September 1970 (age 55) Bucklow, England

Sport
- Sport: Bobsleigh

Cheryl Done (born 25 September 1970) is a British bobsledder. She competed in the two woman event at the 2002 Winter Olympics.

== Biography ==
Done was born in Bucklow, Cheshire in 1970, before moving to Timperley, and later to Bath. In 1985, at the under-15 level, Done set a new British record in the pentathlon. Done worked for the Royal Air Force (RAF) as an instructor in physical education, and started competing in bobsleigh in 1995. In one of her earliest races for the British team, in St. Moritz, Done crashed and suffered a concussion.

In the two-woman event at the 2002 Winter Olympics, Done and team-mate Nicola Minichiello finished in twelfth place. In 2009, Done was involved in training teenagers who had hopes of competing at a future Winter Olympics. Following the 2012 Summer Olympics in London, Done returned to her duties in the RAF.
