= Christina Smith (bobsleigh) =

Canadian bobsledder

Personal information
- Born: 25 December 1968 (age 57) Montreal, Quebec, Canada

Sport
- Sport: Bobsleigh

Christina Smith (born 25 December 1968) is a Canadian bobsledder. She competed in the two woman event at the 2002 Winter Olympics. As of 2023, she is part of the Enhanced Games athletes advisory commission.
