= Russian Olympic Committee athletes at the Olympics =

ROC at the Olympics
- Flag of the Russian Olympic Committee
- IOC code: ROC
- NOC: Russian Olympic Committee
- Medals Ranked 43rd: Gold 25 Silver 40 Bronze 38 Total 103

Summer appearances
- 2020

Winter appearances
- 2022

Other related appearances
- Russian Empire (1900–1912); Soviet Union (1952–1988); Unified Team (1992); Russia (1994–2016); Olympic Athletes from Russia (2018); Individual Neutral Athletes (2024–2026)

After the Russian doping scandal, athletes from Russia were unable to perform under their own flag and anthem and to use the country's name during several Summer and Winter Olympic Games. Despite the same initial reason for these sanctions, during this period Russian athletes competed at various Olympiads under different names. In 2017, the Russian Olympic Committee was suspended for the 2018 Winter Olympics, Russian government officials were barred from the Games, and individual Russian athletes were allowed to compete neutrally under the Olympic flag and anthem as Olympic Athletes from Russia (OAR). In 2018, the Russian Olympic Committee was reinstated, but because of the outcome of a decision by the World Anti-Doping Agency (WADA) and the subsequent decision of the Court of Arbitration for Sport (CAS), Russian athletes participated at the 2020 Summer Games and 2022 Winter Games under the flag of the Russian Olympic Committee and the acronym "ROC", using fragments of Pyotr Tchaikovsky's Piano Concerto No. 1 as an anthem.

Sources outside the IOC may group the performances of "OAR" and "ROC" at the Olympics, considering them as performances of the same team in the context of a single reason for the appearance of this team.

== Timeline of participation ==
Olympic Year/s	Teams	
1900–1912	Russian Empire	
1920–1936		
1952–1988	Soviet Union	
1992	Unified Team	
1994–2016	Russia	Belarus
2018	Olympic Athletes from Russia	Belarus
2020–2022	ROC	Belarus
2024–present	Individual Neutral Athletes	

== Medal tables ==
=== Medals by Summer Games ===
Games	Athletes	Gold	Silver	Bronze	Total	Rank
(Japan) 2020 Tokyo	335	20	28	23	71	5
Total		20	28	23	71	45

=== Medals by Winter Games ===
Games	Athletes	Gold	Silver	Bronze	Total	Rank
(China) 2022 Beijing	212	5	12	15 (Note: On 29 January 2024, the Court of Arbitration for Sport (CAS) disqualified figure skater Kamila Valieva for four years retroactive to 25 December 2021 for an anti-doping rule violation. On 30 January 2024, the International Skating Union (ISU) reallocated medals to upgrade the United States to gold and Japan to silver, while downgrading the ROC to bronze.)	32	9
Total		5	12	15	32	25

=== Medals by summer sport ===
Sport	Gold	Silver	Bronze	Total
Wrestling	4	0	4	8
Fencing	3	4	1	8
Gymnastics	2	4	4	10
Shooting	2	4	2	8
Swimming	2	2	1	5
Taekwondo	2	1	1	4
Artistic swimming	2	0	0	2
Tennis	1	2	0	3
Boxing	1	1	4	6
Athletics	1	1	0	2
3x3 basketball	0	2	0	2
Archery	0	2	0	2
Rowing	0	2	0	2
Beach volleyball	0	1	0	1
Handball	0	1	0	1
Volleyball	0	1	0	1
Judo	0	0	3	3
Cycling	0	0	2	2
Diving	0	0	1	1
Totals (19 entries)	20	28	23	71

=== Medals by winter sport ===
Sport	Gold	Silver	Bronze	Total
Cross country skiing	4	4	3	11
Figure skating	1	3	2	6
Biathlon	0	1	3	4
Short track speed skating	0	1	1	2
Speed skating	0	1	1	2
Ice hockey	0	1	0	1
Ski jumping	0	1	0	1
Freestyle skiing	0	0	3	3
Luge	0	0	1	1
Snowboarding	0	0	1	1
Totals (10 entries)	5	12	15	32
