= Martin Galliker =

Swiss bobsledder (born 1973)

Martin Galliker (born 24 December 1973) is a Swiss bobsledder who has competed since 2005. He qualified for the 2006 Winter Olympics in Turin in the four-man event, but was named an alternate in place of Martin Annen and Ivo Rüegg and did not compete.

Galliker also finished eighth in the four-man event at the 2007 FIBT World Championships in St. Moritz. In 2008 Galliker was suspended for 2 years after he failed a drug test for testosterone doping.
