= Alexander Ushakov (bobsledder) =

Russian bobsledder (born 1979)

Alexander Ushakov (born 28 December 1979) is a Russian bobsledder who has competed since 2006. His best Bobsleigh World Cup finish was second in the four-man event at Winterberg in February 2008.

Ushakov's best finish at the FIBT World Championships was ninth in the four-man event at Altenberg in 2008.
