= Mike Lucas (cricketer) =

Australian cricketer (born 1944)

Personal information
- Full name: Michael John Lucas
- Born: 14 April 1944 (age 82); Ashgrove, Brisbane, Queensland, Australia
- Batting: Right-handed

Domestic team information
- Years: Team
- 1968-69 to 1974-75: Queensland

Career statistics
Competition	FC	List A
Matches	19	2
Runs scored	737	45
Batting average	19.91	22.50
100s/50s	1/3	0/0
Top score	107	40
Balls bowled	16	0
Wickets	0	–
Bowling average	–	–
5 wickets in innings	–	–
10 wickets in match	–	–
Best bowling	–	–
Catches/stumpings	7/–	1/–
- Source: Cricinfo, 23 August 2020

Michael John Lucas (born 14 April 1944) is a former Australian cricketer who played first-class cricket for Queensland from 1968 to 1975.

Mike Lucas was a middle-order batsman who scored a century on his first-class debut, making 47 and 107 when Queensland defeated New South Wales in the opening match of the 1968-69 Sheffield Shield season. In all matches that season he made 409 runs at an average of 31.46. However, he was unable to maintain that form in subsequent seasons.

Despite his poor form, midway through the 1971–72 season Lucas was appointed Queensland captain, replacing the long-serving Sam Trimble, who became vice-captain. In his second match as captain Lucas led the team to its only victory of the season, by 17 runs over South Australia. After that season he played only one more first-class match, in 1974–75.
