= Berit Wiacker =

German bobsledder (born 1982)

Personal information
- Born: 15 June 1982 (age 44) Duisburg, Germany
Medal record
Women's bobsleigh
Representing Germany
World Championships
Gold medal – first place	2007 St. Moritz	Mixed team
Gold medal – first place	2008 Altenberg	Mixed team
Silver medal – second place	2012 Lake Placid	Mixed team
European Championships
Gold medal – first place	2008 Cesana	Two-woman
Gold medal – first place	2009 St. Moritz	Two-woman
Gold medal – first place	2011 Winterberg	Two-woman

Berit Wiacker (born 15 June 1982 in Duisburg) is a German bobsledder who has competed since 2002. She won two gold medals in the mixed bobsleigh-skeleton team event at the FIBT World Championships (2007, 2008).

Prior to being in bobsleigh, Wiacker was a track and field athlete in the 100 metres hurdles.

== Career highlights ==
World Championships
2007 - St. Moritz, (gold) 1st with Kleber / Kiriasis / Riekewald (team)
European Championships
2008 - Cesana, (gold) 1st with Sandra Kiriasis
World Cup
2004 - Igls, (gold) 1st with Sandra Kiriasis
2004 - Cortina d'Ampezzo, (gold) 1st with Sandra Kiriasis
2005 - Cesana, (gold) 1st with Sandra Kiriasis
2005 - Lake Placid, (silver) 2nd with Susi Erdmann
2005 - Igls, (gold) 1st with Sandra Kiriasis
2006 - St. Moritz, (silver) 2nd with Sandra Kiriasis
2007 - Königssee, (gold) 1st with Sandra Kiriasis
2007 - Calgary, (bronze) 3rd with Sandra Kiriasis
2008 - Cesana, (bronze) 3rd with Sandra Kiriasis
