= Christine Muessiggang =

Austrian bobsledder (b. 1979)

Personal information
- Native name: Christine Müssiggang
- National team: Austria
- Born: December 12, 1979 (age 46) Innsbruck, Austria
- Years active: 2002–present
- Height: 165 cm (5 ft 5 in)
- Weight: 65 kg (143 lb; 10 st 3 lb)

Sport
- Sport: Bobsleigh
- Position: Bobsleigh
- Coached by: Maier Manfredu
- Updated on 4 June 2024

Christine Muessiggang (born 12 December 1979) is an Austrian bobsledder who has competed since 2002. Her best Bobsleigh World Cup finish was 15th in the two-woman event at Cortina d'Ampezzo, Italy in January 2008.
