= Bobsleigh at the 2018 Winter Olympics – Qualification =

The following are the criteria, rules, and final standings for qualification for the bobsleigh competitions at the 2018 Winter Olympics.

== Qualification rules ==
A maximum of 170 quota spots were available to athletes to compete at the games, a maximum of 130 men and 40 women could have qualified. The qualification was based on the world rankings of 14 January 2018 (the seventh world cup event of the season, in St. Moritz). Pilots had to compete in five different races on three different tracks during the 2016/17 season or 2017/18 season. Each continent (Africa, Americas, Asia, Europe and Oceania) and the hosts were allowed to enter a sled provided they met the above standard. For each men's event 30 sleds were allowed to compete (maximum of three NOCs with three sleds and six NOCs with two sleds). For the women's event there were a total of 20 sleds allowed to compete (maximum of two NOCs with three sleds, four NOCs with two sleds). According to the rules women were eligible for the "4-man" event as well but none competed in the applicable races.

== Qualification timeline ==
Races from 15 October 2017 until 14 January 2018 were used for qualification for the Olympics. In general this meant that the Olympic field was to be established by using the first seven world cup races of the 2017–18 season, but also included results from European, and American cup races. Four sleds then were allocated in each of the three competitions, first for the host (if not already qualified), and then for continents not previously represented. If a nation refused a quota it was reallocated. Unused or reallocated were to be filled by 19 January 2018 by nations not previously entered.

== Quota allocation ==
The following summary is based on the final IBSF quotas after reallocation. Numbers beside each nation indicate the rank of the sled that establishes the NOC's number of qualifiers.

=== Current summary ===
Nations	Two man	Four man	Two woman	Athletes
Australia	1	1		4
Austria	2	2	2	12
Belgium			2	4
Brazil	1	1		4
Canada	3	3	3	18
China	2	1		6
Croatia	1	1		4
Czech Republic	2	2		8
France	1	1		5
Germany	3	3	3	18
Great Britain	1	2	1	10
Italy		1		4
Jamaica			1	2
Latvia	2	2		8
Monaco	1			2
Nigeria			1	2
Poland	1	1		4
Romania	1	1	1	7
Olympic Athletes from Russia	2	1	2	10
South Korea	1	1	1	6
Switzerland	2	2	1	10
United States	3	3	2	16
Total: 22 NOCs	30	29	20	164

=== Two man ===
Final rankings by nation.

Sleds qualified	Countries	Athletes total	Nation
3	3	18	Germany 7 Canada 9 United States 13
2	6	24	Latvia 11; Olympic Athletes from Russia 15; Switzerland 16; Austria 29; China 31; Czech Republic 36
1	9	18	Poland 17; France 22; Monaco 24; Romania 30; Brazil 34; Australia 35; Great Britain 37; Croatia 39; South Korea 44^{1}
30	18	60	

1. South Korea qualified as the host.

=== Four man ===
Final rankings by nation.

Sleds qualified	Countries	Athletes total	Nation
3	3	36	Germany 4 Canada 16; United States 19
2	5	40	Latvia 9 Great Britain 12; Austria 27; Switzerland 30; Czech Republic 32
1	10	40	Olympic Athletes from Russia 8^{5} France 14; Brazil 21; Italy 23; China 25; Croatia 28; ~~Netherlands 35~~^{1} ~~Slovakia 36~~^{2} Romania 41^{2} Australia 42^{3} Poland 43^{1} South Korea 47^{4}
29	18	116	

1. Netherlands refused their allocation. Poland received the reallocated quota place.
2. Slovakia were forced to withdraw as their only qualified pilot was deemed ineligible for the Olympics. Romania received the reallocated quota place.
3. Australia qualified as a continental representative.
4. South Korea qualified as the host.
5. Team OAR returned one allocation which could not be filled.

=== Two woman ===
Final rankings by nation.

Sleds qualified	Countries	Athletes total	Nation
3	2	12	Germany 7 Canada 8
2	4	16	United States 4 Austria 15; Olympic Athletes from Russia 16; Belgium 20
1	6	12	Switzerland 12; Great Britain 13; Jamaica 18 Romania 19^{2} South Korea 23^{1} ~~Australia~~ 36^{2} Nigeria 44^{3}
20	12	40	

1. South Korea qualified as the host.
2. Australia qualified as a continental representative but their quota was turned down by their NOC. Romania received the reallocated quota place.
3. Nigeria qualified as a continental representative through the application of IBSF rule 4.1.
