= Jamia Jackson =

American Olympic weight lifter (born 1982)

Jamia Jackson (born May 15, 1982) is an American Olympic Weightlifting National Champion and ex bobsledder who has competed since 2002. She was the 2011 Weightlifting National Champion in the 75 kg weight class. As a bobsledder her best Bobsleigh World Cup finish was eighth in the two-woman event at St. Moritz in January 2008.

Jackson also finished 13th in the two-woman event at the 2008 FIBT World Championships in Altenberg. She is a native of Lake City, Florida.
