= Johannes Wipplinger =

Austrian bobsledder

Johannes Wipplinger (born 1 August 1978) is an Austrian bobsledder who has competed since 2004. His best finish in the Bobsleigh World Cup was third in the two-man event at Park City in December 2007.

Wipplinger's best finish at the FIBT World Championships was eighth in the four-man event at Altenberg in 2008.

He crashed out during the four-man event at the 2010 Winter Olympics in Vancouver.

== Bibliography ==
- Johannes Wipplinger at the International Bobsleigh and Skeleton Federation
