= Michael Lukas =

Swiss bobsledder (born 1983)

Michael Lukas (born 13 June 1983) is a Swiss bobsledder who has competed since 2001. His best Bobsleigh World Cup finish was third in the four-man event at Cortina d'Ampezzo in January 2008.

Lukas's best finish at the FIBT World Championships was 11th in the four-man event at Altenberg in 2008.
