= Unified Team at the Olympics =

- The Olympic flag
- IOC code: EUN
- Medals Ranked 28th: Gold 54 Silver 44 Bronze 37 Total 135

Summer appearances
- 1992

Winter appearances
- 1992

Other related appearances
- Russian Empire (1900–1912); Estonia (1920–1936, 1992–pres.); Latvia (1924–1936, 1992–pres.); Lithuania (1924–1928, 1992–pres.); Soviet Union (1952–1988); Armenia (1994–pres.); Belarus (1994–2022); Georgia (1994–pres.); Kazakhstan (1994–pres.); Kyrgyzstan (1994–pres.); Moldova (1994–pres.); Russia (1994–2016); Ukraine (1994–pres.); Uzbekistan (1994–pres.); Azerbaijan (1996–pres.); Tajikistan (1996–pres.); Turkmenistan (1996–pres.); Olympic Athletes from Russia (2018); ROC (2020–2022); Individual Neutral Athletes (2024–2026)

The Unified Team (Russian: Объединённая команда) was the name used for the sports team of the former Soviet Union (except the Baltic states) at the 1992 Winter Olympics in Albertville and the 1992 Summer Olympics in Barcelona. The IOC country code was EUN, after the French name, Équipe unifiée (French: [ekip ynifje]). The Unified Team was sometimes informally called the CIS Team (Commonwealth of Independent States, as a counterpart of CIS national football team taking part in Euro 1992 of the same year), although Georgia did not join the CIS until 1993.

The team finished second in the medal table at the 1992 Winter Games, and first at the 1992 Summer Games, edging its old rival the US in the latter.

== Ceremonies procedures ==
At the 1992 Winter Olympics, the National Olympic Committees (NOCs) of the constituent countries had not yet been affiliated to the IOC due to the dissolution of the Soviet Union having only taken place little more than two months prior. During the opening ceremony, the team's placard displayed Équipe unifiée in large print, with the names of the five participating countries displayed in smaller print below, and both the French and English announcers announced only the names of the participating countries without announcing the name "Unified Team". Russian flagbearer Valeriy Medvedtsev followed, carrying the Olympic Flag, followed by the team's athletes in no particular order, each carrying a small flag representing their individual country.

By the time of the 1992 Summer Olympics, the NOCs had affiliated separately, though they fielded a joint team with a standard uniform as Olympic qualifying rounds had been completed before the final demise of the Soviet Union. During the opening ceremony, the team's four-sided placard displayed "Unified Team" in the four official languages (French, English, Spanish, and Catalan), followed by Russian flagbearer Aleksandr Karelin carrying the Olympic Flag, followed by three more four-sided placards displaying the 12 constituent countries in English, followed by 12 flagbearers carrying the national flags of the 12 countries, followed by the athletes, all in no particular order. The announcers announced the name "Unified Team" in multiple languages, followed by the Spanish announcer announcing all 12 countries. During medals ceremonies, where an EUN individual won a medal, the national flag of the medalist's nation was raised rather than the Olympic flag, and a gold medalist's national anthem was played rather than the Olympic Hymn. In team events, the EUN team continued to use the Olympic flag and the Olympic Hymn, as team members represented different nations.

== Participating countries ==
While only five of the EUN countries took part in the 1992 Winter Olympics, all twelve participated in the 1992 Summer Olympics. At the 1994 Winter Olympics and the 1996 Summer Olympics, the nations that were part of the Unified Team started to make their Olympic debuts as independent countries.

The Unified Team's participating countries in the Summer games and the IOC codes used by them in subsequent Olympics

Countries represented with their flags during the 1992 Summer Olympic Games

Country (former Soviet republic)	IOC code (1994–)
Armenia	ARM
Azerbaijan	AZE
Belarus*	BLR
Georgia	GEO
Kazakhstan*	KAZ
Kirghizia**	KGZ
Moldova	MDA
Russia*	RUS
Tajikistan	TJK
Turkmenia**	TKM
Ukraine*	UKR
Uzbekistan*	UZB

* Unified Team participant in the Winter Olympic Games.
** Kyrgyzstan paraded under its former name Kirghizia, and Turkmenistan paraded under its former name Turkmenia.

=== Timeline of participation ===
Olympic Year/s	Teams				
1900–1912	Russian Empire				
1920					
1924–1936	as part of Romania				
1952–1988	Soviet Union				
1992	Unified Team				
1994	Moldova	Russia	Belarus	Armenia; Georgia; Kazakhstan; Kyrgyzstan; Ukraine; Uzbekistan	
1996–2016	Moldova	Russia	Belarus	Armenia; Georgia; Kazakhstan; Kyrgyzstan; Ukraine; Uzbekistan	Azerbaijan; Tajikistan; Turkmenistan
2018	Moldova	Olympic Athletes from Russia	Belarus	Armenia; Georgia; Kazakhstan; Kyrgyzstan; Ukraine; Uzbekistan	Azerbaijan; Tajikistan; Turkmenistan
2020–2022	Moldova	ROC	Belarus	Armenia; Georgia; Kazakhstan; Kyrgyzstan; Ukraine; Uzbekistan	Azerbaijan; Tajikistan; Turkmenistan
2024–present	Moldova	Individual Neutral Athletes		Armenia; Georgia; Kazakhstan; Kyrgyzstan; Ukraine; Uzbekistan	Azerbaijan; Tajikistan; Turkmenistan

== Medal tables ==
=== Medals by Summer Games ===
Games	Athletes	Gold	Silver	Bronze	Total	Rank
1992 Barcelona	475	45	38	29	112	1
Total		45	38	29	112	30

=== Medals by Winter Games ===
Games	Athletes	Gold	Silver	Bronze	Total	Rank
1992 Albertville	129	9	6	8	23	2
Total		9	6	8	23	21

=== Medals by summer sport ===
Sport	Gold	Silver	Bronze	Total
Artistic gymnastics	9	5	4	18
Athletics	7	11	3	21
Wrestling	6	5	5	16
Swimming	6	3	1	10
Weightlifting	5	4	0	9
Shooting	5	2	1	8
Judo	2	0	2	4
Fencing	1	2	2	5
Canoeing	1	1	0	2
Handball	1	0	1	2
Rhythmic gymnastics	1	0	1	2
Basketball	1	0	0	1
Diving	0	2	1	3
Boxing	0	1	1	2
Modern pentathlon	0	1	1	2
Volleyball	0	1	0	1
Archery	0	0	2	2
Tennis	0	0	2	2
Rowing	0	0	1	1
Water polo	0	0	1	1
Totals (20 entries)	45	38	29	112

=== Medals by winter sport ===
Sport	Gold	Silver	Bronze	Total
Cross country skiing	3	2	4	9
Figure skating	3	1	1	5
Biathlon	2	2	2	6
Ice hockey	1	0	0	1
Freestyle skiing	0	1	0	1
Short track speed skating	0	0	1	1
Totals (6 entries)	9	6	8	23

== Flag bearers ==
- (France) 1992 Albertville Winter Olympics - Valeriy Medvedtsev (Biathlon)
- (Spain) 1992 Barcelona Summer Olympics - Aleksandr Karelin (Wrestling)

== See also ==
- Unified Team at the Paralympics
- Unified Team of Germany
- Independent Olympic Participants at the 1992 Summer Olympics
- CIS national football team
- Olympic Athletes from Russia at the 2018 Winter Olympics
- Russian Olympic Committee athletes at the Olympics
