= Mirko Pätzold =

German bobsledder

Medal record

Men's Bobsleigh

Representing Germany

World Championships
Silver medal – second place	2008 Altenberg	Two-man

Mirko Pätzold (born 9 April 1976 in Potsdam) is a German bobsledder who has competed since 1998. He a silver medal in the two-man event at the 2008 FIBT World Championships in Altenberg, Germany.
