= Alexandr Zubkov =

Russian bobsledder (born 1974)

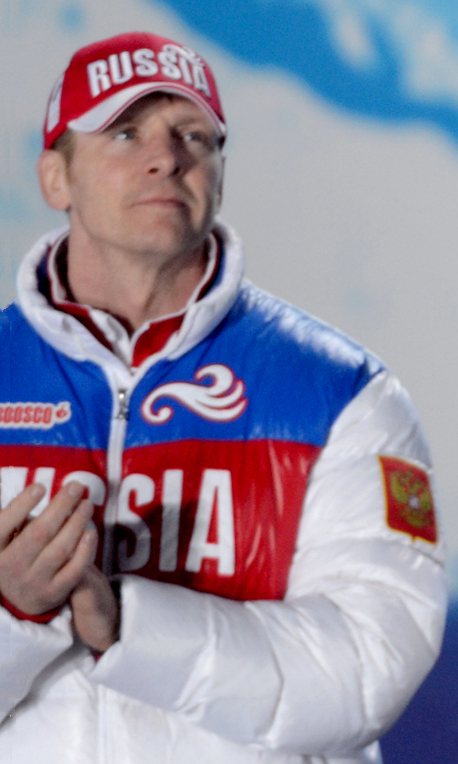
- Alexandr Zubkov at the 2014 Olympics

Personal information
- Full name: Alexandr Yuryevich Zubkov
- Nationality: Russian
- Born: 10 August 1974 (age 52) Bratsk, Russian SFSR, Soviet Union
- Height: 1.87 m (6 ft 2 in)
- Weight: 100 kg (220 lb)

Sport
- Country: Russia
- Sport: Bobsleigh (pilot)
- Turned pro: 1999

Achievements and titles
- Olympic finals: 2nd place, silver medalist(s) 3rd place, bronze medalist(s)
Medal record
Representing Russia
Olympic Games
Disqualified	2014 Sochi	Two-man
Disqualified	2014 Sochi	Four-man
Silver medal – second place	2006 Turin	Four-man
Bronze medal – third place	2010 Vancouver	Two-man
World Championships
Gold medal – first place	2011 Königssee	Two-man
Silver medal – second place	2005 Calgary	Four-man
Silver medal – second place	2008 Altenberg	Four-man
Silver medal – second place	2013 St. Moritz	Four-man
Bronze medal – third place	2003 Lake Placid	Four-man
Bronze medal – third place	2008 Altenberg	Two-man
World Cup Championships
Gold medal – first place	2004–05	Four-man
Gold medal – first place	2005–06	Four-man
Gold medal – first place	2008–09	Combined
Gold medal – first place	2008–09	Four-man
Gold medal – first place	2010–11	Two-man
Gold medal – first place	2011–12	Four-man
Gold medal – first place	2012–13	Four-man
Silver medal – second place	2003–04	Four-man
Silver medal – second place	2004–05	Combined
Silver medal – second place	2005–06	Combined
Silver medal – second place	2005–06	Two-man
Silver medal – second place	2007–08	Combined
Silver medal – second place	2007–08	Four-man
Silver medal – second place	2010–11	Combined
Silver medal – second place	2011–12	Combined
Silver medal – second place	2012–13	Combined
Bronze medal – third place	2004–05	Two-man
Bronze medal – third place	2007–08	Two-man
Bronze medal – third place	2010–11	Four-man
Bronze medal – third place	2011–12	Two-man

Alexandr Yuryevich Zubkov (Russian: Александр Юрьевич Зубков; born 10 August 1974) is a Russian retired bobsledder who has competed since 1999. Competing in four Winter Olympics, he won two medals with a silver in 2006 (four-man) and a bronze in 2010 (two-man). On 24 November 2017, he was found guilty of doping offences and stripped of his medals from the 2014 Winter Olympics.

== Career ==
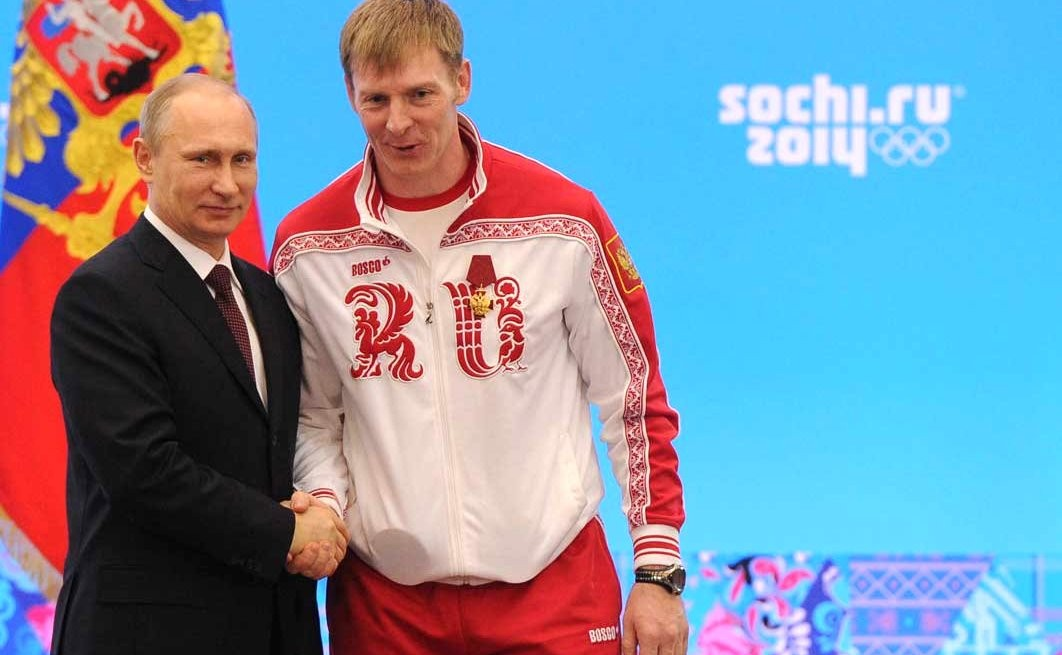
Zubkov with President Vladimir Putin at the award ceremonies for Russian athletes, 24 February 2014

Zubkov also won four medals at the FIBT World Championships with two silvers (Four-man: 2005, 2008) and two bronzes (Two-man: 2008, Four-man: 2003). He won the Bobsleigh World Cup in the four-man event three times as well (2004–5, 2005–6, 2008–9).

Prior to competing in bobsleigh, he competed in luge. Zubkov finished 20th in the men's singles event at the 1998 Winter Olympics in Nagano.

=== 2014 Winter Olympics ===
In 2014 Sochi Winter Olympics, he was the flag bearer of Russia for the Opening Ceremony. Zubkov won Gold in both Two-Man and Four-Man Bobsleigh.

In the 2014 Sochi Olympics, Zubkov was coached by a former rival, Canadian Pierre Lueders. Zubkov also paid a fee to borrow personal skids from the 2011 World Champion, Germany's Manuel Machata. Machata bought the skids for €29,000 in Switzerland, and had not qualified for the 2014 Winter Olympics. The 2014 Olympics saw Germany failing to win a bobsleigh medal at an Olympics for the first time since Innsbruck 1964. Machata did not inform German Bobsleigh Luge and Skeleton Federation of this loan and received a one-year competitive ban and fine of €5,000 (250,000 rubles) from the German Federation.

After the 2014 Olympics, Zubkov received the Order "For Merit to the Fatherland" award 4th class with Russian President Vladimir Putin handing the state awards.

In October 2014 Zubkov announced his retirement from the sport due to a long-term injury which prevented him from competing at the start of the 2014–15 season.

In May 2016, Zubkov was named in a New York Times investigation of the state-sponsored steroid program in Russia. On 24 November 2017, he was found guilty of doping offenses by the International Olympic Committee and stripped of his medals from the 2014 Winter Olympics. On 1 February 2018, following a Russian appeal, the CAS removed the sanctions from Alexey Negodaylo and Dmitry Trunenkov in bobsleigh, but upheld them on their teammates Alexandr Zubkov and Alexey Voyevoda. In 2018, Zubkov appealed this decision in the Moscow City Court, which decided not to recognise the CAS decision in Russia. Despite no longer being an Olympic gold medallist, the Russian government has continued to classify him as an Olympic champion and pay him the lifetime Presidential stipend which is awarded to all Olympics medal winners.

== Personal life ==
His daughter, Elisaveta Zubkova, is a Russian skeleton slider.

Olympic Games
Preceded by Aleksey Morozov	Flagbearer for Russia; Sochi 2014	Succeeded by Incumbent
