= Alexey Negodaylo =

Russian bobsledder (born 1989)

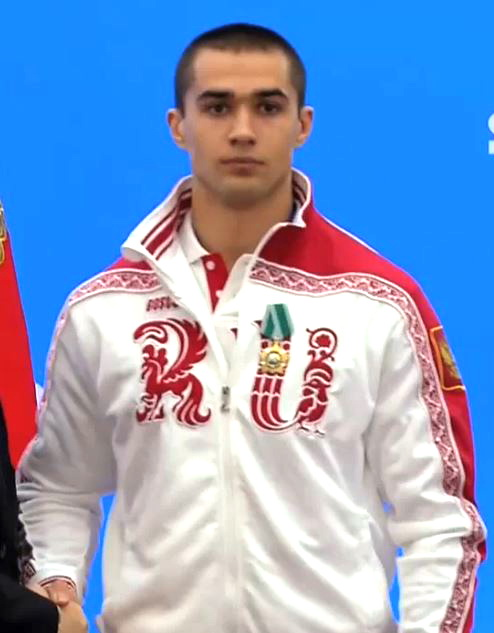

Personal information
- Born: 28 May 1989 (age 37) Russian SFSR, Soviet Union
- Height: 1.86 m (6 ft 1 in)
- Weight: 98 kg (216 lb)

Sport
- Country: Russia
- Sport: Bobsleigh
- Turned pro: 2010
Medal record
Men's bobsleigh
Representing Russia
Olympic Games
Disqualified	2014 Sochi	Four-man
World Championships
Silver medal – second place	2013 St. Moritz	Four-man

Alexey Aleksandrovich Negodaylo (Russian: Алексей Александрович Негодайло; born 28 May 1989) is a Russian bobsledder who has competed since 2010.

== Career ==
Negodaylo was part of a four-man Russian team who originally won gold at the 2014 Winter Olympics but was then disqualified and stripped of medals because Alexandr Zubkov tested positive for doping. On 27 November 2017, Negodaylo was found guilty in anti-doping rule violations, disqualified and declared ineligible for future Olympic games.

On 1 February 2018, the CAS removed the sanctions from Alexey Negodaylo and Dmitry Trunenkov in bobsleigh, but upheld them on their teammates Alexandr Zubkov and Alexey Voyevoda.
