= Nicole Herschmann =

German triple jumper and bobsledder

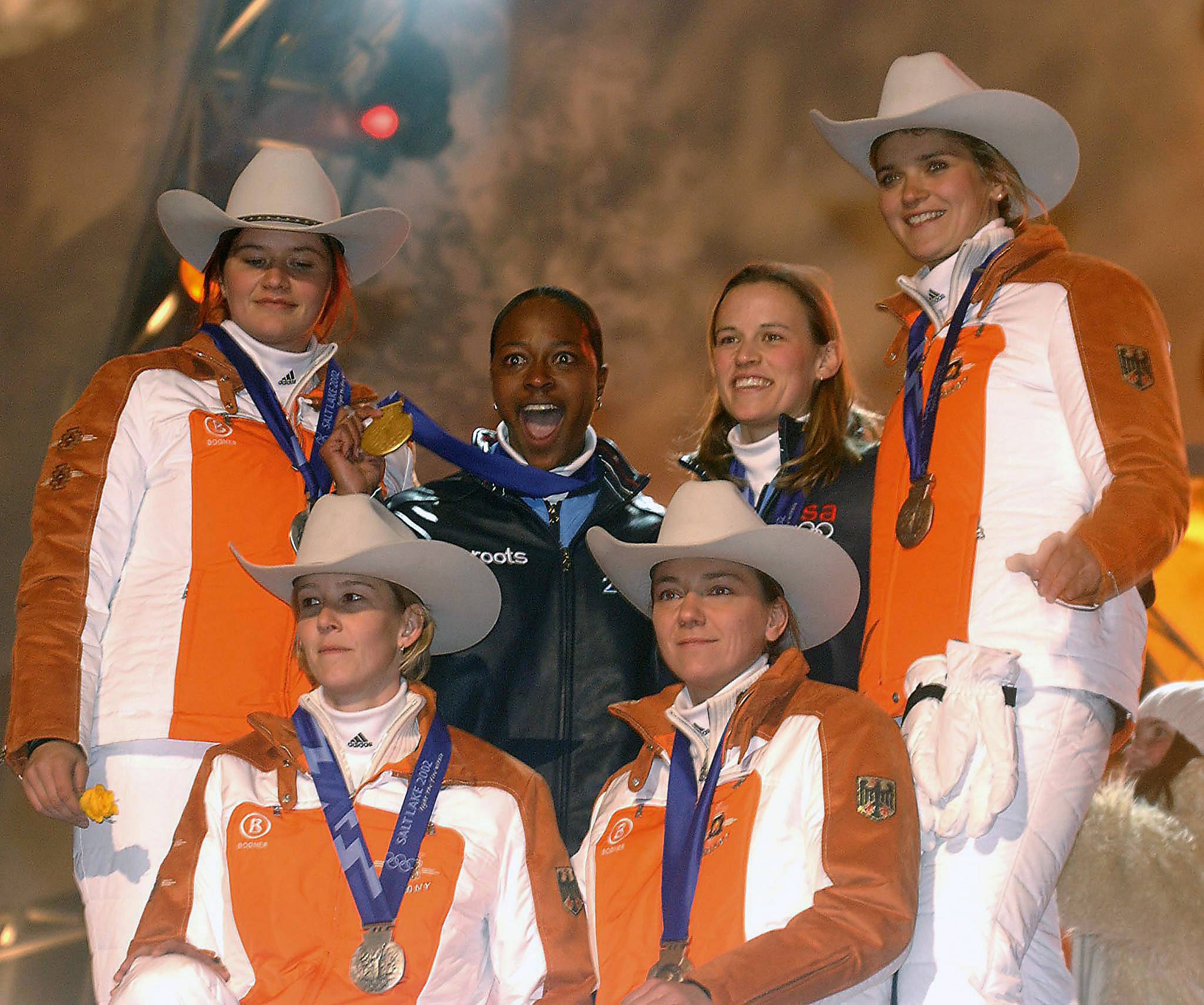

Medal record

Women's bobsleigh

Representing Germany

Olympic Games
Bronze medal – third place	2002 Salt Lake City	Two-woman

World Championships
Bronze medal – third place	2008 Altenberg	Two-woman

European Championships
Silver medal – second place	2004 Sigulda	Two-woman

Nicole Herschmann (born 27 October 1975 in Rudolstadt, East Germany) is a German former triple jumper and bobsledder. Competing in two Winter Olympics, she won a bronze medal in the two-woman event at Salt Lake City in 2002.

Herschmann also won a bronze in the two-woman event at the 2008 FIBT World Championships in Altenberg, Germany.
