= Dmitry Trunenkov =

Russian bobsledder (born 1984)

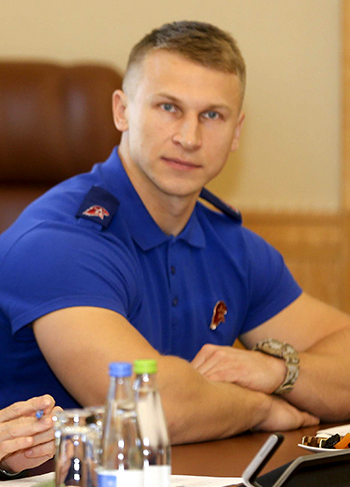
- All-Russia "Young Army" National Military Patriotic Social Movement Association

Personal information
- Nationality: (Russia) Russian
- Born: April 19, 1984 (age 42) Taseyevo, Krasnoyarsk Krai, Russian SFSR, Soviet Union
Medal record
Bobsleigh
Representing Russia
Olympic Games
Disqualified	2014 Sochi	Four-man
World Championships
Silver medal – second place	2008 Altenberg	Four-man
Silver medal – second place	2013 St. Moritz	Four-man
European Championships
Gold medal – first place	2009 St. Moritz	Four-man
Silver medal – second place	2007 Cortina	Four-man
Silver medal – second place	2011 Winterberg	Four-man
Silver medal – second place	2012 Altenberg	Four-man

Dmitry Vyacheslavovich Trunenkov (Russian: Дмитрий Вячеславович Труненков; born 19 April 1984) is a Russian bobsledder who has competed since the early 2000s.

== Career ==
He won the silver medal in the four-man event at the 2008 FIBT World Championships in Altenberg, Germany. He won a gold medal at the 2009 Bobsleigh European Championship in St. Moritz, Switzerland and three European silver medals, all in the four-man event.

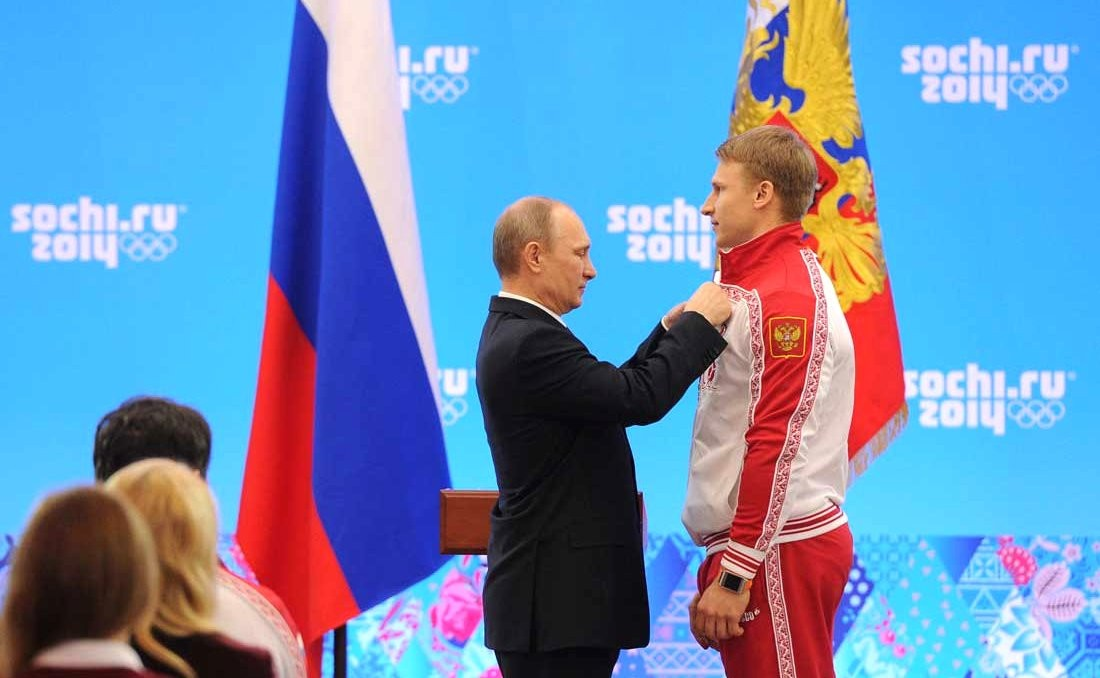
Vladimir Putin and Dmitry Trunenkov 24 February 2014

Trunenkov originally took up sprinting whilst at university before switching to bobsleigh at the age of 21.

At the 2010 Winter Olympics, Trunenkov crashed during the four-man event.

Trunenkov has a degree in industrial and civil construction from Krasnoyarsk State Academy of Architecture and Construction, which became part of the Siberian Federal University in 2006. He holds the title of Merited Master of Sport in Russia. He is married to Elena and they have a daughter, Dana.

On 31 January 2017, the Russian Anti-Doping Agency announced that Trunenkov had been banned for four years from April 2016 due to a doping violation.

Trunenkov was part of a four-man Russian team who originally won gold at the 2014 Winter Olympics but was then disqualified and stripped of medals because Alexandr Zubkov tested positive for doping. On 27 November 2017, Trunenkov was found guilty in anti-doping rule violations, disqualified and declared ineligible for future Olympic games.

On 1 February 2018, the CAS removed the sanctions from Alexey Negodaylo and Dmitry Trunenkov in bobsleigh, but upheld them on their teammates Alexandr Zubkov and Alexey Voyevoda.
