= Alexey Voyevoda =

Russian bobsledder and politician

Alexey Voyevoda Алексей Воевода
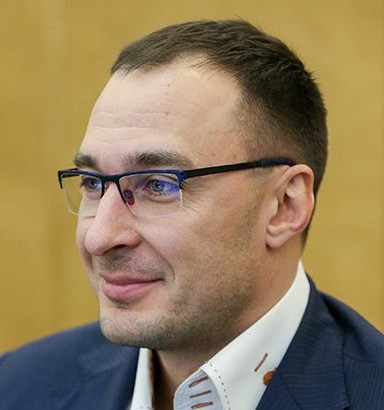

Personal information
- Native name: Алексей Иванович Воевода
- Full name: Alexey Ivanovich Voyevoda
- Nationality: Russian
- Born: 9 May 1980 (age 46) Kalynovytsya, Varva Raion, Chernihiv Oblast, Ukrainian SSR, Soviet Union
- Height: 1.93 m (6 ft 4 in)
- Weight: 116 kg (256 lb)

Sport
- Country: Russia
- Sport: Bobsleigh

Achievements and titles
- Olympic finals: 2nd place, silver medalist(s) 3rd place, bronze medalist(s)
Medal record
Representing Russia
Olympic Games
Disqualified	2014 Sochi	Four-man
Disqualified	2014 Sochi	Two-man
Silver medal – second place	2006 Turin	Four-man
Bronze medal – third place	2010 Vancouver	Two-man
World Championships
Gold medal – first place	2011 Königssee	Two-man
Bronze medal – third place	2008 Altenberg	Two-man

Alexey Ivanovich Voyevoda (Russian: Алексей Иванович Воевода; born 9 May 1980) is a Russian bobsledder, professional arm wrestler and politician.

== Bobsleigh ==
A professional bobsleigher since 2002, Voyevoda won silver in the four-man bobsleigh event with teammates Philippe Egorov, Alexei Seliverstov, and Alexandre Zoubkov at the 2006 Winter Olympics in Turin. He also won a bronze in the two-man event at the 2008 FIBT World Championships in Altenberg, Germany. At the 2010 Winter Olympics in Vancouver, Voyevoda won a bronze in the two-man event. At the 2014 Winter Olympics in Sochi, Voyevoda initially won a gold medal in the two-man event and a gold medal in the four-man event. Voyevoda received the Order For Merit to the Fatherland Award 4th class with Russian President Vladimir Putin handing the state awards.

On 24 November 2017, he was stripped of the 2014 Olympic medals by the International Olympic Committee, following the doping violation of his bobsledding partner Aleksandr Zubkov. On 18 December 2017, Voyevoda received a personal lifetime ban from the Olympic Games due to doping violations at the 2014 Winter Olympics.

On 1 February 2018, the CAS removed the sanctions from Alexey Negodaylo and Dmitry Trunenkov in bobsleigh, but upheld them on their teammates Alexandr Zubkov and Alexey Voyevoda.

== Arm wrestling ==
Voyevoda holds a good deal of recognition as a professional arm wrestler, having also secured several Russian arm wrestling championships. His triumph over legendary arm-wrestler John Brzenk was immortalized in the feature-length documentary, "Pulling John", directed by Vassiliki Khonsari and Sevan Matossian. The film "Pulling John" also chronicles his life and training in Russia. He was defeated by Travis Bagent at the 2003 WAF championship, but won the Zloty Tur 2004 cup one year later, defeating high level arm wrestlers such as Bagent, Brzenk, Matt Girdner, and Alexey Semerenko. Voyevoda reclaimed the WAF championship in 2004 (left- and right-handed) and won the European Championship the same year. After a left-hand vendetta match with Alexey Semerenko (winning 4–2) and Travis Bagent (losing 5–1) in 2005, Voyevoda took a break from his professional arm wrestling career to return to bobsleigh training until 2007. As of 2007, Alexey Voyevoda returned to the arm wrestling scene once again, winning a vendetta match 6–0 against Michael Todd in Bulgaria on 26 May. After that brief comeback, he resigned from the arm wrestling scene due to his bobsleigh and Olympic judo training until February 2016. In February 2016, Voyevoda decided to return to arm wrestling and faced Tim Bresnan, but failed to produce the skills and power he once had, ultimately losing the fight 5–1.

On 24 June 2023, Voyevoda signed a contract to face John Brzenk at King of the Table 8 on 23 September 2023. He lost the match 4-2 and stated that he was unsure of his future in arm wrestling.

=== Notable matches/tournaments ===
Year	Opponent	Result	Hand	Outcome	Event
2023	John Brzenk	Loss	Right Hand	2-4	KOTT 8
2016	Tim Bresnan	Loss	Right Hand	1-5	PAL Armfight #45
2007	Michael Todd	Win	Right Hand	6-0	PAL Armfight #29
2005	Alexey Semerenko	Win	Left Hand	4-2	PAL Armfight #13
2005	Travis Bagent	Loss	Left Hand	1-5	PAL Armfight #9
2004	95 kg+, open class	Win	Right Hand		Zloty Tur/Nemiroff World Cup
2004	110 kg+	Win	Right and Left Hand		WAF Championship

== Politics ==
Following the September 2016 elections in Russia, Voyevoda became a state deputy from Krasnodar Krai, representing the ruling party, United Russia.

== Personal life ==
Voyevoda is a vegan, calisthenic and he has said that he has never consumed any type of steroid to achieve his physique.
