= FIBT World Championships 2008 =

Bobsleigh and skeleton competition

2008 World Championships
- Location: Altenberg, Germany
- Dates: February 11–24

The FIBT World Championships 2008 ran February 11–24, 2008 in Altenberg, Germany for the fifth time, having done so in 1991 (bobsleigh), 1994 (skeleton), 1999 (skeleton), and 2000 (men's bobsleigh). It is the first time Altenberg has hosted all of those events at one championship, and also includes the mixed team event (one run each of men's skeleton, women's skeleton, 2-man bobsleigh, and 2-women bobsleigh) that debuted at the 2007 championships. Training for the events took place February 12–14 for two-man and two-woman bobsleigh, and February 19–20 for skeleton and four-man bobsleigh.

== Non-competitive events ==
- Practice for men's and women's bobsleigh was cancelled on February 12 to fog and moist air, which affected track visibility. Additional training took place on the 13th.

== Bobsleigh ==
=== Two man ===
February 16–17, 2008. 30 sleds were scheduled to compete. 26 sleds finished with one team disqualified after the first run, one team not finishing the second run, and two teams not starting after the third run. Lange and Kuske won their third two-man world championship and fifth overall.

Pos	Team	Time
Gold	Germany (André Lange, Kevin Kuske)	3:40.58
Silver	Germany (Thomas Florschuetz, Mirko Paetzold)	+1.06
Bronze	Russia (Alexandre Zoubkov, Alexey Voevoda)	+1.39

=== Four man ===
February 23–24, 2008. 24 sleds competed with 20 finishing. Lange swept both events with the fastest times in each heat. It was his second sweep at the FIBT World Championships, having done so in 2003 and his third overall, counting the 2006 Winter Olympics.

Pos	Team	Time
Gold	Germany (André Lange, René Hoppe, Kevin Kuske, Martin Putze)	3:36.26
Silver	Russia (Alexander Zubkov, Roman Oreshnikov, Dmitry Trunenkov, Dmitriy Stepushkin)	+2.02
Bronze	Germany (Matthias Höpfner, Ronny Listner, Thomas Pöge, Alex Mann)	+2.59

=== Two woman ===
February 15–16, 2008. 25 sleds were scheduled to compete. 23 sleds actually did with one withdrawing after the first run, one withdrawing after the second run, and two crashing out during the fourth run. This event marks the first ever sweep in the bobsleigh part of the championships' history and only the second time ever in any event in the championships' history with Austria being the first to do so in skeleton at Igls in 1991. Counting the 2006 Winter Olympics in Turin, this is Kiriasis's fourth straight World or Olympic championships in this event. Several crashes occurred the two-day event.

Pos	Team	Time
Gold	Germany (Sandra Kiriasis, Romy Logsch)	3:49.50
Silver	Germany (Cathleen Martini, Janine Tischer)	+0.26
Bronze	Germany (Claudia Schramm, Nicole Herschmann)	+1.12

== Skeleton ==
=== Men ===
February 21–22, 2008. Bromley is the first British athlete to win a world championship since 1965. Changing ice conditions complicated the sliding, causing five top sliders to leave their starting grooves.

Pos	Athlete	Time
Gold	Kristan Bromley (GBR)	3:54.71
Silver	Jon Montgomery (CAN)	+0.68
Bronze	Frank Rommel (GER)	+0.74

=== Women ===
February 22–23, 2008. Huber won her second gold of the while Uhlaender won her second medal of the championships. It was Germany's fourth gold at the championships.

Pos	Athlete	Time
Gold	Anja Huber (GER)	4:02.78
Silver	Katie Uhlaender (USA)	+0.30
Bronze	Kerstin Jürgens (GER)	+1.12

== Mixed team ==
February 18, 2008. Six teams took part in the event. Germany won their second gold medal in these championships.

Pos	Team	Time
Gold	Germany (Sebastian Haupt, Sandra Kiriasis, Berit Wiacker, Anja Huber, Matthias Höpfner, Alex Mann)	3:57.20
Silver	Canada (Jon Montgomery, Kaillie Humphries, Jenni Hucul, Michelle Kelly, Lyndon Rush, Nathan Cross)	+1.78
Bronze	United States (Zach Lund, Erin Pac, Emily Azevedo, Katie Uhlaender, Steven Holcomb, Curtis Tomasevicz)	+1.87

== Medal table ==
Rank	Nation	Gold	Silver	Bronze	Total
1	Germany (GER)	5	2	4	11
2	Great Britain (GBR)	1	0	0	1
3	Canada (CAN)	0	2	0	2
4	Russia (RUS)	0	1	1	2
4	United States (USA)	0	1	1	2
Totals (5 entries)		6	6	6	18
