= All-time Olympic Games medal table =

List of medals won by Olympic delegations

The all-time medal table for all Olympic Games from 1896 to 2026, including Summer Olympic Games, Winter Olympic Games, and a combined total of both, is tabulated below. These Olympic medal counts do not include the 1906 Intercalated Games which are no longer recognized by the International Olympic Committee (IOC) as official Games. The IOC itself does not publish all-time tables, and publishes unofficial tables only per single Games. This table was thus compiled by adding up single entries from the IOC database.

The results are attributed to the IOC country code as currently displayed by the IOC database. Usually, a single code corresponds to a single National Olympic Committee (NOC). When different codes are displayed for different years, medal counts are combined in the case of a simple change of IOC code (such as from HOL to NED for the Netherlands) or simple change of country name (such as from Ceylon to Sri Lanka). As the medals are attributed to each NOC, not all totals include medals won by athletes from that country for another NOC, such as before independence of that country. Names in italic are national entities that no longer exist. The totals of NOCs are not combined with those of their predecessors and successors.

World map showing nations that have won Summer Olympic medals, as of completion of the 2024 Summer Olympics.

World map showing nations that have won Winter Olympic medals, as of completion of the 2026 Winter Olympics.

== List of NOCs with medals (sortable & unranked) ==
The table is pre-sorted by the name of each Olympic Committee, but can be displayed as sorted by any other column, such as the total number of gold medals or total number of overall medals. To sort by gold, silver, and then bronze, sort first by the bronze column, then the silver, and then the gold. The table does not count revoked medals (e.g., due to doping).

A total of 162 current and historical NOCs have earned at least one medal. Medal totals in this table are current through the 2026 Winter Olympics, and all changes in medal standings and medal redistribution up to 11 August 2024 for the Summer Games and 19 September 2025 for the Winter Games are taken into account.

As of completion of the 2026 Winter Olympics, 12 National Olympic Committees (NOC) have participated on a standalone basis in all 24 Winter Olympic Games. As of completion of the 2024 Summer Olympics, two NOCs (Great Britain and Greece) have participated on a standalone basis in all 30 Summer Olympic Games. Four other NOCs have missed a perfect participation record due to the 1980 Summer Olympics boycott, while two additional NOCs (France and Switzerland) missed the 1904 Summer Olympics, although athletes of their nationalities competed for other countries. Of the combined 55 Olympic Games, only Great Britain has a 100% participation rate.

Special delegation, not an actual nation

All-time Olympic Games medal table (Medal table does not include medals for feats and non-sport events)
| Team | Summer Olympic Games | | | | | Winter Olympic Games | | | | | Combined total | | | | |
| Team (IOC code) | No. | Gold medal | Silver medal | Bronze medal | | No. | Gold medal | Silver medal | Bronze medal | | No. | Gold medal | Silver medal | Bronze medal | |
|---|---|---|---|---|---|---|---|---|---|---|---|---|---|---|---|
| Afghanistan | 16 | 0 | 0 | 2 | 2 | 0 | 0 | 0 | 0 | 0 | 16 | 0 | 0 | 2 | 2 |
| Albania | 10 | 0 | 0 | 2 | 2 | 6 | 0 | 0 | 0 | 0 | 16 | 0 | 0 | 2 | 2 |
| Algeria | 15 | 7 | 4 | 9 | 20 | 3 | 0 | 0 | 0 | 0 | 18 | 7 | 4 | 9 | 20 |
| Argentina | 26 | 22 | 27 | 31 | 80 | 21 | 0 | 0 | 0 | 0 | 47 | 22 | 27 | 31 | 80 |
| Armenia | 8 | 2 | 11 | 9 | 22 | 9 | 0 | 0 | 0 | 0 | 17 | 2 | 11 | 9 | 22 |
| Australasia^{[ANZ]} | 2 | 3 | 4 | 5 | 12 | 0 | 0 | 0 | 0 | 0 | 2 | 3 | 4 | 5 | 12 |
| Australia^{[AUS]}^{[Z]} | 28 | 180 | 189 | 225 | 594 | 21 | 9 | 9 | 7 | 25 | 49 | 189 | 198 | 232 | 619 |
| Austria | 28 | 21 | 34 | 43 | 98 | 25 | 76 | 97 | 96 | 269 | 53 | 97 | 131 | 139 | 367 |
| Azerbaijan | 8 | 9 | 16 | 31 | 56 | 8 | 0 | 0 | 0 | 0 | 16 | 9 | 16 | 31 | 56 |
| Bahamas | 18 | 8 | 2 | 6 | 16 | 0 | 0 | 0 | 0 | 0 | 18 | 8 | 2 | 6 | 16 |
| Bahrain | 11 | 4 | 3 | 1 | 8 | 0 | 0 | 0 | 0 | 0 | 11 | 4 | 3 | 1 | 8 |
| Barbados^{[BAR]} | 14 | 0 | 0 | 1 | 1 | 0 | 0 | 0 | 0 | 0 | 14 | 0 | 0 | 1 | 1 |
| Belarus | 7 | 13 | 30 | 42 | 85 | 8 | 8 | 7 | 5 | 20 | 15 | 21 | 37 | 47 | 105 |
| Belgium | 28 | 47 | 57 | 64 | 168 | 23 | 2 | 2 | 5 | 9 | 51 | 49 | 59 | 69 | 177 |
| Bermuda | 20 | 1 | 0 | 1 | 2 | 8 | 0 | 0 | 0 | 0 | 28 | 1 | 0 | 1 | 2 |
| Bohemia^{[BOH]}^{[Z]} | 3 | 0 | 1 | 3 | 4 | 0 | 0 | 0 | 0 | 0 | 3 | 0 | 1 | 3 | 4 |
| Botswana | 12 | 1 | 2 | 1 | 4 | 0 | 0 | 0 | 0 | 0 | 12 | 1 | 2 | 1 | 4 |
| Brazil | 24 | 40 | 49 | 81 | 170 | 10 | 1 | 0 | 0 | 1 | 34 | 41 | 49 | 81 | 171 |
| British West Indies^{[BWI]} | 1 | 0 | 0 | 2 | 2 | 0 | 0 | 0 | 0 | 0 | 1 | 0 | 0 | 2 | 2 |
| Bulgaria^{[H]} | 22 | 57 | 89 | 85 | 231 | 22 | 1 | 2 | 5 | 8 | 44 | 58 | 91 | 90 | 239 |
| Burkina Faso | 11 | 0 | 0 | 1 | 1 | 0 | 0 | 0 | 0 | 0 | 11 | 0 | 0 | 1 | 1 |
| Burundi | 8 | 1 | 1 | 0 | 2 | 0 | 0 | 0 | 0 | 0 | 8 | 1 | 1 | 0 | 2 |
| Cameroon | 16 | 3 | 1 | 2 | 6 | 1 | 0 | 0 | 0 | 0 | 17 | 3 | 1 | 2 | 6 |
| Canada | 27 | 79 | 117 | 155 | 351 | 25 | 82 | 79 | 85 | 246 | 52 | 161 | 196 | 240 | 597 |
| Cape Verde | 8 | 0 | 0 | 1 | 1 | 0 | 0 | 0 | 0 | 0 | 8 | 0 | 0 | 1 | 1 |
| Chile^{[I]} | 25 | 3 | 8 | 4 | 15 | 19 | 0 | 0 | 0 | 0 | 44 | 3 | 8 | 4 | 15 |
| China^{[CHN]} | 12 | 303 | 226 | 198 | 727 | 13 | 27 | 36 | 29 | 92 | 25 | 330 | 262 | 227 | 819 |
| Chinese Taipei^{[TPE]}^{[TPE2]} | 16 | 9 | 11 | 23 | 43 | 14 | 0 | 0 | 0 | 0 | 30 | 9 | 11 | 23 | 43 |
| Colombia | 21 | 5 | 16 | 17 | 38 | 4 | 0 | 0 | 0 | 0 | 25 | 5 | 16 | 17 | 38 |
| Costa Rica | 17 | 1 | 1 | 2 | 4 | 6 | 0 | 0 | 0 | 0 | 23 | 1 | 1 | 2 | 4 |
| Croatia | 9 | 16 | 15 | 18 | 49 | 10 | 4 | 6 | 1 | 11 | 19 | 20 | 21 | 19 | 60 |
| Cuba^{[Z]} | 22 | 86 | 70 | 88 | 244 | 0 | 0 | 0 | 0 | 0 | 22 | 86 | 70 | 88 | 244 |
| Cyprus | 12 | 0 | 2 | 0 | 2 | 13 | 0 | 0 | 0 | 0 | 25 | 0 | 2 | 0 | 2 |
| Czech Republic^{[CZE]} | 8 | 22 | 22 | 28 | 72 | 9 | 12 | 13 | 14 | 39 | 17 | 34 | 35 | 42 | 111 |
| Czechoslovakia^{[TCH]} | 16 | 49 | 49 | 45 | 143 | 16 | 2 | 8 | 15 | 25 | 32 | 51 | 57 | 60 | 168 |
| Denmark^{[Z]} | 29 | 50 | 80 | 84 | 214 | 16 | 0 | 2 | 0 | 2 | 45 | 50 | 82 | 84 | 216 |
| Djibouti^{[B]} | 10 | 0 | 0 | 1 | 1 | 0 | 0 | 0 | 0 | 0 | 10 | 0 | 0 | 1 | 1 |
| Dominica | 8 | 1 | 0 | 0 | 1 | 1 | 0 | 0 | 0 | 0 | 9 | 1 | 0 | 0 | 1 |
| Dominican Republic | 16 | 4 | 5 | 6 | 15 | 0 | 0 | 0 | 0 | 0 | 16 | 4 | 5 | 6 | 15 |
| Ecuador | 16 | 4 | 4 | 2 | 10 | 3 | 0 | 0 | 0 | 0 | 19 | 4 | 4 | 2 | 10 |
| Egypt^{[EGY]}^{[Z]} | 24 | 9 | 12 | 20 | 41 | 1 | 0 | 0 | 0 | 0 | 25 | 9 | 12 | 20 | 41 |
| Eritrea | 7 | 0 | 0 | 1 | 1 | 3 | 0 | 0 | 0 | 0 | 10 | 0 | 0 | 1 | 1 |
| Estonia | 14 | 10 | 9 | 17 | 36 | 12 | 4 | 3 | 2 | 9 | 26 | 14 | 12 | 19 | 45 |
| Ethiopia | 15 | 24 | 16 | 22 | 62 | 2 | 0 | 0 | 0 | 0 | 17 | 24 | 16 | 22 | 62 |
| Fiji | 16 | 2 | 1 | 1 | 4 | 3 | 0 | 0 | 0 | 0 | 19 | 2 | 1 | 1 | 4 |
| Finland | 27 | 101 | 85 | 119 | 305 | 25 | 45 | 66 | 70 | 181 | 52 | 146 | 151 | 189 | 486 |
| France^{[O]}^{[P]}^{[Z]} | 29 | 243 | 279 | 302 | 824 | 25 | 50 | 50 | 61 | 161 | 54 | 293 | 329 | 363 | 985 |
| Gabon | 12 | 0 | 1 | 0 | 1 | 0 | 0 | 0 | 0 | 0 | 12 | 0 | 1 | 0 | 1 |
| Georgia | 8 | 13 | 15 | 19 | 47 | 9 | 0 | 1 | 0 | 1 | 17 | 13 | 16 | 19 | 48 |
| Germany^{[GER]}^{[Z]} | 18 | 214 | 219 | 254 | 687 | 14 | 113 | 107 | 73 | 293 | 32 | 327 | 326 | 327 | 980 |
| United Team of Germany^{[EUA]} | 3 | 28 | 54 | 36 | 118 | 3 | 8 | 6 | 5 | 19 | 6 | 36 | 60 | 41 | 137 |
| East Germany^{[GDR]} | 5 | 153 | 129 | 127 | 409 | 6 | 39 | 36 | 35 | 110 | 11 | 192 | 165 | 162 | 519 |
| West Germany^{[FRG]} | 5 | 56 | 67 | 81 | 204 | 6 | 11 | 15 | 13 | 39 | 11 | 67 | 82 | 94 | 243 |
| Ghana^{[GHA]} | 16 | 0 | 1 | 4 | 5 | 3 | 0 | 0 | 0 | 0 | 19 | 0 | 1 | 4 | 5 |
| Great Britain^{[GBR]}^{[Z]} | 30 | 303 | 340 | 343 | 986 | 25 | 15 | 6 | 18 | 39 | 55 | 318 | 346 | 361 | 1025 |
| Greece | 30 | 36 | 46 | 47 | 129 | 21 | 0 | 0 | 0 | 0 | 51 | 36 | 46 | 47 | 129 |
| Grenada | 11 | 1 | 1 | 3 | 5 | 0 | 0 | 0 | 0 | 0 | 11 | 1 | 1 | 3 | 5 |
| Guatemala | 15 | 1 | 1 | 1 | 3 | 1 | 0 | 0 | 0 | 0 | 16 | 1 | 1 | 1 | 3 |
| Guyana^{[GUY]} | 19 | 0 | 0 | 1 | 1 | 0 | 0 | 0 | 0 | 0 | 19 | 0 | 0 | 1 | 1 |
| Haiti^{[J]} | 17 | 0 | 1 | 1 | 2 | 2 | 0 | 0 | 0 | 0 | 19 | 0 | 1 | 1 | 2 |
| Hong Kong^{[HKG]} | 18 | 4 | 3 | 6 | 13 | 7 | 0 | 0 | 0 | 0 | 25 | 4 | 3 | 6 | 13 |
| Hungary | 28 | 187 | 161 | 182 | 530 | 25 | 2 | 2 | 6 | 10 | 53 | 189 | 163 | 188 | 540 |
| Iceland | 22 | 0 | 2 | 2 | 4 | 20 | 0 | 0 | 0 | 0 | 42 | 0 | 2 | 2 | 4 |
| India^{[F]} | 26 | 10 | 10 | 21 | 41 | 12 | 0 | 0 | 0 | 0 | 38 | 10 | 10 | 21 | 41 |
| Indonesia | 17 | 10 | 14 | 16 | 40 | 0 | 0 | 0 | 0 | 0 | 17 | 10 | 14 | 16 | 40 |
| Iran^{[K]} | 18 | 27 | 29 | 32 | 88 | 13 | 0 | 0 | 0 | 0 | 31 | 27 | 29 | 32 | 88 |
| Iraq | 16 | 0 | 0 | 1 | 1 | 0 | 0 | 0 | 0 | 0 | 16 | 0 | 0 | 1 | 1 |
| Ireland | 23 | 15 | 10 | 17 | 42 | 9 | 0 | 0 | 0 | 0 | 32 | 15 | 10 | 17 | 42 |
| Israel | 18 | 4 | 6 | 10 | 20 | 9 | 0 | 0 | 0 | 0 | 27 | 4 | 6 | 10 | 20 |
| Italy^{[M]}^{[S]} | 29 | 229 | 201 | 228 | 658 | 25 | 52 | 49 | 70 | 171 | 54 | 281 | 250 | 298 | 829 |
| Ivory Coast^{[CIV]} | 15 | 1 | 1 | 3 | 5 | 0 | 0 | 0 | 0 | 0 | 15 | 1 | 1 | 3 | 5 |
| Jamaica^{[JAM]} | 19 | 27 | 39 | 28 | 94 | 10 | 0 | 0 | 0 | 0 | 29 | 27 | 39 | 28 | 94 |
| Japan | 24 | 189 | 162 | 191 | 542 | 23 | 22 | 36 | 42 | 100 | 47 | 211 | 198 | 233 | 642 |
| Jordan | 12 | 1 | 2 | 1 | 4 | 0 | 0 | 0 | 0 | 0 | 12 | 1 | 2 | 1 | 4 |
| Kazakhstan | 8 | 15 | 25 | 38 | 78 | 9 | 2 | 3 | 4 | 9 | 17 | 17 | 28 | 42 | 87 |
| Kenya | 16 | 39 | 45 | 40 | 124 | 5 | 0 | 0 | 0 | 0 | 21 | 39 | 45 | 40 | 124 |
| North Korea | 11 | 16 | 18 | 27 | 61 | 9 | 0 | 1 | 1 | 2 | 20 | 16 | 19 | 28 | 63 |
| South Korea | 19 | 109 | 100 | 111 | 320 | 20 | 36 | 34 | 19 | 89 | 39 | 145 | 134 | 130 | 409 |
| Kosovo | 3 | 3 | 1 | 1 | 5 | 3 | 0 | 0 | 0 | 0 | 6 | 3 | 1 | 1 | 5 |
| Kuwait | 14 | 0 | 0 | 3 | 3 | 0 | 0 | 0 | 0 | 0 | 14 | 0 | 0 | 3 | 3 |
| Kyrgyzstan | 8 | 0 | 5 | 8 | 13 | 9 | 0 | 0 | 0 | 0 | 17 | 0 | 5 | 8 | 13 |
| Latvia | 13 | 4 | 11 | 6 | 21 | 13 | 1 | 4 | 7 | 12 | 26 | 5 | 15 | 13 | 33 |
| Lebanon | 19 | 0 | 2 | 2 | 4 | 19 | 0 | 0 | 0 | 0 | 38 | 0 | 2 | 2 | 4 |
| Liechtenstein | 19 | 0 | 0 | 0 | 0 | 21 | 2 | 2 | 6 | 10 | 40 | 2 | 2 | 6 | 10 |
| Lithuania | 11 | 6 | 9 | 15 | 30 | 11 | 0 | 0 | 0 | 0 | 22 | 6 | 9 | 15 | 30 |
| Luxembourg^{[O]} | 25 | 1 | 1 | 0 | 2 | 11 | 0 | 2 | 0 | 2 | 36 | 1 | 3 | 0 | 4 |
| Malaysia^{[MAS]} | 15 | 0 | 8 | 7 | 15 | 3 | 0 | 0 | 0 | 0 | 18 | 0 | 8 | 7 | 15 |
| Mauritius | 11 | 0 | 0 | 1 | 1 | 0 | 0 | 0 | 0 | 0 | 11 | 0 | 0 | 1 | 1 |
| Mexico | 25 | 13 | 27 | 37 | 77 | 11 | 0 | 0 | 0 | 0 | 36 | 13 | 27 | 37 | 77 |
| Moldova | 8 | 0 | 3 | 7 | 10 | 9 | 0 | 0 | 0 | 0 | 17 | 0 | 3 | 7 | 10 |
| Mongolia | 15 | 2 | 12 | 17 | 31 | 16 | 0 | 0 | 0 | 0 | 31 | 2 | 12 | 17 | 31 |
| Montenegro | 5 | 0 | 1 | 0 | 1 | 5 | 0 | 0 | 0 | 0 | 10 | 0 | 1 | 0 | 1 |
| Morocco | 16 | 8 | 5 | 13 | 26 | 9 | 0 | 0 | 0 | 0 | 25 | 8 | 5 | 13 | 26 |
| Mozambique | 12 | 1 | 0 | 1 | 2 | 0 | 0 | 0 | 0 | 0 | 12 | 1 | 0 | 1 | 2 |
| Namibia | 9 | 0 | 5 | 0 | 5 | 0 | 0 | 0 | 0 | 0 | 9 | 0 | 5 | 0 | 5 |
| Netherlands^{[Z]} | 28 | 111 | 112 | 134 | 357 | 23 | 63 | 56 | 48 | 167 | 51 | 174 | 168 | 182 | 524 |
| Netherlands Antilles^{[AHO]}^{[I]} | 13 | 0 | 1 | 0 | 1 | 2 | 0 | 0 | 0 | 0 | 15 | 0 | 1 | 0 | 1 |
| New Zealand^{[NZL]} | 25 | 63 | 40 | 54 | 157 | 18 | 2 | 4 | 3 | 9 | 43 | 65 | 44 | 57 | 166 |
| Niger | 14 | 0 | 1 | 1 | 2 | 0 | 0 | 0 | 0 | 0 | 14 | 0 | 1 | 1 | 2 |
| Nigeria | 18 | 3 | 11 | 13 | 27 | 3 | 0 | 0 | 0 | 0 | 21 | 3 | 11 | 13 | 27 |
| North Macedonia | 8 | 0 | 1 | 1 | 2 | 8 | 0 | 0 | 0 | 0 | 16 | 0 | 1 | 1 | 2 |
| Norway^{[Q]} | 27 | 63 | 53 | 53 | 169 | 25 | 166 | 146 | 135 | 447 | 52 | 229 | 199 | 188 | 616 |
| Pakistan | 19 | 4 | 3 | 4 | 11 | 5 | 0 | 0 | 0 | 0 | 24 | 4 | 3 | 4 | 11 |
| Panama | 19 | 1 | 1 | 2 | 4 | 0 | 0 | 0 | 0 | 0 | 19 | 1 | 1 | 2 | 4 |
| Paraguay | 14 | 0 | 1 | 0 | 1 | 1 | 0 | 0 | 0 | 0 | 15 | 0 | 1 | 0 | 1 |
| Peru^{[L]} | 20 | 1 | 3 | 1 | 5 | 3 | 0 | 0 | 0 | 0 | 23 | 1 | 3 | 1 | 5 |
| Philippines | 23 | 3 | 5 | 10 | 18 | 7 | 0 | 0 | 0 | 0 | 30 | 3 | 5 | 10 | 18 |
| Poland | 23 | 73 | 93 | 142 | 308 | 25 | 7 | 10 | 10 | 27 | 48 | 80 | 103 | 152 | 335 |
| Portugal | 26 | 6 | 11 | 15 | 32 | 10 | 0 | 0 | 0 | 0 | 36 | 6 | 11 | 15 | 32 |
| Puerto Rico | 20 | 2 | 2 | 8 | 12 | 9 | 0 | 0 | 0 | 0 | 29 | 2 | 2 | 8 | 12 |
| Qatar | 11 | 2 | 2 | 5 | 9 | 0 | 0 | 0 | 0 | 0 | 11 | 2 | 2 | 5 | 9 |
| Refugee Olympic Team | 3 | 0 | 0 | 1 | 1 | 0 | 0 | 0 | 0 | 0 | 3 | 0 | 0 | 1 | 1 |
| Romania | 23 | 93 | 101 | 123 | 317 | 23 | 0 | 0 | 1 | 1 | 46 | 93 | 101 | 124 | 318 |
| Russia^{[RUS]} | 6 | 147 | 124 | 150 | 421 | 6 | 45 | 39 | 34 | 118 | 12 | 192 | 163 | 184 | 539 |
| Russian Empire^{[RU1]} | 3 | 1 | 4 | 3 | 8 | 0 | 0 | 0 | 0 | 0 | 3 | 1 | 4 | 3 | 8 |
| Soviet Union^{[URS]} | 9 | 395 | 319 | 296 | 1010 | 9 | 78 | 57 | 59 | 194 | 18 | 473 | 376 | 355 | 1204 |
| Unified Team^{[EUN]} | 1 | 45 | 38 | 29 | 112 | 1 | 9 | 6 | 8 | 23 | 2 | 54 | 44 | 37 | 135 |
| Olympic Athletes from Russia^{[OAR]} | 0 | 0 | 0 | 0 | 0 | 1 | 2 | 6 | 9 | 17 | 1 | 2 | 6 | 9 | 17 |
| ROC (ROC)^{[ROC]} | 1 | 20 | 28 | 23 | 71 | 1 | 5 | 12 | 15 | 32 | 2 | 25 | 40 | 38 | 103 |
| Saint Lucia | 8 | 1 | 1 | 0 | 2 | 0 | 0 | 0 | 0 | 0 | 8 | 1 | 1 | 0 | 2 |
| Samoa | 11 | 0 | 1 | 0 | 1 | 0 | 0 | 0 | 0 | 0 | 11 | 0 | 1 | 0 | 1 |
| San Marino | 16 | 0 | 1 | 2 | 3 | 12 | 0 | 0 | 0 | 0 | 28 | 0 | 1 | 2 | 3 |
| Saudi Arabia | 13 | 0 | 2 | 2 | 4 | 2 | 0 | 0 | 0 | 0 | 15 | 0 | 2 | 2 | 4 |
| Senegal | 16 | 0 | 1 | 0 | 1 | 5 | 0 | 0 | 0 | 0 | 21 | 0 | 1 | 0 | 1 |
| Serbia^{[SRB]} | 6 | 9 | 8 | 11 | 28 | 5 | 0 | 0 | 0 | 0 | 11 | 9 | 8 | 11 | 28 |
| Serbia and Montenegro^{[YUG/SCG]} | 3 | 2 | 4 | 3 | 9 | 3 | 0 | 0 | 0 | 0 | 6 | 2 | 4 | 3 | 9 |
| Singapore | 18 | 1 | 2 | 3 | 6 | 2 | 0 | 0 | 0 | 0 | 20 | 1 | 2 | 3 | 6 |
| Slovakia^{[SVK]} | 8 | 10 | 14 | 9 | 33 | 9 | 4 | 5 | 1 | 10 | 17 | 14 | 19 | 10 | 43 |
| Slovenia | 9 | 10 | 10 | 11 | 31 | 10 | 6 | 9 | 13 | 28 | 19 | 16 | 19 | 24 | 59 |
| South Africa | 21 | 28 | 36 | 31 | 95 | 8 | 0 | 0 | 0 | 0 | 29 | 28 | 36 | 31 | 95 |
| Spain^{[Z]} | 25 | 53 | 76 | 58 | 187 | 22 | 2 | 1 | 5 | 8 | 47 | 55 | 77 | 63 | 195 |
| Sri Lanka^{[SRI]} | 19 | 0 | 2 | 0 | 2 | 0 | 0 | 0 | 0 | 0 | 19 | 0 | 2 | 0 | 2 |
| Sudan | 14 | 0 | 1 | 0 | 1 | 0 | 0 | 0 | 0 | 0 | 14 | 0 | 1 | 0 | 1 |
| Suriname^{[E]} | 14 | 1 | 0 | 1 | 2 | 0 | 0 | 0 | 0 | 0 | 14 | 1 | 0 | 1 | 2 |
| Sweden^{[Z]} | 29 | 151 | 181 | 182 | 514 | 25 | 73 | 57 | 65 | 195 | 54 | 224 | 238 | 247 | 709 |
| Switzerland | 29 | 53 | 82 | 77 | 212 | 25 | 69 | 56 | 66 | 191 | 54 | 122 | 138 | 143 | 403 |
| Syria | 15 | 1 | 1 | 2 | 4 | 0 | 0 | 0 | 0 | 0 | 15 | 1 | 1 | 2 | 4 |
| Tajikistan | 8 | 1 | 1 | 5 | 7 | 4 | 0 | 0 | 0 | 0 | 12 | 1 | 1 | 5 | 7 |
| Tanzania^{[TAN]} | 15 | 0 | 2 | 0 | 2 | 0 | 0 | 0 | 0 | 0 | 15 | 0 | 2 | 0 | 2 |
| Thailand | 18 | 11 | 11 | 19 | 41 | 6 | 0 | 0 | 0 | 0 | 24 | 11 | 11 | 19 | 41 |
| Togo | 12 | 0 | 0 | 1 | 1 | 2 | 0 | 0 | 0 | 0 | 14 | 0 | 0 | 1 | 1 |
| Tonga | 11 | 0 | 1 | 0 | 1 | 2 | 0 | 0 | 0 | 0 | 13 | 0 | 1 | 0 | 1 |
| Trinidad and Tobago^{[TTO]} | 19 | 3 | 5 | 11 | 19 | 5 | 0 | 0 | 0 | 0 | 24 | 3 | 5 | 11 | 19 |
| Tunisia | 16 | 6 | 4 | 8 | 18 | 0 | 0 | 0 | 0 | 0 | 16 | 6 | 4 | 8 | 18 |
| Turkey | 24 | 41 | 29 | 41 | 111 | 19 | 0 | 0 | 0 | 0 | 43 | 41 | 29 | 41 | 111 |
| Turkmenistan | 8 | 0 | 1 | 0 | 1 | 0 | 0 | 0 | 0 | 0 | 8 | 0 | 1 | 0 | 1 |
| Uganda | 17 | 5 | 5 | 3 | 13 | 0 | 0 | 0 | 0 | 0 | 17 | 5 | 5 | 3 | 13 |
| Ukraine | 8 | 38 | 41 | 72 | 151 | 9 | 3 | 2 | 4 | 9 | 17 | 41 | 43 | 76 | 160 |
| United Arab Emirates | 11 | 1 | 0 | 1 | 2 | 1 | 0 | 0 | 0 | 0 | 12 | 1 | 0 | 1 | 2 |
| United States^{[P]}^{[Q]}^{[R]}^{[Z]}^{[F]} | 29 | 1106 | 880 | 788 | 2774 | 25 | 126 | 133 | 104 | 363 | 54 | 1232 | 1013 | 892 | 3137 |
| Uruguay | 23 | 2 | 2 | 6 | 10 | 2 | 0 | 0 | 0 | 0 | 25 | 2 | 2 | 6 | 10 |
| Uzbekistan | 8 | 18 | 8 | 23 | 49 | 9 | 1 | 0 | 0 | 1 | 17 | 19 | 8 | 23 | 50 |
| Venezuela | 20 | 3 | 7 | 9 | 19 | 5 | 0 | 0 | 0 | 0 | 25 | 3 | 7 | 9 | 19 |
| Vietnam | 17 | 1 | 3 | 1 | 5 | 0 | 0 | 0 | 0 | 0 | 17 | 1 | 3 | 1 | 5 |
| Virgin Islands | 14 | 0 | 1 | 0 | 1 | 8 | 0 | 0 | 0 | 0 | 22 | 0 | 1 | 0 | 1 |
| Yugoslavia^{[YUG to 1992]} | 16 | 26 | 29 | 28 | 83 | 14 | 0 | 3 | 1 | 4 | 30 | 26 | 32 | 29 | 87 |
| Zambia^{[ZAM]} | 15 | 0 | 1 | 2 | 3 | 0 | 0 | 0 | 0 | 0 | 15 | 0 | 1 | 2 | 3 |
| Zimbabwe^{[ZIM]} | 15 | 3 | 4 | 1 | 8 | 1 | 0 | 0 | 0 | 0 | 16 | 3 | 4 | 1 | 8 |
| Individual Neutral Athletes^{[AIN]} | 1 | 1 | 3 | 1 | 5 | 1 | 0 | 1 | 0 | 1 | 2 | 1 | 4 | 1 | 6 |
| Independent Olympic Athletes^{[IOA]} | 3 | 1 | 0 | 1 | 2 | 0 | 0 | 0 | 0 | 0 | 3 | 1 | 0 | 1 | 2 |
| Independent Olympic Participants^{[IOP]} | 1 | 0 | 1 | 2 | 3 | 1 | 0 | 0 | 0 | 0 | 2 | 0 | 1 | 2 | 3 |
| Mixed team^{[ZZX]} | 3 | 3 | 2 | 4 | 9 | 1 | 1 | 0 | 0 | 1 | 4 | 4 | 2 | 4 | 10 |
| Totals | 30 | 5,789 | 5,759 | 6,277 | 17,825 | 25 | 1,288 | 1,287 | 1,275 | 3,850 | 55 | 7,077 | 7,046 | 7,552 | 21,675 |

The sum total of gold, silver, and bronze medals are not equal for the following reasons:

- Some sports (such as boxing, judo, karate, taekwondo, and wrestling) award or have previously awarded two bronze medals per competition.
- Team sports medals, such as in football or basketball count as one, even if there are multiple players on each team, who get a medal.
- Some tied performances have resulted in multiple medals of the same colour being awarded for an event. If this tie is for gold or silver, there will be a consequent absence of a silver or bronze medal for that event.
- Some medals that have been revoked have not been re-awarded.
- Some early events, such as cricket at the 1900 Summer Olympics, had only two entrants.
- Retroactively awarding gold, silver, and bronze medals for the 1896 and 1900 games results in some anomalies, such as the 100 metre freestyle swimming event in 1896 where no surviving records distinguish the places of those who finished between 3rd and 10th position.

== List of NOCs without medals (sortable & unranked) ==
After completion of the 2026 Winter Olympics, 64 of the current 206 National Olympic Committees have yet to win an Olympic medal. Seven historic National Olympic Committees are also included in this list.

| Team (IOC code) | No. Summer | No. Winter | No. Games |
|---|---|---|---|
| American Samoa | 10 | 2 | 12 |
| Andorra | 13 | 14 | 27 |
| Angola | 11 | 0 | 11 |
| Antigua and Barbuda | 12 | 0 | 12 |
| Aruba | 10 | 0 | 10 |
| Bangladesh | 11 | 0 | 11 |
| Belize^{[BIZ]} | 14 | 0 | 14 |
| Benin^{[BEN]} | 13 | 1 | 14 |
| Bhutan | 11 | 0 | 11 |
| Bolivia | 16 | 8 | 24 |
| Bosnia and Herzegovina | 9 | 9 | 18 |
| British Virgin Islands | 11 | 2 | 13 |
| Brunei^{[A]} | 7 | 0 | 7 |
| Cambodia | 11 | 0 | 11 |
| Cayman Islands | 12 | 2 | 14 |
| Central African Republic | 12 | 0 | 12 |
| Chad | 14 | 0 | 14 |
| Comoros | 8 | 0 | 8 |
| Republic of the Congo | 14 | 0 | 14 |
| Democratic Republic of the Congo^{[COD]} | 12 | 0 | 12 |
| Cook Islands | 10 | 0 | 10 |
| El Salvador | 13 | 0 | 13 |
| Eswatini^{[SWZ]} | 12 | 1 | 13 |
| Equatorial Guinea | 11 | 0 | 11 |
| The Gambia | 11 | 0 | 11 |
| Guam | 10 | 1 | 11 |
| Guinea | 13 | 0 | 13 |
| Guinea-Bissau | 8 | 1 | 9 |
| Honduras | 13 | 1 | 14 |
| Kiribati | 6 | 0 | 6 |
| Laos | 11 | 0 | 11 |
| Lesotho | 13 | 0 | 13 |
| Liberia^{[C]} | 14 | 0 | 14 |
| Libya^{[D]} | 12 | 0 | 12 |
| Madagascar | 14 | 4 | 18 |
| Malawi | 12 | 0 | 12 |
| Maldives | 10 | 0 | 10 |
| Mali | 15 | 0 | 15 |
| Malta | 18 | 4 | 22 |
| Marshall Islands | 5 | 0 | 5 |
| Mauritania | 11 | 0 | 11 |
| Federated States of Micronesia | 7 | 0 | 7 |
| Monaco^{[N]} | 22 | 12 | 34 |
| Myanmar^{[MYA]} | 19 | 0 | 19 |
| Nauru | 8 | 0 | 8 |
| Nepal (Note: Tejbir Bura was the first and only Nepalese person to receive an Olympic gold medal. During the 1924 Winter Olympic closing ceremony, the IOC awarded a gold medal in alpinism for the 1922 British Mount Everest expedition, which recognized 21 mountaineers, including the first athletes to be awarded medals posthumously, seven Indian sherpas who were killed in an avalanche on the third and last attempt to summit.) | 15 | 4 | 19 |
| Nicaragua | 14 | 0 | 14 |
| Oman | 11 | 0 | 11 |
| Palau | 7 | 0 | 7 |
| Palestine | 8 | 0 | 8 |
| Papua New Guinea | 12 | 0 | 12 |
| Rwanda | 11 | 0 | 11 |
| Saint Kitts and Nevis | 8 | 0 | 8 |
| Saint Vincent and the Grenadines | 10 | 0 | 10 |
| São Tomé and Príncipe | 8 | 0 | 8 |
| Seychelles | 11 | 0 | 11 |
| Sierra Leone | 13 | 0 | 13 |
| Solomon Islands | 11 | 0 | 11 |
| Somalia | 11 | 0 | 11 |
| South Sudan | 3 | 0 | 3 |
| Timor-Leste^{[I]} | 6 | 3 | 9 |
| Tuvalu | 5 | 0 | 5 |
| Vanuatu | 10 | 0 | 10 |
| Yemen^{[YEM]} | 9 | 0 | 9 |
| Korea | 0 | 1 | 1 |
| (Federation of Malaya) Malaya (MAL)^{[MAL]} | 2 | 0 | 2 |
| North Borneo^{[NBO]} | 1 | 0 | 1 |
| Republic of China^{[ROC]} | 3 | 0 | 3 |
| Saar^{[SAA]} | 1 | 0 | 1 |
| North Yemen^{[YAR]} | 2 | 0 | 2 |
| South Yemen^{[YMD]} | 1 | 0 | 1 |

== List of defunct historical NOCs and special delegations with medals (sortable & unranked) ==
=== Defunct historical NOCs with medals ===
A total of 10 defunct historical NOCs have earned at least one medal.

| Team | Summer Olympic Games | | | | | Winter Olympic Games | | | | | Combined total | | | | |
| Team (IOC code) | No. | Gold medal | Silver medal | Bronze medal | | No. | Gold medal | Silver medal | Bronze medal | | No. | Gold medal | Silver medal | Bronze medal | |
|---|---|---|---|---|---|---|---|---|---|---|---|---|---|---|---|
| Bohemia^{[BOH]}^{[Z]} | 3 | 0 | 1 | 3 | 4 | 0 | 0 | 0 | 0 | 0 | 3 | 0 | 1 | 3 | 4 |
| British West Indies^{[BWI]} | 1 | 0 | 0 | 2 | 2 | 0 | 0 | 0 | 0 | 0 | 1 | 0 | 0 | 2 | 2 |
| Czechoslovakia^{[TCH]} | 16 | 49 | 49 | 45 | 143 | 16 | 2 | 8 | 15 | 25 | 32 | 51 | 57 | 60 | 168 |
| East Germany^{[GDR]} | 5 | 153 | 129 | 127 | 409 | 6 | 39 | 36 | 35 | 110 | 11 | 192 | 165 | 162 | 519 |
| West Germany^{[FRG]} | 5 | 56 | 67 | 81 | 204 | 6 | 11 | 15 | 13 | 39 | 11 | 67 | 82 | 94 | 243 |
| Netherlands Antilles^{[AHO]}^{[I]} | 13 | 0 | 1 | 0 | 1 | 2 | 0 | 0 | 0 | 0 | 15 | 0 | 1 | 0 | 1 |
| Russian Empire^{[RU1]} | 3 | 1 | 4 | 3 | 8 | 0 | 0 | 0 | 0 | 0 | 3 | 1 | 4 | 3 | 8 |
| Soviet Union^{[URS]} | 9 | 395 | 319 | 296 | 1,010 | 9 | 78 | 57 | 59 | 194 | 18 | 473 | 376 | 355 | 1,204 |
| Serbia and Montenegro^{[YUG/SCG]} | 3 | 2 | 4 | 3 | 9 | 3 | 0 | 0 | 0 | 0 | 6 | 2 | 4 | 3 | 9 |
| Yugoslavia^{[YUG to 1992]} | 16 | 26 | 29 | 28 | 83 | 14 | 0 | 3 | 1 | 4 | 30 | 26 | 32 | 29 | 87 |
| Totals | 24 | 682 | 603 | 588 | 1,873 | 19 | 130 | 119 | 123 | 372 | 43 | 812 | 722 | 711 | 2,245 |

=== Special delegations with medals ===
As of completion of the 2026 Winter Olympics, a total of 10 special delegations have earned at least one medal. Medal totals in this table include the changes in medal standings due to doping cases and medal redistributions adjudicated up to 19 September 2025.

Special delegation, not an actual nation

| Team | Summer Olympic Games | | | | | Winter Olympic Games | | | | | Combined total | | | | |
| Team (IOC code) | No. | Gold medal | Silver medal | Bronze medal | | No. | Gold medal | Silver medal | Bronze medal | | No. | Gold medal | Silver medal | Bronze medal | |
|---|---|---|---|---|---|---|---|---|---|---|---|---|---|---|---|
| Australasia^{[ANZ]} | 2 | 3 | 4 | 5 | 12 | 0 | 0 | 0 | 0 | 0 | 2 | 3 | 4 | 5 | 12 |
| Individual Neutral Athletes^{[AIN]} | 1 | 1 | 3 | 1 | 5 | 1 | 0 | 1 | 0 | 1 | 2 | 1 | 4 | 1 | 6 |
| Refugee Olympic Team^{[EOR]} | 3 | 0 | 0 | 1 | 1 | 0 | 0 | 0 | 0 | 0 | 3 | 0 | 0 | 1 | 1 |
| United Team of Germany^{[EUA]} | 3 | 28 | 54 | 36 | 118 | 3 | 8 | 6 | 5 | 19 | 6 | 36 | 60 | 41 | 137 |
| Unified Team^{[EUN]} | 1 | 45 | 38 | 29 | 112 | 1 | 9 | 6 | 8 | 23 | 2 | 54 | 44 | 37 | 135 |
| Olympic Athletes from Russia^{[OAR]} | 0 | 0 | 0 | 0 | 0 | 1 | 2 | 6 | 9 | 17 | 1 | 2 | 6 | 9 | 17 |
| ROC (ROC)^{[ROC]} | 1 | 20 | 28 | 23 | 71 | 1 | 5 | 12 | 15 | 32 | 2 | 25 | 40 | 38 | 103 |
| Independent Olympic Athletes^{[IOA]} | 3 | 1 | 0 | 1 | 2 | 0 | 0 | 0 | 0 | 0 | 3 | 1 | 0 | 1 | 2 |
| Independent Olympic Participants^{[IOP]} | 1 | 0 | 1 | 2 | 3 | 1 | 0 | 0 | 0 | 0 | 2 | 0 | 1 | 2 | 3 |
| Mixed team^{[ZZX]} | 3 | 11 | 6 | 8 | 25 | 0 | 0 | 0 | 0 | 0 | 3 | 11 | 6 | 8 | 25 |
| Totals | 18 | 109 | 134 | 106 | 349 | 8 | 24 | 31 | 37 | 92 | 26 | 133 | 165 | 143 | 441 |

== Top ten medal rankings (combined NOCs) ==
The following is the overall medal tally (top ten nations) with the records of current NOCs combined with those of their precursors (sorted by gold, then silver, then bronze), through 2026.

=== Summer Olympics (including precursors) ===
Current NOCs combined with records of precursor NOCs and special delegations:

| No. | Nation | Gold | Silver | Bronze | Total |
|---|---|---|---|---|---|
| 1 | United States | 1,106 | 880 | 788 | 2,774 |
| 2 | Russia (Note: incl. Russian Empire (RU1), Soviet Union (URS), Unified Team (EUN), Russian Olympic Committee (ROC), Individual Neutral Athletes (AIN, 1 medal)) | 608 | 514 | 501 | 1,623 |
| 3 | Germany (Note: incl. United Team of Germany (EUA), West Germany (FRG), East Germany (GDR)) | 451 | 469 | 498 | 1,418 |
| 4 | Great Britain | 303 | 340 | 343 | 986 |
| 5 | China | 303 | 226 | 198 | 727 |
| 6 | France | 243 | 279 | 302 | 824 |
| 7 | Italy | 229 | 201 | 221 | 651 |
| 8 | Japan | 189 | 162 | 191 | 542 |
| 9 | Hungary | 187 | 161 | 182 | 530 |
| 10 | Australia (Note: not included Australasia (ANZ)) | 180 | 189 | 225 | 594 |

=== Summer Olympics (excluding precursors) ===
Separate current and precursor NOCs (records not combined):

| No. | Nation | Gold | Silver | Bronze | Total |
|---|---|---|---|---|---|
| 1 | United States | 1,106 | 880 | 788 | 2,774 |
| 2 | Soviet Union | 395 | 319 | 296 | 1,010 |
| 3 | Great Britain | 303 | 340 | 343 | 986 |
| 4 | China | 303 | 226 | 198 | 727 |
| 5 | France | 243 | 279 | 302 | 824 |
| 6 | Italy | 229 | 201 | 221 | 651 |
| 7 | Germany | 214 | 219 | 254 | 687 |
| 8 | Japan | 189 | 162 | 191 | 542 |
| 9 | Hungary | 187 | 161 | 182 | 530 |
| 10 | Australia | 180 | 189 | 225 | 594 |

=== Winter Olympics (including precursors) ===
Current NOCs combined with records of precursor NOCs:

| No. | Nation | Gold | Silver | Bronze | Total |
|---|---|---|---|---|---|
| 1 | Germany (Note: incl. United Team of Germany (EUA), West Germany (FRG), East Germany (GDR)) | 171 | 164 | 126 | 461 |
| 2 | Norway | 166 | 146 | 135 | 447 |
| 3 | Russia (Note: incl. Soviet Union (URS), Unified Team (EUN), Olympic Athletes from Russia (OAR), Russian Olympic Committee (ROC), Individual Neutral Athletes (AIN, 1 medal)) | 139 | 121 | 125 | 384 |
| 4 | United States | 126 | 133 | 104 | 363 |
| 5 | Canada | 82 | 79 | 85 | 246 |
| 6 | Austria | 76 | 97 | 96 | 269 |
| 7 | Sweden | 73 | 57 | 65 | 195 |
| 8 | Switzerland | 69 | 56 | 66 | 191 |
| 9 | Netherlands | 63 | 56 | 48 | 167 |
| 10 | Italy | 52 | 49 | 70 | 171 |

=== Winter Olympics (excluding precursors) ===
Separate current and precursor NOCs (records not combined):

| No. | Nation | Gold | Silver | Bronze | Total |
|---|---|---|---|---|---|
| 1 | Norway | 166 | 146 | 135 | 447 |
| 2 | United States | 126 | 133 | 104 | 363 |
| 3 | Germany | 113 | 107 | 73 | 293 |
| 4 | Canada | 82 | 79 | 85 | 246 |
| 5 | Soviet Union | 78 | 57 | 59 | 194 |
| 6 | Austria | 76 | 97 | 96 | 269 |
| 7 | Sweden | 73 | 57 | 65 | 195 |
| 8 | Switzerland | 69 | 56 | 66 | 191 |
| 9 | Netherlands | 63 | 56 | 48 | 167 |
| 10 | Italy | 52 | 49 | 70 | 171 |

=== Total, all Olympics (including precursors) ===
Current NOCs combined with records of precursor NOCs:

| No. | Nation | Gold | Silver | Bronze | Total |
|---|---|---|---|---|---|
| 1 | United States | 1,232 | 1,013 | 892 | 3,137 |
| 2 | Russia (Note: incl. Russian Empire (RU1), Soviet Union (URS), Unified Team (EUN), Olympic Athletes from Russia (OAR), Russian Olympic Committee (ROC), Individual Neutral Athletes (AIN)) | 747 | 635 | 626 | 2,008 |
| 3 | Germany (Note: incl. United Team of Germany (EUA), West Germany (FRG), East Germany (GDR)) | 622 | 633 | 624 | 1,879 |
| 4 | China | 330 | 262 | 227 | 819 |
| 5 | Great Britain | 318 | 346 | 361 | 1,025 |
| 6 | France | 293 | 329 | 363 | 985 |
| 7 | Italy | 281 | 250 | 298 | 829 |
| 8 | Norway | 229 | 199 | 188 | 616 |
| 9 | Sweden | 224 | 238 | 247 | 709 |
| 10 | Japan | 211 | 198 | 233 | 642 |

=== Total, all Olympics (excluding precursors) ===
Separate current and precursor NOCs (records not combined):

| No. | Nation | Gold | Silver | Bronze | Total |
|---|---|---|---|---|---|
| 1 | United States | 1,232 | 1,013 | 892 | 3,137 |
| 2 | Soviet Union | 473 | 376 | 355 | 1,204 |
| 3 | China | 330 | 262 | 227 | 819 |
| 4 | Germany | 327 | 326 | 327 | 980 |
| 5 | Great Britain | 318 | 346 | 361 | 1,025 |
| 6 | France | 293 | 329 | 363 | 985 |
| 7 | Italy | 281 | 250 | 298 | 829 |
| 8 | Norway | 229 | 199 | 188 | 616 |
| 9 | Sweden | 224 | 238 | 247 | 709 |
| 10 | Japan | 211 | 198 | 233 | 642 |

== Complete ranked medals (excluding precursors) ==
=== Summer Olympics (1896–2024) ===
| Rank | NOC | Gold | Silver | Bronze | Total |
|---|---|---|---|---|---|
| 1 | United States | 1,106 | 880 | 788 | 2,774 |
| 2 | Soviet Union* | 395 | 319 | 296 | 1,010 |
| 3 | Great Britain | 303 | 340 | 343 | 986 |
| 4 | China | 303 | 226 | 198 | 727 |
| 5 | France | 243 | 279 | 302 | 824 |
| 6 | Italy | 229 | 201 | 228 | 658 |
| 7 | Germany | 214 | 219 | 254 | 687 |
| 8 | Japan | 189 | 162 | 191 | 542 |
| 9 | Hungary | 187 | 161 | 182 | 530 |
| 10 | Australia | 180 | 189 | 225 | 594 |
| 11 | East Germany* | 153 | 129 | 127 | 409 |
| 12 | Sweden | 151 | 181 | 182 | 514 |
| 13 | Russia | 147 | 124 | 150 | 421 |
| 14 | Netherlands | 111 | 112 | 134 | 357 |
| 15 | South Korea | 109 | 100 | 111 | 320 |
| 16 | Finland | 101 | 85 | 119 | 305 |
| 17 | Romania | 93 | 101 | 123 | 317 |
| 18 | Cuba | 86 | 70 | 88 | 244 |
| 19 | Canada | 79 | 117 | 155 | 351 |
| 20 | Poland | 73 | 93 | 142 | 308 |
| 21 | Norway | 63 | 53 | 53 | 169 |
| 22 | New Zealand | 63 | 40 | 54 | 157 |
| 23 | Bulgaria | 57 | 89 | 85 | 231 |
| 24 | West Germany* | 56 | 67 | 81 | 204 |
| 25 | Switzerland | 53 | 82 | 77 | 212 |
| 26 | Spain | 53 | 76 | 58 | 187 |
| 27 | Denmark | 50 | 80 | 84 | 214 |
| 28 | Czechoslovakia* | 49 | 49 | 45 | 143 |
| 29 | Belgium | 47 | 57 | 64 | 168 |
| 30 | Unified Team* | 45 | 38 | 29 | 112 |
| 31 | Turkey | 41 | 29 | 41 | 111 |
| 32 | Brazil | 40 | 49 | 81 | 170 |
| 33 | Kenya | 39 | 45 | 40 | 124 |
| 34 | Ukraine | 38 | 41 | 72 | 151 |
| 35 | Greece | 36 | 46 | 47 | 129 |
| 36 | United Team of Germany* | 28 | 54 | 36 | 118 |
| 37 | South Africa | 28 | 36 | 31 | 95 |
| 38 | Jamaica | 27 | 39 | 28 | 94 |
| 39 | Iran | 27 | 29 | 32 | 88 |
| 40 | Yugoslavia* | 26 | 29 | 28 | 83 |
| 41 | Ethiopia | 24 | 16 | 22 | 62 |
| 42 | Argentina | 22 | 27 | 31 | 80 |
| 43 | Czech Republic | 22 | 22 | 28 | 72 |
| 44 | Austria | 21 | 34 | 43 | 98 |
| 45 | ROC* | 20 | 28 | 23 | 71 |
| 46 | Uzbekistan | 18 | 8 | 23 | 49 |
| 47 | North Korea | 16 | 18 | 27 | 61 |
| 48 | Croatia | 16 | 15 | 18 | 49 |
| 49 | Kazakhstan | 15 | 25 | 38 | 78 |
| 50 | Ireland | 15 | 10 | 17 | 42 |
| 51 | Belarus | 13 | 30 | 42 | 85 |
| 52 | Mexico | 13 | 27 | 37 | 77 |
| 53 | Georgia | 13 | 15 | 19 | 47 |
| 54 | Thailand | 11 | 11 | 19 | 41 |
| 55 | Indonesia | 10 | 14 | 16 | 40 |
| 56 | Slovakia | 10 | 14 | 9 | 33 |
| 57 | India | 10 | 10 | 21 | 41 |
| 58 | Slovenia | 10 | 10 | 11 | 31 |
| 59 | Estonia | 10 | 9 | 17 | 36 |
| 60 | Azerbaijan | 9 | 16 | 31 | 56 |
| 61 | Egypt | 9 | 12 | 20 | 41 |
| 62 | Chinese Taipei | 9 | 11 | 23 | 43 |
| 63 | Serbia | 9 | 8 | 11 | 28 |
| 64 | Morocco | 8 | 5 | 13 | 26 |
| 65 | Bahamas | 8 | 2 | 6 | 16 |
| 66 | Algeria | 7 | 4 | 9 | 20 |
| 67 | Portugal | 6 | 11 | 15 | 32 |
| 68 | Lithuania | 6 | 9 | 15 | 30 |
| 69 | Tunisia | 6 | 4 | 8 | 18 |
| 70 | Colombia | 5 | 16 | 17 | 38 |
| 71 | Uganda | 5 | 5 | 3 | 13 |
| 72 | Latvia | 4 | 11 | 6 | 21 |
| 73 | Israel | 4 | 6 | 10 | 20 |
| 74 | Dominican Republic | 4 | 5 | 6 | 15 |
| 75 | Ecuador | 4 | 4 | 2 | 10 |
| 76 | Hong Kong | 4 | 3 | 6 | 13 |
| 77 | Pakistan | 4 | 3 | 4 | 11 |
| 78 | Bahrain | 4 | 3 | 1 | 8 |
| 79 | Nigeria | 3 | 11 | 13 | 27 |
| 80 | Chile | 3 | 8 | 4 | 15 |
| 81 | Venezuela | 3 | 7 | 9 | 19 |
| 82 | Trinidad and Tobago | 3 | 5 | 11 | 19 |
| 83 | Philippines | 3 | 5 | 10 | 18 |
| 84 | Australasia* | 3 | 4 | 5 | 12 |
| 85 | Zimbabwe | 3 | 4 | 1 | 8 |
| 86 | Mixed team* | 3 | 2 | 4 | 9 |
| 87 | Cameroon | 3 | 1 | 2 | 6 |
| 88 | Kosovo | 3 | 1 | 1 | 5 |
| 89 | Mongolia | 2 | 12 | 17 | 31 |
| 90 | Armenia | 2 | 11 | 9 | 22 |
| 91 | Serbia and Montenegro* | 2 | 4 | 3 | 9 |
| 92 | Puerto Rico | 2 | 2 | 8 | 12 |
| 93 | Uruguay | 2 | 2 | 6 | 10 |
| 94 | Qatar | 2 | 2 | 5 | 9 |
| 95 | Fiji | 2 | 1 | 1 | 4 |
| 96 | Russian Empire* | 1 | 4 | 3 | 8 |
| 97 | Individual Neutral Athletes* | 1 | 3 | 1 | 5 |
| 97 | Peru | 1 | 3 | 1 | 5 |
| 97 | Vietnam | 1 | 3 | 1 | 5 |
| 100 | Singapore | 1 | 2 | 3 | 6 |
| 101 | Botswana | 1 | 2 | 1 | 4 |
| 101 | Jordan | 1 | 2 | 1 | 4 |
| 103 | Tajikistan | 1 | 1 | 5 | 7 |
| 104 | Grenada | 1 | 1 | 3 | 5 |
| 104 | Ivory Coast | 1 | 1 | 3 | 5 |
| 106 | Costa Rica | 1 | 1 | 2 | 4 |
| 106 | Panama | 1 | 1 | 2 | 4 |
| 106 | Syria | 1 | 1 | 2 | 4 |
| 109 | Guatemala | 1 | 1 | 1 | 3 |
| 110 | Burundi | 1 | 1 | 0 | 2 |
| 110 | Luxembourg | 1 | 1 | 0 | 2 |
| 110 | Saint Lucia | 1 | 1 | 0 | 2 |
| 113 | Bermuda | 1 | 0 | 1 | 2 |
| 113 | Independent Olympic Athletes* | 1 | 0 | 1 | 2 |
| 113 | Mozambique | 1 | 0 | 1 | 2 |
| 113 | Suriname | 1 | 0 | 1 | 2 |
| 113 | United Arab Emirates | 1 | 0 | 1 | 2 |
| 118 | Dominica | 1 | 0 | 0 | 1 |
| 119 | Malaysia | 0 | 8 | 7 | 15 |
| 120 | Kyrgyzstan | 0 | 5 | 8 | 13 |
| 121 | Namibia | 0 | 5 | 0 | 5 |
| 122 | Moldova | 0 | 3 | 7 | 10 |
| 123 | Iceland | 0 | 2 | 2 | 4 |
| 123 | Lebanon | 0 | 2 | 2 | 4 |
| 123 | Saudi Arabia | 0 | 2 | 2 | 4 |
| 126 | Cyprus | 0 | 2 | 0 | 2 |
| 126 | Sri Lanka | 0 | 2 | 0 | 2 |
| 126 | Tanzania | 0 | 2 | 0 | 2 |
| 129 | Ghana | 0 | 1 | 4 | 5 |
| 130 | Bohemia* | 0 | 1 | 3 | 4 |
| 131 | Independent Olympic Participants* | 0 | 1 | 2 | 3 |
| 131 | San Marino | 0 | 1 | 2 | 3 |
| 131 | Zambia | 0 | 1 | 2 | 3 |
| 134 | Haiti | 0 | 1 | 1 | 2 |
| 134 | Niger | 0 | 1 | 1 | 2 |
| 134 | North Macedonia | 0 | 1 | 1 | 2 |
| 137 | Gabon | 0 | 1 | 0 | 1 |
| 137 | Montenegro | 0 | 1 | 0 | 1 |
| 137 | Netherlands Antilles* | 0 | 1 | 0 | 1 |
| 137 | Paraguay | 0 | 1 | 0 | 1 |
| 137 | Samoa | 0 | 1 | 0 | 1 |
| 137 | Senegal | 0 | 1 | 0 | 1 |
| 137 | Sudan | 0 | 1 | 0 | 1 |
| 137 | Tonga | 0 | 1 | 0 | 1 |
| 137 | Turkmenistan | 0 | 1 | 0 | 1 |
| 137 | Virgin Islands | 0 | 1 | 0 | 1 |
| 147 | Kuwait | 0 | 0 | 3 | 3 |
| 148 | Afghanistan | 0 | 0 | 2 | 2 |
| 148 | Albania | 0 | 0 | 2 | 2 |
| 148 | British West Indies* | 0 | 0 | 2 | 2 |
| 151 | Barbados | 0 | 0 | 1 | 1 |
| 151 | Burkina Faso | 0 | 0 | 1 | 1 |
| 151 | Cape Verde | 0 | 0 | 1 | 1 |
| 151 | Djibouti | 0 | 0 | 1 | 1 |
| 151 | Eritrea | 0 | 0 | 1 | 1 |
| 151 | Guyana | 0 | 0 | 1 | 1 |
| 151 | Iraq | 0 | 0 | 1 | 1 |
| 151 | Mauritius | 0 | 0 | 1 | 1 |
| 151 | Refugee Olympic Team* | 0 | 0 | 1 | 1 |
| 151 | Togo | 0 | 0 | 1 | 1 |
| Totals (160 entries) | | 5,789 | 5,759 | 6,277 | 17,825 |

=== Winter Olympics (1924–2026) ===
| Rank | NOC | Gold | Silver | Bronze | Total |
|---|---|---|---|---|---|
| 1 | Norway | 166 | 146 | 135 | 447 |
| 2 | United States | 126 | 133 | 104 | 363 |
| 3 | Germany | 113 | 107 | 73 | 293 |
| 4 | Canada | 82 | 79 | 85 | 246 |
| 5 | Soviet Union* | 78 | 57 | 59 | 194 |
| 6 | Austria | 76 | 97 | 96 | 269 |
| 7 | Sweden | 73 | 57 | 65 | 195 |
| 8 | Switzerland | 69 | 56 | 66 | 191 |
| 9 | Netherlands | 63 | 56 | 48 | 167 |
| 10 | Italy | 52 | 49 | 70 | 171 |
| 11 | France | 50 | 50 | 61 | 161 |
| 12 | Finland | 45 | 66 | 70 | 181 |
| 13 | Russia | 45 | 39 | 34 | 118 |
| 14 | East Germany* | 39 | 36 | 35 | 110 |
| 15 | South Korea | 36 | 34 | 19 | 89 |
| 16 | China | 27 | 36 | 29 | 92 |
| 17 | Japan | 22 | 36 | 42 | 100 |
| 18 | Great Britain | 15 | 6 | 18 | 39 |
| 19 | Czech Republic | 12 | 13 | 14 | 39 |
| 20 | West Germany* | 11 | 15 | 13 | 39 |
| 21 | Australia | 9 | 9 | 7 | 25 |
| 22 | Unified Team* | 9 | 6 | 8 | 23 |
| 23 | Belarus | 8 | 7 | 5 | 20 |
| 24 | United Team of Germany* | 8 | 6 | 5 | 19 |
| 25 | Poland | 7 | 10 | 10 | 27 |
| 26 | Slovenia | 6 | 9 | 13 | 28 |
| 27 | ROC* | 5 | 12 | 15 | 32 |
| 28 | Croatia | 4 | 6 | 1 | 11 |
| 29 | Slovakia | 4 | 5 | 1 | 10 |
| 30 | Estonia | 4 | 3 | 2 | 9 |
| 31 | Ukraine | 3 | 2 | 4 | 9 |
| 32 | Czechoslovakia* | 2 | 8 | 15 | 25 |
| 33 | Olympic Athletes from Russia* | 2 | 6 | 9 | 17 |
| 34 | New Zealand | 2 | 4 | 3 | 9 |
| 35 | Kazakhstan | 2 | 3 | 4 | 9 |
| 36 | Hungary | 2 | 2 | 6 | 10 |
| 36 | Liechtenstein | 2 | 2 | 6 | 10 |
| 38 | Belgium | 2 | 2 | 5 | 9 |
| 39 | Spain | 2 | 1 | 5 | 8 |
| 40 | Latvia | 1 | 4 | 7 | 12 |
| 41 | Bulgaria | 1 | 2 | 5 | 8 |
| 42 | Brazil | 1 | 0 | 0 | 1 |
| 42 | Uzbekistan | 1 | 0 | 0 | 1 |
| 44 | Yugoslavia* | 0 | 3 | 1 | 4 |
| 45 | Denmark | 0 | 2 | 0 | 2 |
| 45 | Luxembourg | 0 | 2 | 0 | 2 |
| 47 | North Korea | 0 | 1 | 1 | 2 |
| 48 | Georgia | 0 | 1 | 0 | 1 |
| 48 | Individual Neutral Athletes* | 0 | 1 | 0 | 1 |
| 50 | Romania | 0 | 0 | 1 | 1 |
| Totals (50 entries) | | 1,287 | 1,287 | 1,275 | 3,849 |

=== Combined total (1896–2026) ===
| Rank | NOC | Gold | Silver | Bronze | Total |
|---|---|---|---|---|---|
| 1 | United States | 1,232 | 1,013 | 892 | 3,137 |
| 2 | Soviet Union* | 473 | 376 | 355 | 1,204 |
| 3 | China | 330 | 262 | 227 | 819 |
| 4 | Germany | 327 | 326 | 327 | 980 |
| 5 | Great Britain | 318 | 346 | 361 | 1,025 |
| 6 | France | 293 | 329 | 363 | 985 |
| 7 | Italy | 281 | 250 | 298 | 829 |
| 8 | Norway | 229 | 199 | 188 | 616 |
| 9 | Sweden | 224 | 238 | 247 | 709 |
| 10 | Japan | 211 | 198 | 233 | 642 |
| 11 | East Germany* | 192 | 165 | 162 | 519 |
| 12 | Russia | 192 | 163 | 184 | 539 |
| 13 | Australia | 189 | 198 | 232 | 619 |
| 14 | Hungary | 189 | 163 | 188 | 540 |
| 15 | Netherlands | 174 | 168 | 182 | 524 |
| 16 | Canada | 161 | 196 | 240 | 597 |
| 17 | Finland | 146 | 151 | 189 | 486 |
| 18 | South Korea | 145 | 134 | 130 | 409 |
| 19 | Switzerland | 122 | 138 | 143 | 403 |
| 20 | Austria | 97 | 131 | 139 | 367 |
| 21 | Romania | 93 | 101 | 124 | 318 |
| 22 | Cuba | 86 | 70 | 88 | 244 |
| 23 | Poland | 80 | 103 | 152 | 335 |
| 24 | West Germany* | 67 | 82 | 94 | 243 |
| 25 | New Zealand | 65 | 44 | 57 | 166 |
| 26 | Bulgaria | 58 | 91 | 90 | 239 |
| 27 | Spain | 55 | 77 | 63 | 195 |
| 28 | Unified Team* | 54 | 44 | 37 | 135 |
| 29 | Czechoslovakia* | 51 | 57 | 60 | 168 |
| 30 | Denmark | 50 | 82 | 84 | 216 |
| 31 | Belgium | 49 | 59 | 69 | 177 |
| 32 | Brazil | 41 | 49 | 81 | 171 |
| 33 | Ukraine | 41 | 43 | 76 | 160 |
| 34 | Turkey | 41 | 29 | 41 | 111 |
| 35 | Kenya | 39 | 45 | 40 | 124 |
| 36 | United Team of Germany* | 36 | 60 | 41 | 137 |
| 37 | Greece | 36 | 46 | 47 | 129 |
| 38 | Czech Republic | 34 | 35 | 42 | 111 |
| 39 | South Africa | 28 | 36 | 31 | 95 |
| 40 | Jamaica | 27 | 39 | 28 | 94 |
| 41 | Iran | 27 | 29 | 32 | 88 |
| 42 | Yugoslavia* | 26 | 32 | 29 | 87 |
| 43 | ROC* | 25 | 40 | 38 | 103 |
| 44 | Ethiopia | 24 | 16 | 22 | 62 |
| 45 | Argentina | 22 | 27 | 31 | 80 |
| 46 | Belarus | 21 | 37 | 47 | 105 |
| 47 | Croatia | 20 | 21 | 19 | 60 |
| 48 | Uzbekistan | 19 | 8 | 23 | 50 |
| 49 | Kazakhstan | 17 | 28 | 42 | 87 |
| 50 | North Korea | 16 | 19 | 28 | 63 |
| 51 | Slovenia | 16 | 19 | 24 | 59 |
| 52 | Ireland | 15 | 10 | 17 | 42 |
| 53 | Slovakia | 14 | 19 | 10 | 43 |
| 54 | Estonia | 14 | 12 | 19 | 45 |
| 55 | Mexico | 13 | 27 | 37 | 77 |
| 56 | Georgia | 13 | 16 | 19 | 48 |
| 57 | Thailand | 11 | 11 | 19 | 41 |
| 58 | Indonesia | 10 | 14 | 16 | 40 |
| 59 | India | 10 | 10 | 21 | 41 |
| 60 | Azerbaijan | 9 | 16 | 31 | 56 |
| 61 | Egypt | 9 | 12 | 20 | 41 |
| 62 | Chinese Taipei | 9 | 11 | 23 | 43 |
| 63 | Serbia | 9 | 8 | 11 | 28 |
| 64 | Morocco | 8 | 5 | 13 | 26 |
| 65 | Bahamas | 8 | 2 | 6 | 16 |
| 66 | Algeria | 7 | 4 | 9 | 20 |
| 67 | Portugal | 6 | 11 | 15 | 32 |
| 68 | Lithuania | 6 | 9 | 15 | 30 |
| 69 | Tunisia | 6 | 4 | 8 | 18 |
| 70 | Colombia | 5 | 16 | 17 | 38 |
| 71 | Latvia | 5 | 15 | 13 | 33 |
| 72 | Uganda | 5 | 5 | 3 | 13 |
| 73 | Israel | 4 | 6 | 10 | 20 |
| 74 | Dominican Republic | 4 | 5 | 6 | 15 |
| 75 | Ecuador | 4 | 4 | 2 | 10 |
| 76 | Hong Kong | 4 | 3 | 6 | 13 |
| 77 | Pakistan | 4 | 3 | 4 | 11 |
| 78 | Bahrain | 4 | 3 | 1 | 8 |
| 79 | Mixed team* | 4 | 2 | 4 | 10 |
| 80 | Nigeria | 3 | 11 | 13 | 27 |
| 81 | Chile | 3 | 8 | 4 | 15 |
| 82 | Venezuela | 3 | 7 | 9 | 19 |
| 83 | Trinidad and Tobago | 3 | 5 | 11 | 19 |
| 84 | Philippines | 3 | 5 | 10 | 18 |
| 85 | Australasia* | 3 | 4 | 5 | 12 |
| 86 | Zimbabwe | 3 | 4 | 1 | 8 |
| 87 | Cameroon | 3 | 1 | 2 | 6 |
| 88 | Kosovo | 3 | 1 | 1 | 5 |
| 89 | Mongolia | 2 | 12 | 17 | 31 |
| 90 | Armenia | 2 | 11 | 9 | 22 |
| 91 | Olympic Athletes from Russia* | 2 | 6 | 9 | 17 |
| 92 | Serbia and Montenegro* | 2 | 4 | 3 | 9 |
| 93 | Puerto Rico | 2 | 2 | 8 | 12 |
| 94 | Liechtenstein | 2 | 2 | 6 | 10 |
| 94 | Uruguay | 2 | 2 | 6 | 10 |
| 96 | Qatar | 2 | 2 | 5 | 9 |
| 97 | Fiji | 2 | 1 | 1 | 4 |
| 98 | Russian Empire* | 1 | 4 | 3 | 8 |
| 99 | Individual Neutral Athletes* | 1 | 4 | 1 | 6 |
| 100 | Peru | 1 | 3 | 1 | 5 |
| 100 | Vietnam | 1 | 3 | 1 | 5 |
| 102 | Luxembourg | 1 | 3 | 0 | 4 |
| 103 | Singapore | 1 | 2 | 3 | 6 |
| 104 | Botswana | 1 | 2 | 1 | 4 |
| 104 | Jordan | 1 | 2 | 1 | 4 |
| 106 | Tajikistan | 1 | 1 | 5 | 7 |
| 107 | Grenada | 1 | 1 | 3 | 5 |
| 107 | Ivory Coast | 1 | 1 | 3 | 5 |
| 109 | Costa Rica | 1 | 1 | 2 | 4 |
| 109 | Panama | 1 | 1 | 2 | 4 |
| 109 | Syria | 1 | 1 | 2 | 4 |
| 112 | Guatemala | 1 | 1 | 1 | 3 |
| 113 | Burundi | 1 | 1 | 0 | 2 |
| 113 | Saint Lucia | 1 | 1 | 0 | 2 |
| 115 | Bermuda | 1 | 0 | 1 | 2 |
| 115 | Independent Olympic Athletes* | 1 | 0 | 1 | 2 |
| 115 | Mozambique | 1 | 0 | 1 | 2 |
| 115 | Suriname | 1 | 0 | 1 | 2 |
| 115 | United Arab Emirates | 1 | 0 | 1 | 2 |
| 120 | Dominica | 1 | 0 | 0 | 1 |
| 121 | Malaysia | 0 | 8 | 7 | 15 |
| 122 | Kyrgyzstan | 0 | 5 | 8 | 13 |
| 123 | Namibia | 0 | 5 | 0 | 5 |
| 124 | Moldova | 0 | 3 | 7 | 10 |
| 125 | Iceland | 0 | 2 | 2 | 4 |
| 125 | Lebanon | 0 | 2 | 2 | 4 |
| 125 | Saudi Arabia | 0 | 2 | 2 | 4 |
| 128 | Cyprus | 0 | 2 | 0 | 2 |
| 128 | Sri Lanka | 0 | 2 | 0 | 2 |
| 128 | Tanzania | 0 | 2 | 0 | 2 |
| 131 | Ghana | 0 | 1 | 4 | 5 |
| 132 | Bohemia* | 0 | 1 | 3 | 4 |
| 133 | Independent Olympic Participants* | 0 | 1 | 2 | 3 |
| 133 | San Marino | 0 | 1 | 2 | 3 |
| 133 | Zambia | 0 | 1 | 2 | 3 |
| 136 | Haiti | 0 | 1 | 1 | 2 |
| 136 | Niger | 0 | 1 | 1 | 2 |
| 136 | North Macedonia | 0 | 1 | 1 | 2 |
| 139 | Gabon | 0 | 1 | 0 | 1 |
| 139 | Montenegro | 0 | 1 | 0 | 1 |
| 139 | Netherlands Antilles* | 0 | 1 | 0 | 1 |
| 139 | Paraguay | 0 | 1 | 0 | 1 |
| 139 | Samoa | 0 | 1 | 0 | 1 |
| 139 | Senegal | 0 | 1 | 0 | 1 |
| 139 | Sudan | 0 | 1 | 0 | 1 |
| 139 | Tonga | 0 | 1 | 0 | 1 |
| 139 | Turkmenistan | 0 | 1 | 0 | 1 |
| 139 | Virgin Islands | 0 | 1 | 0 | 1 |
| 149 | Kuwait | 0 | 0 | 3 | 3 |
| 150 | Afghanistan | 0 | 0 | 2 | 2 |
| 150 | Albania | 0 | 0 | 2 | 2 |
| 150 | British West Indies* | 0 | 0 | 2 | 2 |
| 153 | Barbados | 0 | 0 | 1 | 1 |
| 153 | Burkina Faso | 0 | 0 | 1 | 1 |
| 153 | Cape Verde | 0 | 0 | 1 | 1 |
| 153 | Djibouti | 0 | 0 | 1 | 1 |
| 153 | Eritrea | 0 | 0 | 1 | 1 |
| 153 | Guyana | 0 | 0 | 1 | 1 |
| 153 | Iraq | 0 | 0 | 1 | 1 |
| 153 | Mauritius | 0 | 0 | 1 | 1 |
| 153 | Refugee Olympic Team* | 0 | 0 | 1 | 1 |
| 153 | Togo | 0 | 0 | 1 | 1 |
| Totals (162 entries) | | 7,077 | 7,046 | 7,552 | 21,675 |

== Medal leaders by year ==
=== Summer ===
Summer Olympics medal table leaders by year
- 1896: United States
- 1900: France
- 1904: United States
- 1908: Great Britain
- 1912: United States
- 1920: United States
- 1924: United States
- 1928: United States
- 1932: United States
- 1936: Germany
- 1948: United States
- 1952: United States
- 1956: Soviet Union
- 1960: Soviet Union
- 1964: United States
- 1968: United States
- 1972: Soviet Union
- 1976: Soviet Union
- 1980: Soviet Union
- 1984: United States
- 1988: Soviet Union
- 1992: Unified Team
- 1996: United States
- 2000: United States
- 2004: United States
- 2008: China
- 2012: United States
- 2016: United States
- 2020: United States
- 2024: United States

Note

Only at four Summer Olympic Games did the leader in the medal standings not also win the most medals in total. In all these occasions, the second-place nation in the medal ranking won the most medals in total, and the first-place nation won the second-most:

- 1896: Greece (2nd place, 47 medals)
- 1912: Sweden (2nd place, 65 medals)
- 1964: Soviet Union (2nd place, 96 medals)
- 2008: United States (2nd place, 112 medals)

Number of occurrences

| Rank | Country | Number of games |
|---|---|---|
| 1 | United States | 19 times |
| 2 | Soviet Union | 6 times |
| 3 | China | 1 time |
| 3 | France | 1 time |
| 3 | Great Britain | 1 time |
| 3 | Germany | 1 time |
| 3 | Unified Team | 1 time |

=== Winter ===
Winter Olympics medal table leaders by year
- 1924: Norway
- 1928: Norway
- 1932: United States
- 1936: Norway
- 1948: Norway and Sweden
- 1952: Norway
- 1956: Soviet Union
- 1960: Soviet Union
- 1964: Soviet Union
- 1968: Norway
- 1972: Soviet Union
- 1976: Soviet Union
- 1980: Soviet Union
- 1984: East Germany
- 1988: Soviet Union
- 1992: Germany
- 1994: Russia
- 1998: Germany
- 2002: Norway
- 2006: Germany
- 2010: Canada
- 2014: Norway
- 2018: Norway
- 2022: Norway
- 2026: Norway

Note

Only at six Winter Olympic Games did the leader in the medal standings not also win the most medals in total. In five of these occasions, the second-place nation in the medal ranking won the most medals in total, while in one other occasion the third-place nation in the medal ranking won the most:

- 1980: East Germany (2nd place, 23 medals)
- 1984: Soviet Union (2nd place, 25 medals)
- 1994: Norway (2nd place, 26 medals)
- 2002: Germany (2nd place, 36 medals)
- 2010: United States (3rd place, 37 medals)
- 2014: Russia (2nd place, 29 medals)

Number of occurrences

| Rank | Country | Number of games |
|---|---|---|
| 1 | Norway | 11 times |
| 2 | Soviet Union | 7 times |
| 3 | Germany | 3 times |
| 4 | United States | 1 time |
| 4 | Sweden | 1 time |
| 4 | East Germany | 1 time |
| 4 | Canada | 1 time |
| 4 | Russia | 1 time |

=== Special case of Germany ===
If results for East and West Germany are combined, German athletes also won the most gold medals at the 1976 Summer Olympics and the 1988 Winter Olympics, in place of the Soviet Union.

== Variations ==
=== Early Olympics ===
For the 1900 and 1904 Summer Olympics, several countries attribute appearances and medals to athletes of their nationality that the IOC attributes to other countries. In 2024, the IOC reinstated its original and current attribution policy for athletes at the early Olympic Games (1896—1904). From 2021 to 2024, the IOC briefly attributed medals in individual events according to the athlete's nationality, even when the athlete represented a foreign club or team. Since 2024, participation and medals have instead been attributed according to the national affiliation of the club or team represented by the athlete.

Other differences from the official table are based on disagreements about which events were Olympic. This affects several of the events in the 1900 and 1904 Olympics. In addition, some sources include the 1906 Intercalated Games when compiling their medal tables.

=== Art competitions ===
- Art competitions (1912–1948)

Art competitions were held between the 1912 and 1948 Games, with medals awarded. The IOC classifies art competitions as non-sport competitions, separate from the Olympic sports programme. In 1952, art competition medals were removed from the official national medal counts. Only since 2021 have they been officially listed again by the IOC in the medal tables and respective National Olympic Committee (NOC) profiles on its website.

=== Alpinism and aeronautics ===
- Alpinism (1924 w, 1932, 1936)
- Aeronautics (1936)

From 1924 through 1936, the IOC on several occasions awarded gold medals for feats of alpinism and aeronautics that occurred in the preceding four-year Olympiad. Three gold medals in alpinism were awarded (for the 1922 British Mount Everest expedition, the first ascent of the northern wall of the Matterhorn in 1931, and for the Himalaya expeditions of 1930 and 1934 combined), respectively in the 1924 Winter, 1932 Summer, and 1936 Summer Games. In addition to the alpinism awards, in 1936, a gold medal was awarded in aeronautics to Hermann Schreiber of Switzerland for the first crossing of the Alps in a glider in 1935.

Some sources include these IOC awards of gold medals in the overall count. However, the IOC classifies these awards, like the medals awarded in artistic competitions, as separate from the official Olympic sports programme. The contemporary Olympia-Zeitung, the official journal from the 1936 Berlin Games, shows that these awards in 1936—final time such awards were offered—like art competition medals, were not included in the national medal count, unlike in the current IOC database for the medal tables of the Games in question.

=== Australasia ===
Australasia was a combined team of athletes from Australia and the Dominion of New Zealand that competed together at the 1908 and 1912 Summer Olympics. When the Olympic Games resumed in 1920 after World War I, the two nations sent separate teams to the Games, and have done so ever since.

| Date | Team | |
|---|---|---|
| 1896–1904 | Australia | |
| 1908–1912 | Australasia | |
| 1920– | Australia | New Zealand |

Medal counts:
status after the 2026 Winter Olympics

| | Summer Games | | | | | Winter Games | | | | | Combined total | | | | |
| Team (IOC code) | No. | Gold medal | Silver medal | Bronze medal | | No. | Gold medal | Silver medal | Bronze medal | | No. | Gold medal | Silver medal | Bronze medal | |
|---|---|---|---|---|---|---|---|---|---|---|---|---|---|---|---|
| Australasia | 2 | 3 | 4 | 5 | 12 | 0 | 0 | 0 | 0 | 0 | 2 | 3 | 4 | 5 | 12 |
| Australia | 28 | 180 | 189 | 225 | 594 | 21 | 9 | 9 | 7 | 25 | 49 | 189 | 198 | 232 | 619 |
| New Zealand | 25 | 63 | 40 | 54 | 157 | 18 | 2 | 4 | 3 | 9 | 42 | 65 | 44 | 57 | 166 |
| Total | 30 | 246 | 233 | 284 | 763 | 21 | 11 | 13 | 10 | 34 | 51 | 257 | 246 | 294 | 797 |

=== British West Indies ===
The West Indies Federation, also known as the West Indies, the Federation of the West Indies or the West Indian Federation, was a short-lived political union that existed from 3 January 1958 to 31 May 1962. Various islands in the Caribbean that were part of the British Empire, including Trinidad and Tobago, Barbados, Jamaica, and those on the Leeward and Windward Islands, came together to form the Federation.The expressed intention of the Federation was to create a political unit that would become independent from Britain as a single state Before that could happen, the Federation collapsed due to internal political conflicts over how it would be governed or function viably.

Athletes from the West Indies Federation competed under the name Antilles (ANT), renamed to British West Indies (BWI) by the IOC, at the 1960 Summer Olympics in Rome, Italy. Thirteen competitors—two from Barbados, four from Trinidad, and seven from Jamaica—all men, took part in thirteen events in five sports. The short-lived nation only participated at these single Games, as Jamaica and Trinidad and Tobago competed independently again in 1964, and Barbados started competing at the 1968 Games.

| Date | Team | | |
|---|---|---|---|
| 1948–1956 | Jamaica | Trinidad and Tobago | |
| 1960 | British West Indies | | |
| 1964 | Jamaica | Trinidad and Tobago | |
| 1968– | Jamaica | Trinidad and Tobago | Barbados |

Medal counts:
status after the 2026 Winter Olympics

| | Summer Games | | | | | Winter Games | | | | | Combined total | | | | |
| Team (IOC code) | No. | Gold medal | Silver medal | Bronze medal | | No. | Gold medal | Silver medal | Bronze medal | | No. | Gold medal | Silver medal | Bronze medal | |
|---|---|---|---|---|---|---|---|---|---|---|---|---|---|---|---|
| British West Indies | 1 | 0 | 0 | 2 | 2 | 0 | 0 | 0 | 0 | 0 | 1 | 0 | 0 | 2 | 2 |
| Jamaica | 19 | 27 | 39 | 28 | 94 | 10 | 0 | 0 | 0 | 0 | 29 | 27 | 39 | 28 | 94 |
| Trinidad and Tobago | 19 | 3 | 5 | 11 | 19 | 5 | 0 | 0 | 0 | 0 | 24 | 3 | 5 | 11 | 19 |
| Barbados | 14 | 0 | 0 | 1 | 1 | 0 | 0 | 0 | 0 | 0 | 14 | 0 | 0 | 1 | 1 |
| Total | 19 | 30 | 44 | 42 | 116 | 10 | 0 | 0 | 0 | 0 | 29 | 30 | 44 | 42 | 116 |

=== Czechoslovakia ===
Czechoslovakia first participated at the Olympic Games in 1920, after having competed as Bohemia from 1900 to 1912. The nation sent athletes to compete in every Summer Olympic Games since then, except for the 1984 Games when they were part of the Soviet-led boycott of the 1984 Summer Olympics. Czechoslovakia has participated in every Winter Olympic Games since the inaugural Games of 1924.

After the dissolution of Czechoslovakia in 1993, the Czech Republic and Slovakia sent independent teams to the Olympics starting in 1994.

| Date | Team | |
|---|---|---|
| 1896 | | as part of Hungary |
| 1900–1912 | as Bohemia | as part of Hungary |
| 1920–1992 | Czechoslovakia | |
| 1996– | Czech Republic | Slovakia |

Medal counts:
status after the 2026 Winter Olympics

| | Summer Games | | | | | Winter Games | | | | | Combined total | | | | |
| Team (IOC code) | No. | Gold medal | Silver medal | Bronze medal | | No. | Gold medal | Silver medal | Bronze medal | | No. | Gold medal | Silver medal | Bronze medal | |
|---|---|---|---|---|---|---|---|---|---|---|---|---|---|---|---|
| Bohemia | 3 | 0 | 1 | 3 | 4 | 0 | 0 | 0 | 0 | 0 | 3 | 0 | 1 | 3 | 4 |
| Czechoslovakia | 16 | 49 | 49 | 45 | 143 | 16 | 2 | 8 | 15 | 25 | 32 | 51 | 57 | 60 | 168 |
| Czech Republic | 8 | 22 | 22 | 28 | 72 | 9 | 12 | 13 | 14 | 39 | 17 | 34 | 35 | 42 | 111 |
| Slovakia | 8 | 10 | 14 | 9 | 33 | 9 | 4 | 5 | 1 | 10 | 17 | 14 | 19 | 10 | 43 |
| Total | 27 | 81 | 86 | 85 | 252 | 25 | 18 | 26 | 30 | 74 | 52 | 99 | 112 | 115 | 326 |

=== Germany ===
Germany has competed under five different designations, including as two separate teams at several Games. Sources vary in how they present the medals won by these teams. The table below shows sourced combinations of these teams, when applied to the updated medal totals from the main table. A part of Germany, Saar, competed independently in the Summer Olympic games in 1952, but failed to win any medals. Due to most lists only listing medal counts, it is possible Saar was included as part of Germany in their calculations. Germany was banned on three occasions (1920, 1924, and 1948).

| Date | Team | |
|---|---|---|
| 1896–1912 | (German Empire) Germany (GER) | |
| 1920–1924 | banned | |
| 1928–1936 | (Weimar Republic) (Nazi Germany) Germany (GER) | |
| 1948 | banned | |
| 1952 | Saar | Germany |
| 1956–1964 | United Team of Germany | |
| 1968–1988 | West Germany | East Germany |
| 1992– | Germany | |

Medal counts:
status after the 2026 Olympics

| | Summer Games | | | | | Winter Games | | | | | Combined total | | | | |
| Team (IOC code) | No. | Gold medal | Silver medal | Bronze medal | | No. | Gold medal | Silver medal | Bronze medal | | No. | Gold medal | Silver medal | Bronze medal | |
|---|---|---|---|---|---|---|---|---|---|---|---|---|---|---|---|
| Germany | 18 | 214 | 219 | 254 | 687 | 14 | 113 | 107 | 73 | 293 | 32 | 327 | 326 | 327 | 980 |
| Saar | 1 | 0 | 0 | 0 | 0 | 0 | 0 | 0 | 0 | 0 | 1 | 0 | 0 | 0 | 0 |
| United Team of Germany | 3 | 28 | 54 | 36 | 118 | 3 | 8 | 6 | 5 | 19 | 6 | 36 | 60 | 41 | 137 |
| West Germany | 5 | 56 | 67 | 81 | 204 | 6 | 11 | 15 | 13 | 39 | 11 | 67 | 82 | 94 | 243 |
| East Germany | 5 | 153 | 129 | 127 | 409 | 6 | 39 | 36 | 35 | 110 | 11 | 192 | 165 | 162 | 519 |
| Total | 28 | 451 | 469 | 498 | 1418 | 23 | 171 | 164 | 126 | 461 | 51 | 622 | 633 | 624 | 1879 |

=== Kuwait ===
At the 2016 Summer Olympics, nine athletes from Kuwait competed as Independent Olympic Athletes (IOA), as the Kuwait Olympic Committee had been suspended by the International Olympic Committee (IOC) for the second time in five years due to governmental interference. Although not allowed to compete as a sovereign state at the 2016 Summer Olympics, the nation's participants were able to compete as Independent Olympic Athletes under the Olympic flag. At those games, Kuwaiti shooters Fehaid Al-Deehani and Abdullah Al-Rashidi won a gold medal and bronze medal respectively as independent athletes.

| Date | Team |
|---|---|
| 1968–2012 | Kuwait |
| 2016 | Independent Olympic Athletes (2016) |
| 2020– | Kuwait |

Medal counts:
status after the 2026 Winter Olympics

| | Summer Games | | | | | Winter Games | | | | | Combined total | | | | |
| Team (IOC code) | No. | Gold medal | Silver medal | Bronze medal | | No. | Gold medal | Silver medal | Bronze medal | | No. | Gold medal | Silver medal | Bronze medal | |
|---|---|---|---|---|---|---|---|---|---|---|---|---|---|---|---|
| Kuwait | 14 | 0 | 0 | 3 | 3 | 0 | 0 | 0 | 0 | 0 | 14 | 0 | 0 | 3 | 3 |
| Independent Olympic Athletes (2016) | 1 | 1 | 0 | 1 | 2 | 0 | 0 | 0 | 0 | 0 | 1 | 1 | 0 | 1 | 2 |
| Total | 15 | 1 | 0 | 4 | 5 | 0 | 0 | 0 | 0 | 0 | 15 | 1 | 0 | 4 | 5 |

=== Netherlands Antilles ===
The Netherlands Antilles participated at the Olympic Games from 1952 until 2008 as a constituent country of the Kingdom of the Netherlands. The National Olympic Committee for the Netherlands Antilles was created in 1931 and recognized by the International Olympic Committee from 1950 until 2011 upon the dissolution of the Netherlands Antilles.

Aruba left the Netherlands Antilles in 1986 to become a constituent country within the Kingdom of the Netherlands. Between 1952 until 1984, Aruban athletes competed as part of the Netherlands Antilles. Since the Olympic Games in 1988, athletes from Aruba have competed separately under their own Olympic banner and have participated in each Summer Olympic Games since then.

After the dissolution of the Netherlands Antilles in 2010, Bonaire, Sint Eustatius and Saba became part of the Netherlands as special municipalities of the Netherlands. Curaçao and Sint Maarten became separate constituent countries of the Kingdom of the Netherlands. At the 2012 Summer Olympics, participants from the five islands competed as independent athletes under the Olympic flag. However, athletes from the former Netherlands Antilles who qualified for the 2012 Summer Olympics were allowed to participate independently under the Olympic flag. In addition since then, athletes from the territories that constituted the Netherlands Antilles have the possibility of competing for the Netherlands (as for example Churandy Martina did) or Aruba (as for example Philip Elhage did). Ultimately, three athletes from the Netherlands Antilles participated as Independent Olympic Athletes.

| Date | Team | | |
|---|---|---|---|
| 1900–1948 | Netherlands | | |
| 1952–1984 | Netherlands | Netherlands Antilles | |
| 1988–2008 | Netherlands | Netherlands Antilles | Aruba |
| 2012 | Netherlands | as part of Netherlands / Independent Olympic Athletes (2012) | Aruba |
| 2014– | Netherlands | | Aruba |

Medal counts:
status after the 2026 Winter Olympics

| | Summer Games | | | | | Winter Games | | | | | Combined total | | | | |
| Team (IOC code) | No. | Gold medal | Silver medal | Bronze medal | | No. | Gold medal | Silver medal | Bronze medal | | No. | Gold medal | Silver medal | Bronze medal | |
|---|---|---|---|---|---|---|---|---|---|---|---|---|---|---|---|
| Netherlands | 28 | 111 | 112 | 134 | 357 | 23 | 63 | 56 | 48 | 167 | 51 | 174 | 168 | 182 | 524 |
| Netherlands Antilles | 13 | 0 | 1 | 0 | 1 | 2 | 0 | 0 | 0 | 0 | 15 | 0 | 1 | 0 | 1 |
| Aruba | 10 | 0 | 0 | 0 | 0 | 0 | 0 | 0 | 0 | 0 | 10 | 0 | 0 | 0 | 0 |
| Independent Olympic Athletes (2012) | 1 | 0 | 0 | 0 | 0 | 0 | 0 | 0 | 0 | 0 | 1 | 0 | 0 | 0 | 0 |
| Total | 28 | 111 | 113 | 134 | 358 | 23 | 63 | 56 | 48 | 167 | 51 | 174 | 169 | 182 | 525 |

=== China ===
The Republic of China (ROC) participated in its first Summer Olympics in 1932 under the name of China. After the Chinese Civil War, the ROC retreated to the island of Taiwan in 1949, and only Taiwan-based athletes have competed on its behalf since then. In 1971, the ROC was expelled from the United Nations, but was permitted to compete under its official name, flag, and anthem in the 1972 Winter, 1972 Summer, and 1976 Winter Olympics. It was denied official representation in the 1976 Summer Olympics and boycotted it as a result. The 1979 Nagoya Resolution allowed the ROC to compete under the deliberately-ambiguous name "Chinese Taipei"; it protested against this decision and boycotted the 1980 Summer Olympics as well, but has competed under this name since the 1984 Winter Olympics.

The Republic of China took part in the Opening Ceremony of the 1924 Summer Olympics, but its four athletes, all of whom were tennis players, withdrew from competition.

Hong Kong first competed at the Olympic Games in 1952, then as a British colony (British Hong Kong). After the sovereignty of Hong Kong was transferred back to the People's Republic of China (PRC) in 1997, the NOC for the new special administrative region (SAR) of China has now been known as Hong Kong, China.

| Date | Team | | |
|---|---|---|---|
| 1924–1948 | Republic of China | | |
| 1952 | China | | Hong Kong (HKG) |
| 1956–1996 | China | Chinese Taipei | Hong Kong (HKG) |
| 2000– | China | Chinese Taipei | Hong Kong |

Medal counts:
status after the 2026 Winter Olympics

| | Summer Games | | | | | Winter Games | | | | | Combined total | | | | |
| Team (IOC code) | No. | Gold medal | Silver medal | Bronze medal | | No. | Gold medal | Silver medal | Bronze medal | | No. | Gold medal | Silver medal | Bronze medal | |
|---|---|---|---|---|---|---|---|---|---|---|---|---|---|---|---|
| Republic of China | 3 | 0 | 0 | 0 | 0 | 0 | 0 | 0 | 0 | 0 | 3 | 0 | 0 | 0 | 0 |
| China | 12 | 303 | 226 | 198 | 727 | 13 | 27 | 36 | 29 | 92 | 25 | 330 | 262 | 227 | 819 |
| Chinese Taipei | 16 | 9 | 11 | 23 | 43 | 14 | 0 | 0 | 0 | 0 | 30 | 9 | 11 | 23 | 43 |
| Hong Kong | 18 | 4 | 3 | 6 | 13 | 7 | 0 | 0 | 0 | 0 | 25 | 4 | 3 | 6 | 13 |
| Total | 20 | 316 | 240 | 227 | 783 | 15 | 27 | 36 | 29 | 92 | 35 | 343 | 276 | 256 | 875 |

=== Russian Federation and the Soviet Union ===
The Russian Federation, the Russian Empire, the Olympic Athletes from Russia and the Russian Olympic Committee (ROC) are sometimes combined outside of IOC sources. The Soviet Union is often combined with the post-union team that competed in 1992. Some sources combine the Soviet Union and Russia, despite the fact that many republics which subsequently gained or re-gained independence (Armenia, Azerbaijan, Belarus, Estonia, Georgia, Kazakhstan, Kyrgyzstan, Latvia, Lithuania, Moldova, Tajikistan, Turkmenistan, Ukraine and Uzbekistan) contributed to the medal tally of the USSR, and there are sources that combine all medals of RU1, URS, EUN, OAR, ROC and RUS. On 31 January 1992, the United Nations recognized, without objection, Russia as legal successor of the rights and obligations of the former Soviet Union, but this has no significance in medal tallies.

| Date | Team | | | | | | |
|---|---|---|---|---|---|---|---|
| 1900–1912 | Russian Empire | | | | | | |
| 1920 | Estonia | | | | | | |
| 1924–1936 | Estonia | Latvia | Lithuania | | | | |
| 1952–1988 | Soviet Union | | | | | | |
| 1992 | Estonia | Latvia | Lithuania | Unified Team | | | |
| 1994 | Estonia | Latvia | Lithuania | Russia | Belarus | Armenia, Georgia, Kazakhstan, Kyrgyzstan, Moldova, Ukraine, Uzbekistan | |
| 1996–2016 | Estonia | Latvia | Lithuania | Russia | Belarus | Armenia, Georgia, Kazakhstan, Kyrgyzstan, Moldova, Ukraine, Uzbekistan | Azerbaijan, Tajikistan, Turkmenistan |
| 2018 | Estonia | Latvia | Lithuania | Olympic Athletes from Russia | Belarus | Armenia, Georgia, Kazakhstan, Kyrgyzstan, Moldova, Ukraine, Uzbekistan | Azerbaijan, Tajikistan, Turkmenistan |
| 2020–2022 | Estonia | Latvia | Lithuania | Russian Olympic Committee (ROC) | Belarus | Armenia, Georgia, Kazakhstan, Kyrgyzstan, Moldova, Ukraine, Uzbekistan | Azerbaijan, Tajikistan, Turkmenistan |
| 2024–2026 | Estonia | Latvia | Lithuania | Individual Neutral Athletes | | Armenia, Georgia, Kazakhstan, Kyrgyzstan, Moldova, Ukraine, Uzbekistan | Azerbaijan, Tajikistan, Turkmenistan |

Medal counts:
Russia combined with precursors and Russian delegations
status after the 2026 Olympics

- Note: Neutral Russian athletes that competed as AIN at the 2024 Summer and the 2026 Winter Olympics are also included in the table.

| | Summer Games | | | | | Winter Games | | | | | Combined total | | | | |
| Team (IOC code) | No. | 1st place, gold medalist(s) | 2nd place, silver medalist(s) | 3rd place, bronze medalist(s) | Total | No. | 1st place, gold medalist(s) | 2nd place, silver medalist(s) | 3rd place, bronze medalist(s) | Total | No. | 1st place, gold medalist(s) | 2nd place, silver medalist(s) | 3rd place, bronze medalist(s) | Total |
|---|---|---|---|---|---|---|---|---|---|---|---|---|---|---|---|
| Russia | 6 | 147 | 124 | 150 | 421 | 6 | 45 | 39 | 34 | 118 | 12 | 192 | 163 | 184 | 539 |
| Russian Empire | 3 | 1 | 4 | 3 | 8 | 0 | 0 | 0 | 0 | 0 | 3 | 1 | 4 | 3 | 8 |
| Soviet Union | 9 | 395 | 319 | 296 | 1010 | 9 | 78 | 57 | 59 | 194 | 18 | 473 | 376 | 355 | 1204 |
| Unified Team | 1 | 45 | 38 | 29 | 112 | 1 | 9 | 6 | 8 | 23 | 2 | 54 | 44 | 37 | 135 |
| Olympic Athletes from Russia | 0 | 0 | 0 | 0 | 0 | 1 | 2 | 6 | 9 | 17 | 1 | 2 | 6 | 9 | 17 |
| ROC | 1 | 20 | 28 | 23 | 71 | 1 | 5 | 12 | 15 | 32 | 2 | 25 | 40 | 38 | 103 |
| Individual Neutral Athletes | 1 | 0 | 1 | 0 | 1 | 1 | 0 | 1 | 0 | 1 | 2 | 0 | 2 | 0 | 2 |
| Total | 21 | 608 | 514 | 501 | 1623 | 19 | 139 | 121 | 125 | 385 | 40 | 747 | 635 | 626 | 2008 |

Medal counts:
Post-Soviet states (except Russia)
status after the 2026 Winter Olympics

| | Summer Games | | | | | Winter Games | | | | | Combined total | | | | |
| Team (IOC code) | No. | Gold medal | Silver medal | Bronze medal | | No. | Gold medal | Silver medal | Bronze medal | | No. | Gold medal | Silver medal | Bronze medal | |
|---|---|---|---|---|---|---|---|---|---|---|---|---|---|---|---|
| Estonia | 14 | 10 | 9 | 17 | 36 | 12 | 4 | 3 | 2 | 9 | 26 | 14 | 12 | 19 | 45 |
| Latvia | 13 | 4 | 11 | 6 | 21 | 13 | 1 | 4 | 7 | 12 | 26 | 5 | 15 | 13 | 33 |
| Lithuania | 11 | 6 | 9 | 15 | 30 | 11 | 0 | 0 | 0 | 0 | 22 | 6 | 9 | 15 | 30 |
| Armenia | 8 | 2 | 11 | 9 | 22 | 9 | 0 | 0 | 0 | 0 | 17 | 2 | 11 | 9 | 22 |
| Belarus | 7 | 13 | 30 | 42 | 85 | 8 | 8 | 7 | 5 | 20 | 15 | 21 | 37 | 47 | 105 |
| Georgia | 8 | 13 | 15 | 19 | 47 | 9 | 0 | 1 | 0 | 1 | 17 | 13 | 16 | 19 | 48 |
| Kazakhstan | 8 | 15 | 25 | 38 | 78 | 9 | 2 | 3 | 4 | 9 | 17 | 17 | 28 | 42 | 87 |
| Kyrgyzstan | 8 | 0 | 5 | 8 | 13 | 9 | 0 | 0 | 0 | 0 | 17 | 0 | 5 | 8 | 13 |
| Moldova | 8 | 0 | 3 | 7 | 10 | 9 | 0 | 0 | 0 | 0 | 17 | 0 | 3 | 7 | 10 |
| Ukraine | 8 | 38 | 41 | 72 | 151 | 9 | 3 | 2 | 4 | 9 | 17 | 41 | 43 | 76 | 160 |
| Uzbekistan | 8 | 18 | 8 | 23 | 49 | 9 | 1 | 0 | 0 | 1 | 17 | 19 | 8 | 23 | 50 |
| Azerbaijan | 8 | 9 | 16 | 31 | 56 | 8 | 0 | 0 | 0 | 0 | 16 | 9 | 16 | 31 | 56 |
| Tajikistan | 8 | 1 | 1 | 5 | 7 | 4 | 0 | 0 | 0 | 0 | 12 | 1 | 1 | 5 | 7 |
| Turkmenistan | 8 | 0 | 1 | 0 | 1 | 0 | 0 | 0 | 0 | 0 | 8 | 0 | 1 | 0 | 1 |
| Total | 14 | 129 | 185 | 292 | 606 | 13 | 19 | 20 | 22 | 61 | 27 | 148 | 205 | 314 | 667 |

=== Yugoslavia ===
Teams from Yugoslavia first participated at the Olympic Games in 1920. Yugoslavia has been the designation for Olympic teams from three distinct national entities:

- Kingdom of Yugoslavia (officially called the Kingdom of Serbs, Croats and Slovenes until 1929) from 1920 to 1936
- Socialist Federal Republic of Yugoslavia from 1948 to the 1992 Winter Olympics
- Federal Republic of Yugoslavia, formed as a joint state by only Montenegro and Serbia after the breakup of Yugoslavia, from 1996 to 2002

The United Nations affirmed that the Socialist Federal Republic of Yugoslavia had ceased to exist, and the Federal Republic of Yugoslavia (FRY) was a new state. All former republics were entitled to state succession, while none of them continued SFR Yugoslavia's international legal personality. As a result of the U.N. resolution, individual FRY athletes were allowed to compete as Independent Olympic Participants at the 1992 Summer Olympics, and FRY was not allowed to compete at the 1994 Winter Olympics.

The Federal Republic of Yugoslavia, consisting of the Republic of Serbia and the Republic of Montenegro, participated at the Games since 1996. At the 1996 and 2000 Games, the nation was designated with the same code, Yugoslavia (YUG), as the defunct SFRY. It was rechartered as the State Union of Serbia and Montenegro in 2003 with there being no territorial changes. The Serbia and Montenegro (SCG) designation and code were used at the 2004 Games.

Two of the successor nations (Croatia and Slovenia) began to compete as independent teams at the Olympics starting at the 1992 Winter Games and Bosnia and Herzegovina at the 1992 Summer Games and as of the 2008 Summer Olympics, all six successor nations, former socialist republics, have participated independently. Kosovo, a former autonomous province, made its Olympic debut as an independent national team at the 2016 Summer Olympics.

| Date | Team | | | | | | |
|---|---|---|---|---|---|---|---|
| 1912 | as part of Austria | | | | Serbia | | |
| 1920–1936 | Kingdom of Yugoslavia (YUG) | | | | | | |
| 1948–1988 | (Socialist Federal Republic of Yugoslavia) SFR Yugoslavia (YUG) | | | | | | |
| 1992 W | Croatia | Slovenia | (Socialist Federal Republic of Yugoslavia) SFR Yugoslavia (YUG) | | | | |
| 1992 S | Croatia | Slovenia | Bosnia and Herzegovina | Independent Olympic Participants | | | |
| 1994 | Croatia | Slovenia | Bosnia and Herzegovina | ban on participation by the UN | | | |
| 1996–2006 | Croatia | Slovenia | Bosnia and Herzegovina | North Macedonia | (Federal Republic of Yugoslavia) FR Yugoslavia (YUG)/ Serbia and Montenegro | | |
| 2008–2014 | Croatia | Slovenia | Bosnia and Herzegovina | North Macedonia | Serbia | | Montenegro |
| 2016– | Croatia | Slovenia | Bosnia and Herzegovina | North Macedonia | Serbia | Kosovo | Montenegro |

Medal counts:
status after the 2026 Winter Olympics

| | Summer Games | | | | | Winter Games | | | | | Combined total | | | | |
| Team (IOC code) | No. | Gold medal | Silver medal | Bronze medal | | No. | Gold medal | Silver medal | Bronze medal | | No. | Gold medal | Silver medal | Bronze medal | |
|---|---|---|---|---|---|---|---|---|---|---|---|---|---|---|---|
| Serbia (1912, 2008–current) | 6 | 9 | 8 | 11 | 28 | 5 | 0 | 0 | 0 | 0 | 11 | 9 | 8 | 11 | 28 |
| Yugoslavia (1920–1992 w) | 16 | 26 | 29 | 28 | 83 | 14 | 0 | 3 | 1 | 4 | 30 | 26 | 32 | 29 | 87 |
| Independent Olympic Participants (1992 s) | 1 | 0 | 1 | 2 | 3 | 0 | 0 | 0 | 0 | 0 | 1 | 0 | 1 | 2 | 3 |
| Serbia and Montenegro (1996–2006) | 3 | 2 | 4 | 3 | 9 | 3 | 0 | 0 | 0 | 0 | 6 | 2 | 4 | 3 | 9 |
| Croatia (1992–current) | 9 | 16 | 15 | 17 | 48 | 10 | 4 | 6 | 1 | 11 | 19 | 20 | 21 | 18 | 59 |
| Slovenia (1992–current) | 9 | 10 | 10 | 11 | 31 | 10 | 6 | 9 | 13 | 28 | 19 | 16 | 19 | 24 | 59 |
| Bosnia and Herzegovina (1992 s –current) | 9 | 0 | 0 | 0 | 0 | 9 | 0 | 0 | 0 | 0 | 18 | 0 | 0 | 0 | 0 |
| North Macedonia (1996–current) | 8 | 0 | 1 | 1 | 2 | 8 | 0 | 0 | 0 | 0 | 16 | 0 | 1 | 1 | 2 |
| Montenegro (2008–current) | 5 | 0 | 1 | 0 | 1 | 5 | 0 | 0 | 0 | 0 | 10 | 0 | 1 | 0 | 1 |
| Kosovo (2016–current) | 3 | 3 | 1 | 1 | 5 | 3 | 0 | 0 | 0 | 0 | 6 | 3 | 1 | 1 | 5 |
| Total | 26 | 66 | 70 | 74 | 210 | 23 | 10 | 18 | 15 | 43 | 49 | 76 | 88 | 89 | 253 |

=== Others ===
In addition to the teams of Independent Olympians at the Olympic Games mentioned above—Kuwait, Russia, the former Netherlands Antilles, and the former Yugoslavia—several other NOCs were represented by independent Olympic athletes. East Timor's team in 2000 consisted of four athletes competing as Individual Olympic Athletes. In 2012, one independent Olympic athlete represented South Sudan. In the 2014 Winter Olympics, the team from India included one independent Olympic participant.

== Notes ==
=== Obsolete nations notes ===
- ^{ANZ} → ^{AUS} , ^{NZL} Australasia (ANZ) was a combined team of athletes from Australia (AUS) and New Zealand (NZL). They competed together during the 1908 and 1912 Games.
- ^{BOH} → ^{TCH} → ^{CZE} , ^{SVK} Prior to the foundation of Czechoslovakia (TCH) after World War I, athletes from Bohemia (BOH) (now part of the present-day Czech Republic) competed in 1900, 1908, and 1912 Games. Czechoslovakia competed in 1920–1992, from 1994 represented by successor NOCs of Czech Republic (CZE) and Slovakia (SVK).
- ^{BWI} → ^{BAR} , ^{JAM} , ^{TTO} Athletes from Barbados (BAR), Jamaica (JAM), and Trinidad and Tobago (TRI) competed as the British West Indies (BWI) at the 1960 Games. The West Indies Federation only existed as a nation from 1958 to 1962, so the constituent nations once again competed independently in 1964.
- ^{SAA} , ^{EUA} , ^{GDR} , ^{FRG} → ^{GER} Germany (GER) competed 1896–1952 and from 1992. Due to the partition of Germany after World War II, Germany was represented by two teams at the 1952 Games — Germany (GER) and the Saar (SAA). The Saar was reintegrated back into the Federal Republic of Germany on 1 January 1957, and Saar athletes then competed for Germany. East Germany did not contribute athletes to the 1952 team, as the National Olympic Committee for the German Democratic Republic was only granted "provisional" recognition by the IOC in 1955. For the Games of 1956–1964, Germany participated as a United Team of Germany (EUA), representing the National Olympic Committees of both West Germany and East Germany. Retrospectively, the IOC uses the country code EUA for this team. After the NOC for the German Democratic Republic was granted full recognition by the IOC in 1968, East Germany (GDR) and West Germany (FRG) competed as two independent teams from the 1968 to the 1988 Games.
- ^{MAL} , ^{NBO} → ^{MAS} Athletes from Malaya (MAL) and North Borneo (NBO) competed as independent teams at the 1956 Games and Malaya also competed at the 1960 Games, prior to the formation of the Federation of Malaysia (MAS) in 1963.
- ^{AHO} The Netherlands Antilles (AHO), an autonomous country within the Netherlands (NED), competed 1952–2008. The Netherlands Antilles Olympic Committee's membership in the IOC was withdrawn in 2011 because of the dissolution of the Netherlands Antilles.
- ^{RU1} → ^{URS} → ^{EUN} → ^{RUS} The Russian Empire (RU1) participated at the 1900, 1908 and 1912 Games prior to World War I. The Soviet Union (URS) competed from 1952 to 1988. The Unified Team (EUN) is the generic name used for a combined team of six post-Soviet republics that competed at the 1992 Winter Olympics and a combined team of twelve post-Soviet republics that competed at the 1992 Summer Olympics. The Russian Federation (RUS) and the other fourteen post-Soviet republics started competing independently in 1992 (Latvia, Lithuania, Estonia), 1994 or 1996.
- ^{SRB} , ^{YUG to 1992} , ^{YUG/SCG} Serbia (SRB, 1912, 2006–current) first participated at the Olympic Games in 1912. Yugoslavia (YUG, 1920–1992 Winter) competed as Kingdom of Yugoslavia (officially the Kingdom of Serbs, Croats and Slovenes until 1929) in five Games (1920–1936) before the Second World War. They later competed as Socialist Federal Republic of Yugoslavia for the Games (1948–1992 Winter). This ended with the breakup of Yugoslavia. Some ex-Yugoslavian nations (Croatia, Slovenia, Bosnia and Herzegovina) have competed as independent teams since 1992. Individual athletes from the Federal Republic of Yugoslavia (Serbia and Montenegro) competed as Independent Olympic Participants (IOP) at the 1992 Summer Games because of sanctions placed by the United Nations. Athletes representing Macedonia likewise competed as Independent Olympic Participants that year because their NOC had not yet been formed, but since 1996 Macedonia has competed as an independent team. The team of the State Union of Serbia and Montenegro (SCG, 2004–2006) consisted of Serbia and Montenegro, until 2006 when Montenegro seceded from the Union. This team competed as Yugoslavia (YUG) from 1996 to 2002 and then changed to Serbia and Montenegro (2004–2006). After 96 years Serbia returned to the Olympics as an independent team at the 2008 Games. Montenegro first participated as an independent team in 2008.
- ^{YAR} , ^{YMD} → ^{YEM} Prior to Yemeni unification in 1990, North Yemen participated as the Yemen Arab Republic (YAR) in 1984 and 1988, and South Yemen participated as the Yemen Democratic Republic (YMD) at the 1988 Games. After forming united republic Yemen (YEM) has participated since 1992.
- ^{ROC} → ^{CHN} , ^{TPE} The Republic of China was designated as China at the 1932, 1936, and 1948 Games and represented China. After the Chinese Civil War, the People's Republic of China (CHN) and Chinese Taipei (TPE) have participated as separate teams.
- ^{ZZX} Special code used by the IOC to refer to medals won by athletes of multiple nations competing together, which was common in early Games (1896–1904). These medals are not included in the respective totals for each nation represented by individual mixed team athletes.
- ^{IOP} , ^{IOA} , ^{OAR} , ^{ROC} , ^{AIN} Special codes used by the IOC for athletes whose NOC is not recognized by IOC. At the 1992 Summer Olympics, fifty eight athletes from former Yugoslavia competed as Independent Olympic Participants (IOP). At the 2000 Summer Olympics, four athletes from East Timor competed as Individual Olympic Athletes (IOA). At the 2012 Summer Olympics, three athletes from former Netherlands Antilles and one athlete from South Sudan competed as Independent Olympic Athletes (IOA). At the 2014 Winter Olympics, three athletes from India competed as Independent Olympic Participants (IOP). At the 2016 Summer Olympics, nine athletes from Kuwait competed as Independent Olympic Athletes (IOA). At the 2018 Winter Olympics, 168 athletes from Russia competed as Olympics Athletes from Russia (OAR). At the 2020 Summer Olympics and the 2022 Winter Olympics, athletes from Russia competed as the Russian Olympic Committee (ROC). At the 2024 Summer Olympics and the 2026 Winter Olympics, athletes from Russia and Belarus competed as Individual Neutral Athletes (AIN).

=== Name changes notes ===
- ^{BIZ} Belize participated under its former name of British Honduras (HBR) in 1968 and 1972.
- ^{BEN} Benin was known as Dahomey (DAH) in 1972.
- ^{BUR} Burkina Faso was known as Upper Volta (VOL) in 1972.
- ^{TPE2} After the Chinese Civil War, Chinese Taipei (TPE) participated using the name of the Republic of China at the 1956, 1960, 1972 and 1976 (winter) Games and using Taiwan designation at the 1964 and 1968 Games. In 1979, the IOC started to use Chinese Taipei to refer to the NOC, a compromise that was acceptable for the People's Republic of China (CHN) that led to the start of its participation in the Olympic Games. The name Chinese Taipei was first used in 1984. Participation of the Republic of China, representing China, in 1932, 1936 and 1948 Games are not counted in Taiwan's total participation count.
- ^{COD} The Democratic Republic of the Congo was known as Zaire (ZAI) between 1984 and 1996.
- ^{CIV} Côte d'Ivoire was known as Ivory Coast between 1964 and 1988.
- ^{EGY} Egypt participated as the United Arab Republic (UAR) between 1960 and 1968.
- ^{GBR} Includes medals won by athletes from the United Kingdom of Great Britain and Ireland (1896–1920) and the United Kingdom of Great Britain and Northern Ireland (1924–present), both of which used the name "Great Britain" and the country code GBR. Athletes from Northern Ireland can choose whether to compete for Great Britain or Ireland.
- ^{GHA} Prior to Ghana's independence in 1957, Gold Coast participated in the 1952 Games.
- ^{GUY} Prior to Guyana's independence in 1966, British Guiana participated from 1948 to 1964.
- ^{HKG} Totals of Hong Kong (HKG) includes all medals won by athletes representing the Sports Federation and Olympic Committee of Hong Kong, designated as "Hong Kong" from 1952 to 1996, and the Sports Federation and Olympic Committee of Hong Kong, China, desingated as "Hong Kong, China" since 2000.
- ^{MKD} North Macedonia was known as Macedonia, or more formally the Former Yugoslav Republic of Macedonia due to a naming dispute with Greece, between 1996 and 2018.
- ^{MYA} Myanmar was known as Burma (BIR) between 1948 and 1988.
- ^{SAM} Samoa was known as Western Samoa between 1984 and 1996.
- ^{SRI} Sri Lanka was known as Ceylon (CEY) between 1948 and 1972.
- ^{SWZ} Eswatini was known as Swaziland between 1972 and 2016.
- ^{TAN} Although Tanganyika and Zanzibar had already merged to form Tanzania in April 1964, the nation was designated Tanganyika in the official report of the 1964 Games.
- ^{ZAM} Zambia achieved independence on the last day of the 1964 Games, but had participated as Northern Rhodesia (NRH) during those Games.
- ^{ZIM} Prior to Zimbabwe's independence in 1980, Southern Rhodesia participated as Rhodesia (RHO) in 1928, 1960, and 1964 Games.

=== Participation notes ===
- ^{A} Brunei's participation in the 1988 Games consisted only of a single official, but no competing athletes. This participation is not counted in Brunei's participation total.
- ^{B} Djibouti at the 2004 Games took part in the Opening Ceremony, but neither athlete competed, so this participation is not counted in Djibouti's participation total.
- ^{C} Liberia's athletes withdrew from 1980 Games after marching in the Opening Ceremony and took part in the boycott. This participation is not counted in Liberia's participation total.
- ^{D} Libya marched in the opening ceremony of the 1964 Games, but then withdrew from competition. This participation is not counted in Libya's participation total.
- ^{E} Suriname at the 1960 Games took part in the Opening Ceremony, but its lone athlete withdrew from Games due to a scheduling error. Participation of Suriname at the 1960 Games not recognized by IOC, so this participation is not counted in Suriname's participation total.
- ^{F} India's athletes originally competed at the 2014 Games as Independent Olympic Participants and marched under the Olympic Flag during the opening ceremony due to the Indian Olympic Association's suspension. On February 11, 2014, the Indian Olympic Association was reinstated and India's athletes were allowed the option to compete under their own flag from that time onward.
- ^{Ia} ^{Ib} Does not include the participation of East Timor's and Netherlands Antilles's athletes as Individual Olympic Athletes (IOA) at the 2000 Summer Olympics and the 2012 Summer Olympics.
- ^{Za} ^{Zb} ^{Zc} ^{Zd} ^{Ze} ^{Zf} ^{Zg} ^{Zh} ^{Zi} ^{Zj} ^{Zk} ^{Zl} ^{Zm} Does not include medals won as part of mixed teams with athletes from other nations (1896–1904).

=== Disputed participation notes ===
- ^{H} The Bulgarian Olympic Committee claims that Charles Champaud, a Swiss gymnastics teacher living in Sofia, competed for the nation in 1896. Bulgarian participation at the 1896 Games is recognized by the IOC.
- ^{I} The Chilean Olympic Committee claims that Luis Subercaseaux Errázuriz, a Chilean diplomat and athlete, competed for the nation in 1896. Chilean participation at the 1896 Games is recognized by the IOC.
- ^{J} Some sources consider Léon Thiércelin, a fencer who competed at the 1900 Games, of Haitian nationality and therefore the first Olympic appearance by Haiti. Participation of Haiti at the 1900 Games is not recognized by the IOC, so this participation is not counted in Haiti's participation total.
- ^{K} Some sources consider Freydoun Malkom, a fencer who competed at the 1900 Games, of Persian nationality and therefore the first Olympic appearance by Iran. Participation of Iran at the 1900 Games is not recognized by the IOC, so this participation is not counted in Iran's participation total.
- ^{L} Some sources consider Carlos de Candamo, a fencer who competed at the 1900 Games, of Peruvian nationality and therefore the first Olympic appearance by Peru. Participation of Peru at the 1900 Games is not recognized by the IOC, so this participation is not counted in Peru's participation total.
- ^{M} Enrico Brusoni's gold medal in the Cycling Men's Points Race at the 1900 Summer Olympics is recognized by the Italian National Olympic Committee as well as the IOC as being won in a 1900 Summer Olympics event, although some sources state it was unofficial.
- ^{N} Monaco earned a bronze in the art competitions at the 1924 Summer Olympics. However, medals in art competitions are no longer recognized by the IOC.
- ^{Oa} ^{Ob} Michel Théato, a French athlete who won the gold medal in marathon at the 1900 Games, was born in Luxembourg. The IOC does not recognize Luxembourg participation at the 1900 Games and attributes his medal to France.

The nationalities of many medalists at the 1904 Olympics are disputed as many competitors were recent immigrants to the United States who had not yet been granted US citizenship.

- ^{Pa} ^{Pb} Sources are inconsistent regarding Albert Corey's participation in 1904, who immigrated to the United States from France. The Games report refers to Corey as a "Frenchman wearing the colors of the Chicago Athletic Association", but the IOC retroactively attributes his medal in the marathon to the United States, and in contradiction, the medal in the four mile team race (that was won by a team of three Americans and Corey) to a mixed team composed of athletes from multiple nations instead of just the United States.
- ^{Qa} ^{Qb} The International Olympic Committee considers Norwegian-American wrestlers Charles Ericksen and Bernhoff Hansen who immigrated from Norway to the United States to have competed for the United States. Each man won a gold medal. In 2012, Norwegian historians however found documentation showing that Ericksen did not receive American citizenship until March 22, 1905, and that Hansen, who was registered as an "alien" (foreigner) as late as 1925, probably never received American citizenship. The historians have therefore petitioned the IOC to have the athletes registered as Norwegians. In May 2013, it was reported that the Norwegian Olympic Committee had filed a formal application for changing the nationality of the wrestlers in the IOC's medal database.
- ^{R} Bob Fowler, an American marathon runner who competed at the 1904 Games, was a native Newfoundlander, Newfoundland is occasionally listed as a separate country at the 1904 Olympics, and would be listed as an historical NOC without medals. Participation of Newfoundland at the 1904 Games is not recognized by the IOC.
- ^{S} In 2009, historians from the International Society of Olympic Historians discovered that cyclist Frank Bizzoni was an Italian citizen when he competed in 1904 being granted US citizenship in 1917. However, the IOC does not officially recognize Italy's participation in the 1904 Olympics.
- ^{Fm} The IOC counts one gold, one silver, and two bronze medals won by American fencer Albertson Van Zo Post for Cuba instead of the United States. The one silver and one bronze medal won by American Charles Tatham are also counted for Cuba instead of the United States.

== See also ==
- All-time Paralympic Games medal table
- All-time Youth Olympic Games medal table
- Olympic medal table
- List of first Olympic gold medalists by country
- List of first Olympic medalists by National Olympic Committee
- List of participating nations at the Summer Olympic Games
- List of participating nations at the Winter Olympic Games
- List of multiple Olympic gold medalists
- List of multiple Olympic gold medalists at a single Games
- List of multiple Olympic gold medalists in one event
- List of multiple Olympic medalists
- List of multiple Olympic medalists at a single Games
- List of multiple Olympic medalists in one event
- List of Olympic teams by medals won
