= Olympic medal table =

Method of sorting Olympic medals

The Olympic medal table is a method of sorting the medal placements of countries in the modern-day Olympics and Paralympics. The International Olympic Committee (IOC) does not officially recognize a ranking of participating countries at the Olympic Games. Nevertheless, the IOC does publish medal tallies for information purposes, showing the total number of Olympic medals earned by athletes representing each country's respective National Olympic Committee. The convention used by the IOC is to sort by the number of gold medals the athletes from a country have earned. In the event of a tie in the number of gold medals, the number of silver medals is taken into consideration, and then the number of bronze medals. If two countries have an equal number of gold, silver, and bronze medals, they are ordered in the table alphabetically by their IOC country code.

== Background ==
The Olympic Charter, Chapter 1, section 6 states that:

The Olympic Games are competitions between athletes in individual or team events and not between countries...

The Charter goes even further in Chapter 5, section 57, expressly prohibiting the IOC from producing an official ranking:

The IOC and the OCOG shall not draw up any global ranking per country. A roll of honour bearing the names of medal winners and those awarded diplomas in each event shall be established by the OCOG and the names of the medal winners shall be featured prominently and be on permanent display in the main stadium.

According to Australian IOC member Kevan Gosper, the IOC began to accommodate medals tables in 1992, releasing 'information' based on the 'gold first' standard. The medal tables provided on its website carry this disclaimer:

The International Olympic Committee (IOC) does not recognise global ranking per country; the medal tables are displayed for information only. Furthermore, the results that we publish are official and are taken from the "Official Report" - a document published for each Olympic Games by the Organising Committee. However, for the first Olympic Games (until Antwerp in 1920), it is difficult to give the exact number of medals awarded to some countries since teams were composed of athletes from different countries. The medal tables by country are based on the number of medals won, with gold medals taking priority over silver and bronze. A team victory counts as one medal.

=== Official reports ===
Each Olympic Games organising committee (except in 1904) has published an official report after the conclusion of the Games, which among other things list the results of each event. Some early reports included an overall national ranking, including those of 1908, 1912, 1924 (Summer and Winter) and 1928 (Winter). The 1912 and 1924 tables are described as "official" while that of 1928 is "unofficial".

The 1932 Winter Games report states, "There is no official point score in the Olympic Games" and quotes General Rule 19 of the 1930 Olympic Charter, "In the Olympic Games there is no classification according to points". It states that the country-based organisation of teams is "chiefly for practical convenience" and that country rankings are "a grave injustice on the smaller countries". It continues that "it has been the experience of all previous Olympic Games that the press of the world insist on exploiting the aspect of national rivalry by creating and publishing a wholly unofficial point score of their own devising, most often on the basis of 10, 5, 4, 3, 2, 1 points for the six places recognized on the table of honour". The report itself provides such a table "for ready reference".

=== National goals ===
The sports funding agencies of some nations have set targets of reaching a certain rank in the medals table, usually based on gold medals; examples are Australia, Japan, France, and Germany. Funding is reduced for sports with low prospects of medals.

After London's successful bid to host the 2012 Olympics, UK Sport submitted a funding request to the Department for Culture, Media and Sport setting an "aspirational goal" of fourth place in the 2012 medals table, to be reviewed after the 2008 Olympics, for which a target of eighth place was set. The British Olympic Association dissociated itself from setting targets. When Britain finished fourth in 2008, the 2012 target was settled at fourth, with the team ultimately finishing third.

Australia's disappointing 10th-place in the 2012 medals table prompted the Australian Sports Commission to draw up a ten-year plan which included a "medium-term" goal of a top-five place in the Summer Olympics and Paralympics and a top-15 place in the winter games.

When Tokyo bid for the 2016 Summer Olympics, the Japanese Olympic Committee set a 2016 target of third place in gold medals, which it retained even after the games were awarded in 2009 to Rio de Janeiro.

== Ranking systems ==
"I believe each country will highlight what suits it best. One country will say, 'Gold medals.' The other country will say, 'The total tally counts.' We take no position on that."

— IOC President Jacques Rogge

As the IOC does not consider its sorting of nations to be an official ranking system, various methods of ranking nations are used. Some sort rankings decided by the total number of medals the country has but most list by the gold medals counted. However, if two or more teams have the same number of gold medals, the silver medals are then judged from the most to the least and then the bronze medals.

=== Medal count ranking ===
The gold first ranking system described above is used by most of the world media, as well as the IOC. While the gold first ranking system has been used occasionally by some American media outlets, newspapers in the United States primarily publish medal tables ordered by the total number of medals won.

This difference in rankings has its origins in the early days of the Olympics, when the IOC did not publish or recognise medal tables. Before the 2002 Winter Olympics the difference in ranking system received scant notice, since in recent Olympic history the country that led in total medals also led in the gold count. However, during the 2002 Winter Olympics Germany won the highest number of medals (36), but earned one gold medal fewer than Norway - the latter winning 13. A similar situation occurred at the 2008 Summer Olympics, where China led the gold medal count while the United States topped the medal table in total medals. The trend appeared again at the 2010 Winter Olympics, with Canada ranking 1st in gold medals and 3rd in total medals, while the United States placed 3rd in golds but 1st overall. Likewise, at the 2014 Winter Olympics, Norway finished 1st in gold medals and 3rd in total medals, whereas Russia placed second in golds yet led the overall medal count.

Other exceptions are the 1896, 1912, and 1964 Summer Olympics, when the United States finished first in gold medal count, but second in the overall medal count, and 1980, 1984, and 1994 Winter Olympics, when East Germany, Soviet Union and Norway winning respectively the total medal ranking as second-placed in the gold medal ranking. In an 24 August 2008 news conference, IOC President Jacques Rogge confirmed that the IOC does not have a view on any particular ranking system.

Finally, an inherent bias has been observed in these medal rankings against team sports. While in individual sports there are multiple chances for a single athlete to win a medal, in team sports a group of athletes can only win one medal for their country. If the men's and women's swimming events are combined, there are ninety possible medals that can be achieved by success in the sport. Basketball or football, on the contrary, have just two possible gold medals each. This circumstance is detrimental to countries with a strong tradition in team sports, and has led some to propose a system where all the individual medals given out to team members are counted. It has also been noted that, with medals standing as an indicator of Olympic success, the current system acts as an incentive for countries to increase funding and support to individual sports.

=== Population-size, resources-per-person and multivariate prediction models and ratings ===
Sporting success predictions and ratings can be univariate, i.e. based on one independent variable, such as a country's population size and the number of medals is divided by the population of the country, or multivariate, where resources-per-person in the form of GDP per capita and other variables are included.

Resources per person in the form of GDP per capita has been included in an article by The Guardian published during the 2012 Summer Olympics and again by Google's News Lab for the Rio 2016 games. Already in 2002, the research done by Meghan Busse of Northwestern University suggested that both a large population and high per capita GDP are needed to generate high medal totals, and predictive models have been built trying to predict success with multivariate analysis, taking also past results and host-nation advantage into account.

=== Weighted ranking ===
Systematic rankings based upon a weighted point system with the most points awarded to a gold medal have also been devised. Those used in the official reports were:

- 1908: 5:3:1 — gold medals five points, silver medals three points, and bronze medals 1 point.
- 1912: 3:2:1 — the report also compares this "Swedish" method with the 5:3:1 "English" method.
- 1924: 10:5:4:3:2:1 — so points were awarded for 4th to 6th places, where no medals were awarded. The IOC did require top six finishers to be listed in the report in a "table of honour".
- 1928: 6:5:4:3:2:1 — separate totals are listed depending on whether the military patrol was included or not, as its status was downgraded belatedly to demonstration sport.
- 1932: same as 1924, and described as the usual scheme in newspapers.

The 1908 and 1924 systems share the points for tied placings: for example, in a two-way tie for second, each gets half the sum of the points for second and third place.

In 2004, a 3:2:1 system was used by the Australian Geography Teachers Association. This weighting values a gold medal as much weight as a silver and a bronze medal combined. In response to the 2008 controversy over medal rank, Jeff Z. Klein in a New York Times blog post proposed a 4:2:1 system as a compromise between the total-medals and golds-first methods. These systems have been popular in certain places at certain times, but none of them have been adopted on a large scale.

== See also ==
- All-time Olympic Games medal table
- All-time Paralympic Games medal table
- All-time Youth Olympic Games medal table
- List of Olympic medal leaders by year
