= List of Olympic medal leaders by year =

The following statistics show the winning nations at the Summer and Winter Olympic Games. Depending on the counting method for the Olympic medal table, these are the nations that won the most gold medals or the most medals overall. At the Summer Games of 1896, 1912, 1964 and 2008; as well as at the Winter Games of 1980, 1984, 1994, 2002, 2010, and 2014, the winning nations were not identical according to the two counting methods.

The gold first ranking system is used by most of the world media, as well as the International Olympic Committee (IOC); and also listed here in the further statistics and tables. At this ranking system, the United States has placed first overall by Olympic medal table in the Summer Olympic Games nineteen times, followed by the Soviet Union with six overall victories (not including the 1992 first-place finish by the Unified Team). In the Winter Olympic Games, Norway has placed first overall eleven times and the Soviet Union (prior to its dissolution in 1991) had placed first seven times.

== Summer Olympics ==
=== List by Games ===
Games	1st place	Med	2nd place	Med	3rd place	Med	Nations with medals
1896 Athens (Kingdom of Greece)	United States	11	Greece	10	Germany	6	11
1896 Athens (Kingdom of Greece)	United States	7	Greece	17	Germany	5	11
1896 Athens (Kingdom of Greece)	United States	2	Greece	5	Germany	2	11
1900 Paris (French Third Republic)	France	31	United States	20	Great Britain	20	19
1900 Paris (French Third Republic)	France	41	United States	13	Great Britain	8	19
1900 Paris (French Third Republic)	France	40	United States	15	Great Britain	9	19
1904 St. Louis (United States)	United States	80	Germany	5	Canada	4	8
1904 St. Louis (United States)	United States	85	Germany	4	Canada	1	8
1904 St. Louis (United States)	United States	83	Germany	5	Canada	1	8
1908 London (United Kingdom)	Great Britain	56	United States	23	Sweden	8	19
1908 London (United Kingdom)	Great Britain	51	United States	12	Sweden	6	19
1908 London (United Kingdom)	Great Britain	39	United States	12	Sweden	11	19
1912 Stockholm (Sweden)	United States	26	Sweden	23	Great Britain	10	18
1912 Stockholm (Sweden)	United States	19	Sweden	25	Great Britain	15	18
1912 Stockholm (Sweden)	United States	19	Sweden	17	Great Britain	16	18
1920 Antwerp (Belgium)	United States	41	Sweden	19	Great Britain	15	22
1920 Antwerp (Belgium)	United States	27	Sweden	20	Great Britain	15	22
1920 Antwerp (Belgium)	United States	27	Sweden	25	Great Britain	13	22
1924 Paris (French Third Republic)	United States	45	Finland	14	France	13	27
1924 Paris (French Third Republic)	United States	27	Finland	13	France	15	27
1924 Paris (French Third Republic)	United States	27	Finland	10	France	10	27
1928 Amsterdam (Netherlands)	United States	22	Germany	10	Finland	8	33
1928 Amsterdam (Netherlands)	United States	18	Germany	7	Finland	8	33
1928 Amsterdam (Netherlands)	United States	16	Germany	14	Finland	9	33
1932 Los Angeles (United States)	United States	44	Italy	12	France	10	27
1932 Los Angeles (United States)	United States	36	Italy	12	France	5	27
1932 Los Angeles (United States)	United States	30	Italy	12	France	4	27
1936 Berlin (Nazi Germany)	Germany	38	United States	24	Hungary	10	32
1936 Berlin (Nazi Germany)	Germany	31	United States	21	Hungary	1	32
1936 Berlin (Nazi Germany)	Germany	32	United States	12	Hungary	5	32
1948 London (United Kingdom)	United States	38	Sweden	16	France	10	37
1948 London (United Kingdom)	United States	27	Sweden	11	France	6	37
1948 London (United Kingdom)	United States	19	Sweden	17	France	13	37
1952 Helsinki (Finland)	United States	40	Soviet Union	22	Hungary	16	43
1952 Helsinki (Finland)	United States	19	Soviet Union	30	Hungary	10	43
1952 Helsinki (Finland)	United States	17	Soviet Union	19	Hungary	16	43
1956 Melbourne (Australia)	Soviet Union	37	United States	32	Australia	13	38
1956 Melbourne (Australia)	Soviet Union	29	United States	25	Australia	8	38
1956 Melbourne (Australia)	Soviet Union	32	United States	17	Australia	14	38
1960 Rome (Italy)	Soviet Union	43	United States	34	Italy	13	44
1960 Rome (Italy)	Soviet Union	29	United States	21	Italy	10	44
1960 Rome (Italy)	Soviet Union	31	United States	16	Italy	13	44
1964 Tokyo (Japan)	United States	36	Soviet Union	30	Japan	16	41
1964 Tokyo (Japan)	United States	26	Soviet Union	31	Japan	5	41
1964 Tokyo (Japan)	United States	28	Soviet Union	35	Japan	29	41
1968 Mexico City	United States	45	Soviet Union	29	Japan	11	44
1968 Mexico City	United States	28	Soviet Union	32	Japan	7	44
1968 Mexico City	United States	34	Soviet Union	30	Japan	25	44
1972 Munich (West Germany)	Soviet Union	50	United States	33	East Germany	20	48
1972 Munich (West Germany)	Soviet Union	27	United States	31	East Germany	23	48
1972 Munich (West Germany)	Soviet Union	22	United States	30	East Germany	23	48
1976 Montreal (Canada)	Soviet Union	49	East Germany	40	United States	34	41
1976 Montreal (Canada)	Soviet Union	41	East Germany	25	United States	35	41
1976 Montreal (Canada)	Soviet Union	35	East Germany	25	United States	25	41
1980 Moscow (Soviet Union)	Soviet Union	80	East Germany	47	Bulgaria	8	36
1980 Moscow (Soviet Union)	Soviet Union	69	East Germany	37	Bulgaria	16	36
1980 Moscow (Soviet Union)	Soviet Union	46	East Germany	42	Bulgaria	17	36
1984 Los Angeles (United States)	United States	83	Romania	20	West Germany	17	47
1984 Los Angeles (United States)	United States	61	Romania	16	West Germany	19	47
1984 Los Angeles (United States)	United States	30	Romania	17	West Germany	23	47
1988 Seoul (South Korea)	Soviet Union	55	East Germany	37	United States	36	52
1988 Seoul (South Korea)	Soviet Union	31	East Germany	35	United States	30	52
1988 Seoul (South Korea)	Soviet Union	46	East Germany	30	United States	27	52
1992 Barcelona (Spain)	Unified Team	45	United States	37	Germany	33	64
1992 Barcelona (Spain)	Unified Team	38	United States	34	Germany	21	64
1992 Barcelona (Spain)	Unified Team	29	United States	37	Germany	28	64
1996 Atlanta (United States)	United States	44	Russia	26	Germany	20	79
1996 Atlanta (United States)	United States	32	Russia	21	Germany	18	79
1996 Atlanta (United States)	United States	25	Russia	16	Germany	27	79
2000 Sydney (Australia)	United States	37	Russia	32	China	28	80
2000 Sydney (Australia)	United States	24	Russia	28	China	16	80
2000 Sydney (Australia)	United States	33	Russia	29	China	14	80
2004 Athens (Greece)	United States	36	China	32	Russia	28	74
2004 Athens (Greece)	United States	39	China	17	Russia	26	74
2004 Athens (Greece)	United States	26	China	14	Russia	36	74
2008 Beijing (China)	China	48	United States	36	Russia	24	87
2008 Beijing (China)	China	22	United States	39	Russia	13	87
2008 Beijing (China)	China	30	United States	37	Russia	23	87
2012 London (United Kingdom)	United States	48	China	39	Great Britain	29	86
2012 London (United Kingdom)	United States	26	China	31	Great Britain	18	86
2012 London (United Kingdom)	United States	32	China	22	Great Britain	18	86
2016 Rio (Brazil)	United States	46	Great Britain	27	China	26	86
2016 Rio (Brazil)	United States	37	Great Britain	23	China	18	86
2016 Rio (Brazil)	United States	38	Great Britain	17	China	26	86
2020 Tokyo (Japan)	United States	39	China	38	Japan	27	93
2020 Tokyo (Japan)	United States	41	China	32	Japan	14	93
2020 Tokyo (Japan)	United States	33	China	19	Japan	17	93
2024 Paris (France)	United States	40	China	40	Japan	20	91
2024 Paris (France)	United States	44	China	27	Japan	12	91
2024 Paris (France)	United States	42	China	24	Japan	13	91

Only at four Summer Olympic Games did the leader in the medal standings not also win the most medals in total. In all these occasions, the second-place nation in the medal ranking won the most medals in total, and the first-place nation won the second-most:

- 1896: Greece (2nd place, 47 medals)
- 1912: Sweden (2nd place, 65 medals)
- 1964: Soviet Union (2nd place, 96 medals)
- 2008: United States (2nd place, 112 medals)

=== List by team ===
Summer Olympics
Rank	Nation	1st place	2nd place	3rd place
1	United States	19	8	2
2	Soviet Union	6	3	0
3	China	1	4	2
4	Germany	1	2	3
5	Great Britain	1	1	4
6	France	1	0	3
7	Unified Team	1	0	0
8	Sweden	0	3	1
8	East Germany	0	3	1
10	Russia	0	2	2
11	Finland	0	1	1
11	Italy	0	1	1
13	Greece	0	1	0
13	Romania	0	1	0
15	Japan	0	0	4
16	Hungary	0	0	2
17	Canada	0	0	1
17	Australia	0	0	1
17	Bulgaria	0	0	1
17	West Germany	0	0	1
Total	20 nations	30	30	30

== Winter Olympics ==
=== List by Games ===
Games	1st place	Med	2nd place	Med	3rd place	Med	Nations with medals
1924 Chamonix (French Third Republic)	Norway	4	Finland	4	Austria	2	10
1924 Chamonix (French Third Republic)	Norway	7	Finland	4	Austria	1	10
1924 Chamonix (French Third Republic)	Norway	6	Finland	3	Austria	0	10
1928 St. Moritz (Switzerland)	Norway	6	United States	2	Sweden	2	12
1928 St. Moritz (Switzerland)	Norway	4	United States	2	Sweden	2	12
1928 St. Moritz (Switzerland)	Norway	5	United States	2	Sweden	1	12
1932 Lake Placid (United States)	United States	6	Norway	3	Sweden	1	10
1932 Lake Placid (United States)	United States	4	Norway	4	Sweden	2	10
1932 Lake Placid (United States)	United States	2	Norway	3	Sweden	0	10
1936 Garmisch-Partenkirchen (Germany)	Norway	7	Germany	3	Sweden	2	11
1936 Garmisch-Partenkirchen (Germany)	Norway	5	Germany	3	Sweden	2	11
1936 Garmisch-Partenkirchen (Germany)	Norway	3	Germany	0	Sweden	3	11
1948 St. Moritz (Switzerland)	Norway; Sweden (tie for 1st place)	4	None		Switzerland	3	13
1948 St. Moritz (Switzerland)	Norway; Sweden (tie for 1st place)	3	None		Switzerland	4	13
1948 St. Moritz (Switzerland)	Norway; Sweden (tie for 1st place)	3	None		Switzerland	3	13
1952 Oslo (Norway)	Norway	7	United States	4	Finland	3	13
1952 Oslo (Norway)	Norway	3	United States	6	Finland	4	13
1952 Oslo (Norway)	Norway	6	United States	1	Finland	2	13
1956 Cortina d'Ampezzo (Italy)	Soviet Union	7	Austria	4	Finland	3	13
1956 Cortina d'Ampezzo (Italy)	Soviet Union	3	Austria	3	Finland	3	13
1956 Cortina d'Ampezzo (Italy)	Soviet Union	6	Austria	4	Finland	1	13
1960 Squaw Valley (United States)	Soviet Union	7	United Team of Germany	4	United States	3	14
1960 Squaw Valley (United States)	Soviet Union	5	United Team of Germany	3	United States	4	14
1960 Squaw Valley (United States)	Soviet Union	9	United Team of Germany	1	United States	3	14
1964 Innsbruck (Austria)	Soviet Union	11	Austria	4	Norway	3	14
1964 Innsbruck (Austria)	Soviet Union	8	Austria	5	Norway	6	14
1964 Innsbruck (Austria)	Soviet Union	6	Austria	3	Norway	6	14
1968 Grenoble (France)	Norway	6	Soviet Union	5	France	4	15
1968 Grenoble (France)	Norway	6	Soviet Union	5	France	3	15
1968 Grenoble (France)	Norway	2	Soviet Union	3	France	2	15
1972 Sapporo (Japan)	Soviet Union	8	East Germany	4	Switzerland	4	17
1972 Sapporo (Japan)	Soviet Union	5	East Germany	3	Switzerland	3	17
1972 Sapporo (Japan)	Soviet Union	3	East Germany	7	Switzerland	3	17
1976 Innsbruck (Austria)	Soviet Union	13	East Germany	7	United States	3	16
1976 Innsbruck (Austria)	Soviet Union	6	East Germany	5	United States	3	16
1976 Innsbruck (Austria)	Soviet Union	8	East Germany	7	United States	4	16
1980 Lake Placid (United States)	Soviet Union	10	East Germany	9	United States	6	19
1980 Lake Placid (United States)	Soviet Union	6	East Germany	7	United States	4	19
1980 Lake Placid (United States)	Soviet Union	6	East Germany	7	United States	2	19
1984 Sarajevo (Socialist Federal Republic of Yugoslavia)	East Germany	9	Soviet Union	6	United States	4	17
1984 Sarajevo (Socialist Federal Republic of Yugoslavia)	East Germany	9	Soviet Union	10	United States	4	17
1984 Sarajevo (Socialist Federal Republic of Yugoslavia)	East Germany	6	Soviet Union	9	United States	0	17
1988 Calgary (Canada)	Soviet Union	11	East Germany	9	Switzerland	5	17
1988 Calgary (Canada)	Soviet Union	9	East Germany	10	Switzerland	5	17
1988 Calgary (Canada)	Soviet Union	9	East Germany	6	Switzerland	5	17
1992 Albertville (France)	Germany	10	Unified Team	9	Norway	9	20
1992 Albertville (France)	Germany	10	Unified Team	6	Norway	6	20
1992 Albertville (France)	Germany	6	Unified Team	8	Norway	5	20
1994 Lillehammer (Norway)	Russia	11	Norway	10	Germany	9	22
1994 Lillehammer (Norway)	Russia	8	Norway	11	Germany	7	22
1994 Lillehammer (Norway)	Russia	4	Norway	5	Germany	8	22
1998 Nagano (Japan)	Germany	12	Norway	10	Russia	9	24
1998 Nagano (Japan)	Germany	9	Norway	10	Russia	6	24
1998 Nagano (Japan)	Germany	8	Norway	5	Russia	3	24
2002 Salt Lake City (United States)	Norway	13	Germany	12	United States	10	24
2002 Salt Lake City (United States)	Norway	5	Germany	16	United States	13	24
2002 Salt Lake City (United States)	Norway	7	Germany	8	United States	11	24
2006 Turin (Italy)	Germany	11	United States	9	Austria	9	26
2006 Turin (Italy)	Germany	12	United States	9	Austria	7	26
2006 Turin (Italy)	Germany	6	United States	7	Austria	7	26
2010 Vancouver (Canada)	Canada	14	Germany	10	United States	9	26
2010 Vancouver (Canada)	Canada	7	Germany	13	United States	15	26
2010 Vancouver (Canada)	Canada	5	Germany	7	United States	13	26
2014 Sochi (Russia)	Norway	11	Russia	10	Canada	10	26
2014 Sochi (Russia)	Norway	6	Russia	10	Canada	10	26
2014 Sochi (Russia)	Norway	10	Russia	9	Canada	5	26
2018 Pyeongchang (South Korea)	Norway	14	Germany	14	Canada	11	30
2018 Pyeongchang (South Korea)	Norway	14	Germany	10	Canada	8	30
2018 Pyeongchang (South Korea)	Norway	11	Germany	7	Canada	10	30
2022 Beijing (China)	Norway	16	Germany	12	United States	9	29
2022 Beijing (China)	Norway	8	Germany	10	United States	9	29
2022 Beijing (China)	Norway	13	Germany	5	United States	7	29
2026 Milano Cortina (Italy)	Norway	18	United States	12	Netherlands	10	30
2026 Milano Cortina (Italy)	Norway	12	United States	12	Netherlands	7	30
2026 Milano Cortina (Italy)	Norway	11	United States	9	Netherlands	3	30

Only at six Winter Olympic Games did the leader in the medal standings not also win the most medals in total. In almost all of these occasions, the second-place nation in the medal ranking won the most medals in total, except for one in which the third-place nation in the medal ranking won the most:

- 1980: East Germany (2nd place, 23 medals)
- 1984: Soviet Union (2nd place, 25 medals)
- 1994: Norway (2nd place, 26 medals)
- 2002: Germany (2nd place, 36 medals)
- 2010: United States (3rd place, 37 medals)
- 2014: Russia (2nd place, 29 medals)

=== List by team ===
Winter Olympics
Rank	Nation	1st place	2nd place	3rd place
1	Norway	11	3	2
2	Soviet Union	7	2	0
3	Germany	3	5	1
4	United States	1	4	7
5	East Germany	1	4	0
6	Sweden	1	0	3
7	Canada	1	0	2
8	Russia	1	1	1
9	Austria	0	2	2
10	Finland	0	1	2
11	United Team of Germany	0	1	0
11	Unified Team	0	1	0
13	Switzerland	0	0	3
14	France	0	0	1
14	Netherlands	0	0	1
Total	15 nations	26	24	25

== Sources ==
- Official site
- Database olympics
