= 2008–09 Bobsleigh World Cup =

Winners
- Combined men's: (Russia) Alexandre Zoubkov
- Two-man: (Switzerland) Beat Hefti
- Four-man: (Russia) Alexandre Zoubkov
- Two-woman: (Germany) Sandra Kiriasis

Competitions
- Venues: 8

The 2008–09 Bobsleigh World Cup was a multi race tournament over a season for bobsleigh. The season started on 24 November 2008 in Winterberg and ended on 14 February 2009 in Park City, Utah. The World Cup was organised by the FIBT who also run world cups and championships in skeleton.

== Calendar ==
Below is the schedule of the 2008/09 season.

Venue	Date	Details
Winterberg	24–30 November 2008	
Altenberg	1–7 December 2008	
Igls	8–14 December 2008	
~~Cesana Pariol~~	~~15–21 December 2008~~	Cancelled to excessive snowfall (2.5 meters)
Königssee	5–11 January 2009	
Sankt Moritz	11–18 January 2009	European Championship
Whistler	1–7 February 2009	
Park City	8–14 February 2009	
Lake Placid	16 February – 1 March 2009	FIBT World Championships 2009

=== Schedule update ===
On the 14 November 2008, on FIBT website it was announced that the competition at the bobsleigh track in Cortina d'Ampezzo was cancelled to technical issues and the competition for 5–11 January 2009 was moved to the Königssee track in Germany.

== Results ==
=== Two-man ===
Event:	Gold:	Time	Silver:	Time	Bronze:	Time
Winterberg	Beat Hefti; Thomas Lamparter; Switzerland	1:51.79 (55.86/55.93)	André Lange; Kevin Kuske; Germany	1:51.96 (55.98/55.98)	Thomas Florschuetz; Marc Kühne; Germany	1:52.09 (56.08/56.01)
Altenberg	André Lange; Kevin Kuske; Germany	1:52.60 (55.80/56.80)	Steven Holcomb; Justin Olsen; United States	1:52.85 (55.95/56.90)	Beat Hefti; Thomas Lamparter; Switzerland	1:53.11 (55.86/57.25)
Igls	Thomas Florschuetz; Marc Kühne; Germany	1:39.21 (49.56/49.65)	Beat Hefti; Thomas Lamparter; Switzerland	1:44.70 (52.24/52.46)	Steven Holcomb; Justin Olsen; United States	1:44.75 (52.37/52.38)
Königssee	Thomas Florschuetz; Marc Kühne; Germany	1:44.62 (52.20/52.42)	Ivo Rüegg; Cedric Grand; Switzerland	1:39.27 (49.54/49.73)	Alexandre Zoubkov; Dmitry Trunenkov; Alexey Voevoda; Russia; Karl Angerer; Alex Mann; Germany	1:39.31 (49.58/49.73); 1:39.31 (49.73/49.58)
St. Moritz	Pierre Lueders; David Bissett; Canada	2:14.34 (1:07.55/1:06.79)	Ivo Rüegg; Roman Handschin; Switzerland	2:14.64 (1:07.78/1:06.86)	Beat Hefti; Thomas Lamparter; Switzerland	2:15.08 (1:08.03/1:07.05)
St. Moritz	Pierre Lueders; David Bissett; Canada	2:12.08 (1:06.21/1:05.87)	André Lange; Martin Putze; Germany	2:12.10 (1:06.23/1:05.87)	Beat Hefti; Thomas Lamparter; Switzerland	2:12.23 (1:06.36/1:05.87)
Whistler	Thomas Florschuetz; Marc Kühne; Germany	1:43.95 (51.99/51.96)	Beat Hefti; Thomas Lamparter; Switzerland	1:44.03 (52.08/51.95)	Pierre Lueders; David Bissett; Canada	1:44.14 (51.98/52.16)
Park City	Alexandre Zoubkov; Alexey Voevoda; Russia	1:36.51 (48.26/48.25)	Thomas Florschuetz; Marc Kühne; Germany	1:36.68 (48.44/48.24)	Beat Hefti; Thomas Lamparter; Switzerland	1:36.69 (48.30/48.39)
Lake Placid	FIBT World Championships 2009					

=== Four-man ===
Event:	Gold:	Time	Silver:	Time	Bronze:	Time
Winterberg	André Lange; Alexander Rödiger; Kevin Kuske; Martin Putze; Germany	1:49.30 (54.76/54.54)	Alexandr Zubkov; Roman Oreshnikov; Dmitry Trunenkov; Dmitriy Stepushkin; Russia	1:49.63 (54.85/54.78)	Steven Holcomb; Justin Olsen; Steve Mesler; Curtis Tomasevicz; United States	1:49.82 (54.99/54.83)
Altenberg	Karl Angerer; Andreas Udvari; Matej Juhart; Gregor Bermbach; Germany	56.58	André Lange; Alexander Rödiger; Kevin Kuske; Martin Putze; Germany; Alexandr Zubkov; Roman Oreshnikov; Dmitry Trunenkov; Dmitriy Stepushkin; Russia	56.77		
Igls	Alexandr Zubkov; Roman Oreshnikov; Dmitry Trunenkov; Dmitriy Stepushkin; Russia	1:42.34 (51.15/51.19)	Steven Holcomb; Justin Olsen; Steve Mesler; Curtis Tomasevicz; United States	1:42.48 (51.25/51.23)	Dmitry Abramovitch; Philippe Egorov; Andrey Jurkov; Petr Moiseev; Russia	1:42.54 (51.27/51.27)
Königssee	Karl Angerer; Andreas Udvari; Alex Mann; Gregor Bermbach; Germany	1:37.84 (48.96/48.88)	Edwin van Calker; Arnold van Calker; Arno Klaassen; Sybren Jansma; Netherlands	1:37.93 (48.91/49.02)	André Lange; René Hoppe; Alexander Rödiger; Martin Putze; Germany; Janis Minins; Daumants Dreiškens; Oskars Melbardis; Intars Dambis; Latvia	1:37.94 (48.78/49.16) (48.83/49.11)
St. Moritz	Alexandr Zubkov; Roman Oreshnikov; Dmitry Trunenkov; Dmitriy Stepushkin; Russia	2:10.48 (1:05.20/1:05.28)	Thomas Florschütz; Marc Kühne; Andreas Barucha; Alex Metzger; Germany	2:10.79 (1:05.61/1:05.18)	Karl Angerer; Andreas Udvari; Thomas Pöge; Gregor Bermbach; Germany	2:10.81 (1:05.53/1:05.28)
Whistler	Janis Minins; Daumants Dreiškens; Oskars Melbardis; Intars Dambis; Latvia	1:42.17 (50.97/51.20)	Steven Holcomb; Justin Olsen; Steve Mesler; Curtis Tomasevicz; United States	1:42.23 (50.99/51.24)	Alexandr Zubkov; Philippe Egorov; Petr Moiseev; Alexey Andryunin; Russia	1:42.67 (51.18/51.49)
Park City	Steven Holcomb; Justin Olsen; Steve Mesler; Curtis Tomasevicz; United States	1:34.34 (47.03/47.31)	Janis Minins; Daumants Dreiškens; Oskars Melbardis; Intars Dambis; Latvia	1:34.57 (47.28/47.29)	Alexandr Zubkov; Roman Oreshnikov; Dmitry Trunenkov; Dmitriy Stepushkin; Russia	1:34.68 (47.26/47.42)
Park City	Steven Holcomb; Justin Olsen; Steve Mesler; Curtis Tomasevicz; United States	1:34.80 (47.60/47.20)	Janis Minins; Daumants Dreiškens; Oskars Melbardis; Intars Dambis; Latvia	1:35.35 (47.89/47.46)	Alexandr Zubkov; Roman Oreshnikov; Dmitry Trunenkov; Dmitriy Stepushkin; Russia	1:35.57 (48.04/47.53)
Lake Placid	FIBT World Championships 2009					

=== Two-woman ===
Event:	Gold:	Time	Silver:	Time	Bronze:	Time
Winterberg	Helen Upperton; Jennifer Ciochetti; Canada	1:55.86 (58.04/57.82)	Sandra Kiriasis; Romy Logsch; Germany	1:56.11 (58.33/57.78)	Cathleen Martini; Janine Tischer; Germany	1:56.39 (58.31/58.08)
Altenberg	Sandra Kiriasis; Berit Wiacker; Germany	1:55.71 (58.05/57.66)	Cathleen Martini; Janine Tischer; Germany	1:55.73 (57.79/57.94)	Shauna Rohbock; Elana Meyers; United States	1:56.12 (57.93/58.19)
Igls	Helen Upperton; Heather Moyse; Canada	1:49.07 (54.61/54.46)	Shauna Rohbock; Valerie Fleming; United States	1:49.21 (54.69/54.52)	Sandra Kiriasis; Romy Logsch; Germany	1:49.23 (54.68/54.55)
Königssee	Shauna Rohbock; Valerie Fleming; United States	1:41.91 (50.78/51.13)	Nicole Minichiello; Gillian Cooke; United Kingdom; Sandra Kiriasis; Romy Logsch; Germany	1:42.05 (50.87/51.18); 1:42.05 (51.02/51.03)		
St. Moritz	Sandra Kiriasis; Berit Wiacker; Germany	2:17.34 (1:08.75/1:08.59)	Cathleen Martini; Janine Tischer; Germany	2:17.36 (1:08.85/1:08.51)	Nicole Minichiello; Jackie Gunn; United Kingdom	2:17.70 (1:08.75/1:08.95)
St. Moritz	Sandra Kiriasis; Berit Wiacker; Germany	2:17.40 (1:09.20/1:08.20)	Cathleen Martini; Janine Tischer; Germany	2:18.36 (1:09.73/1:08.63)	Nicole Minichiello; Gillian Cooke; United Kingdom	2:18.75 (1:09.68/1:09.07)
Whistler	Shauna Rohbock; Elana Meyers; United States	1:47.10 (53.57/53.53)	Kaillie Humphries; Heather Moyse; Canada	1:47.28 (53.62/53.66)	Erin Pac; Michelle Rzepka; United States	1:47.40 (53.70/53.70)
Park City	Cathleen Martini; Janine Tischer; Germany	1:38.66 (49.28/49.38)	Kaillie Humphries; Shelley-Ann Brown; Canada	1:38.84 (49.30/49.54)	Sandra Kiriasis; Patricia Polifka; Germany	1:39.34 (49.67/49.67)
Lake Placid	FIBT World Championships 2009					

== Standings ==
=== Two-man ===
Pos.	Bobsledder	WIN	ALT	IGL	KON	SMO 1	SMO 2	WHI	PAR	Points
1.	(Switzerland) Beat Hefti	1	3	2	11	3	3	2	3	1581
2.	(Germany) André Lange	2	1	4	7	11	2	5	6	1501
3.	(Germany) Thomas Florschuetz	3		1	1	6	4	1	2	1453
4.	(Switzerland) Ivo Rüegg	16	5	8	2	2	8	5	4	1396
5.	(Russia) Alexandre Zoubkov	10	8	7	3	13	11	7	1	1321
6.	(Italy) Simone Bertazzo	8	15	9	10	5	10	14	8	1160
7.	(Austria) Wolfgang Stampfer	19	10	10	14	7	5	13	10	1090
8.	(Canada) Pierre Lueders	5		18	dsq	1	1	3	7	1082
9	(Switzerland) Daniel Schmid	11	7	10	9	15	12	12	22	1016
10.	(United States) Todd Hays	8	9	6	5	13	13	16		1008
11.	(Canada) Lyndon Rush	14	14	12	13	16	18	4	13	960
12.	(Latvia) Jānis Miņins	22	19	19	12	4	7	9	21	906
13.	(Monaco) Patrice Servelle	15	11	16	8	18	15	20	12	876
14.	(United States) Steven Holcomb	12	2	3				8	9	850
15.	(Germany) Karl Angerer		13		3	12	6	18	11	840
16.	(Latvia) Edgars Maskalāns	17	12	17	18	10	14	15	16	840
17.	(Netherlands) Edwin Van Calker	6	23	20	6	19	17	18	15	816
18.	(Austria) Jürgen Loacker	17	17	13		9	9	17	16	784
19.	(Czech Republic) Ivo Danilevič	21	18	dsq	15	8	22	21	14	636
20.	(United Kingdom) Lee Johnston	13	20	21	16	20	20	22	25	578

=== Four-man ===
Pos.	Bobsledder	WIN	ALT	IGL	KON	SMO	WHI	PAR 1	PAR 2	Points
1.	(Russia) Alexandre Zoubkov	2	2	1	6	1	3	3	3	1646
2.	(Latvia) Jānis Miņins	6	4	4	3	10	1	2	2	1549
3.	(Germany) André Lange	1	2	7	3	9		7	12	1251
4.	(United States) Steven Holcomb	3	7	2			2	1	1	1238
5.	(Austria) Wolfgang Stampfer	8	12	9	5	4	7	9	17	1224
6.	(Switzerland) Ivo Rüegg	14	6	13	15	7	8	5	4	1216
7.	(Switzerland) Beat Hefti	12	22	11	10	6	6	4	6	1184
8.	(Germany) Karl Angerer		1		1	3	9	6	11	1114
9.	(Netherlands) Edwin Van Calker	5	16	5	2	13		10	9	1098
10.	(Canada) Pierre Lueders	11		17	8	8	4	12	7	1032
11.	(Latvia) Edgars Maskalāns	14	5	15	11	12	21	11	10	1006
12.	(Germany) Thomas Florschuetz	9		6	13	2	11	15	19	972
13.	(United States) Todd Hays	13	19	9	9	5	5			866
14.	(United Kingdom) Lee Johnston	10	19	11	14	15	12		16	794
15.	(Canada) Lyndon Rush	22	15	14	18	23	14	14	13	746
16.	(Russia) Dmitry Abramovitch			3	7			8	8	688
17.	(Czech Republic) Ivo Danilevič	21	18	22	12	22	13	20	15	674
18.	(Switzerland) Daniel Schmid	17	13	16	19	11		16	21	672
19.	(Monaco) Patrice Servelle	20	11	20	17	18	15	21	24	651
20.	(Italy) Simone Bertazzo	18	14	24	21	19	18	19	18	607

=== Two-woman ===
Pos.	Bobsledder	WIN	ALT	IGL	KON	SMO 1	SMO 2	WHI	PAR	Points
1.	(Germany) Sandra Kiriasis	2	1	3	2	1	1	5	3	1679
2.	(Germany) Cathleen Martini	3	2	5	4	2	2	7	1	1599
3.	(United Kingdom) Nicole Minichiello	9	7	6	2	3	3	9	6	1434
4.	(United States) Shauna Rohbock	7	3	2	1	6	6	1		1380
5.	(Germany) Claudia Schramm	5	5	9	7	4	7	10	7	1360
6.	(Canada) Helen Upperton	1	4	1	9	10	5	4		1314
7.	(Canada) Kaillie Humphries	6	8	7	5	5	dnf	2	2	1292
8.	(Switzerland) Sabrina Hafner	10	6	8	8	7	8	12	4	1288
9.	(United States) Erin Pac	4	10	4	6	9	4	3		1248
10.	(Netherlands) Esme Kamphuis	13	11	10	10	11	9	8	8	1152
11.	(Switzerland) Fabienne Meyer	15	13	11	11	8	10	14	14	1024
12.	(Russia) Victoria Tokovaia	11	11	14	13	12	15	13	10	1000
13.	(Italy) Jessica Gillarduzzi	12		16	14	15	12	15	12	800
14.	(Switzerland) Isabel Baumann	14		15	12	14	11	16		688
15.	(Japan) Manami Hino	19	dns	18	15	16	13	18	15	658
16.	(Canada) Lisa Szabon	8	9	13	17	13	dsq			640
17.	(Russia) Anastasia Skulkina	17	15		16	17	17			464
18.	(Italy) Francesca Iossi	16		17	18	19	14			450
19.	(Romania) Carmen Radenovici	21		19	20	18	16			380
20.	(Austria) Christina Hengster	20	14	12				20		376
