= February 2009 in sports =

| << | February 2009 | | | | | >> |
| Su | Mo | Tu | We | Th | Fr | Sa |
| 1 | 2 | 3 | 4 | 5 | 6 | 7 |
| 8 | 9 | 10 | 11 | 12 | 13 | 14 |
| 15 | 16 | 17 | 18 | 19 | 20 | 21 |
| 22 | 23 | 24 | 25 | 26 | 27 | 28 |
Sports

This list shows notable sports-related deaths, events, and notable outcomes that occurred in February of 2009.

== Deaths in February ==
- 1: Jim McWithey
- 2: Paul Birch

== Current sporting seasons ==
=== Auto racing 2008 ===
- Sprint Cup
- Nationwide Series
- Camping World Truck Series
- A1 Grand Prix
- GP2 Asia Series
- Speedcar Series
- Rolex Sports Car Series

=== Basketball 2008–09 ===
- NBA
- American competitions:
  - NCAA men
  - NCAA women
- Pan-European competitions:
  - Euroleague
  - Eurocup
  - EuroChallenge
- Australia
- Greece
- Iran
- Israel
- Italy
- Philippines
- Spain
  - Spanish second division
- Turkey

=== Football (soccer) ===
- 2008–09
  - 2010 FIFA World Cup Qualifying
  - UEFA (Europe) Champions League
  - UEFA Cup
  - Copa Libertadores (South America)
  - CONCACAF (North & Central America) Champions League
  - OFC (Oceania) Champions League
  - AFC (Asia) Champions League
  - CAF (Africa) Champions League
  - England
  - Germany
  - Iran
  - Italy
  - Spain
  - France
  - Argentina

=== Golf 2009 ===
- European Tour
- PGA Tour
- LPGA Tour

=== Ice hockey 2008–09 ===
- National Hockey League
- Kontinental Hockey League

=== Rugby league 2009 ===
- Super League

=== Rugby union 2008–09 ===
- Heineken Cup
- English Premiership
- Celtic League
- Top 14
- Super 14
- Sevens World Series

=== Winter sports ===
- Alpine Skiing World Cup
- Biathlon World Cup
- Cross-Country Skiing World Cup
- Freestyle Skiing World Cup
- Nordic Combined World Cup
- Ski Jumping World Cup
- Snowboard World Cup
- Speed Skating World Cup

== Days of the month ==
=== 28 February 2009 (Saturday) ===
==== Auto racing ====
- Nationwide Series:
  - Sam's Town 300 in Las Vegas, Nevada
    - (1) Greg Biffle (Washington (state)) (2) Carl Edwards (Missouri) (3) Brian Vickers (North Carolina)

==== Cricket ====
- England in West Indies:
  - 4th Test in Bridgetown, Barbados, day 3:
    - England 600/6d; West Indies 398/5 (Ramnaresh Sarwan 184*). West Indies trail by 202 runs with 5 wickets remaining in the first innings.
- Australia in South Africa:
  - 1st Test in Johannesburg, day 3:
    - Australia 466 and 51/1; South Africa 220 (AB de Villiers 104*). Australia led by 297 runs with 9 wickets remaining.

==== Football (soccer) ====
- A-League Grand Final in Melbourne:
  - **Melbourne Victory** 1–0 Adelaide United
    - Victory win their second A-League Grand Final thanks to a 60th-minute strike from Tom Pondeljak.

==== Rugby union ====
- Six Nations Championship, week 3:
  - Scotland 26–6 Italy in Edinburgh
  - Ireland 14–13 England in Dublin
    - Ireland score its third win and lead the standings on 6 points, ahead of France and Wales with 4 points.

==== Tennis ====
- ATP Tour:
  - Dubai Tennis Championships in Dubai, United Arab Emirates:
    - Final: (Serbia) **Novak Djokovic** def. (Spain) David Ferrer 7–5, 6–3
  - Abierto Mexicano Telcel in Acapulco, Mexico:
    - Final: (Spain) **Nicolás Almagro** def. (France) Gaël Monfils, 6–4, 6–4
      - Almagro successfully defends his title from last year.
- WTA Tour:
  - Abierto Mexicano Telcel in Acapulco, Mexico:
    - Final: (United States) **Venus Williams** def. (Italy) Flavia Pennetta 6–1, 6–2
      - Venus Williams wins two tournaments in successive weeks.

==== Winter sports ====
===== Alpine skiing =====
- Women's World Cup in Bansko, Bulgaria:
  - downhill: (1) Andrea Fischbacher (Austria) 1:45.81 (2) Tina Maze (Slovenia) 1:46.07 (3) Fabienne Suter (Switzerland) 1:46.20
    - World Cup overall standings (after 27 of 34 races): (1) Lindsey Vonn (United States) 1456 points (2) Maria Riesch (Germany) 1120 (3) Anja Pärson (Sweden) 960
    - World Cup downhill standings (after 6 of 7 races): (1) Vonn 410 points (2) Dominique Gisin (Switzerland) 291 (3) Fischbacher 281
      - Vonn secures the World Cup downhill title.
- Men's World Cup in Kranjska Gora, Slovenia:
  - Giant slalom: (1) Ted Ligety (United States) 2:19.92 (2) Didier Cuche (Switzerland) 2:20.11 (3) Massimiliano Blardone (Italy) 2:20.26
    - World Cup overall standings (after 30 of 38 races): (1) Ivica Kostelic (Croatia) 813 points (2) Benjamin Raich (Austria) 785 (3) Jean Baptiste Grange (France) 775

===== Cross-country skiing =====
- Nordic World Ski Championships in Liberec, Czech Republic:
  - 30 km Freestyle Mass Start women: (1) Justyna Kowalczyk (Poland) 1:16:10.6 (2) Yevgeniya Medvedeva (Russia) 1:16:19.4 (3) Valentina Shevchenko (Ukraine) 1:16:19.9
    - Kowalczyk wins her second title of the championships.

===== Figure skating =====
- World Junior Championships in Sofia, Bulgaria:
  - Ladies: (1) Alena Leonova (Russia) 157.18 points (2) Caroline Zhang (United States) 154.67 (3) Ashley Wagner (United States) 153.57.

===== Nordic combined =====
- Nordic World Ski Championships in Liberec, Czech Republic:
  - Gundersen HS134/10.0 km men: (1) Bill Demong (United States) 23mins 36.6secs (8) (2) Bjoern Kircheisen (Germany) at 12.8 (7) (3) Jason Lamy-Chappuis (France) 31.4 (1)

===== Skeleton =====
- World Championships at Lake Placid, New York, United States:
  - Men: (1) Gregor Staehli (Switzerland) 2.46.58 (2) Adam Pengilly (United Kingdom) +0.35 (3) Aleksandr Tretyakov (Russia) +0.51

===== Ski jumping =====
- Nordic World Ski Championships in Liberec, Czech Republic:
  - Team HS134 men: (1) Austria 1034.3 points (Wolfgang Loitzl, Martin Koch, Thomas Morgenstern, Gregor Schlierenzauer) (2) Norway 1000.8 (Anders Bardal, Tom Hilde, Johan Remen Evensen, Anders Jacobsen) (3) Japan 981.2 (Shohhei Tochimoto, Takanobu Okabe, Daiki Ito, Noriaki Kasai)

===== Snowboarding =====
- World Cup in Sunday River, United States:
  - Snowboardcross men: (1) Graham Watanabe (United States) (2) Lukas Grüner (Austria) (3) Ross Powers (United States)
  - Snowboardcross women: (1) Maëlle Ricker (Canada) (2) Helene Olafsen (Norway) (3) Mellie Francon (Switzerland)

=== 27 February 2009 (Friday) ===
==== Cricket ====
- England in West Indies:
  - 4th Test in Bridgetown, Barbados, day 2:
    - England 600/6d (Ravi Bopara 104, Paul Collingwood 96); West Indies 85/1. West Indies trail by 515 runs with 9 wickets remaining in the first innings.
- Australia in South Africa:
  - 1st Test in Johannesburg, day 2:
    - Australia 466 (Marcus North 117); South Africa 85/3. South Africa trail by 381 runs with 7 wickets remaining in the first innings.
- India in New Zealand:
  - 2nd Twenty20 in Wellington:
    - India 149/6 (20/20 ov); New Zealand 150/5 (20/20 ov). **New Zealand win by 5 wickets on the last ball and win the series 2–0**.

==== Rugby union ====
- Six Nations Championship, week 3:
  - France 21–16 Wales in Paris
    - In the tournament's first ever Friday night match, France rallied from ten points behind to stop Wales' winning streak at eight matches, and inflict coach Warren Gatland's first defeat as Welsh head coach.

==== Winter sports ====
===== Alpine skiing =====
- Women's World Cup in Bansko, Bulgaria:
  - downhill: (1) Fabienne Suter (Switzerland) 1:45.68 (2) Andrea Fischbacher (Austria) 1:46.83 (3) Nadia Fanchini (Italy) & Lindsey Vonn (United States) 1:46.92
    - Overall World Cup standings (after 26 of 34 races): (1) Vonn 1434 points (2) Maria Riesch (Germany) 1088 (3) Anja Pärson (Sweden) 960

===== Cross-country skiing =====
- Nordic World Ski Championships in Liberec, Czech Republic:
  - 4x10 km Relay men: (1) Norway (Eldar Rønning, Odd-Bjørn Hjelmeset, Tore Ruud Hofstad, Petter Northug) 1-hour 41mins 50.6secs, (2) Germany (Jens Filbrich, Tobias Angerer, Franz Göring, Axel Teichmann) at 2.6secs, (3) Finland (Matti Heikkinen, Sami Jauhojärvi, Teemu Kattilakoski, Ville Nousiainen) 43.9

===== Figure skating =====
- World Junior Championships in Sofia, Bulgaria:
  - Ice dancing: (1) Madison Chock/Greg Zuerlein (United States) 172.55 points (2) Maia Shibutani/Alex Shibutani (United States) 162.15 (3) Ekaterina Riazanova/Jonathan Guerreiro (Russia) 161.80

===== Skeleton =====
- World Championships at Lake Placid, New York, United States:
  - Women: (1) Marion Trott (Germany) 3:47.97 (2) Amy Williams (United Kingdom) +0.59 (3) Kerstin Szymkowiak (Germany) +0.64

===== Ski jumping =====
- Nordic World Ski Championships in Liberec, Czech Republic:
  - HS134 men: (1) Andreas Küttel (Switzerland) 141.3 points (133.5m) (2) Martin Schmitt (Germany) 140.9 (133.0) (3) Anders Jacobsen (Norway) 139.5 (132.5)
    - The competition is reduced to one jump only due to bad weather.

=== 26 February 2009 (Thursday) ===
==== Basketball ====
- Euroleague Top 16, week 4:
  - Group E:
    - Olympiacos (Greece) 84–71 (Poland) Asseco Prokom Sopot
      - Olympiacos and TAU Cerámica lead the group on 3–1. Sopot (0–4) is eliminated from quarterfinals contention.
  - Group F:
    - Maccabi Tel Aviv (Israel) 69–73 (Spain) Real Madrid
      - Real Madrid (4–0) score its first win in Tel Aviv in 13 years and advance to the quarterfinals. Maccabi is 0–5 against Spanish teams this season.
    - ALBA Berlin (Germany) 57–75 (Spain) Regal FC Barcelona
      - Barcelona (3–1) is on the brink of qualifying to the quarterfinals, while ALBA (0–4) is eliminated.
  - Group G:
    - Lottomatica Roma (Italy) 71–90 (Greece) Panathinaikos
      - Panathinaikos (4–0) and Partizan (3–1) advance to the quarterfinals, while Roma and Málaga are eliminated.

==== Cricket ====
- England in West Indies:
  - 4th Test in Bridgetown, Barbados, day 1:
    - England 301/3 (Andrew Strauss 142, Alastair Cook 94)
- Australia in South Africa:
  - 1st Test in Johannesburg, day 1:
    - Australia 254/5 (Ricky Ponting 83)

==== Football (soccer) ====
- UEFA Cup round of 32, second leg:
  (Teams in **bold** advance to the last-16 round; first leg score in parentheses)
  - **CSKA Moscow** (Russia) 2–0 (1–1) (England) Aston Villa
  - **Metalist Kharkiv** (Ukraine) 2–0 (1–0) (Italy) Sampdoria
  - **Hamburg** (Germany) 1–0 (3–0) (Netherlands) NEC
  - Twente (Netherlands) 0–1(AET) (1–0) (France) **Marseille**
    - Marseille wins 7–6 on penalties.
  - Wolfsburg (Germany) 1–3 (0–2) (France) **Paris Saint-Germain**
  - **Galatasaray** (Turkey) 4–3 (0–0) (France) Bordeaux
  - Stuttgart (Germany) 1–2 (1–2) (Russia) **Zenit St. Petersburg**
  - Milan (Italy) 2–2 (1–1) (Germany) **Werder Bremen**
    - Bremen win on away goals.
  - Standard Liège (Belgium) 1–1 (0–3) (Portugal) **Braga**
  - **Udinese** (Italy) 2–1 (2–2) (Poland) Lech Poznań
  - **Manchester City** (England) 2–1 (2–2) (Denmark) Copenhagen
  - **Ajax** (Netherlands) 1–1 (1–0) (Italy) Fiorentina
  - **Saint-Étienne** (France) 2–1 (3–1) (Greece) Olympiacos
  - Deportivo (Spain) 1–3 (0–3) (Denmark) **Aalborg BK**
  - Tottenham Hotspur (England) 1–1 (0–2) (Ukraine) **Shakhtar Donetsk**
  - Valencia (Spain) 2–2 (1–1) (Ukraine) **Dynamo Kyiv**
    - Dynamo win on away goals.
- Copa Libertadores group stage:
  - Group 5:
    - Estudiantes (Argentina) 1–0 (Bolivia) Universitario de Sucre
  - Group 8:
    - San Luis (Mexico) 0–1 (Paraguay) Libertad
- CONCACAF Champions League Quarterfinals, first leg:
  - Puerto Rico Islanders 2–1 (Honduras) Marathón

==== Winter sports ====
===== Cross-country skiing =====
- Nordic World Ski Championships in Liberec, Czech Republic:
  - 4x5 km Relay women: (1) Finland (Pirjo Muranen, Virpi Kuitunen, Riitta-Liisa Roponen, Aino-Kaisa Saarinen) 54mins 24.3seconds (2) Germany (Katrin Zeller, Evi Sachenbacher-Stehle, Miriam Gössner, Claudia Künzel-Nystad) at 13.0 (3) Sweden (Lina Andersson, Britta Norgren, Anna Haag, Charlotte Kalla) 13.4
    - Saarinen wins her third title and fourth medal of the championships.

===== Figure skating =====
- World Junior Championships in Sofia, Bulgaria:
  - Men: (1) Adam Rippon (United States) 222.00 (2) Michal Březina (Czech Republic) 204.88 (3) Artem Grigoriev (Russia) 184.40

===== Nordic combined =====
- Nordic World Ski Championships in Liberec, Czech Republic:
  - Team HS134/4x5 km men: (1) Japan 48mins 32.3secs (Yusuke Minato, Taihei Kato, Akito Watabe, Norihito Kobayashi) (2) Germany at 0.1 (Ronny Ackermann, Eric Frenzel, Björn Kircheisen, Tino Edelmann) (3) Norway 3.6 (Mikko Kokslien, Petter Tande, Jan Schmid, Magnus Moan)

===== Snowboarding =====
- World Cup in Sunday River, United States:
  - Parallel GS men: (1) Benjamin Karl (Austria) (2) Siegfried Grabner (Austria) (3) Jasey Jay Anderson (Canada)
  - Parallel GS women: (1) Amelie Kober (Germany) (2) Tomoka Takeuchi (Japan) (3) Alexa Loo (Canada)

=== 25 February 2009 (Wednesday) ===
==== Basketball ====
- Euroleague Top 16, week 4:
  - Group E:
    - AJ Milano (Italy) 74–107 (Spain) TAU Cerámica
  - Group G:
    - Unicaja Málaga (Spain) 74–78 (OT) (Serbia) Partizan Igokea
  - Group H:
    - CSKA Moscow (Russia) 95–71 (Italy) Montepaschi Siena
    - Fenerbahçe Ülker (Turkey) 64–86 (Croatia) Cibona Zagreb

==== Cricket ====
- Sri Lanka in Pakistan:
  - 1st Test in Karachi, day 5:
    - Sri Lanka 644/7d & 144/5 (Kumar Sangakkara 65); Pakistan 765/6d (Younis Khan 313). **Match drawn.**
- India in New Zealand:
  - 1st Twenty20 in Christchurch:
    - India 162/8 (Suresh Raina 61*); New Zealand 166/3 (18.5 ov) (Brendon McCullum 56*). **New Zealand win by 7 wickets and lead the 2-match Twenty20 series 1–0.**

==== Football (soccer) ====
- Champions League First knockout round, first leg:
  - Chelsea (England) 1–0 (Italy) Juventus
  - Villarreal (Spain) 1–1 (Greece) Panathinaikos
  - Sporting Lisbon (Portugal) 0–5 (Germany) Bayern Munich
  - Real Madrid (Spain) 0–1 (England) Liverpool
- Copa Libertadores group stage:
  - Group 5:
    - Deportivo Quito (Ecuador) 1–1 (Brazil) Cruzeiro
  - Group 6:
    - Caracas (Venezuela) 3–1 (Argentina) Lanús
    - Guadalajara (Mexico) 6–2 (Chile) Everton
  - Group 7:
    - Grêmio (Brazil) 0–0 Universidad de Chile
- CONCACAF Champions League quarterfinals, first leg:
  - Montreal Impact (Canada) 2–0 (Mexico) Santos Laguna
  - Cruz Azul (Mexico) 1–0 (Mexico) UNAM

==== Winter sports ====
===== Cross-country skiing =====
- Nordic World Ski Championships in Liberec, Czech Republic:
  - 1.3 km Classic Team Sprint women: (1) Finland (Aino-Kaisa Saarinen/Virpi Kuitunen) 19mins 43.7secs (2) Sweden (Anna Olsson/Lina Andersson) at 20.0 (3) Italy (Marianna Longa/Arianna Follis) 23.8
    - Saarinen wins her second title and third medal of the championships.
  - 1.6 km Classic Team Sprint men: (1) Norway (Johan Kjølstad/Ola Vigen Hattestad) 22mins 48.5secs (2) Germany (Tobias Angerer/Axel Teichmann) at 0.5 (3) Finland (Ville Nousiainen/Sami Jauhojärvi) 0.5
    - Hattestad wins a second title a day after he won the individual sprint.

===== Figure skating =====
- World Junior Championships in Sofia, Bulgaria:
  - Pairs: (1) Lubov Iliushechkina/Nodari Maisuradze (Russia) 144.32 (2) Anastasia Martiusheva/Alexei Rogonov (Russia) 138.59 (3) Marissa Castelli/Simon Shnapir (United States) 137.47

=== 24 February 2009 (Tuesday) ===
==== Cricket ====
- Sri Lanka in Pakistan:
  - 1st Test in Karachi, day 4:
    - Sri Lanka 644/7d; Pakistan 574/5 (Younis Khan 306*). Pakistan trail by 70 runs with 5 wickets remaining in the first innings.
      The Test sees two historic milestones:
      - For the first time in Test history, both captains (Younis and Mahela Jayawardene) hit innings of 200 or more.
      - The three double centuries so far in the match tie a Test record set in 1965 by the West Indies and Australia.

==== Football (soccer) ====
- Champions League First knockout round, first leg:
  - Atlético Madrid (Spain) 2–2 (Portugal) Porto
  - Lyon (France) 1–1 (Spain) Barcelona
  - Arsenal (England) 1–0 (Italy) Roma
  - Internazionale (Italy) 0–0 (England) Manchester United
- Copa Libertadores group stage:
  - Group 2:
    - Deportivo Cuenca (Ecuador) 4–0 (Paraguay) Guaraní
  - Group 4:
    - Independiente Medellín (Colombia) 0–0 (Uruguay) Defensor Sporting
- CONCACAF Champions League quarterfinals, first leg:
  - Houston Dynamo (United States) 1–1 (Mexico) Atlante

==== Winter sports ====
===== Cross-country skiing =====
- Nordic World Ski Championships in Liberec, Czech Republic:
  - 1.3 km Freestyle Sprint women: (1) Arianna Follis (Italy) (2) Kikkan Randall (United States) (3) Pirjo Muranen (Finland)
  - 1.6 km Freestyle Sprint men: (1) Ola Vigen Hattestad (Norway) (2) Johan Kjølstad (Norway) (3) Nikolay Morilov (Russia)

===== Freestyle skiing =====
- World Cup in Branäs, Sweden:
  - Skicross men: (1) Lars Lewen (Sweden) (2) Christopher Delbosco (Canada) (3) Michael Schmid (Switzerland)
  - Skicross women: (1) Ophelie David (France) (2) Karin Huttary (Austria) (3) Ashleigh Mcivor (Canada)

=== 23 February 2009 (Monday) ===
==== Cricket ====
- Sri Lanka in Pakistan:
  - 1st Test in Karachi, day 3:
    - Sri Lanka 644/7d; Pakistan 296/3 (Younis Khan 149*). Pakistan trail by 348 runs with 7 wickets remaining in the first innings.

=== 22 February 2009 (Sunday) ===
==== Auto racing ====
- Sprint Cup Series:
  - Auto Club 500 in Fontana, California:
    - (1) Matt Kenseth (Wisconsin) (2) Jeff Gordon (California) (3) Kyle Busch (Nevada)
      - Kenseth, who won the Daytona 500 last week, becomes the first driver to win the first two races of a Cup season since Gordon in 1997.
- A1 Grand Prix:
  - Grand Prix of Nations, South Africa in Midrand, South Africa:
    - Sprint Race: (1) Netherlands (Jeroen Bleekemolen) (2) Portugal (Filipe Albuquerque) (3) Switzerland (Neel Jani)
    - Feature Race: (1) Switzerland (2) Brazil (Felipe Guimarães) (3) Monaco (Clivio Piccione)
      - Standings: (1) Switzerland 73 (2) Ireland (Republic of Ireland) 70 (3) Portugal 64

==== Basketball ====
- Greek Cup Final in Ellinikon:
  - Olympiacos 70–80 **Panathinaikos**
- Italian Cup Final in Casalecchio di Reno:
  - **Montepaschi Siena** 70–69 Virtus Bologna
- Spanish Cup Final in Madrid:
  - **TAU Cerámica** 100–98 (OT) Unicaja Málaga
- French Cup Final in Le Havre:
  - Orléans 64–74 **Le Mans**
- Turkish Cup Final in İzmir:
  - **Efes Pilsen** 79–70 Erdemirspor

==== Cricket ====
- Sri Lanka in Pakistan:
  - 1st Test in Karachi, day 2:
    - Sri Lanka 644/7d (Mahela Jayawardene 240, Thilan Samaraweera 231); Pakistan 44/1. Pakistan trail by 600 runs with 9 wickets remaining in the first innings.
      - Jayawardene and Samaraweera put on a stand of 437 for the fourth wicket – breaking the world record of 411 set in May 1957 by England's Peter May and Colin Cowdrey. The 437 stand is also the eighth-highest recorded stand in the history of Test cricket, and is the fourth-highest stand in Sri Lankan history.

==== Golf ====
- PGA Tour:
  - Northern Trust Open in Pacific Palisades, California:
    - Winner: Phil Mickelson (United States) 269 (−15)
      - Mickelson successfully defends his title from last year.
- European Tour:
  - Johnnie Walker Classic in Perth, Australia:
    - Winner: Danny Lee (am) (New Zealand) 271 (−17)
      - Lee becomes the youngest winner in European Tour history, aged 18 years and 213 days – breaking the record of Dale Hayes, who was 77 days older when he won the 1971 Dutch Open. As Lee is an amateur, he is not entitled to the prize money of $304,286.

==== Snooker ====
- Welsh Open in Newport, United Kingdom:
  - Final: **Ali Carter** (England) 9–5 (Northern Ireland) Joe Swail

==== Tennis ====
- ATP Tour:
  - Open 13 in Marseille, France:
    - Final: **(France) Jo-Wilfried Tsonga** def. (France) Michaël Llodra, 7–5, 7–6(3)
      - Tsonga wins his second title in three weeks.
  - Copa Telmex in Buenos Aires, Argentina:
    - Final: (Spain) **Tommy Robredo** def. (Argentina) Juan Mónaco, 7–5, 2–6, 7–6(5)
      - Robredo wins a title for the second consecutive week.
  - Regions Morgan Keegan Championships and the Cellular South Cup in Memphis, Tennessee, United States:
    - Final: (United States) **Andy Roddick** def. (Czech Republic) Radek Štěpánek, 7–5, 7–5
- WTA Tour:
  - Copa Colsanitas in Bogotá, Colombia:
    - Final: (Spain) **María José Martínez Sánchez** def. (Argentina) Gisela Dulko, 6–3, 6–2
      - Martínez wins the first WTA title of her career.

==== Winter sports ====
===== Alpine skiing =====
- Women's World Cup in Tarvisio, Italy:
  - Super giant slalom: (1) Lindsey Vonn (United States) 1min 21.72sec (2) Fabienne Suter (Switzerland) 1:22.23 (3) Tina Maze (Slovenia) 1:22.39
    - Overall World Cup standings (after 25 of 34 events): (1) Vonn 1374 points (2) Maria Riesch (Germany) 1075 (3) Anja Pärson (Sweden) 960
- Men's World Cup in Sestriere, Italy:
  - Super combined: (1) Romed Baumann (Austria) 2:25.73 (2) Julien Lizeroux (France) 2:26.05 (3) Carlo Janka (Switzerland) & Christof Innerhofer (Italy) 2:26.41
    - Overall World Cup standings (after 29 of 38 events): (1) Ivica Kostelic (Croatia) 802 points (2) Jean-Baptiste Grange (France) 771 (3) Benjamin Raich (Austria) 769
    - Final Combined World Cup standings: (1) Janka 242 points (2) Silvan Zurbriggen (Switzerland) 231 (3) Baumann 169

===== Biathlon =====
- World Championships in Pyeongchang, South Korea:
  - Women's 12.5 km Mass Start: (1) Olga Zaitseva (Russia) 34:18.3 (2) (2) Anastasiya Kuzmina (Slovakia) at 7.5 sec (2) (3) Helena Jonsson (Sweden) 12.3 (2)
    - Overall World Cup standings (after 18 out of 26 races): (1) Kati Wilhelm (Germany) 729 points (2) Jonsson 703 (3) Magdalena Neuner (Germany) 626
  - Men's 4 x 7.5 km Relay: (1) Norway (Emil Hegle Svendsen, Lars Berger, Halvard Hanevold, Ole Einar Bjørndalen) 1:08:04.1 (11) (2) Austria (Daniel Mesotitsch, Simon Eder, Dominik Landertinger, Christoph Sumann) 1:08:16.7 (7) (3) Germany (Michael Rösch, Christoph Stephan, Arnd Peiffer, Michael Greis) 1:08:36.8 (10)
    - Bjørndalen wins his fourth title of the championships.
    - World Cup Relay standings (after 5 of 6 races): (1) Austria 276 points (2) Norway 249 (3) Germany 231

===== Bobsleigh =====
- World Championships at Lake Placid, New York, United States:
  - Two-man: (1) Switzerland (Ivo Rüegg, Cedric Grand) 3:42.20 (2) Germany (Thomas Florschütz, Marc Kühne) +0.22 (3) USA (Steven Holcomb, Curtis Tomasevicz) +0.40

===== Bobsleigh and Skeleton =====
- World Championships at Lake Placid, New York, United States:
  - Team: (1) Germany (Frank Rommel, Sandra Kiriasis, Patricia Polifka, Marion Trott, Thomas Florschütz & Andreas Barucha) 3:45.41 (2) Switzerland (Gregor Stähli, Sabrina Hafner, Anne Dietrich, Maya Pedersen, Ivo Rüegg & Cedric Grand) +0.24 (3) USA (Eric Bernotas, Shauna Rohbock, Valerie Fleming, Katie Uhlaender, Steven Holcomb & Justin Olsen) +0.25

===== Cross-country skiing =====
- Nordic World Ski Championships in Liberec, Czech Republic:
  - 30 km Pursuit men: (1) Petter Northug (Norway) 1hour 15:52.4 (2) Anders Södergren (Sweden) at 3.1sec (3) Giorgio Di Centa (Italy) 11.9

===== Nordic combined =====
- Nordic World Ski Championships in Liberec, Czech Republic:
  - Gundersen HS100/10.0 km men: (1) Todd Lodwick (United States) 24mins 22.3 (1) (2) Jan Schmid (Norway) at 13.0 (2) (3) Bill Demong (United States) 33.5 (12)
    - Lodwick wins his second title of the championships.

===== Snowboarding =====
- World Cup in Stoneham, Canada:
  - Parallel GS men: (1) Benjamin Karl (Austria) (2) Siegfried Grabner (Austria) (3) Andreas Prommegger (Austria)
  - Parallel GS women: (1) Amelie Kober (Germany) (2) Tomoka Takeuchi (Japan) (3) Doris Günther (Austria)

=== 21 February 2009 (Saturday) ===
==== Auto racing ====
- Nationwide Series:
  - Stater Brothers 300 in Fontana, California
    - (1) Kyle Busch (Nevada) (2) Kevin Harvick (California) (3) Joey Logano (Connecticut)
      - Busch, who won the San Bernardino County 200 in the Truck Series earlier today, becomes the first driver in NASCAR history to win races in two national touring series on the same day.

==== Basketball ====
- 21 Feb:
  - Russian Cup Final:
    - Dynamo Moscow 60–81 **UNICS Kazan**

==== Cricket ====
- Sri Lanka in Pakistan:
  - 1st Test in Karachi, day 1:
    - Sri Lanka 406/3 (Mahela Jayawardene 136 *, Thilan Samaraweera 130*)

==== Tennis ====
- WTA Tour:
  - Dubai Tennis Championships in Dubai, United Arab Emirates:
    - Final: (United States) **Venus Williams** beat (France) Virginie Razzano 6–4, 6–2
      - Venus Williams wins the 40th title of her career.
  - Regions Morgan Keegan Championships and the Cellular South Cup in Memphis, Tennessee, United States:
    - Final: (Belarus) **Victoria Azarenka** beat (Denmark) Caroline Wozniacki 6–3, 6–1

==== Winter sports ====
===== Alpine skiing =====
- Women's World Cup in Tarvisio, Italy:
  - downhill: (1) Gina Stechert (Germany) 1:59.94 (2) Lindsey Vonn (USA) 1:59.95 (3) Anja Pärson (Sweden) 2:00.33
    - Overall World Cup standings (after 24 of 34 races): (1) Vonn 1274 points (2) Maria Riesch (Germany) 1061 (3) Pärson 960
- Men's World Cup in Sestriere, Italy:
  - Giant slalom: (1) Didier Cuche (Switzerland) 2:49.57 (1:22.76 + 1:26.81) (2) Stephan Goergl (Austria) 2:50.23 (1:24.04 + 1:26.19) (3) Benjamin Raich (Austria) 2:50.46 (1:23.73 + 1:26.73)
    - Overall World Cup standings (after 28 of 38 races): (1) Ivica Kostelic (Croatia) 766 points (2) Benjamin Raich (Austria) 740 (3) Jean-Baptiste Grange (France) 726

===== Biathlon =====
- World Championships in Pyeongchang, South Korea:
  - Men's 15 km Mass start: (1) Dominik Landertinger (Austria) 38min 32.5sec (3) (2) Christoph Sumann (Austria) at 8.9 (3) (3) Ivan Tcherezov (Russia) 13.9 (2)
    - Overall World Cup standings (after 18 of 26 events): (1) Tomasz Sikora (Poland) 696 points (2) Ole Einar Bjørndalen (Norway) 673 (3) Maxim Tchoudov (Russia) 609
  - Women's 4 x 6 km Relay: (1) Russia (Svetlana Sleptsova, Anna Boulygina, Olga Medvedtseva, Olga Zaitseva) 1hr 13min 12.9sec (0) (2) Germany (Martina Beck, Magdalena Neuner, Andrea Henkel, Kati Wilhelm) at 1:15.1 (3) (3) France (Marie-Laure Brunet, Sylvie Becaert, Marie Dorin, Sandrine Bailly) 1:27.5 (1)
    - World Cup Relay standings (after 5 of 6 events): (1) Germany 276 points (2) France 242 (3) Sweden 208

===== Bobsleigh =====
- World Championships at Lake Placid, New York, United States:
  - Two-woman: (1) United Kingdom (Nicole Minichiello, Gillian Cooke) 3:48.22 (2) USA (Shauna Rohbock, Elana Meyers) +0.38 (3) Germany (Cathleen Martini, Janine Tischer) +0.62

===== Cross-country skiing =====
- Nordic World Ski Championships in Liberec, Czech Republic:
  - 15 km Pursuit women: (1) Justyna Kowalczyk (Poland) 40:55.3 (2) Kristin Stoermer Steira (Norway) at 1.7 (3) Aino-Kaisa Saarinen (Finland) 8.0

===== Luge =====
- World Cup 9 in Whistler, British Columbia, Canada:
  - Men: (1) David Möller (Germany) 1:33.919 (2) Armin Zöggeler (Italy) 1:33.938 (3) Felix Loch (Germany) 1:34.028
    - Final World Cup standings: (1) Zöggeler 786 points (2) Möller 659 (3) Jan Eichhorn (Germany) 506

===== Ski jumping =====
- Nordic World Ski Championships in Liberec, Czech Republic:
  - HS100 men: (1) Wolfgang Loitzl (Austria) 282.0 points (103.5/99.0m) (2) Gregor Schlierenzauer (Austria) 275.0 (102.0/99.0) (3) Simon Ammann (Switzerland) 274.5 (102.0/99.5)

===== Snowboarding =====
- World Cup in Stoneham, Canada:
  - Big air men: (1) Stefan Gimpl (Austria) (2) Marko Grilc (Slovenia) (3) Seppe Smits (Belgium)

=== 20 February 2009 (Friday) ===
==== Winter sports ====
===== Alpine skiing =====
- Women's World Cup in Tarvisio, Italy:
  - Super combined: (1) Maria Riesch (Germany) 2:18.57 (1:31.98 + 46.59) (2) Lindsey Vonn (United States) 2:19.06 (1:31.22 + 47.84) (3) Kathrin Zettel (Austria) 2:20.60 (1:33.57 + 47.03)
    - World Cup overall standings (after 23 from 34 races): (1) Vonn 1194 points (2) Riesch 1035 (3) Anja Pärson (Sweden) 900
    - Final super-combined standings: (1) Pärson 205 points (2) Vonn 180 (3) Zettel 162

===== Cross-country skiing =====
- Nordic World Ski Championships in Liberec, Czech Republic:
  - 15 km Classic men: (1) Andrus Veerpalu (Estonia) 38min 54.4sec (2) Lukáš Bauer (Czech Republic) at 6.3s (3) Matti Heikkinen (Finland) 16.4

===== Freestyle skiing =====
- World Cup in Myrkdalen–Voss, Norway:
  - Moguls men: (1) Alexandre Bilodeau (Canada) 26.63 (2) Tapio Luusua (Finland) 25.99 (3) Michael Morse (United States) 25.86
  - Moguls women: (1) Aiko Uemura (Japan) 27.12 (2) Nikola Sudova (Czech Republic) 25.37 (3) Miki Ito (Japan) 24.78

===== Luge =====
- World Cup 9 in Whistler, British Columbia, Canada:
  - Women: (1) Natalie Geisenberger (Germany) 1:38.012 (49.020+48.992) (2) Tatjana Hüfner (Germany) 1:38.369 (49.122+49.247) (3) Anke Wischnewski (Germany) 1:38.612 (49.338+49.274)
    - Final World Cup standings: (1) Hüfner 855 points (2) Geisenberger 785 (3) Wischnewski 592
  - Doubles: (1) André Florschütz/Torsten Wustlich (Germany) 1:37.584 (2) Patric Leitner/Alexander Resch (Germany) 1:37.624 (3) Andreas Linger/Wolfgang Linger (Austria) 1:37.731
    - Final World Cup standings: (1) Christian Oberstolz/Patrick Gruber (Italy) 735 points (2) Leitner/Resch 629 (3) Linger/Linger 590

===== Nordic combined =====
- Nordic World Ski Championships in Liberec, Czech Republic:
  - Mass Start HS100/10.0 km men: (1) Todd Lodwick (United States) 276.0 points (1) (2) Tino Edelmann (Germany) 273.7 (2) (3) Jason Lamy Chappuis (France) 265.2 (20)

===== Ski jumping =====
- Nordic World Ski Championships in Liberec, Czech Republic:
  - HS100 women: (1) Lindsey Van (United States) 243.0 points (89.0/97.5m) (2) Ulrike Graessler (Germany) 239.0 (93.5/93.0) (3) Anette Sagen (Norway) 238.5 (93.5/94.0)

===== Snowboarding =====
- World Cup in Stoneham, Canada:
  - Halfpipe men: (1) Jeff Batchelor (Canada) (2) Brad Martin (Canada) (3) Markus Malin (Finland)
  - Halfpipe women: (1) Soko Yamaoka (Japan) (2) Shiho Makashima (Japan) (3) Rana Okada (Japan)

=== 19 February 2009 (Thursday) ===
==== Basketball ====
- Israeli State Cup Final in Tel Aviv:
  - **Hapoel Holon** 69–68 Maccabi Haifa
    - Brian Tolbert scores a three-pointer as time expires to give Holon its first Cup in history.

==== Cricket ====
- England in West Indies:
  - 3rd Test in St John's, Antigua, day 5:
    - England 566/9d and 221/8d; West Indies 285 and 370/9 (Ramnaresh Sarwan 106). **Match drawn, West Indies lead 5-match series 1–0**.

==== Football (soccer) ====
- UEFA Cup round of 32, first leg:
  - Lech Poznań (Poland) 2–2 (Italy) Udinese
  - Shakhtar Donetsk (Ukraine) 2–0 (England) Tottenham Hotspur
  - Copenhagen (Denmark) 2–2 (England) Manchester City
  - Marseille (France) 0–1 (Netherlands) Twente
  - Fiorentina (Italy) 0–1 (Netherlands) Ajax
- Copa Libertadores group stage:
  - Group 5:
    - Cruzeiro (Brazil) 3–0 (Argentina) Estudiantes
  - Group 8:
    - Universitario (Peru) 1–0 (Argentina) San Lorenzo

==== Golf ====
- Tiger Woods announces that his first event since knee surgery after the 2008 U.S. Open will be next week's Accenture Match Play Championship. (ESPN)

==== Winter sports ====
===== Biathlon =====
- World Championships in Pyeongchang, South Korea:
  - Mixed Relay: (1) France (Marie-Laure Brunet, Sylvie Becaert, Vincent Defrasne, Simon Fourcade) 1:10:30.0 (6) (2) Sweden (Helena Jonsson, Anna Carin Olofsson, David Ekholm, Carl Johan Bergman) at 1:10:36.2 (3) (3) Germany (Andrea Henkel, Simone Hauswald, Arnd Peiffer, Michael Greis) 1:10:39.0 (11)

===== Cross-country skiing =====
- Nordic World Ski Championships in Liberec, Czech Republic:
  - 10 km Classic women: (1) Aino-Kaisa Saarinen (Finland) 28mins 12.8secs (2) Marianna Longa (Italy) at 4.2 (3) Justyna Kowalczyk (Poland) 11.5

===== Freestyle skiing =====
- World Cup in Myrkdalen–Voss, Norway:
  - Skicross men: (1) Tomas Kraus (Czech Republic) (2) Thomas Zangerl (Austria) (3) Andreas Matt (Austria)
  - Skicross women: (1) Ophelie David (France) (2) Katharina Gutensohn (Austria) (3) Karin Huttary (Austria)

===== Nordic combined =====
- Nordic World Ski Championships in Liberec, Czech Republic:
  - Mass Start HS100/10.0 km men: Ski jumping postponed to Friday

===== Snowboarding =====
- World Cup in Stoneham, Canada:
  - Snowboardcross men: (1) Markus Schairer (Austria) (2) Jonathan Cheever (United States) (3) Seth Wescott (United States)
  - Snowboardcross women: (1) Lindsey Jacobellis (United States) (2) Mellie Francon (Switzerland) (3) Maëlle Ricker (Canada)

=== 18 February 2009 (Wednesday) ===
==== Cricket ====
- England in West Indies:
  - 3rd Test in St John's, Antigua, day 4:
    - England 566/9d and 221/8d; West Indies 285 and 143/3. West Indies require another 360 runs with 7 wickets remaining.

==== Football (soccer) ====
- UEFA Cup round of 32, first leg:
  - Olympiacos (Greece) 1–3 (France) Saint-Étienne
  - Zenit St. Petersburg (Russia) 2–1 (Germany) Stuttgart
  - Dynamo Kyiv (Ukraine) 1–1 (Spain) Valencia
  - Aston Villa (England) 1–1 (Russia) CSKA Moscow
  - Werder Bremen (Germany) 1–1 (Italy) Milan
  - Sampdoria (Italy) 0–1 (Ukraine) Metalist Kharkiv
  - N.E.C. Nijmegen (Netherlands) 0–3 (Germany) Hamburg
  - Paris Saint-Germain (France) 2–0 (Germany) Wolfsburg
  - Bordeaux (France) 0–0 (Turkey) Galatasaray
  - Aalborg BK (Denmark) 3–0 (Spain) Deportivo
  - Braga (Portugal) 3–0 (Belgium) Standard Liège
- Copa Libertadores group stage:
  - Group 1:
    - Colo-Colo (Chile) 1–2 (Brazil) Sport Recife
  - Group 3:
    - Nacional (Paraguay) 0–3 (Uruguay) Nacional
  - Group 4:
    - São Paulo (Brazil) 1–1 (Colombia) Independiente Medellín

==== Winter sports ====
===== Biathlon =====
- World Championships in Pyeongchang, South Korea:
  - Women's 15 km Individual: (1) Kati Wilhelm (Germany) 44:03.1 (1) (2) Teja Gregorin (Slovenia) at 39.5 sec (1) (3) Tora Berger (Norway) 46.5 (1)
    - Wilhelm wins her second title and third medal of the championships.
    - Overall World Cup standings after 17 out of 26 races: (1) Wilhelm 718 points (2) Helena Jonsson (Sweden) 655 (3) Magdalena Neuner (Germany) 590

=== 17 February 2009 (Tuesday) ===
==== Cricket ====
- England in West Indies:
  - 3rd Test in St John's, Antigua, day 3:
    - England 566/9d and 31/1; West Indies 285. England led by 312 runs with 9 wickets remaining.

==== Football (soccer) ====
- Copa Libertadores group stage:
  - Group 1:
    - LDU Quito (Ecuador) 3–2 (Brazil) Palmeiras
  - Group 2:
    - Boca Juniors (Argentina) 1–0 (Ecuador) Deportivo Cuenca
  - Group 6:
    - Everton (Chile) 1–0 (Venezuela) Caracas

==== Winter sports ====
===== Biathlon =====
- World Championships in Pyeongchang, South Korea:
  - Men's 20 km Individual: (1) Ole Einar Bjørndalen (Norway) 52:28.0 (0+0+2+1) (2) Christoph Stephan (Germany) 52:42.1 (1+0+0+0) (3) Jakov Fak (Croatia) 52:45.1 (0+0+0+1)
    - Bjørndalen wins his third title of the championships, the 13th World Championship title of his career, and also wins his 87th World Cup race, and breaks the record held by Ingemar Stenmark.
    - World Cup overall standings after 17 out of 26 competitions: (1) Tomasz Sikora (Poland) 658 points (2) Bjørndalen 630 (3) Maxim Tchoudov (Russia) 573

=== 16 February 2009 (Monday) ===
==== Cricket ====
- England in West Indies:
  - 3rd Test in St John's, Antigua, day 2:
    - England 566/9d (Andrew Strauss 169, Paul Collingwood 113); West Indies 55/1. West Indies trail by 511 runs with 9 wickets remaining in the first innings.

==== Golf ====
- PGA Tour:
  - AT&T Pebble Beach National Pro-Am in Pebble Beach, California
    - Winner: Dustin Johnson (United States) 201 (−15). Tournament suspended after 54 holes due to unplayable course conditions.

=== 15 February 2009 (Sunday) ===
==== Auto racing ====
- Sprint Cup Series:
  - Daytona 500 in Daytona Beach, Florida:
    - (1) Matt Kenseth (Wisconsin) (2) Kevin Harvick (California) (3) A. J. Allmendinger (California)
      - Race cut to 380 miles (610 km) due to rain.
- World Rally Championship:
  - Rally Norway:
    - (1) Sébastien Loeb (France) Citroën C4 3:28:15.9 (2) Mikko Hirvonen (Finland) Ford Focus 3:28:25.7 (3) Jari Matti Latvala (Finland) Ford Focus 3:29:37.7
      - Drivers overall standings: (1) Loeb 20 pts (2) Hirvonen 14 (3) Dani Sordo (Spain) 12

==== Basketball ====
- NBA All-Star Game in Phoenix, Arizona:
  - West 146, East 119.
    - The MVP Award is shared by Los Angeles Lakers' Kobe Bryant and Phoenix Suns' Shaquille O'Neal, each winning the award for the third time.

==== Cricket ====
- England in West Indies:
  - 3rd Test in St John's, Antigua, day 1:
    - England 301/3 (Andrew Strauss 169)
- New Zealand in Australia:
  - Only T20I in Sydney:
    - Australia 150/7 (20/20 ov); New Zealand 149/5 (20/20 ov). **Australia win by 1 run**.

==== Golf ====
- PGA Tour:
  - AT&T Pebble Beach National Pro-Am in Pebble Beach, California
    - Final round postponed until Monday due to severe weather.
- European Tour:
  - Malaysian Open in Kuala Lumpur, Malaysia:
    - Winner: Anthony Kang (United States) 271 (−17)

==== Rugby union ====
- Six Nations Championship, week 2:
  - Italy 9–38 Ireland in Rome
    - Ireland top the table on 4 points from 2 matches, ahead of Wales on scoring differential.
- Sevens World Series:
  - USA Sevens in San Diego:
    - Final: England 14–19 Argentina
      - Standings after 4 of 8 events: (1) South Africa & England 60 pts (3) New Zealand 52

==== Tennis ====
- ATP Tour:
  - SAP Open in San Jose, California, United States:
    - Final: (Czech Republic) **Radek Štěpánek** def. (United States) Mardy Fish 3–6, 6–4, 6–2
  - ABN AMRO World Tennis Tournament in Rotterdam, Netherlands:
    - Final: (United Kingdom) **Andy Murray** def. (Spain) Rafael Nadal 6–3, 4–6, 6–0
- WTA Tour:
  - Open Gaz de France in Paris, France:
    - Final: (France) **Amélie Mauresmo** def. (Russia) Elena Dementieva 7–6(7), 2–6, 6–4
  - Pattaya Women's Open in Pattaya, Thailand:
    - Final: (Russia) **Vera Zvonareva** def. (India) Sania Mirza 7–5, 6–1

==== Winter sports ====
===== Alpine skiing =====
- World Championships in Val-d'Isère, France:
  - Men's slalom: (1) Manfred Pranger (Austria) 1:44.17 (52.49 + 51.68) (2) Julien Lizeroux (France) 1:44.48 (52.98 + 51.50) (3) Michael Janyk (Canada) 1:45.70 (54.37 + 51.33)

===== Biathlon =====
- World Championships in Pyeongchang, South Korea:
  - Women's 10 km Pursuit: (1) Helena Jonsson (Sweden) 34:12.3 (2) (2) Kati Wilhelm (Germany) at 18.3sec (6) (3) Olga Zaitseva (Russia) 24.1 (6)
    - Overall World Cup standings (after 16 out of 26 races): (1) Wilhelm 658 points (2) Jonsson 621 (3) Magdalena Neuner (Germany) 590
  - Men's 12.5 km Pursuit: (1) Ole Einar Bjørndalen (Norway) 31:46.7 (4) (2) Maxim Tchoudov (Russia) at 41.7 sec (3) (3) Alexander Os (Norway) 52.8 (3)
    - Bjørndalen wins his second gold medal of the championship and a record twelfth World Championship title.
    - Overall World Cup standings (after 16 out of 26 races): (1) Tomasz Sikora (Poland) 626 points (2) Bjørndalen 570 (3) Emil Hegle Svendsen (Norway) 570

===== Nordic combined =====
- World Cup in Klingenthal, Germany:
  - 10 km Gundersen: (1) Bill Demong (United States) 27mins 04.4secs (7) (2) Jason Lamy-Chappuis (France) at 0.6 (2) (3) Pavel Churavy (Czech Republic) 1.7 (1)
    - Overall World Cup rankings (after 19 of the 23 races): (1) Anssi Koivuranta (Finland) 1169 points (2) Magnus Moan (Norway) 1120 (3) Bjoern Kircheisen (Germany) 840

===== Short track speed skating =====
- World Cup 6 in Dresden, Germany

===== Ski jumping =====
- World Cup in Oberstdorf, Germany:
  - 213m flying hill team: (1) Finland 1413.8 (Kalle Keituri/Juha-Matti Ruuskanen/Matti Hautamäki/Harri Olli) (2) Russia 1378.3 (Denis Kornilov/Pavel Karelin/Ilja Rosliakov/Dimitry Vassiliev) (3) Austria 1354.3 (Wolfgang Loitzl/Markus Eggenhofer/Andreas Kofler/Martin Koch)

===== Snowboarding =====
- World Cup in Cypress Mountain, Canada:
  - Parallel GS men: Cencelled
  - Parallel GS women: Cancelled

===== Speed skating =====
- World Cup 8 in Heerenveen, Netherlands:
  - Men 1500 m: (1) Shani Davis (United States) 1:45.40 (2) Enrico Fabris (Italy) 1:45.88 (3) Trevor Marsicano (United States) 1:46.09
  - Men 10000 m: (1) Sven Kramer (Netherlands) 13:03.51 (2) Håvard Bøkko (Norway) 13:07.93 (3) Bob de Jong (Netherlands) 13:09.16
  - Women 5000 m: (1) Martina Sáblíková (Czech Republic) 6:59.08 (2) Stephanie Beckert (Germany) 7:01.33 (3) Kristina Groves (Canada) 7:05.08
  - Women 1500 m: (1) Anni Friesinger (Germany) 1:57.48 (2) Christine Nesbitt (Canada) 1:57.58 (3) Kristina Groves (Canada) 1:58.40

=== 14 February 2009 (Saturday) ===
==== Auto racing ====
- Nationwide Series:
  - Camping World 300 in Daytona Beach, Florida
    - (1) Tony Stewart (Indiana)

==== Basketball ====
- NBA All-Star Saturday Night
  - Slam Dunk Contest: Nate Robinson of the New York Knicks reclaims the championship after beating defending champion Orlando Magic's Dwight Howard garnering 52% of the fan vote. Robinson's dunk include jumping over Howard's shoulder, while Howard dunked on an 11-foot basket.
  - Three-Point Shootout: Daequan Cook of the Miami Heat forced overtime and won on the extra shootout against Rashard Lewis of the Orlando Magic. Cook converted his last 4 shots to tie Lewis; in the extra shootout, Lewis got cold as he tallied only 7 points against Cook's 19.
  - Skills Challenge: Chicago Bull Derrick Rose dunked on the final stunt to clinch the Skills Challenge championship over Devin Harris of the New Jersey Nets.
  - Shooting Stars Competition: Team Detroit won over Team Phoenix

==== Golf ====
- LPGA Tour:
  - SBS Open at Turtle Bay in Kahuku, Hawaiʻi
    - Winner: Angela Stanford (United States) 206 (−10)

==== Rugby union ====
- Six Nations Championship, week 2:
  - France 22–13 Scotland in Paris
  - Wales 23–15 England in Cardiff
    - Wales lead the standings with 4 points from 2 matches.

==== Tennis ====
- ATP Tour:
  - Brasil Open in Costa do Sauípe, Brazil
    - Final: (Spain) **Tommy Robredo** beat (Brazil) Thomaz Bellucci 6–3, 3–6, 6–4

==== Winter sports ====
===== Alpine skiing =====
- World Championships in Val-d'Isère, France:
  - Women's slalom: (1) Maria Riesch (Germany) 1:51.80 (55.63 + 56.17) (2) Šárka Záhrobská (Czech Republic) 1:52.57 (55.47 + 57.10) (3) Tanja Poutiainen (Finland) 1:52.89 (55.91 + 56.98)

===== Biathlon =====
- World Championships in Pyeongchang, South Korea:
  - Women's 7.5 km sprint: (1) Kati Wilhelm (Germany) 21:11.1 (0 penalty) (2) Simone Hauswald (Germany) at 9.9 (0) (3) Olga Zaitseva (Russia) 27.1 (0)
    - Overall World Cup standings after 15 out of 26 races: (1) Wilhelm 604 points (2) Helena Jonsson (Sweden) 561 (3) Magdalena Neuner (Germany) 560
  - Men's 10 km sprint: (1) Ole Einar Bjørndalen (Norway) 24:16.5 (2 penalties) (2) Lars Berger (Norway) at 1.2 (2) (3) Halvard Hanevold (Norway) 12.5 (0)
    - World Cup overall standings after 15 out of 26 races: (1) Tomasz Sikora (Poland) 583 points (2) Emil Hegle Svendsen (Norway) 570 (3) Bjørndalen 510

===== Bobsleigh =====
- World Cup 8 in Park City, Utah, United States:
  - Four-man: (1) Steven Holcomb/Justin Olsen/Steve Mesler/Curtis Tomasevicz (United States) 1:34.80 (2) Janis Minins/Daumants Dreiskens/Oskars Melbardis/Intars Dambis (Latvia) 1:35.35 (3) Alexandr Zubkov/Roman Oreshnikov/Dmitry Trunenkov/Dmitriy Stepushkin (Russia) 1:35.57
    - Final World Cup standings: (1) Zubkov 1646 (2) Minins 1549 (3) Andre Lange (Germany) 1251

===== Cross-country skiing =====
- World Cup in Valdidentro, Italy:
  - Men's 15 km classic: (1) Anders Södergren (Sweden) 37:58.0 (2) Jens Arne Svartedal (Norway) at 1.9 (3) Johan Olsson (Sweden) 2.2
    - Overall World Cup standings (after 23 of 32 races): (1) Dario Cologna (Switzerland) 939 points (2) Petter Northug (Norway) 736 (3) Axel Teichmann (GER) 663
  - Women's 10 km classic: (1) Justyna Kowalczyk (Poland) 29:37.4 (2) Marianna Longa (Italy) at 12.4 (3) Petra Majdič (Slovenia) 30.3
    - Overall World Cup standings (after 22 of 32 races): (1) Aino-Kaisa Saarinen (Finland) 1276 points (2) Majdic 1250 (3) Kowalczyk 1167

===== Freestyle skiing =====
- World Cup in Åre, Sweden:
  - Dual Moguls men: (1) Alexandre Bilodeau (Canada) (2) Guilbaut Colas (France) (3) Maxime Gingras (Canada)
  - Dual Moguls women: (1) Hannah Kearney (United States) (2) Aiko Uemura (Japan) (3) Margarita Marbler (Austria)
- World Cup in Moscow, Russia:
  - Aerials men: (1) Ryan St Onge (United States) 249.94 (2) Dmitri Dashinski (Belarus) 247.86 (3) Stanislav Kravchuk (Ukraine) 243.64
  - Aerials women: (1) Xu Mengtao (China) 195.98 (2) Cheng Shuang (China) 192.81 (3) Lydia Lassila (Australia) 192.11

===== Luge =====
- World Cup 8 in Calgary, Canada
  - Men: (1) Armin Zöggeler (Italy) 1:30.375 (2) Felix Loch (Germany) 1:30.690 (3) Albert Demtschenko (Russia) 1:30.796
    - World Cup standings (after 8 of 9 races): (1) Zöggeler 701 points (2) David Möller (Germany) 559 (3) Jan Eichhorn (Germany) 460
      - Zöggeler secures his eighth World Cup title.
  - Doubles: (1) Christian Oberstolz/Patrick Gruber (Italy) (2) Peter Penz/Georg Fischler (Austria) (3) Gerhard Plankensteiner/Oswald Haselrieder (Italy)
    - World Cup standings (after 8 of 9 races): (1) Oberstolz/Gruber 680 points (2) Patric Leitner/Alexander Resch (Germany) 544 (3) Andreas Linger/Wolfgang Linger (Austria) 520
      - Oberstolz/Gruber secure their second World Cup title.

===== Nordic combined =====
- World Cup in Klingenthal, Germany:
  - 10 km Gundersen: (1) Anssi Koivuranta (Finland) 27:16.7 (2) Magnus Moan (Norway) 27:32.1 (3) Jan Schmid (Norway) 28:20.8
    - World Cup standings (after 18 of 23 events): (1) Koivuranta 1133 points (2) Moan 1070 (3) Björn Kircheisen (Germany) 840

===== Ski jumping =====
- World Cup in Oberstdorf, Germany:
  - 213m flying hill: (1) Harri Olli (Finland) 435.8 pts (225.5/216.0 m), (2) Anders Jacobsen (Norway) 428.6 (218.0/212.5), (3) Johan Remen Evensen (Norway) 426.5 (211.5/223.5)
    - Overall World Cup standings (after 21 of 27 rounds): (1) Gregor Schlierenzauer (Austria) 1652 points, (2) Simon Ammann (Switzerland) 1418, (3) Wolfgang Loitzl (Austria) 1252

===== Snowboarding =====
- World Cup in Cypress Mountain, Canada:
  - Halfpipe men: (1) Shaun White (United States) (2) Ryoh Aono (Japan) (3) Iouri Podladtchikov (Switzerland)
  - Halfpipe women: (1) Kelly Clark (United States) (2) Liu Jiayu (China) (3) Hannah Teter (United States)

=== 13 February 2009 (Friday) ===
==== Baseball ====
- The City Commission of Miami, Florida, defeats a construction agreement that would have permitted the construction of Marlins Park, a new baseball stadium for the Florida Marlins, by a vote of 2–2 with one absence. The deal will be renegotiated and is rescheduled for a new meeting on 12 March.

==== Basketball ====
- NBA All-Star Weekend:
  - Rookie Challenge: Sophomores 122, Rookies 116. Kevin Durant of the Oklahoma City Thunder won the MVP honors with a Rookie Challenge scoring record of 46 points.

==== Cricket ====
- England in West Indies:
  - 2nd Test in North Sound, Antigua, day 1:
    - England 7/0; West Indies. **Match drawn, West Indies lead 5-match series 1–0**.
      - The match is abandoned after only ten balls being bowled due to overly sandy outfield that made bowling impossible. The series will be extended to five matches and resume on Sunday, at the nearby Antigua Recreation Ground.
- New Zealand in Australia:
  - 5th ODI in Brisbane:
    - Australia 168/4 (22/22 ov); New Zealand 123/6 (14/20 ov). **No result, 5-match series tied 2–2**.

==== Winter sports ====
===== Alpine skiing =====
- World Championships in Val-d'Isère, France:
  - Men's giant slalom: (1) Carlo Janka (Switzerland) 2:18.82 (1:08.25 + 1:10.57) (2) Benjamin Raich (Austria) 2:19.53 (1:08.73 + 1:10.80) (3) Ted Ligety (United States) 2:19.81 (1:09.96 + 1:09.85)

===== Bobsleigh =====
- World Cup 8 in Park City, Utah, United States:
  - Four-man: (1) Steven Holcomb/Justin Olsen/Steve Mesler/Curtis Tomasevicz (United States) 1:34.34 (47.03/47.31) (2) Janis Minins/Daumants Dreiškens/Oskars Melbardis/Intars Dambis (Latvia) 1:34.57 (47.28/47.29) (3) Alexandr Zubkov/Roman Oreshnikov/Dmitry Trunenkov/Dmitriy Stepushkin (Russia) 1:34.68 (47.26/47.42)
    - World Cup standings (after 7 of 8 races): (1) Zoubkov 1446 pts (2) Miņins 1339 (3) Wolfgang Stampfer (Austria) 1136
  - Two-woman: (1) Cathleen Martini/Janine Tischer (Germany) 1:38.66 (49.28/49.38) (2) Kaillie Humphries/Shelley-Ann Brown (Canada) 1:38.84 (49.30/49.54) (3) Sandra Kiriasis/Patricia Polifka (Germany) 1:39.34 (49.67/49.67)
    - Final World Cup standings: (1) Kiriasis 1679 pts (2) Martini 1599 (3) Nicole Minichiello (United Kingdom) 1434
      - Kiriasis wins her sixth straight World Cup title.

===== Cross-country skiing =====
- World Cup in Valdidentro, Italy:
  - Men's sprint freestyle: (1) Ola Vigen Hattestad (Norway) (2) Alexei Petukhov (Russia) (3) Emil Joensson (Sweden)
    - Overall World Cup standings (after 22 of 32 events): (1) Dario Cologna (Switzerland) 926 points (2) Petter Northug (Norway) 720 (3) Axel Teichmann (Germany) 649
  - Women's sprint freestyle: (1) Petra Majdič (Slovenia) (2) Pirjo Muranen (Finland) (3) Magda Genuin (Italy)
    - Overall World Cup standings (after 22 of 32 events): (1) Aino-Kaisa Saarinen (Finland) 1240 points (2) Majdic 1190 (3) Virpi Kuitunen (Finland) 1069

===== Freestyle skiing =====
- World Cup in Åre, Sweden:
  - Moguls men: (1) Alexandre Bilodeau (Canada) 26.11 (2) Pierre-Alexandre Rousseau (Canada) 25.96 (3) Vincent Marquiz (Canada) 25.44
  - Moguls women: (1) Margarita Marbler (Austria) 24.89 (2) Jennifer Heil (Canada) 24.74 (3) Aiko Uemura (Japan) 24.66

===== Luge =====
- World Cup 8 in Calgary, Canada
  - Women: (1) Tatjana Hüfner (Germany) (2) Natalie Geisenberger (Germany) (3) Veronika Halder (Austria)
    - World Cup standings (after 8 of 9 races): (1) Hüfner 770 points (2) Geisenberger 685 (3) Anke Wischnewski (Germany) 522

===== Snowboarding =====
- World Cup in Cypress Mountain, Canada:
  - Snowboardcross men: (1) Markus Schairer (Austria) (2) Mike Robertson (Canada) (3) Seth Wescott (United States)
  - Snowboardcross women: (1) Lindsey Jacobellis (United States) (2) Olivia Nobs (Switzerland) (3) Helene Olafsen (Norway)

=== 12 February 2009 (Thursday) ===
==== Auto racing ====
- Sprint Cup Series:
  - Gatorade Duel in Daytona Beach, Florida
    - Winners: Jeff Gordon (California) & Kyle Busch (Nevada)

==== Basketball ====
- Euroleague Top 16, week 3:
  - Group F:
    - Regal FC Barcelona (Spain) 85–69 (Germany) ALBA Berlin
    - Real Madrid (Spain) 98–79 (Israel) Maccabi Tel Aviv
  - Group G:
    - Panathinaikos (Greece) 92–67 (Italy) Lottomatica Roma
  - Group H:
    - Cibona Zagreb (Croatia) 55–65 (Turkey) Fenerbahçe Ülker
      - Real Madrid and Panathinaikos are unbeaten after 3 games.

==== Football (soccer) ====
- Copa Libertadores group stage:
  - Group 3:
    - Nacional (Uruguay) 2–1 (Peru) U. San Martín
    - River Plate (Argentina) 1–0 (Paraguay) Nacional
  - Group 5:
    - Universitario de Sucre (Bolivia) 1–1 (Ecuador) Deportivo Quito

==== Winter sports ====
===== Alpine skiing =====
- World Championships in Val-d'Isère, France:
  - Women's giant slalom: (1) Kathrin Hölzl (Germany) 2:03.49 (2) Tina Maze (Slovenia) 2:03.58 (3) Tanja Poutiainen (Finland) 2:04.03

===== Bobsleigh =====
- World Cup 7 in Park City, Utah, United States:
  - Two-man: (1) Alexandre Zoubkov/Alexey Voevoda (Russia) 1:36.51 (48.26/48.25) (2) Thomas Florschütz/Marc Kühne (Germany) 1:36.68 (48.44/48.24) (3) Beat Hefti/Thomas Lamparter (Switzerland) 1:36.69 (48.30/48.39)
    - World Cup standings (after 7 of 8 events): (1) Hefti 1581 pts (2) André Lange (Germany) 1501 (3) Florschuetz 1453

===== Skeleton =====
- World Cup 8 in Park City, Utah, United States:
  - Men: (1) Aleksandr Tretyakov (Russia) 1:39.33 (49.66/49.67) (2) Florian Grassl (Germany) 1:39.40 (49.83/49.57) (3) Frank Rommel (Germany) 1:39.56 (49.73/49.83)
    - Final World Cup standings: (1) Tretyakov 1526 pts (2) Grassl 1453 (3) Rommel 1436
  - Women: (1) Marion Trott (Germany) 1:41.28 (50.51/50.77) (2) Katie Uhlaender (United States) 1:41.59 (50.69/50.90) (3) Mellisa Hollingsworth (Canada) 1:41.62 (50.89/50.73)
    - Final World Cup standings: (1) Trott 1572 pts (2) Shelley Rudman (United Kingdom) 1468 (3) Uhlaender 1466

=== 11 February 2009 (Wednesday) ===
==== American football ====
- NFL news:
  - Three-time MVP Brett Favre announces his retirement. Unlike last postseason, when he initially announced his retirement but decided to return, he filed official retirement papers with the NFL offices. (ESPN)

==== Basketball ====
- Euroleague Top 16, week 3:
  - Group E:
    - Asseco Prokom Sopot (Poland) 68–93 (Greece) Olympiacos
    - TAU Cerámica (Spain) 108–90 (Italy) AJ Milano
  - Group G:
    - Partizan Igokea (Serbia) 60–59 (Spain) Unicaja Málaga
  - Group H:
    - Montepaschi Siena (Italy) 74–56 (Russia) CSKA Moscow
- PBA Philippine Cup finals:
  - Talk 'N Text Tropang Texters 93, Alaska Aces 89, **Talk 'N Text wins championship series, 4–3**
    - The franchise of the Philippine Long Distance Telephone Company wins their third PBA championship and second Philippine Cup.

==== Football (soccer) ====
- 2010 FIFA World Cup Qualifying:
  - AFC (Asia) Fourth round, matchday 5:
    - Group A:
      - Japan 0–0 Australia
        - The draw leaves both teams undefeated, with Australia on top with 10 pts, 2 ahead of Japan.
      - Uzbekistan 0–1 Bahrain
        - Bahrain gets level with Qatar in third place on 4 points, while Uzbekistan is at the bottom with just 1-point.
    - Group B:
      - Iran 1–1 South Korea
        - Both teams remain unbeaten. South Korea at the top with 8 points, Iran in third place on 6 points.
      - North Korea 1–0 Saudi Arabia
        - North Korea climb to second place on 7 points, Saudi Arabia in fourth place on 4 pts.
  - UEFA (Europe):
    - Group 1:
      - Malta 0–0 Albania
    - Group 3:
      - San Marino 0–3 Northern Ireland
    - Group 8:
      - Republic of Ireland 2–1 Georgia
        - Ireland gets level with Italy at the top on 10 points.
  - CONCACAF (North-Central America) Fourth round, matchday 1:
    - United States 2–0 Mexico
      - The Americans keep their nine-year home unbeaten streak against their continental rivals alive with a pair of goals from Michael Bradley.
    - El Salvador 2–2 Trinidad and Tobago
      - The Salvadorans come back from 0–2 down to earn a draw with a pair of late goals from William Romero.
    - Costa Rica 2–0 Honduras
- Friendly internationals (selected):
  - Germany 0–1 Norway
  - France 0–2 Argentina
  - Spain 2–0 England
- Copa Libertadores group stage:
  - Group 6:
    - Lanús (Argentina) 1–1 (Mexico) Guadalajara
  - Group 8:
    - San Lorenzo (Argentina) 4–1 (Mexico) San Luis
    - Libertad (Paraguay) 2–1 (Peru) Universitario

==== Winter sports ====
===== Alpine skiing =====
- World Championships in Val-d'Isère, France:
  - Teams: Cancelled

===== Skeleton =====
- World Cup 7 in Park City, Utah, United States:
  - Men: (1) Aleksandr Tretyakov (Russia) 1:38.82 (49.49/49.33) (2) Eric Bernotas (United States) 1:38.85 (49.26/49.59) (3) Frank Rommel (Germany) 1:38.88 (49.35/49.53)
    - World Cup standing (after 7 of 8 events): (1) Tretyakov 1301 pts (2) Florian Grassl (Austria) 1243 (3) Rommel 1236
  - Women: (1) Mellisa Hollingsworth (Canada) 1:41.62 (50.89/50.89) (2) Marion Trott (Germany) 1:41.83 (50.94/50.89) (3) Noelle Pikus-Pace (United States) 1:41.89 (51.02/50.87)
    - World Cup standing (after 7 of 8 events): (1) Trott 1347 pts (2) Shelley Rudman (United Kingdom) 1308 (3) Anja Huber (Germany) 1275

===== Ski jumping =====
- World Cup in Klingenthal, Germany:
  - 140m hill: (1) Gregor Schlierenzauer (Austria) 261.2 points (131.5/135.0m) (2) Anders Jacobsen (Norway) 260.3 (135.0/131.0) (3) Wolfgang Loitzl (Austria) 257.1 (134.0/130.5)
    - Schlierenzauer wins sixth event in a row and tenth of the season.
    - Overall standings (after 20 of 27 events): (1) Schlierenzauer 1620 points (2) Simon Ammann (Switzerland) 1368 (3) Loitzl 1242

=== 10 February 2009 (Tuesday) ===
==== Cricket ====
- India in Sri Lanka:
  - Twenty20 at Colombo:
    - Sri Lanka 171/4 (20/20 ov); India 174/7 (19.2/20 ov). **India win by 3 wickets (with 4 balls remaining)**.
- New Zealand in Australia:
  - 4th ODI in Adelaide:
    - New Zealand 244/8 (50 ov); Australia 247/4 (48.2 ov). **Australia win by 6 wickets and levels the 5-match series 2–2**.

==== Football (soccer) ====
- International friendly in London:
  - Brazil 2–0 Italy
- Copa Libertadores group stage:
  - Group 2:
    - Guaraní (Paraguay) 1–2 (Venezuela) Deportivo Táchira
  - Group 4:
    - Defensor Sporting (Uruguay) 1–0 (Colombia) América de Cali
  - Group 7:
    - Aurora (Bolivia) 0–3 (Colombia) Boyacá Chicó

=== 9 February 2009 (Monday) ===
==== Baseball ====
- Alex Rodriguez admits that he used performance-enhancing drugs from 2001 to 2003. (ESPN)

==== Winter sports ====
===== Alpine skiing =====
- World Championships in Val-d'Isère, France:
  - Men's Super combined: (1) Aksel Lund Svindal (Norway) 2:23.00 (1:30.99 + 52.01) (2) Julien Lizeroux (France) 2:23.90 (1:33.92 + 49.98) (3) Natko Zrncic-Dim (Croatia) 2:24.58 (1:32.59 + 51.99)
  - Women's downhill: (1) Lindsey Vonn (United States) 1:30.31 (2) Lara Gut (Switzerland) 1:30.83 (3) Nadia Fanchini (Italy) 1:30.88
    - Vonn wins her second gold medal of the championships, while Gut wins a second silver.

=== 8 February 2009 (Sunday) ===
==== American football ====
- NFL:
  - Pro Bowl in Honolulu:
    - NFC 30, AFC 21
      - The Arizona Cardinals' wide receiver Larry Fitzgerald scores two touchdowns for the NFC and is named the game's MVP.

==== Cricket ====
- India in Sri Lanka:
  - 5th ODI at Colombo:
    - Sri Lanka 320/8 (50 ov); India 252 (48.5 ov). **Sri Lanka win by 68 runs. India win 5-match series 4–1**
- New Zealand in Australia:
  - 3rd ODI in Sydney:
    - Australia 301/9 (50 ov); New Zealand 269 (47.3 ov). **Australia win by 32 runs. New Zealand lead 5-match series 2–1**

==== Golf ====
- PGA Tour:
  - Buick Invitational in La Jolla, California:
    - Winner: Nick Watney (United States) 277 (−11)
- European Tour:
  - Indian Masters in Delhi, India: Cancelled

==== Ice hockey ====
- Olympic men's qualifying tournament:
  (teams in **bold** qualify to 2010 Olympic tournament)
  - Group E in Hanover, Germany
    - Japan 2–5 Austria
    - **Germany** 2–1 Slovenia
  - Group F in Riga, Latvia
    - Hungary 3–4(SO) Ukraine
    - **Latvia** 4–1 Italy
  - Group G in Oslo, Norway
    - Kazakhstan 8–2 France
    - **Norway** 5–3 Denmark

==== Rugby union ====
- Six Nations Championship, week 1:
  - Scotland 13–26 Wales in Edinburgh

==== Tennis ====
- ATP Tour:
  - Movistar Open in Viña del Mar, Chile:
    - Final: (Chile) Fernando González beat (Argentina) José Acasuso 6–1, 6–3
  - PBZ Zagreb Indoors in Zagreb, Croatia:
    - Final: (Croatia) Marin Čilić beat (Croatia) Mario Ančić 6–3, 6–4
  - SA Tennis Open in Johannesburg, South Africa:
    - Final: (France) Jo-Wilfried Tsonga beat (France) Jérémy Chardy 6–4, 7–6 (5)
- Fed Cup:
  - World Group first round, day 2:
    - **Russia** 5–0 China in Moscow, Russia
    - France 0–5 **Italy** in Orléans, France
    - **United States** 3–2 Argentina in Surprise, Arizona, United States
    - **Czech Republic** 4–1 Spain in Brno, Czech Republic
      - In the semifinals, Italy will host Russia and Czech Republic host USA.
  - World Group II first round, day 2:
    - **Slovakia** 4–1 Belgium in Bratislava, Slovak Republic
    - Switzerland 2–3 **Germany** in Zürich, Switzerland
    - **Serbia** 4–1 Japan in Belgrade, Serbia
    - **Ukraine** 3–2 Israel in Kharkiv, Ukraine

==== Winter sports ====
===== Alpine skiing =====
- World Championships in Val-d'Isère, France:
  - Women's downhill: Postponed to Monday

===== Luge =====
- World Championships in Lake Placid, New York, United States:
  - Mixed Team Relay: (1) Germany (Felix Loch, Natalie Geisenberger, André Florschütz, Torsten Wustlich) 2:39.630 (2) Austria (Daniel Pfister, Nina Reithmeyer, Peter Penz, Georg Fischler) +1.510 (3) Latvia (Guntis Rekis, Maija Tiruma, Andris Sics, Juris Sics) +2.869

===== Nordic combined =====
- World Cup in Seefeld, Austria:
  - 10 km Gundersen: (1) Magnus Moan (Norway) 29:18.8 (2) Mario Stecher (Austria) 29:22.0 (3) Anssi Koivuranta (Finland) 29:52.5
    - World Cup standings (after 17 of 23 events): (1) Koivuranta 1033 pts (2) Moan 990 (3) Björn Kircheisen (Germany) 790
  - Team 3x5km: cancelled

===== Short track speed skating =====
- World Cup 5 in Sofia, Bulgaria:

===== Ski jumping =====
- World Cup in Willingen, Germany
  - 145m hill: (1) Gregor Schlierenzauer (Austria) 267.2 points (144.0/135.0m) (2) Simon Ammann (Switzerland) 265.2 (133.5/145.5) (3) Noriaki Kasai (Japan) 261.8 (136.0/140.0)
    - Schlierenzauer wins fifth event in a row and ninth this season.
    - World Cup standings (after 19 of 27 rounds): (1) Schlierenzauer 1,520 pts (2) Ammann 1,328 (3) Wolfgang Loitzl (Austria) 1,182

===== Speed skating =====
- World Allround Championships in Hamar, Norway:
  - Men: (1) Sven Kramer (Netherlands) 147.567 (2) Håvard Bøkko (Norway) 148.077 (3) Enrico Fabris (Italy) 149.469
  - Women: (1) Martina Sáblíková (Czech Republic) 161.616 (2) Kristina Groves (Canada) 162.264 (3) Ireen Wüst (Netherlands) 163.639

=== 7 February 2009 (Saturday) ===
==== Auto racing ====
- Sprint Cup Series:
  - Budweiser Shootout in Daytona Beach, Florida:
    - (1) (California) Kevin Harvick (2) (Missouri) Jamie McMurray (3) (Indiana) Tony Stewart

=== Baseball ===
- Sports Illustrated reports that New York Yankees superstar Alex Rodriguez tested positive for steroids in 2003, a season when he was American League MVP with the Texas Rangers. (Sports Illustrated)

==== Cricket ====
- England in West Indies:
  - 1st Test in Kingston, Jamaica, day 4:
    - England 318 and 51; West Indies 392. **West Indies win by an innings and 23 runs, lead 4-match series 1–0.**
      - England's 51 is their third-lowest Test innings score in history.

==== Ice hockey ====
- Olympic men's qualifying tournament:
  - Group E in Hanover, Germany
    - Slovenia 4–5(SO) Japan
    - Austria 1–2 Germany
      - Germany qualify to 2010 Olympic tournament
  - Group G in Oslo, Norway
    - Denmark 3–2 Kazakhstan
    - France 2–3 Norway

==== Rugby union ====
- Six Nations Championship, week 1:
  - England 36–11 Italy in London
  - Ireland 30–21 France in Dublin
- Sevens World Series:
  - Wellington Sevens in Wellington, New Zealand:
    - Final: England 19–17 New Zealand

==== Tennis ====
- Fed Cup:
  - World Group first round, day 1:
    - Russia 2–0 China in Moscow, Russia
    - France 0–2 Italy in Orléans, France
    - United States 1–1 Argentina in Surprise, Arizona, United States
    - Czech Republic 1–1 Spain in Brno, Czech Republic
  - World Group II first round, day 1:
    - Slovakia 2–0 Belgium in Bratislava, Slovak Republic
    - Switzerland 1–1 Germany in Zürich, Switzerland
    - Serbia 2–0 Japan in Belgrade, Serbia
    - Ukraine 1–1 Israel in Kharkiv, Ukraine

==== Winter sports ====
===== Alpine skiing =====
- World Championships in Val-d'Isère, France:
  - Men's downhill: (1) John Kucera (Canada) 2:07.01 (2) Didier Cuche (Switzerland) 2:07.05 (3) Carlo Janka (Switzerland) 2:07.18

===== Bobsleigh =====
- World Cup 7 in Whistler, British Columbia, Canada:
  - Four-man: (1) Jānis Miņins/Daumants Dreiškens/Oskars Melbardis/Intars Dambis (Latvia) 1:42.17 (50.97/51.20) (2) Steven Holcomb/Justin Olsen/Steve Mesler/Curtis Tomasevicz (United States) 1:42.23 (50.99/51.24) (3) Alexandre Zoubkov/Philippe Egorov/Petr Moiseev/Alexey Andryunin (Russia) 1:42.67 (51.18/51.49)
    - World Cup standings (after 6 of 7 races): (1) Zoubkov 1246 pts (2) Miņins 1129 (3) Wolfgang Stampfer (Austria) 984

===== Figure skating =====
- Four Continents Championships in Vancouver, Canada:
  - Men: (1) Patrick Chan (Canada) 249.19 pts (2) Evan Lysacek (United States) 237.15 (3) Takahiko Kozuka (Japan) 221.76

===== Freestyle skiing =====
- World Cup in Cypress Mountain, Canada:
  - Moguls men: (1) Alexandre Bilodeau (Canada) 25.65 (2) Yugo Tsukita (Japan) 25.09 (3) Guilbaut Colas (France) 24.78
  - Moguls women: (1) Jennifer Heil (Canada) 24.79 (2) Hannah Kearney (United States) 24.18 (3) Margarita Marbler (Austria) 23.84

===== Luge =====
- World Championships in Lake Placid, New York, United States:
  - Men: (1) Felix Loch (Germany) 1:44.336 (2) Armin Zöggeler (Italy) +0.213 (3) Daniel Pfister (Austria) +0.701

===== Nordic combined =====
- World Cup in Seefeld, Austria:
  - 10 km Gundersen: (1) Mario Stecher (Austria) 25:29.0 (2) Jan Schmid (Norway) 25:33.8 (3) Lukas Klapfer (Austria) 25:33.9
    - World Cup standings (after 16 of 22 events): (1) Anssi Koivuranta (Finland) 973 pts (2) Magnus Moan (Norway) 890 (3) Björn Kircheisen (Germany) 790

===== Ski jumping =====
- World Cup in Willingen, Germany
  - 145m hill team: (1) Austria 902.9 pts (2) Norway 901.2 (3) Finland 793.2

===== Snowboarding =====
- World Cup in Bardonecchia, Italy:
  - Halfpipe men: (1) Mathieu Crepel (France) (2) Nathan Johnstone (Australia) (3) Iouri Podladtchikov (Switzerland)
  - Halfpipe women: (1) Kelly Clark (United States) (2) Hannah Teter (United States) (3) Gretchen Bleiler (United States)

=== 6 February 2009 (Friday) ===
==== Cricket ====
- England in West Indies:
  - 1st Test in Kingston, Jamaica, day 3:
    - England 318; West Indies 352/7 (Ramnaresh Sarwan 107, Chris Gayle 104). West Indies led by 34 runs with 3 wickets remaining in the first innings.
- New Zealand in Australia:
  - 2nd ODI in Melbourne:
    - Australia 225/5 (50 ov); New Zealand 226/4 (48.5 ov). **New Zealand win by 6 wickets and lead 5-match series 2–0.**

==== Ice hockey ====
- Olympic men's qualifying tournament:
  - Group F in Riga, Latvia
    - Italy 4–1 Hungary
    - Ukraine 2–4 Latvia

==== Winter sports ====
===== Alpine skiing =====
- World Championships in Val-d'Isère, France:
  - Women's Super combined: (1) Kathrin Zettel (Austria) 2:20.13 (2) Lara Gut (Switzerland) 2:20.69 (3) Elisabeth Görgl (Austria) 2:21.01

===== Bobsleigh =====
- World Cup 7 in Whistler, British Columbia, Canada:
  - Two-man: (1) Thomas Florschütz/Marc Kühne (Germany) 1:43.95 (51.99/51.96) (2) Beat Hefti/Thomas Lamparter (Switzerland) 1:44.03 (52.08/51.95) (3) Pierre Lueders/David Bissett (Canada) 1:44.14 (51.98/52.16)
    - World Cup standings (after 7 of 8 races): (1) Hefti 1381 pts (2) André Lange (Germany) 1325 (3) Florschütz 1243
  - Two-woman: (1) Shauna Rohbock/Elana Meyers (United States) 1:47.10 (53.57/53.53) (2) Kaillie Humphries/Heather Moyse (Canada) 1:47.28 (53.62/53.66) (3) Erin Pac/Michelle Rzepka (United States) 1:47.40 (53.70/53.70)
    - World Cup standings (after 7 of 8 races): (1) Sandra Kiriasis (Germany) 1479 pts (2) Rohbock 1380 (3) Cathleen Martini (Germany) 1374

===== Figure skating =====
- Four Continents Championships in Vancouver, Canada:
  - Ice dance: (1) Meryl Davis/Charlie White (United States) 192.39 pts (2) Tessa Virtue/Scott Moir (Canada) 191.81 (3) Emily Samuelson/Evan Bates (United States) 180.79
  - Ladies: (1) Kim Yuna (South Korea) 189.07 pts (2) Joannie Rochette (Canada) 183.91 (3) Mao Asada (Japan) 176.52

===== Freestyle skiing =====
- World Cup in Cypress Mountain, Canada:
  - Skicross men: (1) Christopher Delbosco (Canada) (2) Stanley Hayer (Canada) (3) Davey Barr (Canada)
  - Skicross women: (1) Aleisha Cline (Canada) (2) Ashleigh Mcivor (Canada) (3) Karin Huttary (Austria)
  - Aerials men: (1) Steve Omischl (Canada) 250.96 pts (2) Anton Kushnir (Belarus) 250.96 (3) Stanislav Kravchuk (Ukraine) 250.64
  - Aerials women: (1) Evelyne Leu (Switzerland) 204.96 pts (2) Dai Shuangfei (China) 192.73 (3) Cheng Shuang (China) 182.41

===== Luge =====
- World Championships in Lake Placid, New York, United States:
  - Women: (1) Erin Hamlin (United States) 128.098 (2) Natalie Geisenberger (Germany) +0.187 (3) Natalia Yakushenko (Ukraine) +0.236
    - Hamlin is the first ever non-European medallist in Luge World Championships, and the first non-German winner since 1993.
  - Doubles: (1) Gerhard Plankensteiner/Oswald Haselrieder (Italy) 1:27.401 (2) Andre Florschütz/Torsten Wustlich (Germany) 1:27.458 (3) Mark Grimmette/Brian Martin (United States) 1:27.611

=== 5 February 2009 (Thursday) ===
==== Basketball ====
- Euroleague Top 16, week 2:
  - Group E:
    - Olympiacos (Greece) 73–70 (Spain) TAU Cerámica
    - Asseco Prokom Sopot (Poland) 60–62 (Italy) AJ Milano
  - Group F:
    - ALBA Berlin (Germany) 84–87 (Spain) Real Madrid
    - Regal FC Barcelona (Spain) 85–65 (Israel) Maccabi Tel Aviv

=== Boxing ===
- Unbeaten super middleweight and light heavyweight champion Joe Calzaghe announces his retirement. (BBC Sport)

==== Cricket ====
- England in West Indies:
  - 1st Test in Kingston, Jamaica, day 2:
    - England 318; West Indies 160/1 (Ramnaresh Sarwan 74*, Chris Gayle 71*). West Indies trail by 158 runs with 9 wickets remaining in the first innings.
- India in Sri Lanka:
  - 4th ODI at Colombo:
    - India 332/5 (50 ov; Gautam Gambhir 150); Sri Lanka 265 (48.0 ov). **India win by 67 runs and lead 5-match series 4–0.**

==== Ice hockey ====
- Olympic men's qualifying tournament:
  - Group E in Hanover, Germany
    - Slovenia 3–4(OT) Austria
    - Germany 7–1 Japan
  - Group F in Riga, Latvia
    - Italy 2–3 Ukraine
    - Latvia 7–3 Hungary
  - Group G in Oslo, Norway
    - Denmark 1–2(OT) France
    - Norway 2–1 Kazakhstan

==== Winter sports ====
===== Figure skating =====
- Four Continents Championships in Vancouver, Canada:
  - Ice dance (after original dance): (1) Tessa Virtue/Scott Moir (Canada) 97.30 pts (2) Meryl Davis/Charlie White (United States) 95.65 (3) Emily Samuelson/Evan Bates (United States) 90.89
  - Pairs: (1) Pang Qing/Tong Jian (China) 194.94 pts (2) Jessica Dubé/Bryce Davison (Canada) 185.62 (3) Zhang Dan/Zhang Hao (China) 174.98
  - Men's short program: (1) Patrick Chan (Canada) 88.90 pts (2) Evan Lysacek (United States) 81.65 (3) Takahiko Kozuka (Japan) 76.61

===== Skeleton =====
- World Cup 7 in Whistler, British Columbia, Canada:
  - Men: (1) Jon Montgomery (Canada) 1:47.67 (53.68/53.99) (2) Gregor Stähli (Switzerland) 1:48.06 (53.69/54.37) (3) Jeff Pain (Canada) 1:48.19 (53.67/54.52) & Matthew Antoine (United States) 1:48.19 (53.83/54.36)
    - World Cup standings (after 6 of 7 races): (1) Aleksandr Tretyakov (Russia) 1076 pts (2) Florian Grassl (Germany) 1067 (3) Frank Rommel (Germany) 1036
  - Women: (1) Marion Trott (Germany) 1:49.86 (54.90/54.96) (2) Amy Williams (United Kingdom) 1:50.39 (54.95/55.44) (3) Anja Huber (Germany) 1:50.71 (55.26/55.45)
    - World Cup standings (after 6 of 7 races): (1) Shelley Rudman (United Kingdom) 1148 pts (2) Trott 1137 (3) Huber 1131

===== Snowboarding =====
- World Cup in Bardonecchia, Italy:
  - Slopestyle men: cancelled
  - Slopestyle women: cancelled

=== 4 February 2009 (Wednesday) ===
==== Basketball ====
- Euroleague Top 16, week 2:
  - Group G:
    - Unicaja Málaga (Spain) 69–81 (Greece) Panathinaikos
    - Partizan Igokea (Serbia) 84–76 (Italy) Lottomatica Roma
  - Group H:
    - CSKA Moscow (Russia) 87–61 (Croatia) Cibona Zagreb
    - Montepaschi Siena (Italy) 87–79 (Turkey) Fenerbahçe Ülker

==== Cricket ====
- England in West Indies:
  - 1st Test in Kingston, Jamaica, day 1:
    - England 236/5 (Kevin Pietersen 97)
- Zimbabwe in Kenya:
  - 5th ODI in Nairobi:
    - Kenya 199 (48.5 ov); Zimbabwe 203/3 (35 ov). **Zimbabwe win by 7 wickets and win the series 5–0.**

==== Winter sports ====
===== Alpine skiing =====
- World Championships in Val-d'Isère, France:
  - Men's Super giant slalom: (1) Didier Cuche (Switzerland) 1:19.41 (2) Peter Fill (Italy) 1:20.40 (3) Aksel Lund Svindal (Norway) 1:20.43

===== Figure skating =====
- Four Continents Championships in Vancouver, Canada:
  - Compulsory dance: (1) Tessa Virtue/Scott Moir (Canada) 36.40 pts (2) Meryl Davis/Charlie White (United States) 35.23 (3) Vanessa Crone/Paul Poirier (Canada) 32.43
  - Pairs' short program: (1) Pang Qing/Tong Jian (China) 65.60 pts (2) Jessica Dubé/Bryce Davison (Canada) 64.36 (3) Zhang Dan/Zhang Hao (China) 63.20
  - Ladies' short program: (1) Kim Yuna (South Korea) 72.24 pts (2) Joannie Rochette (Canada) 66.90 (3) Cynthia Phaneuf (Canada) 60.98

=== 3 February 2009 (Tuesday) ===
==== Cricket ====
- India in Sri Lanka:
  - 3rd ODI at Colombo:
    - India 363/5 (50 ov); Sri Lanka 216 (41.4 ov). **India win by 147 runs, lead 5-match series 3–0**.

==== Winter sports ====
===== Alpine skiing =====
- World Championships in Val-d'Isère, France:
  - Women's Super giant slalom: (1) Lindsey Vonn (United States) 1:20.73 (2) Marie Marchand-Arvier (France) 1:21.07 (3) Andrea Fischbacher (Austria) 1:21.13

=== 1 February 2009 (Sunday) ===
==== American football ====
- NFL:
  - Super Bowl XLIII in Tampa, Florida:
    - Pittsburgh Steelers 27, Arizona Cardinals 23
      - The Steelers win the Vince Lombardi Trophy for a record sixth time.

==== Auto racing ====
- World Rally Championship:
  - Rally Ireland: (1) Sébastien Loeb (France) Daniel Elena (Monaco) Citroën C4 WRC 2:48:25.7 (2) Dani Sordo (Spain) Marc Marti (Spain) Citroën C4 WRC 2:49:53.6 (3) Mikko Hirvonen (Finland) Jarmo Lehtinen (Finland) Ford Focus RS WRC 08 2:50:33.5

==== Cricket ====
- New Zealand in Australia:
  - 1st ODI in Perth:
    - Australia 181 (48.4 ov); New Zealand 185/8 (50.0 ov). **New Zealand win by 2 wickets in the last ball, lead 5-match series 1–0.**
- Zimbabwe in Kenya:
  - 4th ODI in Nairobi:
    - Zimbabwe 285/8 (50 ov); Kenya 219 (49 ov). **Zimbabwe win by 66 runs, lead 5-match series 4–0.**

==== Darts ====
- Professional Darts Corporation:
  - Players Championship finals in Purfleet, Essex:
    - Final:
      - (England) Phil Taylor 16–9 (legs) (Scotland) Robert Thornton

==== Football (soccer) ====
- UNCAF Nations Cup in Tegucigalpa, Honduras:
  - Final:
    - Costa Rica 0–0 Panama
      - Panama win 5–3 on penalties, win first title
  - Third place:
    - El Salvador 0–1 Honduras

==== Golf ====
- PGA Tour:
  - FBR Open in Scottsdale, Arizona
    - Winner: Kenny Perry (United States) 270 (−14)
- European Tour:
  - Dubai Desert Classic in Dubai, United Arab Emirates
    - Winner: Rory McIlroy (Northern Ireland) 269 (−19)

==== Handball ====
- World Men's Championship in Croatia
  - Final:
    - Croatia 19–24 France
      - France wins its third World Championship title.
  - Bronze Match:
    - Poland 31–23 Denmark

==== Tennis ====
- Australian Open in Melbourne, day 14:
  (seeding in parentheses)
  - Men's singles final:
    - Rafael Nadal (Spain) (1) beat Roger Federer (Switzerland) (2) 7–5, 3–6, 7–6(3), 3–6, 6–2
      - Nadal wins his sixth Grand Slam title and becomes the first player who wins Grand Slams on three different surfaces within one year.
  - Mixed doubles final:
    - Sania Mirza (India) /Mahesh Bhupathi (India) beat Nathalie Dechy (France) /Andy Ram (Israel) 6–3, 6–1

==== Winter sports ====
===== Alpine skiing =====
- Men's World Cup in Garmisch-Partenkirchen, Germany:
  - Slalom: (1) Manfred Mölgg (Italy) 1:46.77 (54.57 + 52.20) (2) Giorgio Rocca (Italy) 1:47.06 (54.60 + 52.46) (3) Reinfried Herbst (Austria) 1:47.37 (54.49 + 52.88)
    - Overall World Cup rankings (after 26 of 38 races): (1) Ivica Kostelic (Croatia) 742 points (2) Jean-Baptiste Grange (France) 706 (3) Benjamin Raich (Austria) 680
    - Slalom World Cup rankings (after eight of ten races): (1) Grange 479 points (2) Kostelic 408 (3) Herbst 376
- Women's World Cup in Garmisch-Partenkirchen, Germany:
  - Super giant slalom: (1) Lindsey Vonn (United States) 1:22.16 (2) Anja Paerson (Sweden) 1:22.55 (3) Jessica Lindell-Vikarby (Sweden) 1:22.88
    - World Cup overall standings (after 22 of 34 races): (1) Vonn 1114 points (2) Maria Riesch (Germany) 935 (3) Paerson 855

===== Cross-country skiing =====
- World Cup in Rybinsk, Russia:
  - Men pursuit: cancelled
  - Women pursuit: cancelled

===== Nordic combined =====
- World Cup in Chaux-Neuve, France:
  - 10 km Gundersen: (1) Anssi Koivuranta (Finland) 27min 29.4sec (1st) (2) Christoph Bieler (Austria) at 4.0 (3rd) (3) Magnus Moan (Norway) 6.0 (27th)
    - Overall World Cup standings (after 15 of 22 events): (1) Koivuranta 953 points (2) Moan 861 (3) Bjorn Kircheisen (Germany) 754

===== Ski jumping =====
- World Cup in Sapporo, Japan:
  - 134m hill: cancelled

===== Speed skating =====
- World Cup 7 in Erfurt, Germany:
  - Men's 1000 m: (1) Shani Davis (United States) 1:08.40 (2) Denny Morrison (Canada) 1:08.78 (3) Jan Bos (Netherlands) 1:09.03
  - Women's 1000 m: (1) Anni Friesinger (Germany) 1:15.61 (2) Yu Jing (China) 1:16.41 (3) Jin Peiyu (China) 1:16.42
  - Men's Team Pursuit: (1) Canada (Denny Morrison, Lucas Makowsky, Jay Morrison) 3:46.03 (2) Italy (Matteo Anesi, Enrico Fabris, Luca Stefani) 3:46.56 (3) Norway (Håvard Bøkko, Sverre Haugli, Stian Elvenes) 3:48.39
    - Final World Cup standings: (1) Canada 310 (2) Italy 220 (3) Japan 210
  - Women's Team Pursuit: (1) Czech Republic (Karolína Erbanová, Andrea Jirků, Martina Sáblíková) 3:05.32 (2) Russia (Galina Likhachova, Alla Shabanova, Yekaterina Shikhova) 3:05.80 (3) Poland (Natalia Czerwonka, Katarzyna Wojcicka, Luiza Złotkowska) 3:06.26
    - Final World Cup standings: (1) Czech Republic 235 (2) USA 205 (3) Netherlands 200
