= Lamparter (surname) =

Lamparter is a surname. Notable people with the surname include:

- Johannes Lamparter (born 2001), Austrian skier
- Thomas Lamparter (born 1978), Swiss bobsledder
