= Udvari (surname) =

Udvari is a Hungarian surname, an adjective of Udvar, a name of a village in Hungary. Notable people with the surname include:

- Andreas Udvari (born 1981), German bobsledder
- Frank Udvari (1924–2014), Canadian ice hockey referee
- Szabolcs Udvari (1974–2020), Hungarian footballer
