= Indian cricket team in Sri Lanka in 2008–09 =

International cricket tour

Indian cricket team in Sri Lanka in 2009
	Sri Lanka	India
- Dates: 28 January – 10 February 2009
Captains	Mahela Jayawardene; Tillakaratne Dilshan (T20I)	MS Dhoni

One Day International series
- Results: India won the 5-match series 4–1
Most runs	Kumar Sangakkara (271)	Yuvraj Singh (284)
Most wickets	Nuwan Kulasekara (7)	Ishant Sharma (10)
- Player of the series: Yuvraj Singh (Ind)

Twenty20 International series
- Results: India won the 1-match series 1–0
Most runs	Tillakaratne Dilshan (61)	Suresh Raina (35)
Most wickets	Malinga Bandara (3)	Yusuf Pathan (2)
- Player of the series: Yusuf Pathan (Ind)

The Indian cricket team toured Sri Lanka from 28 January to 10 February 2009. The tour included five ODIs and one T20I. India won the ODI series 4-1 and also the T20I.

== Squad ==
India's squad for the ODI series was announced on 18 January. It was Ravindra Jadeja's maiden call up to the national Indian squad. Praveen Kumar also returned after being dropped for the home ODI series against England. Kumar and Jadeja replaced Harbhajan Singh who was injured and Virat Kohli who was dropped in favour of the all rounder Jadeja. After the first ODI Munaf Patel sustained a groin injury and Lakshmipathy Balaji was called up to the squad after a four-year hiatus having last played for India in 2005.

Sri Lanka announced their squad for the first three ODI's on 26 January. The squad was unchanged from the one that toured Pakistan.

ODIs		T20Is	
Sri Lanka	India	Sri Lanka	India
Mahela Jayawardene (c); Kumar Sangakkara (vc, wk); Sanath Jayasuriya; Upul Tharanga; Jehan Mubarak; Chamara Kapugedera; Tillakaratne Dilshan; Thilina Kandamby; Muttiah Muralitharan; Ajantha Mendis; Farveez Maharoof; Dilhara Fernando; Nuwan Kulasekara; Thilan Thushara; Angelo Mathews	MS Dhoni (c, wk); Virender Sehwag (vc); Sachin Tendulkar; Gautam Gambhir; Yuvraj Singh; Suresh Raina; Rohit Sharma; Yusuf Pathan; Zaheer Khan; Ishant Sharma; ~~Munaf Patel~~; Ravindra Jadeja; Praveen Kumar; Irfan Pathan; Pragyan Ojha; Lakshmipathy Balaji	Tillakaratne Dilshan (c); Chamara Kapugedera (vc); Sanath Jayasuriya; Jehan Mubarak; Chamara Silva; Indika de Saram; Lasith Malinga; Dilhara Fernando; Farveez Maharoof; Kaushalya Weeraratne; Malinga Bandara; Jeevantha Kulatunga; Dilhara Lokuhettige; Mahela Udawatte; Thilan Thushara	MS Dhoni (c, wk); Yuvraj Singh (vc); Virender Sehwag; Gautam Gambhir; Suresh Raina; Rohit Sharma; Yusuf Pathan; Zaheer Khan; Ishant Sharma; Ravindra Jadeja; Praveen Kumar; Irfan Pathan; Pragyan Ojha; Lakshmipathy Balaji

== ODI series ==
=== 1st ODI ===
28 January
Scorecard

Sri Lanka; 246/7 (50 overs)	v	India; 247/4 (48.1 overs)
Sanath Jayasuriya 107 (114); Ishant Sharma 3/52 (10 overs)		Gautam Gambhir 62 (68); Farveez Maharoof 1/35 (8 overs)

India won by 6 wickets
Rangiri Dambulla International Stadium, Dambulla
Umpires: Brian Jerling (SA) and Kumar Dharmasena (SL)
Player of the match: Sanath Jayasuriya (SL)

- India won the toss and elected to field.

=== 2nd ODI ===
31 January (D/N)
Scorecard

India; 256/9 (50 overs)	v	Sri Lanka; 241 (49.2 overs)
Yuvraj Singh 66 (88); Farveez Maharoof 2/40 (10 overs)		Thilina Kandamby 93* (129); Ishant Sharma 4/57 (10 overs)

India won by 15 runs
R. Premadasa Stadium, Colombo
Umpires: Brian Jerling (SA) and Gamini Silva (SL)
Player of the match: Ishant Sharma (Ind)

- India won the toss and elected to bat.

=== 3rd ODI ===
3 February (D/N)
Scorecard

India; 363/5 (50 overs)	v	Sri Lanka; 216 (41.4 overs)
Yuvraj Singh 117 (95); Muttiah Muralitharan 1/60 (10 overs)		Kumar Sangakkara 83 (82); Pragyan Ojha 4/38 (10 overs)

India won by 147 runs
R. Premadasa Stadium, Colombo
Umpires: Brian Jerling (SA) and Gamini Silva (SL)
Player of the match: Yuvraj Singh (Ind)

- India won the toss and elected to bat.

=== 4th ODI ===
5 February (D/N)
Scorecard

India; 332/5 (50 overs)	v	Sri Lanka; 265 (48 overs)
Gautam Gambhir 150 (147); Nuwan Kulasekara 3/63 (10 overs)		Kumar Sangakkara 56 (74); Irfan Pathan 3/58 (7 overs)

India won by 67 runs
R. Premadasa Stadium, Colombo
Umpires: Brian Jerling (SA) and Kumar Dharmasena (SL)
Player of the match: Gautam Gambhir (Ind)

- India won the toss and elected to bat.
- Muttiah Muralitharan (SL) became the highest wicket-taker in ODIs (503).

=== 5th ODI ===
8 February
Scorecard

Sri Lanka; 320/8 (50 Overs)	v	India; 252 (48.5 Overs)
Tillakaratne Dilshan 97 (117); Ishant Sharma 3/60 (10 overs)		Yuvraj Singh 73 (62); Muttiah Muralitharan 2/41 (10 overs)

Sri Lanka won by 68 runs
R. Premadasa Stadium, Colombo
Umpires: Brian Jerling (SA) and Tyron Wijewardene (SL)
Player of the match: Kumar Sangakkara (SL)

- Sri Lanka won the toss and elected to bat.
- Ravindra Jadeja (Ind) made his ODI debut.

== T20I series ==
=== Only T20I ===
10 February
19:00 SLST (D/N)
Scorecard

Sri Lanka; 171/4 (20 overs)	v	India; 174/7 (19.2 overs)
Tillakaratne Dilshan 61 (47); Yusuf Pathan 2/23 (4 overs)		Suresh Raina 35 (27); Malinga Bandara 3/32 (4 overs)

India won by 3 wickets
R. Premadasa Stadium, Colombo
Umpires: Tyron Wijewardene (SL) and Gamini Silva (SL)
Player of the match: Yusuf Pathan (Ind)

- Sri Lanka won the toss and elected to bat.
- Indika de Saram (SL) and Ravindra Jadeja (Ind) both made their T20I debuts.
