= Patricia Polifka =

German bobsledder (born 1984)

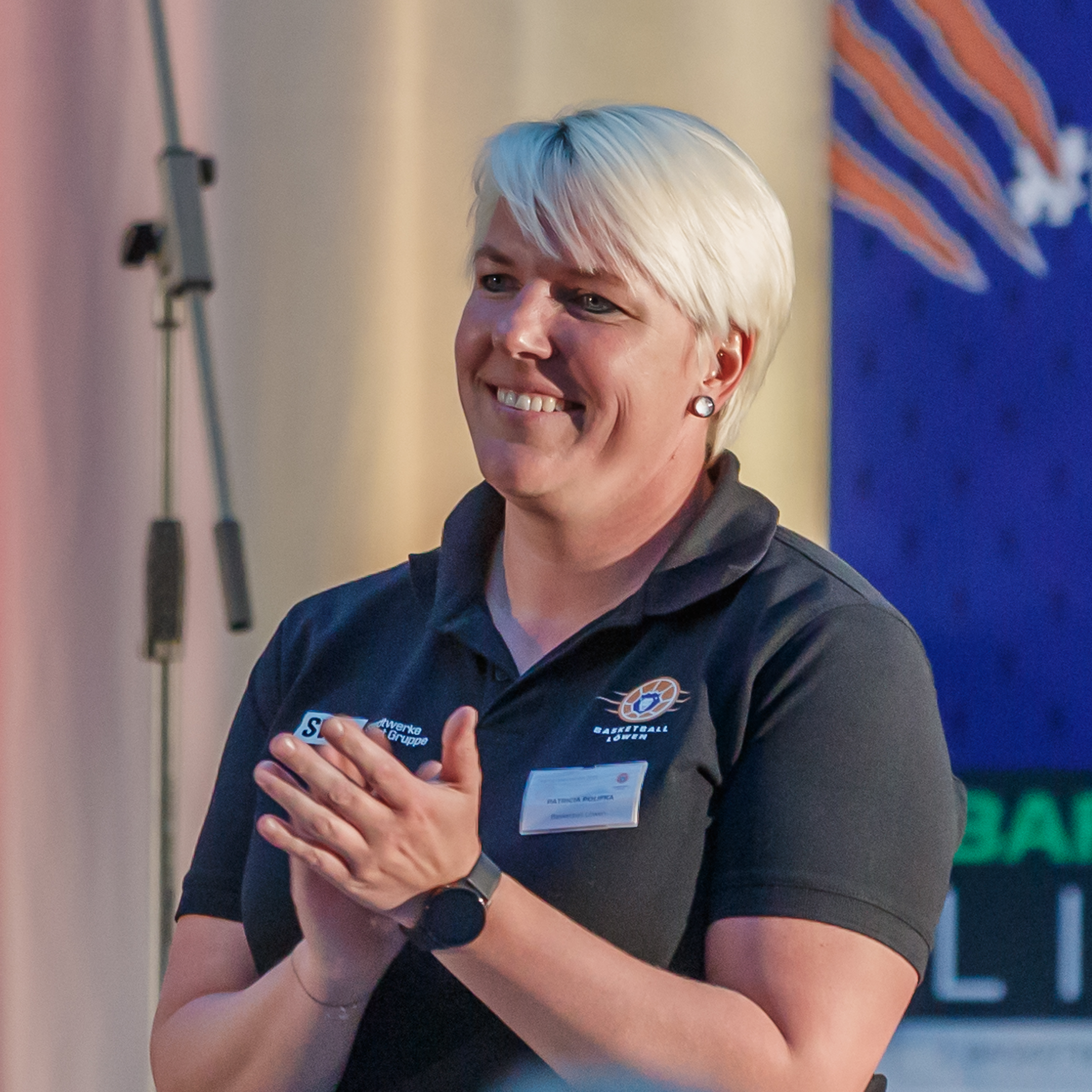

Medal record

Women's bobsleigh

Representing Germany

World Championships
Gold medal – first place	2009 Lake Placid	Mixed team

Patricia Polifka (born 8 November 1984 in Gera, East Germany) is a German bobsledder who has competed since 2005. She was a push athlete for Claudia Schramm during the 2006/07 season, alongside Stephanie Szczurek and Nicole Herschmann. She won a gold in the mixed team event at the 2009 FIBT World Championships in Lake Placid, New York. She finished seventh in the two-woman event at those same championships.

Polifka's best World Cup finish was second in the two-woman event at Altenberg, Germany in 2006.
