= Francesca Iossi =

Italian bobsledder (born 1977)

Francesca Iossi (born 24 May 1977) is a former Italian bobsledder who competed with the Italian National Team from 2002 to 2011. Her best World Cup finish was 14th in the two-woman event at St. Moritz, Switzerland in January 2009. In the 2010 Vancouver Winter Games, she qualified in the second group. In the 2018 and 2022 Winter Olympics, she was chosen as a bobsleigh judge. At the 2026 Winter Olympics in Milano Cortina, she led the International Bobsleigh and Skeleton Federation Jury as President. After retiring as an athlete, she became a sports teacher at a high school in Domodossola.
