= Matej Juhart =

German bobsledder (born 1976)

Matej Juhart (born November 19, 1976) is a Slovenian bobsledder who competed for Germany and Croatia and has been a regular in international bobsled competitions since 2005. His lone World Cup victory was in a four-man event at Altenberg, Germany in December 2008.
