= Claudia Schramm =

German bobsledder (born 1975)

Personal information
- Born: 14 June 1975 (age 51) Bad Langensalza, East Germany
Medal record
Women's bobsleigh
Representing Germany
World Championships
Bronze medal – third place	2008 Altenberg	Two-woman
European Championships
Silver medal – second place	2004 Sigulda	Two-woman

Claudia Schramm (born 14 June 1975 in Bad Langensalza) is a German bobsledder who has competed since 2000. She won a bronze in the two-woman event at the 2008 FIBT World Championships in Altenberg, Germany.

Schramm finished seventh in the two-woman event at the 2010 Winter Olympics in Vancouver.
