= Marc Kühne =

German bobsledder (born 1976)

Personal information
- Born: 6 September 1976 (age 49) Halle, Saxony-Anhalt, East Germany
- Height: 1.97 m (6 ft 6 in)
- Weight: 105 kg (231 lb; 16.5 st)

Sport
- Country: Germany
- Sport: Bobsleigh
- Turned pro: 1998

Achievements and titles
- Olympic finals: 5th
Medal record
Men´s Bobsleigh
Representing Germany
World Championships
Gold medal – first place	2007 St. Moritz	Mixed team
Silver medal – second place	2009 Lake Placid	Two-man

Marc Kühne (born 6 September 1976 in Halle, Saxony-Anhalt) is a German bobsledder who has competed since 1998. He won two medals at the FIBT World Championships with a gold in the mixed team (2007) and a silver in the two-man (2009).

Kühne also finished fifth in the two-man event at the 2006 Winter Olympics in Turin.
