= Andreas Udvari =

German bobsledder (born 1981)

Andreas Udvari (born 15 December 1981) is a retired German decathlete and bobsledder who competed from 2004 to 2007. His best Bobsleigh World Cup finish was third in the four-man event at Igls in January 2007.
