= Nicola Minichiello =

British bobsledder

Personal information
- Born: Nicola Gautier; 21 March 1978 (age 48)
Medal record
Bobsleigh
Representing Great Britain
World Championships
Gold medal – first place	2009 Lake Placid	Two-woman
Silver medal – second place	2005 Calgary	Two-woman
European Championships
Bronze medal – third place	2009 St. Moritz	Two-woman

Nicola Minichiello (born Nicola Gautier on 21 March 1978) is a retired British bobsledder who competed between 2001 and 2011. She won two medals in the two-woman event at the FIBT World Championships, winning a silver in 2005 and making history with a gold in 2009 partnering Gillian Cooke, to become the first British female bobsleigh driver to win a World Championships. Competing in three Winter Olympics, Minichiello earned her best finish of ninth in the two-woman event at Turin in 2006. This was also the best ever Olympic result by a GB women’s bobsleigh team.

Before taking up bobsleigh, Minichiello had competed (under her maiden name of Gautier) for Sheffield Athletic Club in shot put, javelin and heptathlon. Her lifetime best for the heptathlon was 5784 points, which she achieved in Austria in 2001. While competing in athletics, she met and married Toni Minichiello, coach of World and Olympic heptathlon champion Jessica Ennis. Nicola was involved in coaching Ennis during Ennis' early years in athletics. When not bobsledding, Minichiello worked as a part-time P.E. teacher and also as an athlete mentor for the Youth Sport trust. It was announced on 10 August 2010 that Minichiello would miss the 2010-11 Bobsleigh World Cup, including the FIBT World Championships 2011, due to a knee injury. Subsequently, in April 2011 Minichiello announced her retirement as a driver and took up a position as head development coach at the sport's governing body, the International Bobsleigh & Skeleton Federation (French: Fédération Internationale de Bobsleigh et de Tobogganing).

In August 2012, she became the head of performance for the Netherlands Olympic Bobsleigh team, becoming the first woman to head a Winter Olympic sports organisation. In this role she coached Esmé Kamphuis and Judith Vis to fourth place in the two-woman event at the 2014 Winter Olympics in Sochi, Russia. In September 2014 she was announced as the FIBT's new coordinator for North American races, with responsibility for bobsleigh and skeleton races on the North American Cup and Intercontinental Cup in Canada and the United States.
