= Thomas Lamparter =

Swiss bobsledder (born 1978)

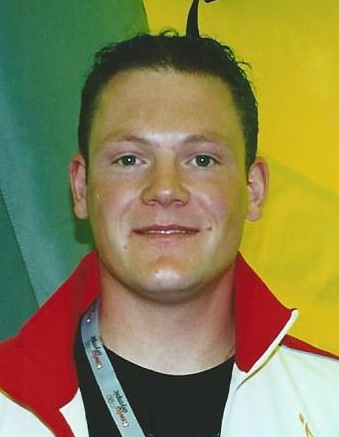

Medal record

Bobsleigh

Olympic Games
Bronze medal – third place	2006 Turin	Four-man

World Championships
Gold medal – first place	2007 St. Moritz	Four-man
Silver medal – second place	2013 St. Moritz	Two-man
Bronze medal – third place	2007 St. Moritz	Mixed team

Thomas Lamparter (born 9 June 1978) is a Swiss former bobsledder who has competed since 2002. Competing in three Winter Olympics, he won a bronze medal in the four-man event at Turin in 2006 as part of the crew of Martin Annen.

Lamparter also won two medals at the 2007 FIBT World Championships in St. Moritz with a gold in the four-man event (piloted by Ivo Rüegg) and a bronze at the bobsleigh-skeleton mixed team event. Lamparter also enjoyed success as a brakeman in two-man competition alongside Beat Hefti, with the pair winning European Championship golds in 2010 and 2013, a World Championship silver in 2013, and Bobsleigh World Cup titles in 2009 and 2012.

In March 2014 Lamparter announced his retirement from competition.
