= Alexey Andryunin =

Russian bobsledder

Personal information
- Nationality: Russian
- Born: 18 June 1976 Russia
- Years active: 1998–present

Sport
- Sport: Bobsleigh
- Event(s): Two-man, Four-man

Alexey Andryunin (born June 18, 1976) is a Russian bobsledder who has competed since 1998. His only Bobsleigh World Cup victory was in the four-man event at Lake Placid in December 2007.

Andryunin's best finish at the FIBT World Championships was eighth in the two-man event at Altenberg in 2008.
