= Steve Mesler =

American bobsledder (born 1978)

Steve Mesler MSM
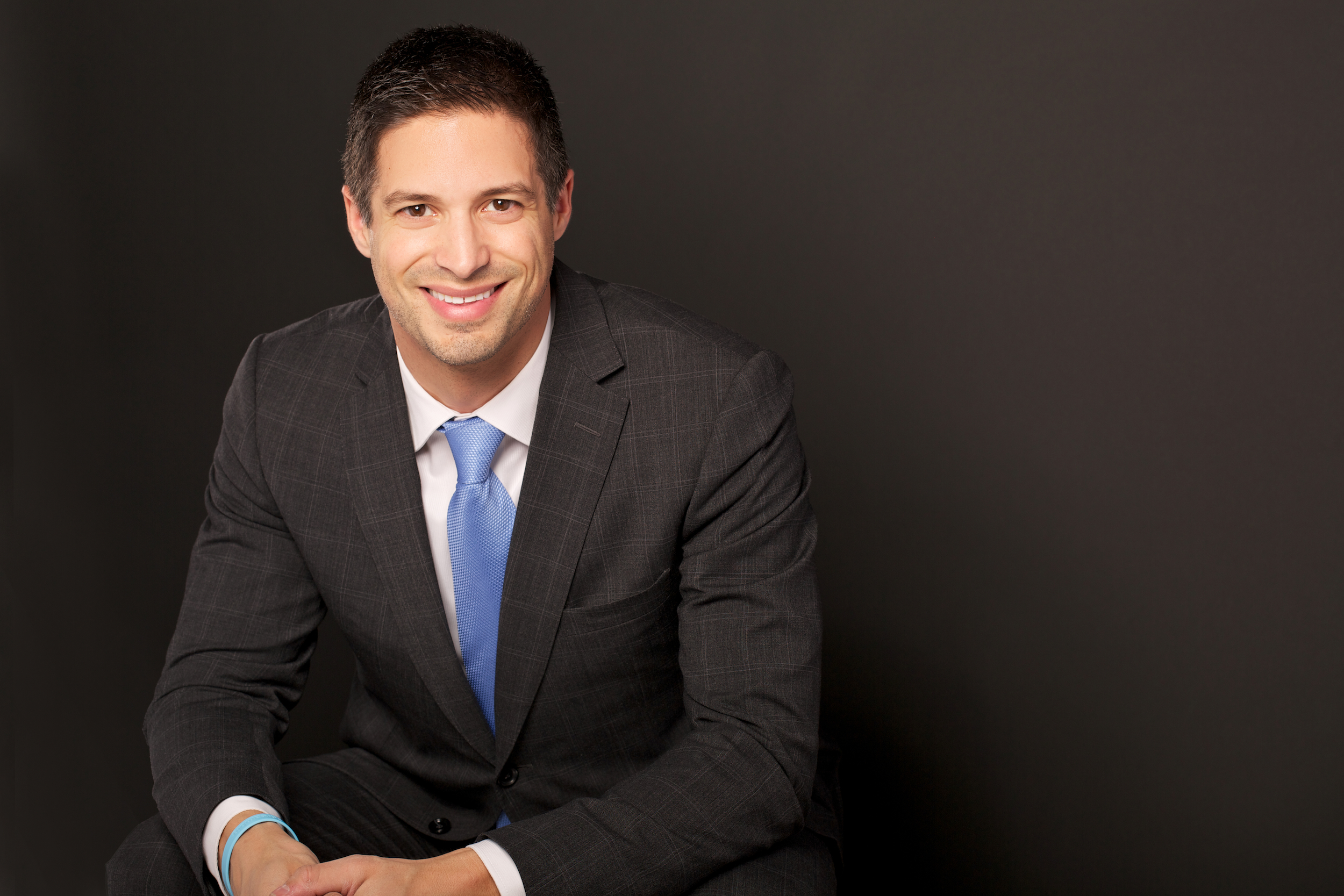
- Mesler in 2014

Personal information
- Full name: Steven Michael Mesler
- National team: United States
- Born: August 28, 1978 (age 47) Buffalo, New York, U.S.
- Height: 6 ft 2 in (1.88 m)
- Spouse: Rhiannon MacDonnell Mesler (2016-present)
- Website: SteveMesler.org

Sport
- Sport: Bobsleigh
- Event: Four-man
- Coached by: Stuart McMillan, Brian Shimer

Achievements and titles
- Olympic finals: 2002, 2006, 2010
- Highest world ranking: World Champion, Olympic Champion
Medal record
Men's bobsleigh
Representing the United States
Olympic Games
Gold medal – first place	2010 Vancouver	Four-man
World Championships
Gold medal – first place	2009 Lake Placid	Four-man
Bronze medal – third place	2004 Königssee	Four-man

Steven Michael Mesler (born August 28, 1978) is an American former bobsledder.

== Early life and sport career ==
Mesler was born in Buffalo, New York, and is Jewish on his mother's side. He attended City Honors School in Buffalo, graduating in 1996.

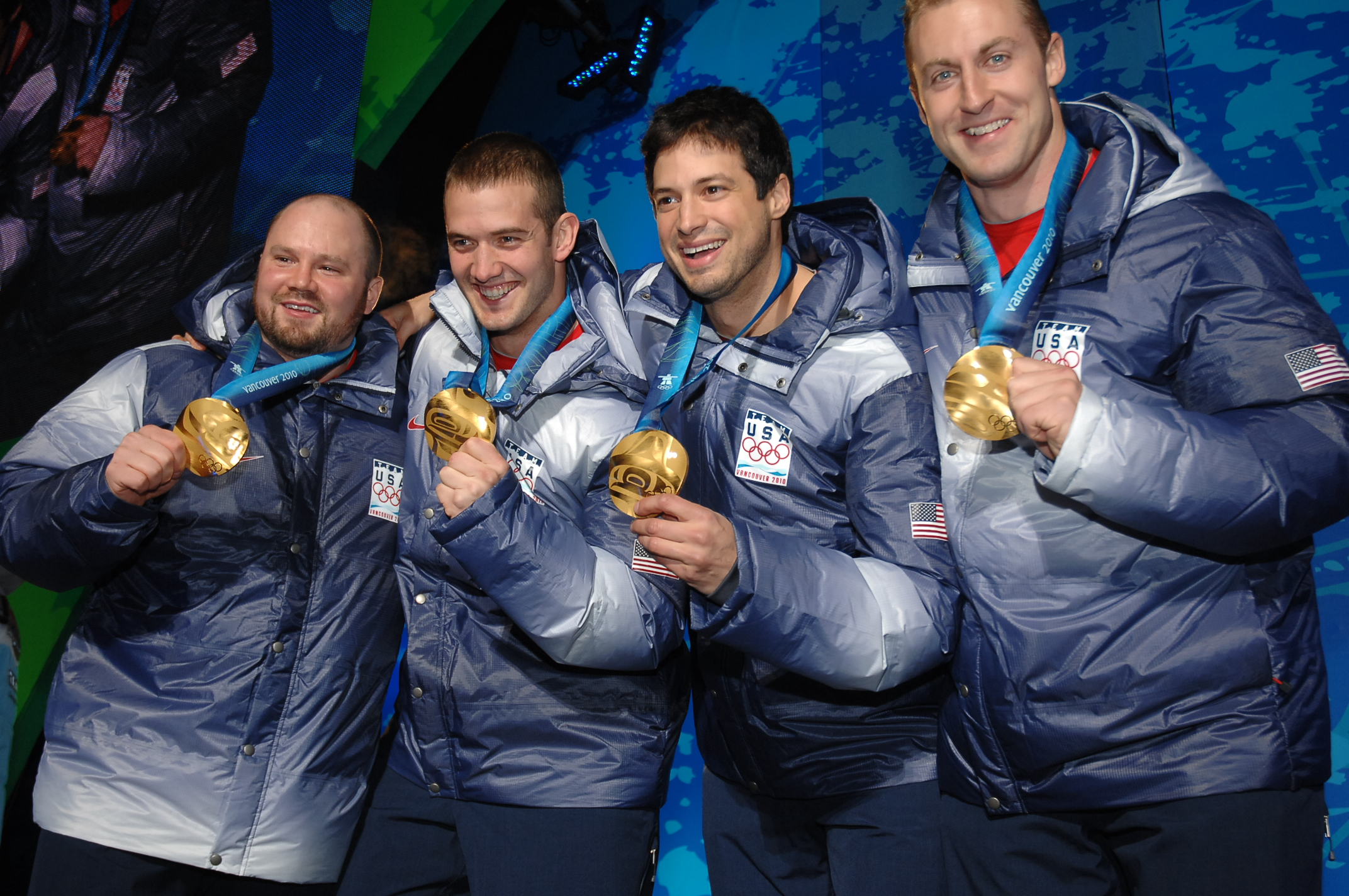
Steve Mesler and his USA 1 4-man Bobsled team, aka The Night Train, after winning the gold medal at the 2010 Vancouver Winter Olympics. This was the U.S.'s first 4-man bobsled gold medal in 62 years.

Mesler attended the University of Florida in Gainesville, Florida, where he competed as a decathlete for the Florida Gators track and field team from 1997 to 2000. He graduated from the University of Florida with a bachelor's degree, with honors, in exercise and sports science in 2000.

Mesler won a gold medal as a pusher for driver Steve Holcomb's U.S. Olympic team in the four-man event at the 2010 Winter Olympics. This was the first gold medal for the United States in 62 years.

Mesler's team finished seventh in the four-man event at Turin in 2006. He won two medals in the four-man event at the FIBT World Championships with a gold in 2009, a first in 50 years for the United States, and a bronze in 2004.

In March 2011, he was inducted into the National Jewish Sports Hall of Fame and in October 2011 he was inducted into the Buffalo Sports Hall of Fame.

== See also ==
- Florida Gators
- List of Olympic medalists in bobsleigh
- List of University of Florida alumni
- List of University of Florida Olympians
- List of Jewish Olympic medalists
