= Gillian Cooke =

Scottish athlete (born 1982)

Personal information
- Born: 3 October 1982 (age 43) Edinburgh, Scotland
Medal record
Bobsleigh
Representing Great Britain
World Championships
Gold medal – first place	2009 Lake Placid	Two-woman
European Championships
Bronze medal – third place	2009 St. Moritz	Two-woman

Gillian Cooke (born 3 October 1982) is a Scottish track and field athlete and bobsledder. She was born and brought up in Edinburgh, and educated at George Watson's College. She began her sporting career in track and field with Edinburgh Southern Harriers. In 2001, she took fourth place in the triple jump at the Commonwealth Youth Games, and set a Scottish junior record for the pole vault. She set three Scottish senior records in the pole vault in two months in 2002, and was selected to represent Scotland in that event at the 2002 Commonwealth Games in Manchester.

In 2003, she also began competing in the long jump, and took the silver medal at the AAA championships. She began concentrating on the long jump in 2004, earning GB selection in that event in 2005. She represented Scotland in the long jump at the 2006 Commonwealth Games in Melbourne, finishing eleventh. She also topped the Scottish 100 m sprint rankings and British 60 metres rankings.

Following a foot injury which delayed her track and field training, Cooke joined driver Nicola Minichiello in the two-woman bobsleigh as brakewoman following a trial in October 2008. Minichiello and Cooke won the gold medal in the two-woman event at the FIBT World Championships 2009 in Lake Placid, New York. The pair finished seventh at the same event in St Moritz in 2010, despite some difficulty with Cooke's prototype racing suit, which split open in the seat, seconds before the start of her bobsleigh run. At the 2010 Winter Olympics, they crashed out during the third run of the two-woman event and did not start the final run as a result.

Following Minichiello's retirement from the sport, Cooke became brakewoman for Paula Walker, Minichiello's successor as British no. 1 driver. Rebekah Wilson replaced Cooke as Walker's partner and took the GBR1 slot for Sochi in 2014. Following her non-selection Cooke retired from bobsleigh and returned to athletics, attempting to obtain selection for the Scottish team in the long jump at the 2014 Commonwealth Games in Glasgow. However, she did not make the squad after she achieved the qualifying standard once, rather than twice as required, although her second longest jump was only 3 cm short of the standard.
