= Dmitry Stepushkin =

Russian bobsledder (1975–2022)

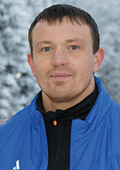

Personal information
- Born: 3 September 1975 Voronezh, Russian SFSR, Soviet Union
- Died: 30 June 2022 (aged 46) Moscow, Russia
Medal record
Bobsleigh
Representing Russia
World Championships
Silver medal – second place	2005 Calgary	Four-man
Silver medal – second place	2008 Altenberg	Four-man
Bronze medal – third place	2003 Lake Placid	Four-man

Dmitry Fyodorovich Stepushkin (Russian: Дмитрий Фёдорович Стёпушкин; 3 September 1975 – 30 June 2022) was a Russian bobsledder who competed from 2000. He won three medals in the four-man event at the FIBT World Championships with two silvers (2005, 2008) and a bronze (2003).

Stepushkin also competed in three Winter Olympics, earning his best finish of ninth in the four-man event twice (2006, 2010 – tie).

Stepushkin died on 30 June 2022, at the age of 46.
