= Roman Oreshnikov =

Russian bobsledder

Medal record

Bobsleigh

World Championships
Silver medal – second place	2008 Altenberg	Four-man

Roman Oreshnikov (Russian: Роман Александрович Орешников; born 6 February 1983 in Kerch, Ukrainian SSR) is a Russian bobsledder who has competed since 2002. He won the silver medal in the four-man event at the 2008 FIBT World Championships in Altenberg, Germany.

Oreshinikov also competed in two Winter Olympics, earning his best finish of tied for ninth in the four-man event at Vancouver in 2010.
