= January 2011 in sports =

<<	January 2011					>>
Su	Mo	Tu	We	Th	Fr	Sa
						1
2	3	4	5	6	7	8
9	10	11	12	13	14	15
16	17	18	19	20	21	22
23	24	25	26	27	28	29
30	31
Sports

This list shows notable sports-related deaths, events, and notable outcomes that occurred in January 2011.

== Deaths in January ==
- 8: Thorbjørn Svenssen
- 15: Nat Lofthouse
- 20: Miesque

== Sporting seasons ==
=== American football 2011 ===
- National Football League
  - Playoffs
- NCAA Division I FBS
- NCAA Division I FCS

=== Basketball 2011 ===
- NBA
- NCAA Division I men
- NCAA Division I women
- Euroleague
- EuroLeague Women
- Eurocup
- EuroChallenge
- France
- Germany
- Greece
- Israel
- Italy
- Philippines
  - Philippine Cup
- Russia
- Spain
- Turkey

=== Football (soccer) 2011 ===
National teams competitions

- UEFA Euro 2012 qualifying
- 2012 Africa Cup of Nations qualification

International clubs competitions

- UEFA (Europe) Champions League
- UEFA Europa League
- UEFA Women's Champions League
- CONCACAF (North & Central America) Champions League
- OFC (Oceania) Champions League

Domestic (national) competitions

- Australia
- England
- France
- Germany
- Iran
- Italy
- Scotland
- Spain

=== Golf 2011 ===
- PGA Tour
- European Tour
- Champions Tour

=== Ice hockey 2011 ===
- National Hockey League
- Kontinental Hockey League
- Czech Extraliga
- Elitserien
- Canadian Hockey League:
  - OHL, QMJHL, WHL
- NCAA Division I men
- NCAA Division I women

=== Rugby union 2011 ===
- Heineken Cup
- European Challenge Cup
- English Premiership
- Celtic League
- LV Cup
- Top 14
- Sevens World Series

=== Snooker 2011 ===
- Players Tour Championship

=== Volleyball 2011 ===
International clubs competitions

- Men's CEV Champions League
- Women's CEV Champions League

Domestic (national) competitions

- Iranian Men's Super League

=== Winter sports ===
- Alpine Skiing World Cup
- Biathlon World Cup
- Bobsleigh World Cup
- Cross-Country Skiing World Cup
- Freestyle Skiing World Cup
- Luge World Cup
- Nordic Combined World Cup
- Short Track Speed Skating World Cup
- Skeleton World Cup
- Ski Jumping World Cup
- Snowboard World Cup
- Speed Skating World Cup

== Days of the month ==
=== January 31, 2011 (Monday) ===
==== Alpine skiing ====
- Women's World Cup in Sestriere, Italy:
  - Super combined: Cancelled due to heavy snow.

==== Cricket ====
- West Indies in Sri Lanka:
  - 1st ODI in Colombo: West Indies 245/5 (50 overs; Adrian Barath 113); Sri Lanka. **No result; 3-match series tied 0–0.**

==== Football (soccer) ====
- South American Youth Championship in Peru:
  - Final Group:
    - Uruguay 1–0 Colombia
    - Argentina 0–1 Ecuador
    - Chile 1–5 Brazil

=== January 30, 2011 (Sunday) ===
==== Alpine skiing ====
- Men's World Cup in Chamonix, France:
  - Super combined: (gold) Ivica Kostelić (CRO) 2:57.12 (2:02.47 / 54.65) (silver) Natko Zrnčić-Dim (CRO) 2:57.63 (2:01.04 / 56.59) (bronze) Aksel Lund Svindal (NOR) 2:57.65 (2:00.05 / 57.60)
    - Combined standings (after 3 of 4 races): (1) Kostelić 300 points (2) Silvan Zurbriggen (SUI) 143 (3) Kjetil Jansrud (NOR) 132
      - Kostelić wins his first combined title.
    - Overall standings (after 25 of 38 races): (1) Kostelić 1178 points (2) Zurbriggen 703 (3) Didier Cuche (SUI) 673
- Women's World Cup in Sestriere, Italy:
  - Downhill: Cancelled due to heavy snow.

==== American football ====
- Pro Bowl in Honolulu, Hawaii:
  - NFC 55, AFC 41

==== Auto racing ====
- Sports cars endurance racing:
  - 24 Hours of Daytona in Daytona Beach, Florida, United States:
    - (1) Joey Hand (USA), Scott Pruett (USA), Graham Rahal (USA) and Memo Rojas (MEX) (Chip Ganassi Racing Riley Mk. XI-BMW) 721 laps
    - (2) Scott Dixon (NZL), Dario Franchitti (GBR), Jamie McMurray (USA) and Juan Pablo Montoya (COL) (Chip Ganassi Racing Riley Mk. XI-BMW) 721 laps
    - (3) João Barbosa (POR), Terry Borcheller (USA), Christian Fittipaldi (BRA), J. C. France (USA) and Max Papis (ITA) (Action Express Racing Riley Mk. XI-Porsche) 721 laps

==== Badminton ====
- BWF Super Series:
  - Korea Open Super Series Premier in Seoul:
    - Men's singles: **Lin Dan** (CHN) def. Lee Chong Wei (MAS) 21–19, 14–21, 21–16
    - Women's singles: **Wang Yihan** (CHN) def. Wang Shixian (CHN) 21–14, 21–18
    - Men's doubles: **Jung Jae-sung** (KOR)/**Lee Yong-dae** (KOR) def. Mathias Boe (DEN)/Carsten Mogensen (DEN) 21–6, 21–13
    - Women's doubles: **Wang Xiaoli** (CHN)/**Yu Yang** (CHN) def. Tian Qing (CHN)/Zhao Yunlei (CHN) 21–18, 19–21, 21–4
    - Mixed doubles: **Zhang Nan** (CHN)/**Zhao Yunlei** (CHN) def. Tao Jiaming/Tian Qing (CHN) 21–17, 13–21, 21–19

==== Basketball ====
- PBA Philippine Cup finals (best-of-7 series):
  - Game 4 in Quezon City: San Miguel Beermen 91, Talk 'N Text Tropang Texters 87. Series tied 2–2.

==== Bobsleigh ====
- World Cup in St. Moritz, Switzerland:
  - Four-man: (gold) Edgars Maskalāns/Daumants Dreiškens/Ugis Zalims/Intars Dambis (LAT) 2:09.34 (1:05.11 / 1:04.23) (silver) Beat Hefti/Roman Handschin/Thomas Lamparter/Manuel Lüthi (SUI) 2:09.36 (1:04.93 / 1:04.43) (bronze) Manuel Machata/Richard Adjei/Andreas Bredau/Christian Poser (GER) 2:09.50 (1:05.04 / 1:04.46)
    - Standings (after 7 of 8 races): (1) Machata 1461 points (2) Steve Holcomb (USA) 1346 (3) Karl Angerer (GER) 1266

==== Cricket ====
- England in Australia:
  - 5th ODI in Brisbane: Australia 249 (49.3 overs; Chris Woakes 6/45); England 198 (45.3 overs). **Australia win by 51 runs; lead 7-match series 4–1.**

==== Equestrianism ====
- Show jumping:
  - FEI World Cup Western European League:
    - 9th competition in Zürich (CSI 5*-W): (gold) Marcus Ehning (GER) on Küchengirl (silver) Ben Maher (GBR) on Robin Hood W (bronze) Edwina Alexander (AUS) on Itot du Château
      - Standings (after 9 of 13 competitions): (1) Kevin Staut (FRA) 87 points (2) Meredith Michaels-Beerbaum (GER) 62 (3) Rolf-Göran Bengtsson (SWE) 58

==== Extreme sport ====
- Winter X Games XV in Aspen, United States:
  - Men's:
    - Skier X: (gold) John Teller (USA) 1:21.167 (silver) Christopher Del Bosco (CAN) 1:21.197 (bronze) Casey Puckett (USA) 1:21.979
    - SnoCross Adaptive: (gold) Mike Schultz (USA) 5:11.704 (silver) Jeff Tweet (USA) 5:53.741 (bronze) Jim Wazny (USA) 5:55.078
    - SnoCross: (gold) Tucker Hibbert (USA) (silver) Ross Martin (USA) (bronze) Robbie Malinoski (CAN)
    - Snowboard Slopestyle: (gold) Sebastien Toutant (CAN) 93.00 points (silver) Mark McMorris (CAN) 90.00 (bronze) Tyler Flanagan (USA) 82.66
    - Mono Skier X: (gold) Josh Dueck (CAN) 1:59.656 (silver) Brandon Adam (USA) 2:10.471 (bronze) Sean Rose (GBR) 2:18.684
    - Snowmobile Best Trick: (gold) Daniel Bodin (SWE) 96.00 points (silver) Caleb Moore (USA) 90.33 (bronze) Heath Frisby (USA) 86.00
    - Snowboard SuperPipe: (gold) Shaun White (USA) 97.33 points (silver) Scotty Lago (USA) 92.00 (bronze) Louie Vito (USA) 87.33
      - White wins the gold for the fourth successive year, and the sixth time overall.
  - Women's:
    - Snowboard Slopestyle: (gold) Enni Rukajärvi (FIN) 92.66 points (silver) Jenny Jones (GBR) 89.33 (bronze) Jamie Anderson (USA) 86.00
    - Skier X: (gold) Kelsey Serwa (CAN) 1:28.830 (silver) Ophélie David (FRA) 1:29.162 (bronze) Fanny Smith (SUI) 1:29.367
      - David fails to win the event for the first time since 2006.

==== Golf ====
- PGA Tour:
  - Farmers Insurance Open in La Jolla, California:
    - Winner: Bubba Watson (USA) 272 (−16)
      - Watson wins his second PGA Tour title.
- European Tour:
  - Volvo Golf Champions in Bahrain:
    - Winner: Paul Casey (ENG) 268 (−20)
      - Casey wins his eleventh European Tour title.

==== Handball ====
- World Men's Championship in Sweden:
  - Third place match: Sweden 23–24 (bronze) **Spain**
  - Final: (gold) **France** 37–35 (ET) (silver) Denmark
    - France defend their title, and win the championship for a record-equalling fourth time. They also qualify for the 2012 Olympic tournament.

==== Ice hockey ====
- NHL All-Star Game in Raleigh, North Carolina:
  - Team Lidström 11, Team Staal 10

==== Luge ====
- FIL World Natural Track Championships in Umhausen, Austria:
  - Men's singles: (gold) Gerald Kammerlander (AUT) 3:37.61 (1:12.46 / 1:12.48 / 1:12.67) (silver) Robert Batkowski (AUT) 3:37.65 (1:12.97 / 1:12.12 / 1:12.56) (bronze) Patrick Pigneter (ITA) 3:37.95 (1:12.72 / 1:11.99 / 1:13.24)
    - Kammerlander wins his first world title.
  - Women's singles: (gold) Renate Gietl (ITA) 3:40.43 (1:13.48 / 1:13.61 / 1:13.34) (silver) Yekaterina Lavrentyeva (RUS) 3:40.67 (1:13.43 / 1:13.90 / 1:13.34) (bronze) Melanie Schwarz (ITA) 3:43.31 (1:14.50 / 1:14.62 / 1:14.19)
    - Gietl wins her second consecutive world title.
- FIL World Championships in Cesana, Italy:
  - Men's doubles: (gold) Andreas Linger/Wolfgang Linger (AUT) 1:33.280 (46.668 / 46.612) (silver) Christian Oberstolz/Patrick Gruber (ITA) 1:33.512 (46.752 / 46.760) (bronze) Andris Šics/Juris Šics (LAT) 1:33.728 (46.909 / 46.719)
    - The Lingers win their second world title.
  - Mixed team relay: Cancelled due to technical difficulties.

==== Ski jumping ====
- World Cup in Willingen, Germany:
  - HS 145: (gold) Severin Freund (GER) 289.1 points (silver) Martin Koch (AUT) 286.9 (bronze) Simon Ammann (SUI) 284.5
    - Standings (after 19 of 26 events): (1) Thomas Morgenstern (AUT) 1434 points (2) Ammann 1013 (3) Andreas Kofler (AUT) 930

==== Snooker ====
- Shoot-Out in Blackpool, England:
  - Final: **Nigel Bond** (ENG) 58–24 Robert Milkins (ENG)
    - Bond wins his fifth professional title.

==== Speed skating ====
- World Cup 6 in Moscow, Russia:
  - Men's:
    - 1000m: (gold) Stefan Groothuis (NED) 1:08.82 (silver) Denny Morrison (CAN) 1:09.57 (bronze) Mikael Flygind Larsen (NOR) 1:09.65
      - Standings (after 7 of 8 races): (1) Groothuis 430 points (2) Lee Kyou-hyuk (KOR) 402 (3) Shani Davis (USA) 380
    - Team Pursuit: (gold) Russia 3:43.71 (silver) Norway 3:46.68 (bronze) Germany 3:47.15
      - Final standings: (1) Norway 270 points (2) Russia 250 (3) United States 232
  - Women's:
    - 1000m: (gold) Christine Nesbitt (CAN) 1:15.59 (silver) Ireen Wüst (NED) 1:15.94 (bronze) Heather Richardson (USA) 1:16.18
      - Standings (after 7 of 8 races): (1) Richardson 560 points (2) Nesbitt 500 (3) Nao Kodaira (JPN) 339
    - Team Pursuit: (gold) Netherlands 3:01.13 (silver) Norway 3:03.02 (bronze) Germany 3:04.11
      - Final standings: (1) Netherlands 300 points (2) Germany & Norway 250

==== Tennis ====
- Australian Open in Melbourne, Australia, day 14:
  - Men's singles – final: **Novak Djokovic** (SRB) [3] vs. Andy Murray (GBR) [5] 6–4, 6–2, 6–3
    - Djokovic wins his second Australian Open and Grand Slam singles title.
  - Mixed doubles – final: **Katarina Srebotnik** (SLO)/**Daniel Nestor** (CAN) def. Chan Yung-jan (TPE)/Paul Hanley (AUS) 6–3, 3–6, [10–7]
    - Srebotnik and Nestor win their first Grand Slam title together. Srebotnik wins her first Australian Open, and her fifth Grand Slam mixed doubles title. Nestor wins his second Australian Open and Grand Slam mixed doubles title.

=== January 29, 2011 (Saturday) ===
==== Alpine skiing ====
- Men's World Cup in Chamonix, France:
  - Downhill: (gold) Didier Cuche (SUI) 1:58.91 (silver) Dominik Paris (ITA) 1:59.58 (bronze) Klaus Kröll (AUT) 1:59.79
    - Downhill standings (after 6 of 9 races): (1) Cuche 379 points (2) Michael Walchhofer (AUT) 314 (3) Silvan Zurbriggen (SUI) 285
    - Overall standings (after 24 of 38 races): (1) Ivica Kostelić (CRO) 1078 points (2) Cuche 673 (3) Zurbriggen 658
- Women's World Cup in Sestriere, Italy:
  - Downhill: Cancelled due to fog.

==== Bobsleigh ====
- World Cup in St. Moritz, Switzerland:
  - Two-man: (gold) Manuel Machata/Andreas Bredau (GER) 2:12.27 (1:06.36 / 1:05.91) (silver) Beat Hefti/Thomas Lamparter (SUI) 2:12.30 (1:06.42 / 1:05.88) (bronze) Thomas Florschütz/Kevin Kuske (GER) 2:12.66 (1:06.58 / 1:06.08)
    - Standings (after 7 of 8 races): (1) Alexandr Zubkov (RUS) 1430 points (2) Machata 1412 (3) Simone Bertazzo (ITA) 1251
  - Two-women: (gold) Sandra Kiriasis/Berit Wiacker (GER) 2:14.89 (1:07.57 / 1:07.32) (silver) Anja Schneiderheinze-Stöckel/Christin Senkel (GER) 2:15.17 (1:07.76 / 1:07.41) (bronze) Cathleen Martini/Romy Logsch (GER) 2:15.54 (1:07.71 / 1:07.83)
    - Standings (after 7 of 8 races): (1) Kiriasis 1511 points (2) Martini 1387 (3) Kaillie Humphries (CAN) 1216

==== Cricket ====
- Pakistan in New Zealand:
  - 3rd ODI in Christchurch: Pakistan 293/7 (50 overs; Mohammad Hafeez 115); New Zealand 250/9 (50 overs). **Pakistan win by 43 runs; 6-match series tied 1–1.**

==== Extreme sport ====
- Winter X Games XV in Aspen, United States:
  - Men's:
    - Snowboarder-X: (gold) Nick Baumgartner (USA) 1:29.700 (silver) Kevin Hill (CAN) 1:29.856 (bronze) Nate Holland (USA) 1:30.026
      - Holland fails to win the event for the first time since 2005.
    - Slopestyle skiing: (gold) Sammy Carlson (USA) 93.33 points (silver) Russ Henshaw (AUS) 90.66 (bronze) Andreas Håtveit (NOR) 90.00
    - Snowboard Street: (gold) Nic Sauve (CAN) 85 points (silver) Louis-Felix Paradis (CAN) 68 (bronze) Simon Chamberlain (CAN) 64
    - Skiing Big Air: (gold) Alex Schlopy (USA) 92 points (silver) Bobby Brown (USA) 89 (bronze) Sammy Carlson (USA) 87
      - Schlopy wins the event for the second successive year.
  - Women's:
    - Snowboarder-X: (gold) Lindsey Jacobellis (USA) 1:38.943 (silver) Callan Chythlook-Sifsof (USA) 1:39.681 (bronze) Déborah Anthonioz (FRA) 1:40.026
      - Jacobellis wins for the fourth consecutive year, and the seventh time in nine years.
    - Snowboard SuperPipe: (gold) Kelly Clark (USA) 92.33 points (silver) Kaitlyn Farrington (USA) 85.66 (bronze) Elena Hight (USA) 80.00
      - Clark wins the event for the second time.

==== Figure skating ====
- European Championships in Bern, Switzerland:
  - Ladies: (gold) Sarah Meier (SUI) 170.60 points (silver) Carolina Kostner (ITA) 168.54 (bronze) Kiira Korpi (FIN) 166.40
    - Meier becomes the first Swiss woman to win the championship since Denise Biellmann in 1981.
  - Men: (gold) Florent Amodio (FRA) 226.86 points (silver) Brian Joubert (FRA) 223.01 (bronze) Tomáš Verner (CZE) 222.60
    - Amodio wins the title for the first time. He and Joubert become the first French pair since Alain Giletti and Alain Calmat in 1961 to finish in the top two places.

==== Football (soccer) ====
- AFC Asian Cup in Qatar:
  - Final: (silver) Australia 0–1 (a.e.t.) (gold) **Japan**
    - Japan win the Cup for a record fourth time.

==== Freestyle skiing ====
- World Cup in Grasgehren, Germany:
  - Men's Ski Cross: (gold) Andreas Matt (AUT) (silver) Patrick Koller (AUT) (bronze) Armin Niederer (SUI)
    - Ski Cross standings (after 6 of 11 events): (1) Matt 419 points (2) Christopher Del Bosco (CAN) 225 (3) Alex Fiva (SUI) 199
  - Women's Ski Cross: (gold) Anna Holmlund (SWE) (silver) Heidi Zacher (GER) (bronze) Katrin Müller (SUI)
    - Ski Cross standings (after 6 of 11 events): (1) Zacher 376 points (2) Holmlund 332 (3) Kelsey Serwa (CAN) 329
- World Cup in Calgary, Canada:
  - Men's Moguls: (gold) Mikaël Kingsbury (CAN) 24.25 points (silver) Alexandre Bilodeau (CAN) 24.16 (bronze) Alexandr Smyshlyaev (RUS) 23.53
    - Moguls standings (after 7 of 11 events): (1) Guilbaut Colas (FRA) 536 points (2) Kingsbury 455 (3) Bilodeau 379
  - Women's Moguls: (gold) Hannah Kearney (USA) 24.43 points (silver) Audrey Robichaud (CAN) 22.71 (bronze) Ekaterina Stolyarova (RUS) 22.59
    - Moguls standings (after 7 of 11 events): (1) Kearney 609 points (2) Jennifer Heil (CAN) 412 (3) Robichaud 300
  - Men's Aerials: (gold) Warren Shouldice (CAN) 244.90 points (silver) Renato Ulrich (SUI) 243.01 (bronze) Scotty Bahrke (USA) 229.57
    - Aerials standings (after 5 of 8 events): (1) Qi Guangpu (CHN) 361 points (2) Jia Zongyang (CHN) 238 (3) Ulrich 231
    - Overall standings: (1) Guilbaut Colas (FRA) 77 points (2) Qi 72 (3) Andreas Matt (AUT) 70
  - Women's Aerials: (gold) Cheng Shuang (CHN) 187.23 points (silver) Xu Mengtao (CHN) 186.65 (bronze) Olha Volkova (UKR) 175.40
    - Aerials standings (after 5 of 8 events): (1) Xu 420 points (2) Cheng 316 (3) Volkova 213
    - Overall standings: (1) Hannah Kearney (USA) 87 points (2) Xu 84 (3) Cheng & Heidi Zacher (GER) 63

==== Luge ====
- FIL World Natural Track Championships in Umhausen, Austria:
  - Men's doubles: (gold) Pavel Porzhnev/Ivan Lazarev (RUS) 2:33.24 (1:16.71 / 1:16.53) (silver) Patrick Pigneter/Florian Clara (ITA) 2:33.90 (1:17.56 / 1:16.34) (bronze) Andrzej Laszczak/Damian Waniczek (POL) 2:35.26 (1:17.99 / 1:17.27)
    - Porzhnev and Lazarev win their third world title.
- FIL World Championships in Cesana, Italy:
  - Men's singles: (gold) Armin Zöggeler (ITA) 1:43.538 (51.568 / 51.970) (silver) Felix Loch (GER) 1:43.559 (51.511 / 52.048) (bronze) Andi Langenhan (GER) 1:44.013 (51.827 / 52.186)
    - Zöggeler wins his sixth world title.
  - Women's singles: (gold) Tatjana Hüfner (GER) 1:33.969 (46.976 / 46.993) (silver) Natalie Geisenberger (GER) 1:34.243 (47.027 / 47.216) (bronze) Alex Gough (CAN) 1:34.413 (47.051 / 47.362)
    - Hüfner wins her third world title. Gough wins the first ever world championship medal for women from Canada.

==== Mixed martial arts ====
- Strikeforce: Diaz vs. Cyborg in San Jose, California, United States:
  - Light Heavyweight bout: **Roger Gracie** (BRA) def. Trevor Prangley (RSA) by submission (rear naked choke)
  - Heavyweight bout: **Herschel Walker** (USA) def. Scott Carson (USA) by TKO (strikes)
  - Middleweight Championship bout: **Ronaldo Souza** (BRA) (c) def. Robbie Lawler (USA) by submission (rear naked choke)
  - Welterweight Championship bout: **Nick Diaz** (USA) (c) def. Evangelista Santos (BRA) by submission (armbar)

==== Ski jumping ====
- World Cup in Willingen, Germany:
  - HS 145 Team: (gold) Austria (Gregor Schlierenzauer, Martin Koch, Andreas Kofler, Thomas Morgenstern) 1071.8 points (silver) Germany (Michael Uhrmann, Martin Schmitt, Michael Neumayer, Severin Freund) 1025.1 (bronze) Poland (Kamil Stoch, Piotr Żyła, Stefan Hula, Adam Małysz) 1015.7

==== Speed skating ====
- World Cup 6 in Moscow, Russia:
  - Men's:
    - 500m: (gold) Jan Smeekens (NED) 34.93 (silver) Akio Ota (JPN) 35.02 (bronze) Tucker Fredricks (USA) 35.06
      - Standings (after 10 of 12 races): (1) Joji Kato (JPN) 615 points (2) Lee Kang-seok (KOR) 590 (3) Fredricks 540
    - 5000m: (gold) Bob de Jong (NED) 6:19.43 (silver) Ivan Skobrev (RUS) 6:21.16 (bronze) Håvard Bøkko (NOR) 6:22.79
      - Standings (after 4 of 6 races): (1) de Jong 360 points (2) Skobrev 280 (3) Bøkko 236
  - Women's:
    - 500m: (gold) Jenny Wolf (GER) 38.01 (silver) Margot Boer (NED) 38.49 (bronze) Heather Richardson (USA) 38.53(3)
      - Standings (after 10 of 12 races): (1) Wolf 920 points (2) Lee Sang-hwa (KOR) 650 (3) Boer 570
    - 1500m: (gold) Christine Nesbitt (CAN) 1:56.80 (silver) Ireen Wüst (NED) 1:56.93 (bronze) Martina Sáblíková (CZE) 1:57.50
      - Standings (after 4 of 6 races): (1) Nesbitt 400 points (2) Marrit Leenstra (NED) 246 (3) Wüst 230

==== Tennis ====
- Australian Open in Melbourne, Australia, day 13:
  - Women's singles – final: **Kim Clijsters** (BEL) def. Li Na (CHN) 3–6, 6–3, 6–3
    - Clijsters wins her first Australian Open title, and her fourth Grand Slam singles title.
  - Men's doubles – final: **Bob Bryan** (USA) / **Mike Bryan** (USA) def. Mahesh Bhupathi (IND) / Leander Paes (IND) 6–3, 6–4
    - The Bryans win the Australian Open men's doubles title for the third consecutive time and fifth time in six years, and their 10th Grand Slam men's doubles title.
  - Boys' Singles – final: **Jiří Veselý** (CZE) def. Luke Saville (AUS) 6–0, 6–3
  - Girls' Singles – final: **An-Sophie Mestach** (BEL) def. Monica Puig (PUR) 6–4, 6–2
  - Wheelchair men's singles – final: **Shingo Kunieda** (JPN) def. Stéphane Houdet (FRA) 6–0, 6–3
    - Kuneida wins his fifth successive Australian Open title, the seventh successive Grand Slam title and the 12th Grand Slam title overall.
  - Wheelchair women's singles – final: **Esther Vergeer** (NED) def. Daniela Di Toro (AUS) 6–0, 6–0
    - Vergeer maintains her unbeaten record in Grand Slam singles tournaments, as she wins her eighth Australian Open title and 17th Grand Slam title.
  - Wheelchair quad singles – final: **David Wagner** (USA) def. Peter Norfolk (GBR) 6–2, 6–3

=== January 28, 2011 (Friday) ===
==== Basketball ====
- PBA Philippine Cup finals (best-of-7 series):
  - Game 3 in Quezon City: San Miguel Beermen 103, Talk 'N Text Tropang Texters 82. Talk 'N Text lead series 2–1.

==== Extreme sport ====
- Winter X Games XV in Aspen, United States:
  - Men's SuperPipe skiing: (gold) Kevin Rolland (FRA) 93.66 points (silver) Torin Yater-Wallace (USA) 92.66 (bronze) Simon Dumont (USA) 90.33
    - Rolland wins the event for the second successive year.
  - Men's Snowboard best method: (gold) Scotty Lago (USA) (silver) Ross Powers (USA) (bronze) Chas Guldemond (USA)
  - Men's Snowmobile Speed & Style: (gold) Joe Parsons (USA) 93.59 points (silver) Heath Frisby (USA) 89.66 (bronze) Cory Davis (USA) 100.48
  - Men's Snowboard big air: (gold) Torstein Horgmo (NOR) 80 points (silver) Sebastien Toutant (CAN) 79 (bronze) Sage Kotsenburg (USA) 77

==== Figure skating ====
- European Championships in Bern, Switzerland:
  - Ladies short program: (1) Kiira Korpi (FIN) 63.50 points (2) Ksenia Makarova (RUS) 60.35 (3) Sarah Meier (SUI) 58.56
  - Ice dancing: (gold) Nathalie Péchalat/Fabian Bourzat (FRA) 167.40 points (silver) Ekaterina Bobrova/Dmitri Soloviev (RUS) 161.14 (bronze) Sinead Kerr/John Kerr (GBR) 157.49
    - Péchalat/Bourzat become the first ice dancing champions since Jayne Torvill and Christopher Dean in 1981 who didn't win any medal at previous championships.

==== Football (soccer) ====
- AFC Asian Cup in Qatar:
  - Third place match: Uzbekistan 2–3 (bronze) **South Korea**
- South American Youth Championship in Peru:
  - Group B: (teams in **bold** advance to second round)
    - **Ecuador** 3–1 Bolivia
    - **Colombia** 3–3 Paraguay
      - Final standings: **Brazil** 10 points, Ecuador 7, Colombia 5, Paraguay 4, Bolivia 1.

==== Handball ====
- World Men's Championship in Sweden:
  - 7th place match: **Hungary** 31–28 Poland
  - 5th place match: Iceland 33–34 **Croatia**
  - Semifinals:
    - **France** 29–26 Sweden
    - **Denmark** 28–24 Spain

==== Luge ====
- FIL World Natural Track Championships in Umhausen, Austria:
  - Mixed team: (gold) Italy I (Renate Gietl, Anton Blasbichler, Patrick Pigneter/Florian Clara) 79 points (silver) Austria I (Melanie Batkowski, Gerald Kammerlander, Christian Schatz/Gerhard Mühlbacher) 72 (bronze) Russia I (Yekaterina Lavrentyeva, Juri Talikh, Pavel Porzhnev/Ivan Lazarev) 71

==== Skeleton ====
- World Cup in St. Moritz, Switzerland:
  - Men: (gold) Martins Dukurs (LAT) 2:16.54 (1:08.63 / 1:07.91) (silver) Frank Rommel (GER) 2:16.89 (1:08.58 / 1:08.31) (bronze) Ben Sandford (NZL) 2:17.34 (1:08.66 / 1:08.68)
    - Standings (after 7 of 8 events): (1) Dukurs 1494 points (2) Sandro Stielicke (GER) 1266 (3) Rommel 1218
      - Dukurs secures the title for the second successive year with his fourth win of the season.
  - Women: (gold) Shelley Rudman (GBR) 2:19.17 (1:09.76 / 1:09.41) (silver) Mellisa Hollingsworth (CAN) 2:19.41 (1:09.85 / 1:09.56) (bronze) Anja Huber (GER) 2:19.43 (1:10.00 / 1:09.43)
    - Standings (after 7 of 8 events): (1) Huber 1485 points (2) Rudman 1474 (3) Hollingsworth 1364

==== Speed skating ====
- World Cup 6 in Moscow, Russia:
  - Men's:
    - 500m: (gold) Pekka Koskela (FIN) 35.15 (silver) Jamie Gregg (CAN) 35.23 (bronze) Jacques de Koning (NED) 35.24
      - Standings (after 9 of 12 races): (1) Joji Kato (JPN) 615 points (2) Lee Kang-seok (KOR) 590 (3) Keiichiro Nagashima (JPN) 488
    - 1500m: (gold) Ivan Skobrev (RUS) 1:45.49 (silver) Denny Morrison (CAN) 1:46.25 (bronze) Mark Tuitert (NED) 1:46.59
      - Standings (after 4 of 6 races): (1) Simon Kuipers (NED) 245 points (2) Håvard Bøkko (NOR) 232 (3) Stefan Groothuis (NED) 222
  - Women's:
    - 500m: (gold) Jenny Wolf (GER) 37.90 (silver) Margot Boer (NED) 38.56 (bronze) Heather Richardson (USA) 38.57
      - Standings (after 9 of 12 races): (1) Wolf 820 points (2) Lee Sang-hwa (KOR) 650 (3) Boer 490
    - 3000m: (gold) Martina Sáblíková (CZE) 4:04.03 (silver) Ireen Wüst (NED) 4:05.41 (bronze) Brittany Schussler (CAN) 4:10.45
      - Standings (after 4 of 6 races): (1) Stephanie Beckert (GER) 275 points (2) Sáblíková 260 (3) Jilleanne Rookard (USA) 236

==== Tennis ====
- Australian Open in Melbourne, Australia, day 12:
  - Men's singles – Semifinal: **Andy Murray** (GBR) def. David Ferrer (ESP) 4–6, 7–6(2), 6–1, 7–6(2)
    - Murray reaches the final for the second successive year, and a Grand Slam final for the third time.
  - Women's doubles – final: **Gisela Dulko** (ARG) / **Flavia Pennetta** (ITA) def. Victoria Azarenka (BLR) / Maria Kirilenko (RUS) 2–6, 7–5, 6–1
    - Dulko and Pennetta both win their first Grand Slam title.
  - Boys' Doubles – final: **Filip Horanský** (SVK) / **Jiří Veselý** (CZE) def. Ben Wagland (AUS) / Andrew Whittington (AUS) 6–4, 6–4
  - Girls' Doubles – final: **An-Sophie Mestach** (BEL) / **Demi Schuurs** (NED) def. Eri Hozumi (JPN) / Miyu Kato (JPN) 6–2, 6–3
  - Wheelchair men's doubles – final: **Maikel Scheffers** (NED) / **Shingo Kunieda** (JPN) def. Stéphane Houdet (FRA) / Nicolas Peifer (FRA) 6–3, 6–3
  - Wheelchair women's doubles – final: **Esther Vergeer** (NED) / **Sharon Walraven** (NED) def. Aniek van Koot (NED) / Jiske Griffioen (NED) 6–0, 6–2

=== January 27, 2011 (Thursday) ===
==== American football ====
- NFL news: The Tennessee Titans and their head coach Jeff Fisher, the longest-tenured coach in the league, part ways. He had been in the post since 1994, when the franchise was known as the Houston Oilers.

==== Basketball ====
- Euroleague Top 16, matchday 2:
  - Group E: Panathinaikos Athens (Greece) 82–56 (Spain) Unicaja Málaga
    - Standings (after 2 games): Panathinaikos Athens 2–0; (Lithuania) Lietuvos Rytas, (Spain) Caja Laboral 1–1; Unicaja Málaga 0–2.
  - Group F:
    - Maccabi Tel Aviv (Israel) 99–58 (Italy) Virtus Roma
    - Union Olimpija Ljubljana (Slovenia) 67–68 (Spain) Regal FC Barcelona
      - Standings (after 2 games): Regal FC Barcelona 2–0; Maccabi Tel Aviv, Union Olimpija Ljubljana 1–1; Virtus Roma 0–2.
  - Group H: Fenerbahçe Ülker (Turkey) 75–73 (Spain) Power Electronics Valencia
    - Standings (after 2 games): Fenerbahçe Ülker 2–0; Power Electronics Valencia, (Greece) Olympiacos Piraeus 1–1; (Lithuania) Žalgiris Kaunas 0–2.

==== Extreme sport ====
- Winter X Games XV in Aspen, United States:
  - Women's Slopestyle skiing: (gold) Kaya Turski (CAN) 93.66 points (silver) Keri Herman (USA) 93.33 (bronze) Grete Eliassen (NOR) 93.00
    - Turski wins the gold for the second successive year.
  - Men's Snowmobile freestyle: (gold) Daniel Bodin (SWE) 91.33 points (silver) Justin Hoyer (USA) 91.00 (bronze) Caleb Moore (USA) 90.00
  - Women's SuperPipe skiing: (gold) Sarah Burke (CAN) 91.33 points (silver) Brita Sigourney (USA) 86.00 (bronze) Rosalind Groenewoud (CAN) 84.00
    - Burke wins her fourth SuperPipe gold in five years.

==== Figure skating ====
- European Championships in Bern, Switzerland:
  - Men short program: (1) Florent Amodio (FRA) 78.11 points (2) Michal Březina (CZE) 76.13 (3) Artur Gachinski (RUS) 73.76
  - Pairs: (gold) Aliona Savchenko/Robin Szolkowy (GER) 206.20 points (silver) Yuko Kavaguti/Alexander Smirnov (RUS) 203.61 (bronze) Vera Bazarova/Yuri Larionov (RUS) 188.24
    - Savchenko and Szolkowy win their fourth title in five years.

==== Football (soccer) ====
- South American Youth Championship in Peru: (teams in **bold** advance to second round)
  - Group A:
    - **Chile** 3–1 Venezuela
    - Peru 2–0 **Uruguay**
      - Final standings: **Argentina** 10 points, Chile 6, Uruguay, Peru 4, Venezuela 3.
- Copa Libertadores First Stage, first leg:
  - Cerro Porteño (Paraguay) 1–0 (Venezuela) Deportivo Petare
  - Bolívar (Bolivia) 0–1 (Chile) Unión Española

==== Handball ====
- World Men's Championship in Sweden:
  - 11th place match: **Germany** 40–35 (ET) Argentina
  - 9th place match: **Norway** 32–31 (ET) Serbia

==== Snooker ====
- Championship League Group 4:
  - Final: Mark Allen (NIR) 1–3 **Ali Carter** (ENG)
    - Carter advances to the winners group.

==== Tennis ====
- Australian Open in Melbourne, Australia, day 11:
  - Men's singles – Semifinal: **Novak Djokovic** (SRB) [3] def. Roger Federer (SUI) [2] 7–6(3), 7–5, 6–4
    - Djokovic reaches the Australian Open final for the second time, and a Grand Slam final for the fourth time.
  - Women's singles – Semifinals:
    - **Li Na** (CHN) [9] def. Caroline Wozniacki (DEN) [1] 3–6, 7–5, 6–3
      - Li becomes the first Chinese player to reach a Grand Slam singles final.
    - **Kim Clijsters** (BEL) [3] def. Vera Zvonareva (RUS) [2] 6–3, 6–3
      - Clijsters reaches the Australian Open final for the second time, and a Grand Slam final for the eighth time.
  - Wheelchair quad doubles – final: **Andrew Lapthorne** (GBR) / **Peter Norfolk** (GBR) def. Nicholas Taylor (USA) / David Wagner (USA) 6–3, 6–3

=== January 26, 2011 (Wednesday) ===
==== Basketball ====
- Euroleague Top 16, matchday 2:
  - Group E: Caja Laboral (Spain) 86–89 (Lithuania) Lietuvos Rytas
    - Standings: (Greece) Panathinaikos Athens 1–0; Lietuvos Rytas, Caja Laboral 1–1; (Spain) Unicaja Málaga 0–1.
  - Group G:
    - Partizan Belgrade (Serbia) 76–79 (Turkey) Efes Pilsen Istanbul
    - Montepaschi Siena (Italy) 68–78 (Spain) Real Madrid
      - Standings (after 2 games): Real Madrid, Efes Pilsen 2–0; Montepaschi Siena, Partizan Belgrade 0–2.
  - Group H: Žalgiris Kaunas (Lithuania) 64–71 (Greece) Olympiacos Piraeus
    - Standings: (Turkey) Fenerbahçe Ülker, (Spain) Power Electronics Valencia 1–0; Olympiacos Piraeus 1–1; Žalgiris Kaunas 0–2.
- PBA Philippine Cup finals (best-of-7 series):
  - Game 2 in Pasay: Talk 'N Text Tropang Texters 110, San Miguel Beermen 102. Talk 'N Text lead series 2–0.

==== Cricket ====
- England in Australia:
  - 4th ODI in Adelaide: England 299/8 (50 overs; Jonathan Trott 102); Australia 278/7 (50 overs). **England win by 21 runs; Australia lead 7-match series 3–1.**
- Pakistan in New Zealand:
  - 2nd ODI in Queenstown: Pakistan 31/0 (4.2 overs); New Zealand. **Match abandoned; New Zealand lead 6-match series 1–0.**

==== Figure skating ====
- European Championships in Bern, Switzerland:
  - Short dance: (1) Nathalie Péchalat/Fabian Bourzat (FRA) 66.91 points (2) Ekaterina Bobrova/Dmitri Soloviev (RUS) 65.46 (3) Sinead Kerr/John Kerr (GBR) 62.87
  - Pairs short program: (1) Aliona Savchenko/Robin Szolkowy (GER) 72.31 points (2) Yuko Kavaguti/Alexander Smirnov (RUS) 69.49 (3) Vera Bazarova/Yuri Larionov (RUS) 62.89

==== Football (soccer) ====
- Copa Libertadores First Stage, first leg:
  - Corinthians (Brazil) 0–0 (Colombia) Deportes Tolima
  - Liverpool (Uruguay) 2–2 (Brazil) Grêmio
  - Alianza Lima (Peru) 0–2 (Mexico) Jaguares

==== Snowboarding ====
- World Cup in Denver, United States:
  - Big Air: (gold) Rocco van Straten (NED) 27.9 points (silver) Zachary Stone (CAN) 26.5 (bronze) Michael Macho (AUT) 20.7
    - Big Air standings (after 3 of 4 events): (1) Sebastien Toutant (CAN) 1220 points (2) van Straten 1165 (3) Ståle Sandbech (NOR) 1090
    - Overall Freestyle standings: (1) Toutant 1220 points (2) van Straten 1185 (3) Seppe Smits (BEL) 1180

==== Tennis ====
- Australian Open in Melbourne, Australia, day 10:
  - Men's singles – Quarterfinals:
    - **David Ferrer** (ESP) [7] def. Rafael Nadal (ESP) [1] 6–4, 6–2, 6–3
    - **Andy Murray** (GBR) [5] def. Alexandr Dolgopolov (UKR) 7–5, 6–3, 6–7(3), 6–3
  - Women's singles – Quarterfinals:
    - **Vera Zvonareva** (RUS) [2] def. Petra Kvitová (CZE) [25] 6–2, 6–4
    - **Kim Clijsters** (BEL) [3] def. Agnieszka Radwańska (POL) [12] 6–3, 7–6(4)
- News: Former World Number 1 player Justine Henin announces her second retirement from the sport, citing a lingering injury to her right elbow.

=== January 25, 2011 (Tuesday) ===
==== Alpine skiing ====
- Men's World Cup in Schladming, Austria:
  - Slalom: (gold) Jean-Baptiste Grange (FRA) 1:46.54 (54.62 / 51.92) (silver) André Myhrer (SWE) 1:46.58 (53.77 / 52.81) (bronze) Mattias Hargin (SWE) 1:47.14 (54.22 / 52.92)
    - Slalom standings (after 7 of 10 races): (1) Ivica Kostelić (CRO) 478 points (2) Grange 382 (3) Myhrer 333
    - Overall standings (after 23 of 38 races): (1) Kostelić 1075 points (2) Silvan Zurbriggen (SUI) 643 (3) Aksel Lund Svindal (NOR) 585

==== Football (soccer) ====
- AFC Asian Cup in Qatar:
  - Semifinals:
    - **Japan** 2–2 (3–0 pen.) South Korea
    - Uzbekistan 0–6 **Australia**
- South American Youth Championship in Peru: (teams in **bold** advance to second round)
  - Group B:
    - Colombia 2–1 Bolivia
    - Ecuador 0–1 **Brazil**
      - Standings: Brazil 10 points (4 matches), Ecuador, Colombia 4 (3), Paraguay 3 (3), Bolivia 1 (3).
- Copa Libertadores First Stage, first leg:
  - Independiente (Argentina) 2–0 (Ecuador) Deportivo Quito

==== Handball ====
- World Men's Championship in Sweden: (teams in **bold** advance to the semifinals)
  - Group I:
    - Germany 25–35 Norway
    - **Spain** 30–24 Hungary
    - **France** 34–28 Iceland
      - Final standings: France, Spain 9 points, Iceland, Hungary 4, Norway, Germany 2.
  - Group II:
    - Croatia 28–25 Poland
    - Serbia 26–25 Argentina
    - **Denmark** 27–24 **Sweden**
      - Final standings: Denmark 10 points, Sweden 6, Croatia 5, Poland 4, Serbia 3, Argentina 2.

==== Snooker ====
- Championship League Group 3:
  - Final: Mark King (ENG) 2–3 **Shaun Murphy** (ENG)
    - Murphy advances to the winners group.

==== Tennis ====
- Australian Open in Melbourne, Australia, day 9:
  - Men's singles – Quarterfinals:
    - **Roger Federer** (SUI) [2] def. Stanislas Wawrinka (SUI) [19] 6–1, 6–3, 6–3
    - **Novak Djokovic** (SRB) [3] def. Tomáš Berdych (CZE) [6] 6–1, 7–6(5), 6–1
  - Women's singles – Quarterfinals:
    - **Caroline Wozniacki** (DEN) [1] def. Francesca Schiavone (ITA) [6] 3–6, 6–3, 6–3
    - **Li Na** (CHN) [9] def. Andrea Petkovic (GER) [30] 6–2, 6–4

=== January 24, 2011 (Monday) ===
==== Football (soccer) ====
- South American Youth Championship in Peru: (teams in **bold** advance to second round)
  - Group A:
    - Chile 1–3 **Argentina**
    - Peru 1–1 Venezuela
      - Standings: Argentina 10 points (4 matches), Uruguay 4 (3), Venezuela, Chile 3 (3), Peru 1 (3).

==== Handball ====
- World Men's Championship in Sweden:
  - Group I: (teams in **bold** advance to the semifinals)
    - Iceland 24–32 **Spain**
    - Hungary 27–25 Germany
    - Norway 26–31 **France**
      - Standings (after 4 matches): France, Spain 7 points, Iceland, Hungary 4, Germany 2, Norway 0.
  - 15th place match: Japan 24–29 **Algeria**
  - 13th place match: Egypt 23–26 **South Korea**

==== Tennis ====
- Australian Open in Melbourne, Australia, day 8:
  - Men's singles – 4th round:
    - **Rafael Nadal** (ESP) [1] def. Marin Čilić (CRO) [15] 6–2, 6–4, 6–3
    - **Alexandr Dolgopolov** (UKR) def. Robin Söderling (SWE) [4] 1–6, 6–3, 6–1, 4–6, 6–2
    - **Andy Murray** (GBR) [5] def. Jürgen Melzer (AUT) [11] 6–3, 6–1, 6–1
    - **David Ferrer** (ESP) [7] def. Milos Raonic (CAN) 4–6, 6–2, 6–3, 6–4
  - Women's singles – 4th round:
    - **Vera Zvonareva** (RUS) [2] def. Iveta Benešová (CZE) 6–4, 6–1
    - **Kim Clijsters** (BEL) [3] def. Ekaterina Makarova (RUS) 7–6(3), 6–2
    - **Agnieszka Radwańska** (POL) [12] def. Peng Shuai (CHN) 7–5, 3–6, 7–5
    - **Petra Kvitová** (CZE) [25] def. Flavia Pennetta (ITA) [22] 3–6, 6–3, 6–3

=== January 23, 2011 (Sunday) ===
==== Alpine skiing ====
- Men's World Cup in Kitzbühel, Austria:
  - Slalom: (gold) Jean-Baptiste Grange (FRA) 1:40.93 (52.60 / 48.33) (silver) Ivica Kostelić (CRO) 1:41.21 (52.20 / 49.01) (bronze) Giuliano Razzoli (ITA) 1:41.62 (52.79 / 48.83)
    - Slalom standings (after 6 of 10 races): (1) Kostelić 433 points (2) Marcel Hirscher (AUT) 326 (3) Grange 282
  - Combined: (gold) Kostelić 3:40.84 (1:59.63 / 52.20 / 49.01) (silver) Silvan Zurbriggen (SUI) 3:42.77 (1:59.89 / 52.96 / 49.92) (bronze) Romed Baumann (AUT) 3:47.51 (1:59.54 / 55.93 / 52.04)
    - Combined standings (after 2 of 4 races): (1) Kostelić 200 points (2) Carlo Janka (SUI) 112 (3) Zurbriggen 98
    - Overall standings (after 22 of 38 races): (1) Kostelić 1030 points (2) Zurbriggen 629 (3) Aksel Lund Svindal (NOR) 585
- Women's World Cup in Cortina, Italy:
  - Super-G: (gold) Lindsey Vonn (USA) 1:22.64 (silver) Maria Riesch (GER) 1:22.69 (bronze) Lara Gut (SUI) 1:23.52
    - Super G standings (after 4 of 7 races): (1) Vonn 380 points (2) Riesch 229 (3) Gut 205
    - Overall standings (after 21 of 38 races): (1) Riesch 1232 points (2) Vonn 1087 (3) Elisabeth Görgl (AUT) 628

==== American football ====
- NFL playoffs – Conference Championships:
  - NFC: Green Bay Packers 21, Chicago Bears 14
    - The Packers win the NFC Championship Game for the third time.
  - AFC: Pittsburgh Steelers 24, New York Jets 19
    - The Steelers win the AFC Championship Game for the second time in three years, and a record-extending eighth time overall.

==== Badminton ====
- BWF Super Series:
  - Malaysia Super Series in Kuala Lumpur:
    - Men's singles: **Lee Chong Wei** (MAS) def. Taufik Hidayat (INA) 21–8, 21–17
    - Women's singles: **Wang Shixian** (CHN) def. Wang Yihan (CHN) 21–18, 21–14
    - Men's doubles: **Chai Biao** (CHN)/**Guo Zhendong** (CHN) def. Mads-Conrads Petersen (DEN)/Jonas Rasmussen (DEN) 21–16, 21–14
    - Women's doubles: **Tian Qing** (CHN)/**Zhao Yunlei** (CHN) def. Wang Xiaoli (CHN)/Yu Yang (CHN) 21–12, 6–21, 21–17
    - Mixed doubles: **He Hanbin** (CHN)/**Ma Jin** (CHN) def. Tao Jiaming (CHN)/Tian Qing (CHN) 21–13, 13–21, 21–16

==== Biathlon ====
- World Cup 6 in Antholz, Italy:
  - Women's 12.5 km Mass Start: (gold) Tora Berger (NOR) 33:56.3 (0+1+0+1) (silver) Marie-Laure Brunet (FRA) 33:56.9 (0+0+0+1) (bronze) Darya Domracheva (BLR) 34:02.1 (0+0+0+0)
    - Mass start standings (after 2 of 5 races): (1) Brunet 97 points (2) Berger 90 (3) Helena Ekholm (SWE) 85
    - Overall standings (after 14 of 26 races): (1) Kaisa Mäkäräinen (FIN) 574 points (2) Ekholm 546 (3) Andrea Henkel (GER) 523
  - Men's 4 x 7.5 km Relay: (gold) Germany (Christoph Stephan, Daniel Böhm, Arnd Peiffer, Michael Greis) 1:10:17.2 (0+7) (silver) Italy (Christian de Lorenzi, Rene Laurent Vuillermoz, Lukas Hofer, Markus Windisch) 1:10:35.8 (0+9) (bronze) Norway (Emil Hegle Svendsen, Ole Einar Bjørndalen, Alexander Os, Tarjei Bø) 1:10:45.4 (0+8)
    - Standings (after 3 of 4 races): (1) Germany 163 points (2) Norway 156 (3) Austria & France 122

==== Bobsleigh ====
- World Cup and FIBT European Championships in Winterberg, Germany:
  - Four-man: (gold) Manuel Machata/Richard Adjei/Andreas Bredau/Florian Becke (GER) 1:50.15 (55.29 / 54.86) (silver) Thomas Florschütz/Ronny Listner/Kevin Kuske/Andreas Barucha (GER) 1:50.28 (55.10 / 55.18) (silver) Alexandr Zubkov/Filipp Yegorov/Dmitry Trunenkov/Nikolay Hrenkov (RUS) 1:50.28 (55.27 / 55.01)
    - Machata, Adjei, Bredau and Becke all win their first European title.
    - Standings (after 6 of 8 races): (1) Machata 1261 points (2) Steve Holcomb (USA) 1186 (3) Karl Angerer (GER) 1090

==== Bowls ====
- World Indoor Championships in Hopton-on-Sea, England:
  - Final: **Paul Foster** (SCO) def. Alex Marshall (SCO) 11–5, 8–8
    - Foster wins his fourth world title.

==== Cricket ====
- England in Australia:
  - 3rd ODI in Sydney: England 214 (48 overs); Australia 215/6 (46 overs). **Australia win by 4 wickets; lead 7-match series 3–0.**
- India in South Africa:
  - 5th ODI in Centurion: South Africa 250/9 (46/46 overs; Hashim Amla 116*); India 234 (40.2 overs; Yusuf Pathan 105). **South Africa win by 33 runs (D/L); win 5-match series 3–2.**

==== Cross-country skiing ====
- World Cup in Otepää, Estonia:
  - Men's Classic Sprint: (gold) Eirik Brandsdal (NOR) 3:25.5 (silver) Ola Vigen Hattestad (NOR) 3:25.5 (bronze) Nikita Kriukov (RUS) 3:25.8
    - Sprint standings (after 7 of 11 races): (1) Emil Jönsson (SWE) 330 points (2) Hattestad 264 (3) Jesper Modin (SWE) 220
    - Overall standings (after 21 of 31 races): (1) Dario Cologna (SUI) 1197 points (2) Petter Northug (NOR) 774 (3) Lukáš Bauer (CZE) 698
  - Women's Classic Sprint: (gold) Petra Majdič (SVN) 3:07.2 (silver) Hanna Brodin (SWE) 3:07.9 (bronze) Maiken Caspersen Falla (NOR) 3:09.2
    - Sprint standings (after 7 of 11 races): (1) Majdič 354 points (2) Kikkan Randall (USA) 291 (3) Arianna Follis (ITA) 288
    - Overall standings (after 21 of 31 races): (1) Justyna Kowalczyk (POL) 1401 points (2) Marit Bjørgen (NOR) 922 (3) Follis 880

==== Cycling ====
- UCI World Tour:
  - Tour Down Under in Australia:
    - Stage 6, Adelaide to Adelaide, 90 km (56 mi): (gold) Ben Swift (GBR) (Team Sky) 1h 53' 47" (silver) Greg Henderson (NZL) (Team Sky) s.t. (bronze) Matthew Goss (AUS) (HTC–Highroad) s.t.
      - Final overall standings: (1) Cameron Meyer (AUS) (Garmin–Cervélo) 17h 54' 27" (2) Goss + 2" (3) Swift + 8"

==== Football (soccer) ====
- Central American Cup in Panama:
  - Third place match: El Salvador 0–0 (4–5 pen.) (bronze) **Panama**
  - Final: (gold) **Honduras** 2–1 (silver) Costa Rica
    - Honduras win the championship for the third time.
- South American Youth Championship in Peru: (teams in **bold** advance to final group)
  - Group B:
    - Ecuador 1–0 Paraguay
    - **Brazil** 1–1 Bolivia
      - Standings: Brazil 7 points (3 matches), Ecuador 4 (2), Paraguay 3 (3), Bolivia, Colombia 1 (2).
- Commonwealth of Independent States Cup in Saint Petersburg, Russia:
  - Final: **Inter Baku** (Azerbaijan) 0–0 (6–5 pen.) (Belarus) Shakhtyor Soligorsk
    - Baku win the title for the first time.

==== Freestyle skiing ====
- World Cup in Lake Placid, United States:
  - Moguls men: (gold) Guilbaut Colas (FRA) 25.70 points (silver) Mikaël Kingsbury (CAN) 25.59 (bronze) Pierre-Alexandre Rousseau (CAN) 25.16
    - Moguls standings (after 6 of 11 events): (1) Colas 500 points (2) Kingsbury 355 (3) Alexandre Bilodeau (CAN) 299
    - Overall standings: (1) Colas 83 points (2) Andreas Matt (AUT) 64 (3) Qi Guangpu (CHN) 63
  - Moguls women: (gold) Hannah Kearney (USA) 26.12 points (silver) Chloé Dufour-Lapointe (CAN) 24.85 (bronze) Kristi Richards (CAN) 24.57
    - Moguls standings (after 6 of 11 events): (1) Kearney 509 points (2) Jennifer Heil (CAN) 390 (3) Richards 286
    - Overall standings: (1) Kearney 85 points (2) Xu Mengtao (CHN) 68 (3) Kelsey Serwa (CAN) 66

==== Golf ====
- PGA Tour:
  - Bob Hope Classic in Palm Desert and La Quinta, California:
    - Winner: Jhonattan Vegas (VEN) 333 (−27)^{PO}
      - In his fifth PGA Tour event, Vegas wins his maiden title, and also the first PGA Tour title by a Venezuelan, defeating defending champion Bill Haas (USA) and Gary Woodland (USA) in a playoff.
- European Tour:
  - Abu Dhabi HSBC Golf Championship in Abu Dhabi, United Arab Emirates:
    - Winner: Martin Kaymer (GER) 264 (−24)
      - Kaymer wins the tournament for the third time in four years, and wins his ninth European Tour title.
- Champions Tour:
  - Mitsubishi Electric Championship at Hualalai in Kaʻūpūlehu, Hawaii:
    - Winner: John Cook (USA) 194 (−22)
      - Cook wins his sixth Champions Tour title.

==== Handball ====
- World Men's Championship in Sweden:
  - Group II: (teams in **bold** advance to semifinals)
    - **Sweden** 29–25 Croatia
    - Argentina 24–31 **Denmark**
    - Poland 27–26 Serbia
      - Standings (after 4 matches): Denmark 8 points, Sweden 6, Poland 4, Croatia 3, Argentina 2, Serbia 1.
  - 23rd place match: Australia 23–33 **Bahrain**
  - 21st place match: Chile 18–28 **Brazil**
  - 19th place match: Tunisia 29–30 **Romania**
  - 17th place match: Austria 35–39 **Slovakia**

==== Luge ====
- World Cup in Altenberg, Germany:
  - Men's singles: (gold) Felix Loch (GER) 1:50.725 (55.090 / 55.635) (silver) Armin Zöggeler (ITA) 1:50.866 (55.321 / 55.545) (bronze) Albert Demtschenko (RUS) 1:50.915 (55.356 / 55.559)
    - Standings (after 7 of 9 events): (1) Zöggeler 610 points (2) Loch 545 (3) David Möller (GER) 440
  - Team relay: (gold) Germany (Tatjana Hüfner, Felix Loch, Tobias Wendl/Tobias Arlt) 2:25.216 (47.434 / 48.724 / 49.058) (silver) Russia (Tatiana Ivanova, Albert Demtschenko, Vladislav Yuzhakov/Vladimir Makhnutin) 2:25.746 (47.912 / 48.685 / 49.149) (bronze) Austria (Nina Reithmayer, Daniel Pfister, Georg Fischler/Peter Penz) 2:25.941 (47.823 / 49.161 / 48.957)
    - Standings (after 5 of 6 events): (1) Germany 500 points (2) Italy 355 (3) Austria & Russia 326
      - Germany win their fifth consecutive title.

==== Nordic combined ====
- World Cup in Chaux-Neuve, France:
  - HS 117 / 10 km: (gold) Jason Lamy-Chappuis (FRA) 22:00.3 (silver) Felix Gottwald (AUT) 22:07.5 (bronze) Mikko Kokslien (NOR) 22:07.7
    - Standings (after 11 of 13 races): (1) Lamy-Chappuis 789 points (2) Kokslien 609 (3) Gottwald 556

==== Rugby union ====
- Heineken Cup pool stage, matchday 6 (teams in **bold** advance to the Heineken Cup knockout stages, team in italics advances to the Amlin Challenge Cup knockout stages):
  - Pool 5:
    - **Leicester Tigers** (England) 62–15 (Italy) Benetton Treviso
    - **Perpignan** (France) 37–5 (Wales) Scarlets
      - Final standings: Perpignan 22 points (6–3 in head-to head competition points), Leicester Tigers 22 (3–6), Scarlets 15, Benetton Treviso 1.
  - Pool 6:
    - Newport Gwent Dragons (Wales) 16–23 (Scotland) Glasgow Warriors
    - London Wasps (England) 21–16 (France) **Toulouse**
      - Final standings: Toulouse 22 points, London Wasps 19, Glasgow Warriors 12, Newport Gwent Dragons 2.
  - Quarterfinal matchups:
    - Northampton Saints (England) vs. (Ireland) Ulster
    - Leinster (Ireland) vs. (England) Leicester Tigers
    - Perpignan (France) vs. (France) Toulon
    - Biarritz (France) vs. (France) Toulouse
- Amlin Challenge Cup pool stage, matchday 6 (teams in **bold** advance to the knockout stages):
  - Pool 3: Bourgoin (France) – (England) Newcastle Falcons — postponed due to a frozen pitch, and will not be played.
    - Final standings: (France) **Montpellier** 21 points (6 matches), (England) Exeter Chiefs 16 (6), Newcastle Falcons 9 (5), Bourgoin 6 (5).
  - Pool 4:
    - Crociati Parma (Italy) 17–34 (France) **Stade Français**
    - Leeds Carnegie (England) 26–6 (Romania) București Oaks
      - Final standings: Stade Français 29 points, Leeds Carnegie 19, București Oaks, Crociati Parma 5.
  - Quarterfinal matchups:
    - Stade Français (France) vs. (France) Montpellier
    - Brive (France) vs. (Ireland) Munster
    - La Rochelle (France) vs. (France) Clermont
    - Harlequins (England) vs. (England) London Wasps

==== Skeleton ====
- World Cup and FIBT European Championships in Winterberg, Germany:
  - Men: (gold) Martins Dukurs (LAT) 1:55.41 (57.48 / 57.93) (silver) Sergey Chudinov (RUS) 1:55.61 (57.55 / 58.06) (bronze) Aleksandr Tretyakov (RUS) 1:55.71 (57.78 / 57.93)
    - Dukurs wins his second consecutive European title.
    - Standings (after 6 of 8 events): (1) Dukurs 1269 points (2) Tretyakov 1155 (3) Chudinov 1109

==== Ski jumping ====
- World Cup in Zakopane, Poland:
  - HS 134: (gold) Kamil Stoch (POL) 254.0 points (silver) Tom Hilde (NOR) 249.5 (bronze) Michael Uhrmann (GER) 246.8
    - Standings (after 18 of 26 events): (1) Thomas Morgenstern (AUT) 1384 points (2) Simon Ammann (SUI) 953 (3) Andreas Kofler (AUT) 915

==== Speed skating ====
- World Sprint Championships in Heerenveen, Netherlands:
  - Men: (gold) Lee Kyou-hyuk (KOR) 139.255 points (silver) Mo Tae-bum (KOR) 139.365 (bronze) Shani Davis (USA) 139.600
    - Lee wins his fourth world title in five years.
  - Women: (gold) Christine Nesbitt (CAN) 152.220 points (silver) Annette Gerritsen (NED) 154.015 (bronze) Margot Boer (NED) 154.025
    - Nesbitt wins her first world title.

==== Tennis ====
- Australian Open in Melbourne, Australia, day 7:
  - Men's singles – 4th round:
    - **Roger Federer** (SUI) [2] def. Tommy Robredo (ESP) 6–3, 3–6, 6–3, 6–2
    - **Novak Djokovic** (SRB) [3] def. Nicolás Almagro (ESP) [14] 6–3, 6–4, 6–0
    - **Tomáš Berdych** (CZE) [6] def. Fernando Verdasco (ESP) [9] 6–4, 6–2, 6–3
    - **Stanislas Wawrinka** (SUI) [19] def. Andy Roddick (USA) [8] 6–3, 6–4, 6–4
  - Women's singles – 4th round:
    - **Caroline Wozniacki** (DEN) [1] def. Anastasija Sevastova (LAT) 6–3, 6–4
    - **Francesca Schiavone** (ITA) [6] def. Svetlana Kuznetsova (RUS) [23] 6–4, 1–6, 16–14
      - This was the longest women's match by time in a Grand Slam event in the open era, lasting 4 hours, 44 minutes.
    - **Li Na** (CHN) [9] def. Victoria Azarenka (BLR) [8] 6–3, 6–3
    - **Andrea Petkovic** (GER) [30] def. Maria Sharapova (RUS) [14] 6–2, 6–3

=== January 22, 2011 (Saturday) ===
==== Alpine skiing ====
- Men's World Cup in Kitzbühel, Austria:
  - Downhill: (gold) Didier Cuche (SUI) 1:57.72 (silver) Bode Miller (USA) 1:58.70 (bronze) Adrien Théaux (FRA) 1:58.90
    - Cuche becomes the oldest winner of a men's World Cup race, at the age of 36 years, 159 days.
    - Downhill standings (after 5 of 9 races): (1) Cuche 279 points (2) Silvan Zurbriggen (SUI) 270 (3) Michael Walchhofer (AUT) 269
    - Overall standings (after 20 of 38 races): (1) Ivica Kostelić (CRO) 850 points (2) Aksel Lund Svindal (NOR) 585 (3) Cuche 573
- Women's World Cup in Cortina, Italy:
  - Downhill: (gold) Maria Riesch (GER) 1:39.30 (silver) Julia Mancuso (USA) 1:40.21 (bronze) Lindsey Vonn (USA) 1:40.30
    - Downhill standings (after 5 of 9 races): (1) Vonn 420 points (2) Riesch 357 (3) Mancuso 217
    - Overall standings (after 20 of 38 races): (1) Riesch 1152 points (2) Vonn 987 (3) Elisabeth Görgl (AUT) 592

==== Basketball ====
- PBA Philippine Cup finals (best-of-7 series):
  - Game 1 in Victorias: Talk 'N Text Tropang Texters 91, San Miguel Beermen 82. Talk 'N Text lead the series 1–0.

==== Biathlon ====
- World Cup 6 in Antholz, Italy:
  - Women's 4 x 6 km Relay: (gold) Russia (Svetlana Sleptsova, Anna Bogaliy-Titovets, Natalia Guseva, Olga Zaitseva) 1:11:14.7 (0+6) (silver) Sweden (Jenny Jonsson, Anna Carin Olofsson-Zidek, Anna Maria Nilsson, Helena Ekholm) 1:12:11.8 (0+7) (bronze) Germany (Sabrina Buchholz, Kathrin Hitzer, Miriam Gössner, Andrea Henkel) 1:13:34.8 (4+13)
    - Standings (after 3 of 4 races): (1) Sweden 152 points (2) Germany 146 (3) Russia 143
  - Men's 15 km Mass Start: (gold) Martin Fourcade (FRA) 35:33.4 (0+0+1+0) (silver) Björn Ferry (SWE) 35:50.6 (0+0+1+1) (bronze) Anton Shipulin (RUS) 35:51.0 (1+1+0+0)
    - Mass start standings (after 2 of 5 races): (1) Fourcade 103 points (2) Tarjei Bø (NOR) & Emil Hegle Svendsen (NOR) 86
    - Overall standings (after 14 of 26 races): (1) Bø 598 points (2) Svendsen 592 (3) Michael Greis (GER) 485

==== Bobsleigh ====
- World Cup and FIBT European Championships in Winterberg, Germany:
  - Two-man: (gold) Alexandr Zubkov/Alexey Voyevoda (RUS) 1:52.21 (56.20 / 56.01) (silver) Thomas Florschütz/Kevin Kuske (GER) 1:52.35 (56.16 / 56.19) (bronze) Karl Angerer/Alex Mann (GER) 1:52.44 (56.37 / 56.07)
    - Standings (after 6 of 8 races): (1) Zubkov 1238 points (2) Manuel Machata (GER) 1187 (3) Simone Bertazzo (ITA) 1107

==== Cricket ====
- Pakistan in New Zealand:
  - 1st ODI in Wellington: Pakistan 124 (37.3 overs; Tim Southee 5/33); New Zealand 125/1 (17.2 overs). **New Zealand win by 9 wickets; lead 6-match series 1–0.**

==== Cross-country skiing ====
- World Cup in Otepää, Estonia:
  - Men's 15 km Classic: (gold) Eldar Rønning (NOR) 37:27.2 (silver) Daniel Rickardsson (SWE) 37:42.3 (bronze) Maxim Vylegzhanin (RUS) 37:44.8
    - Distance standings (after 12 of 17 races): (1) Dario Cologna (SUI) 481 points (2) Alexander Legkov (RUS) 406 (3) Lukáš Bauer (CZE) 400
    - Overall standings (after 20 of 31 races): (1) Cologna 1197 points (2) Petter Northug (NOR) 738 (3) Bauer 698
  - Women's 10 km Classic: (gold) Marit Bjørgen (NOR) 27:02.1 (silver) Justyna Kowalczyk (POL) 27:34.1 (bronze) Therese Johaug (NOR) 27:43.7
    - Distance standings (after 12 of 17 races): (1) Kowalczyk 672 points (2) Bjørgen 510 (3) Johaug 430
    - Overall standings (after 20 of 31 races): (1) Kowalczyk 1351 points (2) Bjørgen 896 (3) Arianna Follis (ITA) 880

==== Cycling ====
- UCI World Tour:
  - Tour Down Under in Australia:
    - Stage 5, McLaren Vale to Willunga, 131 km (81 mi): (gold) Francisco Ventoso (ESP) (Movistar Team) 3h 06' 10" (silver) Michael Matthews (AUS) (Rabobank) s.t. (bronze) Matthew Goss (AUS) (HTC–Highroad) s.t.
      - Overall standings: (1) Cameron Meyer (AUS) (Garmin–Cervélo) 16h 00' 40" (2) Goss + 8" (3) Laurens ten Dam (NED) (Rabobank) + 10"

==== Equestrianism ====
- Dressage:
  - FEI World Cup Western European League:
    - 7th competition in Amsterdam (CDI-W): (gold) Adelinde Cornelissen (NED) on Parzival (silver) Isabell Werth (GER) on Warum nicht FRH (bronze) Patrik Kittel (SWE) on Watermill Scandic H.B.C.
      - Standings (after 7 of 10 competitions): (1) Ulla Salzgeber (GER) & Werth 74 points (3) Cornelissen 63

==== Football (soccer) ====
- AFC Asian Cup in Qatar:
  - Quarterfinals:
    - **Australia** 1–0 (a.e.t.) Iraq
    - Iran 0–1 (a.e.t.) **South Korea**
- South American Youth Championship in Peru: (teams in **bold** advance to the second stage)
  - Group A:
    - **Argentina** 1–1 Venezuela
    - Chile 0–4 Uruguay
      - Standings: Argentina 7 points (3 matches), Uruguay 4 (3), Chile 3 (2), Venezuela 2 (2), Peru 0 (2).
- African Under-17 Championship in Rwanda:
  - Final: (gold) **Burkina Faso** 2–1 (silver) Rwanda
    - Burkina Faso win the championship for the first time. Both teams qualify for the FIFA U-17 World Cup.

==== Freestyle skiing ====
- World Cup in Lake Placid, United States:
  - Moguls men: (gold) Guilbaut Colas (FRA) 25.81 points (silver) Alexandre Bilodeau (CAN) 25.59 (bronze) Jeremy Cota (USA) 25.31
    - Moguls standings (after 5 of 11 events): (1) Colas 400 points (2) Bilodeau & Mikaël Kingsbury (CAN) 275
    - Overall standings: (1) Colas 80 points (2) Andreas Matt (AUT) 64 (3) Qi Guangpu (CHN) 63
  - Moguls women: (gold) Hannah Kearney (USA) 25.45 points (silver) Jennifer Heil (CAN) 24.72 (bronze) Audrey Robichaud (CAN) 24.41
    - Moguls standings (after 5 of 11 events): (1) Kearney 409 points (2) Heil 340 (3) Justine Dufour-Lapointe (CAN) 227
    - Overall standings: (1) Kearney 82 points (2) Heil & Xu Mengtao (CHN) 68

==== Handball ====
- World Men's Championship in Sweden: (teams in ~~strike~~ are eliminated)
  - Group I:
    - Spain 32–27 ~~Norway~~
    - Germany 27–24 Iceland
    - France 37–24 Hungary
      - Standings (after 3 matches): France, Spain 5 points, Iceland 4, Germany, Hungary 2, Norway 0.
  - Group II:
    - Croatia 36–18 Argentina
    - Serbia 24–28 Sweden
    - Denmark 28–27 Poland
      - Standings (after 3 matches): Denmark 6 points, Sweden 4, Croatia 3, Poland, Argentina 2, Serbia 1.
  - Presidents Cup:
    - **Egypt** 34–28 Japan
    - Tunisia 25–26 **Austria**
    - Australia 21–29 **Chile**
    - Algeria 24–29 (OT) **South Korea**
    - Romania 33–38 **Slovakia**
    - Bahrain 30–37 **Brazil**

==== Korfball ====
- Europa Cup in Budapest, Hungary:
  - 7th place match: CC Oeiras (Portugal) 19–15 (Catalonia) CK Vacarisses
  - 5th place match: Szentendre KK (Hungary) 23–12 (Germany) KV Adler Rauxel
  - Third place match: (bronze) České Budějovice (Czech Republic) 19–18 (England) Trojans KC
  - Final: (silver) R Scaldis SC (Belgium) 23–33 (gold) (Netherlands) **Koog Zaandijk**
    - Koog Zaandijk win the tournament for the second time.

==== Luge ====
- World Cup in Altenberg, Germany:
  - Women's singles: (gold) Tatjana Hüfner (GER) 1:45.626 (53.015 / 52.611) (silver) Natalie Geisenberger (GER) 1:45.648 (52.861 / 52.787) (bronze) Anke Wischnewski (GER) 1:46.270 (53.253 / 53.017)
    - Hüfner wins her sixth race of the season.
    - Standings (after 7 of 9 events): (1) Hüfner 685 points (2) Geisenberger 560 (3) Wischnewski 485
  - Doubles: (gold) Andreas Linger/Wolfgang Linger (AUT) 1:24.076 (42.062 / 42.014) (silver) Tobias Wendl/Tobias Arlt (GER) 1:24.352 (42.184 / 42.168) (bronze) Toni Eggert/Sascha Benecken (GER) 1:24.514 (42.294 / 42.220)
    - Standings (after 7 of 9 events): (1) Wendl/Arlt 615 points (2) Christian Oberstolz/Patrick Gruber (ITA) 540 (3) Linger/Linger 492

==== Mixed martial arts ====
- UFC: Fight For The Troops 2 in Fort Hood, Killeen, Texas, United States:
  - Lightweight bout: Matt Wiman (USA) def. Cole Miller (USA) by unanimous decision (29–28, 30–27, 30–27)
  - Heavyweight bout: Pat Barry (USA) def. Joey Beltran (USA) by unanimous decision (30–27, 29–28, 29–28)
  - Featherweight bout: Mark Hominick (CAN) def. George Roop (USA) by TKO (punches)
  - Heavyweight bout: Matt Mitrione (USA) def. Tim Hague (CAN) by TKO (punches)
  - Lightweight bout: Melvin Guillard (USA) def. Evan Dunham (USA) by TKO (strikes)

==== Nordic combined ====
- World Cup in Chaux-Neuve, France:
  - HS 117 / 10 km: (gold) David Kreiner (AUT) 21:59.2 (silver) Mikko Kokslien (NOR) 21:59.8 (bronze) Felix Gottwald (AUT) 22:00.7
    - Standings (after 10 of 13 races): (1) Jason Lamy-Chappuis (FRA) 689 points (2) Kokslien 549 (3) Gottwald 476

==== Rugby union ====
- Heineken Cup pool stage, matchday 6 (teams in **bold** advance to the Heineken Cup knockout stages, team in italics advances to the Amlin Challenge Cup knockout stages):
  - Pool 1:
    - Castres (France) 12–23 (England) **Northampton Saints**
    - Edinburgh (Scotland) 14–21 (Wales) Cardiff Blues
      - Final standings: Northampton Saints 25 points, Cardiff Blues 14, Castres 11, Edinburgh 8.
  - Pool 3:
    - Munster (Ireland) 28–14 (England) London Irish
    - Ospreys (Wales) 29–17 (France) **Toulon**
      - Final standings: Toulon 17 points, Munster 16, Ospreys 14, London Irish 9.
  - Pool 4:
    - Aironi (Italy) 6–43 (Ireland) **Ulster**
    - **Biarritz** (France) 26–19 (England) Bath
      - Final standings: Biarritz 22 points (6–4 in head-to head competition points), Ulster 22 (4–6), Bath 14, Aironi 4.
- Amlin Challenge Cup pool stage, matchday 6 (teams in **bold** advance to the knockout stages):
  - Pool 1:
    - Connacht (Ireland) 83–7 (Italy) Cavalieri Prato
    - **Harlequins** (England) 39–17 (France) Bayonne
      - Final standings: Harlequins 24 points, Connacht 15 (8–1 in head-to head competition points), Bayonne 15 (1–8), Cavalieri Prato 4.
  - Pool 2:
    - El Salvador (Spain) 5–50 (England) Sale Sharks
    - Petrarca Padova (Italy) 20–24 (France) **Brive**
      - Final standings: Brive 27 points, Sale Sharks 21, Petrarca Padova 6, El Salvador 4.
  - Pool 3:
    - Bourgoin (France) – (England) Newcastle Falcons — postponed to January 23 due to a frozen pitch
    - **Montpellier** (France) 32–30 (England) Exeter Chiefs
      - Standings: Montpellier 21 points (6 matches), Exeter Chiefs 16 (6), Newcastle Falcons 9 (5), Bourgoin 6 (5).

==== Skeleton ====
- World Cup and FIBT European Championships in Winterberg, Germany:
  - Women: (gold) Shelley Rudman (GBR) 1:57.77 (58.75 / 59.02) (silver) Anja Huber (GER) 1:57.99 (58.90 / 59.09) (bronze) Amy Gough (CAN) 1:58.52 (59.21 / 59.31)
    - Rudman wins her second European title in three years.
    - Standings (after 6 of 8 events): (1) Huber 1285 points (2) Rudman 1249 (3) Mellisa Hollingsworth (CAN) 1154

==== Ski jumping ====
- World Cup in Zakopane, Poland:
  - HS 134: (gold) Simon Ammann (SUI) 276.3 points (silver) Thomas Morgenstern (AUT) 268.9 (bronze) Tom Hilde (NOR) 267.1
    - Standings (after 17 of 26 events): (1) Morgenstern 1348 points (2) Ammann 903 (3) Andreas Kofler (AUT) 901

==== Snowboarding ====
- World Championships in La Molina, Spain:
  - Parallel slalom men: (gold) Benjamin Karl (AUT) (silver) Simon Schoch (SUI) (bronze) Rok Marguč (SLO)
    - Karl wins his second world title of the championships.
  - Parallel slalom women: (gold) Hilde-Katrine Engeli (NOR) (silver) Nicolien Sauerbreij (NED) (bronze) Claudia Riegler (AUT)
    - Engeli wins her first world title.
  - Slopestyle men: (gold) Seppe Smits (BEL) 28.7 points (silver) Niklas Mattson (SWE) 28.1 (bronze) Ville Paumola (FIN) 26.2
    - Smits wins his first world title.
  - Slopestyle women: (gold) Enni Rukajärvi (FIN) 28.2 points (silver) Šárka Pančochová (CZE) 25.2 (bronze) Shelly Gotlieb (NZL) 21.6
    - Rukajärvi wins her first world title.

==== Tennis ====
- Australian Open in Melbourne, Australia, day 6:
  - Men's singles – 3rd round:
    - **Rafael Nadal** (ESP) [1] def. Bernard Tomic (AUS) 6–2, 7–5, 6–3
    - **Robin Söderling** (SWE) [4] def. Jan Hernych (CZE) 6–3, 6–1, 6–4
    - **Andy Murray** (GBR) [5] def. Guillermo García López (ESP) [32] 6–1, 6–1, 6–2
    - **David Ferrer** (ESP) [7] def. Ričardas Berankis (LTU) 6–2, 6–2, 6–1
    - **Milos Raonic** (CAN) def. Mikhail Youzhny (RUS) [10] 6–4, 7–5, 4–6, 6–4
  - Women's singles – 3rd round:
    - **Vera Zvonareva** (RUS) [2] def. Lucie Šafářová (CZE) [31] 6–3, 7–6(9)
    - **Kim Clijsters** (BEL) [3] def. Alizé Cornet (FRA) 7–6(3), 6–3
    - **Petra Kvitová** (CZE) [25] def. Samantha Stosur (AUS) [5] 7–6(5), 6–3
    - **Flavia Pennetta** (ITA) [22] def. Shahar Pe'er (ISR) [10] 3–6, 7–6(3), 6–4

=== January 21, 2011 (Friday) ===
==== Alpine skiing ====
- Men's World Cup in Kitzbühel, Austria:
  - Super-G: (gold) Ivica Kostelić (CRO) 1:17.33 (silver) Georg Streitberger (AUT) 1:17.56 (bronze) Aksel Lund Svindal (NOR) 1:17.61
    - Super G standings (after 4 of 7 races): (1) Streitberger 227 points (2) Didier Cuche (SUI) 179 (3) Romed Baumann (AUT) 163
    - Overall standings (after 19 of 38 races): (1) Kostelić 826 points (2) Svindal 571 (3) Silvan Zurbriggen (SUI) 509
- Women's World Cup in Cortina, Italy:
  - Super-G: (gold) Lindsey Vonn (USA) 1:11.66 (silver) Anja Pärson (SWE) 1:12.09 (bronze) Anna Fenninger (AUT) 1:12.13
    - Super G standings (after 3 of 7 races): (1) Vonn 280 points (2) Maria Riesch (GER) 149 (3) Lara Gut (SUI) 145
    - Overall standings (after 19 of 38 races): (1) Riesch 1052 points (2) Vonn 927 (3) Tanja Poutiainen (FIN) 580

==== Biathlon ====
- World Cup 6 in Antholz, Italy:
  - Women's 7.5 km Sprint: (gold) Tora Berger (NOR) 20:08.1 (0+0) (silver) Anastasiya Kuzmina (SVK) 20:37.2 (0+1) (bronze) Olga Zaitseva (RUS) 20:44.5 (0+1)
    - Sprint standings (after 6 of 10 races): (1) Kaisa Mäkäräinen (FIN) 249 points (2) Kuzmina 237 (3) Andrea Henkel (GER) 216
    - Overall standings (after 13 of 26 races): (1) Mäkäräinen 560 points (2) Helena Ekholm (SWE) 521 (3) Henkel 497

==== Bobsleigh ====
- World Cup and FIBT European Championships in Winterberg, Germany:
  - Two-women: (gold) Sandra Kiriasis/Berit Wiacker (GER) 1:55.06 (57.66 / 57.40) (silver) Anja Schneiderheinze-Stöckel/Christin Senkel (GER) 1:55.55 (57.92 / 57.63) (bronze) Shauna Rohbock/Valerie Fleming (USA) 1:55.66 (57.97 / 57.69)
    - Kiriasis wins her fifth European title in six years, and Wiacker wins her fourth in six years.
    - Standings (after 6 of 8 races): (1) Kiriasis 1286 points (2) Cathleen Martini (GER) 1187 (3) Kaillie Humphries (CAN) 1024

==== Cricket ====
- England in Australia:
  - 2nd ODI in Hobart: Australia 230 (48.3 overs; Shaun Marsh 110); England 184 (45 overs). **Australia win by 46 runs; lead 7-match series 2–0.**
- India in South Africa:
  - 4th ODI in Port Elizabeth: South Africa 265/7 (50 overs); India 142/6 (32.5/46 overs). **South Africa win by 48 runs (D/L); 5-match series tied 2–2.**

==== Cycling ====
- UCI World Tour:
  - Tour Down Under in Australia:
    - Stage 4, Norwood to Strathalbyn, 124 km (77 mi): (gold) Cameron Meyer (AUS) (Garmin–Cervélo) 2h 57' 55" (silver) Thomas De Gendt (BEL) (Vacansoleil–DCM) s.t. (bronze) Laurens ten Dam (NED) (Rabobank) + 3"
      - Overall standings: (1) Meyer 12h 54' 30" (2) ten Dam + 10" (3) Matthew Goss (AUS) (HTC–Highroad) + 12"

==== Football (soccer) ====
- AFC Asian Cup in Qatar:
  - Quarterfinals:
    - **Japan** 3–2 Qatar
    - **Uzbekistan** 2–1 Jordan
- Central American Cup in Panama:
  - Fifth place match: Nicaragua 1–2 **Guatemala**
    - Guatemala qualify for the CONCACAF Gold Cup.
  - Semifinals:
    - **Honduras** 2–0 El Salvador
    - Panama 1–1 (2–4 pen.) **Costa Rica**
- African Under-17 Championship in Kigali, Rwanda:
  - Third place match: (bronze) **Congo** 2–1 Ivory Coast
    - Both teams qualify for the FIFA U-17 World Cup.

==== Freestyle skiing ====
- World Cup in Kreischberg, Austria:
  - Half Pipe men: (gold) Xavier Bertoni (FRA) 43.8 points (silver) Benoit Valentin (FRA) 42.7 (bronze) Nils Lauper (SUI) 39.0
  - Half Pipe women: (gold) Rosalind Groenewoud (CAN) 43.5 points (silver) Virginie Faivre (SUI) 43.3 (bronze) Katrien Aerts (BEL) 41.8
- World Cup in Lake Placid, United States:
  - Aerials men: (gold) Qi Guangpu (CHN) 250.70 points (silver) Ryan St. Onge (USA) 246.21 (bronze) Anton Kushnir (BLR) 241.42
    - Aerials standings (after 4 of 8 events): (1) Qi 316 points (2) Jia Zongyang (CHN) 238 (3) Anton Kushnir (BLR) 228
    - Overall standings: (1) Andreas Matt (AUT) 64 points (2) Qi 63 (3) Guilbaut Colas (FRA) 60
  - Aerials women: (gold) Ashley Caldwell (USA) 187.65 points (silver) Alla Tsuper (BLR) 186.42 (bronze) Xu Mengtao (CHN) 183.82
    - Aerials standings (after 4 of 8 events): (1) Xu 340 points (2) Cheng Shuang (CHN) 216 (3) Zhang Xin (CHN) 177
    - Overall standings: (1) Xu 68 points (2) Kelsey Serwa (CAN) 66 points (3) Hannah Kearney (USA) 62

==== Korfball ====
- Europa Cup in Budapest, Hungary:
  - Group A:
    - CC Oeiras (Portugal) 15–19 (Czech Republic) České Budějovice
    - Szentendre KK (Hungary) 6–26 (Belgium) R Scaldis SC
      - Standings: **Scaldis** 9 points, České Budějovice 6, Szentendre 3, CC Oeiras 0.
  - Group B:
    - Koog Zaandijk (Netherlands) 31–10 (England) Trojans KC
    - CK Vacarisses (Catalonia) 19–22 (Germany) KV Adler Rauxel
      - Standings: **Koog Zaandijk** 9 points, Trojans 6, Adler Rauxel 3, Vacarisses 0.

==== Rugby union ====
- Heineken Cup pool stage, matchday 6 (team in **bold** advances to the knockout stages):
  - Pool 2:
    - Racing Métro (France) 11–36 (Ireland) **Leinster**
    - Saracens (England) 14–24 (France) Clermont
      - Final standings: Leinster 24 points, Clermont 19, Racing Métro 9, Saracens 6.
      - Clermont have also secured at least a place in the Amlin Challenge Cup knockout stages. They still have a mathematical chance of a Heineken Cup quarterfinal place.

==== Ski jumping ====
- World Cup in Zakopane, Poland:
  - HS 134: (gold) Adam Małysz (POL) 269.9 points (silver) Andreas Kofler (AUT) 264.5 (bronze) Severin Freund (GER) 264.0
    - Standings (after 16 of 26 events): (1) Thomas Morgenstern (AUT) 1268 points (2) Kofler 851 (3) Simon Ammann (SUI) 803

==== Snowboarding ====
- World Championships in La Molina, Spain:
  - Both men's and women's parallel slalom events were postponed to January 22 due to high winds.

==== Tennis ====
- Australian Open in Melbourne, Australia, day 5:
  - Men's singles – 3rd round:
    - **Roger Federer** (SUI) [2] def. Xavier Malisse (BEL) 6–3, 6–3, 6–1
    - **Novak Djokovic** (SRB) [3] def. Viktor Troicki (SRB) 6–2 retired
    - **Tomáš Berdych** (CZE) [6] def. Richard Gasquet (FRA) 6–2, 7–6(3), 6–2
    - **Andy Roddick** (USA) [8] def. Robin Haase (NED) 2–6, 7–6(2), 6–2, 6–2
    - **Fernando Verdasco** (ESP) [9] def. Kei Nishikori (JPN) 6–2, 6–4, 6–3
  - Women's singles – 3rd round:
    - **Caroline Wozniacki** (DEN) [1] def. Dominika Cibulková (SVK) 6–4, 6–3
    - **Andrea Petkovic** (GER) def. Venus Williams (USA) [4] 1–0 retired
    - **Francesca Schiavone** (ITA) [6] def. Monica Niculescu (ROU) 6–0, 7–6(2)
    - **Victoria Azarenka** (BLR) [8] def. Chanelle Scheepers (RSA) 6–3, 6–3
    - **Li Na** (CHN) [9] def. Barbora Záhlavová-Strýcová (CZE) 6–2, 6–1

=== January 20, 2011 (Thursday) ===
==== Basketball ====
- Euroleague Top 16, matchday 1:
  - Group E: Unicaja Málaga (Spain) 71–76 (Spain) Caja Laboral
  - Group F:
    - Regal FC Barcelona (Spain) 81–71 (Israel) Maccabi Tel Aviv
    - Virtus Roma (Italy) 63–64 (Slovenia) Union Olimpija Ljubljana
  - Group H: Olympiacos Piraeus (Greece) 70–84 (Turkey) Fenerbahçe Ülker

==== Biathlon ====
- World Cup 6 in Antholz, Italy:
  - Men's 10 km Sprint: (gold) Anton Shipulin (RUS) 23:36.2 (0+0) (silver) Michael Greis (GER) 23:46.2 (0+0) (bronze) Lars Berger (NOR) 23:56.7 (0+1)
    - Sprint standings (after 6 of 10 races): (1) Tarjei Bø (NOR) 254 points (2) Emil Hegle Svendsen (NOR) 231 (3) Greis 222
    - Overall standings (after 13 of 26 races): (1) Bø 572 points (2) Svendsen 560 (3) Greis 447

==== Cycling ====
- UCI World Tour:
  - Tour Down Under in Australia:
    - Stage 3, Unley to Stirling, 129 km (80 mi): (gold) Michael Matthews (AUS) (Rabobank) 3h 11' 47" (silver) André Greipel (GER) (Omega Pharma–Lotto) s.t. (bronze) Matthew Goss (AUS) (HTC–Highroad) s.t.
      - Overall standings: (1) Goss 9h 56' 25" (2) Greipel + 2" (3) Robbie McEwen (AUS) (Team RadioShack) + 4"

==== Football (soccer) ====
- South American Youth Championship in Peru:
  - Group B:
    - Bolivia 0–1 Paraguay
    - Colombia 1–3 Brazil
      - Standings: Brazil 6 points (2 matches), Paraguay 3 (2), Ecuador 1 (1), Colombia 1 (2), Bolivia 0 (1).

==== Handball ====
- World Men's Championship in Sweden: (teams in **bold** advance to the main round)
  - Group A:
    - Egypt 26–27 Bahrain
    - **Germany** 36–26 Tunisia
    - **France** 28–28 **Spain**
      - Final standings: France, Spain 9 points, Germany 6, Tunisia, Egypt, Bahrain 2.
  - Group B:
    - Brazil 32–33 Japan
    - **Iceland** 29–22 **Norway**
    - Austria 30–32 **Hungary**
      - Final standings: Iceland 10 points, Hungary 8, Norway 6, Japan 4, Austria 2, Brazil 0.
  - Group C:
    - Algeria 27–18 Australia
    - **Croatia** 29–34 **Denmark**
    - **Serbia** 28–38 Romania
      - Final standings: Denmark 10 points, Croatia 7, Serbia 5, Algeria, Romania 4, Australia 0.
  - Group D:
    - South Korea 31–26 Slovakia
    - **Argentina** 35–25 Chile
    - **Poland** 21–24 **Sweden**
      - Final standings: Sweden, Poland 8 points, Argentina 7, South Korea 5, Slovakia, Chile 1.

==== Korfball ====
- Europa Cup in Budapest, Hungary:
  - Group A:
    - R Scaldis SC (Belgium) 22–6 (Portugal) CC Oeiras
    - Szentendre KK (Hungary) 12–18 (Czech Republic) České Budějovice
      - Standings (after 2 matches): Scaldis 6 points, České Budějovice, Szentendre 3, CC Oeiras 0.
  - Group B:
    - Trojans KC (England) 26–21 (Germany) KV Adler Rauxel
    - Koog Zaandijk (Netherlands) 36–9 (Catalonia) CK Vacarisses
      - Standings (after 2 matches): Koog Zaandijk, Trojans 6 points, Vacarisses, Adler Rauxel 0.

==== Rugby union ====
- Amlin Challenge Cup pool stage, matchday 6 (team in **bold** advances to the knockout stages):
  - Pool 5:
    - Gloucester (England) 60–7 (France) Agen
    - **La Rochelle** (France) 71–17 (Italy) Rovigo
      - Final standings: La Rochelle 24 points, Gloucester 21, Agen 15, Rovigo 0.

==== Snowboarding ====
- World Championships in La Molina, Spain:
  - Men's halfpipe: (gold) Nathan Johnstone (AUS) 26.8 points (silver) Yuri Podladchikov (SUI) 26.2 (bronze) Markus Malin (FIN) 24.3
    - Johnstone wins his first world title.
  - Women's halfpipe: (gold) Holly Crawford (AUS) 26.7 points (silver) Ursina Haller (SUI) 23.4 (bronze) Liu Jiayu (CHN) 22.5
    - Crawford wins her first world title.

==== Tennis ====
- Australian Open in Melbourne, Australia, day 4:
  - Men's singles – 2nd round:
    - **Rafael Nadal** (ESP) [1] def. Ryan Sweeting (USA) 6–2, 6–1, 6–1
    - **Robin Söderling** (SWE) [4] def. Gilles Müller (LUX) 6–3, 7–6(1), 6–1
    - **Andy Murray** (GBR) [5] def. Illya Marchenko (UKR) 6–1, 6–3, 6–3
    - **David Ferrer** (ESP) [7] def. Michael Russell (USA) 6–0, 6–1, 7–5
    - **Mikhail Youzhny** (RUS) [10] def. Blaž Kavčič (SVN) 6–3, 6–1, 5–7, 4–6, 6–1
  - Women's singles – 2nd round:
    - **Vera Zvonareva** (RUS) [2] def. Bojana Jovanovski (SRB) 2–6, 6–3, 6–1
    - **Kim Clijsters** (BEL) [3] def. Carla Suárez Navarro (ESP) 6–1, 6–3
    - **Samantha Stosur** (AUS) [5] def. Vera Dushevina (RUS) 6–3, 6–2
    - **Peng Shuai** (CHN) def. Jelena Janković (SRB) [7] 7–6(3), 6–3
    - **Shahar Pe'er** (ISR) [10] def. Sorana Cîrstea (ROU) 6–3, 6–2

=== January 19, 2011 (Wednesday) ===
==== Basketball ====
- Euroleague Top 16, matchday 1:
  - Group E: Lietuvos Rytas (Lithuania) 59–80 (Greece) Panathinaikos Athens
  - Group G:
    - Efes Pilsen Istanbul (Turkey) 60–58 (Italy) Montepaschi Siena
    - Real Madrid (Spain) 78–58 (Serbia) Partizan Belgrade
  - Group H: Power Electronics Valencia (Spain) 73–59 (Lithuania) Žalgiris Kaunas

==== Cricket ====
- Pakistan in New Zealand:
  - 2nd Test in Wellington, day 5: New Zealand 356 & 293; Pakistan 376 & 226/5 (92 overs). **Match drawn; Pakistan win 2-match series 1–0.**

==== Cycling ====
- UCI World Tour:
  - Tour Down Under in Australia:
    - Stage 2, Tailem Bend to Mannum, 146 km (91 mi): (gold) Ben Swift (GBR) (Team Sky) 3h 27' 44" (silver) Robbie McEwen (AUS) (Team RadioShack) s.t. (bronze) Graeme Brown (AUS) (Rabobank) s.t.
      - Overall standings: (1) McEwen 6h 44' 42" (2) Matthew Goss (AUS) (HTC–Highroad) + 0" (3) Swift + 0"

==== Football (soccer) ====
- AFC Asian Cup in Qatar: (teams in **bold** advance to the quarterfinals)
  - Group D:
    - **Iraq** 1–0 North Korea
    - United Arab Emirates 0–3 **Iran**
      - Final standings: Iran 9 points, Iraq 6, North Korea, United Arab Emirates 1.
- South American Youth Championship in Peru:
  - Group A:
    - Peru 1–2 Argentina
    - Venezuela 1–1 Uruguay
      - Standings: Argentina 6 points (2 matches), Chile 3 (1), Venezuela 1 (1), Uruguay 1 (2), Peru 0 (2).
- OFC U-17 Championship in Albany, North Shore City, New Zealand:
  - 3rd place: Vanuatu 0–2 (bronze) **Solomon Islands**
  - Final: (gold) **New Zealand** 2–0 (silver) **Tahiti**
    - New Zealand win the tournament for the third successive time and fourth time overall, and qualifies for the FIFA U-17 World Cup.

==== Handball ====
- World Men's Championship in Sweden: (teams in **bold** advance to the main round)
  - Group A:
    - Bahrain 21–28 Tunisia
    - Germany 23–30 **France**
    - **Spain** 31–18 Egypt
      - Standings (after 4 games): France, Spain 8 points, Germany 4, Tunisia, Egypt 2, Bahrain 0.
  - Group C:
    - **Serbia** 24–24 **Croatia**
    - **Denmark** 26–19 Algeria
    - Australia 14–29 Romania
      - Standings (after 4 games): Denmark 8 points, Croatia 7, Serbia 5, Romania, Algeria 2, Australia 0.

==== Korfball ====
- Europa Cup in Budapest, Hungary:
  - Group A:
    - Szentendre KK (Hungary) 16–14 (Portugal) CC Oeiras
    - R Scaldis SC (Belgium) 37–17 (Czech Republic) České Budějovice
  - Group B:
    - Koog Zaandijk (Netherlands) 27–13 (Germany) KV Adler Rauxel
    - CK Vacarisses (Catalonia) 17–19 (England) Trojans KC

==== Snowboarding ====
- World Championships in La Molina, Spain:
  - Parallel giant slalom men: (gold) Benjamin Karl (AUT) (silver) Rok Marguč (SLO) (bronze) Roland Fischnaller (ITA)
    - Karl wins his first world title.
  - Parallel giant slalom women: (gold) Alena Zavarzina (RUS) (silver) Claudia Riegler (AUT) (bronze) Doris Günther (AUT)
    - Zavarzina wins her first world title.

==== Tennis ====
- Australian Open in Melbourne, Australia, day 3:
  - Men's singles – 2nd round:
    - **Roger Federer** (SUI) [2] def. Gilles Simon (FRA) 6–2, 6–3, 4–6, 4–6, 6–3
    - **Novak Djokovic** (SRB) [3] def. Ivan Dodig (CRO) 7–5, 6–7(8), 6–0, 6–2
    - **Tomáš Berdych** (CZE) [6] def. Philipp Kohlschreiber (GER) 4–6, 6–2, 6–3, 6–4
    - **Andy Roddick** (USA) [8] def. Igor Kunitsyn (RUS) 7–6(7), 6–2, 6–3
    - **Fernando Verdasco** (ESP) [9] def. Janko Tipsarević (SRB) 2–6, 4–6, 6–4, 7–6(0), 6–0
  - Women's singles – 2nd round:
    - **Caroline Wozniacki** (DEN) [1] def. Vania King (USA) 6–1, 6–0
    - **Venus Williams** (USA) [4] def. Sandra Záhlavová (CZE) 6–7(6), 6–0, 6–4
    - **Francesca Schiavone** (ITA) [6] def. Rebecca Marino (CAN) 6–3, 5–7, 9–7
    - **Victoria Azarenka** (BLR) [8] def. Andrea Hlaváčková (CZE) 6–4, 6–4
    - **Li Na** (CHN) [9] def. Evgeniya Rodina (RUS) 6–3, 6–2

=== January 18, 2011 (Tuesday) ===
==== Cricket ====
- Pakistan in New Zealand:
  - 2nd Test in Wellington, day 4: New Zealand 356 & 293 (90.5 overs); Pakistan 376. New Zealand lead by 273 runs.
- India in South Africa:
  - 3rd ODI in Cape Town: South Africa 220 (49.2 overs); India 223/8 (48.2 overs). **India win by 2 wickets; lead 5-match series 2–1.**

==== Cycling ====
- UCI World Tour:
  - Tour Down Under in Australia:
    - Stage 1, Mawson Lakes to Angaston, 138 km (86 mi): (gold) Matthew Goss (AUS) (HTC–Highroad) 3h 17' 08" (silver) André Greipel (GER) (Omega Pharma–Lotto) s.t. (bronze) Robbie McEwen (AUS) (Team RadioShack) s.t.
      - Overall standings: (1) Goss 3h 16' 58" (2) Greipel + 4" (3) McEwen + 6"

==== Football (soccer) ====
- AFC Asian Cup in Qatar: (teams in **bold** advance to the quarterfinals)
  - Group C:
    - **South Korea** 4–1 India
    - **Australia** 1–0 Bahrain
      - Final standings: Australia, South Korea 7 points, Bahrain 3, India 0.
- Central American Cup in Panama: (teams in **bold** advance to the semifinals and qualify for CONCACAF Gold Cup)
  - Group A:
    - Nicaragua 1–1 Belize
    - **Panama** 2–0 **El Salvador**
      - Final standings: Panama 9 points, El Salvador 6, Nicaragua, Belize 1.
  - Group B: **Honduras** 3–1 Guatemala
    - Final standings: Honduras, **Costa Rica** 4 points, Guatemala 0.

==== Handball ====
- World Men's Championship in Sweden: (teams in **bold** advance to main round)
  - Group B:
    - Japan 24–28 **Hungary**
    - **Norway** 26–25 Brazil
    - Austria 23–26 **Iceland**
      - Standings (after 4 games): Iceland 8 points, Hungary, Norway 6, Austria, Japan 2, Brazil 0.
  - Group D:
    - Chile 29–29 Slovakia
    - South Korea 20–25 **Poland**
    - **Sweden** 22–27 Argentina
      - Standings (after 4 games): Poland 8 points, Sweden 6, Argentina 5, South Korea 3, Slovakia, Chile 1.

==== Snowboarding ====
- World Championships in La Molina, Spain:
  - Men's snowboard cross: (gold) Alex Pullin (AUS) (silver) Seth Wescott (USA) (bronze) Nate Holland (USA)
    - Pullin becomes the first Australian world champion.
  - Women's snowboard cross: (gold) Lindsey Jacobellis (USA) (silver) Nelly Moenne Loccoz (FRA) (bronze) Dominique Maltais (CAN)
    - Jacobellis wins the title for the third time.

==== Tennis ====
- Australian Open in Melbourne, Australia, day 2:
  - Men's singles – 1st round:
    - **Rafael Nadal** (ESP) [1] def. Marcos Daniel (BRA) 6–0, 5–0 retired
    - **Robin Söderling** (SWE) [4] def. Potito Starace (ITA) 6–4, 6–2, 6–2
    - **Andy Murray** (GBR) [5] def. Karol Beck (SVK) 6–3, 6–1, 4–2 retired
    - **David Ferrer** (ESP) [7] def. Jarkko Nieminen (FIN) 6–4, 6–3, 1–6, 6–2
    - **Mikhail Youzhny** (RUS) [10] def. Marsel İlhan (TUR) 6–2, 6–3, 7–6(5)
  - Women's singles – 1st round:
    - **Vera Zvonareva** (RUS) [2] def. Sybille Bammer (AUT) 6–2, 6–1
    - **Kim Clijsters** (BEL) [3] def. Dinara Safina (RUS) 6–0, 6–0
    - **Samantha Stosur** (AUS) [5] def. Lauren Davis (USA) 6–1, 6–1
    - **Jelena Janković** (SRB) [7] def. Alla Kudryavtseva (RUS) 6–0, 7–6(5)
    - **Shahar Pe'er** (ISR) [10] def. Mathilde Johansson (FRA) 6–1, 6–1

=== January 17, 2011 (Monday) ===
==== Cricket ====
- Pakistan in New Zealand:
  - 2nd Test in Wellington, day 3: New Zealand 356 & 9/0 (5 overs); Pakistan 376 (133 overs). New Zealand trail by 11 runs with 10 wickets remaining.

==== Football (soccer) ====
- AFC Asian Cup in Qatar: (teams in **bold** advance to the quarterfinals)
  - Group B:
    - Saudi Arabia 0–5 **Japan**
    - **Jordan** 2–1 Syria
      - Final standings: Japan, Jordan 7 points, Syria 3, Saudi Arabia 0.
- South American Youth Championship in Peru:
  - Group B:
    - Colombia 1–1 Ecuador
    - Brazil 4–2 Paraguay

==== Handball ====
- World Men's Championship in Sweden: (teams in **bold** advance to the main round)
  - Group A:
    - Spain 26–24 Germany
    - **France** 41–17 Bahrain
    - Tunisia 23–27 Egypt
      - Standings (after 3 games): France, Spain 6 points, Germany 4, Egypt 2, Tunisia, Bahrain 0.
  - Group B:
    - Hungary 36–24 Brazil
    - Norway 33–27 Austria
    - Iceland 36–22 Japan
      - Standings (after 3 games): Iceland 6 points, Norway, Hungary 4, Japan, Austria 2, Brazil 0.
  - Group C:
    - **Croatia** 42–15 Australia
    - Romania 14–15 Algeria
    - Denmark 35–27 Serbia
      - Standings (after 3 games): Denmark, Croatia 6 points, Serbia 4, Algeria 2, Romania, Australia 0.
  - Group D:
    - Slovakia 18–23 Argentina
    - Poland 38–23 Chile
    - Sweden 30–24 South Korea
      - Standings (after 3 games): Sweden, Poland 6 points, South Korea, Argentina 3, Slovakia, Chile 0.

==== Tennis ====
- Australian Open in Melbourne, Australia, day 1:
  - Men's singles – 1st round:
    - **Roger Federer** (SUI) [2] def. Lukáš Lacko (SVK) 6–1, 6–1, 6–3
    - **Novak Djokovic** (SRB) [3] def. Marcel Granollers (ESP) 6–1, 6–3, 6–1
    - **Tomáš Berdych** (CZE) [6] def. Marco Crugnola (ITA) 6–4, 6–0, 6–2
    - **Andy Roddick** (USA) [8] def. Jan Hájek (CZE) 6–1, 6–2, 6–2
    - **Fernando Verdasco** (ESP) [9] def. Rainer Schüttler (GER) 6–1, 6–3, 6–2
  - Women's singles – 1st round:
    - **Caroline Wozniacki** (DEN) [1] def. Gisela Dulko (ARG) 6–3, 6–4
    - **Venus Williams** (USA) [4] def. Sara Errani (ITA) 6–3, 6–2
    - **Francesca Schiavone** (ITA) [6] def. Arantxa Parra Santonja (ESP) 6–7(4), 6–2, 6–4
    - **Victoria Azarenka** (BLR) [8] def. Kathrin Wörle (GER) 6–0, 6–2
    - **Li Na** (CHN) [9] def. Sofia Arvidsson (SWE) 6–1, 7–5

=== January 16, 2011 (Sunday) ===
==== Alpine skiing ====
- Men's World Cup in Wengen, Switzerland:
  - Slalom: (gold) Ivica Kostelić (CRO) 1:45.28 (52.46 / 52.82) (silver) Marcel Hirscher (AUT) 1:46.21 (52.37/ 53.84) (bronze) Jean-Baptiste Grange (FRA) 1:46.27 (52.49 / 53.78)
    - Slalom standings (after 5 of 10 races): (1) Kostelić 353 points (2) Hirscher 276 (3) André Myhrer (SWE) 213
    - Overall standings (after 18 of 38 races): (1) Kostelić 726 points (2) Aksel Lund Svindal (NOR) 511 (3) Silvan Zurbriggen (SUI) 469
- Women's World Cup in Maribor, Slovenia:
  - Slalom: Cancelled due to warm weather.

==== American football ====
- NFL playoffs – Divisional Playoffs:
  - NFC: Chicago Bears 35, Seattle Seahawks 24
  - AFC: New York Jets 28, New England Patriots 21

==== Auto racing ====
- Dakar Rally in Argentina and Chile:
  - Motorcycles: (gold) Marc Coma (ESP) (KTM) 51h 25' 00" (silver) Cyril Despres (FRA) (KTM) 51h 40' 04" (bronze) Hélder Rodrigues (POR) (Yamaha) 53h 05' 20"
    - Coma wins the event for the third time.
  - Cars: (gold) Nasser Al-Attiyah (QAT)/Timo Gottschalk (GER) (Volkswagen) 45h 16' 16" (silver) Giniel de Villiers (RSA)/Dirk von Zitzewitz (Volkswagen) 46h 05' 57" (bronze) Carlos Sainz (ESP)/Lucas Cruz (ESP) (Volkswagen) 46h 36' 54"
    - Al-Attiyah wins the event for the first time.
  - Trucks: (gold) Vladimir Chagin (RUS)/Sergey Savostin (RUS)/Ildar Shaysultanov (RUS) (KamAZ) 48h 28' 54" (silver) Firdaus Kabirov (RUS)/Aydar Belyaev (RUS)/Andrey Mokeev (RUS) (KamAZ) 48h 58' 58" (bronze) Eduard Nikolaev (RUS)/Viatcheslav Mizyukaev (RUS)/Vladimir Rybakov (RUS) (KamAZ) 51h 49' 11"
    - Chagin wins the event for a record seventh time.
  - All-terrain vehicles: (gold) Alejandro Patronelli (ARG) (Yamaha) 63h 49' 47" (silver) Sebastian Halpern (ARG) (Yamaha) 64h 49' 40" (bronze) Łukasz Łaskawiec (POL) (Yamaha) 70h 07' 25"
    - Patronelli wins the event for the first time, matching brother Marcos' feat from 2010.

==== Basketball ====
- (United Kingdom) BBL Cup Final in Birmingham, England:
  - Mersey Tigers 66–93 **Sheffield Sharks**
    - Sheffield win the Cup for the second successive season, and third time overall.

==== Biathlon ====
- World Cup 5 in Ruhpolding, Germany:
  - Men's 12.5 km Pursuit: (gold) Björn Ferry (SWE) 31:56.6 (0+0+0+0) (silver) Martin Fourcade (FRA) 32:01.5 (0+1+1+0) (bronze) Michael Greis (GER) 32:03.5 (0+0+0+0)
    - Pursuit standings (after 3 of 7 races): (1) Tarjei Bø (NOR) 146 points (2) Emil Hegle Svendsen (NOR) 130 (3) Fourcade 122
    - Overall standings (after 12 of 26 races): (1) Bø 572 points (2) Svendsen 533 (3) Fourcade 397
  - Women's 10 km Pursuit: (gold) Tora Berger (NOR) 28:50.9 (0+0+0+1) (silver) Andrea Henkel (GER) 29:28.6 (0+0+1+1) (bronze) Kaisa Mäkäräinen (FIN) 29:50.2 (2+0+0+0)
    - Pursuit standings (after 3 of 7 races): (1) Mäkäräinen 162 points (2) Helena Ekholm (SWE) 146 (3) Anna Carin Olofsson-Zidek (SWE) 126
    - Overall standings (after 12 of 26 races): (1) Mäkäräinen 541 points (2) Ekholm 499 (3) Henkel 454

==== Bobsleigh ====
- World Cup in Igls, Austria:
  - Four-man: (gold) Manuel Machata/Richard Adjei/Andreas Bredau/Christian Poser (GER) 1:42.92 (51.47 / 51.45) (silver) Thomas Florschütz/Ronny Listner/Kevin Kuske/Andreas Barucha (GER) 1:42.97 (51.52 / 51.45) (bronze) Steve Holcomb/Justin Olsen/Steven Langton/Curtis Tomasevicz (USA) 1:43.02 (51.47 / 51.55)
    - Standings (after 5 of 8 races): (1) Machata 1036 points (2) Holcomb 1010 (3) Karl Angerer (GER) 922

==== Cricket ====
- Pakistan in New Zealand:
  - 2nd Test in Wellington, day 2: New Zealand 356 (127.1 overs; Daniel Vettori 110); Pakistan 134/2 (49.5 overs). Pakistan trail by 222 runs with 8 wickets remaining in the 1st innings.
- England in Australia:
  - 1st ODI in Melbourne: England 294 (49.4 overs); Australia 297/4 (49.1 overs; Shane Watson 161*). **Australia win by 6 wickets; lead 7-match series 1–0.**

==== Cross-country skiing ====
- World Cup in Liberec, Czech Republic:
  - Men's Team Sprint Classic: (gold) Norway I (Johan Kjølstad, Ola Vigen Hattestad) 21:47.1 (silver) Sweden I (Jesper Modin, Mats Larsson) 21:51.5 (bronze) Norway II (Eirik Brandsdal, John Kristian Dahl) 21:55.2
  - Women's Team Sprint Classic: (gold) Norway I (Maiken Caspersen Falla, Marit Bjørgen) 19:30.8 (silver) Italy I (Magda Genuin, Marianna Longa) 20:01.3 (bronze) Norway II (Kari Vikhagen Gjeitnes, Celine Brun-Lie) 20:14.4

==== Football (soccer) ====
- AFC Asian Cup in Qatar: (teams in **bold** advance to the quarterfinals)
  - Group A:
    - **Qatar** 3–0 Kuwait
    - China 2–2 **Uzbekistan**
      - Final standings: Uzbekistan 7 points, Qatar 6, China 4, Kuwait 0.
- Central American Cup in Panama: (teams in **bold** advance to the semifinals and qualify for CONCACAF Gold Cup)
  - Group A:
    - Belize 2–5 **El Salvador**
    - **Panama** 2–0 Nicaragua
      - Standings (after 2 matches): El Salvador, Panama 6 points, Nicaragua, Belize 0.
  - Group B: Guatemala 0–2 **Costa Rica**
    - Standings: Costa Rica 4 points (2 matches), Honduras 1 (1), Guatemala 0 (1).
- South American Youth Championship in Peru:
  - Group A:
    - Argentina 2–1 Uruguay
    - Peru 0–2 Chile

==== Freestyle skiing ====
- World Cup in Les Contamines-Montjoie, France:
  - Ski Cross men: (gold) Christopher Del Bosco (CAN) (silver) Andreas Matt (AUT) (bronze) Egor Korotkov (RUS)
    - Ski Cross standings (after 5 of 11 events): (1) Matt 319 points (2) Del Bosco 225 (3) Alex Fiva (SUI) 199
  - Ski Cross women: (gold) Ophélie David (FRA) (silver) Kelsey Serwa (CAN) (bronze) Anna Holmlund (SWE)
    - Ski Cross standings (after 5 of 11 events): (1) Serwa 329 points (2) Heidi Zacher (GER) 296 (3) Fanny Smith (SUI) 255
- World Cup in Mont Gabriel, Canada:
  - Aerials men: (gold) Anton Kushnir (BLR) 247.60 points (silver) Qi Guangpu (CHN) 240.97 (bronze) Stanislav Kravchuk (UKR) 234.60
    - Aerials standings (after 3 of 8 events): (1) Jia Zongyang (CHN) 220 points (2) Qi 216 (3) Kushnir 168
    - Overall standings: (1) Andreas Matt (AUT) 64 points (2) Guilbaut Colas (FRA) 60 (3) Mikaël Kingsbury (CAN) 55
  - Aerials women: (gold) Xu Mengtao (CHN) 192.28 points (silver) Alla Tsuper (BLR) 187.00 (bronze) Cheng Shuang (CHN) 186.99
    - Aerials standings (after 3 of 8 events): (1) Xu 280 points (2) Cheng 200 (3) Zhang Xin (CHN) 162
    - Overall standings: (1) Kelsey Serwa (CAN) 66 points (2) Hannah Kearney (USA) 62 (3) Heidi Zacher (GER) 59

==== Golf ====
- PGA Tour:
  - Sony Open in Hawaii in Honolulu, Hawaii:
    - Winner: Mark Wilson (USA) 264 (−16)
      - Wilson wins his third PGA Tour title.
- European Tour:
  - Joburg Open in Johannesburg, South Africa:
    - Winner: Charl Schwartzel (RSA) 265 (−19)
      - Schwartzel defends his title, and wins his sixth European Tour title.

==== Handball ====
- World Men's Championship in Sweden:
  - Group A:
    - Bahrain 18–38 Germany
    - Tunisia 18–21 Spain
    - Egypt 19–28 France
      - Standings (after 2 games): Germany, France, Spain 4 points, Egypt, Tunisia, Bahrain 0.
  - Group C:
    - Australia 18–35 Serbia
    - Algeria 15–26 Croatia
    - Romania 30–39 Denmark
      - Standings (after 2 games): Denmark, Serbia, Croatia 4 points, Algeria, Romania, Australia 0.

==== Luge ====
- World Cup in Oberhof, Germany:
  - Women: (gold) Tatjana Hüfner (GER) 1:26.366 (43.239 / 43.127) (silver) Natalie Geisenberger (GER) 1:26.775 (43.491 / 43.284) (bronze) Anke Wischnewski (GER) 1:27.298 (43.677 / 43.621)
    - Standings (after 6 of 9 events): (1) Hüfner 585 points (2) Geisenberger 475 (3) Wischnewski 415
    - Hüfner wins her fifth race of the season.
  - Team relay: (gold) Germany (Tatjana Hüfner/Felix Loch/Tobias Wendl/Tobias Arlt) 2:27.306 (47.906 / 49.468 / 49.932) (silver) Russia (Tatiana Ivanova/Viktor Kneib/Vladislav Yuzhakov/Vladimir Makhnutin) 2:28.714 (48.785 / 49.837 / 50.092) (bronze) Italy (Sandra Gasparini/David Mair/Christian Oberstolz/Patrick Gruber) 2:29.047 (49.153 / 49.962 / 49.932)
    - Standings (after 4 of 6 events): (1) Germany 400 points (2) Italy 295 (3) Austria 256

==== Nordic combined ====
- World Cup in Seefeld, Austria:
  - HS 106 / 10 km: (gold) Magnus Moan (NOR) 24:36.8 (silver) Jason Lamy-Chappuis (FRA) 24:38.4 (bronze) David Kreiner (AUT) 24:39.4
    - Standings (after 9 of 13 races): (1) Lamy-Chappuis 639 points (2) Mikko Kokslien (NOR) 469 (3) Mario Stecher (AUT) 466

==== Rugby union ====
- Heineken Cup pool stage, matchday 5 (teams in **bold** advance to the knockout stage):
  - Pool 3:
    - London Irish (England) 24–12 (Wales) Ospreys
    - **Toulon** (France) 32–16 (Ireland) Munster
      - Standings (after 5 matches): Toulon 17 points, Munster 11, Ospreys 10, London Irish 9.
      - Munster fail to reach the quarter-final stage of the competition for the first time since 1997–98.
  - Pool 6: Glasgow Warriors (Scotland) 20–10 (England) London Wasps
    - Standings (after 5 matches): (France) **Toulouse** 21 points, London Wasps 15, Glasgow Warriors 8, (Wales) Newport Gwent Dragons 1.
- Amlin Challenge Cup pool stage, matchday 5 (team in **bold** advances to the knockout stage):
  - Pool 4: **Stade Français** (France) 39–10 (England) Leeds Carnegie
    - Standings (after 5 matches): Stade Français 24 points, Leeds Carnegie 14, (Romania) București Oaks, (Italy) Crociati Parma 5.

==== Short track speed skating ====
- European Championships in Heerenveen, Netherlands:
  - Men: (gold) Thibaut Fauconnet (FRA) 136 points (silver) Haralds Silovs (LAT) 50 (bronze) Sjinkie Knegt (NED) 47
    - Fauconnet wins the title for the first time, and becomes the first French champion in 10 years.
  - Women: (gold) Arianna Fontana (ITA) 115 points (silver) Bernadett Heidum (HUN) 42 (bronze) Martina Valcepina (ITA) 39
    - Fontana wins her third title in four years.
  - Men's 5000 m relay: (gold) Netherlands 6:54.608 (silver) Russia 6:54.726 (bronze) Great Britain 6:56.025
  - Women's 3000 m relay: (gold) Netherlands 4:19.253 (silver) Hungary 4:19.284 (bronze) Italy 4:20.473

==== Ski jumping ====
- World Cup in Sapporo, Japan:
  - HS 134: (gold) Andreas Kofler (AUT) 232.9 points (silver) Severin Freund (GER) 224.7 (bronze) Thomas Morgenstern (AUT) 222.4
    - Standings (after 15 of 26 events): (1) Morgenstern 1223 points (2) Kofler 771 (3) Simon Ammann (SUI) 753

==== Snooker ====
- Masters in London, England
  - Final: **Ding Junhui** (CHN) [9] 10–4 Marco Fu (HKG) [16]
    - Ding wins his seventh professional title.
    - This is the first All-Asian final.

=== January 15, 2011 (Saturday) ===
==== Alpine skiing ====
- Men's World Cup in Wengen, Switzerland:
  - Downhill: (gold) Klaus Kröll (AUT) 2:31.28 (silver) Didier Cuche (SUI) 2:31.42 (bronze) Carlo Janka (SUI) 2:31.67
    - Downhill standings (after 4 of 9 races): (1) Michael Walchhofer (AUT) 269 points (2) Silvan Zurbriggen (SUI) 250 (3) Kröll 190
    - Overall standings (after 17 of 38 races): (1) Ivica Kostelić (CRO) 626 points (2) Aksel Lund Svindal (NOR) 511 (3) Zurbriggen 459
- Women's World Cup in Maribor, Slovenia:
  - Giant slalom: Cancelled during 1st run due to warm weather.

==== American football ====
- NFL playoffs – Divisional Playoffs:
  - AFC: Pittsburgh Steelers 31, Baltimore Ravens 24
  - NFC: Green Bay Packers 48, Atlanta Falcons 21

==== Biathlon ====
- World Cup 5 in Ruhpolding, Germany:
  - Women's 7.5 km Sprint: (gold) Tora Berger (NOR) 20:33.3 (0+0) (silver) Andrea Henkel (GER) 20:34.4 (0+0) (bronze) Magdalena Neuner (GER) 20:49.1 (0+1)
    - Standings (after 5 of 10 races): (1) Kaisa Mäkäräinen (FIN) 230 points (2) Neuner 198 (3) Darya Domracheva (BLR) 192
    - Overall standings (after 11 of 26 races): (1) Mäkäräinen 493 points (2) Helena Ekholm (SWE) 461 (3) Henkel 400

==== Bobsleigh ====
- World Cup in Igls, Austria:
  - Two-man: (gold) Beat Hefti/Thomas Lamparter (SUI) 1:44.31 (52.21 / 52.10) (silver) Alexandr Zubkov/Alexey Voyevoda (RUS) 1:44.54 (52.30 / 52.24) (bronze) Simone Bertazzo/Matteo Torchio (ITA) 1:44.97 (52.56 / 52.41)
    - Standings (after 5 of 8 races): (1) Zubkov 1013 points (2) Manuel Machata (GER) 1003 (3) Bertazzo 947
  - Team: (gold) Canada (John Fairbairn, Helen Upperton/Diane Kelly, Darla Deschamps, Lyndon Rush/Cody Sorensen) 3:37.09 (54.23 / 54.61 / 55.29 / 52.96) (silver) Austria (Matthias Guggenberger, Christina Hengster/Anna Feichtner, Janine Flock, Jürgen Loacker/Johannes Wipplinger) 3:37.13 (53.94 / 54.35 / 55.83 / 53.01) (bronze) Russia (Aleksandr Tretyakov, Olga Fyodorova/Yulia Timofeeva, Olga Potelicina, Alexander Kasjanov/Alexander Shilkin) 3:37.56 (53.92 / 54.65 / 55.51 / 53.48)

==== Cricket ====
- Pakistan in New Zealand:
  - 2nd Test in Wellington, day 1: New Zealand 246/6 (90 overs); Pakistan.
- India in South Africa:
  - 2nd ODI in Johannesburg: India 190 (47.2 overs); South Africa 189 (43 overs). **India win by 1 run; 5-match series tied 1–1.**

==== Cross-country skiing ====
- World Cup in Liberec, Czech Republic:
  - Men's Sprint Freestyle: (gold) Ola Vigen Hattestad (NOR) 2:55.3 (silver) Federico Pellegrino (ITA) 2:56.3 (bronze) Dušan Kožíšek (CZE) 2:58.3
    - Sprint standings (after 6 of 11 races): (1) Emil Jönsson (SWE) 280 points (2) Hattestad 184 (3) Jesper Modin (SWE) & Fulvio Scola (ITA) 180
    - Overall standings (after 19 of 31 races): (1) Dario Cologna (SUI) 1197 points (2) Petter Northug (NOR) 706 (3) Lukáš Bauer (CZE) 698
  - Women's Sprint Freestyle: (gold) Kikkan Randall (USA) 2:37.6 (silver) Hanna Falk (SWE) 2:38.1 (bronze) Celine Brun-Lie (NOR) 2:38.2
    - Sprint standings (after 6 of 11 races): (1) Randall 291 points (2) Arianna Follis (ITA) 288 (3) Petra Majdič (SVN) 254
    - Overall standings (after 19 of 31 races): (1) Justyna Kowalczyk (POL) 1271 points (2) Follis 880 (3) Marit Bjørgen (NOR) 796

==== Football (soccer) ====
- AFC Asian Cup in Qatar: (teams in **bold** advance to the quarterfinals)
  - Group D:
    - **Iran** 1–0 North Korea
    - United Arab Emirates 0–1 Iraq
      - Standings (after 2 matches): Iran 6 points, Iraq 3, United Arab Emirates, North Korea 1.
- OFC Champions League Group stage, matchday 3:
  - Group A: Lautoka (Fiji) 0–0 (Papua New Guinea) PRK Hekari United
    - Standings (after 3 matches): Lautoka 7 points, (Vanuatu) Amicale 6, PRK Hekari United 4, (Solomon Islands) Koloale 0.

==== Freestyle skiing ====
- World Cup in Mont Gabriel, Canada:
  - Dual Moguls men: (gold) Alexandre Bilodeau (CAN) 21.00 points (silver) Mikaël Kingsbury (CAN) 14.00 (bronze) Guilbaut Colas (FRA) 21.00
    - Moguls standings (after 4 of 11 events): (1) Colas 300 points (2) Kingsbury 275 (3) Patrick Deneen (USA) 247
    - Overall standings: (1) Colas 60 points (2) Kingsbury 55 (3) Deneen 49
  - Dual Moguls women: (gold) Justine Dufour-Lapointe (CAN) 22.00 (silver) Anastassia Gunchenko (RUS) 13.00 (bronze) Jennifer Heil (CAN) 21.00
    - Moguls standings (after 4 of 11 events): (1) Hannah Kearney (USA) 309 points (2) Heil 260 (3) Dufour-Lapointe 205
    - Overall standings: (1) Kearney 62 points (2) Heil & Heidi Zacher (GER) 52

==== Handball ====
- World Men's Championship in Sweden:
  - Group B:
    - Hungary 26–23 Norway
    - Japan 33–30 Austria
    - Brazil 26–34 Iceland
      - Standings (after 2 games): Iceland 4 points, Austria, Norway, Japan, Hungary 2, Brazil 0.
  - Group D:
    - Chile 22–37 South Korea
    - Slovakia 22–38 Sweden
    - Argentina 23–24 Poland
      - Standings (after 2 games): Sweden, Poland 4 points, South Korea 3, Argentina 1, Slovakia, Chile 0.

==== Luge ====
- World Cup in Oberhof, Germany:
  - Doubles: (gold) Tobias Wendl/Tobias Arlt (GER) 1:26.794 (43.386 / 43.408) (silver) Christian Oberstolz/Patrick Gruber (ITA) 1:26.833 (43.355 / 43.478) (bronze) Toni Eggert/Sascha Benecken (GER) 1:26.988 (43.624 / 43.364)
    - Standings (after 6 of 9 events): (1) Wendl/Arlt 530 points (2) Oberstolz/Gruber 485 (3) Andreas Linger/Wolfgang Linger (AUT) 392
    - Wendl/Arlt win their fourth race of the season.
  - Men's singles: (gold) Felix Loch (GER) 1:30.883 (45.543 / 45.340) (silver) Andi Langenhan (GER) 1:31.115 (45.523 / 45.592) (bronze) David Möller (GER) 1:31.326 (45.821 / 45.505)
    - Standings (after 6 of 9 events): (1) Armin Zöggeler (ITA) 525 points (2) Loch 445 (3) Möller 394

==== Nordic combined ====
- World Cup in Seefeld, Austria:
  - HS 106 / 10 km: (gold) Jason Lamy-Chappuis (FRA) 25:33.2 (silver) Magnus Moan (NOR) 26:02.5 (bronze) Mikko Kokslien (NOR) 26:06.1
    - Standings (after 8 of 13 races): (1) Lamy-Chappuis 559 points (2) Mario Stecher (AUT) 466 (3) Kokslien 447

==== Rugby union ====
- Heineken Cup pool stage, matchday 5 (team in **bold** advances to the knockout stages, teams in ~~strike~~ are eliminated):
  - Pool 2: **Leinster** (Ireland) 43–20 (England) ~~Saracens~~
    - Standings (after 5 matches): Leinster 19 points, (France) Clermont 14, (France) ~~Racing Métro~~ 9, Saracens 6.
  - Pool 4:
    - Bath (England) 55–16 (Italy) ~~Aironi~~
    - Ulster (Ireland) 9–6 (France) Biarritz
      - Standings (after 5 matches): Biarritz 17 points (6–4 in head-to head competition points), Ulster 17 (4–6), Bath 13, Aironi 4.
  - Pool 5:
    - ~~Benetton Treviso~~ (Italy) 9–44 (France) Perpignan
    - Scarlets (Wales) 18–32 (England) Leicester Tigers
      - Standings (after 5 matches): Perpignan 17 points (6–3 in head-to head competition points), Leicester Tigers 17 (3–6), Scarlets 15, Benetton Treviso 1.
  - Pool 6: **Toulouse** (France) 17–3 (Wales) ~~Newport Gwent Dragons~~
    - Standings: Toulouse 21 points (5 matches), (England) London Wasps 15 (4), (Scotland) Glasgow Warriors 4 (4), Newport Gwent Dragons 1 (5).
- Amlin Challenge Cup pool stage, matchday 5: (teams in ~~strike~~ are eliminated)
  - Pool 1:
    - ~~Cavalieri Prato~~ (Italy) 16–48 (England) Harlequins
    - Bayonne (France) 21–35 (Ireland) ~~Connacht~~
      - Standings (after 5 matches): Harlequins 19 points, Bayonne 15, Connacht 10, Cavalieri Prato 4.
  - Pool 3: Exeter Chiefs (England) 17–6 (France) ~~Bourgoin~~
    - Standings (after 5 matches): (France) Montpellier 17 points, Exeter Chiefs 15, (England) ~~Newcastle Falcons~~ 9, Bourgoin 6.
  - Pool 4: ~~Crociati Parma~~ (Italy) 16–12 (Romania) ~~București Oaks~~
    - Standings: (France) Stade Français 19 points (4 matches), (England) Leeds Carnegie 14 (4), București Oaks, Crociati Parma 5 (5).
  - Pool 5: (Italy) ~~Rovigo~~ 7–55 (England) Gloucester
    - Standings (after 5 matches): (France) La Rochelle 19 points, Gloucester 16, (France) Agen 15, Rovigo 0.

==== Skeleton ====
- World Cup in Igls, Austria:
  - Men: (gold) Martins Dukurs (LAT) 1:45.95 (52.95 / 53.00) (silver) Sergey Chudinov (RUS) 1:46.75 (53.41 / 53.34) (bronze) Aleksandr Tretyakov (RUS) 1:46.89 (53.55 / 53.34)
    - Standings (after 5 of 8 events): (1) Dukurs 1044 points (2) Tretyakov 955 (3) Sandro Stielicke (GER) 906
  - Team: (gold) Canada (John Fairbairn, Helen Upperton/Diane Kelly, Darla Deschamps, Lyndon Rush/Cody Sorensen) 3:37.09 (54.23 / 54.61 / 55.29 / 52.96) (silver) Austria (Matthias Guggenberger, Christina Hengster/Anna Feichtner, Janine Flock, Jürgen Loacker/Johannes Wipplinger) 3:37.13 (53.94 / 54.35 / 55.83 / 53.01) (bronze) Russia (Aleksandr Tretyakov, Olga Fyodorova/Yulia Timofeeva, Olga Potelicina, Alexander Kasjanov/Alexander Shilkin) 3:37.56 (53.92 / 54.65 / 55.51 / 53.48)

==== Ski jumping ====
- World Cup in Sapporo, Japan:
  - HS 134: (gold) Severin Freund (GER) 249.6 points (silver) Thomas Morgenstern (AUT) 248.2 (bronze) Adam Małysz (POL) 240.5
    - Standings (after 14 of 26 events): (1) Morgenstern 1163 points (2) Simon Ammann (SUI) 721 (3) Andreas Kofler (AUT) 671

==== Snooker ====
- Masters in London, England, Semi-finals:
  - **Marco Fu** (HKG) [16] 6–4 Mark Allen (NIR) [12]
  - Jamie Cope (ENG) [14] 3–6 **Ding Junhui** (CHN) [9]

==== Snowboarding ====
- World Championships in Barcelona, Spain:
  - Men's big air: (gold) Petja Piiroinen (FIN) 51.7 points (silver) Zachary Stone (CAN) 48.9 (bronze) Seppe Smits (BEL) 48.9

==== Tennis ====
- ATP World Tour:
  - Medibank International Sydney:
    - Final: **Gilles Simon** (FRA) def. Viktor Troicki (SRB) 7–5, 7–6(4)
      - Simon wins the eighth title of his career.
  - Heineken Open in Auckland, New Zealand:
    - Final: **David Ferrer** (ESP) def. David Nalbandian (ARG) 6–3, 6–2
      - Ferrer wins the tenth title of his career.
- WTA Tour:
  - Moorilla Hobart International:
    - Final: **Jarmila Groth** (AUS) def. Bethanie Mattek-Sands (USA) 6–4, 6–3
      - Groth wins the second title of her career.
- Exhibition tournament:
  - AAMI Classic in Melbourne, Australia:
    - Final: **Lleyton Hewitt** (AUS) def. Gaël Monfils (FRA) 7–5, 6–3
      - Hewitt wins the event for the first time.

=== January 14, 2011 (Friday) ===
==== Alpine skiing ====
- Men's World Cup in Wengen, Switzerland:
  - Super combined: (gold) Ivica Kostelić (CRO) 2:40.44 (silver) Carlo Janka (SUI) 2:41.02 (bronze) Aksel Lund Svindal (NOR) 2:41.78
    - Overall standings (after 16 of 38 races): (1) Kostelić 604 points (2) Svindal 495 (3) Silvan Zurbriggen (SUI) 439

==== Biathlon ====
- World Cup 5 in Ruhpolding, Germany:
  - Men's 10 km Sprint: (gold) Lars Berger (NOR) 23:55.1 (0+0) (silver) Martin Fourcade (FRA) 24:16.8 (0+0) (bronze) Ivan Tcherezov (RUS) 24:18.9 (0+0)
    - Sprint standings (after 5 of 10 races): (1) Tarjei Bø (NOR) 254 points (2) Emil Hegle Svendsen (NOR) 204 (3) Michael Greis (GER) 168
    - Overall standings (after 11 of 26 races): (1) Bø 529 points (2) Svendsen 497 (3) Ole Einar Bjørndalen (NOR) 362

==== Bobsleigh ====
- World Cup in Igls, Austria:
  - Women: (gold) Shauna Rohbock/Valerie Fleming (USA) 1:48.50 (54.45 / 54.05) (silver) Anja Schneiderheinze-Stöckel/Christin Senkel (GER) 1:48.59 (54.43 / 54.16) (bronze) Fabienne Meyer/Hanne Schenk (SUI) 1:48.70 (54.36 / 54.34)
    - Standings (after 5 of 8 races): (1) Sandra Kiriasis (GER) 1061 points (2) Cathleen Martini (GER) 1003 (3) Meyer 896

==== Cricket ====
- England in Australia:
  - 2nd T20I in Melbourne: Australia 147/7 (20 overs); England 143/6 (20 overs). **Australia win by 4 runs; 2-match series drawn 1–1.**

==== Football (soccer) ====
- AFC Asian Cup in Qatar: (teams in ~~strike~~ are eliminated)
  - Group C:
    - Australia 1–1 South Korea
    - Bahrain 5–2 ~~India~~
      - Standings (after 2 matches): Australia, South Korea 4 points, Bahrain 3, India 0.
- Central American Cup in Panama:
  - Group A:
    - El Salvador 2–0 Nicaragua
    - Panama 2–0 Belize
  - Group B: Costa Rica 1–1 Honduras

==== Handball ====
- World Men's Championship in Sweden:
  - Group A:
    - France 32–19 Tunisia
    - Germany 30–25 Egypt
    - Spain 33–22 Bahrain
  - Group B:
    - Iceland 32–26 Hungary
    - Norway 35–29 Japan
    - Austria 34–24 Brazil
  - Group C:
    - Croatia 27–21 Romania
    - Denmark 47–12 Australia
    - Serbia 25–24 Algeria
  - Group D:
    - South Korea 25–25 Argentina
    - Poland 35–33 Slovakia

==== Nordic combined ====
- World Cup in Seefeld, Austria:
  - HS 106 / 4 x 5 km: (gold) Norway (Magnus Moan, Håvard Klemetsen, Jan Schmid, Mikko Kokslien) 47:31.2 (silver) Austria (Felix Gottwald, Wilhelm Denifl, David Kreiner, Bernhard Gruber) 47:43.1 (bronze) France (François Braud, Maxime Laheurte, Sébastien Lacroix, Jason Lamy-Chappuis) 48:19.1

==== Rugby union ====
- Heineken Cup pool stage, matchday 5 (team in **bold** advances to the knockout stage):
  - Pool 1:
    - Cardiff Blues (Wales) 14–9 (France) Castres
    - **Northampton Saints** (England) 37–0 (Scotland) Edinburgh
      - Standings (after 5 matches): Northampton Saints 21 points, Castres 11, Cardiff Blues 10, Edinburgh 7.
  - Pool 2: Clermont (France) 28–17 (France) Racing Métro
    - Standings: (Ireland) Leinster 14 points (4 matches), Clermont 14 (5), Racing Métro 9 (5), (England) Saracens 6 (4).
- Amlin Challenge Cup pool stage, matchday 5 (team in **bold** advances to the knockout stage; teams in ~~strike~~ are eliminated):
  - Pool 2:
    - **Brive** (France) 52–3 (Spain) ~~El Salvador~~
    - ~~Sale Sharks~~ (England) 54–0 (Italy) ~~Petrarca Padova~~
      - Standings (after 5 matches): Brive 23 points, Sale Sharks 16, Petrarca Padova 5, El Salvador 4.
  - Pool 3: ~~Newcastle Falcons~~ (England) 0–6 (France) Montpellier
    - Standings: Montpellier 17 points (5 matches), (England) Exeter Chiefs 11 (4), Newcastle Falcons 9 (5), (France) ~~Bourgoin~~ 6 (4).

==== Skeleton ====
- World Cup in Igls, Austria:
  - Women: (gold) Anja Huber (GER) 1:51.10 (55.34 / 55.76) (silver) Shelley Rudman (GBR) 1:51.27 (55.69 / 55.58) (bronze) Mellisa Hollingsworth (CAN) 1:51.45 (55.70 / 55.75)
    - Standings (after 5 of 8 events): (1) Huber 1075 points (2) Rudman 1024 (3) Hollingsworth 978

==== Snooker ====
- Masters in London, England, Quarter-finals:
  - **Mark Allen** (NIR) [12] 6–4 Neil Robertson (AUS) [2]
  - Peter Ebdon (ENG) [13] 0–6 **Marco Fu** (HKG) [16]

==== Tennis ====
- WTA Tour:
  - Medibank International Sydney in Sydney, Australia:
    - Final: **Li Na** (CHN) def. Kim Clijsters (BEL) 7–6(3), 6–3
      - Li wins the 4th title of her career.

=== January 13, 2011 (Thursday) ===
==== Biathlon ====
- World Cup 5 in Ruhpolding, Germany:
  - Women's 15 km Individual: (gold) Olga Zaitseva (RUS) 41:46.1 (0+0+0+0) (silver) Andrea Henkel (GER) 42:00.6 (0+0+0+0) (bronze) Helena Ekholm (SWE) 42:23.5 (0+0+0+0)
    - Individual standings (after 3 of 4 races): (1) Zaitseva 138 points (2) Marie-Laure Brunet (FRA) 132 (3) Valj Semerenko (UKR) 129
    - Overall standings (after 10 of 26 races): (1) Kaisa Mäkäräinen (FIN) 459 points (2) Ekholm 429 (3) Brunet 354

==== Football (soccer) ====
- AFC Asian Cup in Qatar: (teams in ~~strike~~ are eliminated)
  - Group B:
    - Jordan 1–0 ~~Saudi Arabia~~
    - Syria 1–2 Japan
      - Standings (after 2 matches): Japan, Jordan 4 points, Syria 3, Saudi Arabia 0.

==== Handball ====
- World Men's Championship in Sweden:
  - Group D: Sweden 28–18 Chile

==== Rugby union ====
- Amlin Challenge Cup pool stage, matchday 5: (teams in ~~strike~~ are eliminated)
  - Pool 5: Agen (France) 17–28 (France) La Rochelle
    - Standings: La Rochelle 19 points (5 matches), Agen 15 (5), (England) Gloucester 11 (4), (Italy) ~~Rovigo~~ 0 (4).

==== Snooker ====
- Masters in London, England, Quarter-finals:
  - **Ding Junhui** (CHN) [9] 6–2 Graeme Dott (SCO) [11]
  - Mark King (ENG) [15] 1–6 **Jamie Cope** (ENG) [14]

=== January 12, 2011 (Wednesday) ===
==== Biathlon ====
- World Cup 5 in Ruhpolding, Germany:
  - Men's 20 km Individual: (gold) Emil Hegle Svendsen (NOR) 50:39.4 (0+0+0+1) (silver) Martin Fourcade (FRA) 50:46.8 (0+0+0+1) (bronze) Dominik Landertinger (AUT) 51:03.1 (0+0+0+1)
    - Individual standings (after 3 of 4 races): (1) Svendsen 145 points (2) Tarjei Bø (NOR) 112 (3) Daniel Mesotitsch (AUT) 109
    - Overall standings (after 10 of 26 races): (1) Bø 489 points (2) Svendsen 454 (3) Ole Einar Bjørndalen (NOR) 338

==== Cricket ====
- India in South Africa:
  - 1st ODI in Durban: South Africa 289/9 (50 overs); India 154 (35.4 overs). **South Africa win by 135 runs; lead 5-match series 1–0.**
- England in Australia:
  - 1st T20I in Adelaide: Australia 157/4 (20 overs); England 158/9 (20 overs). **England win by 1 wicket; lead 2-match series 1–0.**
    - England produce a record eighth win in a row in Twenty20 Internationals.

==== Football (soccer) ====
- AFC Asian Cup in Qatar:
  - Group A:
    - Uzbekistan 2–1 Kuwait
    - China 0–2 Qatar
      - Standings (after 2 matches): Uzbekistan 6 points, China, Qatar 3, Kuwait 0.

==== Freestyle skiing ====
- World Cup in Alpe d'Huez, France:
  - Ski Cross men: (gold) Daniel Bohnacker (GER) (silver) Andreas Matt (AUT) (bronze) Patrick Koller (AUT)
    - Ski Cross standings (after 4 of 11 races): (1) Matt 239 points (2) Nick Zoricic (CAN) 194 (3) John Teller (USA) 170
    - Overall standings: (1) Guilbaut Colas (FRA) & Matt 48 points (3) Patrick Deneen (USA) 40
  - Ski Cross women: (gold) Kelsey Serwa (CAN) (silver) Fanny Smith (SUI) (bronze) Ashleigh McIvor (CAN)
    - Ski Cross standings (after 4 of 11 races): (1) Heidi Zacher (GER) 260 points (2) Serwa 249 (3) Smith 247
    - Overall standings: (1) Hannah Kearney (USA) 56 points (2) Zacher 52 (3) Serwa 50

==== Snooker ====
- Masters in London, England, Last 16:
  - **Neil Robertson** (AUS) [2] 6–3 Stephen Hendry (SCO) [10]
  - Shaun Murphy (ENG) [8] 3–6 **Jamie Cope** (ENG) [14]

=== January 11, 2011 (Tuesday) ===
==== Alpine skiing ====
- Women's World Cup in Flachau, Austria:
  - Slalom: (gold) Maria Riesch (GER) & Tanja Poutiainen (FIN) 1:42.52 (bronze) Nastasia Noens (FRA) 1:43.04
    - Slalom standings (after 6 of 10 races): (1) Riesch 420 points (2) Marlies Schild (AUT) & Poutiainen 400
    - Overall standings (after 18 of 38 races): (1) Riesch 1023 points (2) Lindsey Vonn (USA) 827 (3) Poutiainen 580

==== Football (soccer) ====
- AFC Asian Cup in Qatar:
  - Group D:
    - North Korea 0–0 United Arab Emirates
    - Iraq 1–2 Iran

==== Snooker ====
- Masters in London, England, Last 16:
  - Ronnie O'Sullivan (ENG) [7] 4–6 **Mark Allen** (NIR) [12]
  - Stephen Maguire (SCO) [6] 4–6 **Marco Fu** (HKG) [16]

=== January 10, 2011 (Monday) ===
==== American football ====
- NCAA bowl games – Bowl Championship Series:
  - BCS National Championship Game in Glendale, Arizona: **Auburn** 22, Oregon 19
    - Wes Byrum's 19-yard field goal as time expires gives the Tigers their first undisputed national championship.
    - A SEC school wins the championship for the fifth consecutive year.

==== Football (soccer) ====
- AFC Asian Cup in Qatar:
  - Group C:
    - India 0–4 Australia
    - South Korea 2–1 Bahrain
- FIFA Ballon d'Or:
  - Lionel Messi of FC Barcelona is named player of the year, ahead of his two teammates Andrés Iniesta and Xavi.
  - Marta of FC Gold Pride (now defunct) and Santos is named women's world player of the year for the fifth consecutive time.
  - José Mourinho (Internazionale and Real Madrid) and Silvia Neid (Germany) are named men's and women's coaches of the year respectively.

==== Snooker ====
- Masters in London, England, Last 16:
  - Mark Williams (WAL) [5] 4–6 **Ding Junhui** (CHN) [9]
  - John Higgins (SCO) [4] 4–6 **Graeme Dott** (SCO) [11]

=== January 9, 2011 (Sunday) ===
==== Alpine skiing ====
- Men's World Cup in Adelboden, Switzerland:
  - Slalom: (gold) Ivica Kostelić (CRO) 1:50.90 (silver) Marcel Hirscher (AUT) 1:51.16 (bronze) Reinfried Herbst (AUT) 1:52.19
    - Slalom standings (after 4 of 10 races): (1) Kostelić 253 points (2) André Myhrer (SWE) 204 (3) Hirscher 196
    - Overall standings (after 15 of 38 races): (1) Kostelić 504 points (2) Aksel Lund Svindal (NOR) 435 (3) Silvan Zurbriggen (SUI) 421
- Women's World Cup in Zauchensee, Austria:
  - Super-G: (gold) Lara Gut (SUI) 1:12.82 (silver) Lindsey Vonn (USA) 1:13.35 (bronze) Dominique Gisin (SUI) 1:13.54
    - Super G standings (after 2 of 7 races): (1) Vonn 180 points (2) Maria Riesch (GER) 120 (3) Gut 100
    - Overall standings (after 17 of 38 races): (1) Riesch 923 points (2) Vonn 827 (3) Elisabeth Görgl (AUT) 565

==== American football ====
- NFL playoffs – Wild Card Weekend:
  - AFC: Baltimore Ravens 30, Kansas City Chiefs 7
  - NFC: Green Bay Packers 21, Philadelphia Eagles 16
- NCAA bowl games:
  - Kraft Fight Hunger Bowl in San Francisco: Nevada 20, Boston College 13

==== Badminton ====
- BWF Super Series:
  - BWF Super Series Masters finals in Taipei:
    - Men's singles: **Lee Chong Wei** (MAS) def. Peter Gade (DEN) 21–9, 21–14
    - Women's singles: **Wang Shixian** (CHN) def. Bae Yeon-ju (KOR) 21–13, 21–15
    - Men's doubles: **Carsten Mogensen** (DEN)/**Mathias Boe** (DEN) def. Jung Jae-sung (KOR)/Lee Yong-dae (KOR) 21–17, 21–15
    - Women's doubles: **Wang Xiaoli** (CHN)/**Yu Yang** (CHN) def. Cheng Shu (CHN)/Zhao Yunlei (CHN) 21–7, 21–17
    - Mixed doubles: **Zhang Nan** (CHN)/**Zhao Yunlei** (CHN) def. Sudket Prapakamol (THA)/Saralee Thungthongkam (THA) 21–17, 21–12

==== Biathlon ====
- World Cup 4 in Oberhof, Germany:
  - Men's 15 km Mass start: (gold) Tarjei Bø (NOR) 39:51.3 (0+1+0+1) (silver) Emil Hegle Svendsen (NOR) 39:53.7 (1+0+2+0) (bronze) Ivan Tcherezov (RUS) 39:55.4 (0+0+1+1)
    - Overall standings (after 9 of 26 races): (1) Bø 449 points (2) Svendsen 394 (3) Ole Einar Bjørndalen (NOR) 304
  - Women's 12.5 km Mass Start: (gold) Helena Ekholm (SWE) 39:22.9 (0+0+0+0) (silver) Andrea Henkel (GER) 39:24.5 (0+1+1+0) (bronze) Svetlana Sleptsova (RUS) 39:28.1 (0+0+0+0)
    - Overall standings (after 9 of 26 races): (1) Kaisa Mäkäräinen (FIN) 425 points (2) Ekholm 381 (3) Marie-Laure Brunet (FRA) 324

==== Cricket ====
- Pakistan in New Zealand:
  - 1st Test in Hamilton, day 3: New Zealand 275 & 110 (38.3 overs); Pakistan 367 (122.1 overs) & 21/0 (3.4 overs). **Pakistan win by 10 wickets; lead 2-match series 1–0.**
- India in South Africa:
  - Only T20I in Durban: India 168/6 (20 overs); South Africa 147/9 (20 overs). **India win by 21 runs.**

==== Cross-country skiing ====
- Tour de Ski:
  - Stage 8 in Val di Fiemme, Italy:
    - Men's 9 km freestyle: (gold) Lukáš Bauer (CZE) 30:28.3 (silver) Roland Clara (ITA) 31:00.7 (bronze) Curdin Perl (SUI) 31:02.1
      - Final Tour de Ski standings: (1) Dario Cologna (SUI) 4:28:02.0 (2) Petter Northug (NOR) 4:28:29.3 (3) Bauer 4:29:46.1
        - Cologna wins his second Tour de Ski in three years.
      - World Cup Distance standings (after 11 of 17 races): (1) Cologna 481 points (2) Alexander Legkov (RUS) 406 (3) Bauer 400
      - World Cup Overall standings (after 18 of 31 races): (1) Cologna 1197 points (2) Northug 706 (3) Bauer 698
    - Women's 9 km freestyle: (gold) Therese Johaug (NOR) 33:14.4 (silver) Marte Elden (NOR) 34:14.8 (bronze) Marthe Kristoffersen (NOR) 35:08.3
      - Final Tour de Ski standings: (1) Justyna Kowalczyk (POL) 2:47:31.0 (2) Johaug 2:48:52.5 (3) Marianna Longa (ITA) 2:50:11.7
        - Kowalczyk wins her second consecutive Tour de Ski.
      - World Cup Distance standings (after 11 of 17 races): (1) Kowalczyk 592 points (2) Marit Bjørgen (NOR) 410 (3) Charlotte Kalla (SWE) 371
      - World Cup Overall standings (after 18 of 31 races): (1) Kowalczyk 1271 points (2) Arianna Follis (ITA) 864 (3) Bjørgen 760

==== Darts ====
- BDO World Championship in Frimley Green, England:
  - Men's final: **Martin Adams** (ENG) 7–5 Dean Winstanley (ENG)
    - Adams wins the title for the third time, and becomes the third player to successfully defend his title, after Eric Bristow (ENG) and Raymond van Barneveld (NED).

==== Football (soccer) ====
- AFC Asian Cup in Qatar:
  - Group B:
    - Japan 1–1 Jordan
    - Saudi Arabia 1–2 Syria

==== Golf ====
- PGA Tour:
  - Hyundai Tournament of Champions in Kapalua, Hawaii:
    - Winner: Jonathan Byrd (USA) 268 (−24)^{PO}
      - In the tour's season opener, Byrd defeats Robert Garrigus (USA) on the second playoff hole to claim his fifth PGA Tour title.
- European Tour:
  - Africa Open in Port Alfred, Eastern Cape, South Africa:
    - Winner: Louis Oosthuizen (RSA) 276 (−16)^{PO}
      - Oosthuizen defeats Chris Wood (ENG) and Manuel Quirós (ESP) on the first playoff hole to win his third European Tour title.
- Other events:
  - Royal Trophy in Cha-am/Hua Hin, Thailand:
    - Team Europe 9–7 Team Asia
      - Team Europe collects its second consecutive win in this event, and fourth in the five editions to date.

==== Nordic combined ====
- World Cup in Schonach, Germany:
  - HS 106 / 4 x 5 km: Cancelled due to bad weather.

==== Ski jumping ====
- World Cup in Harrachov, Czech Republic:
  - HS 205 (Ski flying): (gold) Thomas Morgenstern (AUT) 414.5 points (silver) Simon Ammann (SUI) 404.4 (bronze) Roman Koudelka (CZE) 401.2
    - Ski Flying standings (after 2 of 7 events): (1) Morgenstern 180 points (2) Martin Koch (AUT) 129 (3) Ammann 120
    - World Cup standings (after 13 of 26 events): (1) Morgenstern 1083 points (2) Ammann 681 (3) Andreas Kofler (AUT) 621

==== Snooker ====
- Masters in London, England, Last 16:
  - Mark Selby (ENG) [1] 4–6 **Mark King** (ENG) [15]
  - Ali Carter (ENG) [3] 5–6 **Peter Ebdon** (ENG) [13]

==== Snowboarding ====
- World Cup in Bad Gastein, Austria:
  - Men's Parallel slalom: (gold) Benjamin Karl (AUT) (silver) Aaron March (ITA) (bronze) Simon Schoch (SUI)
    - Parallel slalom standings (after 5 of 10 races): (1) Karl 2910 points (2) Andreas Prommegger (AUT) 2900 (3) Roland Fischnaller (ITA) 2760
    - Overall standings: (1) Karl 2910 points (2) Prommegger 2900 (3) Fischnaller 2760
  - Women's Parallel slalom: (gold) Yekaterina Tudegesheva (RUS) (silver) Marion Kreiner (AUT) (bronze) Claudia Riegler (AUT)
    - Parallel slalom standings (after 5 of 10 races): (1) Tudegesheva 3890 points (2) Fränzi Mägert-Kohli (SUI) 3110 (3) Alena Zavarzina (RUS) 2168
    - Overall standings: (1) Tudegesheva 3890 points (2) Mägert-Kohli 3110 (3) Dominique Maltais (CAN) 3000

==== Speed skating ====
- European Championships in Collalbo, Italy:
  - Men: (gold) Ivan Skobrev (RUS) 154.167 (silver) Jan Blokhuijsen (NED) 154.273 (bronze) Koen Verweij (NED) 154.688
    - Skobrev wins the title for the first time.
  - Women: (gold) Martina Sáblíková (CZE) 165.104 (silver) Ireen Wüst (NED) 166.463 (bronze) Marrit Leenstra (NED) 168.045
    - Sáblíková wins the title for the third time.

==== Tennis ====
- ATP World Tour:
  - Brisbane International:
    - Final: **Robin Söderling** (SWE) def. Andy Roddick (USA) 6–3, 7–5
      - Soderling wins the 7th title of his career.
  - Aircel Chennai Open:
    - Final: **Stanislas Wawrinka** (SUI) def. Xavier Malisse (BEL) 7–5, 4–6, 6–1
      - Wawrinka wins the 3rd title of his career.

=== January 8, 2011 (Saturday) ===
==== Alpine skiing ====
- Men's World Cup in Adelboden, Switzerland:
  - Giant slalom: (gold) Cyprien Richard (FRA) 2:25.28 (gold) Aksel Lund Svindal (NOR) 2:25.28 (bronze) Thomas Fanara (FRA) 2:25.48
    - Giant slalom standings (after 4 of 7 races): (1) Ted Ligety (USA) 303 points (2) Svindal 265 (3) Richard 242
    - Overall standings (after 14 of 38 races): (1) Svindal 435 points (2) Michael Walchhofer (AUT) 409 (3) Ivica Kostelić (CRO) 404
- Women's World Cup in Zauchensee, Austria:
  - Downhill: (gold) Lindsey Vonn (USA) 1:46.39 (silver) Anja Pärson (SWE) 1:46.82 (bronze) Anna Fenninger (AUT) 1:47.37
    - Downhill standings (after 4 of 9 races): (1) Vonn 360 points (2) Maria Riesch (GER) 257 (3) Elisabeth Görgl (AUT) 187
    - Overall standings (after 16 of 38 races): (1) Riesch 883 points (2) Vonn 747 (3) Görgl 515

==== American football ====
- NFL playoffs – Wild Card Weekend:
  - NFC: Seattle Seahawks 41, New Orleans Saints 36
    - The Saints become the first reigning Super Bowl champions since the St. Louis Rams in the 2000–01 playoffs to lose in the Wild Card round, thus a new champion will be crowned for the sixth straight year (the New England Patriots remain the last repeat Super Bowl champions).
    - The Seahawks become the first team with a losing record to participate in, and win a playoff game.
  - AFC: New York Jets 17, Indianapolis Colts 16
- NCAA bowl games:
  - BBVA Compass Bowl in Birmingham, Alabama: Pittsburgh 27, Kentucky 10

==== Biathlon ====
- World Cup 4 in Oberhof, Germany:
  - Women's 7.5 km Sprint: (gold) Ann Kristin Flatland (NOR) 23:29.5 (1+0) (silver) Magdalena Neuner (GER) 23:35.2 (1+1) (bronze) Andrea Henkel (GER) 23:44.7 (0+1)
    - Standings (after 4 of 10 events): (1) Kaisa Mäkäräinen (FIN) 196 points (2) Darya Domracheva (BLR) 165 (3) Neuner 150
    - Overall standings (after 8 of 26 events): (1) Mäkäräinen 394 points (2) Helena Ekholm (SWE) 321 (3) Anna Carin Zidek (SWE) 291

==== Cricket ====
- Pakistan in New Zealand:
  - 1st Test in Hamilton, day 2: New Zealand 275 (97.5 overs); Pakistan 235/4 (80 overs). Pakistan trail by 40 runs with 6 wickets remaining in the 1st innings.

==== Cross-country skiing ====
- Tour de Ski:
  - Stage 7 in Val di Fiemme, Italy:
    - Men's 20 km classical: (gold) Petter Northug (NOR) 57:17.2 (silver) Dario Cologna (SUI) 57:19.0 (bronze) Devon Kershaw (CAN) 57:19.4
      - Tour de Ski standings (after 7 of 8 races): (1) Cologna 3:56:03.9 (2) Northug 3:57:22.0 (3) Martin Jakš (CZE) 3:58:50.4
      - World Cup Distance standings (after 10 of 17 races): (1) Cologna 468 points (2) Alexander Legkov (RUS) 406 (3) Lukáš Bauer (CZE) 350
      - World Cup Overall standings (after 16 of 31 races): (1) Cologna 784 points (2) Legkov 651 (3) Marcus Hellner (SWE) 513
    - Women's 10 km classical: (gold) Justyna Kowalczyk (POL) 30:27.6 (silver) Therese Johaug (NOR) 30:33.9 (bronze) Marianna Longa (ITA) 31:23.3
      - Tour de Ski standings (after 7 of 8 races): (1) Kowalczyk 2:12:17.3 (2) Longa 2:14:25.6 (3) Arianna Follis (ITA) 2:14:50.3
      - World Cup Distance standings (after 10 of 17 races): (1) Kowalczyk 552 points (2) Marit Bjørgen (NOR) 410 (3) Charlotte Kalla (SWE) 349
      - World Cup Overall standings (after 16 of 31 races): (1) Kowalczyk 831 points (2) Bjørgen 760 (3) Follis 640

==== Football (soccer) ====
- AFC Asian Cup in Qatar:
  - Group A: Kuwait 0–2 China

==== Ice hockey ====
- World Women's U18 Championship in Stockholm, Sweden:
  - Relegation round (best-of-3 series):
    - Game 3: Switzerland 5–1 Japan. Switzerland win the series 2–1 and send Japan to Division I in 2012.
  - Bronze medal game: Czech Republic 0–3 (bronze) **Finland**
  - Final: (gold) **United States** 5–2 (silver) Canada
    - The United States win the championship for the third time.
- MLP Nations Cup in Kreuzlingen, Switzerland:
  - 5th place game: Finland 2–3 (SO) **Switzerland**
  - Bronze medal game: Germany 2–7 (bronze) **Russia**
  - Final: (silver) Sweden 0–6 (gold) **Canada**
    - Canada win the Cup for the 8th time in 9 years.

==== Nordic combined ====
- World Cup in Schonach, Germany:
  - HS 106 / 10 km: (gold) Felix Gottwald (AUT) 24:38.4 (silver) Mario Stecher (AUT) 24:54.0 (bronze) Bernhard Gruber (AUT) 24:54.6
    - Overall standings (after 7 of 13 races): (1) Stecher 466 points (2) Jason Lamy-Chappuis (FRA) 459 (3) Mikko Kokslien (NOR) 387

==== Ski jumping ====
- World Cup in Harrachov, Czech Republic:
  - HS 205 (Ski flying): (gold) Martin Koch (AUT) 425.2 points (silver) Thomas Morgenstern (AUT) 421.9 (bronze) Adam Małysz (POL) 416.6
    - World Cup standings (after 12 of 26 events): (1) Morgenstern 983 points (2) Andreas Kofler (AUT) 621 (3) Simon Ammann (SUI) 601

==== Tennis ====
- ATP World Tour:
  - Qatar ExxonMobil Open:
    - Final: **Roger Federer** (SUI) def. Nikolay Davydenko (RUS) 6–3, 6–4
      - Federer wins the tournament for the third time and the 67th title of his career.
- WTA Tour:
  - Brisbane International:
    - Final: **Petra Kvitová** (CZE) def. Andrea Petkovic (GER) 6–1, 6–3
      - Kvitová wins the second title of her career.
  - ASB Classic:
    - Final: **Gréta Arn** (HUN) def. Yanina Wickmayer (BEL) 6–3, 6–3
      - Arn wins the second title of her career.
- Hopman Cup:
  - Final: **United States** 2–1 Belgium
    - Justine Henin (BEL) def. Bethanie Mattek-Sands (USA) 7–6(6), 6–3
    - John Isner (USA) def. Ruben Bemelmans (BEL) 6–3, 6–4
    - Mattek-Sands/Isner (USA) def. Henin/Bemelmans (BEL) 6–1, 6–3
      - The United States win the Cup for a record sixth time.
- Hong Kong Tennis Classic in Hong Kong:
  - Gold Group Final: **Team Russia** 3–1 Team Europe
    - Russia win the title for the second straight time.

=== January 7, 2011 (Friday) ===
==== American football ====
- NFL news:
  - The San Francisco 49ers name Jim Harbaugh their new head coach, signing the former Stanford coach to a 5-year, US$25 million contract.
- NCAA bowl games:
  - Cotton Bowl in Arlington, Texas: LSU 41, Texas A&M 24
- Division I FCS:
  - NCAA Division I Football Championship Game in Frisco, Texas (seeds in parentheses): (5) Eastern Washington 20, (3) Delaware 19
    - The Eagles win the Championship for the first time.

==== Biathlon ====
- World Cup 4 in Oberhof, Germany:
  - Men's 10 km Sprint: (gold) Tarjei Bø (NOR) 25:49.7 (0+1) (silver) Arnd Peiffer (GER) 26:06.4 (0+1) (bronze) Michal Šlesingr (CZE) 26:10.4 (0+0)
    - Sprint standings (after 4 of 10 races): (1) Bø 214 points (2) Emil Hegle Svendsen (NOR) 161 (3) Ole Einar Bjørndalen (NOR) & Lukas Hofer (ITA) 134
    - Overall standings (after 8 of 26 races): (1) Bø 389 points (2) Svendsen 340 (3) Bjørndalen 284

==== Cricket ====
- England in Australia:
  - Ashes series:
    - Fifth Test in Sydney, day 5: Australia 280 & 281 (84.4 overs); England 644. **England win by an innings & 83 runs; win 5-match series 3–1.**
- Pakistan in New Zealand:
  - 1st Test in Hamilton, day 1: New Zealand 260/7 (90 overs); Pakistan.

==== Darts ====
- BDO World Championship in Frimley Green, England:
  - Women's final: **Trina Gulliver** (ENG) 2–0 Rhian Edwards (WAL)
    - Gulliver repeats her 2010 final victory over Edwards, and wins her ninth world title.

==== Football (soccer) ====
- AFC Asian Cup in Qatar:
  - Group A: Qatar 0–2 Uzbekistan

==== Freestyle skiing ====
- World Cup in St. Johann in Tirol, Austria:
  - Men's Ski Cross: (gold) John Teller (USA) (silver) Nick Zoricic (CAN) (bronze) Thomas Zangerl (AUT)
    - Ski Cross standings (after 3 of 11 races): (1) Teller 170 points (2) Zoricic 162 (3) Andreas Matt (AUT) 159
    - Overall standings: (1) Guilbaut Colas (FRA) 48 points (2) Patrick Deneen (USA) 40 (3) Mikaël Kingsbury (CAN) 39
  - Women's Ski Cross: (gold) Heidi Zacher (GER) (silver) Hedda Berntsen (NOR) (bronze) Anna Wörner (GER)
    - Ski Cross standings (after 3 of 11 races): (1) Zacher 210 points (2) Fanny Smith (SUI) 167 (3) Anna Holmlund (SWE) 150
    - Overall standings: (1) Hannah Kearney (USA) 56 points (2) Zacher 42 (3) Jennifer Heil (CAN) 40

==== Ice hockey ====
- World Women's U18 Championship in Stockholm, Sweden:
  - Relegation round (best-of-3 series):
    - Game 2: Japan 5–1 Switzerland. Series tied 1–1.
  - 5th place game: Germany 0–2 **Sweden**
  - Semifinals:
    - **Canada** 6–1 Finland
    - **United States** 14–1 Czech Republic
- MLP Nations Cup in Kreuzlingen, Switzerland:
  - Semifinals:
    - **Canada** 9–0 Russia
    - **Sweden** 3–1 Germany

=== January 6, 2011 (Thursday) ===
==== Alpine skiing ====
- Men's World Cup in Zagreb, Croatia:
  - Slalom: (gold) André Myhrer (SWE) 1:52.74 (silver) Ivica Kostelić (CRO) 1:52.84 (bronze) Mattias Hargin (SWE) 1:53.10
    - Slalom standings (after 3 of 10 races): (1) Myhrer 189 points (2) Kostelić 153 (3) Jean-Baptiste Grange (FRA) 122
    - Overall standings (after 13 of 38 races): (1) Michael Walchhofer (AUT) 409 points (2) Silvan Zurbriggen (SUI) 396 (3) Ted Ligety (USA) 376

==== American football ====
- NCAA bowl games:
  - GoDaddy.com Bowl in Mobile, Alabama: Miami (OH) 35, Middle Tennessee 21
    - The RedHawks, 1–11 last season, become the first team in FBS history to follow a 10-loss season with a 10-win season.

==== Biathlon ====
- World Cup 4 in Oberhof, Germany:
  - Women's 4 x 6 km Relay: (gold) Sweden (Jenny Jonsson/Anna Carin Olofsson-Zidek/Anna Maria Nilsson/Helena Ekholm) 1:17:53.1 (1+8) (silver) France (Anais Bescond/Marie Dorin/Pauline Macabies/Marie-Laure Brunet) 1:18:45.4 (3+9) (bronze) Belarus (Nadezhda Skardino/Darya Domracheva/Nadzeya Pisareva/Liudmila Kalinchik) 1:19:24.5 (1+13)
    - Standings (after 2 of 4 events): (1) Germany & Sweden 98 points (3) Ukraine 97

==== Cricket ====
- England in Australia:
  - Ashes series:
    - Fifth Test in Sydney, day 4: Australia 280 & 213/7 (67 overs); England 644 (178 overs; Matt Prior 118). Australia trail by 151 runs with 3 wickets remaining.
- India in South Africa:
  - 3rd Test in Cape Town, day 5: South Africa 362 & 341; India 364 & 166/3 (82 overs). **Match drawn; 3-match series drawn 1–1.**

==== Cross-country skiing ====
- Tour de Ski:
  - Stage 6: Cortina d'Ampezzo–Toblach, Italy:
    - Men's 35 km freestyle pursuit: (gold) Dario Cologna (SUI) 1:20:06.9 (silver) Marcus Hellner (SWE) 1:21:13.2 (bronze) Petter Northug (NOR) 1:21:46.8
      - Tour de Ski standings (after 6 of 8 races): (1) Cologna 2:59:44.9 (2) Hellner 3:00:56.2 (3) Northug 3:01:34.8
      - World Cup Distance standings (after 9 of 17 races): (1) Cologna 422 points (2) Alexander Legkov (RUS) 406 (3) Lukáš Bauer (CZE) 330
      - World Cup Overall standings (after 15 of 31 races): (1) Cologna 738 points (2) Legkov 651 (3) Hellner 505
    - Women's 16 km freestyle pursuit: (gold) Justyna Kowalczyk (POL) 37:41.7 (silver) Arianna Follis (ITA) 38:03.9 (bronze) Marianna Longa (ITA) 38:04.3
      - Tour de Ski standings (after 6 of 8 races): (1) Kowalczyk 1:42:34.7 (2) Follis 1:43:01.9 (3) Longa 1:43:07.3
      - World Cup Distance standings (after 9 of 17 races): (1) Kowalczyk 502 points (2) Marit Bjørgen (NOR) 410 (3) Charlotte Kalla (SWE) 333
      - World Cup Overall standings (after 15 of 31 races): (1) Kowalczyk 781 points (2) Bjørgen 760 (3) Follis 606

==== Ice hockey ====
- MLP Nations Cup in Kreuzlingen, Switzerland: (teams in **bold** advance to the semifinals)
  - Group A: **Sweden** 6–2 **Russia**
    - Final standings: Sweden 4 points, Russia 3, Finland 2.
  - Group B: **Germany** 0–9 **Canada**
    - Final standings: Canada 6 points, Germany 2, Switzerland 1.

==== Luge ====
- World Cup in Königssee, Germany:
  - Men's singles: (gold) Armin Zöggeler (ITA) 1:41.259 (50.494 / 50.765) (silver) Albert Demtschenko (RUS) 1:41.616 (50.848 / 50.768) (bronze) Reinhold Rainer (ITA) 1:41.668 (50.718 / 50.950)
    - Standings (after 5 of 9 events): (1) Zöggeler 470 points (2) Felix Loch (GER) 345 (3) David Möller (GER) 324
    - Zöggeler wins his fourth successive race.
  - Team relay: (gold) Germany (Natalie Geisenberger/Jan-Armin Eichhorn/Tobias Arlt/Tobias Wendl) 2:45.971 (53.646 / 56.147 / 56.178) (silver) Austria (Nina Reithmayer/Daniel Pfister/Andreas Linger/Wolfgang Linger) 2:46.179 (54.100 / 56.109 / 55.970) (bronze) Italy (Sandra Gasparini/Armin Zöggeler/Christian Oberstolz/Patrick Gruber) 2:46.520 (54.604 / 55.882 / 56.034)
    - Standings (after 3 of 6 events): (1) Germany 300 points (2) Italy 225 (3) Austria 201

==== Ski jumping ====
- Four Hills Tournament:
  - Stage 4 in Bischofshofen, Austria:
    - HS 140: (gold) Tom Hilde (NOR) 278.7 points (silver) Thomas Morgenstern (AUT) 277.1 (bronze) Andreas Kofler (AUT) 275.3
      - Final tournament standings: (1) Morgenstern 958.8 points (2) Simon Ammann (SUI) 928.4 (3) Hilde 895.0
      - World Cup standings (after 11 of 26 events): (1) Morgenstern 903 points (2) Kofler 621 (3) Ammann 561
        - Morgenstern wins the tournament for the first time.

==== Snooker ====
- Championship League Group 2:
  - Final: **Mark Williams** (WAL) 3–2 Ronnie O'Sullivan (ENG)
    - Williams advances to the winners group.

=== January 5, 2011 (Wednesday) ===
==== Baseball ====
- Major League Baseball news:
  - Roberto Alomar and Bert Blyleven are elected to the Hall of Fame by the Baseball Writers' Association of America. They will be inducted on July 24, alongside Pat Gillick, who was elected in Veterans Committee balloting in December 2010.

==== Biathlon ====
- World Cup 4 in Oberhof, Germany:
  - Men's 4 x 7.5 km Relay: (gold) Germany (Christoph Stephan, Alexander Wolf, Arnd Peiffer, Michael Greis) 1:23:53.0 (2+16) (silver) Czech Republic (Zdeněk Vítek, Jaroslav Soukup, Ondřej Moravec, Michal Šlesingr) 1:26:15.8 (3+14) (bronze) Norway (Alexander Os, Lars Berger, Rune Brattsveen, Ole Einar Bjørndalen) 1:26:17.0 (6+14)
    - Standings (after 2 of 4 events): (1) Norway 108 points (2) Germany 103 (3) Czech Republic 90

==== Cricket ====
- England in Australia:
  - Ashes series:
    - Fifth Test in Sydney, day 3: Australia 280; England 488/7 (141 overs; Alastair Cook 189, Ian Bell 115). England lead by 208 runs with 3 wickets remaining in the 1st innings.
- India in South Africa:
  - 3rd Test in Cape Town, day 4: South Africa 362 & 341 (102 overs; Jacques Kallis 109*, Harbhajan Singh 7/120); India 364. South Africa lead by 339 runs.

==== Cross-country skiing ====
- Tour de Ski:
  - Stage 5 in Toblach, Italy:
    - Men's sprint freestyle: (gold) Devon Kershaw (CAN) 2:58.0 (silver) Dario Cologna (SUI) 2:58.1 (bronze) Petter Northug (NOR) 2:59.2
      - Tour de Ski standings (after 5 of 8 races): (1) Cologna 1:39:53.0 (2) Kershaw 1:40:35.8 (3) Marcus Hellner (SWE) 1:41:07.1
      - World Cup Sprint standings (after 5 of 11 races): (1) Emil Jönsson (SWE) 280 points (2) Alexei Petukhov (RUS) 173 (3) Fulvio Scola (ITA) 162
      - World Cup Overall standings (after 14 of 31 races): (1) Cologna 688 points (2) Alexander Legkov (RUS) 651 (3) Hellner 459
    - Women's sprint freestyle: (gold) Petra Majdič (SLO) 3:17.5 (silver) Arianna Follis (ITA) 3:17.6 (bronze) Magda Genuin (ITA) 3:18.0
      - Tour de Ski standings (after 5 of 8 races): (1) Justyna Kowalczyk (POL) 1:05:08.0 (2) Majdič 1:05:47.1 (3) Charlotte Kalla (SWE) 1:06:16.8
      - World Cup Sprint standings (after 5 of 11 races): (1) Follis 272 points (2) Majdič 204 (3) Kikkan Randall (USA) 191
      - World Cup Overall standings (after 14 of 31 races): (1) Marit Bjørgen (NOR) 760 points (2) Kowalczyk 731 (3) Follis 560

==== Football (soccer) ====
- News: Kristine Lilly, whose 352 appearances with the US women's national team make her the most-capped player in the sport's history, announces her retirement after an international career of over 20 years.

==== Ice hockey ====
- World Junior Championships in Buffalo, United States:
  - Bronze medal game: Sweden 2–4 (bronze) **United States**
  - Final: (gold) **Russia** 5–3 (silver) Canada
    - Russia overturn a three-goal deficit in the third period, to win the Championships for the fourth time.
- World Women's U18 Championship in Stockholm, Sweden:
  - Relegation round (best-of-3 series):
    - Game 1: Switzerland 4–0 Japan. Switzerland lead series 1–0.
  - Quarterfinals:
    - Germany 1–3 **Czech Republic**
    - Sweden 2–3 (OT) **Finland**
- MLP Nations Cup in Kreuzlingen, Switzerland: (teams in **bold** advance to the semifinals)
  - Group A: Russia 2–0 Finland
    - Standings: Russia 3 points (1 game), Finland 2 (2), Sweden 1 (1).
  - Group B: Switzerland 4–5 (OT) **Germany**
    - Standings: **Canada** 3 points (1 game), Germany 2 (1), Switzerland 1 (2).

==== Luge ====
- World Cup in Königssee, Germany:
  - Doubles: (gold) Tobias Wendl/Tobias Arlt (GER) 1:41.362 (50.678 / 50.684) (silver) Christian Oberstolz/Patrick Gruber (ITA) 1:41.448 (50.720 / 50.728) (bronze) Andreas Linger/Wolfgang Linger (AUT) 1:41.607 (50.863 / 50.744)
    - Standings (after 5 of 9 events): (1) Wendl 430 points (2) Oberstolz 400 (3) Linger 346
  - Women's singles: (gold) Natalie Geisenberger (GER) 1:41.756 (50.896 / 50.860) (silver) Tatjana Hüfner (GER) 1:41.776 (50.978 / 50.798) (bronze) Alex Gough (CAN) 1:42.215 (51.065 / 51.150)
    - Standings (after 5 of 9 events): (1) Hüfner 485 points (2) Geisenberger 390 (3) Anke Wischnewski (GER) 345

=== January 4, 2011 (Tuesday) ===
==== Alpine skiing ====
- Women's World Cup in Zagreb, Croatia:
  - Slalom: (gold) Marlies Schild (AUT) 2:01.80 (silver) Maria Riesch (GER) 2:02.55 (bronze) Manuela Mölgg (ITA) 2:02.88
    - Slalom standings (after 5 of 10 races): (1) Schild 400 points (2) Riesch 320 (3) Tanja Poutiainen (FIN) 300
    - Overall standings (after 15 of 38 races): (1) Riesch 833 points (2) Lindsey Vonn (USA) 647 (3) Elisabeth Görgl (AUT) 483

==== American football ====
- NFL news:
  - The Oakland Raiders announce that they will not renew the contract of head coach Tom Cable for next season.
- NCAA bowl games – Bowl Championship Series:
  - Sugar Bowl in New Orleans: Ohio State 31, Arkansas 26

==== Cricket ====
- England in Australia:
  - Ashes series:
    - Fifth Test in Sydney, day 2: Australia 280 (106.1 overs); England 167/3 (48 overs). England trail by 113 runs with 7 wickets remaining in the 1st innings.
- India in South Africa:
  - 3rd Test in Cape Town, day 3: South Africa 362 & 52/2 (16 overs); India 364 (117.4 overs; Sachin Tendulkar 146, Dale Steyn 5/75). South Africa lead by 50 runs with 8 wickets remaining.

==== Ice hockey ====
- World Junior Championships in the United States:
  - Relegation round in Lewiston: (teams in ~~strike~~ are relegated to Division I in 2012)
    - ~~Germany~~ 1–3 ~~Norway~~
    - Slovakia 2–5 Czech Republic
      - Final standings: Czech Republic 9 points, Slovakia 5, Norway 3, Germany 1.
  - 5th place playoff in Buffalo: Finland 2–3 (SO) **Switzerland**
- World Women's U18 Championship in Stockholm, Sweden: (teams in **bold** advance to the semifinals, team in italic advance to the quarterfinals)
  - Group A:
    - Switzerland 1–4 Finland
    - **Canada** 8–1 Germany
      - Final standings: Canada 9 points, Germany 6, Finland 3, Switzerland 0.
  - Group B:
    - Czech Republic 4–1 Japan
    - **United States** 9–0 Sweden
      - Final standings: United States 9 points, Sweden 6, Czech Republic 3, Japan 0.
- MLP Nations Cup in Kreuzlingen, Switzerland:
  - Group A: Finland 4–3 (SO) Sweden
  - Group B: Canada 5–0 Switzerland

==== Snooker ====
- Championship League Group 1:
  - Final: **Mark Selby** (ENG) 3–2 Ali Carter (ENG)
    - Selby advances to the winners group.

=== January 3, 2011 (Monday) ===
==== American football ====
- NFL news:
  - The Cleveland Browns fire head coach Eric Mangini after the franchise's second successive 5–11 season.
- NCAA bowl games – Bowl Championship Series:
  - Orange Bowl in Miami Gardens, Florida: Stanford 40, Virginia Tech 12

==== Cricket ====
- England in Australia:
  - Ashes series:
    - Fifth Test in Sydney, day 1: Australia 134/4 (59 overs); England.
- India in South Africa:
  - 3rd Test in Cape Town, day 2: South Africa 362 (112.5 overs; Jacques Kallis 161, Sreesanth 5/114); India 142/2 (50 overs). India trail by 220 runs with 8 wickets remaining in the 1st innings.

==== Cross-country skiing ====
- Tour de Ski:
  - Stage 4 in Oberstdorf, Germany:
    - Men's 10+10 km pursuit: (gold) Matti Heikkinen (FIN) 49:20.1 (silver) Dario Cologna (SUI) 49:21.1 (bronze) Martin Jakš (CZE) 49:25.0
      - Tour de Ski standings (after 4 of 8 races): (1) Cologna 1:37:51.0 (2) Devon Kershaw (CAN) 1:38:36.9 (3) Marcus Hellner (SWE) 1:38:57.1
      - World Cup Distance standings (after 8 of 17 races): (1) Alexander Legkov (RUS) 406 points (2) Cologna 372 (3) Lukáš Bauer (CZE) 310
      - World Cup Overall standings (after 13 of 31 races): (1) Cologna 642 points (2) Legkov 640 (3) Hellner 419
    - Women's 5+5 km pursuit: (gold) Anna Haag (SWE) 26:59.8 (silver) Charlotte Kalla (SWE) 27:00.4 (bronze) Marthe Kristoffersen (NOR) 27:07.0
      - Tour de Ski standings (after 4 of 8 races): (1) Justyna Kowalczyk (POL) 1:01:52.3 (2) Kalla 1:03:12.1 (3) Marianna Longa (ITA) 1:03:14.4
      - World Cup Distance standings (after 8 of 17 races): (1) Kowalczyk 452 points (2) Marit Bjørgen (NOR) 410 (3) Kalla 293
      - World Cup Overall standings (after 13 of 31 races): (1) Bjørgen 760 points (2) Kowalczyk 722 (3) Arianna Follis (ITA) 514

==== Darts ====
- PDC World Championship in London:
  - Final: **Adrian Lewis** (ENG) 7–5 Gary Anderson (SCO)
    - Lewis becomes the fifth player to win the PDC world title and the first player to hit a nine-dart finish in the final of a World Championship, recording the perfect leg in the third leg of the first set.

==== Ice hockey ====
- World Junior Championships in Buffalo, United States:
  - Semifinals:
    - Sweden 3–4 (SO) **Russia**
    - United States 1–4 **Canada**
      - For the first time since the format change in 2003 both bye teams are eliminated in the semifinals.
      - Canada qualifies for its 10th consecutive final.

==== Ski jumping ====
- Four Hills Tournament:
  - Stage 3 in Innsbruck, Austria:
    - HS 130: (gold) Thomas Morgenstern (AUT) 266.5 points (silver) Adam Małysz (POL) 257.5 (bronze) Tom Hilde (NOR) 255.2
      - Tournament standings (after 3 of 4 events): (1) Morgenstern 681.7 points (2) Simon Ammann (SUI) 654.4 (3) Małysz 638.8
      - World Cup standings (after 10 of 26 events): (1) Morgenstern 823 points (2) Andreas Kofler (AUT) 561 (3) Ammann 511
      - Morgenstern gets his second win of the tournament and the sixth of the season.

=== January 2, 2011 (Sunday) ===
==== Alpine skiing ====
- Men's World Cup in Munich, Germany:
  - Parallel slalom: (gold) Ivica Kostelić (CRO) (silver) Julien Lizeroux (FRA) (bronze) Bode Miller (USA)
    - Overall standings (after 12 of 38 races): (1) Michael Walchhofer (AUT) 409 points (2) Silvan Zurbriggen (SUI) 395 (3) Ted Ligety (USA) 336
- Women's World Cup in Munich, Germany:
  - Parallel slalom: (gold) Maria Pietilä Holmner (SWE) (silver) Tina Maze (SLO) (bronze) Elisabeth Görgl (AUT)
    - Overall standings (after 14 of 38 races): (1) Maria Riesch (GER) 753 points (2) Lindsey Vonn (USA) 647 (3) Görgl 483

==== American football ====
- NFL Week 17 (division champions in **bold**; wild cards in italics):
  - **Atlanta Falcons** 31, Carolina Panthers 10
    - As well as sealing the NFC South, the Falcons clinch the #1 seeding for the NFC playoffs.
  - **Pittsburgh Steelers** 41, Cleveland Browns 9
  - Detroit Lions 20, Minnesota Vikings 13
  - Oakland Raiders 31, **Kansas City Chiefs** 10
  - **New England Patriots** 38, Miami Dolphins 7
  - Tampa Bay Buccaneers 23, New Orleans Saints 13
  - New York Jets 38, Buffalo Bills 7
  - Baltimore Ravens 13, Cincinnati Bengals 7
  - Houston Texans 34, Jacksonville Jaguars 17
  - New York Giants 17, Washington Redskins 14
  - Dallas Cowboys 14, **Philadelphia Eagles** 13
  - San Francisco 49ers 38, Arizona Cardinals 7
  - Green Bay Packers 10, **Chicago Bears** 3
  - **Indianapolis Colts** 23, Tennessee Titans 20
  - San Diego Chargers 33, Denver Broncos 28
  - Sunday Night Football: **Seattle Seahawks** 16, St. Louis Rams 6
    - The Seahawks win the NFC West title, and become the first team to win its division with a losing record.

==== Cricket ====
- India in South Africa:
  - 3rd Test in Cape Town, day 1: South Africa 232/4 (74 overs); India.

==== Cross-country skiing ====
- Tour de Ski:
  - Stage 3 in Oberstdorf, Germany:
    - Men's Sprint Classic: (gold) Emil Jönsson (SWE) (silver) Devon Kershaw (CAN) (bronze) Dario Cologna (SUI)
      - Tour de Ski standings (after 3 of 8 races): (1) Cologna 49:09.9 (2) Kershaw 49:13.6 (3) Alexander Legkov (RUS) 49:33.0
      - World Cup Sprint standings (after 4 of 11 races): (1) Jönsson 280 points (2) Alexei Petukhov (RUS) 173 (3) Fulvio Scola (ITA) 153
      - World Cup Overall standings (after 12 of 31 races): (1) Legkov 610 points (2) Cologna 596 (3) Marcus Hellner (SWE) 393
    - Women's Sprint Classic: (gold) Petra Majdič (SLO) (silver) Justyna Kowalczyk (POL) (bronze) Astrid Uhrenholdt Jacobsen (NOR)
      - Tour de Ski standings (after 3 of 8 races): (1) Kowalczyk 35:13.8 (2) Majdič 35:58.2 (3) Aino-Kaisa Saarinen (FIN) 36:14.1
      - World Cup Sprint standings (after 4 of 11 races): (1) Arianna Follis (ITA) 226 points (2) Majdič & Kikkan Randall (USA) 154
      - World Cup Overall standings (after 12 of 31 races): (1) Marit Bjørgen (NOR) 760 points (2) Kowalczyk 685 (3) Follis 474

==== Ice hockey ====
- World Junior Championships in the United States:
  - Relegation round in Lewiston: (teams in ~~strike~~ are relegated to Division I in 2012)
    - Slovakia 5–0 ~~Norway~~
    - Czech Republic 3–2 ~~Germany~~
      - Standings (after 2 games): Czech Republic 6 points, Slovakia 5, Germany 1, Norway 0.
  - Quarterfinals in Buffalo:
    - **Canada** 4–1 Switzerland
    - Finland 3–4 (OT) **Russia**
- World Women's U18 Championship in Stockholm, Sweden: (teams in italic advance to the final round)
  - Group A:
    - Germany 4–2 Switzerland
    - Finland 0–6 Canada
      - Standings (after 2 games): Canada, Germany 6 points, Finland, Switzerland 0.
  - Group B:
    - Japan 1–7 United States
    - Sweden 3–2 Czech Republic
      - Standings (after 2 games): United States, Sweden 6 points, Japan, Czech Republic 0.

=== January 1, 2011 (Saturday) ===
==== American football ====
- NCAA bowl games:
  - Bowl Championship Series:
    - Rose Bowl in Pasadena, California: TCU 21, Wisconsin 19
    - Fiesta Bowl in Glendale, Arizona: Oklahoma 48, Connecticut 20
  - Other games:
    - TicketCity Bowl in Dallas: Texas Tech 45, Northwestern 38
    - Capital One Bowl in Orlando, Florida: Alabama 49, Michigan State 7
    - Gator Bowl in Jacksonville, Florida: Mississippi State 52, Michigan 14
    - Outback Bowl in Tampa, Florida: Florida 37, Penn State 24

==== Cross-country skiing ====
- Tour de Ski:
  - Stage 2 in Oberhof, Germany:
    - Men's 15 km Classic Pursuit: (gold) Dario Cologna (SUI) 47:48.1 (silver) Devon Kershaw (CAN) 47:48.6 (bronze) Alexander Legkov (RUS) 47:48.9
      - Tour de Ski standings (after 2 of 8 races): (1) Cologna 47:33.1 (2) Kershaw 47:38.6 (3) Legkov 47:43.9
      - World Cup Distance standings (after 7 of 17 races): (1) Legkov 376 points (2) Cologna 326 (3) Lukáš Bauer (CZE) 273
      - World Cup Overall standings (after 11 of 31 races): (1) Legkov 576 points (2) Cologna 553 (3) Marcus Hellner (SWE) 363
    - Women's 10 km Classic Pursuit: (gold) Justyna Kowalczyk (POL) 33:32.5 (silver) Krista Lähteenmäki (FIN) 34:00.0 (bronze) Marianna Longa (ITA) 34:03.0
      - Tour de Ski standings (after 2 of 8 races): (1) Kowalczyk 33:17.5 (2) Lähteenmäki 33:50.0 (3) Longa 33:58.0
      - World Cup Distance standings (after 7 of 17 races): (1) Kowalczyk 415 points (2) Marit Bjørgen (NOR) 410 (3) Charlotte Kalla (SWE) 247
      - World Cup Overall standings (after 11 of 31 races): (1) Bjørgen 760 points (2) Kowalczyk 639 (3) Arianna Follis (ITA) 458

==== Football (soccer) ====
- (Japan) Emperor's Cup Final in Tokyo:
  - **Kashima Antlers** 2–1 Shimizu S-Pulse
    - Kashima Antlers win the Cup for the fourth time.

==== Ice hockey ====
- World Women's U18 Championship in Stockholm, Sweden:
  - Group A:
    - Canada 9–1 Switzerland
    - Germany 1–0 Finland
  - Group B:
    - United States 11–0 Czech Republic
    - Sweden 2–1 Japan
- NHL Winter Classic in Pittsburgh: Washington Capitals 3, Pittsburgh Penguins 1

==== Mixed martial arts ====
- UFC 125 in Las Vegas, United States:
  - Lightweight bout: Clay Guida (USA) def. Takanori Gomi (JPN) by submission (guillotine choke)
  - Welterweight bout: Dong Hyun Kim (KOR) def. Nate Diaz (USA) by unanimous decision (29–28, 29–28, 29–28)
  - Light Heavyweight bout: Thiago Silva (BRA) def. Brandon Vera (USA) by unanimous decision (30–26, 30–27, 30–27)
  - Middleweight bout: Brian Stann (USA) def. Chris Leben (USA) by TKO (strikes)
  - Lightweight Championship bout: Frankie Edgar (USA) (c) and Gray Maynard (USA) fought to a split draw (48–46, 46–48, 47–47).

==== Ski jumping ====
- Four Hills Tournament:
  - Stage 2 in Garmisch-Partenkirchen, Germany:
    - HS 140: (gold) Simon Ammann (SUI) 142.1 points (silver) Pavel Karelin (RUS) 138.3 (bronze) Adam Małysz (POL) 138.0
      - Tournament standings (after 2 of 4 events): (1) Thomas Morgenstern (AUT) 415.2 points (2) Ammann 401.7 (3) Matti Hautamäki (FIN) 388.7
      - World Cup standings (after 9 of 26 events): (1) Morgenstern 723 points (2) Andreas Kofler (AUT) 525 (3) Ammann 461

==== Tennis ====
- Mubadala World Tennis Championship:
  - Final: **Rafael Nadal** (ESP) def. Roger Federer (SUI) 7–6(4), 7–6(3)
    - Nadal wins the tournament for the second successive year.
