= FIS Freestyle Ski and Snowboarding World Championships 2015 – Men's ski cross =

The men's ski cross competition of the FIS Freestyle Ski and Snowboarding World Championships 2015 was held at Kreischberg, Austria on January 24 (qualifying) and January 25 (finals). 52 athletes from 19 countries competed.

== Results ==
=== Qualification ===
The following are the results of the qualification.

Rank	Bib	Name	Country	Time	Notes
1	14	Victor Öhling Norberg	Sweden	1:01.32	Q
2	13	Jean-Frédéric Chapuis	France	1:01.33	Q
3	5	Brady Leman	Canada	1:01.34	Q
4	6	Andreas Matt	Austria	1:01.81	Q
5	3	Daniel Bohnacker	Germany	1:01.90	Q
6	22	Filip Flisar	Slovenia	1:01.91	Q
7	2	Andreas Schauer	Germany	1:02.00	Q
8	12	Armin Niederer	Switzerland	1:02.01	Q
9	26	Anton Grimus	Australia	1:02.08	Q
10	11	Johannes Rohrweck	Austria	1:02.09	Q
11	10	Christopher Delbosco	Canada	1:02.13	Q
12	9	Thomas Zangerl	Austria	1:02.18	Q
13	23	Paul Eckert	Germany	1:02.19	Q
14	16	Bastien Midol	France	1:02.25	Q
15	8	Jonas Devouassoux	France	1:02.27	Q
16	7	Arnaud Bovolenta	France	1:02.30	Q, Tie: 1.969
17	4	Alex Fiva	Switzerland	1:02.30	Q, Tie: 1.973
18	29	Louis-Pierre Hélie	Canada	1:02.38	Q
19	17	Jouni Pellinen	Finland	1:02.47	Q
20	19	Tomáš Kraus	Czech Republic	1:02.49	Q
21	20	Didrik Bastian Juell	Norway	1:02.53	Q
22	39	Viktor Andersson	Sweden	1:02.54	Q
23	1	Jonathan Midol	France	1:02.56	Q
24	34	Simon Stickl	Germany	1:02.57	Q
25	21	Sergey Ridzik	Russia	1:02.62	Q
26	15	Marc Bischofberger	Switzerland	1:02.65	Q
27	28	Michael Forslund	Sweden	1:02.77	Q
28	24	Thomas Borge Lie	Norway	1:02.85	Q
29	27	Egor Korotkov	Russia	1:02.86	Q
30	36	Marco Tomasi	Italy	1:03.01	Q
31	33	Magnus Bjørnnes	Norway	1:03.03	Q
32	38	Tyler Wallasch	United States	1:03.09	Q, Tie: 1.955
33	35	Sergey Mozhaev	Russia	1:03.09	Tie: 2.034
34	37	Diego Castellaz	Italy	1:03.10	
35	25	Peter Stähli	Switzerland	1:03.15	
36	47	Brant Crossan	United States	1:03.17	
37	43	Joe Swensson	United States	1:03.20	
38	18	Thomas Harasser	Austria	1:03.31	
39	42	Blaz Ogorelc	Slovenia	1:03.32	
40	32	Stefan Thanei	Italy	1:03.34	
41	30	Francesco Mauriello	Italy	1:03.52	
42	41	Marius Heje Mæhle	Norway	1:03.55	
43	40	Victor Sticko	Sweden	1:03.60	
44	31	Ian Deans	Canada	1:03.63	
45	44	Ed Drake	Great Britain	1:03.64	
46	49	Mateusz Habrat	Poland	1:04.20	
47	45	Semen Denshchikov	Russia	1:04.40	
48	52	Alon Mullayev	Kazakhstan	1:06.17	
49	51	Tomas Bartalský	Slovakia	1:08.11	
	48	Jiři Čech	Czech Republic	DNF	
	46	Robert Mahre	United States	DSQ	
	50	Jamie Prebble	New Zealand	DSQ	

=== Elimination round ===
==== 1/8 round ====
The top 32 qualifiers advanced to the 1/8 round. From here, they participated in four-person elimination races, with the top two from each race advancing.

Heat 1

Rank	Bib	Name	Notes
1	1	Victor Öhling Norberg (SWE)	Q
2	16	Arnaud Bovolenta (FRA)	Q
3	32	Tyler Wallasch (USA)	
	17	Alex Fiva (SUI)	

Heat 3

Rank	Bib	Name	Notes
1	12	Thomas Zangerl (AUT)	Q
2	5	Daniel Bohnacker (GER)	Q
3	28	Thomas Borge Lie (NOR)	
	21	Didrik Bastian Juell (NOR)	DNS

Heat 5

Rank	Bib	Name	Notes
1	14	Bastien Midol (FRA)	Q
2	3	Brady Leman (CAN)	Q
3	19	Jouni Pellinen (FIN)	
4	30	Marco Tomasi (ITA)	

Heat 7

Rank	Bib	Name	Notes
1	26	Marc Bischofberger (SUI)	Q
2	23	Jonathan Midol (FRA)	Q
3	10	Johannes Rohrweck (AUT)	
	7	Andreas Schauer (GER)	DNF

Heat 2

1	25	Sergey Ridzik (RUS)	Q
2	8	Armin Niederer (SUI)	Q
3	24	Simon Stickl (GER)	
4	9	Anton Grimus (AUS)	

Heat 4

Rank	Bib	Name	Notes
1	4	Andreas Matt (AUT)	Q
2	13	Paul Eckert (GER)	Q
3	20	Tomáš Kraus (CZE)	
4	29	Egor Korotkov (RUS)	

Heat 6

Rank	Bib	Name	Notes
1	6	Filip Flisar (SLO)	Q
2	27	Michael Forslund (SWE)	Q
3	22	Viktor Andersson (SWE)	
4	11	Christopher Delbosco (CAN)	

Heat 8

Rank	Bib	Name	Notes
1	2	Jean-Frédéric Chapuis (FRA)	Q
2	15	Jonas Devouassoux (FRA)	Q
3	18	Louis-Pierre Hélie (CAN)	
	31	Magnus Bjørnnes (NOR)	DNF

==== Quarterfinals round ====
Heat 1

Rank	Bib	Name	Notes
1	1	Victor Öhling Norberg (SWE)	Q
2	8	Armin Niederer (SUI)	Q
3	16	Arnaud Bovolenta (FRA)	
4	25	Sergey Ridzik (RUS)	

Heat 3

Rank	Bib	Name	Notes
1	6	Filip Flisar (SLO)	Q
2	3	Brady Leman (CAN)	Q
3	27	Michael Forslund (SWE)	
4	14	Bastien Midol (CZE)	

Heat 2

Rank	Bib	Name	Notes
1	12	Thomas Zangerl (AUT)	Q
2	13	Paul Eckert (GER)	Q
3	4	Andreas Matt (AUT)	
4	5	Daniel Bohnacker (GER)	

Heat 4

Rank	Bib	Name	Notes
1	2	Jean-Frédéric Chapuis (FRA)	Q
2	15	Jonas Devouassoux (FRA)	Q
3	23	Jonathan Midol (FRA)	
4	26	Marc Bischofberger (SUI)	

==== Semifinals round ====
Heat 1

Rank	Bib	Name	Notes
1	1	Victor Öhling Norberg (SWE)	Q
2	13	Paul Eckert (GER)	Q
	8	Armin Niederer (SUI)	DNF
	12	Thomas Zangerl (AUT)	DNF

Heat 2

Rank	Bib	Name	Notes
1	2	Jean-Frédéric Chapuis (FRA)	Q
2	6	Filip Flisar (SLO)	Q
3	3	Brady Leman (CAN)	
4	15	Jonas Devouassoux (FRA)	

==== Final round ====
Small final

Rank	Bib	Name	Notes
5	3	Brady Leman (CAN)	
	15	Jonas Devouassoux (FRA)	DNF
	8	Armin Niederer (SUI)	DNS
	12	Thomas Zangerl (AUT)	DNS

Final

Rank	Bib	Name	Notes
1st place, gold medalist(s)	6	Filip Flisar (SLO)	
2nd place, silver medalist(s)	2	Jean-Frédéric Chapuis (FRA)	
3rd place, bronze medalist(s)	1	Victor Öhling Norberg (SWE)	
4	13	Paul Eckert (GER)	
