= FIS Freestyle World Ski Championships 2013 – Men's ski cross =

The men's ski cross competition of the FIS Freestyle World Ski Championships 2013 was held at Myrkdalen-Voss, Norway on March 10 (qualifying and finals). 54 athletes from 21 countries competed.

== Results ==
=== Qualification ===
The following are the results of the qualification.

Rank	Bib	Name	Country	Time	Notes
1	3	Jouni Pellinen	Finland	56.15	Q
2	16	Jean-Frédéric Chapuis	France	56.27	Q
3	10	Tomáš Kraus	Czech Republic	56.44	Q
4	25	Bastien Midol	France	56.53	Q
5	15	Christopher Del Bosco	Canada	56.60	Q
6	8	Filip Flisar	Slovenia	56.60	Q
7	22	Jonas Devouassoux	France	56.61	Q
8	5	Anton Grimus	Australia	56.64	Q
9	14	Daniel Bohnacker	Germany	56.68	Q
10	4	Brady Leman	Canada	56.73	Q
11	13	John Teller	United States	56.82	Q
12	17	Andreas Matt	Austria	56.85	Q
13	7	Tristan Tafel	Canada	56.85	Q
14	23	Simon Stickl	Germany	57.00	Q
15	12	Andreas Schauer	Germany	57.04	Q
16	9	Alex Fiva	Switzerland	57.05	Q
17	20	Scott Kneller	Australia	57.08	Q
18	30	Christian Mithassel	Norway	57.17	Q
19	1	David Duncan	Canada	57.29	Q
20	29	Viktor Andersson	Sweden	57.31	Q
21	18	Egor Korotkov	Russia	57.38	Q
22	42	Franz Promok	Austria	57.44	Q
23	26	Thomas Zangerl	Austria	57.59	Q
24	34	Conradign Netzer	Switzerland	57.64	Q
25	19	Joe Swensson	United States	57.66	Q
26	47	Marco Tomasi	Italy	57.68	Q
27	21	Didrik Bastian Juell	Norway	57.69	Q
28	38	Ivan Anikin	Russia	57.76	Q
29	32	Peter Stähli	Switzerland	57.79	Q
30	36	Sergey Mozhaev	Russia	57.81	Q
31	35	John Eklund	Sweden	57.84	Q
32	28	Morten Ring Christensen	Norway	57.89	Q
33	27	Lars Lewen	Sweden	57.92	
34	33	Thomas Borge Lie	Norway	57.94	
35	39	Jakub Kopřiva	Czech Republic	58.00	
36	40	Christoph Wahrstoetter	Austria	58.06	
37	43	Marcin Orlowski	Poland	58.23	
38	44	Jamie Prebble	New Zealand	58.29	
39	48	Diego Castellaz	Italy	58.30	
40	46	Kenji Kono	Japan	58.43	
41	31	Louis-Pierre Hélie	Canada	58.50	
42	54	Edward Drake	Great Britain	58.52	
43	52	Stephan Miribung	Italy	58.52	
44	37	Roman Ilin	Russia	58.52	
45	45	Mateusz Habrat	Poland	58.70	
46	41	Stefan Thanei	Italy	58.78	
47	49	Borja Gregorio	Spain	59.13	
48	53	Matic Masterl	Slovenia	1:00.04	
49	50	Federico Pastore	Argentina	1:01.69	
50	51	Tomas Bartalský	Slovakia	1:01.80	
51	2	Jonathan Midol	France	1:18.55	
	6	Armin Niederer	Switzerland	DNF	
	11	Victor Öhling Norberg	Sweden	DNF	
	24	Thomas Fischer	Germany	DNS	

=== Elimination round ===
==== 1/8 round ====
The top 32 qualifiers advanced to the 1/8 round. From here, they participated in four-person elimination races, with the top two from each race advancing.

Heat 1

Rank	Bib	Name	Notes
1	16	Alex Fiva (SUI)	Q
2	1	Jouni Pellinen (FIN)	Q
3	17	Scott Kneller (AUS)	
	32	Morten Ring Christensen (NOR)	DNS

Heat 3

Rank	Bib	Name	Notes
1	12	Andreas Matt (AUT)	Q
2	5	Christopher Del Bosco (CAN)	Q
3	28	Ivan Anikin (RUS)	
4	21	Egor Korotkov (RUS)	

Heat 5

Rank	Bib	Name	Notes
1	3	Tomáš Kraus (CZE)	Q
2	30	Sergey Mozhaev (RUS)	Q
3	19	David Duncan (CAN)	
4	14	Simon Stickl (GER)	

Heat 7

Rank	Bib	Name	Notes
1	10	Brady Leman (CAN)	Q
2	26	Marco Tomasi (ITA)	Q
3	23	Thomas Zangerl (AUT)	
4	7	Jonas Devouassoux (FRA)	

Heat 2

1	9	Daniel Bohnacker (GER)	Q
2	8	Anton Grimus (AUS)	Q
3	24	Conradign Netzer (SUI)	
4	25	Joe Swensson (USA)	

Heat 4

Rank	Bib	Name	Notes
1	4	Bastien Midol (FRA)	Q
2	13	Tristan Tafel (CAN)	Q
3	29	Peter Stähli (SUI)	
4	20	Viktor Andersson (SWE)	

Heat 6

Rank	Bib	Name	Notes
1	11	John Teller (USA)	Q
2	6	Filip Flisar (SLO)	Q
3	22	Franz Promok (AUT)	
4	27	Didrik Bastian Juell (NOR)	

Heat 8

Rank	Bib	Name	Notes
1	15	Andreas Schauer (GER)	Q
2	2	Jean-Frédéric Chapuis (FRA)	Q
3	18	Christian Mithassel (NOR)	
4	31	John Eklund (SWE)	

==== Quarterfinals round ====
Heat 1

Rank	Bib	Name	Notes
1	1	Jouni Pellinen (FIN)	Q
2	8	Anton Grimus (AUS)	Q
3	16	Alex Fiva (SUI)	
4	9	Daniel Bohnacker (GER)	

Heat 3

Rank	Bib	Name	Notes
1	6	Filip Flisar (SLO)	Q
2	11	John Teller (USA)	Q
	30	Sergey Mozhaev (RUS)	DNF
	3	Tomáš Kraus (CZE)	DNF

Heat 2

Rank	Bib	Name	Notes
1	4	Bastien Midol (FRA)	Q
2	5	Christopher Del Bosco (CAN)	Q
3	13	Tristan Tafel (CAN)	
	12	Andreas Matt (AUT)	DNF

Heat 4

Rank	Bib	Name	Notes
1	2	Jean-Frédéric Chapuis (FRA)	Q
2	26	Marco Tomasi (ITA)	Q
3	15	Andreas Schauer (GER)	
4	10	Brady Leman (CAN)	

==== Semifinals round ====
Heat 1

Rank	Bib	Name	Notes
1	1	Jouni Pellinen (FIN)	Q
2	4	Bastien Midol (FRA)	Q
3	5	Christopher Del Bosco (CAN)	
4	8	Anton Grimus (AUS)	

Heat 2

Rank	Bib	Name	Notes
1	2	Jean-Frédéric Chapuis (FRA)	Q
2	11	John Teller (USA)	Q
3	26	Marco Tomasi (ITA)	
4	6	Filip Flisar (SLO)	

==== Final round ====
Small final

Rank	Bib	Name	Notes
5	6	Filip Flisar (SLO)	
6	5	Christopher Del Bosco (CAN)	
7	8	Anton Grimus (AUS)	
8	26	Marco Tomasi (ITA)	

Final

Rank	Bib	Name	Notes
1st place, gold medalist(s)	2	Jean-Frédéric Chapuis (FRA)	
2nd place, silver medalist(s)	4	Bastien Midol (FRA)	
3rd place, bronze medalist(s)	11	John Teller (USA)	
	1	Jouni Pellinen (FIN)	DNF
