= FIS Freestyle World Ski Championships 2011 – Men's ski cross =

The men's Ski cross competition of the FIS Freestyle World Ski Championships 2011 was held at Deer Valley, Utah, United States between February 3 and 4, 2011 (qualifications and finals).

46 athletes from 20 countries competed.

== Results ==
=== Qualification ===
The following are the results of the qualification.

Rank	Bib	Name	Country	Time	Note
1	6	Christopher Del Bosco	Canada	1:02.51	Q
2	7	Andreas Matt	Austria	1:03.09	Q
3	3	Jouni Pellinen	Finland	1:03.12	Q
4	16	Nick Zoričić	Canada	1:03.36	Q
5	4	Tomáš Kraus	Czech Republic	1:03.37	Q
6	1	Scott Kneller	Australia	1:03.52	Q
7	8	Daniel Bohnacker	Germany	1:03.53	Q
8	11	David Duncan	Canada	1:03.54	Q
9	10	John Teller	United States	1:03.60	Q
10	9	Armin Niederer	Switzerland	1:03.68	Q
11	12	Davey Barr	Canada	1:03.72	Q
12	14	Patrick Gasser	Switzerland	1:03.73	Q
13	19	Paul Eckert	Germany	1:03.83	Q
14	22	Filip Flisar	Slovenia	1:03.89	Q
15	13	Simon Stickl	Germany	1:03.93	Q
16	18	Arnaud Bovolenta	France	1:03.99	Q
17	5	Thomas Zangerl	Austria	1:04.02	Q
18	2	Conradign Netzer	Switzerland	1:04.17	Q
19	20	Sylvain Miaillier	France	1:04.18	Q
20	21	Jonas Devouassoux	France	1:04.20	Q
21	24	Thomas Fischer	Germany	1:04.21	Q
22	33	Zdenek Safar	Czech Republic	1:04.22	Q
23	15	Alex Fiva	Switzerland	1:04.50	Q
24	28	Michael Forslund	Sweden	1:04.51	Q
25	35	Kenji Kono	Japan	1:04.90	Q
26	17	Egor Korotkov	Russia	1:04.93	Q
27	29	Christoph Wahrstoetter	Austria	1:04.99	Q
28	30	Errol Kerr	Jamaica	1:05.01	Q
29	25	Didrik Bastian Juell	Norway	1:05.11	Q
30	26	Anton Grimus	Australia	1:05.13	Q
31	40	Artem Danilov	Russia	1:05.14	Q
32	31	Klaus Waldner	Austria	1:05.22	Q
33	31	Peter Edward Whelan	United Kingdom	1:05.33	
34	23	Thomas Borge Lie	Norway	1:05.73	
35	32	Alexandr Bondar	Russia	1:05.79	
36	39	Ivan Anikin	Russia	1:05.99	
37	34	Patrick Duran	United States	1:06.03	
38	36	Trevor Ricioli	United States	1:06.19	
39	42	Godai Fukui	Japan	1:06.44	
40	38	Ethan Fortney	United States	1:07.71	
41	38	Douglas Whitfield	New Zealand	1:08.50	
42	38	Cristhian Ravelo	Colombia	1:09.71	
43	38	William Lunn	Ireland	1:12.46	
44	38	Bruno Monti	Brazil	1:16.97	
45	38	Olle Kling	Sweden	1:33.79	
	43	Christian Blanco	Brazil		DNS

=== Elimination round ===
==== 1/8 round ====
The top 32 qualifiers advanced to the 1/8 round. From here, they participated in four-person elimination races, with the top two from each race advancing.

Heat 1

Rank	Bib	Name	Country	Notes
1	1	Christopher Del Bosco	Canada	Q
2	16	Arnaud Bovolenta	France	Q
3	17	Thomas Zangerl	Austria	
4	32	Klaus Waldner	Austria	

Heat 2

Rank	Bib	Name	Country	Notes
1	9	John Teller	United States	Q
2	24	Michael Forslund	Sweden	Q
3	25	Kenji Kono	Japan	
4	8	David Duncan	Canada	

Heat 3

Rank	Bib	Name	Country	Notes
1	5	Tomáš Kraus	Czech Republic	Q
2	12	Patrick Gasser	Switzerland	Q
3	21	Thomas Fischer	Germany	
4	28	Errol Kerr	Jamaica	

Heat 4

Rank	Bib	Name	Country	Notes
1	4	Nick Zoricic	Canada	Q
2	20	Jonas Devouassoux	France	Q
3	29	Didrik Bastian Juell	Norway	
4	13	Paul Eckert	Germany	

Heat 5

Rank	Bib	Name	Country	Notes
1	3	Jouni Pellinen	Finland	Q
2	14	Filip Flisar	Slovenia	Q
3	19	Sylvain Miaillier	France	
4	30	Anton Grimus	Australia	

Heat 6

Rank	Bib	Name	Country	Notes
1	11	Davey Barr	Canada	Q
2	22	Zdenek Safar	Czech Republic	Q
3	6	Scott Kneller	Australia	
4	27	Christoph Wahrstoetter	Austria	

Heat 7

Rank	Bib	Name	Country	Notes
1	10	Armin Niederer	Switzerland	Q
2	26	Egor Korotkov	Russia	Q
3	7	Daniel Bohnacker	Germany	
4	23	Alex Fiva	Switzerland	

Heat 8

Rank	Bib	Name	Country	Notes
1	2	Andreas Matt	Austria	Q
2	18	Conradign Netzer	Switzerland	Q
3	15	Simon Stickl	Germany	
4	31	Artem Danilov	Russia	

==== 1/4 Round ====
Heat 1

Rank	Bib	Name	Country	Notes
1	1	Christopher Del Bosco	Canada	Q
2	9	John Teller	United States	Q
3	24	Michael Forslund	Sweden	
4	16	Arnaud Bovolenta	France	

Heat 2

Rank	Bib	Name	Country	Notes
1	5	Tomáš Kraus	Czech Republic	Q
2	4	Nick Zoricic	Canada	Q
3	20	Jonas Devouassoux	France	
4	12	Patrick Gasser	Switzerland	

Heat 3

Rank	Bib	Name	Country	Notes
1	3	Jouni Pellinen	Finland	Q
2	11	Davey Barr	Canada	Q
3	14	Filip Flisar	Slovenia	
4	22	Zdenek Safar	Czech Republic	

Heat 4

Rank	Bib	Name	Country	Notes
1	2	Andreas Matt	Austria	Q
2	18	Conradign Netzer	Switzerland	Q
3	10	Armin Niederer	Switzerland	
4	26	Egor Korotkov	Russia	

==== 1/2 Round ====
Heat 1

Rank	Bib	Name	Country	Notes
1	5	Tomáš Kraus	Czech Republic	Q
2	1	Christopher Del Bosco	Canada	Q
3	9	John Teller	United States	
4	4	Nick Zoricic	Canada	

Heat 2

Rank	Bib	Name	Country	Notes
1	2	Andreas Matt	Austria	Q
2	3	Jouni Pellinen	Finland	Q
3	11	Davey Barr	Canada	
4	18	Conradign Netzer	Switzerland	

==== Final round ====
Small Final

Rank	Bib	Name	Country	Notes
5	9	John Teller	United States	
6	18	Conradign Netzer	Switzerland	
7	11	Davey Barr	Canada	
8	4	Nick Zoricic	Canada	

Final

Rank	Bib	Name	Country	Notes
1st place, gold medalist(s)	1	Christopher Del Bosco	Canada	
2nd place, silver medalist(s)	3	Jouni Pellinen	Finland	
3rd place, bronze medalist(s)	2	Andreas Matt	Austria	
4	5	Tomáš Kraus	Czech Republic	
