= Freestyle skiing at the 2014 Winter Olympics – Men's ski cross =

Men's ski cross at the XXII Olympic Winter Games
- Venue: Rosa Khutor Extreme Park, Krasnaya Polyana, Russia
- Dates: 20 February 2014
- Competitors: 31 from 13 nations

Medalists
1st place, gold medalist(s)		Jean-Frédéric Chapuis	France
2nd place, silver medalist(s)		Arnaud Bovolenta	France
3rd place, bronze medalist(s)		Jonathan Midol	France

The men's ski cross event in freestyle skiing at the 2014 Winter Olympics in Sochi, Russia took place on February 20, 2014.

== Results ==
The event was started at 11:45.

=== Seeding ===
Rank	Bib	Name	Country	Time	Difference	Notes
1	4	Victor Öhling Norberg	Sweden	1:15.59	0.00	Q
2	2	Christopher Del Bosco	Canada	1:15.91	+0.32	Q
3	8	Brady Leman	Canada	1:16.43	+0.84	Q
4	15	Jean-Frédéric Chapuis	France	1:16.77	+1.18	Q
5	18	Anton Grimus	Australia	1:16.82	+1.23	Q
6	9	David Duncan	Canada	1:17.31	+1.72	Q
7	13	Filip Flisar	Slovenia	1:17.35	+1.76	Q
8	16	Armin Niederer	Switzerland	1:17.39	+1.80	Q
9=	3	Tomáš Kraus	Czech Republic	1:17.41	+1.82	Q
9=	12	Jouni Pellinen	Finland	1:17.41	+1.82	Q
11	17	Arnaud Bovolenta	France	1:17.48	+1.89	Q
12	5	Andreas Matt	Austria	1:17.55	+1.96	Q
13	7	Daniel Bohnacker	Germany	1:17.59	+2.00	Q
14=	22	Christoph Wahrstötter	Austria	1:17.72	+2.13	Q
14=	14	Thomas Zangerl	Austria	1:17.72	+2.13	Q
16	32	Sergey Mozhaev	Russia	1:17.83	+2.24	Q
17	24	Egor Korotkov	Russia	1:17.87	+2.28	Q
18	25	Didrik Bastian Juell	Norway	1:18.03	+2.44	Q
19	19	Thomas Fischer	Germany	1:18.06	+2.47	Q
20	6	John Teller	United States	1:18.14	+2.55	Q
21	10	Jonas Devouassoux	France	1:18.32	+2.73	Q
22	28	Michael Forslund	Sweden	1:18.33	+2.74	Q
23	20	Christian Mithassel	Norway	1:18.40	+2.81	Q
24	31	Scott Kneller	Australia	1:18.58	+2.99	Q
25	23	Thomas Borge Lie	Norway	1:18.69	+3.10	Q
26	29	Florian Eigler	Germany	1:18.91	+3.32	Q
27	27	John Eklund	Sweden	1:18.97	+3.38	Q
28	26	Patrick Koller	Austria	1:19.12	+3.53	Q
29	11	Jonathan Midol	France	1:19.57	+3.98	Q
30	1	Alex Fiva	Switzerland	DNF	–	Q
31	21	Andreas Schauer	Germany	DNF	–	Q
32	30	Michael Schmid	Switzerland	DNS	–	Q

Q – Qualified for 1/8 finals; DNF – Did not finish; DNS – Did not start

=== Elimination round ===
==== 1/8 finals ====
The 32 seeds advanced to the 1/8 finals. From here, they participated in four-person elimination races, with the top two from each race advancing.

Heat 1

Rank	Bib	Name	Country	Notes
1	1	Victor Öhling Norberg	Sweden	Q
2	17	Egor Korotkov	Russia	Q
3	16	Sergey Mozhaev	Russia	
4	32	Michael Schmid	Switzerland	DNS

Heat 2

Rank	Bib	Name	Country	Notes
1	9	Jouni Pellinen	Finland	Q
2	8	Armin Niederer	Switzerland	Q
3	24	Scott Kneller	Australia	
4	25	Thomas Borge Lie	Norway	DNF

Heat 3

Rank	Bib	Name	Country	Notes
1	12	Andreas Matt	Austria	Q
2	21	Jonas Devouassoux	France	Q
3	28	Patrick Koller	Austria	
4	5	Anton Grimus	Australia	

Heat 4

Rank	Bib	Name	Country	Notes
1	4	Jean-Frédéric Chapuis	France	Q
2	29	Jonathan Midol	France	Q
3	13	Daniel Bohnacker	Germany	
4	20	John Teller	United States	DNF

Heat 5

Rank	Bib	Name	Country	Notes
1	3	Brady Leman	Canada	Q
2	19	Thomas Fischer	Germany	Q
3	14	Christoph Wahrstötter	Austria	
4	30	Alex Fiva	Switzerland	

Heat 6

Rank	Bib	Name	Country	Notes
1	27	John Eklund	Sweden	Q
2	11	Arnaud Bovolenta	France	Q
3	22	Michael Forslund	Sweden	
4	6	David Duncan	Canada	

Heat 7

Rank	Bib	Name	Country	Notes
1	7	Filip Flisar	Slovenia	Q
2	26	Florian Eigler	Germany	Q
3	10	Tomáš Kraus	Czech Republic	
4	23	Christian Mithassel	Norway	DNF

Heat 8

Rank	Bib	Name	Country	Notes
1	18	Didrik Bastian Juell	Norway	Q
2	31	Andreas Schauer	Germany	Q
3	2	Christopher Del Bosco	Canada	
4	15	Thomas Zangerl	Austria	

==== Quarterfinals ====
The top 2 from each heat of the 1/8 round advanced to the 1/4 round. From here, they participated in four-person elimination races, with the top two from each race advancing.

Heat 1

Rank	Bib	Name	Country	Notes
1	8	Armin Niederer	Switzerland	Q
2	17	Egor Korotkov	Russia	Q
3	1	Victor Öhling Norberg	Sweden	
4	9	Jouni Pellinen	Finland	

Heat 2

Rank	Bib	Name	Country	Notes
1	4	Jean-Frédéric Chapuis	France	Q
2	29	Jonathan Midol	France	Q
3	21	Jonas Devouassoux	France	
4	12	Andreas Matt	Austria	

Heat 3

Rank	Bib	Name	Country	Notes
1	3	Brady Leman	Canada	Q
2	11	Arnaud Bovolenta	France	Q
3	27	John Eklund	Sweden	
4	19	Thomas Fischer	Germany	DNF

Heat 4

Rank	Bib	Name	Country	Notes
1	7	Filip Flisar	Slovenia	Q
2	26	Florian Eigler	Germany	Q
3	31	Andreas Schauer	Germany	
4	18	Didrik Bastian Juell	Norway	

==== Semifinals ====
The top 2 from each heat of the 1/4 round advanced to the semifinals. From here, they participated in four-person elimination races, with the top two from each race advancing to the final and the third and fourth entering a classification race.

Heat 1

Rank	Bib	Name	Country	Notes
1	4	Jean-Frédéric Chapuis	France	Q
2	29	Jonathan Midol	France	Q
3	17	Egor Korotkov	Russia	
4	8	Armin Niederer	Switzerland	

Heat 2

Rank	Bib	Name	Country	Notes
1	3	Brady Leman	Canada	Q
2	11	Arnaud Bovolenta	France	Q
3	26	Florian Eigler	Germany	
4	7	Filip Flisar	Slovenia	

==== Finals ====
Small Final

Rank	Bib	Name	Country	Notes
5	17	Egor Korotkov	Russia	
6	7	Filip Flisar	Slovenia	
7	8	Armin Niederer	Switzerland	
8	26	Florian Eigler	Germany	DNF

Big Final

Rank	Bib	Name	Country	Notes
1st place, gold medalist(s)	4	Jean-Frédéric Chapuis	France	
2nd place, silver medalist(s)	11	Arnaud Bovolenta	France	
3rd place, bronze medalist(s)	29	Jonathan Midol	France	
4	3	Brady Leman	Canada	

== Controversy ==
Both Canada and Slovenia appealed separately to the Court of Arbitration for Sport that the three French athletes in the Big Final had their pants illegally changed by their coach. They argued it gave the three an aerodynamic advantage over the rest of the field. Both countries first appealed to the International Ski Federation, but were rejected since they appealed hours after the end of the competition (when the deadline was 15 minutes after the close of the race). The appeal to the court was ultimately unsuccessful as well, because the Court agreed with the ski federation that the appeal was filed past the deadline.
