= France at the 2014 Winter Olympics =

- IOC code: FRA
- NOC: French National Olympic and Sports Committee
- Website: www.franceolympique.com (in French)

in Sochi
- Competitors: 116 in 12 sports
- Flag bearer: Jason Lamy-Chappuis (opening) Martin Fourcade (closing)
- Medals Ranked 10th: Gold 4 Silver 4 Bronze 7 Total 15

Winter Olympics appearances (overview)
- 1924; 1928; 1932; 1936; 1948; 1952; 1956; 1960; 1964; 1968; 1972; 1976; 1980; 1984; 1988; 1992; 1994; 1998; 2002; 2006; 2010; 2014; 2018; 2022; 2026

France competed at the 2014 Winter Olympics in Sochi, Russia, from 7 to 23 February 2014.

French President François Hollande did not attend the opening ceremony. He has not said publicly that the decision was a political gesture.

The French delegation won a total of 15 medals (including 4 gold), its most ever at a Winter Olympic Games and ranked eighth in overall medals.

== Medalists ==
Medal	Name	Sport	Event	Date
Gold	Martin Fourcade	Biathlon	Men's pursuit	10 February
Gold	Martin Fourcade	Biathlon	Men's individual	13 February
Gold	Pierre Vaultier	Snowboarding	Men's snowboard cross	18 February
Gold	Jean-Frédéric Chapuis	Freestyle skiing	Men's ski cross	20 February
Silver	Martin Fourcade	Biathlon	Men's mass start	18 February
Silver	Steve Missillier	Alpine skiing	Men's giant slalom	19 February
Silver	Arnaud Bovolenta	Freestyle skiing	Men's ski cross	20 February
Silver	Marie Martinod	Freestyle skiing	Women's halfpipe	20 February
Bronze	Jean-Guillaume Béatrix	Biathlon	Men's pursuit	10 February
Bronze	Coline Mattel	Ski jumping	Women's normal hill individual	11 February
Bronze	Chloé Trespeuch	Snowboarding	Women's snowboard cross	16 February
Bronze	Robin Duvillard; Jean-Marc Gaillard; Maurice Manificat; Ivan Perrillat Boiteux	Cross-country skiing	Men's 4×10 km relay	16 February
Bronze	Kevin Rolland	Freestyle skiing	Men's halfpipe	18 February
Bronze	Alexis Pinturault	Alpine skiing	Men's giant slalom	19 February
Bronze	Jonathan Midol	Freestyle skiing	Men's ski cross	20 February

Medals by sport
Sport	1st place, gold medalist(s)	2nd place, silver medalist(s)	3rd place, bronze medalist(s)	Total
Alpine skiing	0	1	1	2
Biathlon	2	1	1	4
Cross-country skiing	0	0	1	1
Freestyle skiing	1	2	2	5
Ski jumping	0	0	1	1
Snowboarding	1	0	1	2
Total	4	4	7	15

Medals by date
Day	Date	1st place, gold medalist(s)	2nd place, silver medalist(s)	3rd place, bronze medalist(s)	Total
Day 1	8 February	0	0	0	0
Day 2	9 February	0	0	0	0
Day 3	10 February	1	0	1	2
Day 4	11 February	0	0	1	1
Day 5	12 February	0	0	0	0
Day 6	13 February	1	0	0	1
Day 7	14 February	0	0	0	0
Day 8	15 February	0	0	0	0
Day 9	16 February	0	0	2	2
Day 10	17 February	0	0	0	0
Day 11	18 February	1	1	1	3
Day 12	19 February	0	1	1	2
Day 13	20 February	1	2	1	4
Day 14	21 February	0	0	0	0
Day 15	22 February	0	0	0	0
Day 16	23 February	0	0	0	0
Total		4	4	7	15

Multiple medalists
Name	Sport	1st place, gold medalist(s)	2nd place, silver medalist(s)	3rd place, bronze medalist(s)	Total
Martin Fourcade	Biathlon	2	1	0	3

== Alpine skiing ==
On 22 January 2014, 14 provisional slots have been filled by the French alpine skiing team. The remainder of the team, including pending selections, was officially announced on 27 January 2014. Cyprien Richard and Brice Roger (tore his anterior cruciate ligament during training) were selected to the team, however did not compete in any race.

Men

Athlete	Event	Run 1		Run 2		Total	
Athlete	Event	Time	Rank	Time	Rank	Time	Rank
Johan Clarey	Downhill	—N/a				DNF	
Johan Clarey	Super-G	—N/a				1:19.75	=19
Mathieu Faivre	Giant slalom	1:23.53	22	1:25.90	28	2:49.43	24
Thomas Fanara	Giant slalom	1:22.41	=4	1:24.32	16	2:46.73	9
Guillermo Fayed	Downhill	—N/a				2:09.03	26
Jean-Baptiste Grange	Slalom	47.47	5	DNF			
Julien Lizeroux	Slalom	48.69	17	55.63	14	1:44.32	15
Thomas Mermillod-Blondin	Super-G	—N/a				1:19.53	15
Thomas Mermillod-Blondin	Combined	1:56.23	27	DNF			
Steve Missillier	Giant slalom	1:22.58	10	1:23.19	1	2:45.77	2nd place, silver medalist(s)
Steve Missillier	Slalom	DNF					
Alexis Pinturault	Combined	1:55.68	23	DNF			
Alexis Pinturault	Giant slalom	1:22.44	6	1:23.49	2	2:45.93	3rd place, bronze medalist(s)
Alexis Pinturault	Slalom	47.78	8	DNF			
David Poisson	Downhill	—N/a				2:07.83	16
David Poisson	Super-G	—N/a				1:19.74	=17
Adrien Théaux	Downhill	—N/a				2:07.89	18
Adrien Théaux	Super-G	—N/a				1:19.35	11
Adrien Théaux	Combined	1:55.00	17	53.66	17	2:48.66	17

Women

Athlete	Event	Run 1		Run 2		Total	
Athlete	Event	Time	Rank	Time	Rank	Time	Rank
Anne-Sophie Barthet	Giant slalom	1:20.71	17	1:19.17	12	2:39.88	=14
Anne-Sophie Barthet	Slalom	56.99	23	53.12	17	1:50.11	18
Adeline Baud	Giant slalom	1:21.49	22	1:19.42	=15	2:40.91	22
Adeline Baud	Slalom	56.50	19	DNF			
Marion Bertrand	Giant slalom	DNF					
Marie Marchand-Arvier	Downhill	—N/a				DNF	
Marie Marchand-Arvier	Super-G	—N/a				DNF	
Anémone Marmottan	Giant slalom	1:19.69	9	1:18.79	9	2:38.48	8
Anémone Marmottan	Slalom	57.08	24	51.88	5	1:48.96	13
Nastasia Noens	Slalom	53.81	5	52.31	8	1:46.12	7

== Biathlon ==
Based on their performance at the 2012 and 2013 Biathlon World Championships France qualified 6 men and 6 women.

Men

Athlete	Event	Time	Misses	Rank
Jean-Guillaume Béatrix	Sprint	25:12.1	1 (1+0)	14
Jean-Guillaume Béatrix	Pursuit	34:12.8	1 (0+0+1+0)	3rd place, bronze medalist(s)
Jean-Guillaume Béatrix	Individual	50:15.5	1 (0+0+0+1)	6
Jean-Guillaume Béatrix	Mass start	44:34.2	3 (0+0+2+1)	17
Alexis Bœuf	Individual	58:39.0	4 (1+1+1+1)	82
Simon Desthieux	Sprint	26:18.2	2 (0+2)	46
Simon Desthieux	Pursuit	35:35.6	1 (0+0+1+0)	21
Martin Fourcade	Sprint	24:45.9	1 (0+1)	6
Martin Fourcade	Pursuit	33:48.6	1 (0+0+1+0)	1st place, gold medalist(s)
Martin Fourcade	Individual	49:31.7	1 (0+1+0+0)	1st place, gold medalist(s)
Martin Fourcade	Mass start	42:29.1	1 (1+0+0+0)	2nd place, silver medalist(s)
Simon Fourcade	Sprint	26:04.2	2 (1+1)	36
Simon Fourcade	Pursuit	35:15.0	1 (0+0+1+0)	18
Simon Fourcade	Individual	51:29.9	2 (0+2+0+0)	13
Simon Fourcade	Mass start	DNF	2	DNF
Jean-Guillaume Béatrix; Simon Desthieux; Martin Fourcade; Simon Fourcade	Team relay	1:13:46.4	7 (0+7)	8

Women

Athlete	Event	Time	Misses	Rank
Anaïs Bescond	Sprint	21:36.7	1 (1+0)	5
Anaïs Bescond	Pursuit	30:43.7	2 (0+0+1+1)	12
Anaïs Bescond	Individual	45:34.0	2 (0+2+0+0)	5
Anaïs Bescond	Mass start	36:55.3	3 (0+0+3+0)	10
Marine Bolliet	Individual	48:12.1	2 (0+2+0+0)	26
Marie-Laure Brunet	Sprint	23:27.4	0 (0+0)	56
Marie-Laure Brunet	Pursuit	DNS		
Marie-Laure Brunet	Individual	47:13.6	0 (0+0+0+0)	17
Anaïs Chevalier	Sprint	23:03.4	1 (0+1)	47
Anaïs Chevalier	Pursuit	34:14.5	1 (1+0+0+0)	44
Marie Dorin Habert	Sprint	21:55.0	0 (0+0)	20
Marie Dorin Habert	Pursuit	30:53.6	1 (0+0+1+0)	14
Marie Dorin Habert	Individual	49:06.5	4 (2+1+0+1)	39
Anaïs Bescond; Marie-Laure Brunet; Anaïs Chevalier; Marie Dorin Habert	Team relay	DNF		

Mixed

Athlete	Event	Time	Misses	Rank
Jean-Guillaume Béatrix; Anaïs Bescond; Marie Dorin Habert; Martin Fourcade	Team relay	1:12:04.3	9 (1+8)	6

== Bobsleigh ==
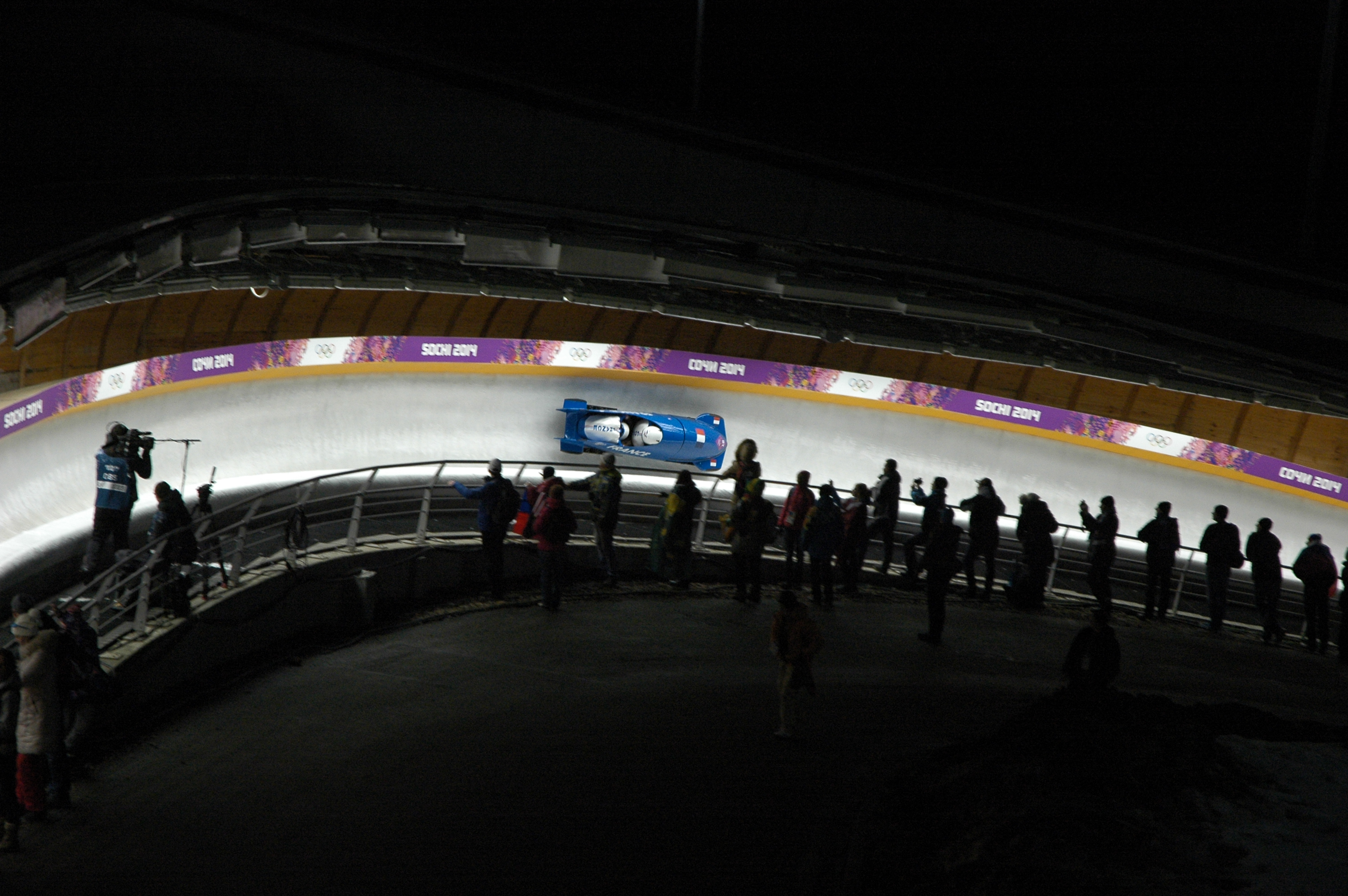
French two-man bobsleigh

Athlete	Event	Run 1		Run 2		Run 3		Run 4		Total	
Athlete	Event	Time	Rank	Time	Rank	Time	Rank	Time	Rank	Time	Rank
Loïc Costerg*; Romain Heinrich	Two-man	57.44	19	57.04	14	57.65	22	57.23	20	3:49.36	20
Jérémy Baillard; Jérémie Boutherin; Thibault Godefroy*; Vincent Ricard	Four-man	56.37	25	56.27	24	56.35	24	did not advance		2:48.99	23
Loïc Costerg*; Romain Heinrich; Elly Lefort; Florent Ribet	Four-man	55.82	18	55.68	17	55.91	15	55.77	14	3:43.18	17

* – Denotes the driver of each sled

== Cross-country skiing ==
France has qualified for the following events according to the quota allocation by the International Ski Federation (FIS). Aurélie Dabudyk was selected to the team but did not compete in any race.

Distance
Men

Athlete	Event	Classical		Freestyle		Final		
Athlete	Event	Time	Rank	Time	Rank	Time	Deficit	Rank
Adrien Backscheider	15 km classical	—N/a				42:21.7	+3:52.0	43
Robin Duvillard	50 km freestyle	—N/a				1:47:10.1	+14.9	6
Jean-Marc Gaillard	15 km classical	—N/a				40:22.8	+1:53.1	21
Jean-Marc Gaillard	30 km skiathlon	36:03.1	=9	31:55.7	7	1:08:29.8	+14.4	6
Jean-Marc Gaillard	50 km freestyle	—N/a				1:49:49.7	+2:54.5	35
Maurice Manificat	30 km skiathlon	36:07.6	16	31:54.0	6	1:08:33.6	+18.2	9
Maurice Manificat	50 km freestyle	—N/a				1:52:01.6	+5:06.4	43
Cyril Miranda	15 km classical	—N/a				43:22.5	+4:52.8	56
Ivan Perrillat Boiteux	30 km skiathlon	37:09.4	36	34:24.6	44	1:12:04.5	+3:49.1	41
Ivan Perrillat Boiteux	50 km freestyle	—N/a				1:47:31.7	+36.5	13
Robin Duvillard; Jean-Marc Gaillard; Maurice Manificat; Ivan Perrillat Boiteux	4×10 km relay	—N/a				1:29:13.9	+31.9	3rd place, bronze medalist(s)

Women

Athlete	Event	Classical		Freestyle		Final		
Athlete	Event	Time	Rank	Time	Rank	Time	Deficit	Rank
Célia Aymonier	10 km classical	—N/a				30:45.8	+2:28.0	25
Célia Aymonier	15 km skiathlon	20:00.0	25	19:57.5	17	40:32.6	+1:59.0	21
Anouk Faivre-Picon	15 km skiathlon	20:21.2	37	20:48.5	40	41:44.4	+3:10.8	38
Anouk Faivre-Picon	30 km freestyle	—N/a				1:13:29.4	+2:24.2	17
Coraline Hugue	15 km skiathlon	20:41.1	45	19:17.5	6	40:33.1	+1:59.5	22
Coraline Hugue	30 km freestyle	—N/a				1:12:29.5	+1:24.3	7
Aurore Jéan	10 km classical	—N/a				31:01.0	+2:43.2	27
Aurore Jéan	15 km skiathlon	19:55.2	20	19:57.3	16	40:27.1	+1:53.5	18
Aurore Jéan	30 km freestyle	—N/a				1:12:27.5	+1:22.3	6
Célia Aymonier; Anouk Faivre-Picon; Coraline Hugue; Aurore Jéan	4×5 km relay	—N/a				53:47.7	+45.0	4

Sprint
Men

Athlete	Event	Qualification		Quarterfinal		Semifinal		Final	
Athlete	Event	Time	Rank	Time	Rank	Time	Rank	Time	Rank
Cyril Gaillard	Sprint	3:37.86	29 Q	3:40.77	6	did not advance			
Baptiste Gros	Sprint	3:40.54	40	did not advance					
Renaud Jay	Sprint	3:35.16	14 Q	3:37.00	3	did not advance			
Cyril Miranda	Sprint	3:36.59	22 Q	3:37.57	3	did not advance			
Jean-Marc Gaillard; Cyril Miranda	Team sprint	—N/a				23:41.79	6 q	DNS	

Women

Athlete	Event	Qualification		Quarterfinal		Semifinal		Final	
Athlete	Event	Time	Rank	Time	Rank	Time	Rank	Time	Rank
Célia Aymonier	Sprint	2:42.57	40	did not advance					
Marion Buillet	Sprint	2:41.30	36	did not advance					
Aurore Jéan	Sprint	2:37.96	21 Q	2:35.55	3 q	2:38.28	6	did not advance	
Célia Aymonier; Aurore Jéan	Team sprint	—N/a				17:10.07	6	did not advance	

== Figure skating ==
France has achieved the following quota places:

Singles

Athlete	Event	SP/OD		FS/FD		Total	
Athlete	Event	Points	Rank	Points	Rank	Points	Rank
Brian Joubert	Men's singles	85.84	7 Q	145.93	14	231.77	13
Florent Amodio	Men's singles	75.58	14 Q	123.06	18	198.64	18
Maé-Bérénice Meite	Ladies' singles	58.63	9 Q	115.90	11	174.53	10
Vanessa James / Morgan Cipres	Pairs	65.36	10 Q	114.07	11	179.43	10
Pernelle Carron / Lloyd Jones	Ice dancing	58.25	13 Q	84.62	15	142.87	15
Nathalie Péchalat / Fabian Bourzat	Ice dancing	72.78	4 Q	104.44	4	177.22	4

Team trophy

Athlete	Event	Short program/Short dance						Free skate/Free dance					
Athlete	Event	Men's	Ladies'	Pairs	Ice dance	Total	Rank	Men's	Ladies'	Pairs	Ice dance	Total	Rank
Athlete	Event	Points Team points	Points Team points	Points Team points	Points Team points	Total	Rank	Points Team points	Points Team points	Points Team points	Points Team points	Total	Rank
Florent Amodio (M); Maé-Bérénice Meite (L); Vanessa James / Morgan Cipres (P); Nathalie Péchalat / Fabian Bourzat (ID)	Team trophy	79.93; 6	55.45; 5	57.45; 4	69.15; 7	22	6	did not advance					

== Freestyle skiing ==
France has achieved a total of 20 quota places for the following events. On 22 January 2014, 14 provisional slots have been filled by the French freestyle skiing team. The remainder of the team, including pending selections, will be officially announced on 27 January 2014.

Halfpipe

Athlete	Event	Qualification				Final			
Athlete	Event	Run 1	Run 2	Best	Rank	Run 1	Run 2	Best	Rank
Xavier Bertoni	Men's halfpipe	53.40	51.60	53.40	21	did not advance			
Thomas Krief	Men's halfpipe	74.80	69.60	74.80	11 Q	4.60	28.60	28.60	11
Kevin Rolland	Men's halfpipe	84.80	68.80	84.80	4 Q	88.60	29.80	88.60	3rd place, bronze medalist(s)
Benoît Valentin	Men's halfpipe	87.00	1.00	87.00	3 Q	10.00	61.00	61.00	10
Anaïs Caradeux	Women's halfpipe	74.40	6.40	74.40	9 Q	DNS			
Marie Martinod	Women's halfpipe	84.80	88.40	88.40	1 Q	84.80	85.40	85.40	2nd place, silver medalist(s)

Moguls

Athlete	Event	Qualification								Final											
Athlete	Event	Run 1				Run 2				Run 1				Run 2				Run 3			
Athlete	Event	Time	Points	Total	Rank	Time	Points	Total	Rank	Time	Points	Total	Rank	Time	Points	Total	Rank	Time	Points	Total	Rank
Anthony Benna	Men's moguls	24.15	11.85	18.46	22	24.24	10.35	16.92	13	Did not advance											
Benjamin Cavet	Men's moguls	DNF				25.37	14.08	20.12	9 Q	25.85	17.16	22.97	6 Q	26.31	16.87	22.46	8	did not advance			
Guilbaut Colas	Men's moguls	DNS								Did not advance											
Perrine Laffont	Women's moguls	31.92	16.06	21.34	5 Q	Bye				32.82	13.86	18.78	14	did not advance							

Ski cross

Athlete	Event	Seeding		Round of 16	Quarterfinal	Semifinal	Final	
Athlete	Event	Time	Rank	Position	Position	Position	Position	Rank
Arnaud Bovolenta	Men's ski cross	1:17.48	11	2 Q	2 Q	2 FA	2	2nd place, silver medalist(s)
Jean-Frédéric Chapuis	Men's ski cross	1:16.77	4	1 Q	1 Q	1 FA	1	1st place, gold medalist(s)
Jonas Devouassoux	Men's ski cross	1:18.32	21	2 Q	3	did not advance		10
Jonathan Midol	Men's ski cross	1:19.57	29	2 Q	2 Q	2 FA	3	3rd place, bronze medalist(s)
Alizée Baron	Women's ski cross	1:25.20	19	3	did not advance			20
Marielle Berger Sabbatel	Women's ski cross	1:24.62	17	3	did not advance			19
Ophélie David	Women's ski cross	1:21.46	2	1 Q	1 Q	2 FA	4	4
Marion Josserand	Women's ski cross	1:26.61	22	4	did not advance			27

Qualification legend: FA – Qualify to medal round; FB – Qualify to consolation round

Slopestyle

Athlete	Event	Qualification				Final			
Athlete	Event	Run 1	Run 2	Best	Rank	Run 1	Run 2	Best	Rank
Antoine Adelisse	Men's slopestyle	54.2	50.4	54.2	27	did not advance			
Jules Bonnaire	Men's slopestyle	2.2	40.0	40.0	30	did not advance			
Jérémy Pancras	Men's slopestyle	68.0	69.4	69.4	19	did not advance			

== Luge ==
France qualified a single female athlete in the luge.

Athlete	Event	Run 1		Run 2		Run 3		Run 4		Total	
Athlete	Event	Time	Rank	Time	Rank	Time	Rank	Time	Rank	Time	Rank
Morgane Bonnefoy	Women's singles	51.820	26	51.641	28	51.948	27	52.183	30	3:27.592	27

== Nordic combined ==
France has qualified a maximum of five athletes and a spot in the team relay. The team selection has been announced on 22 January 2014.

Athlete	Event	Ski jumping			Cross-country		Total	
Athlete	Event	Distance	Points	Rank	Time	Rank	Time	Rank
François Braud	Normal hill/10 km	95.0	113.5	24	23:57.3	17	25:09.3	20
François Braud	Large hill/10 km	121.0	105.5	19	22:31.2	5	24:05.2	13
Sébastien Lacroix	Normal hill/10 km	94.5	112.0	28	24:40.2	29	25:58.2	28
Sébastien Lacroix	Large hill/10 km	120.0	98.0	31	22:47.5	14	24:51.5	21
Maxime Laheurte	Normal hill/10 km	97.0	117.3	17	24:05.4	20	25:02.4	17
Maxime Laheurte	Large hill/10 km	125.0	108.0	15	23:55.6	29	25:19.6	27
Jason Lamy-Chappuis	Normal hill/10 km	98.5	123.7	8	25:56.7	41	26:27.7	35
Jason Lamy-Chappuis	Large hill/10 km	133.5	120.7	5	23:10.9	22	23:43.9	7
Francois Braud; Sébastien Lacroix; Maxime Laheurte; Jason Lamy-Chappuis	Team large hill/4×5 km	502.5	455.2	4	47:51.3	4	48:26.3	4

== Short track speed skating ==
France qualified 1 woman and 3 men for the Olympics during World Cup 3 and 4 in November 2013.

Men

Athlete	Event	Heat		Quarterfinal		Semifinal		Final	
Athlete	Event	Time	Rank	Time	Rank	Time	Rank	Time	Rank
Maxime Chataignier	1000 m	2:20.479	4	did not advance					31
Maxime Chataignier	1500 m	2:17.938	4	—N/a		did not advance			23
Thibaut Fauconnet	500 m	42.368	4	did not advance					26
Thibaut Fauconnet	1000 m	2:00.795	4	did not advance					30
Thibaut Fauconnet	1500 m	2:14.054	3 Q	—N/a		PEN		did not advance	
Sébastien Lepape	500 m	42.167	3	did not advance					22
Sébastien Lepape	1000 m	1:49.311	3 ADV	1:25.368	3	did not advance			12
Sébastien Lepape	1500 m	2:15.806	3 Q	—N/a		2:23.995	3 FB	2:21.483	8

Women

Athlete	Event	Heat		Quarterfinal		Semifinal		Final	
Athlete	Event	Time	Rank	Time	Rank	Time	Rank	Time	Rank
Véronique Pierron	500 m	1:12.278	4	did not advance					29
Véronique Pierron	1000 m	1:33.022	2 Q	PEN		did not advance			17
Véronique Pierron	1500 m	2:55.658	5 ADV	—N/a		2:20.216	4 FB	2:26.066	10

Qualification legend: ADV – Advanced due to being impeded by another skater; FA – Qualify to medal round; FB – Qualify to consolation round

== Ski jumping ==
France has received the following start quotas. On 27 January 2014, only four ski jumpers from the French team had qualified for the Games.

Athlete	Event	Qualification			First round			Final			Total	
Athlete	Event	Distance	Points	Rank	Distance	Points	Rank	Distance	Points	Rank	Points	Rank
Ronan Lamy Chappuis	Men's normal hill	91.0	106.2	33 Q	91.0	111.0	40	did not advance				
Ronan Lamy Chappuis	Men's large hill	121.5	99.8	28 Q	125.0	108.2	36	did not advance				
Julia Clair	Women's normal hill	—N/a			95.5	113.8	18	91.5	104.7	22	218.5	19
Léa Lemare	Women's normal hill	—N/a			93.0	107.9	22	93.0	110.2	16	218.1	20
Coline Mattel	Women's normal hill	—N/a			99.5	125.7	2	97.5	119.5	8	245.2	3rd place, bronze medalist(s)

== Snowboarding ==
France has achieved a total of 14 quota places in snowboarding. On 22 January 2014, eight provisional slots have been filled by the French freestyle skiing team. The remainder of the team, including pending selections, was officially announced on 27 January 2014.

Alpine

Athlete	Event	Qualification		Round of 16	Quarterfinal	Semifinal	Final	
Athlete	Event	Time	Rank	Opposition Time	Opposition Time	Opposition Time	Opposition Time	Rank
Sylvain Dufour	Men's giant slalom	1:39.76	15 Q	Wild (RUS); L +5.65	did not advance			
Sylvain Dufour	Men's slalom	59.43	10 Q	Galmarini (SUI); L DSQ	did not advance			

Freestyle

Athlete	Event	Qualification				Semifinal				Final			
Athlete	Event	Run 1	Run 2	Best	Rank	Run 1	Run 2	Best	Rank	Run 1	Run 2	Best	Rank
Johann Baisamy	Men's halfpipe	71.25	36.75	71.25	9 QS	18.50	37.00	37.00	10	did not advance			
Arthur Longo	Men's halfpipe	79.25	20.75	79.25	4 QS	12.00	31.75	31.75	11	did not advance			
Clémence Grimal	Women's halfpipe	16.00	66.50	66.50	8 QS	14.00	38.25	38.25	8	did not advance			
Sophie Rodriguez	Women's halfpipe	78.50	25.50	78.50	3 QF	Bye				77.75	79.50	79.50	7
Mirabelle Thovex	Women's halfpipe	71.75	69.75	71.75	6 QS	70.75	39.75	70.75	5 Q	67.00	34.75	67.00	10

Qualification Legend: QF – Qualify directly to final; QS – Qualify to semifinal

Snowboard cross

Athlete	Event	Seeding		Round of 16	Quarterfinal	Semifinal	Final	
Athlete	Event	Time	Rank	Position	Position	Position	Position	Rank
Paul-Henri de Le Rue	Men's snowboard cross	CAN		3 Q	2 Q	2 FA	4	4
Tony Ramoin	Men's snowboard cross	CAN		2 Q	5	did not advance		=17
Pierre Vaultier	Men's snowboard cross	CAN		1 Q	1 Q	1 FA	1	1st place, gold medalist(s)
Déborah Anthonioz	Women's snowboard cross	1:24.78	17	—N/a	4	did not advance		15
Charlotte Bankes	Women's snowboard cross	1:23.12	5	—N/a	5	did not advance		17
Nelly Moenne Loccoz	Women's snowboard cross	1:23.50	8	—N/a	2 Q	4 FA	5	5
Chloé Trespeuch	Women's snowboard cross	1:24.47	13	—N/a	1 Q	2 FA	3	3rd place, bronze medalist(s)

Qualification legend: FA – Qualify to medal round; FB – Qualify to consolation round

== Speed skating ==
Based on the results from the fall World Cups during the 2013–14 ISU Speed Skating World Cup season, France has earned the following start quotas:

Men

Athlete	Event	Final	
Athlete	Event	Time	Rank
Alexis Contin	5000 m	DNS	
Ewen Fernandez	1500 m	1:52.70	40
Ewen Fernandez	5000 m	6:31.08	18
Benjamin Macé	1000 m	1:10.80	29
Benjamin Macé	1500 m	1:49.34	32

Team pursuit

Athlete	Event	Quarterfinal	Semifinal	Final	
Athlete	Event	Opposition Time	Opposition Time	Opposition Time	Rank
Alexis Contin; Ewen Fernandez; Benjamin Macé	Men's team pursuit	Netherlands; L 3:53.17	Did not advance	Final D United States; L 3:51.76	8
