= Filip Flisar =

Slovenian freestyle skier (born 1987)

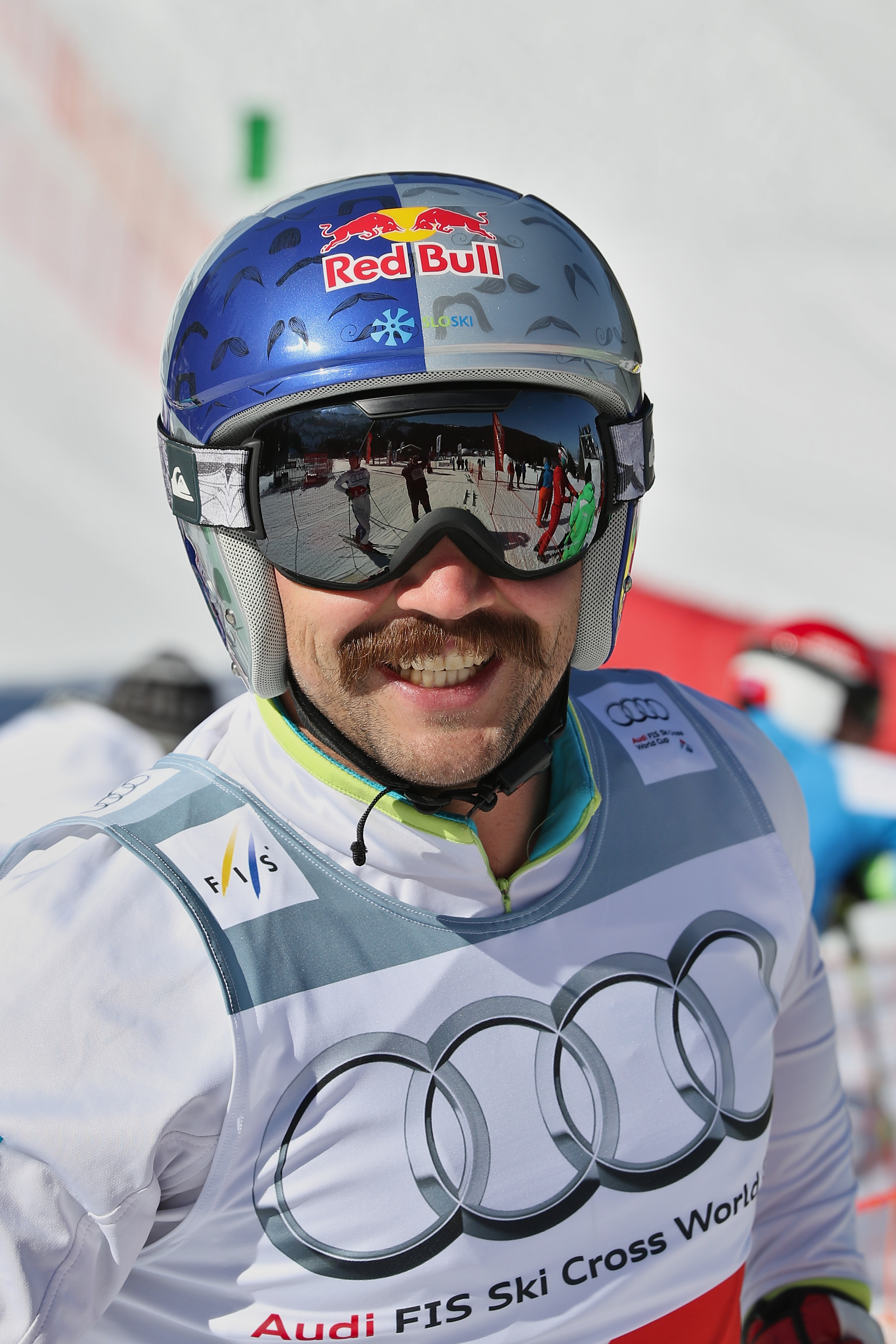

Personal information
- Born: 28 September 1987 (age 39) Maribor, SR Slovenia, SFR Yugoslavia

Skiing career
- Sport: Alpine skiing
- Disciplines: Ski cross
- World Cup debut: 6 March 2008

Olympics
- Teams: 3 – (2010, 2014, 2018)

World Championships
- Teams: 5 – (2011, 2013, 2015, 2017, 2019)
- Medals: 1 (1 gold)

World Cup
- Seasons: 2008–2020
- Wins: 7
- Podiums: 16
- Discipline titles: 1 – SX (2012)
Medal record
Representing Slovenia
Freestyle skiing
FIS Freestyle Ski and Snowboard World Championships
| Gold medal – first place | 2015 Kreischberg | Ski cross |
X Games
| Silver medal – second place | 2012 Aspen | Ski cross |

Filip Flisar (born 28 September 1987) is a retired Slovenian freestyle skier who competed in ski cross discipline.

== Career ==
=== Alpine skiing career ===
Flisar started his career as an alpine skier in fast disciplines. He competed at two World Junior Alpine Skiing Championships and a couple of FIS Ski European Cup events, but had no notable success.

=== 2008: Freestyle skiing career ===
Flisar joined the FIS Freestyle Skiing World Cup in 2008. His World Cup debut performance in the 2007–08 season was a ski cross competition on 6 March 2008 in Grindelwald, Switzerland where he did not receive any points. In the 2008–09 season he also competed in his first and also the only half-pipe World Cup event.

=== 2010: First Olympics ===
He represented Slovenia at the 2010 Winter Olympics in Vancouver, where he competed in ski cross and finished in eighth place. At the 2011 FIS Freestyle World Ski Championships in Deer Valley, where he competed in men's ski cross, he finished in eleventh place.

=== 2012: Winter X Games medal ===
In 2012, at the Winter X Games XVI in Aspen, he achieved second place in the ski cross event.

=== 2012: Ski Cross title ===
On 11 January 2012 in Alpe d'Huez he won his first World Cup victory. He won a total of three World Cup races in that season. In the 2011–12 season he won the discipline title in ski cross and was fifth in overall ranking.

=== 2014: Olympics ===
In Sochi At 2014 Winter Olympics he competed in men's ski cross where he reached the semi-finals. In the small final he placed second, behind Egor Korotkov and ahead of Armin Niederer and Florian Eigler, thus ranking overall sixth in the competition.

=== 2015: Ski Cross World Champion ===
On 25 January 2015 he produced a stunning performance in the final of FIS Freestyle Ski and Snowboarding World Championships 2015 ski cross and managed to climb from third to first place in the last few meters of the race. He won his and Slovenia's first ever gold medal at the World Championship in Freestyle skiing. He shared the podium with Jean-Frédéric Chapuis, defending World and Olympic Champion, who won the silver medal and Victor Öhling Norberg, who got bronze.

=== 2016: Mountain bike racing career ===
He achieved tenth place in men's four-cross at the 2016 World Championships in Val di Sole.

== World Cup ==
=== Standings ===
| Season | Overall | SX | HP |
|---|---|---|---|
| 2008/09 | 167 | 50 | 45 |
| 2009/10 | 107 | 37 | – |
| 2010/11 | 45 | 13 | – |
| 2011/12 | 5 | 1st place, gold medalist(s) | – |
| 2012/13 | 24 | 6 | – |
| 2013/14 | 201 | 45 | – |
| 2014/15 | 59 | 19 | – |
| 2015/16 | 25 | 5 | – |
| 2016/17 | 22 | 4 | – |
| 2017/18 | 91 | 20 | – |
| 2018/19 | 77 | 18 | – |
| 2019/20 | 140 | 31 | – |

=== Wins ===
| No. | Season | Date | Location | Event |
|---|---|---|---|---|
| 1 | 2011/12 | 11 January 2012 | (France) Alpe d'Huez | SX |
| 2 | 2011/12 | 26 February 2012 | (Germany) Bischofswiesen | SX |
| 3 | 2011/12 | 10 March 2012 | (Switzerland) Grindelwald | SX |
| 4 | 2012/13 | 13 December 2012 | (United States) Telluride | SX |
| 5 | 2015/16 | 13 February 2016 | (Sweden) Idre Fjall | SX |
| 6 | 2016/17 | 21 December 2016 | (Italy) Innichen | SX |
| 7 | 2016/17 | 22 December 2016 | (Italy) Innichen | SX |
