= Freestyle skiing at the 2014 Winter Olympics =

Freestyle skiing at the XXII Olympic Winter Games
- Pictograms for Aerials, Halfpipe, Moguls, Ski Cross, and Slopestyle.
- Venue: Rosa Khutor Extreme Park, Krasnaya Polyana, Russia
- Dates: 6–21 February 2014
- Competitors: 277 from 30 nations

Freestyle skiing at the 2014 Winter Olympics was held at the Rosa Khutor Extreme Park near Krasnaya Polyana, Russia. The ten events took place between 6–21 February 2014.

In April 2011 the International Olympic Committee approved the addition of the halfpipe event for both, men and women. In July 2011, slopestyle was also added to the program, therefore a total of four new events were added to the freestyle skiing program.

== Competition schedule ==
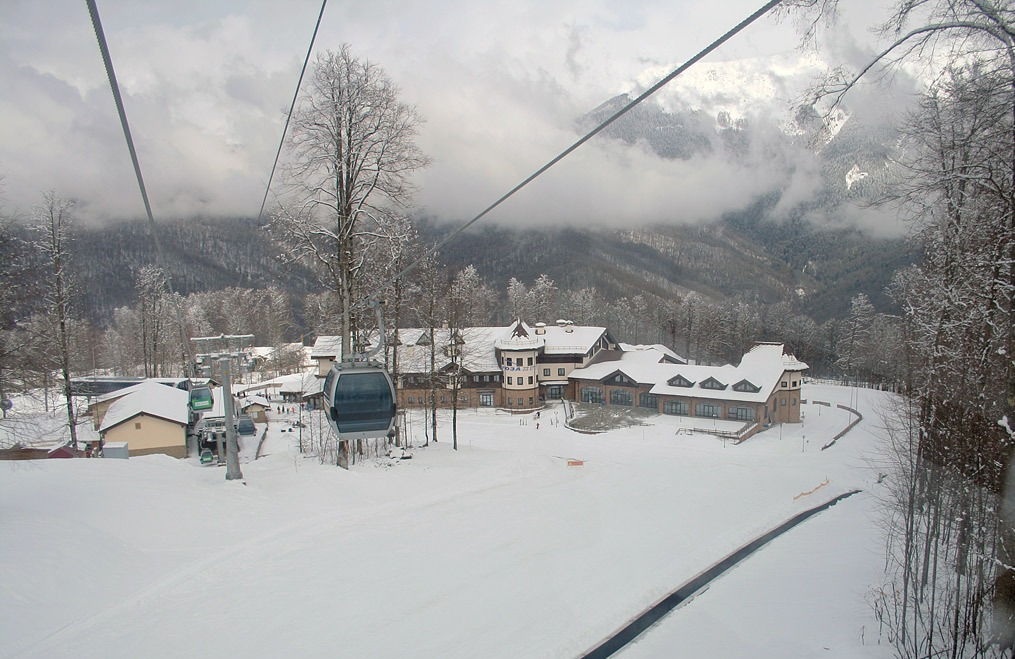
Rosa Khutor Alpine Resort, the venue for freestyle skiing

The following is the competition schedule for all ten events.

All times are (UTC+4).

Date	Time	Event
6 February	18:00	Women's moguls qualification
8 February	18:00	Women's moguls qualification 2
8 February	22:00	Women's moguls final
10 February	18:00	Men's moguls qualification
10 February	22:00	Men's moguls final
11 February	10:00	Women's slopestyle qualification
11 February	13:00	Women's slopestyle final
13 February	10:15	Men's slopestyle qualification
13 February	13:30	Men's slopestyle final
14 February	17:45	Women's aerials qualification
14 February	21:30	Women's aerials final
17 February	17:45	Men's aerials qualification
17 February	21:30	Men's aerials final
18 February	17:45	Men's halfpipe qualification
18 February	21:30	Men's halfpipe final
20 February	11:45	Men's ski cross qualification
20 February	13:30	Men's ski cross finals
20 February	18:30	Women's halfpipe qualification
20 February	21:30	Women's halfpipe final
21 February	11:45	Women's ski cross qualification
21 February	13:30	Women's ski cross finals

== Medal summary ==
=== Medal table ===
* Host nation (Russia)

Rank	Nation	Gold	Silver	Bronze	Total
1	Canada	4	4	1	9
2	United States	3	2	2	7
3	Belarus	2	0	0	2
4	France	1	2	2	5
5	Australia	0	1	1	2
5	China	0	1	1	2
7	Japan	0	0	1	1
7	Russia*	0	0	1	1
7	Sweden	0	0	1	1
Totals (9 entries)		10	10	10	30

=== Men's events ===
Event	Gold		Silver		Bronze	
aerials	Anton Kushnir; Belarus	134.50	David Morris; Australia	110.41	Jia Zongyang; China	95.06
halfpipe	David Wise; United States	92.00	Mike Riddle; Canada	90.60	Kevin Rolland; France	88.60
moguls	Alexandre Bilodeau; Canada	26.31	Mikaël Kingsbury; Canada	24.71	Alexandr Smyshlyaev; Russia	24.34
slopestyle	Joss Christensen; United States	95.80	Gus Kenworthy; United States	93.60	Nick Goepper; United States	92.40
ski cross	Jean-Frédéric Chapuis; France		Arnaud Bovolenta; France		Jonathan Midol; France	

=== Women's events ===
Event	Gold		Silver		Bronze	
aerials	Alla Tsuper; Belarus	98.01	Xu Mengtao; China	83.50	Lydia Lassila; Australia	72.12
halfpipe	Maddie Bowman; United States	89.00	Marie Martinod; France	85.40	Ayana Onozuka; Japan	83.20
moguls	Justine Dufour-Lapointe; Canada	22.44	Chloé Dufour-Lapointe; Canada	21.66	Hannah Kearney; United States	21.49
slopestyle	Dara Howell; Canada	94.20	Devin Logan; United States	85.40	Kim Lamarre; Canada	85.00
ski cross	Marielle Thompson; Canada		Kelsey Serwa; Canada		Anna Holmlund; Sweden	

== Qualification ==
A maximum of 282 quota spots were available to athletes to compete at the games. A maximum of 26 athletes could be entered by a National Olympic Committee, with a maximum of 14 men or 14 women. The five different events had different quota amounts allocated to them.

== Participating nations ==
276 athletes from 30 nations participated, with number of athletes in parentheses. Four nations, Belgium, Brazil, The British Virgin Islands and Chile made their Olympic debuts in the sport. Paraguay made its first appearance at the Winter Olympics, with its only athlete competing in freestyle skiing.

- Australia (21)
- Austria (11)
- Belarus (6)
- Belgium (1)
- Brazil (1)
- British Virgin Islands (1)
- Canada (26)
- Chile (2)
- China (9)
- Czech Republic (6)
- Finland (9)
- France (21)
- Germany (10)
- Great Britain (6)
- Italy (4)
- Japan (10)
- Kazakhstan (8)
- New Zealand (8)
- Norway (11)
- Paraguay (1)
- Poland (1)
- Russia (26)
- Slovakia (2)
- Slovenia (1)
- South Korea (5)
- Spain (1)
- Sweden (11)
- Switzerland (24)
- Ukraine (7)
- United States (26)

== Controversy ==
Both Canada and Slovenia both appealed separately to the Court of Arbitration for Sport that the three French athletes in the Big Final of the men's ski cross final, had their pants illegally changed by their coach. They argued it gave the three an aerodynamic advantage over the rest of the field. Both countries first appealed to the International Ski Federation, but were rejected since they appealed hours after the end of the competition (when the deadline was 15 minutes after the close of the race). The appeal to the court was ultimately unsuccessful as well, because the Court agreed with the ski federation that the appeal was filed past the deadline.

== Notes ==
Alexandre Bilodeau became the first freestyle skiing gold medalist to defend his Olympic title, winning the men's moguls, following up his 2010 Olympics gold in men's moguls. Justine Dufour-Lapointe became the youngest freestyle skiing Olympic champion ever in the women's mogul event.
