= Eigler =

Eigler is a surname. Notable people with the surname include:

- Christian Eigler (born 1984), German footballer
- Don Eigler (born 1953), American physicist
- Florian Eigler (born 1990), German freestyle skier
