= Christian Mithassel =

Norwegian freestyle skier

Personal information
- Nationality: Norwegian
- Born: 29 September 1987 (age 37); Oslo, Norway

Sport
- Sport: Freestyle skiing

Christian Mithassel (born 29 September 1987) is a Norwegian freestyle skier. He was born in Oslo. He competed in ski cross at the World Ski Championships 2013, and at the 2014 Winter Olympics in Sochi, in ski-cross.
