= John Eklund (skier) =

Swedish freestyle skier (born 1993)

Personal information
- Nationality: Swedish
- Born: 21 September 1993 (age 31)

Sport
- Sport: Freestyle skiing

John Eklund (born 21 September 1993) is a Swedish freestyle skier. He competed in ski cross at the World Ski Championships 2013, and at the 2014 Winter Olympics in Sochi, in ski-cross.
