= Zdeněk Šafář =

Czech freestyle skier

Zdeněk Šafář (born 27 July 1978 in Trutnov) is a Czech freestyle skier who specializes in the skicross discipline.

He made his World Cup debut in March 2003 in Les Contamines, and collected his first World Cup points in January 2004, with a thirteenth place in Pozza di Fassa. The next year he won finished ninth at the 2005 Winter Universiade and placed among the top World Cup ten for the first time, with a fifteenth place in Les Contamines. He has performed consistently since, with the 2006–07 season as his best, finishing among the top ten in two of the three races he competed in. He has competed at the 2005 and 2007 World Championships.

He participated in the 2010 Olympics in the men's skicross competition, but crashed in qualifications.
