= Thomas Fischer (skier) =

German freestyle skier (born 1986)

Personal information
- Nationality: German
- Born: 7 February 1986 (age 39); Bad Reichenhall, West Germany

Sport
- Sport: Freestyle skiing

Thomas Fischer (born 7 February 1986) is a German freestyle skier. He was born in Bad Reichenhall. He competed in ski cross at the World Ski Championships 2013, and at the 2014 Winter Olympics in Sochi, in ski-cross.
