= Andreas Schauer =

German freestyle skier (born 1986)

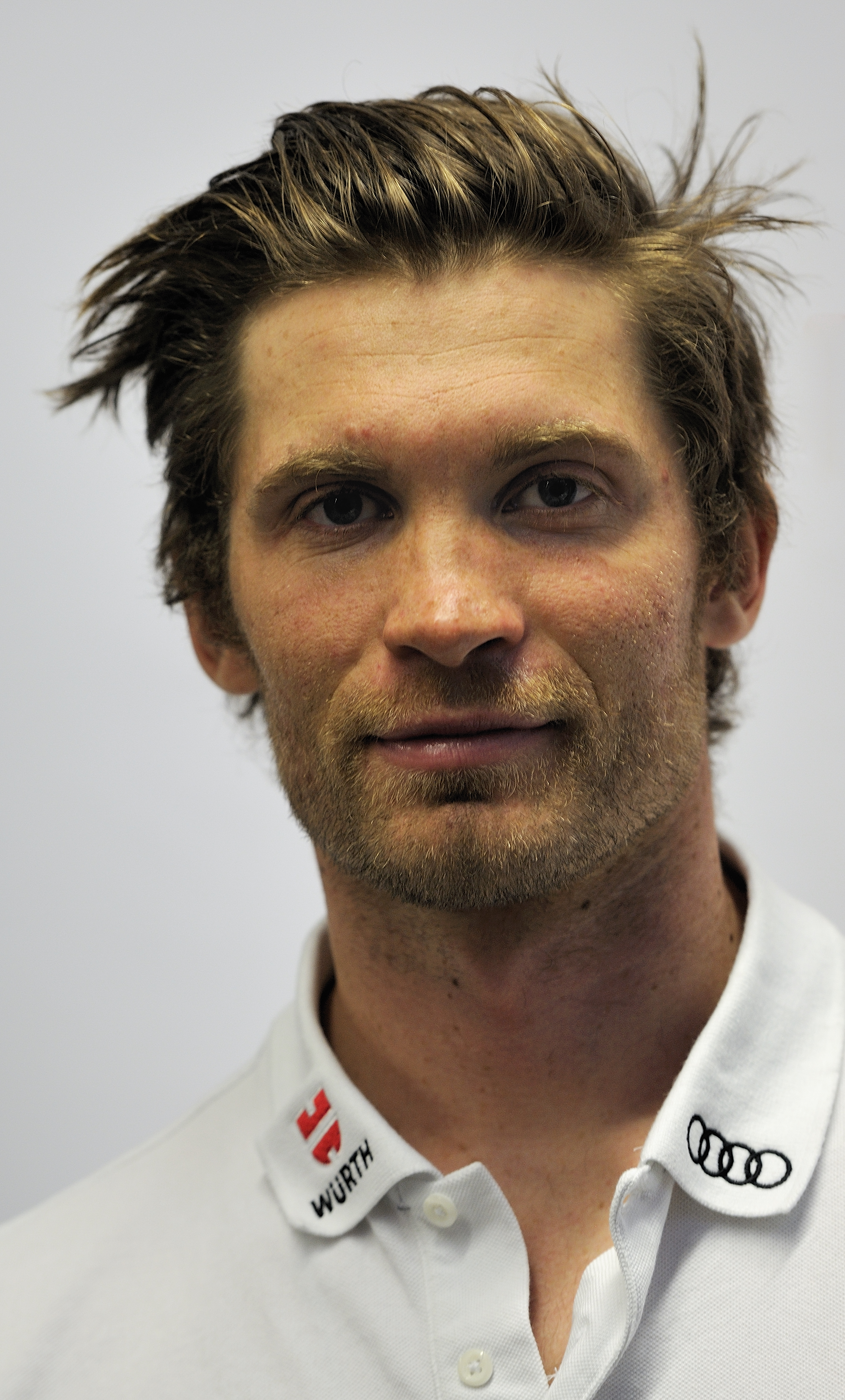
- Schauer in 2014

Personal information
- Nationality: German
- Born: 18 January 1986 (age 39); Bad Tölz, West Germany

Sport
- Country: Germany
- Sport: Freestyle skiing

Andreas Schauer (born 18 January 1986) is a German freestyle skier. He was born in Bad Tölz. He competed in ski cross at the World Ski Championships 2013, and at the 2014 Winter Olympics in Sochi, in ski-cross.
