= Sergey Mozhaev =

Russian freestyle skier

Personal information
- Nationality: Russian
- Born: 22 February 1988 (age 37)

Sport
- Sport: Freestyle skiing

Sergey Mozhaev (born 22 February 1988) is a Russian freestyle skier. He competed in ski cross at the World Ski Championships 2013, and at the 2014 Winter Olympics in Sochi, in ski-cross.
