= Victor Öhling Norberg =

Swedish freestyle skier (born 1990)

Medal record

Men's freestyle skiing

Representing Sweden

World Championships
Gold medal – first place	2017 Sierra Nevada	Ski cross
Bronze medal – third place	2015 Kreischberg	Ski cross

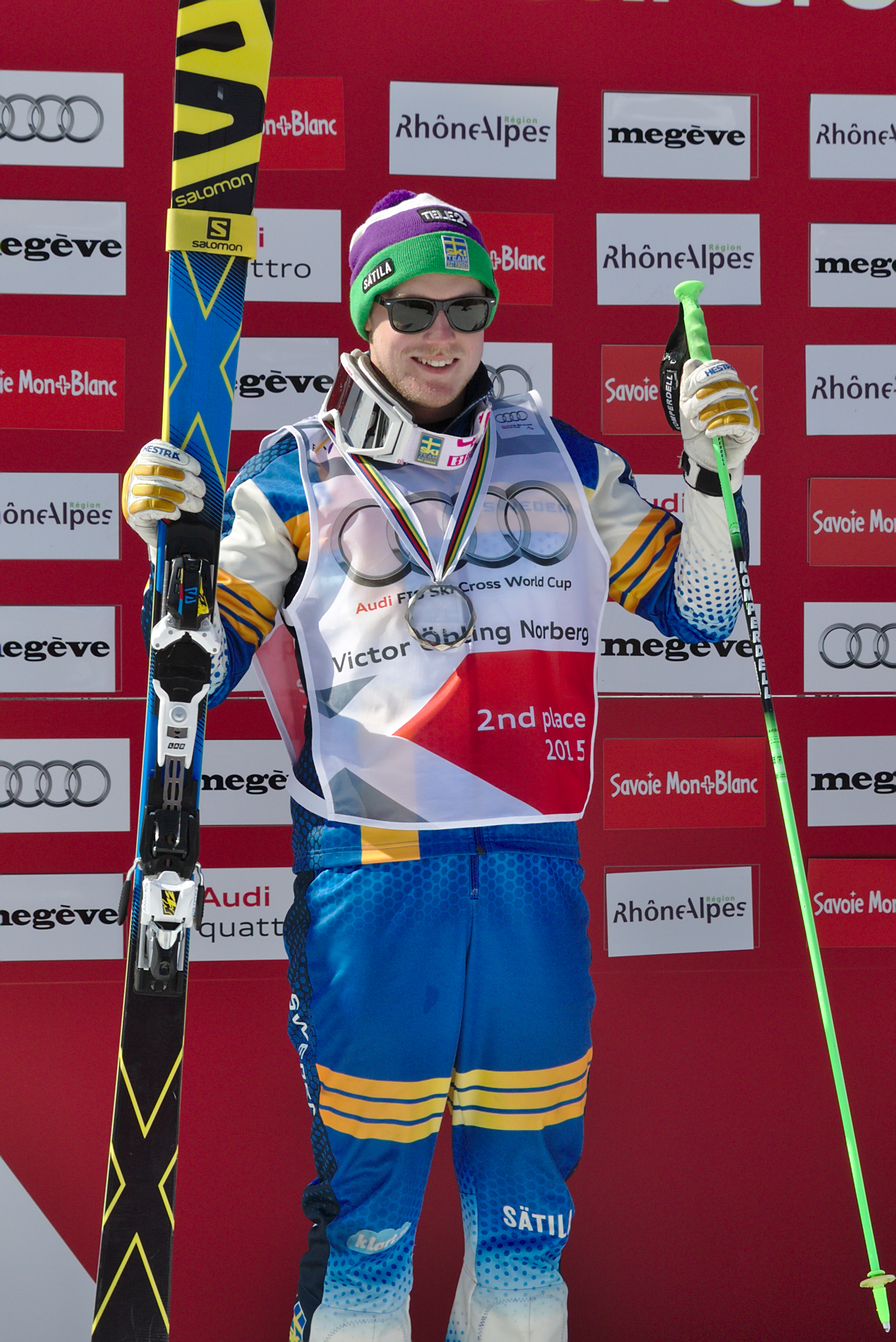
Victor Öhling Norberg during the March 2015 World Cup finals in Megève.

Victor Öhling Norberg (born 22 May 1990) is a Swedish freestyle skier. Born in Bruksvallarna, he competed in ski cross at the World Ski Championships 2013, and at the 2014 Winter Olympics as well as at the 2018 Winter Olympics, in ski-cross.

He won a gold-medal during the FIS Freestyle Ski and Snowboarding World Championships 2017 in Sierra Nevada.

On 23 April 2019, he announced his retirement from skicrossing.

== World Cup results ==
=== Season titles ===
Season	Discipline
2013–2014	Ski cross

=== Wins ===
Season	Date	Location
2012–2013	19 Feb 2013	Sochi, Russia
2013–2014	15 March 2014	Åre, Sweden
2014–2015	6 Feb 2015	Arosa, Switzerland
2014–2015	7 Feb 2015	Arosa, Switzerland
2014–2015	14 Feb 2015	Åre, Sweden
