= Daniel Bohnacker =

German freestyle skier (born 1990)

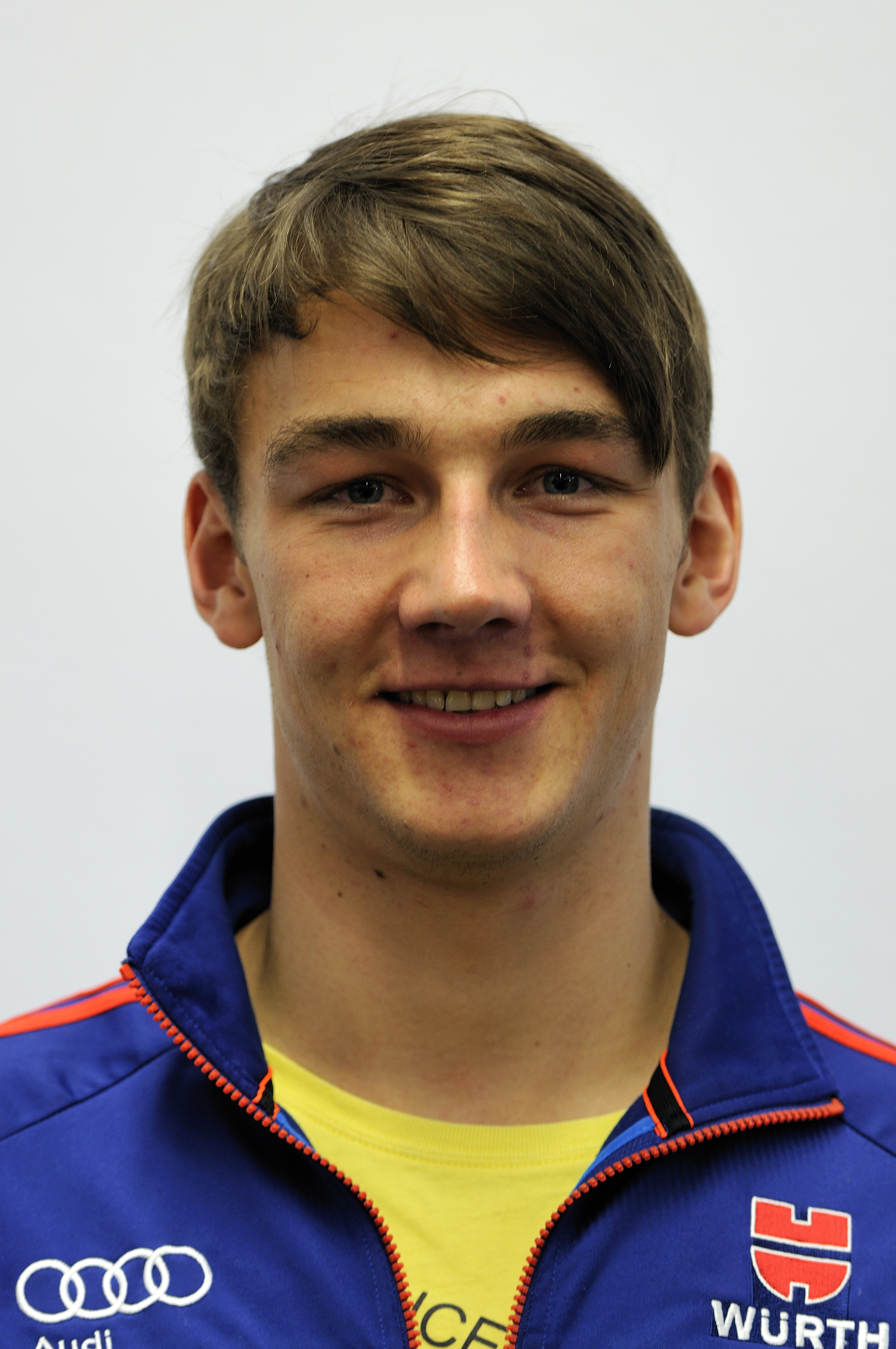
Daniel Bohnacker in 2014

Daniel Bohnacker (born 21 February 1990) is a German freestyle skier. He was born in Blaubeuren. He competed in ski cross at the World Ski Championships 2013, and at the 2014 Winter Olympics in Sochi, in ski-cross.
