= Anton Grimus =

Australian freestyle skier (born 1990)

Personal information
- Born: 27 December 1990 (age 35) Mansfield, Victoria, Australia
- Height: 195 cm (6 ft 5 in) (2014)
- Weight: 105 kg (231 lb) (2014)

Sport
- Country: Australia
- Sport: Freestyle Skiing
Medal record
New Zealand Winter Games
Silver medal – second place	2011 Cardrona	Ski Cross

Anton Grimus (born 27 December 1990) is an Australian freestyle skier. He was born in Mansfield. He competed in ski cross at the World Ski Championships 2013, and at the 2014 Winter Olympics in Sochi, in ski-cross.
