= Florian Eigler =

German freestyle skier (born 1990)

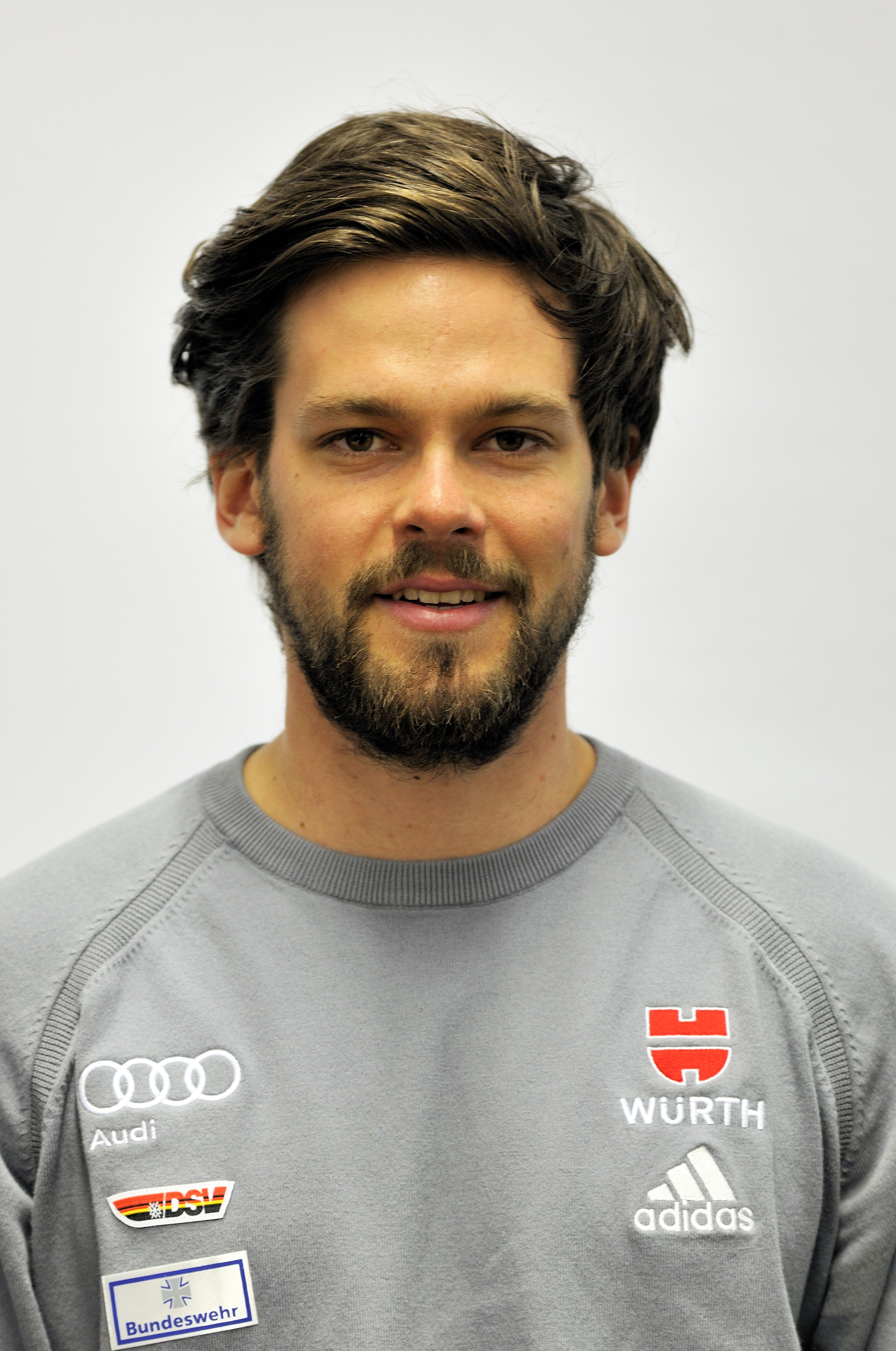
- Florian Eigler at the Olympic clothing Erding 2014

Personal information
- Nationality: German
- Born: 12 May 1990 (age 34)

Sport
- Sport: Freestyle skiing

Florian Eigler (born 12 May 1990) is a German freestyle skier. He was born in Füssen. He made his FIS World Cup debut for Germany in 2010. He competed at the 2014 Winter Olympics in Sochi, in ski-cross.
