= Louis-Pierre Hélie =

Canadian alpine and freestyle skier (born 1986)

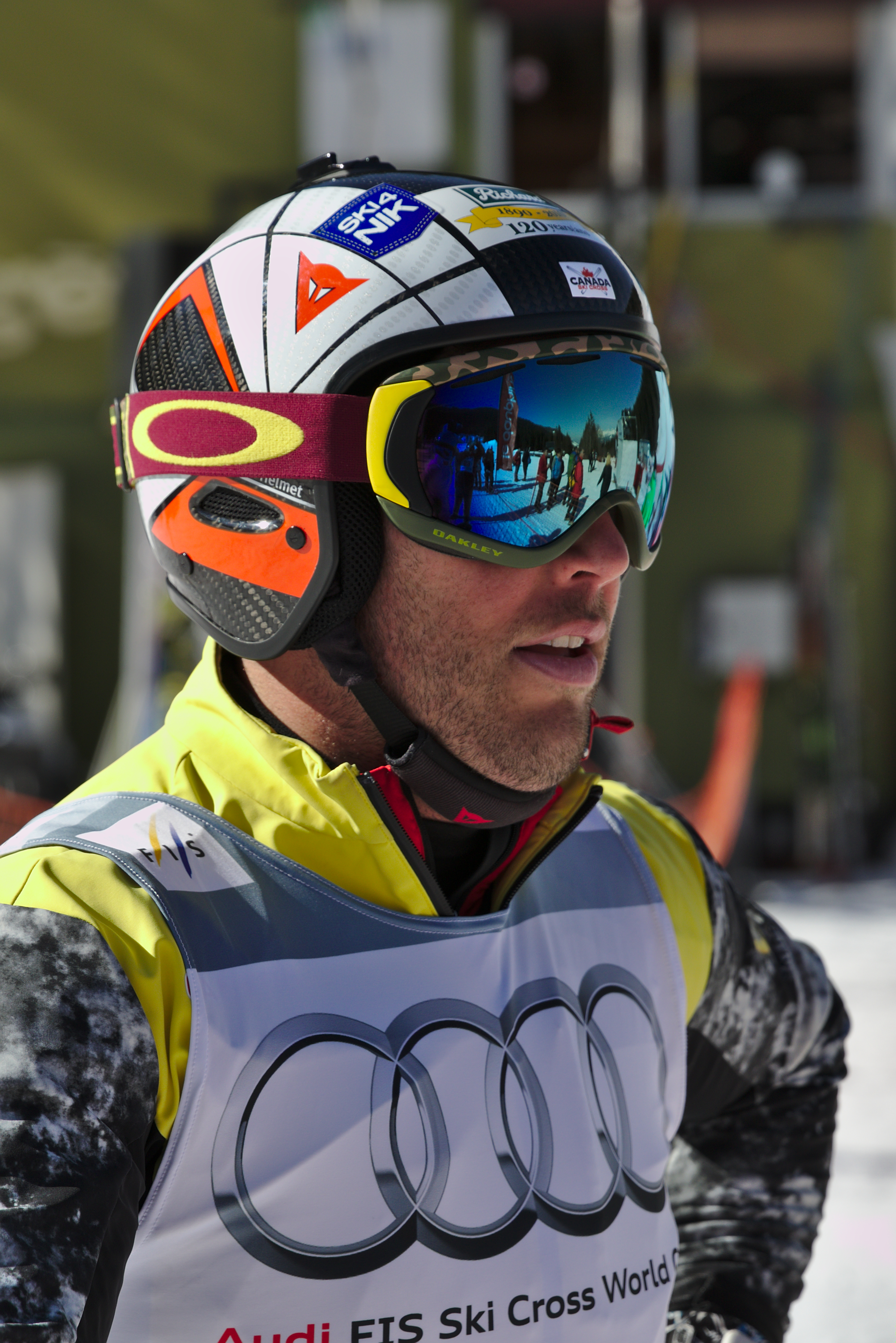

Personal information
- Nickname: Leup
- Born: 1 January 1986 (age 40) Berthierville, Quebec, Canada
- Height: 5 ft 9 in (175 cm)
- Weight: 198 lb (90 kg)

Sport
- Sport: Skiing
- Club: Mont-Sainte-Anne
- Updated on 18 February 2010

Louis-Pierre Hélie (born 1 January 1986 at Berthierville, Quebec) is a Canadian alpine and freestyle skier.

He competed at the 2010 Winter Olympics in Vancouver in the men's super combined competition. He made a total of 30 starts on the Alpine Skiing World Cup, with his best result being a 13th place at the Val Gardena downhill in 2010. In 2012 he switched from alpine skiing to ski cross, making his debut on the FIS Freestyle Skiing World Cup at the first ski cross event of the 2012–13 season in Nakiska.
