= Thomas Borge Lie =

Norwegian freestyle skier

Personal information
- Nationality: Norwegian
- Born: 25 February 1985 (age 40); Oslo, Norway

Sport
- Sport: Freestyle skiing

Thomas Borge Lie (born 25 February 1985) is a Norwegian freestyle skier. He was born in Oslo. He competed at the 2014 Winter Olympics in Sochi, in ski-cross.
