= Michael Forslund =

Swedish freestyle skier (born 1986)

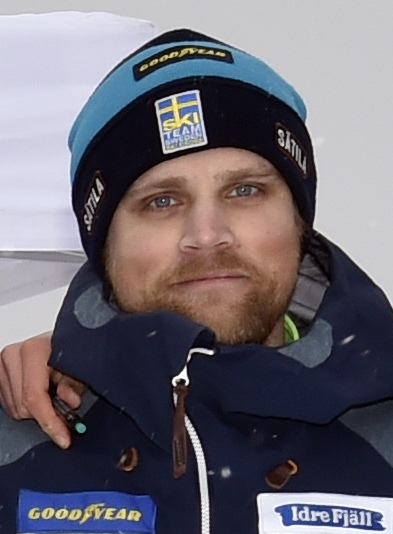

Personal information
- Born: 22 July 1986 Mora, Sweden

Sport
- Sport: Skiing
- Updated on 28 March 2013

Michael Forslund (born 22 July 1986 in Mora) is a Swedish freestyle skier, specializing in ski cross.

Forslund competed at the 2010 Winter Olympics for Sweden. He placed 21st in the qualifying round in ski cross, to advance to the knockout stages. In the first round, he finished 4th in his heat, and did not advance.

As of March 2013, his best showing at the World Championships is 15th, in 2011.

Forslund made his World Cup debut in January 2007. As of March 2013, his best World Cup finish was 4th, in 2012/13 at Nakiska. His best World Cup overall finish in ski cross is 24th, in 2010/11.
