= Arnaud Bovolenta =

French freestyle skier

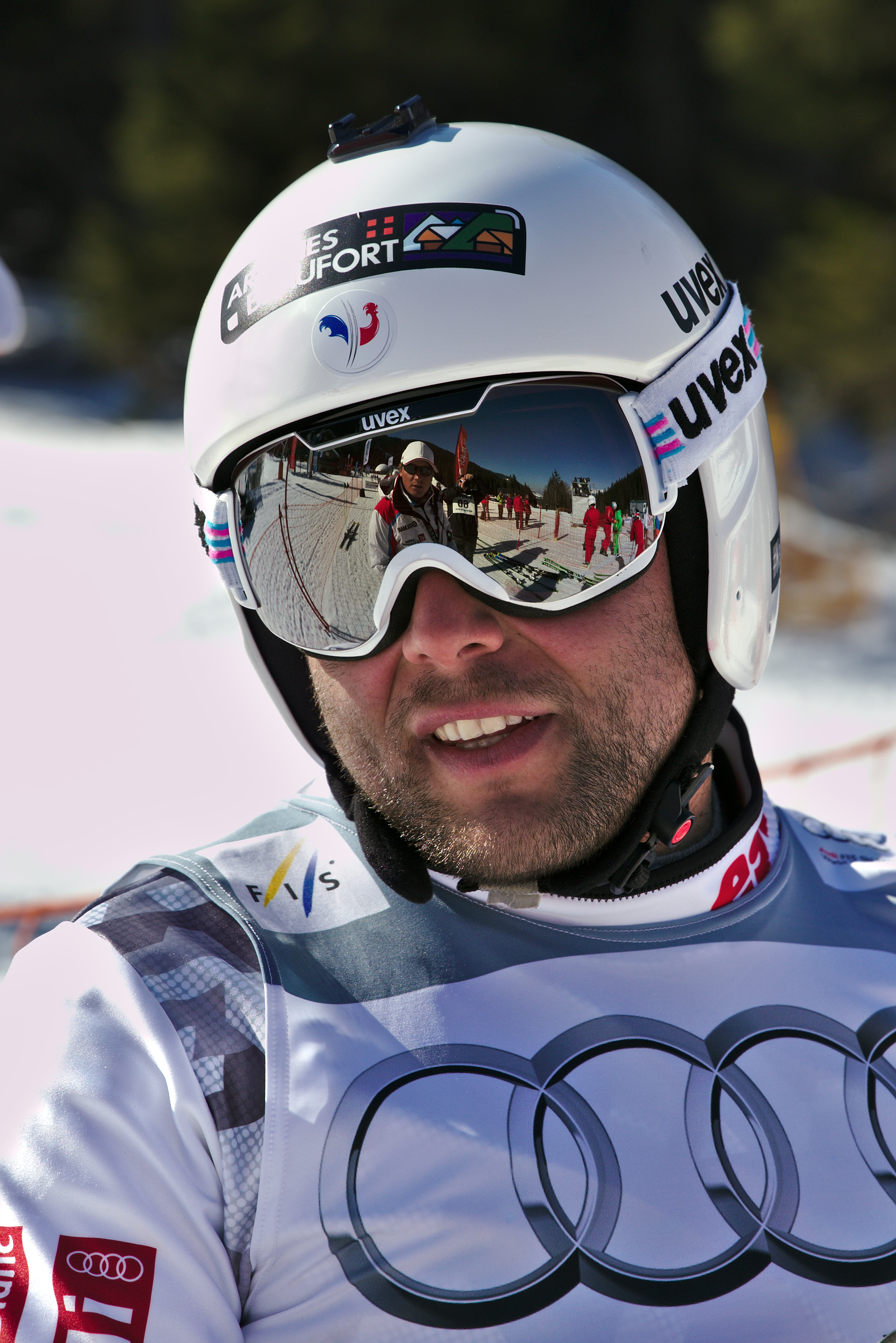

Personal information
- Born: 6 September 1988 (age 37) Albertville, France
- Height: 170 cm (5 ft 7 in)
Medal record
Men's freestyle skiing
Representing France
Olympic Games
Silver medal – second place	2014 Sochi	Ski cross

Arnaud Bovolenta (born 6 September 1988) is a French freestyle skier. He was born in Albertville. He competed in ski cross at the World Ski Championships 2011 and at the 2014 Winter Olympics in Sochi, where he took the silver medal. He took his first podium in the FIS Freestyle Skiing World Cup in December 2016, when he finished third in the sixth round of the 2016-17 season in Innichen.
