= Andreas Matt =

Austrian freestyle skier (born 1982)

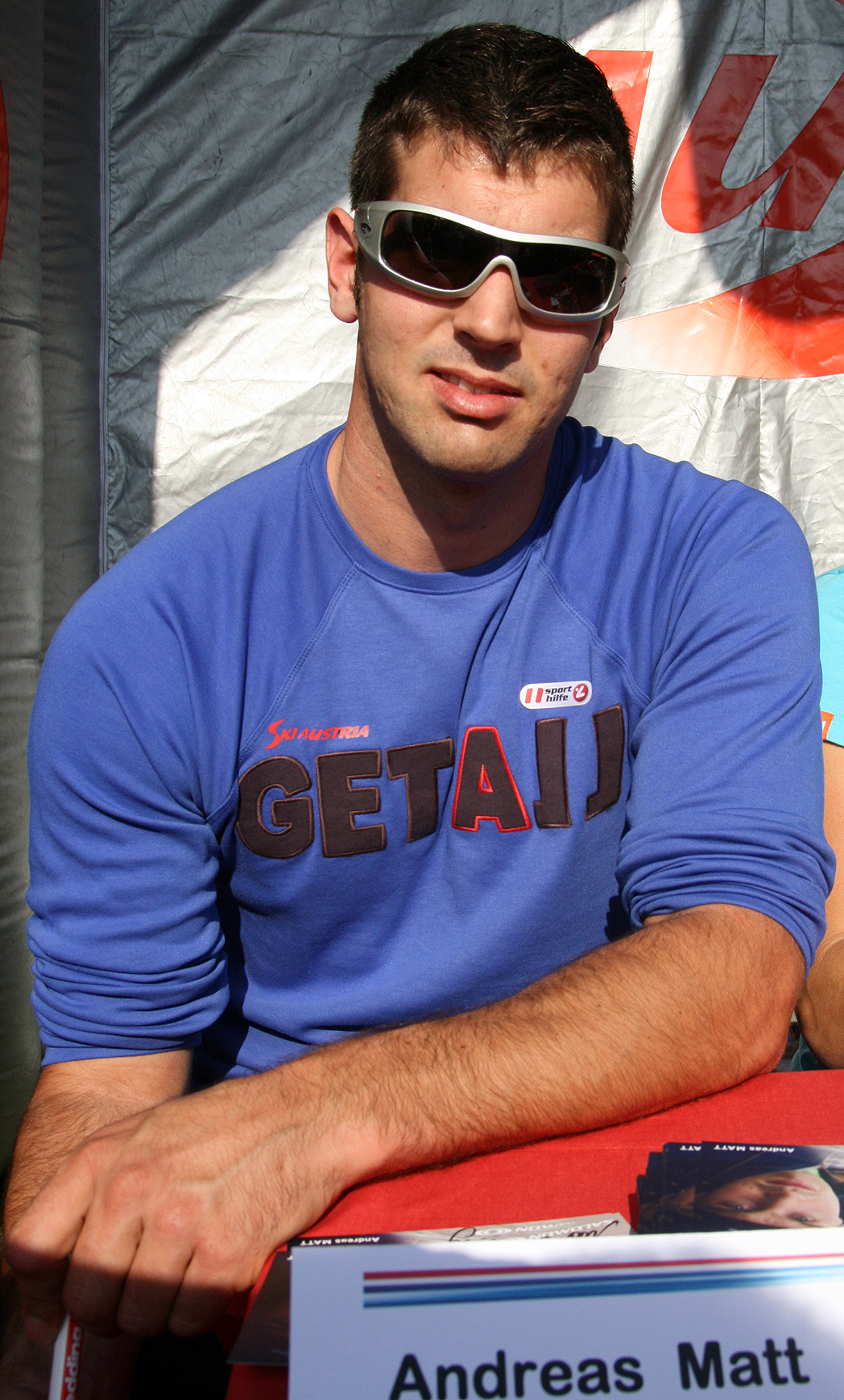
- Andreas Matt

Medal record

Men's freestyle skiing

Representing Austria

Olympic Games
Silver medal – second place	2010 Vancouver	Ski cross

FIS Freestyle World Ski Championships
Gold medal – first place	2009 Inawashiro	Ski cross
Bronze medal – third place	2011 Deer Valley	Ski cross

Andreas Matt (born 19 October 1982) is an Austrian retired freestyle skier who specialised in the skicross discipline. He is the brother of alpine skiers Mario Matt and Michael Matt.

== Career ==
He made his World Cup debut in January 2004 in Les Contamines, and finished among the top thirty for the first time three days later, with a 27th place in Pozza di Fassa. Two twentieth places followed before the end of the season. The 2004–05 season was more mediocre, but the 2005–06 season was opened with a thirteenth place in Les Contamines. The 2006–07 World Cup run consisted of a tenth place in Flaine and a seventh place in Les Contamines; he also finished sixth at the 2007 World Championships in Madonna di Campiglio. In 2007–08 he finished ninth in Kreischberg and Grindelwald, before taking his first podium with a third place in Valmalenco in March. In his next World Cup events, in January 2009, he finished second in St. Johann in Tirol and won in Les Contamines.

Matt went on to win the skicross gold medal at the FIS Freestyle World Ski Championships 2009 in Inawashiro, the silver medal at the 2010 Winter Olympics in Vancouver and the bronze at the 2011 World Championships in Deer Valley. In World Cup competition he took a total of seven wins and was World Cup champion for the 2010–11 season.

Matt represented the sports club SC Flirsch.

In September 2016 he announced his retirement from competition at the age of 33.

== See also ==
- List of Olympic medalist families
