= Didrik Bastian Juell =

Norwegian freestyle skier

Personal information
- Nationality: Norwegian
- Born: 22 February 1990 (age 35); Oslo, Norway

Sport
- Sport: Freestyle skiing
- Club: Ready IL

Didrik Bastian Juell (born 22 February 1990) is a Norwegian freestyle skier. He was born in Oslo. He competed at the 2014 Winter Olympics in Sochi, in ski-cross, reaching the quarter finals.
