= Jonas Devouassoux =

French freestyle skier (born 1989)

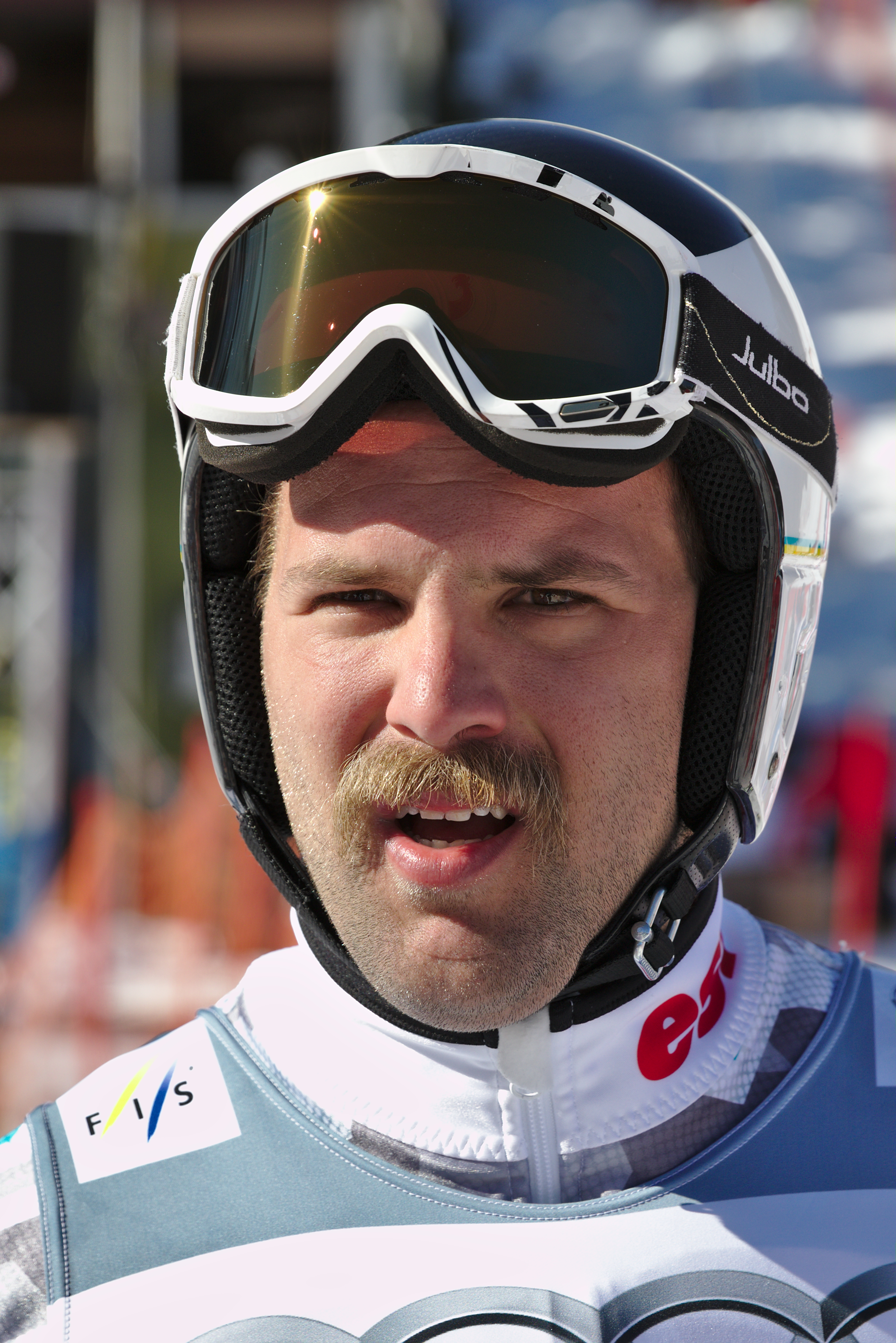

Personal information
- Nationality: French
- Born: 23 October 1989 (age 36) Chamonix

Sport
- Sport: Freestyle skiing

Jonas Devouassoux (born 23 October 1989) is a French freestyle skier.

== Biography ==
Devouassoux was born in Chamonix on 23 October 1989. He competed in ski cross at the World Ski Championships 2011, and at the 2014 Winter Olympics in Sochi, in ski-cross.

His FIS Freestyle Ski World Cup achievements include one victory in ski cross (in the 2013/14 season).
