= Christopher Del Bosco =

American-born, Canadian freestyle skier

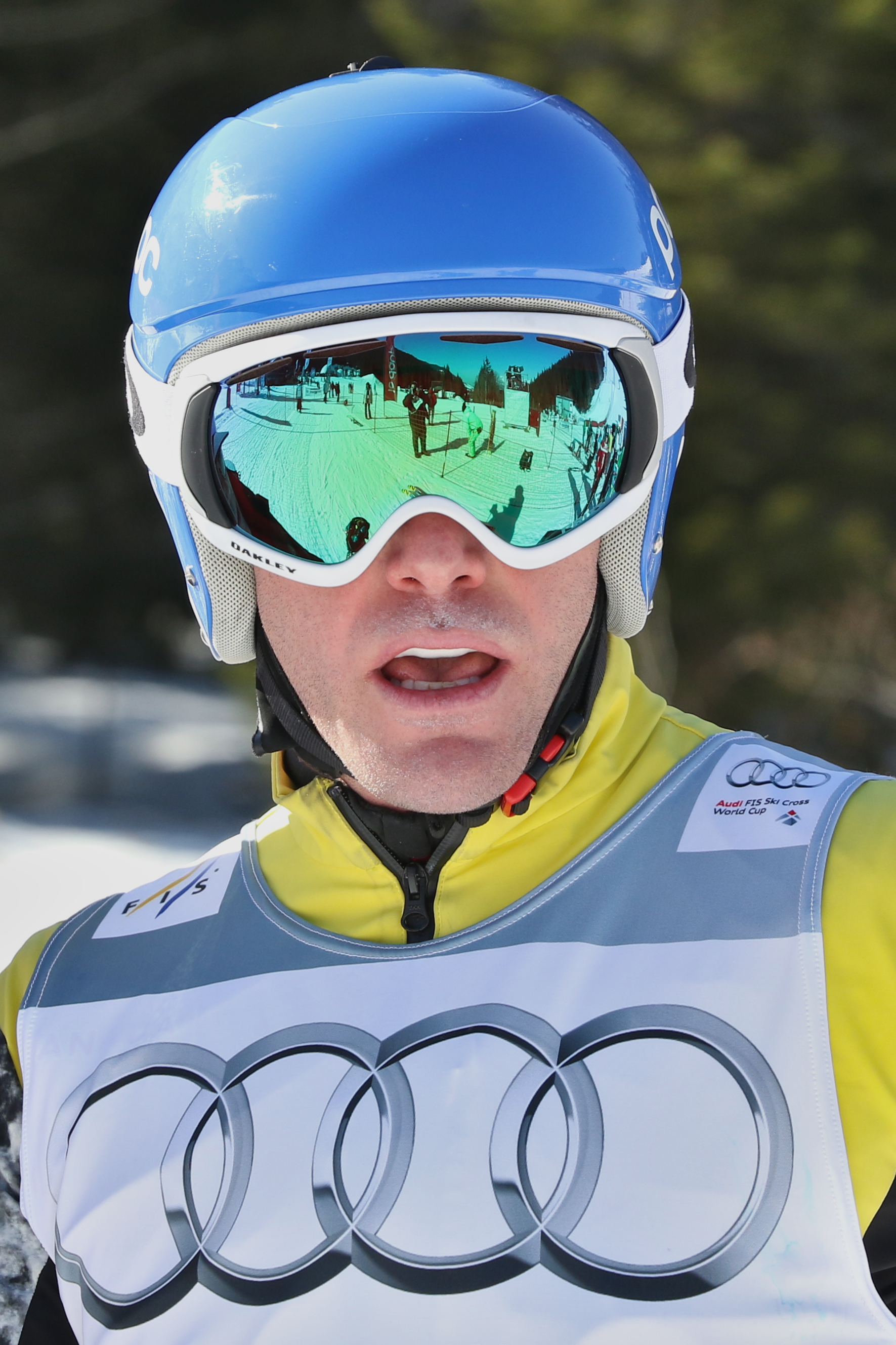
- Del Bosco in 2015

Personal information
- Born: March 30, 1982 (age 44) Colorado Springs, Colorado
- Height: 1.85 m (6 ft 1 in)
- Weight: 210 lb (95 kg)
- Website: chrisdelbosco.com

Sport
- Country: Canada
- Sport: Ski cross
Medal record
Representing Canada
Men's Freestyle skiing
World Championships
| Gold medal – first place | 2011 Deer Valley | Ski cross |
Winter X Games
| Gold medal – first place | 2010 Aspen | Ski cross |
| Gold medal – first place | 2012 Aspen | Ski cross |
| Silver medal – second place | 2011 Aspen | Ski cross |
| Bronze medal – third place | 2006 Aspen | Ski cross |
| Bronze medal – third place | 2016 Aspen | Ski cross |

Christopher Del Bosco (born March 30, 1982), is an American-born, Canadian freestyle skier who currently resides in Montreal, Quebec, Canada. Del Bosco is a member of the Canadian national ski cross team. He is a former FIS World Champion and X Games champion in ski cross and has four other medals from the X Games including one gold, one silver, and two bronze. Del Bosco was a United States national champion prior to switching to the Canadian team.

== Career ==
Del Bosco was born in Colorado Springs, Colorado but was raised in Vail, Colorado. Prior to joining the Canadian freestyle ski team, he had problems with substance and alcohol abuse that had led to him being stripped of two US national titles, and at age 21 was discovered drunk in a ditch with a broken neck. His sister, Heather, convinced him to go into rehab. This saved him from going to jail for another year. After this he received an offer from the Canadian ski team who had heard about Del Bosco and his Canadian passport, as Del Bosco's father was Canadian. Del Bosco was offered a spot on the team despite the character risks he carried with him and Del Bosco then agreed to join the Canadians.

He went on from there and built on his success with the Canadian ski team. In 2006 at the Winter X-Games he won a bronze medal in the ski-cross event. During the 2009–10 Freestyle Skiing World Cup he won two world cup events, one on the Alpe d'Huez and in Lake Placid. Del Bosco ended the season second overall on the World Cup rankings.

At the 2010 Winter X Games Del Bosco attended as a warm up to the Olympics. There he won gold in the ski cross final, leading a Canadian sweep of the medals with Dave Duncan and Brady Leman. This was the first time that the medals have been swept in a round other than by US athletes.

Del Bosco was a member of the Canadian team going to the 2010 Winter Olympics in Vancouver. He made the men's ski cross final, and was in strong position to win a bronze medal, but fell shortly before the finish line while trying to make a pass. After the race at a press conference Del Bosco had said that "Third, I guess it's all right for some people, but I wanted to give 100% for my sport, my country."

After his disappointing Olympics Del Bosco had surgery in May 2010. During the next season he achieved success at the Winter X Games when he won the silver medal in ski cross. Del Bosco then went on to the 2011 World Championships where he won his first World Championship. Del Bosco said of his victory that "This is a really special title to have, you only get the chance once every two years. I had some tough luck at the last world championships in Japan and then (last year's) Olympics, I was fourth in both of those events. I was kind of starting to wonder about these big events and I guess the third time is the charm. I managed to get it done this time."

The next season brought a continued gold rush for Del Bosco, with his third gold medal at a major competition in as many years. He went on to win the gold at the XVI Winter X Games finishing in first while teammate Duncan finished in third. Del Bosco was proud of his victory despite a world cup season with limited success, "It's amazing, this is my favourite event," said Del Bosco in a statement. "I have had an up and down season and this one was the big one on my list. So to come in and grab gold is pretty special."

== Personal life ==
Del Bosco moved to Montreal in the spring of 2011. He also started competing in a second sport, downhill mountain biking.

Del Bosco began drinking alcohol and smoking marijuana regularly as a teenager. In December 2004, he blacked out in a creek bed after a drinking binge, breaking his neck. He survived because a stranger happened to see him. Del Bosco quit drinking in September 2006.
