= Jonathan Midol =

French freestyle skier

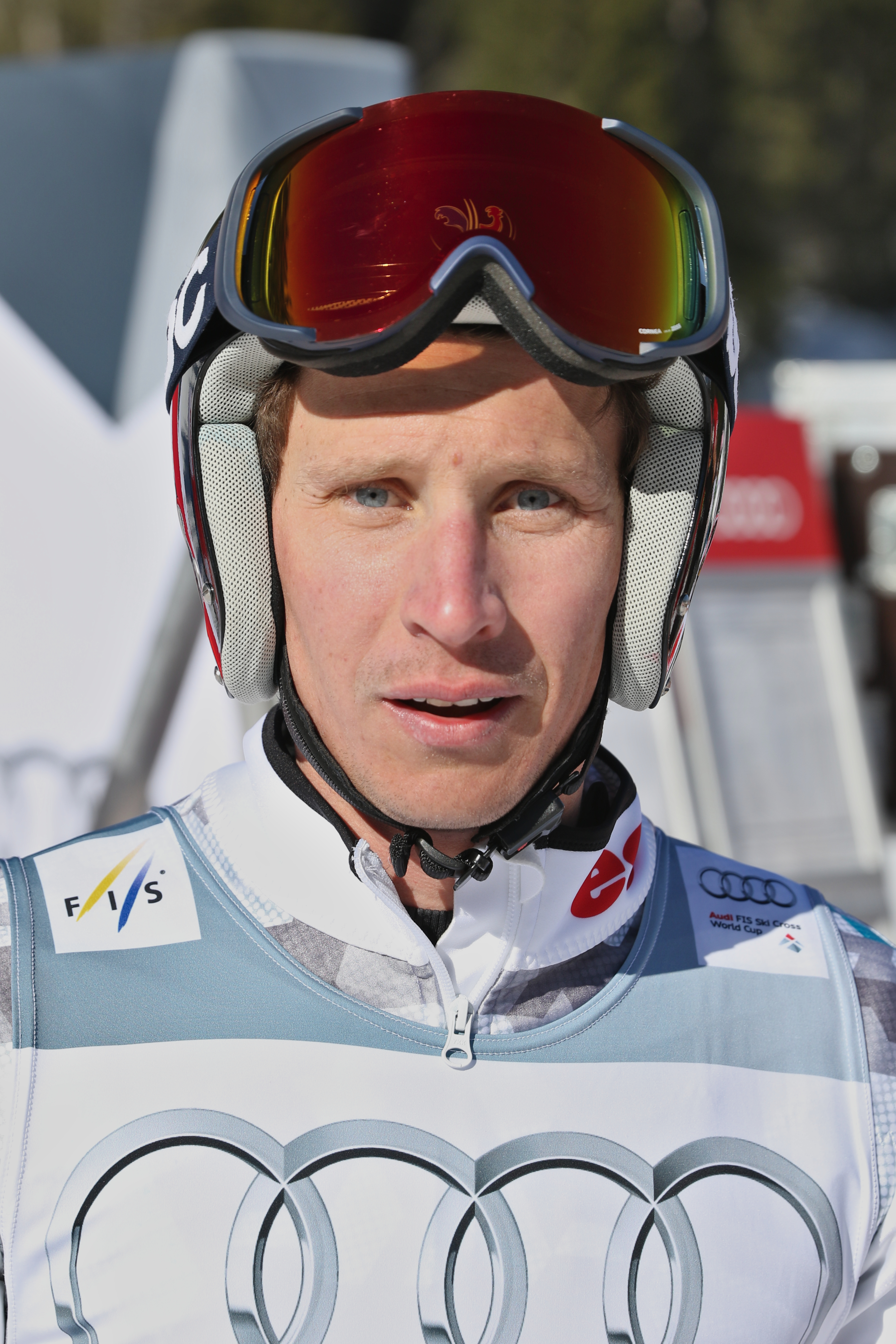

Personal information
- Born: 13 January 1988 (age 38) Annecy, France

Sport
- Country: France
Medal record
Men's freestyle skiing
Representing France
Olympic Games
Bronze medal – third place	2014 Sochi	Ski cross

Jonathan Midol (born 13 January 1988) is a French freestyle skier and Olympic medalist. He was born in Annecy. He competed in ski cross at the World Ski Championships 2013, and at the 2014 Winter Olympics in Sochi, where he earned a bronze medal in ski-cross. His brother is also a medallist skier, Bastien Midol.
