= Thomas Zangerl =

Austrian freestyle skier

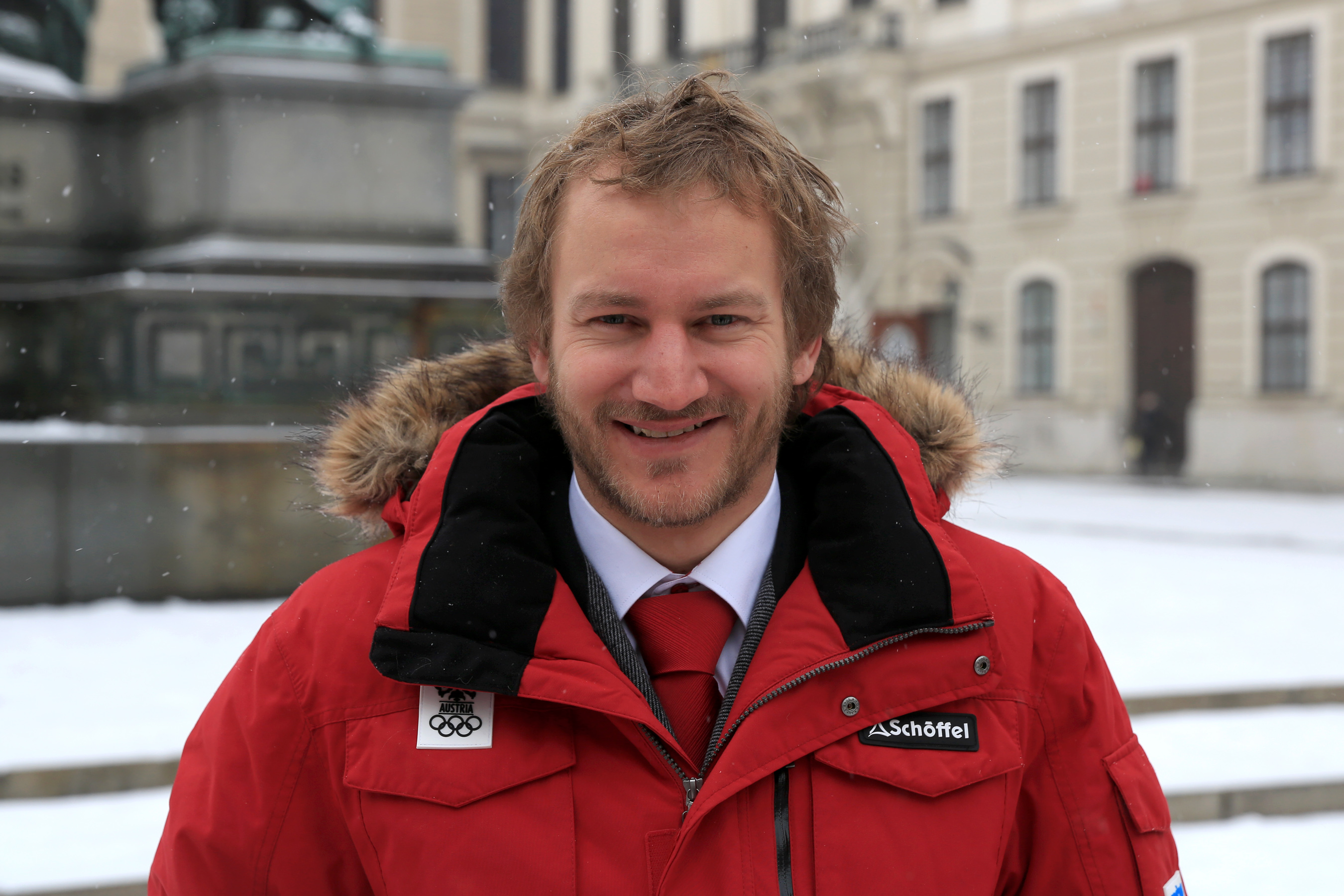
- Zangerl in 2014

Medal record

Men's freestyle skiing

Representing Austria

FIS Freestyle World Ski Championships
Silver medal – second place	2009 Inawashiro	Ski cross

Thomas Zangerl (born 10 June 1983 in Kufstein) is an Austrian freestyle skier who specializes in the ski cross discipline.

He made his World Cup debut in March 2003 in Les Contamines, but was disqualified. His first valid World Cup result was a thirteenth place in Saas-Fee in November the same year. He proceeded to perform consistently in the range of 20th–30th, except for an eight place in Naeba in February. Then, until 2007 he only raced once in the World Cup, with a ninth place in Kreischberg in January 2006. The 2006–07 and 2007–08 seasons were mediocre, but in January 2009 he finished fourth in two races.

He represents the sports club WSV Walchsee.
