= Egor Korotkov =

Russian freestyle skier

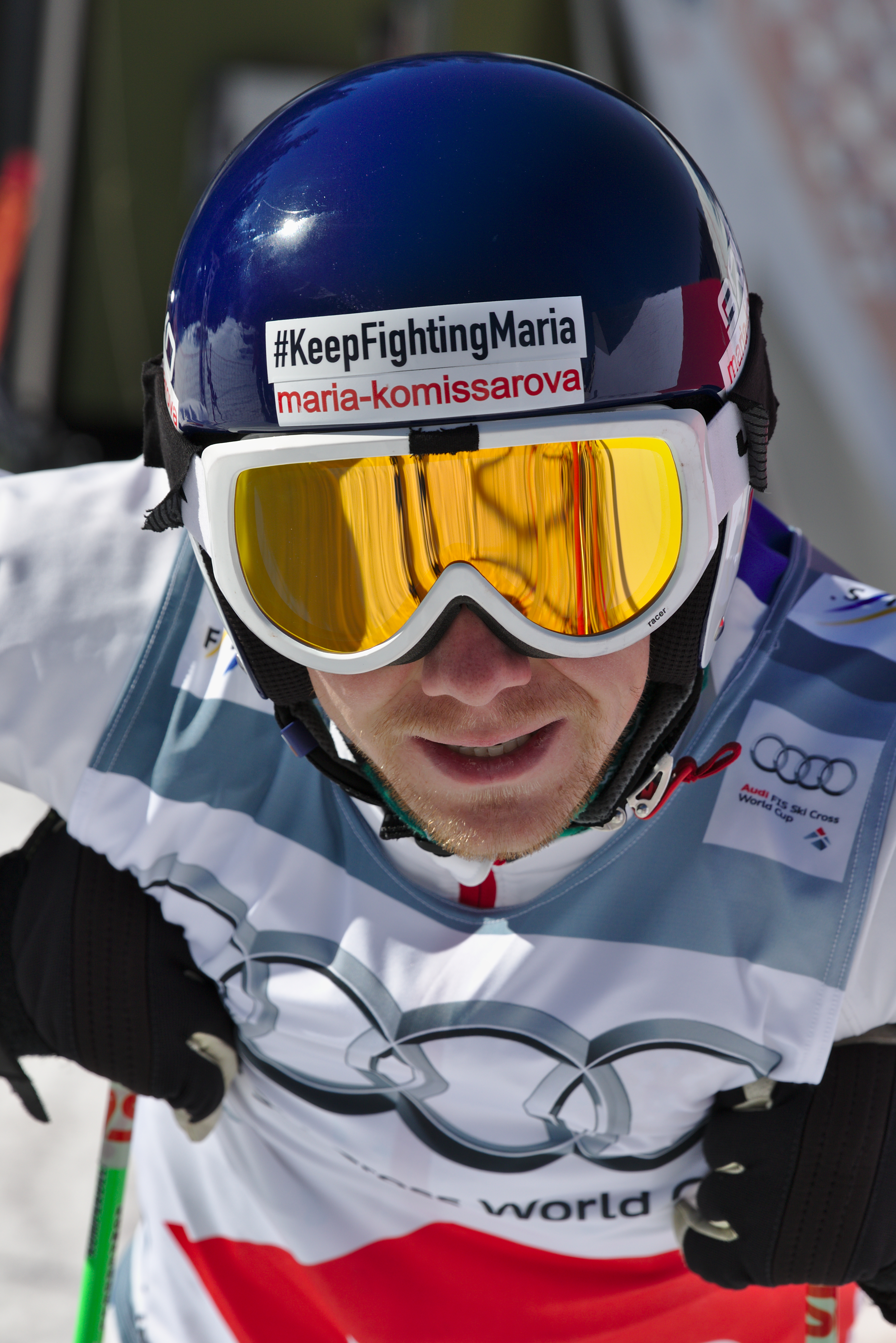
- Egor Korotkov, FIS Ski Cross World Cup 2015

Personal information
- Full name: Egor Vadimovich Korotkov
- Nationality: Russia
- Born: 14 April 1986 (age 40) Tryokhgorny, Chelyabinsk Oblast, RSFSR, USSR (now Russia)
- Height: 1.80 m (5 ft 11 in)

Sport
- Sport: Skiing
Medal record
Men's Freestyle skiing
Representing Russia
Olympic Games

Egor Vadimovich Korotkov (Russian: Его́р Вади́мович Коротко́в; born 14 April 1986) is a Russian freestyle skier who specializes in the skicross discipline.

== Career ==
He finished fifth at the 2006 FIS Nordic Junior World Ski Championships, and participated in the 2007 World Championships before competing in the World Cup. He made his World Cup debut in January 2008 with a fifteenth place in Les Contamines, and followed up with an eleventh place in Kreischberg and a thirteenth place in Valmalenco before the season was over. He opened the 2008–09 season with slightly worse results.

He also competed in the 2010 Winter Olympics on the Russian ski team in ski cross.

Russian Champion (2009-2011, 2013). Bronze Medal at the Russian Championship (2012). Austrian Champion (2013). The best result is the tenth place in the General Ski cross Championship in 2011/2012.

In ski cross at the Sochi Olympics, he took the 5th place. In the semi-final of the ski cross tournament he managed to pass through the video and photos from the finishing line.
