= Jouni Pellinen =

Finnish skier (born 1983)

Medal record

Men's Freestyle skiing

Representing Finland

FIS Freestyle World Ski Championships
Silver medal – second place	2011 Deer Valley	Ski cross

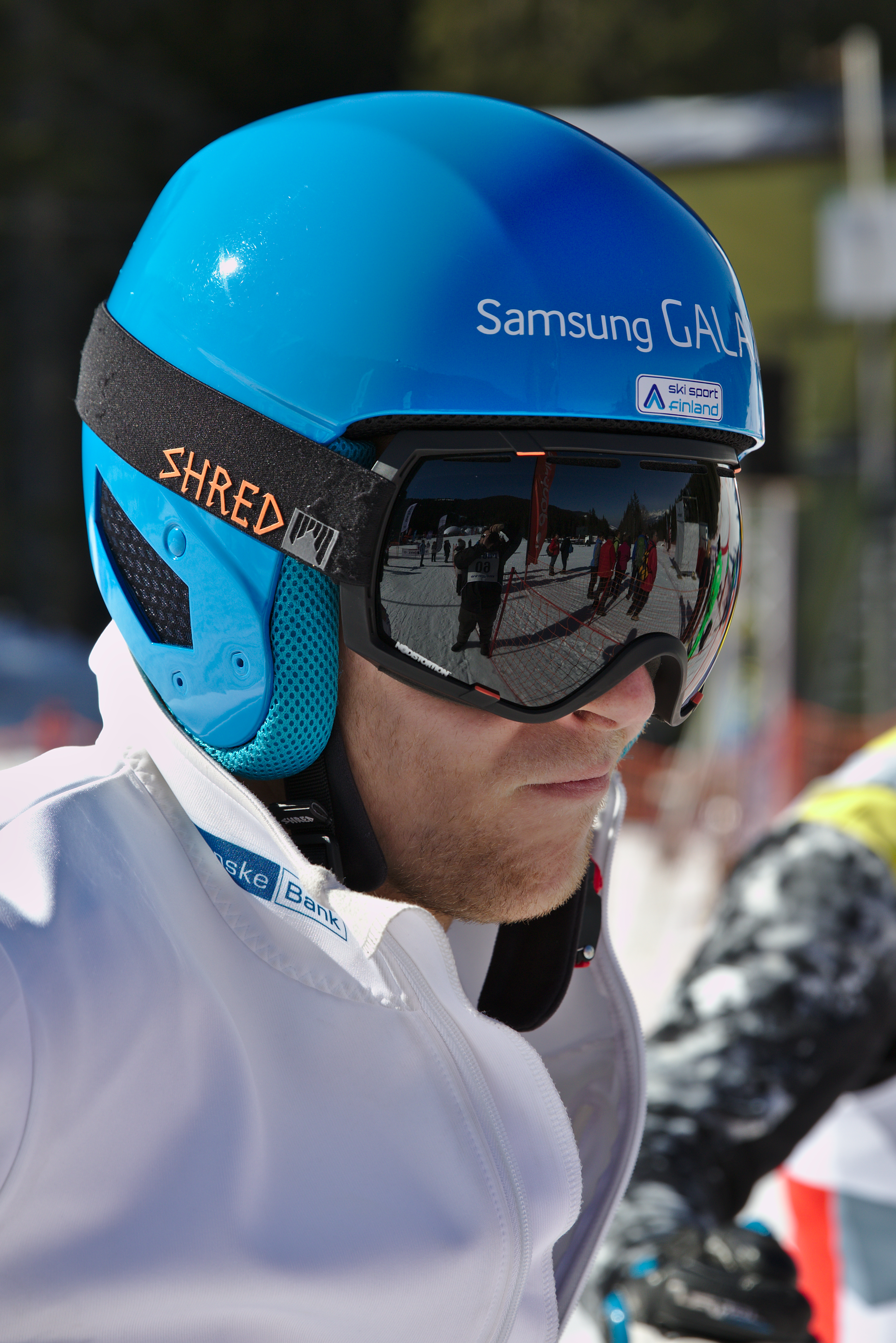
Jouni Pellinen

Jouni Pellinen (born 11 May 1983) is a Finnish freestyle skier who specializes in the skicross discipline. He is a former alpine skier.

He made his World Cup debut in December 2005 in Kranjska Gora, and collected his first World Cup points in December 2006, with a 28th place in Super-G in Hinterstoder. He also competed at the 2007 World Championships.

In freestyle skiing he made his World Cup debut in January 2009 in St. Johann in Tirol, and collected his first World Cup points the same month, with a 5th place in Flaine and a twelfth place in Lake Placid.

He represents the sports club "Imatran Urheilijat".

Pellinen retired from competition before the 2015–16 World Cup season.
