= Armin Niederer =

Swiss freestyle skier

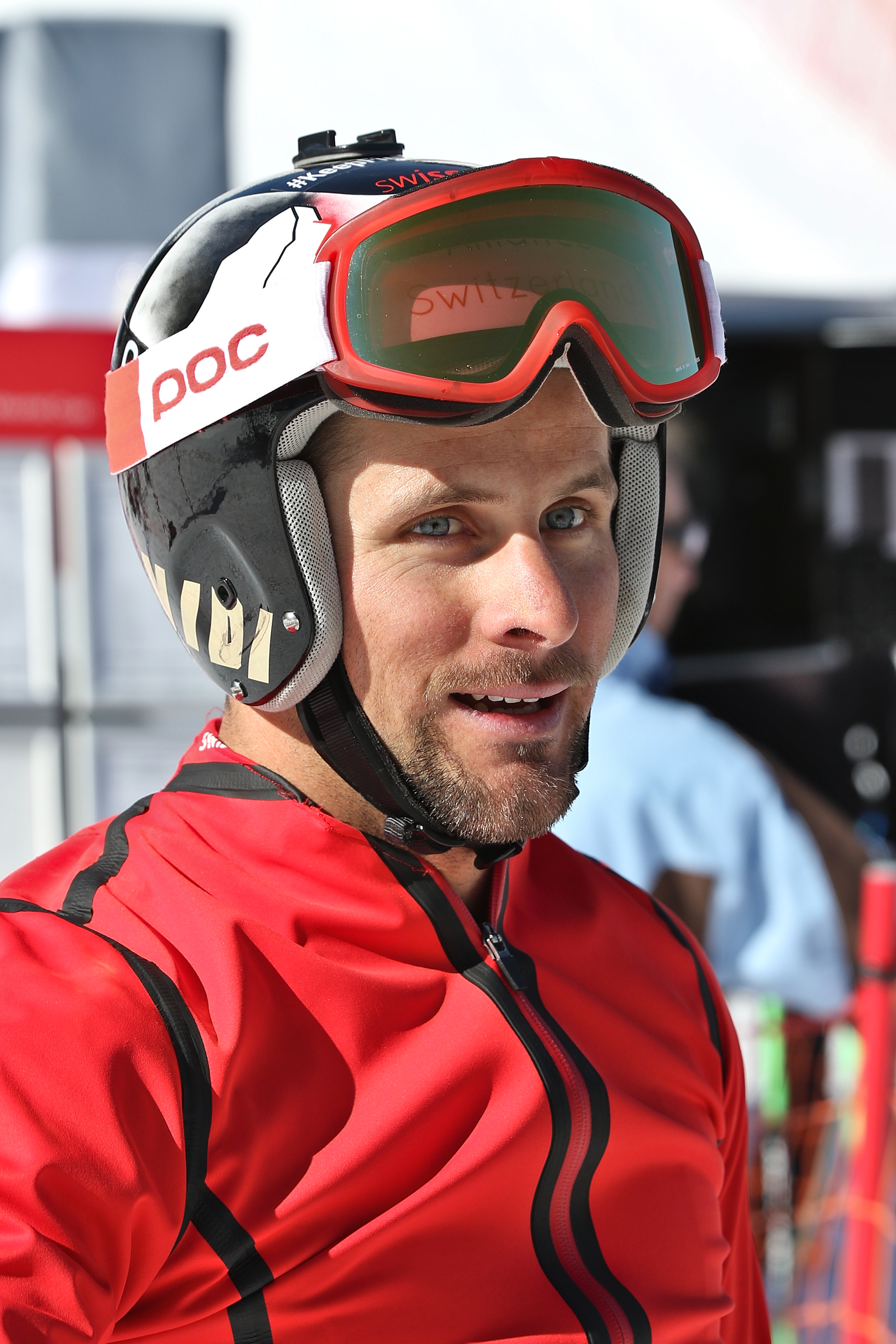
Armin Niederer

Armin Niederer (born 28 February 1987) is a Swiss freestyle skier who specializes in the skicross discipline.

He made his World Cup debut in January 2007 in Flaine, with a 27th place. He then won a bronze medal at the 2007 Junior World Championships. He finished among the top twenty for the first time in February 2008, with an eighteenth place in Sierra Nevada. In the 2008–09 season he finished among the top twenty in three of his first four races, with the best result being an eleventh place in Lake Placid in January.

He uses Fischer Skis.
