= Jean-Frédéric Chapuis =

French freestyle skier

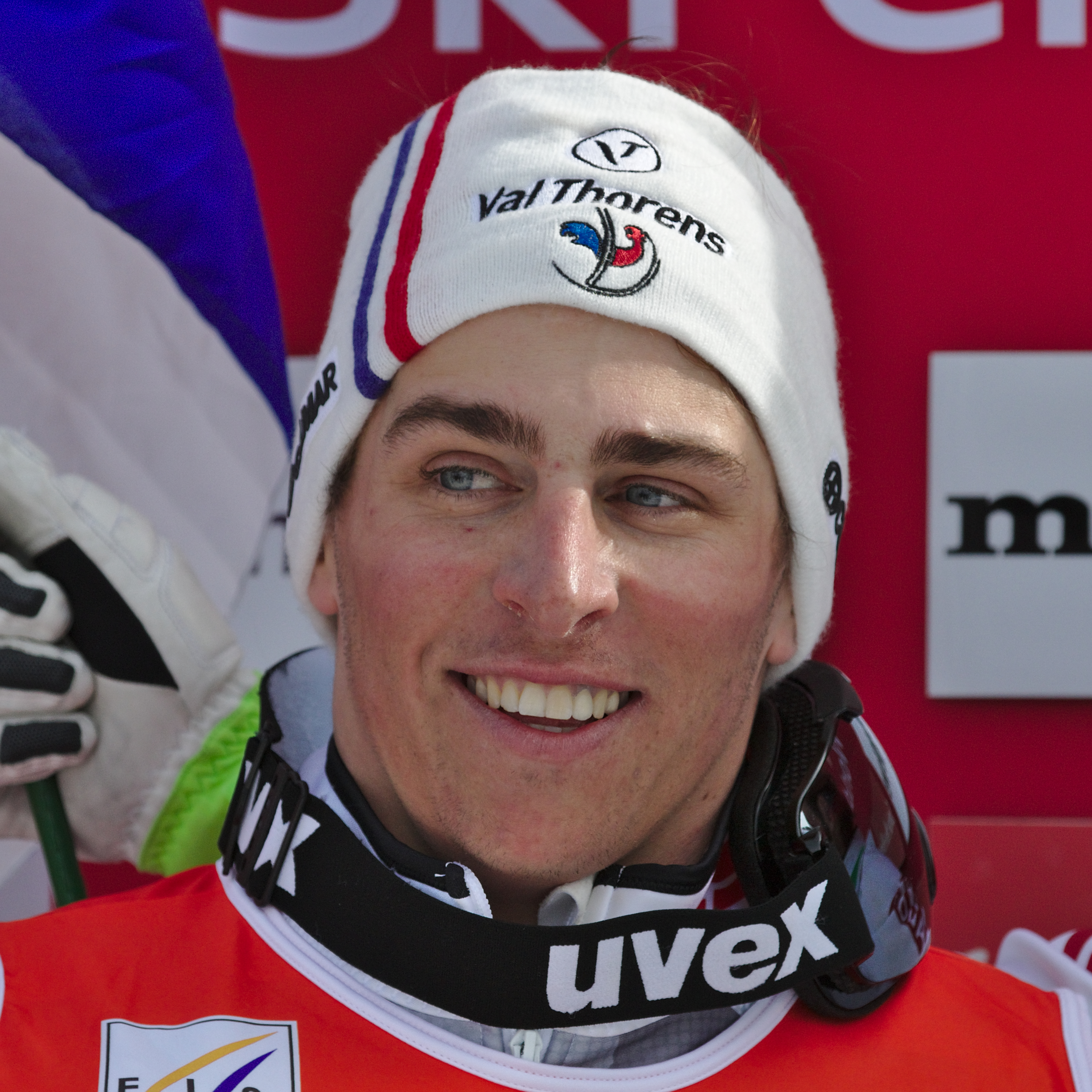
- Chapuis in 2015

Personal information
- Born: 2 March 1989 (age 37) Bourg-Saint-Maurice, France

Sport
- Country: France
Medal record
Men's Freestyle skiing
Representing France
Olympic Games
Gold medal – first place	2014 Sochi	Ski cross
World Championships
Gold medal – first place	2013 Voss	Ski cross
Silver medal – second place	2015 Kreischberg	Ski cross

Jean-Frédéric Chapuis (born 2 March 1989) is a French freestyle skier. He won the gold medal at the 2013 FIS Freestyle World Ski Championships in ski cross. He repeated his success in the 2014 Winter Olympic Games with a gold medal.
