= Pyotr Popov =

Russian luger (born 1985)

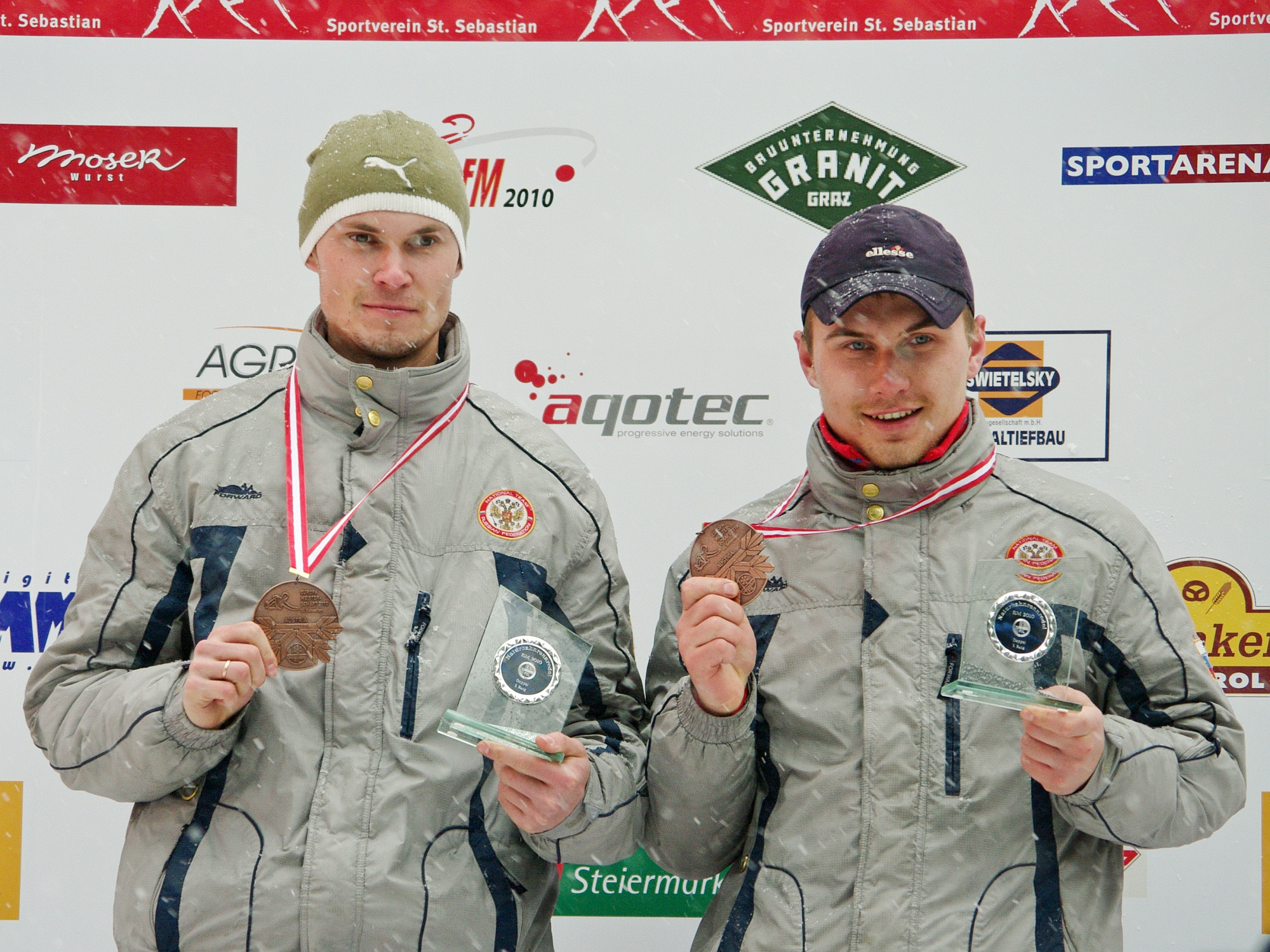
- Pyotr Popov (right) and Aleksandr Yegorov in January 2010

Medal record

Natural track luge

World Championships
Silver medal – second place	2007 Grande Prairie	Men's doubles

European Championships
Bronze medal – third place	2008 Olang	Men's doubles
Bronze medal – third place	2010 St. Sebastian	Men's doubles

Pyotr Popov (Russian: Пётр Попо́в, born 4 September 1985) is a Russian luger who has competed since 2002. A natural track luger, he won the silver medal in the men's doubles event at the 2007 FIL World Luge Natural Track Championships in Grande Prairie, Alberta, Canada.

Popov also won two bronzes in the men's doubles event at the FIL European Luge Natural Track Championships, earning them in 2008 and 2010.
