= Imelda Gruber =

Italian luger

Medal record

Natural track luge

Representing Italy

European Championships
Silver medal – second place	2006 Umhausen	Women's singles

Imelda Gruber (born 11 August 1986) is an Italian luger who has competed since the mid-2000s. A natural track luger, she won the silver medal in the women's singles event at the 2006 FIL European Luge Natural Track Championships in Umhausen, Austria.
