= Thomas Schopf =

Austrian luger (born 1989)

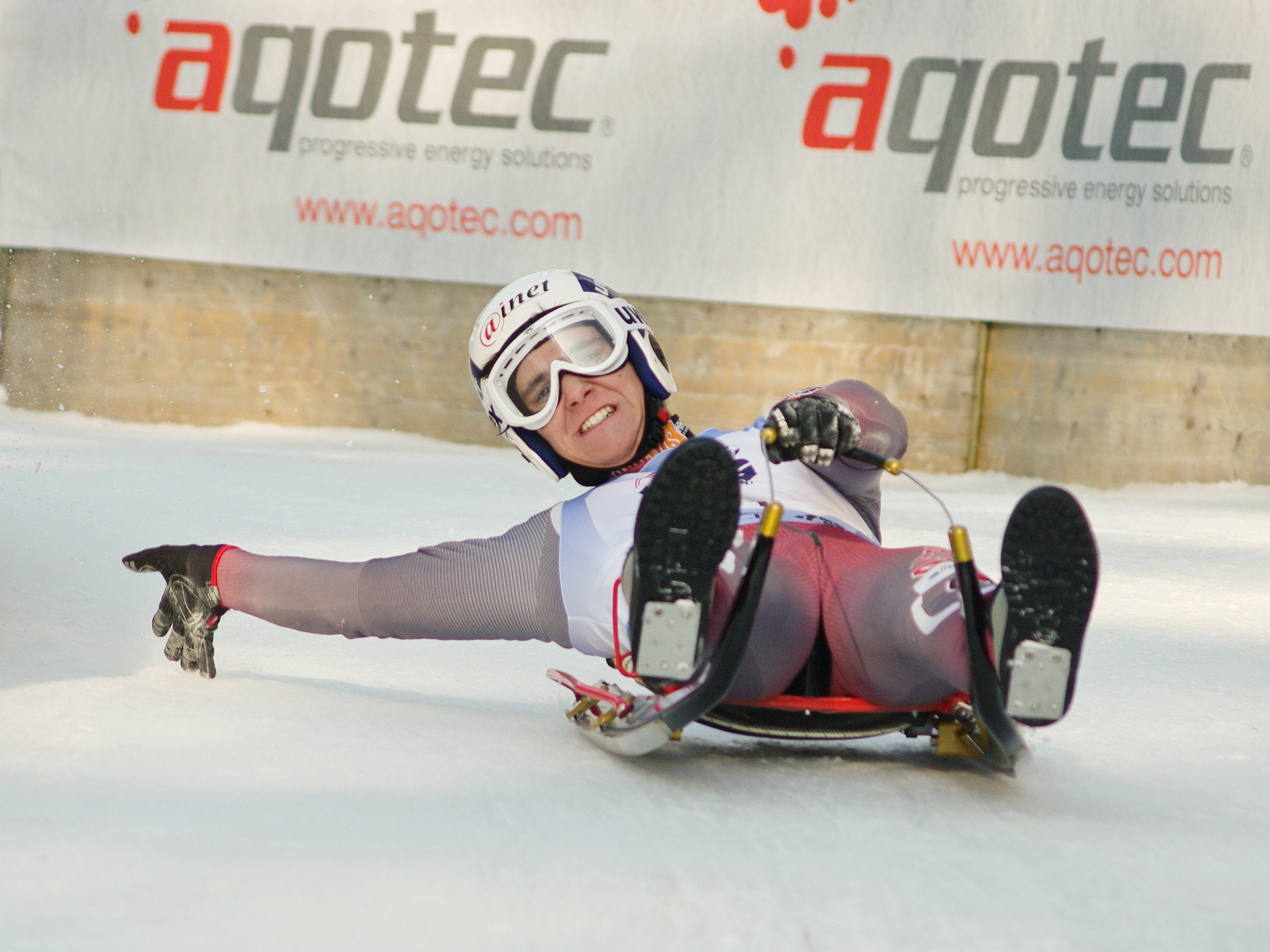
- Schopf in 2010

Personal information
- Born: 3 November 1989 (age 36)
Medal record
Natural track luge
Representing Austria
World Championships
Silver medal – second place	2009 Moos	Mixed team
Bronze medal – third place	2009 Moos	Men's singles
European Championships
Silver medal – second place	2006 Umhausen	Men's singles

Thomas Schopf (born 3 November 1989) is an Austrian luger who has competed since the early 2000s. A natural track luger, he won two medals at the 2009 FIL World Luge Natural Track Championships in Moos, Italy with a silver in mixed team and a bronze in the men's singles events.

Schopf also won a silver medal in the men's singles event at the 2006 FIL European Luge Natural Track Championships in Umhausen, Austria.
