= Fernerkogel =

Fernerkogel is the name of several mountain in the Austrian state of Tyrol:

- Lüsener Fernerkogel (also Lisenser Fernerkogl) in the Stubai Alps, 3,298 m above sea level (AA)
- Rechter Fernerkogel in the Ötztal Alps, 3,298 m above sea level (AA)
- Linker Fernerkogel in the Ötztal Alps, 3,277 m above sea level (AA)
- Gleirscher Fernerkogel in the Stubai Alps 3,194 m above sea level (AA)
