= Rosskarspitze =

Rosskarspitze or Roßkarspitze may refer to:

- Gleirscher Fernerkogel (3,194 m), a mountain in the Stubai Alps in Austria, formerly called the Rosskarspitzewurde
- Col dell'Ai (2,511 m), a mountain on the East Tyrolean-Italian border
- Westliche Rosskarspitze (2292 m) and Östliche Rosskarspitze (2291 m), a twin-peaked mountain in the Allgäu Alps, also known as the Rosskarspitze
