= FIL European Luge Natural Track Championships 2006 =

The FIL European Luge Natural Track Championships 2006 took place in Umhausen, Austria.

== Men's singles ==
Medal	Athlete	Time
Gold	Gernot Schwab (AUT)	
Silver	Thomas Schopf (AUT)	
Bronze	Patrick Pigneter (ITA)	

== Women's singles ==
Medal	Athlete	Time
Gold	Christa Gietl (ITA)	
Silver	Imelda Gruber (ITA)	
Bronze	Renate Gietl (ITA)	

== Men's doubles ==
Medal	Athlete	Time
Gold	Russia (Pavel Porzhnev, Ivan Lazarev)	
Silver	Austria (Christian Schatz, Gerhard Mühlbacher)	
Bronze	Russia (Denis Alimov, Roman Molvistov)	

== Medal table ==
Rank	Nation	Gold	Silver	Bronze	Total
1	Austria (AUT)	1	2	0	3
2	Italy (ITA)	1	1	2	4
3	Russia (RUS)	1	0	1	2
Totals (3 entries)		3	3	3	9
