= Gernot Schwab =

Austrian luger (born 1979)

Medal record

Natural track luge

Representing Austria

World Championships
Gold medal – first place	2007 Grande Prairie	Men's singles
Gold medal – first place	2007 Grande Prairie	Mixed team

European Championships
Gold medal – first place	2006 Umhausen	Men's singles
Bronze medal – third place	2002 Frantschach	Men's singles

Gernot Schwab (born 10 January 1979) is an Austrian luger who has competed since 1999. A natural track luger, he won two gold medals at the 2007 FIL World Luge Natural Track Championships in the men's singles and mixed team events.

Schwab also won two medals at the FIL European Luge Natural Track Championships in the men's singles event with a gold in 2006 and a bronze in 2002.
