= Yuliya Vetlova =

Russian luger (born 1983)

Medal record

Natural track luge

Representing Russia

World Championships
Silver medal – second place	2007 Grande Prairie	Women's singles

Yuliya Anatolyevna Vetlova (Russian: Юлия Анатольевна Ветлова, born October 18, 1983, in Kandalaksha) is a Russian luger who has competed since 1999. A natural track luger, she won the silver medal in the women's singles event at the 2007 FIL World Luge Natural Track Championships in Grande Prairie, Alberta, Canada.
