= Robert Batkowski =

Austrian luger (born 1978)

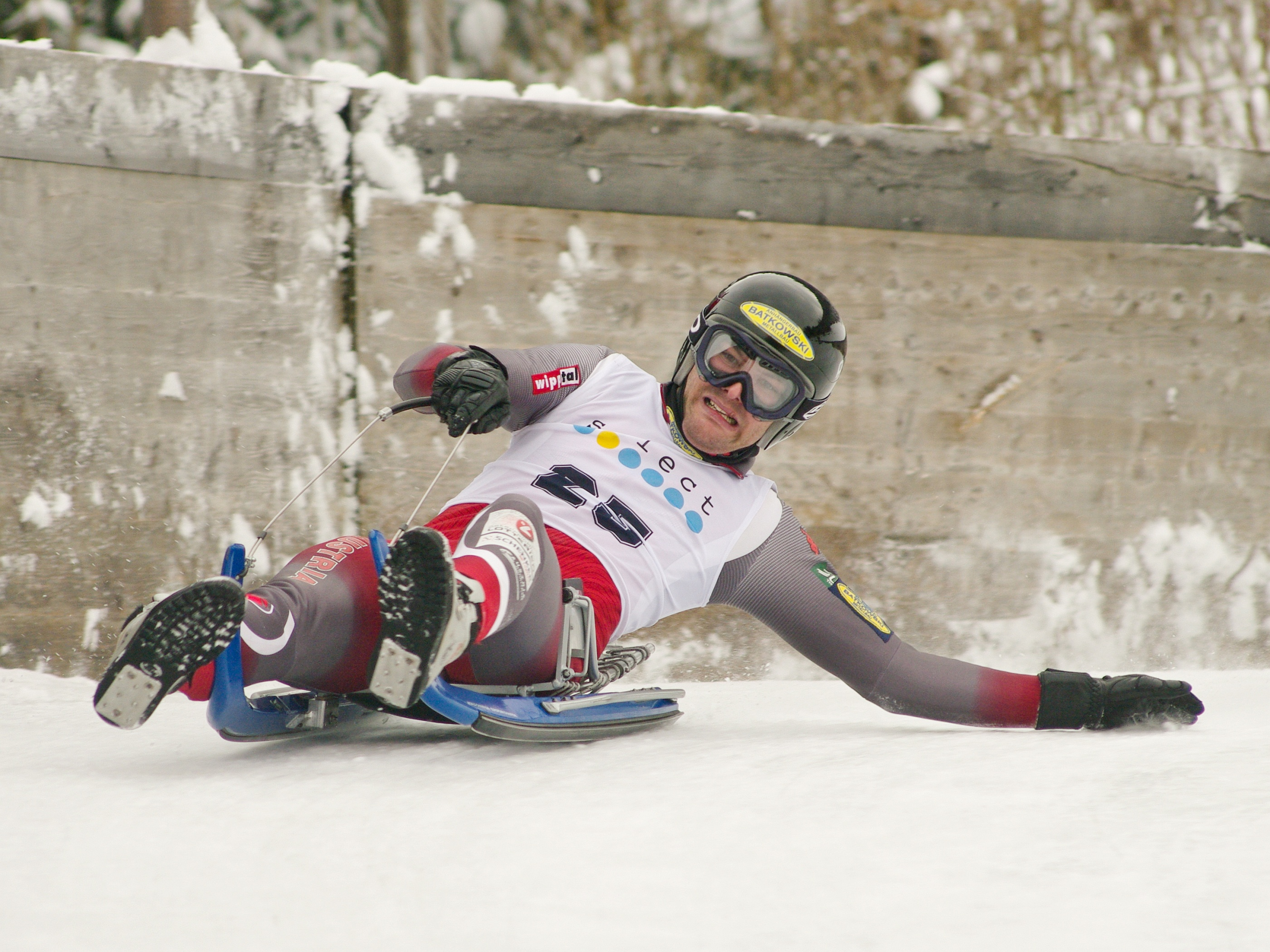
- Batkowski in 2010

Medal record

Natural track luge

Representing Austria

World Championships
Gold medal – first place	2003 Železniki	Men's singles
Gold medal – first place	2005 Latsch	Mixed team
Silver medal – second place	2011 Umhausen	Men's singles

European Championships
Gold medal – first place	2008 Olang	Men's singles
Silver medal – second place	1999 Szczyrk	Men's singles
Silver medal – second place	2002 Frantschach	Men's singles

Robert Batkowski (born 16 May 1978) is an Austrian luger who has competed since 1998. A natural track luger, he won three medals at the FIL World Luge Natural Track Championships with two golds (Men's singles: 2003, Mixed team: 2005) and one silver (Men's singles: 2011).

Batkowski earned three medals in the men's single events at the FIL European Luge Natural Track Championships with one gold (2008) and two silvers (1999, 2002).
