= Ivan Lazarev (luger) =

Russian luger (born 1983)

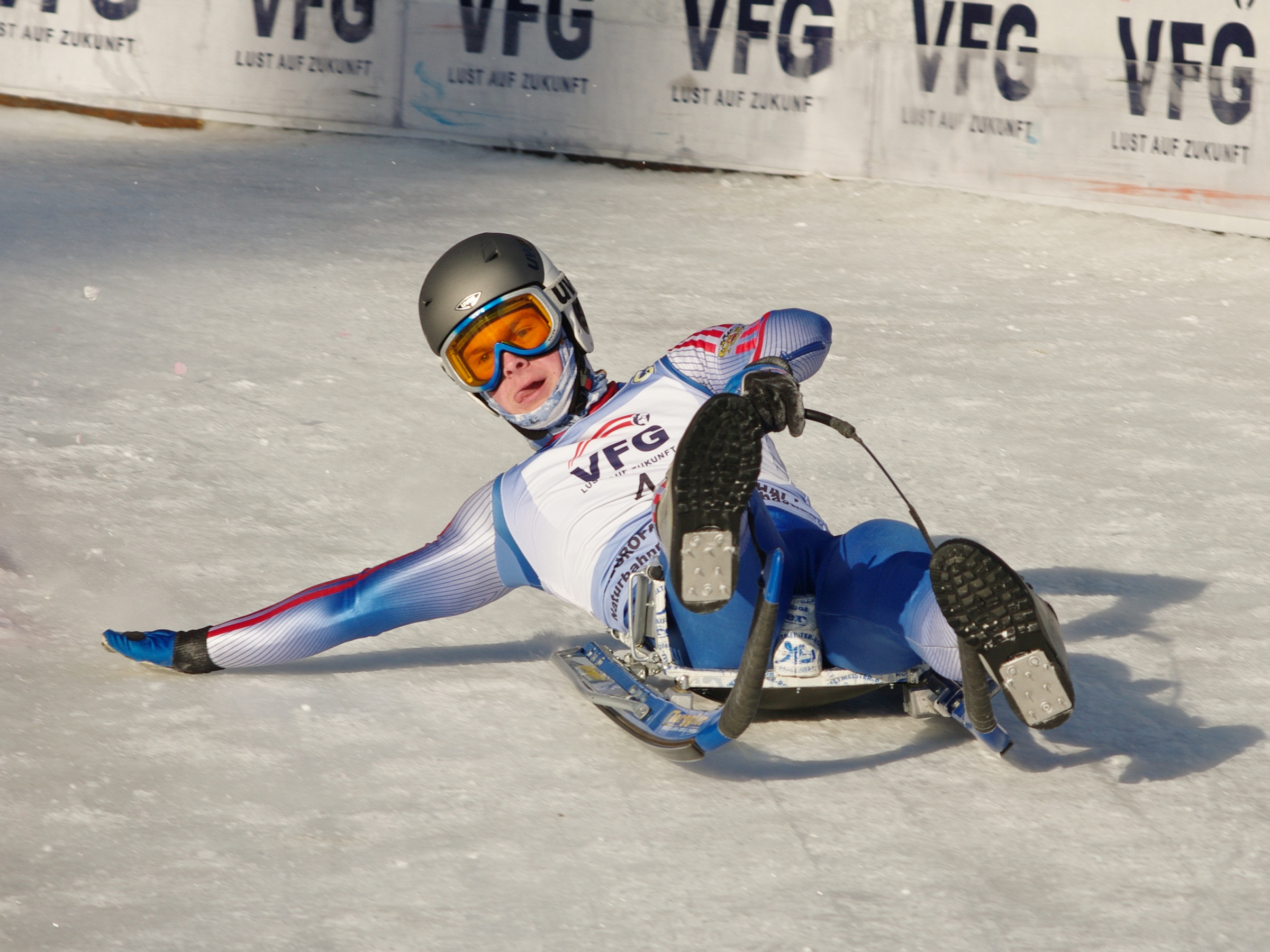
- Lazarev at 2010 European Championships

Medal record

Natural track luge

Representing Russia

World Championships
Gold medal – first place	2005 Latsch	Men's doubles
Gold medal – first place	2007 Grande Prairie	Men's doubles
Gold medal – first place	2011 Umhausen	Men's doubles
Silver medal – second place	2003 Železniki	Men's doubles
Silver medal – second place	2005 Latsch	Mixed team
Bronze medal – third place	2009 Moos	Mixed team
Bronze medal – third place	2011 Umhausen	Mixed team

European Championships
Gold medal – first place	2004 Hüttau	Men's doubles
Gold medal – first place	2006 Umhausen	Men's doubles
Gold medal – first place	2008 Olang	Men's doubles

Ivan Lazarev (born 4 November 1983) is a Russian luger who has competed since 1998. A natural track luger, he won seven medals at the FIL World Luge Natural Track Championships with a three golds (Men's doubles: 2005, 2007, 2011), two silvers (Men's doubles: 2003, Mixed team: 2005), and two bronzes (Mixed team: 2009, 2011).

Lazarev also won three gold medals in the men's doubles event at the FIL European Luge Natural Track Championships (2004, 2006, 2008).
