= Christian Schatz =

Austrian luger (born 1975)

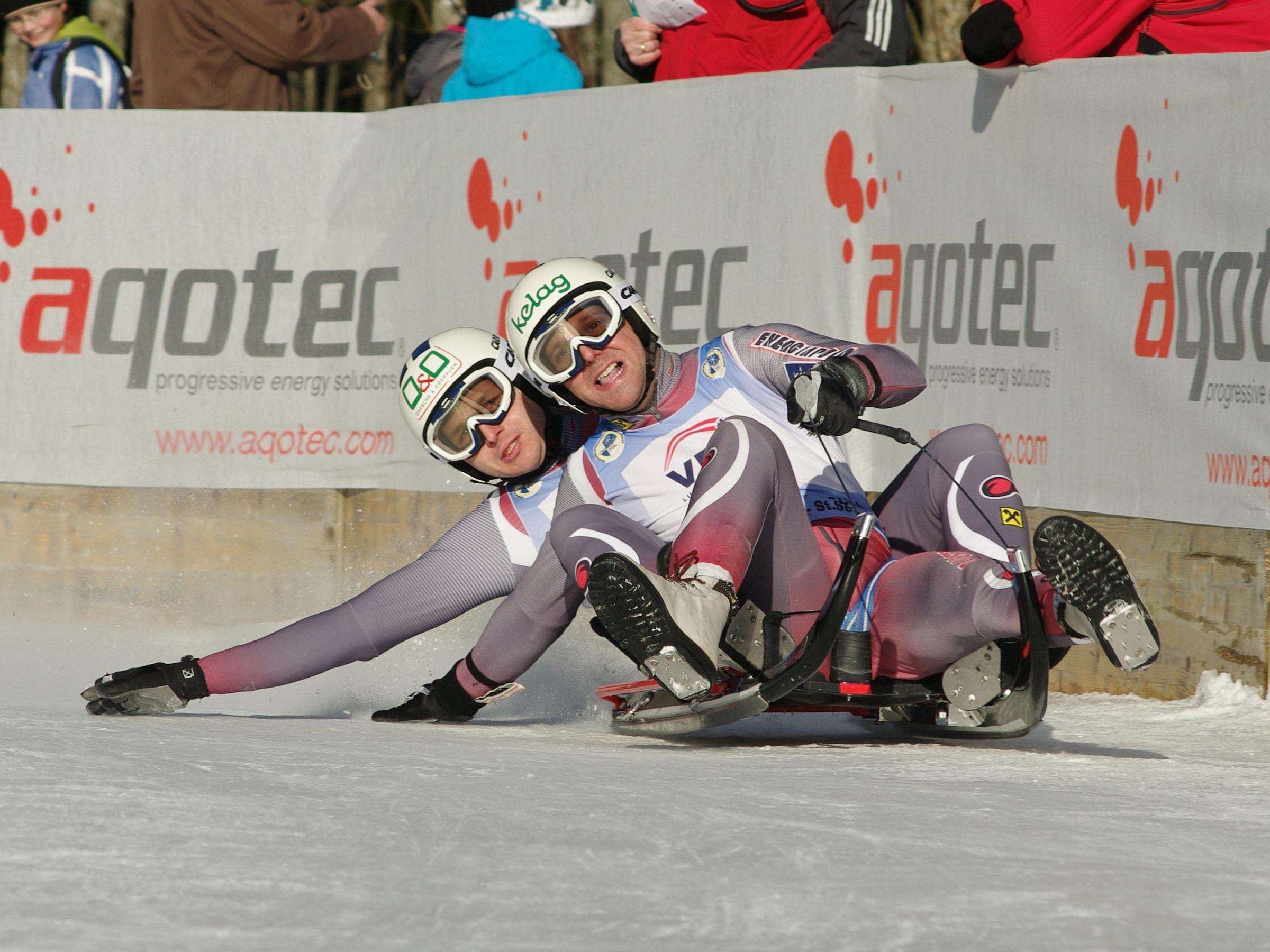
- Christian Schatz and Gerhard Mühlbacher

Medal record

Natural track luge

Representing Austria

World Championships
Gold medal – first place	2007 Grande Prairie	Mixed team
Silver medal – second place	2011 Umhausen	Mixed team
Bronze medal – third place	2007 Grande Prairie	Men's doubles

European Championships
Silver medal – second place	2006 Umhausen	Men's doubles
Bronze medal – third place	2010 St. Sebastian	Mixed team

Christian Schatz (born 7 October 1975) is an Austrian luger who has competed since 2000. A natural track luger, he won a complete set of medals at the FIL World Luge Natural Track Championships with a gold (Mixed team: 2007), a silver (Mixed team: 2011, and a bronze (Men's doubles: 2007).

Schatz also earned two medals at the FIL European Luge Championships with a silver (men's doubles: 2006) and a bronze (mixed team: 2010).
