= Gerhard Mühlbacher =

Austrian luger (born 1975)

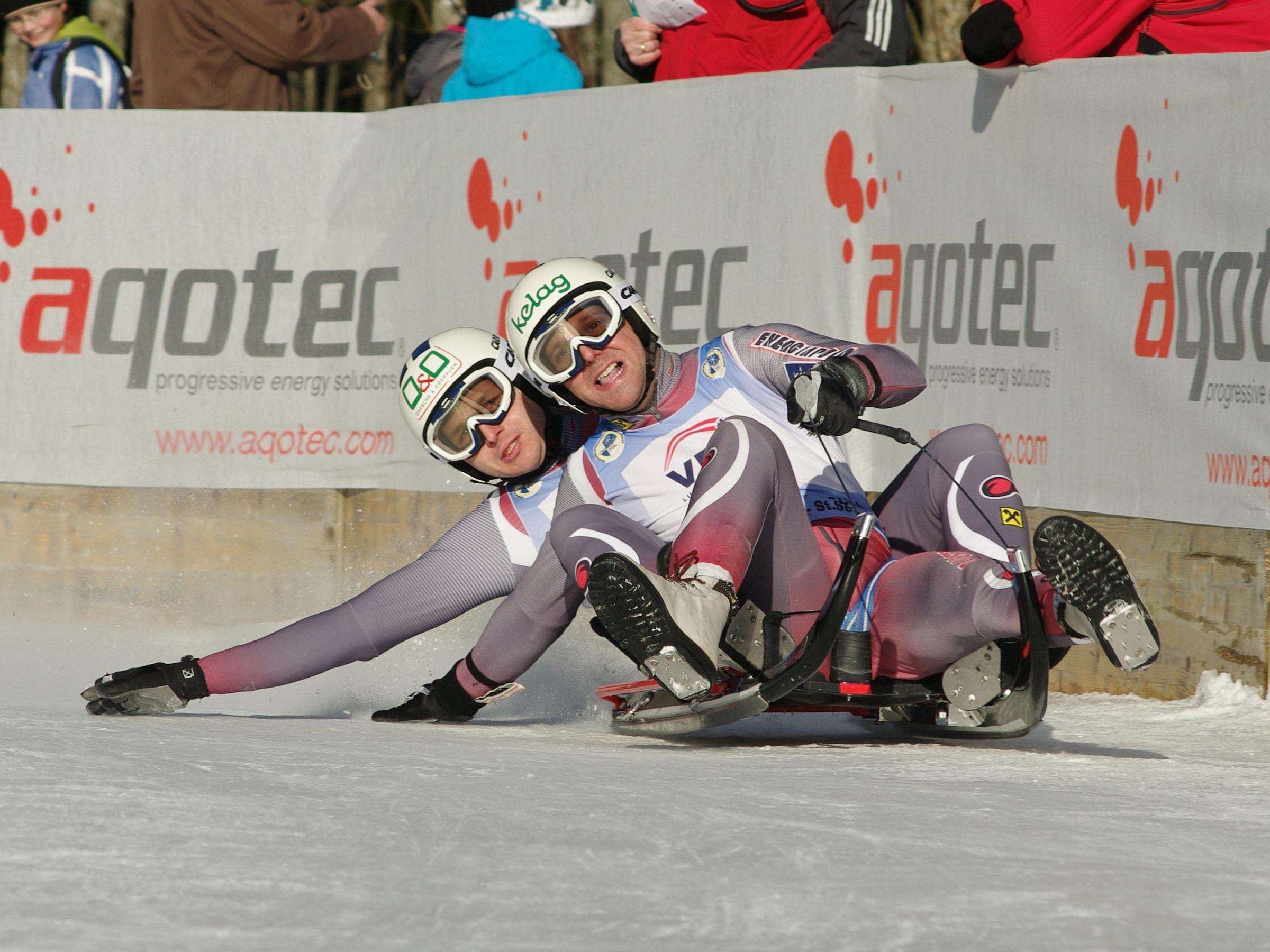
- Gerhard Mühlbacher and Christian Schatz

Medal record

Natural track luge

World Championships
Gold medal – first place	2007 Grande Prairie	Mixed team
Silver medal – second place	2011 Umhausen	Mixed team
Bronze medal – third place	2003 Železniki	Men's doubles
Bronze medal – third place	2007 Grand Prairie	Men's doubles

European Championships
Silver medal – second place	2006 Umhausen	Men's doubles
Bronze medal – third place	2010 St. Sebastien	Mixed team

Gerhard Mühlbacher (born 13 March 1975) is an Austrian luger who has competed since 1998. A natural track luger, he won four medals at the FIL World Luge Natural Track Championships with one gold (Mixed team: 2007), one silver (Mixed team: 2011), and two bronzes (Men's doubles: 2003, 2007).

Mühlbacher also earned two medals at the FIL European Luge Natural Track Championships with a silver (men's doubles: 2006) and a bronze (mixed team: 2010).
