= Melanie Batkowski =

Austrian luger

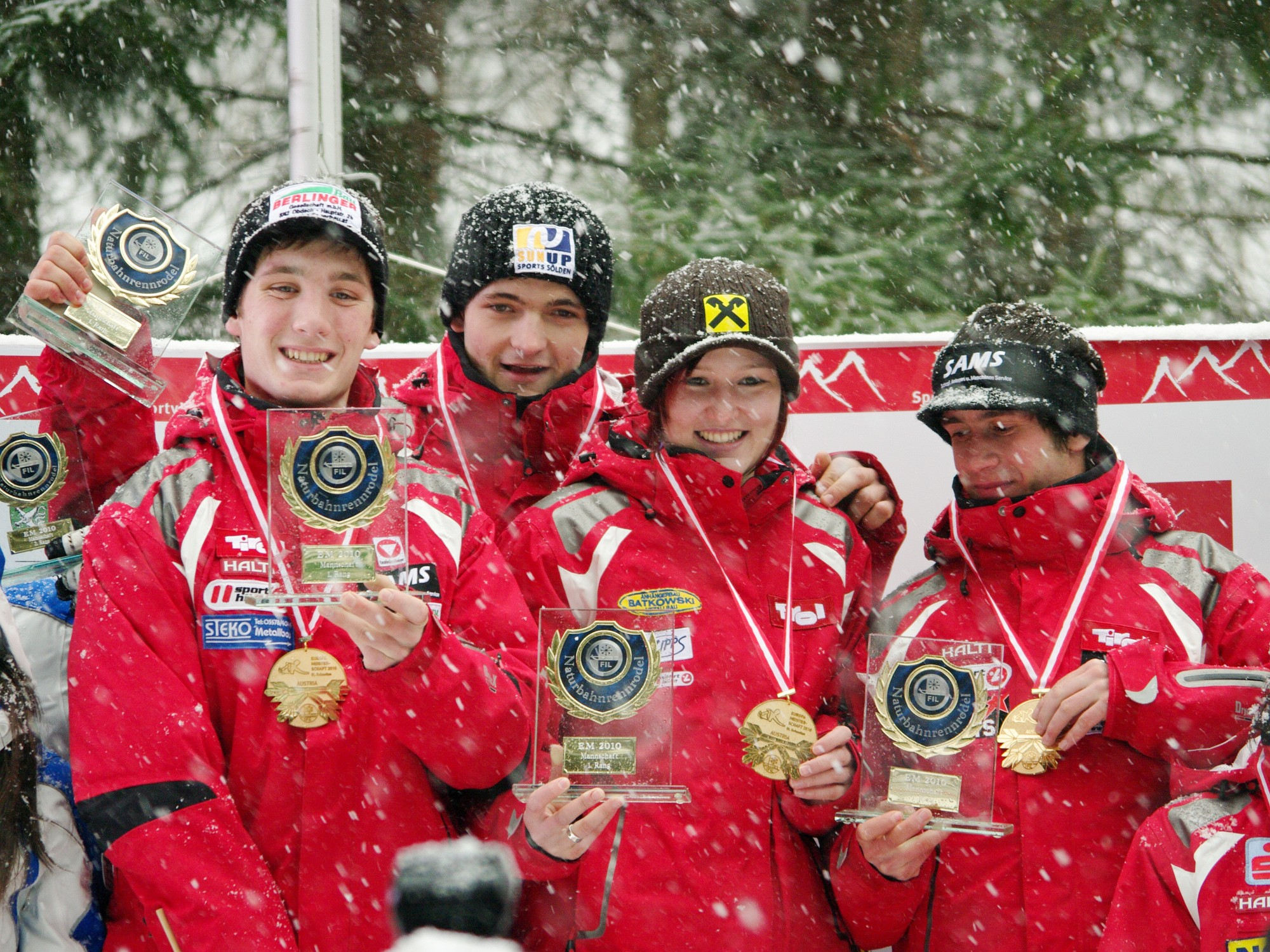
- Batkowski (second from right) at the FIL European Luge Natural Track Championships 2010

Personal information
- Born: 11 February 1989 (age 37)
Medal record
Natural track luge
Representing Austria
World Championships
Gold medal – first place	2005 Latsch	Mixed team
Gold medal – first place	2007 Grand Prairie	Mixed team
Silver medal – second place	2009 Moos	Mixed team
Silver medal – second place	2011 Umhausen	Mixed team
Bronze medal – third place	2007 Grand Prairie	Women's singles
European Championships
Gold medal – first place	2010 St. Sebastian	Mixed team

Melanie Batkowski (born 11 February 1989) is an Austrian luger who has competed since 2004. A natural track luger, she won five medals at the FIL World Luge Natural Track Championships with two golds (Mixed team: 2005, 2007), two silvers (Mixed team: 2009, 2011), and a bronze (Women's singles: 2007).

Batkowski also won gold in the mixed team event at the FIL European Luge Natural Track Championships 2010 in St. Sebastian, Austria.
