= Grubenwand =

Mountain in Austria

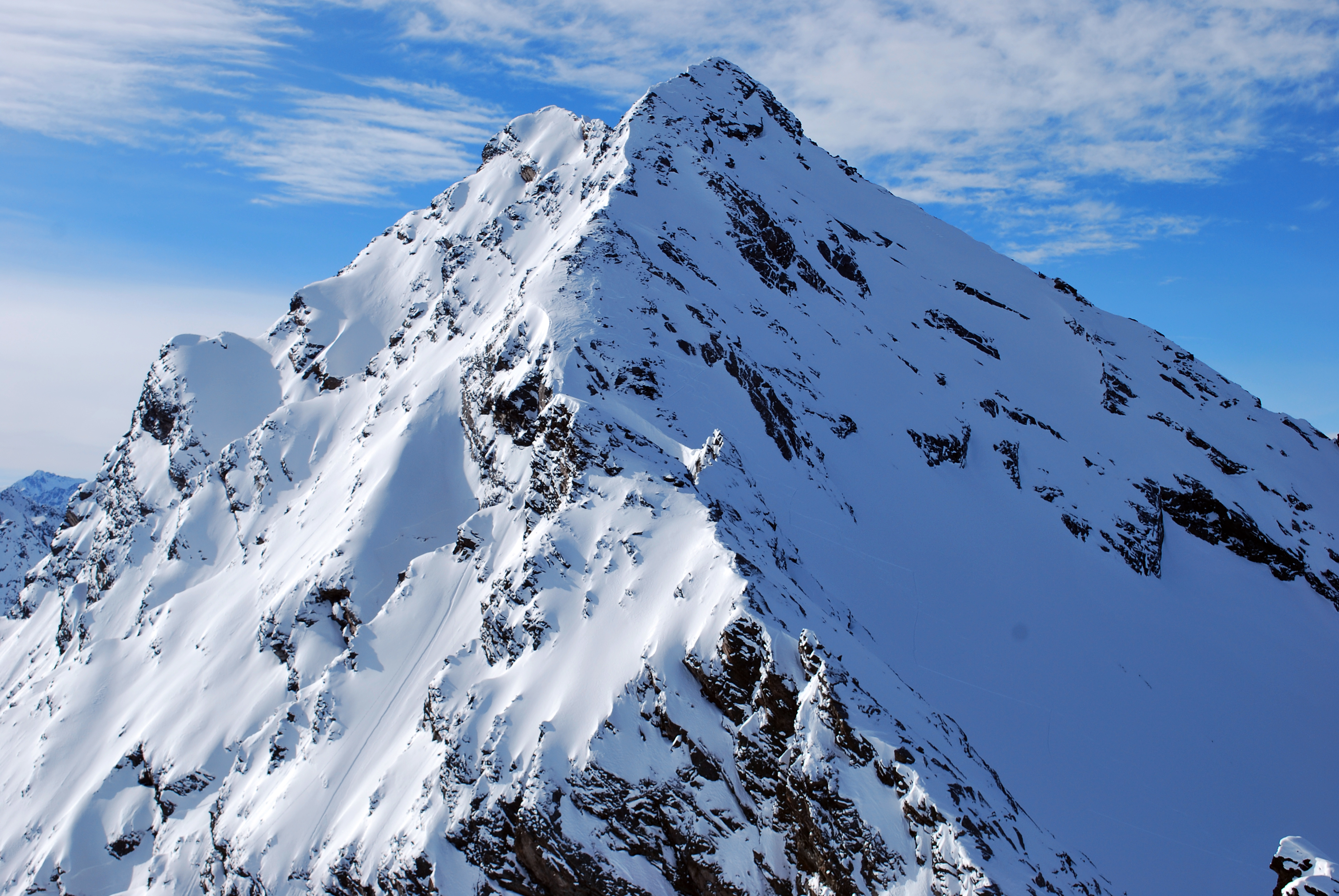
- Northeast aspect

Highest point
- Elevation: 3,173 m (10,410 ft)
- Prominence: 224 m (735 ft)
- Parent peak: Gleirscher Fernerkogel
- Isolation: 1.67 km (1.04 mi)
- Coordinates: 47°07′09″N 11°05′10″E

Geography
- Location within Austria Location within Alps
- Interactive map of Grubenwand
- Country: Austria
- State: Tyrol
- Parent range: Alps; Stubai Alps
- Topo map(s): Tabacco 31 Stubaier Alpen, Sellrain – Kühtai

Geology
- Rock type: Schist

Climbing
- Easiest route: Northeast Ridge

Grubenwand is a mountain in the state of Tyrol in Austria.

== Description ==
Grubenwand is a 3,173-meter-elevation (10,410-foot) summit in the Stubai Alps which is a subrange of the Alps. The mountain is located in the Innsbruck-Land District, 28 kilometers (17.4 miles) southwest of the city of Innsbruck. Precipitation runoff from the mountain's slopes drains into tributaries of the Melach. Topographic relief is significant as the summit rises 1,450 meters (4,757 feet) above the upper Melach valley in 3.5 kilometers (2.17 miles). The mountain has two peaks, Vordere Grubenwand and Hintere Grubenwand, (Front and Rear Grubenwand). The nearest higher mountain is Gleirscher Fernerkogel, 1.77 kilometers (1.1 miles) to the west-southwest.

== Climate ==
Based on the Köppen climate classification, Grubenwand is located in an alpine climate zone with long, cold winters, and short, mild summers. Weather systems are forced upwards by the mountains (orographic lift), causing moisture to drop in the form of rain and snow. The months of June through September offer the most favorable weather for visiting or climbing this mountain.

== Gallery ==
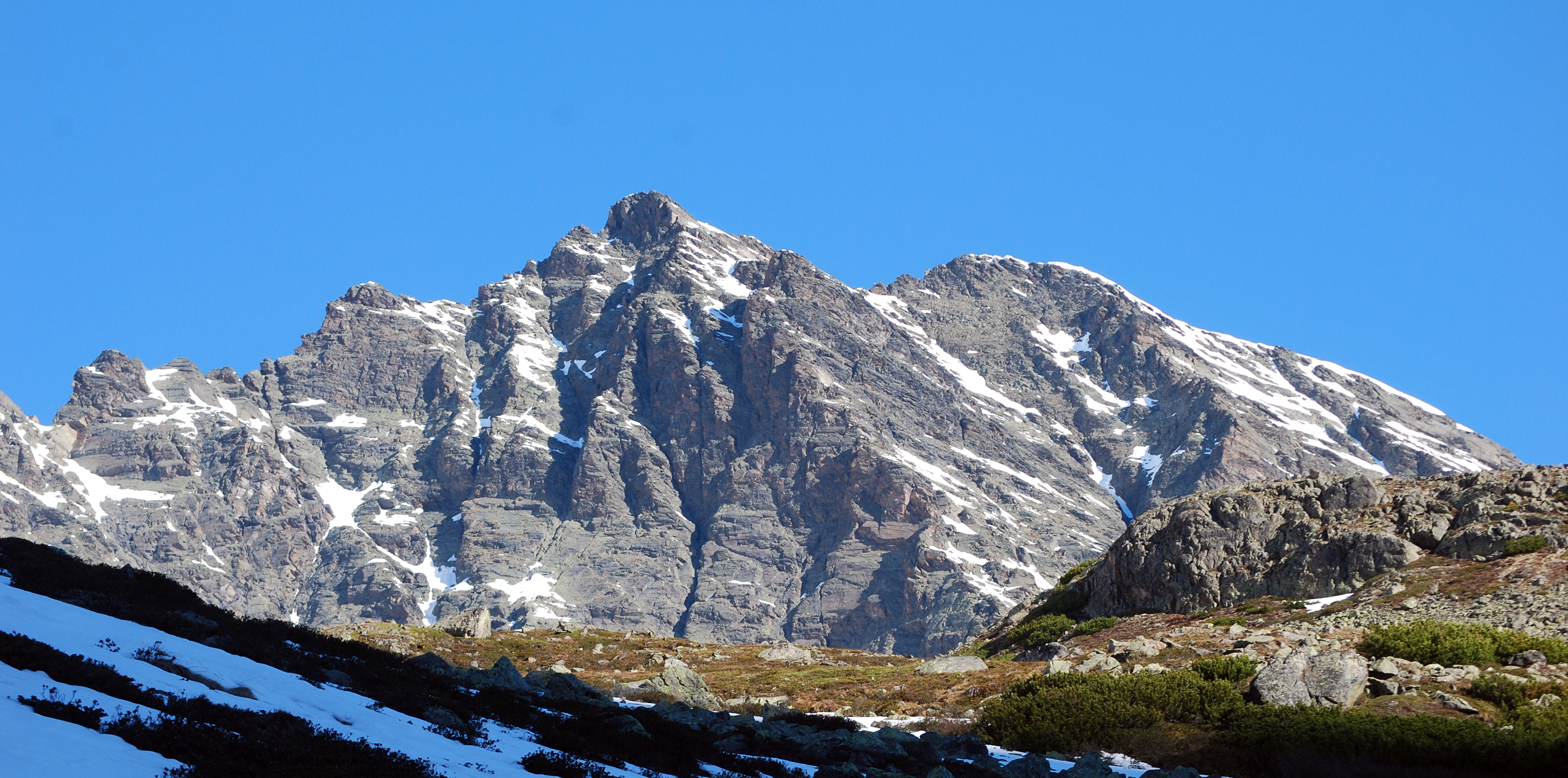
Southeast aspect

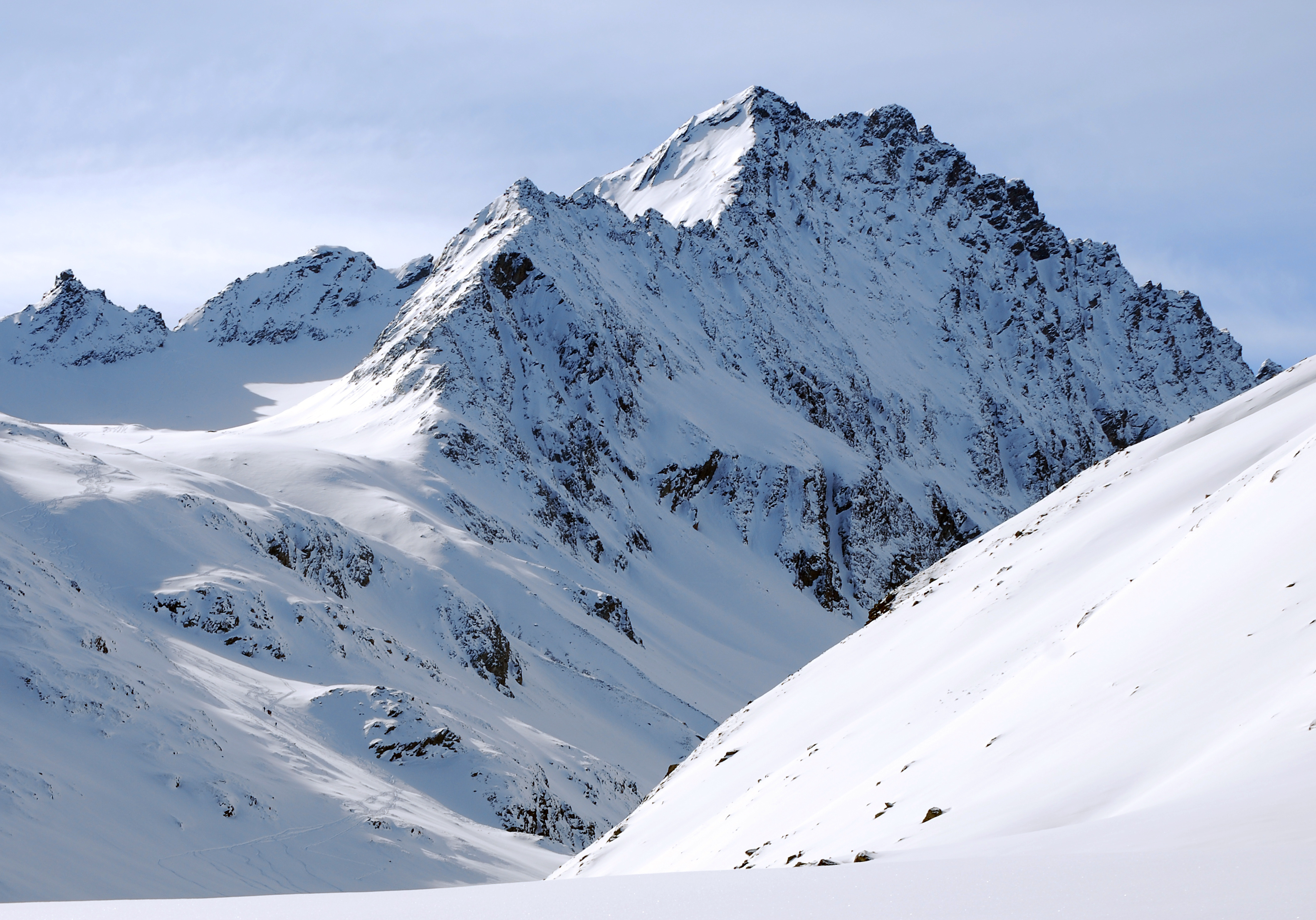
Northwest aspect

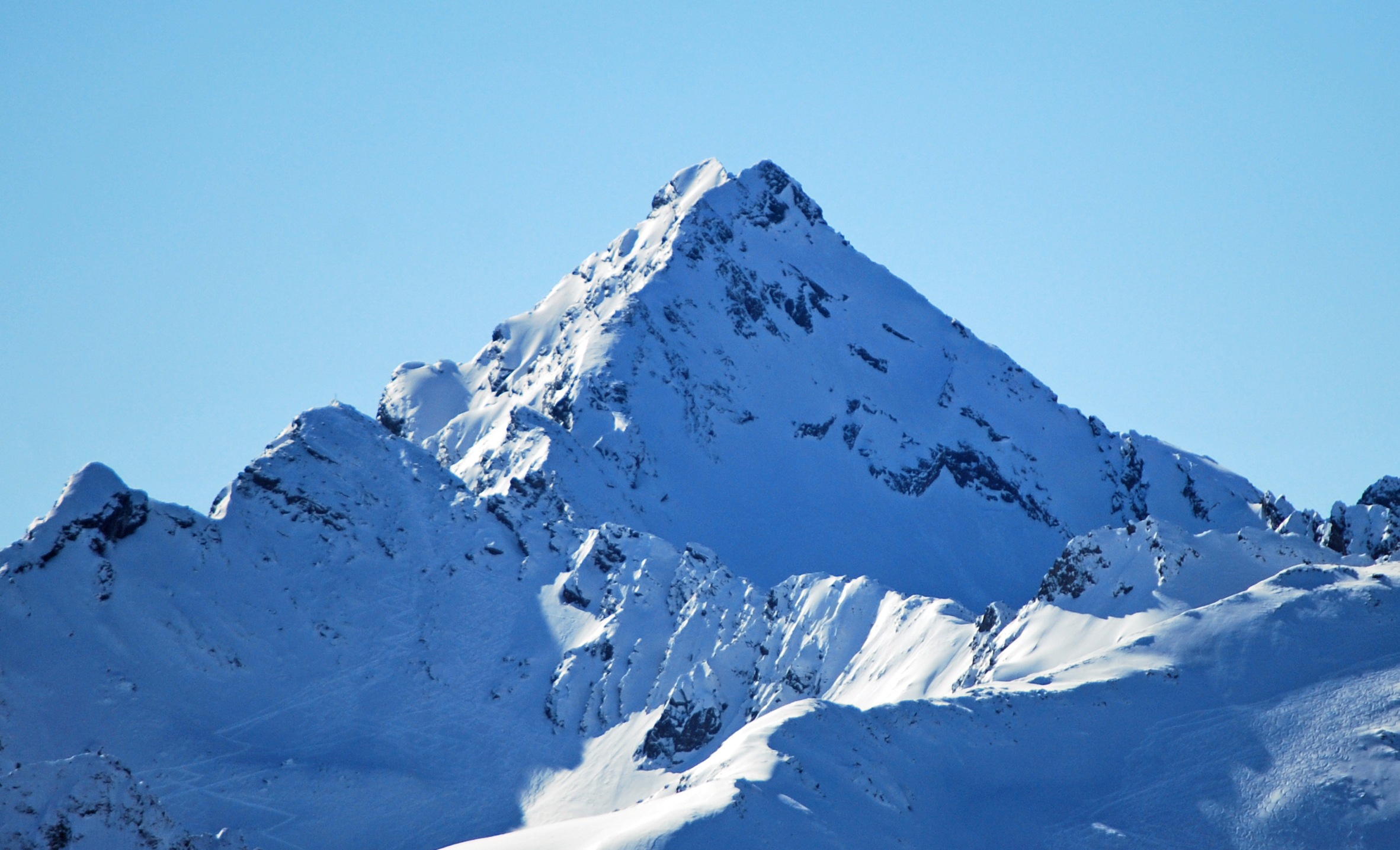
Northeast aspect

== See also ==
- Geography of the Alps
