= Sturzstrom =

Type of landslide

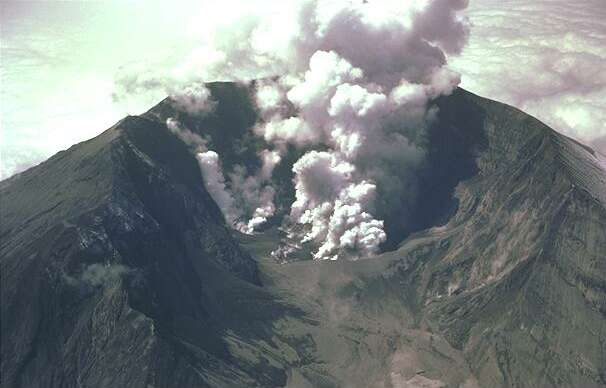
The Mount St. Helens landslide was a sturzstrom. The slide took place on the north face, and created the valley-like gap seen here.

A Sturzstrom (from the German Sturz (fall) and Strom (stream, flow)) or rock avalanche is a large landslide, consisting of soil and rock. It travels a great horizontal distance compared to its initial vertical drop (as much as 20 or 30 times). Sturzstroms have similarities to the flow of glaciers, mudflows, and lava flows. They flow across land fairly easily, and their mobility increases when volume increases. They have been found on other bodies in the Solar System, including the Moon, Mars, Venus, Io, Callisto, Iapetus, and Phobos.

== Movement ==
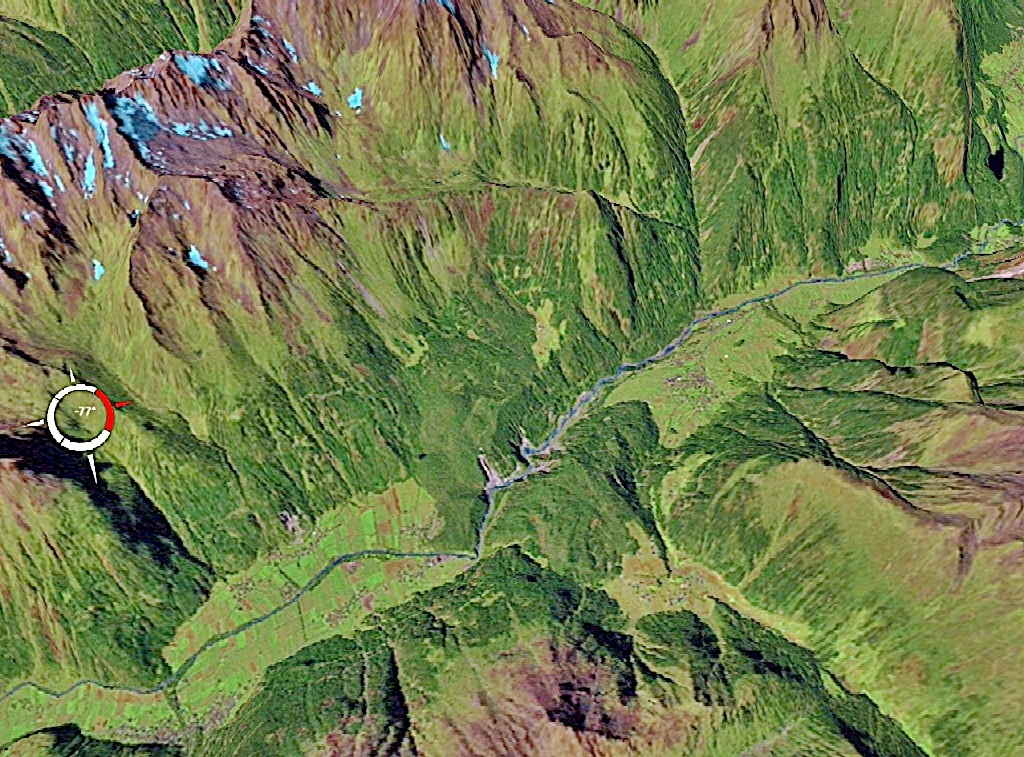
A satellite image of the Köfels landslide showing the debris which flowed into the Ötztal valley. It is estimated that around 3 km^{3} of material were displaced during this slide about 9800 ± 100 years ago.

Sturzstroms may be triggered, similarly to other types of landslides, by heavy rains, earthquakes, or volcanic activity. They move rapidly, but do not necessarily require water to be present to move, and there is no definite explanation for their kinematic characteristics. One theory, the acoustic fluidization theory, hypothesizes that vibrations caused by the collisions among the rock fragments reduce friction and allow the mass to travel great distances. Another theory involves air pockets forming under the slide and providing a cushion that the slide rides over with very low friction, although the merit of this theory has been called into question by the presence of sturzstroms in vacuums such as on the Moon and Phobos. Observation of slides on Iapetus suggests that tiny contact points between bits of ice debris may heat up considerably during the movement, causing melting and forming a more fluid – and thus less friction-limited – mass of material.

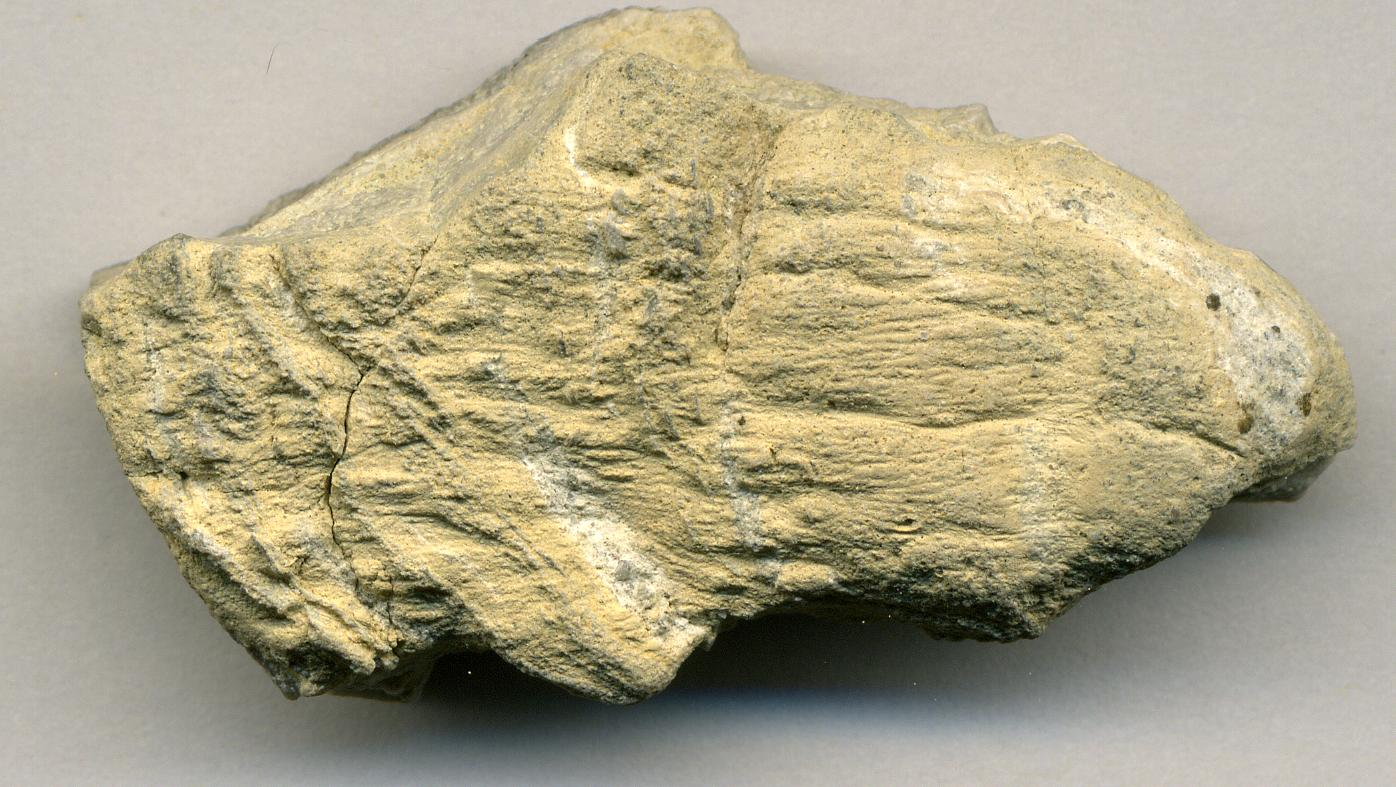
Köfelsite (impactite or frictionite), Köfels Structure, Austria. The sample is 4.1 cm (1.6 in) wide.

The amount of energy in a sturzstrom is much higher than in a typical landslide. Once moving, it can ride over nearly any terrain and will cover much more horizontal ground than downward-sloped ground. Its momentum can even carry the sturzstrom up small hills. The process of detachment, movement and deposition of a sturzstrom can be recorded by seismometers tens of kilometers away. The peculiar characteristics of this seismic signal make it distinguishable from that of small earthquakes. In the large Köfels landslide, which flowed into the Ötztal valley in Tyrol, Austria, deposits of fused rocks, called "frictionite" (or "impactite", or "hyalomylonite"), were found in the landslide debris. This has been hypothesized to be volcanic in origin or the result of a meteorite impact, but the leading hypothesis is that it was due to the large amount of internal friction. Friction between static and moving rocks can create enough heat to fuse rocks to form frictionite.

== See also ==
- Slump
- Rockslide
- Pyroclastic flow
