= Gerald Kammerlander =

Austrian luger (born 1981)

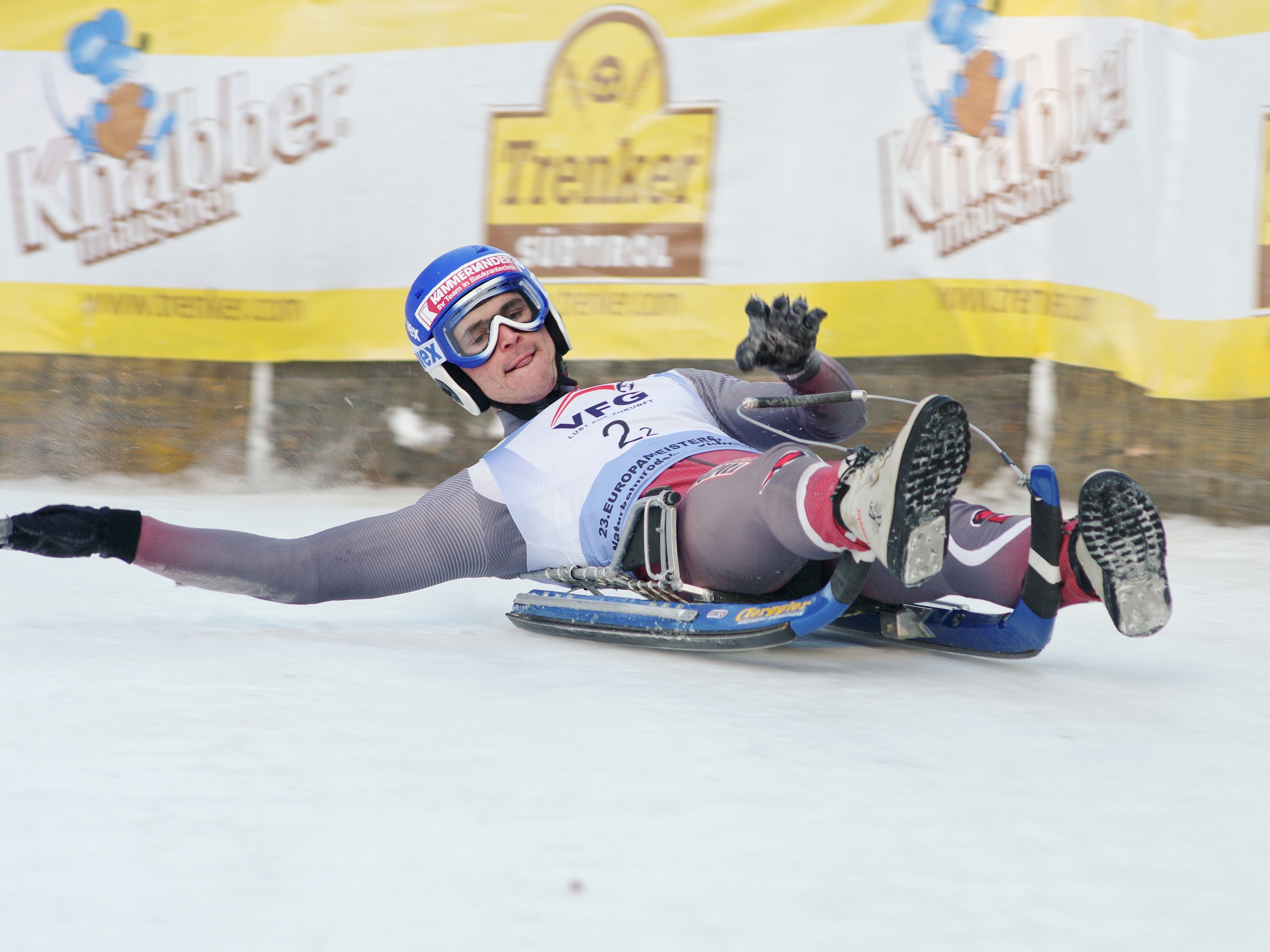

Medal record

Natural track luge

Representing Austria

World Championships
Gold medal – first place	2011 Umhausen	Men's singles
Silver medal – second place	2011 Umhausen	Mixed team
Bronze medal – third place	2007 Grande Prairie	Mixed team

European Championships
Bronze medal – third place	2010 St. Sebastian	Mixed team

Gerald Kammerlander (born 13 August 1981) is an Austrian luger who has competed since 2000. A natural track luger, he won a complete set of medals at the FIL World Luge Natural Track Championships with a gold (Men's singles: 2011), a silver (Mixed team: 2011), and a bronze (Mixed team: 2007).

Kammerlander also won a bronze in the mixed team event at the FIL European Luge Championships 2010 in St. Sebastian, Austria.
