= FIL European Luge Natural Track Championships 2008 =

The FIL European Luge Natural Track Championships 2008 was held 15–17 February in Olang, Italy. The Italians won the most medals in this event with five despite not winning any of the three events.

== Men's singles ==
February 17, 2008. This event was contested over three runs. Pigneter earned his second medal in this year's championships, following his silver medal in the doubles event the previous day.

Medal	Athlete	Time
Gold	Robert Batkowski (AUT)	3:28.16
Silver	Anton Blasbichler (ITA)	3:28.34
Bronze	Patrick Pigneter (ITA)	3:29.18

== Women's singles ==
February 16–17, 2008. This event was contested over three runs.

Medal	Athlete	Time
Gold	Yekaterina Lavrentyeva (RUS)	3:31.01
Silver	Renate Kasslatter (ITA)	3:32.46
Bronze	Renate Gietl (ITA)	3:32.65

== Men's doubles ==
February 16, 2008. This was contested over two runs. It was Porzhnev and Lazarev's third straight championships in this event.

Medal	Athlete	Time
Gold	Russia (Pavel Porzhnev, Ivan Lazarev)	2:25.39
Silver	Italy (Patrick Pigneter, Florian Clara)	2:25.81
Bronze	Russia (Aleksandr Yegorov, Pyotr Popov)	2:27.30

== Medal table ==
Rank	Nation	Gold	Silver	Bronze	Total
1	Russia (RUS)	2	0	1	3
2	Austria (AUT)	1	0	0	1
3	Italy (ITA)	0	3	2	5
Totals (3 entries)		3	3	3	9
