= FIL World Luge Natural Track Championships 2007 =

The FIL World Luge Natural Track Championships 2007 took place in Grande Prairie, Alberta, Canada. It was the first time that the championships were held outside Europe.

== Men's singles ==
Medal	Athlete	Time
Gold	Gernot Schwab (AUT)	
Silver	Gerhard Pilz (AUT)	
Bronze	Patrick Pigneter (ITA)	

== Women's singles ==
Medal	Athlete	Time
Gold	Yekaterina Lavrentyeva (RUS)	
Silver	Yuliya Vetlova (RUS)	
Bronze	Melanie Batkowski (AUT)	

== Men's doubles ==
Medal	Athlete	Time
Gold	Russia (Pavel Porzhnev, Ivan Lazarev)	
Silver	Russia (Aleksandr Yegorov, Pyotr Popov)	
Bronze	Austria (Christian Schatz, Gerhard Mühlbacher)	

== Mixed team ==
Medal	Athlete	Time
Gold	Austria (Melanie Batkowski, Gernot Schwab, Christian Schatz, Gerhard Mühlbacher)	
Silver	Italy (Renate Gietl, Patrick Pigneter, Patrick Pigneter, Florian Clara)	
Bronze	Austria (Marlies Wagner, Gerald Kammerlander, Reinhard Beer, Herbert Kögl}	

== Medal table ==
Rank	Nation	Gold	Silver	Bronze	Total
1	Russia (RUS)	2	2	0	4
2	Austria (AUT)	2	1	3	6
3	Italy (ITA)	0	1	1	2
Totals (3 entries)		4	4	4	12
