= Gleirscher Fernerkogel =

Mountain in Austria

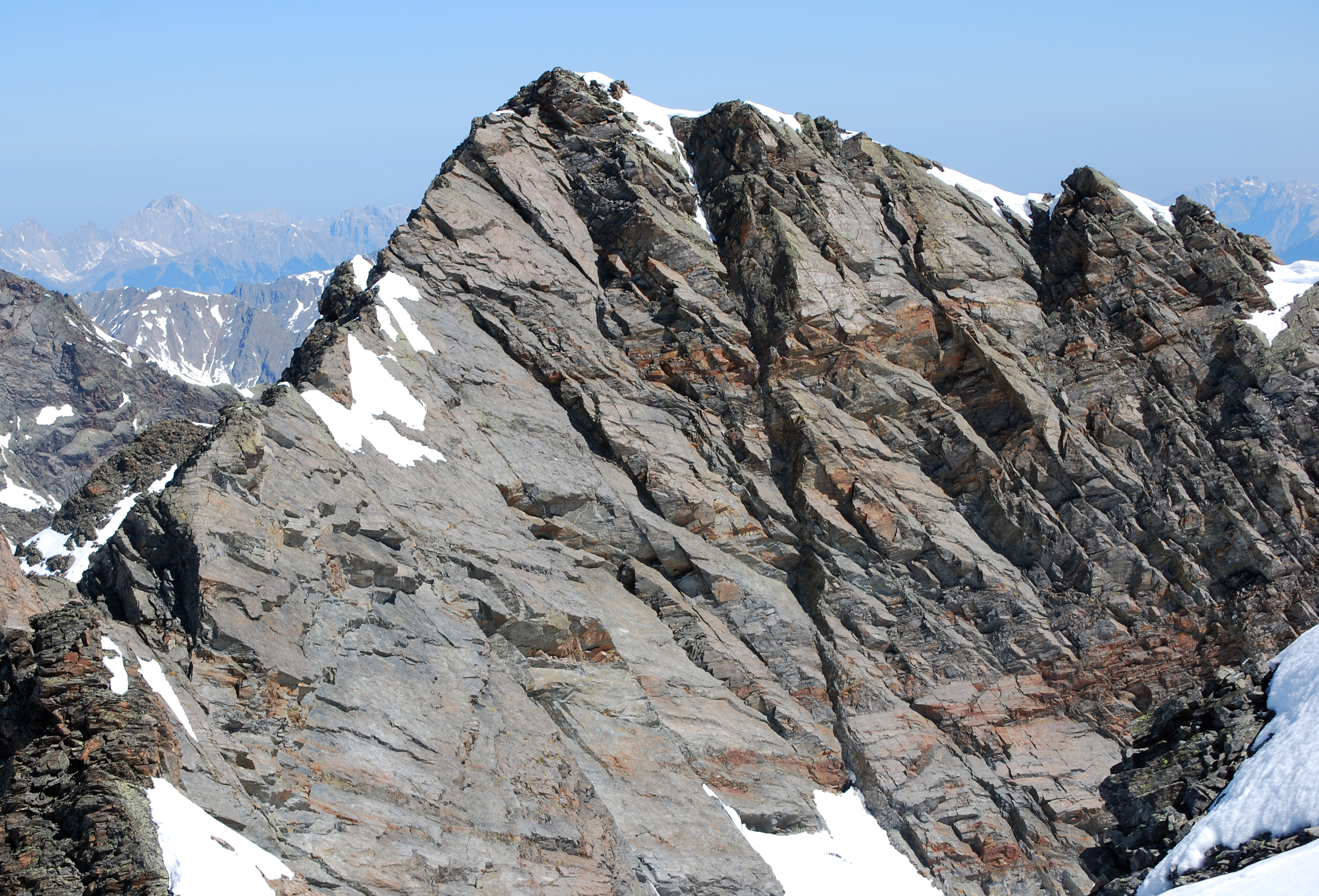
- The Gleirscher Fernerkogel from the Winnebacher Weißkogel to the south

Highest point
- Elevation: 3,189 m (AA) (10,463 ft)
- Prominence: 321 m ↓ Zwieselbachjoch
- Isolation: 3.1 km → Strahlkogel
- Listing: Alpine mountains above 3000 m
- Coordinates: 47°06′53″N 11°03′47″E

Geography
- Location within Austria
- Location: Tyrol, Austria
- Parent range: Stubai Alps

Climbing
- First ascent: 1 September 1883 by Ludwig Purtscheller and Hans Schöller (touristic)
- Normal route: Glacier tour from the Gleirschtal valley and up the east face

The Gleirscher Fernerkogel, also Gleirschfernerkogl, formerly called the Roßkarspitze, is a mountain, 3,189 m (AA), in the Southern Sellrain Mountains, a subgroup of the Stubai Alps. It rises in the Austrian state of Tyrol. The old name, Roßkarspitze, was given to it during the military survey of the region in the 1850s. The first documented ascent was undertaken on 1 September 1883 by Ludwig Purtscheller and Hans Schöller, a "professor from Salzburg". Purtscheller gave the mountain its present name. A prominent 500-metre-long ridge runs eastwards from the unimposing summit.

== Surrounding area ==
The Gleirscher Fernerkogel lies a good seven kilometres as the crow flies northeast of Längenfeld in the Ötztal valley and just under 7 km southwest Praxmar in the Lüsenstal valley. To the east two glaciers climb the mountain to a height of 3,100 metres. North of the east ridge is the Gleirschferner glacier; to the south is the Weißkogelferner, rapidly disappearing as a result of global warming, whose firn field is now only just under 300 metres long. Neighbouring peaks are the Hintere Grubenwand (3,175 m) on the east ridge, separated by the col of Roßkarscharte (3,053 m); the Winnebacher Weißkogel (3,185 m) to the south; and the Sonnenwände peaks to the north, whose highest top is the Hintere Sonnenwand (3,112 m). To the west the 500-metre-high rock face of the Gleirscher Fernerkogel drops steeply into the valley of the Zwieselbach.

== Bases and tours ==
The route taken by the first climbers ran from the valley of Gleirschtal to the north, across the Gleirschferner glacier heading southwest up the East Face (Ostwand) and East Ridge to the summit. Today, this normal route runs as a high mountain tour (only to be attempted with the right equipment and knowledge) from the Neue Pforzheimer Hut (2,308 m) in the upper Gleirschtal. The route runs over the glacier towards the col of Roßkarscharte, up to the rockfall-prone East Face of the Kogel, which according to the literature is classed as a moderately difficult climb at UIAA grade II to the summit. The direct route along the East Ridge involves difficult climbing at UIAA grade IV. The journey time from the hut is 5 hours. Other routes to the Gleirscher Fernerkogel run along the South Ridge (UIAA grade II) from the Westfalenhaus (2,273 m) in 3 hours, or up the South Face assessed as UIAA grade III.

== Literature and maps ==
- Walter Klier: Stubaier Alpen, Alpine Club Guide, Munich, 2006, ISBN 3-7633-1271-4
- Eduard Richter (ed.): Die Erschließung der Ostalpen, II. Band, Verlag des Deutschen und Oesterreichischen Alpenvereins, Berlin, 1894
- Alpine Club map 1:25,000 series, Sheet 31/2 Stubaier Alpen, Sellrain
