= Aleksandr Yegorov (luger) =

Russian luger (born 1985)

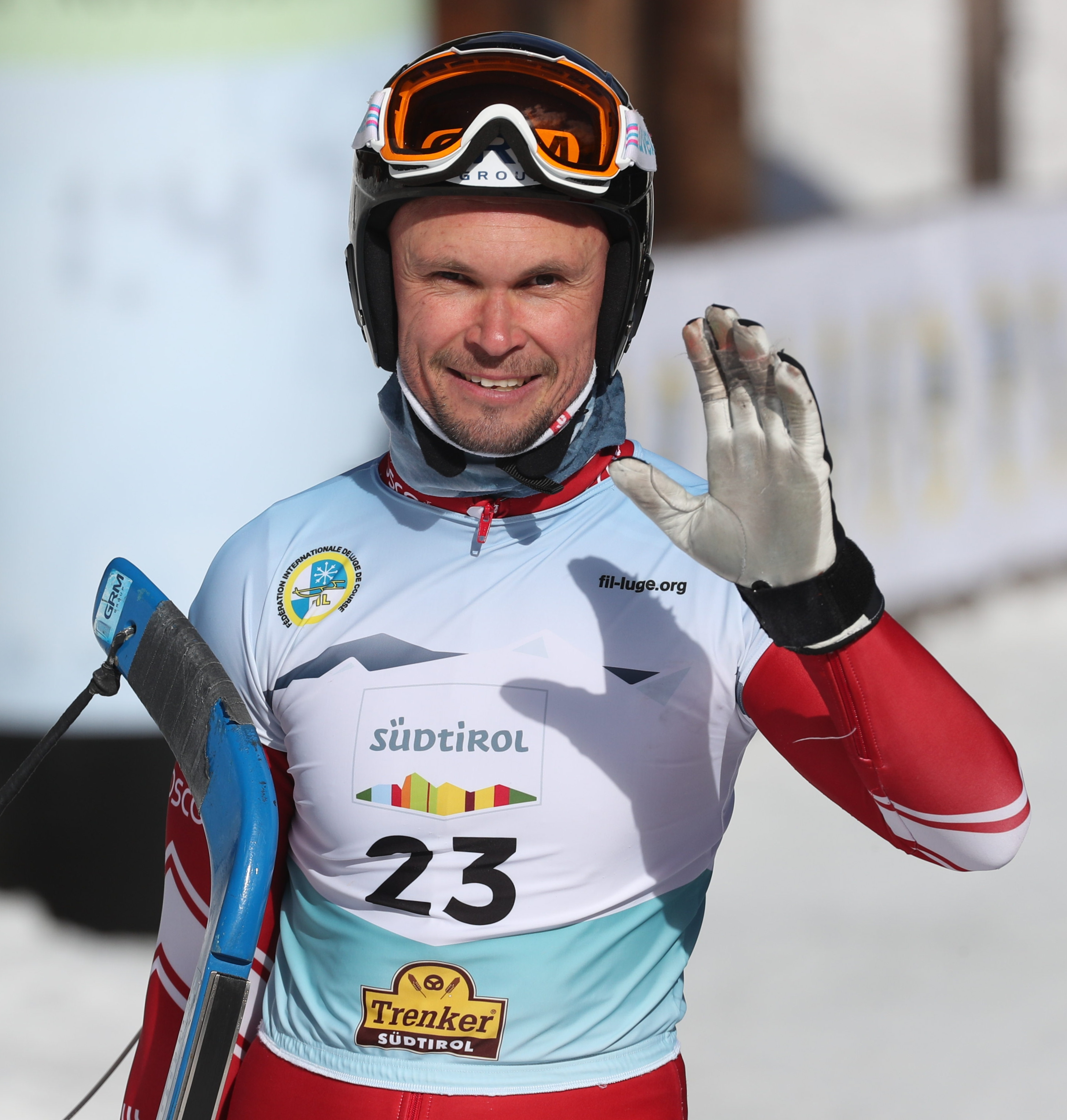
- Yegorov in 2022

Medal record

Natural track luge

World Championships
Silver medal – second place	2007 Grande Prairie	Men's doubles

European Championships
Bronze medal – third place	2008 Olang	Men's doubles
Bronze medal – third place	2010 St. Sebastian	Men's doubles

Aleksandr Yegorov (born 26 October 1985) is a Russian luger who has competed since 2002. A natural track luger, he won the silver medal in the men's doubles event at the 2007 FIL World Luge Natural Track Championships in Grande Prairie, Alberta, Canada.

Yegorov also won two bronzes in the men's doubles event at the FIL European Luge Natural Track Championships, earning them in 2008 and 2010.
