= Strahlkogel =

Mountain in Austria

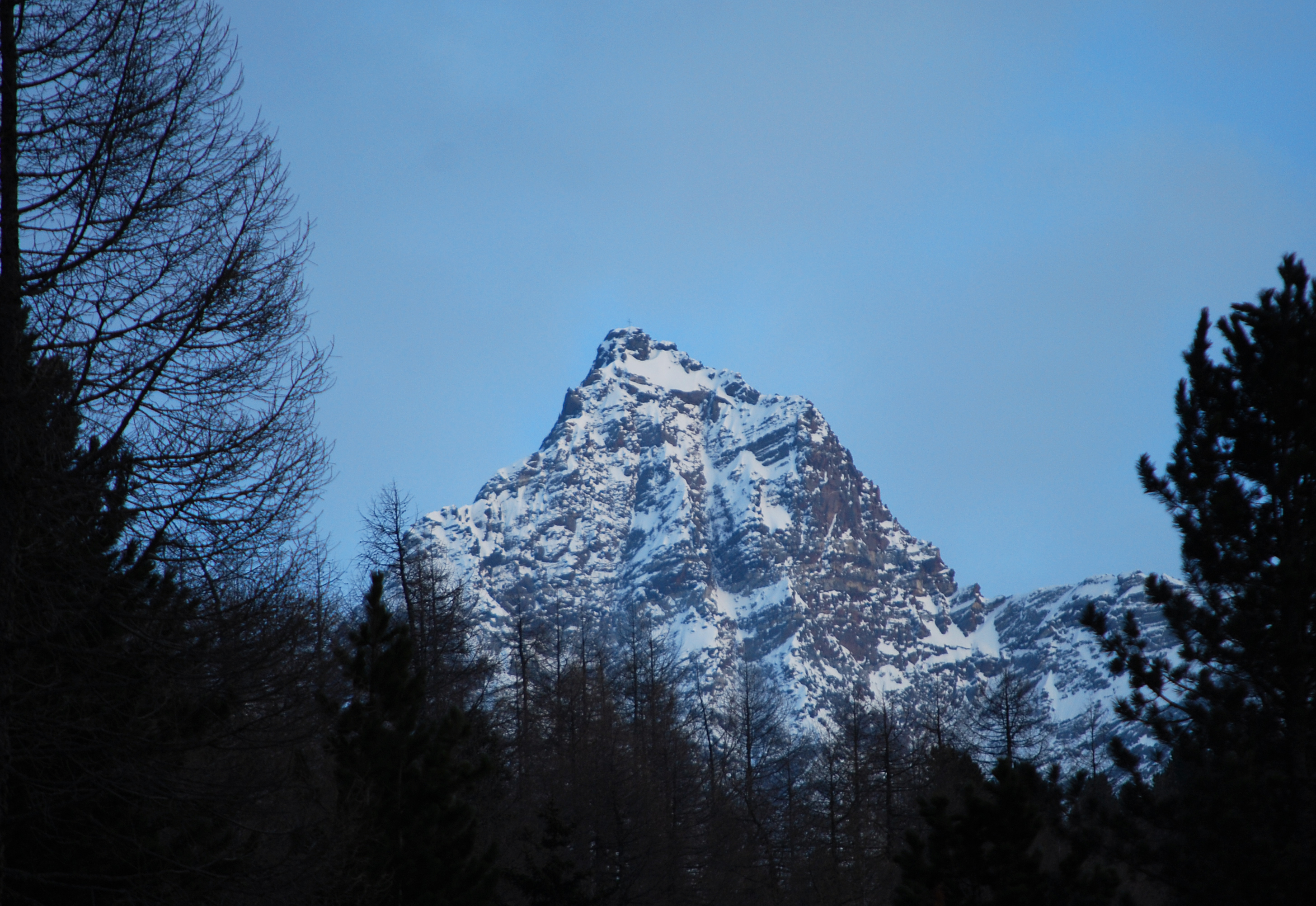
- The Strahlkogel from the north

Highest point
- Elevation: 3,288 m (AA) (10,787 ft)
- Prominence: 3,288-2,782 m ↓ Winnebachjoch
- Isolation: 7.1 km → Vorderer Brunnenkogel
- Listing: Alpine mountains above 3000 m
- Coordinates: 47°06′35″N 11°01′09″E

Geography
- Location within Austria
- Location: Tyrol, Austria
- Parent range: Stubai Alps

Geology
- Rock type(s): gneiss and hornblende slate

Climbing
- First ascent: 1833 by Peter Carl Thurwieser, probably led by two chamois hunters
- Normal route: from the Larstighöfen near Niederthai to the Grasstaller See, along the den Grasstallferner and the Westgrat as a glacier tour

The Strahlkogel, at 3,288 m (AA), is the highest peak in the Larstiger Mountains (Larstiger Berge), a subgroup of the Stubai Alps in the Austrian state of Tyrol. The Strahlkogel is also the highest mountain in the municipality of Umhausen. Its name comes from its great, white, light-reflecting, quartz layers, which allegedly cause the mountain to "radiate" (strahlen). It has the shape of a well-proportioned, steep and pointed pyramid. Ascending the Strahlkogel is difficult and it is thus only rarely visited, unlike the neighbouring 3,287-metre-high Breiter Grieskogel. The first ascent of the mountain was in 1833 by Peter Carl Thurwieser, but his route and the precise circumstances of the climb have not been passed on. On 28 August 1887 Ludwig Purtscheller and Fritz Drasch from Salzburg climbed the mountain. Their route led along the west arête. Today, this is the normal route and easiest way to reach the summit.

== Area ==
The Strahlkogel lies a good five kilometres as the crow flies northeast of Längenfeld in the Ötztal valley and 7 km west-southwest of Lüsens in the Lisenstal valley. It is surrounded by glaciers to the east and west. The steep and heavily crevassed Larstigferner to the east reaches a height of up to 3,200 metres, and in the south lies the flatter, but wider Grasstallferner, that reaches a height of 3,100 metres. Its neighbouring peaks are the 3,287-metre-high Breiter Grießkogel on the ice divide between the Grasstallferner and Grießferner glaciers, the Grasstaller Grießkogel (3,160 m) on the prominent Strahlkogel West Arete, and the Larstigspitze (3,173 m) to the east, separated by the Larstigscharte notch (3,032 m).

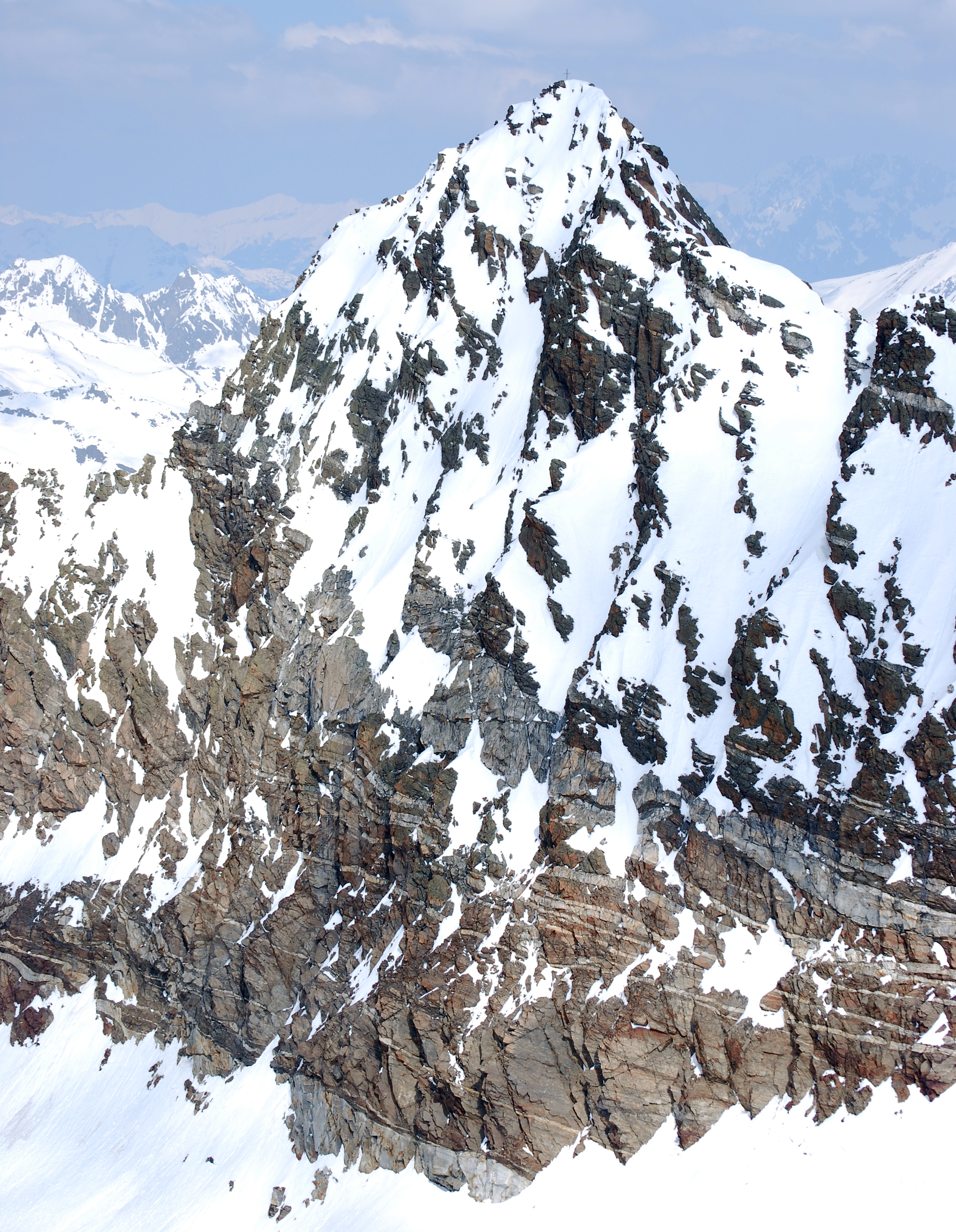
The Strahlkogel seen from the Breiter Grieskogel. The great bands of quartz on the south face are clearly visible.

== Start points and paths ==
The present normal route to the Strahlkogel runs along the West Arete. The start point for an ascent is the village of Niederthai in the Ötztal valley at a height of 1,538 metres above sea level. From there the route runs southwards to the lake of Grasstallsee, then east on the Grasstallferner glacier as a mountain tour (only to be attempted with the right equipment and experience) and along the west arete requiring climbing of UIAA grade II - III sections to the summit. According to the literature the ascent takes about five hours. The Strahlkogel may, however, also be ascended via very difficult climbing routes up the south flank and along the southeast arete. The start point for this approach is the Winnebachsee Hut (2,362 m) above Gries im Sulztal.

== Literature and maps ==
- Walter Klier: Alpine Club Guide Stubaier Alpen, Munich, 2006, ISBN 3-7633-1271-4
- Eduard Richter: Die Erschließung der Ostalpen, II. Band, Berlin, Verlag des Deutschen und Oesterreichischen Alpenvereins, 1894
- Alpine Club Map 1:25,000, Sheet 31/2 Stubaier Alpen, Sellrain
