= Umhausen =

- Municipality
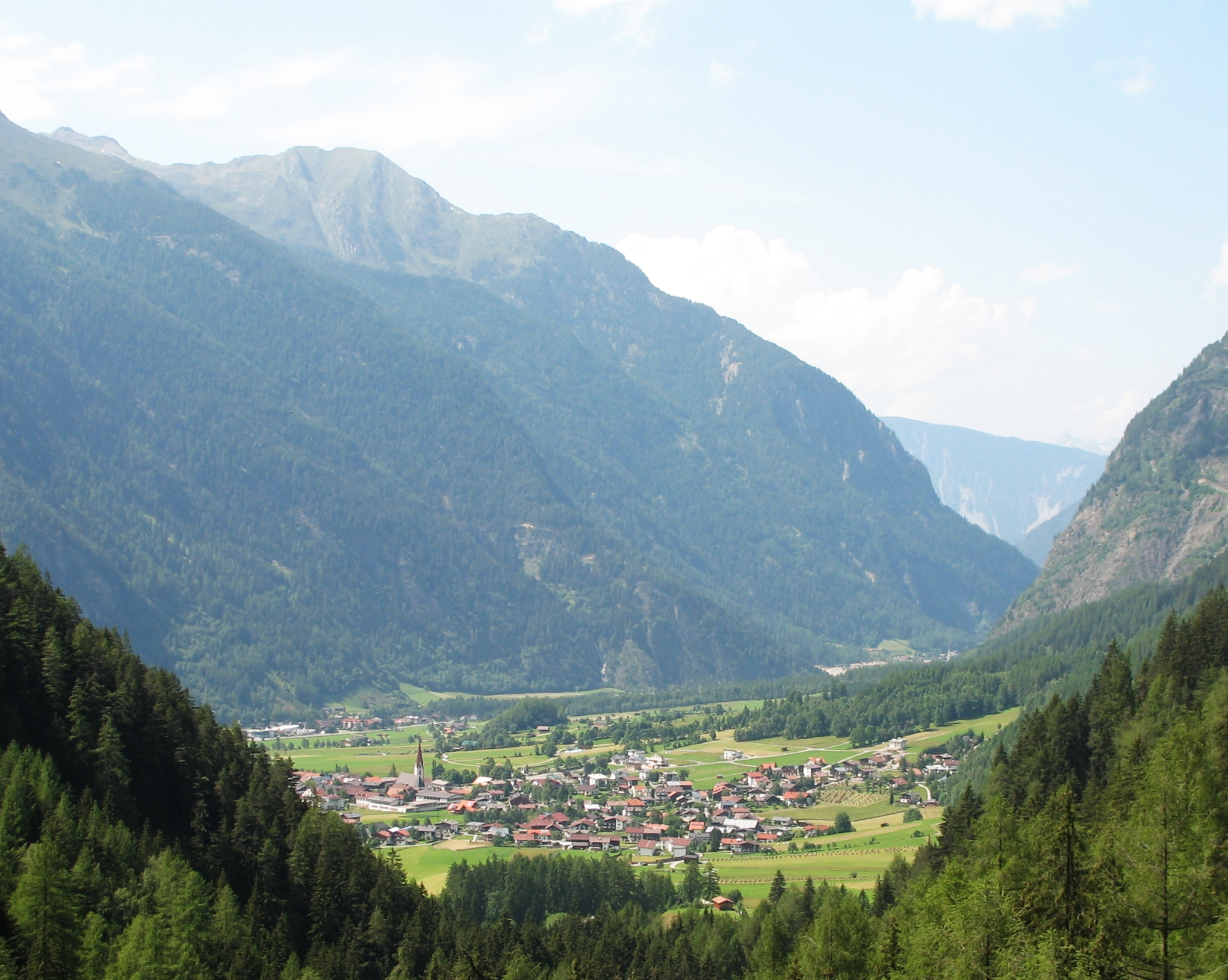
- Umhausen seen from Niederthal

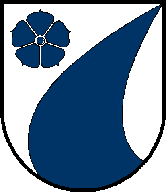
- Coat of arms

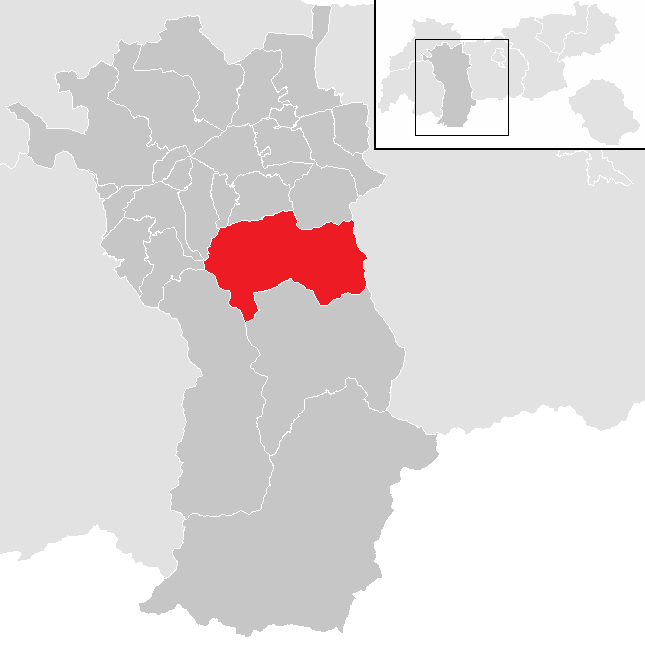
- Location in the district

- Location within Austria
- Coordinates: 47°07′00″N 10°55′00″E
- Country: Austria
- State: Tyrol
- District: Imst

Government
  - Mayor: Jakob Wolf

Area
  - Total: 137.42 km^{2} (53.06 sq mi)
- Elevation: 1,031 m (3,383 ft)

Population (2021)
  - Total: 3,379
  - Density: 24.59/km^{2} (63.68/sq mi)
- Time zone: UTC+1 (CET)
  - Summer (DST): UTC+2 (CEST)
- Postal code: 6441
- Area code: 05255
- Vehicle registration: IM
- Website: https://www.umhausen.gv.at/

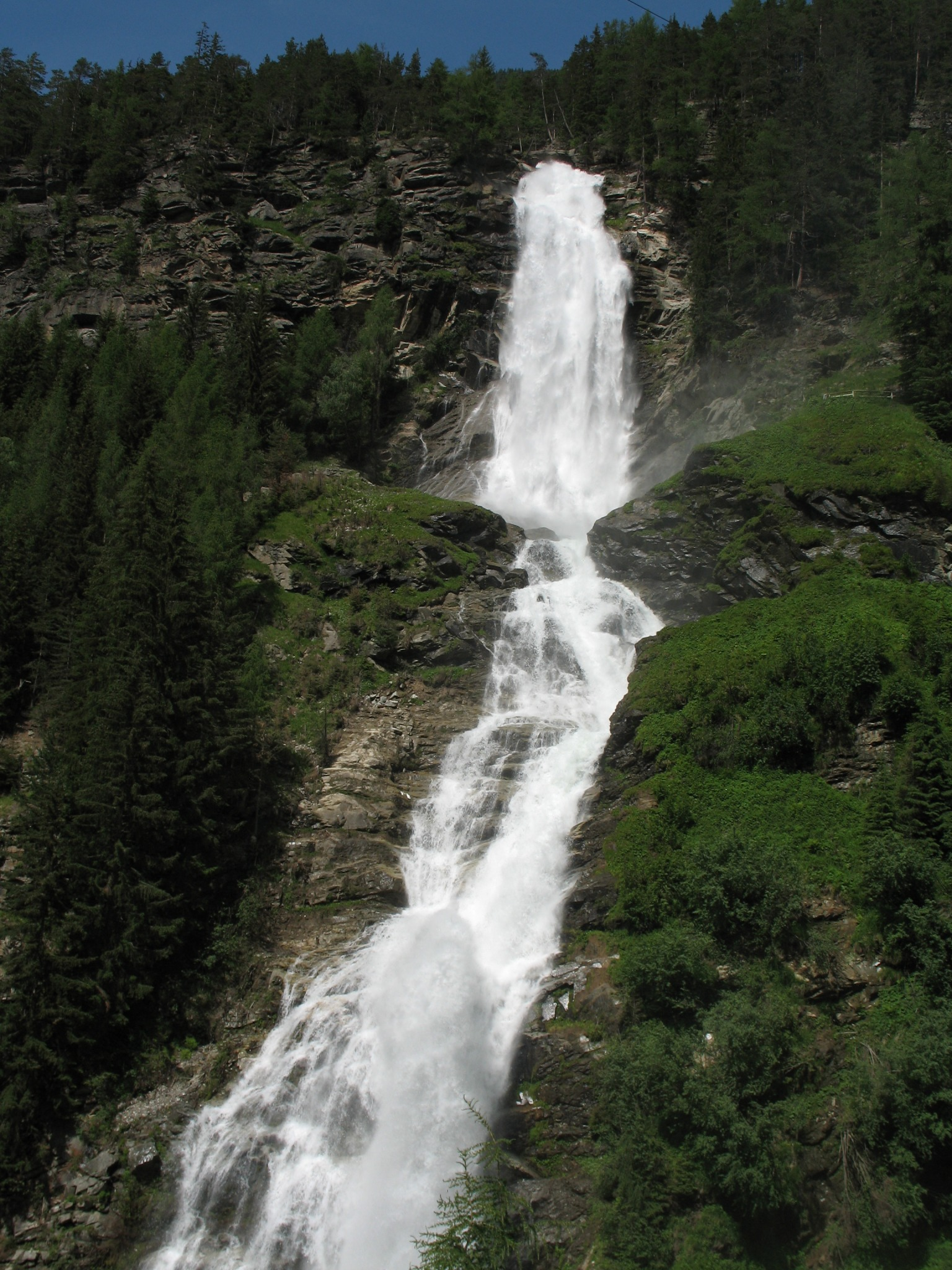
Stuiben – waterfall

Umhausen is a municipality in the Imst district of state of Tyrol in western Austria. It and is located 17 km southeast of Imst at the Ötztaler Ache in the Ötztal. It has 3078 inhabitants.

== Geography ==
The municipality consists of six villages:

- Umhausen
- Tumpen
- Köfels
- Farst
- Niederthai
- Östen

Umhausen is located at the intersection of the Stubai Alps and the Ötztal Alps. The lowest point is in Tumpen (920m), the highest peak of the municipality is the Strahlkogel, at 3,288 m (AA). Its name comes from its great, white, light-reflecting, quartz layers, which allegedly cause the mountain to "radiate" (strahlen). It has the shape of a well-proportioned, steep and pointed pyramid. Ascending the Strahlkogel is difficult and it is thus only rarely visited, unlike the neighbouring 3,287-metre-high Breiter Grieskogel.

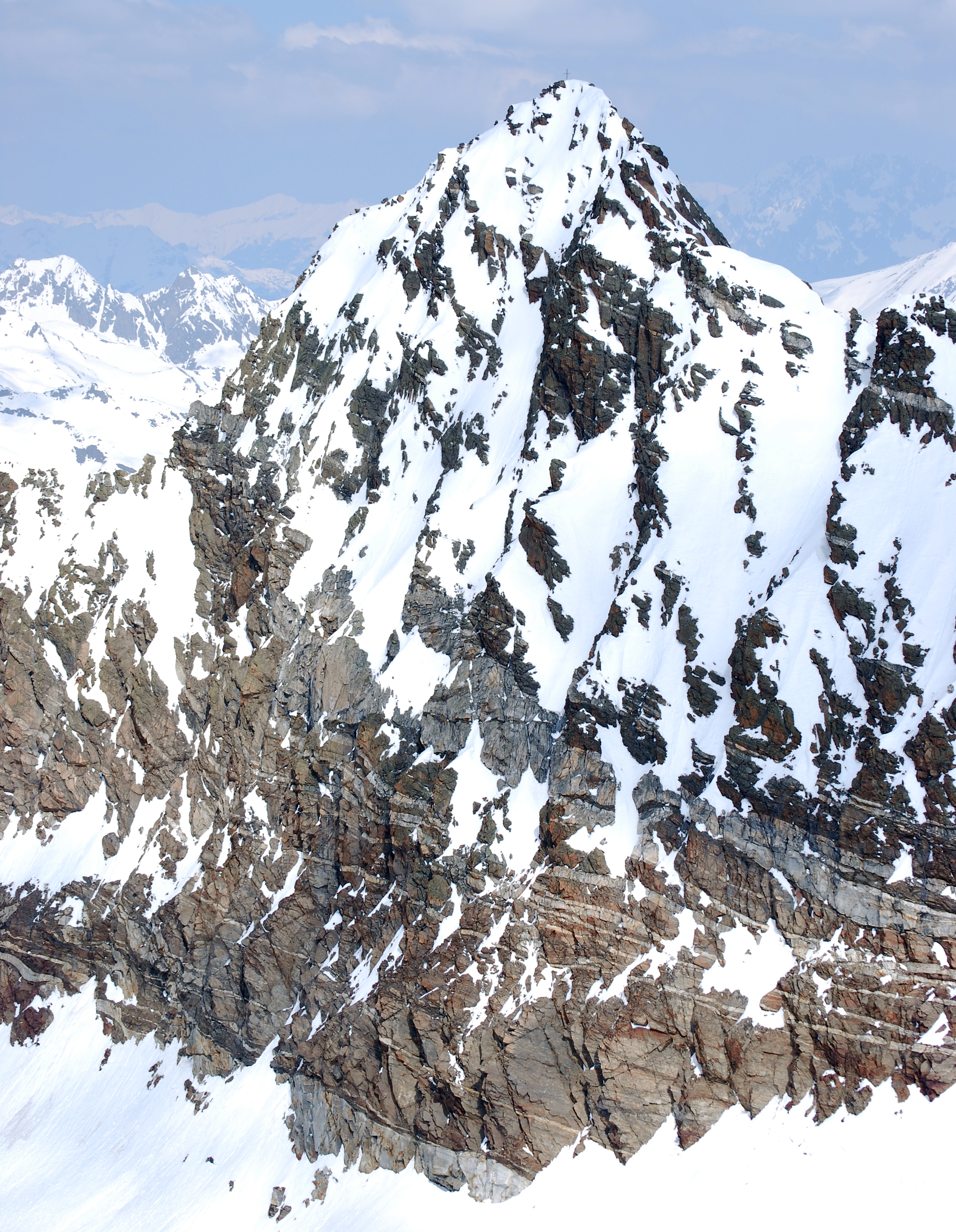
The Strahlkogel seen from the Breiter Grieskogel. The great bands of quartz on the south face are clearly visible.

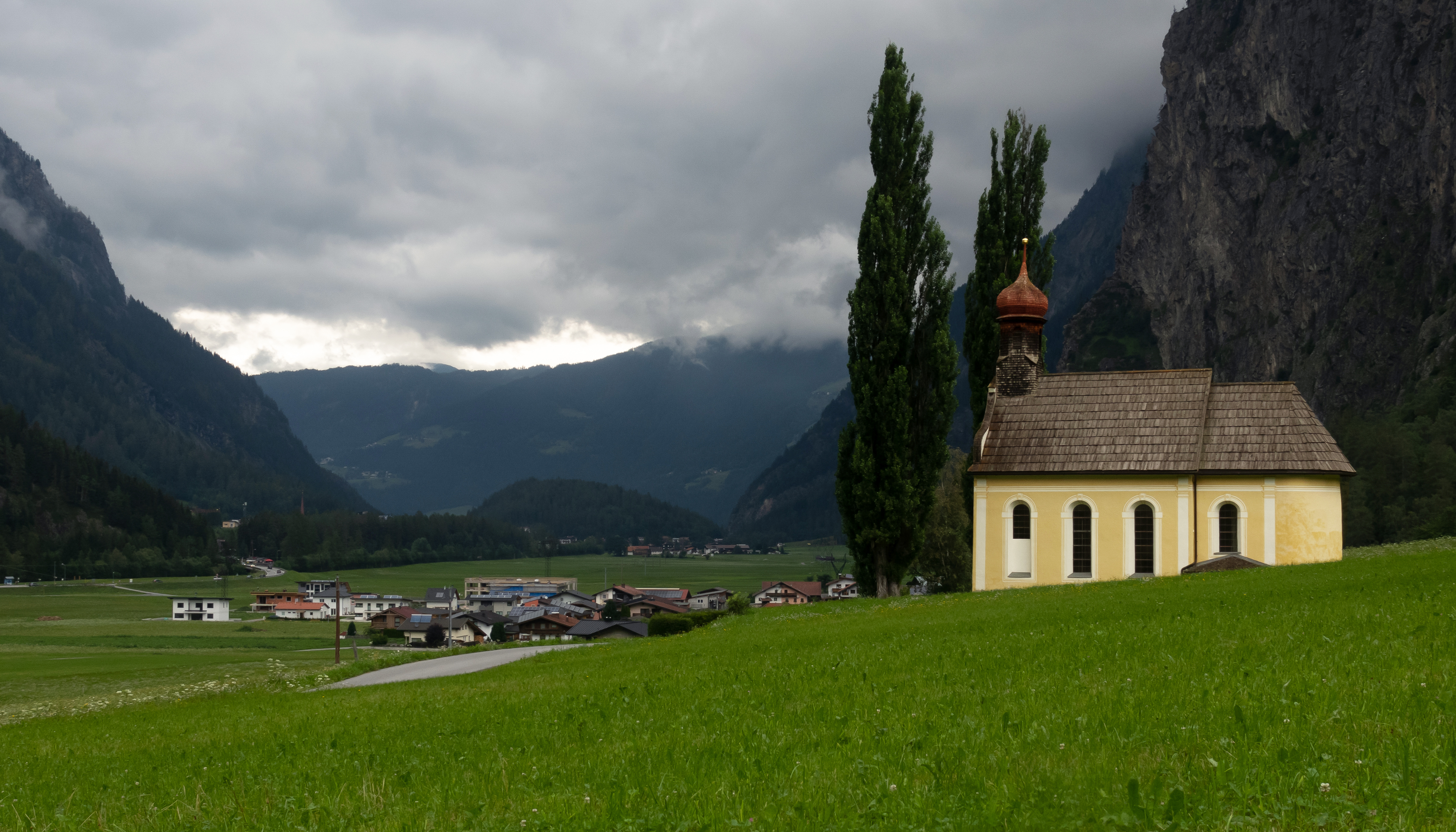
Church (Wallfahrtskirche Maria Schnee) in Östen

=== Climate ===
Climate data for Umhausen (1971–2000)
Month	Jan	Feb	Mar	Apr	May	Jun	Jul	Aug	Sep	Oct	Nov	Dec	Year
Record high °C (°F)	16.5 (61.7)	17.2 (63.0)	20.6 (69.1)	23.3 (73.9)	29.1 (84.4)	31.0 (87.8)	34.0 (93.2)	34.0 (93.2)	29.5 (85.1)	23.1 (73.6)	21.0 (69.8)	16.6 (61.9)	34.0 (93.2)
Mean daily maximum °C (°F)	2.8 (37.0)	4.6 (40.3)	8.6 (47.5)	12.1 (53.8)	17.3 (63.1)	19.9 (67.8)	22.2 (72.0)	21.7 (71.1)	18.2 (64.8)	13.3 (55.9)	6.5 (43.7)	3.1 (37.6)	12.5 (54.5)
Daily mean °C (°F)	−2.6 (27.3)	−1.5 (29.3)	2.2 (36.0)	5.7 (42.3)	10.6 (51.1)	13.3 (55.9)	15.4 (59.7)	15.0 (59.0)	11.4 (52.5)	6.8 (44.2)	1.2 (34.2)	−1.7 (28.9)	6.3 (43.3)
Mean daily minimum °C (°F)	−6.1 (21.0)	−5.4 (22.3)	−2.1 (28.2)	1.0 (33.8)	5.3 (41.5)	8.2 (46.8)	10.4 (50.7)	10.2 (50.4)	7.0 (44.6)	2.9 (37.2)	−2.1 (28.2)	−5.0 (23.0)	2.0 (35.6)
Record low °C (°F)	−23.0 (−9.4)	−21.0 (−5.8)	−18.5 (−1.3)	−8.3 (17.1)	−6.4 (20.5)	−0.3 (31.5)	2.1 (35.8)	1.3 (34.3)	−4.0 (24.8)	−9.5 (14.9)	−15.9 (3.4)	−19.8 (−3.6)	−23.0 (−9.4)
Average precipitation mm (inches)	32.6 (1.28)	28.1 (1.11)	41.5 (1.63)	37.3 (1.47)	62.6 (2.46)	93.5 (3.68)	103.1 (4.06)	100.7 (3.96)	62.1 (2.44)	44.8 (1.76)	46.7 (1.84)	39.3 (1.55)	692.3 (27.26)
Average snowfall cm (inches)	30.2 (11.9)	28.0 (11.0)	23.1 (9.1)	8.7 (3.4)	1.4 (0.6)	0.0 (0.0)	0.0 (0.0)	0.0 (0.0)	0.0 (0.0)	3.2 (1.3)	16.5 (6.5)	27.6 (10.9)	138.7 (54.6)
Average precipitation days (≥ 1.0 mm)	6.6	6.1	7.7	7.9	10.1	12.6	12.5	12.3	8.6	6.9	7.7	7.6	106.6
Average relative humidity (%) (at 14:00)	59.2	52.0	44.1	41.7	42.9	46.4	47.1	49.2	50.8	53.0	59.4	65.1	50.9
Mean monthly sunshine hours	81.9	101.5	128.5	143.8	167.4	159.0	184.1	176.0	146.8	125.9	84.7	66.0	1,565.6
Percentage possible sunshine	54.1	58.0	57.0	52.6	51.1	47.4	54.9	57.5	62.4	62.2	52.2	48.9	54.9
Source: Central Institute for Meteorology and Geodynamics

== Economy ==
Umhausen was once a centre for cultivation of flax.

Today the main source of income is tourism. In the area of the community lies the tallest waterfall of Tyrol at 150 metres of height. The economy in Umhausen is a bit smaller than the economy in Längenfeld. It is supported by local craft enterprises. Moreover, the Vivea Gesundheitshotel Umhausen opened in 2011, which plays a large role in the local economy.

== Landslide ==
The Köfels landslide was a gigantic landslide, known as a sturzstrom, that occurred in the Ötz valley 9800±100 years ago according to radiocarbon dating of trees buried by the event. It involved a 2.5 km horizontal displacement and 800 m vertical displacement of 3.2 km^{3} of rock and mud along the Ötz valley floor, making it the third largest known sturzstrom.

== Population ==
Historical population
Year	Pop.	±%
1869	1,341	—
1880	1,366	+1.9%
1890	1,186	−13.2%
1900	1,175	−0.9%
1910	1,318	+12.2%
1923	1,368	+3.8%
1934	1,485	+8.6%
1939	1,528	+2.9%
1951	1,724	+12.8%
1961	1,834	+6.4%
1971	2,050	+11.8%
1981	2,298	+12.1%
1991	2,506	+9.1%
2001	2,830	+12.9%
2011	3,078	+8.8%

== Hedwig von Trapp / The Sound of Music ==
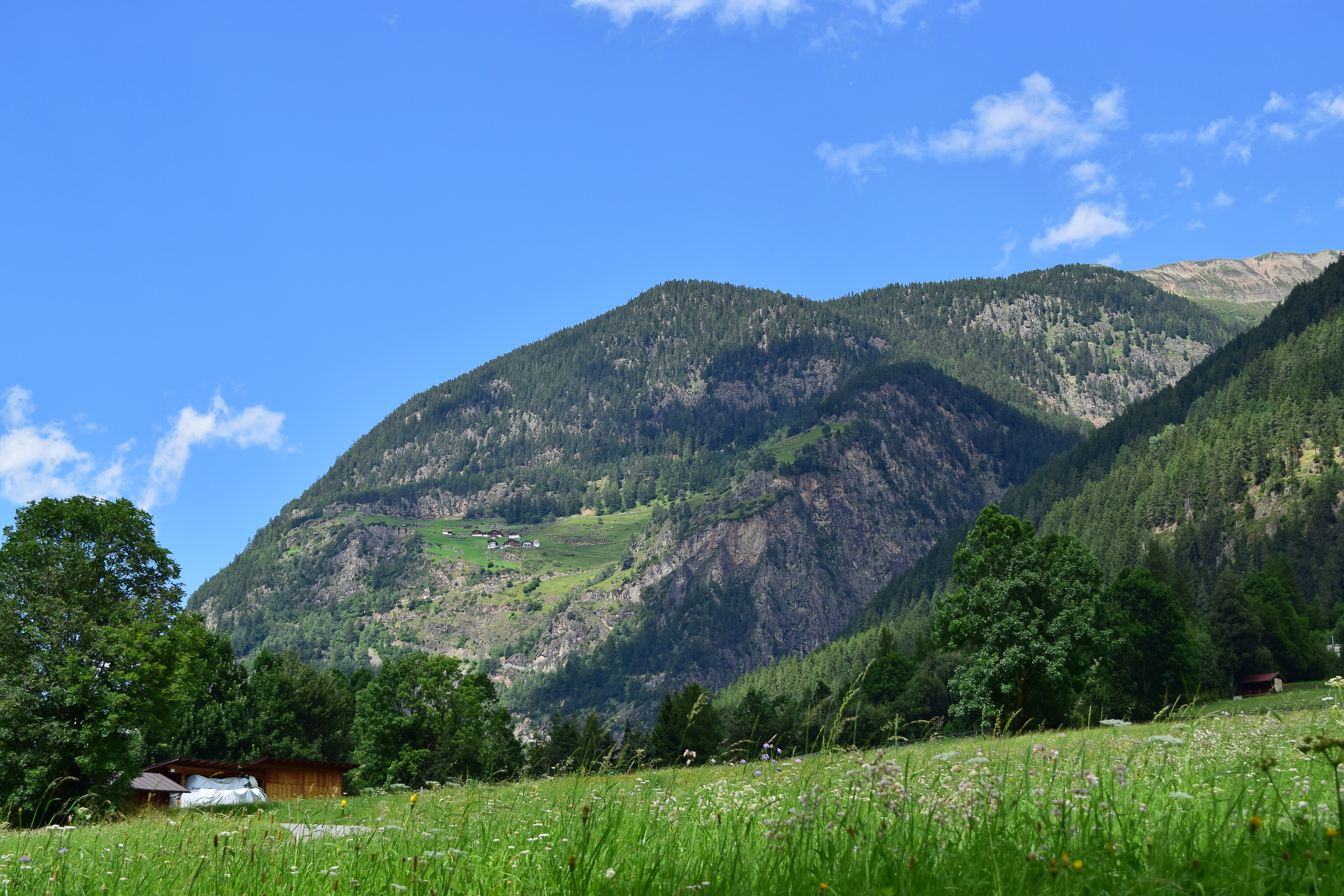
Farst. Hedwig von Trapp worked here as a teacher in the 1960s.

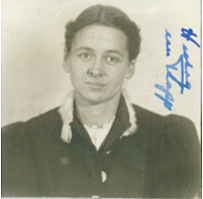
Hedwig von Trapp

Hedwig von Trapp, a member of the singing von Trapp family, lived and worked as a music teacher in Farst, above Umhausen. She moved there in the 1960s to treat her asthma. The school building is still present.
